= 2014–15 Danish 1st Division =

70th season of Danish 1st Division

Danish 1st Division
- Season: 2014–15

The 2014–15 Danish 1st Division season marked the 19th season of the league operating as the second tier of Danish football and the 75th season overall under the 1st Division name. The league is governed by the Danish Football Association (DBU).

The division-champion and runners-up are promoted to the 2015–16 Danish Superliga. The teams in the 11th and 12th places are relegated to the 2015–16 Danish 2nd Divisions.

== Participants ==
AGF and Viborg FF finished the 2013–14 season of the Superliga in 11th and 12th place, respectively, and were relegated to the 1st Division. They replaced Silkeborg IF and Hobro IK, who were promoted to the 2014–15 Danish Superliga.

Skive IK and FC Roskilde won promotion from the 2013–14 Danish 2nd Divisions. They replaced BK Marienlyst and Hvidovre IF.

=== Stadia and locations ===
Locations of the 2014–15 Danish 1st Division teams

Club	Finishing position last season	First season of current spell in 1st Division
AB Gladsaxe	10th	2004–05
AC Horsens	5th	2013–14
AGF	11th in Superliga	2014–15
Brønshøj BK	4th	2010–11
FC Fredericia	8th	2001–02
FC Roskilde	1st in 2nd Division East	2014–15
HB Køge	6th	2012–13
Lyngby BK	3rd	2012–13
Skive IK	1st in 2nd Division West	2014–15
Vendsyssel FF	9th	2010–11
Vejle BK	7th	2009–10
Viborg FF	12th in Superliga	2014–15

=== Personnel and sponsoring ===
Note: Flags indicate national team as has been defined under FIFA eligibility rules. Players and Managers may hold more than one non-FIFA nationality.

Team	Head coach	Captain	Kit manufacturer	Shirt sponsor
AB Gladsaxe	(Denmark) Thomas Nørgaard	(Denmark) Simon Bræmer	Hummel	PGO Scooters
AC Horsens	(Denmark) Bo Henriksen	(Denmark) Janus Drachmann	Hummel	Telia Stofa
AGF	(Denmark) Morten Wieghorst	(Denmark) Steffen Rasmussen	Hummel	YouSee
Brønshøj BK	(Denmark) Thomas Ibsen (caretaker)	(Denmark) Jesper Fleckner	Hummel	Sportigan
FC Fredericia	(Denmark) Peter Sørensen	(Denmark) Søren Pallesen	Hummel	Monjasa
FC Roskilde	(Denmark) Anders Theil	(Denmark) Nikolaj Hansen	Nike	CP ApS
HB Køge	(Denmark) Henrik Pedersen	(Denmark) Casper Grønn	Puma	SEAS-NVE
Lyngby BK	(Denmark) Søren Hermansen (caretaker)	(Denmark) Mathias Tauber	Adidas	J. Jensen A/S
Skive IK	(Denmark) Jakob Michelsen	(Denmark) Jakob Andersen	Hummel	Spar Nord
Vendsyssel FF	(Denmark) Ove Christensen	(Denmark) Buster Munk	Puma	Spar Nord
Vejle BK	(Sweden) Klebér Saarenpää	(Denmark) Henrik Bødker	Hummel	Frøs Herreds Sparekasse
Viborg FF	(Lithuania) Aurelijus Skarbalius	(Denmark) Mikkel Rask	Nike	Andelskassen

=== Managerial changes ===
Team	Outgoing manager	Manner of departure	Date of vacancy	Replaced by	Date of appointment	Position in table
AGF	(Denmark) Jesper Fredberg	Sacked	30 May 2014	(Denmark) Morten Wieghorst	1 June 2014	Pre-Season
AC Horsens	(Denmark) Johnny Mølby	End of contract	30 June 2014	(Denmark) Bo Henriksen	1 July 2014	Pre-Season
Brønshøj	(Denmark) Bo Henriksen	End of contract	30 June 2014	(Denmark) Carit Falch	1 July 2014	Pre-Season
HB Køge	(Denmark) Per Frandsen	Signed as youth manager by Brøndby IF	30 June 2014	(Denmark) Henrik Pedersen	1 July 2014	Pre-Season
Vendsyssel FF	(Denmark) Søren Kusk	End of contract	30 June 2014	(Denmark) Ove Christensen	1 July 2014	Pre-Season
Vejle BK	(Denmark) Tonny Hermansen	Mutual consent	20 October 2014	(Sweden) Klebér Saarenpää	20 October 2014	11th
Brønshøj	(Denmark) Carit Falch	Mutual consent	8 April 2015	(Denmark) Thomas Ibsen (caretaker)	8 April 2015	12th
FC Fredericia	(Denmark) Nicolai Wael	Sacked	13 April 2015	(Denmark) Peter Sørensen	13 April 2015	11th
Lyngby BK	(Denmark) Jack Majgaard	Sacked	4 May 2015	(Denmark) Søren Hermansen (caretaker)	4 May 2015	4th

== League table ==
Pos	Team	Pld	W	D	L	GF	GA	GD	Pts	Promotion or Relegation
1	Viborg FF (P)	33	17	14	2	47	20	+27	65	Promotion to Danish Superliga
2	AGF (P)	33	17	10	6	59	33	+26	61	Promotion to Danish Superliga
3	Lyngby Boldklub	33	14	9	10	49	37	+12	51	
4	Vendsyssel FF	33	13	10	10	35	29	+6	49	
5	Vejle BK	33	11	12	10	41	46	−5	45	
6	AC Horsens	33	10	12	11	43	42	+1	42	
7	HB Køge	33	10	12	11	33	35	−2	42	
8	Skive IK	33	8	17	8	40	42	−2	41	
9	FC Roskilde	33	10	8	15	40	38	+2	38	
10	FC Fredericia	33	6	16	11	28	40	−12	34	
11	AB Gladsaxe (R)	33	8	8	17	35	61	−26	32	Relegation to Danish 2nd Divisions
12	Brønshøj Boldklub (R)	33	3	14	16	20	47	−27	23	Relegation to Danish 2nd Divisions

Source: DBU
Rules for classification: 1) points; 2) goal difference; 3) number of goals scored
(P) Promoted; (R) Relegated

== Top scorers ==
Rank	Player	Club	Goals
1	(Georgia (country)) Mate Vatsadze	AGF	20
2	(Denmark) Kim Aabech	AGF	17
3	(Ivory Coast) Serge Déblé	Viborg FF	14
4	(Denmark) David Boysen	Lyngby Boldklub	12
5	(Brazil) Bruninho	HB Køge	11
5	(Iceland) Kjartan Finnbogason	AC Horsens	11
5	(Denmark) Andreas Albers	Vejle Boldklub	11

Updated to matches played on 6. June

== See also ==
- 2014–15 in Danish football
