= 2015–16 Danish 1st Division =

71st season of Danish 1st Division

Danish 1st Division
- Season: 2015–16
- Champions: Lyngby
- Promoted: Lyngby; Silkeborg; Horsens
- Relegated: Vestsjælland
- Top goalscorer: Kjartan Finnbogason - 10 goals
- Biggest home win: Silkeborg 5-0 Vejle (28 May 2016)

The 2015–16 Danish 1st Division season (known as the bet25 Liga for sponsorship purposes) marked the 20th season of the league operating as the second tier of Danish football and the 76th season overall under the 1st Division name. The league is governed by the Danish Football Association (DBU).

The division-champion, the runners-up and the third placed team are promoted to the 2016–17 Danish Superliga because the Danish Superliga will be expanded to 14 teams from the beginning of the 2016–17 season. The team in the 12th place is relegated to the 2016–17 Danish 2nd Divisions.

== Participants ==
FC Vestsjælland and Silkeborg IF finished the 2014–15 season of the Superliga in 11th and 12th place, respectively, and were relegated to the 1st Division. They replaced Viborg FF and AGF, who were promoted to the 2015–16 Danish Superliga.

FC Helsingør and Næstved BK won promotion from the 2014–15 Danish 2nd Divisions. They replaced Akademisk Boldklub and Brønshøj Boldklub.

=== Stadia and locations ===
Locations of the 2015–16 Danish 1st Division teams

Club	Location	Stadium	Turf	Capacity	2014–15 position
AC Horsens	Horsens	CASA Arena Horsens	Natural	10,400	6th
FC Fredericia	Fredericia	Monjasa Park	Natural	4,000	10th
FC Helsingør	Helsingør	Helsingør Stadion	Natural	4,500	2D East, 1st
FC Roskilde	Roskilde	Roskilde Idrætspark	Natural	6,000	9th
FC Vestsjælland	Slagelse	Harboe Arena Slagelse	Natural	10,000	Superliga, 11th
HB Køge	Herfølge/Køge	SEAS-NVE Park (until 10 May 2016); Castus Park (since 11 May 2016)	Natural	8,000	7th
Lyngby BK	Lyngby	Lyngby Stadion	Natural	8,000	3rd
Næstved BK	Næstved	Næstved Stadion	Natural	10,000	2D West, 1st
Silkeborg IF	Silkeborg	MASCOT Park	Natural	10,000	Superliga, 12th
Skive IK	Skive	Spar Nord Arena	Natural	10,000	8th
Vejle BK	Vejle	Vejle Stadion	Natural	10,418	5th
Vendsyssel FF	Hjørring	Bredbånd Nord Arena	Natural	7,500	4th

=== Personnel and sponsoring ===
Note: Flags indicate national team as has been defined under FIFA eligibility rules. Players and Managers may hold more than one non-FIFA nationality.

Team	Head coach	Captain	Kit manufacturer	Shirt sponsor
AC Horsens	(Denmark) Bo Henriksen	(Denmark) Janus Drachmann	Hummel	Telia Stofa
FC Fredericia	(Denmark) Jesper Sørensen	(Denmark) Christian Ege Nielsen	Hummel	Monjasa
FC Helsingør	(Denmark) Christian Lønstrup	(Denmark) Kasper Enghardt	Mitre	Spar Nord
FC Roskilde	(Denmark) Anders Theil	(Denmark) Nikolaj Hansen	Nike	CP ApS
FC Vestsjælland	(Denmark) Michael Hemmingsen	(Denmark) Henrik Madsen	Legea	Harboes Bryggeri
HB Køge	(Denmark) Henrik Lehm	(Denmark) Rasmus Nielsen	Puma	SEAS-NVE
Lyngby BK	(Denmark) David Nielsen	(Denmark) Mathias Tauber	Adidas	J. Jensen A/S
Næstved BK	(Denmark) Mogens Krogh	(Denmark) Daniel Segev Jørgensen	Mitre	Sydbank
Silkeborg IF	(Denmark) Peter Sørensen	(Denmark) Frank Hansen	uhlsport	Mascot International
Skive IK	(Sweden) Joakim Mattsson	(Denmark) Jakob Andersen	Hummel	Spar Nord
Vejle BK	(Denmark) Steen Thychosen (caretaker)	(Denmark) Niels Bisp Rasmussen	Hummel	Frøs Herreds Sparekasse
Vendsyssel FF	(Denmark) Jacob Krüger (caretaker) (Denmark) Ole Søndergaard (caretaker)	(Denmark) Buster Munk	Puma	Spar Nord

=== Managerial changes ===
Team	Outgoing manager	Manner of departure	Date of vacancy	Replaced by	Date of appointment	Position in table
Lyngby BK	(Denmark) Søren Hermansen	End of tenure as caretaker	30 June 2015	(Denmark) David Nielsen	1 July 2015	Pre-Season
Skive IK	(Denmark) Jakob Michelsen	Signed by SønderjyskE	30 June 2015	(Sweden) Joakim Mattsson	1 July 2015	Pre-Season
FC Fredericia	(Denmark) Peter Sørensen	End of contract	30 June 2015	(Denmark) Ove Pedersen	1 July 2015	Pre-Season
FC Vestsjælland	(Denmark) Michael Hansen	Sacked	1 September 2015	(Denmark) Michael Hemmingsen	3 September 2015	11th
Silkeborg IF	(Denmark) Kim Poulsen	Mutual consent	30 September 2015	(Denmark) Peter Sørensen	30 September 2015	8th
FC Fredericia	(Denmark) Ove Pedersen	Signed by Hobro IK	24 November 2015	(Denmark) Jesper Sørensen	10 December 2015	5th
HB Køge	(Denmark) Henrik Pedersen	Mutual consent	23 December 2015	(Denmark) Henrik Lehm	1 January 2016	7th
Vendsyssel FF	(Denmark) Ove Christensen	Mutual consent	23 April 2016	(Denmark) Jacob Krüger & Ole Søndergaard (caretakers)	23 April 2016	6th
Vejle BK	(Sweden) Klebér Saarenpää	Sacked	24 April 2016	(Denmark) Steen Thychosen (caretaker)	4 April 2016	4th

== League table ==
Pos	Team	Pld	W	D	L	GF	GA	GD	Pts	Promotion or Relegation
1	Lyngby Boldklub (P)	33	19	7	7	59	37	+22	64	Promotion to Danish Superliga
2	Silkeborg IF (P)	33	18	9	6	59	29	+30	63	Promotion to Danish Superliga
3	AC Horsens (P)	33	18	6	9	52	34	+18	60	Promotion to Danish Superliga
4	Vendsyssel FF	33	16	8	9	41	33	+8	56	
5	Vejle BK	33	16	5	12	56	46	+10	53	
6	FC Fredericia	33	12	11	10	45	45	0	47	
7	FC Helsingør	33	14	5	14	40	42	−2	47	
8	HB Køge	33	13	6	14	34	35	−1	45	
9	FC Roskilde	33	10	9	14	51	58	−7	39	
10	Næstved BK	33	10	4	19	37	48	−11	34	
11	Skive IK	33	8	7	18	37	50	−13	31	
12	FC Vestsjælland (Note: FC Vestsjælland was deducted six point for financial irregularities. On 9 December 2015 the club went bankrupt and withdrew from the league, which meant that the remaining games of the club would be made 3-0-victories for the opponent. The professional superstructure was dissolved, but the amateur section of the mother club continued playing in the lower regional levels, Zealand Series, as Slagelse B&I.) (D, R)	33	2	7	24	19	73	−54	7	Bankrupt; relegation to Zealand Series

Source: DBU
Rules for classification: 1) points; 2) goal difference; 3) number of goals scored
(D) Disqualified; (P) Promoted; (R) Relegated

== Top scorers ==
As of match played 7 December 2015

Rank	Player	Club	Goals
1	(Denmark) David Boysen	Lyngby BK	11
2	(Iceland) Kjartan Finnbogason	AC Horsens	10
3	(Australia) Brent McGrath	FC Fredericia	9
4	(North Macedonia) Bajram Fetai	FC Roskilde	8
5	(Denmark) Thomas Mikkelsen	Vejle BK	7
5	(Denmark) Jeppe Kjær	Lyngby BK	7
6	(Denmark) André Riel	FC Helsingør	6
6	(Faroe Islands) Jóan Símun Edmundsson	Vejle BK	6
6	(Denmark) Nikolaj Hansen	FC Vestsjælland	6
6	(Denmark) Mikael Uhre	Skive IK	6
6	(Denmark) Nicholas Gotfredsen	FC Fredericia	6

== See also ==
- 2015–16 in Danish football
