= 2013–14 Danish 1st Division =

69th season of Danish 1st Division

Danish 1st Division
- Season: 2013–14
- Champions: Silkeborg IF
- Promoted: Silkeborg IF; Hobro IK
- Relegated: Hvidovre IF; BK Marienlyst
- Matches: 198
- Goals: 573 (2.89 per match)
- Top goalscorer: Patrick Mortensen (23 goals)
- Biggest home win: Hobro IK 5-0 Silkeborg IF
- Biggest away win: Vendsyssel 0-4 Fredericia
- Highest scoring: Fredericia 2-5 Horsens
- Highest attendance: Silkeborg IF-Lyngby BK; 4.554 spectators
- Lowest attendance: BK Marienlyst-AB Gladsaxe; 217 spectators
- Average attendance: 2692

The 2013–14 Danish 1st Division season (known as the NordicBet Liga due to sponsorship by NordicBet) marked the 18th season of the league operating as the second tier of Danish football and the 74th season overall under the 1st Division name. The league is governed by the Danish Football Association (DBU).

The division-champion and runners-up are promoted to the 2014–15 Danish Superliga. The teams in the 11th and 12th places are relegated to the 2014–15 Danish 2nd Divisions.

== Participants ==
AC Horsens and Silkeborg IF finished the 2012–13 season of the Superliga in 11th and 12th place, respectively, and were relegated to the 1st Division. They replaced Viborg FF and FC Vestsjælland, who were promoted to the 2013–14 Danish Superliga.

Hvidovre IF and BK Marienlyst won promotion from the 2012–13 Danish 2nd Divisions. They replaced Skive IK and FC Fyn.

As of 1 July 2013 FC Hjørring will participate under the name Vendsyssel FF.

=== Stadia and locations ===
Locations of the 2013–14 Danish 1st Division teams

Club	Finishing position last season	First season of current spell in 1st Division
AB Gladsaxe	10th	2004–05
AC Horsens	11th in Superliga	2013–14
BK Marienlyst	1st in 2nd Division West	2013–14
Brønshøj BK	8th	2010–11
FC Fredericia	5th	2001–02
HB Køge	6th	2012–13
Hobro IK	9th	2010–11
Hvidovre IF	1st in 2nd Division East	2013–14
Lyngby BK	4th	2012–13
Silkeborg IF	12th in Superliga	2013–14
Vendsyssel FF	7th	2010–11
Vejle BK	3rd	2009–10

=== Personnel and sponsoring ===
Note: Flags indicate national team as has been defined under FIFA eligibility rules. Players and Managers may hold more than one non-FIFA nationality.

Team	Head coach	Captain	Kit manufacturer	Shirt sponsor
AB Gladsaxe	(Denmark) Thomas Nørgaard	(Denmark) Klaus Lykke	Hummel	PGO Scooters
AC Horsens	(Denmark) Johnny Mølby	(Denmark) Martin Retov	Hummel	Telia Stofa
BK Marienlyst	(Denmark) Anders Nielsen	(Denmark) Raafat El-Soussi	Nike	Albani Brewery
Brønshøj BK	(Denmark) Bo Henriksen	(Denmark) Pierre Kanstrup	Hummel	Sportigan
FC Fredericia	(Denmark) Nicolai Wael	(Denmark) Søren Pallesen	Hummel	Monjasa
HB Køge	(Denmark) Per Frandsen	(Denmark) Morten Karlsen	Puma	SEAS-NVE
Hobro IK	(Denmark) Jonas Dal	(Denmark) Rasmus Ingemann	Mitre	Spar Nord
Hvidovre IF	(Denmark) Per Nielsen	(Denmark) Thomas Wiil-Andersen	Nike	Lasse Jensen Entreprise
Lyngby BK	(Denmark) Jack Majgaard	(Denmark) Mathias Tauber	Adidas	J. Jensen A/S
Silkeborg IF	(Denmark) Jesper Sørensen	(Denmark) Frank Hansen	Uhlsport	Mascot International
Vendsyssel FF	(Denmark) Søren Kusk	(Denmark) Buster Munk	Puma	Spar Nord
Vejle BK	(Denmark) Tonny Hermansen	(Denmark) Jens Berthel Askou	Hummel	Frøs Herreds Sparekasse

=== Managerial changes ===
Team	Outgoing manager	Manner of departure	Date of vacancy	Replaced by	Date of appointment	Position in table
Lyngby Boldklub	(Denmark) Niels Frederiksen	Signed by Esbjerg fB	31 May 2013	(Denmark) Johan Lange	1 June 2013	Pre-Season
Akademisk Boldklub	(Denmark) Henrik Lehm	Resigned	4 June 2013	(Denmark) Thomas Nørgaard	4 June 2013	Pre-Season
Vejle BK	(Denmark) Kim Brink	Mutual consent	10 June 2013	(Denmark) Tonny Hermansen	17 June 2013	Pre-Season
FC Fredericia	(Denmark) Steen Thychosen (caretaker) (Denmark) Allan Simonsen (caretaker)	End of tenure as caretakers	30 June 2013	(Denmark) Nicolai Wael	1 July 2013	Pre-Season
Silkeborg IF	(Denmark) Viggo Jensen	End of contract	30 June 2013	(Denmark) Jesper Sørensen	1 July 2013	Pre-Season
Lyngby Boldklub	(Denmark) Johan Lange	Resigned	5 December 2013	(Denmark) Jack Majgaard	5 December 2013	5th

== League table ==
Pos	Team	Pld	W	D	L	GF	GA	GD	Pts	Promotion or relegation
1	Silkeborg IF (C, P)	33	20	6	7	67	38	+29	66	Promotion to Danish Superliga
2	Hobro (P)	33	20	5	8	58	36	+22	65	Promotion to Danish Superliga
3	Lyngby Boldklub	33	18	3	12	58	41	+17	57	
4	Brønshøj	33	16	5	12	47	39	+8	53	
5	Horsens	33	15	7	11	60	48	+12	52	
6	HB Køge	33	13	10	10	39	31	+8	49	
7	Vejle BK	33	12	11	10	49	38	+11	47	
8	Fredericia	33	12	7	14	47	45	+2	43	
9	Vendsyssel FF	33	12	2	19	35	59	−24	38	
10	AB Gladsaxe	33	9	9	15	42	57	−15	36	
11	Hvidovre IF (R)	33	10	6	17	43	63	−20	36	Relegation to Danish 2nd Divisions
12	Marienlyst (R)	33	4	3	26	28	78	−50	15	Relegation to Danish 2nd Divisions

Rules for classification: 1) points; 2) goal difference; 3) number of goals scored.
(C) Champions; (P) Promoted; (R) Relegated

== See also ==
- 2013–14 in Danish football
