= 2012–13 Danish 1st Division =

68th season of Danish 1st Division

Danish 1st Division
- Season: 2012–13
- Champions: Viborg
- Promoted: Viborg; Vestsjælland
- Relegated: Skive; Fyn
- Matches: 198
- Goals: 514 (2.6 per match)
- Top goalscorer: Thomas Dalgaard (27 goals)
- Biggest home win: Viborg 7–1 Vestsjælland
- Biggest away win: HB Køge 0–5 Lyngby
- Highest scoring: Viborg 7–1 Vestsjælland; Fyn 4–4 Hobro; Vestsjælland 5–3 Hobro
- Longest winning run: 5 games Vejle Kolding
- Longest unbeaten run: 19 games Viborg
- Longest winless run: 22 games Fyn
- Longest losing run: 19 games Fyn

The 2012–13 Danish 1st Division season (known as the Betsafe Liga due to sponsorship by Betsafe) marked the 17th season of the league operating as the second tier of Danish football and the 73rd season overall under the 1st Division name. This was the first season with a twelve-club First Division. The league is governed by the Danish Football Association (DBU).

The divisional champions and runners-up are promoted to the 2013–14 Danish Superliga. The teams in the 11th and 12th places are relegated to the 2013–14 Danish 2nd Divisions.

== Participants ==
Lyngby Boldklub and HB Køge finished the 2011–12 season of the Superliga in 11th and 12th place, respectively, and were relegated to the 1st Division. They replaced Esbjerg fB and Randers FC, who were promoted to the 2012–13 Danish Superliga.

FC Fyn won the promotion game from the 2011–12 Danish 2nd Divisions against HIK and were promoted to the division. It replaced FC Roskilde, Næstved Boldklub and Blokhus FC, who were relegated after the 2011–12 season as the number of teams in the division was reduced from 14 to 12. But FC Fyn went bankrupt on 1 February 2013. Immediately they were docked 3 points for going into administration and later they withdrew from the tournament during the winter break, and were treated as losing all of their Spring games 3-0.

On 28 September 2012, Akademisk Boldklub (AB) changed its name to Akademisk Boldklub Gladsaxe (AB Gladsaxe) after Gladsaxe Municipality became a sponsor and partner.

=== Stadia and locations ===
Locations of the Danish 1st Division 2011–12 teams

Club	Location	Stadium	Capacity	2011–12 position	First season of current spell
AB Gladsaxe	Gladsaxe	Gladsaxe Stadion	13,546	11th	2004–05
Brønshøj BK	Brønshøj	Tingbjerg Idrætspark	4,000	5th	2010–11
FC Fredericia	Fredericia	Monjasa Park	4,000	7th	2001–02
FC Fyn	Odense	Odense Atletikstadion	8,000	2D West, 1st	2012–13
FC Hjørring	Hjørring	Hjørring Stadion	7,500	10th	2010–11
FC Vestsjælland	Slagelse	Slagelse Stadion	10,000	6th	2009–10
HB Køge	Herfølge	SEAS-NVE Park	8,000	Superliga, 12th	2012–13
Hobro IK	Hobro	Hobro Stadion	4,000	9th	2010–11
Lyngby BK	Kongens Lyngby	Lyngby Stadion	8,000	Superliga, 11th	2012–13
Skive IK	Skive	Sparbank Arena (until 17 November 2012); Spar Nord Arena (since 18 November 2012)	10,000	8th	2007–08
Vejle Kolding	Vejle	Jokri Park	10,500	3rd	2009–10
Viborg FF	Viborg	Viborg Stadion	9,565	4th	2008–09

=== Personnel and sponsoring ===
Note: Flags indicate national team as has been defined under FIFA eligibility rules. Players and Managers may hold more than one non-FIFA nationality.

Team	Head coach	Captain	Shirt sponsor
AB Gladsaxe	(Denmark) Henrik Lehm	(Denmark) Klaus Lykke	PGO Scooters
Brønshøj BK	(Denmark) Bo Henriksen	(Denmark) Pierre Kanstrup	Sportigan
FC Fredericia	(Denmark) Steen Thychosen (caretaker) (Denmark) Allan Simonsen (caretaker)	(Denmark) Søren Pallesen	Monjasa
FC Fyn	(Denmark) Jesper Tollefsen	(Denmark) Rune Nautrup	Sparekassen Faaborg
FC Hjørring	(Denmark) Søren Kusk	(Denmark) Buster Munk	Spar Nord
FC Vestsjælland	(Denmark) Ove Pedersen	(Denmark) Kristoffer Wichmann	Harboes Bryggeri
HB Køge	(Denmark) Per Frandsen	(Denmark) Morten Karlsen	SEAS-NVE
Hobro IK	(Denmark) Jonas Dal	(Denmark) Rasmus Ingemann	Spar Nord
Lyngby BK	(Denmark) Niels Frederiksen	(Denmark) Mathias Tauber	J. Jensen A/S
Skive IK	(Denmark) Michael Hansen	(Denmark) Martin Thomsen	SPARBANK
Vejle Kolding	(Denmark) Kim Brink	(Denmark) Jens Berthel Askou	Frøs Herreds Sparekasse
Viborg FF	(Denmark) Ove Christensen	(Denmark) Mikkel Rask	Peter Larsen Kaffe

=== Managerial changes ===
Team	Outgoing manager	Manner of departure	Date of vacancy	Replaced by	Date of appointment	Position in table
Hobro IK	(Denmark) Jakob Michelsen	Signed by Tanzania U21	11 June 2012	(Denmark) Klavs Rasmussen	28 June 2012	Pre-Season
FC Hjørring	(Denmark) Henrik Lehm	Resigned	15 June 2012	(Denmark) Søren Kusk	27 June 2012	Pre-Season
AB Gladsaxe	(Denmark) Kasper Kurland	Sacked	13 August 2012	(Denmark) Henrik Lehm	14 August 2012	12th
HB Køge	(Denmark) Tommy Møller Nielsen	Sacked	3 September 2012	(Denmark) Per Frandsen	5 September 2012	12th
Vejle Kolding	(Denmark) Nicolai Wael	Sacked	8 January 2013	(Denmark) Kim Brink	8 January 2013	2nd
Hobro IK	(Denmark) Klavs Rasmussen	Resigned	17 January 2013	(Denmark) Jonas Dal	22 January 2013	10th
FC Fredericia	(Denmark) Thomas Thomasberg	Sacked	8 April 2013	(Denmark) Steen Thychosen (caretaker) (Denmark) Allan Simonsen (caretaker)	8 April 2013	6th

== League table ==
Pos	Team	Pld	W	D	L	GF	GA	GD	Pts	Promotion or relegation
1	Viborg FF (C, P)	33	17	11	5	60	30	+30	62	Promotion to Danish Superliga
2	Vestsjælland (P)	33	17	11	5	39	27	+12	62	Promotion to Danish Superliga
3	Vejle Kolding	33	16	10	7	46	29	+17	58	
4	Lyngby Boldklub	33	17	5	11	55	42	+13	56	
5	Fredericia	33	11	11	11	53	48	+5	44	
6	HB Køge	33	12	8	13	39	45	−6	44	
7	Hjørring (Note: On 5 May 2013 FC Hjørring was denied licence renewal because the club failed to meet the economic requirements. The Danish FA decided that the club would be relegated to second division at the end of the season. The decision was appealed by the club and since the club was able to raise the necessary money, the decision was reversed and the club was allowed to stay in the league.)	33	10	10	13	38	41	−3	40	
8	Brønshøj (Note: On 30 April Brønshøj was docked six point due to irregularities with player contracts.)	33	12	9	12	41	36	+5	39	
9	Hobro	33	9	11	13	37	43	−6	38	
10	AB Gladsaxe	33	8	13	12	33	34	−1	37	
11	Skive IK (R)	33	10	7	16	47	55	−8	37	Relegation to Danish 2nd Divisions
12	Fyn (Note: On 1 February 2013 FC Fyn went bankrupt. They were docked three points for going into administration and later the team dissolved itself and withdrew from the tournament. With that they lost their remaining matches 3-0. The licence was relegated to Funen Series and used by Boldklubben 1913 in the following season.) (D, R)	33	2	8	23	26	84	−58	11	Relegation to Funen Series

Source: Danish Football Association
Rules for classification: 1) points; 2) goal difference; 3) number of goals scored.
(C) Champions; (D) Disqualified; (P) Promoted; (R) Relegated

== See also ==
- 2012–13 in Danish football
