= Marcel Rømer =

Danish footballer (born 1991)

Personal information
- Full name: Marcel Ibsen Rømer
- Date of birth: 8 August 1991 (age 35)
- Place of birth: Køge, Denmark
- Height: 1.81 m (5 ft 11 in)
- Position: Midfielder

Team information
- Current team: HB Køge
- Number: 27

Youth career
- –2000: Køge
- 2000–2009: Herfølge

Senior career*
Years	Team	Apps	(Gls)
2009–2013	HB Køge	98	(4)
2013–2016	Viborg	58	(5)
2016–2019	SønderjyskE	101	(6)
2019–2025	Lyngby	138	(6)
2025	KA Akureyri	23	(0)
2026–	HB Køge	14	(0)

International career
2010	Denmark U19	5	(0)
2010	Denmark U20	3	(1)
- * Club domestic league appearances and goals as of 2 June 2026

Marcel Ibsen Rømer (Danish pronunciation: [ˈʁœːmɐ]; born 8 August 1991) is a Danish professional footballer who plays as a midfielder for Danish 1st Division club HB Køge.

== Career ==
=== HB Køge ===
Rømer started his youth career with Køge Boldklub before moving to the youth academy of Herfølge Boldklub at age 9. On 1 November 2009, Rømer made his professional debut for the merger club, HB Køge, as a late substitute for Lasse Kronborg in a 0–0 draw against SønderjyskE. He played four full seasons for the club, in which he made 105 total appearances, scoring four goals.

=== Viborg ===
In September 2013, on the last day of the transfer window, Rømer signed a three-year contract with Viborg FF. He made his debut on 15 September in a 1–0 away win over AGF.

In his three seasons with Viborg, Rømer made a total of 63 appearances, in which he scored five goals.

=== SønderjyskE ===
On 17 December 2015, it was announced that Rømer had signed for SønderjyskE in search of more playing time, as he had been mostly benched during the first six months of the season. The contract with SønderjyskE was valid until the summer of 2018. He made his debut for SønderjyskE in the Danish Superliga on 6 March 2016, when he came on as a substitute for Janus Drachmann in the 90th minute of a 3–1 win at home over Brøndby. On 30 April, he scored his first goal for the club in a 2–1 away victory over Hobro after an assist by Johan Absalonsen.

In the following season, Rømer made his European debut. On 14 July 2016, he was a starter in the 2–1 home win over Strømsgodset in the first round of the UEFA Europa League.

Rømer would make 117 total appearances during his spell at SønderjyskE, scoring 6 goals.

=== Lyngby ===
On 31 August 2019, Rømer joined Lyngby Boldklub on a four-year deal from SønderjyskE. He suffered relegation to the Danish 1st Division with the club on 9 May 2021 after a loss to last placed AC Horsens. He led the club back to promotion to the Superliga as team captain the following season.

=== KA Akureyri ===
On 14 April 2025 it was confirmed that Rømer moved to the Icelandic Besta deild karla club KA Akureyri.

=== HB Køge ===
On 4 November 2025 it was confirmed, that Rømer had signed a contract with his former club, HB Køge, effective from 1 January 2026.

== Personal life ==
His brother, André Rømer is also a professional footballer.

In recent years, Rømer has become more religious and wears a cross necklace. When he takes off the necklace before practice or a match, he kisses the cross and prays.

Rømer experienced a tragic loss when his wife Cecilie Dolberg Rømer unexpectedly died on 28 February 2022 due to a presumed heart condition.

== Career statistics ==
As of match played 26 November 2023

Appearances and goals by club, season and competition
Club	Season	League			Danish Cup		Europe		Other		Tota	
Club	Season	Division	Apps	Goals	Apps	Goals	Apps	Goals	Apps	Goals	Apps	Goals
HB Køge	2009–10	Superliga	18	1	1	0	—		—		19	1
HB Køge	2010–11	1st Division	20	0	1	0	—		—		21	0
HB Køge	2011–12	Superliga	31	2	4	0	—		—		35	2
HB Køge	2012–13	1st Division	23	1	0	0	—		—		23	1
HB Køge	2013–14	1st Division	6	0	1	0	—		—		7	0
HB Køge	Total		98	4	7	0	—		—		105	4
Viborg	2013–14	Superliga	20	2	1	0	—		—		21	2
Viborg	2014–15	1st Division	28	3	1	0	—		—		29	3
Viborg	2015–16	Superliga	10	0	3	0	—		—		13	0
Viborg	Total		58	5	5	0	—		—		63	5
SønderjyskE	2015–16	Superliga	12	1	1	0	—		—		13	1
SønderjyskE	2016–17	Superliga	33	2	2	0	6 (Note: Appearance(s) in the UEFA Europa League)	0	—		41	2
SønderjyskE	2017–18	Superliga	28	2	2	0	—		3 (Note: Appearances in the Superliga play-offs)	0	33	2
SønderjyskE	2018–19	Superliga	27	1	2	0	—		—		29	1
SønderjyskE	2019–20	Superliga	1	0	0	0	—		—		1	0
SønderjyskE	Total		101	6	7	0	6	0	3	0	117	6
Lyngby	2019–20	Superliga	21	2	1	0	—		0	0	22	2
Lyngby	2020–21	Superliga	26	0	3	1	—		—		29	1
Lyngby	2021–22	1st Division	19	2	2	0	—		—		21	2
Lyngby	2022–23	Superliga	31	1	1	0	—		—		32	1
Lyngby	2023–24	Superliga	16	1	2	0	—		—		18	1
Lyngby	Total		113	6	9	1	—		0	0	122	7
Career total			370	21	28	1	6	0	3	0	407	22

== Honours ==
Viborg

- 1st Division: 2014–15
