= Patrick Banggaard =

Danish footballer

Personal information
- Full name: Patrick Bangaard Jensen
- Date of birth: 4 April 1994 (age 32)
- Place of birth: Otterup, Denmark
- Height: 1.96 m (6 ft 5 in)
- Position: Centre-back

Youth career
- –2007: Otterup B&IK
- 2007–2009: Fjordager IF/B1909
- 2009–2012: Vejle

Senior career*
Years	Team	Apps	(Gls)
2012	VB Kolding	6	(1)
2013–2017	Midtjylland	95	(3)
2017–2019	Darmstadt 98	17	(1)
2018	→ Roda JC (loan)	14	(0)
2018–2019	→ Pafos (loan)	29	(0)
2019–2023	SønderjyskE	51	(2)
Total		212	(7)

International career
2010	Denmark U16	1	(1)
2010–2011	Denmark U17	11	(0)
2011–2012	Denmark U18	9	(0)
2012–2013	Denmark U19	14	(1)
2013–2017	Denmark U21	25	(2)
- * Club domestic league appearances and goals

Patrick Banggaard Jensen (born 4 April 1994) is a Danish retired professional footballer who played as a centre-back.

Noted for his tall frame and physical strength, Banggaard progressed through various youth teams on his native island Funen, before moving to the Vejle Boldklub academy in 2009, where he would make his professional debut a few years later. In 2013, he was signed by Midtjylland where he developed into a solid starter in the Danish Superliga, which prompted a move to German Bundesliga club Darmstadt 98. After suffering relegation with the team, and loan deals in the Netherlands and Cyprus, Banggaard returned to Denmark in 2019 to sign with SønderjyskE, where he won the Danish Cup in his first season.

He is a Danish youth international, having gained 25 caps for the national under-21 team.

== Career ==
=== Early career ===
Starting his youth career with Funen-based club Otterup B&IK before moving the Fjordager IF/B1909 academy – in Odense, the largest city on the island – as a 13-year old. At that point he was also a talented handball player. He later moved to the youth academy of Vejle Boldklub as a 15-year-old. On 5 May 2012, he made his professional debut for Vejle in a 1–0 defeat to Esbjerg fB in the second-tier Danish 1st Division. He came to a total of four league appearances. In early-May 2012 he completed a three-day trial practice session in Germany for Bundesliga club 1. FSV Mainz 05, however, a move did not materialise.

=== Midtjylland ===
He ended up signing with Midtjylland in January 2013. A month after his arrival, Bangaard was infected with mononucleosis and was out for four to six weeks. Bangaard quickly became a regular part of the squad. He played 31 league games in the 2013–14 season and was also rewarded with a new contract in August 2014.

With Midtjylland he won the Danish league title in 2014–15. His team was eliminated in the second qualifying round of the following edition of the UEFA Champions League. In the 2015–16 UEFA Europa League they then reached the round of 32. Bangaard made a total of 111 competitive appearances for Midtjylland before moving abroad.

=== Years abroad ===
On 31 January 2017, Banggaard signed a three-and-a-half-year contract with German Bundesliga club SV Darmstadt 98 for a fee of €600,000. On 18 March, he made his debut for the team in the 1–0 away defeat to VfL Wolfsburg. In the second half of the 2016–17 season, he was utilised in nine games. As part of the team, he suffered relegation as bottom of the league table. In the 2. Bundesliga, he played in nine games, scoring one goal.

Shortly before the end of the winter transfer period, he moved to the Dutch Eredivisie club Roda JC Kerkrade on loan until the end of the season. For the Limburg-based team he fought for a regular starting spot and was used in all 14 remaining games of the regular season, and was also used twice in the play-offs for promotion and relegation. With Roda, he experienced relegation from the Eredivisie; his second successive relegation with a team.

In early-August 2018 he was sent on another loan, this time to the Cypriot First Division side Pafos FC. There, Banggaard competed for a regular place and finished the regular season with 20 appearances in the regular season. In the subsequent relegation round, for which Pafos qualified as eighth in the league table, he played in nine games. At the end of the season, Pafos managed to stay up in the league.

=== SønderjyskE ===
Banggaard joined SønderjyskE on 7 June 2019, signing a four-year contract. There, he was reunited with his former head coach from Midtjylland, Glen Riddersholm. He made his debut for the club on 14 July in a 2–1 win over Randers. Banggaard won the 2019–20 Danish Cup with SønderjyskE by beating AaB in a 2–0 win. The win marked the first trophy in club history.

After prolonged injury problems, Banggaard confirmed in June 2023 that he had decided to end his career.

== Career statistics ==
=== Club ===
Appearances and goals by club, season and competition
Club	Season	League			National cup		League cup		Continental		Other		Total	
Club	Season	Division	Apps	Goals	Apps	Goals	Apps	Goals	Apps	Goals	Apps	Goals	Apps	Goals
VB Kolding	2011–12	1st Division	6	1	0	0	–		–		–		6	1
Midtjylland	2012–13	Superligaen	5	0	0	0	–		–		–		5	0
Midtjylland	2013–14	Superligaen	31	0	1	0	–		–		–		32	0
Midtjylland	2014–15	Superligaen	26	0	0	0	–		2	0	–		28	1
Midtjylland	2015–16	Superligaen	13	1	2	0	–		2	0	–		17	1
Midtjylland	2016–17	Superligaen	20	1	1	0	–		8	0	–		29	1
Midtjylland	Total		95	3	4	0	0	0	12	0	0	0	111	3
Darmstadt 98	2016–17	Bundesliga	9	0	–		–		–		–		9	0
Darmstadt 98	2017–18	2. Bundesliga	8	1	1	0	–		–		–		9	1
Darmstadt 98	Total		17	1	1	0	0	0	0	0	0	0	18	1
Roda JC (loan)	2017–18	Eredivisie	14	0	–		–		–		2 (Note: Appearances in Eredivisie play-offs)	0	16	0
Pafos (loan)	2018–19	Cypriot First Division	29	0	5	0	–		–		–		34	0
SønderjyskE	2019–20	Superligaen	24	1	4	0	–		–		–		28	1
SønderjyskE	2020–21	Superligaen	27	1	6	0	–		1	0	–		34	0
SønderjyskE	Total		51	2	10	0	–		1	0	0	0	62	2
Career total			212	7	20	0	0	0	13	0	2	0	247	7

== Honours ==
Midtjylland

- Danish Superliga: 2014–15

SønderjyskE

- Danish Cup: 2019–20
