= Martin Mikkelsen =

Danish footballer (born 1986)

Personal information
- Date of birth: 29 April 1986 (age 40)
- Place of birth: Vejlby, Denmark
- Height: 1.82 m (6 ft 0 in)
- Position: Midfielder

Team information
- Current team: Aarhus Fremad (U-23 manager)

Youth career
- Skovbakken
- 1992–1996: Vejlby IK
- 1997–2004: AGF

Senior career*
Years	Team	Apps	(Gls)
2004–2008	AGF	2	(0)
2008–2014	Fredericia	155	(16)
2014–2019	Hobro	143	(4)
2019–2020	Fredericia	21	(0)
2020–2021	Aarhus Fremad	15	(0)
Total		336	(20)

International career
2001	Denmark U16	3	(0)
2002	Denmark U17	2	(0)

Managerial career
- 2020–2023: Aarhus Fremad (assistant)
- 2022–2023: Aarhus Fremad (reserves manager)
- 2023–2025: Odder IGF (assistant)
- 2025: Odder IGF
- 2026–: Aarhus Fremad (U-23 manager)
- * Club domestic league appearances and goals

Martin Bentzen Veng Mikkelsen (born 29 April 1986) is a Danish football coach and former professional footballer who played as a midfielder. He is currently the manager of Aarhus Fremad's U-23 team.

== Playing career ==
Mikkelsen made his professional debut as part of AGF on 25 July 2004 in a 2–2 away draw against FC Nordsjælland, coming on as an 81st-minute substitute for Jeffrey Aubynn. He would later play for FC Fredericia and Hobro IK.

== Coaching career ==
On 11 August 2019, Mikkelsen returned to FC Fredericia. Two weeks later, he was also hired as a youth consultant at Danish 2nd Division club VSK Aarhus.

He left Fredericia in June 2020, and signed with Aarhus Fremad in the Danish 2nd Division, where he would become a player-assistant to head coach Morten Dahm Kjærgaard. He retired as a player in July 2021 to focus full-time on his role as assistant coach of Aarhus Fremad. On 14 June 2022 Mikkelsen confirmed, that he accepted an offer to become the manager of Aarhus Fremad's reserve team, which was playing in the Denmark Series. However, he would still serve as assistant coach for the first team alongside the new position.

In July 2023, Mikkelsen joined Odder IGF as assistant coach to Jacob Eichner. In July 2025, Mikkelsen extended his contract with Odder until June 2027 and would, along with Eichner, form a head coach duo. One month later, in August 2025, Eichner left the club for VSK Aarhus, and Mikkelsen consequently took over the head coach role at Odder on his own.

In January 2026, Mikkelsen was appointed manager of Aarhus Fremad's U-23 team.

== Career statistics ==
As of match played on 1 April 2018

Appearances and goals by club, season and competition
Club	Season	League			Cup		League Cup		Other		Total	
Club	Season	Division	Apps	Goals	Apps	Goals	Apps	Goals	Apps	Goals	Apps	Goals
Fredericia	2008–09	Danish 1st Division	?	5	0	0	—				?	5
Fredericia	2009–10	Danish 1st Division	?	4	0	0	—				?	4
Fredericia	2010–11	Danish 1st Division	?	1	1	0	—				1	1
Fredericia	2011–12	Danish 1st Division	?	2	2	0	—				2	2
Fredericia	2012–13	Danish 1st Division	26	1	0	0	—				26	1
Fredericia	2013–14	Danish 1st Division	25	0	1	0	—				26	0
Fredericia	Total		51	13	4	0	0	0	0	0	55	13
Hobro	2014–15	Danish Superliga	29	2	0	0	—				29	2
Hobro	2015–16	Danish Superliga	27	1	0	0	—				27	1
Hobro	2016–17	Danish 1st Division	29	0	0	0	—				29	0
Hobro	2017–18	Danish Superliga	24	1	1	0	—				25	1
Hobro	Total		109	4	1	0	0	0	0	0	110	4
Career totals			160	17	5	0	0	0	0	0	165	17
