= 2014–15 Danish Superliga =

25th season of Danish Superliga

Danish Superliga
- Season: 2014–15
- Champions: Midtjylland
- Relegated: Vestsjælland; Silkeborg
- Champions League: Midtjylland
- Europa League: Copenhagen; Brøndby; Randers
- Matches: 198
- Goals: 478 (2.41 per match)
- Top goalscorer: Martin Pušić; Mads Hvilsom (15 goals both)
- Biggest home win: Brøndby 5–0 Vestsjælland; AaB 5–0 Hobro
- Biggest away win: Hobro 1–5 Midtjylland; Silkeborg 0–4 Copenhagen
- Highest scoring: Midtjylland 5–2 Randers; Esbjerg 5–2 Silkeborg
- Longest winning run: 5 matches Midtjylland
- Longest unbeaten run: 10 matches Copenhagen
- Longest winless run: 18 matches Silkeborg
- Longest losing run: 8 matches Silkeborg

The 2014–15 Danish Superliga season was the 25th season of the Danish Superliga, which decides the Danish football championship.

Since Denmark dropped from fifteenth to nineteenth place in the 2014 UEFA association coefficient rankings at the end of the 2013–14 season, only the champion of the league qualified for the UEFA Champions League; that club would commence its campaign in the second qualifying round. Furthermore, the second and third-place clubs would now enter the UEFA Europa League in the first qualifying round.

== Teams ==
AGF and Viborg FF finished the 2013–14 season in 11th and 12th place, respectively, and were relegated to the 2014–15 1st Division.

The relegated teams were replaced by 2013–14 1st Division champions Silkeborg IF and the runners-up Hobro IK.

On 17 July 2014, the national stadium and home to FC København changed its official name to Telia Parken due to a sponsorship agreement with Telia.

=== Stadia and locations ===
Locations of the Danish Superliga 2014–15 teams

Club	Location	Stadium	Turf	Capacity	2013–14 position
AaB	Aalborg	Nordjyske Arena	Natural	13,797	1st
Brøndby IF	Brøndby	Brøndby Stadium	Natural	29,000	4th
Esbjerg fB	Esbjerg	Blue Water Arena	Natural	18,000	5th
FC Copenhagen	Copenhagen	Telia Parken	Natural	38,065	2nd
FC Midtjylland	Herning	MCH Arena	Natural	11,800	3rd
FC Nordsjælland	Farum	Farum Park	Artificial	9,900	6th
FC Vestsjælland	Slagelse	Harboe Arena Slagelse	Natural	10,000	9th
Hobro IK	Hobro	DS Arena	Natural	9,000	1D, 2nd
OB	Odense	TRE-FOR Park	Natural	15,633	8th
Randers FC	Randers	AutoC Park Randers	Natural	12,000	7th
Silkeborg IF	Silkeborg	Mascot Park	Natural	9,565	1D, 1st
SønderjyskE	Haderslev	Sydbank Park	Natural	10,000	10th

=== Personnel and sponsoring ===
Note: Flags indicate national team as has been defined under FIFA eligibility rules. Players and Managers may hold more than one non-FIFA nationality.

Team	Head coach	Captain	Kit manufacturer	Shirt sponsor
AaB	(Denmark) Kent Nielsen	(Denmark) Thomas Augustinussen	adidas	Spar Nord
Brøndby IF	(Denmark) Thomas Frank	(Denmark) Mikkel Thygesen (-2015), Thomas Kahlenberg (2015-)	hummel	Bet25.dk
Esbjerg fB	(Denmark) Niels Frederiksen	(Denmark) Hans Henrik Andreasen	Nike	Sydenergi
F.C. Copenhagen	(Norway) Ståle Solbakken	(Denmark) Thomas Delaney	adidas	Carlsberg
FC Midtjylland	(Denmark) Glen Riddersholm	(Denmark) Kristian Bak Nielsen	Wunderelf	Nordea
FC Nordsjælland	(Iceland) Ólafur Kristjánsson	(Denmark) Patrick Mtiliga	Diadora	City Container (-2014), DHL (2015-)
FC Vestsjælland	(Denmark) Michael Hansen	(Denmark) Henrik Madsen	Mitre	Harboes Bryggeri
Hobro IK	(Denmark) Jonas Dal	(Denmark) Rasmus Ingeman	Mitre	Spar Nord
OB	(Denmark) Ove Pedersen	(Iceland) Ari Freyr Skúlason	Puma	Carlsberg
Randers FC	(England) Colin Todd	(Denmark) Christian Keller	Warrior	Verdo
Silkeborg IF	(Denmark) Kim Poulsen	(Denmark) Frank Hansen	uhlsport	Mascot International
SønderjyskE	(Denmark) Lars Søndergaard	(Denmark) Niels Lodberg	Diadora	Frøs Herreds Sparekasse

=== Managerial changes ===
Team	Outgoing manager	Manner of departure	Date of vacancy	Replaced by	Date of appointment	Position in table
FC Nordsjælland	(Denmark) Kasper Hjulmand	End of contract and signed by FSV Mainz 05	30 June 2014	(Iceland) Ólafur Kristjánsson	1 July 2014	Pre-Season
FC Vestsjælland	(Denmark) Ove Pedersen	End of contract	30 June 2014	(Denmark) Michael Hansen	1 July 2014	Pre-Season
OB	(Denmark) Troels Bech	Sacked	30 September 2014	(Denmark) Ove Pedersen	30 September 2014	11th
Silkeborg IF	(Denmark) Jesper Sørensen	Sacked	8 December 2014	(Denmark) Kim Poulsen	8 December 2014	12th

== League table ==
Pos	Team	Pld	W	D	L	GF	GA	GD	Pts	Qualification or relegation
1	Midtjylland (C)	33	22	5	6	64	34	+30	71	Qualification for Champions League second qualifying round
2	Copenhagen	33	20	7	6	40	22	+18	67	Qualification for Europa League second qualifying round (Note: Copenhagen qualified for Europa League second qualifying round by winning the 2014–15 Danish Cup. Therefore the spots awarded to the runners-up and third-placed teams are passed down to the third-placed team and fourth-placed team respectively.)
3	Brøndby	33	16	7	10	43	29	+14	55	Qualification for Europa League first qualifying round
4	Randers	33	14	10	9	39	28	+11	52	Qualification for Europa League first qualifying round
5	AaB	33	13	9	11	39	31	+8	48	
6	Nordsjælland	33	13	5	15	39	44	−5	44	
7	Hobro	33	11	10	12	40	47	−7	43	
8	Esbjerg	33	10	10	13	47	45	+2	40	
9	OB	33	11	7	15	35	43	−8	40	
10	SønderjyskE	33	7	16	10	35	44	−9	37	
11	Vestsjælland (R)	33	9	6	18	31	52	−21	33	Relegation to Danish 1st Division
12	Silkeborg (R)	33	2	8	23	26	59	−33	14	Relegation to Danish 1st Division

Source: Danish Superliga
Rules for classification: 1) points; 2) goal difference; 3) number of goals scored
(C) Champions; (R) Relegated

== Results ==
=== Matchday 1–11 ===
Home \ Away	AaB	BIF	EfB	FCK	FCM	FCN	FCV	HIK	OB	RFC	SIF	SJE
AaB			1–1	1–0	2–0	1–2		1–1		0–0		
Brøndby	2–1						5–0		1–1	0–2	2–0	2–0
Esbjerg fB		2–2					3–0		2–0	0–1	0–0	1–1
Copenhagen		1–0	2–1		1–2	2–1		0–3		1–0		
Midtjylland		3–1	2–0				1–0		3–2	3–1	2–1	
Nordsjælland		0–3	3–2		2–1		3–2		2–1			2–3
Vestsjælland	1–0			2–2					3–1		2–0	1–1
Hobro		2–0	1–1		1–5	0–0	3–1					
OB	1–1			0–1				1–2			2–0	1–1
Randers FC						0–0	1–0	2–1	0–2		1–0	
Silkeborg	2–2			0–0		1–2		2–2				0–2
SønderjyskE	0–0			1–1	1–3			1–1		1–1		

Source: Danish Football Association (in Danish)
Legend: Blue = home team win; Yellow = draw; Red = away team win.

=== Matchday 12–33 ===
Home \ Away	AaB	BIF	EfB	FCK	FCM	FCN	FCV	HIK	OB	RFC	SIF	SJE
AaB		1–0	1–0	0–1	1–2	1–0	2–0	5–0	0–2	2–1	2–0	1–4
Brøndby	1–1		0–1	0–0	1–1	3–1	4–0	1–0	2–0	1–0	1–0	1–0
Esbjerg fB	1–3	0–0		0–1	3–3	0–0	2–1	4–2	0–2	0–0	5–2	2–3
Copenhagen	1–0	3–1	2–1		3–0	2–0	2–0	1–0	1–0	1–1	1–0	1–1
Midtjylland	2–0	2–3	3–0	2–0		2–0	2–1	3–0	3–0	5–2	1–0	2–1
Nordsjælland	1–0	2–0	1–3	0–0	1–0		2–0	4–2	1–2	0–3	1–0	4–0
Vestsjælland	2–1	0–1	1–4	0–1	0–0	2–1		1–1	1–2	0–1	3–1	0–1
Hobro	1–0	3–0	3–1	0–2	0–0	1–0	0–1		2–2	0–1	2–2	2–2
OB	1–1	0–2	0–2	1–0	3–1	1–0	1–2	3–1		0–2	1–1	0–0
Randers FC	1–1	1–1	3–2	3–0	1–2	2–0	1–1	0–1	3–0		1–2	0–0
Silkeborg	1–2	0–2	1–3	0–4	1–2	2–2	1–2	0–1	0–1	0–2		2–2
SønderjyskE	0–3	0–1	0–0	1–2	1–1	1–2	1–1	1–0	2–1	1–1	1–4	

Source: Danish Football Association (in Danish)
Legend: Blue = home team win; Yellow = draw; Red = away team win.

== Season statistics ==
=== Top goalscorers ===
Updated including all games played on 7 June 2015.

Rank	Player	Club	Goals
1	(Austria) Martin Pušić	Esbjerg fB/FC Midtjylland	17
2	(Denmark) Mads Dittmer Hvilsom	Hobro IK	16
3	(Denmark) Morten Nicolas Rasmussen	FC Midtjylland	13
4	(Sweden) Mikael Ishak	Randers FC	11
5	(Denmark) Rasmus Kanstrup Festersen	FC Vestsjælland	10
5	(Denmark) Anders Kvindebjerg Jacobsen	AaB	10
5	(Denmark) Nicolai Jørgensen	FC Copenhagen	10
5	(Denmark) Uffe Manich Bech	FC Nordsjælland	10
9	(Nigeria) Sylvester Emeka Igboun	FC Midtjylland	9
9	(Finland) Teemu Pukki	Brøndby IF	9
9	(Senegal) Baye Djiby Fall	Randers FC	9
9	(Germany) Marvin Pourié	SønderjyskE	9

Source: Goalscorers

== Awards ==
=== Monthly awards ===
Month	Player of the Month		Reference
Month	Player	Club	Reference
August	(Zimbabwe) Quincy Antipas	Hobro IK	
September	(Nigeria) Sylvester Igboun	FC Midtjylland	
October	(Finland) Teemu Pukki	Brøndby IF	
November	(Sweden) Karl-Johan Johnsson	Randers FC	
March	(Denmark) Erik Sviatchenko	FC Midtjylland	

=== Other awards ===
Season	Player	Club	Reference
Autumn	(Denmark) Pione Sisto	FC Midtjylland	

== Attendances ==
No.	Club	Average	Highest
1	FC København	15,448	32,526
2	Brøndby IF	15,143	25,551
3	FC Midtjylland	8,567	11,535
4	Esbjerg fB	7,002	10,702
5	AaB	6,881	9,923
6	OB	6,665	9,925
7	Randers FC	5,372	9,143
8	FC Nordsjælland	4,084	7,689
9	Hobro IK	3,847	6,596
10	SønderjyskE	3,832	5,643
11	Silkeborg IF	2,815	5,416
12	FC Vestsjælland	2,555	5,127
