= List of Danish football transfers winter 2015–16 =

This is a list of Danish football transfers for the 2015-16 winter transfer window. Only moves featuring at least one Danish Superliga club are listed.

The winter transfer window opened on 1 January 2016. The window closed at midnight on 1 February 2016.

== Danish Superliga ==
=== AaB ===
In: Note: Flags indicate national team as defined under FIFA eligibility rules; some limited exceptions apply. Players may hold more than one non-FIFA nationality.

No.	Pos.	Nation	Player

Out: Note: Flags indicate national team as defined under FIFA eligibility rules; some limited exceptions apply. Players may hold more than one non-FIFA nationality.

No.	Pos.	Nation	Player
5	DF	DEN	Kenneth Emil Petersen (released in summer)
6	DF	FIN	Jukka Raitala (released)
11	FW	DEN	Nicklas Helenius (on loan to (Germany) SC Paderborn 07)
20	FW	DEN	Henrik Dalsgaard (to (Belgium) Zulte Waregem)
28	FW	DEN	Viktor Ahlmann (on loan to (Denmark) Jammerbugt)
33	FW	LTU	Lukas Spalvis (to (Portugal) Sporting CP, from 1 July 2016)

=== AGF ===
In: Note: Flags indicate national team as defined under FIFA eligibility rules; some limited exceptions apply. Players may hold more than one non-FIFA nationality.

No.	Pos.	Nation	Player
3	DF	SWE	Niklas Backman (from (China) Dalian Yifang)

Out: Note: Flags indicate national team as defined under FIFA eligibility rules; some limited exceptions apply. Players may hold more than one non-FIFA nationality.

No.	Pos.	Nation	Player
14	MF	IRQ	Ahmed Yasin Ghani (to (Sweden) AIK)

=== Brøndby ===
In: Note: Flags indicate national team as defined under FIFA eligibility rules; some limited exceptions apply. Players may hold more than one non-FIFA nationality.

No.	Pos.	Nation	Player
3	DF	SWE	Michael Almebäck (loan return from (Denmark) Esbjerg)
20	FW	POL	Kamil Wilczek (from (Italy) Carpi)
—	FW	SWE	Gustaf Nilsson (from (Sweden) Falkenberg, he will join his new club on 13 June 2016)

Out: Note: Flags indicate national team as defined under FIFA eligibility rules; some limited exceptions apply. Players may hold more than one non-FIFA nationality.

No.	Pos.	Nation	Player
3	DF	NOR	Fredrik Semb Berge (to (Norway) Odd, previously on loan at (Norway) Molde)
14	FW	KOS	Elba Rashani (on loan to (Norway) Rosenborg)
20	DF	DEN	Dario Dumić (on loan to (Netherlands) NEC)

=== Esbjerg ===
In: Note: Flags indicate national team as defined under FIFA eligibility rules; some limited exceptions apply. Players may hold more than one non-FIFA nationality.

No.	Pos.	Nation	Player
19	MF	DEN	Jesper Jørgensen (from (Belgium) Zulte Waregem)
23	DF	NOR	Andreas Nordvik (from (Norway) Sarpsborg 08)
—	DF	DEN	Nikolaj Hagelskjær (from (Denmark) Fredericia)

Out: Note: Flags indicate national team as defined under FIFA eligibility rules; some limited exceptions apply. Players may hold more than one non-FIFA nationality.

No.	Pos.	Nation	Player
19	DF	SWE	Michael Almebäck (loan return to (Denmark) Brøndby)
20	MF	DEN	Hans Henrik Andreasen (released)

=== Copenhagen ===
In: Note: Flags indicate national team as defined under FIFA eligibility rules; some limited exceptions apply. Players may hold more than one non-FIFA nationality.

No.	Pos.	Nation	Player
5	DF	SWE	Erik Johansson (from (Belgium) Gent)
35	MF	CIV	Aboubakar Keita (Promoted)
—	MF	DEN	Rasmus Falk (from (Denmark) OB, he will join his new club in summer 2016)

Out: Note: Flags indicate national team as defined under FIFA eligibility rules; some limited exceptions apply. Players may hold more than one non-FIFA nationality.

No.	Pos.	Nation	Player
18	DF	GHA	Daniel Amartey (to (England) Leicester City)
31	GK	DEN	Jakob Busk (to (Germany) Union Berlin, previously on loan at (Norway) Sandefjord)
36	MF	FRO	Brandur Olsen (on loan to (Denmark) Vendsyssel)

=== Midtjylland ===
In: Note: Flags indicate national team as defined under FIFA eligibility rules; some limited exceptions apply. Players may hold more than one non-FIFA nationality.

No.	Pos.	Nation	Player
14	FW	CZE	Václav Kadlec (from (Germany) Eintracht Frankfurt)

Out: Note: Flags indicate national team as defined under FIFA eligibility rules; some limited exceptions apply. Players may hold more than one non-FIFA nationality.

No.	Pos.	Nation	Player
4	DF	DEN	Erik Sviatchenko (to (Scotland) Celtic)
19	MF	DEN	Marco Larsen (on loan to (Denmark) Vejle)
37	DF	DEN	Rasmus Lauritsen (to (Denmark) Skive)
—	GK	DEN	Lasse Heinze (retired, previously on loan to (Norway) Sarpsborg 08)

=== Nordsjælland ===
In: Note: Flags indicate national team as defined under FIFA eligibility rules; some limited exceptions apply. Players may hold more than one non-FIFA nationality.

No.	Pos.	Nation	Player
9	FW	DEN	Tobias Mikkelsen (from (Norway) Rosenborg)

Out: Note: Flags indicate national team as defined under FIFA eligibility rules; some limited exceptions apply. Players may hold more than one non-FIFA nationality.

No.	Pos.	Nation	Player
11	FW	BRA	Bruninho (to (China) Guangzhou R&F)
—	DF	CRO	Ivan Runje (to (Cyprus) Omonia, previously on loan)

=== Hobro ===
In: Note: Flags indicate national team as defined under FIFA eligibility rules; some limited exceptions apply. Players may hold more than one non-FIFA nationality.

No.	Pos.	Nation	Player
—	DF	USA	Babajide Ogunbiyi (from (Denmark) Viborg)

Out: Note: Flags indicate national team as defined under FIFA eligibility rules; some limited exceptions apply. Players may hold more than one non-FIFA nationality.

No.	Pos.	Nation	Player
7	DF	DEN	Rasmus Ingemann (released)
33	DF	MLI	Adama Tamboura (released)

=== OB ===
In: Note: Flags indicate national team as defined under FIFA eligibility rules; some limited exceptions apply. Players may hold more than one non-FIFA nationality.

No.	Pos.	Nation	Player
—	DF	DEN	Frederik Tingager (from (Denmark) Holbæk)

Out: Note: Flags indicate national team as defined under FIFA eligibility rules; some limited exceptions apply. Players may hold more than one non-FIFA nationality.

No.	Pos.	Nation	Player
2	DF	DEN	Mikkel Kirkeskov (to (Norway) Aalesund)
9	MF	DEN	Rasmus Falk (to (Denmark) København, he will join his new club in summer 2016)
26	MF	DEN	Matti Lund Nielsen (released)

=== Randers ===
In: Note: Flags indicate national team as defined under FIFA eligibility rules; some limited exceptions apply. Players may hold more than one non-FIFA nationality.

No.	Pos.	Nation	Player

Out: Note: Flags indicate national team as defined under FIFA eligibility rules; some limited exceptions apply. Players may hold more than one non-FIFA nationality.

No.	Pos.	Nation	Player

=== SønderjyskE ===
In: Note: Flags indicate national team as defined under FIFA eligibility rules; some limited exceptions apply. Players may hold more than one non-FIFA nationality.

No.	Pos.	Nation	Player
—	MF	SWE	Simon Kroon (from (Sweden) Malmö)
—	MF	DEN	Marcel Rømer (from (Denmark) Viborg)

Out: Note: Flags indicate national team as defined under FIFA eligibility rules; some limited exceptions apply. Players may hold more than one non-FIFA nationality.

No.	Pos.	Nation	Player

=== Viborg ===
In: Note: Flags indicate national team as defined under FIFA eligibility rules; some limited exceptions apply. Players may hold more than one non-FIFA nationality.

No.	Pos.	Nation	Player

Out: Note: Flags indicate national team as defined under FIFA eligibility rules; some limited exceptions apply. Players may hold more than one non-FIFA nationality.

No.	Pos.	Nation	Player
8	MF	DEN	Marcel Rømer (to (Denmark) SønderjyskE)
14	DF	USA	Babajide Ogunbiyi (to (Denmark) Hobro)
