= Kusk =

Kusk is surname literally meaning "coachman" in the Danish, Swedish, and Norwegian languages. Notable people with the surname include:

- Kasper Kusk (born 1991), Danish footballer
- Søren Kusk (born 1960), Danish politician
