= 2015–16 Danish Superliga =

26th season of Danish Superliga

Danish Superliga
- Season: 2015–16
- Champions: Copenhagen
- Relegated: Hobro
- Champions League: Copenhagen
- Europa League: SønderjyskE; Midtjylland; Brøndby
- Matches: 198
- Goals: 549 (2.77 per match)
- Top goalscorer: Lukas Spalvis (18)
- Biggest home win: AaB 6–0 Hobro (1 November 2015)
- Biggest away win: Hobro 0-6 Viborg (5 March 2016)
- Highest scoring: Esbjerg 4–4 Hobro (22 November 2015) Copenhagen 6–2 AaB (13 March 2016)
- Longest winning run: SønderjyskE (5)
- Longest unbeaten run: Copenhagen (9)
- Longest winless run: Hobro (9)
- Longest losing run: Hobro (5)

The 2015–16 Danish Superliga season was the 26th season of the Danish Superliga, which decides the Danish football championship. Midtjylland were the defending champions.

As Denmark dropped from nineteenth to twenty-second place in the 2015 UEFA association coefficient rankings at the end of the 2014–15 season, the champion of the league will qualify for the UEFA Champions League; that club will commence its campaign in the second qualifying round. Furthermore, the second and third-place clubs will enter the UEFA Europa League in the first qualifying round.

Only one team was relegated after the season due to the Superliga expanding to 14 teams from the beginning of the 2016–17 season.

== Teams ==
FC Vestsjælland and Silkeborg IF finished the 2014–15 season in 11th and 12th place, respectively, and were relegated to the 2015–16 1st Division.

The relegated teams were replaced by 2014–15 1st Division champions Viborg FF and the runners-up AGF.

A new sponsorship agreement for Randers Stadium was presented on 22 September 2015, when the Fårup-based fertilizer company BioNutria acquired the naming rights for the stadium from AutoC, effectively changing the name of the home field of Randers FC from AutoC Park Randers to BioNutria Park Randers. Last in the season, the stadium of FC Nordsjælland changed its official name to Right to Dream Park following a naming rights agreement with the young academy Right to Dream, taking effect on 27 April 2016.

=== Stadia and locations ===
Locations of the Danish Superliga 2015–16 teams

Club	Location	Stadium	Turf	Capacity	2014–15 position
AaB	Aalborg	Nordjyske Arena	Natural	13,797	5th
AGF	Aarhus	Ceres Park	Natural	20,032	1D, 2nd
Brøndby IF	Brøndby	Brøndby Stadium	Natural	29,000	3rd
Esbjerg fB	Esbjerg	Blue Water Arena	Natural	18,000	8th
FC Copenhagen	Copenhagen	Telia Parken	Natural	38,065	2nd
FC Midtjylland	Herning	MCH Arena	Natural	11,800	1st
FC Nordsjælland	Farum	Farum Park (until 26 April 2016); Right to Dream Park (from 27 April 2016)	Artificial	9,900	6th
Hobro IK	Hobro	DS Arena	Natural	7,500	7th
OB	Odense	TRE-FOR Park	Natural	15,633	9th
Randers FC	Randers	AutoC Park Randers (until 21 September 2015); BioNutria Park Randers (from 22 September 2015)	Natural	12,000	4th
SønderjyskE	Haderslev	Sydbank Park	Natural	10,000	10th
Viborg FF	Viborg	Energi Viborg Arena	Natural	9,566	1D, 1st

=== Personnel and sponsoring ===
Note: Flags indicate national team as has been defined under FIFA eligibility rules. Players and Managers may hold more than one non-FIFA nationality.

Team	Head coach	Captain	Kit manufacturer	Shirt sponsor
AaB	(Denmark) Lars Søndergaard	(Denmark) Rasmus Würtz	hummel	Spar Nord
AGF	(Denmark) Glen Riddersholm	(Denmark) Steffen Rasmussen	hummel	Ceres
Brøndby IF	(Lithuania) Aurelijus Skarbalius	(Denmark) Thomas Kahlenberg	hummel	Bet25.dk
Esbjerg fB	(Denmark) Jonas Dal	(Denmark) Hans Henrik Andreasen	Nike	Sydenergi
F.C. Copenhagen	(Norway) Ståle Solbakken	(Denmark) Thomas Delaney	adidas	Carlsberg
FC Midtjylland	(Denmark) Jess Thorup	(Denmark) Kristian Bak Nielsen	Nike	Hessel
FC Nordsjælland	(Denmark) Kasper Hjulmand	(Denmark) Patrick Mtiliga	Diadora	DHL
Hobro IK	(Denmark) Ove Pedersen	(Denmark) Mads Justesen	Puma	DS Gruppen, Spar Nord
OB	(Denmark) Kent Nielsen	(Iceland) Hallgrímur Jónasson	hummel	Carlsberg
Randers FC	(England) Colin Todd	(Denmark) Christian Keller	Puma	Verdo
SønderjyskE	(Denmark) Jakob Michelsen	(Denmark) Niels Lodberg	hummel	Frøs Herreds Sparekasse
Viborg	(Denmark) Johnny Mølby	(Denmark) Mikkel Rask	Nike	Andelskassen

=== Managerial changes ===
Team	Outgoing manager	Manner of departure	Date of vacancy	Replaced by	Date of appointment	Position in table
AaB	(Denmark) Kent Nielsen	End of contract and signed by OB	1 June 2015	(Denmark) Lars Søndergaard	1 July 2015	Pre-Season
OB	(Denmark) Ove Pedersen	End of contract	1 June 2015	(Denmark) Kent Nielsen	1 July 2015	Pre-Season
SønderjyskE	(Denmark) Lars Søndergaard	End of contract and signed by AaB	1 June 2015	(Denmark) Jakob Michelsen	1 July 2015	Pre-Season
Viborg FF	(Lithuania) Aurelijus Skarbalius	Mutual consent	6 June 2015	(Denmark) Johnny Mølby	9 June 2015	Pre-Season
FC Midtjylland	(Denmark) Glen Riddersholm	Resigned	26 June 2015	(Denmark) Jess Thorup	12 July 2015	Pre-Season
Esbjerg fB	(Denmark) Niels Frederiksen	Sacked	10 August 2015	(Denmark) Michael Mex Pedersen (interim)	10 August 2015	12th
Esbjerg fB	(Denmark) Michael Mex Pedersen	End of tenure as caretaker	20 October 2015	(Denmark) Jonas Dal	20 October 2015	10th
Hobro IK	(Denmark) Jonas Dal	Signed by Esbjerg fB	20 October 2015	(Denmark) Lars Justesen (interim)	20 October 2015	12th
Hobro IK	(Denmark) Lars Justesen	End of tenure as caretaker	24 November 2015	(Denmark) Ove Pedersen	24 November 2015	12th
AGF	(Denmark) Morten Wieghorst	Sacked	5 December 2015	(Denmark) Glen Riddersholm	6 December 2015	9th
FC Nordsjælland	(Iceland) Ólafur Kristjánsson	Sacked	15 December 2015	(Denmark) Kasper Hjulmand	1 January 2016	8th
Brøndby IF	(Denmark) Thomas Frank	Resigned	9 March 2016	(Lithuania) Aurelijus Skarbalius	9 March 2016	5th

== League table ==
Pos	Team	Pld	W	D	L	GF	GA	GD	Pts	Qualification or relegation
1	Copenhagen (C)	33	21	8	4	62	28	+34	71	Qualification for the Champions League second qualifying round (Note: Copenhagen qualified for the Europa League second qualifying round by winning the 2015–16 Danish Cup. However, since they already qualified for European competition based on their league position, the spot awarded to the cup winners was passed down the league.)
2	SønderjyskE	33	19	5	9	56	36	+20	62	Qualification for the Europa League second qualifying round
3	Midtjylland	33	17	8	8	57	33	+24	59	Qualification for the Europa League first qualifying round
4	Brøndby	33	16	6	11	43	37	+6	54	Qualification for the Europa League first qualifying round
5	AaB	33	15	5	13	56	44	+12	50	
6	Randers	33	13	8	12	45	43	+2	47	
7	Odense	33	14	4	15	50	52	−2	46	
8	Viborg	33	11	7	15	34	42	−8	40	
9	Nordsjælland	33	11	5	17	35	51	−16	38	
10	AGF	33	8	13	12	47	49	−2	37	
11	Esbjerg	33	7	9	17	38	64	−26	30	
12	Hobro (R)	33	4	6	23	26	70	−44	18	Relegation to the Danish 1st Division

Source: DBU, Soccerway
Rules for classification: 1) Points; 2) Goal difference; 3) Goals scored; 4) Head-to-head points; 5) Head-to-head goal difference; 6) Head-to-head goals scored; 7) Head-to-head away goals scored; 8) Play-off on neutral ground (only if rankings are important for medals, teams for relegation or teams for UEFA competitions); 9) Draw.
(C) Champions; (R) Relegated

=== Positions by round ===
Team ╲ Round	1	2	3	4	5	6	7	8	9	10	11	12	13	14	15	16	17	18	19	20	21	22	23	24	25	26	27	28	29	30	31	32	33
Copenhagen	1	1	1	2	2	2	3	2	1	3	2	2	1	1	1	1	1	1	1	1	1	1	1	1	1	1	1	1	1	1	1	1	1
SønderjyskE	3	6	8	5	3	4	2	5	4	2	4	3	3	5	6	5	4	4	4	3	2	2	3	3	2	2	2	2	2	2	2	2	2
Midtjylland	3	3	2	1	1	1	1	1	2	1	1	1	2	2	2	2	3	3	3	4	3	5	4	4	3	3	4	4	3	3	3	3	3
Brøndby	8	10	12	11	9	7	4	6	9	6	8	6	4	3	4	4	5	5	5	5	5	4	5	5	5	5	5	5	5	4	4	4	4
AaB	6	4	5	8	7	3	6	7	6	7	5	4	6	4	3	3	2	2	2	2	4	3	2	2	4	4	3	3	4	5	5	5	5
Randers FC	11	7	7	7	6	8	5	4	3	4	3	5	5	6	5	6	6	6	6	6	7	9	7	7	7	7	7	6	7	6	6	6	6
OB	1	1	4	4	5	9	8	8	7	9	6	8	8	9	8	8	7	7	7	7	6	6	6	6	6	6	6	7	6	7	7	7	7
Viborg FF	9	9	6	6	8	6	9	11	11	10	11	11	10	10	10	10	9	10	10	9	8	7	8	8	9	9	8	8	8	8	8	10	8
Nordsjælland	9	12	10	10	11	10	10	9	8	5	7	9	7	7	7	7	8	8	8	8	9	8	9	9	8	8	9	9	9	9	9	8	9
AGF	5	4	3	3	4	5	6	3	5	8	9	7	9	8	9	9	10	9	9	10	10	10	10	10	10	11	11	10	10	10	10	9	10
Esbjerg fB	6	8	11	12	10	11	11	10	10	11	10	10	11	11	11	11	11	11	11	11	11	11	11	11	11	10	10	11	11	11	11	11	11
Hobro	11	11	9	8	12	12	12	12	12	12	12	12	12	12	12	12	12	12	12	12	12	12	12	12	12	12	12	12	12	12	12	12	12

Source: Weltfussball

== Results ==
=== Matchday 1–11 ===
Home \ Away	AaB	AGF	BIF	EfB	FCK	FCM	FCN	HIK	OB	RFC	SJE	VFF
AaB			4–1	1–1		0–2			5–1	0–2	5–0	
AGF	2–3		2–1	0–0						3–2	1–2	
Brøndby				1–1	1–0	0–0		0–2	1–2		1–0	
Esbjerg fB					1–2	1–1			4–2	0–2	0–4	
Copenhagen	4–2	2–2					1–1	1–0		3–0		1–0
Midtjylland		2–0			0–0		0–1	2–0	1–0			2–0
Nordsjælland	2–1	2–0	0–2	1–2					1–5		0–2	
Hobro	0–1	0–3		2–2			1–3					1–1
OB		2–2			1–0			3–0		2–3		2–0
Randers FC			3–3			0–2	3–0	2–1			1–0	0–1
SønderjyskE					1–3	1–2		3–0	4–0			2–1
Viborg FF	1–0	0–0	0–4	2–1			0–1					

Source: Danish Football Association (in Danish)
Legend: Blue = home team win; Yellow = draw; Red = away team win.

=== Matchday 12–33 ===
Home \ Away	AaB	AGF	BIF	EfB	FCK	FCM	FCN	HIK	OB	RFC	SJE	VFF
AaB		2–2	3–0	1–2	0–2	0–0	1–0	6–0	0–1	3–2	1–2	2–0
AGF	2–0		1–1	5–1	0–0	2–1	3–0	1–1	2–1	0–2	0–0	1–2
Brøndby	0–2	2–1		0–0	0–0	2–1	2–1	1–0	1–0	1–0	1–2	0–1
Esbjerg fB	1–2	2–1	2–3		1–4	0–2	2–1	4–4	0–2	1–0	0–1	1–0
Copenhagen	6–2	2–1	2–0	2–1		5–3	2–0	3–1	4–1	4–0	1–0	0–0
Midtjylland	1–1	1–1	2–0	5–1	0–1		4–1	3–0	2–0	2–1	3–2	2–4
Nordsjælland	3–0	3–3	0–2	0–0	2–0	2–1		2–1	0–1	2–2	1–2	1–0
Hobro	0–2	3–1	0–2	2–2	4–2	1–4	0–1		0–2	0–0	1–2	0–6
OB	3–2	2–2	2–5	2–1	0–1	1–1	3–1	0–1		0–1	1–2	5–1
Randers FC	0–0	4–1	0–2	3–1	1–1	1–2	1–0	2–0	1–1		1–1	1–3
SønderjyskE	1–2	2–2	3–1	2–0	1–2	3–2	3–1	2–0	3–1	1–1		2–0
Viborg FF	0–2	1–0	0–2	4–2	1–1	1–1	1–1	1–0	0–1	2–3	0–0	

Source: Danish Football Association (in Danish)
Legend: Blue = home team win; Yellow = draw; Red = away team win.

== Top goalscorers ==
Rank	Goalscorer	Team	Goals
1	(Lithuania) Lukas Spalvis	AaB	18
2	(Denmark) Nicolai Jørgensen	Copenhagen	15
3	(Paraguay) Federico Santander	Copenhagen	14
3	(Denmark) Rasmus Festersen	OB	14
3	(Denmark) Morten Rasmussen	AGF	14
6	(Austria) Martin Pušić	Midtjylland	13
7	(Denmark) Johan Absalonsen	SønderjyskE	12
7	(Denmark) Thomas Enevoldsen	AaB	12
7	(Denmark) Anders K. Jacobsen	OB	12
7	(Sweden) Mikael Ishak	Randers FC	12
11	(Denmark) Jeppe Curth	Viborg FF	10
12	(Brazil) Bruninho	Nordsjælland	9
12	(Costa Rica) Mayron George	Hobro IK	9
12	(Denmark) Tommy Bechmann	SønderjyskE	9
12	(Denmark) Nicolaj Madsen	SønderjyskE	9
12	(Finland) Teemu Pukki	Brøndby IF	9

Updated to games played on 29 May 2016
Source: WorldFootball.net

== Awards ==
Award	Winner	Club
Player of the Year	(Denmark) Thomas Delaney	Copenhagen
Top Scorer	(Denmark) Lukas Spalvis	AaB

=== Team of the Season ===
Team of the Season
Goalkeeper	(Denmark) Frederik Rønnow (Brøndby)			
Defenders	(Denmark) Peter Ankersen (Copenhagen)	(Denmark) Mathias Jørgensen (Copenhagen)	(Denmark) Erik Sviatchenko (Midtjylland)	(Denmark) Ludwig Augustinsson (Copenhagen)
Midfielders	(Denmark) Rasmus Falk (OB)	(Denmark) Thomas Delaney (Copenhagen)	(Denmark) Rasmus Würtz (AaB)	(Denmark) Nicolaj Thomsen (AaB)
Forwards	(Denmark) Lukas Spalvis (AaB)		(Paraguay) Federico Santander (Copenhagen)	

== Attendances ==
No.	Club	Average	Highest
1	FC København	16,191	29,178
2	Brøndby IF	12,782	25,102
3	AGF	7,626	13,437
4	FC Midtjylland	7,590	10,822
5	AaB	7,280	10,036
6	OB	6,972	10,272
7	Esbjerg fB	5,977	9,255
8	SønderjyskE	5,848	8,210
9	Randers FC	5,367	8,541
10	Viborg FF	4,603	7,747
11	FC Nordsjælland	3,726	7,351
12	Hobro IK	2,486	4,686
