= Pallesen =

Pallesen is a Danish surname. Notable people with the surname include:

- Kristoffer Pallesen (born 1990), Danish footballer
- Per Pallesen (born 1942), Danish actor
- Søren Pallesen (born 1977), Danish footballer
- Trine Pallesen (born 1969), Danish actress, daughter of Per
