= Kim Brink =

Danish football manager

Personal information
- Full name: Kim Brink
- Date of birth: 19 November 1958 (age 67)
- Place of birth: Denmark

Managerial career
- Years: Team
- 1991–1995: Odense Boldklub
- 1995–1996: Ikast fS
- 1996–1997: F.C. Copenhagen
- 1998: F.C. Copenhagen
- 1999–2000: F.C. Copenhagen
- 2000–2010: Odense Boldklub (Director of Sports)
- 2011–2012: FC Fyn (Director of Sports)
- 2012–2013: Vejle Kolding (Director of Sports)
- 2013: Vejle Kolding

Kim Brink (born 19 November 1958) is a Danish football manager.

== Coaching career ==
Kim Brink started as manager of Odense Boldklub, and later managed Ikast fS and F.C. Copenhagen.

== Odense Boldklub ==
He was the Odense Boldklub manager, at the time of the 'Miracle in Madrid', a match between Odense Boldklub and Real Madrid on 6 December 1994 in the Santiago Bernabeu in Madrid in the fourth round of the 1994-95 UEFA Cup. Real Madrid was defending a 3-2 win from the first match in Odense. Against all odds, Odense Boldklub sensationally won the match 2-0, and progressed to the quarter finals, where they were eliminated by the eventual winners Parma FC.

In 2000, he became Director of Sports of Odense Boldklub. He was sacked in September 2010 together with manager Lars Olsen and assistant manager Viggo Jensen.

In February 2011 Brink was announced the new Director of Sports in FC Fyn.

In January 2012 he was named new Director of Sports at Vejle Kolding, and on 8 January 2013 he also took charge as manager of the team. He left the club by mutual consent at the end of the 2012-13 season.
