= Michael Hansen (footballer) =

Danish football manager (born 1971)

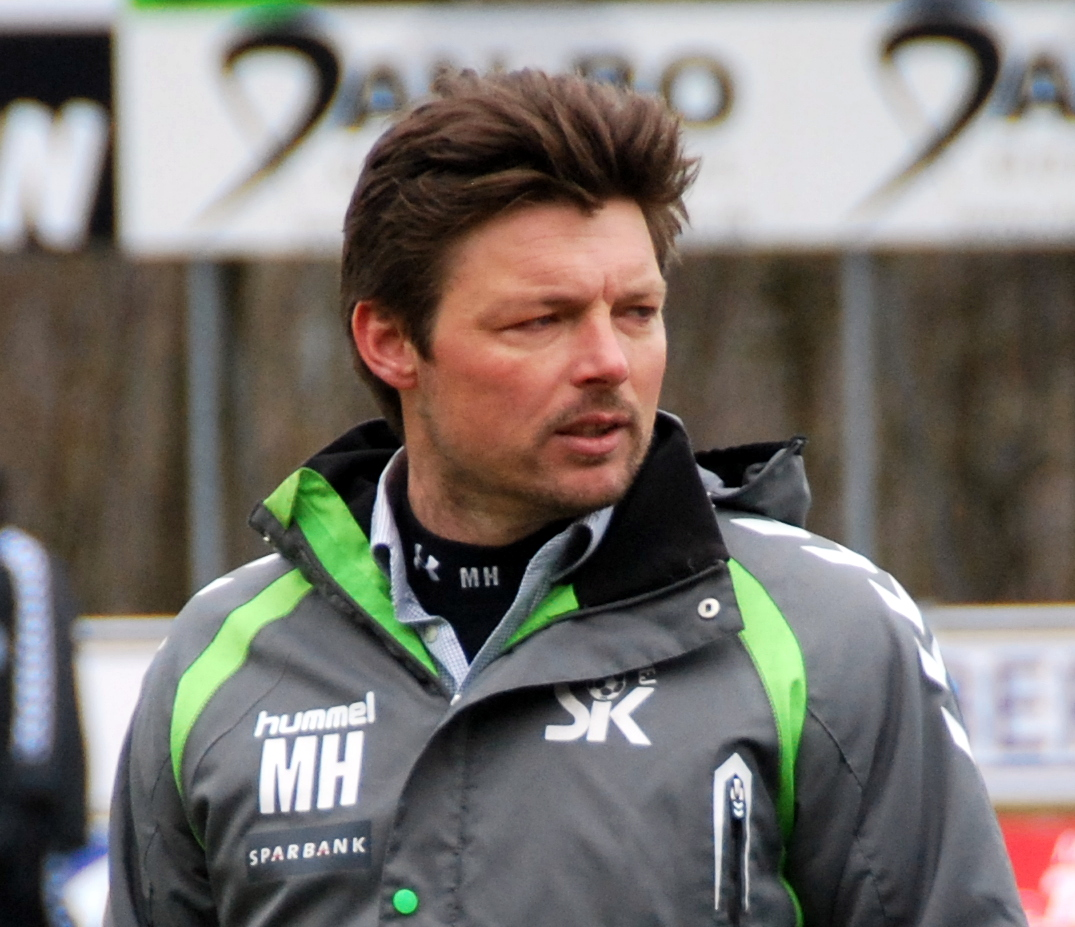
- Hansen in 2012

Personal information
- Full name: Michael Hansen
- Date of birth: 22 September 1971 (age 55)
- Place of birth: Nykøbing Falster, Denmark
- Position: Midfielder

Team information
- Current team: Fredericia (head coach)

Youth career
- B 1921
- B 1901

Senior career*
Years	Team	Apps	(Gls)
1987–1989	B 1901		
1989–1990	Næstved		
1991–1996	Silkeborg	184	(33)
1996–1998	OB	58	(8)
1999–2000	NAC Breda	29	(3)
2000–2003	Esbjerg fB	83	(31)
2003–2005	Midtjylland	84	(9)
2006–2007	Silkeborg	31	(6)

International career
1987–1988	Denmark U17	8	(0)
1988–1991	Denmark U19	16	(1)
1990–1993	Denmark U21	16	(1)
1995–2003	Denmark League XI	4	(1)

Managerial career
- 2008–2013: Skive IK
- 2014–2015: Vestsjælland
- 2018–2019: Silkeborg
- 2020–: Fredericia
- * Club domestic league appearances and goals

Michael Hansen (born 22 September 1971) is a Danish professional football manager and former player who is the head coach of the Danish Superliga club Fredericia.

== Club career ==
Hansen played as a midfielder throughout his career. He began his youth football at B 1921 before joining B 1901 in his hometown of Nykøbing Falster in 1985. He made his senior debut at the age of 16 and later moved to Næstved IF at 18, competing in the Danish Superliga.

Over the course of his senior career, he played for several Danish clubs, including Silkeborg, OB, Esbjerg fB, and Midtjylland. He retired from professional football in 2006.

== International career ==
Hansen made 40 appearances and scored two goals for various Danish youth national teams. He was part of the Denmark under-21 team that competed at the 1992 Summer Olympics in Barcelona.

== Managerial career ==
On 1 August 2007, Hansen was appointed player-assistant coach at Skive IK, then competing in the Danish 1st Division under head coach Søren Frederiksen. After only four months in the role, Hansen was promoted to head coach in December 2007 following Frederiksen's departure to become assistant coach at Viborg FF. Hansen officially assumed the position on 1 January 2008, with Skive's then-goalkeeper Martin S. Jensen serving as his assistant. In January 2010, Jensen was succeeded by Claus Madsen, a former teammate of Hansen's at Midtjylland. Hansen remained in charge until the end of the 2012–13 season, departing the club following its relegation to the Danish 2nd Division.

In June 2013, Hansen joined Vestsjælland, newly promoted to the Danish Superliga, as assistant and first team coach under manager Ove Pedersen. After one year as assistant, he was named head coach in May 2014, signing a contract through to the summer of 2016. However, his first season in charge ended in relegation, and following a poor start to the subsequent campaign in the 1st Division, he was dismissed on 1 September 2015.

Following his coaching tenures, Hansen was appointed director of Ringkøbing IF, a position he held until 31 May 2018.

On 15 August 2018, he returned to management as head coach of Silkeborg, signing a contract through to 31 May 2019. After the season, he transitioned into a development role as head of coaching at the club.

On 30 August 2020, Hansen was named head coach of Fredericia, succeeding Jonas Dal. During Hansen's tenure, Fredericia consistently competed in the upper half of the Danish 1st Division and reached the semi-finals of the Danish Cup in the 2023–24 season. In February 2024, his contract was extended through to the summer of 2026.

== Honours ==
Silkeborg

- Danish Superliga: 1993–94
- UEFA Intertoto Cup: 1996
