= Lasse Kronborg =

Danish footballer (born 1986)

Personal information
- Full name: Lasse Nis-Hansen Kronborg
- Date of birth: April 3, 1986 (age 40)
- Place of birth: Silkeborg, Denmark
- Height: 1.79 m (5 ft 10 in)
- Position: Midfielder

Youth career
- Silkeborg IF
- Vejle Boldklub

Senior career*
Years	Team	Apps	(Gls)
2004–2007	Vejle Boldklub	35	(2)
2007	Hedensted IF	10	(3)
2007–2009	Herfølge Boldklub	29	(3)
2009–2012	HB Køge	84	(12)
2012–2013	Vejle-Kolding	16	(2)
2013–2014	Vejle Boldklub	9	(0)
2014–2015	FC Fredericia	14	(1)
Total		197	(23)

International career
2003–2004	Denmark U18	5	(1)
2004	Denmark U19	3	(1)
- * Club domestic league appearances and goals

Lasse Nis-Hansen Kronborg (born 3 April 1986) is a Danish former professional footballer who played as a midfielder. He has previously represented Vejle Boldklub and HB Køge in the Superliga. He played eight games and scored two goals for various Danish youth national teams from 2003 to 2004.

== Career ==
Kronborg made his senior debut with Vejle Boldklub in April 2004. He played 35 league games and scored two goals for the club, including two Superliga games in the 2006–07 season. He asked to have his Vejle contract terminated in April 2007, the day after his 21st birthday. He continued playing amateur football with Hedensted IF, who had just qualified for the Jutland Series. He played his first match for the new club in April 2007. In June 2007, he returned to professional football, as he signed with Herfølge BK, later known as HB Køge. Kronborg returned to the Superliga with HB Køge for the 2009–10 season.
