= Nicolai Wael =

Danish football manager (born 1972)

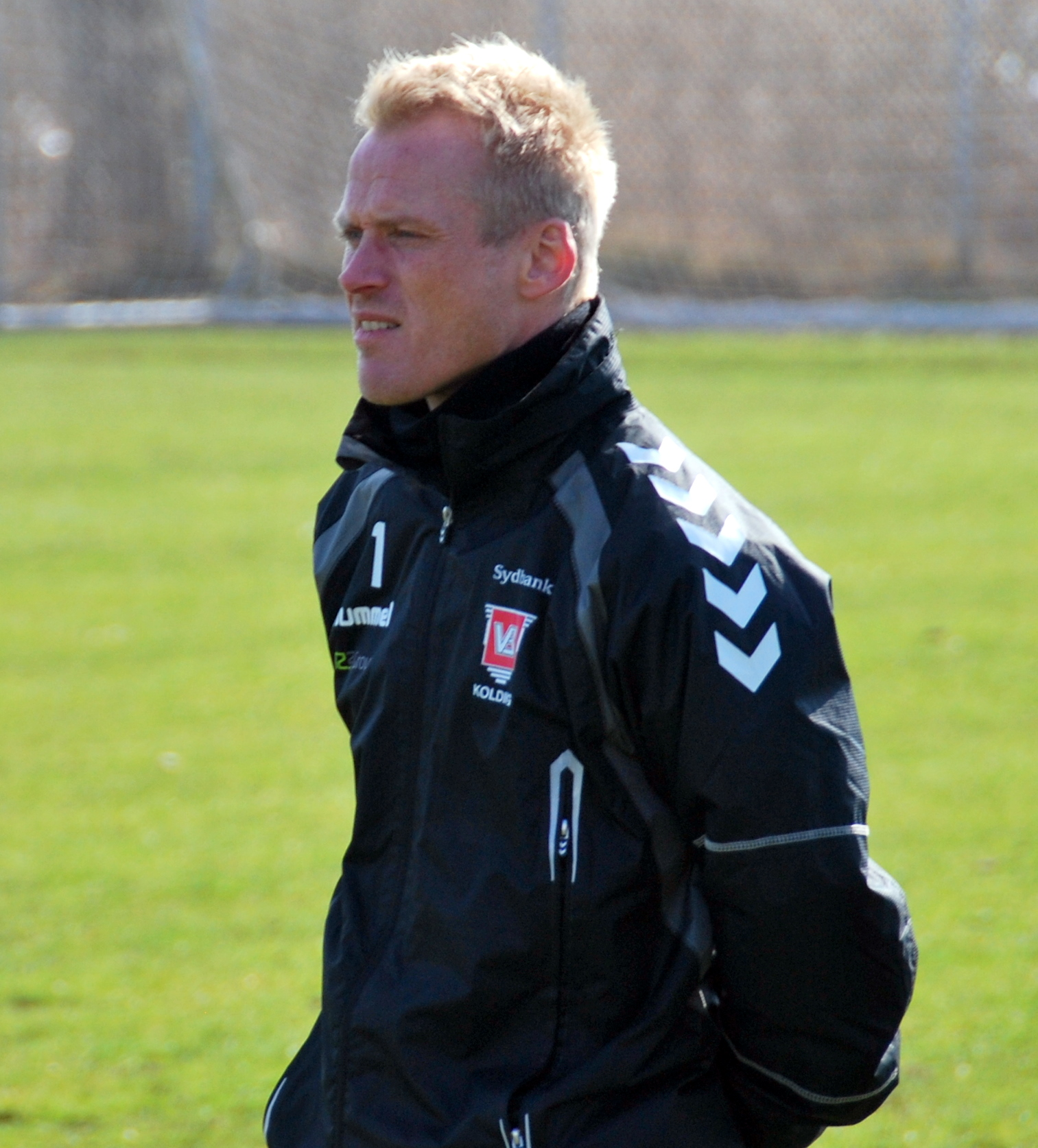
- Wael in 2012

Personal information
- Date of birth: 10 May 1972 (age 54)
- Place of birth: Vallensbæk, Denmark

Team information
- Current team: Ringkøbing IF (head coach)

Youth career
- Vallensbæk IF
- KB

Senior career*
Years	Team	Apps	(Gls)
1991–1992	KB	1	(0)
1992–1993	Copenhagen	0	(0)
1993–1996	Næstved		
1996	Lyngby		
1997–1998	Vejle	59	(16)
1998–2001	OB		
2001	Silkeborg		
2002–2005	SønderjyskE		

International career
1988–1992	Denmark U19	14	(2)
1993	Denmark U21	2	(1)

Managerial career
- 2006–2009: SønderjyskE (assistant)
- 2009–2011: Vejle BK (assistant)
- 2011–2013: Vejle Kolding
- 2013–2015: FC Fredericia
- 2015–2020: Ringkøbing IF
- 2023–: Ringkøbing IF
- * Club domestic league appearances and goals

Nicolai Wael (born 10 May 1972) is a Danish professional football manager and former player who is the head coach of Denmark Series club Ringkøbing IF.

== Managerial career ==
In April 2013 it was announced that he would replace Thomas Thomasberg as manager of FC Fredericia form the beginning of the 2013–14 season. He was sacked on 13 April 2015 due to a poor stint of 15 games without a win.

On 31 October 2015 he was named new manager of Ringkøbing IF in the Denmark Series. In 2017 he managed to get the club promoted to the Danish 2nd Divisions. He was sacked on 15 June 2020 with the club placed in the relegation zone. After a three-year absence, he returned as manager of Ringkøbing, succeeding Michael Pedersen.

== Honours ==
Silkeborg

- Danish Cup: 2000–01
