= Jens Berthel Askou =

Danish footballer (born 1982)

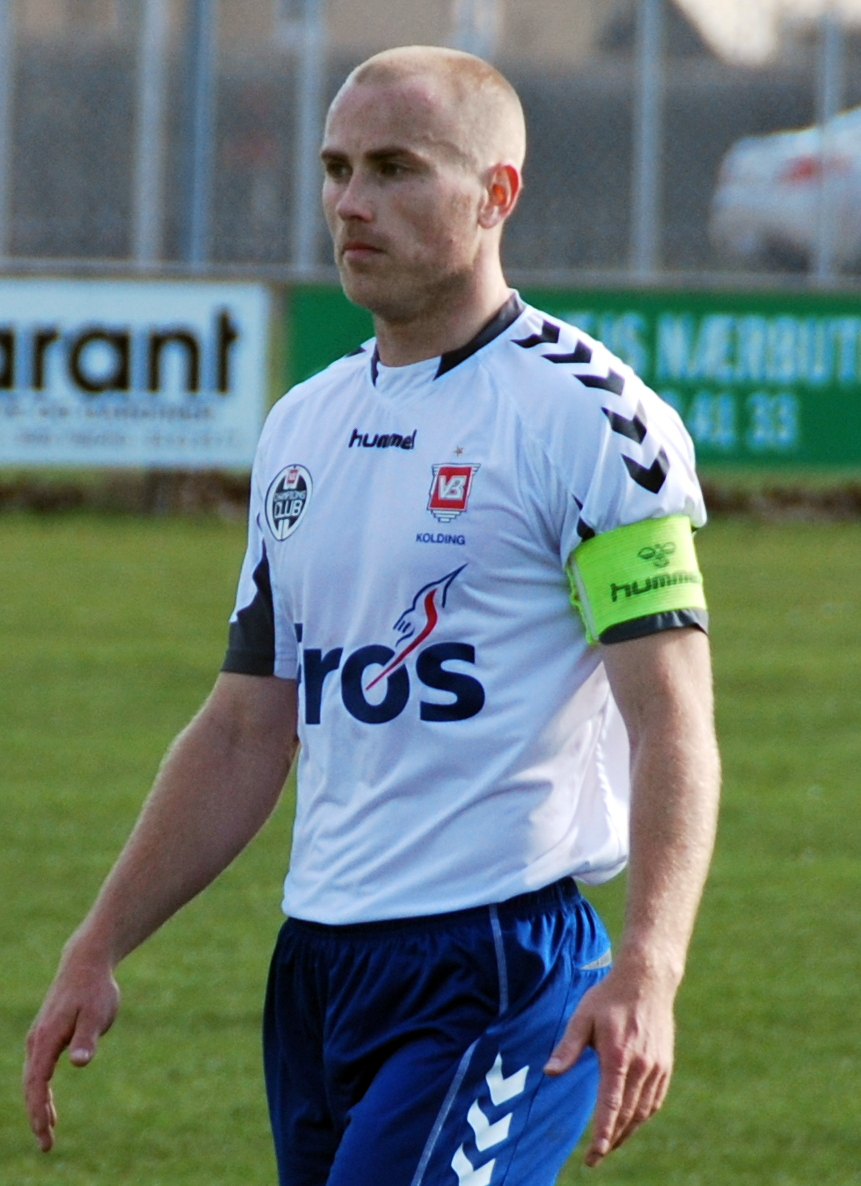
- Askou in 2012

Personal information
- Full name: Jens Berthel Askou
- Date of birth: 19 August 1982 (age 44)
- Place of birth: Videbæk, Denmark
- Height: 1.90 m (6 ft 3 in)
- Position: Centre-back

Team information
- Current team: Toulouse (manager)

Youth career
- Videbæk
- 2001–2002: Ikast FS

Senior career*
Years	Team	Apps	(Gls)
2002–2003	Holstebro	30	(5)
2003–2007	Silkeborg	122	(8)
2007–2009	Kasımpaşa	57	(2)
2009–2011	Norwich City	27	(2)
2011	→ Millwall (loan)	1	(0)
2011–2013	Vejle-Kolding	49	(3)
2013–2014	Esbjerg fB	15	(0)
2015–2016	Skive	45	(0)
2016–2017	Thisted		
2018	Vendsyssel	1	(0)
Total		347	(20)

Managerial career
- 2018–2019: Vendsyssel
- 2020–2021: HB Tórshavn
- 2021–2023: Horsens
- 2023–2024: IFK Göteborg
- 2025–2026: Motherwell
- 2026–: Toulouse
- * Club domestic league appearances and goals

Jens Berthel Askou (born 19 August 1982) is a Danish professional football manager and former player. He is currently the manager of Ligue 1 club Toulouse.

Askou played for Danish clubs before moving abroad, first to Turkish club Kasımpaşa and then to Norwich City in England, before moving back to Denmark to play for Vejle Kolding and Esbjerg. After retiring, he moved into coaching and won a domestic double with HB Tórshavn in 2020 before managing clubs in Denmark, Sweden and Scotland, leading Motherwell to European qualification in his only season in charge prior to joining Toulouse in 2026.

== Playing career ==
Born in Videbæk, Askou began his career at Ikast FS before moving to Holstebro in 2002. His performances led to a contract with 1st Division Silkeborg in the summer of 2003, following a successful trial. He helped the club regain promotion to the Danish Superliga during his first season, and became a regular for four years. In 2007, Askou failed to agree a new deal with SIF, which led to a move to Turkish football with Kasımpaşa.

Kasımpaşa finished bottom of the 2007–08 Süper Lig, with Askou appearing frequently and scoring twice. However, despite Askou's own goal in the playoffs semi-final, the club returned to the top flight at the first attempt in 2008–09. His contract was not renewed the following summer.

=== Norwich City ===
In July 2009, Askou linked up with English League One club Norwich City on their pre-season tour of Scotland. He impressed suitably with his defensive displays in the club's friendly matches, also managing to score with a header against Airdrie United. Then manager Bryan Gunn confirmed on 27 July he had offered Askou a contract. It was revealed on 30 July that Askou had signed a two-year deal with Norwich. He made his debut in a 4–0 win over Yeovil Town in the League Cup on 11 August, helping to keep a clean sheet. Four days later, he scored on his league debut as Norwich drew 1–1 with Exeter City. Askou became a regular starter for Norwich until picking up a metatarsal injury in a league game against Yeovil in December, which kept him out until May 2010.

He scored a header against Blackburn Rovers in the League Cup in August 2010; a game which Norwich lost 3–1. Askou's opportunities at Norwich were limited in the 2010–11 season, making only two Championship starts in the first half of the campaign.

In January 2011, Askou moved to fellow Championship side Millwall on a one-month loan. He was sent off on his debut against Leicester City for a two-footed lunge on Yakubu. This was his only appearance for the club and he returned to Norwich in February. He did not appear again for his parent club either and was released by the club at the end of the season after his contract expired.

=== Vejle-Kolding ===
Askou signed a two-year contract with Danish first division team Vejle-Kolding in August 2011. During his time a Vejle, he scored six goals in 55 appearances and was appointed club captain in the summer of 2012.

Askou signed a two-year deal with Esbjerg in the Danish Superliga on 2 August 2013 for an undisclosed fee.

== Coaching career ==
In 2015, Askou became playing assistant manager at Skive. A year later, he took up the same position at Thisted.

In June 2017, Askou became Erik Rasmussen's assistant manager at Vendsyssel. On 8 May 2018, Rasmussen resigned as manager and was replaced by Askou. After an overall defeat against Horsens in the Danish Superliga relegation play off games, Askou and his staff was fired on 20 May 2019.

In October 2019, Askou signed with Denmark Series 4 amateur club TIF All Stars. In the beginning of November 2019, it was confirmed that Askou would become the manager of HB Tórshavn in the Faroe Islands starting from 1 December 2019. One year later, on 5 December 2020, he had won the double with HB Tórshavn by first winning the Faroe Islands Premier League and then the Faroe Islands Cup. He also won the honour as the best football manager 2020 in the Faroe Islands, chosen by the Venjarafelag Føroya (Faroese Association of Football Managers).

In January 2021, he left Tórshavn to become new manager of struggling Danish Superliga club Horsens. In June 2023, he left AC Horsens to become the new head coach of Swedish Allsvenskan club IFK Göteborg. In June 2024, Askou left IFK Göteborg to become an assistant coach of Czech First League club Sparta Prague. As a consequence of a disappointing fall for the club, Askou was fired on 3 January 2025 by the Czech club. In January 2025, Askou was hired as an assistant coach at Danish Superliga club Copenhagen under manager Jacob Neestrup, on a deal until the end of the season.

=== Motherwell ===
On 12 June 2025, Scottish Premiership club Motherwell announced the appointment of Askou, subject to a work permit, as their new manager. In his only season in charge, he led Motherwell to a fourth-place finish in the Scottish Premiership and qualification for European competition, while receiving praise for his attacking style of football.

=== Toulouse ===
On 21 May 2026, Askou was appointed head coach of Ligue 1 club Toulouse ahead of the 2026–27 season, signing a three-year contract.

== Personal life ==
Askou is married to Rikke. The couple have three children, including current OB defender Julius.

== Managerial statistics ==
As of 21 November 2026

Managerial record by team and tenure
Team	Nat	From	To	Record								Ref
Team	Nat	From	To	G	W	D	L	GF	GA	GD	Win %	Ref
Vendsyssel	(Denmark)	8 May 2018	20 May 2019	43	13	13	17	56	58	−2	30.23	
Tórshavn	(Faroe Islands)	1 December 2019	4 January 2021	33	24	6	3	89	28	+61	72.73	
Horsens	(Denmark)	4 January 2021	7 June 2023	90	35	20	35	128	131	−3	38.89	
IFK Göteborg	(Sweden)	7 June 2023	15 June 2024	35	14	8	13	42	48	−6	40.00	
Motherwell	(Scotland)	12 June 2025	21 May 2026	47	22	14	11	71	45	+26	46.81	
Toulouse	(France)	21 May 2026	present	11	3	5	3	16	15	+1	27.27	
Total				259	111	66	82	402	325	+77	42.86	—

== Honours ==
=== Player ===
Silkeborg

- Danish 1st Division: 2003–04

Kasımpaşa

- TFF 1. League play-offs: 2008–09

Norwich City

- Football League One: 2009–10
- Football League Championship runner-up: 2010–11

=== Manager ===
Havnar Bóltfelag

- Faroe Islands Premier League: 2020
- Faroe Islands Cup: 2020

=== Individual ===
- Faroe Islands Premier League Manager of the Year: 2020
