= 2013–14 Danish Superliga =

24th season of Danish Superliga

Danish Superliga
- Season: 2013–14
- Champions: AaB
- Relegated: AGF; Viborg FF
- Champions League: AaB; F.C. Copenhagen
- Europa League: FC Midtjylland; Brøndby IF; Esbjerg fB
- Matches: 198
- Goals: 543 (2.74 per match)
- Top goalscorer: Thomas Dalgaard (18 goals)
- Biggest home win: AaB 5–0 Viborg FF
- Biggest away win: SønderjyskE 1–5 OB; FC Vestsjælland 0–4 SønderjyskE
- Highest scoring: OB 3–6 AGF
- Highest attendance: 32,846 F.C. Copenhagen 1-1; Brøndby IF
- Lowest attendance: 1,656 SønderjyskE 1-0 Esbjerg fB

The 2013–14 Danish Superliga season was the 24th season of the Danish Superliga, which decided the Danish football championship.

== Teams ==
AC Horsens and Silkeborg IF finished the 2012–13 season in 11th and 12th place, respectively, and were relegated to the 2013–14 1st Division.

The relegated teams were replaced by 2012–13 1st Division champions Viborg FF and the runners-up FC Vestsjælland.

=== Stadia and locations ===
Locations of the Danish Superliga 2013–14 teams

Club	Location	Stadium	Turf	Capacity	2012–13 position
AaB	Aalborg	Nordjyske Arena	Natural	13,797	5th
AGF	Aarhus	NRGi Park	Natural	20,032	7th
Brøndby IF	Brøndby	Brøndby Stadium	Natural	29,000	9th
Esbjerg fB	Esbjerg	Blue Water Arena	Natural	18,000	4th
F.C. Copenhagen	Copenhagen	Parken	Natural	38,065	1st
FC Midtjylland	Herning	MCH Arena	Natural	11,800	6th
FC Nordsjælland	Farum	Farum Park	Artificial	10,100	2nd
FC Vestsjælland	Slagelse	Harboe Arena Slagelse	Natural	10,000	1D, 2nd
OB	Odense	TRE-FOR Park	Natural	15,633	10th
Randers FC	Randers	AutoC Park Randers	Natural	10,300	3rd
SønderjyskE	Haderslev	Haderslev Fodboldstadion (until 7 December 2013); Sydbank Park (from 8 December 2013)	Natural	10,000	8th
Viborg FF	Viborg	Energi Viborg Arena	Natural	10,065	1D, 1st

=== Personnel and sponsoring ===
Note: Flags indicate national team as has been defined under FIFA eligibility rules. Players and Managers may hold more than one non-FIFA nationality.

Team	Head coach	Captain	Kit manufacturer	Shirt sponsor
AaB	(Denmark) Kent Nielsen	(Denmark) Thomas Augustinussen	Adidas	Spar Nord
AGF	(Denmark) Jesper Fredberg	(Denmark) Steffen Rasmussen	Hummel	YouSee
Brøndby IF	(Denmark) Thomas Frank	(Denmark) Mikkel Thygesen	Hummel	UNICEF
Esbjerg fB	(Denmark) Niels Frederiksen	(Denmark) Hans Henrik Andreasen	Nike	Sydenergi
F.C. Copenhagen	(Norway) Ståle Solbakken	(Denmark) Lars Jacobsen	Adidas	Carlsberg
FC Midtjylland	(Denmark) Glen Riddersholm	(Denmark) Kristian Bak Nielsen	Wunderelf	Nordea
FC Nordsjælland	(Denmark) Kasper Hjulmand	(Denmark) Nicolai Stokholm	Diadora	City Container
FC Vestsjælland	(Denmark) Ove Pedersen	(Denmark) Lars Pleidrup	hummel	Harboes Bryggeri
OB	(Denmark) Troels Bech	(Denmark) Anders Møller Christensen	Puma	Carlsberg
Randers FC	(England) Colin Todd	(Denmark) Christian Keller	Warrior	Verdo
SønderjyskE	(Denmark) Lars Søndergaard	(Denmark) Henrik Hansen	Diadora	Frøs Herreds Sparekasse
Viborg FF	(Lithuania) Aurelijus Skarbalius	(Denmark) Mikkel Rask	Kappa	Peter Larsen Kaffe

=== Managerial changes ===
Team	Outgoing manager	Manner of departure	Date of vacancy	Replaced by	Date of appointment	Position in table
Esbjerg fB	(Denmark) Jess Thorup	Signed by Denmark u-21	31 May 2013	(Denmark) Niels Frederiksen	1 June 2013	Pre-Season
Brøndby IF	(Lithuania) Aurelijus Skarbalius	Sacked	10 June 2013	(Denmark) Thomas Frank	10 June 2013	Pre-Season
F.C. Copenhagen	(Belgium) Ariël Jacobs	Sacked	21 August 2013	(Norway) Ståle Solbakken	21 August 2013	11th
Viborg FF	(Denmark) Ove Christensen	Resigned	31 January 2014	(Lithuania) Aurelijus Skarbalius	10 February 2014	9th
AGF	(Denmark) Peter Sørensen	Sacked	26 February 2014	(Denmark) Jesper Fredberg	27 February 2014	8th

== League table ==
Pos	Team	Pld	W	D	L	GF	GA	GD	Pts	Qualification or relegation
1	AaB (C)	33	18	8	7	60	38	+22	62	Qualification for the Champions League third qualifying round
2	Copenhagen	33	15	11	7	54	38	+16	56	Qualification for the Champions League third qualifying round
3	Midtjylland	33	16	7	10	61	38	+23	55	Qualification for the Europa League play-off round
4	Brøndby	33	13	13	7	47	38	+9	52	Qualification for the Europa League third qualifying round
5	Esbjerg fB	33	13	9	11	47	38	+9	48	Qualification for the Europa League second qualifying round
6	Nordsjælland	33	13	7	13	38	44	−6	46	
7	Randers FC	33	9	14	10	41	45	−4	41	
8	OB	33	10	10	13	47	46	+1	40	
9	Vestsjælland	33	8	14	11	31	42	−11	38	
10	SønderjyskE	33	10	8	15	41	53	−12	38	
11	AGF (R)	33	9	5	19	38	60	−22	32	Relegation to Danish 1st Division
12	Viborg FF (R)	33	6	10	17	38	63	−25	28	Relegation to Danish 1st Division

Source: Danish Football Association (in Danish)
Rules for classification: 1) points; 2) goal difference; 3) number of goals scored.
(C) Champions; (R) Relegated

== Positions by round ==
Team ╲ Round	1	2	3	4	5	6	7	8	9	10	11	12	13	14	15	16	17	18	19	20	21	22	23	24	25	26	27	28	29	30	31	32	33
AaB	3	2	3	3	5	7	3	2	3	4	2	2	2	2	2	2	2	2	2	2	2	2	2	2	1	1	1	1	1	2	1	1	1
Copenhagen	10	12	12	12	11	11	10	10	9	11	8	7	7	4	3	3	3	3	3	3	3	3	3	3	3	3	3	3	3	3	3	3	2
Midtjylland	2	1	1	1	1	1	1	1	1	1	1	1	1	1	1	1	1	1	1	1	1	1	1	1	2	2	2	2	2	1	2	2	3
Brøndby	6	9	10	10	12	12	12	11	11	7	9	10	10	8	4	4	4	4	4	4	4	4	4	4	4	4	4	4	4	4	4	4	4
Esbjerg fB	1	4	2	2	2	4	4	6	2	2	3	3	6	9	8	11	11	11	10	7	5	5	5	5	5	5	5	5	5	5	5	5	5
Nordsjælland	12	11	11	11	10	10	11	12	12	12	12	11	11	11	11	10	10	6	5	5	6	8	7	6	6	7	6	7	6	6	6	6	6
Randers FC	4	6	6	6	3	6	8	8	7	8	10	9	9	7	10	9	9	5	7	9	9	10	9	8	8	8	8	6	7	8	8	8	7
OB	6	8	5	4	4	2	5	7	10	9	6	4	4	6	9	8	5	7	6	8	8	7	6	7	7	6	7	8	8	7	7	7	8
Vestsjælland	6	10	8	8	8	8	6	3	5	6	7	6	8	10	7	6	8	10	11	11	10	9	11	10	10	9	9	9	9	9	9	9	9
SønderjyskE	6	3	7	7	9	9	9	9	8	10	11	12	12	12	12	12	12	12	12	12	12	12	12	12	12	12	12	11	11	10	10	10	10
AGF	11	5	4	5	6	3	2	4	6	5	5	8	5	3	5	5	6	8	8	6	7	6	8	9	9	10	10	10	12	12	12	12	11
Viborg FF	4	6	9	9	7	5	7	5	4	3	4	5	3	5	6	7	7	9	9	10	11	11	10	11	11	11	11	12	10	11	11	11	12

Source: superliga.dk

== Results ==
=== Matchday 1–11 ===
Home \ Away	AaB	AGF	BIF	EfB	FCK	FCM	FCN	FCV	OB	RFC	SJE	VFF
AaB		0–0	2–1		2–1	1–1			0–0			3–1
AGF			1–3			0–2	2–1				3–1	0–1
Brøndby				0–2	3–2			1–1	2–1	0–0		
Esbjerg fB	1–2	5–1				1–1	4–0		1–3		4–1	
Copenhagen		1–1		1–1				1–1	2–1	1–3	2–1	
Midtjylland			5–2		1–0		2–1	2–2			2–1	0–0
Nordsjælland	2–1		1–1		2–2			1–2		1–0		1–1
Vestsjælland	2–1	0–2		1–3					1–1	2–0		
OB		3–6				1–1	1–0				1–1	4–2
Randers FC	3–2	2–2		3–2		1–3			1–1		0–2	
SønderjyskE	1–3		1–0				2–0	0–0				0–3
Viborg FF			2–2	3–1	1–4			2–0		2–2		

Source: Danish Football Association (in Danish)
Legend: Blue = home team win; Yellow = draw; Red = away team win.

=== Matchday 12–33 ===
Home \ Away	AaB	AGF	BIF	EfB	FCK	FCM	FCN	FCV	OB	RFC	SJE	VFF
AaB		1–0	2–0	0–2	2–1	1–0	1–1	0–0	1–0	1–2	2–0	5–0
AGF	2–5		1–2	0–3	1–1	0–4	0–1	2–2	0–1	0–1	0–3	2–1
Brøndby	2–2	3–0		1–0	1–3	3–1	4–1	2–2	1–2	1–1	3–1	0–0
Esbjerg fB	2–2	0–2	0–0		1–1	0–0	2–1	0–0	1–0	0–3 (Note: Match originally finished 2–2, but on 17 May Esbjerg was found to have used Ryan Laursen who was suspended for the match.)	2–1	0–0
Copenhagen	3–0	1–0	1–1	2–2		1–5	4–0	1–0	3–2	1–1	2–0	4–1
Midtjylland	2–3	3–0	0–1	3–0	2–3		0–1	3–1	0–2	1–1	2–0	5–2
Nordsjælland	2–4	1–0	2–2	0–1	1–0	2–1		1–2	2–0	1–1	3–0	2–0
Vestsjælland	0–0	2–1	0–2	2–1	0–1	0–1	0–0		1–0	1–1	0–4	0–1
OB	2–3	4–1	0–0	1–2	0–1	2–1	0–1	1–3		2–1	2–2	1–1
Randers FC	1–4	1–3	0–1	1–0	1–1	0–3	0–1	1–1	1–1		1–1	3–1
SønderjyskE	3–2	1–2	1–1	1–0	0–0	3–1	3–1	1–1	1–5	1–3		1–0
Viborg FF	0–2	0–3 (Note: Match originally finished 3–0, but on 17 May Viborg was found to have used David Boysen who was suspended for the match.)	0–1	1–3	0–2	2–3	1–3	4–1	2–2	1–1	2–2	

Source: Danish Football Association (in Danish)
Legend: Blue = home team win; Yellow = draw; Red = away team win.

== Top scorers ==
Rank	Player	Team	Goals
1	(Denmark) Thomas Dalgaard	Viborg FF	18
2	(Denmark) Ronnie Schwartz	Randers FC	15
2	(Denmark) Morten Rasmussen	FC Midtjylland	15
4	(Belgium) Igor Vetokele	F.C. Copenhagen	13
5	(Denmark) Simon Makienok	Brøndby IF	12
5	(Denmark) Kasper Kusk	AaB	12
7	(Austria) Rubin Okotie	SønderjyskE	11
8	(Nigeria) Sylvester Igboun	FC Midtjylland	10
9	(Norway) Mustafa Abdellaoue	OB	9
9	(Denmark) Jakob Ankersen	Esbjerg fB	9

== Attendances ==
No.	Club	Average	Highest
1	Brøndby IF	15,931	21,798
2	FC København	15,720	32,486
3	AaB	8,475	13,934
4	AGF	8,131	14,488
5	FC Midtjylland	8,061	11,535
6	OB	7,819	11,524
7	Esbjerg fB	7,667	11,417
8	Viborg FF	5,616	9,047
9	FC Nordsjælland	5,172	9,726
10	Randers FC	5,171	7,025
11	FC Vestsjælland	3,735	5,285
12	SønderjyskE	3,481	8,357
