= Jonas Dal =

Danish footballer and manager (born 1976)

Personal information
- Full name: Jonas Dal Andersen
- Date of birth: 7 July 1976 (age 50)
- Place of birth: Ikast, Denmark
- Position: Defender

Team information
- Current team: Ebedei (sporting director)

Youth career
- Ikast fS

Senior career*
Years	Team	Apps	(Gls)
1994–1999	Ikast fS		
1999–2000	Midtjylland		
2000–2001	Þór Akureyri		
2001–2002	Skive		

Managerial career
- 2003–2012: Ikast fS (Midtjylland reserves)
- 2013–2015: Hobro
- 2015–2016: Esbjerg
- 2017–2018: Kjellerup
- 2018–2020: Fredericia
- 2020: Horsens
- 2021: HB Tórshavn
- 2021–2022: AB Argir (sporting director)
- 2022–: Ebedei (sporting director)
- * Club domestic league appearances and goals

Jonas Dal Andersen (born 7 July 1976) is a Danish former professional footballer and current sporting director of Ebedei.

== Coaching career ==
In January 2013, Dal was named new manager of Hobro IK replacing Klavs Rasmussen, who had resigned a few days earlier. In his first season he led the club to a 9th place in the Danish 1st Division, but in the following season he secured the club's first ever promotion to the Danish Superliga.

In 2018 he joined FC Fredericia in the Danish 1st Division. In August 2020 he was signed by AC Horsens as replacement for Bo Henriksen. Due to a poor start to the 2020–21 season Dal was sacked on 8 December 2020.

In January 2021 he became manager of Faroese club HB Tórshavn. On 28 June 2021, Dal stepped back from his position at the club. On 6 August 2021, Dal was appointed sporting director of AB Argir.

In June 2022, Dal was hired as new sporting director of Nigerian club F.C. Ebedei.
