= Klebér Saarenpää =

Swedish footballer and manager (born 1975)

Personal information
- Full name: John Klebér Saarenpää
- Date of birth: 14 December 1975 (age 50)
- Place of birth: Uppsala, Sweden
- Height: 1.79 m (5 ft 10 in)
- Position: Defender

Youth career
- 1981–: Stäppens IF
- –1991: Uppsala-Näs IK
- 1991–1992: IK Sirius

Senior career*
Years	Team	Apps	(Gls)
1992–1994	IK Sirius	46	(2)
1995–1996	Djurgårdens IF	34	(1)
1997–2000	IFK Norrköping	88	(4)
2001–2004	AaB	31	(1)
2005	IK Sirius	5	(0)
2005–2006	Hammarby IF	6	(0)
2007	Vejle Boldklub	10	(2)
2007–2008	Hammarby IF	13	(0)
Total		233	(10)

International career
1991–1992	Sweden U17	9	(0)
1993–1994	Sweden U19	10	(0)
1995–1998	Sweden U21	11	(0)
2000–2001	Sweden	11	(0)

Managerial career
- 2009–2010: Hammarby IF (youth)
- 2011: Hammarby Talang FF
- 2012–2013: Syrianska
- 2014: Vejle BK (assistant manager)
- 2014–2016: Vejle BK
- 2016: Syrianska
- 2017: Hammarby IF (U19 manager)
- 2018–2023: IK Brage
- 2024–2025: Helsingborgs IF
- * Club domestic league appearances and goals

John Klebér Saarenpää (born 14 December 1975) is a Swedish football manager and former player who was most recently in charge of Superettan club Helsingborgs IF. A defender, he played for IK Sirius, Djurgårdens IF, IFK Norrköping, AaB, Hammarby IF, and Vejle during a career that spanned between 1992 and 2008. A full international between 2000 and 2001, he won 11 caps for the Sweden national team.

== Club career ==
Saarenpää was born in Uppsala to a Guinean mother and a Finnish father, and he started his career in local team Stäppens IF.

Saarenpää represented Djurgårdens IF, IFK Norrköping, Hammarby IF and AaB (in Denmark). He made a contract with the Danish club Vejle Boldklub from 1 January 2007. On 10 March 2007, he debuted as captain for Vejle Boldklub and scored two goals. His contract with Vejle Boldklub only ran until 30 June 2007 and Saarenpää has therefore played his last match for the club. After that he returned to his old club Hammarby IF and signed a two-year contract with the Stockholm based club. He ended his career after the 2008 season.

== International career ==
Internationally, Saarenpää represented the Sweden U17, U19, and U21 teams a total of 30 times before making his full international debut for the Sweden national team on 31 January 2000 in a friendly game against Denmark. He made his competitive debut for Sweden in a 2002 FIFA World Cup qualifier against Slovakia, in which he played in all 90 minutes as Sweden won 2–0. He appeared in four more qualifying games for the 2002 FIFA World Cup, but missed the final tournament because of an injury. He won a total of 11 caps between 2000 and 2001.

== Coaching career ==
In January 2014 Saarenpää signed a 2.5-year contract with Vejle Boldklub as an Assistant Manager. In October of the same year he was promoted to Manager of Vejle Boldklub after the former Manager Tonny Hermansen withdrew from the position. He was sacked on 23 April 2016.

== Personal life ==
Saarenpää also has Finnish citizenship.

== Career statistics ==
=== International ===
Appearances and goals by national team and year
National team	Year	Apps	Goals
Sweden	2000	2	0
Sweden	2001	9	0
Total		11	0

== Managerial statistics ==
As of match played 12 January 2024

Managerial record by team and tenure
Team	Nat	From	To	Record							
Team	Nat	From	To	G	W	D	L	GF	GA	GD	Win %
Syrianska	(Sweden)	21 March 2012	31 December 2013	65	15	12	38	72	114	−42	23.08
Vejle BK	(Denmark)	20 October 2014	24 April 2016	50	22	12	16	78	65	+13	44.00
Syrianska	(Sweden)	1 August 2016	31 December 2016	16	7	5	4	23	19	+4	43.75
IK Brage	(Sweden)	1 January 2018	11 November 2023	203	83	47	73	310	279	+31	40.89
Helsingborgs IF	(Sweden)	1 January 2024	Present	0	0	0	0	0	0	+0	—
Total				334	127	76	131	483	477	+6	38.02
