= Klavs Rasmussen =

Danish football manager (born 1966)

Personal information
- Date of birth: 23 June 1966 (age 60)

Managerial career
- Years: Team
- 1982–2001: KB (youth)
- 2002–2004: Odense Boldklub (assistant)
- 2004–2005: Odense Boldklub
- 2006: BK Avarta
- 2006–2007: Ølstykke FC
- 2009–2010: Brøndby IF (women)
- 2011–2012: Næstved Boldklub
- 2012–2013: Hobro IK
- 2013–2014: F.C. Copenhagen (youth)
- 2016–2018: West African Football Academy

Klavs Rasmussen (born 23 June 1966) is a Danish football manager most recently in charge of Ghanaian football club West African Football Academy.

Rasmussen had worked as a youth coach at KB for 20 years, when he became assistant manager at Odense Boldklub in January 2002. In January 2004, he became joint manager of the club together with Troels Bech. They were both sacked in June 2005.

He later managed BK Avarta, Ølstykke FC, the women’s team of Brøndby IF, and Næstved Boldklub.

On 28 June 2012, he was named new manager of Hobro IK. He resigned on 17 January 2013.

In November 2016, he was announced as the new head coach of the Ghanaian football club West African Football Academy. He resigned on 20 April 2018, following a string of four defeats.
