= Mikkel Rask =

Danish footballer (born 1983)

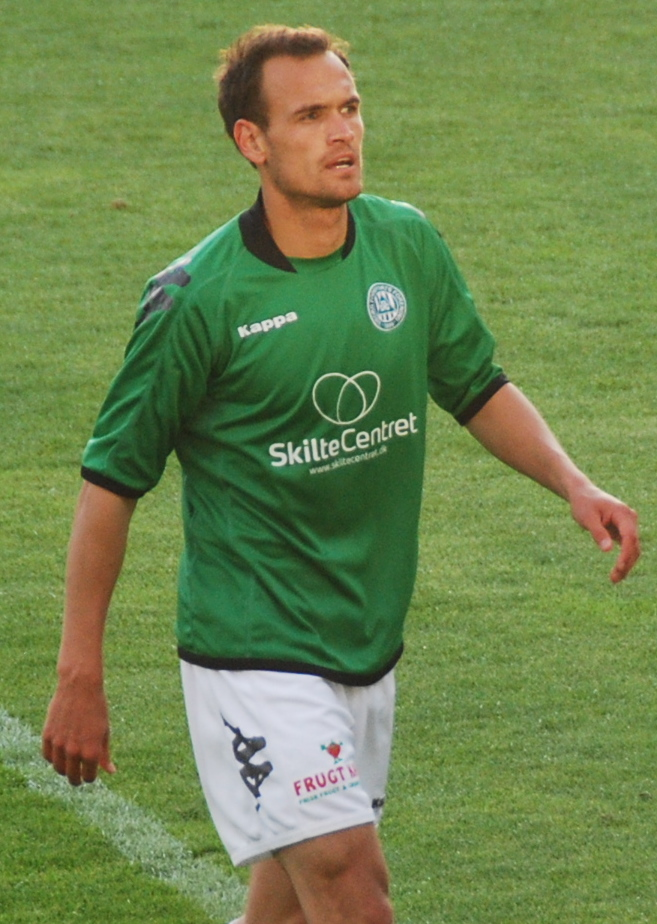
- Mikkel Rask in 2011.

Personal information
- Full name: Mikkel Vanger Rask Larsen
- Date of birth: 22 June 1983 (age 43)
- Place of birth: Randers, Denmark
- Height: 1.85 m (6 ft 1 in)
- Position: Defender

Senior career*
Years	Team	Apps	(Gls)
2001–2005	Randers	79	(11)
2005–2009	Viborg	88	(6)
2009–2010	Diyarbakırspor	5	(0)
2010	Fredericia	10	(2)
2010–2011	Hjørring	9	(4)
2011–2016	Viborg	94	(6)
2017–2018	AGF	9	(1)

International career
2003–2004	Denmark U20	3	(0)
- * Club domestic league appearances and goals

Mikkel Rask (born 22 June 1983) is a Danish former professional footballer who played as a defender.

== Club career ==
Mikkel Rask got his breakthrough in the Danish 1st Division in 2001 while playing for Randers FC. When the club was promoted to the Danish Superliga in 2004 but suffered relegation in the same season, Rask moved to Viborg FF to remain in the Superliga. In total, he played 91 top-flight matches and scored 10 goals for Randers FC and Viborg FF before Viborg was relegated in 2008.

In 2009, Rask signed with Turkish Süper Lig side Diyarbakırspor, which initially appeared to be a promising move. However, due to the club's financial difficulties, he left in January 2010 and returned to Denmark.

On 1 January 2017, he joined AGF on a contract that ran until the summer of 2018.

== Honours ==
Viborg

- Danish 1st Division: 2012–13, 2014–15
