= Søren Hermansen =

Danish footballer and coach (born 1970)

Personal information
- Full name: Søren Hermansen
- Date of birth: 7 September 1970 (age 56)
- Place of birth: Aarhus, Denmark
- Height: 1.75 m (5 ft 9 in)
- Position: Forward

Team information
- Current team: Denmark U16 (head coach)

Youth career
- Skovbakken
- AGF
- Aarhus Fremad

Senior career*
Years	Team	Apps	(Gls)
1990–1998	Aarhus Fremad	63	(44)
1998–2000	Lyngby	53	(27)
2000–2003	Mechelen	24	(7)
2003–2005	Þróttur	34	(17)

Managerial career
- 2005–2008: Vanløse (assistant)
- 2008–2009: Skovlunde
- 2009–2011: Frem U17
- 2011–2017: Lyngby U17
- 2015: Lyngby (caretaker)
- 2017–2018: Denmark U18
- 2017–2018: Denmark U16
- 2018–2019: Denmark U17
- 2019–: Denmark U16
- * Club domestic league appearances and goals

Søren Hermansen (born 7 September 1970) is a Danish professional football coach and former player who played as a forward. He is manager of the Denmark national under-16 team.

== Playing career ==
During his active career, he started as a youth player for hometown clubs Skovbakken and AGF before helping Aarhus Fremad reach promotion to the Danish Superliga. In 1998, he signed with Lyngby Boldklub before moving to Mechelen in Belgium. After three tumultuous seasons there where he was demoted to the reserves and did not receive months worth of pay, he ended his career in Iceland with Þróttur where he played for two years. He scored 75 goals in all Danish divisions during his tenures for Fremad and Lyngby.

== Coaching career ==
After his active playing career, Hermansen started coaching local Copenhagen-clubs Vanløse and Skovlunde, before becoming a renowned youth manager, having coached Lyngby U17 as well as various national youth teams.
