= Rasmus Ingemann =

Danish footballer (born 1983)

Personal information
- Full name: Rasmus Ingemann
- Date of birth: 4 April 1983 (age 43)
- Place of birth: Aarhus, Denmark
- Height: 1.80 m (5 ft 11 in)
- Positions: Left-back; defensive midfielder

Youth career
- Viborg FF
- NUGF Viborg

Senior career*
Years	Team	Apps	(Gls)
2004–2016	Hobro IK	282	(13)
2016–2017	Brabrand IF	28	(6)
2017	Hobro IK II	4	(0)
- * Club domestic league appearances and goals

Rasmus Ingemann (born 4 April 1983) is a Danish retired footballer and current Commercial Manager of Viborg FF.

== Career ==
=== Club career ===
Ingemann was one of the players who helped Hobro with promotion from the Denmark Series (fourth tier) to the Danish Superliga. In December 2012 it was confirmed that Ingemann had signed a new one-year deal and beside his playing duties, he was also going to Sponsor Coordinator for the club on full-time. Beside his playing career, Ingemann studied to civiløkonom and had a master's degree in business performance. Having played 286 games for Hobro IK, it was announced on 5 December 2015, that Ingemann would leave Hobro at the end of the season to play on a lower level but he would still continue as a sponsor coordinator for the club.

=== Later career ===
On 1 February 2016 it was confirmed, that Ingemann had signed with lower Danish side Brabrand IF but would still be sponsor coordinator for Hobro. At the end of 2016, Ingemann was promoted to sales manager at Hobro IK. Ingemann played 28 games in the Danish 2nd Division for Brabrand, before he decided to retire in the summer 2017 so he could spend more time with his duties at Hobro. After leaving Brabrand, Ingemann also played four games for Hobro's reserve team.

He left the sales manager position at Hobro on 1 April 2018 to take on a new challenge with Viborg FF as the club's Commercial Manager. In the role of commercial manager, Rasmus Ingeman was given responsibility for the commercial development of Viborg FF, and would also have responsibility for the partner circle, which counted about 300 companies.
