= Henrik Lehm =

Danish football manager

Personal information
- Date of birth: 23 August 1960 (age 66)
- Place of birth: Ubberud, Denmark

Managerial career
- Years: Team
- 1989–1992: AC Horsens women
- 1993–1995: OB women
- 1997–1999: Aarslev Boldklub
- 2000–2002: Svendborg fB (youth)
- 2002–2004: Denmark U17 women
- 2004–2008: Denmark U19 women
- 2008–2011: Næsby BK
- 2012: Vendsyssel FF
- 2012–2013: AB
- 2014: Brøndby (U19)
- 2016–2018: HB Køge
- 2018–2020: Næsby BK (U19)
- 2020–2021: Inter Allies
- 2021–2022: MSV Duisburg women
- 2022–: Odense KS (coach)

Henrik Lehm (born 23 August 1960) is a Danish professional football manager.

== Coaching career ==
Lehm started coaching at AC Horsens as women's team coach in 1989 and managed different Danish club and also worked as the youth coach and academy director. He was the manager of Denmark U17 and U19 women team from 2002 to 2008. After the national team coaching he returnts to club football in 2008 with Næsby BK. In 2012 he joined Danish club Akademisk Boldklub and he was with them until 2013. From 2013 to 2016 he worked as the youth team director of the Brøndby IF. In January 2016 he appointed as the head coach of HB Køge. He left the club in 2018, only to return to Næsby as head of development.

In January 2020 he was appointed as the Ghana Premier League Club Inter Allies manager, and with them he achieved Ghana premier league coach of the month award in February. His stay in Ghana was interrupted by the COVID-19 pandemic.

In June 2021 he was named new manager of the women's team of MSV Duisburg. He departed MSV Duisburg in March 2022. Later in 2022 he became a coach in Odense Kammeraternes Sportsklub.
