= Frank Hansen (footballer, born 1983) =

Danish footballer

Personal information
- Date of birth: 23 February 1983 (age 43)
- Place of birth: Jyllinge, Denmark
- Height: 1.75 m (5 ft 9 in)
- Position: Defender

Senior career*
Years	Team	Apps	(Gls)
1999–2003	Ølstykke FC	95	(1)
2004–2009	Esbjerg fB	125	(3)
2009–2016	Silkeborg IF	187	(6)

International career
1999	Denmark U-16	7	(0)
1999–2000	Denmark U-17	18	(1)
2000–2002	Denmark U-19	18	(1)
2002–2004	Denmark U-20	4	(0)
2002–2006	Denmark U-21	9	(0)
- * Club domestic league appearances and goals as of 17 February 2015

Frank Hansen (born 23 February 1983) is a Danish retired football defender.

On 9 May 2006 he was selected for the Danish squad for UEFA U-21 Championship 2006.

Hansen was signed on a free transfer by Silkeborg IF in the summer of 2009.
