= Mathias Tauber =

Danish footballer (born 1984)

Personal information
- Full name: Mathias Dyring Tauber
- Date of birth: 24 August 1984 (age 42)
- Place of birth: Birkerød, Denmark
- Height: 1.86 m (6 ft 1 in)
- Position: Centre-back

Team information
- Current team: Ølstykke (youth development coach)

Senior career*
Years	Team	Apps	(Gls)
2001–2002	AB	0	(0)
2002–2005	Ølstykke	17	(0)
2005–2006	Stenløse	18	(2)
2006–2007	Næstved	25	(1)
2007–2010	AB	85	(3)
2010–2018	Lyngby	176	(9)
2018–2019	Nykøbing	26	(1)

Managerial career
- 2024–2025: Ølstykke (U15 & U17 assistant)
- 2025–: Ølstykke (youth development coach)
- * Club domestic league appearances and goals

Mathias Dyring Tauber (born 24 August 1984) is a Danish former professional footballer. He mainly played as a central defender.

After having played numerous seasons in the lower divisions of Danish football, Tauber made his debut in the Danish Superliga in 2010, after signing with Lyngby Boldklub. He totalled 176 league matches for the club, captaining the side between 2012 and 2018. A dispute with head coach Mark Strudal saw him leave the club for Nykøbing FC in 2018, where he ended his active career.

== Club career ==
Tauber played his first years as a senior for AB. Between 2002 and 2005, he played for Ølstykke FC. In the summer of 2005 he joined Stenløse BK, where he played 18 matches. In the 2006–07 season, he played for Næstved BK who had just been promoted to the Danish second tier.

=== AB ===
On 5 July 2007, Tauber returned to his former club AB, who had the ambition of returning to the Danish Superliga within three years. He signed a two-year deal with the club. In November 2008, half a year before the expiration of the original contract, Tauber signed a new contract with AB, keeping him in the club until the summer of 2011. At this time, AB were in fourth place in the Danish second tier and had the second-best defense. AB ended the season in the third spot with Silkeborg IF and Herfølge Boldklub securing promotion, seven points ahead.

In the 2009–10 season, which would end up being Tauber's last for AB, the club ended in fourth place.

=== Lyngby Boldklub ===
After a longer period where Lyngby Boldklub had followed Tauber, he signed with the De kongeblå in August 2010. At this time, Lyngby were newly promoted to the Danish Superliga, and for Tauber it meant a debut in the first tier of Danish football. He signed a two-year deal with Lyngby.

On 26 August 2010, Tauber made his debut for Lyngby in an away match against F.C. Copenhagen, substituting Kim Aabech during half-time. In his first season for Lyngby, Tauber played 27 matches, 22 of the for 90 minutes. Lyngby ended the season in the 8th spot.

In the next season Tauber played the first four matches before getting injured, meaning that he would miss the next seven games. Before the injury, he had scored his first two goals for Lyngby in a 3–1 home league win over HB Køge. On 23 January 2012, Tauber signed a contract extension with Lyngby, keeping him in the club until the summer of 2015. Around a month later, Tauber was made club captain by Lyngby manager Niels Frederiksen.

On 9 July 2018, a few minutes before the friendly match against FC Roskilde, new manager Mark Strudal announced that he had been stripped from his role as captain, actively making Martin Ørnskov the new Lyngby captain. Tauber had not been notified of the demotion before a common team meeting, resulting in his dissatisfaction. Because of this, he had no interest in becoming vice-captain. Afterwards, he got an ultimatum: either he could become a vice-captain or he could no longer be a part of Lyngby Boldklub. This finally led to Tauber rescinding his contract with the club on 20 July 2018, six months before his deal expired.

=== Nykøbing FC ===
On 13 August 2018, Tauber signed with Danish second-tier club Nykøbing FC.

On 10 May 2019 it was confirmed, that Tauber would retire at the end of the season.
