= Søren Pallesen =

Danish footballer

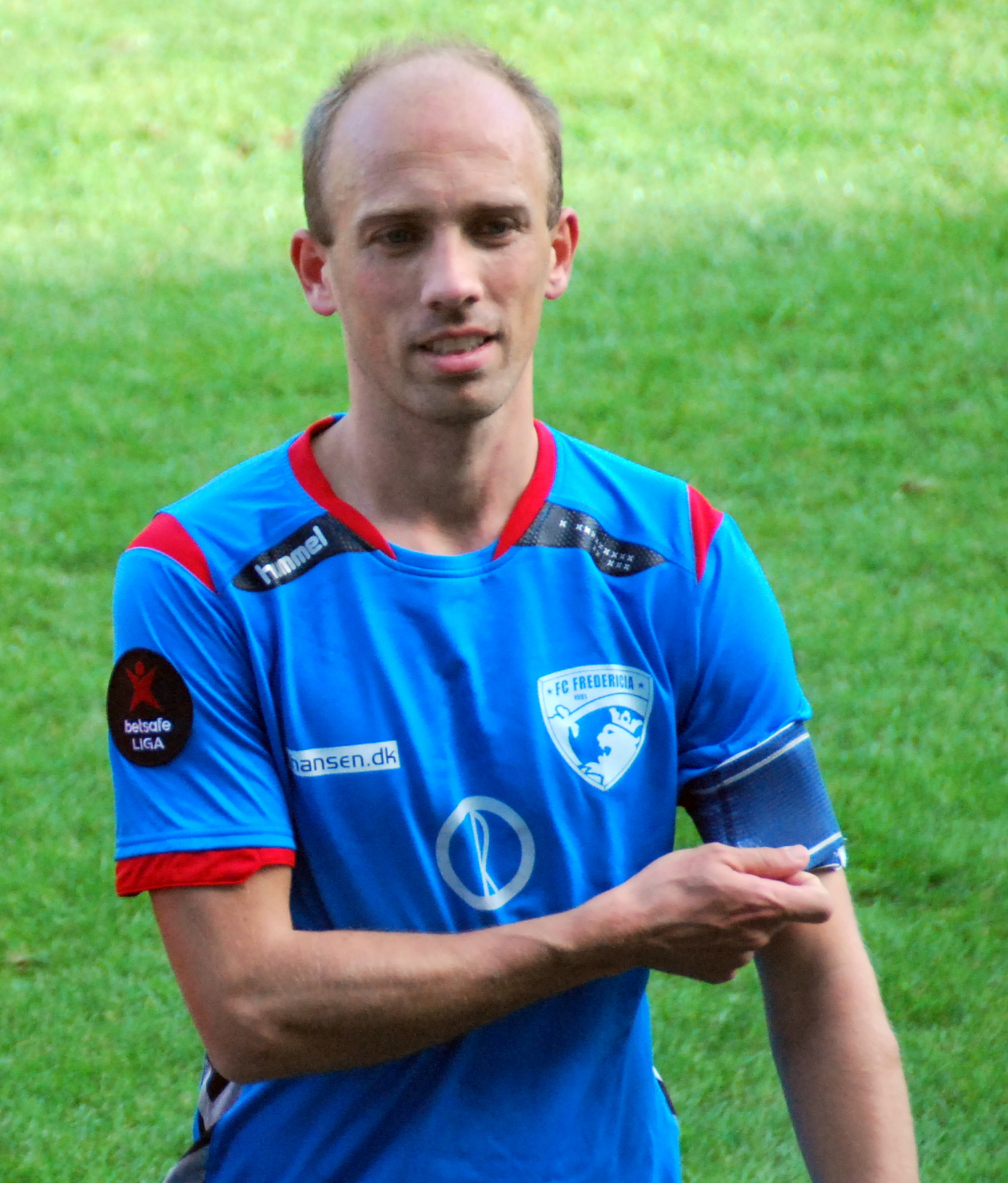

Personal information
- Full name: Søren Hedegaard Pallesen
- Date of birth: 7 October 1977 (age 49)
- Place of birth: Esbjerg, Denmark
- Height: 1.79 m (5 ft 10 in)
- Position: Midfielder

Team information
- Current team: Varde IF (head coach)
- Number: 15

Youth career
- Næsbjerg IF
- Esbjerg fB

Senior career*
Years	Team	Apps	(Gls)
1995–2003	Esbjerg fB	174	(10)
2003–2006	Fredericia	87	(13)
2006–2009	Vejle Boldklub	73	(3)
2009–2013	Fredericia	85	(5)
2013	Varde IF		

International career
1993	Denmark U16	2	(0)
1993	Denmark U17	2	(0)
1995	Denmark U19	2	(0)

Managerial career
- 2013–2014: Varde IF (playing assistant)
- 2014–: Varde IF
- * Club domestic league appearances and goals

Søren Pallesen (born 7 October 1977) is a Danish former professional footballer and current head coach, who is the current head coach of fourth-tier Denmark Series club Varde IF.
