= Søren Kusk =

Danish footballer and manager (born 1960)

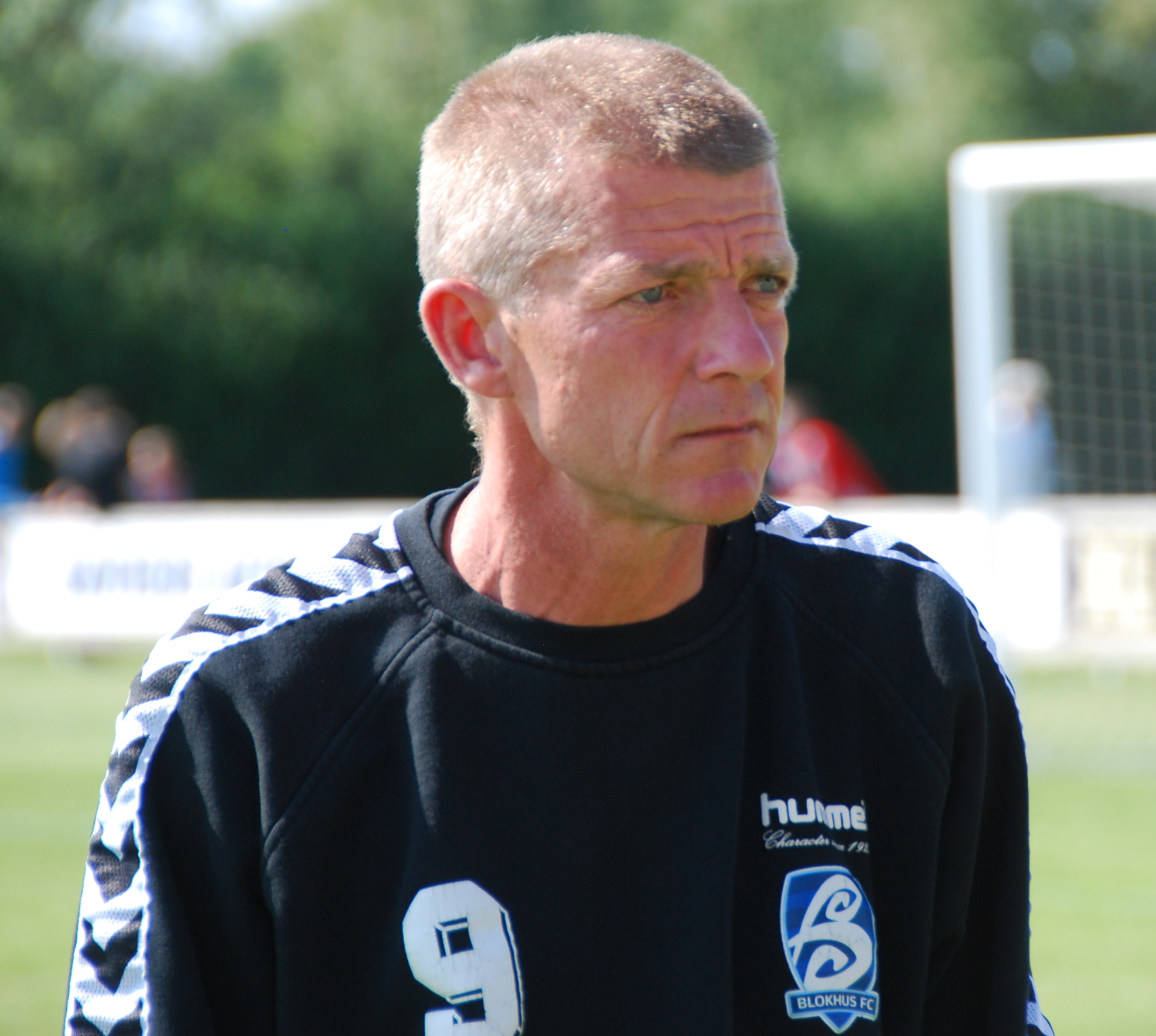
- Kusk in 2011

Personal information
- Full name: Søren Kusk Larsen
- Date of birth: 6 April 1960 (age 66)
- Place of birth: Thisted, Denmark

Senior career*
Years	Team	Apps	(Gls)
	Thisted FC	25	
	AaB	119	(3)

Managerial career
- 1985–1990: AaB (youth)
- 1990–1994: AaB (assistant)
- 1994–1997: Aalborg Chang
- 1998–2000: Randers Freja
- 2001–2003: Viborg FF
- 2003: AaB
- 2004–2005: SønderjyskE
- 2007–2008: Hobro
- 2008: AaB (youth)
- 2008–2010: Hobro
- 2010–2012: Blokhus
- 2012–2014: FC Hjørring
- * Club domestic league appearances and goals

Søren Kusk Larsen (born 6 April 1960) is a Danish politician, professional football manager and former player. He represents the Social Democrats in the Aalborg Municipality city council.

== Football career ==
Kusk played football for AaB, where he made more than 150 first team appearances.

His coaching career started with a number of smaller coaching jobs at AaB, both as an assistant and in the youth department, before becoming head coach of Aalborg Chang in 1994. Afterwards, he also coached Viborg FF and AaB.

In 2005, he won promotion with SønderjyskE to the Danish Superliga, but stepped down from his position coach after being arrested for driving under the influence of alcohol.

In January 2008, he was hired as a talent coordinator for AaB, but stopped, after mutual agreement with AaB, due to alcoholism which prevented him from carrying out his job.

== Political career ==
In 2017, he was elected to the Aalborg Municipality council as a Social Democrat.
