= Vejle Boldklub Kolding =

Danish football club

Vejle Kolding
- Full name: Vejle Boldklub Kolding
- Short name: Vejle Kolding; VB Kolding
- Founded: 2011 (merger)
- Dissolved: 2013
- Ground: Vejle Stadion, Vejle
- Capacity: 10,500
- League: Danish 1st Division
- 2011–12: Danish 1st Division, 3rd
Home colours	Away colours

Vejle Boldklub Kolding (Vejle Kolding or VB Kolding) was a short lived professional Danish football club. The club played two seasons in the Danish 1st Division before being dissolved in 2013.

The club was founded in June 2011, when Vejle Boldklub and Kolding FC merged.

The club was dissolved in June 2013 and split into Vejle Boldklub and Kolding IF.
