= Ove Pedersen =

Danish football manager and former player

Personal information
- Date of birth: 30 August 1954 (age 72)
- Place of birth: Hammer, Denmark
- Position: Defender

Team information
- Current team: Midtjylland (sporting director)

Senior career*
Years	Team	Apps	(Gls)
1980–1981	Ikast fS		
1982–1986	Herning Fremad		

Managerial career
- 1987: Viborg FF (reserves)
- 1988–1990: Vildbjerg SF
- 1991–1995: Herning Fremad
- 1996–1997: Qatar U-17
- 1997–1999: Herning Fremad
- 1999–2002: Midtjylland
- 2002–2005: Esbjerg fB
- 2006–2008: AGF
- 2009–2011: Esbjerg fB
- 2011–2014: Vestsjælland
- 2014–2015: OB
- 2015: Fredericia
- 2015–2016: Hobro
- 2017–: Midtjylland (assistant sporting director)
- * Club domestic league appearances and goals

Ove Pedersen (born 30 August 1954) is a Danish football manager and a former player. He works as an assistant to the sporting director in FC Midtjylland, Svend Graversen.

He previously managed FC Midtjylland and Esbjerg fB to bronze medals in the Danish Superliga. He was the manager of Danish club AGF until 31 December, on 1 January 2009 he returned as manager at Esbjerg fB, but resigned on 14 March 2011. From 2011 to 2014 he was the manager of FC Vestsjælland. Ove Pedersen was sacked as manager of Hobro IK in November 2016, as the club was leading the Danish 1st Division.
