= 2014–15 Viborg FF season =

Danish football club season

Viborg FF are a Danish football club which are based in Viborg, Denmark. During the 2014/15 campaign they competed in the Danish 1st Division and DBU Pokalen. They are currently under the management of Aurelijus Skarbalius.

== Competitions ==
Pos	Team	Pld	W	D	L	GF	GA	GD	Pts	Promotion or Relegation
1	Viborg FF (P)	33	17	14	2	47	20	+27	65	Promotion to Danish Superliga
2	AGF (P)	33	17	10	6	59	33	+26	61	Promotion to Danish Superliga
3	Lyngby Boldklub	33	14	9	10	49	37	+12	51	
4	Vendsyssel FF	33	13	10	10	35	29	+6	49	
5	Vejle BK	33	11	12	10	41	46	−5	45	
6	AC Horsens	33	10	12	11	43	42	+1	42	
7	HB Køge	33	10	12	11	33	35	−2	42	
8	Skive IK	33	8	17	8	40	42	−2	41	
9	FC Roskilde	33	10	8	15	40	38	+2	38	
10	FC Fredericia	33	6	16	11	28	40	−12	34	
11	AB Gladsaxe (R)	33	8	8	17	35	61	−26	32	Relegation to Danish 2nd Divisions
12	Brønshøj Boldklub (R)	33	3	14	16	20	47	−27	23	Relegation to Danish 2nd Divisions

Source: DBU
Rules for classification: 1) points; 2) goal difference; 3) number of goals scored
(P) Promoted; (R) Relegated

== Danish 1st Division ==
27 July 2014 Match 1	Viborg FF	1 - 1	AC Horsens	Viborg, Denmark
15:00	Lukas Lerager (yellow card) 49'; Stankov 64'	Report	Troels Kløve 90+2'	Stadium: Viborg Stadion; Attendance: 3,073

3 August 2014 Match 2	HB Køge	2 - 3	Viborg FF	Herfølge
15:00	Bruninho 38'; Sylvester Seeger-Hansen 59'	Summary	Mensah 15'; Lukas Lerager 63'; Poulsen 70'	Stadium: SEAS-NVE Park; Attendance: 1,384; Referee: (Denmark) Casper Thorsøe Jr

10 August 2014 Match 3	AGF	0 - 2	Viborg FF	Aarhus
15:30		Summary	Andersen 49'; Egeris (yellow card); Curth 88'	Stadium: Atletion; Attendance: 6,062; Referee: (Denmark) Chris Johansen

17 August 2014 Match 4	Viborg FF	0 - 0	Skive IK	Viborg, Denmark
15:00	Jonas Thorsen (yellow card)	Summary	Jesper Nielsen (yellow card); John Dyring (yellow card)	Stadium: Viborg Stadion; Attendance: 4,436; Referee: (Denmark) Michael Jensen

23 August 2014 Match 5	Brønshøj BK	1 - 2	Viborg FF	Brønshøj
15:00	Alexander Lazarevic 5'	Summary	Stankov 54'; Curth 62'	Stadium: Tingbjerg Ground; Attendance: 567; Referee: (Denmark) Lars Christoffersen

31 August 2014 Match 6	Viborg FF	1 - 1	FC Roskilde	Viborg, Denmark
15:00	Curth (yellow card) (goal) 58'; Déblé (yellow card)	Summary	Emil Nielsen 2'	Stadium: Viborg Stadion; Attendance: 3,142; Referee: (Denmark) Jesper Nielsen

7 September 2014 Match 7	Viborg FF	2 - 2	FC Fredericia	Viborg, Denmark
15:30	Déblé (yellow card) (goal) 14' 90+2'; Lukas Lerager (yellow card)	Summary	Nikolaj Hagelskjær (yellow card); Anders Hostrup 36'; Lasse Kronborg 44'; Christian Ege Nielsen (yellow card)	Stadium: Viborg Stadion; Attendance: 2,347; Referee: (Denmark) Benjamin Leander

12 September 2014 Match 8	AB	0 - 2	Viborg FF	Gladsaxe Municipality
19:00	Linus R. Olsson (yellow card)	Summary	Curth 21'; Rømer (yellow card); Jeff Mensah (yellow card); Stankov (yellow card); Jeppe Grønning (yellow card); Déblé 90+5'	Stadium: Gladsaxe Stadium; Attendance: 773; Referee: (Denmark) Henrik Overgaard

21 September 2014 Match 9	Viborg FF	2 - 0	Lyngby BK	Viborg, Denmark
19:00	Ogunbiyi (yellow card); Déblé 44'; Stankov (yellow card); Curth (yellow card); Stankov 82'	Summary	Sørensen (yellow card); Boysen (yellow card)	Stadium: Viborg Stadion; Attendance: 2,848; Referee: (Denmark) Chris Johansen

26 September 2014 Match 10	Vendsyssel FF	0 - 1	Viborg FF	Hjørring
19:00	Morten Bertolt (yellow card); Fagerberg (yellow card)	Summary	Rømer 37' (pen.); Egeris (yellow card); Poulsen (yellow card)	Stadium: Hjørring Stadium; Attendance: 1,234; Referee: (Denmark) Morten Krogh

6 October 2014 Match 11	Viborg FF	1 - 1	Vejle Boldklub	Viborg, Denmark
19:00	Poulsen (yellow card); Rømer (yellow card); Andersen 55'; Stankov (yellow card); Curth (yellow card)	Summary	Sivebæk (yellow card); João Duarte Pereira (yellow card); Davidsen 25'; Norouzi (yellow card); Niels Bisp Rasmussen (yellow card)	Stadium: Viborg Stadion; Attendance: 2,830; Referee: (Denmark) Henrik Overgaard

12 October 2014 Match 12	FC Roskilde	1 - 1	Viborg FF	Roskilde
16:30	Emil Nielsen 27'; Christensen (yellow card); Nikolaj Steen Hansen (yellow card)	Summary	Peter Friis Jensen (yellow card); Déblé 45'; Stankov (yellow card)	Stadium: Roskilde Idrætspark; Attendance: 948; Referee: (Denmark) Anders Poulsen

17 October 2014 Match 13	Viborg FF	2 - 0	FC Fredericia	Viborg, Denmark
19:00	Stankov (yellow card) (goal) 17'; Curth 49'; Arrieta (yellow card)	Summary	Anders Hostrup (yellow card)	Stadium: Viborg Stadion; Attendance: 2,731; Referee: (Denmark) Henning Jensen

24 October 2014 Match 14	Vendsyssel FF	1 - 0	Viborg FF	Hjørring
19:00	Morten Bertolt 90+3'	Summary	Martin Svensson (yellow card)	Stadium: Hjørring Stadium; Attendance: 829; Referee: (Denmark) Chris Johansen

2 November 2014 Match 15	Viborg FF	3 - 0	AGF	Viborg, Denmark
15:30	Rømer (yellow card) (goal) 32' (pen.); Jeppe Grønning (yellow card); Déblé 70'; Poulsen (yellow card) (goal) 83'	Summary	Andersen (red card) 32'; Skhirtladze (yellow card)	Stadium: Viborg Stadion; Attendance: 4,248; Referee: (Denmark) Morten Krogh

10 November 2014 Match 16	Viborg FF	1 - 1	AC Horsens	Viborg, Denmark
19:00	Lasse Anderson 23'; Poulsen (yellow card); Rømer (yellow card)	Summary	Bubacarr Sanneh 28'; Martin Lund (yellow card)	Stadium: Viborg Stadion; Attendance: 2,803; Referee: (Denmark) Jorgen Daugbjerg Nielsen

15 November 2014 Match 17	Vejle Boldklub	0 - 1	Viborg FF	Vejle
15:00		Summary	Martin Svensson 74'	Stadium: Vejle Stadion; Attendance: 1,306; Referee: (Denmark) Henrik Overgaard

23 November 2014 Match 18	Viborg FF	2 - 0	Brønshøj BK	Viborg, Denmark
15:00	Niklas Dannevang 24' (o.g.); Poulsen (yellow card); Andersen (yellow card); Stankov 48'; Curth (yellow card)	Summary	Niklas Dannevang (yellow card)	Stadium: Viborg Stadion; Attendance: 2,398; Referee: (Denmark) Jens Maae

12 March 2015 Match 19	Lyngby BK	0-1	Viborg FF	Kongens Lyngby
19:00	Frederik Gytkjær (yellow card); Lasse Fosgaard (yellow card); Mads Nordam (yellow card); Rasmus Minor Petersen (yellow card); Valon Ljuti (yellow card)	Summary	Déblé 15'; Poulsen (yellow card)	Stadium: Lyngby Stadion; Attendance: 2,185; Referee: (Denmark) Kasper Madsen

20 March 2015 Match 20	Viborg FF	3-0	AB	Viborg, Denmark
19:00	Hooi 42'; Déblé 50'; Egeris (yellow card) (goal) 61'; Gero (yellow card)	Summary	Thiago (yellow card); Thomas Wiil-Andersen (yellow card)	Stadium: Viborg Stadion; Attendance: 3,294; Referee: (Denmark) Sandi Putros

27 March 2015 Match 21	Skive IK	0-0	Viborg FF	Skive, Denmark
19:00	Frederik Brandhof (yellow card)	Summary		Stadium: SPARBANK Arena; Attendance: 2,103; Referee: (Denmark) Michael Tykgaard

2 April 2015 Match 22	Viborg FF	2-0	HB Køge	Viborg, Denmark
15:00	Déblé 16'; Jonas Thorsen (yellow card); Rømer 84'	Summary	Delphin Tshiembe (yellow card)	Stadium: Viborg Stadion; Attendance: 3,090; Referee: (Denmark) Chris Johansen

6 April 2015 Match 23	FC Fredericia	1-2	Viborg FF	Fredericia
14:30	Anders Hostrup 18'; Tobias Perch-Nielsen (yellow card)	Summary	Andersen 58'; Déblé (yellow card) (goal) 70'	Stadium: Monjasa Park; Attendance: 814; Referee: (Denmark) Jørgen Daugbjerg Nielsen

9 April 2015 Match 24	Viborg FF	0-0	Vendsyssel FF	Viborg, Denmark
18:30	Rømer (yellow card)	Summary	Bjarke Jacobsen (yellow card); Hansson (yellow card)	Stadium: Viborg Stadion; Attendance: 3,373; Referee: (Denmark) Dennis Mogensen

19 April 2015 Match 25	AGF	1-1	Viborg FF	Aarhus
15:30	Bjørdal (yellow card); Vatsadze 90+1'	Summary	Déblé (yellow card) (goal) 23'; Andersen (yellow card); Rømer (yellow card); Stankov (yellow card)	Stadium: Atletion; Attendance: 8,747; Referee: (Denmark) Kasper Madsen

26 April 2015 Match 26	AC Horsens	-	Viborg FF	Horsens
15:00				Stadium: CASA Arena Horsens

== DBU Pokalen ==
20 August 2014 Round 1	Viborg FF	0 - 2	AGF	Viborg, Denmark
18:00		Summary		Stadium: Viborg Stadion

== League table ==
Pos	Team	Pld	W	D	L	GF	GA	GD	Pts	Promotion or Relegation
1	Viborg FF	19	11	7	1	28	11	+17	40	Promotion to Danish Superliga
2	Lyngby Boldklub	19	11	4	4	34	19	+15	37	Promotion to Danish Superliga
3	AGF	19	10	4	5	32	18	+14	34	
4	Vendsyssel FF	19	9	5	5	24	17	+7	32	
5	Skive IK	19	5	9	5	24	25	−1	24	
6	AC Horsens	19	6	5	8	25	25	0	23	
7	Vejle BK	19	5	6	8	18	30	−12	21	
8	AB	19	5	5	9	19	28	−9	20	
9	HB Køge	18	4	7	7	14	24	−10	19	
10	FC Fredericia	19	3	9	7	17	23	−6	18	
11	Brønshøj Boldklub	19	3	8	8	14	23	−9	17	Relegation to Danish 2nd Divisions
12	FC Roskilde	18	3	7	8	21	26	−5	16	Relegation to Danish 2nd Divisions

Updated to match(es) played on 15 March. Source: DBU
Rules for classification: 1) points; 2) goal difference; 3) number of goals scored

== Current squad ==
As of 20 May 2014. Note: Flags indicate national team as defined under FIFA eligibility rules; some limited exceptions apply. Players may hold more than one non-FIFA nationality.

No.	Pos.	Nation	Player
2	DF	DEN	Jonas Thorsen
4	DF	DEN	Jacob Egeris
5	DF	DEN	Mikkel Rask
6	DF	DEN	Christopher Poulsen
8	DF	DEN	Patrick Nielsen
9	MF	DEN	Kevin Mensah
11	FW	CHI	Danilo Arrieta
13	MF	DEN	Jeppe Grønning
14	DF	USA	Babajide Ogunbiyi
15	DF	DEN	Kristoffer Pallesen

No.	Pos.	Nation	Player
16	FW	MKD	Aleksandar Stankov
17	FW	SWE	Ken Fagerberg
18	DF	DEN	Nicholas Gotfredsen
19	MF	DEN	Jeff Mensah
21	MF	DEN	David Boysen
23	MF	DEN	Marcel Rømer
24	MF	DEN	Lukas Lerager
27	MF	DEN	Sebastian Andersen
29	FW	DEN	Thomas Dalgaard
