= 2013–14 Viborg FF season =

Viborg
2013–14 season
- Superliga: 12th
- Danish Cup: Third Round

In 2013 to 2014, Viborg FF competed in the Danish Superliga and the Danish Cup.

== Danish Superliga ==
20 July 2013 Match 1	Viborg FF	2 - 2	Randers FC	Viborg, Denmark
17:00	Rask (yellow card) 73'; Stankov 76'; Ousmane Sarr 89'	Summary	Tamboura (yellow card) 25'; Schwartz 29', 79' (yellow card) 90'	Stadium: Viborg Stadion; Attendance: 4,771; Referee: (Denmark) Michael Johansen

26 July 2013 Match 2	FC Nordsjælland	1 - 1	Viborg FF	Farum
18:30	Stokholm 2'; Christiansen (yellow card) 75'; Tičinović (yellow card) 90'	Summary	Poulsen (yellow card) 21'; Lucas Jensen 53'; Peškovič (yellow card) 69'	Stadium: Farum Park; Attendance: 5,067; Referee: (Denmark) Peter Rasmussen

4 August 2013 Match 3	OB	4 - 2	Viborg FF	Odense
14:00	Kadrii 29', 30'; Larsen 58'; Falk 71'; Ruud (yellow card) 74'	Summary	Gotfredsen (yellow card) 24'; Stankov (yellow card) 33'; Rask 44' (yellow card) 54'; Poulsen (yellow card) 52'; Dalgaard 87'	Stadium: TRE-FOR Park; Attendance: 7,889; Referee: (Denmark) Peter Kjærsgaard-Andersen

9 August 2013 Match 4	Viborg FF	2 - 2	Brøndby IF	Viborg, Denmark
18:30	Stankov 44' (yellow card) 56'; Lucas Jensen (yellow card) 49'; Dalgaard 78'; Lukas Lerager (yellow card) 82'	Summary	Makienok (yellow card) 67' (goal) 90+1'; Antipas 70'	Stadium: Viborg Stadion; Attendance: 9,047; Referee: (Denmark) Lars Christoffersen

18 August 2013 Match 5	SønderjyskE	0 - 3	Viborg FF	Haderslev
17:00		Summary	Dalgaard 8', 30', 77'; Ogunbiyi (yellow card) 52'; Rask (yellow card) 62'; Gotfredsen (yellow card) 87'	Stadium: Haderslev Fodboldstadion; Attendance: 2,654; Referee: (Denmark) Anders Poulsen

25 August 2013 Match 6	Viborg FF	3 - 1	Esbjerg fB	Viborg, Denmark
15:00	Dalgaard 20' (pen.) 61'; Lukas Lerager (yellow card) 26'; Poulsen (yellow card) 60'; Ogunbiyi 67'	Summary	Ankersen 81'	Stadium: Viborg Stadion; Attendance: 5,156; Referee: (Denmark) Jakob Kehlet

1 September 2013 Match 7	Viborg FF	1 - 4	København	Viborg, Denmark
17:00	Patrick Bang Nielsen (yellow card) 37'	Summary	Claudemir 21'; Mellberg 33'; Delaney (yellow card) 57'; Vetokele 66'; Adi 80'	Stadium: Viborg Stadion; Attendance: 8,212; Referee: (Denmark) Kenn Hansen

15 September 2013 Match 8	AGF	0 - 1	Viborg FF	Aarhus
14:00	Eckersley (yellow card) 56'	Summary	Ogunbiyi 20'	Stadium: Atletion; Attendance: 9,625; Referee: (Denmark) Mads Kristoffersen

21 September 2013 Match 9	FC Midtjylland	0 - 0	Viborg FF	Herning
17:00	Curth (yellow card) 67'	Summary	Rømer (yellow card) 22'; Stankov (yellow card) 90+2'	Stadium: MCH Arena; Attendance: 9,195; Referee: (Denmark) Jakob Kehlet

27 September 2013 Match 10	Viborg FF	2 - 0	FC Vestsjælland	Viborg, Denmark
18:30	Nagel 87'; Mensah 90'	Summary		Stadium: Viborg Stadion; Attendance: 4,532; Referee: (Denmark) Kenn Hansen

6 October 2013 Match 11	AaB	3 - 1	Viborg FF	Aalborg
15:00	Kusk 18' (pen.); Petersen (yellow card) 39'; Jönsson 41', 59'; Nielsen (yellow card) 89'	Summary	Dalgaard 23'; Jonas Thorsen (yellow card) 82'	Stadium: Nordjyske Arena; Attendance: 6,872; Referee: (Denmark) Jakob Kehlet

20 October 2013 Match 12	Brøndby IF	0 - 0	Viborg FF	Brøndbyvester
17:00		Summary	Poulsen (yellow card) 55'	Stadium: Brøndby Stadium; Attendance: 16,607; Referee: (Denmark) Jens Maae

25 October 2013 Match 13	Viborg FF	4 - 1	FC Vestsjælland	Viborg, Denmark
18:30	Dalgaard 24'; Gotfredsen (yellow card) 35'; Rømer (yellow card) 44' (goal) 68'; Mensah 48', 53'	Summary	Lumb (yellow card) 25'; Thiago 43'; Lund (yellow card) 82'	Stadium: Viborg Stadion; Attendance: 4,221; Referee: (Denmark) Peter Kjærsgaard-Andersen

3 November 2013 Match 14	AGF	2 - 1	Viborg FF	Aarhus
14:00	Akharraz 45' (yellow card) 45+1'; Larsen 64'	Summary	Poulsen (yellow card) 57'; Rask (yellow card) 62'; Dalgaard 90' (pen.)	Stadium: Atletion; Attendance: 6,785; Referee: (Denmark) Mads Kristoffersen

8 November 2013 Match 15	Viborg FF	2 - 3	FC Midtjylland	Viborg, Denmark
18:30	Poulsen (yellow card) 32'; Stankov 62' (yellow card) 64'; Mensah 88'	Summary	Nielsen (yellow card) 27'; Larsen 29'; Juelsgård (yellow card) 47'; Banggaard (yellow card) 63'; Curth 65', 86'; Andersson (red card) 79'	Stadium: Viborg Stadion; Attendance: 7,563; Referee: (Denmark) Anders Poulsen

24 November 2013 Match 16	København	4 - 1	Viborg FF	Copenhagen
17:00	César Santin 1'; Vetokele 9', 26'; Melberg (yellow card) 36'; Toutouh (yellow card) 45' (goal) 69'; Gíslason (yellow card) 65'	Summary	Dalgaard 24'; Marcel Römer (yellow card) 56'	Stadium: Parken Stadium; Attendance: 14,227; Referee: (Denmark) Peter Rasmussen

30 November 2013 Match 17	Viborg FF	2 - 2	SønderjyskE	Viborg, Denmark
17:00	Aleksandar Stankov 6' (yellow card) 65'; Peškovič (yellow card) 38'; Dalgaard 50'; Poulsen (yellow card) 79'	Summary	Jensen 39'; Paulsen 74'; Bechmann (yellow card) 85'	Stadium: Viborg Stadion; Attendance: 3,478; Referee: (Denmark) Lars Christoffersen

9 December 2013 Match 18	AaB	5 - 0	Viborg FF	Aalborg
19:00	Dalsgaard 4'; Kusk 10'; Jacobsen 12'; Jönsson 48'; Thomsen 67'	Summary		Stadium: Nordjyske Arena; Attendance: 7,796; Referee: (Denmark) Jakob Kehlet

23 February 2014 Match 19	Viborg FF	1 - 1	Randers FC	Viborg, Denmark
14:00	Rømer (yellow card) 5'; Dalgaard 58'	Summary	Agesen (yellow card) 32'; Keller (yellow card) 64'; Lundberg 65'	Stadium: Viborg Stadion; Attendance: 1,546; Referee: (Denmark) Kenn Hansen

28 February 2014 Match 20	FC Nordsjælland	2 - 0	Viborg FF	Farum
18:30	Aabech 44', 55'	Summary	Boysen (yellow card) 53'	Stadium: Farum Park; Attendance: 3,112; Referee: (Denmark) Anders Poulsen

9 March 2014 Match 21	Viborg FF	1 - 3	Esbjerg fB	Viborg, Denmark
15:00	Dalgaard 14'; Lukas Lerager (yellow card) 32'	Summary	Bakenga 33' (yellow card) 52'; Ankersen 59'; Laursen (yellow card) 65'; Pušić (yellow card) 70'; Vestergaard 73'	Stadium: Viborg Stadion; Attendance: 3,834; Referee: (Denmark) Dennis Mogensen

16 March 2014 Match 22	OB	1 - 1	Viborg FF	Odense
14:00	Skúlason (yellow card) 7'; Spelmann (yellow card) 20'; Abdellaoue 22'	Summary	Gotfredsen (yellow card) 12'; Wílton Figueiredo (yellow card) 16'; Dalgaard 72' (yellow card) 85'	Stadium: TRE-FOR Park; Attendance: 5,618; Referee: (Denmark) Kenn Hansen

21 March 2014 Match 23	FC Vestsjælland	0 - 1	Viborg FF	Slagelse
18:30		Summary	Mensah 1'; Rømer (yellow card) 90+1'	Stadium: Slagelse Stadion; Attendance: 3,167; Referee: (Denmark) Jens Maae

30 March 2014 Match 24	Viborg FF	0 - 1	Brøndby IF	Viborg, Denmark
15:00	Stankov (yellow card) 12'; Poulsen (yellow card) 88'	Summary	Núñez 52'	Stadium: Viborg Stadion; Attendance: 7,736; Referee: (Denmark) Peter Kjærsgaard-Andersen

6 April 2014 Match 25	Viborg FF	2 - 2	OB	Viborg, Denmark
15:00	Dalgaard 43'; Egeris (yellow card) 45+1'; Gotfredsen (yellow card) 45+1' (yellow-red card); Stankov 55'; Wílton Figueiredo (yellow card) 69'	Summary	Abdellaoue 15', 26' (yellow card) 78'; Falk (yellow card) 90+3'; Toppel (yellow card) 90+4'	Stadium: Viborg Stadion; Attendance: 4,079; Referee: (Denmark) Mads Kristoffersen

13 April 2014 Match 26	Randers FC	3 - 1	Viborg FF	Randers
15:00	Dalgaard 6' (o.g.); Schwartz 24'; Brock-Madsen 86'	Summary	Kristoffer Pallesen (yellow card) 44'; Poulsen (yellow card) 68'; Jeff Mensah (yellow card) 72'; Wílton Figueiredo 90'	Stadium: AutoC Park Randers; Attendance: 4,593; Referee: (Denmark) Michael Johansen

16 April 2014 Match 27	Viborg FF	0 - 2	AaB	Viborg, Denmark
19:00	Stankov (yellow card) 19'; Wílton Figueiredo (red card) 25'	Summary	Ahlmann 49'; Egeris 60' (o.g.)	Stadium: Viborg Stadion; Attendance: 6,803; Referee: (Denmark) Jakob Kehlet

21 April 2014 Match 28	FC Midtjylland	5 - 2	Viborg FF	Herning
15:00	Igboun 25' (yellow card) 35'; Nielsen (yellow card) 58'; Larsen 60'; Andersson 79', 86'; Héðinsson 90'	Summary	Patrick Jensen 20' (o.g.); Jeff Mensah (yellow card) 22'; Rask (yellow card) 52'; Lerager (yellow card) 54'; Mensah 84'; Poulsen (yellow card) 85'; Boysen (yellow card) 90'	Stadium: MCH Arena; Attendance: 8,903; Referee: (Denmark) Mads Kristoffersen

27 April 2014 Match 29	Viborg FF	3 - 0	AGF	Viborg, Denmark
14:00	Dalgaard 44'; Mensah 50'; Rømer 62'	Summary	Nørregaard (yellow card) 42'	Stadium: Viborg Stadion; Attendance: 6,434; Referee: (Denmark) Michael Tykgaard

4 May 2014 Match 30	SønderjyskE	1 - 0	Viborg FF	Haderslev
14:00	Christensen (yellow card) 36'; Jensen 45+3' (yellow card) 75'	Summary	Gotfredsen (yellow card) 18'; Poulsen (yellow card) 43'; Rask (yellow card) 66'; Mensah (yellow card) 75'	Stadium: Haderslev Fodboldstadion; Attendance: 8,357; Referee: (Denmark) Michael Johansen

8 May 2014 Match 31	Viborg FF	0 - 2	København	Viborg, Denmark
19:00	Rømer (yellow card) 29'; Poulsen (yellow card) 84'	Summary	Cornelius (yellow card) 44'; Jørgensen 81'; Kristensen 85' (pen.)	Stadium: Viborg Stadion; Attendance: 4,701; Referee: (Denmark) Jens Maae

11 May 2014 Match 32	Viborg FF	1 - 3	FC Nordsjælland	Viborg, Denmark
17:00	Gotfredsen (yellow card) 53'; Dalgaard 55' (pen.); Rømer (yellow card) 67'	Summary	Larsen 4'; Hansen 5'; Jensen (yellow card) 36'; John 38'; Aabech (yellow card) 90+2'	Stadium: Viborg Stadion; Attendance: 4,728; Referee: (Denmark) Jakob Kehlet

18 May 2014 Match 33	Esbjerg fB	0 - 0	Viborg FF	Esbjerg
17:00	Ankersen (yellow card) 79'	Summary	Ogunbiyi (yellow card) 58'; Wílton Figueiredo (yellow card) 69'	Stadium: Blue Water Arena; Attendance: 9,853; Referee: (Denmark) Kenn Hansen

== League table ==
Pos	Team	Pld	W	D	L	GF	GA	GD	Pts	Qualification or relegation
8	OB	33	10	10	13	47	46	+1	40	
9	Vestsjælland	33	8	14	11	31	42	−11	38	
10	SønderjyskE	33	10	8	15	41	53	−12	38	
11	AGF (R)	33	9	5	19	38	60	−22	32	Relegation to Danish 1st Division
12	Viborg FF (R)	33	6	10	17	38	63	−25	28	Relegation to Danish 1st Division

Source: Danish Football Association (in Danish)
Rules for classification: 1) points; 2) goal difference; 3) number of goals scored.
(R) Relegated

== Danish Cup ==
28 August 2013 Round 2	Jammerbugt FC	0 - 1	Viborg FF	Pandrup
17:45		Summary		Stadium: Jetsmark Stadion

2 October 2013 Round 3	Lyngby BK	1 - 0	Viborg FF	Kongens Lyngby
19:00		Summary		Stadium: Lyngby Stadion

== Current squad ==
As of 13 July 2013. Note: Flags indicate national team as defined under FIFA eligibility rules; some limited exceptions apply. Players may hold more than one non-FIFA nationality.

No.	Pos.	Nation	Player
1	GK	SVK	Michal Peškovič
2	DF	DEN	Jonas Thorsen
3	MF	NOR	Andreas Hagen
4	DF	DEN	Jacob Egeris
5	DF	DEN	Mikkel Rask
6	DF	DEN	Christopher Poulsen
7	MF	DEN	Lucas Jensen
8	FW	DEN	Patrick Bang Nielsen
9	MF	DEN	Kevin Mensah
10	FW	DEN	Tobias Perch-Nielsen
11	FW	CHI	Danilo Arrieta
13	MF	DEN	Jeppe Grønning

No.	Pos.	Nation	Player
14	DF	USA	Babajide Ogunbiyi
15	DF	DEN	Kristoffer Pallesen
16	FW	MKD	Aleksandar Stankov
17	MF	SWE	Markus Gustafsson
18	DF	DEN	Nicholas Gotfredsen
19	MF	DEN	Jeff Mensah
20	MF	DEN	Simon Nagel
24	MF	DEN	Lukas Lerager
26	MF	DEN	Mathias Gertsen
29	FW	DEN	Thomas Dalgaard
32	GK	DEN	Kevin Ray Mendoza Hansen
