= Jeppe Grønning =

Danish footballer (born 1991)

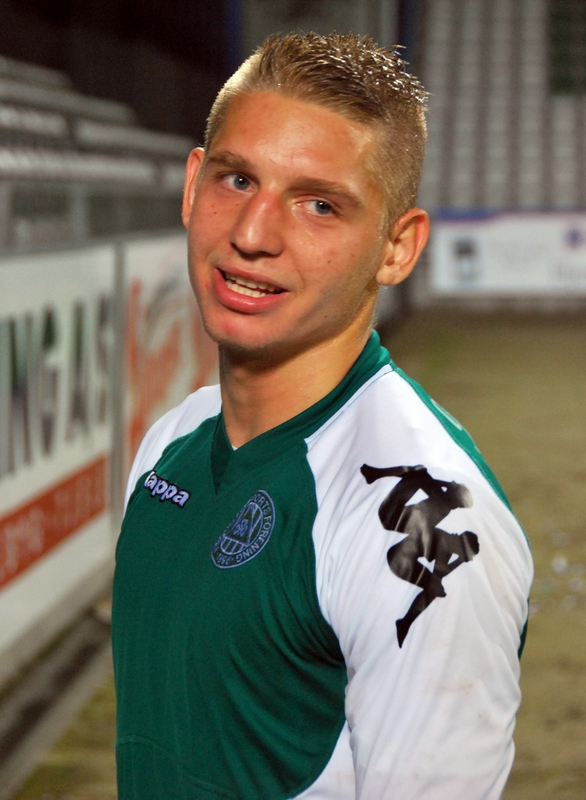
- Grønning in 2012

Personal information
- Full name: Jeppe Nørregaard Grønning
- Date of birth: 24 May 1991 (age 35)
- Place of birth: Odense, Denmark
- Height: 1.82 m (6 ft 0 in)
- Position: Midfielder

Team information
- Current team: Viborg
- Number: 13

Youth career
- B 1913

Senior career*
Years	Team	Apps	(Gls)
2009–2012	Fyn		
2012–	Viborg	395	(16)
2014	→ Hobro (loan)	15	(3)
- * Club domestic league appearances and goals as of 21:40, 25 October 2026 (UTC)

Jeppe Nørregaard Grønning (born 24 May 1991) is a Danish professional footballer who plays as a midfielder for and captains Danish Superliga club Viborg. He previously played for Fyn before joining Viborg, and spent time on loan at Hobro.

== Career ==
=== Fyn ===
Alongside his brother Andreas, Grønning started his senior career at FC Fyn, the parent club of his childhood club B 1913. At age 17, he signed his first professional contract on 29 December 2008, agreeing to a two-and-a-half-year deal with the club. He made his debut appearance, coming on as a substitute against AaB. During the remainder of the season, he made an additional 14 appearances, starting all remaining games in which he appeared. During the fall of the 2009–10 season, Grønning missed much of the first half of the season due to a groin injury. He later renewed his contract with the club, signing for an additional two years on 8 July 2010.

Fyn struggled in the early games of the 2010–11 season, while Grønning was still involved with the B 1913 reserve team during the season with intermittent appearances for the first team. Fyn were ultimately relegated to the 2011–12 Danish 2nd Division West. In the 2nd Division, Grønning established a strong partnership with Emil La Cour in the central midfield, and he was, among other things, involved in FC Fyn's promotion back to the 1st Division in the 2011–12 season, where the club beat HIK in the decisive playoff match for promotion. His time with the club ended with 38 appearances and two goals before his contract expired at the end of the 2011–12 season.

During his time at Fyn, Grønning was called up on two occasions for the Denmark under-18 team; however, both call-ups were canceled before he could make any appearance.

=== Viborg ===
Grønning joined Viborg in the summer of 2012, signing a two-year contract with the Danish 1st Division club. He requested and was given the number 13 shirt due to the connection both he and his family had with his youth club, B 1913. Within the first six months of his debut season with the club, he was highlighted as a key player within the squad by his teammate Simon Nagel. He was named as the 2013 Autumn Profile by Viborg's fan group, Grøn Fight.

When Viborg returned to the Danish Superliga in the 2013–14 season, Grønning saw limited playing time due to injuries. He was loaned out to Hobro IK of the Danish 1st Division on transfer deadline day, alongside teammate Sebastian Andersen. After a half-season in which he made 15 appearances for Hobro, he returned to Viborg in June when the loan agreement expired. With Hobro gaining promotion to the Superliga and Viborg relegated to the 1st Division, Grønning expressed his desire to stay with a Superliga club.

Grønning ultimately stayed with Viborg for their 2014–15 season, returning to the success and regular football he had previously. In January 2015, he signed a contract extension with the club, keeping him in Viborg until the summer of 2017. With the club later securing the 1st Division title, Grønning had won promotion in four consecutive years, though continued to express desire to remain a Superliga player. During the 2015–16 season, by fan vote, he was again named as Viborg's Autumn Profile. He was later named as "Fighter of the Year" by the club for his performance during the season.

Grønning signed a new contract with Viborg in December 2016, extending to the summer of 2019. With the departure of captain Mikkel Rask, he was named as one of the club's deputy captains in February 2017. By September, he was named as the club's permanent captain, replacing Jonas Kamper who had been appointed earlier in 2017. He earned his third-consecutive "Fighter of the Year" award in November at the club's annual award dinner in November, and a fourth the following year in 2018. In January 2019, he agreed to another contract with the club on a three-and-a-half-year deal through to the summer of 2022, later extending it through to the summer of 2024.

In May 2023, Grønning further extended his contract with Viborg until 2026. With the announcement, he stated his intention to retire with the club. In October 2024, the club announced he had again won their "Fighter of the Year" award for a 10th consecutive year. Grønning celebrated his 400th appearance for Viborg during the 2025–26 season. Viborg announced a new deal with Grønning on 5 February 2026, extending his contract with the club until the summer of 2027.

== Personal life ==
Grønning married his wife, Christine, in 2013. The couple met during his time playing for Viborg due to teammate Kevin Mensah.

Jeppe's grandfather Kurt Grønning played for B 1913 and the Denmark national football team during the 1960s. His father, Carsten, also played for B 1913.

== Career statistics ==
As of match played 25 October 2026

Appearances and goals by club, season and competition
Club	Season	League			Danish Cup		Continental		Other		Total	
Club	Season	Division	Apps	Goals	Apps	Goals	Apps	Goals	Apps	Goals	Apps	Goals
Viborg	2012–13	Danish 1st Division	28	0	0	0	—		—		28	0
Viborg	2013–14	Danish Superliga	5	0	0	0	—		—		5	0
Viborg	2014–15	Danish 1st Division	30	0	0	0	—		—		30	0
Viborg	2015–16	Danish Superliga	28	0	0	0	—		—		28	0
Viborg	2016–17	Danish Superliga	31	0	0	0	—		6 (Note: Appearances in 2016–17 Danish Superliga relegation play-offs)	0	37	0
Viborg	2017–18	Danish 1st Division	30	2	1	0	—		—		31	2
Viborg	2018–19	Danish 1st Division	30	4	0	0	—		2 (Note: Appearances in 2018–19 Danish 1st Division promotion play-offs)	0	32	4
Viborg	2019–20	Danish 1st Division	31	1	1	0	—		—		32	1
Viborg	2020–21	Danish 1st Division	29	2	0	0	—		—		29	2
Viborg	2021–22	Danish Superliga	29	2	0	0	—		—		29	2
Viborg	2022–23	Danish Superliga	31	1	3	0	5 (Note: Appearances in 2022–23 UEFA Europa Conference League)	0	—		39	1
Viborg	2023–24	Danish Superliga	25	0	2	2	—		—		27	2
Viborg	2024–25	Danish Superliga	26	3	3	1	—		—		29	4
Viborg	2025–26	Danish Superliga	30	1	6	1	—		—		36	2
Viborg	2026–27	Danish Superliga	12	0	1	0	—		—		13	0
Viborg	Total		395	16	17	4	5	0	8	0	425	20
Hobro (loan)	2013–14	Danish 1st Division	15	3	0	0	—		—		15	3
Career total			410	19	17	4	5	0	8	0	440	23

== Honours ==
Viborg

- Danish 1st Division: 2012–13, 2014–15, 2020–21
