= Aleksandar Stankov =

Aleksandar Stankov may refer to:

- Aleksandar Stankov (footballer) (born 1991), Macedonian footballer
- Aleksandar Stankov (football manager) (born 1964), Bulgarian football manager
