= Mike Grella =

American soccer player (born 1987)

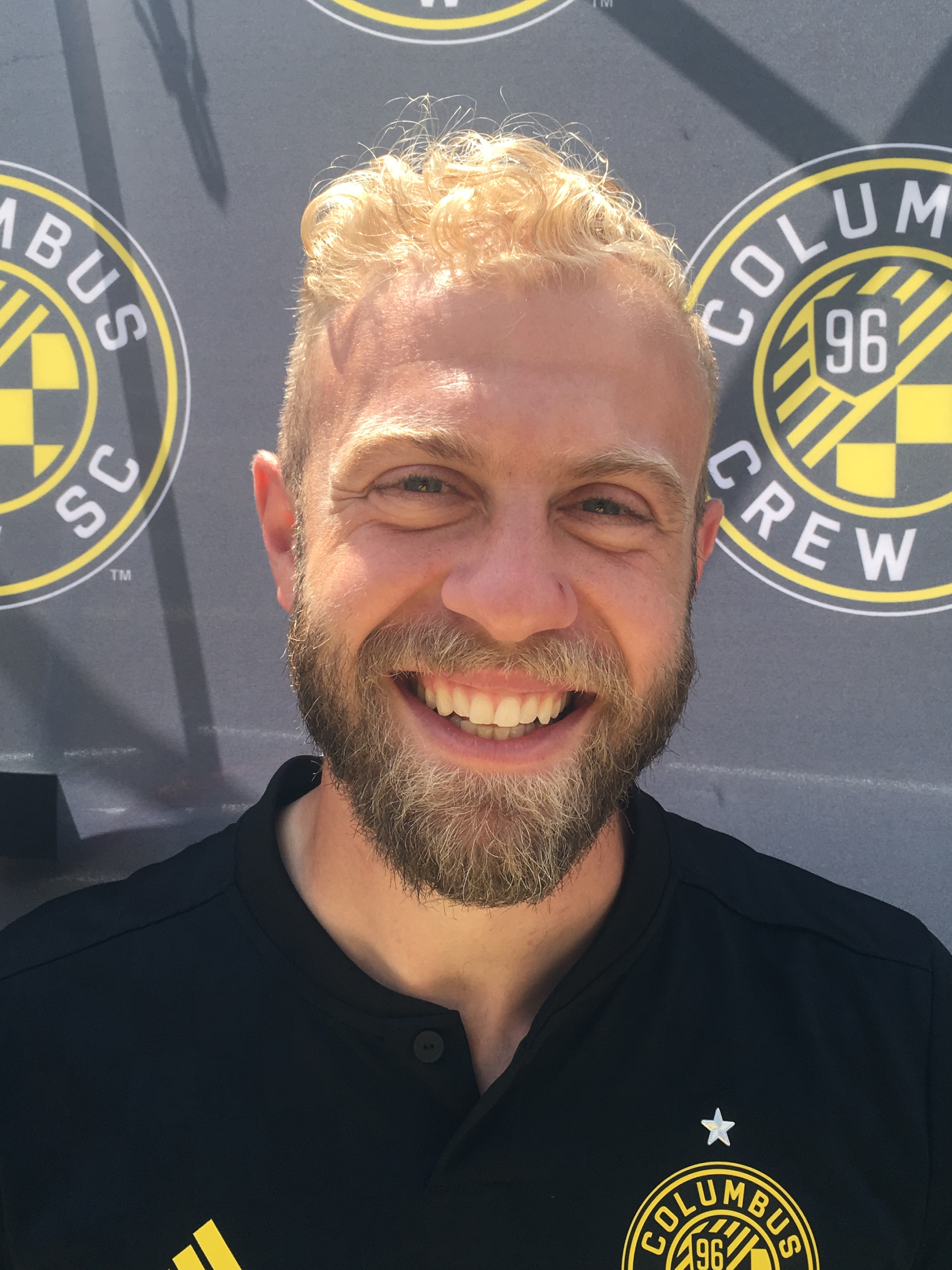
- Grella in 2018

Personal information
- Full name: Michele Grella
- Date of birth: January 23, 1987 (age 39)
- Place of birth: Glen Cove, New York, United States
- Height: 5 ft 11 in (1.80 m)
- Position: Winger

College career
Years	Team	Apps	(Gls)
2005–2008	Duke Blue Devils	80	(41)

Senior career*
Years	Team	Apps	(Gls)
2007–2008	Long Island Rough Riders	17	(10)
2008	Cary Clarets	3	(2)
2009–2011	Leeds United	29	(1)
2010	→ Carlisle United (loan)	10	(3)
2011	→ Swindon Town (loan)	7	(1)
2011–2012	Brentford	11	(0)
2012	Bury	10	(4)
2012–2013	Scunthorpe United	25	(1)
2013	Viborg FF	2	(0)
2014	Carolina RailHawks	7	(2)
2015–2017	New York Red Bulls	73	(16)
2018	Columbus Crew SC	12	(1)
Total		207	(41)

International career
- United States U18
- United States U20
- * Club domestic league appearances and goals as of November 26, 2018

Michele Grella (born January 23, 1987) is an American former professional soccer player who played as a forward and winger. He is currently a soccer analyst for CBS Sports Network and Paramount+.

== Club career ==
=== Youth and amateur ===
Grella was born in Glen Cove, New York, and had a highly successful youth career playing as a striker. He was a 2003 and 2004 Parade Magazine High School All American soccer player and the 2004 NSCAA National High School Player of the Year for the Glen Cove Big Red. He led his club team, the Albertson Red Storm, to both the 2003 and 2004 USYSA National Championships and the Red Storm Academy to the 2004 Super Y-League Championship. Grella played college soccer for Duke University, where he was a 2008 first team All American.

During the 2007 collegiate offseason, he played for the Long Island Rough Riders in the fourth division USL Premier Development League. In 2008, he played five more games for Long Island before switching to play for the Cary RailHawks U23s mid-season.

=== Leeds United ===
==== 2008–09 season ====
In February 2009, he was drafted in the third round (34th overall) of the 2009 MLS SuperDraft by Toronto FC; however, Grella decided against signing for the Canadian club, and instead tried his luck at playing in Europe. Grella went on trial with Leeds United in January 2009, and scored a hat-trick for the club's reserves against Barnsley. He also scored a goal in a behind-closed-doors game, with news of a permanent deal pending. He signed a full-time contract for Leeds on transfer deadline day, February 2, 2009, until the end of the 2009–10 season.

He made his Leeds debut on February 14, 2009, after coming on as a 74th-minute substitute for Lee Trundle in a 1–0 defeat to Huddersfield Town. His first season in professional football was mainly spent making short cameos as a substitute during Leeds' fight for promotion. He came on late in Leeds' play-off semi-final against Millwall but was unable to score during his first-team appearances for Leeds.

==== 2009–10 season ====
Grella scored his first senior goal for Leeds in a pre-season friendly against Burnley. On August 10, 2009, he was voted man of the match in a League Cup match against Darlington. He signed a new long-term contract with Leeds.

Grella had to wait just over seven months for his first league start. Replacing the injured Jermaine Beckford in the starting lineup for the visit of Stockport County to Elland Road on September 5, 2009, he scored his first league goal eight minutes into the game, curling in an opportunistic effort from the edge of the penalty area.

Grella scored for Leeds after coming on as a late substitute in the 2–0 FA Cup win against Oldham Athletic. He repeated this FA Cup goalscoring form on December 8, 2009, in the FA Cup replay against Kettering Town, coming on as a substitute during the second period of extra time. Grella scored twice as Leeds won the game 5–1, taking his goals tally for Leeds to four. Grella started for Leeds in the Football League Trophy game against Accrington Stanley. He started the Football League Trophy Northern Area final first leg against Carlisle United.

Grella's fifth goal of the season for Leeds came in Football League Trophy Northern Area final second leg against Carlisle United. With Grella coming on as a second-half substitute and scoring the late winner to send the tie to penalties, but Leeds ended up exiting the tournament after losing 6–5 on penalties (with Grella converting one). After coming on as a first-half substitute against Norwich City, Grella was given a start against Swindon Town after Luciano Becchio's head injury ruled him out. Grella dropped back onto the bench for the rest of the season, and was limited to late substitute appearances. Leeds were promoted as League One runners-up after beating Bristol Rovers. Over the course of the season, Grella was unable to break up the 48-goal partnership between Jermaine Beckford and Becchio and had to settle for a role mainly as a substitute.

==== 2010–11 season ====
He made his first appearance in the Championship when he came on in the opening fixture as a second-half substitute in the loss to Derby County and remained on Leeds' bench as an unused substitute in the opening fixtures. After the arrival of Ross McCormack and the emergence of Davide Somma saw Grella dropped down the pecking order at Leeds, Grella was set to go out on loan in order to gain some more first-team experience. On transfer deadline day, he turned down a loan move to League Two side Oxford United. To help maintain match fitness, Grella played 90 minutes in Leeds' 3–1 behind-closed-doors friendly win against Middlesbrough on September 14, scoring a brace in the process. On September 22, 2010, Grella turned down the opportunity of joining Bradford City on loan. Simon Grayson revealed his disappointment that Grella turned down the loan move as he wanted him to get a regular run of games out on loan.

==== Carlisle United and Swindon Town loan spells ====
On October 12, 2010, Grella joined Carlisle United on a month's loan to gain some more first-team experience and gain regular football. He joined fellow Leeds loanee Ľubo Michalík, who was already at the club. Grella made his debut as a second-half substitute against Exeter City, he started the next game against Charlton Athletic, and scored his first goal for the club. He scored in his second-consecutive game, against Bristol Rovers. Leeds refused permission for Grella to play for Carlisle in the FA Cup against Tipton Town. After impressing during his first month at Carlisle, Grella's loan was extended to January 1, 2011, with Leeds including a 24-hour recall clause. Carlisle had requested to loan Grella for the entire season but had that request turned down by Ken Bates. On November 20, Grella scored his third goal for Carlisle against Walsall.

On January 20, 2011, Scottish Premier League side Motherwell announced they had signed Grella on loan until the end of the 2010–11 season. Grella returned to Leeds the following day, however, when it became clear that he could not play for Motherwell as he had already played for two different clubs (Leeds and Carlisle) earlier in the season.

On February 24, 2011, Grella agreed to join Swindon Town on loan until the end of the 2010–11 season. He scored his first goal for Swindon against Dagenham & Redbridge on March 12. This spell ended on April 12, after Grella decided he was being overlooked since Paul Hart took charge, despite making five starts in seven games. He returned to Leeds but was unable to play for the club until his loan at Swindon had expired at the end of the season.

==== 2011–12 season ====
Leeds chairman Ken Bates announced on May 12 that Grella was to be transfer listed by Leeds as he did not figure in the club's future plans.

On June 8, Grella was given permission to train with American team New York Cosmos, with a view to a permanent deal; however, Grella said whilst it was an interesting opportunity, he was looking to stay at a club in England. After training with the Cosmos, Grella returned to pre-season training with Leeds, but revealed on his Twitter account that he was 99% sure he would be leaving Leeds. Grella played against Bradford Park Avenue in a pre-season friendly. He then played for a Leeds XI in a behind-closed-doors friendly against Leicester City, scoring twice. He then was set to play for a Leeds reserve XI against Farsley Celtic.

=== Brentford ===
On August 26, 2011, Grella joined League One side Brentford on an emergency loan deal. His contract with Leeds was due to be terminated later in the week so that he could sign a permanent deal that ran run until the end of the season. Grella made his debut in a 2–0 loss against Tranmere Rovers. Following his permanent move to Brentford, Grella made his debut in a 1–1 draw against Colchester United. On November 8, 2011, on his first full start for the club, Grella scored four goals in a 6–0 victory over Bournemouth in the Football League Trophy; however, once again, he failed to establish himself in Brentford boss Uwe Rosler's plans.

On February 14, Grella left the club after having his contract terminated by mutual consent.

=== Bury ===
Following his release from Brentford, Bury completed the signing of Grella on a short-term contract until the end of the 2011–12 season on February 27, 2012. One day after signing for the club, Grella made his debut for the club in a 2–1 loss against Hartlepool United. On April 9, 2012, Grella scored his first goal in a 4–1 win over Colchester United. Five days later, he scored his second goal, the only goal of the game in a victory over Bournemouth. On April 21, 2012, Grella scored a brace in a 4–2 victory over Notts County. This win helped to ensure League 1 safety for the Shakers and gave Notts County play-off hopes a huge blow.

Having scored four goals in his short spell with the club, manager Richard Barker offered Grella a new deal for the 2012–13 season; however, Grella rejected a new deal after agreeing terms with an as-yet-unnamed club. After his move, Barker said: "He became extremely popular with the fans, the players and my staff."

=== Scunthorpe United ===
After rejecting a new deal in favor of joining an unnamed club, a number of League One and League Two clubs had been tracking him, including Bradford City and Scunthorpe United. Grella publicly stated that he wished to join Scunthorpe and that talks were at an advanced stage, after manager Alan Knill publicly declared interest in the striker. On July 9, Grella confirmed that he had signed a two-year deal with Scunthorpe. He made his competitive debut for the club on August 14, in a League Cup first-round match against Derby County, also scoring in their 5–5 eventual victory.

=== Viborg ===
Grella was released at the end of the 2012–13 season by mutual consent. He signed with Viborg FF in the Danish Superliga in October 2013. He left the club at the end of 2013 after appearing in two league matches as a substitute.

=== RailHawks ===
Grella signed with the Carolina RailHawks in April 2014 for the spring season of the North American Soccer League. On May 17, 2014, he scored his first goal for the club in a 2–0 victory over the Atlanta Silverbacks converting a penalty kick to help Carolina to a 1–0 lead. On May 31, 2014, before a regular season record crowd at WakeMed Soccer Park, Grella scored the opening goal in a 2–0 victory over the Tampa Bay Rowdies.

=== New York Red Bulls ===
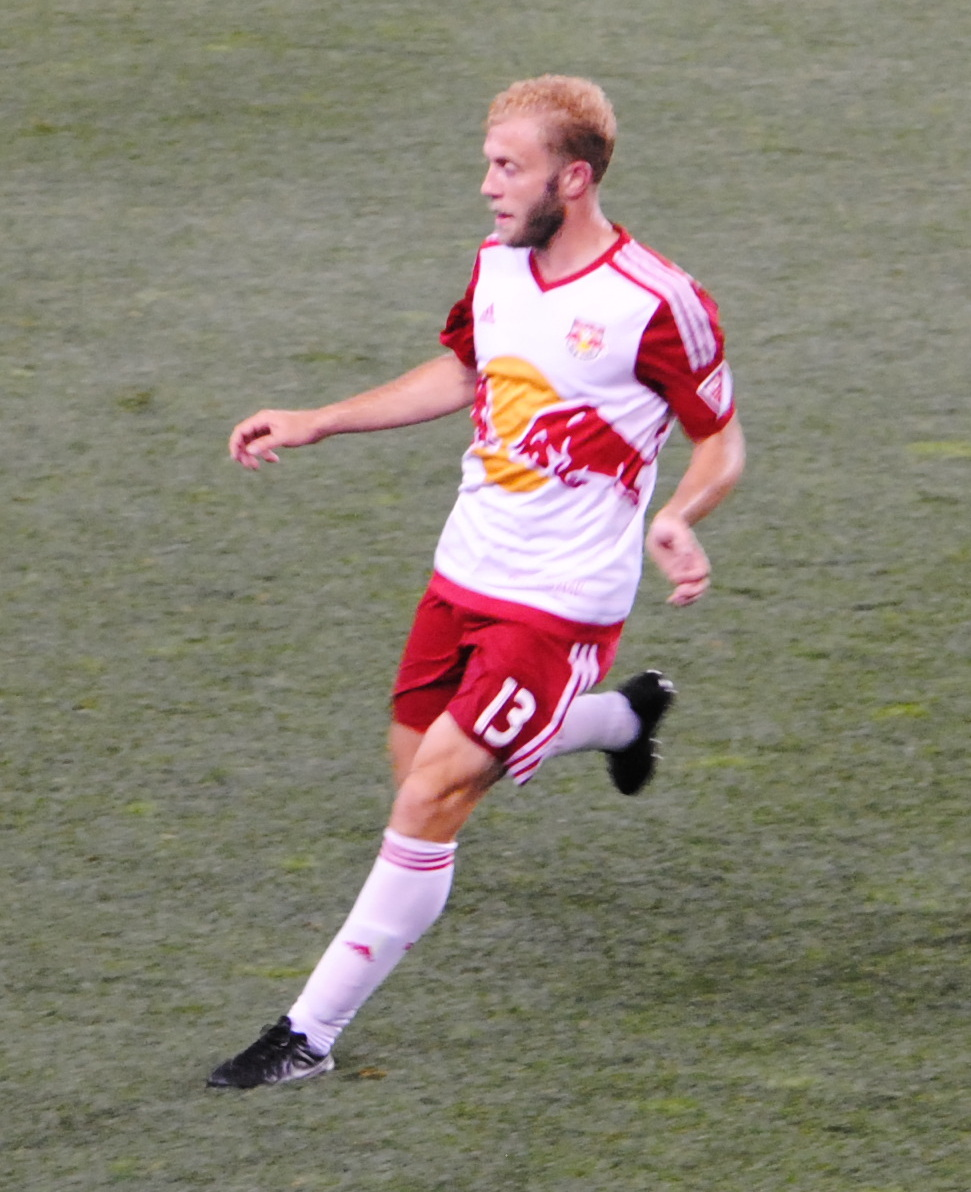
Grella playing for the New York Red Bulls in 2015.

On February 17, 2015, Grella signed with New York Red Bulls of Major League Soccer after a successful trial spell. Grella made his debut for New York on March 8, appearing as a starter in a 1–1 draw at Sporting Kansas City.

On March 28, 2015, Grella scored his first goal for New York and the 1,000th goal in club history in a 2–1 victory over Columbus Crew. On April 17, 2015, Grella scored his second goal of the season for New York in a 2–0 victory over the San Jose Earthquakes. On June 5, 2015, Grella scored his third goal of the season in a 4–2 loss against the Houston Dynamo. On June 24, 2015, Grella scored New York's lone goal in a victory over Real Salt Lake. On July 1, 2015, Grella scored his fifth goal of the season for New York, helping them to a 4–1 victory in the U.S. Open Cup over local rival New York Cosmos. On July 19, 2015, Grella scored his sixth goal of the season in a 2–0 victory over Orlando City SC. On September 11, 2015, Grella helped New York to a 3–2 victory over Chicago Fire SC, scoring the equalizing goal. On October 18, 2015, in a 4–1 victory over Philadelphia Union, Grella scored seven seconds into the match, the fastest goal in MLS history, dislodging former Red Bull Tim Cahill. Grella added another goal in the match, helping New York clinch the Eastern Conference regular season title. After a breakout 2015 season, supporters began calling him "Grelladinho" due to his style of play, flashy goals and ability to take on defenders with skillful dribbling.

On March 19, 2016, Grella scored his first goal of the season in helping New York to a 4–3 victory over Houston Dynamo. On April 24, 2016, Grella scored his second goal of the season and assisted on another in helping New York to a 3–2 victory over Orlando City SC. On April 29, 2016, Grella helped New York to a 4–0 victory against FC Dallas, scoring his third goal of the season. On June 19, 2016, Grella scored two goals in a 2–0 victory against the Seattle Sounders FC. His performance earned him MLS Player of the week honors.

=== Columbus Crew SC ===
After an injury-shortened 2017 season, New York declined Grella's 2018 contract option and he entered the 2017 MLS Re-Entry Draft, held on December 15, 2017. He was selected in the first round by Colorado Rapids and immediately traded to Columbus Crew SC in exchange for a second-round pick in the 2019 MLS SuperDraft.

Grella made his debut for Columbus on April 28, 2018, appearing as a substitute in the 65th minute and scoring the game-winning goal in a 2–1 win at home. His contract option was declined by the club at the end of the season, after he had appeared in twelve games with one goal.

== International career ==
Grella has represented the United States at both under-18 and under-20 level. He holds both American and Italian passports. Grella admitted he was looking to be called up by the full USA national side, and was hoping to break into the World Cup squad, but he said his lack of playing time at Leeds made the opportunity of a call up very slim.

== Personal life ==
Grella is married to Jessica, with whom he has two children. His family is originally from Sturno, Italy. He is an ardent supporter of Juventus.

As of April 2022, he is currently a Serie A analyst at Paramount+ and occasionally for MLS Season Pass.

== Career statistics ==
Appearances and goals by club, season and competition
Club	Season	League			Domestic Cup (Note: Includes the FA Cup and U.S. Open Cup)		League Cup (Note: All appearances in Football League Cup)		Continental (Note: All appearances in CONCACAF Champions League)		Other		Total	
Club	Season	Division	Apps	Goals	Apps	Goals	Apps	Goals	Apps	Goals	Apps	Goals	Apps	Goals
Long Island Rough Riders	2007	USL PDL	12	5	0	0	–		–		–		12	5
Long Island Rough Riders	2008	USL PDL	5	5	–		–		–		–		5	5
Long Island Rough Riders	Total		17	10	0	0	0	0	0	0	0	0	17	10
Cary Clarets	2008	USL PDL	3	2	–		–		–		–		3	2
Leeds United	2008–09	League One	11	0	0	0	0	0	–		1 (Note: Appearance in Football League One play-offs)	0	12	0
Leeds United	2009–10	League One	18	1	4	3	3	0	–		4 (Note: Appearance(s) in Football League Trophy)	1	29	5
Leeds United	2010-11	Championship	1	0	0	0	1	0	–		–		2	0
Leeds United	Total		30	1	4	3	4	0	0	0	5	1	43	5
Carlisle United (loan)	2010–11	League One	10	3	0	0	0	0	–		1	0	11	3
Swindon Town (loan)	2010–11	League One	7	1	0	0	0	0	–		0	0	7	1
Brentford	2011–12	League One	11	0	2	0	0	0	–		4	4	17	4
Bury	2011–12	League One	10	4	0	0	0	0	–		0	0	10	4
Scunthorpe United	2012–13	League One	25	1	1	0	2	1	–		1	0	29	2
Viborg	2013–14	Danish Superliga	2	0	0	0	–		–		–		2	0
Carolina RailHawks	2014	NASL	7	2	2	0	–		–		–		9	2
New York Red Bulls	2015	MLS	33	9	3	1	–		–		4 (Note: Appearances in the MLS Cup Playoffs)	0	40	10
New York Red Bulls	2016	MLS	32	7	2	1	–		2	0	2	0	38	8
New York Red Bulls	2017	MLS	8	0	1	0	–		2	0	0	0	11	0
New York Red Bulls	Total		73	16	6	2	0	0	4	0	6	0	89	18
Columbus Crew SC	2018	MLS	12	1	0	0	–		–		0	0	12	1
Career total			207	41	15	5	6	1	4	0	17	5	249	52

== Honors ==
Leeds United

- Football League One second-place promotion: 2009–10

New York Red Bulls

- MLS Supporters' Shield: 2015
