= Kurt Grønning =

Danish footballer (1936–2025)

Personal information
- Date of birth: 5 August 1936
- Date of death: 6 October 2025 (aged 89)
- Position: Half back

Youth career
- 1945–?: B 1913

Senior career*
Years	Team	Apps	(Gls)
1955–1965	B 1913		

International career
1963–1964	Denmark	4	(0)
- * Club domestic league appearances and goals

Kurt Grønning (5 August 1936 – 6 October 2025) was a Danish footballer who played as a half back. He made four appearances for the Denmark national team from 1963 to 1964.

Grønning was the grandfather of Jeppe Grønning, who spent much of his career with Danish club Viborg FF.

Grønning died on 6 October 2025, at the age of 89.
