= Emil La Cour =

Danish footballer (born 1991)

Personal information
- Date of birth: 19 July 1991 (age 35)
- Place of birth: Svendborg, Denmark
- Height: 1.80 m (5 ft 11 in)
- Position: Midfielder

Youth career
- FC Svendborg

Senior career*
Years	Team	Apps	(Gls)
2008–2010	FC Svendborg	?	(?)
2010–2012	FC Fyn	28	(2)
2012–2013	Silkeborg IF	4	(0)
2013–2016	Marienlyst	23	(0)
- * Club domestic league appearances and goals

Emil La Cour (born 19 July 1991) is a Danish former professional footballer. He played as a midfielder.

== Career ==
Rising through the ranks of FC Svendborg, La Cour grew out to become a key player for the 2nd Division (third-tier) club, before being signed by local rivals FC Fyn on 25 June 2010. He had earlier been on a trial at AGF, without this amounting to a transfer. He established a strong partnership with Jeppe Grønning in the central midfield area while playing for FC Fyn, helping them achieve promotion to the second tier in the 2011–12 season.

In June 2012, La Cour signed a four-year contract with Silkeborg IF on 11 June 2012 after a successful trial, where he was initially placed in the reserve team. He made his debut for Silkeborg in the Danish Superliga on 1 September 2012, coming on as an 86th-minute substitute for Marvin Pourié against AGF, a match which Silkeborg lost 4–0. A few days later, on 4 September, he played against his former club, FC Svendborg, in a Danish Cup matchup at Høje Bøge Stadium, with Silkeborg winning 2–0. La Cour made a total of seven appearances for the club.

On 2 September 2013, La Cour's contract with Silkeborg was terminated and he instead signed with Danish 1st Division (second-tier) club BK Marienlyst.

== Personal life ==
After retiring, La Cour worked as a senior consultant at the Confederation of Danish Industry (DI).
