= Lucas Jensen =

Danish footballer (born 1994)

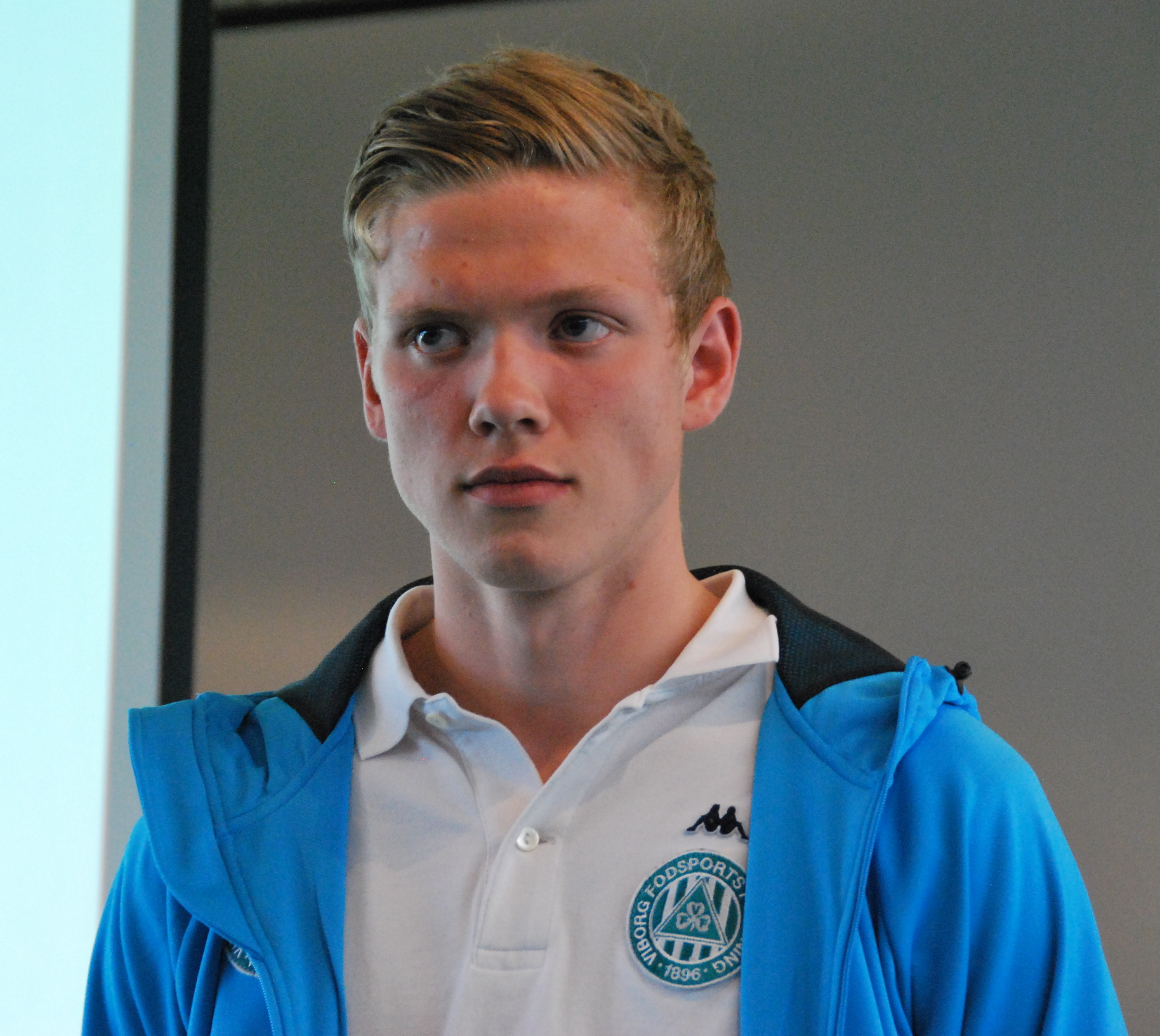
- Lucas Jensen at Viborg FF in 2012

Personal information
- Full name: Lucas Tomas Jensen
- Date of birth: 8 October 1994 (age 32)
- Place of birth: Holstebro, Denmark
- Height: 1.84 m (6 ft 0 in)
- Position: Winger

Team information
- Current team: Middelfart
- Number: 70

Youth career
- Holstebro BK
- FK Viborg
- Viborg FF

Senior career*
Years	Team	Apps	(Gls)
2012–2014	Viborg FF	61	(5)
2014–2016	OB	24	(0)
2016–2017	Hobro	30	(2)
2017–2019	Vendsyssel	57	(8)
2019–2021	Vejle	50	(3)
2021–2025	Vendsyssel	111	(11)
2025–	Middelfart	9	(1)

International career
2012	Denmark U18	6	(1)
2012–2013	Denmark U19	8	(0)
2013	Denmark U20	2	(0)
- * Club domestic league appearances and goals as of 7 December 2025

Lucas Tomas Jensen (Danish pronunciation: [ˈlukʰæs ˈjensn̩]; born 8 October 1994) is a Danish professional footballer who plays as a winger for Danish 1st Division side Middelfart.

Jensen started his career with Viborg FF, where he made his professional debut. He signed with Odense Boldklub in 2014 and played there for two years before having cancelled his contract. Jensen later signed a one-year deal with Hobro IK. He left after one season after his contract expired, and signed with Vendsyssel FF, helping both Hobro and Vendsyssel to promotion to the Danish Superliga in the 2016–17 and 2017–18 seasons.

== Club career ==
=== Viborg FF ===
Jensen played his first official game for VFF on 5 April 2012, in a match against AB, which ended 2–2. Jensen came on the pitch in the 60th minute.

=== OB ===
At the age of 19, Jensen joined the Danish Superliga club Odense Boldklub on 17 January 2014.

Jensen got his debut for OB on 25 July 2014 against FC Vestsjælland.

His time in Odense came to an end on 14 July 2016, when his contract was cancelled by mutual agreement.

=== Hobro IK ===
On 14 July 2016, the same day as his contract was cancelled by OB, Hobro IK, who had just been relegated to the Danish second division signed Jensen to a one-year deal. On 21 July 2016, exactly a week after being signed, Jensen made his competitive debut in Hobro's season opener against FC Roskilde, an away defeat that ended 3–1. On 12 March 2017, he scored his only goals for Hobro, a brace, in the 5–1 away win over Vejle Boldklub. After the season, which saw Hobro promote to the Danish Superliga, Jensen's contract was not extended.

=== Vendsyssel FF ===
On 15 June 2017, Jensen signed with Danish second division club Vendsyssel FF on a two-year contract. Jensen made his debut on 30 July 2017 in a 2–0 home win against Fremad Amager where he scored both goals.

=== Vejle BK ===
Newly relegated Danish 1st Division club Vejle Boldklub announced on 1 July 2019, that they had signed Jensen on a free transfer.

=== Return to Vendsyssel ===
On 22 August 2021, Jensen returned to his former club Vendsyssel FF. On 28 May 2025, Vendsyssel FF confirmed that Jensen would leave the club. after a disappointing season which ended in relegation.

Jensen left Vendsyssel in June 2025.

=== Middelfart ===
On 29 August 2025, Jensen joined newly promoted Danish 1st Division side Middelfart.

== Personal life ==
Jensen has studied at Viborg Katedralskole and Hald Ege Efterskole.
