= Antonio Stankov =

Dutch-Macedonian professional footballer (born 1991)

Personal information
- Full name: Antonio Stankov
- Date of birth: 19 February 1991 (age 35)
- Place of birth: Štip, SFR Yugoslavia
- Height: 1.85 m (6 ft 1 in)
- Position: Right-back

Team information
- Current team: KFC Esperanza Pelt
- Number: 10

Youth career
- vv Swalmen
- SVC 2000
- Roda JC

Senior career*
Years	Team	Apps	(Gls)
2010–2012	Roda JC	0	(0)
2012	→ Oss (loan)	15	(2)
2012–2014	MVV	55	(7)
2014–2016	Viborg	16	(0)
2015–2016	→ Vejle (loan)	22	(0)
2017	Achilles '29	16	(3)
2017–2019	Dordrecht	65	(2)
2019–2020	Pyunik	13	(1)
2021–2022	Diest		
2022–2023	Houtvenne	26	(1)
2023–2025	Turkse Rangers		
2025–	KFC Esperanza Pelt	0	(0)

International career
2009–2012	Macedonia U21	20	(0)
- * Club domestic league appearances and goals as of 16 January 2026

Antonio Stankov (born 19 February 1991) is a Dutch-Macedonian professional footballer who plays as a right-back for KFC Esperanza Pelt.

== Career ==
=== Club ===
On 2 July 2020, FC Pyunik announced that Stankov had left the club after his contract had expired.

=== International ===
At international level he has played for the U-21 Macedonian national team since 2009 till 2012, and has been capped 20 times (3 times in 2009 and 2011 and 7 times in 2010 and 2012).

== Personal life ==
He is the twin brother of professional footballer Aleksandar Stankov.

== Career statistics ==
=== Club ===
As of match played 5 May 2017

Appearances and goals by club, season and competition
Club	Season	League			National Cup		Other		Total	
Club	Season	Division	Apps	Goals	Apps	Goals	Apps	Goals	Apps	Goals
FC Oss (loan)	2011–12	Eerste Divisie	15	2	1	0	0	0	16	2
MVV	2012–13	Eerste Divisie	30	4	1	0	2 (Note: Appearances in the Eerste Divisie promotion play-offs)	0	33	4
MVV	2013–14	Eerste Divisie	25	3	1	0	0	0	26	3
MVV	MVV Maastricht		55	7	2	0	2	0	59	7
Viborg	2014–15	Danish 1st Division	16	0	0	0	0	0	16	0
Vejle	2015–16	Danish 1st Division	22	0	0	0	0	0	22	0
Achilles '29	2016–17	Eerste Divisie	16	3	0	0	0	0	16	3
Career total			124	12	3	0	2	0	129	12
