= Babajide Ogunbiyi =

American soccer player (born 1986)

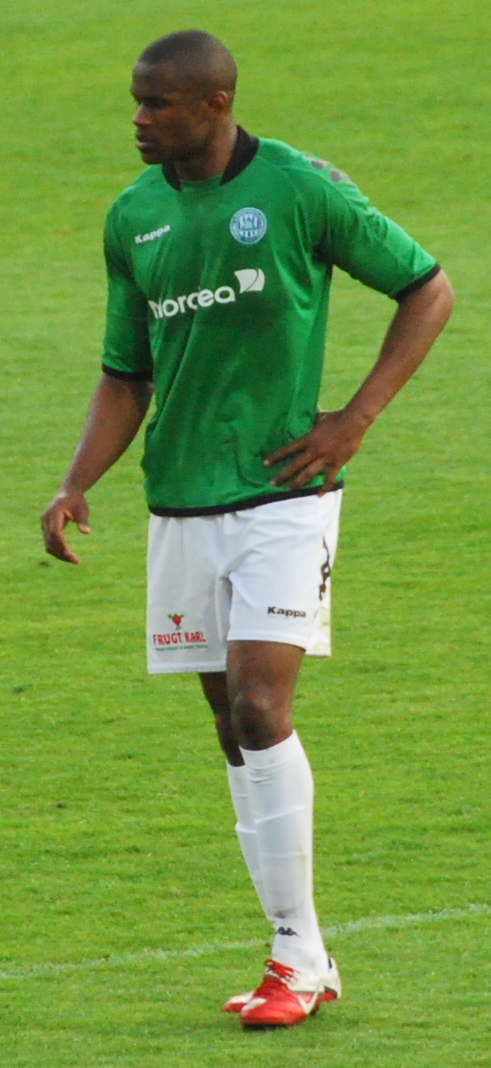

Personal information
- Date of birth: October 30, 1986 (age 40)
- Place of birth: Rochester, New York, U.S.
- Height: 6 ft 4 in (1.93 m)
- Position: Defender

Youth career
- 2005–2008: Santa Clara Broncos

Senior career*
Years	Team	Apps	(Gls)
2010–2012	Viborg FF	49	(6)
2012	New York Red Bulls	0	(0)
2013	Vendsyssel FF	12	(1)
2013–2016	Viborg FF	59	(2)
2016–2017	Hobro IK	32	(0)
- * Club domestic league appearances and goals

Babajide "Jide" Ogunbiyi (born October 30, 1986) is an American retired soccer player who played as a defender.

== Early life ==
Ogunbiyi was born in Rochester, New York to Lai, a pharmacologist from Nigeria, and Elaine Ogunbiyi, a biochemist from Jamaica. He is one of three children in his family; his younger brother Ayotunde played soccer at University of New Hampshire and Ocean City Barons in the USL Premier Development League (PDL) while his elder sister Temitayo, is an artist. Ogunbiyi attended Wissahickon High School in Ambler, Pennsylvania. While at high school he played basketball as a forward as well as soccer as a defender. In soccer he lettered three years and was team captain in his senior year. He attended the Pepsi Football Academy as a youth and was a three-time most valuable player.

== Career ==
=== College ===
Ogunbiyi attended Santa Clara University. During his time with the Broncos, he also played as a forward and scored 11 goals in 77 total appearances with the team. He played the Broncos' West Coast Conference championship-winning teams in 2006 and 2007.

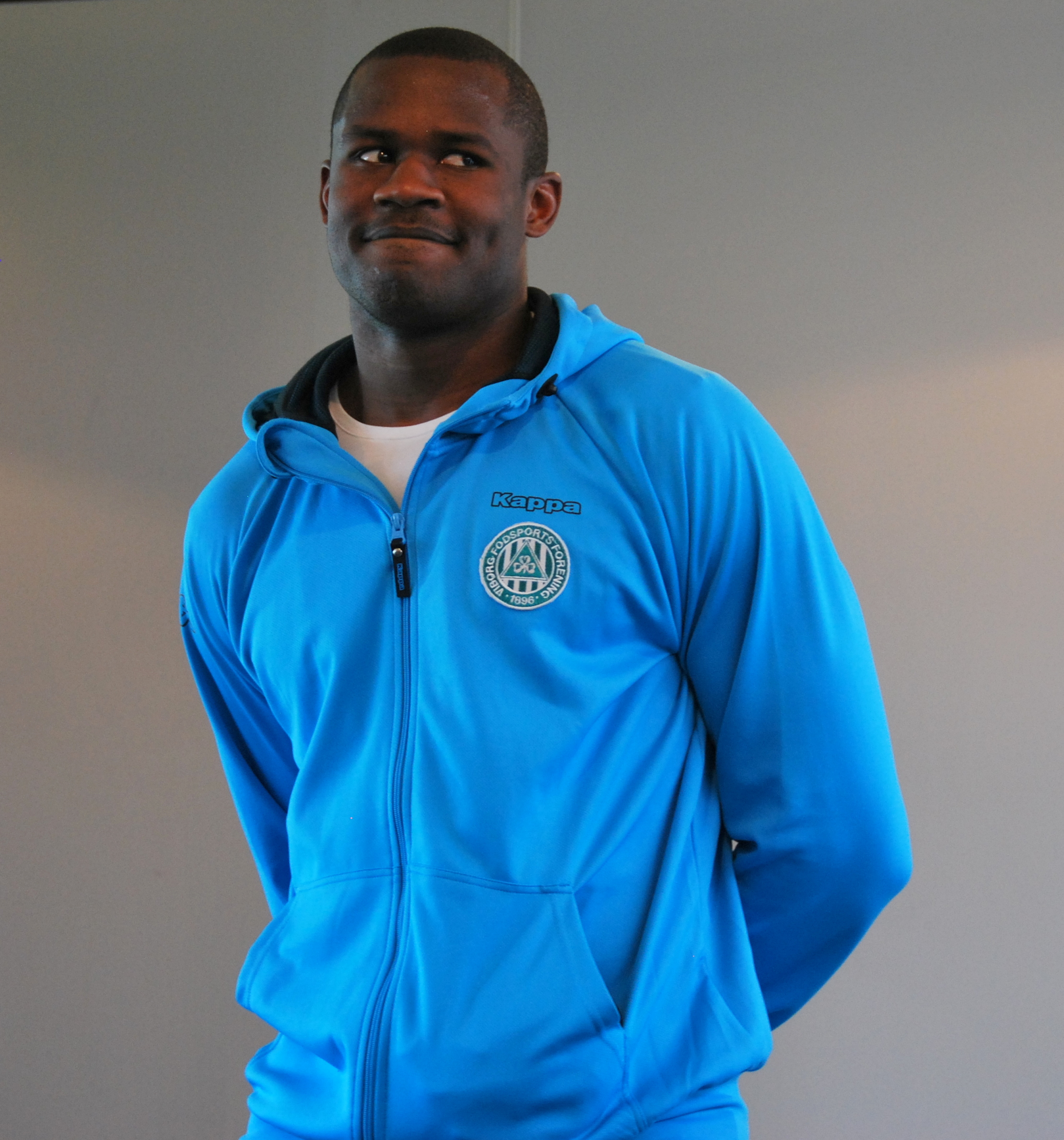
Ogunbiyi while with Viborg FF

=== Club ===
Ogunbiyi was drafted by the New York Red Bulls in the 2009 MLS SuperDraft. When he was drafted, New York officials cited his size - six foot, four inches and 212 pounds - as a potential asset. After refusing a developmental contract he and the club were unable to agree a deal. He chose to continue his senior year at college.

In April 2009, Ogunbiyi had an unsuccessful trial with English club Leeds United, later trialing with Oldham Athletic in July 2009.

In 2010, Ogunbiyi signed for Viborg FF of the Danish 1st Division. Babajide was spotted by Viborg great Steffen Højer while he was on trial with Odense Boldklub in a match against FC Fredericia. Højer was impressed by Babajide and offered him a trial with Viborg, this resulted in the defender signing his first professional contract with the club in August 2010. In June 2011 Babajide went on a three-day trial with German club Karlsruher SC, however the clubs were unable to agree on a transfer fee and he returned to Viborg. In two and a half seasons with Viborg Babajide appeared in 53 matches for the team in total, 52 league and one cup, scoring six goals. He had his best season for Viborg during the 2010–11 campaign in which he managed to score 5 goals in 28 league matches for the Danish side and was named as the club's player of the year. He was also named in the 1st Division team of the year for the 2010–11 season. While in Denmark, Ogunbiyi wrote a regular column for Goal.com focusing on his observations of living in Denmark as a foreigner.

Ogunbiyi signed a contract for the New York Red Bulls following a trial with the club in July 2012. However, weeks later, he was released for health reasons.

After playing in the Danish 1st Division with Vendsyssel FF for the latter part of the 2012–13 season, Ogunbiyi was re-acquired by Viborg in advance of the 2013–14 season. His contract was not renewed after its December 2015 expiration. He signed an 18-month deal with Danish Superliga club Hobro IK shortly after. He retired following the 2016–17 season, citing lingering injuries.

=== International ===
American-born to a Nigerian father, he was eligible for the United States and Nigeria. Although Ogunbiyi was part of the Nigerian national team youth setup, he never appeared in a match for either nation at any level.
