= Danilo Arrieta =

Danish footballer (born 1987)

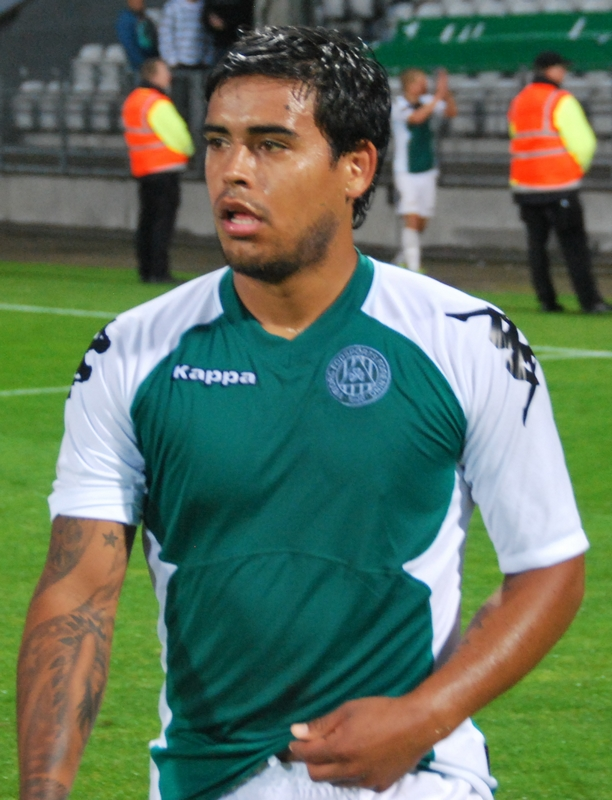
- Arrieta with Viborg FF in September 2012

Personal information
- Full name: Danilo Esteban Arrieta Cerda
- Date of birth: 10 February 1987 (age 39)
- Place of birth: Villa Alemana, Chile
- Height: 1.70 m (5 ft 7 in)
- Positions: Winger; forward

Youth career
- 1991–1997: Lystrup
- 1997–2002: AGF
- 2002–2004: Valencia

Senior career*
| Years | Team | Apps | (Gls) |
| 2002–2004 | Valencia B | 9 | (0) |
| 2004–2006 | AGF | 34 | (1) |
| 2006–2007 | Eldense | 33 | (9) |
| 2007 | Orihuela | 19 | (5) |
| 2008 | Vejle | 10 | (1) |
| 2009–2012 | Hobro | 74 | (58) |
| 2012–2015 | Viborg | 33 | (2) |
| 2015 | Skive | 14 | (5) |
| 2015–2017 | Lyngby | 24 | (3) |
| 2017 | Viborg | 11 | (1) |

International career
| 2003–2004 | Denmark U17 | 17 | (9) |
| 2004–2005 | Denmark U18 | 3 | (3) |
| 2005–2006 | Denmark U19 | 8 | (5) |
| 2006 | Denmark U20 | 2 | (0) |
- * Club domestic league appearances and goals as of 29 November 2017 (UTC)

Danilo Esteban Arrieta Cerda (born 10 February 1987) is a former footballer who played as a winger. Born in Chile, he represents Denmark at youth level.

== Career ==
=== Youth career ===
Arrieta started playing football at the age of 4. As a talented 10-year-old boy, Danilo moved to AGF Aarhus in 1997 and developed into one of the most promising talents in Danish football. His talent was rumoured widely and in 2002, at the age of only 15, he signed a contract with Spanish Valencia CF.

=== Valencia CF ===
He played 9 matches for the Valencia CF reserves with names like David Silva, Raul Albiol, Mohamed Sissoko and Jaime Gavilan. However, things didn't work out as expected when the reserves Valencia CF Mestalla suffered relegation to the Tercera División where young foreign talents were not allowed to play according to Spanish FA regulations. Arrieta revealed in May 2004, that he wanted to rejoin his former youth club AGF. 2 months later it was confirmed, that he would be leaving the club.

=== AGF ===
In September 2004, Arrieta got his playing license from DBU and signed a contract with AGF.

On 12 September 2004 (aged 17) he got his Danish Superliga debut for his childhood team AGF Aarhus in a home game against Viborg FF. Arrieta was on a trial at Xerez CD in May 2006 and in August 2006 at Logroñés CF. But once again things did not quite work out as he had hoped, he was granted a free transfer by AGF.

=== Vejle Boldklub ===
After 1 1/2 years in Spain, playing Segunda División B for CD Eldense and Orihuela CF, he finally returned to Denmark on 20 December 2007, and signed a 1/2-year contract with Vejle BK, which in 2008 was extended for another six months. He left Vejle BK in January 2009 after the end of his contract.

=== Hobro IK ===
On 17 February 2009 he signed a deal with Danish 2nd Division side Hobro IK, helping them to win promotion to the Danish 1st Division in his very first season at the club.

After 14 goals in his first season, he extended his contract and slowly became a regular part of the squad. Turkish club Samsunspor was very interested in Arrieta in January 2010, and went on a one-week trial at the club. However, he remained at the club. In the summer 2010 Hobro IK announced, they had received a bid from Arietta's former team AGF Aarhus. Hobro wanted to keep the offensive player, and he accepted that. He extended his contract in February 2011 until 2013. Arrieta was a very wanted and popular player, and had many interested clubs.

=== Viborg FF ===
In July 2014 it was confirmed, that Arrieta had signed a contract with Viborg FF valid from the new year, where his contract with Hobro expired. Arrieta won the Danish 1st Division with the club in his first season and was promoted to the Danish Superliga. In the 2013/14 season in Superligaen, he only got six games as a substituter. The playing time was not helped on the way after a bad injury in March 2014, where he damaged his knee and was out for the rest of the season. He went back from the injury in August 2014.

Arietta's contract was terminated in January 2015.

=== Skive IK ===
The same day as his contract with Viborg got terminated, he signed a 6-months contract with Skive IK. Arrieta had a good season in the Danish 1st Division with 5 goals in 14 games, and was sold.

=== Lyngby Boldklub ===
Arrieta joined Lyngby BK in the summer 2015.

He won the Danish 1st Division with Lyngby and was promoted to the Danish Superliga. He played 22 league games for the club in his first season, but after the club was promoted to Superligaen, he only played 3 matches for the club due to several injuries. Arrieta didn't extend his contract and left the club at the end of his contract in June 2017.

=== Return to Viborg FF ===
After two years away from the club, Arrieta returned to the club on 3 August 2017. After only a half year and 11 league games Viborg FF confirmed, that they would split parts for the new year. On 2 February 2018, Arrieta announced his retirement.

== Honours ==
Viborg

- Danish 1st Division: 2012–13

Individual

- Danish 2nd Division top scorer: 2009–10
