= Viborg Stadium =

Football stadium in Viborg, Denmark

Coordinates: 56°27′21″N 9°24′7″E

Energi Viborg Arena
- Viborg Stadion

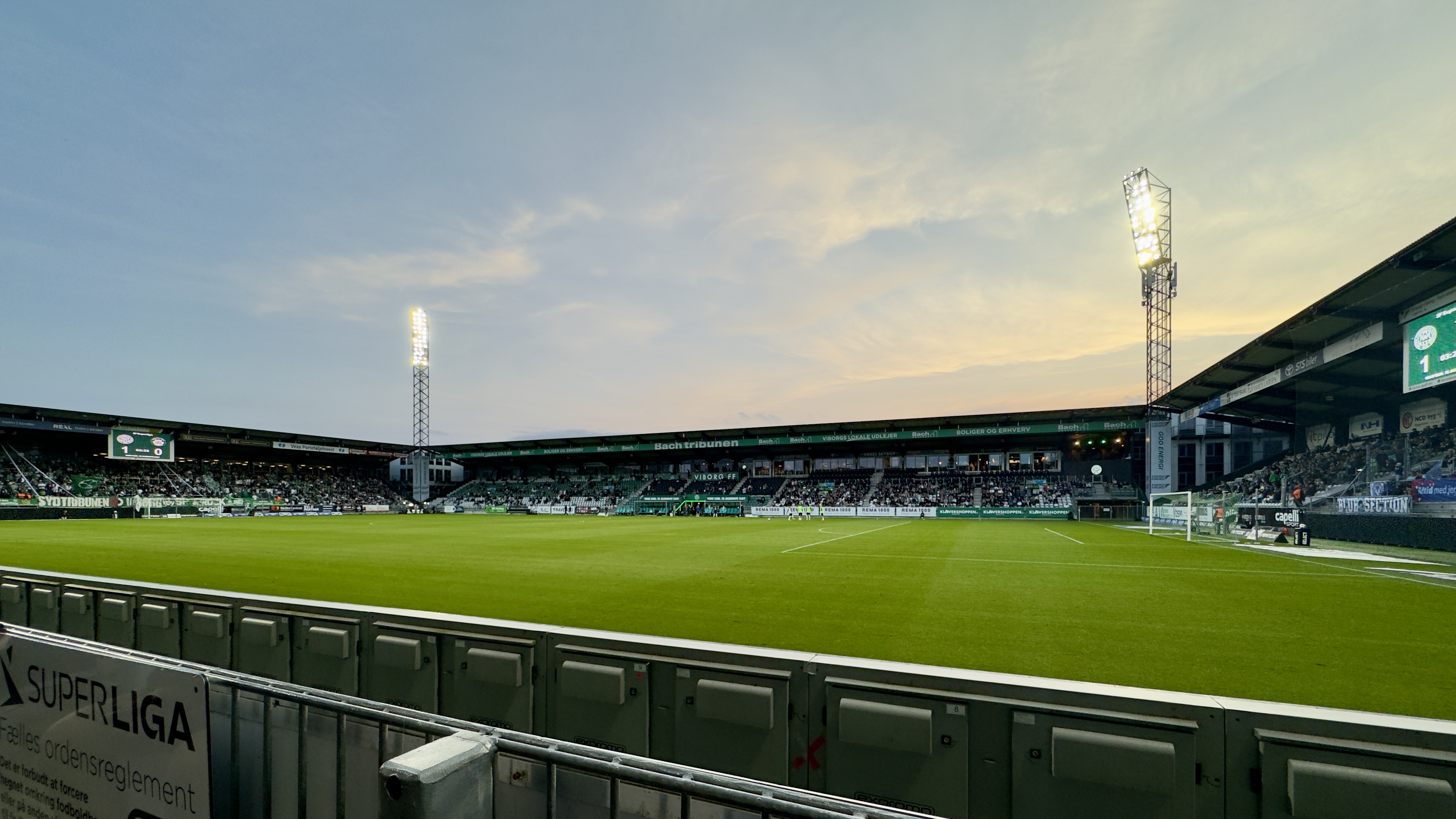
- Interactive map of Energi Viborg Arena
- Full name: Energi Viborg Arena
- Former names: Viborg Stadion (1931–2011); Energi Viborg Arena (2011–present)
- Address: Stadion Allé 7; 8800 Viborg; Denmark
- Owner: Viborg Municipality
- Operator: Viborg Stadion Center
- Capacity: 10,000 (9,566 seated)
- Record attendance: 18,000 (Denmark B v Sweden B, 21 October 1956)
- Field size: 105 by 68 metres (114.8 yd × 74.4 yd)

Construction
- Built: 1931
- Opened: 5 July 1931; 95 years ago
- Renovated: 2008; 2021
- Rebuilt: 2001–2007
- Years active: 1931–present
- Cost: 62.1 million kr. (2001) (96.4 million kr. in 2025)

Tenants
- Viborg FF (1931–present); Denmark women's national football team (2015–2024)

Viborg Stadium (Danish: Viborg Stadion), currently known as Energi Viborg Arena for sponsorship reasons, is the home of Danish Superliga club Viborg FF with a capacity of 10,000. Originally built in 1931, it previously hosted the Danish national women's football team between 2015 until 2024.

== History ==
Viborg Stadium was first opened in 1931. The stadium was previously owned by de Samvirkende Idrætsklubber, receiving a subsidy from Viborg Municipality to cover operating costs. In 1996, the municipality took ownership of the stadium. Between 1996 and 2001, the municipality spent more than 1 million kr. on renovating the stadium.

=== Reconstruction and upgrades ===
In 2001, the old stadium was demolished in order for a new stadium to be built in its place at a cost of 62.1 million kr. (96.4 million kr. in 2025). While the main stadium itself was completed by the following year, work continued until 2007 as standing sections were re-introduced to the stadium. With an overall capacity of 10,000 seats, only 9,566 are seated with the remainder being evenly split between both the home and away sides for standing room. In 2008, two large screens were also added to the stadium.

The stadium currently contains a heated pitch, as well as floodlights capable of providing 1200 lux.

== National team use ==
Previously, the stadium has also played host to the Danish men's B squad on 21 October 1956, when Denmark lost 4–0 to Sweden in front of 18,000 spectators. The stadium also hosted several matches throughout the 2011 UEFA European Under-21 Championship, hosting three matches for Group B as well as a semi-final match.

From 2015 until 2024, the Danish women's national team also regularly played at the stadium. When the agreement between the Danish Football Association and Viborg municipality expired in the summer of 2024, the women's team left and began using multiple venues within the country.

The men's senior national team played a friendly at the stadium on 8 June 2015, hosting the Montenegro national team. With 9,180 fans in attendance, Denmark won the match 2–1 with two goals in the second half.

== Concerts ==
On 15 June 2008, the stadium played host to its first concert as Dolly Parton played at the ground as part of her Backwoods Barbie Tour.

== Naming rights ==
The naming rights of the stadium were sold in October 2011 to Energi Viborg, an energy and water company. While the deal was subject to some criticism, it was later extended on several occasions. The current agreement runs until the end of 2027.
