= Jeff Mensah =

Danish footballer (born 1992)

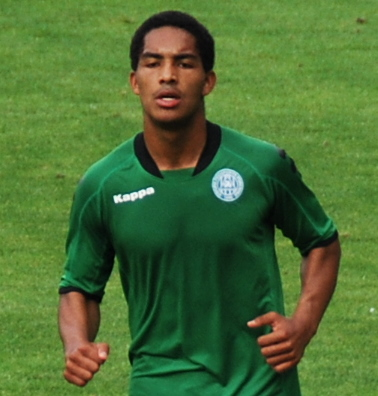
- Mensah with Viborg in 2011

Personal information
- Date of birth: 10 August 1992 (age 34)
- Place of birth: Viborg, Denmark
- Height: 1.78 m (5 ft 10 in)
- Position: Midfielder

Youth career
- 1998–2004: Viborg Søndermarken IK
- 2004–2009: Viborg

Senior career*
Years	Team	Apps	(Gls)
2009–2016	Viborg	96	(6)
2015	→ Skive (loan)	15	(0)
2016	Hødd	6	(0)
2017–2018	Thisted	23	(3)
2018–2022	Viborg	87	(11)
- * Club domestic league appearances and goals

Jeff Mensah (born 10 August 1992) is a Danish former professional footballer who played as a midfielder.

== Career ==
Born in Viborg, Mensah began his senior career with Viborg in the 2009–10 season. He joined Skive on loan in February 2015. He was released by Viborg in May 2016, at the end of his contract. He spent the second half of 2016 in Norway with Hødd. He returned to Denmark with Thisted in January 2017. He returned to Viborg for the 2018–19 season.

On 29 January 2022, 29-year old Mensah announced, that he had decided to retire from football.

== Personal life ==
Mensah is of Ghanaian descent. He is the brother of the footballer Kevin Mensah.

== Honours ==
Viborg

- Danish 1st Division: 2012–13, 2020–21
