= Jacob Egeris =

Danish footballer (born 1990)

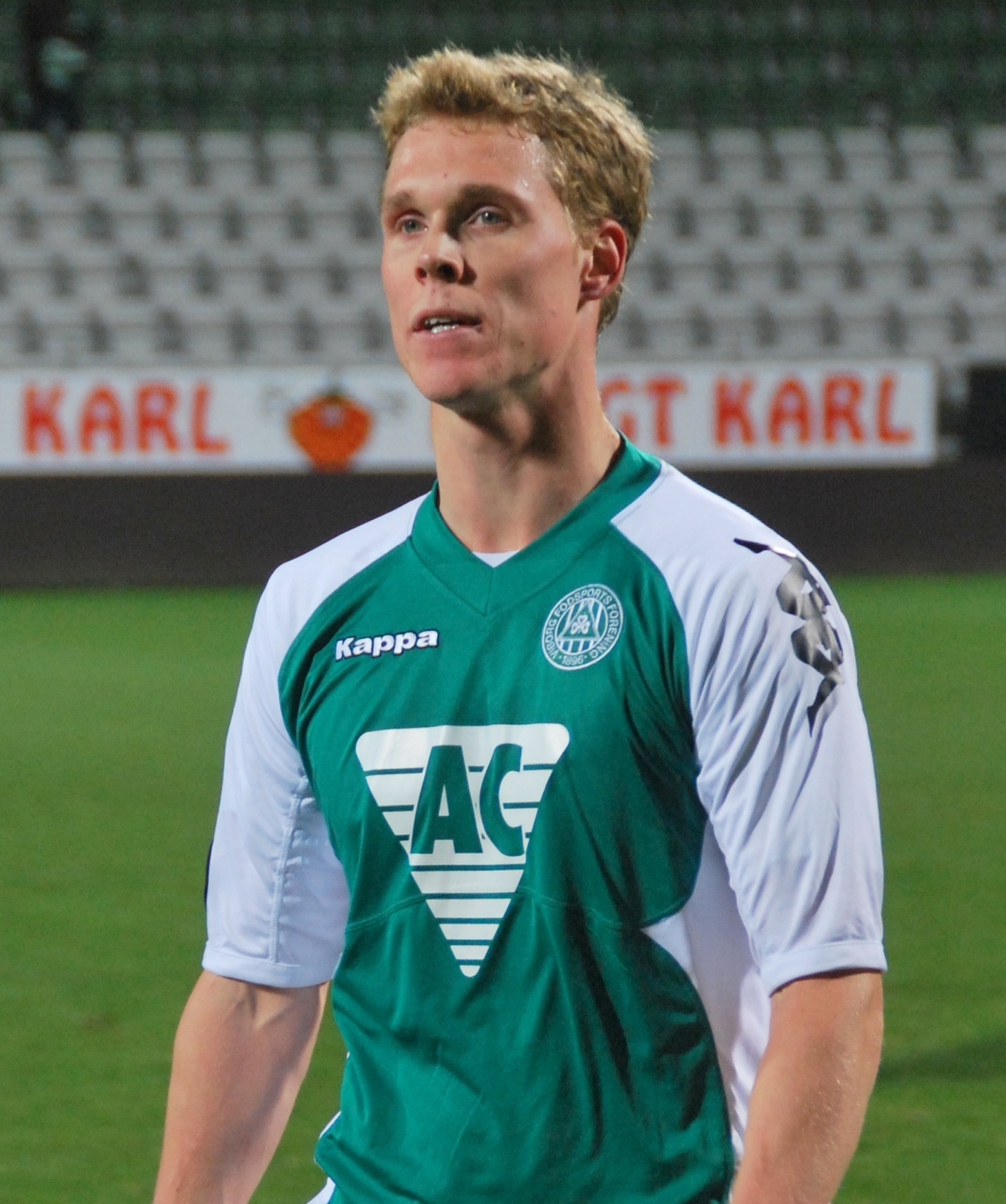
- Egeris in October 2012

Personal information
- Full name: Jacob Egeris Pedersen
- Date of birth: 19 May 1990 (age 36)
- Place of birth: Copenhagen, Denmark
- Height: 6 ft 1 in (1.85 m)
- Position: Centre-back

Youth career
- –2006: Søllerød-Vedbæk
- 2006–2009: Lyngby

Senior career*
Years	Team	Apps	(Gls)
2009–2010	Lyngby	24	(1)
2011–2013	Nordsjælland	5	(0)
2012–2013	→ Viborg (loan)	26	(3)
2013–2016	Viborg	54	(1)
2016–2017	Vejle	29	(1)
2017–2019	HamKam	46	(2)
2020–2022	Nykøbing	71	(5)
2023–2025	B.93	60	(2)
- * Club domestic league appearances and goals as of 29 May 2025

Jacob Egeris Pedersen (born 19 May 1990) is a Danish professional footballer plays as a centre-back.

== Early life ==
Egeris played football during his youth for BK Søllerød-Vedbæk, until he moved to Lyngby in December 2006. He spent 2 years in the Lyngby youth setup.

== Senior career ==
=== Lyngby Boldklub ===
Egeris got his debut on 20 September 2009, coming on as a substitute against Vejle Boldklub. He'd go on to make league appearances in his debut season in the 1st Division and was given a one-year contract extension in December 2009. Playing 22 games in his first season, Egeris helped Lyngby win promotion to the Danish Superliga, with a second place league finish.

In the second game of the 2010–11 season, Egeris was injured with damage to his ankle in a match with AC Horsens. He would be out injured until November, making an unexpected return filling in for Mathias Tauber who pulled out last minute because of illness, losing to Randers FC in a 3–0 defeat in the Danish Cup. He received a hostile reaction from the Lyngby supporters due to his contractual situation, choosing to follow the recent trend of former Lyngby players to leave on a free transfer to join neighboring rivals F.C. Nordsjælland, when his contract was set to expire in the winter.

=== F.C. Nordsjælland ===
Jacob Egeris joined FCN in January 2011, signing a three-year contract. Shortly after joining, Egeris re-injured himself in training which kept him out for the rest of the 2010–11 season. On 31 August 2011, it was confirmed by Egeris' agent that he was considering a move to Viborg after failing to break into the F.C. Nordsjælland squad due to injury set backs, after spending a year and a half with the Farum club. He eventually turned down a loan move to The Greens, deciding to stay with FCN to try and break into the first team.

On 24 November 2011, Egeris made his first team debut as a substitute in the 90th minute, in a 2–0 loss to F.C. Copenhagen, in the Danish Cup quarter finals. He would go on to make his league debut for the club a week later, as an 81st-minute substitute for Patrick Mtiliga, in a 0–0 draw with F.C. Midtjylland.

=== Nykøbing FC ===
After two years in Norway, joining HamKam in July 2017, Egeris returned to Denmark in February 2020 and signed with Nykøbing FC.

=== B.93 ===
On 30 January 2023, Egeris joined Danish 2nd Division club B.93. He left the club in June 2025.

== Career statistics ==
=== Club ===
As of 5 December 2011

Club	Season	League		Cup		Continental		Other		Total	
Club	Season	Apps	Goals	Apps	Goals	Apps	Goals	Apps	Goals	Apps	Goals
Lyngby	2009–10	22	1	0	0	0	0	0	0	22	1
Lyngby	2010–11	2	0	1	0	0	0	0	0	3	0
Lyngby	Total	24	1	1	0	0	0	0	0	25	1
F.C. Nordsjælland	2010–11	0	0	0	0	0	0	0	0	0	0
F.C. Nordsjælland	2011–12	5	0	1	0	0	0	0	0	6	0
F.C. Nordsjælland	Total	5	0	1	0	0	0	0	0	6	0
Career total		29	1	2	0	0	0	0	0	31	1

== Honours ==
Viborg

- Danish 1st Division: 2012–13, 2014–15
