= Simon Nagel =

Danish footballer (born 1985)

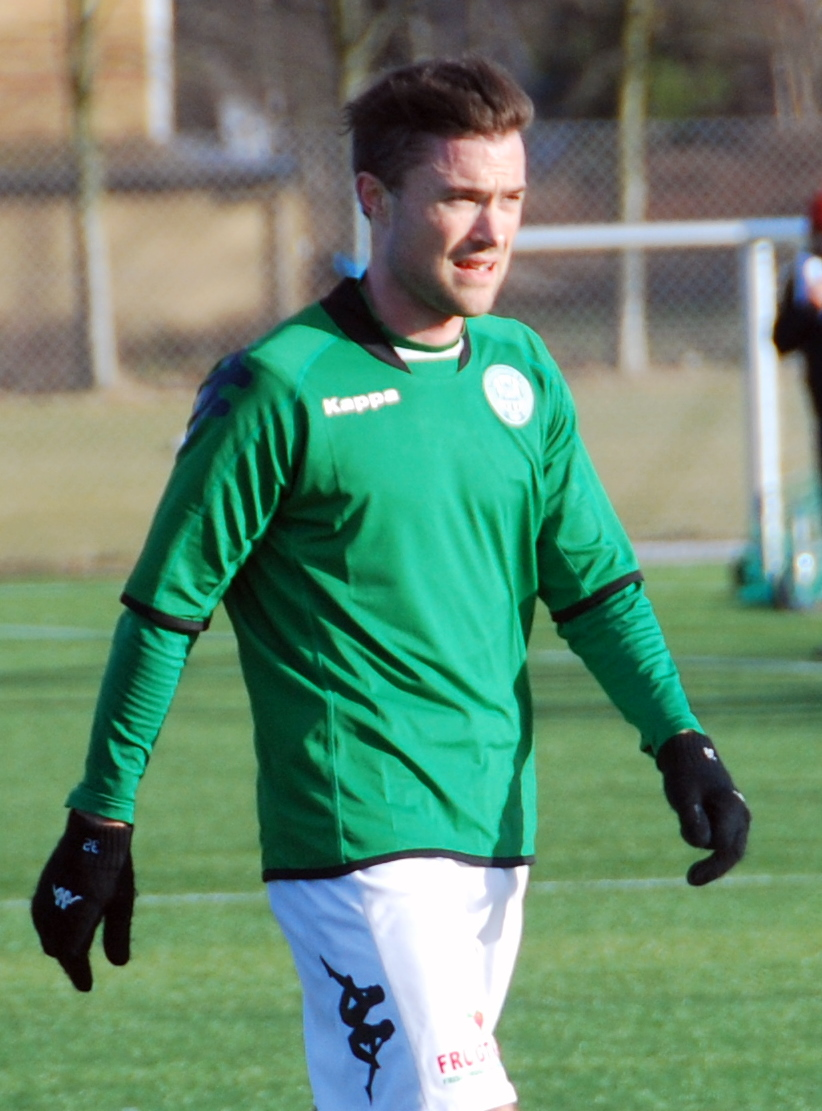

Personal information
- Date of birth: 5 July 1985 (age 41)
- Place of birth: Maribo, Denmark
- Height: 1.75 m (5 ft 9 in)
- Position: Midfielder

Senior career*
Years	Team	Apps	(Gls)
2004–2007	Silkeborg IF	83	(7)
2007–2008	Viborg FF	30	(2)
2008–2011	AC Horsens	46	(3)
2011	FC Hjørring	15	(2)
2012–2014	Viborg FF	65	(9)
2014–2017	Vejle Boldklub	68	(11)
2017	Kjellerup IF	8	(3)

International career
2005	Denmark U-20	2	(0)
2006	Denmark U-21	1	(0)
- * Club domestic league appearances and goals

Simon Nagel (born 5 July 1985) is a Danish retired professional football midfielder.

He joined Vejle Boldklub on 29 June 2014 from Viborg FF, but left again in the summer of 2017.
