= Nicholas Gotfredsen =

Danish footballer (born 1989)

Personal information
- Full name: Nicholas Gotfredsen
- Date of birth: 5 February 1989 (age 37)
- Place of birth: Brøndby Strand, Denmark
- Position: Defender

Team information
- Current team: Vigerslev BK
- Number: 66

Youth career
- Brøndby
- Nordsjælland
- HIK

Senior career*
Years	Team	Apps	(Gls)
2009–2011	Aarhus Fremad	50	(7)
2011–2013	AaB	5	(0)
2013–2016	Viborg	50	(0)
2015–2016	→ Fredericia (loan)	24	(6)
2016–2020	Hobro	63	(6)
2021–	Vigerslev BK		
- * Club domestic league appearances and goals

Nicholas Gotfredsen (born 5 February 1989) is a Danish footballer who plays as a defender for amateur club Vigerslev BK.
