= Sebastian Andersen =

Danish footballer (born 1988)

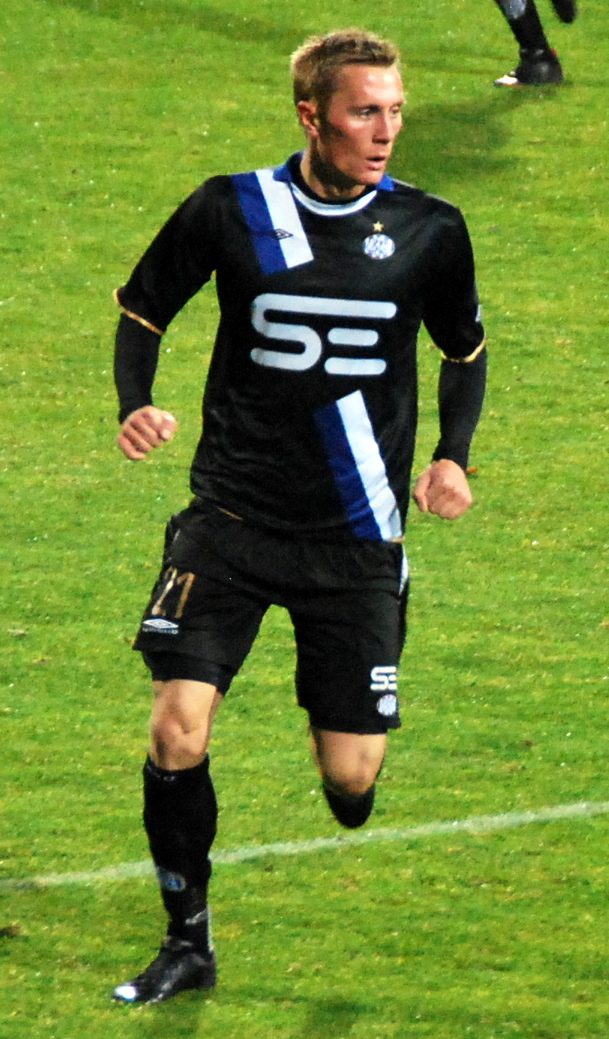
- Sebastian Andersen in October 2011.

Personal information
- Full name: Sebastian Lykke Andersen
- Date of birth: 23 December 1988 (age 37)
- Place of birth: Køge, Denmark
- Height: 1.86 m (6 ft 1 in)
- Position: Left midfielder

Senior career*
Years	Team	Apps	(Gls)
2006–2009	Herfølge	49	(7)
2009	HB Køge	16	(1)
2010–2013	Esbjerg fB	47	(1)
2011	→ AC Horsens (loan)	13	(0)
2013–2014	Viborg FF	4	(0)
2014	→ Hobro IK (loan)	0	(0)
2014	Hobro IK	12	(3)
2014–2016	Viborg FF	61	(9)
2016–2017	Hobro IK	23	(5)
2017–2019	Fremad Amager	14	(1)

International career
2008	Denmark U20	1	(0)
2009–2010	Denmark U21	4	(0)

Managerial career
- 2021: Solrød FC (assistant)
- * Club domestic league appearances and goals

Sebastian Lykke Andersen (born 23 December 1988) is a Danish retired professional association football player who played as a left midfielder.

== Club career ==
=== Herfølge BK ===
Andersen was promoted to the first team squad in 2006 and was named as the talent of the year in his club in 2007, where he also signed a new two-year contract with the club. The young midfielder had some good seasons at Herfølge, and was sold in 2009.

=== HB Køge ===
HB Køge signed the young talent in the summer 2009. He only played 16 league matches, before signing a contract with HB Køge in January 2010.

=== Esbjerg fB ===
On 13 January 2010 it was announced, that Andersen had signed a contract with Esbjerg fB valid from the summer 2010. Esbjerg wanted to sign him right away, and they managed to do it. On 2 February 2010 they announced, that he would transfer right away instead of the summer 2010. But due to the lack of playing time, he was loaned out to AC Horsens.

==== Loan to AC Horsens ====
AC Horsens signed Andersen on a loan deal on 31 January 2011 for the rest of the season.

==== Back to Esbjerg ====
After getting back from his loan stay, he slowly became a regular part of the team. Esbjerg got relegated to the Danish 1st Division. The relegation gave Andersen some more space in the squad and he played 25 games in his first season after his loan stay. Esbjerg got promoted to the Danish Superliga again in the next season, and Andersen was back on the bench. He played 28 games for the club, but 20 of them was as a substituter. Andersen didn't feel, that he had got the chance to show himself, and he wanted to leave the club.

=== Viborg FF ===
Andersen signed for Viborg FF on 3 September 2013. But the situation was the same at this club, as it was in Esbjerg.

==== Loan to Hobro IK ====
Andersen was loaned out to Hobro IK in January 2014.

=== Hobro IK ===
A month into his loan stay at Hobro, Viborg FF terminated his contract. The loan deal was therefore also cancelled and he signed a 6-months contract with Hobro the same day. After his arrival he said, that he thought he would get more time at Viborg and it probably was a mistake. He had a good half season in the club with 12 matches and 4 goals, before leaving the club at the end of his contract.

=== Viborg FF ===
Andersen returned surprisingly to Viborg on 28 June 2014. He was reunited with his former manager from HB Køge, Auri Skarbalius. He played 61 league matches for the club before leaving in the summer 2016, when his contract expired. He later revealed, that he and the club had some different wishes, and they couldn't continue together.

=== Hobro IK ===
Andersen began training with Norwegian club, IK Start, after he left Viborg FF. One week later, he signed with Hobro IK. In the same season, Hobro was promoted to the Danish Superliga again, however, Andersen didn't want to continue at the club.

=== Fremad Amager ===
On 30 May 2017 it was confirmed, that Andersen had joined Danish 1st Division club, Fremad Amager, on a free transfer. Andersen retired at the end of the 2018/19 season where he didn't play a single game due to a knee injury.

== Coaching career ==
After retiring, Andersen was appointed assistant coach at Solrød FC in March 2021. In July 2021, he confirmed that he had left the club again, as he had got a new job as private insurer.

== Honours ==
Esbjerg fB

- Danish Cup: 2012–13
