= Thomas Dalgaard =

Danish footballer (born 1984)

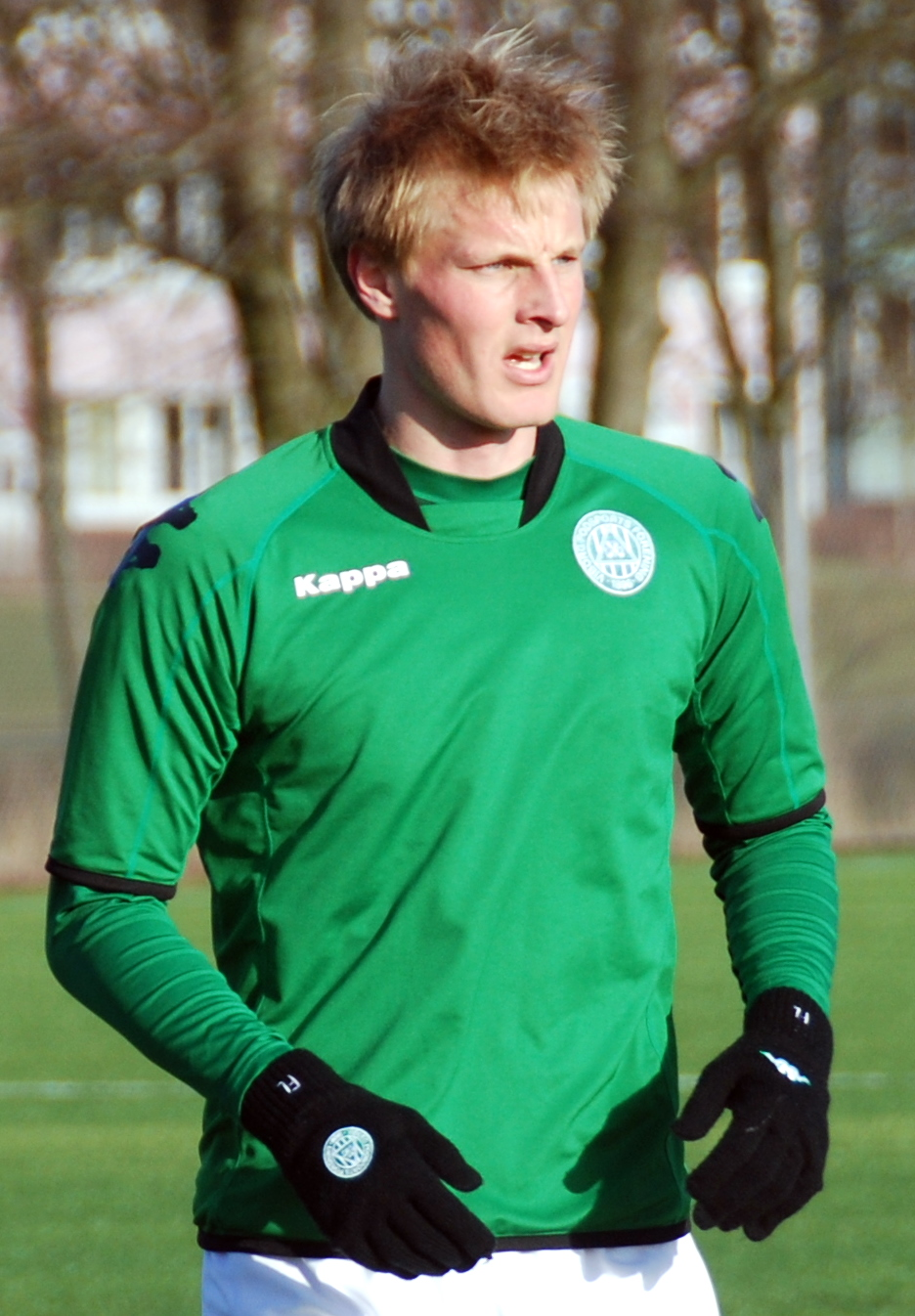
- Dalgaard with Viborg FF in 2012

Personal information
- Date of birth: 13 April 1984 (age 42)
- Place of birth: Nykøbing Mors, Denmark
- Height: 1.88 m (6 ft 2 in)
- Position: Forward

Youth career
- 2001–2003: Nykøbing Mors IF
- 2003–2005: Silkeborg

Senior career*
Years	Team	Apps	(Gls)
2005–2006	Skive	41	(42)
2006–2007	Randers	31	(10)
2008	Manisaspor	2	(0)
2008–2011	Skive	84	(40)
2012–2014	Viborg	74	(50)
2014–2015	Heerenveen	10	(0)
2015	→ OB (loan)	9	(1)
2015–2016	SønderjyskE	21	(5)
2016–2017	Vendsyssel	27	(12)
2017–2018	Skive	31	(9)
2018–2020	Silkeborg KFUM		
2020	VSK Aarhus	1	(0)
2020–2021	Skive IK	12	(2)
Total		343	(171)
- * Club domestic league appearances and goals

Thomas Dalgaard (born 13 April 1984) is a former professional footballer who played as a forward.

== Career ==
Dalgaard began to play football in 2001 in the youth side for Nykøbing Mors IF before joining Silkeborg IF in summer 2003 .

Dalgaard began his professional career with Skive IK. In summer 2006 he joined Randers FC, where he scored 10 goals in 31 Danish Superliga matches.

In January 2008 he left Denmark to sign with Turkish Süper Lig side Manisaspor. He only played two games for Manisaspor and was released in August after the club was relegated.

On 27 August 2008, he returned to Skive IK, and extended his contract with his youth club on 14 April 2009.

On 31 July 2014, after having played two seasons for Viborg FF, Dalgaard signed a three-year deal with Dutch Eredivisie side SC Heerenveen. After six disappointing months, without a single goal for Heerenveen, Dalgaard returned to Denmark once more, signing with OB on loan in February 2015.

He played for Silkeborg KFUM between 2018 and 2020. In January 2020, he moved to VSK Aarhus in the Danish third tier.

After the season, Dalgaard announced his retirement from football as a result of uncertainty surrounding the COVID-19 pandemic. However, Dalgaard later announced that he would continue to play for Skive IK's second team in the Jutland Series. Dalgaard also revealed, that he would be available for the first team in the Danish 1st Division, but that it wasn't his plan to play for them, unless it was necessary. In November and December, Dalgaard was used in two games for the club's Danish 1st Division team and in January 2021 it was confirmed, that he had been training continuously with the first team. Later in January 2021, he also appeared in the first team squad on the club's website with shirt number 55.

On 14 May 2021, Skive confirmed, that Dalgaard would leave the club and retire at the end of the season.

== Career statistics ==
As of match played 26 November 2017

Appearances and goals by club, season and competition
Club	Season	League			Cup		Other		Total	
Club	Season	Division	Apps	Goals	Apps	Goals	Apps	Goals	Apps	Goals
Randers FC	2006–07	Superliga	16	3	0	0	—		16	3
Randers FC	2007–08	Superliga	15	7	0	0	—		15	7
Randers FC	Total		31	10	0	0	—		31	10
Manisaspor	2007–08	Süper Lig	2	0	0	0	—		2	0
Skive IK	2008–09	1. Division	25	12	2	2	—		27	14
Skive IK	2009–10	1. Division	27	12	0	0	—		27	12
Skive IK	2010–11	1. Division	25	12	0	0	—		25	12
Skive IK	2011–12	1. Division	7	4	0	0	—		7	4
Skive IK	Total		84	40	2	2	—		86	42
Viborg FF	2011–12	1. Division	9	5	0	0	—		9	5
Viborg FF	2012–13	1. Division	32	27	0	0	—		32	27
Viborg FF	2013–14	Superliga	33	18	1	0	—		34	18
Viborg FF	Total		74	50	1	0	—		75	50
Heerenveen	2014–15	Eredivisie	10	0	1	0	—		11	0
OB (loan)	2014–15	Superliga	9	1	0	0	—		9	1
SønderjyskE	2015–16	Superliga	21	5	2	0	0	0	23	5
Vendsyssel	2016–17	1. Division	27	12	2	0	1 (Note: Appearance in the 1. Division play-offs)	0	30	12
Skive IK	2017–18	1. Division	19	9	0	0	—		19	9
Career total			277	127	8	2	1	0	286	129
