= David Boysen =

Danish footballer (born 1991)

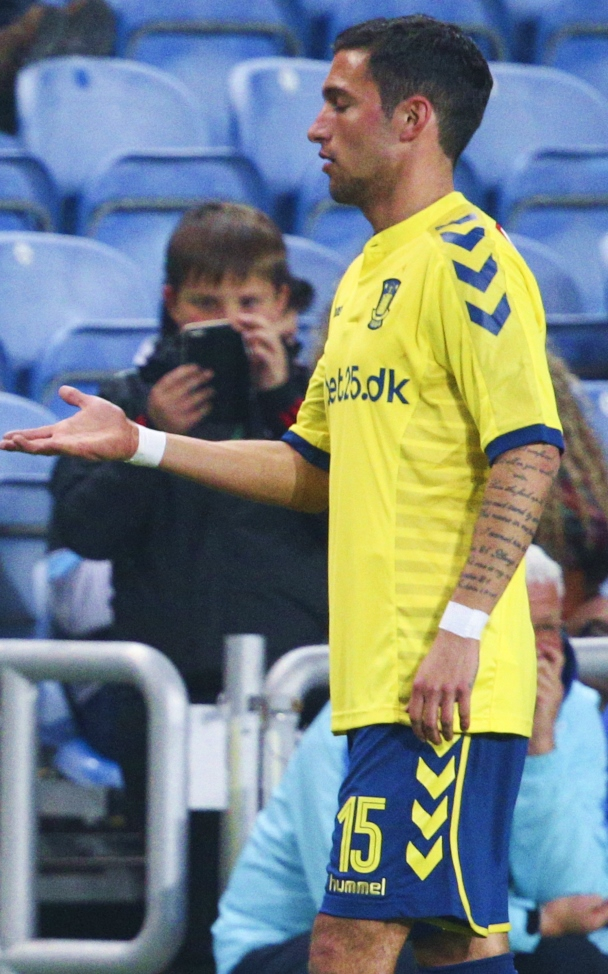
- Boysen with Brøndby IF in 2016

Personal information
- Full name: David Katz Boysen
- Date of birth: 30 April 1991 (age 35)
- Place of birth: Herlev, Denmark
- Height: 1.79 m (5 ft 10 in)
- Position: Winger

Team information
- Current team: Fremad Amager (sporting director)

Youth career
- Herlev IF
- AB

Senior career*
Years	Team	Apps	(Gls)
2006–2011	AB	57	(13)
2011–2014	Lyngby	75	(11)
2014	Viborg	8	(0)
2014–2016	Lyngby	42	(23)
2016	Brøndby	14	(3)
2016–2017	Roda JC Kerkrade	13	(1)
2017	Lyngby	28	(6)
2018	Beitar Jerusalem	4	(0)
2018–2019	IF Elfsborg	3	(0)
2019	Helsingborgs IF	7	(1)
2019–2020	Sektzia Ness Ziona	5	(1)
2020	Hapoel Nof HaGalil	6	(1)
2020–2021	Helsingør	29	(1)
2021–2023	Fremad Amager	47	(1)
2023	Brønshøj	7	(1)
Total		345	(63)

International career
2007	Denmark U16	2	(1)
2007–2008	Denmark U17	16	(1)
2008–2010	Denmark U19	23	(2)
2010–2011	Denmark U20	4	(1)

Managerial career
- 2025–: Fremad Amager (sporting director)
- * Club domestic league appearances and goals

David Katz Boysen (born 30 April 1991) is a Danish former professional footballer who played as a winger. He is currently the sporting director of Fremad Amager.

== Career ==
=== AB ===
Boysen joined AB as a youth player from Herlev IF. He was invited on a trial at Italian club Reggina in December 2007 at the age of 16. Boysen was also on trials at Premier League clubs Liverpool and Chelsea. In February 2008, Boysen signed his first contract with AB until the summer of 2011. He was promoted to the first team in the summer of 2008. He was considered a promising talent and made his debut at the age of 17 in a match against Kolding FC in the Danish 1st Division, where he replaced Henrik Lyngsoe Olsen in the 85th minute on 10 August 2008. He scored his first senior goal in his third game for the first team against FC Roskilde in the Danish Cup on 24 August 2008. Boysen was nominated for "Talent of the Year" 2008 by the Danish Football Association. Boysen made 24 league appearances and scored 8 goals in his first season despite his young age, and was shown interest by clubs from both the Netherlands and Germany.

After a one-week trial at Celtic in January 2010, he was linked with a move to the Scottish club. He played a friendly match for Celtic, and scored after five minutes. However, his agent later revealed that Boysen was not in top shape due to the winter break in Denmark, and therefore the club did not offer him a contract.

After a strong first half to the 2010–11 season, with 16 league appearances, 4 goals and 4 assists, he signed with Lyngby Boldklub. He played a total of 63 games for the first team.

=== Lyngby ===
Lyngby announced on 31 January 2011 that they had signed Boysen from AB on a contract valid from the summer 2011. The following day, however, Lyngby confirmed that Boysen instead would join the club with immediate effect. He made his first appearance for Lyngby on 14 March 2011 against OB, in a game which Lyngby lost 0–2. He scored his first goal for the club in his second game, a match against AaB.

In 2012, Israeli club Hapoel Tel Aviv attempted to bring Boysen and Swiss defender, Guillaume Katz, in on loan as the club was trying to strengthen their squad targeting Jewish footballers. He went on a trial at the club but decided to stay at Lyngby.

After three good seasons at Lyngby, Boysen was followed by Danish Superliga clubs. According to some media, Boysen was in negotiations with Esbjerg fB. Lyngby offered him a contract extension, but he rejected it and announced on 8 January 2014, that he would be leaving the club immediately.

=== Viborg ===
Boysen signed with Viborg FF on 13 January 2014 on a free transfer. He played his first game for the club on 23 February against Randers FC. It was head coach Ove Christensen that wanted to transfer Boysen to Viborg, but after Ove Christensen left the club and was replaced by Auri Skarbalius, Boysen found it hard to become a regular part of the squad, after he played 7 games from start and one from the bench, without scoring any goals. After a disappointing first half season, he left the club.

=== Return to Lyngby ===
Lyngby announced on 27 June 2014, that they had signed Boysen back on a two-year contract. Boysen's first season back at Lyngby, was an extraordinary season. He was named as the profile of the year in the Danish 1st Division after only six months in the league. He scored 12 goals in 24 league games before getting injured for the rest of the season in May 2015.

In the next season, he became the profile of the year in the Danish 1st Division once again. With 18 league games and 11 goals, he was sold in January 2016.

=== Brøndby ===
Boysen signed with Brøndby IF on 25 January 2016 and was reunited with his former manager from Viborg FF, Auri Skarbalius. He made his debut for Brøndby on 28 February against Hobro IK. Boysen played well during the spring, which aroused interest from foreign clubs.

=== Roda JC ===
On 8 July 2016 after only six months in Brøndby IF, Boysen was sold to Dutch club Roda JC. In December 2016 Boysen revealed, that he wasn't happy at the club due to the team's results which affected his stay in the Netherlands.

After 13 league games and 1 goal, Boysen's contract was terminated.

=== Third period at Lyngby ===
Despite the interest from Beitar Jerusalem and Hammarby IF, Boysen signed for Lyngby for the third time in February 2017. After his transfer to Lyngby he revealed that he had rejected foreign clubs that offered him millions in sign fee.

=== Journeyman years ===
On 7 December 2017, he signed with Israeli Premier League club Beitar Jerusalem. On 8 January 2018, he made his debut for the team in a 2–0 victory over Hapoel Haifa. In total, he appeared in seven games in all competitions for Beitar Jerusalem, before being released at the end of the 2017–18 season. On 11 August 2018, Boysen moved to IF Elfsborg in Allsvenskan, Sweden's first tier, on a one-and-a-half-year contract. Boysen's contract was terminated on 31 January 2019. On 15 February 2019, Helsingborgs IF announced the signing of Boysen on a free transfer for two year with an option to extend the deal with further one year.

On 11 September 2019, Boysen returned to Israel and signed with Sektzia Ness Ziona He was released from the club on 7 January 2020 after appearing in only 140 minutes spread over five league games, in which he scored one goal. On 29 January 2020, Boysen signed with Israeli Liga Leumit club Hapoel Nof HaGalil, his sixth club in only 25 months. He made his debut for the club on 31 January in a 1–1 away draw against Hapoel Ramat Gan Givatayim where he appeared as a starter. He scored his first goal for Hapoel Nof HaGalil on 21 February against Hapoel Afula in a 3–2 away loss for the team. Boysen left the club in July 2020, after a period which he described as "complete chaos", claiming that he only received 30% of his salary.

=== Helsingør ===
Boysen returned to Denmark in August 2020, signing with newly promoted Danish 1st Division club FC Helsingør. The move marked his thirteenth club in nine years. He made his debut for the club on 2 September 2020 in a Danish Cup match against sixth-tier Series 1 club Bispebjerg Boldklub, which ended in a shocking 3–2 loss. Boysen made his league debut on 9 September in a 4–2 home game against Silkeborg, coming on as a substitute in the 85h minute.

=== Fremad Amager ===
On 16 June 2021 Fremad Amager confirmed, that Boysen had signed a two-year deal with the club. In July 2023, a year before the original contract expiration, Boysen confirmed that his contract had been terminated.

In September 2023, Boysen joined Brønshøj Boldklub.

== Post-retirement ==
In November 2025, it was confirmed that Boysen had become part of the new ownership group at Fremad Amager, and that he had also been appointed as the club's new sporting director.

== Personal life ==
Boysen's father is from Israel.

== See also ==
- List of Jews in Sports
