= Christopher Poulsen =

Danish footballer (born 1981)

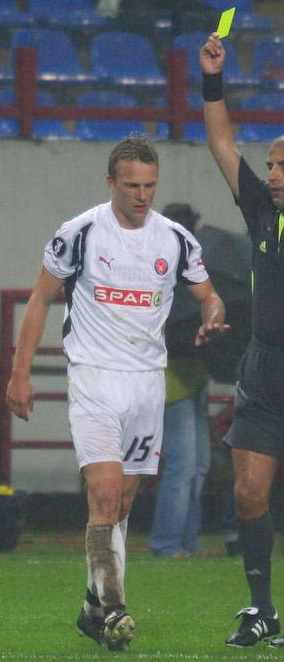

Personal information
- Full name: Christopher Fangel Poulsen
- Date of birth: 11 September 1981 (age 45)
- Place of birth: Hjørring, Denmark
- Height: 1.84 m (6 ft 1/2 in)
- Position: Defender

Team information
- Current team: Lemming IF (Manager)

Youth career
- Bindslev-Tversted
- Hjørring
- Silkeborg

Senior career*
Years	Team	Apps	(Gls)
2002–2005	Silkeborg	86	(5)
2005–2007	Viborg	56	(3)
2007–2009	Midtjylland	60	(1)
2010–2013	Silkeborg	95	(3)
2013–2016	Viborg	72	(2)
2016–2018	Silkeborg KFUM		
2020–2021	Bording IF		

International career
2002	Denmark U-21	1	(0)
2008	Denmark	2	(0)

Managerial career
- 2016–2018: Silkeborg KFUM (player-assistant)
- 2018–2020: Højslev St. IF
- 2020–2021: Bording IF (player-assistant)
- 2022–: Lemming IF
- * Club domestic league appearances and goals

Christopher Poulsen (born 11 September 1981) is a Danish retired professional football player who plays as defender and current manager of Lemming IF. He previously played for Superliga clubs Silkeborg IF and FC Midtjylland.

== Playing career ==
Poulsen played one game for the Denmark national under-21 football team in November 2002. He was called up for the Denmark League XI national football team by national team manager Morten Olsen in January 2007, and took part in two unofficial national team games during the team's tour of the United States, El Salvador, and Honduras. He made his senior Denmark national football team debut in an August 2008 friendly match against Spain, coming on as a substitute. He started his second national team game in September 2008, and played the entire game as Denmark drew Hungary 0–0 in the 2010 FIFA World Cup qualification tournament.

On April 16, 2013 Silkeborg IF announced that they had terminated Christopher Poulsen's contract one year early due to "disagreements over nonsporting issues" In June 2013, he rejoined his former club Viborg FF.

In July 2016, Poulsen retired from professional football, instead opting to continue as a player-assistant coach for Silkeborg KFUM competing in the Series 1, the sixth highest level of Danish football.

== Managerial career ==
On 22 November 2018, Højslev St. IF, competing in the sixth highest division, announced that Poulsen had been appointed as their new head coach. He was sacked in January 2020.

In July 2020 it was confirmed, that Poulsen had signed as a playing assistant coach with Danish amateur club Bording IF, under his former Silkeborg KFUM-manager, Lars Dahl. In March 2022, Poulsen was appointed manager of Jutland Series club Lemming IF.
