= Kevin Mensah (footballer) =

Danish footballer (born 1991)

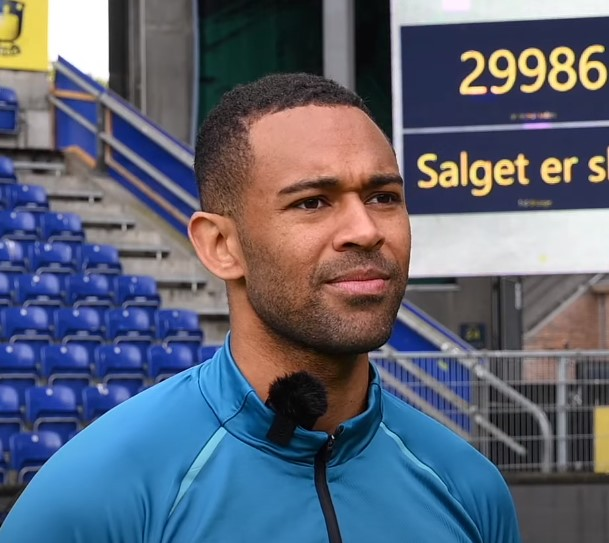
- Mensah in 2020

Personal information
- Full name: Kevin Niclas Mensah
- Date of birth: 15 May 1991 (age 35)
- Place of birth: Viborg, Denmark
- Height: 1.74 m (5 ft 9 in)
- Positions: Full-back; forward

Team information
- Current team: Brøndby (individual development coach)

Youth career
- 1998–2003: Viborg Søndermarken IK
- 2003–2008: FK Viborg

Senior career*
Years	Team	Apps	(Gls)
2008–2015	Viborg FF	110	(20)
2015–2017	Esbjerg fB	38	(8)
2017–2024	Brøndby	126	(5)
Total		274	(33)

International career
2007	Denmark U16	2	(0)
2007–2008	Denmark U17	12	(1)
2008–2009	Denmark U18	4	(2)
2009	Denmark U19	5	(1)
2010	Denmark U20	3	(0)
- * Club domestic league appearances and goals

Kevin Niclas Mensah (born 15 May 1991) is a Danish former professional footballer who works as an individual development coach at Brøndby IF.

Mensah began his senior career as a forward at Viborg FF in 2008. He joined Esbjerg fB in 2015 and moved to Brøndby in January 2017, where he played until December 2024. At Brøndby he converted from forward to full-back and made 156 first-team appearances. He was named vice-captain in 2019 and club captain in 2023, and won the Danish Cup in 2017–18 and the Danish Superliga in 2020–21.

At international level, Mensah earned 26 youth caps for Denmark across the under-16 to under-20 age groups, scoring four goals. He retired from playing in July 2025 and joined Brøndby's coaching staff.

== Career ==
=== Viborg FF ===
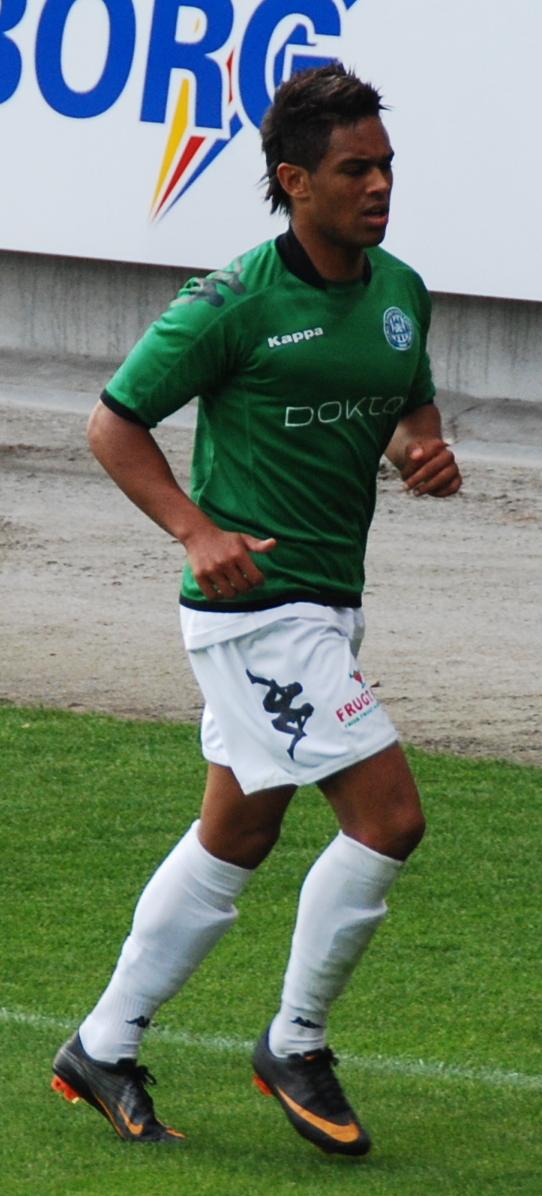
Mensah with Viborg in 2011

Mensah played his first years of youth football for Søndermarkens IK in his hometown Viborg. When he was 15 he signed with Viborg FF after being part of talent project FK Viborg.

In 2008, he trained regularly with the Danish Superliga squad for Viborg FF, and on 2 May 2009, at 17 years of age, he scored his first goal for the team, in a 2–0 win over Thisted FC in the Danish second tier. The day before his 18th birthday, he was permanently promoted to the first team. He had previously been on trial at Premier League clubs Arsenal and Newcastle United for several laps despite his young age.

On 30 June 2011, his contract with Viborg FF expired, and a few days before he went on a trial with FC Nordsjælland without this materialising in a contract offer. Therefore, Mensah returned to Viborg FF to keep his physical shape straight together with former teammates. When he still had not received any offers from clubs at the beginning of the next season, he started playing as an amateur for Viborg FF. In August 2011, the club offered him a new professional contract, which meant that he signed a two-year deal with the Viborg FF in October 2011.

After Viborg FF reached promotion to the Superliga in 2013, Mensah signed another two-year contract extension keeping him in his hometown club until 30 June 2015.

=== Esbjerg fB ===
On 2 February 2015 Esbjerg fB signed Mensah. Originally, he would transfer to Esbjerg in the summer of 2015. However, Viborg and Esbjerg reached an agreement on a transfer on the last day of the January transfer window, as Viborg had found a replacement for him in the meantime.

On 2 March 2015, Mensah made his debut for Esbjerg in a Danish Superliga match against AaB, coming in as a 72nd-minute substitute for Mohammed Fellah.

=== Brøndby ===
On 23 January 2017, Brøndby confirmed that they had reached an agreement with Esbjerg for the transfer of Mensah. He signed a three-and-a-half-year contract with the club. Due to a groin injury, he made his debut months later on 10 April 2017, coming off the bench for Kamil Wilczek in the 74th minute during a 1–0 loss to Copenhagen in a derby at Brøndby Stadium. He scored his first goal for the club on 7 May in a 4–2 away loss to Midtjylland.

In the final match of the 2017–18 season, Mensah tore his anterior cruciate ligament, requiring knee surgery that sidelined him for seven to nine months.

After making his return in February 2019, and following the departure of right-back Johan Larsson to Guingamp, Brøndby head coach Alexander Zorniger opted to move Mensah to right back to accommodate the shortage of backs in the squad, which meant that he would serve as the backup to Jens Martin Gammelby. Due to Anthony Jung's poor form at left back, Mensah was utilised in this position too in the 2018–19 season with great success.

In July 2019, he was appointed new vice-captain of the club.

On 6 March 2022, Mensah tore his anterior cruciate ligament once again in a league match against Silkeborg, and was expected to be sidelined for a year.

After Andreas Maxsø's departure in January 2023, Mensah was appointed Brøndby's captain by new head coach Jesper Sørensen. He made his comeback on 10 April 2023, 13 months after suffering the knee injury, replacing Blas Riveros in the 64th minute of a 2–1 loss to Nordsjælland. In June 2023, Mensah extended his contract with Brøndby until 31 December 2024.

On 10 December 2024, Brøndby announced that Mensah's contract would not be renewed, confirming his departure upon its expiration on 31 December. In July 2025, his retirement was confirmed as he accepted a coaching position with Brøndby.

== Coaching career ==
Mensah's playing contract with Brøndby expired in December 2024, and he spent six months without a new club. On 4 July 2025, he announced his retirement as a player and was appointed to the Brøndby coaching staff under head coach Frederik Birk, with responsibility for individual player development in the first-team squad. Football director Benjamin Schmedes cited Mensah's leadership qualities and knowledge of the club's culture as reasons for the appointment, describing him as a kulturbærer (culture bearer) of Brøndby. Mensah described the move as a natural step that allowed him to remain at the club in a different capacity.

== Personal life ==
His brother Jeff Mensah, also a professional footballer, retired in 2022. Kevin Mensah holds both Ghanaian and Danish passports.

Mensah has pursued education alongside his playing career. During his time at Esbjerg fB he completed his upper-secondary studies online while playing in the Danish Superliga, and at Brøndby he enrolled in a bachelor's programme at Erhvervsakademi Aarhus. He told FIFPRO in 2021 that his recurring injuries had prompted him to broaden his skill set, and that the Danish players' union Spillerforeningen had supported him in pursuing further education.

== Career statistics ==
Appearances and goals by club, season and competition
Club	Season	League			Danish Cup		Europe		Other		Total	
Club	Season	Division	Apps	Goals	Apps	Goals	Apps	Goals	Apps	Goals	Apps	Goals
Viborg	2008–09	Danish 1st Division	9	1	0	0	—		—		9	1
Viborg	2009–10	Danish 1st Division	18	2	1	0	—		—		19	2
Viborg	2010–11	Danish 1st Division	22	3	0	0	—		—		22	3
Viborg	2011–12	Danish 1st Division	13	2	2	1	—		—		15	3
Viborg	2012–13	Danish 1st Division	15	3	0	0	—		—		15	3
Viborg	2013–14	Danish Superliga	29	8	2	0	—		—		31	8
Viborg	2014–15	Danish 1st Division	4	1	0	0	—		—		4	1
Viborg	Total		110	20	5	1	—		—		115	21
Esbjerg fB	2014–15	Danish Superliga	9	1	2	2	—		—		11	3
Esbjerg fB	2015–16	Danish Superliga	16	6	1	1	—		—		17	7
Esbjerg fB	2016–17	Danish Superliga	13	1	1	0	—		—		14	1
Esbjerg fB	Total		38	8	4	3	—		—		42	11
Brøndby	2016–17	Danish Superliga	8	1	1	0	—		—		9	1
Brøndby	2017–18	Danish Superliga	15	2	1	0	3 (Note: Appearances in the UEFA Europa League)	0	—		19	2
Brøndby	2018–19	Danish Superliga	7	0	3	1	—		1 (Note: Appearance in Danish Superliga Europa League play-off)	0	11	1
Brøndby	2019–20	Danish Superliga	26	0	2	0	5	0	—		33	0
Brøndby	2020–21	Danish Superliga	23	1	0	0	—		—		23	1
Brøndby	2021–22	Danish Superliga	20	1	2	0	8 (Note: Two appearances in UEFA Champions League, six appearances in UEFA Europa League)	0	—		30	1
Brøndby	2022–23	Danish Superliga	9	0	0	0	0	0	—		9	0
Brøndby	2023–24	Danish Superliga	18	0	3	0	—		—		21	0
Brøndby	Total		126	5	12	1	17	0	1	0	156	6
Career total			274	33	21	5	17	0	1	0	313	38

== Honours ==
Viborg

- Danish 1st Division: 2012–13, 2014–15

Brøndby

- Danish Superliga: 2020–21
- Danish Cup: 2017–18; runner-up: 2018–19
