= Aleksandar Stankov (footballer) =

Macedonian footballer (born 1991)

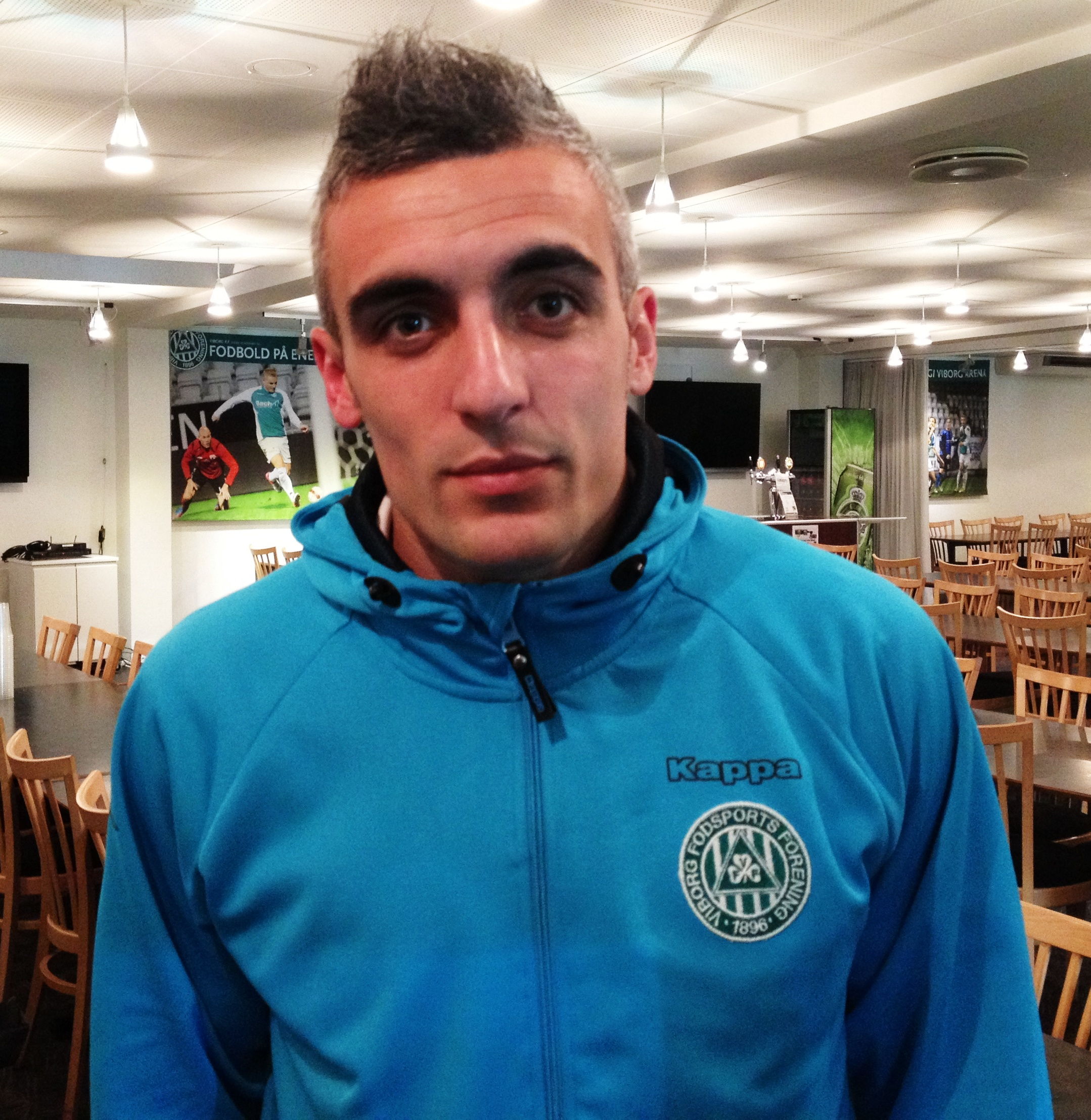
- Stankov in 2013

Personal information
- Date of birth: 19 February 1991 (age 35)
- Place of birth: Štip, SFR Yugoslavia
- Height: 1.82 m (6 ft 0 in)
- Position: Forward

Team information
- Current team: Esperanza Pelt

Youth career
- VV Swalmen
- SVC 2000
- Roda JC

Senior career*
Years	Team	Apps	(Gls)
2008–2012	Roda JC	2	(0)
2011–2012	→ FC Oss (loan)	14	(5)
2012–2013	Hobro	3	(2)
2013–2017	Viborg	81	(14)
2015	→ Horsens (loan)	10	(1)
2016	→ Horsens (loan)	9	(2)
2017	→ HB Tórshavn (loan)	10	(7)
2017–2018	HB Tórshavn	11	(3)
2019	SC Union Nettetal	10	(2)
2020–2021	Groene Ster		
2021–2022	KFC Diest		
2022–	Esperanza Pelt		

International career
2008–2010	Macedonia U19	6	(0)
2009–2012	Macedonia U21	12	(2)
- * Club domestic league appearances and goals as of 19 October 2017

Aleksandar Stankov (born 19 February 1991) is a Macedonian footballer who plays as a forward for Dutch Derde Divisie side RKSV Groene Ster.

== Club career ==
Stankov had a spell in Faroese football with HB Tórshavn. He then played or German Oberliga side Union Nettetal.

On 12 January 2020, RKSV Groene Ster confirmed, that the club had signed Stankov. In the summer 2021, he moved to Belgian club KFC Diest. A year later, he moved to Esperanza Pelt, also in Belgium.

== International career ==
Stankov was a member of the Macedonian U-21 national team.

== Personal life ==
Aleksandar Stankov's twin brother Antonio Stankov also plays professional football.

== Career statistics ==
=== Club ===
As of match played 23 June 2017

Appearances and goals by club, season and competition
Club	Season	League			National Cup		Other		Total	
Club	Season	Division	Apps	Goals	Apps	Goals	Apps	Goals	Apps	Goals
Roda	2008–09	Eredivisie	0	0	0	0	1 (Note: Appearance in the Eredivisie relegation play-offs)	0	1	0
Roda	2009–10	Eredivisie	1	0	0	0	0	0	1	0
Roda	2010–11	Eredivisie	1	0	0	0	0	0	1	0
Roda	Roda JC		2	0	0	0	1	0	3	0
FC Oss (loan)	2011–12	Eerste Divisie	14	5	0	0	0	0	14	5
Hobro	2012–13	Danish 1st Division	3	2	0	0	0	0	3	2
Viborg	2012–13	Danish 1st Division	12	2	0	0	0	0	12	2
Viborg	2013–14	Danish Superliga	30	5	0	0	0	0	30	5
Viborg	2014–15	Danish 1st Division	30	6	0	0	0	0	30	6
Viborg	2015–16	Danish Superliga	0	0	0	0	0	0	0	0
Viborg	2016–17	Danish Superliga	9	1	0	0	0	0	9	1
Viborg	2017–18	Danish 1st Division	0	0	0	0	0	0	0	0
Viborg	Viborg FF		81	14	0	0	0	0	81	14
Horsens (loan)	2015–16	Danish 1st Division	19	3	0	0	0	0	19	3
HB (loan)	2017	Meistaradeildin	10	7	2	0	0	0	12	7
Career total			129	31	2	0	1	0	132	31
