= 2014–15 FC Vestsjælland season =

FC Vestsjælland
- Full name: Football Club Vestsjælland
- Nickname: Vikingerne (The Vikings)
- Short name: FCV
- Founded: July 1, 2008; 18 years ago
- Ground: Harboe Arena Slagelse, Slagelse
- Capacity: 10,000
- Chairman: Kurt Andersen
- Manager: Michael Hansen
- League: Danish Superliga
- 2013-14: Danish Superliga, 9th
- Website: http://fcvvikings.com/
Home colours	Away colours

FC Vestsjælland, also known as FCV Vikings, is a professional Danish football club currently playing in the Danish Superliga. They play their home matches at Harboe Arena Slagelse in Slagelse, which has a capacity of 10,000 (3,300 seats). During the 2014/15 campaign they will be participating in the Danish Superliga.

== Competitions ==
=== Players in / out ===
==== In ====
No.	Pos.	Nat.	Name	Age	EU	Moving from	Type	Transfer window	Ends	Transfer fee	Source
12	RB	(Denmark)	Randrup	25	EU	AC Horsens (Denmark)	Transfer	Summer	2015	Free	
8	LM	(Denmark)	Due	32	EU	AaB (Denmark)	Transfer	Summer	2017	Free	
2	CB	(Norway)	Østli	30	EU	Lillestrøm SK (Sweden)	Transfer	Summer	2015	Free	
16	GK	(Denmark)	Villadsen	29	EU	FC Nordsjælland (Denmark)	Transfer	Summer	2015	Free	
18	CB	(Denmark)	Kure	29	EU	AGF (Denmark)	Transfer	Summer	2015	Free	
5	LB	(Germany)	Sowah	22	EU	Hamburger SV (Germany)	Transfer	Summer	2015	Free	
22	CM	(Ivory Coast)	Thome	18	EU	Kruoja (Lithuania)	Transfer	Summer	2016	Free	
25	GK	(Iceland)	Schram	19	EU	OB (Denmark)	Transfer	Summer	2015	Free	

==== Out ====
No.	Pos.	Nat.	Name	Age	EU	Moving to	Type	Transfer window	Transfer fee	Source
2	CB	(Denmark)	Nielsen	27	EU	OB	Contract ended	Summer	Free	
8	ST	(Nigeria)	Ofere	28	EU	Sogndal (Norway)	Contract ended	Summer	Free	
16	GK	(India)	Pal	27	EU	Mumbai (India)	Contract ended	Summer	Free	
12	ST	(Denmark)	Hansen	21	EU	HB Køge	Transfer	Summer	Free	
5	CM	(Denmark)	Bertolt	21	EU	Vendsyssel FF	Contract ended	Summer	Free	
18	ST	(Sweden)	Sandberg	22	EU	Örgryte IS (Sweden)	Contract ended	Summer	Free	
22	GK	(Denmark)	Petersen	22	EU	FC Roskilde	Contract ended	Summer	Free	
5	LW	(Denmark)	Berg	38	EU		End of career	Summer	n/a	

Last updated: 4 October

== Danish Superliga ==
18 July 2014 Match 1	FC Nordsjælland	3 - 2	FC Vestsjælland	Farum
18:30	Aabech 39'; Bech 77' 87'	Summary	Festersen 19'; Runje 29' (o.g.); Lund (yellow card) 46'	Stadium: Farum Park; Attendance: 3,349; Referee: (Denmark) Mads Kristoffersen

25 July 2014 Match 2	FC Vestsjælland	3 - 1	OB	Slagelse
18:30	Festersen 9'; Skúlason 23' (o.g.); Sørensen (yellow card) 40'; Sørensen 50'; Mikkelsen (yellow card) 85'	Summary	Larsen 64'	Stadium: Harboe Arena Slagelse; Attendance: 2,709; Referee: (Denmark) Peter Kjærsgaard-Andersen

2 August 2014 Match 3	FC Vestsjælland	2 - 2	Copenhagen	Slagelse
15:00	Sørensen 10'; Hende 21'; Bozga (yellow card) 36'; Lund (yellow card) 60'; Festersen (yellow card) 71'	Summary	Cornelius 56' 61' (pen.)	Stadium: Harboe Arena Slagelse; Attendance: 5,127; Referee: (Denmark) Jens Maae

8 August 2014 Match 4	Randers FC	1 - 0	FC Vestsjælland	Randers
18:30	Agesen (yellow card) 68'; Ishak 90'	Summary	Bozga (yellow card) 54'; Due (yellow card) 73'	Stadium: AutoC Park Randers; Attendance: 4,994; Referee: (Denmark) Jorgen Burchardt

17 August 2014 Match 5	FC Vestsjælland	2 - 0	Silkeborg IF	Slagelse
14:00	Lund 10'; Yobou Jean Noel Thome (yellow card) 61'; Due 63'	Summary	Agger (yellow card) 23'; Mikkelsen (yellow card) 47'; Beck Andersen (yellow card) 54'; Nicolaj Ritter (yellow card) 75'	Stadium: Harboe Arena Slagelse; Attendance: 1,997; Referee: (Denmark) Kenn Hansen

1 September 2014 Match 6	Hobro IK	3 - 1	FC Vestsjælland	Hobro
19:00	Antipas 28'; Hvilsom 43'; Thomsen 82'	Summary	Kristiansen (yellow card) 26'; Madsen (yellow card) 70'; Festersen 82'	Stadium: DS Arena; Attendance: 2,682; Referee: (Denmark) Peter Rasmussen

14 September 2014 Match 7	Esbjerg fB	3 - 0	FC Vestsjælland	Esbjerg
19:00	Söder 34' 45'; Pušić 52' (yellow card) 64'	Summary	Madsen (yellow card) 8'	Stadium: Blue Water Arena; Attendance: 5,209; Referee: (Denmark) Anders Poulsen

22 September 2014 Match 8	FC Vestsjælland	1 - 0	AaB	Slagelse
19:00	Jonas Thomsen (yellow card) 73'; Festersen 75'	Summary	Thelander (yellow card) 47'	Stadium: Harboe Arena Slagelse; Attendance: 2,703; Referee: (Denmark) Peter Rasmussen

28 September 2014 Match 9	FC Midtjylland	1 - 0	FC Vestsjælland	Herning
14:00	Sviatchenko (yellow card) 79'; Igboun 80'	Summary	Lund (yellow card) 53'; Hende (yellow card) 54'; Mikkelsen (yellow card) 65'	Stadium: MCH Arena; Attendance: 6,669; Referee: (Denmark) Kenn Hansen

5 October 2014 Match 10	FC Vestsjælland	1 - 1	SønderjyskE	Slagelse
13:00	Hende (yellow card) 12'; Kristiansen (yellow card) 27'; Due 56'	Summary	Bechmann 34'	Stadium: Harboe Arena Slagelse; Attendance: 2,667; Referee: (Denmark) Michael Tykgaard

19 October 2014 Match 11	Brøndby	5 - 0	FC Vestsjælland	Brøndbyvester
17:00	Kahlenberg 15'; Hjulsager 62'; Pukki 62'; Durmisi 81'; Rashani 88'	Summary	Jonas Thomsen (yellow card) 24'; Kure (yellow card) 79'	Stadium: Brøndby Stadium; Attendance: 12,190; Referee: (Denmark) Jakob Kehlet

24 October 2014 Match 12	Silkeborg IF	1 - 2	FC Vestsjælland	Silkeborg
18:30 CET	Agger 41'; Nicolaj Ritter (yellow card) 48'; Pedersen (yellow card) 55'	Summary	Kristiansen 8'; Festersen (yellow card) 36' (goal) 48' (pen.); Sørensen (yellow card) 90+3'	Stadium: Silkeborg Stadion; Attendance: 2,160; Referee: (Denmark) Michael Johansen

1 November 2014 Match 13	FC Vestsjælland	1 - 4	Esbjerg fB	Slagelse
17:00 CET	Lund (yellow card) 63'; Festersen 88'	Summary	Fellah 32'; Mikkelsen 34' (o.g.); Andreasen (yellow card) 46'; Gomes 54'; Vestergaard 81'	Stadium: Harboe Arena Slagelse; Attendance: 2,602; Referee: (Denmark) Anders Poulsen

9 November 2014 Match 14	AaB	2 - 0	FC Vestsjælland	Aalborg
15:00 CET	Risgård 36'; Wichmann 60'	Summary	Nymann (yellow card) 44'	Stadium: Nordjyske Arena; Attendance: 6,669; Referee: (Denmark) Michael Tkygaard

21 November 2014 Match 15	FC Vestsjælland	0 - 1	Randers FC	Slagelse
18:30 CET	Festersen (yellow card) 84'; Bozga (yellow card) 89'	Summary	Ishak 45'; Fisker (yellow card) 85'	Stadium: Harboe Arena Slagelse; Attendance: 1,849; Referee: (Denmark) Jørgen Daugbjerg Burchardt

1 December 2014 Match 16	FC Midtjylland	2 - 1	FC Vestsjælland	Herning
19:00 CET	Larsen 18'; Nielsen (yellow card) 32' (goal) 86'; Sisto (yellow card) 60'; Sparv (yellow card) 84'	Summary	Danni König 52'; Christensen (yellow card) 89'	Stadium: MCH Arena; Attendance: 6,778; Referee: (Denmark) Peter Rasmussen (referee)

7 December 2014 Match 17	FC Vestsjælland	1 - 1	Hobro IK	Slagelse
14:00 CET	Danni König (yellow card) 26'; Bozga (yellow card) 48'; Kure (yellow card) 59'; Festersen 80'		Berggreen 45'; Damborg (yellow card) 83'; Tjørnelund (yellow card) 83'	Stadium: Harboe Arena Slagelse; Attendance: 2,377; Referee: (Denmark) Dennis Mogensen

22 February 2015 Match 18	Copenhagen	2-0	FC Vestsjælland	Copenhagen
17:00 CET	Augustinsson (yellow card) 20' (goal) 54'; Høgli 45+1'	Summary	Østli (yellow card) 17'; Raitala (yellow card) 40'	Stadium: Telia Parken; Attendance: 12,631; Referee: (Denmark) Kenn Hansen

27 February 2015 Match 19	FC Vestsjælland	0-1	SønderjyskE	Slagelse
18:30	Kristiansen (yellow card) 43'; Jónsson (yellow card) 45'; Lund (yellow card) 47'; Raitala (yellow card) 66'; Madsen (yellow card) 69'	Summary	Paulsen 17'; Jónasson (yellow card) 73'	Stadium: Harboe Arena Slagelse; Attendance: 1,750; Referee: (Denmark) Lars Christoffersen

9 March 2015 Match 20	FC Vestsjælland	1-2	OB	Slagelse
19:00 CET	Festersen 10'; Vellios (yellow card) 38'; Jónsson (yellow card) 57'	Summary	Falk 20'; Spelmann (yellow card) 47'; Larsen (yellow card) 49'; Zohore 69'	Stadium: Harboe Arena Slagelse; Attendance: 2,138; Referee: (Denmark) Dennis Mogensen

15 March 2015 Match 21	FC Nordsjælland	2-0	FC Vestsjælland	Farum
14:00 CET	Baldvinsson 45'; Gregor (yellow card) 64'; Moberg Karlsson 68'	Summary		Stadium: Farum Park; Attendance: 3,243; Referee: (Denmark) Peter Kjærsgaard-Andersen

22 March 2015 Match 22	FC Vestsjælland	0-1	Brøndby	Slagelse
17:00 CET	Jónsson (yellow card) 18'; Madsen (yellow card) 77'; Akharraz (yellow card) 77'	Summary	Nørgaard 38'	Stadium: Harboe Arena Slagelse; Attendance: 4,242; Referee: (Denmark) Benjamin Svedborg

7 April 2015 Match 23	OB	1-2	FC Vestsjælland	Odense
19:00 CET	Dalgaard 4'	Summary	Festersen 51'; Vellios 59'	Stadium: TRE-FOR Park; Attendance: 4,331; Referee: (Denmark) Michael Dannemann Pleidrup Johansen

11 April 2015 Match 24	Randers FC	1-1	FC Vestsjælland	Randers
17:00 CET	Ishak 34'	Summary	Festersen 16'; Vellios (yellow card) 90'	Stadium: AutoC Park Randers; Attendance: 4,557; Referee: (Denmark) Michael Tykgaard

18 April 2015 Match 25	FC Vestsjælland	2-1	AaB	Slagelse
15:00 CET	Akharraz 47'; Jónsson (yellow card) 63'; Kure 75'; Lumb (yellow card) 88'	Summary	Helenius 18'; Kristensen (yellow card) 54'; Risgård (yellow card) 63'; Børsting (yellow card) 67'; Petersen (yellow card) 87'	Stadium: Harboe Arena Slagelse; Attendance: 1,854; Referee: (Denmark) Peter Kjærsgaard-Andersen

26 April 2015 Match 26	Brøndby	4-0	FC Vestsjælland	Brøndbyvester
17:00 CET	Larsson (yellow card) 36' (goal) 78'; Nørgaard 48' 51'; Ørnskov (yellow card) 64'; Nikolai Laursen 89'	Summary	Jónsson (yellow card) 80'; Sørensen (yellow card) 82'	Stadium: Brøndby Stadium; Attendance: 12,014; Referee: (Denmark) Jakob Kehlet

3 May 2015 Match 27	FC Vestsjælland	2-1	FC Nordsjælland	Slagelse
14:00 CET	Kure 25'; Akharraz 90'; Jónsson (yellow card) 90'	Summary	Bech 13' (pen.); Gregor (yellow card) 27'; Maxsø (yellow card) 90'	Stadium: Harboe Arena Slagelse; Attendance: 1,688; Referee: (Denmark) Jens Maae

11 May 2015 Match 28	FC Vestsjælland	0-1	Copenhagen	Slagelse
19:00 CET	Østli (yellow card) 36'; Festersen (yellow card) 44'	Summary	Augustinsson (yellow card) 12'; Gíslason (yellow card) 35'; Delaney 58' (yellow card) 67'; Felfel (yellow card) 90'	Stadium: Harboe Arena Slagelse; Attendance: 3,544; Referee: (Denmark) Dennis Mogensen

17 May 2015 Match 29	Hobro IK	0-1	FC Vestsjælland	Hobro
14:00 CET		Summary	Bozga 89' (yellow card) 90'	Stadium: DS Arena; Attendance: 2,082; Referee: (Denmark) Lars Christoffersen

21 May 2015 Match 30	FC Vestsjælland	0-0	FC Midtjylland	Slagelse
18:00 CET	Hende (yellow card) 40'	Summary	Sviatchenko (yellow card) 54'	Stadium: Harboe Arena Slagelse; Attendance: 2,432; Referee: (Denmark) Benjamin Svendborg

24 May 2015 Match 31	SønderjyskE	1-1	FC Vestsjælland	Haderslev
17:00 CET	Marxen (yellow card) 57'; Bozga 77' (o.g.)	Summary	Jónsson (yellow card) 27'; Sørensen 42'	Stadium: Haderslev Fodboldstadion; Attendance: 5,075; Referee: (Denmark) Kenn Hansen

31 May 2015 Match 32	Esbjerg fB	2-1	FC Vestsjælland	Esbjerg
16:00 CET	van Buren 47' 90'; Friberg (yellow card) 88'	Summary	Vellios 15'; Hende (yellow card) 51'; Kure (yellow card) 69'; Festersen (yellow card) 79'; Bozga (yellow card) 82'; Raitala (yellow card) 90'	Stadium: Blue Water Arena; Attendance: 10,702; Referee: (Denmark) Mads-Kristoffer Kristoffersen

7 June 2015 Match 33	FC Vestsjælland	3-1	Silkeborg IF	Slagelse
16:00 CET	Vellios 34' (pen.); Sørensen 48'; Jónsson (yellow card) 76'; Nymann 86'	Summary	Thomas Nørgaard (yellow card) 34'; Hansen (yellow card) 38'; Jens Martin Gammelby (yellow card) 41'; Agger 87'	Stadium: Harboe Arena Slagelse; Attendance: 1,201; Referee: (Denmark) Michael Dannemann Pleidrup Johansen

== League table ==
Pos	Team	Pld	W	D	L	GF	GA	GD	Pts	Qualification or relegation
8	Esbjerg	33	10	10	13	47	45	+2	40	
9	OB	33	11	7	15	35	43	−8	40	
10	SønderjyskE	33	7	16	10	35	44	−9	37	
11	Vestsjælland (R)	33	9	6	18	31	52	−21	33	Relegation to Danish 1st Division
12	Silkeborg (R)	33	2	8	23	26	59	−33	14	Relegation to Danish 1st Division

Source: Danish Superliga
Rules for classification: 1) points; 2) goal difference; 3) number of goals scored
(R) Relegated
