= 2015–16 Odense Boldklub season =

Odense Boldklub
2015–16 season
- Chairman: Niels Thorborg
- Manager: Kent Nielsen
- Ground: TRE-FOR Park
- Danish Superliga: 7th
- Danish Cup: Third round
- Top goalscorer: League: Rasmus Festersen (12); All: Rasmus Festersen (14)
Home colours	Away colours

The 2015–16 Odense Boldklub season was the teams' 127th football season since formation. They ended 7th in the Danish Superliga and were knocked out in the third round of DBU Pokalen.

== Pre-season and friendlies ==
OB did precede their 2015–16 campaign with a local tour of 2 exhibition matches on Funen, including a training camp in Sweden, with friendlies against Nottingham Forest and Ängelholm.

26 June 2015	Marstal	0–2	Odense	Marstal
17:45 CEST		Report		Stadium: Marstal Stadion Stadion

28 June 2015	Krarup/Espe	1–11	Odense	Espe
14:00 CEST		Report		Stadium: Espe Stadion

8 July 2015	Nottingham Forest	2–4	Odense	Trelleborg
19:00 CEST		Report		Stadium: Vångavallen

12 July 2015	Ängelholm	0–3	Odense	Ängelholm
14:00 CEST		Report		Stadium: Ängelholms IP

== First team ==
Last updated on 17 February 2016

Squad no.	Name	Nationality	Position	Date of birth (age)
Goalkeepers
1	Michael Tørnes	(Denmark)	GK	8 January 1986 (aged 30)
13	Sten Grytebust	(Norway)	GK	25 October 1989 (aged 26)
16	Michael Falkesgaard	(Denmark)	GK	9 April 1991 (aged 25)
25	Maksym Koval	(Ukraine)	GK	9 December 1992 (aged 23)
Defenders
3	Frederik Tingager	(Denmark)	CB	22 February 1993 (aged 23)
4	Hallgrímur Jónasson (captain)	(Iceland)	CB	4 May 1986 (aged 30)
5	Lasse Nielsen	(Denmark)	CB	3 March 1987 (aged 29)
6	Mohammed Diarra	(Guinea)	LB	20 June 1992 (aged 23)
20	Jacob Barrett Laursen	(Denmark)	LB	17 November 1994 (aged 21)
22	Ari Skúlason	(Iceland)	LB	14 May 1987 (aged 29)
24	Oliver Lund	(Denmark)	RB	21 August 1990 (aged 25)
30	Magnus Pedersen	(Denmark)	CB	23 November 1996 (aged 19)
Midfielders
7	Jóan Símun Edmundsson	(Faroe Islands)	LM	26 July 1991 (aged 24)
8	Mohamed El Makrini	(Netherlands)	CM	6 July 1987 (aged 28)
11	Lucas Jensen	(Denmark)	RM	8 October 1994 (aged 21)
14	Jens Jakob Thomasen	(Denmark)	CM	25 May 1996 (aged 20)
15	Izunna Uzochukwu	(Nigeria)	CM	11 April 1990 (aged 26)
18	Azer Bušuladžić	(Bosnia and Herzegovina)	CM	12 November 1991 (aged 24)
19	Mikkel Desler	(Denmark)	CM	19 February 1995 (aged 21)
21	Mathias Greve	(Denmark)	CM	11 February 1995 (aged 21)
29	Anders Thomsen	(Denmark)	CM	29 July 1995 (aged 20)
Forwards
9	Rasmus Falk	(Denmark)	FW	15 January 1992 (aged 24)
10	Rasmus Festersen	(Denmark)	FW	26 August 1986 (aged 29)
28	Anders K. Jacobsen	(Denmark)	FW	27 October 1989 (aged 26)

== Transfers and loans ==
=== Transfers in ===
Entry date	Position	No.	Player	From club	Fee	Ref.
1 July 2015	CM	14	(Denmark) Jens Jakob Thomasen	Youth academy		
1 July 2015	CB	30	(Denmark) Magnus Pedersen	Youth academy		
1 July 2015	CB	3	(Denmark) Kasper Larsen	(Kazakhstan) FC Astana	Back from loan	
1 July 2015	FW	23	(Denmark) Thomas Mikkelsen	(Sweden) IFK Göteborg	Back from loan	
1 July 2015	GK	16	(Denmark) Michael Falkesgaard	(Denmark) Brøndby IF	Free transfer	
1 July 2015	DF	24	(Denmark) Oliver Lund	(Denmark) FC Vestsjælland	?	
1 July 2015	CM	8	(Netherlands) Mohamed El Makrini	(Netherlands) SC Cambuur	Free transfer	
3 July 2015	FW	10	(Denmark) Rasmus Festersen	(Denmark) FC Vestsjælland	3,000,000 DKK	
13 August 2015	GK	1	(Denmark) Michael Tørnes	(Norway) Sandefjord Fotball	Free transfer	
31 August 2015	GK	25	(Ukraine) Maksym Koval	(Ukraine) FC Dynamo Kyiv	Loan	
19 September 2015	CM	26	(Denmark) Matti Lund Nielsen	(Italy) Delfino Pescara 1936	Free transfer	
1 January 2016	CB	3	(Denmark) Frederik Tingager	(Denmark) Holbæk B&I	?	
26 January 2016	CM	15	(Nigeria) Izunna Uzochukwu	(Russia) FC Amkar Perm	5,250,000 DKK	
17 February 2016	GK	13	(Norway) Sten Grytebust	(Norway) Aalesunds FK	Free transfer	
Total					8,250,000 DKK	

^{a} = Market value

=== Transfers out ===
Departure date	Position	No.	Player	To club	Fee	Ref.
1 July 2015	LB	–	(Denmark) Emil Peter Jørgensen	(Denmark) FC Fredericia	Free transfer	
1 July 2015	CM	8	(Denmark) Martin Spelmann	(Turkey) Gençlerbirliği S.K.	3,000,000 DKK	
1 July 2015	CB	26	(Denmark) Daniel Høegh	(Switzerland) FC Basel	6,000,000 DKK	
1 July 2015	RB	28	(Norway) Håkon Skogseid	(Norway) Lillestrøm SK	End of contract	
1 July 2015	GK	17	(Denmark) Mads Toppel	(Denmark) Næsby BK	Free transfer	
14 August 2015	CB	3	(Denmark) Kasper Larsen	(Netherlands) FC Groningen	3,400,000 DKK	
27 August 2015	FW	13	(Georgia (country)) Vladimir Dvalishvili		Released	
31 December 2015	MF	26	(Denmark) Matti Lund Nielsen		End of contract	
8 January 2016	DF	2	(Denmark) Mikkel Kirkeskov	(Norway) Aalesunds FK	?	
13 January 2016	MF	15	(Denmark) Lasse Kryger	(Denmark) AC Horsens	?	
22 January 2016	MF	7	(Denmark) Emil Larsen	(United States) Columbus Crew SC	3,000,000 DKK	
28 January 2016	GK	27	(Denmark) Casper Radza	(Denmark) Næsby BK	Released	
31 January 2016	FW	17	(Denmark) Kenneth Zohore	(Netherlands) K.V. Kortrijk	10,000,000 DKK	
Total					25,400,000 DKK	

== Competitions ==
=== Danish Superliga ===
==== League table ====
Pos	Team	Pld	W	D	L	GF	GA	GD	Pts
5	AaB	33	15	5	13	56	44	+12	50
6	Randers	33	13	8	12	45	43	+2	47
7	Odense	33	14	4	15	50	52	−2	46
8	Viborg	33	11	7	15	34	42	−8	40
9	Nordsjælland	33	11	5	17	35	51	−16	38

Source: DBU, Soccerway
Rules for classification: 1) Points; 2) Goal difference; 3) Goals scored; 4) Head-to-head points; 5) Head-to-head goal difference; 6) Head-to-head goals scored; 7) Head-to-head away goals scored; 8) Play-off on neutral ground (only if rankings are important for medals, teams for relegation or teams for UEFA competitions); 9) Draw.

==== Matches ====
19 July 2015 1	Odense	3–0	Hobro	Odense
13:30 CEST	Festersen 23'; Skúlason (yellow card) 42'; Greve 66'; Falk 83'	Report	Jessen (yellow card) 37'; Mikkelsen (yellow card) 90'	Stadium: TRE-FOR Park; Attendance: 7,797; Referee: Michael Svendsen

26 July 2015 2	Brøndby	1–2	Odense	Copenhagen
16:00 CEST	Pukki 11'	Report	Festersen 30', 66'; Kirkeskov (yellow card) 63'; Falk (yellow card) 79'	Stadium: Brøndby Stadion; Attendance: 11,494; Referee: Kenn Hansen

31 July 2015 3	Midtjylland	1–0	Odense	Herning
20:30 CEST	Sviatchenko (yellow card) 72'; Sparv (yellow card) 78'; Duncan 90+3'	Report	Jónasson (yellow card) 25'; Lund (yellow card) 46'; Festersen (yellow card) 54'; El Makrini (yellow card) 65'; Kirkeskov (yellow card) 90+2'	Stadium: MCH Arena; Attendance: 6,477; Referee: Mads Kristoffer Kristoffersen

7 August 2015 4	Odense	2–2	Aarhus	Odense
18:00 CEST	Festersen 2'; Greve (yellow card) 35'; Skúlason 45'; Lund (yellow card) 65'	Report	Aabech 30'; Vadsadze 62', (yellow card) 67'; Elez (yellow card) 90+5'	Stadium: TRE-FOR Park; Attendance: 9,932; Referee: Lars Christoffersen

16 August 2015 5	Odense	2–3	Randers	Odense
18:00 CEST	Skúlason 16'; Larsen (yellow card) 35'; Diarra (yellow card) 45+1'; Zohore 46'	Report	Tverskov 4'; Fenger (yellow card) 14'; Brock-Madsen 51' (pen.); Lundberg 80'	Stadium: TRE-FOR Park; Attendance: 7,692; Referee: Peter Kjærsgaard

24 August 2015 6	Aalborg	5–1	Odense	Herning
19:00 CEST	Enevoldsen 9'; Risgård 16', 88'; Spalvis 58'; Børsting 89'	Report	Larsen 62'; Kirkeskov (yellow card) 80'	Stadium: MCH Arena; Attendance: 8,014; Referee: Jacob Kehlet

30 August 2015 7	Odense	1–0	Copenhagen	Odense
18:00 CEST	Lund (yellow card) 11'; Jacobsen 62'; Bušuladžić (yellow card) 81'	Report		Stadium: TRE-FOR Park; Attendance: 10,039; Referee: Anders Poulsen

14 September 2015 8	Esbjerg	4–2	Odense	Esbjerg
19:00 CEST	Söder 1'; Lekven (yellow card) 12'; Bille 17', (yellow card) 90+1'; Pálsson 30', (yellow card) 57'; Mensah 62'	Report	Zohore 43'; El Makrini 54'	Stadium: Blue Water Arena; Attendance: 5,329

19 September 2015 9	Odense	2–0	Viborg	Odense
16:00 CEST	Bušuladžić (yellow card) 32'; Zohore 44'; Falk (yellow card) 75'; Kryger 83'	Report	Pallesen (yellow card) 33'; Déblé (red card) 84'	Stadium: TRE-FOR Park; Attendance: 5,807; Referee: Mads-Kristoffer Kristoffersen

25 September 2015 10	SønderjyskE	4–0	Odense	Haderslev
18:00 CEST	Madsen 19'; Absalonsen 24'; Drachmann (yellow card) 34'; Pedersen 40'; Dalgaard 86'	Report	Falk (yellow card) 30'	Stadium: Haderslev Fodboldstadion; Referee: Jørgen Daugbjerg Burchardt

2 October 2015 11	Nordsjælland	1–5	Odense	Farum
18:00 CEST	Vingaard 17'; Petry (yellow card) 40'; Gregor (yellow card) 81'	Report	Festersen 22' (pen.), 29', 72'; El Makrini (yellow card) 35'; Zohore 78'; Greve 90+2'	Stadium: Farum Park; Attendance: 4,811; Referee: Jens Maae

17 October 2015 12	Odense	1–2	SønderjyskE	Odense
18:00 CEST	Zohore 28'; Bušuladžić (yellow card) 81'; Koval (yellow card) 88'	Report	Dalgaard 58'; Absalonsen 68'	Stadium: TRE-FOR Park; Attendance: 5,617; Referee: Anders Poulsen

26 October 2015 13	Randers	1–1	Odense	Farum
19:00 CEST	Borring 31'	Report	Zohore 11'; El Makrini (yellow card) 67'	Stadium: Farum Park; Attendance: 4,209; Referee: Jakob Kehlet

1 November 2015 14	Odense	2–5	Brøndby	Odense
18:00 CEST	Zohore 6'; Jacobsen 90+1'	Report	Austin 8'; Pukki 12'; Kahlenberg 30', (yellow card) 44'; Elmander 85', 90+2'	Stadium: TRE-FOR Park; Attendance: 10,272; Referee: Kenn Hansen

8 November 2015 15	Viborg	0–1	Odense	Viborg
13:30 CEST		Report	Skúlason (yellow card) 68'; Festersen 71'; Greve (yellow card) 75'	Stadium: Energi Viborg Arena; Attendance: 3,803; Referee: Peter Kjærsgaard-Andersen

20 November 2015 16	Odense	1–1	Midtjylland	Odense
18:00 CEST	Festersen 80'; Bušuladžić (yellow card) 84'	Report	Rømer (yellow card) 81', (goal) 88'	Stadium: TRE-FOR Park; Attendance: 4,501; Referee: Jakob Kehlet

30 November 2015 17	Odense	2–1	Esbjerg	Odense
18:00 CEST	Koval (yellow card) 27'; Desler (yellow card) 31'; Festersen 48'; El Makrini (yellow card) 56'; Lund (yellow card) 73'; Falk 90+3'	Report	Bille 20'; Jessen (yellow card) 78'; Almebäck (yellow card) 86'	Stadium: TRE-FOR Park; Attendance: 4,310; Referee: Benjamin Svedborg

6 December 2015 18	Copenhagen	4–1	Odense	Copenhagen
18:00 CEST	M. Jørgensen 17', 27'; N. Jørgensen 69'; Nielsen 75' (o.g.)	Report	Jacobsen 88'	Stadium: Telia Parken; Attendance: 14,636; Referee: Kenn Hansen

26 February 2016 19	Odense	2–2	Aarhus	Odense
18:00 CEST	Jacobsen 53'; Skúlason (yellow card) 80'; Greve 65', (yellow card) 88'	Report	Bjarnason 12', (yellow card) 85'; Backman 16'; Elez (yellow card) 32'; Pedersen (yellow card) 71'; Jønsson (yellow card) 84'; Aabech (yellow card) 88'	Stadium: TRE-FOR Park; Attendance: 7,459; Referee: Jens Maae

4 March 2016 20	Aalborg	0–1	Odense	Aalborg
18:00 CEST	Kakeeto (yellow card) 31'	Report	El Makrini (yellow card) 32'; Festersen 56'	Stadium: Nordjyske Arena; Attendance: 5,620; Referee: Peter Kjærsgaard-Andersen

13 March 2016 21	Odense	3–1	Nordsjælland	Odense
13:00 CEST	Jacobsen 18'; Festersen 77'; Falk 89'	Report	Mikkelsen 44'	Stadium: TRE-FOR Park; Attendance: 5,044; Referee: Anders Poulsen

19 March 2016 22	Hobro	0–2	Odense	Hobro
16:00 CEST	Kirkevold (yellow card) 33'; Ogunbiyi (yellow card) 37'; Park (yellow card) 75'	Report	Jacobsen 49'; Falk 72'	Stadium: DS Arena; Attendance: 1,504; Referee: Michael Tykgaard

3 April 2016 23	Odense	0–1	Randers	Odense
13:00 CEST		Report	Ishak 45'; Marxen (yellow card) 90+2'	Stadium: TRE-FOR Park; Attendance: 6,611; Referee: Jørgen Daugbjerg Burchardt

10 April 2016 24	Brøndby	1–0	Odense	Copenhagen
18:00 CEST	Jakobsen (yellow card) 37'; Phiri 38'; Boysen (yellow card) 72'	Report	Nielsen (yellow card) 74'	Stadium: Brøndby Stadion; Attendance: 11,263; Referee: Jens Maae

17 April 2016 25	Odense	5–1	Viborg	Odense
13:00 CEST	Festersen 35' (pen.); Falk 40'; Uzochukwu (yellow card) 43'; Jacobsen 47', 67', 77'; El Makrini (yellow card) 56'; Bušuladžić (yellow card) 59'	Report	Akharraz (yellow card) 10'; Reese (yellow card) 34'; Curth 57'; Lerager (yellow card) 61'	Stadium: TRE-FOR Park; Attendance: 4,722; Referee: Lars Christoffersen

22 April 2016 26	Midtjylland	2–0	Odense	Herning
18:00 CEST	Pušić 4', 51'; Rømer (yellow card) 42'; Sparv (yellow card) 57'; Sisto (yellow card) 68'	Report	Uzochukwu (yellow card) 39'	Stadium: MCH Arena; Attendance: 7,011; Referee: Michael Tykgaard

2 May 2016 27	Esbjerg	0–2	Odense	Esbjerg
19:00 CEST	Stenderup (yellow card) 39'; Paulsen (yellow card) 51'	Report	Jacobsen 19'; Lund (yellow card) 71'; Falk (yellow card) 79'; Skúlason 90+3'	Stadium: Blue Water Arena; Attendance: 5,675; Referee: Peter Kjærsgaard-Andersen

8 May 2016 28	Odense	0–1	Copenhagen	Odense
16:00 CEST	Laursen (yellow card) 26'	Report	Verbič (yellow card) 13'; Santander 40'	Stadium: TRE-FOR Park; Attendance: 9,911; Referee: Jakob Kehlet

12 May 2016 29	Nordsjælland	0–1	Odense	Farum
18:00 CEST	Gregor (yellow card) 24' (yellow-red card) 56'; Vingaard (yellow card) 53'	Report	Festersen 42'; El Makrini (yellow card) 64'	Stadium: Right to Dream Park; Attendance: 2,615; Referee: Jens Maae

15 May 2016 30	Odense	0–1	Hobro	Odense
14:00 CEST		Report	Domoraud 42'; Park (yellow card) 66'; Justesen (yellow card) 73'; Hastrup (yellow card) 89'	Stadium: TRE-FOR Park; Attendance: 5,776; Referee: Benjamin Svedborg

20 May 2016 31	SønderjyskE	2–1	Odense	Haderslev
18:00 CEST	Kroon 7'; Bechmann 32'	Report	Jacobsen 16'; El Makrini (yellow card) 44'	Stadium: Haderslev Fodboldstadion; Referee: Peter Kjærsgaard-Andersen

==== Results summary ====
Overall								Home						Away					
Pld	W	D	L	GF	GA	GD	Pts	W	D	L	GF	GA	GD	W	D	L	GF	GA	GD
33	14	4	15	50	52	−2	46	7	3	6	29	23	+6	7	1	9	21	29	−8

Last updated: 29 May 2016.
Source: Statto.com

==== Result by round ====
Matchday	1	2	3	4	5	6	7	8	9	10	11	12	13	14	15	16	17	18	19	20	21	22	23	24	25	26	27	28	29	30	31	32	33
Ground	H	A	A	H	H	A	H	A	H	A	A	H	A	H	A	H	H	A	H	A	H	A	H	A	H	A	A	H	A	H	A	A	H
Result	W	W	L	D	L	L	W	L	W	L	W	L	D	L	W	D	W	L	D	W	W	W	L	L	W	L	W	L	W	L	L	L	W
Position	1	1	4	4	5	9	8	8	7	9	6	8	8	9	8	8	7	7	7	7	6	6	6	6	6	6	6	7	6	7	7	7	7

Updated to match(es) played on 29 May 2016. Source: Statto.com
A = Away; H = Home; W = Win; D = Draw; L = Loss

=== DBU Pokalen ===
9 September 2015 Second round	Tarup/Paarup	0–2	Odense	Odense
17:45 CEST	Festersen 70', 81'	Report	Fønss (yellow card) 44'	Stadium: TRE-FOR Park; Attendance: 3,015; Referee: Mads Kristoffer Kristoffersen

26 July 2015 Third round	Fredericia	2–1	Odense	Fredericia
16:00 CEST	Podstavek (yellow card) 23'; Ćatović 37'; Baldvinsson (yellow card) 69'; Feldballe 81'	Report	Zohore 38'	Stadium: Monjasa Park; Attendance: 1,680; Referee: Michael Tykgaard

== Squad statistics ==
=== Goalscorers ===
Includes all competitive matches. The list is sorted by shirt number when total goals are equal.

Last updated on 8 May 2016

Rank	Pos.	No.	Player	Superliga	DBU Pokalen	Total
1	FW	10	Rasmus Festersen	14	2	16
2	FW	28	Anders K. Jacobsen	10	0	10
3	FW	–	Kenneth Zohore	7	1	8
4	MF	9	Rasmus Falk	5	0	5
5	MF	21	Mathias Greve	3	0	3
5	DF	22	Ari Skúlason	3	0	3
7	MF	8	Mohamed El Makrini	1	0	1
7	MF	–	Lasse Kryger	1	0	1
7	MF	–	Emil Larsen	1	0	1
TOTALS				44	3	47

=== Disciplinary record ===
As of match played 8 May 2016

No.	Pos.	Name	Superliga		DBU Pokalen		Total	
No.	Pos.	Name	Booked	Sent off (straight red)	Booked	Sent off (straight red)	Booked	Sent off (straight red)
8	MF	(Netherlands) Mohamed El Makrini	7	0	0	0	7	0
18	MF	(Bosnia and Herzegovina) Azer Bušuladžić	5	0	0	0	5	0
24	DF	(Denmark) Oliver Lund	5	0	0	0	5	0
9	FW	(Denmark) Rasmus Falk	4	0	0	0	4	0
–	DF	(Denmark) Mikkel Kirkeskov	3	0	1	0	4	0
21	MF	(Denmark) Mathias Greve	3	0	0	0	3	0
22	DF	(Iceland) Ari Skúlason	3	0	0	0	3	0
15	MF	(Nigeria) Izunna Uzochukwu	2	0	0	0	2	0
25	GK	(Ukraine) Maksym Koval	2	0	0	0	2	0
4	DF	(Iceland) Hallgrímur Jónasson	1	0	0	0	1	0
5	DF	(Denmark) Lasse Nielsen	1	0	0	0	1	0
6	DF	(Guinea) Mohammed Diarra	1	0	0	0	1	0
10	FW	(Denmark) Rasmus Festersen	1	0	0	0	1	0
19	MF	(Denmark) Mikkel Desler	1	0	0	0	1	0
–	MF	(Denmark) Emil Larsen	1	0	0	0	1	0
Total			40	0	1	0	41	0
