= 2011 Division 1 (Swedish football) =

Division 1
- Season: 2011
- Champions: Umeå FC (north); Varbergs BoIS (south)
- Promoted: Umeå FC; Varbergs BoIS
- Relegated: Valsta Syrianska IK; Bodens BK; Hammarby Talang FF; FC Rosengård; Husqvarna FF; Motala AIF
- Top goalscorer: Allan Borgvardt (19)

The 2011 Division 1 was contested by 28 teams divided into two groups geographically. Umeå FC and Varbergs BoIS won their respective groups, and were thereby qualified for play in the 2012 Superettan.

== League tables ==
=== North ===
Location of the 2011 Division 1 Norra teams

Pos	Team	Pld	W	D	L	GF	GA	GD	Pts	Promotion or relegation
1	Umeå FC (C, P)	26	15	6	5	43	27	+16	51	Promotion to Superettan
2	FC Väsby United	26	15	5	6	51	26	+25	50	Qualification to Promotion playoffs
3	IK Sirius	26	14	8	4	44	20	+24	50	
4	Dalkurd FF	26	14	7	5	51	35	+16	49	
5	BK Forward	26	9	11	6	45	37	+8	38	
6	Vasalunds IF	26	9	10	7	44	36	+8	37	
7	Karlstad BK	26	9	6	11	36	39	−3	33	
8	IK Frej	26	8	8	10	36	29	+7	32	
9	Syrianska IF Kerburan	26	9	5	12	35	51	−16	32	
10	IFK Luleå	26	7	9	10	26	38	−12	30	
11	Akropolis IF	26	7	8	11	32	36	−4	29	
12	Valsta Syrianska IK (R)	26	8	4	14	37	47	−10	28	Relegation to Division 2
13	Boden (R)	26	4	8	14	29	54	−25	20	Relegation to Division 2
14	Hammarby Talang (R)	26	5	3	18	27	61	−34	18	Relegation to Division 2

Source: svenskfotboll.se (in Swedish)
Rules for classification: 1) points; 2) goal difference; 3) number of goals scored.
(C) Champions; (P) Promoted; (R) Relegated

=== South ===
Pos	Team	Pld	W	D	L	GF	GA	GD	Pts	Promotion or relegation
1	Varbergs BoIS (C, P)	26	16	6	4	56	27	+29	54	Promotion to Superettan
2	IF Sylvia	26	16	1	9	54	33	+21	49	Qualification to Promotion playoffs
3	Örgryte IS	26	14	5	7	49	32	+17	47	
4	IK Oddevold	26	12	5	9	40	39	+1	41	
5	Lunds BK	26	11	6	9	35	26	+9	39	
6	Kristianstads FF	26	9	10	7	46	38	+8	37	
7	IK Sleipner	26	11	4	11	36	50	−14	37	
8	Norrby IF	26	11	2	13	39	38	+1	35	
9	FC Trollhättan	26	10	4	12	45	45	0	34	
10	IF Limhamn Bunkeflo	26	9	7	10	38	41	−3	34	
11	Skövde AIK	26	9	6	11	31	42	−11	33	
12	FC Rosengård (R)	26	7	7	12	34	40	−6	28	Relegation to Division 2
13	Husqvarna FF (R)	26	7	3	16	23	48	−25	24	Relegation to Division 2
14	Motala AIF (R)	26	5	4	17	31	58	−27	19	Relegation to Division 2

Source: svenskfotboll.se (in Swedish)
Rules for classification: 1) points; 2) goal difference; 3) number of goals scored.
(C) Champions; (P) Promoted; (R) Relegated

== Season statistics ==
=== Scoring ===
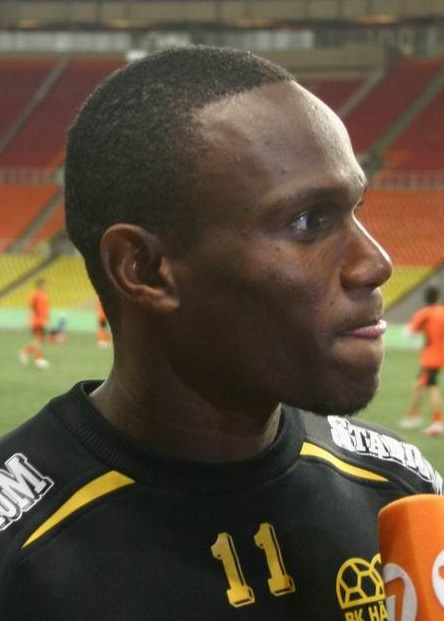
Robert Mambo Mumba has over 50 caps for the Kenya national football team.

North
Rank	Player	Club	Goals
1	(Kenya) Robert Mambo Mumba	Dalkurd FF	16
2	(Sweden) Ante Björkebaum	IK Sirius	14
3	(Sweden) Osman Sow	Väsby United	12
4	(Sweden) Joakim Blomkvist	IK Frej	11
4	(Sweden) Viktor Olsson	Karlstad BK	11
4	(Sweden) Aldin Dibranin	Valsta Syrianska IK	11
4	(Sweden) Erik Lundström	Umeå FC	11
4	(Sweden) Bryan Massa	Väsby United	11
4	(Sweden) Matias Bulun	Syrianska IF Kerburan	11
10	(Sweden) Simon Mårtensson	Umeå FC	10
10	(The Gambia) Alagie Sosseh	IK Sirius	10

South
Rank	Player	Club	Goals
1	(Denmark) Allan Borgvardt	IF Sylvia	19
2	(Sweden) Patrik Larsson	Varbergs BoIS	14
3	(Sweden) Henrik Svedberg	Norrby IF	13
4	(Sweden) Josef Daoud	FC Trollhättan	12
4	(Sweden) Jakob Olsson	Örgryte IS	12
4	(Kenya) Sunday Eyenga	IK Sleipner	12
7	(Sweden) Nicolas Sandberg	Örgryte IS	10
7	(Nigeria) Nsima Peter	Kristianstads FF	10
9	(Sweden) Hans-Erik Månsson	Varbergs BoIS	9
9	(Sweden) Emil Karlsson	Skövde AIK	9
9	(Sweden) Henrik Fribrock	Kristianstads FF	9

== Stars of Tomorrow all-star game ==
At the end of each Division 1 season, the best young players from each group compete in an all-star game called "Morgondagens Stjärnor" (English: "Stars of Tomorrow").

Team North
Position	Player	Club
GK	(Sweden) Kevin Angleborn	Hammarby TFF
GK	(Sweden) Jacob Rinne	BK Forward
DF	(Sweden) Serop Budur	Syrianska IF Kerburan
DF	(Sweden) Dillan Ismail	IK Sirius
DF	(Sweden) Fredrik Lundgren	Bodens BK
DF	(Sweden) Robin Schäufélé	Bodens BK
DF	(Sweden) Robin Tranberg	Hammarby TFF
DF	(Sweden) Sebastian Hansen	Valsta Syrianska IK
MF / FW	(Sweden) Ferid Ali	Vasalunds IF
MF / FW	(Palestine) Ahmed Awad	Dalkurd FF
MF / FW	(Sweden) Eduardo Ringman	Vasalunds IF
MF / FW	(Sweden) Emil Johansson	Vasalunds IF
MF / FW	(Nigeria) John Junior	Syrianska IF Kerburan
MF / FW	(Sierra Leone) Alhassan Kamara	Bodens BK
MF / FW	(Sweden) Martin Falkeborn	Akropolis IF
MF / FW	(Sweden) Mikei Söderström	IK Frej
Coach	(Sweden) Axel Kjäll	BK Forward
Coach	(Sweden) Thomas Lagerlöf	Väsby United

Team South
Position	Player	Club
GK	(Sweden) Mergim Krasniq	Norrby IF
DF	(Sweden) Enis Ahmetovic	IF Sylvia
DF	(Sweden) Sebastian Andersson	Husqvarna FF
DF	(Sweden) Mehmed Dresevic	Norrby IF
DF	(Sweden) Pontus Otterstedt	Örgryte IS
DF	(Sweden) Andreas Uusitalo	Skövde AIK
DF	(Sweden) Anton Vilstrup	Skövde AIK
MF / FW	(Sweden) Arif Azemi	Varbergs BoIS
MF / FW	(Sweden) Agon Beqir	Västra Frölunda IF
MF / FW	(Sweden) Irfan Delimedjac	Norrby IF
MF / FW	(Sweden) Saman Ghoddos	IF Limhamn Bunkeflo
MF / FW	(Sweden) Jakob Lindström	Örgryte IS
MF / FW	(Sweden) Dardan Mustafa	Lunds BK
MF / FW	(Sweden) Sebastian Ohlsson	Skövde AIK
MF / FW	(Sweden) Emil Vidovic	FC Rosengård
MF / FW	(Sweden) Simon Adjei Karlsson	Husqvarna FF
Coach	(North Macedonia) Erol Bekir	IF Limhamn Bunkeflo
Coach	(Sweden) Jesper Ljung	FC Trollhättan
