= Anders Kure =

Danish footballer (born 1985)

Personal information
- Full name: Anders Kure Vidkjær
- Date of birth: 12 September 1985 (age 41)
- Place of birth: Aarhus, Denmark
- Height: 1.87 m (6 ft 2 in)
- Position: Centre-back

Youth career
- 1994–2003: AGF

Senior career*
Years	Team	Apps	(Gls)
2003–2014	AGF	222	(6)
2014–2016	Vestsjælland	36	(2)
2016	Vejle	9	(0)
Total		267	(8)

International career
2000–2001	Denmark U16	5	(0)
2001–2002	Denmark U17	16	(1)
2002	Denmark U18	3	(0)
2003–2004	Denmark U19	10	(0)
2004–2005	Denmark U20	5	(0)
- * Club domestic league appearances and goals

Anders Kure Vidkjær (Danish: [ˈɑnɐs ˈkʰuɐ]; born 12 September 1985) is a Danish former professional footballer who played as a centre-back. He played most of his career for hometown club AGF together with his brother, Kasper Kure.

== Early life ==
Anders Kure Vidkjær was born on 12 September 1985 in Aarhus, Denmark, and grew up in the southern suburb of Højbjerg, the son of Bente and Peter. Both parents worked to support the family, his mother as a municipal worker for Aarhus Municipality, and his father as a logistics worker in shipping. Kure attended Rosenvangsskolen in nearby Viby J, and was a fan of local club AGF as a child. He started playing badminton as a schoolboy for Aarhus Badmintonklub, but soon switched to football where he began playing for AGF alongside his older brother Kasper Kure as a nine-year-old.

== Club career ==
=== AGF ===
==== Youth squads ====
Already from an early age, Kure was a standout player in defense for AGF, and the youth teams he played for were among the best in the country. As a 13-year-old, he was included in the regional team for his age group, and was later chosen for a team consisting of the best youth players from Jutland, where he impressed.

He signed his first youth contract with AGF at age 16, despite interest from English club Middlesbrough.

==== First team ====
Kure made his professional debut for AGF on 16 August 2003 in the Danish Superliga, coming on as a substitute for Alex Nørlund with 18 minutes to play, after fellow centre-back Morten Petersen had been sent off. His brother, Kasper, scored in the game which ended in a 5–3 victory against Midtjylland.

On 1 August 2004, Kure signed his first professional contract. He had made his breakthrough for the first team as a left-back the previous season, and competed with regular starter Shane Cansdell-Sherriff.

He scored his first goal on 7 May 2006 in a 3–1 away win over Esbjerg fB at Blue Water Arena; the first match under new head coach Ove Pedersen. The club would be relegated to the second tier in the 2005–06 season, after more than 30 seasons in the top tier.

During his time with AGF, Kure grew into a fan favourite and was named vice-captain behind Steffen Rasmussen. He became renowned being a hard-tackling defender with an extremely high work rate. He left the club as his contract expired in June 2014 after more than 20 years at the club. He made 222 appearances for the club, in which he scored nine goals.

=== Vestsjælland ===
On 4 September 2014, Kure signed a three-year contract with Superliga club FC Vestsjælland. He made his debut on 22 September as he started in a 1–0 home win against AaB on Slagelse Stadium. On 18 April 2015, he scored his first goal for the club, heading in a cross from Henrik Madsen to secure in 2–1 victory against AaB. His second goal came two games later, heading in a free kick by Rasmus Festersen to help Vestsjælland to another 2–1 home win, this time against Nordsjælland. In his first season at the club, in which they suffered relegation, he made 22 appearances, scoring twice.

Kure left Vestsjælland as a free agent after the club filed for bankruptcy in December 2015.

=== Vejle ===
Kure joined Vejle Boldklub on 11 January 2016, signing a six-month contract. He made his debut on 20 March, starting in a 4–3 win in the local rivalry match against AC Horsens.

He left the club as his contract expired in June 2016. After having considered his future during the summer, Kure decided to retire in September 2016 to focus on a career outside football.

== International career ==
Kure was capped at youth level for Denmark, making appearances between under-15 to under-20 level. During his years for the national youth teams, he faced other players born in 1985, such as Cristiano Ronaldo, Wayne Rooney, Roberto Soldado and Mario Gomez.

== Personal life ==
Kure was married to Vicki in December 2013. He studied economy at Aarhus University.

After his football career, Kure first moved to Hamburg, Germany, where he worked as change manager for DSV. He since moved to Copenhagen where he began working for the Ministry of Finance specialising in digitalisation, including NemID.

== Honours ==
AGF

- Danish 1st Division: 2010–11
