= FC Gladsaxe =

Association football club in Denmark

- Full name: F.C. Gladsaxe
- Founded: 15 October 1968; 57 years ago
- Ground: Skovbrynet Skole, Bagsværd
- League: Zealand Series (VI)
Home colours	Away colours

FC Gladsaxe, previously VB 1968 is a football club based in Værebroparken, Bagsværd, Denmark. Founded in 1968, the club describes itself as multicultural and working towards integration through football.

== History ==
=== Foundation ===
VB 1968 was established on 15 October 1968, around the same time as the public housing project Værebroparken in the Copenhagen-suburb Bagsværd, was completed. Since Tom Fogelberg's arrival in Værebroparken, he had been contemplating the idea of founding Værebro Boldklub due to his keen interest in football. However, the inception of Værebro Boldklub originated from a community meeting discussing available land for development. During this meeting, some young individuals suggested the formation of a football club. Tom recognised that even though Akademisk Boldklub (AB) was situated on the other side of Motorring 4, the prominent club had challenges ensuring all its members had opportunities to participate in competitive matches. Additionally, there was a strong sense of local identity in having Værebroparken host its own football club, one that could represent the community in matches against other clubs. Notably, other individuals, including Torkild Svendsen and Kjeld Elgård Pedersen, also lent their support to this idea.

Upon foundation, Tom Fogelberg assumed the role of chairman and Torkild Svendsen as treasurer.

=== From Series 6 to Denmark Series (2003–24) ===
The team, consisting of a diverse group of nationalities, started steadily ascending through the football hierarchy of DBU Zealand, the local governing body for association football on Zealand, Denmark through the 2000s and 2010s. Their journey began in 2003, competing in the lowest division, known as Serie 6, and culminated in their promotion to the fifth-tier Zealand Series (Sjællandsserien) in 2010. However, celebrations were cut short after four seasons in the Zealand Series, with their best finish being fourth place. In the autumn season of 2014, they were relegated back to Serie 1.

Their stay in Serie 1 was brief, as they swiftly returned to the Zealand Series in the autumn of 2015. However, their second stint in the Zealand Series was marred by a 17-point deduction due to the use of an ineligible player. Finally, in the autumn of 2020, after several near misses, they made a return to the Zealand Series. Two seasons later, they made history by securing promotion to the Denmark Series for the first time in club history in 2022, but finished bottom of their Denmark Series group in 2023–24 and were relegated back to the Zealand Series.

VB 1968 have been able to sign several high-profile players in the 2020s, including former professional players Nicki Bille Nielsen, André Riel, Martin Albrechtsen, Stephan Andersen, Quincy Antipas, Adnan Mohammad, Kim Aabech, Christian Offenberg, Ricki Olsen, and Osama Akharraz.

=== FC Gladsaxe (2024–present) ===
On 9 January 2024, it was announced that the club would change its name to FC Gladsaxe. They finished bottom of their Denmark Series group in 2023–24 and were relegated back to the Zealand Series.
