= Adnan Mohammed =

Adnan Mohammed or Adnan Mohammad may refer to:

- Adnan Muhammed Ali Al Saigh, Saudi detainee at Guantanamo Bay
- Adnan Mohammad (born 1996), Danish footballer
