= Hans Aabech =

Danish footballer (1948–2018)

Personal information
- Full name: Hans Vilhelm Aabech
- Date of birth: 1 November 1948
- Place of birth: Copenhagen, Denmark
- Date of death: 8 January 2018 (aged 69)
- Place of death: Copenhagen, Denmark
- Position: Forward

Senior career*
Years	Team	Apps	(Gls)
1968–1972	Skovshoved	16	(5)
1973–1974	Hvidovre	22	(28)
1974–1975	Club Brugge	16	(5)
1975–1976	Twente	17	(1)
1976–1977	De Graafschap	19	(1)
1977–1979	Oostende	37	(24)
1979	Hvidovre	11	(0)
1980–1982	KB	59	(30)
1983	Lyngby	9	(1)
1983–1984	HIK		

International career
1973–1974	Denmark	3	(0)
- * Club domestic league appearances and goals

Hans Vilhelm Aabech (1 November 1948 – 8 January 2018) was a Danish football player. He played for a number of clubs, including Hvidovre IF, Kjøbenhavns Boldklub and Lyngby Boldklub in Denmark, Club Brugge and K.V. Oostende in Belgium, and Dutch clubs Twente Enschede and De Graafschap.

He was twice top scorer in the Danish 1. Division, in 1973 and 1980.

== International career ==
Aabech made his debut for Denmark in an October 1973 friendly match against Hungary and earned a total of 3 caps (no goals). His final international was in June 1974 against Sweden.

== Personal life ==
He was the father of footballer Kim Aabech.
