= Kasper Kure =

Danish footballer (born 1982)

Personal information
- Full name: Kasper Kure Vidkjær
- Date of birth: 20 July 1982 (age 44)
- Place of birth: Aarhus, Denmark
- Height: 1.85 m (6 ft 1 in)
- Position: Centre-back

Youth career
- 1989–2000: AGF

Senior career*
Years	Team	Apps	(Gls)
2000–2006	AGF	42	(2)
2006–2011	Brabrand		

International career
1997–1998	Denmark U16	4	(0)
1998–1999	Denmark U17	7	(0)
- * Club domestic league appearances and goals

Kasper Kure Vidkjær (born 20 July 1982) is a Danish former professional footballer who played as a centre-back. He was a product of the AGF academy and has also played for their senior team alongside his brother Anders. He also played for Brabrand and has represented Denmark at youth level.

== Early life ==
Kasper Kure Vidkjær was born on 20 July 1982 in Aarhus, Denmark, and grew up in the southern suburb of Højbjerg, the son of Bente and Peter. Both parents worked to support the family, his mother as a municipal worker for Aarhus Municipality, and his father as a logistics worker in shipping. Kure attended Rosenvangsskolen in nearby Viby J, and was a fan of local club AGF as a child. He started playing football for the club as a seven-year-old, and was later joined by his younger brother Anders.

== Club career ==
=== AGF ===
After having progressed through the AGF youth academy, Kure made his professional debut on 15 October 2000, coming on as a substitute in the 72nd minute for Jesper Andersen in a 4–0 league loss to Copenhagen in Parken Stadium. This remained his only appearance in the 2000–01 season.

He scored his first goal on 16 August 2003, which was also his brother Anders' professional debut, in a 5–3 league victory against Midtjylland. On 18 June 2004, he extended his contract with AGF by two years, keeping him at the club until 2006.

=== Brabrand ===
Kure joined Danish 1st Division club Brabrand IF after his contract expired in June 2006, signing a one-year deal. He made his debut for the club on 16 July 2006 in a match against Fremad Amager. Brabrand were relegated to the third tier at the end of the season, after AGF lost to HIK on the final matchday.

He retired from football in 2011 after five years with Brabrand to focus on a career as a graphic designer.
