= Jukka Raitala =

Finnish footballer (born 1988)

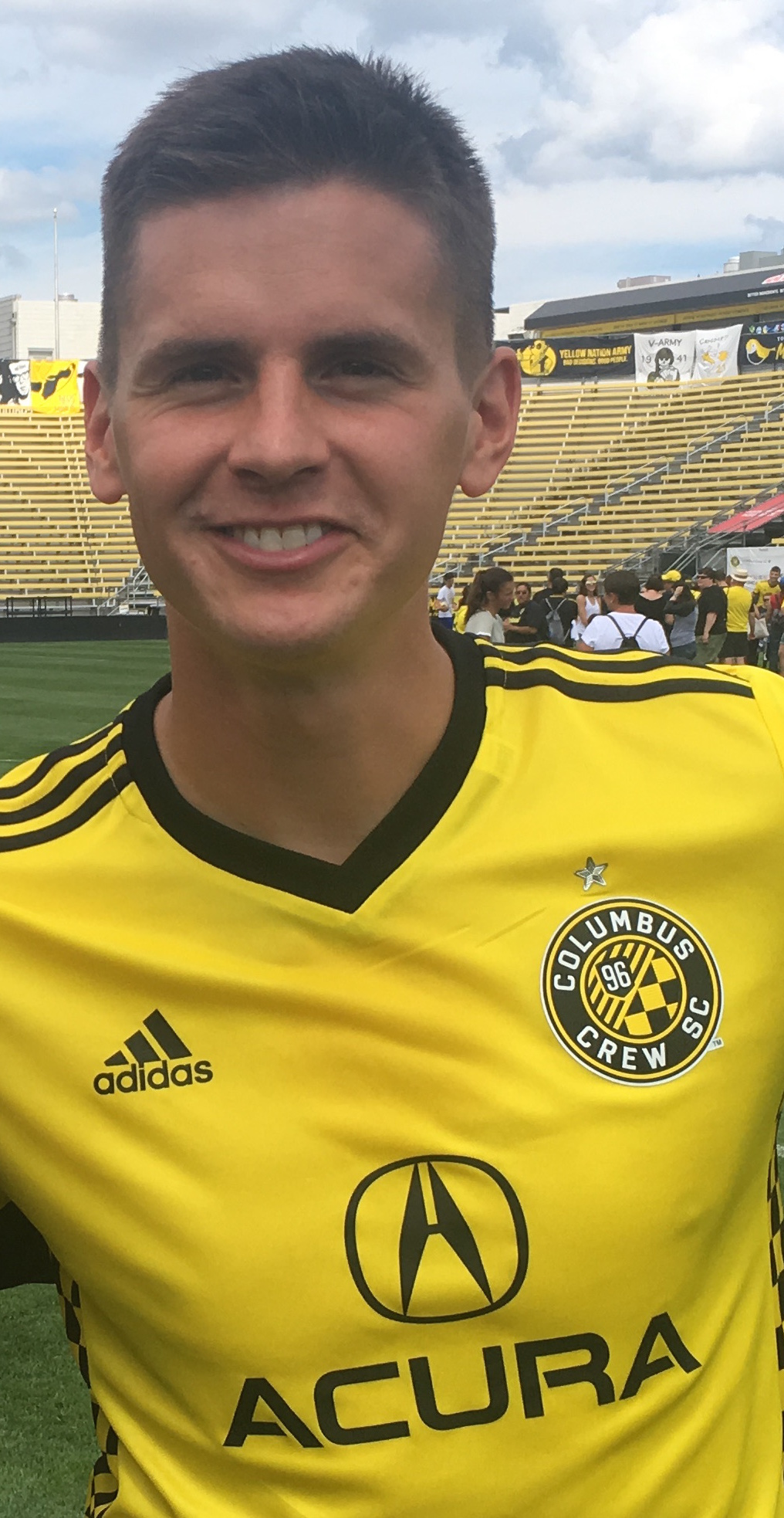
- Raitala with the Columbus Crew in 2017

Personal information
- Full name: Jukka Matias Raitala
- Date of birth: 15 September 1988 (age 38)
- Place of birth: Kerava, Finland
- Height: 5 ft 11 in (1.80 m)
- Position: Defender

Team information
- Current team: Gnistan
- Number: 22

Youth career
- 1995–2005: Keravan Pallo-75
- 2005–2006: HJK

Senior career*
| Years | Team | Apps | (Gls) |
| 2006 | Klubi 04 | 22 | (0) |
| 2007–2009 | HJK | 66 | (0) |
| 2009–2010 | → TSG 1899 Hoffenheim (loan) | 2 | (0) |
| 2010 | TSG 1899 Hoffenheim II | 2 | (0) |
| 2010–2012 | TSG 1899 Hoffenheim | 0 | (0) |
| 2010–2011 | → SC Paderborn 07 (loan) | 29 | (0) |
| 2011–2012 | → Osasuna (loan) | 17 | (0) |
| 2012–2015 | Heerenveen | 26 | (1) |
| 2015 | Vestsjælland | 15 | (0) |
| 2015–2016 | Aalborg BK | 5 | (0) |
| 2016 | Sogndal | 28 | (1) |
| 2017 | Columbus Crew | 28 | (0) |
| 2018–2020 | Montreal Impact | 69 | (1) |
| 2021 | Minnesota United | 9 | (0) |
| 2022–2023 | HJK | 43 | (0) |
| 2024– | Gnistan | 49 | (0) |

International career^{‡}
| | Finland U17 | 2 | (0) |
| 2005–2006 | Finland U19 | 3 | (0) |
| 2007–2010 | Finland U21 | 19 | (0) |
| 2009–2022 | Finland | 64 | (0) |
Medal record
Finland national football team
| Runner-up | Baltic Cup | 2012 |
| Third place | Baltic Cup | 2014 |
HJK Helsinki
| Winner | Finnish Cup | 2008 |
| Runner-up | Finnish League Cup | 2009 |
| Winner | Veikkausliiga | 2009 |
- * Club domestic league appearances and goals as of 19 November 2025 ‡ National team caps and goals as of 09:24, 22 June 2021 (UTC)

Jukka Matias Raitala (born 15 September 1988) is a Finnish professional footballer who plays for Veikkausliiga club IF Gnistan. He usually plays as a left back in both his club side and the Finland football team but can also operate as a right back or a central defender. Raitala was born in Kerava, Finland, where he played for the local youth team before moving to HJK's youth organization.

== Club career ==
=== Early career ===
Raitala joined the Keravan Pallo-75 junior team at the age of seven. He played there for ten years before he moved to HJK in 2005. After just one year in the youth team he was promoted to HJK's reserve team, Klubi-04. In his lone season with Klubi-04, Raitala made 22 appearances.

=== HJK ===
In 2007, he made his first appearance for the senior side at the age of eighteen and was since then a regular in the starting eleven. His success with the Finland national under-21 football team and HJK has made him a transfer target in Finland. For a long time Raitala refused to sign a new contract with HJK, but when the club left him out of the playing squad he chose to sign a new deal that kept him in Helsinki until the end of the 2011 season.

In 2008, SpVgg Greuther Fürth scouted him in Helsinki. In October 2008, Finnish sports magazine IS Veikkaaja reported that AEK Athens, Ajax and 1899 Hoffenheim are also scouting him. In Greek Day News, Raitala stated that he is interested in a move to AEK and that he is friends with AEK's Perparim Hetemaj. In November, West Bromwich Albion invited him for a test period after preparative negotiations with HJK. Raitala never did the trip and stated he does not want to risk playing time by moving. He wants a guarantee for his place in the 2009 Under-21 Euros team.

In January 2009, Newcastle United invited him for a week-long trial with their first team. It was also reported in Finnish IS Veikkaaja that Udinese Calcio and Middlesbrough F.C. are watching his progress. In April 2009, Express.de wrote that Raitala is 1. FC Köln's top candidate to replace Pierre Womé as their left-back. On 23 April, Express.de said that Raitala is going to meet Köln and he has an exit clause in his new contract with HJK. This was later denied by the Finnish club. On 21 April 2009, Raitala signed a new three-year deal with HJK. In May 2009, Ajax Amsterdam, PSV Eindhoven, Bayer Leverkusen, AZ Alkmaar and Bordeaux joined the race to sign Raitala.

=== 1899 Hoffenheim ===
On 31 August, HJK announced that Raitala had joined Hoffenheim on a season-long loan deal for a €150,000 loan fee, with an option to buy him after the loan. On 15 March 2010, Raitala made his Bundesliga debut for Hoffenheim playing as a right defender against Werder Bremen. On 1 April 2010, TSG 1899 Hoffenheim signed him for four years for an additional transfer fee of €250,000.

On 31 August 2010, he was loaned to 2. Bundesliga side SC Paderborn 07 for one season, where he made 29 league appearances in total.

=== Osasuna ===
On 28 July 2011, he was loaned again, this time to Osasuna in Spanish La Liga, with the Spaniards having an option to buy him for €1.25 million at the end of the season. On 28 August 2011, Raitala made his La Liga debut for Osasuna playing as a left defender against Atletico Madrid. Although being a starter during the first five league matches, he has since battled for the first-choice status with local prospect Eneko Satrústegui.

=== SC Heerenveen ===
On 6 June 2012, Raitala signed a four-year contract with a Dutch Eredivisie club SC Heerenveen for a transfer fee of €800,000. His contract was dissolved on 2 February 2015, after he had lost prospect of play time.

=== FC Vestsjælland & AaB ===
In 2015, Raitala played in Denmark. He signed a half-year contract with FC Vestsjælland on a free transfer. The club ended below the relegation zone, but the Danish media wrote that Raitala had been one of the best players in the club's weakly half year.

In the Summer of 2015, Raitala signed for one more half year with AaB. Raitala began very well, and played the first three matches and created one assist. But later was it clear that the competition on the left back-position was too strong. On 30 November 2015, announced the sports director Allan Gaarde, that Raitala had to find a new club.

On 3 December 2015 it was announced, that Raitala would leave the club at the end of the season with his contract expiring.

=== Sogndal ===
Raitala signed with Norwegian Tippeligaen club Sogndal for the 2016 season in February 2016.

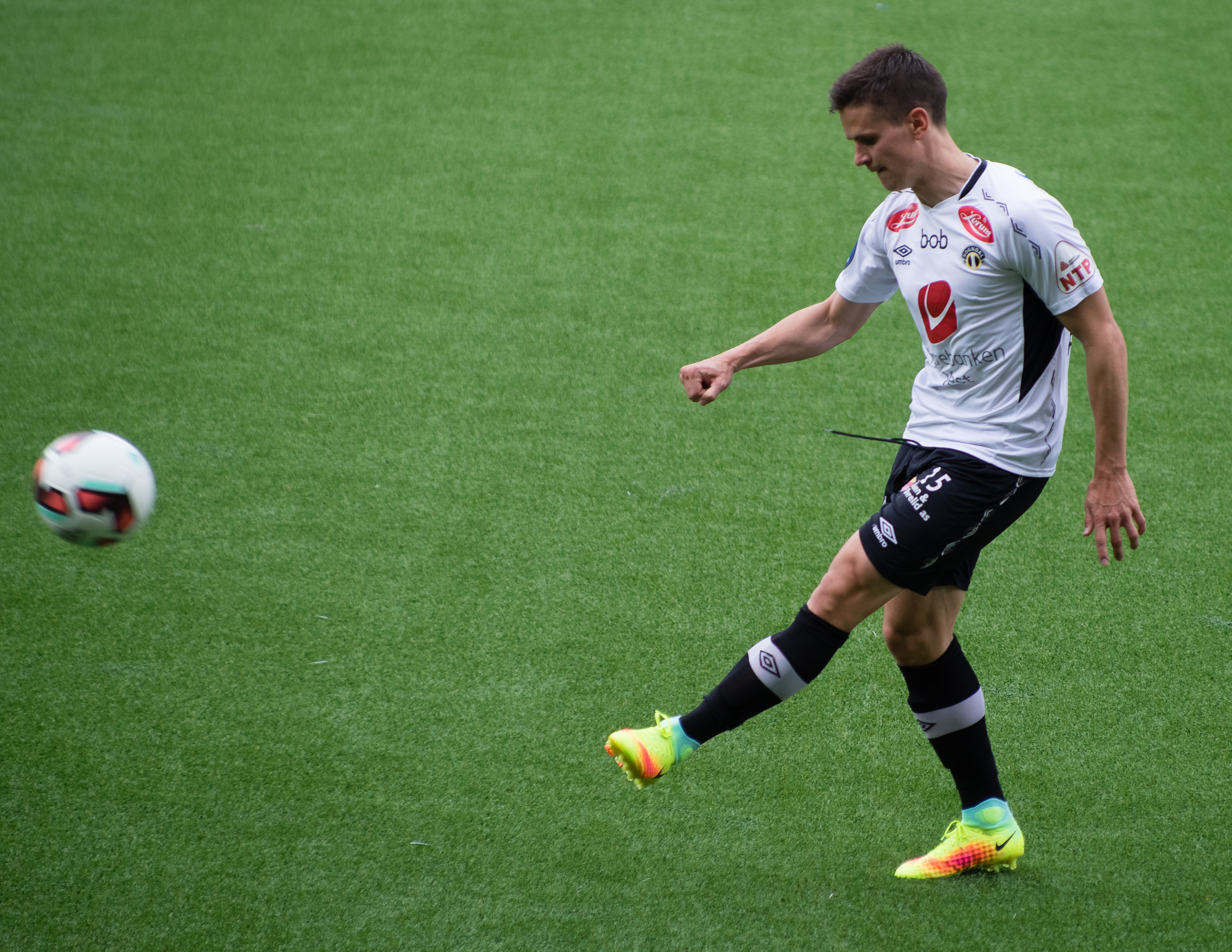
Raitala with Sogndal in 2016

=== MLS career ===
On 23 December 2016, Raitala started his journey in Major League Soccer after Columbus Crew SC acquired him through a Discovery Signing for the 2017 season.

After one season with Columbus, on 12 December 2017, Raitala was selected by Los Angeles FC in the 2017 MLS Expansion Draft. He was then immediately traded with fellow expansion draftee Raheem Edwards to Montreal Impact in exchange for defender Laurent Ciman. Raitala's contract with Montreal expired at the conclusion of the 2020 season.

On 28 January 2021, Raitala's MLS rights were traded to Minnesota United and the club subsequently signed Raitala to a new contract.

=== Return to HJK ===
On 21 December 2021, it was announced that Raitala had returned to his first professional club HJK. Raitala was named the player of the year after the 2022 season, by the Finnish FA Southern district, and by the coaches of his team.

On 8 December 2023, it was announced that Raitala will leave HJK after the season, since the club's CEO Aki Riihilahti and a new sporting director Vesa Mäki announced that they saw no future for him in the club. Raitala, the club legend, won three Finnish Championship titles with HJK (2009, 2022, 2023).

=== IF Gnistan ===
On 11 December 2023, a newly promoted Veikkausliiga side Gnistan from Northern Helsinki announced the signing of Raitala.

== International career ==
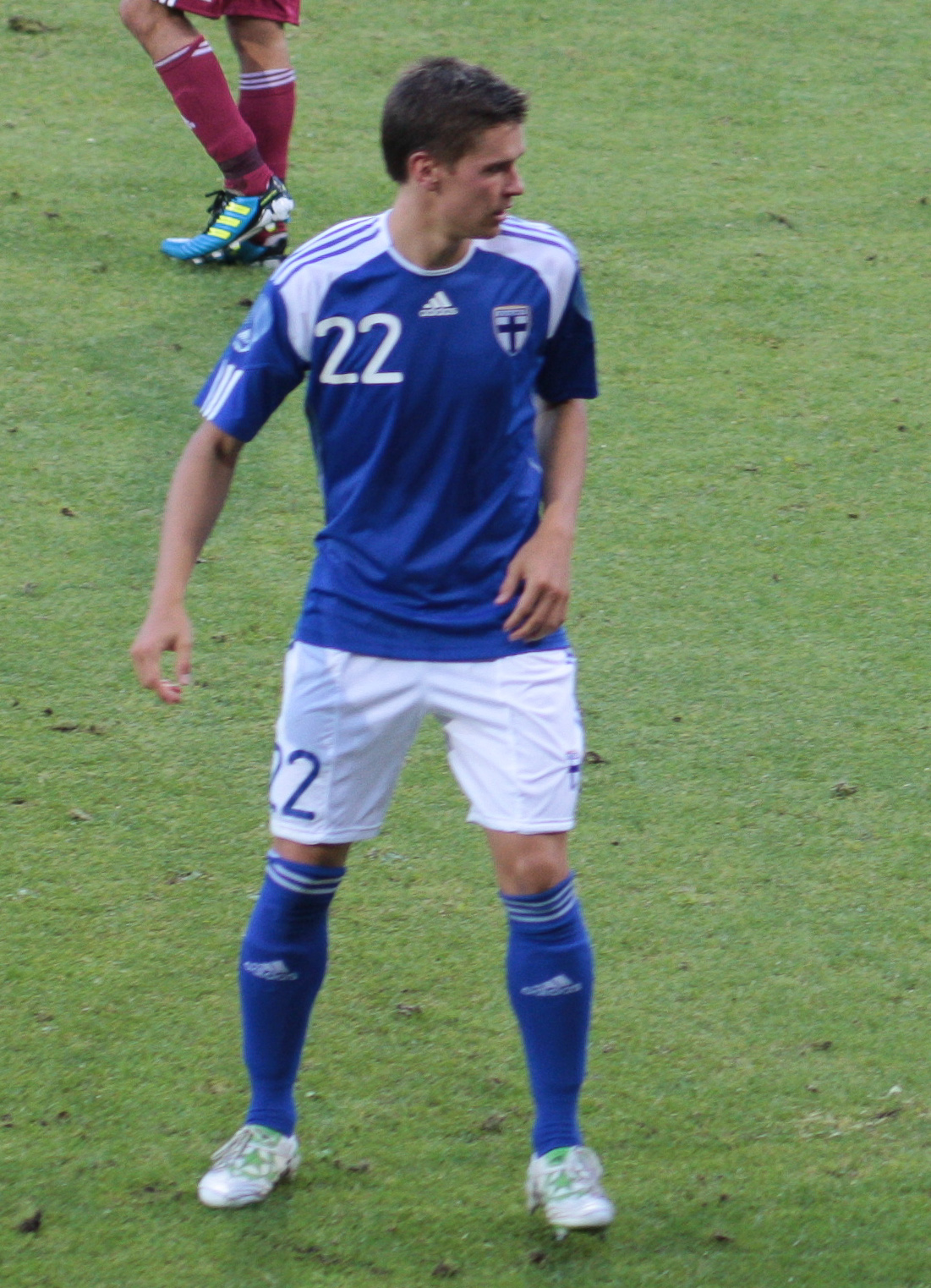
Raitala with the national team in 2011

When Raitala was 20 years old he made his Finland national team debut on 4 February 2009, in Tokyo in a friendly match against Japan when Stuart Baxter used him as a substitute. He played his first UEFA European Championship qualification game on 3 June 2011 when Mixu Paatelainen chose him to the starting line up against San Marino in Serravalle. During summer 2011 he established himself as a regular in the Finland national team.

He was also a regular in the Finnish under-21 team that qualified for the UEFA European Under-21 Football Championship final tournament in 2009.

He was subsequently a member of the twenty-six players selected by Markku Kanerva to compete in UEFA Euro 2020, the first official international competition for the Finns. On 12 June 2021, he was a starter for Finland's first UEFA Euro 2020 match against Denmark. This encounter resulted in a 1–0 victory for Finland, but is unfortunately famous for seeing Denmark midfielder Christian Eriksen's cardiac arrest. Raitala competed in Finland's all three tournament matches, against Denmark, Russia and Belgium, but eventually they were eliminated from the competition in the group stage with two losses and one win.

Raitala retired from the international football in November 2021, at the end of the 2022 FIFA World Cup qualification campaign, after making 63 international appearances for Finland.

== Career statistics ==
=== Club ===
As of 11 March 2025

| Club | Season | League | | | Cup (Note: Includes the Copa del Rey, KNVB Cup, Danish Cup, and Canadian Championship) | | Continental (Note: All appearances in the UEFA Europa League) | | Other | | Total | |
| Club | Season | Division | Apps | Goals | Apps | Goals | Apps | Goals | Apps | Goals | Apps | Goals |
|---|---|---|---|---|---|---|---|---|---|---|---|---|
| Klubi 04 | 2006 | Ykkönen | 22 | 0 | – | | – | | – | | 22 | 0 |
| HJK | 2007 | Veikkausliiga | 23 | 0 | 0 | 0 | 4 | 0 | – | | 27 | 0 |
| HJK | 2008 | Veikkausliiga | 23 | 0 | 0 | 0 | – | | – | | 23 | 0 |
| HJK | 2009 | Veikkausliiga | 20 | 0 | 0 | 0 | 2 | 0 | – | | 22 | 0 |
| HJK | Total | | 66 | 0 | 0 | 0 | 6 | 0 | 0 | 0 | 72 | 0 |
| TSG Hoffenheim (loan) | 2009–10 | Bundesliga | 2 | 0 | 0 | 0 | – | | – | | 2 | 0 |
| TSG Hoffenheim | 2010–11 | Bundesliga | 0 | 0 | 0 | 0 | – | | – | | 0 | 0 |
| TSG Hoffenheim | 2011–12 | Bundesliga | 0 | 0 | 0 | 0 | – | | – | | 0 | 0 |
| TSG Hoffenheim | Total | | 2 | 0 | 0 | 0 | 0 | 0 | 0 | 0 | 2 | 0 |
| TSG Hoffenheim II | 2010–11 | Regionalliga Süd | 2 | 0 | – | | – | | – | | 2 | 0 |
| SC Paderborn (loan) | 2010–11 | 2. Bundesliga | 29 | 0 | 0 | 0 | – | | – | | 29 | 0 |
| Osasuna (loan) | 2011–12 | La Liga | 17 | 0 | 2 | 0 | – | | – | | 19 | 0 |
| Heerenveen | 2012–13 | Eredivisie | 18 | 0 | 2 | 0 | 3 | 0 | 2 (Note: Appearances in the European competition play-offs) | 0 | 25 | 0 |
| Heerenveen | 2013–14 | Eredivisie | 2 | 0 | 0 | 0 | – | | – | | 2 | 0 |
| Heerenveen | 2014–15 | Eredivisie | 6 | 1 | 1 | 0 | – | | – | | 7 | 1 |
| Heerenveen | Total | | 26 | 1 | 3 | 0 | 3 | 0 | 2 | 0 | 34 | 1 |
| Vestsjælland | 2014–15 | Danish Superliga | 15 | 0 | 4 | 0 | – | | – | | 19 | 0 |
| AaB | 2015–16 | Danish Superliga | 5 | 0 | 1 | 0 | – | | – | | 6 | 0 |
| Sogndal | 2016 | Tippeligaen | 28 | 1 | 0 | 0 | – | | – | | 28 | 1 |
| Columbus Crew | 2017 | MLS | 28 | 0 | 0 | 0 | 2 (Note: Appearances in the MLS Cup Playoffs) | 0 | – | | 30 | 0 |
| Montreal Impact | 2018 | MLS | 28 | 1 | 2 | 0 | – | | – | | 30 | 1 |
| Montreal Impact | 2019 | MLS | 26 | 0 | 5 | 0 | 2 (Note: Includes CONCACAF Champions League) | 0 | – | | 33 | 0 |
| Montreal Impact | 2020 | MLS | 13 | 0 | 0 | 0 | – | | 3 (Note: Includes MLS is Back) | 0 | 16 | 0 |
| Montreal Impact | Total | | 67 | 1 | 7 | 0 | 2 | 0 | 5 | 0 | 81 | 1 |
| Minnesota United | 2021 | MLS | 9 | 0 | – | | – | | – | | 9 | 0 |
| HJK | 2022 | Veikkausliiga | 23 | 0 | 1 | 0 | 13 | 0 | 3 | 0 | 40 | 0 |
| HJK | 2023 | Veikkausliiga | 20 | 0 | 0 | 0 | 10 | 0 | 5 | 0 | 35 | 0 |
| HJK | Total | | 43 | 0 | 1 | 0 | 23 | 0 | 8 | 0 | 75 | 0 |
| Gnistan | 2024 | Veikkausliiga | 26 | 0 | 0 | 0 | – | | 3 | 0 | 29 | 0 |
| Gnistan | 2025 | Veikkausliiga | 0 | 0 | 0 | 0 | – | | 3 | 0 | 3 | 0 |
| Gnistan | Total | | 26 | 0 | 0 | 0 | 0 | 0 | 6 | 0 | 32 | 0 |
| Career total | | | 385 | 3 | 18 | 0 | 34 | 0 | 21 | 0 | 458 | 3 |

=== International ===
As of match played on 21 June 2021.

Finland
| Year | Apps | Goals |
|---|---|---|
| 2009 | 1 | 0 |
| 2010 | 1 | 0 |
| 2011 | 8 | 0 |
| 2012 | 6 | 0 |
| 2013 | 6 | 0 |
| 2014 | 2 | 0 |
| 2015 | 2 | 0 |
| 2016 | 10 | 0 |
| 2017 | 3 | 0 |
| 2018 | 5 | 0 |
| 2019 | 7 | 0 |
| 2020 | 2 | 0 |
| 2021 | 8 | 0 |
| Total | 61 | 0 |

== Honours ==
=== Club ===
HJK Helsinki

- Veikkausliiga: 2009, 2022, 2023
- Finnish Cup: 2008
- Finnish League Cup: 2023

Montreal Impact

- Canadian Championship: 2019

=== Individual ===
- 2009: Finland U21 Player of the Year
