= Ricki Olsen =

Danish footballer (born 1988)

Personal information
- Date of birth: 21 October 1988 (age 38)
- Place of birth: Hundige, Denmark
- Position: Midfielder

Team information
- Current team: VB 1968
- Number: 6

Youth career
- Brøndby

Senior career*
Years	Team	Apps	(Gls)
2008–2012	Randers	52	(4)
2011	→ Viborg (loan)	8	(0)
2012	Næstved	4	(1)
2012–2014	Nordvest	56	(12)
2014–2018	Helsingør	110	(17)
2018–2019	HB Køge	29	(1)
2019–2020	Helsingør	16	(0)
2020–2022	Ishøj IF		
2023	Slagelse B&I		
2023–	VB 1968		

International career
2009	Denmark U-21	2	(1)

Managerial career
- 2023: Slagelse B&I (player-assistant)
- * Club domestic league appearances and goals

Ricki Olsen (born 21 October 1988) is a Danish professional footballer. He is the son of the former Denmark national team player Lars Olsen.

== Career ==
Olsen started his career with Brøndby IF, but did not play any senior games for the team. Randers FC signed Olsen from Brøndby IF in the summer of 2008. Olsen got his first match on 26 October against Aalborg BK. Olsen played 75 minutes before being replaced by teammate Alain Behi. Olsen got his first goal for the club on 1 March against AGF when he scored the winning goal from about 30 yards out. The game ended 2–1.

In January 2012, he signed a contract with Næstved BK in the 1st Division. He then played for Nordvest FC and FC Helsingør.

In the summer of 2018 he left FC Helsingør following the club's relegation from the Danish Superliga. He then signed a contract with HB Køge in the Danish 1st Division. He returned to FC Helsingør for the 2019–20 season.

On 29 July 2020, it was confirmed, that Olsen had joined Ishøj IF in the Denmark Series. He left the club at the end of 2022. In February 2023, Olsen joined Slagelse B&I as an playing assistant manager. In August 2023, Olsen moved to VB 1968.
