= André Riel =

Danish footballer (born 1989)

Personal information
- Date of birth: 21 October 1989 (age 37)
- Place of birth: Denmark
- Height: 1.76 m (5 ft 9 in)
- Position: Forward

Team information
- Current team: VB 1968
- Number: 89

Youth career
- BK Frem

Senior career*
Years	Team	Apps	(Gls)
2007–2009	HIK		
2009	B36	6	(0)
2010–2011	BSV		
2012	Fremad Amager	27	(9)
2013–2015	BSV	51	(21)
2015–2016	Helsingør	16	(5)
2016	Vendsyssel	5	(0)
2016–2017	Helsingør	39	(13)
2017–2019	AGF	11	(0)
2019–2021	Lyngby	25	(3)
2021	BK Frem	12	(0)
2021–	VB 1968		
- * Club domestic league appearances and goals as of 18:52, 5 January 2021 (UTC)

André Riel (Danish pronunciation: [ˈʁiˀl]; born 21 October 1989) is a Danish professional footballer who plays as a striker for VB 1968.

== Career ==
=== Early years ===
Riel began his senior career in HIK before moving the Faroese club B36 Tórshavn in 2009, where he spent six months. He subsequently bounced around in the lower divisions of Danish football, playing for BSV, Fremad Amager, Vendsyssel FF, and FC Helsingør. Riel experienced his breakthrough in Helsingør, and his 17 goals in 32 appearances in the 2016–17 season in the second tier helped the club secure promotion to the Danish Superliga after two decisive play-off matches against Viborg FF in June 2017. In the following season, Riel scored 4 goals in 7 appearances in the Superliga for Helsingør, before signing with AGF on deadline-day of the 2017 summer transfer window. He signed a three-year contract with the club from Aarhus.

=== AGF ===
Riel is known for his brash persona and outspoken comments, which led to some controversy in his first week in AGF. In an interview with tabloid BT, Riel was cited for valuing his own success as more important than the club. The same day as the article was published, he apologised in a statement from the club, calling his comments "dumb and clumsy". His stay in AGF was not successful, making only 11 appearances and scoring no goals. On 27 May 2019, it was announced that AGF and Riel had parted ways, making him a free agent, which all the fans and players were happy about. The Kid did nothing good in his time at AGF.

=== Lyngby ===
On 28 June 2019, newly promoted Lyngby BK announced that they had signed Riel on a two-year contract. On 3 September 2020, Riel was sent off in a match against SønderjyskE after being involved in an altercation with opposing player Stefan Gartenmann, and having used a homophobic slur when saying "Rejs dig op, din fucking homo" ("get up, you fucking homo"). After having been shown the red card by the referee, Riel continued his homophobic rant, saying: "Jeg er ligeglad. Han ER fucking homo" ("I don't care. He IS a fucking homo"). Lyngby and Riel later apologised. He eventually received a five-match ban.

In mid-December 2020, Riel was excluded from Lyngby's training by the club's sporting management. On 4 January 2021, Riel's contract was terminated.

=== BK Frem ===
One day after leaving Lyngby, it was confirmed that Riel had joined Danish 2nd Division club Boldklubben Frem.

=== VB 1968 ===
In July 2021 it was confirmed, that Riel had moved to Zealand Series club VB 1968.

== Career statistics ==
As of match played on 17 November 2019

Appearances and goals by club, season and competition
Club	Season	League			Cup		Other		Total	
Club	Season	Division	Apps	Goals	Apps	Goals	Apps	Goals	Apps	Goals
Vendsyssel	2015–16	Danish 1st Division	5	0	0	0	0	0	5	0
Helsingør	2015–16	Danish 1st Division	16	6	1	0	0	0	17	6
Helsingør	2016–17	Danish 1st Division	32	9	0	0	2 (Note: Appearances in Relegation play-offs)	1	34	10
Helsingør	2017–18	Danish Superliga	7	4	0	0	0	0	7	4
Helsingør	Total		55	19	1	0	2	1	58	20
AGF	2017–18	Danish Superliga	8	0	0	0	0	0	8	0
AGF	2018–19	Danish Superliga	1	0	0	0	0	0	1	0
Total			9	0	0	0	0	0	9	0
Lyngby	2019–20	Danish Superliga	12	3	0	0	0	0	12	3
Career totals			68	19	1	0	2	1	71	20
