= Ante Björkebaum =

Swedish footballer

Personal information
- Full name: Ante Björkebaum
- Date of birth: 14 April 1988 (age 38)
- Place of birth: Sweden
- Position: Forward

Senior career*
Years	Team	Apps	(Gls)
2007–2008	Ope IF	2	(0)
2009–2010	Östersunds FK	45	(13)
2011–2017	IK Sirius	102	(49)
- * Club domestic league appearances and goals

Ante Björkebaum (born 14 April 1988) is a Swedish retired footballer.
