= Quincy Antipas =

Zimbabwean footballer (born 1984)

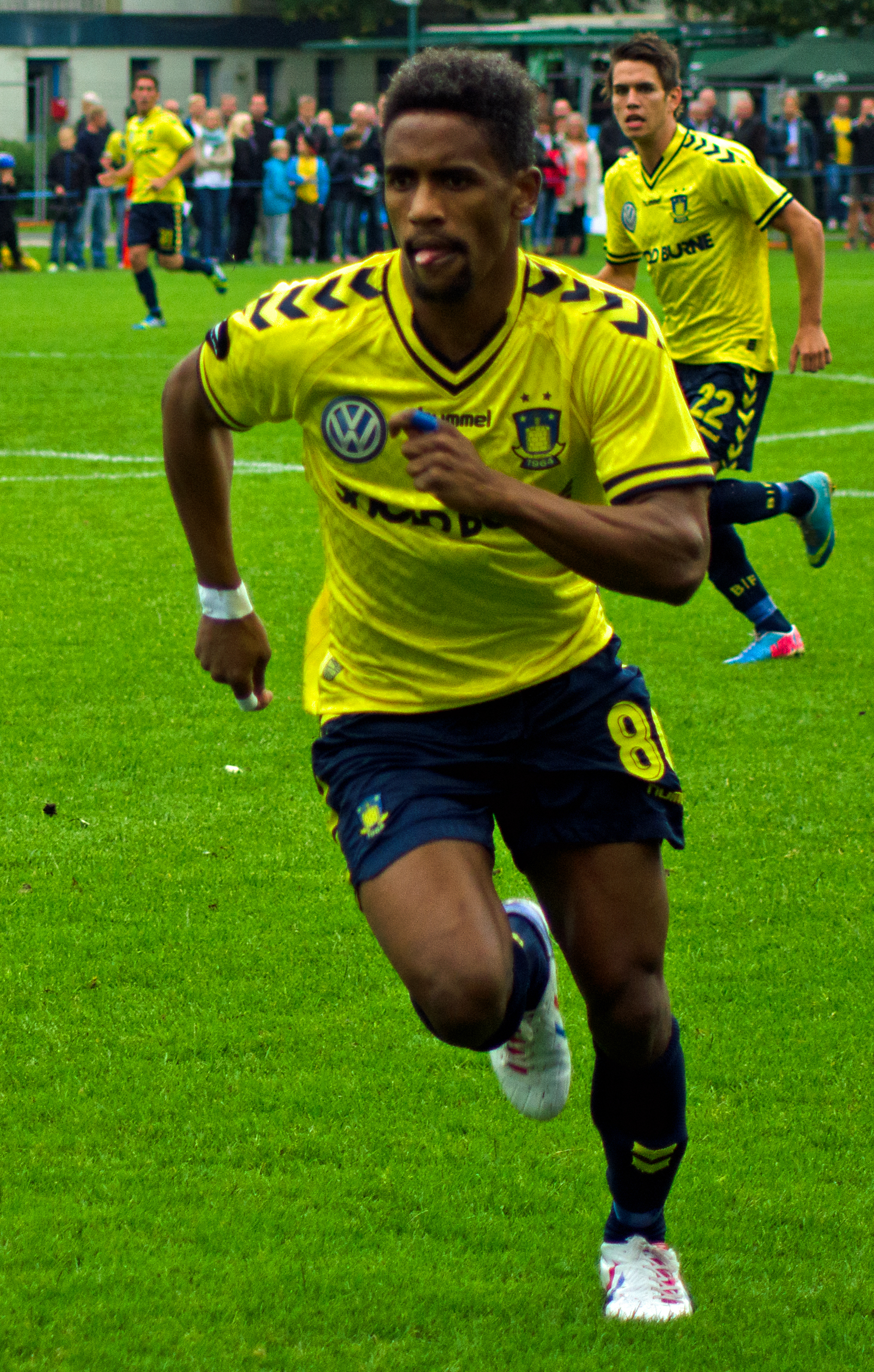
- Antipas with Brondby

Personal information
- Date of birth: 20 April 1984 (age 42)
- Place of birth: Harare, Zimbabwe
- Height: 1.68 m (5 ft 6 in)
- Positions: Winger; striker

Senior career*
| Years | Team | Apps | (Gls) |
| 2003 | Motor Action | | |
| 2004–2005 | CAPS United | | |
| 2006 | Motor Action | | |
| 2006–2007 | Moghreb Tétouan | | |
| 2007–2008 | MAS Fez | | |
| 2008–2009 | Blokhus | 35 | (14) |
| 2010 | HB Køge | 13 | (3) |
| 2010–2012 | SønderjyskE | 63 | (16) |
| 2012–2014 | Brøndby | 46 | (6) |
| 2014–2018 | Hobro | 80 | (13) |
| 2019 | B.93 | 9 | (0) |
| 2019–2020 | VB 1968 | | |
| 2020 | Skovshoved | 3 | (1) |
| 2021 | VB 1968 | | |

International career
| 2006–2011 | Zimbabwe | 7 | (0) |
- * Club domestic league appearances and goals

Quincy Antipas (born 20 April 1984) is a Zimbabwean retired footballer who played as a forward.

== Career ==
Born in Harare, Antipas has played club football in Zimbabwe, Morocco and Denmark for Motor Action, CAPS United, Moghreb Tétouan, MAS Fez, Blokhus, HB Køge and SønderjyskE. He signed for Brøndby on 3 September 2012. Just thirteen days after signing for Brøndby, on 16 September 2012, he made his league debut for the club, a 2–2 home draw with AC Horsens. He was replaced by Frederik Holst in the 74th minute. He scored his first league goal for the club on 28 October 2012 in the 81st minute of a 1–1 away draw against FC Midtjylland. He moved to Hobro, also in Denmark, in July 2014. He made his league debut for Hobro on 20 July 2014 in a 2–1 away win over Odense Boldklub. He was brought on for Emil Berggreen in the 55th minute. He scored his first league goal for the club on 10 August 2014 in a 3–0 away win over F.C. Copenhagen. His goal, the first of the match, came in the 7th minute. Antipas left Hobro IK at the end of his contract, at the end of 2018.

He made his international debut for Zimbabwe in 2006, and has appeared in FIFA World Cup qualifying matches for them.

On 1 February 2019, Antipas signed with Danish 2nd Division club B.93 until the summer 2020. He left the club in July 2019. In August 2019, he then joined Denmark Series club VB 1968.

In September 2021, Antipas returned to VB 1968.

== Career statistics ==
As of match played on 1 April 2018

Appearances and goals by club, season and competition
| Club | Season | League | | | National Cup | | Other | | Total | |
| Club | Season | Division | Apps | Goals | Apps | Goals | Apps | Goals | Apps | Goals |
|---|---|---|---|---|---|---|---|---|---|---|
| HB Køge | 2009–10 | Danish Superliga | 13 | 3 | 0 | 0 | 0 | 0 | 13 | 3 |
| SønderjyskE | 2010–11 | Danish Superliga | 27 | 5 | 0 | 0 | 0 | 0 | 27 | 5 |
| SønderjyskE | 2011–12 | Danish Superliga | 29 | 9 | 3 | 3 | 0 | 0 | 32 | 12 |
| SønderjyskE | 2012–13 | Danish Superliga | 7 | 2 | 0 | 0 | 0 | 0 | 7 | 2 |
| SønderjyskE | Total | | 63 | 16 | 3 | 3 | 0 | 0 | 66 | 19 |
| Brøndby | 2012–13 | Danish Superliga | 21 | 5 | 4 | 1 | 0 | 0 | 25 | 6 |
| Brøndby | 2013–14 | Danish Superliga | 25 | 1 | 0 | 0 | 0 | 0 | 25 | 1 |
| Brøndby | Total | | 46 | 6 | 4 | 1 | 0 | 0 | 50 | 7 |
| Hobro | 2014–15 | Danish Superliga | 26 | 5 | 0 | 0 | 0 | 0 | 26 | 5 |
| Hobro | 2015–16 | Danish Superliga | 5 | 0 | 0 | 0 | 0 | 0 | 5 | 0 |
| Hobro | 2016–17 | Danish 1st Division | 11 | 0 | 0 | 0 | 0 | 0 | 11 | 0 |
| Hobro | 2017–18 | Danish Superliga | 25 | 6 | 1 | 0 | 0 | 0 | 26 | 6 |
| Hobro | Total | | 67 | 11 | 1 | 0 | 0 | 0 | 68 | 11 |
| Career total | | | 189 | 36 | 8 | 4 | 0 | 0 | 197 | 40 |
