= Nicolaj Agger =

Danish footballer (born 1988)

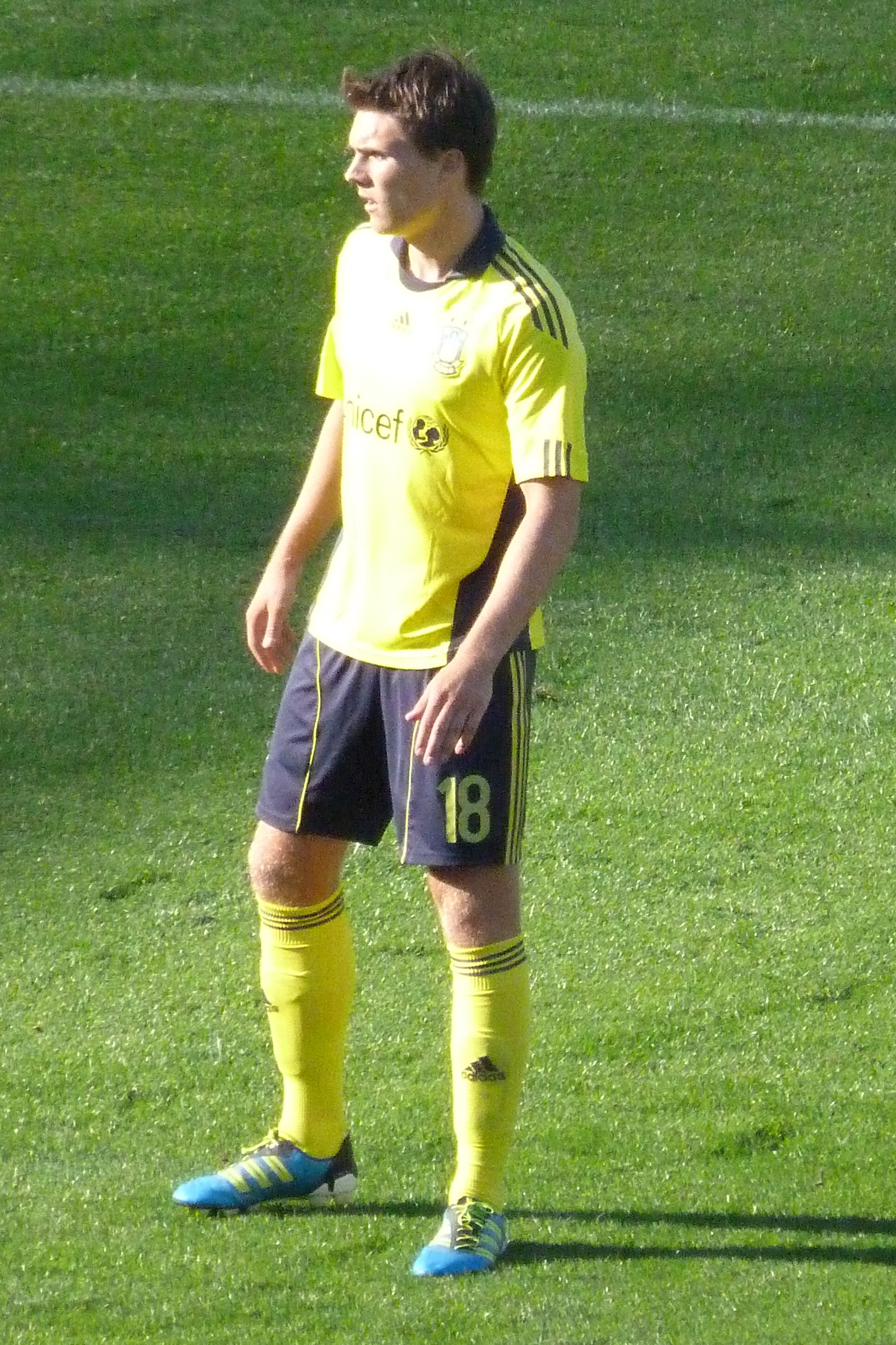
- Agger playing for Brøndby in 2011

Personal information
- Full name: Nicolaj Moesgaard Agger
- Date of birth: 23 October 1988 (age 38)
- Place of birth: Hvidovre, Denmark
- Height: 1.85 m (6 ft 1 in)
- Position: Forward

Youth career
- Brøndby

Senior career*
Years	Team	Apps	(Gls)
2006–2012	Brøndby	59	(9)
2009	→ SønderjyskE (loan)	8	(2)
2011	→ Djurgården (loan)	7	(1)
2012–2013	Vejle-Kolding	23	(6)
2013–2014	Vejle	30	(8)
2014–2017	Silkeborg	76	(11)
2017–2021	Hvidovre	99	(38)

International career
2004–2005	Denmark U17	12	(5)
2006	Denmark U18	1	(0)
2006–2007	Denmark U19	7	(3)
2008–2011	Denmark U21	10	(2)
- * Club domestic league appearances and goals

Nicolaj Moesgaard Agger (Danish pronunciation: [ˈɑkɐ]; born 23 October 1988) is a Danish retired footballer who played as a forward. He is cousin to former international Daniel Agger.

== Biography ==
Agger is the younger cousin of former Danish international defender Daniel Agger, which has coined his nickname "Fætter Agger" meaning "Cousin Agger".

== Club career ==
=== Brøndby IF ===
Agger started playing youth football with Brøndby IF, and was included in various Danish national youth teams, making his debut for the Denmark under-17 team in August 2004. Playing in the Brøndby reserve team, he made his senior debut for Brøndby IF in August 2006, replacing Morten "Duncan" Rasmussen and scoring two goals in the 4–0 victory over FC Flora Tallinn in the second qualification round of the UEFA Cup, after being subbed on in the beginning of the second half. Agger made his Danish Superliga debut in an October 2006 matchup against AaB.

In the summer of 2007, Agger was officially promoted to the first team squad. He made nine league appearances for Brøndby in his first two seasons.

==== Loan to SønderjyskE ====
On 2 September 2009 it was announced, that SønderjyskE had signed Agger a 4-month loan deal. In November 2009, Agger broke his ankle in a match against HB Køge and was ruled out for six months. While Agger was loaned out to SønderjyskE, Brøndby would extend his contract until December 2013.

On 20 May 2011, he scored two goals against Lyngby Boldklub in a Danish Superliga game. After his return from a loan spell at SønderjyskE, Agger became a regular part of the Brøndby squad and played 26 league games in the 2012–13 season. However, during the season, he received less and less playing time, and he would eventually leave the club on loan once again.

==== Loan to Djurgårdens IF ====
On 31 August 2011, Agger joined Swedish club Djurgårdens IF on loan to the end of the season with a buying obligation. Agger scored in his debut against Trelleborg, a match which his team would win 4–3. Djurgårdens did not trigger his release clause, and he returned to Brøndby after seven league appearances for Djurgården.

After his loan spell at Djurgårdens IF, Agger stated, that he was not interested in another loan. Either he would play for Brøndby, otherwise he would be leaving the club.

=== Vejle ===
On 6 August 2012 Agger moved to Vejle-Kolding on a 3-year deal. In his second season at the club, he was mostly used on the left wing position.

=== Silkeborg ===
On 29 June 2014, Vejle Boldklub announced that Agger had been sold to newly promoted Silkeborg IF a year before the end of his contract. Vejle later revealed, that they had to sell him in order to acquire other players.

In October 2016, Agger suffered an anterior cruciate ligament injury to his left knee, which would rule him out for six months. Agger announced in May 2017, that he would leave the club after three seasons, when his contract expired in the summer. He also announced, that he probably would stay in Denmark.

=== Hvidovre IF ===
On 25 July 2017, Agger signed for Danish 2nd Division and hometown club Hvidovre IF. He reached promotion to the Danish 1st Division in his first season with Hvidovre, scoring 19 goals in 27 league appearances.

On 30 June 2021, 32-year old Agger announced his retirement from football.

== International career ==
Agger has played 30 matches for various Danish national youth teams and scored 10 goals.
