= Jean-Claude Bozga =

Romanian footballer (born 1984)

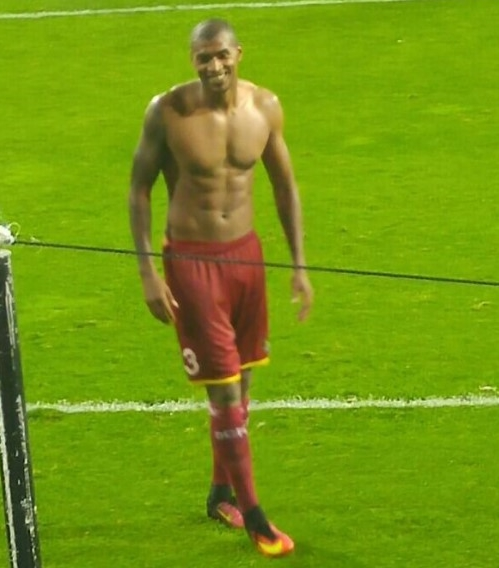
- Bozga with Daejeon Citizen in 2016

Personal information
- Full name: Jean-Claude Adrimer Bozga
- Date of birth: 1 June 1984 (age 42)
- Place of birth: Galați, Romania
- Height: 1.94 m (6 ft 4 in)
- Position: Centre-back

Youth career
- 1992–2002: Dunărea Galați

Senior career*
Years	Team	Apps	(Gls)
2002–2007	Dunărea Galați	107	(8)
2007–2011	Petrolul Ploiești	100	(14)
2011	Concordia Chiajna	16	(0)
2012–2013	Minsk	17	(0)
2013–2015	Vestsjælland	88	(6)
2016	Daejeon Citizen	37	(2)
2017–2020	HB Køge	83	(4)
2020	Ishøj	10	(1)
2021–2022	Slagelse B&I	13	(4)
Total		471	(39)
- * Club domestic league appearances and goals

Jean-Claude Adrimer Bozga (born 1 June 1984) is a Romanian former professional footballer who played as a centre-back. He announced his retirement in 2022.

== Personal life ==
Bozga was born in Galați to a Romanian mother and a Congolese father who studied in Romania.

== Career ==
Bozga moved to Vestsjælland in February 2013 after a successful trial. He won promotion to the Danish Superliga in his first season at the club. Bozga formed a partnership in central defense with Lasse Nielsen, and the duo allowed the fewest goals on headers of all Superliga-clubs early on in the season. After the club suffered relegation and later filed for bankruptcy in December 2015, Bozga signed with K-League club Daejeon Citizen from the K League 2.

On 30 June 2017, Bozga returned to Denmark where he signed with HB Køge after a successful trial. He signed a contract extension in December 2019, keeping him at the club until 2020.

Bozga moved to Ishøj IF in the Denmark Series on 29 July 2020. After six months, he returned to Slagelse B&I, the continuation of the bankrupt Vestsjælland.

In June 2022, Bozga announced his retirement from football. He founded his own company after retiring from professional football, J.C Bozga Construct ApS, which deals with renovation tasks, painting and masonry work.

== Honours ==
Petrolul Ploiești

- Liga II: 2010–11
