= Azer Bušuladžić =

Bosnian footballer (born 1991)

Personal information
- Full name: Azer Bušuladžić
- Date of birth: 12 November 1991 (age 34)
- Place of birth: Trebinje, SFR Yugoslavia
- Height: 1.87 m (6 ft 2 in)
- Position: Defensive midfielder

Youth career
- Kolding BK

Senior career*
Years	Team	Apps	(Gls)
2009–2014	Vejle	114	(8)
2014–2016	OB	60	(1)
2016–2017	Dinamo București	36	(0)
2017–2019	Atromitos	53	(0)
2019–2020	Arka Gdynia	14	(0)
2020	Atromitos	21	(0)
2021–2022	Anorthosis Famagusta	11	(0)
2022–2024	Vejle	43	(0)
- * Club domestic league appearances and goals as of 14 December 2023

Azer Bušuladžić (born 12 November 1991) is a Bosnian professional footballer who plays as a defensive or central midfielder.

== Club career ==
Bušuladžić was born on 12 November 1991 in Trebinje, Bosnia and Herzegovina, and at the age of four, due to the Bosnian war he immigrated with his family to Denmark. From 2009 to 2014 he played in Vejle Boldklub (114 appearances in all competitions) and in the 2014 he signed a two years' contract with OB (62 appearances in all competitions). During his period spent at Dinamo București (43 appearances in all competitions) he won the 2016–17 Cupa Ligii, which was the first trophy won by the club after 5 years. On 16 August 2017, he signed a two years contract with Greek Super League club Atromitos for an undisclosed fee.

On 23 May 2022, it was confirmed that Bušuladžić had returned to Vejle Boldklub, signing a deal until June 2024. On 13 March 2024, Vejle confirmed that they had terminated the agreement with Bušuladžić with immediate effect. The player stated that it was due to the lack of playing time.

== Career statistics ==
As of 22 March 2021

Appearances and goals by club, season and competition
Club	Season	League			National cup (Note: Includes Danish Cup, Cupa României, Greek Cup, Cypriot Cup)		Europe		Other		Total	
Club	Season	Division	Apps	Goals	Apps	Goals	Apps	Goals	Apps	Goals	Apps	Goals
Vejle Boldklub	2009–10	1st Division	15	1	5	0	—		—		20	1
Vejle Boldklub	2010–11	1st Division	23	1	0	0	—		—		23	1
Vejle Boldklub	2011–12	1st Division	22	3	5	1	—		—		24	3
Vejle Boldklub	2012–13	1st Division	28	2	3	0	—		—		30	2
Vejle Boldklub	2013–14	1st Division	16	1	1	0	—		—		17	1
Vejle Boldklub	Total		104	8	14	1	—		—		118	9
OB	2013–14	Superliga	10	0	0	0	—		—		10	0
OB	2014–15	Superliga	25	0	0	0	—		—		25	0
OB	2015–16	Superliga	25	1	2	0	—		—		27	1
OB	Total		60	1	2	0	—		—		62	1
Dinamo București	2016–17	Liga I	33	0	2	0	—		4 (Note: Appearances in Cupa Ligii)	0	39	0
Dinamo București	2017–18	Liga I	3	0	—		1 (Note: Appearance in UEFA Europa League)	0	—		4	0
Dinamo București	Total		36	0	2	0	1	0	4	0	43	0
Atromitos	2017–18	Super League Greece	26	0	5	0	—		—		31	0
Atromitos	2018–19	Super League Greece	27	0	2	0	1	0	—		30	0
Atromitos	Total		53	0	7	0	1	0	—		61	0
Arka Gdynia	2019–20	Ekstraklasa	14	0	0	0	—		—		14	0
Atromitos	2019–20	Super League Greece	14	0	2	0	—		—		16	0
Atromitos	2020–21	Super League Greece	7	0	—		—		—		7	0
Atromitos	Total		21	0	2	0	—		—		23	0
Anorthosis	2020–21	Cypriot First Division	10	0	1	0	—		—		11	0
Career total			298	9	28	1	2	0	4	0	332	10

== Honours ==
Dinamo București

- Cupa Ligii: 2016–17

Anorthosis Famagusta

- Cypriot Cup: 2020–21

Vejle

- Danish 1st Division: 2022–23
