= Motorring 4 =

Ring road

Route information
- Length: 15 km (9.3 mi)

Location
- Country: Denmark

Highway system
- Transport in Denmark; Motorways

Motorring 4 (O4) is a motorway ring road that runs from Ishøj to Ballerup. It is followed by Ring 4 which goes on to Kongens Lyngby. The motorway connects the motorways Køge Bugt Motorway, Holbæk Motorway and Frederikssund Motorway.

In November 2003, a majority in the Folketing agreed on a traffic package, which meant that the drafting of a decision-making basis for expanding the motorway from 4 to 6 lanes had to be initiated. In July 2009, a significant part of the decision-making basis for a construction act was completed for approx. 4 km long stretch between Motorvejskrys Taastrup and the connecting facility between Motorring 4 and Frederikssund motorway. The expansion was to be completed in about 5 years, of which the last 3 were construction work. The motorway was laid out with an extra-wide central relief with trees, which should tie the forest landscape together across the motorway. Therefore, the expansion can be carried out by extension with tracks in the existing central rebate.
