= Adnan Mohammad =

Danish-born Pakistani footballer (born 1996)

Personal information
- Full name: Adnan Mohammad Yaqoob
- Date of birth: 2 July 1996 (age 30)
- Place of birth: Copenhagen, Denmark
- Height: 1.77 m (5 ft 10 in)
- Position: Winger

Team information
- Current team: FC Gladsaxe
- Number: 4

Youth career
- 2007–2013: Lyngby
- 2013–2015: Nordsjælland

Senior career*
Years	Team	Apps	(Gls)
2015–2017	Nordsjælland	11	(0)
2017	Arendal	12	(1)
2017–2018	Helsingør	36	(3)
2018–2019	Lyngby	26	(4)
2020–2021	Ishøj IF		
2021	GVI		
2021–2022	KFUM Roskilde	8	(0)
2022–	FC Gladsaxe		

International career^{‡}
2018–2023	Pakistan	9	(0)
- * Club domestic league appearances and goals as of 15:52, 17 November 2022 (UTC) ‡ National team caps and goals as of 17 July 2023

Adnan Mohammad Yaqoob (born July 2, 1996) is a footballer who play as a winger for Zealand Series club FC Gladsaxe. He previously played for Danish Superliga clubs Lyngby BK, FC Nordsjælland and Norwegian club Arendal. Born in Denmark, he represented Pakistan at international level.

== Club career ==
=== Nordsjælland ===
Mohammad was permanently moved to the first team squad in the summer 2015, at the age of 18 and got his contract extended.

On 27 September 2015, Mohammad made his Superliga debut in a match against AGF, which FCN won 2–0, where he came on the pitch in the 85th minute, replacing Marcus Ingvartsen.

=== Arendal ===
After only 11 league games for FCN, Mohammad moved to the Norwegian club Arendal on 30 March 2017.

Mohammad played his first match for the club on 9 April 2017 against Ull/Kisa. After only 3 months, his contract was terminated and Mohammad revealed that he found it hard to settle down in a new country and that he wanted to get back to Denmark.

=== Helsingør ===
On 13 July 2017, Mohammad signed for newly promoted Danish Superliga-side FC Helsingør.

=== Lyngby ===
On 1 September 2018, Lyngby Boldklub announced the signing of Mohammad on a four-year deal. He reached promotion to the Danish Superliga during his first season at the club.

==== Gambling addiction and contract termination ====
On 19 November 2019, with three years left of his contract, Lyngby announced that Mohammad would leave the club at the end of the year by mutual agreement for personal reasons. In January 2020 it was revealed that Mohammad had borrowed money from several teammates in order to cover his betting debt, which was the reasons behind him being released by Lyngby. Mohammad had borrowed such a big sum that he could not recompense them, which caused the rest of the team to turn against him. Furthermore, Lyngby's head coach, Christian Nielsen, had loaned him 5,500 DKK and Mohammad had also contacted younger players in the squad via social medias, asking to borrow money. One of the youth players had allegedly loaned him around 50,000 DKK, after Mohammad had claimed that he was going to use the money to pay for a wedding.

In February 2020, Mohammad participated in a mini-documentary about his release and gambling addiction, where he said: My life is ruined. You can't get any deeper than this, but it's my own fault. I don't want pity from people because I've cheated them and lied to them, but I'm going to make up for it if I just get a second chance and get my career going again. Mohammad also said that at the moment, there had been no interest for him from any other clubs and that he agreed to part ways with Lyngby, even though he had the right to stay for the last three years of the contract.

=== Ishøj ===
On 3 March 2019, Ishøj IF from the Denmark Series confirmed, that Mohammad had signed for the club. Mohammad had been training with the club since his departure from Lyngby.

=== GVI ===
In the summer 2021, he joined fellow league club GVI.

=== KFUM ===
However, already two months later - on 1 September 2021 - Mohammad joined the Danish 3rd Division club KFUM Roskilde. On 2 March 2022, the club confirmed that they had terminated Mohammad's contract after failing to get him fit since his arrival.

=== VB 1968 ===
On 11 March 2022, Mohammad signed with Zealand Series club VB 1968, after being on a training camp with the club in Turkey for 14 days. The head coach Mohamad El Faour, declared his intention to first play Adnan as a right-back, in order to steadily recover his previous Superliga form. He was also placed on a strict diet in order to recover his fitness and lose weight.

In January 2024, the club changed name to FC Gladsaxe.

== International career ==
Adnan Mohammad was selected by Pakistan national football team for 2018 SAFF Championship but could not feature because his visa was not issued by the Bangladeshi authorities. He finally made his debut for the national team on November 16, 2018, in a 2-1 friendly loss against Palestine in which he assisted the only goal scored by Hassan Bashir.

== Career statistics ==
=== Club ===
As of 15 November 2018

Appearances and goals by club, season and competition
Club	Season	League		Cup (Note: Includes Danish Cup, Norwegian Football Cup)		Total	
Club	Season	Apps	Goals	Apps	Goals	Apps	Goals
FC Nordsjælland	2015–16	1	0	0	0	1	0
FC Nordsjælland	2016–17	10	0	2	2	12	2
FC Nordsjælland	Total	11	0	2	2	13	2
Arendal	2017	12	1	2	0	14	1
Arendal	Total	12	1	2	0	14	1
FC Helsingør	2017–18	31	3	2	0	33	3
FC Helsingør	2018–19	5	0	1	0	6	0
FC Helsingør	Total	36	3	3	0	39	3
Lyngby	2018–19	25	4	0	0	25	4
Lyngby	Total	11	2	0	0	11	2
Career Total		70	6	7	2	77	8

=== International ===
As of match played 28 June 2023

Appearances and goals by national team and year
National team	Year	Apps	Goals
Pakistan	2018	2	0
Pakistan	2019	2	0
Pakistan	2023	5	0
Total		9	0

== See also ==
- List of Pakistan international footballers born outside Pakistan
