= Lasse Kryger =

Danish footballer (born 1982)

Personal information
- Date of birth: November 3, 1982 (age 44)
- Place of birth: Denmark
- Height: 1.88 m (6 ft 2 in)
- Position: Midfielder

Senior career*
| Years | Team | Apps | (Gls) |
| –2002 | Svendborg FB | | |
| 2002–2003 | B 1913 | | |
| 2003–2006 | Esbjerg fB | 61 | (9) |
| 2006–2009 | Viborg FF | 82 | (18) |
| 2009–2010 | FC Fredericia | 30 | (6) |
| 2010–2014 | AC Horsens | 106 | (19) |
| 2014–2016 | OB | 32 | (3) |
| 2016–2018 | AC Horsens | 57 | (7) |
- * Club domestic league appearances and goals

Lasse Kryger (born 3 November 1982) is a Danish retired professional football midfielder. He has previously played for Svendborg FB, B 1913, Esbjerg fB, Viborg FF and FC Fredericia.

== Club career ==
=== Viborg FF ===
Kryger played for Svendborg FB, B 1913 and Esbjerg fB, before joining Viborg FF in 2003. He started his career as a forward but was used as a right back when he came to Viborg. On June 11, 2009, Viborg FF announced on its website, that the Kryger's contract not would be extended as the club must have cut in the number of players due to the lack of promotion to the Danish Superliga. However, Kryger was mad at the club for holding him in the club, and let him play at the Denmark Series team in spring 2009. He said that the club should have told him in December 2008, that they didn't want to extend his contract, so he could have found a new club, instead of not saying anything and keeping him on their reserve team. During his time in the club, he played several positions; right back, left midfielder and forward.

=== FC Fredericia ===
After leaving Viborg, Kryger signed for FC Fredericia in the summer 2009.

=== AC Horsens ===
After one good season at FC Fredericia, he was sold to AC Horsens in summer 2010, where he signed a three-year contract. Kryger suffered from many injuries in his first year at the club. His contract was extended in April 2013 until the summer 2014 and once again in December 2013, this time until summer 2016. He became the topscorer of the team in his last season with 12 league goals from his right midfielder position.

=== OB ===
On 16 June 2014 it was confirmed, that OB had signed Kryger on a 2-year contract.

=== Return to AC Horsens ===
Kryger re-joined AC Horsens in January 2016.

Kryger decided to retire at the end of 2018. This was announced on 14 December 2018.
