= Slagelse Stadium =

Sports center in Slagelse, Denmark

Harboe Arena Slagelse
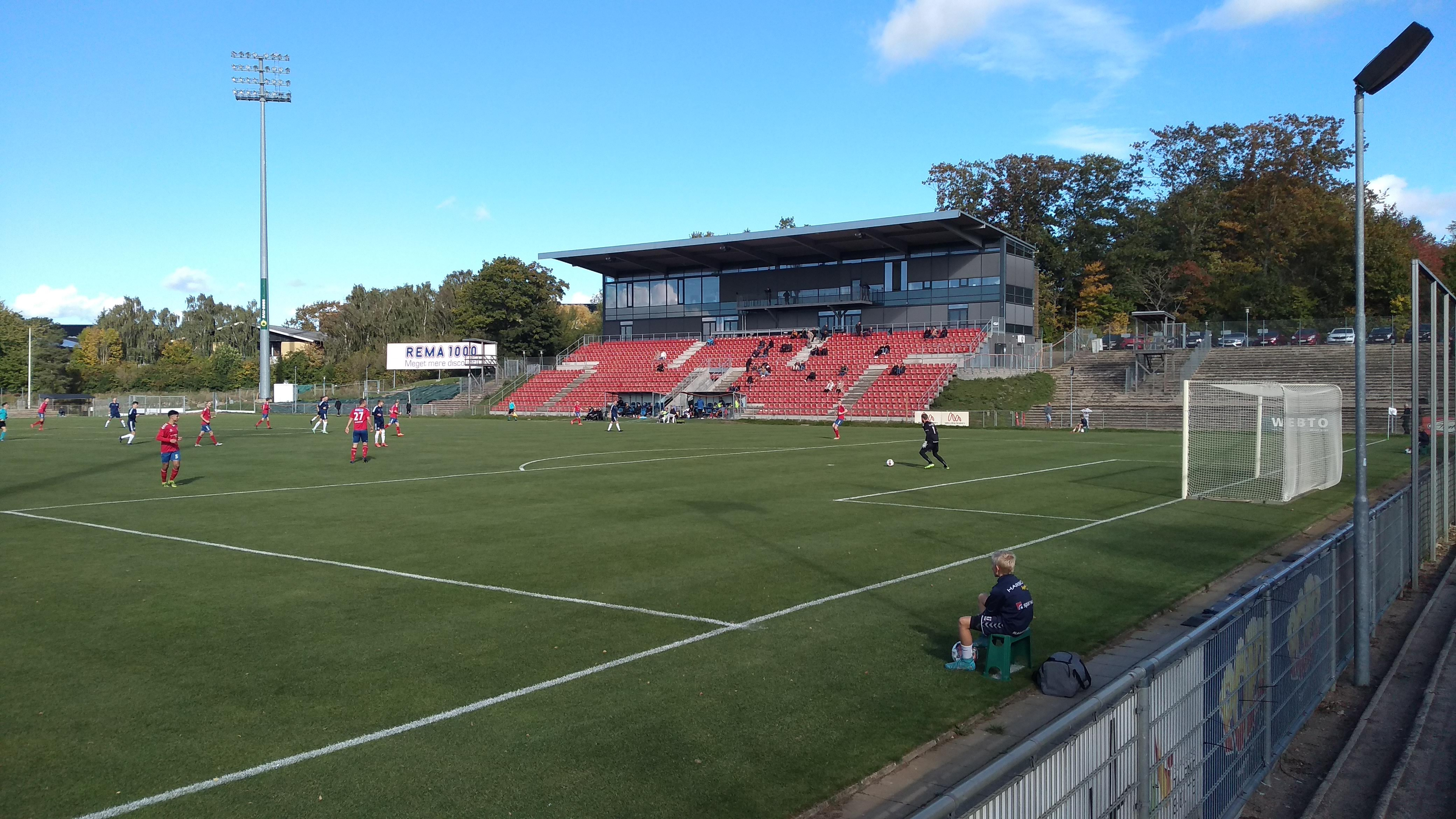
- Interactive map of Harboe Arena Slagelse
- Location: Parkvej 41, DK-4200 Slagelse, Denmark
- Coordinates: 55°23′58″N 11°21′51.40″E
- Owner: Slagelse Municipality
- Operator: Slagelse B&I
- Capacity: 10,000 (3,300 seats)
- Surface: Grass
- Record attendance: 9,023 (vs. Holbæk B&I, 1973)
- Field size: 105 by 68 metres (114.8 yd × 74.4 yd)

Construction
- Opened: 1927
- Renovated: 2012–2013

Tenants
- Slagelse B&I (1927–present); FC Vestsjælland (2008–2015); Næstved BK (2024)

Slagelse Stadium (Danish: Slagelse Stadion; currently known as Harboe Arena Slagelse for sponsorship reasons) is a sports center located in Slagelse, Denmark, which, among other things, is used for athletics and the running of football matches on the associated stadium, including home games for Slagelse B&I. Formerly, its elite project FC Vestsjælland also used the stadium as its home ground.

The sports complex was built in 1927 by Slagelse Municipality, among others, as a result of the complete merging of Slagelse Boldklub and Slagelse Idræts-Forening to Slagelse B&I i 1919. The stadium has a capacity of 10,000, of which 3,300 are seating. The stadium record of 9,023 spectators dates back to the early 1970s, when it hosted with a division match in Danish top tier between Slagelse B&I and Holbæk B&I.

== Rebuilding ==
In 2012, the stadium was rebuilt to include heating in the field, new lighting, new stands, among other improvements.
