= Nicolas Sandberg =

Swedish footballer

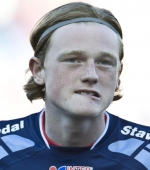
- Sandberg playing for Örgryte IS

Personal information
- Full name: Nicolas Gunvarson Sandberg
- Date of birth: December 24, 1991 (age 34)
- Place of birth: Sweden
- Height: 1.80 m (5 ft 11 in)
- Position: Forward

Team information
- Current team: Lindome GIF

Senior career*
Years	Team	Apps	(Gls)
2009–2011	Örgryte IS	53	(11)
2012–2014	FC Vestsjælland	40	(13)
2013	→ Vendsyssel FF (loan)	15	(1)
2014–2015	Örgryte IS	10	(2)
2015	Qviding FIF	23	(3)
2016	Utsiktens BK	21	(3)
2017–2019	Lindome GIF	11	(1)

International career
2009	Sweden U19	2	(0)
- * Club domestic league appearances and goals

Nicolas Gunvarson Sandberg (born 24 December 1991) is a Swedish former footballer who played for Örgryte IS, FC Vestsjælland, Vendsyssel FF, Qviding FIF, Utsiktens BK, and Lindome GIF as a forward. Sandberg also made 2 international appearances for Sweden U19's.
