= Henrik Madsen =

Danish footballer (born 1983)

Personal information
- Date of birth: 25 February 1983 (age 43)
- Place of birth: Denmark
- Height: 1.87 m (6 ft 1 1/2 in)
- Position: Midfielder

Senior career*
Years	Team	Apps	(Gls)
2002–2004	Køge Boldklub	53	(12)
2004–2005	AGF	14	(0)
2005–2011	Næstved BK	185	(31)
2011–2015	FC Vestsjælland	121	(8)
2016–2019	HB Køge	106	(0)

International career
	Denmark U-20	4	(3)
- * Club domestic league appearances and goals as of 9 March 2019

Henrik Nyholm Madsen (born 25 February 1983) is a Danish retired footballer. He previously played at FC Vestsjælland.
