= Osama Akharraz =

Danish footballer (born 1990)

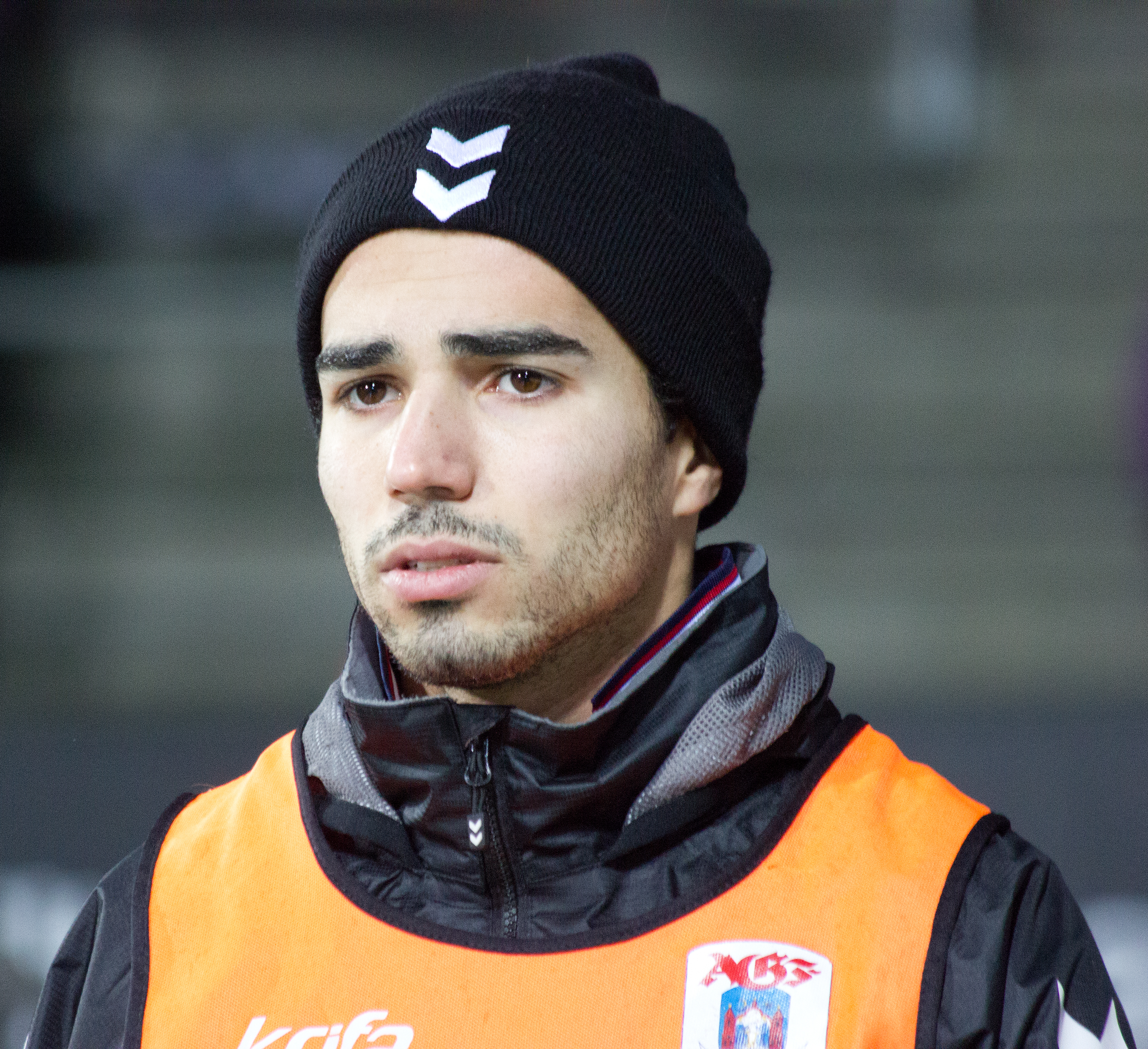
- Akharraz in 2013

Personal information
- Date of birth: 26 November 1990 (age 35)
- Place of birth: Copenhagen, Denmark
- Height: 1.75 m (5 ft 9 in)
- Position: Winger

Team information
- Current team: VB 1968

Youth career
- –2007: BK Frem
- 2007–2010: Brøndby

Senior career*
Years	Team	Apps	(Gls)
2009–2011	Brøndby	14	(0)
2012–2014	AGF	78	(15)
2015	Vestsjælland	10	(2)
2015–2017	Viborg	24	(5)
2017–2018	Helsingør	7	(0)
2019	Helsingør	9	(0)
2020–2021	Ishøj	18	(9)
2023–	VB 1968	1	(0)

International career
2006	Denmark U16	2	(1)
2006–2007	Denmark U17	8	(0)
2007–2008	Denmark U18	5	(0)
2008–2009	Denmark U19	9	(0)
2011	Denmark U21	2	(0)
- * Club domestic league appearances and goals as of 14:59, 24 December 2023 (UTC)

Osama Akharraz (born 26 November 1990) is a Danish footballer who plays as a winger for Denmark Series club VB 1968.

== Club career ==
=== Brøndby ===
Akharraz joined Brøndby IF in 2008 from BK Frem. He played his first match for the club on 30 October 2008 against Holstebro Boldklub in a Danish Cup game. In early January 2009, he agreed a contract extension with the club and was promoted to the first team squad.

He made his league debut for Brøndby on 17 April 2011 in a 2–1 home defeat against Aalborg BK. On 4 August 2011, he scored two goals against SV Ried in the Europa League qualification as Brøndby won the game 4–2 but were knocked out of 2011–12 UEFA Europa League because of a previous 0–2 loss in Austria. Due to the lack of playing time, Akharraz left the club in January 2012.

=== AGF ===
On 1 January 2012, Akharraz moved to AGF Aarhus. After some problems fitting in the AGF team, he has had some strong performances in the spring 2012. In a home game against his former club Brøndby he scored two of the goals in the 5–1 victory.

After losing a match against SønderjyskE in April 2012, Akharraz wrote on his Twitter account, that the "Danish referees didn't have any balls". AGF gave Akharraz a reprimand and warning for his doing on the social medias, and he avoided further punishments from the Danish Football Association. Four days later, manager Peter Sørensen dropped Akharraz from the squad against F.C. Copenhagen explaining that Akharraz "over a longer period of time, had shown unattended behavior". Akharraz later stated that he accepted the manager's decision.

In January 2013, Akharraz was sent home from a training session, after repeatedly showing his dissatisfaction. According to the media, Akharraz was angry at the physical coach, Lars Rasmussen, who wanted to see more pace from the winger. In March 2013, Akharraz posted on his Twitter account, that he did not feel appreciated by AGF. This post resulted in a meeting with the club about his behavior on social media. Later the same day, apologised for his post citing "a moment of frustration".

In February 2014, Akharraz stated his intention leave the club in the summer. In August 2014, he received a warning for showing AGF fans the middle finger. A few days later, manager Morten Wieghorst announced, that Akharraz had to find a new club, because he did not have a future at AGF. Akharraz expressed his dissatisfaction with the announcement and explained the fans had abused him racially.

On 1 September 2014, AGF announced, that they had terminated the contract of the winger. The club did also announce, that Akharraz had rejected offers from three clubs including a German team.

After leaving AGF, Akharraz started training with Danish 2nd Division-club, Hvidovre IF. He later went on a one-week trial at FC St. Pauli in January 2015, without being offered a contract. One week later, he went on a one-week trial again, this time at Hansa Rostock. However, the club did not have the necessary economy, and could not sign Akharraz.

=== Vestsjælland ===
On 29 January 2015, FC Vestsjælland announced the signing of Akharraz on a free transfer after a successful trial. Akharraz signed a 6-months long contract. The CEO of FC Vestsjælland revealed at the end of the season, that they would like to keep Akharraz at the club. However, Akharraz had other plans and left the club again after only 6 months. He began playing matches for the reserves of Brøndby IF in the summer 2015.

=== Viborg ===
Akharraz signed a six-month contract with Viborg FF on 19 September 2015. The deal was extended for further 2 years in December 2015.

In April 2016, Akharraz suffered an anterior cruciate ligament injury to his left knee, which would rule him out for one year. He went back to training in January 2017. On the transfer deadline day, Viborg announced, that Akharraz' contract was terminated by mutual agreement, because the player wanted to move back to his family in Copenhagen.

=== Helsingør ===
Akharraz played from September 2017 to the summer of 2018 for the club. He later joined them again. It was announced on 18 January 2019, that he had signed once again with the club, and this time on a 6-month contract.

=== Ishøj ===
A month after announcing that he was going to retire from football, Akharraz joined Danish amateur club Ishøj IF. One month before the end of the 2020–21 season, Akharraz stepped back from Ishøj for personal reasons, it was revealed on 6 July 2021.

=== VB 1968 ===
In September 2023, Akharraz returned to football, as he signed for Denmark Series club VB 1968.
