= Kim Aabech =

Danish footballer (born 1983)

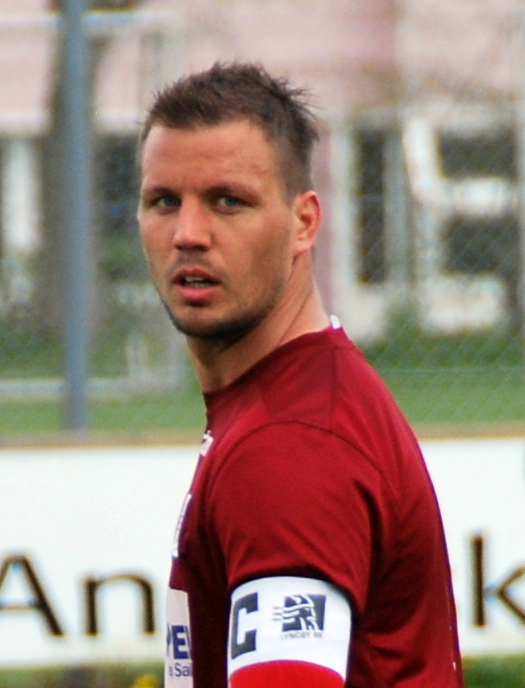
- Aabech with Lyngby in May 2012

Personal information
- Full name: Kim Engel Aabech
- Date of birth: 31 May 1983 (age 43)
- Place of birth: Birkholm, Denmark
- Height: 1.88 m (6 ft 2 in)
- Position: Forward

Youth career
- B.1903
- Virum-Sorgenfri

Senior career*
| Years | Team | Apps | (Gls) |
| 2002–2003 | Virum-Sorgenfri | | |
| 2003–2004 | Gladsaxe Hero | | |
| 2004–2013 | Lyngby | 239 | (75) |
| 2013–2014 | Nordsjælland | 30 | (8) |
| 2014–2016 | AGF | 51 | (23) |
| 2016–2017 | Horsens | 30 | (7) |
| 2017–2022 | Hvidovre | 144 | (40) |
| 2022 | VB 1968 | 17 | (5) |
| 2023 | Avarta | 12 | (2) |
| 2023–2024 | GVI | | |
| 2024–2025 | FC Gladsaxe | 20 | (10) |
| Total | | 543+ | (170+) |

International career
| 2008 | Denmark League XI | 2 | (0) |
- * Club domestic league appearances and goals

Kim Engel Aabech (Danish pronunciation: [ˈɔˌpek]; born 31 May 1983) is a Danish former professional footballer who played as a forward. His father is the former Danish international Hans Aabech.

== Career ==
=== Lyngby ===
After starting his senior career with lower-tier clubs Virum-Sorgenfri and Gladsaxe Hero, Aabech moved to Lyngby Boldklub in 2004 where he grew into a key player. During his tenure at the club, his reputation as a goalscorer grew and, together with Tobias Mikkelsen, Mikkel Beckmann and Christian Holst, he formed a formidable offensive, which played a major role in Lyngby's promotion from the 1st Division to the Superliga in the 2006–07 season. He scored his first Danish Superliga goal on 29 July 2007 against FC Nordsjælland. In the fall of 2008, Aabech was demoted to Lyngby's reserve team for a short period due to disciplinary problems. After the episode, he returned to the first team and became a contributing factor to the club's strong fall season.

=== Nordsjælland ===
On 4 July 2013, FC Nordsjælland announced that they had signed Aabech to a two-year contract. There, he was reunited with Kasper Hjulmand, who had previously coached during his time at Lyngby.

On 13 August 2014, Aabech left Nordsjælland again, as he had been dissatisfied with the lack of playing time under the new coach Ólafur Kristjánsson. To voice his frustration, he had told Kristjánsson in his office at the club facility in Farum that he would not show up at practice anymore. As a result, his contract was terminated, and he commented on the following on the episode: "It's actually quite simple for me, I want to play more consistently, and I had no prospect of that at FCN, as there are many good players. I have reached an age where playing time is incredibly important to me, and I wanted to do something about it."

=== AGF ===
Aabech signed a one-year contract with AGF as a free agent on 18 August 2014 and joined the club at the same time as new teammate Darnel Situ.

Aabech was one of the driving forces for AGF's team in the 2014–15 season and was one of the main reasons why AGF returned to the Superliga from the 1st Division. Jens Jønsson was officially named "Player of the Year" in AGF, but the fans eventually chose Aabech as "Fans' Player of the Year in AGF" via the fan site morethanaclub.dk, while Jønsson and Mate Vatsadze took 2nd and 3rd place, respectively.

When Glen Riddersholm took over as head coach, and the club signed club legend Morten "Duncan" Rasmussen, Aabech was left out of the starting lineup, and although he appeared as a substitute several times during spring of 2016, his contract was not extended.

=== Later career ===
After AGF's final match of the 2015–16 season against FC Copenhagen, Aabech announced that he moved to AC Horsens. There, he only played for one season, after which he did not receive a contract extension.

After leaving Horsens, Aabech signed with third-tier 2nd Division club Hvidovre IF in June 2017, where his father, Hans Aabech had also played. In June 2019, Aabech signed a contract extension with Hvidovre, who had meanwhile won promotion to the second-tier 1st Division. At that point he had scored 27 goals in 62 appearances for the club. 39-year old Aabech left Hvidovre at the end of the 2021–22 season.

On 27 June 2022, Aabech joined Denmark Series club VB 1968. In March 2023, 39-year old Aabech moved to Avarta in the same division.

In August 2023, 40-year old Aabech joined GVI. In the summer of 2024 he returned to VB 1968, which had changed its name to FC Gladsaxe since his last time at the club.
