= Rasmus Festersen =

Danish footballer (born 1986)

Personal information
- Full name: Rasmus Kanstrup Festersen
- Date of birth: 26 August 1986 (age 40)
- Place of birth: Viborg, Denmark
- Height: 1.78 m (5 ft 10 in)
- Position: Forward

Youth career
- Nørskovlund IF
- Kjellerup IF

Senior career*
Years	Team	Apps	(Gls)
2003–2007	Kjellerup IF		
2007–2008	Silkeborg IF	7	(1)
2008–2012	FC Vestsjælland	121	(75)
2012–2013	Oakleigh Cannons FC	6	(14)
2013–2015	FC Vestsjælland	71	(18)
2015–2019	OB	94	(30)
- * Club domestic league appearances and goals

Rasmus Festersen (born 26 August 1986) is a retired Danish footballer who played as an attacking midfielder.

== Football career ==
=== Silkeborg IF ===
Rasmus Festersen signed his first professional contract with Danish club Silkeborg IF who had invited him to try out for the team during the off season in the summer of 2007. Silkeborg manager Peder Knudsen said about Festersen: "Rasmus has done very well during the daily training and in friendly matches. We hope that he can develop his game even more as a full-time professional player, because he is undoubtedly a very exciting type. He is real "football-smart" and has some great offensive qualities.

Festersen got his debut on his 21st birthday, 26 August 2007, against Frem. He came on as a substitute in the 10th minute of the game replacing the injured Kim Olsen. Silkeborg won 3–2 and Festersen made a promising first appearance with an assist to fellow striker Simon Azoulay Pedersen goal, just six minutes after he went on the pitch.

On 5 September 2007, Festersen scored his first goal for the club helping Silkeborg to a 2–0 win against FC Svendborg in the Danish Cup.

=== FC Vestsjælland ===
During his brief time at Silkeborg IF, Festersen drew attention to himself as the fastest player in the squad., but eventually he failed to become a regular starter. After only six months at the club, he moved to lower ranking Slagelse B&I in January 2008, becoming one of the first signings after the club's newly set ambitions of returning to the top of Danish football within six years.

Festersen immediately became a big success scoring nine goals in 15 games in the spring of 2008 helping his club to a take fifth position in the 2nd Division East.

In the 2008–09 season, he scored 20 goals for the club, which had then changed their name to FC Vestsjælland. FC Vestsjælland won promotion to the Danish 1st Division, with Festersen honored as the 2nd Division East Player of the Year.

In January 2010, Festersen signed a new contract with FC Vestsjælland committing himself to the club until the summer of 2012.

=== Oakleigh Cannons FC ===
In April 2012, Rasmus Festersen and FC Vestsjælland announced that he would be leaving the club after the season to pursue a footballing career and to study in Australia. Later revealed that he will be playing for Oakleigh Cannons FC.

=== FC Vestsjælland ===
After 6 months away from FC Vestersjælland, Rasmus Festersen returned in January 2013. The club was promoted to the Danish Superliga in 2013, and Festersen had a big impact on the success of the club in the coming years which was highlighted by a Danish cup final in 2015 against FC Copenhagen, where Festersen was runner up after Thomas Deleyney as man of the match.

Festersen was afterward honored as the most valuable player in the history of FCV and was as captain and vice-captain a player that the board and management listened to.

=== Odense Boldklub ===
In 2015, Rasmus Festersen was sold to the Danish club Odense Boldklub and signed a 4-year contract. Festersen was given the number 10 and immediately became a favorite among the fans.

In his first season, Festersen scored 18 goals and was runner-up for the topscorer title in the league and nominated as vice-captain. A role he kept during his time in the club.

Rasmus Festersen scored 30 goals and made 12 assists in 94 games for Odense Boldklub in 94 games.

Odense Boldklub confirmed on 25 January 2019, that Festersen would retire at the end of the season.

As the first player in the club's history, Festersen was awarded the OB ambassadorship immediately after his retirement. The Commercial Director of Odense Boldklub made the following statement to justify the decision: "Rasmus has the complete package of everything we as a club could wish for in an ambassador. He is likeable, humble, and incredibly well-liked in and around the club and the city. He represents many of the same values as we do, which makes him a role model among players, fans, and sponsors. In addition, he is the first of his generation of new OB ambassadors to step straight off the pitch and into the ambassador corps, making him a popular face among younger OB fans"

== The Zorro Incident ==
On 6 November 2011 Rasmus Festersen was the centre of a bizarre red card during a match between FC Vestsjælland and Viborg FF. Festersen scored the first goal of the match and celebrated it by holding up a mask in front of his face. Having already been booked earlier in the match Festersen was then, to his own and the teammates' big surprise, shown a second yellow card and sent off.

After the match Festersen explained that the celebration was meant as a salute to some friends at home, but that he regretted his actions, as it gave the referee the chance to give him a second booking.

FC Vestsjælland's manager Ove Pedersen, however, showed support to his player and said: "I don't understand it. It's a ridiculous rule.". Eventually, Festersen received one match suspension for his red card.

Following the red card Festersen was often referred to as 'Zorro' in the Danish media, suggesting that the mask he wore was an imitation of the fictional character "Zorro".

A similar sending off happened to Brazilian footballer Neymar, who was also sent off for putting on a mask during a Copa Libertadores match.

== Local engagement ==
Rasmus Festersen has in his career been involved in local matters, charity and has had a voice in board and management in the clubs that he played, where he was often involved.

Rasmus Festersen wrote in February 2017 a chronicle in a newspaper where he criticised the facilities of Odense Boldklub. The mayor of the city took it very seriously and said: "A lot of respect to Rasmus Festersen who dare to interfere. It calls for a serious discussion",

In 2019, Odense Boldklub announced brand new facilities for the football team.

== Post-playing career ==
After ending his career in 2019, Festersen was offered a position as Director of PR & Communication in the Danish Software as a service company HR-ON Rasmus Festersen was a big part of the company's success and was promoted to CCO and ended as COO. Rasmus Festersen did keynotes and articles on how he sees the comparison between football and business leadership.

In 2021, he became CEO of the Danish Superliga club, SonderjyskE Fodbold.

In March 2022, Festersen was hired to a position as Investment Manager in Odense Municipality.

This led to that he in Festersen was appointed Chief Commercial Officer at Odense Robotics.

== Education ==
Alongside his career as a professional football player, Rasmus Festersen has studied for a degree in business at Roskilde University near Copenhagen and is also undergoing an Executive MBA. In an interview, Festersen said: "I choose to study, because I believe that you can use your mind for education and your legs playing soccer. Combining the two helps me stimulate my intellectual side as well as my physical needs, which eventually makes me become a better human being".
