= 2017–18 Danish Superliga =

28th season of Danish Superliga

Alka Superliga
- Season: 2017–18
- Dates: 14 July 2017 – 27 May 2018
- Champions: Midtjylland
- Relegated: Helsingør; Lyngby; Silkeborg
- Champions League: Midtjylland
- Europa League: Brøndby; Nordsjælland; Copenhagen
- Matches: 250
- Goals: 731 (2.92 per match)
- Top goalscorer: Pål Alexander Kirkevold (22 goals)
- Biggest home win: Nordsjælland 6–0 Horsens
- Biggest away win: Helsingør 0–4 København; Helsingør 1–5 AGF; Randers 0–4 Midtjylland
- Highest scoring: Brøndby 5–3 Lyngby

The 2017–18 Danish Superliga season was the 28th season of the Danish Superliga, which decides the Danish football championship. Copenhagen are the defending champions.

== Teams ==
Esbjerg fB finished as loser in the relegation play-offs in the 2016–17 season and was relegated to the 2017–18 1st Division along with Viborg FF who lost their relegation play-off as well.

The relegated teams were replaced by 2016–17 1st Division champions Hobro IK (returned after one year of absence) and 3rd-place finisher FC Helsingør (returned to the top division for the first time since the 1936–37 season), who defeated Viborg FF in the two legged play-off finals.

=== Stadia and locations ===
Locations of the Danish Superliga 2017–18 teams

Club	Location	Stadium	Turf	Capacity	2016–17 position
AaB	Aalborg	Aalborg Portland Park	Natural	13,797	10th
AGF	Aarhus	Ceres Park	Natural	20,032	11th
Brøndby	Brøndby	Brøndby Stadium	Hybrid	29,000	2nd
FCK	Copenhagen	Telia Parken	Natural	38,065	1st
Helsingør	Helsingør	Helsingør Stadion	Natural	4,500	1D, 3rd
Hobro	Hobro	DS Arena	Natural	10,700	1D, 1st
Horsens	Horsens	CASA Arena Horsens	Natural	10,400	13th
Midtjylland	Herning	MCH Arena	Natural	11,800	4th
Nordsjælland	Farum	Right to Dream Park	Artificial	9,900	5th
Lyngby	Lyngby	Lyngby Stadion	Natural	8,000	3rd
OB	Odense	EWII Park	Natural	15,633	8th
Randers	Randers	BioNutria Park Randers	Natural	12,000	7th
Silkeborg IF	Silkeborg	JYSK Park	Artificial	10,000	9th
SønderjyskE	Haderslev	Sydbank Park	Natural	10,000	6th

=== Personnel and sponsoring ===
Note: Flags indicate national team as has been defined under FIFA eligibility rules. Players and Managers may hold more than one non-FIFA nationality.

Team	Head coach	Captain	Kit manufacturer	Shirt sponsor
AaB	(Denmark) Morten Wieghorst	(Denmark) Rasmus Würtz	Hummel	Spar Nord
AGF	(Denmark) David Nielsen	(Denmark) Morten Rasmussen	Hummel	Ceres
Brøndby	(Germany) Alexander Zorniger	(Sweden) Johan Larsson	Hummel	Bet25.dk
København	(Norway) Ståle Solbakken	(Denmark) William Kvist	Adidas	Carlsberg
Helsingør	(Denmark) Christian Lønstrup	(Denmark) Andreas Holm Jensen	Diadora	Spar Nord
Hobro	(Denmark) Thomas Thomasberg	(Denmark) Mads Justesen	Puma	DS Gruppen, Spar Nord
Horsens	(Denmark) Bo Henriksen	(Denmark) Mathias Nielsen	Hummel	
Midtjylland	(Denmark) Jess Thorup	(Denmark) Jakob Poulsen	Nike	Det Faglige Hus
Nordsjælland	(Denmark) Kasper Hjulmand	(Denmark) Mathias Jensen	Diadora	DHL
Lyngby	(Denmark) Thomas Nørgaard	(Denmark) Mathias Tauber	Adidas	Hellerup Finans
OB	(Denmark) Kent Nielsen	(Denmark) Kenneth Emil Petersen	Hummel	Carlsberg
Randers	(Denmark) Rasmus Bertelsen	(Denmark) Mads Agesen	Puma	Verdo
Silkeborg	(Denmark) Peter Sørensen	(Denmark) Dennis Flinta	Uhlsport	Mascot International
SønderjyskE	(Denmark) Claus Nørgaard	(Denmark) Marc Pedersen	Hummel	Frøs Herreds Sparekasse

=== Managerial changes ===
Team	Outgoing manager	Manner of departure	Date of vacancy	Replaced by	Date of appointment	Position in table
AGF	(Denmark) Glen Riddersholm	Sacked	30 September 2017	(Denmark) David Nielsen	30 September 2017	7th
Lyngby	(Denmark) David Nielsen	Recruited by AGF	30 September 2017	(Denmark) Thomas Nørgaard	30 September 2017	12th
Randers	(Iceland) Ólafur Kristjánsson	Mutual consent	5 October 2017	(Netherlands) Ricardo Moniz	8 October 2017	14th
Randers	(Netherlands) Ricardo Moniz	Sacked	26 January 2018	(Denmark) Rasmus Bertelsen	26 January 2018	14th

== Regular season ==
=== League table ===
Pos	Team	Pld	W	D	L	GF	GA	GD	Pts	Qualification
1	Brøndby	26	18	6	2	58	24	+34	60	Qualification for the Championship round
2	Midtjylland	26	19	3	4	60	29	+31	60	Qualification for the Championship round
3	Nordsjælland	26	15	5	6	62	41	+21	50	Qualification for the Championship round
4	Copenhagen	26	13	5	8	50	33	+17	44	Qualification for the Championship round
5	Aalborg	26	8	12	6	28	27	+1	36	Qualification for the Championship round
6	Horsens	26	7	14	5	32	34	−2	35	Qualification for the Championship round
7	Hobro	26	8	8	10	33	33	0	32	Qualification for the Relegation round
8	SønderjyskE	26	8	7	11	36	34	+2	31	Qualification for the Relegation round
9	Odense	26	8	7	11	32	31	+1	31	Qualification for the Relegation round
10	Aarhus	26	7	8	11	23	36	−13	29	Qualification for the Relegation round
11	Silkeborg	26	8	4	14	32	49	−17	28	Qualification for the Relegation round
12	Lyngby	26	4	9	13	31	53	−22	21	Qualification for the Relegation round
13	Randers	26	4	8	14	23	46	−23	20	Qualification for the Relegation round
14	Helsingør	26	6	2	18	22	52	−30	20	Qualification for the Relegation round

Source: Danish Football Association (in Danish), Soccerway
Rules for classification: 1) Points; 2) Goal difference; 3) Goals scored; 4) Away goals scored; 5) Play-off (played on neutral ground if determining teams for different rounds); 6) Draw.

=== Results ===
Home \ Away	AAB	AGF	BRØ	COP	HEL	HOB	HOR	LYN	MID	NOR	ODE	RAN	SIL	SØN
AaB	—	0–0	1–1	1–1	1–0	1–1	1–1	3–1	0–1	1–1	0–2	4–0	2–1	1–4
AGF	0–0	—	2–0	0–1	0–0	2–0	1–2	0–2	0–3	1–4	0–0	1–4	3–1	0–0
Brøndby	0–0	2–2	—	1–0	6–1	2–1	2–0	5–3	4–0	4–2	2–1	3–1	4–1	4–0
Copenhagen	1–1	4–0	0–1	—	4–3	0–0	1–1	5–1	4–3	1–3	1–0	5–1	4–0	3–2
Helsingør	0–1	1–5	0–1	0–4	—	0–1	0–2	2–1	2–1	1–0	0–2	2–0	2–0	1–2
Hobro	0–1	0–1	1–2	0–2	2–1	—	1–1	3–0	1–2	4–0	1–1	2–0	1–1	3–2
Horsens	0–0	1–1	1–1	1–1	2–0	2–2	—	4–1	0–2	2–2	0–0	1–1	1–0	2–1
Lyngby	1–2	0–0	1–3	3–1	3–1	0–3	1–1	—	2–2	1–4	1–1	1–3	2–1	1–1
Midtjylland	4–1	4–0	0–1	3–1	2–1	5–1	4–2	1–1	—	4–3	3–1	2–1	2–0	2–1
Nordsjælland	3–2	1–2	3–2	3–0	1–0	3–2	6–0	2–2	1–1	—	2–1	3–2	3–1	2–2
Odense	0–0	0–1	1–1	1–0	6–1	3–0	1–0	3–1	0–2	1–2	—	3–1	1–2	0–3
Randers	1–1	1–0	0–0	0–3	0–0	0–0	0–1	0–0	0–4	0–3	4–1	—	1–1	0–2
Silkeborg	3–2	2–1	1–3	1–3	4–1	0–2	2–2	1–1	1–2	2–4	1–0	3–2	—	1–0
SønderjyskE	0–1	3–0	1–3	3–0	1–2	1–1	2–2	1–0	0–1	2–1	2–2	0–0	0–1	—

Source: Danish Football Association (in Danish)
Legend: Blue = home team win; Yellow = draw; Red = away team win.
For upcoming matches, an "a" indicates there is an article about the rivalry between the two participants.

=== Positions by round ===
Team ╲ Round	1	2	3	4	5	6	7	8	9	10	11	12	13	14	15	16	17	18	19	20	21	22	23	24	25	26
Brøndby	1	5	2	2	2	5	3	3	4	4	3	3	2	1	1	1	1	1	2	2	2	2	1	1	1	1
Midtjylland	14	10	5	8	4	2	4	4	3	2	2	2	1	2	2	2	2	2	1	1	1	1	2	2	2	2
Nordsjælland	5	2	1	1	1	1	1	1	1	1	1	1	3	3	3	3	3	3	3	3	3	3	3	3	3	3
Copenhagen	7	4	6	9	8	6	7	6	5	3	5	6	5	5	5	6	5	5	6	4	5	4	4	4	4	4
AaB	6	11	13	13	13	12	12	10	11	8	9	8	8	9	8	8	8	7	7	8	8	8	7	6	5	5
Horsens	3	1	3	3	3	3	5	5	6	6	4	4	6	7	6	5	7	8	5	7	4	5	5	5	6	6
Hobro	2	8	8	6	7	4	2	2	2	5	6	5	4	4	4	4	4	4	4	6	7	7	8	8	7	7
SønderjyskE	9	3	7	4	5	7	6	8	8	9	11	11	12	12	10	9	9	9	9	9	9	10	10	9	9	8
OB	12	6	4	5	6	8	8	7	9	7	7	7	7	6	7	7	6	6	8	5	6	6	6	7	8	9
AGF	10	7	9	10	11	10	10	11	7	10	8	10	10	10	12	11	11	11	11	11	11	11	11	11	10	10
Silkeborg IF	13	14	11	11	9	9	11	13	10	11	12	12	11	11	11	13	13	12	10	10	10	9	9	10	11	11
Lyngby Boldklub	4	9	12	12	12	13	13	12	12	12	10	9	9	8	9	10	10	10	12	12	12	12	12	12	12	12
Randers FC	8	12	14	14	14	14	14	14	14	14	14	14	14	14	14	12	12	13	14	14	14	13	13	13	13	13
Helsingør	11	13	10	7	10	11	9	9	13	13	13	13	13	13	13	14	14	14	13	13	13	14	14	14	14	14

Updated to match(es) played on 18 March 2018. Source: Weltfussball

== Championship round ==
Points and goals will carry over in full from the regular season.

Pos	Team	Pld	W	D	L	GF	GA	GD	Pts	Qualification	MID	BRØ	NOR	COP	AAB	HOR
1	Midtjylland (C)	36	27	4	5	80	39	+41	85	Qualification for the Champions League second qualifying round	—	2–3	2–1	3–2	3–0	1–0
2	Brøndby	36	24	9	3	82	37	+45	81	Qualification for the Europa League third qualifying round (Note: The highest-ranked team not already qualified for a UEFA competition progressed to the playoff match. As Brøndby IF finished in second place and also won the 2017–18 Danish Cup, F.C. Copenhagen advanced to the play-off match by virtue of its fourth place finish.)	0–1	—	3–1	2–1	1–1	5–1
3	Nordsjælland	36	17	8	11	76	58	+18	59	Qualification for the Europa League first qualifying round	1–2	3–4	—	0–0	3–1	2–1
4	Copenhagen (O)	36	17	7	12	65	47	+18	58	Qualification for the European play-off match	0–2	1–1	2–1	—	2–1	4–1
5	Aalborg	36	10	15	11	38	44	−6	45		3–3	0–3	0–0	1–0	—	2–0
6	Horsens	36	8	16	12	43	57	−14	40		0–1	2–2	2–2	2–3	2–1	—

Source: Danish FA
(C) Champions; (O) Play-off winners

=== Positions by round ===
Below the positions per round are shown. As teams did not all start with an equal number of points, the initial pre-playoffs positions are also given.

Team ╲ Round	Initial	1	2	3	4	5	6	7	8	9	10
Midtjylland	2	2	2	2	2	2	2	2	2	1	1
Brøndby	1	1	1	1	1	1	1	1	1	2	2
Nordsjælland	3	3	3	3	3	3	4	4	4	3	3
Copenhagen	4	4	4	4	4	4	3	3	3	4	4
AaB	5	5	5	5	5	5	5	5	5	5	5
Horsens	6	6	6	6	6	6	6	6	6	6	6

Updated to match(es) played on 21 May 2018. Source:

== Relegation round ==
Points and goals will carry over in full from the regular season.

=== Group A ===
Pos	Team	Pld	W	D	L	GF	GA	GD	Pts	Qualification or relegation	HOB	AGF	SIL	HEL
1	Hobro	32	12	8	12	41	39	+2	44	Qualification for the European play-off quarter-finals	—	1–3	1–0	4–1
2	Aarhus	32	11	8	13	35	43	−8	41	Qualification for the European play-off quarter-finals	0–1	—	2–1	2–1
3	Silkeborg (R)	32	9	5	18	39	60	−21	32	Qualification for the relegation play-offs	2–0	2–5	—	2–3
4	Helsingør (R)	32	8	3	21	28	61	−33	27	Qualification for the relegation play-offs	0–1	1–0	0–0	—

Source: Soccerway
Rules for classification: 1) Points; 2) Goal difference; 3) Goals scored; 4) Away goals scored; 5) Play-off.
(R) Relegated

=== Group B ===
Pos	Team	Pld	W	D	L	GF	GA	GD	Pts	Qualification or relegation	ODE	SØN	RAN	LYN
1	Odense	32	11	9	12	43	37	+6	42	Qualification for the European play-off quarter-finals	—	2–1	3–0	3–0
2	SønderjyskE	32	11	8	13	42	40	+2	41	Qualification for the European play-off quarter-finals	2–0	—	1–0	1–0
3	Randers (O)	32	7	9	16	32	52	−20	30	Qualification for the relegation play-offs	1–1	3–0	—	2–0
4	Lyngby (R)	32	4	11	17	35	65	−30	23	Qualification for the relegation play-offs	2–2	1–1	1–3	—

Source: Soccerway
Rules for classification: 1) Points; 2) Goal difference; 3) Goals scored; 4) Away goals scored; 5) Play-off.
(O) Play-off winners; (R) Relegated

== European play-offs ==
The winning team from the 4-team knock-out tournament advanced to a Europa League play-off match.

Semi-finals
6 and 13 May 2018
AGF Aarhus	3	3	6
OB Odense	2	2	4
6 and 13 May 2018
SønderjyskE (a)	1	2	3
Hobro	0	3	3

Final
17 and 22 May 2018
AGF Aarhus	2	2	4
SønderjyskE	2	0	2

=== European play-off match ===
25 May 2018

Copenhagen	4–1	AGF Aarhus
Santander 10'; Johansson 23'; Ankersen 51'; Fischer 76'		Stage 13'

Telia Parken, Copenhagen
Attendance: 16379
Referee: Michael Tykgaard

== Relegation play-offs ==
First round
Match 1
Helsingør	1	1	2
Randers	1	2	3
Match 2
Lyngby	2	2	4
Silkeborg	1	2	3

Second round
Match 3
Randers	2	2	4
Lyngby	1	1	2
Match 4
Helsingør	1	3	4
Silkeborg	1	4	5

Third round
Match 5
Lyngby	0	1	1
Vendsyssel FF	1	2	3
Match 6
Silkeborg	1	0	1
Esbjerg fB	0	3	3

Winners of matches 3, 5, and 6 would play in the 2018–19 Danish Superliga.

=== Second round ===
17 May 2018
18:00

Helsingør	1–1	Silkeborg
Douglas Starnley 14'		Nilsson 90+4'

Helsingør Stadium, Helsingør
Attendance: 2060
Referee: Jens Maae

21 May 2018
16:00

Silkeborg	4–3	Helsingør
Okkels 20'; Skhirtladze 24'; Nilsson 48'; Mattsson 86'		Matheus Leiria 4'; Douglas Starnley 64'; Mortensen 87'

JYSK Park, Silkeborg
Attendance: 5396
Referee: Anders Poulsen

Silkeborg won 5–4 on aggregate. As a result Helsingør was relegated, while Silkeborg would face Esbjerg fB in round 3 to avoid relegation.

=== Third round ===
24 May 2018
18:00

Vendsyssel FF	1–0	Lyngby
Anderson 23'

Hjørring Stadium, Hjørring
Attendance: 2800
Referee: Jørgen Burchardt

24 May 2018

Silkeborg	1–0	Esbjerg fB
Nilsson 72'

JYSK Park, Silkeborg
Attendance: 4949
Referee: Jens Maae

27 May 2018
16:00

Lyngby	1–2	Vendsyssel FF
Kjær 80'		Jensen 71'; Mikael Anderson 90+2'

Lyngby Stadium, Kongens Lyngby
Attendance: 5121
Referee: Anders Poulsen

Vendsyssel won 3–1 on aggregate. As a result Lyngby was relegated, and Vendsyssel promoted.

27 May 2018
18:00

Esbjerg fB	3–0	Silkeborg
Dreyer 76', 80', 90+3'	Report

Blue Water Arena, Esbjerg
Attendance: 7043
Referee: Peter Kjærsgaard-Andersen

Esbjerg won 3–1 on aggregate. As a result Silkeborg was relegated, and Esbjerg promoted.

== Top goalscorers ==
Rank	Player	Club	Goals
1	(Norway) Pål Alexander Kirkevold	Hobro	22
2	(Denmark) Emiliano Marcondes	Nordsjælland	17
2	(Finland) Teemu Pukki	Brøndby	17
4	(Ghana) Ernest Asante	Nordsjælland	16
5	(Denmark) Anders K. Jacobsen	OB	15
5	(Poland) Kamil Wilczek	Brøndby	15
7	(Cyprus) Pieros Sotiriou	Copenhagen	14
8	(Paraguay) Federico Santander	Copenhagen	12
8	(Georgia (country)) Saba Lobzhanidze	Randers	12
8	(Denmark) Mathias Jensen	Nordsjælland	12

== Attendances ==
No.	Club	Average	Highest
1	Brøndby IF	15,685	25,848
2	FC København	13,664	28,410
3	AGF	8,035	12,156
4	FC Midtjylland	7,812	11,432
5	AaB	5,408	7,595
6	OB	5,218	10,717
7	SønderjyskE	4,572	7,150
8	Silkeborg IF	3,885	9,411
9	FC Nordsjælland	3,825	10,124
10	Randers FC	3,741	8,113
11	AC Horsens	3,195	9,604
12	Hobro IK	2,553	4,546
13	Lyngby BK	2,252	4,445
14	FC Helsingør	2,133	5,308
