= 2022–23 Danish Superliga =

33nd season of Danish Superliga

Superliga
- Season: 2022–23
- Dates: 15 July 2022 – 9 June 2023
- Champions: Copenhagen
- Relegated: Horsens; AaB
- Champions League: Copenhagen
- Europa Conference League: Nordsjælland; AGF; Midtjylland
- Matches: 193
- Goals: 529 (2.74 per match)
- Top goalscorer: Gustav Isaksen (Midtjylland); 18 goals
- Biggest home win: Copenhagen 7–0 OB (5 March 2023)
- Biggest away win: OB 1–5 Midtjylland (29 July 2022)
- Highest scoring: Copenhagen 7–0 OB (5 March 2023); Copenhagen 4–3 AGF (21 May 2023)
- Longest winning run: Copenhagen (9 matches)
- Longest unbeaten run: Copenhagen (13 matches)
- Longest winless run: Lyngby (16 matches)
- Longest losing run: AaB (6 matches)
- Highest attendance: 32,678; Copenhagen vs. Viborg; 19 March 2022
- Lowest attendance: 2,682; Horsens vs. Lyngby; 25 July 2022
- Total attendance: 1,854,671
- Average attendance: 10,079

The 2022–23 Danish Superliga (officially the 3F Superliga for sponsorship purposes) was the 33rd season of the Danish Superliga. Copenhagen were the defending champions. The season began on 15 July 2022 and ended on 9 June 2023.

== Teams ==
Vejle and SønderjyskE finished the 2021–22 season in 11th and 12th place, respectively, and were relegated to the 2022–23 1st Division.

The relegated teams were replaced by 2021–22 1st Division Champions AC Horsens and second place Lyngby Boldklub, who both returned after one season's absence.

=== Stadiums and locations ===
Locations of the Danish Superliga 2022–23 teams

Club	Location	Stadium	Turf	Capacity	2021–22 position
AaB	Aalborg	Aalborg Portland Park	Hybrid	13,797	5th
AGF	Aarhus	Ceres Park	Hybrid	20,032	10th
Brøndby	Brøndby	Brøndby Stadium	Hybrid	29,000	4th
Copenhagen	Copenhagen	Parken	Hybrid	38,065	1st
Horsens	Horsens	CASA Arena Horsens	Natural	10,400	1D, 1st
Lyngby	Kongens Lyngby	Lyngby Stadium	Natural	8,000	1D, 2nd
Midtjylland	Herning	MCH Arena	Natural	11,800	2nd
Nordsjælland	Farum	Right to Dream Park	Artificial	9,900	9th
OB	Odense	Nature Energy Park	Natural	15,633	8th
Randers	Randers	Cepheus Park Randers	Natural	12,000	6th
Silkeborg	Silkeborg	JYSK Park	Artificial	10,000	3rd
Viborg	Viborg	Energi Viborg Arena	Hybrid	9,566	7th

=== Personnel and sponsoring ===
Note: Flags indicate national team as has been defined under FIFA eligibility rules. Players and Managers may hold more than one non-FIFA nationality.

Team	Head coach	Captain	Kit manufacturer	Shirt sponsor
AaB	(Sweden) Oscar Hiljemark	(Denmark) Lucas Andersen	Macron	Arbejdernes Landsbank
AGF	(Germany) Uwe Rösler	(Denmark) Patrick Mortensen	Hummel	Ceres
Brøndby	(Denmark) Jesper Sørensen	(Denmark) Kevin Mensah	Hummel	Booztlet
Copenhagen	(Denmark) Jacob Neestrup	(Greece) Zeca	Adidas	Unibet
Horsens	(Denmark) Jens Berthel Askou	(Denmark) Janus Drachmann	Hummel	NG ZINK A/S
Lyngby	(Iceland) Freyr Alexandersson	(Denmark) Kasper Enghardt	Adidas	Jetbull
Midtjylland	(Denmark) Thomas Thomasberg	(Denmark) Erik Sviatchenko	Nike	Det Faglige Hus
Nordsjælland	(Denmark) Johannes Hoff Thorup	(Denmark) Kian Hansen	Nike	DHL
OB	(Sweden) Andreas Alm	(Denmark) Jeppe Tverskov	Hummel	Albani
Randers	(Denmark) Rasmus Bertelsen	(Germany) Björn Kopplin	Puma	Verdo A/S
Silkeborg	(Denmark) Kent Nielsen	(Denmark) Nicklas Helenius	Uhlsport	JYSK
Viborg	(Denmark) Jacob Friis	(Denmark) Jeppe Grønning	Capelli Sport	Andelskassen

=== Managerial changes ===
Team	Outgoing manager	Manner of departure	Date of vacancy	Replaced by	Date of appointment	Position in table
AGF	(Denmark) David Nielsen	Mutual consent	30 June 2022	(Germany) Uwe Rösler	14 June 2022	Pre-season
Midtjylland	(Denmark) Bo Henriksen	Sacked	28 July 2022	(Spain) Albert Capellas	24 August 2022	10th
AaB	(Denmark) Lars Friis	Sacked	15 September 2022	(Sweden) Erik Hamrén	15 September 2022	11th
Copenhagen	(Denmark) Jess Thorup	Sacked	20 September 2022	(Denmark) Jacob Neestrup	20 September 2022	9th
Brøndby	(Denmark) Niels Frederiksen	Sacked	14 November 2022	(Denmark) Jesper Sørensen	2 January 2023	10th
Nordsjælland	(Denmark) Flemming Pedersen	Promoted to Technical Director	7 January 2023	(Denmark) Johannes Hoff Thorup	7 January 2023	1st
Midtjylland	(Spain) Albert Capellas	Sacked	14 March 2023	(Denmark) Thomas Thomasberg	23 March 2023	9th
AaB	(Sweden) Erik Hamrén	Sacked	20 March 2023	(Sweden) Oscar Hiljemark	20 March 2023	12th
Randers	(Denmark) Thomas Thomasberg	Signed by FC Midtjylland	23 March 2023	(Denmark) Rasmus Bertelsen	23 March 2023	5th

== Regular season ==
=== League table ===
Pos	Team	Pld	W	D	L	GF	GA	GD	Pts	Qualification
1	Nordsjælland	22	12	7	3	38	20	+18	43	Qualification for the Championship round
2	Copenhagen	22	13	3	6	45	22	+23	42	Qualification for the Championship round
3	Viborg	22	10	7	5	32	25	+7	37	Qualification for the Championship round
4	AGF	22	10	5	7	26	20	+6	35	Qualification for the Championship round
5	Randers	22	8	8	6	28	30	−2	32	Qualification for the Championship round
6	Brøndby	22	8	6	8	32	34	−2	30	Qualification for the Championship round
7	Silkeborg	22	8	5	9	34	35	−1	29	Qualification for the Qualification round
8	Midtjylland	22	6	10	6	32	29	+3	28	Qualification for the Qualification round
9	OB	22	7	7	8	27	38	−11	28	Qualification for the Qualification round
10	Horsens	22	6	5	11	26	37	−11	23	Qualification for the Qualification round
11	Lyngby	22	3	7	12	21	36	−15	16	Qualification for the Qualification round
12	AaB	22	3	6	13	18	33	−15	15	Qualification for the Qualification round

Source: Danish Football Association (in Danish), Soccerway
Rules for classification: 1) Points; 2) Goal difference; 3) Goals scored; 4) Away goals scored; 5) Play-off (played on neutral ground if determining teams for different rounds); 6) Draw.

=== Positions by round ===
Team ╲ Round	1	2	3	4	5	6	7	8	9	10	11	12	13	14	15	16	17	18	19	20	21	22
Nordsjælland	1	1	1	1	1	3	1	1	1	2	1	1	1	1	1	1	1	1	1	1	1	1
Copenhagen	11	5	8	5	8	5	8	6	6	9	6	7	7	8	6	3	3	3	3	2	2	2
Viborg	2	6	4	7	5	6	5	3	3	3	3	3	3	2	2	2	2	2	2	3	3	3
AGF	10	4	6	3	3	2	4	5	5	5	5	6	6	7	7	7	8	5	7	4	4	4
Randers	7	8	7	6	4	4	2	2	2	1	2	2	2	3	3	6	6	7	4	5	6	5
Brøndby	3	7	9	9	9	9	10	9	9	10	10	9	8	10	9	10	10	9	5	8	5	6
Silkeborg	6	3	2	2	2	1	3	4	4	4	4	4	4	4	5	4	4	8	8	6	7	7
Midtjylland	12	11	12	12	12	11	9	11	10	8	7	5	5	5	8	8	7	4	6	7	9	8
OB	4	2	3	4	6	7	6	7	7	6	9	10	9	6	4	5	5	6	9	9	8	9
Horsens	8	10	5	8	7	8	7	8	8	7	8	8	10	9	10	9	9	10	10	10	10	10
Lyngby	5	9	10	10	10	12	12	12	12	12	12	12	12	12	12	12	12	12	12	12	12	11
AaB	9	12	11	11	11	10	11	10	11	11	11	11	11	11	11	11	11	11	11	11	11	12

Source: Weltfussball

=== Results ===
Home \ Away	AAB	AGF	ACH	BRO	COP	LYN	MID	NOR	ODE	RAN	SIL	VIB
AaB	—	0–1	0–0	2–1	1–3	1–1	0–0	0–0	1–1	0–1	1–2	1–3
AGF	3–1	—	2–0	2–2	0–2	1–0	0–1	2–3	1–0	0–0	1–1	3–1
Horsens	0–0	2–1	—	0–2	1–4	1–0	3–3	1–0	3–3	5–1	3–2	0–3
Brøndby	3–2	1–0	5–2	—	1–1	3–3	0–2	1–3	2–0	2–2	2–1	0–2
Copenhagen	1–0	1–0	0–1	4–1	—	3–0	1–1	1–1	7–0	1–3	1–0	2–1
Lyngby	0–2	0–1	1–1	1–0	0–3	—	3–3	1–1	0–2	0–2	2–2	1–1
Midtjylland	0–2	0–2	2–1	0–1	2–1	1–3	—	0–0	1–2	1–1	1–3	1–1
Nordsjælland	5–1	1–1	2–0	2–1	3–1	2–1	1–1	—	4–2	3–1	0–2	1–0
OB	2–1	1–2	1–0	1–1	2–1	3–1	1–5	0–2	—	0–0	1–1	1–2
Randers	1–0	1–2	1–0	2–3	0–2	1–0	0–0	0–2	2–2	—	3–2	1–0
Silkeborg	3–1	1–0	2–1	2–0	0–3	0–2	3–3	2–1	1–2	3–3	—	1–2
Viborg	2–1	1–1	2–1	0–0	4–2	2–1	0–4	1–1	0–0	2–2	2–0	—

Updated to match(es) played on 19 March 2023. Source: soccerway.com
Legend: Blue = home team win; Yellow = draw; Red = away team win.

==== Results by round ====
Team ╲ Round	1	2	3	4	5	6	7	8	9	10	11	12	13	14	15	16	17	18	19	20	21	22
AaB	L	L	D	L	D	W	L	W	D	L	D	W	W	L	L	L	L	L	L	D	L	L
AGF	L	W	D	W	W	W	L	L	L	W	L	L	D	D	W	D	L	W	D	W	W	W
Brøndby	W	L	L	L	W	L	L	W	D	D	D	W	D	D	W	D	L	W	W	L	W	L
Copenhagen	L	W	L	W	L	W	L	W	L	L	W	D	D	D	W	W	W	W	W	W	W	W
Horsens	W	W	D	L	D	L	W	L	L	W	L	D	L	W	L	W	D	L	L	L	L	D
Lyngby	D	L	L	D	L	L	L	L	D	L	D	L	L	L	L	L	W	D	L	W	W	D
Midtjylland	D	L	W	D	D	L	W	L	D	W	D	W	W	D	L	D	D	W	L	D	L	D
Nordsjælland	W	W	W	W	D	L	W	W	D	L	W	D	D	W	W	D	W	D	W	L	D	W
OB	L	D	L	L	L	W	W	L	W	W	D	D	D	W	W	D	D	D	L	L	W	L
Randers	D	D	D	W	W	W	W	W	D	W	L	L	D	L	L	L	D	D	W	D	L	W
Silkeborg	D	W	W	W	L	W	L	L	W	L	W	D	D	L	L	W	L	L	D	W	L	D
Viborg	W	L	W	L	W	L	W	W	W	D	D	D	D	W	W	D	W	L	W	D	D	L

Source: Soccerway

== Championship round ==
Points and goals carried over in full from the regular season.

Pos	Team	Pld	W	D	L	GF	GA	GD	Pts	Qualification	COP	NOR	AGF	VIB	BRO	RAN
1	Copenhagen (C)	32	18	5	9	61	35	+26	59	Qualification for the Champions League second qualifying round	—	2–1	4–3	2–1	0–1	1–1
2	Nordsjælland	32	15	10	7	50	35	+15	55	Qualification for the Europa Conference League third qualifying round	3–2	—	0–1	0–0	2–1	3–1
3	AGF	32	14	9	9	42	31	+11	51	Qualification for the Europa Conference League second qualifying round	0–0	1–1	—	3–0	3–3	1–1
4	Viborg	32	14	9	9	44	35	+9	51	Qualification for the European play-off match	1–2	1–0	0–1	—	1–1	3–1
5	Brøndby	32	12	8	12	48	52	−4	44		1–3	5–1	1–0	0–3	—	0–4
6	Randers	32	10	11	11	40	47	−7	41		1–0	1–1	1–3	0–2	1–3	—

Source: Danish Football Association (in Danish), Soccerway
Legend: Blue = home team win; Yellow = draw; Red = away team win.
Rules for classification: 1) Points; 2) Goal difference; 3) Goals scored; 4) Away goals scored; 5) Play-off (played on neutral ground if determining teams for different rounds); 6) Draw.
(C) Champions

=== Positions by round ===
Below the positions per round are shown. As teams did not all start with an equal number of points, the initial pre-playoffs positions from round 22 are also given.

Team ╲ Round	22	23	24	25	26	27	28	29	30	31	32
Copenhagen	2	1	2	1	1	1	2	1	1	1	1
Nordsjælland	1	2	1	2	2	2	1	2	2	2	2
AGF	4	4	4	4	4	4	3	4	4	3	3
Viborg	3	3	3	3	3	3	4	3	3	4	4
Brøndby	6	6	6	6	6	6	6	6	6	5	5
Randers	5	5	5	5	5	5	5	5	5	6	6

== Qualification round ==
Points and goals carried over in full from the regular season.

Pos	Team	Pld	W	D	L	GF	GA	GD	Pts	Qualification or relegation	MID	ODE	SIL	LYN	ACH	AAB
1	Midtjylland (O)	32	13	12	7	55	39	+16	51	Qualification for the European play-off match	—	4–2	3–0	1–0	3–1	1–1
2	OB	32	12	10	10	47	53	−6	46		1–3	—	2–0	2–2	2–1	1–1
3	Silkeborg	32	11	8	13	44	49	−5	41		3–3	0–1	—	1–0	1–2	2–2
4	Lyngby	32	6	10	16	30	49	−19	28		2–1	0–4	1–1	—	2–1	2–1
5	Horsens (R)	32	7	7	18	33	58	−25	28	Relegation to Danish 1st Division	0–2	2–2	0–1	0–0	—	0–4
6	AaB (R)	32	6	9	17	34	45	−11	27	Relegation to Danish 1st Division	0–2	2–3	0–1	1–0	4–0	—

Source: Danish Football Association (in Danish), Soccerway
Legend: Blue = home team win; Yellow = draw; Red = away team win.
Rules for classification: 1) Points; 2) Goal difference; 3) Goals scored; 4) Away goals scored; 5) Play-off (played on neutral ground if determining teams for different rounds); 6) Draw.
(O) Play-off winners; (R) Relegated

=== Positions by round ===
Below the positions per round are shown. As teams did not all start with an equal number of points, the initial pre-playoffs positions are also given.

Team ╲ Round	22	23	24	25	26	27	28	29	30	31	32
Midtjylland	8	7	7	7	7	7	7	7	7	7	7
OB	9	9	8	8	8	8	8	8	8	8	8
Silkeborg	7	8	9	9	9	9	9	9	9	9	9
Lyngby	11	12	12	11	11	12	12	12	12	11	10
Horsens	10	10	10	10	10	10	10	11	11	12	11
AaB	12	11	11	12	12	11	11	10	10	10	12

== European play-offs ==
The 4th-placed team of the championship round advances to a play-off match against the winning team of the qualification round (no. 7) in a single-leg tie, with the team from the championship round as hosts. The winner earns a place in the Europa Conference League second qualifying round.

=== European play-off match ===
9 June 2023
19:00

Viborg	0–1	Midtjylland
	Report	Şimşir 65'

Energi Viborg Stadium, Viborg
Attendance: 8,356
Referee: Peter Kjærsgaard

== Season statistics ==
As of 21 May 2023

=== Top scorers and assists ===
Topscorers ranking
Rank	Player	Club	Goals
1	(Denmark) Patrick Mortensen	Aarhus GF	15
1	(Denmark) Gustav Isaksen	FC Midtjylland	15
3	(Sweden) Viktor Claesson	FC København	12
4	(Norway) Ohi Omoijuanfo	Brøndby IF	11
4	(Ghana) Ernest Nuamah	FC Nordsjælland	11
6	(Norway) Andreas Schjelderup	FC Nordsjælland	10
6	(Denmark) Tonni Adamsen	Silkeborg IF	10
8	(Netherlands) Jay-Roy Grot	Viborg FF	9
9	(Denmark) Anders Dreyer	FC Midtjylland	8
9	(Brazil) Allan Sousa	AaB	8
9	(Denmark) Bashkim Kadrii	OB	8
9	(Denmark) Nicolai Vallys	Brøndby IF	8
9	(Denmark) Mohamed Daramy	FC København	8

Assists ranking
Rank	Player	Club	Assists
1	(Denmark) Nicolai Vallys	Brøndby IF	7
2	(Denmark) Jacob Christensen	FC Nordsjælland	6
2	(Denmark) Brian Hämäläinen	Lyngby BK	6
2	(Brazil) Allan Sousa	AaB	6
5	(Denmark) Kasper Kusk	Silkeborg IF	5
5	(Denmark) Louka Prip	AaB	5
5	(Denmark) Anton Gaaei	Viborg FF	5
5	(Sweden) Kristoffer Olsson	FC Midtjylland	5
9	15 Players		4

== Attendances ==
#	Football club	Home games	Average attendance
1	FC København	11	28,860
2	Brøndby IF	11	19,141
3	Aarhus GF	11	14,558
4	Odense BK	11	9,731
5	FC Midtjylland	11	8,497
6	AaB	11	8,186
7	Viborg FF	11	6,439
8	Randers FC	11	6,380
9	Lyngby BK	11	6,059
10	FC Nordsjælland	11	5,776
11	Silkeborg IF	11	5,296
12	AC Horsens	11	4,458
