= 2010–11 Danish Superliga =

21st season of Danish Superliga

Danish Superliga
- Season: 2010–11
- Champions: F.C. Copenhagen
- Relegated: Randers FC, Esbjerg fB
- Ch. League: FC Copenhagen; OB
- Eur. League: Brøndby; Midtjylland; Nordsjælland (via dom. cup)
- Matches: 192
- Goals: 520 (2.71 per match)
- Top goalscorer: Dame N'Doye (25)
- Biggest home win: OB 6–0 AaB
- Biggest away win: Randers 0–4 Brøndby
- Highest scoring: Midtjylland 4–4 Lyngby
- Longest winning run: 7 (F.C. Copenhagen)
- Longest unbeaten run: 19 (F.C. Copenhagen)
- Longest losing run: 4 (Esbjerg fB, SønderjyskE)
- Highest attendance: 28,387 (F.C. Copenhagen v Brøndby IF)
- Lowest attendance: 1,017 (FC Nordsjælland v SønderjyskE at Parken)
- Average attendance: 7,049

The 2010–11 Danish Superliga season was the 21st season of the Danish Superliga championship, which decides the Danish football championship. It began on 17 July 2010 with the previous season's silver medalists from Odense facing Esbjerg and ended on 29 May 2011 with six simultaneous matches. F.C. Copenhagen secured the title when Odense lost 1-2 to Nordsjælland on 21 April 2011, for their ninth Danish championship.

Twelve teams were taking part in the tournament, facing each other three times for 33 matches total.

For the first time since the 1999–2000 Danish Superliga, the top two teams entered the qualification for the UEFA Champions League.

== Teams ==
Locations of the Danish Superliga 2010–11 teams

The top ten teams from the last season' Superliga and the top two teams from the last season's First Division participated.

Club	Finishing position last season	First season in top division	First season of current spell in top division
AaB	5th	1928–29	1987
AC Horsens	1st in 1st Division	1929–30	2010–11
Brøndby	3rd	1982	1982
Copenhagen	1st	1992–93	1992–93
Esbjerg	4th	1928–29	2001–02
Midtjylland	6th	2000–01	2000–01
Nordsjælland	7th	2002–03	2002–03
Lyngby	2nd in 1st Division	1980	2010–11
OB	2nd	1927–28	1999–2000
Randers	10th	1941–42	2006–07
Silkeborg	8th	1988	2009–10
SønderjyskE	9th	2000–01	2008–09

== League table ==
Pos	Team	Pld	W	D	L	GF	GA	GD	Pts	Qualification or relegation
1	Copenhagen (C)	33	25	6	2	77	29	+48	81	Qualification to Champions League third qualifying round
2	OB	33	16	7	10	55	41	+14	55	Qualification to Champions League third qualifying round
3	Brøndby	33	13	12	8	52	39	+13	51	Qualification to Europa League third qualifying round
4	Midtjylland	33	13	10	10	50	42	+8	49	Qualification to Europa League second qualifying round
5	Silkeborg	33	10	13	10	43	49	−6	43	
6	Nordsjælland	33	10	9	14	38	50	−12	39	Qualification to Europa League play-off round (Note: Nordsjælland won the 2010–11 Danish Cup competition and therefore qualified for the play-off round of the 2011–12 UEFA Europa League.)
7	SønderjyskE	33	11	6	16	32	46	−14	39	
8	Lyngby Boldklub	33	10	8	15	42	52	−10	38	
9	Horsens	33	9	10	14	29	40	−11	37	
10	AaB	33	8	11	14	38	48	−10	35	
11	Randers (R)	33	6	16	11	41	48	−7	34	Relegation to Danish 1st Division
12	Esbjerg (R)	33	7	12	14	36	49	−13	33	Relegation to Danish 1st Division

Source: Danish Football Association
Rules for classification: 1) points; 2) goal difference; 3) number of goals scored.
(C) Champions; (R) Relegated

== Results ==
=== Matchday 1–11 ===
Home \ Away	AaB	ACH	BIF	EfB	FCK	FCM	FCN	LBK	OB	RFC	SIF	SJE
AaB		2–3	0–2	0–2					1–2		0–0	0–2
Horsens				0–3	1–2	0–2			1–0	0–0		
Brøndby		0–1		1–1		1–0			2–2		0–2	3–1
Esbjerg fB					1–2	0–3	1–1	2–3		2–2	2–1	
Copenhagen	1–1		2–0				2–0	3–0		1–0	2–2	
Midtjylland	2–1				0–3		4–0	1–2		1–1	2–0	
Nordsjælland	0–0	3–0	1–3								4–1	1–2
Lyngby Boldklub	2–4	1–0	3–3				2–0					1–0
OB				3–0	2–3	2–1	0–1	3–1		1–1		
Randers FC	2–3		3–2				0–2	2–1				0–0
Silkeborg IF		1–2						2–2	3–1	1–1		3–1
SønderjyskE		2–0		3–0	1–3	0–2			1–3			

Source: Danish Football Association (in Danish)
Legend: Blue = home team win; Yellow = draw; Red = away team win.

=== Matchday 12–33 ===
Home \ Away	AaB	ACH	BIF	EfB	FCK	FCM	FCN	LBK	OB	RFC	SIF	SJE
AaB		0–0	1–2	1–1	0–1	2–0	2–0	2–1	0–1	4–1	1–1	1–2
Horsens	0–0		2–1	1–1	1–1	0–2	0–0	2–0	2–1	0–0	1–2	1–1
Brøndby	1–2	0–0		3–0	1–1	2–2	1–1	1–1	2–0	2–1	2–2	2–0
Esbjerg fB	0–0	2–1	1–2		1–1	0–1	2–0	0–0	1–2	1–3	1–1	0–1
Copenhagen	2–0	4–0	3–1	3–1		5–2	2–1	3–2	5–0	3–1	2–0	3–0
Midtjylland	2–2	1–0	1–0	2–2	2–0		2–2	4–4	1–1	2–2	2–1	2–1
Nordsjælland	3–3	2–1	1–1	1–2	1–3	0–0		2–1	1–4	2–1	3–2	1–1
Lyngby Boldklub	1–2	0–2	1–2	1–2	1–2	1–0	1–0		2–0	3–3	1–1	1–0
OB	6–0	3–3	1–1	1–0	3–0	3–2	1–2	2–0		1–0	0–0	1–2
Randers FC	0–0	1–0	0–4	2–2	0–3	1–1	4–0	1–1	1–2		4–0	0–0
Silkeborg IF	4–3	2–1	2–2	1–1	0–3	1–0	1–0	0–1	1–1	2–2		1–0
SønderjyskE	1–0	0–3	0–2	2–1	3–3	2–1	0–2	1–0	0–2	1–1	1–2	

Source: Danish Football Association (in Danish)
Legend: Blue = home team win; Yellow = draw; Red = away team win.

== Top goalscorers ==
Correct as of 19 May 2011

Rank	Player	Club	Goals
1	(Senegal) Dame N'Doye	F.C. Copenhagen	25
2	(Brazil) César Santin	F.C. Copenhagen	17
3	(Nigeria) Peter Utaka	OB	13
4	(Denmark) Kim Aabech	Lyngby Boldklub	12
4	(Denmark) Hans Henrik Andreasen	OB	12
6	(Denmark) Michael Krohn-Dehli	Brøndby IF	11
7	(Denmark) Mikkel Thygesen	FC Midtjylland	8
7	(Denmark) Frank Kristensen	FC Midtjylland/Randers FC	8
9	(Denmark) Matti Lund Nielsen	FC Nordsjælland	7
9	(Denmark) Martin Vingaard	F.C. Copenhagen	7
9	(Denmark) Nicolaj Agger	Brøndby IF	7
9	(Denmark) Kenneth Fabricius	SønderjyskE	7

== Managerial changes ==
Team	Outgoing manager	Manner of departure	Date of vacancy	Replaced by	Date of appointment	Position in table
Odense Boldklub	(Denmark) Lars Olsen	Sacked	14 September 2010	(Denmark) Uffe Pedersen (caretaker)	14 September 2010	4th
AaB	(Sweden) Magnus Pehrsson	Sacked	11 October 2010	(Denmark) Kent Nielsen	11 October 2010	12th
Odense Boldklub	(Denmark) Uffe Pedersen	End of tenure as caretaker	7 November 2010	(Denmark) Henrik Clausen	7 November 2010	3rd
Esbjerg fB	(Denmark) Ove Pedersen	Resigned	14 March 2011	(Denmark) Jess Thorup	14 March 2011	11th
FC Midtjylland	(Denmark) Allan Kuhn	Resigned	15 April 2011	(Denmark) Glen Riddersholm	15 April 2011	4th
Randers FC	(Denmark) Ove Christensen	Sacked	26 April 2011	(Denmark) Peter Elstrup (caretaker)	26 April 2011	10th

== Attendances ==
No.	Club	Average	Highest
1	FC København	17,325	28,387
2	Brøndby IF	12,849	18,113
3	OB	8,650	14,168
4	FC Midtjylland	7,212	11,051
5	AaB	6,992	11,725
6	Esbjerg fB	6,750	13,082
7	Randers FC	5,131	9,107
8	FC Nordsjælland	4,469	8,213
9	AC Horsens	4,196	7,370
10	Silkeborg IF	3,812	6,055
11	SønderjyskE	3,280	5,294
12	Lyngby BK	2,832	6,171
