= Andreas Jensen =

Andreas Jensen may refer to:

- Andreas Holm Jensen (born 1988), Danish footballer
- Andreas S. Jensen, singer-songwriter
