= Sabil Hansen =

Danish footballer (born 2005)

Personal information
- Full name: Sabil Osman Hansen
- Date of birth: 4 November 2005 (age 21)
- Place of birth: Denmark
- Position: Centre-back

Team information
- Current team: Randers
- Number: 24

Youth career
- B.93
- 2022–: Randers

Senior career*
| Years | Team | Apps | (Gls) |
| 2023– | Randers | 47 | (1) |

International career^{‡}
| 2024– | Denmark U20 | 5 | (0) |
| 2025– | Denmark U21 | 6 | (0) |
- * Club domestic league appearances and goals as of 19 May 2026 ‡ National team caps and goals as of 01:51, 2 April 2026 (UTC)

Sabil Osman Hansen (born 4 November 2005) is a Danish footballer who plays as a centre-back for Danish Superliga club Randers FC.

== Club career ==
=== Randers ===
In June 2022, Randers FC confirmed the signing of 16-year old Hansen from B.93, with the player signing a three-year deal. Hansen started on the club's U-19 team.

The good performances with the U-19 team was rewarded with Hansen sitting on the bench for five of Randers' Danish Superliga matches in the spring, before making his debut with a few minutes left in the match against FC Nordsjælland on 22 May 2023. A month earlier, it was also confirmed that Hansen would be promoted permanently to Randers' first team ahead of the upcoming 2023–24 season, while also signing a new three-year contract.

On 25 January 2025, Hansen extended his contract until June 2027.

== International career ==
In November 2024, Hansen was selected for the national team for the first time when he was part of the Danish under-20 national team that played two friendly matches. He made his debut against South Korea on 18 November 2024, where he got 60 minutes of playing time.

== Career statistics ==
As of match played 6 October 2024

| Club | Season | League | | | Danish Cup | | Continental | | Other | | Total | |
| Club | Season | Division | Apps | Goals | Apps | Goals | Apps | Goals | Apps | Goals | Apps | Goals |
|---|---|---|---|---|---|---|---|---|---|---|---|---|
| Randers | 2022-23 | Danish Superliga | 1 | 0 | 0 | 0 | — | | — | | 1 | 0 |
| Randers | 2023-24 | Danish Superliga | 6 | 0 | 0 | 0 | — | | 0 | 0 | 6 | 0 |
| Randers | 2024-25 | Danish Superliga | 5 | 0 | 2 | 0 | — | | — | | 7 | 0 |
| Career total | | | 12 | 0 | 2 | 0 | 0 | 0 | 0 | 0 | 14 | 0 |
