= 1982 Danish 1st Division =

37th season of Danish 1st Division

Danish 1st Division
- Season: 1982

The 1982 Danish 1st Division season was the 37th season of the Danish 1st Division league championship, governed by the Danish Football Association. It constituted the 69th edition of the Danish football championship, and saw Odense Boldklub win their second championship title.

The Danish champions qualified for the European Cup 1983-84 qualification, while the second and third placed teams qualified for the UEFA Cup 1983-84. The three lowest placed teams of the tournament were directly relegated to the Danish 2nd Division for the following season. Likewise, the Danish 2nd Division champions and two first runners-up were promoted to the 1st Division.

== Background ==
In the previous season, Hvidovre IF won their third league title after edging out Lyngby BK by a single point. Kastrup BK, Herfølge BK and Viborg FF were relegated. They were replaced by Brøndby IF, B 1909 and Kolding IF.

=== Format ===
The league was played on a double round-robin basis where each team played every other team once at home and once away. Two points were awarded for a win, one for a draw and none for a loss. Teams were ranked by total number of points and any ties were broken by goal difference. The league champions qualified for the 1983–84 European Cup. The runners-up and third paced team qualified for the 1983–84 UEFA Cup. The teams ranked 14th to 16th were relegated to the 1983 Danish 2nd Division.

== Summary ==
Going into the last round of matches on 14 November 1982, Odense BK and Aarhus GF were level on points with 39 points each but Aarhus GF held an advantage on goal difference by five goals – +24 to Odense BK's +19. Odense BK faced B 1901 at Odense Stadium and Aarhus GF played B 93 at Østerbro Stadium. Should both teams have won their last match, Aarhus GF would win the league unless Odense BK won by a margin at least six goals greater than Aarhus GF.

B 93 took an early lead against Aarhus GF through Jens Kolding and Odense BK took the lead against B 1901 shortly after thanks to a goal from Thorbjørn Sørensen – results which would hand Odense BK the title. However, Per Jensen equalised for B 1901 and Niels Peter Therkelsen equalised for Aarhus GF as both games were tied at 1–1 at half time leaving the advantage with Aarhus GF. Early second half goals from Vilhelm Munk Nielsen and Keld Bordingaard gave Odense BK a 3–1 lead. A Henning Jensen penalty gave Aarhus GF a 2–1 lead shortly after as the title race swung back in their favour. In a final twist, Keld Kristensen equalised for B 93 as they drew 2–2 with Aarhus GF and further goals from Nielsen and Uffe Pedersen gave Odense BK a 5–1 win and their second league title.

== Table ==
| Pos | Team | Pld | W | D | L | GF | GA | GD | Pts | Qualification or relegation |
|---|---|---|---|---|---|---|---|---|---|---|
| 1 | Odense BK | 30 | 18 | 5 | 7 | 51 | 28 | +23 | 41 | Qualification for the 1983–84 European Cup |
| 2 | Aarhus GF | 30 | 16 | 8 | 6 | 61 | 37 | +24 | 40 | Qualification for the 1983–84 UEFA Cup |
| 3 | Boldklubben 1903 | 30 | 14 | 7 | 9 | 41 | 29 | +12 | 35 | Qualification for the 1983–84 UEFA Cup |
| 4 | Brøndby IF | 30 | 14 | 6 | 10 | 57 | 36 | +21 | 34 | |
| 5 | Lyngby Boldklub | 30 | 12 | 10 | 8 | 45 | 36 | +9 | 34 | |
| 6 | Hvidovre IF | 30 | 12 | 9 | 9 | 35 | 30 | +5 | 33 | |
| 7 | Vejle BK | 30 | 14 | 5 | 11 | 44 | 41 | +3 | 33 | |
| 8 | Næstved IF | 30 | 12 | 8 | 10 | 36 | 36 | 0 | 32 | |
| 9 | Kolding IF | 30 | 8 | 14 | 8 | 34 | 38 | −4 | 30 | |
| 10 | Køge BK | 30 | 11 | 7 | 12 | 47 | 42 | +5 | 29 | |
| 11 | Esbjerg fB | 30 | 12 | 4 | 14 | 40 | 50 | −10 | 28 | |
| 12 | B 93 | 30 | 7 | 13 | 10 | 45 | 44 | +1 | 27 | |
| 13 | Ikast FS | 30 | 9 | 7 | 14 | 34 | 45 | −11 | 25 | |
| 14 | B 1901 | 30 | 7 | 9 | 14 | 28 | 54 | −26 | 23 | Relegation to 1983 Danish 2nd Division |
| 15 | KB | 30 | 6 | 6 | 18 | 44 | 66 | −22 | 18 | Relegation to 1983 Danish 2nd Division |
| 16 | B 1909 | 30 | 5 | 8 | 17 | 36 | 66 | −30 | 18 | Relegation to 1983 Danish 2nd Division |

Updated to match(es) played on unknown. Source:

== Results ==
| Home \ Away | AGF | B93 | B01 | B03 | B09 | BIF | EfB | HIF | IFS | KB | KIF | KBK | LBK | NIF | OB | VBK |
|---|---|---|---|---|---|---|---|---|---|---|---|---|---|---|---|---|
| Aarhus GF | — | 1–0 | 1–1 | 3–2 | 6–0 | 1–0 | 4–0 | 1–3 | 1–2 | 4–3 | 1–1 | 2–0 | 0–0 | 0–0 | 2–0 | 7–1 |
| B.93 | 2–2 | — | 0–1 | 2–2 | 0–0 | 1–1 | 3–2 | 0–1 | 4–1 | 3–0 | 0–0 | 2–0 | 2–2 | 0–0 | 0–2 | 1–2 |
| B 1901 | 1–5 | 1–1 | — | 0–4 | 1–0 | 2–2 | 3–1 | 1–1 | 0–0 | 1–0 | 2–2 | 2–1 | 1–2 | 0–3 | 1–2 | 0–3 |
| B 1903 | 2–1 | 1–0 | 1–1 | — | 3–1 | 0–1 | 1–0 | 1–1 | 2–1 | 4–0 | 1–1 | 1–3 | 1–2 | 2–0 | 0–1 | 1–0 |
| B 1909 | 0–1 | 4–4 | 4–0 | 0–0 | — | 0–4 | 0–1 | 1–4 | 1–1 | 0–2 | 3–0 | 4–2 | 1–3 | 1–0 | 0–2 | 2–3 |
| Brøndby IF | 5–2 | 1–1 | 1–2 | 2–0 | 7–1 | — | 0–1 | 3–1 | 1–2 | 1–2 | 3–1 | 3–2 | 3–2 | 3–1 | 3–2 | 1–0 |
| Esbjerg fB | 1–2 | 3–2 | 3–0 | 1–4 | 1–0 | 1–0 | — | 3–3 | 1–0 | 3–1 | 1–0 | 1–1 | 2–1 | 2–1 | 1–2 | 2–0 |
| Hvidovre IF | 0–0 | 0–0 | 1–1 | 0–1 | 0–2 | 2–1 | 2–0 | — | 1–0 | 2–0 | 1–2 | 0–1 | 0–2 | 0–2 | 0–0 | 1–0 |
| Ikast FS | 1–3 | 2–3 | 1–2 | 0–1 | 1–1 | 1–4 | 3–2 | 2–0 | — | 1–0 | 1–2 | 0–0 | 2–0 | 0–2 | 0–0 | 2–0 |
| Kjøbenhavns BK | 2–4 | 1–1 | 2–0 | 1–2 | 5–3 | 0–0 | 2–2 | 1–2 | 3–4 | — | 0–1 | 2–4 | 3–5 | 3–0 | 2–2 | 2–4 |
| Kolding IF | 3–3 | 1–2 | 0–0 | 0–0 | 0–0 | 1–0 | 2–0 | 2–2 | 0–0 | 2–2 | — | 0–1 | 1–1 | 0–0 | 1–3 | 1–1 |
| Køge BK | 0–1 | 2–2 | 3–1 | 0–0 | 4–1 | 1–1 | 4–2 | 0–4 | 3–1 | 2–0 | 3–0 | — | 0–1 | 5–0 | 0–2 | 2–4 |
| Lyngby BK | 0–0 | 1–2 | 1–0 | 0–3 | 3–1 | 2–2 | 4–0 | 0–0 | 3–1 | 1–1 | 2–4 | 1–1 | — | 3–0 | 1–1 | 1–1 |
| Næstved IF | 2–1 | 2–1 | 2–1 | 2–0 | 3–3 | 1–3 | 0–0 | 1–2 | 1–2 | 3–1 | 4–0 | 2–2 | 1–0 | — | 1–0 | 2–1 |
| Odense BK | 1–2 | 4–3 | 5–1 | 3–0 | 3–0 | 1–0 | 2–1 | 2–0 | 4–2 | 4–1 | 1–4 | 1–0 | 0–1 | 0–0 | — | 0–1 |
| Vejle BK | 4–0 | 4–3 | 2–1 | 2–1 | 2–2 | 2–1 | 3–2 | 0–1 | 0–0 | 1–2 | 0–2 | 1–0 | 2–0 | 0–0 | 0–1 | — |

Legend: Blue = home team win; Yellow = draw; Red = away team win.

== Top goalscorers ==
Top scorers
| Position | Player | Club | Goals |
|---|---|---|---|
| 1 | Ib Jacquet | Vejle BK | 20 |
| 2 | Vilhelm Munk Nielsen | Odense BK | 16 |
| 3 | Michael Laudrup | Brøndby IF | 15 |
| = | Lars Francker | B 93 | 15 |
| 5 | Brian Chrøis | Brøndby IF | 14 |
| = | Per Thomsen | Køge BK | 14 |
| = | Jens Kolding | B 93 | 14 |
| = | Lars Lundkvist | Aarhus GF | 14 |
| 9 | Henrik Skouboe | Næstved IF | 13 |
| 10 | Tommy Christensen | Aarhus GF | 12 |
| = | Erik Rasmussen | Køge BK | 12 |
