= 1926 FBUs Pokalturnering =

1926 FBU Cup

Tournament details
- Country: Denmark
- Venue(s): OB's Bane i Munke Mose, Odense
- Dates: 8 August – 5 September 1926
- Teams: 18

Final positions
- Champions: B 1913 (2nd title)
- Runners-up: Odense BK

Tournament statistics
- Matches played: 17
- Total matches and goals scored include replays and scheduled games

The 1926 FBUs Pokalturnering (Unofficial English translation: 1926 FBU Cup, 1926 Funen Cup) was the 7th edition of the regional tournament, FBUs Pokalturnering, the highest senior cup competition organised by the Funen FA (FBU). The tournament was held in the third quarter of 1926 with B 1913 as the defending cup champions. The season was launched on 8 August 1926 with the preliminary round involving two matches involving Ejby BK versus Dalum BK and Assens G&IK versus AIK Bogense, while Bogense G&IF and Arbejdernes I&BK (AIB) of Middelfart both received a bye to the next round. A total of eighteen teams from the 1925–26 FBUs A-række, the 1925–26 FBUs B-række and three new member clubs of the regional football association participated in the cup tournament, which embraced seventeen cup matches — the reigning Funen champions Svendborg BK from the top-flight league choose not to participate in this year's edition.

This season's installment was won by B 1913 after defeating Odense BK 3–1 in the final played at OB's field at Munke Mose in Odense on 5 September 1926, which was the club's second cup title in a row in the same number of finals. Odense-based B 1913 secured its berth in the final by defeating the Funen FA's newest member, Særslev BK, including league rivals B 1909 and BK Marienlyst, eventually making the tournament's final a repeat of the 1925 FBUs Pokalturnering final. They outscored their opponents 28–2 on aggregate in the four games played in this year's competition. The cup tournament took place before the start of the 1926–27 regional league season tournaments.

== Participants ==
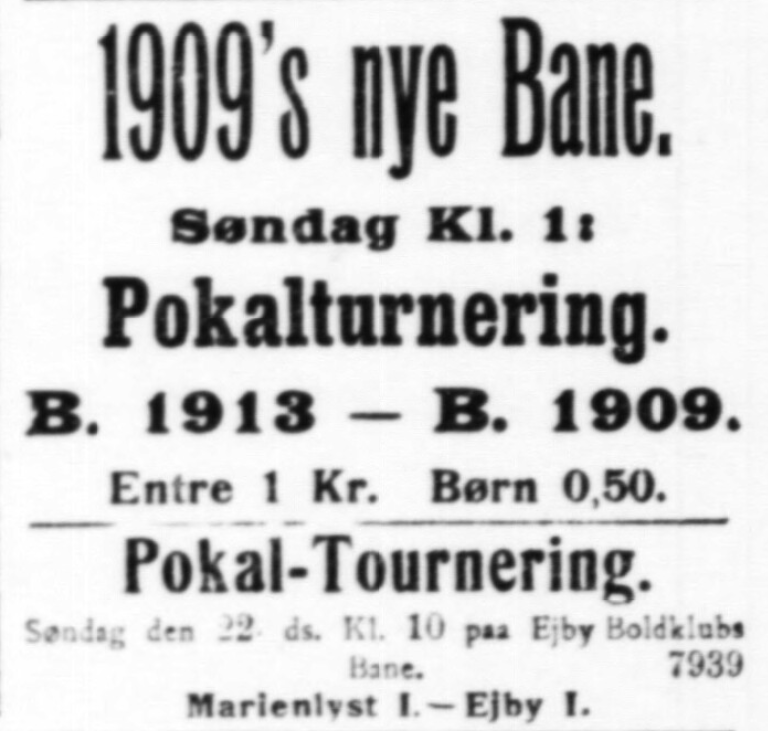
Newspaper advertisement for the quarter-final matches on 22 August 1926 between B 1909 vs. B 1913 and Ejby BK vs. BK Marienlyst.

The following 18 teams participated in the cup tournament.

Team	Last season's league position
B 1913	Runners-up of the 1925–26 FBUs A-række
B 1909	3rd place of the 1925–26 FBUs A-række
Nyborg G&IF	4th place of the 1925–26 FBUs A-række
Odense BK	5th place of the 1925–26 FBUs A-række
Dalum BK	6th place of the 1925–26 FBUs A-række
BK Marienlyst	Winners of the 1925–26 FBUs B-række, final round
Ejby BK	Runners-up of the 1925–26 FBUs B-række, final round
Middelfart G&IK	4th place of the 1925–26 FBUs B-række, final round
Nørre Aaby IK	Runners-up of the 1925–26 FBUs B-række, 1. kreds
Bogense G&IF	Runners-up of the 1925–26 FBUs B-række, 2. kreds
Assens G&IK	Runners-up of the 1925–26 FBUs B-række, 3. kreds
Thurø BK	Runners-up of the 1925–26 FBUs B-række, 4. kreds
Arbejdernes I&BK	3rd place of the 1925–26 FBUs B-række, 1. kreds
Otterup B&IK	3rd place of the 1925–26 FBUs B-række, 2. kreds
Faaborg IF	3rd place of the 1925–26 FBUs B-række, 4. kreds
Særslev BK	New member of the Funen FA
Afholdsfolkenes BK	New member of the Funen FA
AIK Bogense	New member of the Funen FA

== Matches ==
=== Bracket ===
Preliminary round
8 August 1926
Ejby BK	3
Dalum BK	0
8 August 1926
Assens G&IK	.
AIK Bogense	.

First round proper
15 August 1926
B 1909	w/o
Nørre Aaby IK
15 August 1926
Særslev BK	1
B 1913	17
15 August 1926
BK Marienlyst	10
Afholdsfolkenes BK	0
15 August 1926
Bogense G&IF	1
Ejby BK	4
15 August 1926
Assens G&IK	6
Arbejdernes I&BK	0
15 August 1926
Otterup B&IK	0
Odense BK	12
15 August 1926
Nyborg G&IF	1
Middelfart G&IK	2
15 August 1926
Thurø BK	1
Faaborg IF	4

Quarter-finals
22 August 1926
B 1909	0
B 1913	4
22 August 1926
Ejby BK	2
BK Marienlyst	7
22 August 1926
Assens G&IK	3
Odense BK	9
22 August 1926
Middelfart G&IK	6
Faaborg IF	0

Semi-finals
29 August 1926
BK Marienlyst	0
B 1913	4
29 August 1926
Odense BK	6
Middelfart G&IK	3

Cup Final
5 September 1926
Odense BK	1
B 1913	3

=== Preliminary round ===
Four FBUs B-række clubs entered the competition at this stage. The matches were scheduled for Sunday, 8 August 1926. Two teams gained a bye due to a lower amount of entries to the competition than originally expected.

8 August 1926	Ejby BK	3–0	Dalum BK	Ejby (next to Odense)
09:30 CET				Stadium: Ejby BK's Bane

8 August 1926	Assens G&IK	v	AIK Bogense	Assens
??:?? CET

Bogense G&IF	bye

Arbejdernes I&BK	bye

=== First round proper ===
The matches were scheduled for Sunday, 15 August 1926. Arbejdernes I&BK filed a protest to the Funen FA proclaiming that the match referee unjustifiably sent off an AIB player.

15 August 1926	B 1909	w/o (Note: The first match between B 1909 and Nørre Aaby IK scheduled to take place on 15 August 1926 was forfeited by Nørre Aaby IK before the match was played, hence B 1909 advanced to the next round.)	Nørre Aaby IK
??:?? CET

15 August 1926	Særslev BK	1–17	B 1913
??:?? CET

15 August 1926	BK Marienlyst	10–0	Afholdsfolkenes BK
??:?? CET

15 August 1926	Bogense G&IF	1–4	Ejby BK	Bogense
??:?? CET

15 August 1926	Assens G&IK	6–0	Arbejdernes I&BK	Assens
??:?? CET

15 August 1926	Otterup B&IK	0–12	Odense BK
??:?? CET

15 August 1926	Nyborg G&IF	1–2	Middelfart G&IK	Nyborg
??:?? CET	n/a 1h'		n/a 1h'; n/a 1h'	Stadium: Nyborg Idrætspark

15 August 1926	Thurø BK	1–4	Faaborg IF
??:?? CET

=== Quarter-finals ===
The four quarter-final ties were scheduled to be played on Sunday, 22 August 1926.

22 August 1926	B 1909	0–4	B 1913	Odense
13:00 CET	Edmund Christensen 22' (o.g.)		Henry "Lodvig" Ludvigsen 25', 7?'; Poul Espe 60' (pen.)	Stadium: B 1909's nye Bane; Attendance: 650; Referee: Otto Remke (Akademisk BK)

22 August 1926	Ejby BK	2–7	BK Marienlyst	Ejby (next to Odense)
10:00 CET				Stadium: Ejby BK's Bane

22 August 1926	Assens G&IK	3–9	Odense BK	Assens
??:?? CET	n/a 1h'; n/a 2h'; n/a 2h'		Kaj Olsen ?', ?', ?', ?', ?'; Malte Jensen ?', ?', ?'; K. Kaabhden ?'

22 August 1926	Middelfart G&IK	7–0	Faaborg IF	Middelfart
16:00 CET	n/a ?'; n/a 1h'; n/a 1h'; n/a 1h'; n/a 1h'; n/a 2h'; n/a 2h'			Stadium: Banen ved Assensvej; Attendance: A couple of hundred

=== Semi-finals ===
Both semi-final matches were played in Odense on Sunday, 29 August 1926 with no replays required. B 1913 and Odense BK came through the semi-final round to meet at OB's Bane i Munke Mose, Odense.

29 August 1926	BK Marienlyst	0–4	B 1913	Odense
10:00 CET			Kaj Seebach 1h'; Martin "Malle" Petersen 1h'; Henry "Lodvig" Ludvigsen 1h'; Albert Fischer 8?'	Stadium: BM's nye Bane

29 August 1926	Odense BK	6–3	Middelfart G&IK	Odense
14:45 CET	n/a 1h'; n/a 1h'; n/a 2h'; n/a 2h'; n/a 2h'; n/a 2h'		n/a 10'; n/a 43'; n/a 2h'	Stadium: OB's Bane i Munke Mose

=== Cup Final ===
==== Match summary ====
The 1926 FBUs Pokalturnering final was contested by B 1913 and Odense BK at OB's Bane i Munke Mose, Odense on Sunday, 5 September 1926, which was a repeat of the 1925 FBUs Pokalturnering final. The game was refereed by Sophus Hansen (affiliated with BK Frem). Based on the team's merits in the cup tournament and their recent league standings, the defending cup champions and league runners-up B 1913 were regarded as favorites to win the cup title against Odense BK by various newspapers. The Odense BK squad was mostly composed of new players, including a new goalkeeper, and this final was regarded as their first most important match so far. William von Würden had trained the Odense BK squad the past summer. The draw concerning the right to choose the starting half of the football field was won by B 1913, who choose to have the strong wind in their backs.

Despite battling with a headwind, Odense BK had a predominance of goal scoring chances and game play in the first half. The first goal was netted in the 20th minute by Odense BK right innerwing Børge Jensen after a pass from the left side outside the reach of B 1913's goalkeeper Olaf "Laffe" Petersen, while the equalizing goal by B 1913's Henry "Lodvig" Ludvigsen was scored fifteen minutes later following a pass from Martin "Malle" Petersen, and the first half ending in an 1–1 tie. The game play was more even during the second half. In the 75th minute, B 1913's forward Albert Fischer passed the ball to Ludvigsen, who scored his second goal, which the newspaper Fyens Stiftstidende and Fyns Social-Demokrat reported should have been ruled as offside. It started to rain right after the goal was scored. The lead energized the B 1913 players and following some fumble play in front of the goal, Ludvigsen was credited with scoring B 1913's third goal four minutes before full time, completing a hat-trick.

The match ended with the score 3–1 to B 1913 in front of an attendance of 550 spectators, securing the Odense-based club their second consecutive cup title in two final entries.

==== Match details ====
5 September 1926
13:30 CET

Odense BK	1–3	B 1913
Børge Jensen 20'		Henry "Lodvig" Ludvigsen 35', 75', 86'

OB's Bane i Munke Mose, Odense
Attendance: 550
Referee: Sophus Hansen (BK Frem)

Odense BK	B 1913

GK
DF
DF
MF
MF	(Denmark) Alb. Bøggild
MF
FW	(Denmark) Børge Jensen
FW
FW
FW
FW

GK	(Denmark) Olaf "Laffe" Petersen
DF	(Denmark) ? Hyldahl
DF
MF	(Denmark) Christian "Krølle" Larsen
MF	(Denmark) Børge ?
MF
FW	(Denmark) Kaj Seebach
FW	(Denmark) Carl Hansen
FW	(Denmark) Henry "Lodvig" Ludvigsen
FW	(Denmark) Martin "Malle" Petersen
FW	(Denmark) Albert Fischer

Match rules

- 90 minutes.
- 30 minutes of extra time if necessary.
- Replay match if scores still level.
- No substitutes.

== Statistics ==
=== Hat-tricks ===
Player	For	Against	Result	Date	Ref
(Denmark) Kaj Olsen^{5}	Odense BK	Assens G&IK	9–3 (A)	22 August 1926	
(Denmark) Malte Jensen	Odense BK	Assens G&IK	9–3 (A)	22 August 1926	
(Denmark) Henry "Lodvig" Ludvigsen	B 1913	Odense BK	3–1 (N)	5 September 1926	

- ^{5} Player scored 5 goals
