= Randers FC =

Danish football club

Randers
- Full name: Randers FC
- Nickname: Hestene (The Horses)
- Short name: RFC
- Founded: 1 January 2003; 23 years ago
- Ground: Cepheus Park Randers
- Capacity: 10,300
- Chairman: Per Hastrup
- Manager: Rasmus Bertelsen
- League: Superliga
- 2025–26: Superliga, 10th of 12
- Website: www.randersfc.dk
Home colours	Away colours	Third colours

Randers FC (Danish pronunciation: [ˈʁɑnɐs]) is a professional football club based in Randers, East Jutland, that plays in the Danish Superliga, the top flight of the Danish football league system. Founded on 1 January 2003, the club builds upon the license of Randers Freja, a former three-time Danish Cup winning team. As of 2022 the club has won the Danish Cup twice in its history. Randers plays its matches at the 10,300-capacity Cepheus Park Randers.

== History ==
The club was formed on 1 January 2003, as a collaboration between six local Randers-clubs; Dronningborg Boldklub (founded 1928), Hornbæk Sportsforening (founded 1945), Kristrup Boldklub (founded 1908), Randers Freja (founded 1898), Randers KFUM (founded 1920) and Vorup Frederiksberg Boldklub (founded 1930), continuing Randers Freja's (at the time) 1st division-team.

=== First years and Cup success ===
In the first season as a newly created club, Randers ended in fourth place in the Viasat Sport Division with 51 points. The captain of the Denmark national team which won UEFA Euro 1992, Lars Olsen, was coach of the team. The following year, the team ended in second place with 66 points and was promoted to the country's best league, the SAS Liga.

With only 24 points in 2004–05 season in the SAS Liga, Randers finished in last place. In the 2005–06 season, however, Randers redeemed itself, securing promotion back to the SAS League with 61 points while also winning the Danish Cup with a 1–0 victory over Esbjerg in the final at Parken Stadium on 11 May 2006. Randers was the first team since 1974 who managed to win the Danish Cup although playing in the second-highest league in Denmark.

In mid-2005, the club brought in former Denmark national team midfielder Stig Tøfting on a free transfer, after AGF, his childhood-club, refused to let him play (even for free) due to his violent background with several sentences. Tøfting was appointed Assistant Coach in November 2006.

In the 2006–07 season, Randers finished in eighth place with 38 points, as well as participation in the UEFA Cup the season before, where the club met ÍA of Iceland, FBK Kaunas of Lithuania and major club Fenerbahçe from Turkey.

Before the start of the 2007–08 season, Randers signed former England national team player Colin Todd as its new manager. Randers started the season in great fashion, winning its first four matches (most notably a 5–0 win against Aalborg BK).

In the second half of the 2007–08 season, Randers continued to improve in the Danish league. With new signings Marc Nygaard and Søren Berg, expectations grew as the season progressed, and Randers ultimately finished in sixth place following a 2–1 win against Brøndby IF in the final matchday of the season.

The 2008–09 season started in promising fashion for the club, recording a 3–1 win against the local rivals AGF. Randers continued its solid start with a 1–1 a draw with Copenhagen. In the third round, Randers was to play Brøndby away; the club had never defeated Brøndby away before. Randers won 0–3 following goals from Carsten Fredgaard, Bédi Buval and Tidiane Sane. After the five first rounds, Randers was still undefeated, though at the winter break Randers was placed mid-table.

=== Up and down years ===
On 4 November 2008 Randers announced that former Danish international John "Faxe" Jensen would become its new manager from 1 July following the ending of Colin Todd's contract. Todd, however, expressed his frustration about how Randers had dealt with the situation and openly criticised the club for putting him in a difficult situation.

Jensen ended up taking the place as manager six months before schedule due to the club having reached an agreement with the then present manager Todd. Jensen was officially announced new manager on 5 January. He started his time in Randers in great fashion, winning the first league game of the season against local rivals AGF 2–1. However, the club failed to sustain the winning form when they went to draw against Vejle BK and thereafter lost the following three games to the top three sides OB, Copenhagen and BIF. The team's losing streak culminated in a 1–6 to Nordsjælland.

The club, however, responded well to the losing streak and won the next five games, ironically setting a new club winning streak. The season ended with a 3–3 draw away against Danish champions Copenhagen and a fifth-place finish, it highest league rank in club history. Marc Nygaard claimed the golden boot for 16 goals during the season. Morten Nordstrand was later credited for a goal on penalty in the final match, and also had a goal tally of 16, but Nygaard was awarded the title as he was the first to reach the 16 goals.

Randers and Faxe decided that Tøfting was not the right choice as assistant manager, and, on 1 May 2009, the club announced that Tøfting's contract would not be extended. On 2 June, the club announced that two of Jensen's colleagues from the Euro 1992-winning Danish side – Henrik Larsen and Flemming Povlsen – as its new assistant managers; Larsen was named first assistant manager while Povlsen as assistant focused on the club's attack. However, after a catastrophic start to the 2009–10 season with only 2 points earned from 11 league games, Jensen and his assistants were released from their contracts.

Ove Christensen was appointed new head coach for Randers for the remainder of the 2009–10 season. He was given the objective to save Randers from relegation, although Randers was projected to be relegated at the winter break by the media and experts. However, a historic comeback with 16 games without defeat meant that its topflight status was to be decided on the final day of the season. A loss to Brøndby would mean that if AGF won its game against OB, the best team of the spring season would be relegated. OB won 0–3 and Randers lost its first match in the second half of the season 1–3, ensuring Randers kept their top-flight status. Yura Movsisyan was arguably the key in Randers' survival, as he scored 7 goals in 13 games.

When Ove Christensen arrived, he gave the squad an overhaul and nine players were released or sold in the winter break of 2009–10 season. He also made several signings: Anders Egholm from SønderjyskE, Morten Karlsen from Nordsjælland and Søren Jensen on loan from Odd Grenland. Christensen signed a new one-year contract as head coach on 17 May 2010.

In the following season, however, Christensen could not follow up on the success and was fired after a loss to Brøndby. Peter Elstrup and Allan Kuhn were Brough in as caretakers but could not prevent Randers' relegation at the end of the season. Michael Hemmingsen was named new head coach with the first task to bring Randers back to the Superliga. With Hemmingsen as head coach, Randers ended the 2011–12 season in second place in the Danish 1st division, thereby earning promotion back to the Superliga.

=== League success and Europa League qualification ===
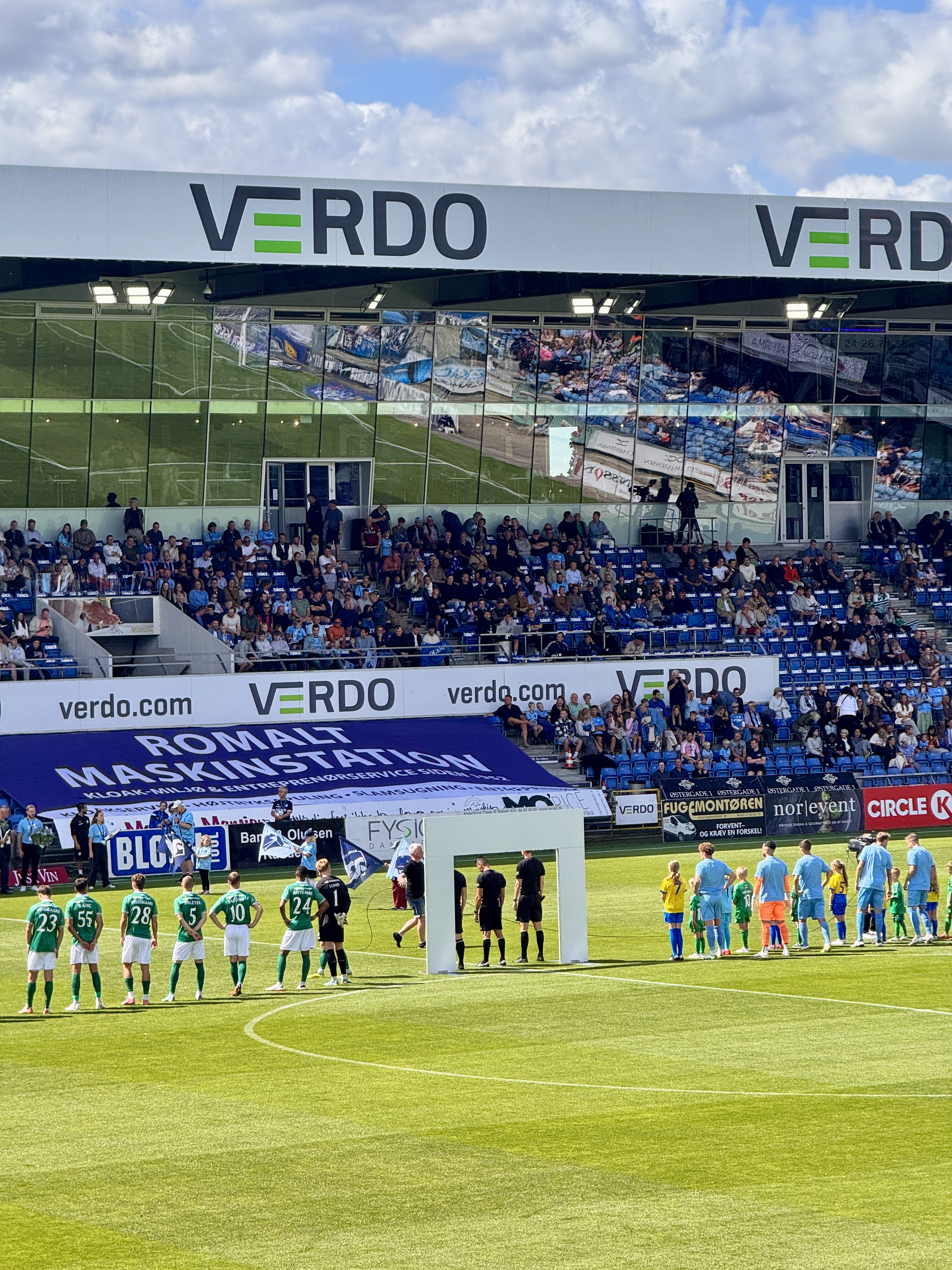
Randers (right) lining up against Viborg at Cepheus Park Randers

Despite having earned promotion to the Danish Superliga, Hemmingsen was replaced as head coach by former Randers coach Colin Todd, who returned to the club following his coaching spell from 2007 to 2009. Randers did well in its first season after being promoted, ending its 2012–13 league campaign in third place, the club's best ever league finish. The team also reached the final in the Danish Cup, but lost 1–0 to Esbjerg. Nonetheless, the league result meant that Randers was to participate in the UEFA Europa League. It entered the tournament in the third round of qualifying, where it met Rubin Kazan. Randers, however, lost the home match 2–0 and the away match 2–0, thus failing to qualify for the group stage.

During the 2020–21 season, Randers achieved a significant milestone in their history by securing a place in the championship playoffs of the Danish Superliga via a fifth-place finish in the regular season. Moreover, the club claimed victory in the Danish Cup after defeating SønderjyskE 4–0 in the final at Ceres Park in Aarhus, with goals from Erik Marxen, Simon Piesinger, and a brace by Mathias Greve. This triumph earned them the opportunity to participate in European competition in the 2021–22 season. Although they narrowly missed out on a place in the UEFA Europa League after losing to Galatasaray in the playoffs, they qualified for the inaugural UEFA Europa Conference League group stage. They finished second in their group after competing against AZ Alkmaar from the Netherlands, CFR Cluj from Romania, and Jablonec from the Czech Republic. This result secured their progression to the knockout stage, where they faced English powerhouse Leicester City, which included Denmark national team captain Kasper Schmeichel. Despite their best efforts, they were eliminated from the competition, thus concluding their European journey.

In August 2026 the Japanese company Suzuyo & Co., Ltd., who also owns the Japanese league club Shimizu S-Pulse, bought 80% of the club.

== Rivals ==
Randers' biggest rivals are East Jutland neighbours Aarhus Gymnastikforening.

== European record ==
During the 2006–07 season, Randers managed to qualify for the UEFA Cup as Danish Cup winners. During the 2009–10 season, the club was invited to participate in the Europa League due to its second place in the Danish league Fair Play ranking – behind 2008–09 champions Copenhagen, which claimed Denmark's UEFA Champions League spot. During the 2010–11 season, the club participated in the Europa League due to its second-place finish in the Danish league Fair Play ranking – behind 2009–10 champions Copenhagen, which again claimed the Champions League spot.

Season	Competition	Round	Club	Home	Away	Aggregate
2006–07	UEFA Cup	First qualifying round	(Iceland) ÍA	1–0	1–2	2–2 (a)
2006–07	UEFA Cup	Second qualifying round	(Lithuania) FBK Kaunas	3–1	0–1	3–2
2006–07	UEFA Cup	First round	(Turkey) Fenerbahçe	0–3	1–2	1–5
2009–10	UEFA Europa League	First qualifying round	(Northern Ireland) Linfield	4–0	3–0	7–0
2009–10	UEFA Europa League	Second qualifying round	(Lithuania) Sūduva	1–1	1–0	2–1
2009–10	UEFA Europa League	Third qualifying round	(Germany) Hamburger SV	0–4	1–0	1–4
2010–11	UEFA Europa League	First qualifying round	(Luxembourg) F91 Dudelange	6–1	1–2	7–3
2010–11	UEFA Europa League	Second qualifying round	(Slovenia) Gorica	1–1	3–0	4–1
2010–11	UEFA Europa League	Third qualifying round	(Switzerland) Lausanne-Sport	2–3	1–1	3–4
2013–14	UEFA Europa League	Third qualifying round	(Russia) Rubin Kazan	1–2	0–2	1–4
2015–16	UEFA Europa League	First qualifying round	(Andorra) Sant Julià	3–0	1–0	4–0
2015–16	UEFA Europa League	Second qualifying round	(Sweden) Elfsborg	0–0	0–1	0–1
2021–22	UEFA Europa League	Play-off round	(Turkey) Galatasaray	1–1	1–2	2–3
2021–22	UEFA Europa Conference League	Group D	(Netherlands) AZ	2–2	0–1	2nd place
2021–22	UEFA Europa Conference League	Group D	(Romania) CFR Cluj	2–1	1–1	2nd place
2021–22	UEFA Europa Conference League	Group D	(Czech Republic) Jablonec	2–2	2–2	2nd place
2021–22	UEFA Europa Conference League	Knockout round play-offs	(England) Leicester City	1–3	1–4	2–7

== Stadium ==
=== Randers Stadium ===
Randers Stadium was founded in 1961. It was built to hold 18,000 spectators and in 1969 a record of 16,500 people attended the UEFA Cup loss against 1. FC Köln.

==== 2012 rebuild ====
The stadium was rebuilt in 2012 and renamed AutoC Park with a capacity of 10,300 spectators. It was built by C. F. Møller Architects and is established on the former Randers Stadium site. On 22 September 2015, it was announced that local company BioNutria had bought the name rights of the stadium until 31 October 2018. On 14 November 2018, it was announced that Cepheus group had bought the name rights of the stadium for 3 years.

The new stadium attendance record after the stadium was rebuilt, is 9,947, set against Aarhus GF on 6 October 2019

== Supporters ==
The largest supporter group is Nordtribunen (i.e. The North Tribune), however there are more factions within the fandom of Randers.

== Honours ==
- Danish Superliga
  - Third place (1): 2012–13
- Danish Cup
  - Winners (2): 2005–06, 2020–21
  - Runners-up (1): 2012–13
- UEFA Fair Play League
  - Winners: 2009, 2010

== Records ==
Most games played: 223 (Denmark) Mads Fenger

Most goals: 41 (Denmark) Ronnie Schwartz

Biggest league win: 5–0 Randers – AAB (in 2007)

Biggest league loss: 1–6 Randers – Nordsjælland (in 2009), SønderjyskE – Randers FC (in 2012)

Highest attendance(home): 11,824 Randers – Brøndby

Longest run without defeat: 16 (29 November 2009 – 5 May 2010)

Longest winning streak: 5 (13 April 2010 – 3 May 2010)

Longest run without a win: 18 (31 May 2009 – 29 November 2009)

== Players ==
=== Squad ===
As of 7 September 2026

Note: Flags indicate national team as defined under FIFA eligibility rules; some limited exceptions apply. Players may hold more than one non-FIFA nationality.

No.	Pos.	Nation	Player
1	GK	AUS	Paul Izzo
2	DF	BEL	Lucas Lissens
3	DF	DEN	Daniel Høegh
4	DF	NED	Wessel Dammers (captain)
5	DF	AUS	Oliver Jones
6	MF	SWE	John Björkengren
7	MF	DEN	Mike Themsen
8	MF	DEN	Laurits Pedersen
10	FW	MAD	Warren Caddy
11	MF	FRA	Elies Mahmoud
14	MF	DEN	Frederik Lauenborg
15	DF	NOR	Martin Sjølstad
17	MF	DEN	Mathias Greve
21	MF	SWE	Axel Henriksson (on loan from Blackburn)

No.	Pos.	Nation	Player
22	GK	NED	Mert Demirci
23	DF	SWE	Benjamin Örn
24	DF	DEN	Sabil Hansen
25	MF	SEN	Ousseynou Fall Seck
26	MF	DEN	Hector Lux
27	DF	NOR	Nikolai Hopland
29	DF	DEN	Simon Stüker
30	FW	NED	Mohamed Sankoh
31	DF	DEN	Felix Sommer
32	GK	DEN	Jannich Storch
33	FW	GHA	Cyril Edudzi
36	FW	MLI	Amady Camara
44	DF	DEN	Nikolas Dyhr
77	FW	DEN	Kasper Junker

=== Youth players in use 2025-26 ===
Note: Flags indicate national team as defined under FIFA eligibility rules; some limited exceptions apply. Players may hold more than one non-FIFA nationality.

No. / Pos. / Nation / Player; 50 / MF / DEN / Lasse Mandal	No. / Pos. / Nation / Player; 51 / GK / DEN / Oliver Henriksen

=== Out on loan ===
Note: Flags indicate national team as defined under FIFA eligibility rules; some limited exceptions apply. Players may hold more than one non-FIFA nationality.

No.	Pos.	Nation	Player
9	FW	IRQ	Amin Al-Hamawi (at Helsingborgs IF until 31 December 2026)
18	FW	SYR	Noah Shamoun (at Kalmar FF until 31 December 2026)

No.	Pos.	Nation	Player
21	MF	GHA	Ernest Agyiri (at Mosta until 30 June 2027)
38	MF	DEN	Max Albæk (at VSK Aarhus 31 December 2026)

== Managers ==
- (Denmark) Lars Olsen (1 Jan 2003 – 24 January 2007)
- (England) Colin Todd (1 July 2007 – 5 January 2009)
- (Denmark) John "Faxe" Jensen (5 Jan 2009 – 6 October 2009)
- (Denmark) Ove Christensen (7 Oct 2009 – 26 April 2011)
- (Denmark) Peter Elstrup (interim) (27 Apr 2011 – 30 June 2011)
- (Denmark) Michael Hemmingsen (1 July 2011 – 5 July 2012)
- (England) Colin Todd (5 July 2012 – 30 June 2016)
- (Iceland) Ólafur Kristjánsson (1 July 2016 – 5 October 2017)
- (Netherlands) Ricardo Moniz (8 Oct 2017 – 26 January 2018)
- (Denmark) Rasmus Bertelsen (26 Jan 2018 – 30 June 2018)
- (Denmark) Thomas Thomasberg (1 July 2018 – 23 March 2023)
- (Denmark) Rasmus Bertelsen (23 March 2023 – )

== Staff ==
Management

Position	Name
Chief Executive Officer	Henrik Jørgensen
Head of Sales	Morten Hørby Andersen
Club Secretary	Jesper Hansen
Head of Communications	Kristian Fredslund Andersen
Press Officer	Martin Albrechtsen
Sales Assistant	Sylvester Hansen
Sales Assistant	Anders Hedeager
IT & Ticket Coordinator	Michael Møller Højfeldt
VIP & Hospitality	Lone Nikolajsen

Team

Position	Name
Director of Football	Søren Pedersen
Head coach	Rasmus Bertelsen
Assistant coach	Ralf Pedersen
Youth-Development Coach	Peter Elstrup
Goalkeeper coach	Erik Boye
Performance manager	Tobias Elstrup
Chief team assistant	Peer Kam
Team assistant	Ferhat Alici
Team assistant	Emil Stanic
Team assistant	Lars Pedersen
Team assistant	Hans Kirkegaard
Medical	Dr. Martin Nielsen

== Shirt sponsors ==
2003 – 2005–06: Nike

2006–07 – 2009–10: Umbro

2010–11 – 2012–13: H2O

2013–14 – 2014–15: Warrior

2015–16 – Puma

== League statistics ==
Season	Div.	Pos.	Pld	W	D	L	GF	GA	Pts	Cup	Notes
2002–03	1D	4	30	15	6	9	65	49	51	Fourth round	
2003–04	1D	2	30	21	3	6	85	43	66	Fourth round	Promoted
2004–05	SL	12	33	5	9	19	30	64	24	Fourth round	Relegated
2005–06	1D	2	30	19	4	7	64	30	61	Winner	Promoted
2006–07	SL	8	33	10	8	15	41	53	38	Quarter-final	UEFA Cup – First round
2007–08	SL	6	33	13	8	12	41	33	47	Quarter-final	
2008–09	SL	5	33	11	13	9	52	50	46	Fourth round	
2009–10	SL	10	33	10	10	13	37	43	40	Fourth round	Europa League – Third qualifying round
2010–11	SL	11	33	6	16	11	41	48	34	Semi-finals	Relegated; Europa League – Third qualifying round
2011–12	1D	2	26	15	4	7	38	22	49	3rd round	Promoted
2012–13	SL	3	33	15	7	11	36	42	52	Runners-up	
2013–14	SL	7	33	9	14	10	41	45	41	3rd round	Europa League – Third qualifying round
2014–15	SL	4	33	14	10	9	39	28	52	Quarter-final	
2015–16	SL	6	33	13	8	12	45	43	47	Quarter-final	Europa League – Second qualifying round
2016–17	SL	7	32	11	8	13	33	35	41	Quarter-final	Lost in European play-off final
2017–18	SL	12	32	7	9	16	32	52	30	Quarter-final	Won relegation play-off second round
2018–19	SL	7	32	12	9	11	35	39	45	Third round	Lost in European play-off final
2019–20	SL	7	26	10	5	11	39	35	35	Quarter-final	Lost in European play-off quarter-final
2020–21	SL	5	22	9	5	8	31	21	32	Winner	
2021–22	SL	5	22	9	6	7	26	25	33	Quarter-final	Europa Conference League – Knockout round play-offs
