= Jens Kolding =

Danish footballer (born 1952)

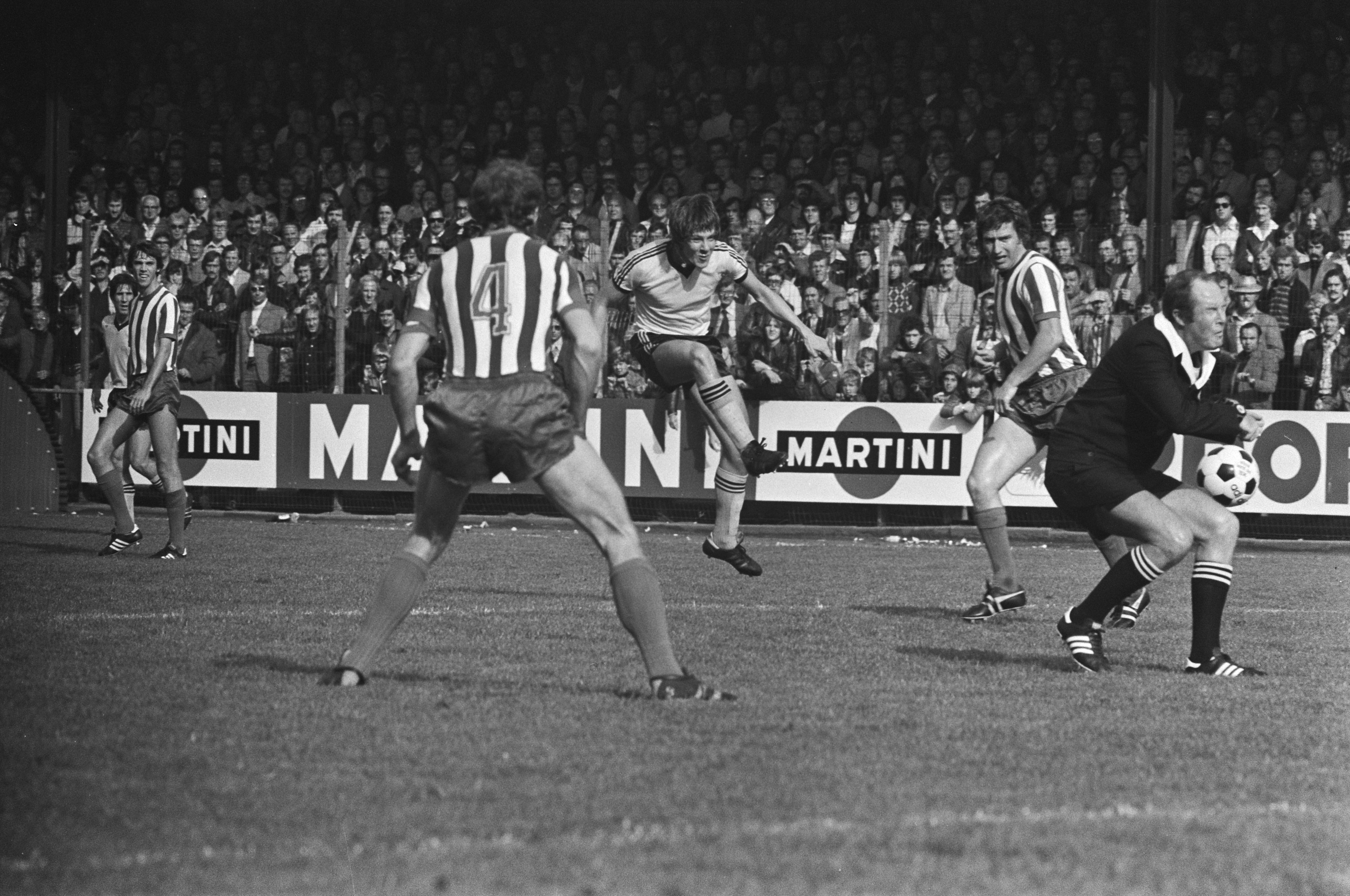
- Kolding hits referee Vervoort with a ball

Personal information
- Date of birth: 12 July 1952 (age 74)
- Place of birth: Frederiksberg, Denmark
- Position: Striker

Youth career
- 1961–1970: B.93

Senior career*
Years	Team	Apps	(Gls)
1970–1976	B.93		
1976–1980	Roda JC	90	(14)
1980–1983	B.93		
1984–1985	Brøndby	48	(13)
1986–1988	B.93		

International career
1974	Denmark U21	6	(3)
1973–1981	Denmark	6	(0)
- * Club domestic league appearances and goals

Jens Kolding (born 12 July 1952) is a Danish former professional footballer who played as a striker. He spent the majority of his career with B.93, where he ranks among the club's all-time leaders in appearances and goals, and also represented Brøndby in Denmark and Roda JC in the Netherlands. With B.93, he won the Danish Cup in 1982, and with Brøndby he won the Danish league title in 1985, finishing as the club's top scorer the same season. At international level, Kolding earned six caps for the Denmark national football team between 1973 and 1981.

== Career ==
Kolding joined B.93 as a youth player in 1961 and progressed to the senior team in 1970, marking his debut on 11 October with a hat-trick in a 7–1 victory over FB. He was part of the side that rose from the Danish 3rd Division to the top flight within a few seasons.

In 1976, Kolding signed professional terms with Roda JC in the Netherlands. He earned the epithet "Denmark's first football millionaire," though his spell abroad was curtailed by a complex cruciate ligament operation. During his tenure, he received high praise from peers—including Frank Arnesen and Søren Lerby—who regarded him as the greatest Danish talent they had seen. Notably, he also starred in a memorable match against Ajax, scoring twice in a 4–1 victory.

Kolding returned to B.93 in 1980 and helped secure the Danish Cup in 1982. In 1984, he moved to Brøndby as successor to Michael Laudrup. He finished the 1984 season as the club's top scorer and was instrumental in Brøndby claiming their first Danish league title in 1985, making 64 appearances in total.

In 1986, Kolding returned once more to B.93, playing a critical role in ensuring the team's survival in the 2nd Division, culminating in a decisive final-day victory away at B1909. Across his career with B.93 from 1970 to 1988, he amassed 322 appearances and 141 goals, ranking second in appearances (behind Ole Petersen) and third in goals for the club.

== After football ==
Beyond the pitch, he has continued to serve B.93 in various capacities, including as member of the football board (1991–96; 2018–20), working in stadium operations, serving as senior attack coach, providing financial oversight, and acting as Old Boys team manager.

== Honours ==
B.93

- 3rd Division East: 1972
- Danish Cup: 1981–82

Brøndby

- 1st Division: 1985
