= Rasmus Bertelsen =

Danish association football manager (born 1983)

Personal information
- Full name: Rasmus Hammerby Bertelsen
- Date of birth: 1 December 1983 (age 42)
- Place of birth: Lystrup, Denmark

Team information
- Current team: Randers (head coach)

Managerial career
- Years: Team
- 2018: Randers (caretaker)
- 2023–: Randers

Rasmus Hammerby Bertelsen (born 1 December 1983) is a Danish football manager currently serving as head coach of Danish Superliga club Randers.

== Career ==
In July 2009, Bertelsen joined the staff of Randers as the head of academy coaching. He has held various roles within the club, including a stint as caretaker manager in January 2018 following Ricardo Moniz's dismissal. Following six months as caretaker, he returned to his previous role as assistant following the appointment of Thomas Thomasberg.

=== Head coach ===
When Thomasberg departed for fellow Danish Superliga club Midtjylland on 23 March 2023, Bertelsen became the full-time head coach at Randers. Originally given a contract until the summer of 2026, Randers extended Bertelsen's contract until 2028. He led Randers to their best finish in ten years when, at the conclusion of the 2024–25 season, the club finished in fourth place. In the following season, Randers fell to the lower half of the table, avoiding relegation by one point as the team finished in 10th place. With the team's struggles in his second full season in charge, Randers sporting director Søren Pedersen confirmed the club would be sticking with Bertelsen.

== Career statistics ==
As of match played 22 November 2026

Managerial record by team and tenure
Team	From	To	Record					Ref.
Team	From	To	G	W	D	L	Win %	Ref.
Randers (caretaker)	26 January 2018	30 June 2018	17	7	5	5	41.2	
Randers	23 March 2023	present	132	42	35	55	31.8	
Career total			149	49	40	60	32.9	
