= Henrik Clausen =

Danish football manager

Personal information
- Full name: Henrik Clausen
- Date of birth: 3 May 1971 (age 55)
- Place of birth: Denmark

Managerial career
- Years: Team
- 1994–1997: OB (youth)
- 1998–2000: OB (reserves)
- 1998–2001: OB (assistant)
- 2001–2003: Vejle (assistant)
- 2004–2006: OB (youth)
- 2006–2008: OB (reserves)
- 2008–2009: OB (youth)
- 2010: OB (fitness coach)
- 2010–2012: OB
- 2013–2015: Denmark U18
- 2015–2016: Denmark U21 (assistant)
- 2016–2020: Denmark U19
- 2020–: Haugesund (head of academy)

Henrik Clausen (born 3 May 1971) is a Danish football manager. He currently works as the head of academy of Norwegian club FK Haugesund. Most notably, Clausen has been the manager of Odense Boldklub (OB).

His career as a player ended in 1990 when Clausen was 19 years old due to an injury.

In 1994, he took up coaching and has worked with Odense BK for the most of his career. On 7 November 2010 he was named new head coach of Odense BK's Superliga team. OB did well after he took charge, finishing in second place behind F.C. Copenhagen in the 2010-11 season leading to qualification for the UEFA Champions League. However the results in the following season was mixed, and Clausen was sacked by OB on 26 March 2012 following an embarrassing 2-4 home defeat against HB Køge.

On 12 June 2013 he was named new manager of the Danish national under-18 football team. In November 2015 he became assistant manager of the Danish national under-21 football team.

He has a university degree in chemistry and sports.
