= Uffe Pedersen =

Danish footballer

Personal information
- Full name: Uffe Krag Pedersen
- Date of birth: 21 March 1954 (age 72)
- Place of birth: Otterup, Denmark
- Position: Forward

Team information
- Current team: OB (talent-chef)

Youth career
- Otterup

Senior career*
Years	Team	Apps	(Gls)
1972–1974	Otterup		
1974–1976	OB		
1976	Vancouver Whitecaps		
1976–1984	OB		

International career
1982–1983	Denmark U17	7	(0)

Managerial career
- 1984–1985: B 1913 (assistant)
- 1986–1988: OKS
- 1989–1994: OB (assistant)
- 1994–1995: OKS
- 1995–1999: Dalum
- 1999–2001: Horsens
- 2001–2002: OB (assistant)
- 2002–2004: OB
- 2007–2010: Denmark U21 (assistant)
- 2010: OB (caretaker)
- 2011: Denmark U21 (assistant)
- 2011–: OB (talent-chef)
- * Club domestic league appearances and goals

Uffe Krag Pedersen (born 21 March 1954) is a Danish football manager and former player who played as a forward. He works as talent chef for Odense Boldklub and previously managed AC Horsens and Odense Boldklub.
