= Battle of Jutland (football) =

Football rivalry between two clubs in Denmark

- Location: Jutland
- Teams: Aalborg BK; Aarhus GF
- First meeting: Aalborg 4–1 Aarhus (14 April 1991); 1991 Danish Superliga
- Latest meeting: Aalborg 1–0 Aarhus (9 July 2020); 2019–20 Danish Superliga
- Next meeting: 4 October 2020; 2020–21 Danish Superliga
- Stadiums: Aalborg Stadium (Aalborg); Aarhus Stadium (Aarhus)

Statistics
- Total meetings: 90
- Most wins: Aalborg (40)

Battle of Jutland (/ˈdʒʌtlənd/, JUT-lənd; Danish: Søslaget ved Jylland, pronounced [ˈsœˌslɛːˀðə veð ˈjyˌlænˀ]) is the football rivalry between two of the oldest clubs in Danish football history, Aalborg BK (founded 1885) and Aarhus GF (founded 1880).

== History behind rivalry ==
The rivalry between Aalborg BK and Aarhus GF is first and foremost a rivalry between Aarhus and Aalborg, which are respectively the second and the fourth largest cities in Denmark, and two of the most important business centers in Jutland. The rivalry between Aalborg BK and Aarhus GF is also a rivalry between two of the oldest football clubs in Denmark. Both clubs can trace their history all the way back to the 1880s. Aalborg BK and Aarhus GF are also, historically, two of the most successful football clubs in Denmark. Together, they have won 10 Danish Superliga titles (Aalborg BK with four and Aarhus GF with six) and 12 Danish Cup titles (Aalborg BK with three and Aarhus GF with nine).

== Danish Superliga games ==
The different matches which Aalborg BK and Aarhus GF have played against each other in Danish Superliga:

Date	Venue	Home	Score	Away
14 April 1991	Aalborg Stadion	Aalborg BK	4–1	Aarhus GF
9 June 1991	Aarhus Stadion	Aarhus GF	6–1	Aalborg BK
25 August 1991	Aalborg Stadion	Aalborg BK	0–2	Aarhus GF
2 November 1991	Aarhus Stadion	Aarhus GF	0–0	Aalborg BK
26 April 1992	Aarhus Stadion	Aarhus GF	1–0	Aalborg BK
8 June 1992	Aalborg Stadion	Aalborg BK	2–1	Aarhus GF
19 August 1992	Aalborg Stadion	Aalborg BK	3–2	Aarhus GF
25 October 1992	Aarhus Stadion	Aarhus GF	1–1	Aalborg BK
2 May 1993	Aalborg Stadion	Aalborg BK	2–1	Aarhus GF
6 June 1993	Aarhus Stadion	Aarhus GF	2–1	Aalborg BK
15 August 1993	Aarhus Stadion	Aarhus GF	2–1	Aalborg BK
10 October 1993	Aalborg Stadion	Aalborg BK	4–1	Aarhus GF
21 April 1994	Aarhus Stadion	Aalborg BK	1–1	Aarhus GF
23 May 1994	Aalborg Stadion	Aalborg BK	0–0	Aarhus GF
21 August 1994	Aalborg Stadion	Aalborg BK	5–0	Aarhus GF
8 October 1994	Aarhus Stadion	Aarhus GF	0–3	Aalborg BK
17 April 1995	Aarhus Stadion	Aarhus GF	2–1	Aalborg BK
18 June 1995	Aalborg Stadion	Aalborg BK	4–0	Aarhus GF
20 September 1995	Aarhus Stadion	Aarhus GF	1–0	Aalborg BK
5 November 1995	Aalborg Stadion	Aalborg BK	2–4	Aarhus GF
28 April 1996	Aalborg Stadion	Aalborg BK	2–1	Aarhus GF
15 September 1996	Aarhus Stadion	Aarhus GF	6–1	Aalborg BK
6 April 1997	Aarhus Stadion	Aarhus GF	0–1	Aalborg BK
2 May 1997	Aalborg Stadion	Aalborg BK	1–1	Aarhus GF
29 August 1997	Aarhus Stadion	Aarhus GF	0–1	Aalborg BK
26 October 1997	Aarhus Stadion	Aarhus GF	4–1	Aalborg BK
19 April 1998	Aalborg Stadion	Aalborg BK	2–4	Aarhus GF
26 July 1998	Aalborg Stadion	Aalborg BK	4–0	Aarhus GF
7 March 1999	Aarhus Stadion	Aarhus GF	1–0	Aalborg BK
19 April 1999	Aalborg Stadion	Aalborg BK	2–1	Aarhus GF
21 August 1999	Aalborg Stadion	Aalborg BK	1–0	Aarhus GF
1 November 1999	Aarhus Stadion	Aarhus GF	1–1	Aalborg BK
25 May 2000	Aalborg Stadion	Aalborg BK	1–1	Aarhus GF
17 September 2000	Aalborg Stadion	Aalborg BK	2–1	Aarhus GF
1 April 2001	Aalborg Stadion	Aalborg BK	5–1	Aarhus GF
10 June 2001	Aarhus Stadion	Aarhus GF	4–0	Aalborg BK
29 July 2001	Aarhus Stadion	Aarhus GF	1–3	Aalborg BK
22 October 2001	Aalborg Stadion	Aalborg BK	1–4	Aarhus GF
14 April 2002	Aarhus Stadion	Aarhus GF	2–2	Aalborg BK
4 October 2002	Aalborg Stadion	Aalborg BK	1–2	Aarhus GF
1 December 2002	Aarhus Stadion	Aarhus GF	1–0	Aalborg BK
16 April 2003	Aalborg Stadion	Aalborg BK	2–0	Aarhus GF
28 September 2003	Aalborg Stadion	Aalborg BK	2–1	Aarhus GF
14 March 2004	Aarhus Stadion	Aarhus GF	0–1	Aalborg BK
12 April 2004	Aalborg Stadion	Aalborg BK	4–1	Aarhus GF
17 October 2004	Aarhus Stadion	Aarhus GF	2–2	Aalborg BK
3 November 2004	Aarhus Stadion	Aarhus GF	2–1	Aalborg BK
7 May 2005	Aalborg Stadion	Aalborg BK	3–1	Aarhus GF
17 September 2005	Aarhus Stadion	Aarhus GF	2–4	Aalborg BK
23 October 2005	Aalborg Stadion	Aalborg BK	1–1	Aarhus GF
23 April 2006	NRGi Park	Aarhus GF	1–1	Aalborg BK
12 August 2007	Aalborg Stadion	Aalborg BK	2–0	Aarhus GF
8 October 2007	NRGi Park	Aarhus GF	3–5	Aalborg BK
8 May 2008	Energi Nord Arena	Aalborg BK	3–1	Aarhus GF
13 September 2008	Energi Nord Arena	Aalborg BK	0–2	Aarhus GF
5 April 2009	NRGi Park	Aarhus GF	1–2	Aalborg BK
11 May 2009	Energi Nord Arena	Aalborg BK	1–1	Aarhus GF
20 July 2009	NRGi Park	Aarhus GF	1–0	Aalborg BK
23 November 2009	Energi Nord Arena	Aalborg BK	0–0	Aarhus GF
10 April 2010	NRGi Park	Aarhus GF	0–2	Aalborg BK
24 July 2011	Energi Nord Arena	Aalborg BK	2–1	Aarhus GF
27 November 2011	Energi Nord Arena	Aalborg BK	0–2	Aarhus GF
16 April 2012	NRGi Park	Aarhus GF	1–1	Aalborg BK
13 July 2012	NRGi Park	Aarhus GF	1–1	Aalborg BK
3 December 2012	Nordjyske Arena	Aalborg BK	0–3	Aarhus GF
16 May 2013	NRGi Park	Aarhus GF	3–0	Aalborg BK
29 September 2013	Nordjyske Arena	Aalborg BK	0–0	Aarhus GF
8 March 2014	NRGi Park	Aarhus GF	2–5	Aalborg BK
18 May 2014	Nordjyske Arena	Aalborg BK	1–0	Aarhus GF
15 August 2015	Ceres Park	Aarhus GF	2–3	Aalborg BK
18 March 2016	Nordjyske Arena	Aalborg BK	2–2	Aarhus GF
17 May 2016	Ceres Park	Aarhus GF	2–0	Aalborg BK
28 August 2016	Nordjyske Arena	Aalborg BK	2–1	Aarhus GF
19 February 2017	Ceres Park	Aarhus GF	1-2	Aalborg BK
17 April 2017	Nordjyske Arena	Aalborg BK	1-0	Aarhus GF
24 April 2017	Ceres Park	Aarhus GF	4-0	Aalborg BK
26 August 2017	Aalborg Portland Park	Aalborg BK	0-0	Aarhus GF
18 March 2018	Ceres Park	Aarhus GF	0-0	Aalborg BK
21 October 2018	Ceres Park	Aarhus GF	2-2	Aalborg BK
17 March 2019	Aalborg Portland Park	Aalborg BK	3-1	Aarhus GF
5 May 2019	Aalborg Portland Park	Aalborg BK	0-1	Aarhus GF
12 May 2019	Ceres Park	Aarhus GF	2-0	Aalborg BK
15 September 2019	Ceres Park	Aarhus GF	3-0	Aalborg BK

This gives a total of:

	Aab wins	Draws	AGF wins	Sum
Sum	36	20	27	83

== Danish Cup games ==
The different matches which Aalborg BK and Aarhus GF have played against each other in Danish Cup:

Aalborg win Draw Aarhus win

Competition	Round	Venue	Home team	Result	Away team
1986–87 Danish Cup	Final	Idrætspark	Aarhus	3–0	Aalborg
1987–88 Danish Cup	Quarter-final	Aarhus Stadium	Aarhus	3–1	Aalborg
1991–92 Danish Cup	Quarter-final	Aarhus Stadium	Aarhus	4–1	Aalborg
2013–14 Danish Cup	Quarter-final	NRGi Park	Aarhus	1–4	Aalborg
2015–16 Danish Cup	Semi-final 1st leg	Nordjyske Arena	Aalborg	0–2	Aarhus
2015–16 Danish Cup	Semi-final 2nd leg	Ceres Park	Aarhus	2–2	Aalborg
2019–20 Danish Cup	Semi-final	Aalborg Portland Park	Aalborg	3–2	Aarhus

Summary

Played	Aalborg wins	Draws	Aarhus wins	Aalborg goals	Aarhus goals
7	2	1	4	11	17

== Statistics ==
=== Honours ===
Aarhus	Competition	Aalborg
6	Danish 1st Division/Danish Superliga	4
9	Danish Cup	3
3	Provinsmesterskabsturneringen	1
18	Total	8

Note: Danish 1st Division titles are from before the inception of Danish Superliga.

=== Players who have played for both clubs ===
Player	Aarhus career			Aalborg career		
Player	Span	League apps	League goals	Span	League apps	League goals
(Denmark) Bjørn Kristensen	1982–1989	165	19	1995–1997	–	–
(Denmark) Søren Andersen	1989–1993; 2001–2003	109; 18	51; 6	1995–1998	67	30
(Denmark) Morten Rasmussen	2002–2006; 2016–2018	103; 54	28; 27	2011	14	6
(Denmark) Daniel Christensen	2014–2016	70	1	2008–2011	28	0
(Denmark) Casper Sloth	2009–2014	133	9	2016–2017	21	0
