= Andreas Holm Jensen =

Danish footballer (born 1988)

Personal information
- Date of birth: 7 December 1988 (age 37)
- Place of birth: Denmark
- Height: 1.93 m (6 ft 4 in)
- Position: Centre back

Senior career*
Years	Team	Apps	(Gls)
- Næstved BK
2015–2020	Helsingør	116	(3)
- * Club domestic league appearances and goals as of 19:11, 3 August 2020 (UTC)

Andreas Holm Jensen (born 7 December 1988) is a Danish footballer. He currently plays at Nyköbing FC.
