= Thomas Thomasberg =

Danish footballer (born 1974)

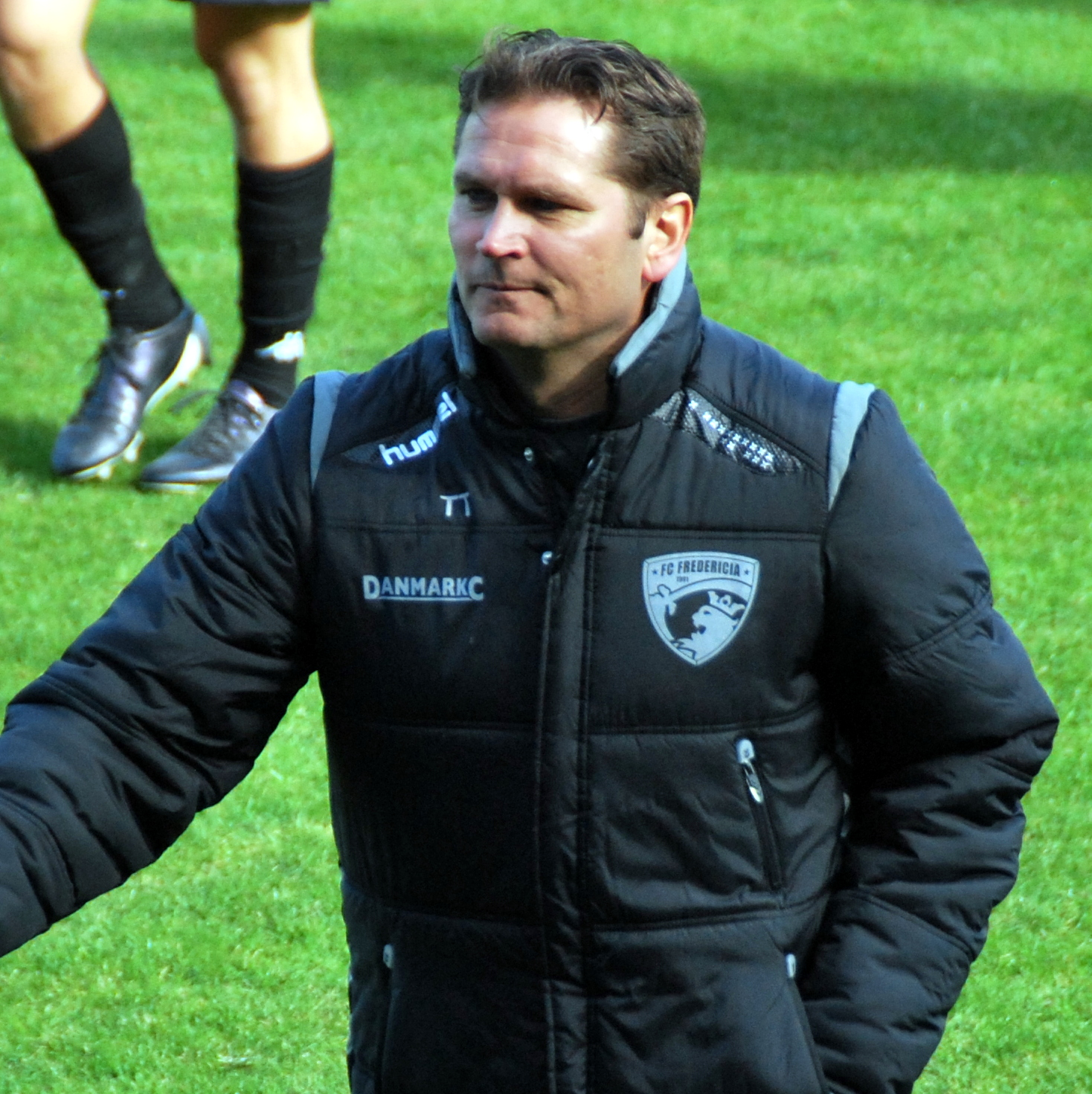
- Thomasberg with Fredericia in 2013

Personal information
- Date of birth: 15 October 1974 (age 52)
- Place of birth: Haverslev, Rebild, Denmark
- Position: Midfielder

Team information
- Current team: OB (manager)

Youth career
- Haverslev IF
- Aars IK

Senior career*
Years	Team	Apps	(Gls)
1991–1999	AaB	173	(20)
1999–2004	Midtjylland	108	(8)

International career
1990	Denmark U16	4	(0)

Managerial career
- 2008–2009: Midtjylland
- 2010: Hjørring
- 2010–2013: Fredericia
- 2017–2018: Hobro
- 2018–2023: Randers
- 2023–2025: Midtjylland
- 2025–2026: Pogoń Szczecin
- 2026–: OB
- * Club domestic league appearances and goals

Thomas Thomasberg (born 15 October 1974) is a Danish professional football manager and former player who is currently in charge of Danish Superliga club OB.

== Playing career ==
As a youth player, Thomasberg played for hometown club Haverslev IF as well as Aars IK, before joining AaB in 1991. He made his debut for the first team only in 1994, after having played for the reserves in the fourth-tier Denmark Series for a number of seasons. Thomasberg played for AaB until 1999, after which he moved to FC Midtjylland. He won the Danish Superliga championship as a player with AaB in both the 1994–95 and 1998–99 seasons. In 1990, he also gained four caps for the Denmark under-16 team.

== Managerial career ==
In 2004, Thomasberg announced his retirement and became assistant coach to Erik Rasmussen at FC Midtjylland. He later became Rasmussen's successor as the head coach. He remained in that position for a year before being dismissed on 11 August 2009 and replaced by Allan Kuhn after to a poor start to the season.

Later that year, it was confirmed that Thomasberg would take over as head coach of FC Hjørring from 1 January 2010. He held that position for half a year, during which he managed to lead the club to promotion the second-tier 1st Division. Thomasberg then became the head coach of FC Fredericia, who, however, discontinued their collaboration with Thomasberg on 8 April 2013.

After being an assistant at Randers FC from 2013 to 2016, Thomasberg was presented as the new head coach for Hobro IK in the 1st Division on 5 January 2017 on a contract running until the summer of 2018.

Thomasberg since took over as head coach of Randers FC. He was originally supposed to have stepped into the role on 1 October 2018, but Randers and Hobro reached an agreement that enabled Thomasberg to take over with immediate effect in his new club as of 16 June 2018.

On 23 March 2023, Thomasberg was named the new head coach of FC Midtjylland, signing a contract through the summer of 2023. After two-and-a-half seasons, he was sacked by the club on 29 August 2025, the day after the club qualified for the 2025–26 UEFA Europa League. He was allowed to coach his final match for the club later on 31 August against Brøndby.

On 30 September 2025, Thomasberg was announced as the new manager of Polish Ekstraklasa club Pogoń Szczecin on a three-year deal. He managed his first game against Piast Gliwice and won 2–1 on 3 October 2025. He was relieved of his duties on 22 June 2026.

On 30 July 2026, Thomasberg replaced Alexander Zorniger as the manager of Danish Superliga club Odense Boldklub.

== Managerial statistics ==
As of match played 22 November 2026

Managerial record by team and tenure
Team	From	To	Record								Ref
Team	From	To	G	W	D	L	GF	GA	GD	Win %	Ref
Midtjylland	1 July 2008	11 August 2009	42	20	8	14	71	57	+14	47.62	
Hjørring	1 January 2010	30 June 2010	15	10	3	2	28	14	+14	66.67	
Fredericia	1 July 2010	8 April 2013	91	36	23	32	140	119	+21	39.56	
Hobro	4 January 2017	16 June 2018	52	23	12	17	75	57	+18	44.23	
Randers	16 June 2018	23 March 2023	187	73	47	67	261	245	+16	39.04	
Midtjylland	23 March 2023	31 August 2025	117	66	23	28	239	144	+95	56.41	
Pogoń Szczecin	30 September 2025	22 June 2026	26	11	5	10	35	32	+3	42.31	
OB	30 July 2026	present	16	6	5	5	21	22	−1	37.50	
Career Total			546	245	126	175	871	690	+181	44.87	—

== Honours ==
=== Player ===
AaB

- Danish Superliga: 1994–95, 1998–99
