= Odense Boldklub =

Association football club in Denmark

Odense BK
- Full name: Odense Boldklub
- Nicknames: De Stribede (The Striped); Striwerne (The Striped in Eastern-Funish dialect)
- Short name: OB
- Founded: 12 July 1887; 139 years ago
- Ground: Nature Energy Park
- Capacity: 15,790
- Owner(s): Odense Sport & Event
- Chairman: Niels Thorborg
- Head coach: Thomas Thomasberg
- League: Superliga
- 2025–26: Superliga, 8th of 12
- Website: www.ob.dk
Home colours	Away colours	Third colours

Odense Boldklub (Danish pronunciation: [ˈoˀðn̩sə ˈpʌlˀtkʰlup]; also known as Odense BK or the more commonly used OB) is a Danish professional football club based in the city of Odense, in southern Denmark. The club has won three Danish championships and five Danish Cup trophies. OB play in the Danish Superliga and their home field is Nature Energy Park. OB's clubhouse is located in Ådalen near Odense River.

== History ==
=== Early history ===
OB were founded on 12 July 1887 as Odense Cricketklub, with cricket the only sport. In 1889, football and tennis departments were included in the club, and it changed name to the present Odense Boldklub. The club were then located in Munke Mose (The Monks bog) in Odense. OB moved to Ådalen in 1968, where the club still trains today.

In 1916, OB won the province championship for the first time and qualified to the semi-final of the Danish championship. They lost this match 3–9 to later champions B.93 from Copenhagen.

=== 1945–1975: Mixed results ===
When the Danish championship was reorganized after the Occupation of Denmark during World War II, OB were placed in the third best league, then named the Danish 3rd Division. After good help from the top goalscorers Svend Jørgen Hansen and Jørgen Leschly Sørensen, the club were quickly promoted to the best league. Svend Jørgen Hansen became OB's first Danish national team player in 1942, while Jørgen Leschly Sørensen was sold to the professional Italian team Atalanta in 1949.

In 1951, OB won their first medals, when the club won silver after runaway champions Akademisk Boldklub. Following the early success, it went down hill for the club. OB were relegated to the second-tier Danish 2nd Division in 1955, and the team had a hard time regaining its position in the top of Danish football. Despite promotions to the Danish 1st Division in 1957 and 1966, the club did not succeed to permanently stay in the top-flight until the promotion in 1975.

It did not help that the local rivals from B 1909 and B 1913 stayed in the top of the 1st Division in this period, where B 1909 won the 1959 and 1964 Danish championships. The intense local rivalry culminated in 1973, when 28,000 spectators watched the 2nd Division match between De Stribede and De røde (B 1909) on Odense Stadion. The match is still the spectator record for an OB home game.

In 1974, the club were in their first Danish Cup final, where the team lost 5–2 to Vanløse IF. Per Bartram from OB were awarded the title as Cup Fighter.

=== 1975–1990: The golden years ===
In 1975, OB was once more promoted to the 1st Division. This time the club had the players to be a top team in the best league under the reign of coach Richard Møller Nielsen. Just two years later, OB won their first Danish championship in the 1977 season. OB's midfielder Allan Hansen was the top goalscorer in the 1st Division and he was awarded as 1977 Danish Player of the Year' award, a double triumph he repeated in 1981.

The championship win meant that OB played their first European matches in 1978. They competed in the 1978 European Cup, where they lost in the first round to Bulgarian side Lokomotiv Sofia.

In 1980, OB won bronze and the Danish championship was won for the second time in 1982. As Richard Møller Nielsen's OB team were one of the dominating teams in Danish football in this period, B 1909 finished last in the 1982 1st Division, and were relegated to the 2nd Division. This made OB the best team of the Funen region. In 1983 OB took the cup to win their – so far – only The Double (with the 82' championship).

The team's success was built on many talented Danish players, counting 1982 Danish 1st Division Talent of the Year Keld Bordinggaard. The most prolific OB player of the era was goalkeeper Lars Høgh, who was a constant part of the team from 1977 to 1999 as he played a club record of 817 total matches for the first team.

In 1989, the club won the Danish championship again ahead of defending champions Brøndby IF under new manager Roald Poulsen. The profiles of Roald Poulsen's team included, apart from Lars Høgh, the midfielder Ulrik Moseby, the big defender Johnny Hansen, and the young forward Per Pedersen, who became the most expensive OB player sold, when he was bought by English team Blackburn Rovers for £2.3 million in 1997.

=== 1991–present: OB in the Superliga ===
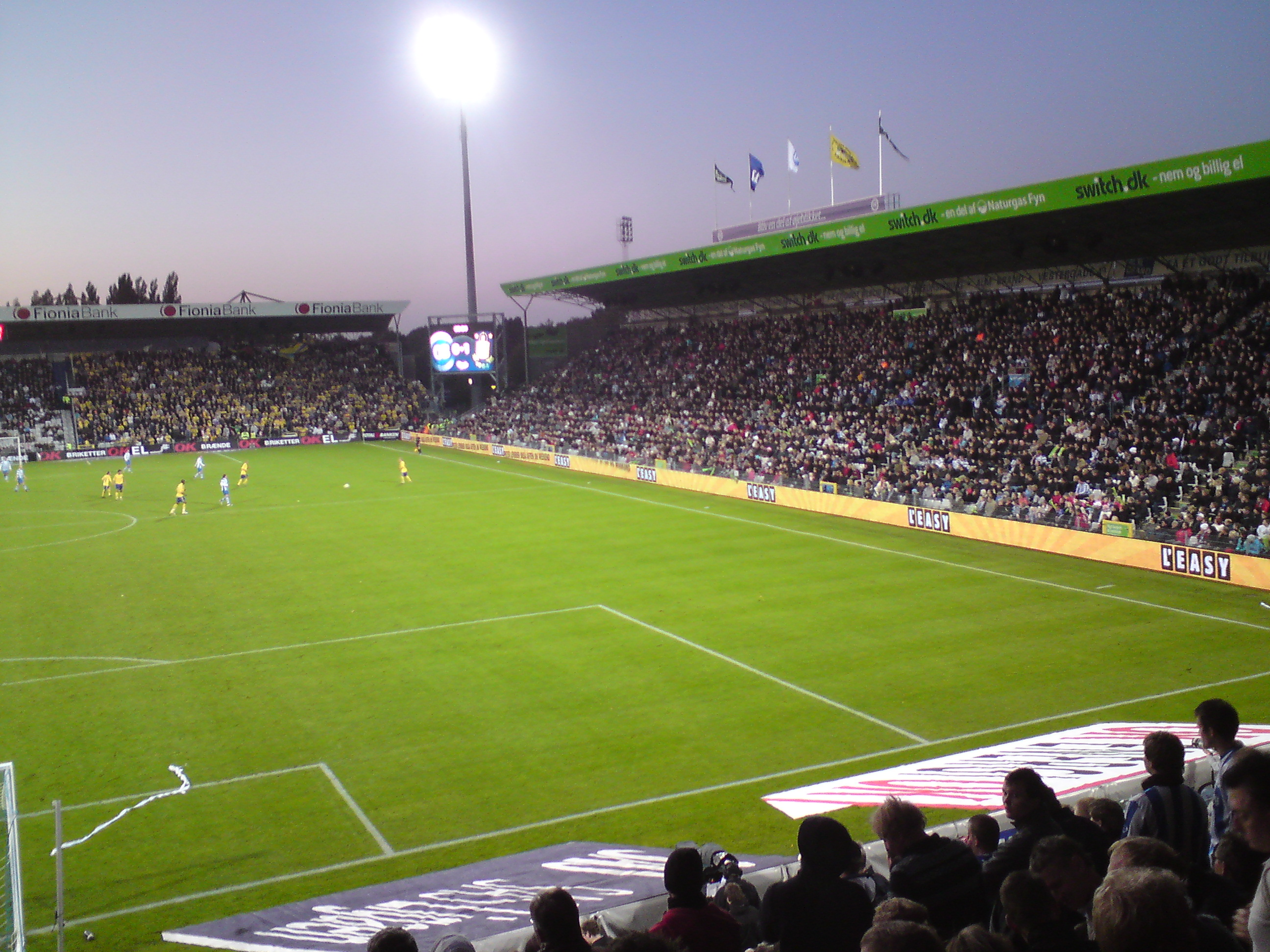
Odense Stadium during a Superliga game between OB and Brøndby in 2008.

1991 was a special year for OB. They won the Danish Cup final against AaB after two goalless matches, extra time and penalty shootout. As the national arena Idrætsparken were under reconstruction in 1991, the final was played home at Odense Stadion. The cup success was not matched in the league, now known as the Danish Superliga. After the main tournament of the 1991–92 season, OB was relegated to the Qualifying League.

They finished in second place of the 1992 Qualifying League, and OB were back in the Superliga for the 1992–93 season. In that season, the club won silver medals after F.C. Copenhagen and they won their third Danish Cup trophy in 1993.

As the Danish Football Association (DBU) restructured the Superliga before the 1995–96 season, and introduced a league format of 33 games spanning a full year; OB won bronze once more. Even though the team had many profiles and good players, the team lacked stability and in the 1997–98 season, and OB ended last with six season victories to suffer relegation to the second-tier league, the Danish 1st Division.

The club were runaway winners of the 1999 1st Division and subsequently returned to the Superliga for the 1999–2000 season. OB won the 2002 Danish Cup with a 2–1 victory against Copenhagen at Parken Stadium. Since their promotion 1999, OB's best league performance has been second place, occurring in the 2008–09 season. In 2006, OB ended third, its first top-three finish in ten years. Furthermore, the club had fourth-place finishes in 2003, 2004 and 2007.

In the 2006–07 season, OB finished fourth in the league after a close race in the last rounds. Nonetheless, OB won the Danish Cup after defeating Copenhagen 2–1, which gave OB the opportunity to qualify for the UEFA Cup for the second-straight year.

In the 2007–08 season, OB once again ended in fourth, which gave a chance to qualify to the UEFA Cup through the Intertoto Cup. On 19 and 26 July 2008, they played English side Aston Villa in the third round of the Intertoto Cup for the right to play in the second round of the UEFA Cup. OB managed a 2–2 home draw on 19 July, but a 1–0 away defeat on 26 July resulted in a 2–3 aggregate loss to Villa.

OB finished second in the 2008–09 season, which led to a two-game playoff with Genoa for participation in the 2009–10 UEFA Europa League. The first leg away at the Stadio Luigi Ferraris resulted in a 3–1 defeat, and the home game a 1–1 draw. In 2009–10, OB once again finished second in the league. After a fantastic start of the season the club disappointingly did not take the first place, due to a string of lost and drawn games in the spring of 2010. OB were drawn to face Scottish club Motherwell in the fourth qualifying round of the 2010–11 Europa League.

In the 2023-24 season OB was relegated for the first time in 26 years. The relegation was confirmed in the second last round. They finished 7th in the regular season, but bad results in the relegation group would see them finish 11th.

The following season they won the Danish 1st Division and was therefore promoted to the Superliga again. They lost just 1 match in the regular season, and 2 in the promotion round. Afterwards they brought in German manager Alexander Zorniger to replace Søren Krogh, as the club felt they 'needed more experience'.

=== 1994–95: "The Miracle in Madrid" ===
In the 1994–95 UEFA Cup, OB reached beyond the first round in a European tournament for the first time in club history. The team beat several opponents and most famously defeated Real Madrid to reach the quarter-final of the tournament.

In the first round, OB won both the home and away game 3–0 against Estonian Flora Tallinn. In the second round, they drew 1–1 in the away game against Northern Irish club Linfield and won 5–0 at home, including two long-range goals by defender Steen Nedergaard. In the third round, the played German team 1. FC Kaiserslautern, where OB managed a 1–1 draw in Germany and a 0–0 draw at home; OB advanced on the away goals rule.

In the fourth round, the opponent was Real Madrid, which at that time had Danish national team captain Michael Laudrup on the team. The first match was played at a sold-out Odense Stadion, and OB surprisingly scored on a corner kick in the first half. In the second half, Real Madrid quickly scored two goals, but OB managed to come back into the game, when they equalized to 2–2. Shortly before full-time, Real Madrid scored to 2–3, which was the final result of the game.

Due to the away goals rule, OB needed to win with a margin of two goals to advance to the quarter-finals. Ulrik Pedersen scored for a 1–0 lead to OB, and with a good goalkeeping by Lars Høgh, OB kept Real Madrid from scoring. With a goal by Morten Bisgaard shortly before stoppage time, OB achieved the needed 2–0 victory, and advanced to the quarter-final. OB's victory attracted attention in great parts of Europe and in Denmark the event was named "The Miracle in Madrid."

In the quarter-final, OB met Parma. In the first game away in Parma, OB and Lars Høgh almost prevented the Italians from scoring, but Steen Nedergaard committed a penalty which Parma converted and thus won the game 1–0. The second leg in Odense ended a 0–0 draw, which meant the end of OB's European adventure.

In recent years, OB has yo-yo'd between the Danish Superliga and 1. Division, most recently enjoying promotion back to the top flight in 2025.

== Players ==
=== Current squad ===
As of 2 September 2026

Note: Flags indicate national team as defined under FIFA eligibility rules; some limited exceptions apply. Players may hold more than one non-FIFA nationality.

No.	Pos.	Nation	Player
1	GK	DEN	Martin Hansen
2	DF	DEN	Peter Therkildsen
3	DF	DEN	Adam Sørensen
4	DF	GER	Julian Pauli (on loan from Köln)
5	DF	NOR	Ulrik Yttergård Jenssen
7	FW	GER	Fiete Arp
8	MF	DEN	Rasmus Falk (captain)
9	FW	FIN	Topi Keskinen
10	MF	FIN	Anssi Suhonen
11	FW	GER	Jona Niemiec
13	DF	DEN	Julius Berthel Askou
14	MF	DEN	Christian Gammelgaard
15	DF	DEN	Marcus McCoy

No.	Pos.	Nation	Player
16	GK	NOR	Viljar Myhra
17	FW	GER	Noah Ganaus
19	MF	DEN	Nikolaj Juul-Sandberg
21	MF	DEN	Vitus Friis
22	MF	BFA	Ismahila Ouédraogo
23	MF	DEN	William Martin
24	DF	NOR	Mikkel Rakneberg (on loan from Bochum)
25	DF	DEN	Adam Amrani
26	FW	DEN	Lasse Legolas
27	GK	DEN	Marcus Eskildsen
28	FW	DEN	Magnus Andersen
29	DF	GAM	James Gomez
31	FW	SUR	Jay-Roy Grot

=== Club captains ===
Name	Period
(Denmark) Kim Ziegler	1987–1992
(Denmark) Lars Høgh	1992–2000
(Denmark) Michael Hemmingsen	2000–2004
(Denmark) Steen Nedergaard	2004–2005
(Denmark) Ulrik Laursen	2005–2008
(Denmark) Chris Sørensen	2008–2012
(Denmark) Anders Møller Christensen	2012–2014
(Iceland) Ari Skúlason	2014–2015
(Iceland) Hallgrímur Jónasson	2015–2016

Name	Period
(Denmark) Kenneth Emil Petersen	2016–2018
(Denmark) Janus Drachmann	2018–2021
(Denmark) Jens Jakob Thomasen	2021–2022
(Denmark) Jeppe Tverskov	2022–2023
(Denmark) Bjørn Paulsen	2023–2024
(Sweden) Filip Helander	2024
(Denmark) Bashkim Kadrii	2024
(Norway) Viljar Myhra	2025
(Denmark) Rasmus Falk	2025—

=== Awards ===
Player of the Year
Year	Name	Nationality	Position
2009	Eric Djemba-Djemba	Cameroon	Midfielder
2010	Hans Henrik Andreasen	Denmark	Midfielder
2011	Espen Ruud	Norway	Defender
2012	Rasmus Falk	Denmark	Forward
2013	Emil Larsen	Denmark	Midfielder
2014	Rasmus Falk (2)	Denmark	Forward
2015	Rasmus Falk (3)	Denmark	Forward
2016	Sten Grytebust	Norway	Goalkeeper
2017	Sten Grytebust (2)	Norway	Goalkeeper
2018	Jeppe Tverskov	Denmark	Defender
2019	Jeppe Tverskov (2)	Denmark	Defender
2020	Oliver Christensen	Denmark	Goalkeeper
2021	Aron Elís Thrándarson	Iceland	Midfielder
2022	Jeppe Tverskov (3)	Denmark	Defender
2023	Tobias Slotsager	Denmark	Defender
2024	Luca Kjerrumgaard	Denmark	Forward
2025	Max Ejdum	Denmark	Midfielder

Talent of the Year
Year	Name	Nationality	Position
2009	Rúrik Gíslason	Iceland	Midfielder
2010	Bashkim Kadrii	Denmark	Forward
2011	Rasmus Falk	Denmark	Forward
2012	Kasper Larsen	Denmark	Defender
2013	Mohammed Diarra	Guinea	Defender
2014	Mikkel Desler	Denmark	Midfielder
2015	Mathias Greve	Denmark	Midfielder
2016	Jens Jakob Thomasen	Denmark	Midfielder
2017	Julius Eskesen	Denmark	Midfielder
2018	Mathias Jørgensen	Denmark	Forward
2019	Oliver Christensen	Denmark	Goalkeeper
2020	Mads Frøkjær-Jensen	Denmark	Midfielder
2021	Hans Christian Bernat	Denmark	Goalkeeper
2022	Yankuba Minteh	(The Gambia) Gambia	Forward
2023	Tobias Slotsager	Denmark	Defender
2024	Max Ejdum and William Martin (Note: Ejdum and Martin got the same number of votes, and therefore both players were awarded the prize. For the first time in the club's history two players were handed the same prize.)	Denmark	Forward
2025	Julius Berthel Askou	Denmark	Defender

== Club officials ==
- Owner: Odense Sport & Event

=== Odense Boldklub ===
- Board chairman: (Denmark) Niels Thorborg
- Chief executive: (Denmark) Enrico Augustinus
- Commercial chief: (Denmark) Jack Jørgensen
- Communication chief: (Denmark) Rasmus Nejstgaard

=== Club management ===
- Sportsdirector: (Denmark) Troels Bech
- Head of recruitment: (Denmark) Jimmi Nagel Jacobsen
- Head of academy: (Denmark) Tonny Hermansen
- Academy scout: (Denmark) Anders Møller Christensen
- Sports administrator: (Denmark) Bolette Mai Salomonsen
- Material: (Denmark) Thomas Johansson
- Team leader: (Denmark) Elhardt Holm

=== Coaching and medical staff ===
- Head coach: (Denmark) Thomas Thomasberg
- Assistant coaches: (Hungary) Tamás Bódog; (Germany) Jurek Rohrberg
- Goalkeeping coach: (Denmark) Lars Bjerring
- Physical coach: (Denmark) Bo Nielsen
- Physical coach: (Denmark) Peter Krustrup
- Mental coach: (Denmark) Troels Banggaard
- Transition coach: (Denmark) Thomas Skou Juul Jensen
- Performance Manager: (Germany) Jurek Rohrberg
- Performance Analyst: (Denmark) Jesper Sangild
- Scout: (Denmark) Thomas Helveg
- Doctor: (Germany) Thomas Haller
- Doctor: (Denmark) Daniel Roosen
- Head of Medical: (Denmark) Daniel Borgen
- Physioterapist: (Denmark) Thomas Almestrand
- Masseur: (Morocco) Mustapha Lamnaouar

== Honours ==
- Danish Football Championship
  - Winners (3): 1977, 1982, 1989
  - Runners-up (6): 1950–51, 1983, 1992–93, 2008–09, 2009–10, 2010–11
- Danish Cup
  - Winners (5): 1982–83, 1990–91, 1992–93, 2001–02, 2006–07
  - Runners-up (2): 1973–74, 2021–22
- Danish Super Cup
  - Runners-up (1): 2002
- Provinsmesterskabsturneringen
  - Winners (1): 1916
  - Runners-up (2): 1917, 1919
- Funen Football Championship
  - Winners (18) – record: 1904–05, 1905–06, 1906–07, 1908–09, 1911–12, 1914–15, 1915–16, 1916–17, 1917–18, 1918–19, 1924–25, 1928–29, 1936–37, 1940–41, 1960^{‡}, 1963^{‡}, 1974^{‡}, 1975^{‡}
  - Runners-up (15): 1909–10, 1910–11, 1913–14, 1919–20, 1921–22, 1927–28, 1930–31, 1931–32, 1939–40, 1950–51^{‡}, 1951–52^{‡}, 1953–54^{‡}, 1954–55^{‡}, 1961^{‡}, 1976^{‡}
- FBUs Pokalturnering
  - Winners (5): 1920, 1924, 1948, 1949, 1951
  - Runners-up (13): 1921, 1922, 1925, 1926, 1929, 1931, 1933, 1937, 1938, 1942, 1946, 1950, 1953

^{‡}: Honour achieved by reserve team

=== Achievements ===
- 50 seasons in the Highest Danish League
- 16 seasons in the Second Highest Danish League
- 1 season in Third Highest Danish League

=== All-Star Team ===

"De Største Striber"

At the club's 125-year anniversary the fans elected the best OB players of all time. It was called De Største Striber (The Greatest Stripes) and consists of 11 players and a coach. Each month in 2012 the fans voted for their favourite player, and in the end of the year the team was complete. The nominees was selected by Leif Rasmussen (Fyens Stiftstidende), Uffe Pedersen (OB), Anders Rørtoft Madsen (OB), Peter Borberg (author), Jacob Lind (previous chairman of the fanclub).

- Goalkeeper: Lars Høgh
- Right back: Thomas Helveg
- Centre back: Michael Hemmingsen
- Centre back: Allan "Skæg" Nielsen
- Left back: Chris Sørensen
- Right midfielder: Søren Berg
- Centre midfielder: Andrew Tembo
- Centre midfielder: Allan Hansen
- Left midfielder: Preben "Tordenskjold" Knudsen
- Striker: Jørgen Leschly Sørensen
- Striker: Mwape Miti
- Coach: Richard Møller Nielsen

=== Managerial history ===
Name	Period
(England) Denis Neville	1948–1950
(Hungary) Géza Toldi	1950–1954
(Denmark) Jørgen Leschly Sørensen	1955–1958
(Denmark) Svend Hugger	1961
(Socialist Federal Republic of Yugoslavia) Dragiša Milić	1961–1963
(Denmark) Jørgen Leschly Sørensen (2)	1963
(Denmark) Børge Jacobsen	1964–1968
(United States) Jack Johnson	1969–1972
(Denmark) Kaj Hansen	1972–1974
(Denmark) Richard Møller Nielsen	1975–1985
(Denmark) Walther Richter	1986–1987

Name	Period
(Denmark) Roald Poulsen	1988–1991
(Denmark) Kim Brink	1991–1995
(Denmark) Viggo Jensen	1995–1997
(Denmark) Roald Poulsen (2)	1997–1998
(Denmark) Jens Plambech	1998
(Denmark) Torben Storm	1999–2000
(Denmark) Troels Bech	2000–2002
(Denmark) Uffe Pedersen	2002–2004
(Denmark) Klavs Rasmussen (Denmark) Troels Bech (2)	2004–2005
(Scotland) Bruce Rioch	2005–2007

Name	Period
(Denmark) Lars Olsen	2007–2010
(Denmark) Uffe Pedersen* (2)	2010
(Denmark) Henrik Clausen	2010–2012
(Denmark) Poul Hansen*	2012
(Denmark) Troels Bech (3)	2012–2014
(Denmark) Ove Pedersen	2014–2015
(Denmark) Kent Nielsen	2015–2018
(Denmark) Jakob Michelsen	2018–2021
(Sweden) Andreas Alm	2021–2023
(Denmark) Søren Krogh	2023–2025
(Germany) Alexander Zorniger	2025–2026
(Denmark) Thomas Thomasberg	2026–

Note: * Temporary manager

== Sponsorship ==
Period	Kit manufacturer	Shirt sponsor	
Period	Kit manufacturer	Brand	Sleeve
1972–1977	None	Texaco	None
1977–1978	Puma	Texaco	None
1978–1980	Puma	unknown	None
1980–1985	Puma	Paaskebrød	None
1985–1986	Puma	Nykredit	None
1986–1987	Puma	Bendix Bank	None
1987–1991	Puma	Albani	None
1991–1997	Puma	Damixa	None
1997–2001	Adidas	Damixa	None
2001–2008	Nike	Carlsberg	None
2008–2015	Puma	Carlsberg	None
2016–2018	hummel	Carlsberg	None
2018–2021	hummel	Albani	None
2021–2024	hummel	Albani	Unisport
2024—	hummel	Albani	BMW

Carlsberg was OB's main sponsor from 2001 to 2017, while hummel has been its kit sponsor since January 2016. Before that, Puma was the kit sponsor from the end of the 1970s to the end of the 1990s, and has been kit sponsor for every three league titles OB has won. When OB signed with Puma in 2008, the board was hoping that the history with Puma could achieve their ambition with two league titles before 2015.

After 16 years with Carlsberg on the front of the shirt, OB changed main sponsor to Royal Unibrew. They signed a contract until 31 May 2023, and the new sponsor on the front of the shirt would become Albani Brewery, owned by Royal Unibrew. This came into force from the summer 2017.

== OB in Europe ==
=== UEFA club coefficient ranking ===
As of 4 October 2014, Source: Bert Kassies website

Team	Year	2010	2011	2012	2013	2014
(Denmark) OB Odense	Team Rank; Points	113; 14.970	104; 18.610	112; 15.005	136; 12.640	145; 11.760
