= 2017–18 AaB Fodbold season =

AaB
2017–18 season
- Sports Director: Allan Gaarde
- Head Coach: Morten Wieghorst
- Stadium: Aalborg Portland Park
- Alka Superliga: 5th
- DBU Pokalen: Quarter-final
- Top goalscorer: League: Jannik Pohl (8); All: Jannik Pohl (9)
- Highest home attendance: 7,595 vs Brøndby IF (2 April 2018, Alka Superliga)
- Lowest home attendance: 2,116 vs AC Horsens (5 March 2018, Alka Superliga)
- Average home league attendance: 5,438
Home colours	Away colours	Third colours

The 2017–18 season was AaB's 35th consecutive season in the top flight of Danish football, 28th consecutive season in the Danish Superliga, and 132nd year in existence as a football club.

== Club ==
=== Coaching staff ===
Position	Staff
Head coach	(Denmark) Morten Wieghorst
Assistant coaches	(Denmark) Jacob Friis (Denmark) Thomas Augustinussen
Development manager	(Denmark) Poul Erik Andreasen
Goalkeeping coach	(Denmark) Poul Buus
Team Leader	(Denmark) Ernst Damborg
Doctor	(Denmark) Søren Kaalund
Physiotherapist	(Denmark) Morten Skjoldager
Physical trainer	(England) Ashley Tootle
Sports psychology consultant	(Denmark) Martin Langagergaard
U/19 League coach	(Denmark) Lasse Stensgaard
U/17 League coach	(Denmark) Adam Harell

Source: AaB Fodbold

=== Other information ===
Owner	(Denmark) AaB A/S
Chief executive	(Denmark) Stephan Schors
Sports director	(Denmark) Allan Gaarde
Sales manager	(Denmark) Lars Glinvad
Head of press and communications	(Denmark) Brian Andersen
Ground (capacity and dimensions)	Nordjyske Arena (13,997 / 105x70 metres)
Training ground	AaB Training Centre

Source: AaB Fodbold

== Squad ==
=== First team squad ===
This squad list includes any first team squad player who was available for the line-up during the season.

No.	Pos.	Nation	Player
1	GK	DEN	Nicolai Larsen (until 31 August 2017)
1	GK	SWE	Jacob Rinne (from 17 August 2017)
2	DF	DEN	Patrick Kristensen
3	DF	DEN	Jakob Ahlmann
4	DF	DEN	Jakob Blåbjerg
5	DF	DEN	Jores Okore
6	DF	DEN	Kristoffer Pallesen
8	MF	DEN	Rasmus Würtz (captain)
9	FW	DEN	Jannik Pohl
10	MF	PER	Edison Flores
11	FW	SVK	Jakub Sylvestr (until 31 December 2017)
14	FW	SVK	Pavol Šafranko (from 21 August 2017)
16	MF	DEN	Magnus Christensen
17	MF	DEN	Kasper Kusk (from 31 January 2018)
18	MF	DEN	Rasmus Thellufsen

No.	Pos.	Nation	Player
19	FW	DEN	Marco Ramkilde
20	MF	AUT	Marco Meilinger (until 12 January 2018)
21	MF	DEN	Kasper Risgård (vice-captain)
22	GK	USA	Michael Lansing
23	MF	SVK	Filip Lesniak
24	DF	DEN	Nikolaj Lyngø
25	MF	DEN	Frederik Børsting
26	MF	UGA	Robert Kakeeto
27	MF	DEN	Oliver Abildgaard
28	MF	BRA	Yann Rolim (from 31 July 2017)
30	FW	DEN	Wessam Abou Ali (from 8 February 2018)
31	DF	DEN	Mathias Andersen
32	DF	DEN	Kasper Pedersen
33	DF	ALB	Bardhec Bytyqi (until 31 January 2018)
40	GK	NZL	Tamati Williams (from 31 August 2017, until 31 December 2017)

Source: AaB Fodbold website

=== Youth players in use ===
This list includes any youth player from AaB Academy who was used in the season.

No.	Pos.	Nation	Player
20	DF	DEN	Anders Bærtelsen
29	DF	DEN	Lukas Klitten

== Transfers and loans ==
=== In ===
==== Summer ====
Squad #	Position	Player	Transferred from	Date	Source
19	FW	(Denmark) Marco Ramkilde	(Denmark) AaB Academy	19 June 2017	
24	DF	(Denmark) Nikolaj Lyngø	(Denmark) AaB Academy	19 June 2017	
31	DF	(Denmark) Mathias Andersen	(Denmark) AaB Academy	19 June 2017	
22	GK	(United States) Michael Lansing	(Denmark) Vejle Boldklub	1 July 2017	
6	DF	(Denmark) Kristoffer Pallesen	(Denmark) Viborg FF	3 July 2017	
23	MF	(Slovakia) Filip Lesniak	(England) Tottenham Hotspur F.C.	4 July 2017	
5	DF	(Denmark) Jores Okore	(Denmark) FC København	6 July 2017	
1	GK	(Sweden) Jacob Rinne	(Belgium) K.A.A. Gent	17 August 2017	
14	FW	(Slovakia) Pavol Šafranko	(Slovakia) DAC Dunajská Streda	21 August 2017	
40	GK	(New Zealand) Tamati Williams	(Netherlands) RKC Waalwijk	31 August 2017	

==== Winter ====
Squad #	Position	Player	Transferred from	Date	Source
17	MF	(Denmark) Kasper Kusk	(Denmark) FC København	31 January 2018	
30	FW	(Denmark) Wessam Abou Ali	(Denmark) AaB Academy	8 February 2018	

=== Out ===
==== Summer ====
Squad #	Position	Player	Transferred to	Date	Source
11	FW	(Denmark) Nicklas Helenius	(Denmark) OB	1 July 2017	
31	DF	(Denmark) Joakim Mæhle	(Belgium) K.R.C. Genk	1 July 2017	
7	FW	(Denmark) Thomas Enevoldsen	(Netherlands) NAC Breda	1 July 2017	
28	FW	(Denmark) Sebastian Grønning	(Denmark) Hobro IK	6 July 2017	
5	DF	(Sweden) Markus Holgersson	(Spain) Lorca FC	12 July 2017	
14	MF	(Denmark) Casper Sloth	(Denmark) Silkeborg IF	13 July 2017	
1	GK	(Denmark) Nicolai Larsen	(Denmark) FC Nordsjælland	31 August 2017	

==== Winter ====
Squad #	Position	Player	Transferred to	Date	Source
11	FW	(Slovakia) Jakub Sylvestr	(Israel) Beitar Jerusalem F.C.	1 January 2018	
24	DF	(Denmark) Morten Rokkedal	(Denmark) Løgstør IF	1 January 2018	
40	GK	(New Zealand) Tamati Williams	Retirement	1 January 2018	
20	MF	(Austria) Marco Meilinger	(Austria) SCR Altach	12 January 2018	

=== Loan in ===
Squad #	Position	Player	Loaned from	Start	End	Source
28	MF	(Brazil) Yann Rolim	(Brazil) Barra FC	31 July 2017	30 June 2018	

=== Loan out ===
Squad #	Position	Player	Loaned to	Start	End	Source
24	DF	(Denmark) Morten Rokkedal	(Denmark) Thisted FC	14 June 2017	31 December 2017	
33	DF	(Albania) Bardhec Bytyqi	(Denmark) Skive IK	31 January 2018	30 June 2018	

== Friendlies ==
=== Pre-season ===
24 June 2017 Friendly	FC Midtjylland (Denmark)	1 – 0	AaB	Ramme, Denmark
13:00 CEST	Poulsen 52' (pen.)	Report		Stadium: Ramme Stadion; Referee: Michael Tykgaard

27 June 2017 Friendly	BK Häcken (Sweden)	1 – 2	AaB	Gothenburg, Sweden
17:00 CEST	Farnerud 45'; Farnerud (penalty missed) 67'	Report	Thellufsen 28'; Risgård 38'	Stadium: Bravida Arena

1 July 2017 Friendly	AaB	3 – 2	(Denmark) Vendsyssel FF	Aalborg, Denmark
13:00 CEST	Pohl 4'; Ahlmann 72'; Thellufsen 73'	Report	Moses 8'; Granlund 57'	Stadium: AaB Training Ground

8 July 2017 Friendly	F.C. Hansa Rostock (Germany)	1 – 1	AaB	Bentwisch, Germany
15:00 CEST	Benyamina 7'	Report	Pohl 89'	Stadium: Rüdiger Lau Stadion

=== Mid-season ===
13 January 2018 Friendly	Randers FC (Denmark)	0 – 1	AaB	Randers, Denmark
13:00 CET		Report	Børsting 25'	Stadium: Randers FC Training Ground

20 January 2018 Friendly	IFK Göteborg (Sweden)	1 – 3	AaB	Gothenburg, Sweden
13:00 CET	Salomonsson 31'	Report	Rolim 33'; Šafranko 51'; Kristensen 80'	Stadium: Prioritet Serneke Arena; Attendance: 2,032; Referee: Granit Maqedonci, Sweden

26 January 2018 Friendly	AaB	3 – 2	(Japan) Shonan Bellmare	Sotogrande, Spain
16:00 CET	Šafranko 83'; Abou Ali 87', 90'	Report	Ishikawa 4'; Noda 14'	Stadium: Ayala Polo Club

31 January 2018 Friendly	Sparta Praha (Czech Republic)	2 – 1	AaB	Marbella, Spain
16:00 CET	Šural 58'; Zahustel 87'		Lesniak 49'	Stadium: Dama de Noche

3 February 2018 Friendly	AaB	2 – 0	(Denmark) Thisted FC	Aalborg, Denmark
14:15 CET	Rask 32' (o.g.); Šafranko 85'	Report		Stadium: AaB Training Ground

21 March 2018 Friendly	AaB	1 – 5	(Norway) Viking FK	Aalborg, Denmark
13:00 CET	Børsting 6'	Report	Michalsen 24', 27'; Høiland 32', 66'; Danielsen 79'	Stadium: AaB Training Ground; Referee: Mads-Kristoffer Kristoffersen

== Competitions ==
=== Competition record ===
Competition	Record							
Competition	G	W	D	L	GF	GA	GD	Win %
Alka Superliga	36	10	15	11	38	44	−6	27.78
DBU Pokalen	4	3	0	1	10	5	+5	75.00
Total	40	13	15	12	48	49	−1	32.50

=== Alka Superliga ===
==== Results summary ====
Overall								Home						Away					
Pld	W	D	L	GF	GA	GD	Pts	W	D	L	GF	GA	GD	W	D	L	GF	GA	GD
36	10	15	11	38	44	−6	45	6	8	4	22	20	+2	4	7	7	16	24	−8

Last updated: 18 May 2018.
Source: Competitive matches

==== Regular season ====
Pos	Team	Pld	W	D	L	GF	GA	GD	Pts	Qualification
3	Nordsjælland	26	15	5	6	62	41	+21	50	Qualification for the Championship round
4	Copenhagen	26	13	5	8	50	33	+17	44	Qualification for the Championship round
5	Aalborg	26	8	12	6	28	27	+1	36	Qualification for the Championship round
6	Horsens	26	7	14	5	32	34	−2	35	Qualification for the Championship round
7	Hobro	26	8	8	10	33	33	0	32	Qualification for the Relegation round

Source: Danish Football Association (in Danish), Soccerway
Rules for classification: 1) Points; 2) Goal difference; 3) Goals scored; 4) Away goals scored; 5) Play-off (played on neutral ground if determining teams for different rounds); 6) Draw.

===== Matches =====
15 July 2017 1	FC København	1 – 1	AaB	Copenhagen
16:00 CEST	Santander 39'	Report	Blåbjerg 90+4'	Stadium: Telia Parken; Attendance: 11,006; Referee: Jørgen Daugbjerg Burchardt

23 July 2017 2	AaB	1 – 4	SønderjyskE	Aalborg
14:00 CEST	Pohl 19' (pen.)	Report	Zinckernagel 17' (pen.); Kløve 31'; Rømer 43'; Uhre 65'	Stadium: Aalborg Portland Park; Attendance: 6,016; Referee: Morten Krogh

30 July 2017 3	FC Nordsjælland	3 – 2	AaB	Farum
16:00 CEST	Jensen 36'; Asante 54'; Marcondes 73'	Report	Flores 25'; Tranberg 70' (o.g.)	Stadium: Right to Dream Park; Attendance: 2,309; Referee: Peter Munch Larsen

6 August 2017 4	OB	0 – 0	AaB	Odense
16:00 CEST		Report		Stadium: EWII Park; Attendance: 4,824; Referee: Peter Kjærsgaard

14 August 2017 5	AaB	1 – 1	Hobro IK	Aalborg
19:00 CEST	Risgård 22'	Report	Kirkevold 62'	Stadium: Aalborg Portland Park; Attendance: 7,283; Referee: Mads-Kristoffer Kristoffersen

18 August 2017 6	AC Horsens	0 – 0	AaB	Horsens
18:00 CEST		Report		Stadium: Casa Arena Horsens; Attendance: 3,129; Referee: Peter Munch Larsen

26 August 2017 7	AaB	0 – 0	AGF	Aalborg
17:30 CEST		Report		Stadium: Aalborg Portland Park; Attendance: 5,718; Referee: Peter Kjærsgaard

11 September 2017 8	AaB	2 – 1	Silkeborg IF	Aalborg
19:00 CEST	Blåbjerg 44'; Pohl 51' (pen.)	Report	Gammelby 45+1'	Stadium: Aalborg Portland Park; Attendance: 4,808; Referee: Jens Grabski Maae

17 September 2017 9	Brøndby IF	0 – 0	AaB	Brøndbyvester
18:00 CEST	Arajuuri (red card) 79'	Report		Stadium: Brøndby Stadion; Attendance: 13,138; Referee: Michael Johansen

24 September 2017 10	AaB	3 – 1	Lyngby BK	Aalborg
14:00 CEST	Šafranko 22'; Ahlmann 30'; Christensen 90+2'	Report	George 90+6' (pen.)	Stadium: Aalborg Portland Park; Attendance: 5,280; Referee: Jørgen Daugbjerg Burchardt

1 October 2017 11	FC Midtjylland	4 – 1	AaB	Herning
14:00 CEST	George 27' (pen.); Sørloth 42'; Novák 52'; Wikheim 84'	Report	Pohl 69'	Stadium: MCH Arena; Attendance: 7,896; Referee: Jens Grabski Maae

15 October 2017 12	AaB	1 – 0	FC Helsingør	Aalborg
14:00 CEST	Pohl 28'; Šafranko (penalty missed) 34'	Report		Stadium: Aalborg Portland Park; Attendance: 6,972; Referee: Dennis Mogensen

23 October 2017 13	Randers FC	1 – 1	AaB	Randers
19:00 CEST	Marxen 90+5'	Report	Børsting 82'	Stadium: BioNutria Park Randers; Attendance: 4,121; Referee: Anders Poulsen

29 October 2017 14	AaB	0 – 2	OB	Aalborg
18:00 CET		Report	Edmundsson 45'; Festersen 65'	Stadium: Aalborg Portland Park; Attendance: 6,137; Referee: Sandi Putros

5 November 2017 15	Hobro IK	0 – 1	AaB	Hobro
18:00 CET		Report	Børsting 4'	Stadium: DS Arena; Attendance: 4,115; Referee: Jens Grabski Maae

20 November 2017 16	AaB	0 – 1	FC Midtjylland	Aalborg
19:00 CET		Report	Wikheim 88'	Stadium: Aalborg Portland Park; Attendance: 5,876; Referee: Peter Kjærsgaard

25 November 2017 17	FC Helsingør	0 – 1	AaB	Helsingør
16:00 CET		Report	Blåbjerg 28'	Stadium: Helsingør Stadion; Attendance: 1,074; Referee: Michael Johansen

2 December 2017 18	Lyngby BK	1 – 2	AaB	Kongens Lyngby
16:00 CET	Ojo 89'	Report	Pohl 39'; Thellufsen 41'	Stadium: Lyngby Stadion; Attendance: 1,610; Referee: Sandi Putros

10 December 2017 19	AaB	1 – 1	FC København	Aalborg
16:00 CET	Lesniak 1'	Report	Santander 33'	Stadium: Aalborg Portland Park; Attendance: 6,835; Referee: Jørgen Daugbjerg Burchardt

10 February 2018 20	Silkeborg IF	3 – 2	AaB	Silkeborg
16:00 CET	Skhirtladze 8'; Gammelby 79'; Rodić 85'	Report	Børsting 50'; Rolim 84'	Stadium: JYSK Park; Attendance: 2,587; Referee: Michael Johansen

18 February 2018 21	AaB	1 – 1	Brøndby IF	Aalborg
18:00 CET	Okore 62'; Kusk (penalty missed) 31'	Report	Röcker 50'; Hermannsson (red card) 30'	Stadium: Aalborg Portland Park; Attendance: 6,711; Referee: Sandi Putros

25 February 2018 22	AaB	1 – 1	FC Nordsjælland	Aalborg
14:00 CET	Pohl 56' (pen.)	Report	Jensen 4'; Mini (red card) 85'	Stadium: Aalborg Portland Park; Attendance: 4,358; Referee: Benjamin Willaume-Jantzen

1 March 2018 23	SønderjyskE	0 – 1	AaB	Haderslev
18:00 CET		Report	Okore 4'; Christensen (red card) 75'	Stadium: Sydbank Park; Attendance: 1,515; Referee: Jens Grabski Maae

5 March 2018 24	AaB	1 – 1	AC Horsens	Aalborg
18:00 CET	Pedersen 58'	Report	Borring 60'	Stadium: Aalborg Portland Park; Attendance: 2,116; Referee: Peter Munch Larsen

11 March 2018 25	AaB	4 – 0	Randers FC	Aalborg
14:00 CET	Kusk 2'; Pedersen 17'; Rolim 67'; Pohl 82'	Report	Bager (red card) 72'	Stadium: Aalborg Portland Park; Attendance: 4,127; Referee: Michael Johansen

18 March 2018 26	AGF	0 – 0	AaB	Aarhus
17:00 CET		Report		Stadium: Ceres Park; Attendance: 8,397; Referee: Jens Grabski Maae

==== Championship round ====
Pos	Team	Pld	W	D	L	GF	GA	GD	Pts	Qualification	MID	BRØ	NOR	COP	AAB	HOR
1	Midtjylland (C)	36	27	4	5	80	39	+41	85	Qualification for the Champions League second qualifying round	—	2–3	2–1	3–2	3–0	1–0
2	Brøndby	36	24	9	3	82	37	+45	81	Qualification for the Europa League third qualifying round (Note: The highest-ranked team not already qualified for a UEFA competition progressed to the playoff match. As Brøndby IF finished in second place and also won the 2017–18 Danish Cup, F.C. Copenhagen advanced to the play-off match by virtue of its fourth place finish.)	0–1	—	3–1	2–1	1–1	5–1
3	Nordsjælland	36	17	8	11	76	58	+18	59	Qualification for the Europa League first qualifying round	1–2	3–4	—	0–0	3–1	2–1
4	Copenhagen (O)	36	17	7	12	65	47	+18	58	Qualification for the European play-off match	0–2	1–1	2–1	—	2–1	4–1
5	Aalborg	36	10	15	11	38	44	−6	45		3–3	0–3	0–0	1–0	—	2–0
6	Horsens	36	8	16	12	43	57	−14	40		0–1	2–2	2–2	2–3	2–1	—

Source: Danish FA
(C) Champions; (O) Play-off winners

===== Matches =====
2 April 2018 27	AaB	0 – 3	Brøndby IF	Aalborg
18:00 CEST	Okore (red card) 90+3'	Report	Larsson 21'; Wilczek 35'; Pukki 41'	Stadium: Aalborg Portland Park; Attendance: 7,595; Referee: Michael Tykgaard

6 April 2018 28	FC Nordsjælland	3 – 1	AaB	Farum
19:00 CEST	Mikkelsen 20'; Jensen 28' (pen.); Rygaard 50'	Report	Pohl 8'	Stadium: Right to Dream Park; Attendance: 2,426; Referee: Jakob Kehlet

15 April 2018 29	AaB	2 – 0	AC Horsens	Aalborg
14:00 CEST	Blåbjerg 70'; Kusk 90+4'	Report		Stadium: Aalborg Portland Park; Attendance: 3,175; Referee: Peter Kjærsgaard

18 April 2018 30	FC København	2 – 1	AaB	Copenhagen
20:00 CEST	Wind 12'; Fischer 68'	Report	Blåbjerg 33'	Stadium: Telia Parken; Attendance: 9,789; Referee: Anders Poulsen

22 April 2018 31	AaB	3 – 3	FC Midtjylland	Aalborg
16:00 CEST	Lesniak 27'; Šafranko 34'; Abou Ali 77'	Report	Sanneh 19'; Poulsen 63'; Onyeka 90+2'	Stadium: Aalborg Portland Park; Attendance: 4,657; Referee: Jørgen Daugbjerg Burchardt

29 April 2018 32	FC Midtjylland	3 – 0	AaB	Herning
16:00 CEST	Poulsen 4'; Wikheim 15'; Duelund 83'	Report		Stadium: MCH Arena; Attendance: 7,695; Referee: Jens Grabski Maae

4 May 2018 33	AC Horsens	2 – 1	AaB	Horsens
19:00 CEST	Okosun 51'; Finnbogason 60' (pen.)	Report	Risgård 43' (pen.)	Stadium: Casa Arena Horsens; Attendance: 2,420; Referee: Morten Krogh

13 May 2018 34	AaB	1 – 0	FC København	Aalborg
20:00 CEST	Kusk 90+4'	Report		Stadium: Aalborg Portland Park; Attendance: 5,148; Referee: Michael Tykgaard

18 May 2018 35	AaB	0 – 0	FC Nordsjælland	Aalborg
18:00 CEST		Report		Stadium: Aalborg Portland Park; Attendance: 5,067; Referee: Morten Krogh

21 May 2018 36	Brøndby IF	1 – 1	AaB	Brøndbyvester
18:00 CEST	Röcker 88'	Report	Risgård 45'	Stadium: Brøndby Stadion; Attendance: 25,848; Referee: Mads-Kristoffer Kristoffersen

=== DBU Pokalen ===
7 September 2017 Second round	Viborg FF (2)	1 – 5 (a.e.t.)	AaB	Viborg
19:30 CEST	Kamper 7'	Report	Rolim 90+3'; Pohl 97'; Børsting 98'; Šafranko 105'; Risgård 109'; Sylvestr (penalty missed) 62'	Stadium: Energi Viborg Arena; Attendance: 2,515; Referee: Dennis Mogensen

20 September 2017 Third round	Middelfart Boldklub (3)	0 – 2	AaB	Middelfart
16:30 CEST		Report	Børsting 27', 58'	Stadium: Middelfart Stadion; Attendance: 1,121; Referee: Jørgen Daugbjerg Burchardt

6 December 2017 Fourth round	AaB	2 – 1	FC Helsingør (1)	Aalborg
17:45 CET	Rolim 90'; Flores 90+1'	Report	Okore 20' (o.g.)	Stadium: Aalborg Portland Park; Attendance: 3,082; Referee: Jakob Kehlet

11 April 2018 Quarter-final	FC Fredericia (2)	3 – 1	AaB	Fredericia
18:00 CEST	Høegh 15', 45+1'; Fazlagic 39'	Report	Børsting 59'	Stadium: Monjasa Park; Attendance: 2,466; Referee: Morten Krogh

== Statistics ==
=== Appearances ===
As of 21 May 2018

This includes all competitive matches. The list is sorted by shirt number when appearances are equal.

Rnk	Pos	No.	Player	Alka Superliga	DBU Pokalen	Total
1	FW	9	(Denmark) Jannik Pohl	32	4	36
1	MF	25	(Denmark) Frederik Børsting	32	4	36
3	DF	4	(Denmark) Jakob Blåbjerg	31	4	35
4	MF	23	(Slovakia) Filip Lesniak	31	3	34
5	GK	1	(Sweden) Jacob Rinne	29	4	33
6	MF	10	(Peru) Edison Flores	29	2	31
6	FW	14	(Slovakia) Pavol Šafranko	28	3	31
8	DF	3	(Denmark) Jakob Ahlmann	28	2	30
8	DF	5	(Denmark) Jores Okore	27	3	30
10	DF	32	(Denmark) Kasper Pedersen	27	2	29
11	MF	21	(Denmark) Kasper Risgård	25	2	27
12	DF	6	(Denmark) Kristoffer Pallesen	24	2	26
13	MF	8	(Denmark) Rasmus Würtz	22	1	23
15	MF	16	(Denmark) Magnus Christensen	20	2	22
15	MF	18	(Denmark) Rasmus Thellufsen	19	3	22
17	MF	28	(Brazil) Yann Rolim	17	4	21
18	MF	27	(Denmark) Oliver Abildgaard	17	2	19
19	MF	17	(Denmark) Kasper Kusk	17	1	18
20	MF	26	(Uganda) Robert Kakeeto	12	2	14
21	DF	2	(Denmark) Patrick Kristensen	10	3	13
22	FW	11	(Slovakia) Jakub Sylvestr	10	2	12
23	GK	1	(Denmark) Nicolai Larsen	7	0	7
24	FW	30	(Denmark) Wessam Abou Ali	6	0	6
25	MF	20	(Austria) Marco Meilinger	2	0	2
26	DF	20	(Denmark) Anders Bærtelsen	1	0	1
26	DF	24	(Denmark) Nikolaj Lyngø	1	0	1
26	DF	29	(Denmark) Lukas Klitten	0	1	1

=== Goalscorers ===
As of 21 May 2018

This includes all competitive matches. The list is sorted by shirt number when total goals are equal.

Rnk	Pos	No.	Player	Alka Superliga	DBU Pokalen	Total
1	FW	9	(Denmark) Jannik Pohl	8	1	9
2	MF	25	(Denmark) Frederik Børsting	3	4	7
3	DF	4	(Denmark) Jakob Blåbjerg	5	0	5
4	MF	21	(Denmark) Kasper Risgård	3	1	4
4	MF	28	(Brazil) Yann Rolim	2	2	4
6	FW	14	(Slovakia) Pavol Šafranko	2	1	3
6	MF	17	(Denmark) Kasper Kusk	3	0	3
8	DF	5	(Denmark) Jores Okore	2	0	2
8	MF	10	(Peru) Edison Flores	1	1	2
8	MF	23	(Slovakia) Filip Lesniak	2	0	2
8	DF	32	(Denmark) Kasper Pedersen	2	0	2
12	DF	3	(Denmark) Jakob Ahlmann	1	0	1
12	MF	16	(Denmark) Magnus Christensen	1	0	1
12	MF	18	(Denmark) Rasmus Thellufsen	1	0	1
12	FW	30	(Denmark) Wessam Abou Ali	1	0	1
—	Own goals			1	0	1
TOTALS				38	10	48

=== Clean sheets ===
As of 21 May 2018

This includes all competitive matches. The list is sorted by shirt number when total clean sheets are equal.

Rnk	Pos	No.	Player	Alka Superliga	DBU Pokalen	Total
1	GK	1	(Sweden) Jacob Rinne	10	1	11
2	GK	1	(Denmark) Nicolai Larsen	3	0	3
TOTALS				13	1	14

=== Disciplinary record ===
As of 21 May 2018

This includes all competitive matches. The list is sorted by shirt number when total cards are equal.

Rnk	Pos.	No.	Player	Alka Superliga		DBU Pokalen		Total	
Rnk	Pos.	No.	Player	Booked	Sent off (straight red)	Booked	Sent off (straight red)	Booked	Sent off (straight red)
1	MF	16	(Denmark) Magnus Christensen	5	1	1	0	6	1
2	DF	5	(Denmark) Jores Okore	3	1	1	0	4	1
3	DF	3	(Denmark) Jakob Ahlmann	9	0	0	0	9	0
4	MF	8	(Denmark) Rasmus Würtz	5	0	1	0	6	0
5	DF	6	(Denmark) Kristoffer Pallesen	4	0	1	0	5	0
5	MF	25	(Denmark) Frederik Børsting	5	0	0	0	5	0
5	MF	27	(Denmark) Oliver Abildgaard	4	0	1	0	5	0
8	DF	4	(Denmark) Jakob Blåbjerg	2	0	1	0	3	0
8	FW	9	(Denmark) Jannik Pohl	3	0	0	0	3	0
8	FW	14	(Slovakia) Pavol Šafranko	3	0	0	0	3	0
8	MF	21	(Denmark) Kasper Risgård	3	0	0	0	3	0
8	MF	23	(Slovakia) Filip Lesniak	3	0	0	0	3	0
8	DF	32	(Denmark) Kasper Pedersen	3	0	0	0	3	0
14	GK	1	(Sweden) Jacob Rinne	1	0	0	0	1	0
14	DF	2	(Denmark) Patrick Kristensen	1	0	0	0	1	0
14	MF	10	(Peru) Edison Flores	1	0	0	0	1	0
14	MF	17	(Denmark) Kasper Kusk	1	0	0	0	1	0
14	DF	24	(Denmark) Nikolaj Lyngø	1	0	0	0	1	0
14	FW	30	(Denmark) Wessam Abou Ali	1	0	0	0	1	0
TOTALS				58	2	6	0	64	2

=== Suspensions ===
As of 21 May 2018

This includes all competitive matches. The list is sorted by shirt number when total matches suspended are equal.

Rnk	Pos	No.	Player	Alka Superliga	DBU Pokalen	Total
1	DF	5	(Denmark) Jores Okore	5	0	5
2	DF	3	(Denmark) Jakob Ahlmann	2	0	2
2	MF	16	(Denmark) Magnus Christensen	2	0	2
2	DF	24	(Denmark) Nikolaj Lyngø	2	0	2
5	MF	8	(Denmark) Rasmus Würtz	1	0	1
5	MF	25	(Denmark) Frederik Børsting	1	0	1
TOTALS				13	0	13

== Awards ==
=== Team ===
Award	Month	Source

=== Individual ===
No.	Player	Award	Month	Source
