= 2018–19 AaB Fodbold season =

AaB
2018–19 season
- Sports director: Allan Gaarde
- Head coach: Morten Wieghorst (until 26 November 2018); Jacob Friis (from 26 November 2018)
- Stadium: Aalborg Portland Park
- Superliga: 9th
- Sydbank Pokalen: Semifinal
- Top goalscorer: League: Lucas Andersen (10); All: Tom van Weert (11)
- Highest home attendance: 8,629 vs Brøndby IF (9 August 2018, Superliga)
- Lowest home attendance: 1,774 vs AC Horsens (31 October 2018, Sydbank Pokalen)
- Average home league attendance: 5,663
Home colours	Away colours	Third colours

The 2018–19 season was AaB's 36th consecutive season in the top flight of Danish football, 29th consecutive season in the Danish Superliga, and 133rd year in existence as a football club.

== Club ==
=== Coaching staff ===
Position	Staff
Head coach	(Denmark) Morten Wieghorst (sacked on 26 November 2018) (Denmark) Jacob Friis (from 26 November 2018)
Assistant coaches	(Denmark) Jacob Friis (until 26 November 2018) (Denmark) Thomas Augustinussen (until 31 December 2018) (Denmark) Allan K. Jepsen (from 1 January 2019) (Denmark) Lasse Stensgaard (from 1 January 2019)
Development manager	(Denmark) Poul Erik Andreasen
Goalkeeping coach	(Denmark) Poul Buus
Analyst	(Denmark) Jim Holm Larsen
Team Leader	(Denmark) Ernst Damborg
Doctor	(Denmark) Søren Kaalund
Physiotherapist	(Denmark) Morten Skjoldager
Physical trainer	(England) Ashley Tootle
U/19 League coach	(Denmark) Lasse Stensgaard (until 31 December 2018) (Denmark) David Olsen (from 1 January 2019)
U/17 League coach	(Denmark) David Olsen (until 31 December 2018) (Denmark) Nikolaj Hørby (from 1 January 2019)

Source: AaB Fodbold

=== Other information ===
Owner	(Denmark) AaB A/S
Chief executive	(Denmark) Thomas Bælum
Sports director	(Denmark) Allan Gaarde
Sales manager	(Denmark) Lotte Hedegaard
Head of press and communications	(Denmark) Brian Andersen
Head of experience	(Denmark) Martin Stigaard Skammelsen
Ground (capacity and dimensions)	Nordjyske Arena (13,997 / 105x70 metres)
Training ground	AaB Training Ground

Source: AaB Fodbold

== Squad ==
=== First team squad ===
This squad list includes any first team squad player who was available for the line-up during the season.

No.	Pos.	Nation	Player
1	GK	(Sweden) SWE	Jacob Rinne
2	DF	(Denmark) DEN	Patrick Kristensen
3	DF	(Denmark) DEN	Jakob Ahlmann
4	DF	(Denmark) DEN	Jakob Blåbjerg
5	DF	(Denmark) DEN	Jores Okore
6	DF	(Denmark) DEN	Kristoffer Pallesen
7	MF	(Denmark) DEN	Oliver Abildgaard
8	MF	(Denmark) DEN	Rasmus Würtz (captain)
9	FW	(Denmark) DEN	Jannik Pohl (until 29 August 2018)
9	FW	(Netherlands) NED	Tom van Weert (from 29 August 2018)
10	MF	(Peru) PER	Edison Flores (until 28 August 2018)
10	MF	(Denmark) DEN	Lucas Andersen (from 30 August 2018)
11	FW	(Germany) GER	Philipp Ochs (from 9 August 2018)
14	FW	(Slovakia) SVK	Pavol Šafranko (until 10 August 2018)

No.	Pos.	Nation	Player
16	MF	(Denmark) DEN	Magnus Christensen
17	MF	(Denmark) DEN	Kasper Kusk
18	MF	(Denmark) DEN	Rasmus Thellufsen
19	FW	(Denmark) DEN	Marco Ramkilde
21	MF	(Denmark) DEN	Kasper Risgård (vice-captain)
22	GK	(United States) USA	Michael Lansing
23	MF	(Slovakia) SVK	Filip Lesniak
24	DF	(Denmark) DEN	Nikolaj Lyngø (until 3 August 2018)
24	DF	(Denmark) DEN	Mathias Ross (from 9 October 2018)
25	MF	(Denmark) DEN	Frederik Børsting
26	MF	(Uganda) UGA	Robert Kakeeto (until 31 August 2018, from 1 January 2019)
30	FW	(Denmark) DEN	Wessam Abou Ali
32	DF	(Denmark) DEN	Kasper Pedersen
33	DF	(Albania) ALB	Bardhec Bytyqi (until 24 January 2019)

Source: AaB Fodbold website

=== Youth players in use ===
This list includes any youth player from AaB Academy who was used in the season.

No.	Pos.	Nation	Player
15	DF	(Denmark) DEN	Lukas Klitten (from AaB U19)
20	MF	(Denmark) DEN	Oliver Klitten (from AaB U19)
24	DF	(Denmark) DEN	Mathias Ross (from AaB U19, promoted to first team squad on 9 October 2018)
29	FW	(Denmark) DEN	Mikkel Kaufmann (from AaB U19)

== Transfers and loans ==
=== In ===
==== Summer ====
Squad #	Position	Player	Transferred from	Date	Source
9	DF	(Netherlands) Tom van Weert	(Netherlands) FC Groningen	29 August 2018	
24	FW	(Denmark) Mathias Ross	(Denmark) AaB Academy	9 October 2018	

==== Winter ====
Squad #	Position	Player	Transferred from	Date	Source

=== Out ===
==== Summer ====
Squad #	Position	Player	Transferred to	Date	Source
31	DF	(Denmark) Mathias Andersen	(Denmark) Vejgaard BK	1 July 2018	
10	MF	(Peru) Edison Flores	(Mexico) Monarcas Morelia	28 August 2018	
9	FW	(Denmark) Jannik Pohl	(Netherlands) FC Groningen	29 August 2018	

==== Winter ====
Squad #	Position	Player	Transferred to	Date	Source
24	DF	(Denmark) Nikolaj Lyngø	(United States) Hartford Athletic	1 January 2019	

=== Loan in ===
Squad #	Position	Player	Loaned from	Start	End	Source
11	FW	(Germany) Philipp Ochs	(Germany) TSG 1899 Hoffenheim	9 August 2018	30 June 2019	
10	FW	(Denmark) Lucas Andersen	(Switzerland) Grasshoppers	30 August 2018	30 June 2019	

=== Loan out ===
Squad #	Position	Player	Loaned to	Start	End	Source
24	DF	(Denmark) Nikolaj Lyngø	(Denmark) Jammerbugt FC	3 August 2018	31 December 2018	
14	FW	(Slovakia) Pavol Šafranko	(Scotland) Dundee United	10 August 2018	30 June 2019	
26	MF	(Uganda) Robert Kakeeto	(Denmark) Jammerbugt FC	31 August 2018	31 December 2018	
33	DF	(Albania) Bardhec Bytyqi	(Denmark) Jammerbugt FC	24 January 2019	30 June 2019	

== Friendlies ==
=== Pre-season ===
23 June 2018 Friendly	AaB	2 – 3	(Denmark) Viborg FF	Aalborg, Denmark
14:00 CEST	Šafranko 16'; Kaufmann 75'	Report	Sivebæk 14'; Albers 48'; Mourier 68'	Stadium: Aalborg Portland Park

25 June 2018 Friendly	Hobro IK (Denmark)	1 – 1	AaB	Als, Denmark
14:00 CEST	Babayan 90'	Report	Kusk 58'	Stadium: Als Stadion

30 June 2018 Friendly	AaB	2 – 1	(Denmark) Randers FC	Farsø, Denmark
14:00 CEST	Pohl 22'; Šafranko 35'	Report	Riis 68'	Stadium: Farsø Stadion

7 July 2018 Friendly	AaB	1 – 2	(Denmark) Silkeborg IF	Aalborg, Denmark
14:00 CEST	Bytyqi 50'	Report	Jakobsen 33'; Skhirtladze 49'	Stadium: Aalborg Portland Park

=== Mid-season ===
12 January 2019 Friendly	AaB	1 – 2	(Denmark) Hobro IK	Aalborg, Denmark
12:00 CET	Kusk 6' (pen.)	Report	Hammershøy-Mistrati 9'; Kristoffersen 35'	Stadium: AaB Training Ground

15 January 2019 Friendly	AaB	6 – 0	(Denmark) Thisted FC	Aalborg, Denmark
15:00 CET	van Weert 12'; Højholt 18'; Andersen 44'; Abou Ali 69' (pen.), 75', 89'	Report		Stadium: AaB Training Ground

25 January 2019 Friendly	FC Desna Chernihiv (Ukraine)	0 – 1	AaB	Belek, Turkey
17:00 TRT		Report	Pedersen 4'	Stadium: Papillon Fotbol Center

29 January 2019 Friendly	AaB	2 – 2	(Poland) Śląsk Wrocław	Belek, Turkey
12:00 TRT	van Weert 72' (pen.), 80'	Report	Radecki 27'; Ahmadzadeh 84'	Stadium: Papillon Fotbol Center

2 February 2019 Friendly	AaB	5 – 3	(Denmark) Vejle Boldklub	Aalborg, Denmark
14:00 CET	van Weert 16', 59'; Blåbjerg 25'; Pedersen 45'; Andersen 63'	Report	Nilsson 6'; Mucolli 23'; Jakobsen 63'	Stadium: AaB Training Ground; Referee: Mikkel Redder

22 March 2019 Friendly	AaB	0 – 2	(Norway) Odds BK	Aalborg, Denmark
15:00 CET		Report	Rashani 47'; Kaasa 84'	Stadium: AaB Training Ground

== Competitions ==
=== Competition record ===
Competition	Record							
Competition	G	W	D	L	GF	GA	GD	Win %
Superliga	34	10	12	12	44	44	+0	29.41
Sydbank Pokalen	4	3	0	1	9	2	+7	75.00
Total	38	13	12	13	53	46	+7	34.21

=== Superliga ===
==== Results summary ====
Overall								Home						Away					
Pld	W	D	L	GF	GA	GD	Pts	W	D	L	GF	GA	GD	W	D	L	GF	GA	GD
34	10	12	12	44	44	0	42	4	5	8	18	23	−5	6	7	4	26	21	+5

Last updated: 12 May 2019.
Source: Competitive matches

==== Regular season ====
Pos	Team	Pld	W	D	L	GF	GA	GD	Pts	Qualification
5	Esbjerg	26	11	5	10	32	35	−3	38	Qualification for the Championship round
6	Nordsjælland	26	9	9	8	42	39	+3	36	Qualification for the Championship round
7	AaB	26	9	9	8	38	35	+3	36	Qualification for the Relegation round
8	Randers	26	9	7	10	29	34	−5	34	Qualification for the Relegation round
9	AGF	26	7	10	9	31	34	−3	31	Qualification for the Relegation round

Source: Danish Football Association (in Danish), Soccerway
Rules for classification: 1) Points; 2) Goal difference; 3) Goals scored; 4) Away goals scored; 5) Play-off (played on neutral ground if determining teams for different rounds); 6) Draw.

===== Matches =====
13 July 2018 1	SønderjyskE	0 – 1	AaB	Haderslev
20:15 CEST		Report	Kusk 79'	Stadium: Sydbank Park; Attendance: 5,122; Referee: Jens Grabski Maae

20 July 2018 2	AaB	2 – 1	FC Midtjylland	Aalborg
19:00 CEST	Thellufsen 52'; Pohl 86'	Report	Onuachu 42'	Stadium: Aalborg Portland Park; Attendance: 6,422; Referee: Mads-Kristoffer Kristoffersen

29 July 2018 3	FC København	4 – 0	AaB	Copenhagen
18:00 CEST	N'Doye 6', 15', 22'; Fischer 90+2'	Report		Stadium: Telia Parken; Attendance: 12,012; Referee: Michael Tykgaard

6 August 2018 4	Vendsyssel FF	0 – 1	AaB	Hjørring
19:00 CEST	Christensen (red card) 90+4'	Report	Risgård 79'	Stadium: Nord Energi Arena; Attendance: 6,415; Referee: Sandi Putros

12 August 2018 5	AaB	1 – 0	FC Nordsjælland	Aalborg
14:00 CEST	Ochs 90'; Ochs (red card) 90+4'	Report		Stadium: Aalborg Portland Park; Attendance: 5,145; Referee: Jakob Kehlet

20 August 2018 6	AC Horsens	0 – 0	AaB	Horsens
19:00 CEST		Report		Stadium: Casa Arena Horsens; Attendance: 3,023; Referee: Mads-Kristoffer Kristoffersen

27 August 2018 7	AaB	0 – 1	Esbjerg fB	Aalborg
19:00 CEST		Report	Kauko 57'	Stadium: Aalborg Portland Park; Attendance: 5,001; Referee: Michael Tykgaard

2 September 2018 8	Randers FC	2 – 2	AaB	Randers
14:00 CEST	Rømer 17'; Lobzhanidze 19'	Report	Thellufsen 11'; Abildgaard 68'	Stadium: Randers Stadion; Attendance: 4,506; Referee: Jens Grabski Maae

17 September 2018 9	AaB	1 – 1	Vejle Boldklub	Aalborg
19:00 CEST	Thellufsen 11'	Report	Greve 51'	Stadium: Aalborg Portland Park; Attendance: 5,716; Referee: Benjamin Willaume-Jantzen

23 September 2018 10	Hobro IK	0 – 5	AaB	Hobro
14:00 CEST		Report	Pedersen 31' van Weert 45', 66'; Olsen 59' (o.g.); Andersen 69'	Stadium: DS Arena; Attendance: 3,426; Referee: Jakob Kehlet

30 September 2018 11	AaB	0 – 1	OB	Aalborg
16:00 CEST		Report	Nielsen 18'	Stadium: Aalborg Portland Park; Attendance: 5,739; Referee: Peter Kjærsgaard

7 October 2018 12	AaB	1 – 3	Brøndby IF	Aalborg
18:00 CEST	Risgård 77' (pen.)	Report	Wilczek 45+2'; Mukhtar 47'; Vigen 67'	Stadium: Aalborg Portland Park; Attendance: 8,629; Referee: Jakob Kehlet

21 October 2018 13	AGF	2 – 2	AaB	Aarhus
14:00 CEST	Sana (penalty missed) 33'; Ankersen 39'; Spelmann 75'	Report	Okore (red card) 31'; Christensen 62'; Abou Ali 85'	Stadium: Ceres Park; Attendance: 9,535; Referee: Mads-Kristoffer Kristoffersen

28 October 2018 14	AaB	0 – 1	Vendsyssel FF	Aalborg
18:00 CET		Report	Henriksen 62'	Stadium: Aalborg Portland Park; Attendance: 6,071; Referee: Jakob Kehlet

4 November 2018 15	FC Nordsjælland	1 – 1	AaB	Farum
14:30 CET	Donyoh 84'; Skovgaard (red card) 90+6'	Report	Skovgaard 23' (o.g.)	Stadium: Right to Dream Park; Attendance: 2,634; Referee: Jørgen Daugbjerg Burchardt

11 November 2018 16	AaB	1 – 1	FC København	Aalborg
16:00 CET	Andersen 58'	Report	N'Doye 83'	Stadium: Aalborg Portland Park; Attendance: 6,947; Referee: Michael Tykgaard

23 November 2018 17	Vejle Boldklub	1 – 1	AaB	Vejle
19:00 CET	Mucolli 82'	Report	van Weert 62'	Stadium: Vejle Stadion; Attendance: 3,736; Referee: Michael Johansen

30 November 2018 18	Esbjerg fB	1 – 4	AaB	Esbjerg
19:00 CET	Kauko 83'	Report	Andersen 43', 45+1'; Thellufsen 53'; Kusk 55'	Stadium: Blue Water Arena; Attendance: 2,862; Referee: Mads-Kristoffer Kristoffersen

9 December 2018 19	AaB	2 – 4	AC Horsens	Aalborg
14:00 CET	van Weert 13'; Kusk 33'; Okore (red card) 45'	Report	Junker 25'; Drost 28' (pen.); Lumb 61'; Kryger 89'	Stadium: Aalborg Portland Park; Attendance: 4,656; Referee: Sandi Putros

14 December 2018 20	OB	1 – 2	AaB	Odense
19:00 CET	Helenius 45+4' (pen.)	Report	van Weert (penalty missed) 9'; Kusk 57'; Pedersen 80'	Stadium: Nature Energy Park; Attendance: 4,404; Referee: Michael Johansen

10 February 2019 21	AaB	0 – 3	Randers FC	Aalborg
14:00 CET		Report	Kallesøe 57', 71'; Lobzhanidze 64'	Stadium: Aalborg Portland Park; Attendance: 4,724; Referee: Jørgen Daugbjerg Burchardt

18 February 2019 22	FC Midtjylland	2 – 1	AaB	Herning
19:00 CET	Onuachu 45'; Evander 51'	Report	van Weert 57'	Stadium: MCH Arena; Attendance: 7,442; Referee: Jakob Kehlet

22 February 2019 23	AaB	3 – 0	SønderjyskE	Aalborg
19:00 CET	van Weert 27' (pen.); Andersen 44'; Pedersen 78'	Report		Stadium: Aalborg Portland Park; Attendance: 3,839; Referee: Sandi Putros

1 March 2019 24	AaB	1 – 1	Hobro IK	Aalborg
19:00 CET	Andersen 71'	Report	Kirkevold 35'	Stadium: Aalborg Portland Park; Attendance: 6,346; Referee: Jens Grabski Maae

10 March 2019 25	Brøndby IF	3 – 3	AaB	Brøndbyvester
18:00 CET	Wilczek 28' (pen.), 46'; Erceg 60'	https://aabsport.dk/nyheder/2019/marts/spaendende-og-maalrig-remis-i-broendby/ [Report]	Kusk 5' van Weert 28'; Andersen 63'	Stadium: Brøndby Stadion; Attendance: 14,152; Referee: Peter Kjærsgaard

17 March 2019 26	AaB	3 – 1	AGF	Aalborg
17:00 CET	Pedersen 38'; Kristensen 59'; Andersen 80'	Report	Ankersen 42'; Hvidt (red card) 60'	Stadium: Aalborg Portland Park; Attendance: 6,821; Referee: Mads-Kristoffer Kristoffersen

==== Relegation round ====
Points and goals will carry over in full from the regular season.

Pos	Team	Pld	W	D	L	GF	GA	GD	Pts	Qualification or relegation	RAN	AAB	VEN	HOB
1	Randers	32	12	9	11	35	39	−4	45	Qualification for the European play-off quarter-finals	—	0–2	1–1	1–0
2	AaB	32	10	12	10	44	41	+3	42	Qualification for the European play-off quarter-finals	1–2	—	1–1	1–1
3	Vendsyssel (R)	32	6	11	15	32	49	−17	29	Qualification for the relegation play-offs	0–0	1–0	—	3–3
4	Hobro (O)	32	6	9	17	31	55	−24	27	Qualification for the relegation play-offs	1–2	1–1	3–2	—

Source: Soccerway
Rules for classification: 1) Points; 2) Goal difference; 3) Goals scored; 4) Away goals scored; 5) Play-off.
(O) Play-off winners; (R) Relegated

===== Matches =====
31 March 2019 27	AaB	1 – 2	Randers FC	Aalborg
14:00 CEST	Børsting 3'	Report	Lobzhanidze 46'; Pedersen 54' (o.g.); Conboy (red card) 90+2'	Stadium: Aalborg Portland Park; Attendance: 3,767; Referee: Mikkel Redder

7 April 2019 28	Hobro IK	1 – 1	AaB	Hobro
12:00 CEST	Kirkevold 20'	Report	Kaufmann 90+5'	Stadium: DS Arena; Attendance: 2,634; Referee: Peter Munch Larsen

13 April 2019 29	Vendsyssel FF	1 – 0	AaB	Hjørring
16:00 CEST	Kamara 40'	Report	Kusk (penalty missed) 28'	Stadium: Nord Energi Arena; Attendance: 3,088; Referee: Michael Tykgaard

17 April 2019 30	AaB	1 – 1	Vendsyssel FF	Aalborg
18:00 CEST	Andersen 9'	Report	Kristensen 29' (o.g.)	Stadium: Aalborg Portland Park; Attendance: 5,042; Referee: Jakob Kehlet

22 April 2019 31	Randers FC	0 – 2	AaB	Randers
14:00 CEST		Report	van Weert 2'; Andersen 69'	Stadium: Cepheus Park Randers; Attendance: 3,908; Referee: Benjamin Willaume-Jantzen

26 April 2019 32	AaB	1 – 1	Hobro IK	Aalborg
19:30 CEST	Risgård 46'	Report	Kirkevold 80'	Stadium: Aalborg Portland Park; Attendance: 5,075; Referee: Anders Poulsen

==== European play-offs ====
===== Quarter-finals =====
5 May 33 (first leg)	AaB	0 – 1	AGF	Aalborg
12:00 CEST		Report	Ankersen 44'	Stadium: Aalborg Portland Park; Attendance: 6,326; Referee: Michael Tykgaard

12 May 34 (second leg)	AGF	2 – 0 (3 – 0 agg.)	AaB	Aarhus
18:00 CEST	Blume 37'; Ammitzbøll 86'	Report		Stadium: Ceres Park; Attendance: 10,118; Referee: Peter Kjærsgaard

=== Sydbank Pokalen ===
26 September 2018 Third round	FC Roskilde (2)	0 – 5	AaB	Roskilde
18:30 CEST		Report	Abou Ali 8', 88'; McLagan 15' (o.g.); Risgård 57', 70'	Stadium: Roskilde Idrætspark; Attendance: 992; Referee: Peter Kjærsgaard

31 October 2018 Fourth round	AaB	1 – 0	AC Horsens (1)	Aalborg
19:00 CET	van Weert 62'	Report		Stadium: Aalborg Portland Park; Attendance: 1,774; Referee: Peter Kjærsgaard

14 March 2019 Quarterfinal	Næstved BK (2)	1 – 3	AaB	Næstved
18:00 CET	Munksgaard 40'	Report	van Weert 7', 19'; Christensen 52'	Stadium: ProfaGroup Park; Attendance: 2,214; Referee: Mads-Kristoffer Kristoffersen

4 April 2019 Semifinal	Brøndby IF (1)	1 – 0	AaB	Brøndbyvester
19:30 CEST	Wilczek 13'; Erceg (red card) 90+4'	Report		Stadium: Brøndby Stadion; Attendance: 13,361; Referee: Jens Grabski Maae

== Statistics ==
=== Appearances ===
As of 12 May 2019

This includes all competitive matches. The list is sorted by shirt number when appearances are equal.

Rnk	Pos	No.	Player	Superliga	Sydbank Pokalen	Total
1	GK	1	(Sweden) Jacob Rinne	34	2	36
1	MF	17	(Denmark) Kasper Kusk	33	3	36
3	MF	18	(Denmark) Rasmus Thellufsen	31	4	35
4	DF	5	(Denmark) Jores Okore	31	2	33
5	MF	21	(Denmark) Kasper Risgård	29	3	32
6	MF	16	(Denmark) Magnus Christensen	27	2	29
7	FW	9	(Netherlands) Tom van Weert	25	3	28
8	DF	3	(Denmark) Jakob Ahlmann	25	2	27
8	MF	10	(Denmark) Lucas Andersen	23	4	27
8	MF	7	(Denmark) Oliver Abildgaard	25	2	27
11	DF	32	(Denmark) Kasper Pedersen	22	4	26
12	MF	25	(Denmark) Frederik Børsting	23	2	25
13	FW	11	(Germany) Philipp Ochs	20	4	24
14	FW	30	(Denmark) Wessam Abou Ali	22	1	23
15	DF	6	(Denmark) Kristoffer Pallesen	18	3	21
15	MF	8	(Denmark) Rasmus Würtz	18	3	21
17	DF	4	(Denmark) Jakob Blåbjerg	14	3	17
18	DF	2	(Denmark) Patrick Kristensen	14	1	15
19	MF	23	(Slovakia) Filip Lesniak	8	2	10
19	DF	24	(Denmark) Mathias Ross	9	1	10
21	FW	29	(Denmark) Mikkel Kaufmann	8	1	9
22	FW	9	(Denmark) Jannik Pohl	6	0	6
23	DF	15	(Denmark) Lukas Klitten	3	0	3
23	MF	20	(Denmark) Oliver Klitten	2	1	3
25	FW	14	(Slovakia) Pavol Šafranko	2	0	2
25	GK	22	(United States) Michael Lansing	0	2	2
25	DF	33	(Albania) Bardhec Bytyqi	1	1	2
28	MF	26	(Uganda) Robert Kakeeto	1	0	1

=== Goalscorers ===
As of 12 May 2019

This includes all competitive matches. The list is sorted by shirt number when total goals are equal.

Rnk	Pos	No.	Player	Superliga	Sydbank Pokalen	Total
1	FW	9	(Netherlands) Tom van Weert	8	3	11
2	MF	10	(Denmark) Lucas Andersen	10	0	10
3	MF	17	(Denmark) Kasper Kusk	5	0	5
3	MF	21	(Denmark) Kasper Risgård	3	2	5
5	MF	18	(Denmark) Rasmus Thellufsen	4	0	4
5	DF	32	(Denmark) Kasper Pedersen	4	0	4
7	FW	30	(Denmark) Wessam Abou Ali	1	2	3
8	MF	16	(Denmark) Magnus Christensen	1	1	2
9	DF	2	(Denmark) Patrick Kristensen	1	0	1
9	MF	7	(Denmark) Oliver Abildgaard	1	0	1
9	FW	9	(Denmark) Jannik Pohl	1	0	1
9	FW	11	(Germany) Philipp Ochs	1	0	1
9	MF	25	(Denmark) Frederik Børsting	1	0	1
9	FW	29	(Denmark) Mikkel Kaufmann	1	0	1
—	Own goals			2	1	3
TOTALS				44	9	53

=== Assists ===
As of 12 May 2018

This includes all competitive matches. The list is sorted by shirt number when total assists are equal.

Rnk	Pos	No.	Player	Superliga	Sydbank Pokalen	Total
1	MF	17	(Denmark) Kasper Kusk	8	2	10
2	MF	18	(Denmark) Rasmus Thellufsen	3	1	4
3	MF	10	(Denmark) Lucas Andersen	2	1	3
4	DF	3	(Denmark) Jakob Ahlmann	2	0	2
4	MF	25	(Denmark) Frederik Børsting	2	0	2
4	FW	30	(Denmark) Wessam Abou Ali	2	0	2
7	DF	6	(Denmark) Kristoffer Pallesen	0	1	1
7	MF	8	(Denmark) Rasmus Würtz	0	1	1
7	FW	9	(Denmark) Jannik Pohl	1	0	1
7	FW	9	(Netherlands) Tom van Weert	1	0	1
7	FW	11	(Germany) Philipp Ochs	1	0	1
7	DF	15	(Denmark) Lukas Klitten	1	0	1
7	MF	16	(Denmark) Magnus Christensen	1	0	1
7	MF	23	(Slovakia) Filip Lesniak	0	1	1
7	DF	32	(Denmark) Kasper Pedersen	1	0	1
TOTALS				25	7	32

=== Clean sheets ===
As of 12 May 2018

This includes all competitive matches. The list is sorted by shirt number when total clean sheets are equal.

Rnk	Pos	No.	Player	Superliga	Sydbank Pokalen	Total
1	GK	1	(Sweden) Jacob Rinne	7	0	7
2	GK	22	(United States) Michael Lansing	0	2	2
TOTALS				7	2	9

=== Disciplinary record ===
As of 12 May 2018

This includes all competitive matches. The list is sorted by shirt number when total cards are equal.

Rnk	Pos.	No.	Player	Superliga		Sydbank Pokalen		Total	
Rnk	Pos.	No.	Player	Booked	Sent off (straight red)	Booked	Sent off (straight red)	Booked	Sent off (straight red)
1	DF	5	(Denmark) Jores Okore^{1}	4	2	0	0	4	2
2	FW	11	(Germany) Philipp Ochs	2	1	0	0	2	1
3	MF	7	(Denmark) Oliver Abildgaard	9	0	0	0	9	0
3	MF	25	(Denmark) Frederik Børsting	8	0	1	0	9	0
5	MF	10	(Denmark) Lucas Andersen	7	0	0	0	7	0
6	DF	3	(Denmark) Jakob Ahlmann	5	0	0	0	5	0
7	FW	9	(Netherlands) Tom van Weert	1	0	3	0	4	0
7	MF	16	(Denmark) Magnus Christensen	4	0	0	0	4	0
7	MF	18	(Denmark) Rasmus Thellufsen	4	0	0	0	4	0
10	MF	8	(Denmark) Rasmus Würtz	3	0	0	0	3	0
10	MF	17	(Denmark) Kasper Kusk	3	0	0	0	3	0
10	MF	21	(Denmark) Kasper Risgård	3	0	0	0	3	0
13	DF	4	(Denmark) Jakob Blåbjerg	2	0	0	0	2	0
13	DF	24	(Denmark) Mathias Ross	2	0	0	0	2	0
13	FW	30	(Denmark) Wessam Abou Ali	1	0	1	0	2	0
13	DF	32	(Denmark) Kasper Pedersen	2	0	0	0	2	0
17	GK	1	(Sweden) Jacob Rinne	1	0	0	0	1	0
17	DF	6	(Denmark) Kristoffer Pallesen	1	0	0	0	1	0
17	MF	23	(Slovakia) Filip Lesniak	1	0	0	0	1	0
17	FW	29	(Denmark) Mikkel Kaufmann	1	0	0	0	1	0
TOTALS				64	3	5	0	67	3

Notes

- Note 1: Jores Okore was sent off against AGF on 21 October 2018. However, the referee and the Superliga Disciplinary Board later withdrew the red card, leaving Okore not being suspended for the upcoming matches. In this statistic, though, the red is still counted in.

=== Suspensions ===
As of 12 May 2018

This includes all competitive matches. The list is sorted by shirt number when total matches suspended are equal.

Rnk	Pos	No.	Player	Superliga	Sydbank Pokalen	Total
1	DF	5	(Denmark) Jores Okore	2	0	2
1	MF	7	(Denmark) Oliver Abildgaard	2	0	2
1	MF	25	(Denmark) Frederik Børsting	2	0	2
4	DF	3	(Denmark) Jakob Ahlmann	1	0	1
4	MF	10	(Denmark) Lucas Andersen	1	0	1
4	FW	11	(Germany) Philipp Ochs	1	0	1
4	MF	16	(Denmark) Magnus Christensen	1	0	1
4	MF	26	(Uganda) Robert Kakeeto	1	0	1
TOTALS				11	0	11

== Awards ==
=== Team ===
Award	Month	Source

=== Individual ===
No.	Player	Award	Month	Source
