= 2015–16 AaB Fodbold season =

AaB
2015–16 season
- Sports Director: Allan Gaarde
- Head Coach: Lars Søndergaard
- Stadium: Nordjyske Arena
- Danish Superliga: 5th
- Danish Cup: Semi-final
- Top goalscorer: League: Lukas Spalvis (18); All: Lukas Spalvis (19)
- Highest home attendance: 9,420 vs Brøndby (1 May 2016, Danish Superliga)
- Lowest home attendance: 3,407 vs Lystrup IF (30 September 2015, Danish Cup)
- Average home league attendance: 7,124
Home colours	Away colours

The 2015–16 season is AaB's 33rd consecutive season in the top flight of Danish football, 26th consecutive season in the Danish Superliga, and 130th year in existence as a football club.

== Club ==
=== Coaching staff ===
Position	Staff
Head Coach	(Denmark) Lars Søndergaard
Assistant coach	(Denmark) Allan Kuhn (until 15 January 2016) (Denmark) Jacob Friis (from 11 January 2016)
Development Manager – AaB Fodbold	(Denmark) Poul Erik Andreasen
Goalkeeping coach	(Denmark) Poul Buus
Team Leader	(Denmark) Ernst Damborg
Doctor	(Denmark) Søren Kaalund
Physiotherapist	(Denmark) Morten Skjoldager
Physical trainer	(Denmark) Morten Randers Thomsen
Sports Psychology consultant	(Denmark) Martin Langagergaard
U/19 League coach	(Denmark) Jacob Friis (until 11 January 2016) (Denmark) Anders Damgaard (from 18 January 2016)
U/17 League coach	(Denmark) Adam Harell

Source: AaB Fodbold

=== Other information ===
Owner	(Denmark) AaB A/S
Chief Executive	(Denmark) Stephan Schors
Sports Director	(Denmark) Allan Gaarde
Sales Manager	(Denmark) Lars Glinvad
Press and Communications	(Denmark) Brian Andersen
Conference Sales Manager	(Denmark) Birgitte Cassebaum Nielsen
Ground (capacity and dimensions)	Nordjyske Arena (13,800 / 105x70 metres)
Training ground	AaB Training Centre

Source: AaB Fodbold

== First team squad ==
As of 14 August 2015

Squad No.	Name	Nationality	Position(s)	Since	Date of birth (age)	Signed from	Games played	Goals scored
Goalkeepers
1	Nicolai Larsen	(Denmark)	GK	2010	9 March 1991 (age 34)	(Denmark) Lyngby Boldklub	140	0
22	Carsten Christensen	(Denmark)	GK	2011	28 August 1986 (age 39)	(Denmark) FC Fredericia	6	0
Defenders
3	Jakob Ahlmann	(Denmark)	LB / LWB	2009	18 January 1991 (age 35)	(Denmark) Midtjylland	87	3
4	Jakob Blåbjerg	(Denmark)	CB / LB	2013	11 January 1995 (age 31)	(Denmark) AaB Academy	19	0
5	Kenneth Emil Petersen (VC)	(Denmark)	CB	2009	15 January 1985 (age 41)	(Denmark) AC Horsens	162	11
6	Jukka Raitala	(Finland)	CB / LB	2015	15 September 1988 (age 37)	(Denmark) Vestsjælland	0	0
20	Henrik Dalsgaard	(Denmark)	RB / RWB / RM / RW	2009	27 July 1989 (age 36)	(Denmark) Møldrup/Tostrup	164	10
32	Kasper Pedersen	(Denmark)	CB / RB	2013	13 January 1993 (age 33)	(Denmark) AaB Academy	19	2
Midfielders
2	Patrick Kristensen	(Denmark)	LB / RB / CM / RM / RW	2006	28 April 1987 (age 38)	(Denmark) AaB Academy	243	10
7	Thomas Enevoldsen	(Denmark)	CM / AM / LM / LW	2014	27 July 1987 (age 38)	(Belgium) Mechelen	145	17
8	Rasmus Würtz (C)	(Denmark)	CM / DM	2009	18 September 1983 (age 42)	(Denmark) Copenhagen	369	19
9	Thomas Augustinussen	(Denmark)	CM / DM	2011	20 March 1981 (age 44)	(Austria) Red Bull Salzburg	402	45
15	Gilli Rólantsson	(Faroe Islands)	LM / LW	2014	8 November 1992 (age 33)	(Faroe Islands) B36 Tórshavn	3	0
16	Mathias Thrane	(Denmark)	AM / RW	2014	12 May 1993 (age 32)	(Denmark) HIK	5	0
17	Christian Bassogog	(Cameroon)	AM / LM / LW	2015	18 October 1995 (age 30)	(United States) Wilmington Hammerheads	0	0
21	Kasper Risgård	(Denmark)	CM / AM / DM	2013	4 January 1983 (age 43)	(Denmark) Silkeborg IF	217	28
23	Nicolaj Thomsen	(Denmark)	CM / AM / LM / LW	2011	8 May 1993 (age 32)	(Denmark) AaB Academy	97	8
24	Asger Bust	(Denmark)	CM / DM	2015	24 September 1996 (age 29)	(Denmark) AaB Academy	0	0
25	Frederik Børsting	(Denmark)	CM / RM	2014	13 February 1995 (age 30)	(Denmark) AaB Academy	17	1
26	Robert Kakeeto	(Uganda)	CM / DM	2015	19 May 1995 (age 30)	(Denmark) AaB Academy	0	0
27	Oliver Abildgaard	(Denmark)	CM / RM	2015	10 June 1996 (age 29)	(Denmark) AaB Academy	0	0
30	Andreas Bruhn	(Denmark)	CM / AM / LM / LW	2013	17 February 1994 (age 31)	(Denmark) AaB Academy	31	1
Forwards
10	Rasmus Jönsson	(Sweden)	CF / RW	2014	27 January 1990 (age 36)	(Germany) VfL Wolfsburg	24	6
11	Nicklas Helenius	(Denmark)	CF	2014	8 May 1991 (age 34)	(England) Aston Villa	136	46
28	Viktor Ahlmann	(Denmark)	AM / LM / RM / CF / LW / RW	2014	13 January 1995 (age 31)	(Denmark) AaB Academy	3	0
33	Lukas Spalvis	(Lithuania)	CF	2013	27 July 1994 (age 31)	(Denmark) AaB Academy	29	11
79	Jannik Pohl	(Denmark)	CF	2015	6 April 1996 (age 29)	(Denmark) AaB Academy	0	0

Source: AaB Fodbold website

== Transfers and loans ==
=== In ===
==== Summer ====
Squad #	Position	Player	Transferred from	Fee	Date	Source
7	CF	(Denmark) Thomas Enevoldsen	(Belgium) Mechelen	Free transfer	19 June 2015	
11	ST	(Denmark) Nicklas Helenius	(England) Aston Villa	Free transfer	3 July 2015	
6	DF	(Finland) Jukka Raitala	(Denmark) Vestsjælland	Free transfer	17 July 2015	
17	LW	(Cameroon) Christian Bassogog	(United States) Wilmington Hammerheads	Free transfer	28 August 2015	

=== Out ===
==== Summer ====
Squad #	Position	Player	Transferred To	Fee	Date	Source
26	CB	(Denmark) Rasmus Thelander	(Greece) Panathinaikos	Undisclosed	2 July 2015	
18	ST	(Denmark) Anders K. Jacobsen	(Denmark) OB	Undisclosed	14 August 2015	

==== Winter ====
Squad #	Position	Player	Transferred To	Fee	Date	Source
6	LB	(Finland) Jukka Raitala	Free agent	Free transfer	1 January 2016	
20	RB	(Denmark) Henrik Dalsgaard	(Belgium) Zulte Waregem	Free transfer	1 January 2016	
14	AM	(Sweden) Andreas Blomqvist	(Sweden) IFK Norrköping	Free transfer	27 January 2016	

=== Loan out ===
Squad #	Position	Player	Loaned to	Start	End	Source
28	ST	(Denmark) Viktor Ahlmann	(Denmark) Vendsyssel	23 July 2015	31 December 2015	
11	ST	(Denmark) Nicklas Helenius	(Germany) SC Paderborn	1 February 2016	30 June 2016	
28	ST	(Denmark) Viktor Ahlmann	(Denmark) Jammerbugt	1 February 2016	30 June 2016	

=== Overall transfer activity ===
==== Spending ====
Summer: £0

Winter: £0

Total: £0

==== Income ====
Summer: £0

Winter: £0

Total: £0

==== Expenditure ====
Summer: £0

Winter: £0

Total: £0

== Friendlies ==
=== Pre-season ===
30 June 2015 Friendly	AaB (Denmark)	4 – 2	(Denmark) Viborg	Aalborg, Denmark
15:00 CEST	Helenius 32'; Spalvis 60', 64' (pen.); Pohl 78'	Report	Egeris 86'; Lerager 87'	Stadium: AaB Training Ground

7 July 2015 Friendly	Vendsyssel (Denmark)	0 – 1	(Denmark) AaB	Skagen, Denmark
19:00 CEST		Report	Helenius 45'	Stadium: Spar Nord Arena

11 July 2015 Friendly	AaB (Denmark)	2 – 0	(Denmark) AGF	Aalborg, Denmark
12:00 CEST	Helenius 23'; Bruhn 84'	Report		Stadium: Nordjyske Arena; Attendance: 2,000

28 July 2015 Friendly	Hamburger SV (Germany)	4 – 1	(Denmark) AaB	Flensburg, Germany
19:00 CEST	Jung 14'; Iličević 24'; Ostrzolek 30'; Demirbay 69' (pen.)	Report	Spalvis 51'	Stadium: Manfred-Werner Stadion; Attendance: 3,000

=== Mid-season ===
21 January 2016 Friendly	AaB (Denmark)	3 – 0	(Denmark) Hobro	Aalborg, Denmark
14:00 CET	Kakeeto 16'; Kristensen 21'; Augustinussen 81'	Report		Stadium: Provstejorden

30 January 2016 Friendly	St. Pauli (Germany)	2 – 4	(Denmark) AaB	Hamburg, Germany
14:00 CET	Thy 16'; Würtz 31' (o.g.)	Report	Enevoldsen 41', 56', 78'; Risgård 48'	Stadium: Millerntor; Attendance: 4,369; Referee: Sven Jablonski

4 February 2016 Friendly	Vendsyssel (Denmark)	1 – 3	(Denmark) AaB	Vrå, Denmark
14:00 CET	Olsen 70'	Report	Petersen 7'; Jönsson 57'; Bytyqi 62'	Stadium: Vrå Stadion

5 February 2016 Friendly	AaB (Denmark)	2 – 1	(Denmark) Skive IK	Aalborg, Denmark
14:00 CET	Thrane 31'; Bruhn 35'	Report	Zetterquist 44'	Stadium: Provstejorden

11 February 2016 Friendly	AaB (Denmark)	4 – 3	(Georgia (country)) Sioni	Belek, Turkey
16:00 CET	Bassogog 5', 13'; Bruhn 47'; Enevoldsen 70'	Report	Tatanashvili 14'; Goginashvili 67'; Petersen 85' (o.g.)	Stadium: Hotel Cornelia Diamond Golf Resort & Spa Football Centre

13 February 2016 Friendly	Slovan Bratislava (Slovakia)	3 – 3	(Denmark) AaB	Belek, Turkey
14:00 CET	Kubík 10'; Priskin 54'; Saláta 62'	Report	Enevoldsen 29'; Würtz 58'; Bassogog 76'	Stadium: Hotel Cornelia Diamond Golf Resort & Spa Football Centre

16 February 2016 Friendly	AaB (Denmark)	2 – 1	(Ukraine) Vorskla	Belek, Turkey
16:00 CET	Thomsen 68' (pen.); Blåbjerg 88'	Report	Sklyar 8'	Stadium: Hotel Cornelia Diamond Golf Resort & Spa Football Centre

23 February 2016 Friendly	AaB (Denmark)	3 – 0	(Sweden) Malmö FF	Aalborg, Denmark
15:00 CET	Jönsson 17'; Enevoldsen 22', 57'	Report		Stadium: Nordjyske Arena; Attendance: 4,744; Referee: Jakob Kehlet

== Competitions ==
=== Competition record ===
Competition	Record							
Competition	G	W	D	L	GF	GA	GD	Win %
Danish Superliga	28	15	4	9	53	35	+18	53.57
Danish Cup	6	4	1	1	14	5	+9	66.67
Total	34	19	5	10	67	40	+27	55.88

=== Danish Superliga ===
==== League table ====
Pos	Team	Pld	W	D	L	GF	GA	GD	Pts	Qualification or relegation
3	Midtjylland	33	17	8	8	57	33	+24	59	Qualification for the Europa League first qualifying round
4	Brøndby	33	16	6	11	43	37	+6	54	Qualification for the Europa League first qualifying round
5	AaB	33	15	5	13	56	44	+12	50	
6	Randers	33	13	8	12	45	43	+2	47	
7	Odense	33	14	4	15	50	52	−2	46	

Source: DBU, Soccerway
Rules for classification: 1) Points; 2) Goal difference; 3) Goals scored; 4) Head-to-head points; 5) Head-to-head goal difference; 6) Head-to-head goals scored; 7) Head-to-head away goals scored; 8) Play-off on neutral ground (only if rankings are important for medals, teams for relegation or teams for UEFA competitions); 9) Draw.

==== Results summary ====
Overall								Home						Away					
Pld	W	D	L	GF	GA	GD	Pts	W	D	L	GF	GA	GD	W	D	L	GF	GA	GD
28	15	4	9	53	35	+18	49	8	2	4	33	14	+19	7	2	5	20	21	−1

Last updated: 8 May 2016.
Source: Competitive matches

==== Results by round ====
Round	1	2	3	4	5	6	7	8	9	10	11	12	13	14	15	16	17	18	19	20	21	22	23	24	25	26	27	28	29	30	31	32	33
Ground	H	A	A	H	A	H	H	A	H	A	H	A	A	H	A	H	A	H	A	H	A	H	H	A	H	A	H	A	H	A	H	H	A
Result	D	W	L	L	W	W	L	L	W	L	W	W	L	W	W	W	W	W	D	L	L	D	W	W	L	D	W	W					
Position	6	3	5	8	7	2	5	7	5	7	5	4	6	4	3	3	2	2	2	2	4	3	2	2	4	4	3	3					

Updated to match(es) played on 8 May 2016. Source: superstats.dk
A = Away; H = Home; W = Win; D = Draw; L = Loss

==== Matches ====
20 July 2015 1	AaB	1 – 1	Esbjerg	Aalborg
19:00 CEST	Abildgaard 47'	Report	van Buren 12' (pen.)	Stadium: Nordjyske Arena; Attendance: 7,764; Referee: Michael Tykgaard

24 July 2015 2	Hobro	0 – 1	AaB	Hobro
18:00 CEST		Report	Risgård 90+3'	Stadium: DS Arena; Attendance: 4,686; Referee: Dennis Mogensen

3 August 2015 3	Nordsjælland	2 – 1	AaB	Farum
19:00 CEST	Bruninho 22'; Ingvartsen 85'	Report	Risgård 90'	Stadium: Farum Park; Attendance: 3,267; Referee: Jens Maae

10 August 2015 4	AaB	0 – 2	Midtjylland	Aalborg
19:00 CEST		Report	Royer 39'; Onuachu 90+3'	Stadium: Nordjyske Arena; Attendance: 7,077; Referee: Benjamin Helm Svedborg

15 August 2015 5	AGF	2 – 3	AaB	Aarhus
16:00 CEST	Elez 12'; Yasin 88'	Report	Spalvis 27', 51'; Jönsson 61'	Stadium: Ceres Park; Attendance: 10,114; Referee: Dennis Mogensen

24 August 2015 6	AaB	5 – 1	OB	Aalborg
19:00 CEST	Enevoldsen 9'; Risgård 16', 88'; Spalvis 58'; Børsting 89'	Report	Larsen 62'	Stadium: Nordjyske Arena; Attendance: 8,041; Referee: Jakob Kehlet

30 August 2015 7	AaB	0 – 2	Randers	Aalborg
13:30 CEST		Report	Lundberg 3'; Masango 82'	Stadium: Nordjyske Arena; Attendance: 6,188; Referee: Mads-Kristoffer Kristoffersen

13 September 2015 8	Copenhagen	4 – 2	AaB	Copenhagen
16:00 CEST	Cornelius 18'; Kusk 49'; Jørgensen 61'; Pedersen 70' (o.g.)	Report	Enevoldsen 10'; Spalvis 37'	Stadium: Telia Parken; Attendance: 13,253; Referee: Jakob Kehlet

20 September 2015 9	AaB	4 – 1	Brøndby	Aalborg
18:00 CEST	Spalvis 9', 72'; Jönsson 41'; Thomsen 50'	Report	Phiri 86'	Stadium: Nordjyske Arena; Attendance: 9,276; Referee: Lars Christoffersen

25 September 2015 10	Viborg	1 – 0	AaB	Viborg
20:00 CEST	Curth 53'	Report		Stadium: Energi Viborg Arena; Attendance: 5,137; Referee: Peter Rasmussen

4 October 2015 11	AaB	5 – 0	SønderjyskE	Aalborg
13:30 CEST	Spalvis 4', 65'; Thomsen 16'; Enevoldsen 60'; Børsting 68'	Report		Stadium: Nordjyske Arena; Attendance: 5,518; Referee: Jakob Kehlet

19 October 2015 12	Esbjerg	1 – 2	AaB	Esbjerg
19:00 CEST	Larsen 20' (o.g.)	Report	Risgård 41'; Spalvis 77'	Stadium: Blue Water Arena; Attendance: 5,461; Referee: Jørgen Daugbjerg Burchardt

25 October 2015 13	Nordsjælland	3 – 0	AaB	Farum
13:30 CET	Bruninho 21', 59'; John 77'	Report		Stadium: Farum Park; Attendance: 3,801; Referee: Dennis Mogensen

1 November 2015 14	AaB	6 – 0	Hobro	Aalborg
13:30 CET	Pedersen 34'; Spalvis 45+2', 72'; Enevoldsen 58'; Thrane 88'; Jönsson 90+2'	Report		Stadium: Nordjyske Arena; Attendance: 8,355; Referee: Michael Johansen

6 November 2015 15	SønderjyskE	1 – 2	AaB	Haderslev
18:00 CET	Kanstrup 65'	Report	Enevoldsen 40', 66'	Stadium: Sydbank Park; Attendance: 3,855; Referee: Jakob Kehlet

23 November 2015 16	AaB	3 – 2	Randers	Aalborg
19:00 CET	Enevoldsen 63'; Spalvis 79', 90+6'	Report	Marxen 3'; Petersen 69' (o.g.)	Stadium: Nordjyske Arena; Attendance: 5,831; Referee: Michael Tykgaard

29 November 2015 17	Brøndby	0 – 2	AaB	Brøndby
16:00 CET	Enevoldsen 25'; Spalvis 39'	Report		Stadium: Brøndby Stadion; Attendance: 10,058; Referee: Anders Poulsen

7 December 2015 18	AaB	2 – 0	Viborg	Aalborg
19:00 CET	Jönsson 25'; Enevoldsen 65'	Report		Stadium: Nordjyske Arena; Attendance: 8,360; Referee: Mads-Kristoffer Kristoffersen

29 February 2016 19	Midtjylland	1 – 1	AaB	Herning
19:00 CET	Poulsen 42' (pen.)	Report	Spalvis 54'	Stadium: MCH Arena; Attendance: 6,932; Referee: Mads-Kristoffer Kristoffersen

4 March 2016 20	AaB	0 – 1	OB	Aalborg
18:00 CET		Report	Festersen 57'	Stadium: Nordjyske Arena; Attendance: 5,620; Referee: Peter Kjærsgaard-Andersen

13 March 2016 21	Copenhagen	6 – 2	AaB	Copenhagen
18:00 CET	Santander 8', 47'; Kusk 11'; Jørgensen 40'; Toutouh 75'; Cornelius 82'	Report	Risgård 38'; Enevoldsen 68'	Stadium: Telia Parken; Attendance: 16,296; Referee: Jakob Kehlet

18 March 2016 22	AaB	2 – 2	AGF	Aalborg
18:00 CET	Spalvis 32'; Jønsson 90+3' (o.g.)	Report	Duncan 87'; Rasmussen 90+4'; Duncan (penalty missed) 90+1'	Stadium: Nordjyske Arena; Attendance: 6,648; Referee: Anders Poulsen

1 April 2016 23	AaB	1 – 0	Nordsjælland	Aalborg
18:00 CEST	Enevoldsen 25'	Report		Stadium: Nordjyske Arena; Attendance: 5,447; Referee: Michael Tykgaard

10 April 2016 24	Hobro	0 – 2	AaB	Hobro
13:00 CEST		Report	Thomsen 62', 75'	Stadium: DS Arena; Attendance: 3,487; Referee: Peter Kjærsgaard-Andersen

17 April 2016 25	AaB	1 – 2	SønderjyskE	Aalborg
16:00 CEST	Jönsson 12'	Report	Dal Hende 17'; Bechmann 70'	Stadium: Nordjyske Arena; Attendance: 6,185; Referee: Jacob Kehlet

25 April 2016 26	Randers	0 – 0	AaB	Randers
19:00 CEST		Report		Stadium: BioNutria Park Randers; Attendance: 4,136; Referee: Mads-Kristoffer Kristoffersen

1 May 2016 27	AaB	3 – 0	Brøndby	Aalborg
16:00 CEST	Thomsen 51'; Spalvis 62', 75' (pen.)	Report		Stadium: Nordjyske Arena; Attendance: 9,420; Referee: Dennis Mogensen

8 May 2016 28	Viborg	0 – 2	AaB	Viborg
13:00 CEST		Report	Risgård 7'; Thomsen 86'	Stadium: Energi Viborg Arena; Attendance: 4,655; Referee: Benjamin Helm Svedborg

12 May 2016 29	AaB	v	Copenhagen	Aalborg
20:00 CEST				Stadium: Nordjyske Arena

17 May 2016 30	AGF	v	AaB	Aarhus
19:00 CEST				Stadium: Ceres Park

22 May 2016 31	AaB	v	Esbjerg	Aalborg
18:00 CEST				Stadium: Nordjyske Arena

26 May 2016 32	AaB	v	Midtjylland	Aalborg
20:00 CEST				Stadium: Nordjyske Arena

29 May 2016 33	OB	v	AaB	Odense
17:00 CEST				Stadium: TRE-FOR Park

=== Danish Cup ===
9 September 2015 2nd round	Vendsyssel (2)	0 – 2	AaB	Hjørring
20:15 CEST		Report	Enevoldsen 4'; Thomsen 56'	Stadium: Bredbånd Nord Arena; Attendance: 5,083; Referee: Jens Maae

29 September 2015 3rd round	Lystrup IF (4)	0 – 4	AaB	Aalborg^{1}
18:00 CEST		Report	Rólantsson 27'; Thomsen 28'; Pohl 45+1', 59'	Stadium: Nordjyske Arena; Attendance: 3,407; Referee: Mads-Kristoffer Kristoffersen

28 October 2015 4th round	Lyngby (2)	1 – 2	AaB	Kongens Lyngby
20:45 CET	Odgaard 88'	Report	Pedersen 33'; Spalvis 68'; Spalvis (red card) 77'	Stadium: Lyngby Stadion; Attendance: 1,399; Referee: Peter Kjærsgaard-Andersen

5 April 2016 Quarter-final	FC Roskilde (2)	0 – 4	AaB	Roskilde
18:00 CEST		Report	Thomsen 26' (pen.); Enevoldsen 32', 39'; Børsting 54'	Stadium: Roskilde Idrætspark; Attendance: 2,569; Referee: Anders Poulsen

13 April 2016 Semi-finals, first leg	AaB	0 – 2	AGF (1)	Aalborg
18:00 CEST		Report	Bjarnason 22'; Duncan 62'	Stadium: Nordjyske Arena; Attendance: 7,196; Referee: Jørgen Daugbjerg Burchardt

21 April 2016 Semi-finals, second leg	AGF (1)	2 – 2 (4 – 2 agg.)	AaB	Aarhus
20:00 CEST	Petersen 56' (o.g.); Bjarnason 90+2'	Report	Enevoldsen 26'; Thomsen 52'	Stadium: Ceres Park; Attendance: 14,094; Referee: Peter Kjærsgaard-Andersen

Notes

- Note 1: Due to inadequate stadium security facilities at Lystrup IF's home ground, Lystrup Idrætsanlæg, the match was relocated to Nordjyske Arena, Aalborg.

== Statistics ==
=== Appearances ===
As of 8 May 2016

This includes all competitive matches. The list is sorted by shirt number when total appearances are equal.

Rnk	Pos	No.	Player	Superliga	Cup	Total
1	GK	1	(Denmark) Nicolai Larsen	28	6	34
1	MF	23	(Denmark) Nicolaj Thomsen	28	6	34
3	FW	10	(Sweden) Rasmus Jönsson	28	4	32
4	DF	5	(Denmark) Kenneth Emil Petersen	27	4	31
4	MF	7	(Denmark) Thomas Enevoldsen	27	4	31
6	MF	21	(Denmark) Kasper Risgård	26	4	30
6	FW	33	(Lithuania) Lukas Spalvis	27	3	30
8	DF	32	(Denmark) Kasper Pedersen	22	6	28
9	MF	8	(Denmark) Rasmus Würtz	23	4	27
9	MF	25	(Denmark) Frederik Børsting	24	3	27
11	DF	4	(Denmark) Jakob Blåbjerg	22	4	26
12	DF	2	(Denmark) Patrick Kristensen	18	4	22
13	DF	20	(Denmark) Henrik Dalsgaard	17	1	18
14	MF	27	(Denmark) Oliver Abildgaard	11	4	15
15	DF	15	(Faroe Islands) Gilli Rólantsson	10	4	14
16	DF	3	(Denmark) Jakob Ahlmann	10	2	12
16	FW	11	(Denmark) Nicklas Helenius	10	2	12
16	MF	30	(Denmark) Andreas Bruhn	7	5	12
19	MF	9	(Denmark) Thomas Augustinussen	6	2	8
20	FW	79	(Denmark) Jannik Pohl	4	5	9
21	MF	16	(Denmark) Mathias Thrane	5	2	7
22	DF	6	(Finland) Jukka Raitala	5	1	6
22	FW	17	(Cameroon) Christian Bassogog	4	2	6
24	MF	14	(Sweden) Andreas Blomqvist	0	2	2
25	MF	26	(Uganda) Robert Kakeeto	1	0	1

=== Goalscorers ===
As of 8 May 2016

This includes all competitive matches. The list is sorted by shirt number when total goals are equal.

Rnk	Pos	No.	Player	Superliga	Cup	Total
1	FW	33	(Lithuania) Lukas Spalvis	18	1	19
2	MF	7	(Denmark) Thomas Enevoldsen	11	4	15
3	MF	23	(Denmark) Nicolaj Thomsen	6	4	10
4	MF	21	(Denmark) Kasper Risgård	7	0	7
5	FW	10	(Sweden) Rasmus Jönsson	5	0	5
6	MF	25	(Denmark) Frederik Børsting	2	1	3
7	DF	32	(Denmark) Kasper Pedersen	1	1	2
7	FW	79	(Denmark) Jannik Pohl	0	2	2
9	DF	15	(Faroe Islands) Gilli Rólantsson	0	1	1
9	MF	16	(Denmark) Mathias Thrane	1	0	1
9	MF	27	(Denmark) Oliver Abildgaard	1	0	1
—	Own Goals			1	0	1
TOTALS				53	14	67

=== Assists ===
As of 8 May 2016

This includes all competitive matches. The list is sorted by shirt number when total assists are equal.

Rnk	Pos	No.	Player	Superliga	Cup	Total
1	MF	23	(Denmark) Nicolaj Thomsen	9	0	9
2	MF	7	(Denmark) Thomas Enevoldsen	5	1	6
2	MF	25	(Denmark) Frederik Børsting	4	2	6
4	DF	4	(Denmark) Jakob Blåbjerg	4	0	4
4	DF	20	(Denmark) Henrik Dalsgaard	3	1	4
6	FW	10	(Sweden) Rasmus Jönsson	3	0	3
7	MF	21	(Denmark) Kasper Risgård	2	0	2
7	DF	32	(Denmark) Kasper Pedersen	1	1	2
9	DF	2	(Denmark) Patrick Kristensen	1	0	1
9	DF	3	(Denmark) Jakob Ahlmann	1	0	1
9	DF	5	(Denmark) Kenneth Emil Petersen	1	0	1
9	DF	6	(Finland) Jukka Raitala	1	0	1
9	MF	8	(Denmark) Rasmus Würtz	0	1	1
9	MF	14	(Sweden) Andreas Blomqvist	0	1	1
9	FW	17	(Cameroon) Christian Bassogog	1	0	1
9	MF	30	(Denmark) Andreas Bruhn	0	1	1
9	FW	33	(Lithuania) Lukas Spalvis	1	0	1
9	FW	79	(Denmark) Jannik Pohl	1	0	0
TOTALS				38	8	46

=== Clean sheets ===
As of 8 May 2016

This includes all competitive matches. The list is sorted by shirt number when total clean sheets are equal.

Rnk	Pos	No.	Player	Superliga	Cup	Total
1	GK	1	(Denmark) Nicolai Larsen	10	3	13
TOTALS				10	3	13

=== Disciplinary record ===
As of 8 May 2016

This includes all competitive matches. The list is sorted by shirt number when total cards are equal.

Rnk	Pos.	No.	Player	Superliga		Cup		Total	
Rnk	Pos.	No.	Player	Booked	Sent off (straight red)	Booked	Sent off (straight red)	Booked	Sent off (straight red)
1	FW	33	(Lithuania) Lukas Spalvis	3	0	0	1	3	1
2	MF	8	(Denmark) Rasmus Würtz	8	0	2	0	10	0
3	MF	21	(Denmark) Kasper Risgård	7	0	0	0	7	0
4	MF	7	(Denmark) Thomas Enevoldsen	4	0	1	0	5	0
4	MF	25	(Denmark) Frederik Børsting	4	0	1	0	5	0
6	DF	5	(Denmark) Kenneth Emil Petersen	4	0	0	0	4	0
7	GK	1	(Denmark) Nicolai Larsen	3	0	0	0	3	0
7	FW	10	(Sweden) Rasmus Jönsson	3	0	0	0	3	0
9	DF	3	(Denmark) Jakob Ahlmann	1	0	1	0	2	0
9	DF	4	(Denmark) Jakob Blåbjerg	2	0	0	0	2	0
9	MF	27	(Denmark) Oliver Abildgaard	0	0	2	0	2	0
9	DF	32	(Denmark) Kasper Pedersen	1	0	1	0	2	0
13	DF	6	(Finland) Jukka Raitala	1	0	0	0	1	0
13	MF	9	(Denmark) Thomas Augustinussen	1	0	0	0	1	0
13	DF	20	(Denmark) Henrik Dalsgaard	1	0	0	0	1	0
13	MF	26	(Uganda) Robert Kakeeto	1	0	0	0	1	0
13	MF	30	(Denmark) Andreas Bruhn	0	0	1	0	1	0
13	FW	79	(Denmark) Jannik Pohl	0	0	1	0	1	0
TOTALS				44	0	10	1	54	1

=== Summary ===
As of 8 May 2016

Games played	34 (28 Danish Superliga, 6 Danish Cup)
Games won	19 (15 Danish Superliga, 4 Danish Cup)
Games drawn	5 (4 Danish Superliga, 1 Danish Cup)
Games lost	10 (9 Danish Superliga, 1 Danish Cup)
Goals scored	67 (53 Danish Superliga, 14 Danish Cup)
Goals conceded	40 (35 Danish Superliga, 5 Danish Cup)
Goal difference	+27 (+18 Danish Superliga, +9 Danish Cup)
Clean sheets	13 (10 Danish Superliga, 3 Danish Cup)
Yellow cards	54 (44 Danish Superliga, 10 Danish Cup)
Red cards	1 (1 Danish Cup)
Best result(s)	W 6 – 0 (H) v Hobro – Danish Superliga – 1 November 2015
Worst result(s)	L 6 – 2 (A) v Copenhagen – Danish Superliga – 13 March 2016
Most appearances	Nicolai Larsen & Nicolaj Thomsen (34 appearances)
Top scorer(s)	Lukas Spalvis (19 goals)
Top assister(s)	Nicolaj Thomsen (9 assists)
Worst discipline	Lukas Spalvis (1 (red card) , 3 (yellow card) )

== Awards ==
=== Individual ===
No.	Player	Award	Month	Source
33	(Lithuania) Lukas Spalvis	AaB Goal of the Month August	September 2015	
33	(Lithuania) Lukas Spalvis	AaB Goal of the Month September	October 2015	
33	(Lithuania) Lukas Spalvis	Danish Superliga Player of the Month October	November 2015	
33	(Lithuania) Lukas Spalvis	AaB Goal of the Month October	November 2015	
33	(Lithuania) Lukas Spalvis	Tipsbladet Profil of the Autumn	December 2015	
33	(Lithuania) Lukas Spalvis	Lithuanian Player of the Year 2015	December 2015	
7	(Denmark) Thomas Enevoldsen	Danish Superliga Player of the Month November	December 2015	
10	(Sweden) Rasmus Jönsson	AaB Goal of the Months November/December	December 2015	

=== Team ===
Award	Month	Source
