= Rasmus Thellufsen =

Danish footballer (born 1997)

Personal information
- Full name: Rasmus Thellufsen Pedersen
- Date of birth: 9 January 1997 (age 29)
- Place of birth: Sæby, Denmark
- Height: 1.85 m (6 ft 1 in)
- Position: Midfielder

Team information
- Current team: Birżebbuġa St. Peter's
- Number: 18

Youth career
- Skjold Sæby
- AaB

Senior career*
| Years | Team | Apps | (Gls) |
| 2016–2020 | AaB | 62 | (6) |
| 2019–2020 | → Hansa Rostock (loan) | 14 | (3) |
| 2020–2022 | Lyngby | 58 | (6) |
| 2023 | Louisville City | 30 | (1) |
| 2024–2025 | Vendsyssel | 25 | (2) |
| 2025–2026 | Bryne | 8 | (0) |
| 2026– | Birżebbuġa St. Peter's | 10 | (0) |

International career
| 2013 | Denmark U16 | 3 | (0) |
| 2014 | Denmark U17 | 2 | (0) |
| 2017 | Denmark U20 | 4 | (2) |
| 2017–2019 | Denmark U21 | 2 | (0) |
- * Club domestic league appearances and goals as of 7 November 2026

Rasmus Thellufsen Pedersen (Danish pronunciation: [ˈtsʰelɔfsn̩]; born 9 January 1997) is a Danish professional footballer who plays as a midfielder for Birżebbuġa St. Peter's.

== Club career ==
=== AaB ===
Thellufsen was promoted to the senior team of AaB along with U19 teammates Magnus Christensen, Morten Rokkedal, Sebastian Grønning, Joakim Mæhle and Bardhec Bytyqi during the 2016–17 pre-season. Sports Director of AaB, Allan Gaarde, described Rasmus as a classic creative midfielder with forces in dribbling and creating the unexpected. The 28 of August, Thellufsen debuted in the Danish Superliga as a substitute for an injured Kasper Risgård in the 34th minute against AGF. A week later, at 7 September, he would get his first starting position in the Danish Cup against Nørresundby from the lower divisions.

On 29 August 2019, Hansa Rostock signed Thellufsen on loan until the end of 2019–20 season.

=== Lyngby ===
Thellufsen left AaB on 6 September 2020, signing with Lyngby Boldklub. He suffered relegation to the Danish 1st Division with the club on 9 May 2021 after a loss to last placed AC Horsens.

On 25 July 2021, Thellufsen scored his first goal for Lyngby, securing a 2–1 away win over Nykøbing deep into injury time, after having come on as a substitute for Magnus Westergaard in the 81st minute. Mainly utilised as a defensive midfielder, Thellufsen had an impressive streak at the end of the 2021–22 season as a central midfielder with three goals in the final two matchdays. His performances helped Lyngby win promotion to the Superliga.

=== Louisville City ===
On 5 January 2023, Thellufsen was sold to USL Championship club Louisville City. He was released by Louisville following the 2023 season.

=== Vendsyssel FF ===
In January 2024, Thellufsen returned to Denmark, signing with Danish 1st Division side Vendsyssel FF.

Thellufsen left Vendsyssel in June 2025.

=== Bryne ===
On 8 September 2025, Thellufsen signed for Norwegian Eliteserien side Bryne.

=== Birżebbuġa St. Peter's ===
On 6 August 2026, he signed for Birżebbuġa St. Peter's in Maltese Premier League.

== Career statistics ==
As of match played 12 November 2022

Appearances and goals by club, season and competition
| Club | Season | League | | | Cup | | Europe | | Other | | Total | |
| Club | Season | Division | Apps | Goals | Apps | Goals | Apps | Goals | Apps | Goals | Apps | Goals |
|---|---|---|---|---|---|---|---|---|---|---|---|---|
| AaB | 2016–17 | Superliga | 12 | 1 | 3 | 4 | — | | 2 (Note: Appearance(s) in Danish Superliga Europa League play-off) | 1 | 17 | 6 |
| AaB | 2017–18 | Superliga | 19 | 1 | 3 | 0 | — | | — | | 22 | 1 |
| AaB | 2018–19 | Superliga | 29 | 4 | 4 | 0 | — | | 2 | 0 | 35 | 4 |
| AaB | 2019–20 | Superliga | 2 | 0 | 0 | 0 | — | | — | | 2 | 0 |
| AaB | Total | | 62 | 6 | 10 | 4 | — | | 4 | 1 | 76 | 11 |
| Hansa Rostock (loan) | 2019–20 | 3. Liga | 14 | 3 | 0 | 0 | — | | 4 (Note: Appearance(s) in Mecklenburg-Vorpommern Cup) | 1 | 18 | 4 |
| Lyngby | 2020–21 | Superliga | 17 | 0 | 3 | 0 | — | | — | | 20 | 0 |
| Lyngby | 2021–22 | 1st Division | 32 | 6 | 2 | 0 | — | | — | | 34 | 6 |
| Lyngby | 2022–23 | Superliga | 9 | 0 | 1 | 0 | — | | — | | 10 | 0 |
| Lyngby | Total | | 53 | 6 | 6 | 0 | — | | — | | 64 | 6 |
| Louisville City | 2023 | USL Championship | 0 | 0 | 0 | 0 | — | | 0 | 0 | 0 | 0 |
| Career total | | | 134 | 15 | 16 | 4 | — | | 8 | 2 | 158 | 21 |

== Honours ==
AaB

- Danish Cup
  - Runner-up: 2019–20

Lyngby

- Danish 1st Division
  - Runner-up (promotion): 2021–22
