= Oliver Abildgaard =

Danish footballer (born 1996)

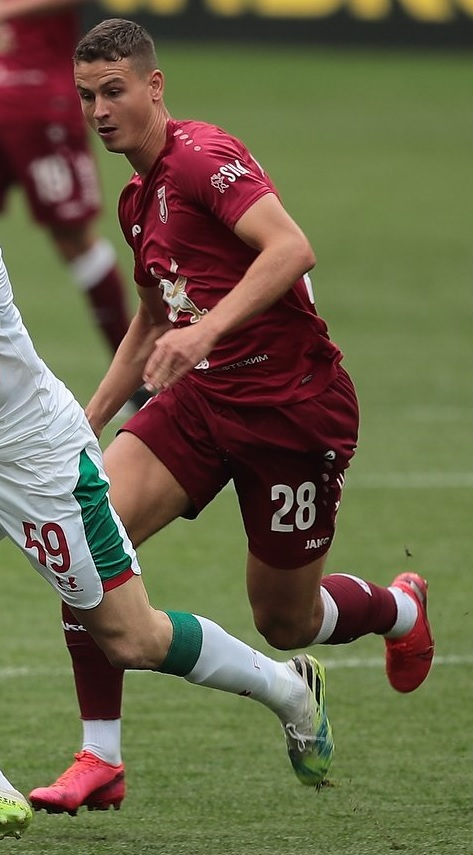
- Abildgaard with Rubin Kazan in 2020

Personal information
- Full name: Oliver Abildgaard Nielsen
- Date of birth: 10 June 1996 (age 30)
- Place of birth: Hasseris, Denmark
- Height: 1.93 m (6 ft 4 in)
- Position: Midfielder

Team information
- Current team: Sampdoria
- Number: 28

Youth career
- –2006: Aalborg Freja
- 2006–2015: AaB

Senior career*
Years	Team	Apps	(Gls)
2015–2020	AaB	79	(3)
2020	→ Rubin Kazan (loan)	5	(0)
2020–2023	Rubin Kazan	54	(1)
2022–2023	→ Celtic (loan)	6	(0)
2023	→ Hellas Verona (loan)	13	(0)
2023–2025	Como	29	(2)
2024–2025	→ Pisa (loan)	24	(0)
2025–	Sampdoria	29	(1)

International career
2015	Denmark U20	1	(0)
2016–2019	Denmark U21	12	(2)
2020	Denmark	1	(0)
- * Club domestic league appearances and goals as of 13 May 2026

Oliver Abildgaard Nielsen (born 10 June 1996) is a Danish professional footballer who plays as a defensive midfielder for Serie B club Sampdoria.

== Club career ==
=== AaB ===
Abildgaard began his football career with Aalborg Freja before joining the youth academy of AaB at the age of ten. He was promoted to AaB's first-team squad in the summer of 2015 alongside Jannik Pohl from the club's under-19 side.

Abildgaard made his senior debut on 20 July 2015, starting in a 1–1 draw against Esbjerg in the Danish Superliga. He conceded a penalty that led to Esbjerg's opening goal but later scored the equaliser. He made his Danish Cup debut later that year, featuring against local rivals Vendsyssel FF.

During his first season, Abildgaard made 14 league appearances, including seven starts. Over the following two campaigns, he remained primarily a squad player. In the 2016–17 season, AaB finished the regular season in the relegation round and subsequently qualified for the European play-offs, where they were eliminated by Randers. In the 2017–18 season, the club progressed to the championship round, with Abildgaard making seven appearances, six as a starter.

The 2018–19 season marked a breakthrough for Abildgaard, as he became a more regular presence in the starting lineup. However, his campaign was curtailed by a back injury sustained during the relegation round. In the first half of the 2019–20 season, he continued to feature regularly, albeit not consistently in the starting eleven. At that time, his contract with AaB was set to run until 2022.

=== Rubin Kazan ===
On 3 February 2020, Abildgaard joined Russian Premier League side Rubin Kazan on loan, with an option to buy at the end of the 2019–20 season. He made his debut for the club on 1 March 2020 in a league match against Tambov, starting the game before being substituted around the hour mark by Zuriko Davitashvili; the match ended in a goalless draw.

On 20 June 2020, AaB confirmed that Rubin Kazan had exercised the purchase option, with Abildgaard signing a permanent contract until 30 June 2024. He quickly became a regular starter and was an important figure during the 2020–21 season, helping Rubin Kazan finish fourth in the Russian Premier League and qualify for the inaugural UEFA Europa Conference League. The club entered the competition in the third qualifying round, where they were eliminated by Polish side Raków Częstochowa. In the 2021–22 season, Abildgaard continued to feature regularly, often playing the full 90 minutes, although he missed part of the campaign due to muscular issues. Rubin Kazan were relegated from the Russian Premier League at the end of the season.

==== Loan to Celtic ====
Following the Russian invasion of Ukraine, FIFA introduced regulations allowing foreign players in Russia to suspend their contracts until the end of the 2021–22 season and sign with clubs outside the country during that period. On 1 September 2022, Abildgaard moved on loan to Celtic in Scotland for the 2022–23 season. Due to lack of playing time, Abildgaard's loan spell at Celtic was terminated.

==== Loan to Hellas Verona ====
On 31 January 2023, he joined Serie A club Hellas Verona on a loan-deal for the remainder of the season.

=== Como ===
On 12 July 2023, Abildgaard joined Serie B club Como on a three-year deal. On 30 August 2024, he was loaned to Pisa in Serie B, with an option to buy.

=== Sampdoria ===
On 20 August 2025, Abildgaard moved to Sampdoria on a two-season deal.

== International career ==
Abildgaard made one appearance for the Denmark under-20 national team before progressing to the under-21 level. He debuted for the Denmark U21 team on 20 January 2016 in a goalless friendly against Ukraine in Belek, Turkey. Abildgaard was later selected for the squad that competed at the 2019 UEFA European Under-21 Championship in Italy and San Marino. He featured once during the tournament, playing in the group stage match against defending champions Germany, as Denmark were eliminated after the group phase.

On 11 November 2020, Abildgaard earned his first senior cap for Denmark, appearing in a friendly match against Sweden.

== Career statistics ==
=== Club ===
As of match played 25 April 2025

Appearances and goals by club, season and competition
Club	Season	League			Cup		Other		Total	
Club	Season	Division	Apps	Goals	Apps	Goals	Apps	Goals	Apps	Goals
AaB	2015–16	Danish Superliga	14	1	2	0	—		16	1
AaB	2016–17	Danish Superliga	12	0	2	0	—		14	0
AaB	2017–18	Danish Superliga	17	0	1	0	—		18	0
AaB	2018–19	Danish Superliga	25	1	2	0	—		27	1
AaB	2019–20	Danish Superliga	11	1	1	1	—		12	2
AaB	Total		79	3	8	1	0	0	87	4
Rubin Kazan (loan)	2019–20	Russian Premier League	11	0	—		—		11	0
Rubin Kazan	2020–21	Russian Premier League	28	0	1	0	—		29	0
Rubin Kazan	2021–22	Russian Premier League	20	1	0	0	2 (Note: Appearances in the UEFA Europa Conference League)	0	22	1
Rubin Kazan	Total		59	1	1	0	2	0	62	1
Celtic (loan)	2022–23	Scottish Premiership	6	0	1 (Note: Appearances in the Scottish League Cup)	0	2 (Note: Appearances in the UEFA Champions League)	0	9	0
Hellas Verona (loan)	2022–23	Serie A	13	0	—		—		13	0
Como	2023–24	Serie B	28	2	1	0	—		29	2
Como	2024–25	Serie A	1	0	0	0	—		1	0
Como	Total		29	2	1	0	—		30	2
Pisa (loan)	2024–25	Serie B	21	0	1	0	—		22	0
Career total			207	6	12	1	4	0	223	7

=== International ===
As of match played 11 November 2020

Appearances and goals by national team and year
National team	Year	Apps	Goals
Denmark
Denmark	2020	1	0
Total		1	0
