= Yann Rolim =

Brazilian footballer (born 1995)

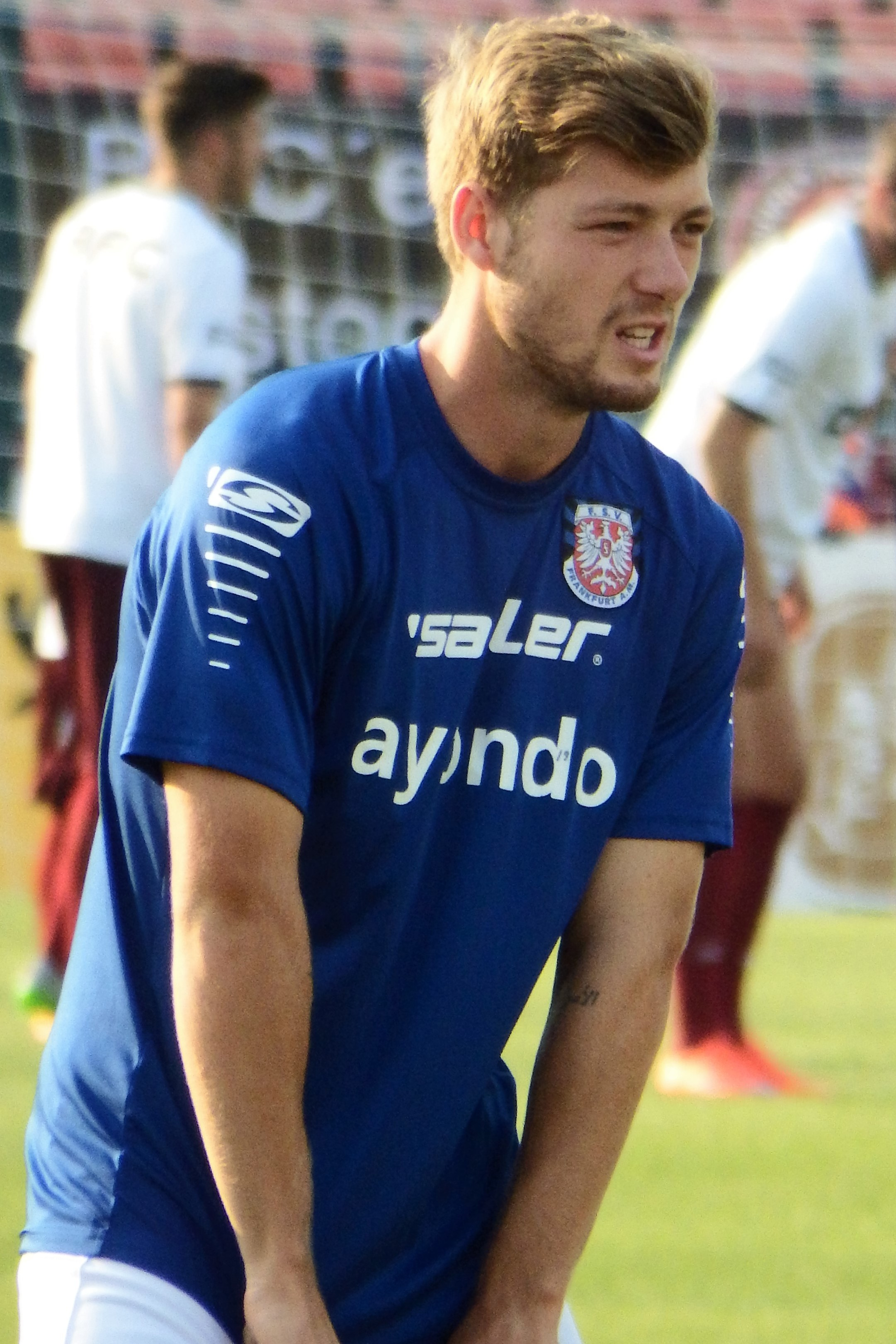
- Rolim in 2015

Personal information
- Full name: Yann del Pino Rolim
- Date of birth: 15 March 1995 (age 31)
- Place of birth: Gramado, Brazil
- Height: 1.77 m (5 ft 10 in)
- Position: Midfielder

Team information
- Current team: Ituano (on loan from Tombense)

Youth career
- 2012: Juventude

Senior career*
Years	Team	Apps	(Gls)
2013–2014	Juventude	16	(1)
2014–	Barra-SC	0	(0)
2014–2015	→ Vitória Setúbal (loan)	13	(1)
2015–2016	→ FSV Frankfurt (loan)	15	(2)
2016–2017	→ Karlsruher SC (loan)	21	(1)
2017–2018	→ AaB (loan)	21	(4)
2018–2020	→ Chapecoense (loan)	36	(0)
2021	→ Joinville (loan)	17	(3)
2021–2022	→ CSA (loan)	45	(4)
2023	Tombense	7	(1)
2023–	→ Ituano (loan)	0	(0)
- * Club domestic league appearances and goals as of 27 February 2023

Yann del Pino Rolim (born 15 March 1995) is a Brazilian professional footballer who plays as a midfielder for Ituano, on loan from Tombense.
