= Pavol Šafranko =

Slovak footballer (born 1994)

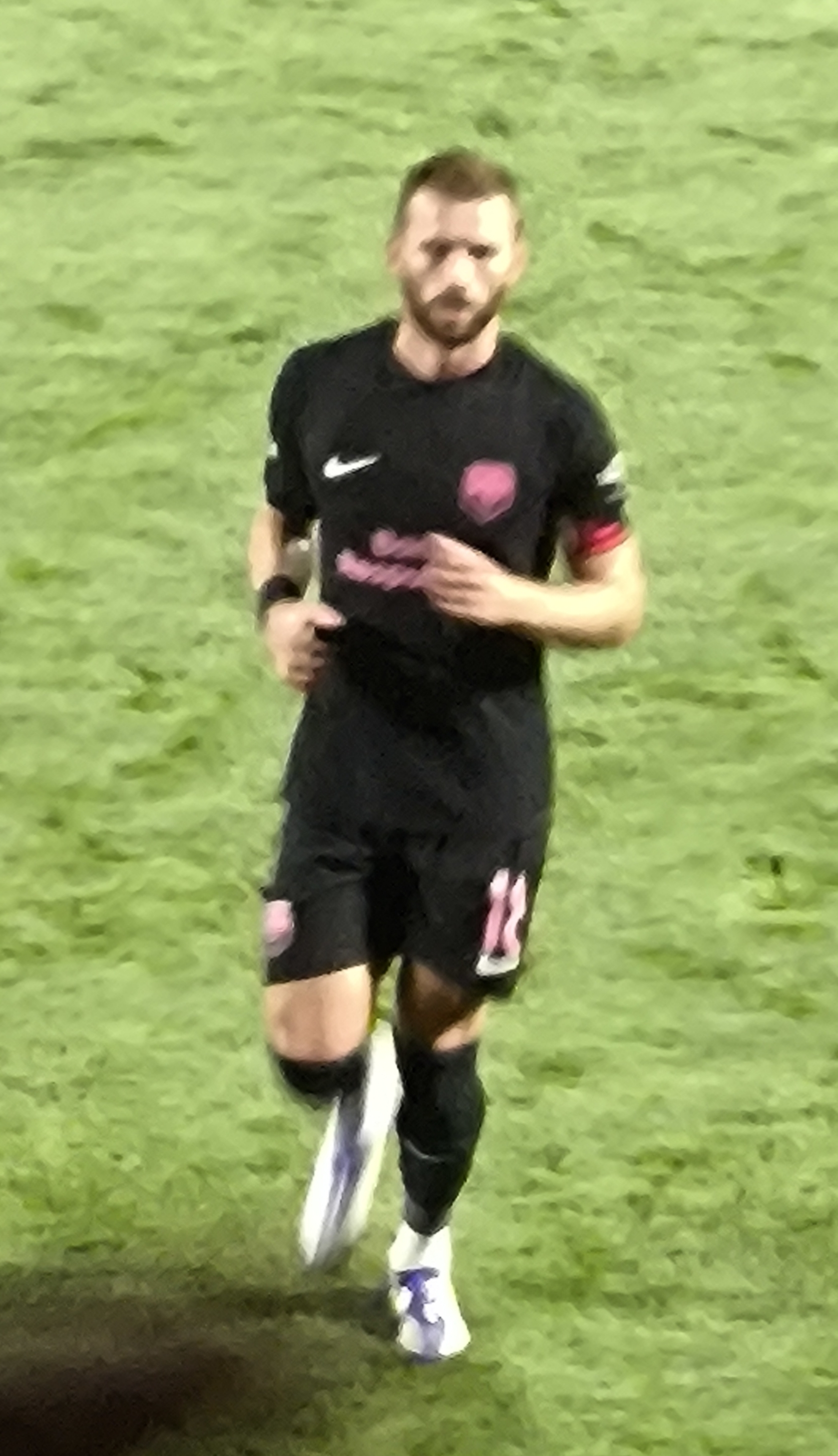
- Šafranko with Sabah in 2025

Personal information
- Full name: Pavol Šafranko
- Date of birth: 16 November 1994 (age 32)
- Place of birth: Stropkov, Slovakia
- Height: 1.85 m (6 ft 1 in)
- Position: Forward

Team information
- Current team: DAC Dunajská Streda
- Number: 16

Youth career
- –2011: Tesla Stropkov
- 2011–2013: Tatran Prešov

Senior career*
Years	Team	Apps	(Gls)
2013–2016	Tatran Prešov	54	(17)
2016	→ ŽP Šport Podbrezová (loan)	32	(5)
2017	DAC Dunajská Streda	16	(6)
2017–2019	AaB	30	(2)
2018–2019	→ Dundee United (loan)	33	(12)
2019–2021	Sepsi OSK	67	(17)
2021–2022	Mamelodi Sundowns	16	(5)
2022–2024	Sepsi OSK	66	(13)
2024–2026	Sabah	39	(10)
2026–	DAC Dunajská Streda	5	(1)

International career
2015–2017	Slovakia U21	15	(4)
2017–2020	Slovakia	10	(0)
- * Club domestic league appearances and goals as of 7 November 2026

Pavol Šafranko (born 16 November 1994) is a Slovak professional footballer who plays as a forward for Slovak Football League club DAC Dunajská Streda.

== Club career ==
=== Tatran Prešov ===
Born in Stropkov, eastern Slovakia, Šafranko began his football career in the local club Tesla Stropkov, whose senior side only plays in lower regional divisions of the Slovak league system. He later transferred to Slovakia's oldest club, and the biggest one in Prešov Region, Tatran Prešov, where he spent two years in the youth teams. After graduation from the academy, he made a competitive debut for Tatran in a II. liga fixture against Spartak Trnava B, in a 7–0 victory, in the first round on 20 July 2013. He came on in the 82nd minute as a substitute for Peter Nworah. Overall, in his first season in senior football, he made 18 appearances, but made it to the starting line-up only once, again against Spartak Trnava B, on 6 October 2013.

=== ŽP Šport Podbrezová ===
In the next one and a half season he spent in Prešov, Šafranko played 38 games and scored 20 goals. These good performances got him transferred to ŽP Šport Podbrezová, who was a top division club, despite being a village of just over 4,000 people. Šafranko made a Fortuna liga debut on 27 February 2016, in a 1–0 home win over Senica. Unlike his premier season at Tatran, Šafranko immediately became a starting line-up player, although he only scored a single goal against Zemplín Michalovce (2–0 win) on 2 April 2016. In the autumn period of the 2016–17 Fortuna liga he however scored 4 in 18 games, attracting the attention of an ambitious club from the upper half of the table DAC Dunajská Streda, to which he transferred in January 2017.

=== DAC 1904 Dunajská Streda ===
After he only spent roughly half a year in DAC, but managed to score 6 goals in 17 competitive games, Šafranko was transferred to his first international club. On 21 August 2017 it was announced that he joins Aalborg, playing in the Superligaen.

=== AaB Aalborg ===
In Aalborg, Šafranko joined his two fellow countrymen: young defensive midfielder Filip Lesniak, a grandson of then Slovakia national team's coach Ján Kozák and a former international Jakub Sylvestr. In his first fixture, he made it to the starting line-up immediately, playing against Aarhus in a goal-less tie on 26 August 2017. Despite the fact that he played mostly as a center-forward, Šafranko only scored two goals in 28 games and his play-time dropped as the season progressed.

=== Loan at Dundee United ===
Consequently, after the initial rounds of 2018–19 season, Šafranko was sent on a loan to Scottish Championship side, Dundee United. In Scotland, Šafranko made a notable impression soon after his arrival. He scored the second goal in a 2–1 win, in his debut match, against Queen of the South and before the end of the calendar year, he scored 7 further goals, most in September and October. Even in 2019, Šafranko continued to be fruitful, scoring 6 further goals (2 in the SFA Cup), some in the final decisive rounds of the main part of the season, which saw Dundee United finish second, 6 points behind Ross County, but managing to qualify to the Premiership relegation play-off. In March 2019, Šafranko was called up for first competitive fixtures of Slovak national team, after his performances and made a competitive debut too. In May's play-offs, Dundee United managed to overcome Inverness in the semi-finals, with Šafranko scoring one of four goals in the two-leg fixture. However, in the final of the play-off against St. Mirren after, two goal-less times, in the decisive penalty shoot-out, Šafranko's penalty was saved by Václav Hladký and Dundee United lost the shoot-out 3–1. Before the play-offs Šafranko had stated, that he intends to win a promotion for Dundee United.

After the season concluded, it was reported that Scottish Premiership's leading sides have shown interest in Šafranko, who tallied a total of 15 goals in 40 games in the season, with Rangers and Aberdeen being named. The latter were apparently prepared to offer a transfer during the winter transfer window, however as Šafranko had already played for Aalborg and Dundee United that season, he would have been ineligible to play. Nonetheless, after this successful season, it was reported that Aalborg had requested a transfer fee of £1m, as Šafranko was still bound by a year of contract.

=== Sepsi OSK Sfântu Gheorghe ===
On 1 August 2019 AaB announced, that they had sold Šafranko to Romanian Sepsi OSK.

=== Sabah ===
On 9 July 2024, Šafranko signed two-year contract with Sabah.

== International career ==
Šafranko was first called up to the senior national team for two friendly fixtures held in Abu Dhabi, UAE, in January 2017 versus Uganda and Sweden. Safranko made his debut versus Uganda, being fielded in the 85th minute, when he substituted Filip Oršula. Slovakia went on to lose the game 3–1. Šafranko also played the initial 60 minutes of Slovak 6–0 defeat to Sweden on 12 January 2017 before being replaced by another striker Tomáš Malec.

Šafranko's first call-up for a competitive international fixture came over two years later, when he was nominated by Pavel Hapal, on 12 March 2019, for a double UEFA Euro 2020 qualifying fixture against Hungary and Wales. He was nominated to replace Adam Nemec, who was a long-term center-forward in the national team, but retired from international football earlier in February 2019. He was fielded in the first match against Hungary, on 21 March 2019, in Trnava, marking his competitive debut in the Slovak senior national team. He was fielded in the 88th minute, when he replaced Ondrej Duda, who scored the first goal of the match in 42nd minute and assisted Rusnák's goal in the 85th minute. Slovakia won the match 2–0. Šafranko however did not play in Slovakia's 0–1 away loss to Wales.

== Career statistics ==
As of match played on 3 May 2024

Appearances and goals by club, season and competition
Club	Season	League			National cup (Note: Includes Slovak Cup, Danish Cup, Scottish Cup, Cupa României, Nedbank Cup)		Continental		Other		Total	
Club	Season	Division	Apps	Goals	Apps	Goals	Apps	Goals	Apps	Goals	Apps	Goals
Tatran Prešov	2013–14	2. Liga	18	0	2	0	—		—		20	0
Tatran Prešov	2014–15	2. Liga	21	11	1	0	—		—		22	11
Tatran Prešov	2015–16	2. Liga	15	6	2	3	—		—		17	9
Tatran Prešov	Total		54	17	5	3	—		—		59	20
Železiarne Podbrezová (loan)	2015–16	Fortuna Liga	14	1	0	0	—		—		14	1
Železiarne Podbrezová (loan)	2016–17	Fortuna Liga	18	4	2	0	—		—		20	4
Železiarne Podbrezová (loan)	Total		32	5	2	0	—		—		34	5
DAC 1904	2016–17	Fortuna Liga	12	6	1	0	—		—		13	6
DAC 1904	2017–18	Fortuna Liga	4	0	0	0	—		—		4	0
DAC 1904	Total		16	6	1	0	—		—		17	6
AaB	2017–18	Danish Superliga	28	2	2	0	—		—		30	2
AaB	2018–19	Danish Superliga	2	0	0	0	—		—		2	0
AaB	Total		30	2	2	0	—		—		32	2
Dundee United (loan)	2018–19	Scottish Championship	33	12	3	2	—		4 (Note: Appearances in Scottish Premiership play-offs)	1	40	15
Sepsi OSK	2019–20	Liga I	34	8	4	0	—		—		38	8
Sepsi OSK	2020–21	Liga I	33	9	1	0	—		1 (Note: Appearance in Liga I play-offs for UEFA Europa Conference League)	0	35	9
Sepsi OSK	Total		67	17	5	0	—		1	0	73	17
Mamelodi Sundowns	2021–22	South African Premier Division	16	5	4	3	5 (Note: Appearances in CAF Champions League)	0	3 (Note: Appearances in MTN 8)	1	28	9
Sepsi OSK	2022–23	Liga I	30	5	6	2	—		—		36	7
Sepsi OSK	2023–24	Liga I	36	8	3	0	6 (Note: Appearances in UEFA Europa Conference League)	0	1 (Note: Appearance in Supercupa României)	0	46	8
Sepsi OSK	Total		66	13	9	2	6	0	1	0	82	15
Career total			314	77	31	10	11	0	9	2	365	89

=== International ===
As of match played on 11 November 2020

Appearances and goals by national team and year
National team	Year	Apps	Goals
Slovakia	2017	2	0
Slovakia	2018	0	0
Slovakia	2019	4	0
Slovakia	2020	4	0
Total		10	0

== Honours ==
Mamelodi Sundowns

- South African Premier Division: 2021–22
- Nedbank Cup: 2021–22
- MTN 8: 2021

Sepsi OSK

- Cupa României: 2022–23
- Supercupa României: 2023

Sabah

- Azerbaijan Premier League: 2025–26
- Azerbaijan Cup: 2024–25
