= Andreas Blomqvist (footballer) =

Swedish footballer (born 1992)

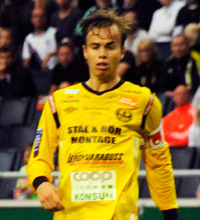
- Blomqvist with Mjällby AIF in 2013

Personal information
- Full name: Peter Andreas Blomqvist
- Date of birth: 5 May 1992 (age 34)
- Place of birth: Sölvesborg, Sweden
- Height: 1.82 m (5 ft 11 1/2 in)
- Position: Midfielder

Team information
- Current team: FK Karlskrona

Youth career
- Högadals IS

Senior career*
Years	Team	Apps	(Gls)
2011–2014	Mjällby AIF	67	(10)
2015	AaB	1	(0)
2016–2020	IFK Norrköping	56	(4)
2021–2022	Mjällby AIF	38	(0)
2022–	FK Karlskrona		

International career^{‡}
2012–2014	Sweden U21	8	(0)
2014	Sweden	2	(0)
- * Club domestic league appearances and goals as of 22 June 2023 ‡ National team caps and goals as of 23 January 2015

Andreas Blomqvist (born 5 May 1992) is a Swedish footballer who plays for the Swedish football club FK Karlskrona as a midfielder.
