= Jannik Pohl =

Danish footballer (born 1996)

Personal information
- Full name: Jannik Pohl
- Date of birth: 6 April 1996 (age 30)
- Place of birth: Hjørring, Denmark
- Height: 1.83 m (6 ft 0 in)
- Position: Forward

Youth career
- Hundelev Boldklub
- GVL Løkken
- FC Hjørring
- 2011–2015: AaB

Senior career*
Years	Team	Apps	(Gls)
2015–2018	AaB	64	(11)
2018–2020	Groningen	7	(1)
2019	→ Horsens (loan)	8	(0)
2020–2021	Horsens	22	(3)
2022–2024	Fram Reykjavík	31	(10)
2025	1. FC Phönix Lübeck	1	(0)
2025	Hillerød	1	(0)

International career
2011–2012	Denmark U16	3	(0)
2012	Denmark U17	5	(0)
2013	Denmark U18	2	(0)
2014–2015	Denmark U19	15	(3)
2016	Denmark U20	4	(2)
2017–2018	Denmark U21	4	(1)
- * Club domestic league appearances and goals as of 7 December 2025

Jannik Pohl (born 6 April 1996) is a Danish professional footballer who plays as a forward.

== Club career ==
=== AaB ===
Pohl started his youth career in Hundelev and Vendsyssel FF (formerly FC Hjørring), and joined the AaB youth team in 2011 at the age of 15.

During the pre-season for 2015–16 Pohl, together with teammates Oliver Abildgaard, was promoted from the U-19 team to the senior team. Sports Director of AaB, Allan Gaarde publicly praised Pohl as a promising striker who most likely would get his breakthrough to the first team within his first season.

Pohl made his first team Danish Superliga debut on 1 April 2016 against FC Nordsjælland. and scored his first senior goal against Odense BK in the last round of the Danish Superliga 2015–16 season.

=== Groningen ===
Pohl joined FC Groningen on 29 August 2018. After playing only 8 games for the club in the 2018–19 season, he was loaned out on the transfer deadline day, 2 September 2019, to AC Horsens for the rest of 2019.

=== Horsens ===
On 30 January 2020, after returning from his loan deal, Groningen terminated his contract, meaning that he became a free agent. Horsens signed him on a permanent contract the same day. On 23 November 2021 Pohl confirmed, that he would leave Horsens at the end of the year, where his contract was expiring.

=== Fram Reykjavík ===
On 29 March 2022, Pohl joined Icelandic club Fram Reykjavík.

=== 1. FC Phönix Lübeck ===
On 4 February 2025, Pohl moved to German Regionalliga Nord club 1. FC Phönix Lübeck. Just 15 days later, Pohl was diagnosed with a herniated disc in his lower back that would keep him out for 4 months, so the parties agreed to terminate the collaboration.

=== Hillerød ===
On 9 October 2025, Pohl joined Danish 1st Division side Hillerød on a short-term contract until the end of the year. Making only one appearance for the club, he left again at the end of the year.

== Career statistics ==
As of matches played 16 May 2018

Club	Season	League			Cup		Total	
Club	Season	Division	Apps	Goals	Apps	Goals	Apps	Goals
AaB	2015–16	Danish Superliga	7	1	5	2	12	3
AaB	2016–17	Danish Superliga	19	1	3	1	22	2
AaB	2017–18	Danish Superliga	30	8	5	1	35	9
AaB	2018–19	Danish Superliga	6	1	0	0	6	1
Career total			62	11	13	4	75	15
