= Jakob Blåbjerg =

Danish footballer (born 1995)

Personal information
- Full name: Jakob Blåbjerg Mathiasen
- Date of birth: 11 January 1995 (age 31)
- Place of birth: Aalborg, Denmark
- Height: 1.80 m (5 ft 11 in)
- Position: Centre back

Youth career
- Vejgaard
- AaB

Senior career*
Years	Team	Apps	(Gls)
2012–2020	AaB	110	(6)
2019–2020	→ Vendsyssel (loan)	25	(0)
Total		135	(6)

International career
2010–2011	Denmark U16	7	(1)
2011–2012	Denmark U17	12	(0)
2012	Denmark U18	2	(0)
2013–2014	Denmark U19	10	(0)
2013–2014	Denmark U20	3	(0)
2015–2017	Denmark U21	23	(0)
2016	Denmark U23	4	(0)
- * Club domestic league appearances and goals

Jakob Blåbjerg Mathiasen (born 11 January 1995) is a Danish former professional footballer who played as a defender.

== Youth career ==
Blåbjerg joined AaB as a U14 player from Vejgaard BK.

== Club career ==
=== AaB ===
In September 2012, Blåbjerg signed his first full-time contract and was to be promoted to the first team squad from the summer 2013. He got his Superliga debut for AaB in February 2013 against Silkeborg IF alongside Kasper Pedersen, as the four regular options for the centre-back position were all out with either injuries or bans. Blåbjerg was promoted to the first team squad in the summer 2013 at the age of 18, but did not play any games the whole season while AaB won the league and the Danish Cup.

In the following season Blåbjerg played 7 league matches in the first half year and 11 matches in the second half of the season. His performances were rewarded with a contract extension in the summer, which would keep him in the club until 2018. He was mostly used as a fullback.

In the 2015–16 season played 26 league matches. In the 2016–17 season he made 22 league appearances.

==== Loan to Vendsyssel ====
On 2 September 2019, Blåbjerg was loaned out to Vendsyssel FF for the 2019–20 season.

On 25 July 2020, 25-year old Blåbjerg confirmed, that he would retire with immediate effect. Blåbjerg told media that he planned to travel around Europe and afterwards continue studying.

== Personal life ==
Blåbjerg studied energy on bachelor's degree at Aalborg University and studied to become an engineer. Aalborg University had a collaboration with AaB, so when Blåbjerg was in Dubai with the Danish U21 national team, he took an exam through his computer.

== Honours ==
=== Club ===
AaB

- Danish Superliga: 2013–14
- Danish Cup: 2013–14
