= Morten Rokkedal =

Danish footballer (born 1997)

Personal information
- Full name: Morten Rokkedal Kristensen
- Date of birth: 10 October 1997 (age 29)
- Place of birth: Denmark
- Position: Centre-back

Team information
- Current team: Løgstør IF
- Number: 3

Youth career
- Løgstør IF
- Farsø/Ullits IK
- AaB

Senior career*
Years	Team	Apps	(Gls)
2016–2017	AaB	1	(0)
2017	→ Thisted (loan)	3	(0)
2018–	Løgstør IF		

International career
2012	Denmark U-16	1	(0)
2013	Denmark U-17	10	(0)
2014–2015	Denmark U-18	5	(0)
2015–2016	Denmark U-19	11	(1)
2016	Denmark U-20	2	(0)
- * Club domestic league appearances and goals

Morten Rokkedal Kristensen (born 10 October 1997) is a Danish footballer, who plays for amateur club Løgstør IF.

== Club career ==
=== AaB ===
On 29 May 2016, Rokkedal got his professional and Superliga debut for AaB, in a match against OB. He was in the line up and played the whole match.

On 10 June 2016 it was announced, that Rokkedal was promoted to the senior squad. He left the club at the end of his contract, which expired on 31 December 2017.

==== Loan to Thisted FC ====
Rokkedal didn't play a single game for AaB in the 2016/17 season, and was loaned out in the summer 2017 for the upcoming season.

=== Løgstør IF ===
After leaving AaB, Rokkedal joined his childhood-club Løgstør IF. Rokkedal was named Player of the Year at Løgstør in 2019.
