= Filip Lesniak =

Slovak footballer (born 1996)

Personal information
- Full name: Filip Lesniak
- Date of birth: 14 May 1996 (age 30)
- Place of birth: Košice, Slovakia
- Height: 1.76 m (5 ft 9 in)
- Position: Defensive midfielder

Team information
- Current team: Kolding
- Number: 4

Youth career
- Košice
- 2012–2016: Tottenham Hotspur

Senior career*
Years	Team	Apps	(Gls)
2016–2017	Tottenham Hotspur	1	(0)
2016	→ Slovan Liberec (loan)	1	(0)
2017–2020	AaB	39	(2)
2019–2020	→ Silkeborg IF (loan)	32	(0)
2020–2023	Wisła Płock	93	(2)
2024	Telavi	18	(0)
2024–2025	Spartak Varna	35	(0)
2025–	Kolding	24	(0)

International career
2013–2015	Slovakia U17	4	(0)
2015–2016	Slovakia U19	6	(1)
2016–2018	Slovakia U21	9	(0)
- * Club domestic league appearances and goals as of 2 June 2026

Filip Lesniak (born 14 May 1996) is a Slovak professional footballer who plays as a midfielder for Danish 1st Division club Kolding IF.

== Career ==
=== Tottenham Hotspur ===
Lesniak started his football career at FC VSS Košice in Slovakia before joining the Tottenham Hotspur youth academy in January 2012. After progressing through the ranks of the Tottenham Hotspur Academy, Lesniak signed his first professional contract with the club in July 2014.

At the start of the 2016-17 season Lesniak signed a loan move to Slovan Liberec in the Czech Republic. On 31 July 2016 he made his football league debut against FK Mladá Boleslav. Lesniak only made two more appearances for Liberec a debut in European football Europa League qualifying round against Admira Wacker Mödling and one domestic cup match. He returned to Tottenham on 31 December 2016.

He made his Premier League debut on 18 May 2017 against Leicester City, providing an assist to Harry Kane who completed his fourth hat-trick of the season. He had been released by Tottenham Hotspur along with 5 other academy players after the expiry of his contract on 9 June 2017.

=== Aalborg BK ===
Lesniak moved to Danish Superliga side AaB on 4 July 2017, signing a three-year contract. Upon joining the club, Lesniak was joined up by his compatriot Jakub Sylvestr.

Lesniak made his Aalborg BK debut, coming on as a second-half substitute for Magnus Christensen, in a 4-1 loss against SønderjyskE in the second game of the season.

On 12 July 2019, he was loaned out to Silkeborg IF until the end of the season.

=== Wisła Płock ===
On 29 July 2020, he joined Polish club Wisła Płock. On 6 February 2024, he left Wisła by mutual consent.

=== Telavi ===
On 15 February 2024, Erovnuli Liga club Telavi announced the signing of eleven new players, including Lesniak.

=== Spartak Varna ===
In July 2024, he signed a contract with newly promoted Bulgarian First League club Spartak Varna.

=== Kolding IF ===
On transfer deadline day, September 1, 2025, Estrada transferred to the Danish 1st Division club Kolding IF. The club did not disclose the duration of the contract.

== International career ==
Lesinak represented Slovakia U17, having played in UEFA European Under-17 Championship and FIFA U-17 World Cup, and Slovakia U19.

In March 2016, Lesinak was called up by Slovakia U21 and made his debut, in a 4–0 win over Estonia U21.

== Career statistics ==
As of match played 11 May 2024

Appearances and goals by club, season and competition
Club	Season	League			National Cup		Other		Total	
Club	Season	Division	Apps	Goals	Apps	Goals	Apps	Goals	Apps	Goals
Tottenham Hotspur	2016–17	Premier League	1	0	0	0	0	0	1	0
Slovan Liberec (loan)	2016–17	Fortuna Liga	1	0	1	0	1 (Note: Appearance in the Europa League)	0	3	0
AaB	2017–18	Superligaen	31	1	3	0	0	0	34	1
AaB	2018–19	Superligaen	8	0	2	0	0	0	10	0
AaB	Total		39	1	5	0	0	0	44	1
Silkeborg	2019–20	Superligaen	32	0	4	1	—		36	1
Wisła Płock	2020–21	Ekstraklasa	26	1	2	0	—		28	1
Wisła Płock	2021–22	Ekstraklasa	26	1	1	0	—		27	1
Wisła Płock	2022–23	Ekstraklasa	29	0	2	0	—		31	0
Wisła Płock	2023–24	I liga	12	0	1	0	—		13	0
Wisła Płock	Total		93	2	4	0	–		97	2
Telavi	2024	Erovnuli Liga	13	0	0	0	—		13	0
Career total			231	3	16	1	1	0	251	4

== Personal life ==
Lesniak' grandfather, Ján Kozák, was a national player. He has 55 caps for Czechoslovakia and was also head coach of Slovakia. His uncle is Ján Kozák jr.
