= Frederik Børsting =

Danish footballer (born 1995)

Personal information
- Full name: Frederik Lindbøg Børsting
- Date of birth: 13 February 1995 (age 31)
- Place of birth: Klarup, Denmark
- Height: 1.78 m (5 ft 10 in)
- Position: Midfielder

Team information
- Current team: AaB
- Number: 25

Youth career
- RKG Klarup
- AaB

Senior career*
Years	Team	Apps	(Gls)
2014–2022	AaB	208	(17)
2022–2023	Brann	58	(9)
2024–2025	Vendsyssel	41	(3)
2025–	AaB	25	(0)

International career
2014–2016	Denmark U19	5	(1)
2015	Denmark U20	1	(0)
2015–2017	Denmark U21	22	(2)
2016	Denmark Olympic	4	(0)
- * Club domestic league appearances and goals as of 2 June 2026

Frederik Lindbøg Børsting (Danish pronunciation: [ˈpɶɐ̯ste̝ŋ]; born 13 February 1995) is a Danish professional footballer who plays for Danish 1st Division side AaB.

== Club career ==
=== AaB ===
Børsting played for RKG Klarup until he was 12 years old, before joining AaB. He was promoted to the first team in the summer 2014. He got his Danish Superliga debut on 26 July 2014 when he was in the line-up against FC Midtjylland. Børsting was surprised over all the time he got in his first season at the first team. He played 19 league games and two Europe League games in his first season, which the player hadn't expected.

He quickly became a profile for both AaB and the Danish U21 national team. After a great 2015/16 season, he extended his contract in March 2016 until 2019. Following his extension, he was part of the Denmark team at the 2016 Olympics and played all four matches until Denmark was eliminated in the quarter final.

=== Brann ===
On 15 February 2022 AaB confirmed, that Børsting would join Norwegian club SK Brann with effect from 1 July 2022, when his contract with AaB expired. However, the deal was accelerated when Brann confirmed on 9 March 2022 that Børsting would instead move to the club with immediate effect for a fee around 1,5 million DKK.

=== Vendsyssel FF ===
On 28 January 2024, Børsting returned to Denmark, signing with Danish 1st Division side Vendsyssel FF on a deal until June 2026.

=== Back in AaB ===
On 10 June 2025, after being relegated with Vendsyssel, Børsting moved to AaB, where he had been playing before for several years.
