= Kasper Pedersen =

Danish footballer (born 1993)

Personal information
- Full name: Kasper Pedersen
- Date of birth: 13 January 1993 (age 33)
- Place of birth: Aabybro, Denmark
- Height: 1.85 m (6 ft 1 in)
- Position: Centre back

Team information
- Current team: No club

Youth career
- Aabybro
- –2004: Jetsmark
- 2004–2013: AaB

Senior career*
| Years | Team | Apps | (Gls) |
| 2013–2021 | AaB | 144 | (13) |
| 2021 | Esbjerg | 12 | (1) |
| 2021–2025 | Stabæk | 102 | (6) |
- * Club domestic league appearances and goals as of 13 April 2026

Kasper Pedersen (born 13 January 1993) is a Danish professional footballer who plays as a defender.

== Club career ==
Pedersen started his youth career at Aabybro IF, before moving to Jetsmark IF – a club affiliated with Aalborg Boldspilklub (AaB). At the age of 12, he joined the AaB youth team. He made his senior debut for the reserve team in the Denmark Series, the fourth tier of Danish football.

In the spring of 2013, he made his first team debut in the Danish Superliga, where he also scored his first official goal as a senior.

In the 2015–16 pre-season, Kasper signed a 4-year contract with AaB in which he was considered a permanent replacement for defender Rasmus Thelander, who was sold to Greek Panathinaikos on the same day.

On 15 January 2021, Pedersen joined Danish 1st Division club Esbjerg fB on a deal until June 2023. On 26 July 2021, his contract was terminated by mutual agreement. The following day, Pedersen signed with Norwegian club Stabæk Fotball. Pedersen left Stabæk in November 2025.

== Club statistics ==
As of Statistics updated 23 February 2019.

| Club | Season | National Division | | | Danish Cup | | EL Qualification | | Total | |
| Club | Season | Division | Apps | Goals | Apps | Goals | Apps | Goals | Apps | Goals |
|---|---|---|---|---|---|---|---|---|---|---|
| AaB | 2012-13 | Danish Superliga | 3 | 1 | 0 | 0 | 0 | 0 | 3 | 1 |
| AaB | 2013–14 | Danish Superliga | 3 | 1 | 3 | 0 | 1 | 0 | 7 | 1 |
| AaB | 2014–15 | Danish Superliga | 18 | 1 | 2 | 0 | 0 | 0 | 20 | 1 |
| AaB | 2015–16 | Danish Superliga | 27 | 1 | 6 | 1 | 0 | 0 | 33 | 2 |
| AaB | 2016–17 | Danish Superliga | 25 | 2 | 1 | 0 | 0 | 0 | 26 | 2 |
| AaB | 2017–18 | Danish Superliga | 27 | 2 | 2 | 0 | 0 | 0 | 29 | 2 |
| AaB | 2018–19 | Danish Superliga | 16 | 3 | 2 | 0 | 0 | 0 | 18 | 3 |
| Career total | | | 119 | 11 | 16 | 1 | 1 | 0 | 136 | 12 |

== Honours ==
=== Club ===
AaB

- Danish Superliga (1): 2013–14
- Danish Cup (1): 2013–14
