= Kasper Risgård =

Danish footballer (born 1983)

Personal information
- Full name: Kasper Winde Risgård
- Date of birth: 4 January 1983 (age 43)
- Place of birth: Aalborg, Denmark
- Height: 1.82 m (5 ft 11 1/2 in)
- Position: Midfielder

Youth career
- AaB

Senior career*
Years	Team	Apps	(Gls)
2002–2009	AaB	116	(13)
2004	→ Nordjylland (loan)	9	(0)
2009–2010	Arminia Bielefeld	24	(3)
2010–2011	Panionios	3	(0)
2011–2013	Silkeborg IF	63	(12)
2013–2019	AaB	165	(24)

International career
2003–2004	Denmark U20	3	(0)
- * Club domestic league appearances and goals as of 13 June 2019

Kasper Winde Risgård (born 4 January 1983) is a Danish retired footballer who played as a midfielder.

== Career ==
=== AaB ===
Risgård was introduced to top flight football late in the 2002–03 season when AaB surprisingly found themselves struggling in the bottom of the table. Risgård made some fine displays, including a goal in the DONG Cup semifinal against Brøndby IF and a vital winner against Køge BK.

During the next seasons, Risgård fell further away from the team and was eventually loaned out to local rivals FC Nordjylland. When he returned to AaB, he remained a substitute but due to many injuries, Risgård got a new chance as central defender in the end of the 2005–06 season, where he played well for half a year before being moved once again in the fall of 2007. This time Aalborg BK coach Erik Hamrén moved him to a position as a defensive midfielder, where he proved himself an important first team player. Due to a series of impressive performances as a defensive midfielder in both the Danish Superliga and the UEFA Cup Danish national coach Morten Olsen brought him into the Danish national league squad.

=== Bielefeld ===
On 9 June 2009, Risgård signed a three-year deal with German 2. Bundesliga club Arminia Bielefeld on a free transfer. Here he joined up with fellow dane, Jonas Kamper. On 4 December 2009, Risgård scored his first goal for the club in a 2–3 defeat against Fortuna Düsseldorf.

=== Panionios ===
On 31 August 2010, Risgård signed a two-year deal with Super League club Panionios He was released from his contract with Panionios in February 2011, as Paninios didn't pay his wages for four months.

=== Silkeborg IF ===
On 1 March 2011, Risgård signed a two-year deal with the Danish Superliga club Silkeborg IF. As the transfer took place outside the transfer window, the contract had to be approved by UEFA, before he could play for Silkeborg IF.

=== AaB ===
On 19 July 2013, Risgård signed a one-year deal with his childhood club AaB. On 29 January 2014 the contract was extended with two more years. Risgård retired at the end of the 2018/19 season.

== Honours ==
=== Club ===
AaB

- Danish Superliga (2): 2007–08, 2013–14
- Danish Cup (1): 2013–14
