= Allan Gaarde =

Danish footballer (born 1975)

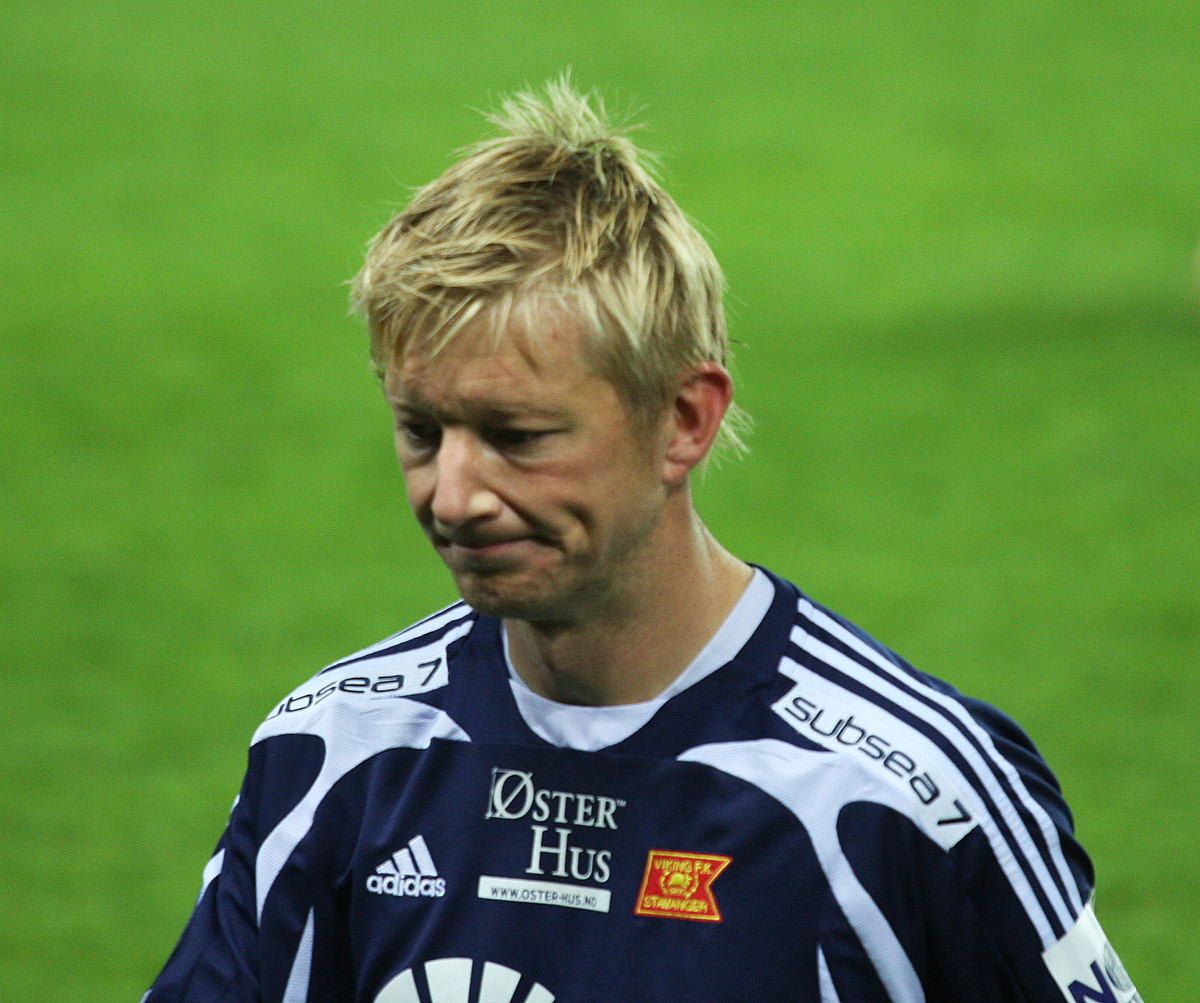
- Gaarde playing for Viking

Personal information
- Date of birth: 25 January 1975 (age 51)
- Place of birth: Grindsted, Denmark
- Height: 1.95 m (6 ft 5 in)
- Position: Midfielder

Youth career
- Grindsted
- Vejle
- Grindsted
- Vejen

Senior career*
Years	Team	Apps	(Gls)
1997–2000	AaB	109	(22)
2001–2002	Udinese	8	(0)
2002–2005	AaB	77	(17)
2005–2008	Viking	81	(14)
2009–2010	Vejle	24	(7)
Total		299	(60)

Managerial career
- 2013–2019: AaB (Sports director)
- * Club domestic league appearances and goals

Allan Gaarde (born 25 January 1975) is a Danish former professional football player in the midfielder position, who played 227 games and scored 48 goals for AaB, and won the 1999 Danish Superliga championship with the club. He also played abroad for Italian club Udinese and Norwegian club Viking FK, before ending his career with Vejle in Denmark.

Gaarde usually played on the left of midfield, and his main assets were his technique, vision, distribution and heading.

Gaarde was sports director in AaB from 2013 to 2019.

== Playing career ==
=== AaB and brief Udinese stint ===
Born in Grindsted, Gaarde started playing with a local amateur club at the age of five. He played youth football with Vejle, but did not like the atmosphere in the team, and decided to end his dream of a professional career at the age of 16. He returned to amateur football in Grindsted. At the age of 20, Gaarde was poised to start an academic education, when an offer from lower-league Denmark Series club Vejen prompted him to reignite his footballing career instead. He helped the club win promotion for the Danish 2nd Division, and was approached by a number of Danish clubs in the Summer 1997.

He turned professional at the age of 22, as he signed a contract with top-flight club AaB before the 1997–98 Superliga season. He was signed to replace retired defender Ib Simonsen, though Gaarde made it clear that his favoured position was in midfield. Gaarde had a remarkable start at Aalborg BK. In the 1997 UEFA Intertoto Cup, the club lost a game 8–2 to Dutch club SC Heerenveen, and Gaarde was promptly moved to the midfield. In his Superliga debut on 27 July 1997, Gaarde was sent off in a 0–0 draw with Odense BK. Despite the negatives, Gaarde quickly established himself in the team, as he played 31 of 33 league games and scored six goals in his first season with Aalborg BK. One of his most remarkable games came in a game against Vejle Boldklub in October 1998. Aalborg was down 2–0 when Gaarde came on as a substitute in the 60th minute and promptly scored a hat-trick in nine minutes to help Aalborg win 4–2. He played 31 of 33 games and scored eight goals in the 1998–99 Superliga season, as Aalborg BK won the second championship in club history. He played a total 109 league games and scored 22 goals for Aalborg BK from 1997 to 2000.

While at Aalborg BK, Gaarde had played four games in the UEFA Cup and UEFA Intertoto Cup tournaments against Italian club Udinese, who had not been able to handle his awkward playing style. In December 2000, Gaarde was bought by Udinese Calcio under manager Roy Hodgson. He made his Serie A debut on 7 January 2001, in a 3–1 defeat to Perugia. While at Udinese, Gaarde was sent off during a game without even playing. Hodgson soon left the club, and Gaarde did not find playing success at Udinese. He suffered from injuries, and only played eight league games in the Serie A championship.

In February 2002, he had a trial with Scottish side Livingston but was not offered a permanent deal. He moved back to Aalborg BK in spring 2002, and played his come-back game for Aalborg BK in May 2002. In June 2005, Gaarde played his last Superliga game for the club. He played a combined total of 227 games and scored 48 goals in all competitions for Aalborg BK.

=== Viking ===
Gaarde moved to Norwegian club Viking, once again playing under Roy Hodgson. Though Hodgson soon left the club, Gaarde was a success at Viking, and scored four goals in his first 13 games for the club. He was named team captain. When Gaarde suffered an injury in 2007, fellow Dane Nicolai Stokholm took over the role as captain. Gaarde played a combined total of 136 games and scored 25 goals in all competitions for Viking FK.

=== Vejle ===
In January 2009, he moved back to Denmark to play for relegation battlers Vejle in the Danish Superliga. In his debut game for Vejle, Gaarde was sent off in a 1–1 draw with FC Nordsjælland. He played 11 of the last 16 games of the 2008–09 Superliga, scoring one goal, but Gaarde could not keep Vejle from being relegated at the end of the season. He stayed with the club in the secondary Danish 1st Division, but suffered a knee injury and ended his career in February 2010.

== Post-playing career ==
Three years later in 2013 Gaarde became sports director in his old club AaB. With Gaarde as sports director AaB won the Danish Superliga and the Danish Cup in 2014. It was first time in history that the club secured The Double. Gaarde was also the man behind the biggest sale in the history of AaB when Christian Bassogog made a transfer from AaB to Chinese Henan Jianye.

== Honours ==
=== As player ===
AaB

- Danish Superliga: 1998–99

=== As sports director ===
AaB

- Danish Superliga: 2013–14
- Danish Cup: 2013–14
