= 2016–17 Odense Boldklub season =

Odense Boldklub
2016–17 season
- Chairman: Niels Thorborg
- Manager: Kent Nielsen
- Stadium: TRE-FOR Park
- Danish Superliga: 11th (Regular season); 2nd (Play-off)
- Danish Cup: Third round
- Top goalscorer: League: Rasmus Jönsson (8 goals); All: Rasmus Jönsson (10 goals)
- Highest home attendance: 10,778
- Lowest home attendance: 3,452
- Average home league attendance: 5,376
Home colours	Away colours

The 2016–17 Odense Boldklub season was the club's 128th season, and their 55th appearance in the Danish Superliga. As well as the Superliga, the side were also competing in the DBU Pokalen. After a bad start to the season, they finished strong in the regular season as 11th. With a strong relegation round, they finished second and went forward in the European play-offs against Silkeborg IF.

== First team ==
Last updated on 31 January 2017

Squad no.	Name	Nationality	Position	Date of birth (age)
Goalkeepers
1	Michael Falkesgaard	(Denmark)	GK	9 April 1991 (aged 26)
13	Sten Grytebust	(Norway)	GK	25 October 1989 (aged 27)
Defenders
2	Kenneth Emil Petersen (captain)	(Denmark)	CB	15 January 1985 (aged 32)
3	Frederik Tingager	(Denmark)	CB	22 February 1993 (aged 24)
4	Ryan Johnson Laursen	(Denmark)	LB	14 April 1992 (aged 25)
5	João Pereira	(Portugal)	LB	10 May 1990 (aged 27)
6	Jeppe Tverskov	(Denmark)	CB	12 March 1993 (aged 24)
17	Jacob Buus	(Denmark)	CB	7 March 1997 (aged 20)
19	Mikkel Desler	(Denmark)	RB	19 February 1995 (aged 22)
20	Jacob Barrett Laursen	(Denmark)	LB	17 November 1994 (aged 22)
24	Oliver Lund	(Denmark)	RB	21 August 1990 (aged 26)
Midfielders
11	Casper Nielsen	(Denmark)	RM	29 April 1994 (aged 23)
14	Jens Jakob Thomasen	(Denmark)	CM	25 May 1996 (aged 21)
15	Izunna Uzochukwu	(Nigeria)	CM	11 April 1990 (aged 27)
18	Mathias Thrane	(Denmark)	LM	19 February 1995 (aged 22)
21	Mathias Greve	(Denmark)	RM	11 February 1995 (aged 22)
22	Nana Welbeck	(Ghana)	CM	24 November 1994 (aged 22)
Forwards
7	Jóan Símun Edmundsson	(Faroe Islands)	FW	26 July 1991 (aged 25)
9	Rasmus Jönsson	(Sweden)	FW	27 January 1990 (aged 27)
10	Rasmus Festersen	(Denmark)	FW	26 August 1986 (aged 30)
26	Yao Dieudonne	(Ivory Coast)	FW	14 May 1997 (aged 20)
28	Anders K. Jacobsen	(Denmark)	FW	27 October 1989 (aged 27)
29	Kristian Weber	(Denmark)	FW	3 January 1997 (aged 20)

== Transfers and loans ==
=== Transfers in ===
Entry date	Position	No.	Player	From club	Fee	Ref.
1 July 2016	FW	9	(Sweden) Rasmus Jönsson	(Denmark) Aalborg BK	Free transfer	
1 July 2016	LB	5	(Portugal) João Pereira	(Denmark) SønderjyskE	Free transfer	
1 July 2016	CB	2	(Denmark) Kenneth Emil Petersen	(Denmark) Aalborg BK	Free transfer	
1 July 2016	MF	18	(Denmark) Mathias Thrane	(Denmark) Aalborg BK	Free transfer	
1 July 2016	CB	6	(Denmark) Jeppe Tverskov	(Denmark) Randers FC	Free transfer	
3 August 2016	CM	22	(Ghana) Nana Welbeck	(Slovenia) NK Krka	2,200,000 DKK	
1 January 2017	FW	29	(Denmark) Kristian Weber	Youth academy		
Total					2,200,000 DKK	

=== Transfers out ===
Departure date	Position	No.	Player	To club	Fee	Ref.
30 June 2016	CM	18	(Bosnia and Herzegovina) Azer Bušuladžić	Unattached	End of contract	
30 June 2016	LB	6	(Guinea) Mohammed Diarra	Unattached	End of contract	
30 June 2016	FW	9	(Denmark) Rasmus Falk	(Denmark) F.C. Copenhagen	End of contract	
30 June 2016	GK	25	(Ukraine) Maksym Koval	(Ukraine) Dynamo Kyiv	End of loan	
30 June 2016	CB	5	(Denmark) Lasse Nielsen	(Poland) Lech Poznań	End of contract	
30 June 2016	CM	29	(Denmark) Anders Thomsen	Unattached	End of contract	
30 June 2016	GK	1	(Denmark) Michael Tørnes	Unattached	End of contract	
14 July 2016	RM	11	(Denmark) Lucas Jensen	(Denmark) Hobro IK	Free transfer	
18 July 2016	DF	22	(Iceland) Ari Skúlason	(Belgium) K.S.C. Lokeren	5,200,000 DKK	
6 January 2017	FW	23	(Denmark) Thomas Mikkelsen	(Scotland) Dundee United	Loan	
30 January 2017	MF	8	(Netherlands) Mohamed El Makrini	(Netherlands) Roda JC	1,115,000 DKK	
Total					6,315,000 DKK	

== Friendlies ==
=== Pre-season ===
29 June 2016 Friendly	Malmö (Sweden)	1–0	(Denmark) Odense	Malmö, Sweden
15:00 CEST	Kjartansson 78'	Report	Petersen (yellow card) 32'; Desler (yellow card) 88'	Stadium: Swedbank Stadion; Attendance: 1,461

6 July 2016 Friendly	Magdeburg (Germany)	1–1	(Denmark) Odense	Magdeburg, Germany
18:00 CEST	Beck 18' (pen.)	Report	Mikkelsen 81'	Stadium: Waldstadion; Attendance: 1,740

9 July 2016 Friendly	Eintr. Braunschweig (Germany)	3–3	(Denmark) Odense	Braunschweig, Germany
16:00 CEST	Abdullahi 39', 57'; Biada 85'	Report	Festersen 35'; Jönsson 49'; Dieudonne 72'	Stadium: Eintracht-Stadion; Attendance: 1,100

=== Winter break ===
20 January 2016 Friendly	Roskilde (Denmark)	0–2	(Denmark) Odense	Roskilde, Denmark
13:00 CEST		Report		Stadium: Roskilde Idrætspark

22 January 2016 Friendly	Odense (Denmark)	4–1	(Denmark) Nykøbing	Odense, Denmark
12:00 CEST		Report		Stadium: Tarup-Paarup Idrætspark

28 January 2016 Friendly	Helsingborg (Sweden)	1–0	(Denmark) Odense	Helsingborg, Sweden
13:00 CEST		Report		Stadium: Olympia

5 February 2016 Friendly	Zenit St. Petersburg (Russia)	1–1	(Denmark) Odense	Murcia, Spain
19:00 CEST		Report		Stadium: Pinatar Arena

8 February 2016 Friendly	Viktoria Plzeň (Czech Republic)	2–0	(Denmark) Odense	Madrid, Spain
16:00 CEST		Report		Stadium: La Finca Arena

12 February 2016 Friendly	Odense (Denmark)	2–3	(Denmark) HB Køge	Odense, Denmark
14:00 CEST		Report		Stadium: Tarup-Paarup Idrætsanlæg

== Competitions ==
=== Superliga ===
==== League table ====
Pos	Team	Pld	W	D	L	GF	GA	GD	Pts	Qualification
9	Silkeborg	26	7	9	10	31	46	−15	30	Qualification for the relegation round
10	Horsens	26	7	8	11	29	45	−16	29	Qualification for the relegation round
11	Odense	26	7	7	12	26	32	−6	28	Qualification for the relegation round
12	AGF	26	6	7	13	33	40	−7	25	Qualification for the relegation round
13	Viborg	26	6	7	13	29	40	−11	25	Qualification for the relegation round

Source: DBU, Soccerway
Rules for classification: 1) Points; 2) Goal difference; 3) Goals scored; 4) Away goals scored; 5) Play-off (played on neutral ground if determining teams for different rounds); 6) Draw.

==== Results summary ====
Overall								Home						Away					
Pld	W	D	L	GF	GA	GD	Pts	W	D	L	GF	GA	GD	W	D	L	GF	GA	GD
26	7	7	12	26	32	−6	28	5	2	6	14	11	+3	2	5	6	12	21	−9

Last updated: 19 March 2017.

==== Results by round ====
Matchday	1	2	3	4	5	6	7	8	9	10	11	12	13	14	15	16	17	18	19	20	21	22	23	24	25	26
Ground	H	A	A	H	H	A	H	A	H	A	A	H	A	H	A	H	H	A	H	A	A	H	A	H	H	A
Result	D	D	D	D	W	L	L	L	L	L	L	W	L	L	D	L	W	L	L	W	D	W	D	W	L	W
Position	9	7	8	8	8	8	10	10	10	12	13	13	13	13	13	13	12	12	13	12	13	13	13	11	12	11

Updated to match(es) played on 19 March 2017. Source: ob.dk
A = Away; H = Home; W = Win; D = Draw; L = Loss

==== Matches ====
Win Draw Loss

15 July 2016 1	Odense	0–0	Silkeborg	Odense
20:15 CEST	El Makrini (yellow card) 38'	Report	Flo (yellow card) 90+3'	Stadium: TRE-FOR Park; Attendance: 10,778; Referee: Michael Johansen

24 July 2016 2	Lyngby	2–2	Odense	Lyngby
14:00 CEST	Rasmussen (yellow card) 8'; Kjær 42', 51', (yellow card) 48'		Petersen 8' (pen.), (yellow card) 43' (yellow-red card) 90+4'; Festersen 38', (yellow card) 47'; Desler (yellow card) 79'	Stadium: Lyngby Stadion; Attendance: 2,006; Referee: Jørgen Daugbjerg Burchardt

1 August 2016 3	Aalborg	2–2	Odense	Aalborg
19:00 CEST	Bassogog 3'; Würtz 11'; Blåbjerg (yellow card) 27'	Report	Edmundsson 5', 77'; Tingager (yellow card) 44'	Stadium: Nordjyske Arena; Attendance: 7,227; Referee: Mads-Kristoffer Kristoffersen

6 August 2016 4	Odense	0–0	Viborg	Odense
16:00 CEST	Petersen (yellow card) 59'; Jacobsen (yellow card) 90'	Report	Grønning (yellow card) 43'	Stadium: TRE-FOR Park; Attendance: 4,488; Referee: Anders Poulsen

14 August 2016 5	Odense	3–1	Nordsjælland	Odense
16:00 CEST	Tverskov (yellow card) 42'; Mikkelsen 53', 82'; Petersen 57'	Report	Kohler (yellow card) 52'; Ingvartsen 81'	Stadium: TRE-FOR Park; Attendance: 4,634; Referee: Jørgen Daugbjerg Burchardt

22 August 2016 6	Esbjerg	3–2	Odense	Esbjerg
19:00 CEST	Andersen 31'; Hvilsom 50'; Paulsen 76'	Report	Festersen 12'; Edmundsson 53'; Jacobsen (yellow card) 82'	Stadium: Blue Water Arena; Attendance: 4,042; Referee: Jens Maae

28 August 2016 7	Odense	0–1	Horsens	Odense
14:00 CEST	Desler (yellow card) 45'; Jacobsen (yellow card) 90+4'	Report	Hansson 28'; Sanneh (yellow card) 35'; Gemmer (yellow card) 59'; Bjerregaard (yellow card) 89'	Stadium: TRE-FOR Park; Attendance: 4,199; Referee: Michael Tykgaard

10 September 2016 8	Copenhagen	2–0	Odense	Copenhagen
16:00 CEST	Jørgensen (yellow card) 81'; Augustinsson 87' (pen.); Cornelius 90'	Report	Edmundsson (yellow card) 73'; Uzochukwu (yellow card) 78'	Stadium: Telia Parken; Attendance: 14,219; Referee: Jakob Kehlet

18 September 2016 9	Odense	0–1	Midtjylland	Odense
14:00 CEST	Edmundsson (yellow card) 11'; Lund (yellow card) 50'; Festersen (yellow card) 74'; Mikkelsen (yellow card) 85'	Report	Hansen (yellow card) 51'; Halsti (yellow card) 53'; Olsson 75'	Stadium: TRE-FOR Park; Attendance: 6,520; Referee: Michael Johansen

22 September 2016 10	SønderjyskE	1–0	Odense	Haderslev
18:00 CEST	Kroon 11'; Pedersen (yellow card) 19'	Report	Petersen (yellow card) 21'; El Makrini (yellow card) 71' (yellow-red card) 85'; Tverskov (yellow card) 74'; Thrane (yellow card) 78'	Stadium: Sydbank Park; Attendance: 4,747; Referee: Jens Maae

25 September 2016 11	Brøndby	3–0	Odense	Copenhagen
16:00 CEST	Nørgaard 19'; Mukhtar 45+3'; Holst (yellow card) 75'; Pukki 77'; Hjulsager (yellow card) 82'	Report	Lund (yellow card) 8'; Tingager (yellow card) 68'	Stadium: Brøndby Stadium; Attendance: 13,147; Referee: Jørgen Daugbjerg Burchardt

30 September 2016 12	Odense	2–1	Aarhus	Odense
18:00 CEST	Welbeck (yellow card) 15'; Tingager 41'; Lund (yellow card) 69'; Jönsson 72'; Mikkelsen (yellow card) 78'; Grytebust (yellow card) 90+4'	Report	Juelsgård (yellow card) 22'; Pedersen (yellow card) 59'; Amini 78'; Bjarnason (yellow card) 90+3'; Mikanović (yellow card) 90+5'	Stadium: TRE-FOR Park; Attendance: 6,478; Referee: Michael Tykgaard

16 October 2016 13	Randers	3–0	Odense	Randers
13:00 CEST	George 9'; Fisker (yellow card) 56'; Ishak 62', 89'	Report	El Makrini (yellow card) 18'; Edmundsson (yellow card) 45+2'	Stadium: AutoC Park Randers; Attendance: 3,351; Referee: Sandi Putros

23 October 2016 14	Odense	0–3	Copenhagen	Odense
16:00 CEST	El Makrini (yellow card) 65'	Report	Cornelius (yellow card) 38'; Verbič 40'; Tingager 47' (o.g.); Delaney 77'	Stadium: EWII Park; Attendance: 5,825; Referee: Jakob Kehlet

28 October 2016 15	Silkeborg	1–1	Odense	Silkeborg
18:00 CEST	Gammelby 54'	Report	Thrane 11'; Welbeck (yellow card) 16'; Petersen (yellow card) 64'	Stadium: Mascot Park; Attendance: 2,412; Referee: Michael Tykgaard

6 November 2016 16	Odense	1–2	Lyngby	Odense
12:00 CEST	El Makrini (yellow card) 37'; Festersen (yellow card) 40'; Welbeck (yellow card) 44'; Pereira (yellow card) 57'; Edmundsson 63'	Report	Kjær 10', 80', (yellow card) 86'; Rygaard Jensen (yellow card) 30'; Nielsen (yellow card) 43'; Ojo (yellow card) 83'	Stadium: EWII Park; Attendance: 4,812; Referee: Morten Krogh

20 November 2016 17	Odense	1–0	Brøndby	Odense
16:00 CEST	Jacobsen 42'; Pereira (yellow card) 70'; El Makrini (yellow card) 76'; Dieudonne (yellow card) 90+2'	Report	Nørgaard (yellow card) 38'; Hjulsager (yellow card) 62'	Stadium: EWII Park; Attendance: 5,815; Referee: Jens Maae

28 November 2016 18	Midtjylland	1–0	Odense	Herning
19:00 CEST	Nissen 4'; Duelund (yellow card) 90+6'	Report	Edmundsson (yellow card) 79'	Stadium: MCH Arena; Attendance: 6,242; Referee: Jakob Kehlet

1 December 2016 19	Odense	0–1	Esbjerg	Odense
20:00 CEST	Tverskov (yellow card) 50'; El Makrini (yellow card) 76'	Report	Jørgensen 51' (pen.), (yellow card) 72'; Kristensen (yellow card) 84'	Stadium: EWII Park; Attendance: 3,836; Referee: Jens Maae

4 December 2016 20	Nordsjælland	0–1	Odense	Farum
14:00 CEST	Gregor (yellow card) 57'	Report	Greve (yellow card) 50'; Festersen 53', (yellow card) 71'; Laursen (yellow card) 72'	Stadium: Right to Dream Park; Attendance: 1,501; Referee: Jakob Kehlet

12 December 2016 21	Viborg	1–1	Odense	Viborg
19:00 CEST	Frederiksen 8'; Stankov (yellow card) 75'	Report	Thomasen 74'	Stadium: Viborg Stadion; Attendance: 3,710; Referee: Jakob Kehlet

20 February 2017 22	Odense	3–0	Randers	Odense
19:00 CEST	Edmundsson 24'; Jönsson 58', 76'; Uzochukwu (yellow card) 62'	Report	Lundberg (yellow card) 41'	Stadium: EWII Park; Attendance: 3,452; Referee: Anders Poulsen

25 February 2017 23	Horsens	1–1	Odense	Horsens
16:00 CEST	Hansson 6', (yellow card) 56'; Nielsen (yellow card) 80'	Report	Jönsson 58'; Thomasen (yellow card) 82'; Uzochukwu (yellow card) 90+4'	Stadium: CASA Arena Horsens; Attendance: 2,179; Referee: Jakob Kehlet

6 March 2017 24	Odense	4–0	Aalborg	Odense
19:00 CEST	Nielsen 27'; Edmundsson (yellow card) 38', (goal) 62', 80'; Jönsson 67'	Report	Würtz (yellow card) 22'	Stadium: EWII Park; Attendance: 3,962; Referee: Jens Maae

12 March 2017 25	Odense	0–1	SønderjyskE	Odense
13:00 CEST	Tingager (yellow card) 37'	Report	Pedersen 9'; Poulsen (yellow card) 45+1'; Ramón (yellow card) 64'; Rømer (yellow card) 68'; Ritter (yellow card) 84'; Uhre (yellow card) 90+6'	Stadium: EWII Park; Attendance: 5,910; Referee: Morten Krogh

19 March 2017 26	Aarhus	1–2	Odense	Aarhus
17:00 CEST	Khodzhaniyazov (yellow card) 33'; Spelmann (yellow card) 39'; Junker (yellow card) 68'; Rasmussen 90+3' (pen.)	Report	Petersen (yellow card) 67'; Tverskov (yellow card) 68'; Edmundsson 72', (yellow card) 80'; Tingager 74'	Stadium: Ceres Park; Attendance: 5,211; Referee: Peter Kjærsgaard-Andersen

==== Relegation round ====
Pos	Team	Pld	W	D	L	GF	GA	GD	Pts	Qualification or relegation
1	Randers	32	11	8	13	33	35	−2	41	Qualification for the European play-off quarter-finals
2	Odense	32	10	9	13	33	38	−5	39	Qualification for the European play-off quarter-finals
3	Horsens (O)	32	9	9	14	34	53	−19	36	Qualification for the relegation play-offs
4	Esbjerg (R)	32	6	12	14	32	54	−22	30	Qualification for the relegation play-offs

Source: Soccerway
Rules for classification: 1) Points; 2) Goal difference; 3) Goals scored; 4) Away goals scored; 5) Play-off.
(O) Play-off winners; (R) Relegated

31 March 2017 27	Horsens	0–0	Odense	Horsens
18:00 CEST	Kortegaard (yellow card) 32'; Hansson (yellow card) 59'; Jespersen (yellow card) 85'	Report	Tverskov (yellow card) 54'; Jönsson (yellow card) 61'	Stadium: CASA Arena Horsens; Attendance: 2,290; Referee: Peter Munch Larsen

7 April 2017 28	Odense	3–0	Esbjerg	Odense
18:00 CEST	Festersen 50' (pen.), 56'; Thomasen (yellow card) 67'; Jacobsen 89'	Report	Zivzivadze (yellow card) 44'; Jørgensen (yellow card) 49'; Mabil (yellow card) 54'; Katsikas (yellow card) 83'	Stadium: EWII Park; Attendance: 5,026; Referee: Morten Krogh

18 April 2017 29	Odense	1–0	Randers	Odense
18:15 CEST	Jönsson 17'; Tingager (red card) 31'	Report	Marxen (yellow card) 2'; Bager (yellow card) 16'	Stadium: EWII Park; Attendance: 4,449; Referee: Lars Christoffersen

23 April 2017 30	Randers	4–0	Odense	Randers
13:00 CEST	Tverskov 8' (o.g.); Fisker 20'; Lundberg (yellow card) 26'; Bager (yellow card) 41'; Fischer 43'; Pourié 51'; Fenger (yellow card) 90'	Report	Edmundsson (yellow card) 45+2'	Stadium: AutoC Park Randers; Attendance: 4,343; Referee: Sandi Putros

28 April 2017 31	Odense	2–1	Horsens	Odense
18:00 CEST	Greve 24'; Petersen (yellow card) 39'; Thomasen 90+4'	Report	Hansson (yellow card) 25'; Helgason 45+3', (yellow card) 52'; Tshiembe (yellow card) 49'	Stadium: EWII Park; Attendance: 5,836; Referee: Jørgen Daugbjerg Burchardt

8 May 2017 32	Esbjerg	1–1	Odense	Esbjerg
19:00 CEST	Mabil 8'; Brink (yellow card) 50'; Tsimikas (yellow card) 83'	Report	Edmundsson 14', (yellow card) 83'; Laursen (yellow card) 29'; Uzochukwu (yellow card) 53'	Stadium: Blue Water Arena; Attendance: 4,710; Referee: Peter Kjærsgaard-Andersen

=== European play-offs ===
==== Quarter-finals ====
13 May 2017 First leg	Odense	3–1	Silkeborg	Odense
16:00 CEST	Jönsson 18'; Greve 68'; Festersen 75'	Report	Helenius 34'	Stadium: EWII Park; Attendance: 4,805; Referee: Lars Christoffersen

16 May 2017 Second leg	Silkeborg	2–1	Odense	Silkeborg
18:00 CEST	Skov 51', 72'; Skhirtladze (yellow card) 89'	Report	Laursen (yellow card) 44'; Desler 70'; Tingager (red card) 90'	Stadium: Mascot Park; Attendance: 2,500; Referee: Michael Tykgaard

Odense won 4–3 on aggregate

==== Semi-finals ====
20 May 2017 First leg	Odense	1–1	Randers	Odense
16:00 CEST	Laursen (yellow card) 32'; Festersen (yellow card) 36'; Petersen (yellow card) 50' (yellow-red card) 51'; Jönsson 83'	Report	Allansson 54', (yellow card) 90+4'; Đurđić (yellow card) 90+4'	Stadium: EWII Park; Attendance: 4,447; Referee: Anders Poulsen

29 May 2017 Second leg	Randers	2–0	Odense	Randers
19:00 CEST	Bruhn (yellow card) 12'; Marxen (yellow card) 30'; Pourié 90'; Lundberg 90+4'	Report	Desler (yellow card) 6'; Tverskov (yellow card) 11'; Thomasen (yellow card) 32'; Nielsen (yellow card) 42'; Lund (yellow card) 54' (yellow-red card) 75'; Pereira (yellow card) 86'	Stadium: BioNutria Park Randers; Referee: Jørgen Daugbjerg Burchardt

Randers won 3–1 on aggregate

=== DBU Pokalen ===
Win Draw Loss

7 September 2016 Second round	Vejle	0–4	Odense	Vejle
20:15 CEST	Ba Loua (yellow card) 24'; Egholm (yellow card) 43'	Report	El Makrini (yellow card) 16'; Jönsson 28', 59'; Festersen 44'; Welbeck (yellow card) 79'; Mikkelsen 85'	Stadium: Vejle Stadion

19 October 2016 Third round	Vendsyssel	2–1	Odense	Hjørring
19:00 CEST	Brandão (yellow card) 53', (goal) 60', 69'	Report	Jacobsen 23'; Pereira (yellow card) 82'	Stadium: Hjørring Stadion; Referee: Michael Tykgaard

== Squad statistics ==
=== Goalscorers ===
Includes all competitive matches. The list is sorted by shirt number when total goals are equal.

As of match played 20 May 2017

Rank	Pos.	No.	Player	Superliga	DBU Pokalen	Total
1	FW	9	Rasmus Jönsson	8	2	10
2	FW	7	Jóan Símun Edmundsson	9	0	9
3	FW	10	Rasmus Festersen	6	1	7
4	FW	23	Thomas Mikkelsen	2	1	3
4	FW	28	Anders K. Jacobsen	2	1	3
6	DF	3	Frederik Tingager	2	0	2
6	DF	5	Kenneth Emil Petersen	2	0	2
6	MF	14	Jens Jakob Thomasen	2	0	2
9	MF	11	Casper Nielsen	1	0	1
9	MF	18	Mathias Thrane	1	0	1
9	DF	19	Mikkel Desler	1	0	1
9	MF	21	Mathias Greve	1	0	1
TOTALS				37	5	42

=== Disciplinary record ===
As of match played 20 May 2017

No.	Pos.	Name	Superliga		DBU Pokalen		Total	
No.	Pos.	Name	Yellow card	Red card	Yellow card	Red card	Yellow card	Red card
–	MF	(Netherlands) Mohamed El Makrini	6	1	1	0	7	1
7	FW	(Faroe Islands) Jóan Símun Edmundsson	7	0	0	0	7	0
2	DF	(Denmark) Kenneth Emil Petersen	7	1 (1)	0	0	7	1 (1)
3	DF	(Denmark) Frederik Tingager	2	2	0	0	2	2
6	DF	(Denmark) Jeppe Tverskov	4	0	0	0	4	0
10	FW	(Denmark) Rasmus Festersen	4	0	0	0	4	0
15	MF	(Nigeria) Izunna Uzochukwu	4	0	0	0	4	0
20	MF	(Denmark) Jacob Barrett Laursen	3	0	0	0	3	0
24	DF	(Denmark) Oliver Lund	3	0	0	0	3	0
28	FW	(Denmark) Anders K. Jacobsen	3	0	0	0	3	0
5	DF	(Portugal) João Pereira	1	0	1	0	2	0
14	MF	(Denmark) Jens Jakob Thomasen	2	0	0	0	2	0
19	MF	(Denmark) Mikkel Desler	2	0	0	0	2	0
22	FW	(Ghana) Nana Welbeck	1	0	1	0	2	0
23	FW	(Denmark) Thomas Mikkelsen	2	0	0	0	2	0
4	DF	(Denmark) Ryan Johnson Laursen	1	0	0	0	1	0
13	GK	(Norway) Sten Grytebust	1	0	0	0	1	0
18	MF	(Denmark) Mathias Thrane	1	0	0	0	1	0
21	MF	(Denmark) Mathias Greve	1	0	0	0	1	0
26	FW	(Ivory Coast) Yao Dieudonne	1	0	0	0	1	0
Total			56	4 (1)	3	0	59	4 (1)
