= 2017–18 Odense Boldklub season =

Odense Boldklub
2017–18 season
- Chairman: Niels Thorborg
- Manager: Kent Nielsen
- Stadium: EWII Park
- Superliga: 10th
- Danish Cup: Fourth round
- Top goalscorer: League: Anders K. Jacobsen (15 goals); All: Anders K. Jacobsen (15 goals)
Home colours	Away colours

The 2017–18 Odense Boldklub season was the club's 129th season, and their 56th appearance in the Danish Superliga. As well as the Superliga, the side was also competing in the DBU Pokalen.

OB finished 10th overall in the Superliga. Due to another disappointing season, head coach Kent Nielsen got fired on May 21.

== First team ==
Last updated on 31 January 2018

Squad no.	Name	Nationality	Position	Date of birth (age)
Goalkeepers
1	Thomas Mikkelsen	(Denmark)	GK	27 August 1983 (aged 34)
13	Sten Grytebust (third captain)	(Norway)	GK	25 October 1989 (aged 28)
27	Oliver Christensen	(Denmark)	GK	22 March 1999 (aged 19)
Defenders
2	Kenneth Emil Petersen (captain)	(Denmark)	CB	15 January 1985 (aged 33)
4	Ryan Johnson Laursen	(Denmark)	RB	14 April 1992 (aged 26)
5	João Pereira	(Portugal)	LB	10 May 1990 (aged 28)
6	Jeppe Tverskov	(Denmark)	CB	12 March 1993 (aged 25)
17	Jacob Buus	(Denmark)	CB	7 March 1997 (aged 21)
20	Jacob Barrett Laursen	(Denmark)	LB	17 November 1994 (aged 23)
24	Marco Lund	(Denmark)	CB	30 June 1996 (aged 21)
Midfielders
8	André Rømer	(Denmark)	CDM	18 July 1993 (aged 24)
11	Casper Nielsen	(Denmark)	CM	29 April 1994 (aged 24)
14	Jens Jakob Thomasen	(Denmark)	CM	25 May 1996 (aged 22)
16	Julius Eskesen	(Denmark)	CM	16 March 1999 (aged 19)
18	Mathias Thrane	(Denmark)	LM	19 February 1995 (aged 23)
19	Mikkel Desler	(Denmark)	RM	19 February 1995 (aged 23)
21	Mathias Greve	(Denmark)	RM	11 February 1995 (aged 23)
22	Nana Welbeck	(Ghana)	CM	24 November 1994 (aged 23)
23	Troels Kløve	(Denmark)	RM	23 October 1990 (aged 27)
25	Mohammed Fellah	(Norway)	AM	24 May 1989 (aged 29)
Forwards
7	Jóan Símun Edmundsson	(Faroe Islands)	FW	26 July 1991 (aged 26)
9	Rasmus Jönsson	(Sweden)	FW	27 January 1990 (aged 28)
10	Rasmus Festersen (vice-captain)	(Denmark)	FW	26 August 1986 (aged 31)
25	Nicklas Helenius	(Denmark)	FW	8 May 1991 (aged 27)
28	Anders K. Jacobsen	(Denmark)	FW	27 October 1989 (aged 28)

== Transfers and loans ==
=== Transfers in ===
Entry date	Position	No.	Player	From club	Fee	Ref.
1 July 2017	MF	16	(Denmark) Julius Eskesen	Youth academy		
1 July 2017	GK	27	(Denmark) Oliver Christensen	Youth academy		
1 July 2017	FW	25	(Denmark) Nicklas Helenius	(Denmark) Aalborg	Free transfer	
1 July 2017	GK	1	(Denmark) Thomas Mikkelsen	(Denmark) Fredericia	Free transfer	
4 January 2018	MF	8	(Denmark) André Rømer	(Denmark) Midtjylland		
15 January 2018	DF	24	(Denmark) Marco Lund	(Denmark) Esbjerg		
24 January 2018	MF	23	(Denmark) Troels Kløve	(Denmark) SønderjyskE		
30 January 2018	MF	25	(Norway) Mohammed Fellah	(Denmark) Nordsjælland	Loan	
Total						

=== Transfers out ===
Departure date	Position	No.	Player	To club	Fee	Ref.
30 June 2017	GK	1	(Denmark) Michael Falkesgaard	(Denmark) Midtjylland	End of contract	
30 June 2017	DF	24	(Denmark) Oliver Lund	(Denmark) Lyngby	End of contract	
30 June 2017	FW	27	(Denmark) Thomas Mikkelsen	(Denmark) Ross County	End of contract	
28 August 2017	FW	26	(Ivory Coast) Yao Dieudonne	(Denmark) Vendsyssel	Loan	
31 December 2017	FW	29	(Denmark) Kristian Weber	(Denmark) Marienlyst	End of contract	
2 January 2018	MF	15	(Nigeria) Izunna Uzochukwu	(China) Meizhou Hakka	Free transfer	
3 January 2018	DF	3	(Denmark) Frederik Tingager	(Germany) Eintracht Braunschweig	2,300,000 DKK	
Total					2,300,000 DKK	

== Competitions ==
=== Superliga ===
==== League table ====
Pos	Team	Pld	W	D	L	GF	GA	GD	Pts	Qualification
7	Hobro	26	8	8	10	33	33	0	32	Qualification for the Relegation round
8	SønderjyskE	26	8	7	11	36	34	+2	31	Qualification for the Relegation round
9	Odense	26	8	7	11	32	31	+1	31	Qualification for the Relegation round
10	Aarhus	26	7	8	11	23	36	−13	29	Qualification for the Relegation round
11	Silkeborg	26	8	4	14	32	49	−17	28	Qualification for the Relegation round

Source: Danish Football Association (in Danish), Soccerway
Rules for classification: 1) Points; 2) Goal difference; 3) Goals scored; 4) Away goals scored; 5) Play-off (played on neutral ground if determining teams for different rounds); 6) Draw.

==== Results summary ====
Overall								Home						Away					
Pld	W	D	L	GF	GA	GD	Pts	W	D	L	GF	GA	GD	W	D	L	GF	GA	GD
26	8	7	11	32	31	+1	31	6	2	5	20	14	+6	2	5	6	12	17	−5

Last updated: 9 March 2018.

==== Results by round ====
Matchday	1	2	3	4	5	6	7	8	9	10	11	12	13	14	15	16	17	18	19	20	21	22	23	24	25	26
Ground	H	A	H	H	A	H	A	H	A	H	A	H	A	A	H	A	H	A	H	H	A	A	H	A	H	A
Result	L	W	W	D	D	L	D	D	L	W	D	W	D	W	L	D	W	L	L	W	L	L	W	L	L	L
Position	12	7	4	4	6	8	8	7	9	7	7	7	7	6	7	7	6	6	8	5	6	6	5	7	7	9

Updated to match(es) played on 18 March 2018. Source: ob.dk
A = Away; H = Home; W = Win; D = Draw; L = Loss

==== Matches ====
Win Draw Loss

17 July 2017 1	Odense	1–2	Nordsjælland	Odense
19:00 CEST	Jacobsen 55'	Report	Asante 22'; Bartolec 67'	Stadium: EWII Park; Attendance: 6,993; Referee: Jens Maae

24 July 2017 2	Helsingør	0–2	Odense	Helsingør
19:00 CEST	Johannsen (yellow card) 75'	Report	Desler (yellow card) 10'; Jacobsen 24'; Uzochukwu (yellow card) 31'	Stadium: Helsingør Stadion; Attendance: 3,984; Referee: Peter Munch Larsen

29 July 2017 3	Odense	1–0	Horsens	Odense
16:00 CEST	Petersen (yellow card) 10'; Uzochukwu (yellow card) 42' (yellow-red card) 80'; Thomasen 86'	Report	Thorsen (yellow card) 11'; Kortegaard (yellow card) 47'; Okosun (yellow card) 58' (yellow-red card) 62'; Sanneh (yellow card) 77'	Stadium: EWII Park; Attendance: 5,009; Referee: Sandi Putros

6 August 2017 4	Odense	0–0	Aalborg	Odense
16:00 CEST	Tingager (yellow card) 50'	Report	Lesniak (yellow card) 75'	Stadium: EWII Park; Attendance: 4,824; Referee: Peter Kjærsgaard-Andersen

13 August 2017 5	Aarhus	0–0	Odense	Aarhus
19:00 CEST	Ankersen (yellow card) 44'; Spelmann (yellow card) 52'; Jovanović (yellow card) 70'	Report	Jönsson (yellow card) 34'	Stadium: Ceres Park; Attendance: 6,519; Referee: Dennis Mogensen

20 August 2017 6	Odense	0–2	Midtjylland	Odense
12:00 CEST	Edmundsson (yellow card) 22'; Uzochukwu (yellow card) 31'; Petersen (yellow card) 65'	Report	Sparv (yellow card) 21'; Drachmann (yellow card) 29'; Hende (yellow card) 64'; Sørloth 78' 90+3'	Stadium: EWII Park; Attendance: 7,427; Referee: Jørgen Daugbjerg Burchardt

25 August 2017 7	SønderjyskE	2–2	Odense	Haderslev
18:00 CEST	Uhre (yellow card) 24'; Zinckernagel (yellow card) 30'; Jakobsen 79'; Poulsen (yellow card) 90+1'; Rømer 90+3'	Report	Festersen 41'; Pereira (yellow card) 52'; Thrane (yellow card) 55'; Jacobsen 59' (pen.)	Stadium: Sydbank Park; Attendance: 5,642; Referee: Sandi Putros

10 September 2017 8	Odense	1–1	Brøndby	Odense
18:00 CEST	Uzochukwu 7', (red card) 10'; Petersen (yellow card) 59'	Report	Kliment 57', (yellow card) 90+1'	Stadium: EWII Park; Attendance: 10,717; Referee: Jakob Kehlet

15 September 2017 9	Silkeborg	1–0	Odense	Silkeborg
18:00 CEST	Vatsadze 35'	Report	Eskesen (yellow card) 88'	Stadium: JYSK Park; Attendance: 3,442; Referee: Dennis Mogensen

24 September 2017 10	Odense	3–1	Randers	Odense
16:00 CEST	Barrett 43'; Helenius 55'; Laursen 66'	Report	Bager (yellow card) 32'; Đurđić (yellow card) 52', (goal) 90+2'	Stadium: EWII Park; Attendance: 5,032; Referee: Morten Krogh

30 September 2017 11	Hobro	1–1	Odense	Hobro
16:00 CEST	Kirkevold 19' (pen.)	Report	Laursen (yellow card) 19'; Petersen (yellow card) 56'; Barrett 58'	Stadium: DS Arena; Attendance: 2,090; Referee: Michael Johansen

15 October 2017 12	Odense	1–0	Copenhagen	Odense
18:00 CEST	Jacobsen 1'; Petersen (yellow card) 61'	Report		Stadium: EWII Park; Attendance: 9,231; Referee: Michael Tykgaard

22 October 2017 13	Lyngby	1–1	Odense	Lyngby
14:00 CEST	George 5', (yellow card) 66'; Christjansen (yellow card) 55'	Report	Jacobsen 52'	Stadium: Lyngby Stadion; Attendance: 2,316; Referee: Benjamin Willaume-Jantzen

29 October 2017 14	Aalborg	0–2	Odense	Aalborg
18:00 CEST		Report	Festersen (yellow card) 21', (goal) 65'; Edmundsson 45'	Stadium: Aalborg Portland Park; Attendance: 5,597; Referee: Sandi Putros

5 November 2017 15	Odense	0–3	SønderjyskE	Odense
14:00 CEST		Report	Jónsson 66'; Leuijckx 79'; Zimling 81'	Stadium: EWII Park; Attendance: 6,035; Referee: Michael Tykgaard

19 November 2017 16	Horsens	0–0	Odense	Horsens
14:00 CEST	Finnbogason (yellow card) 65'; Hansson (yellow card) 65'; Qvist (yellow card) 87'	Report	Laursen (yellow card) 19'; Uzochukwu (yellow card) 41'; Petersen (yellow card) 63'; Barrett (yellow card) 90'	Stadium: CASA Arena Horsens; Attendance: 2,452; Referee: Peter Munch Larsen

26 November 2017 17	Odense	3–0	Hobro	Odense
14:00 CEST	Edmundsson 16'; Jacobsen 45+1'; Festersen 72'	Report		Stadium: EWII Park; Attendance: 4,068; Referee: Mads-Kristoffer Kristoffersen

4 December 2017 18	Midtjylland	3–1	Odense	Herning
19:00 CEST	J. Poulsen 12'; Duelund 24'; Korcsmár (yellow card) 33'; Dal Hende 38'; Hansen (yellow card) 59'	Report	Helenius 56'; Edmundsson (yellow card) 72'	Stadium: MCH Arena; Attendance: 6,600; Referee: Michael Tykgaard

10 December 2017 19	Odense	1–2	Silkeborg	Odense
12:00 CEST	Uzochukwu (yellow card) 29'; Tingager (yellow card) 64'; Petersen 90+4'	Report	Nilsson 55', 90+1'; Moro (yellow card) 70'	Stadium: EWII Park; Attendance: 3,856; Referee: Jens Maae

11 February 2018 20	Odense	6–1	Helsingør	Odense
14:00 CEST	Festersen 4'; Jacobsen 31', 40', 80'; Tverskov 53'; Greve (yellow card) 58'; Barrett (yellow card) 62'; Nielsen (yellow card) 77'; Helenius 85' (pen.)	Report	Mortensen 90+1'	Stadium: EWII Park; Attendance: 2,611; Referee: Sandi Putros

16 February 2018 21	Nordsjælland	2–1	Odense	Farum
19:00 CEST	Jensen 7', (yellow card) 84'; Rygaard 25'; Nelsson (yellow card) 58'	Report	Festersen 59'; Petersen (yellow card) 73'	Stadium: Right to Dream Park; Attendance: 1,930; Referee: Mads-Kristoffer Kristoffersen

25 February 2018 22	Copenhagen	1–0	Odense	Copenhagen
18:00 CEST	Skov (yellow card) 26', (goal) 61'; Boilesen (yellow card) 72'; Santander 86'	Report		Stadium: Telia Parken; Attendance: 9,903; Referee: Jakob Kehlet

28 February 2018 23	Odense	3–1	Lyngby	Odense
18:00 CEST	Kløve 23'; Jacobsen 33'; Pereira (yellow card) 45'; Marcussen 88' (o.g.)	Report	Shala (yellow card) 27'; Sørensen 45'; Ørnskov (yellow card) 47'; Christjansen (yellow card) 64'	Stadium: EWII Park; Attendance: 1,673; Referee: Mads-Kristoffer Kristoffersen

4 March 2018 24	Brøndby	2–1	Odense	Copenhagen
18:00 CEST	Mukhtar 40'; Pukki 77'	Report	Rømer (yellow card) 57'; Nielsen (yellow card) 73'; Greve 86'	Stadium: Brøndby Stadium; Attendance: 10,030; Referee: Jens Maae

9 March 2018 25	Odense	0–1	Aarhus	Odense
19:00 CEST	Festersen (yellow card) 34'; Lund (yellow card) 64'	Report	Stage 13'; Pušić (yellow card) 36'; Nielsen (yellow card) 42'; Junker (yellow card) 90'	Stadium: EWII Park; Attendance: 3,682; Referee: Peter Munch Larsen

18 March 2018 26	Randers	4–1	Odense	Randers
17:00 CEST	Conboy (yellow card) 21'; Bruhn (yellow card) 32'; Kauko (yellow card) 48'; Kadrii 59', 74', 90'; Lobzhanidze 90+4'	Report	Petersen (yellow card) 21'; Nielsen 38'; Rømer (yellow card) 21'; Jørgensen (yellow card) 76'; Edmundsson (yellow card) 85'	Stadium: BioNutria Park Randers; Attendance: 2,027; Referee: Jakob Kehlet

==== Relegation round ====
Pos	Team	Pld	W	D	L	GF	GA	GD	Pts	Qualification or relegation	ODE	SØN	RAN	LYN
1	Odense	32	11	9	12	43	37	+6	42	Qualification for the European play-off quarter-finals	—	2–1	3–0	3–0
2	SønderjyskE	32	11	8	13	42	40	+2	41	Qualification for the European play-off quarter-finals	2–0	—	1–0	1–0
3	Randers (O)	32	7	9	16	32	52	−20	30	Qualification for the relegation play-offs	1–1	3–0	—	2–0
4	Lyngby (R)	32	4	11	17	35	65	−30	23	Qualification for the relegation play-offs	2–2	1–1	1–3	—

Source: Soccerway
Rules for classification: 1) Points; 2) Goal difference; 3) Goals scored; 4) Away goals scored; 5) Play-off.
(O) Play-off winners; (R) Relegated

2 April 2018 27	Odense	2–1	SønderjyskE	Odense
14:00 CEST	Helenius 6'; Kløve 27'; Tverskov (yellow card) 54'	Report	Zimling 66' (pen.)	Stadium: EWII Park; Attendance: 2,933; Referee: Benjamin Willaume-Jantzen

7 April 2018 28	Lyngby	2–2	Odense	Lyngby
16:00 CEST	Kjær 15', 49', (yellow card) 85'; Tshiembe (yellow card) 71'; Simonsen (yellow card) 75'	Report	Jacobsen 48'; Greve 60'	Stadium: Lyngby Stadion; Attendance: 1,783; Referee: Morten Krogh

15 April 2018 29	Odense	3–0	Randers	Odense
12:00 CEST	Helenius 43' (pen.); Nielsen (yellow card) 45'; Jacobsen 47'; Greve 48'; Desler (yellow card) 65'	Report	Poulsen (yellow card) 18'; Conboy (yellow card) 43'	Stadium: EWII Park; Attendance: 2,748; Referee: Peter Munch Larsen

18 April 2018 30	Randers	1–1	Odense	Randers
18:00 CEST	Boman 62'	Report	Helenius 64'; Lund (yellow card) 67'; Desler (yellow card) 74'	Stadium: BioNutria Park Randers; Attendance: 2,257; Referee: Jens Maae

22 April 2018 31	Odense	3–0	Lyngby	Odense
14:00 CEST	Lund 7', (yellow card) 51'; Helenius 35'; Jacobsen 49'; Nielsen (yellow card) 78'	Report	Sørensen (yellow card) 48'; Fosgaard (yellow card) 66'	Stadium: EWII Park; Attendance: 3,753; Referee: Mads-Kristoffer Kristoffersen

29 April 2018 32	SønderjyskE	2–0	Odense	Haderslev
14:00 CEST	Kroon 58' (pen.); Simonsen (yellow card) 63'; Hvilsom 73'	Report	Petersen (yellow card) 57'	Stadium: Sydbank Park; Attendance: 4,242; Referee: Michael Johansen

=== European play-offs ===
==== Quarter-finals ====
6 May 2018 First leg	Aarhus	3–2	Odense	Aarhus
12:00 CEST	Sana 21'; Junker 53'; Pušić 57'; Pedersen (yellow card) 61'; Mikanović (yellow card) 86'	Report	Kløve 2', 42', (yellow card) 24'	Stadium: Ceres Park; Attendance: 9,770; Referee: Mads-Kristoffer Kristoffersen

13 May 2018 Second leg	Odense	2–3	Aarhus	Odense
18:00 CEST	Helenius 57' (pen.), (yellow card) 90+1'; Jacobsen 89'	Report	Bundu (yellow card) 5'; Stage 7'; Ankersen (yellow card) 51', (goal) 90+7'; Jacobsen 53', (yellow card) 75'; Sverrisson (yellow card) 80'	Stadium: EWII Park; Attendance: 8,107; Referee: Jørgen Daugbjerg Burchardt

Odense lost 4–6 on aggregate

=== DBU Pokalen ===
Win Draw Loss

29 August 2017 Second round	Dalum	0–1	Odense	Odense
17:30 CEST	Corfitzen 56'; Andersen 68'; Jensen (red card) 90+1'	Report	Eskesen 89'	Stadium: Dalum Stadion; Referee: Sandi Putros

21 September 2017 Third round	Fremad Amager	2–3	Odense	Copenhagen
18:15 CEST	Nordstrand 45'; Kaagh 85'	Report	Helenius 9'; Greve 59'; Thomasen 86'	Stadium: Sundby Idrætspark; Referee: Mads-Kristoffer Kristoffersen

25 October 2017 Fourth round	Odense	0–3	Midtjylland	Odense
18:00 CEST		Report	Duelund 35'; Sørloth 54'; Kraev 87'	Stadium: EWII Park; Attendance: 2,853; Referee: Mads-Kristoffer Kristoffersen

== Squad statistics ==
=== Goalscorers ===
Includes all competitive matches. The list is sorted by shirt number when total goals are equal.

As of match played 13 May 2018

Rank	Pos.	No.	Player	Superliga	DBU Pokalen	Total
1	FW	28	Anders K. Jacobsen	15	0	15
2	FW	25	Nicklas Helenius	8	1	9
3	FW	10	Rasmus Festersen	5	0	5
4	MF	21	Mathias Greve	3	1	4
4	MF	23	Troels Kløve	4	0	4
6	FW	7	Jóan Símun Edmundsson	2	0	2
6	MF	14	Jens Jakob Thomasen	1	1	2
6	DF	20	Jacob Barrett Laursen	2	0	2
9	DF	2	Kenneth Emil Petersen	1	0	1
9	DF	4	Ryan Johnson Laursen	1	0	1
9	DF	6	Jeppe Tverskov	1	0	1
9	MF	11	Casper Nielsen	1	0	1
9	MF	15	Izunna Uzochukwu	1	0	1
9	MF	16	Julius Eskesen	0	1	1
9	MF	24	Marco Lund	1	0	1
Own goals				1	0	1
TOTALS				47	4	51

=== Disciplinary record ===
As of match played 13 May 2018

No.	Pos.	Name	Superliga		DBU Pokalen		Total	
No.	Pos.	Name	Booked	Sent off (straight red)	Booked	Sent off (straight red)	Booked	Sent off (straight red)
—	MF	(Nigeria) Izunna Uzochukwu	7	2	0	0	7	2
2	DF	(Denmark) Kenneth Emil Petersen	10	0	0	0	10	0
11	MF	(Denmark) Casper Nielsen	4	0	0	0	4	0
7	FW	(Faroe Islands) Jóan Símun Edmundsson	3	0	0	0	3	0
19	DF	(Denmark) Mikkel Desler	3	0	0	0	3	0
24	DF	(Denmark) Marco Lund	3	0	0	0	3	0
—	DF	(Denmark) Frederik Tingager	3	0	0	0	3	0
4	DF	(Denmark) Ryan Johnson Laursen	2	0	0	0	2	0
5	DF	(Portugal) João Pereira	2	0	0	0	2	0
8	MF	(Denmark) André Rømer	2	0	0	0	2	0
10	FW	(Denmark) Rasmus Festersen	2	0	0	0	2	0
20	DF	(Denmark) Jacob Barrett Laursen	2	0	0	0	2	0
6	DF	(Denmark) Jeppe Tverskov	1	0	0	0	1	0
9	FW	(Sweden) Rasmus Jönsson	1	0	0	0	1	0
15	FW	(Denmark) Nicklas Helenius	1	0	0	0	1	0
16	MF	(Denmark) Julius Eskesen	0	0	1	0	1	0
18	MF	(Denmark) Mathias Thrane	1	0	0	0	1	0
21	MF	(Denmark) Mathias Greve	1	0	0	0	1	0
23	MF	(Denmark) Troels Kløve	1	0	0	0	1	0
29	FW	(Denmark) Mathias Jørgensen	1	0	0	0	1	0
Total			45	2	1	0	46	2
