= List of Danish football transfers summer 2016 =

This is a list of Danish football transfers for summer 2016, only the Danish Superliga is included

== Danish Superliga ==
=== AaB ===
In: Note: Flags indicate national team as defined under FIFA eligibility rules; some limited exceptions apply. Players may hold more than one non-FIFA nationality.

No.	Pos.	Nation	Player
5	DF	SWE	Markus Holgersson (from (Cyprus) Anorthosis Famagusta)
11	FW	DEN	Nicklas Helenius (loan return from (Germany) SC Paderborn 07)
14	MF	DEN	Casper Sloth (from (England) Leeds United)
20	MF	AUT	Marco Meilinger (from Austria Wien)

Out: Note: Flags indicate national team as defined under FIFA eligibility rules; some limited exceptions apply. Players may hold more than one non-FIFA nationality.

No.	Pos.	Nation	Player
9	MF	DEN	Thomas Augustinussen (retired)
10	FW	SWE	Rasmus Jönsson (released)
16	MF	DEN	Mathias Thrane (released)
23	MF	DEN	Nicolaj Thomsen (to (France) Nantes)
30	MF	DEN	Andreas Bruhn (released)

=== AGF ===
In: Note: Flags indicate national team as defined under FIFA eligibility rules; some limited exceptions apply. Players may hold more than one non-FIFA nationality.

No.	Pos.	Nation	Player
6	MF	ISL	Björn Daníel Sverrisson (from (Norway) Viking)
9	MF	DEN	Kasper Junker (from (Denmark) Randers)
15	DF	USA	A.J. Soares (from (Norway) Viking)
16	MF	AUS	Chris Ikonomidis (on loan from (Italy) Lazio)
26	GK	SRB	Aleksandar S. Jovanović (from (Serbia) Radnički Niš)

Out: Note: Flags indicate national team as defined under FIFA eligibility rules; some limited exceptions apply. Players may hold more than one non-FIFA nationality.

No.	Pos.	Nation	Player
8	MF	SRB	Aleksandar Čavrić (loan return to (Belgium) Genk)
10	MF	DEN	Kim Aabech (released)
15	FW	DEN	Emil Nielsen (loan return to (Norway) Rosenborg)
23	GK	DEN	Lukas Fernandes (to (Denmark) SønderjyskE)
24	MF	DEN	Malthe Dahl Overgaard (released)
25	DF	ESP	Piscu (released)
—	DF	DEN	Daniel Christensen (to (Belgium) Westerlo)

=== AC Horsens ===
In: Note: Flags indicate national team as defined under FIFA eligibility rules; some limited exceptions apply. Players may hold more than one non-FIFA nationality.

No.	Pos.	Nation	Player
—	MF	DEN	Kim Aabech (free agent)

Out: Note: Flags indicate national team as defined under FIFA eligibility rules; some limited exceptions apply. Players may hold more than one non-FIFA nationality.

No.	Pos.	Nation	Player

=== Brøndby IF ===
In: Note: Flags indicate national team as defined under FIFA eligibility rules; some limited exceptions apply. Players may hold more than one non-FIFA nationality.

No.	Pos.	Nation	Player
4	DF	GER	Benedikt Röcker (from (Germany) Greuther Fürth)
10	MF	GER	Hany Mukhtar (on loan from (Portugal) Benfica)
15	FW	CRC	Marco Ureña (from (Denmark) Midtjylland)
29	MF	CZE	Jan Kliment (on loan from (Germany) VfB Stuttgart)

Out: Note: Flags indicate national team as defined under FIFA eligibility rules; some limited exceptions apply. Players may hold more than one non-FIFA nationality.

No.	Pos.	Nation	Player
6	DF	DEN	Martin Ørnskov (released)
10	FW	SWE	Magnus Eriksson (to (Sweden) Djurgården)
11	MF	DEN	Jonas Borring (to (Denmark) Midtjylland)
11	FW	SWE	Johan Elmander (released)
15	FW	DEN	David Boysen (to (Netherlands) Roda JC)
17	MF	DEN	Riza Durmisi (released)
22	DF	DEN	Daniel Agger (retired)
28	DF	DEN	Malthe Johansen (released)
30	GK	DEN	Andreas Hansen (released)

=== Esbjerg fB ===
In: Note: Flags indicate national team as defined under FIFA eligibility rules; some limited exceptions apply. Players may hold more than one non-FIFA nationality.

No.	Pos.	Nation	Player
9	FW	DEN	Mads Dittmer Hvilsom (on loan from (Germany) Eintracht Braunschweig)
10	MF	AUS	Awer Mabil (on loan from (Denmark) Midtjylland)
22	FW	AUS	Brent McGrath (from (Denmark) Fredericia)

Out: Note: Flags indicate national team as defined under FIFA eligibility rules; some limited exceptions apply. Players may hold more than one non-FIFA nationality.

No.	Pos.	Nation	Player
9	FW	NED	Mick van Buren (released)
10	MF	DEN	Emil Lyng (released)
11	FW	DEN	Lasse Rise (released)
12	FW	DEN	Søren Andreasen (released)
19	FW	DEN	Ronnie Schwartz (loan return to (France) Guingamp)
21	DF	PHI	Jerry Lucena (retired)
22	MF	NOR	Mohammed Fellah (released)
31	MF	DEN	Jesper Rasmussen (released, previously on loan at (Denmark) Vejle)
—	MF	NOR	Magnus Lekven (to (Norway) Vålerenga)

=== FC Copenhagen ===
In: Note: Flags indicate national team as defined under FIFA eligibility rules; some limited exceptions apply. Players may hold more than one non-FIFA nationality.

No.	Pos.	Nation	Player
16	MF	SVK	Ján Greguš (from (Czech Republic) Jablonec)
20	DF	DEN	Nicolai Boilesen (from (Netherlands) Ajax)
22	DF	DEN	Peter Ankersen (from (Austria) Red Bull Salzburg, previously on loan)
23	FW	SRB	Andrija Pavlović (from (Serbia) Čukarički)
31	GK	SWE	Robin Olsen (from (Greece) PAOK, previously on loan)

Out: Note: Flags indicate national team as defined under FIFA eligibility rules; some limited exceptions apply. Players may hold more than one non-FIFA nationality.

No.	Pos.	Nation	Player
10	FW	DEN	Nicolai Jørgensen (to (Netherlands) Feyenoord)
20	DF	DEN	Christoffer Remmer (to (Norway) Molde)
28	GK	BEL	Thomas Kaminski (loan return to (Belgium) Anderlecht)
—	FW	BEL	Steve De Ridder (released)

=== FC Midtjylland ===
In: Note: Flags indicate national team as defined under FIFA eligibility rules; some limited exceptions apply. Players may hold more than one non-FIFA nationality.

No.	Pos.	Nation	Player
6	DF	FIN	Markus Halsti (free agent)
8	MF	NED	Rafael van der Vaart (from (Spain) Real Betis)
11	MF	DEN	Jonas Borring (from (Denmark) Brøndby)
88	MF	NOR	Gustav Wikheim (on loan from (Belgium) Gent)

Out: Note: Flags indicate national team as defined under FIFA eligibility rules; some limited exceptions apply. Players may hold more than one non-FIFA nationality.

No.	Pos.	Nation	Player
11	FW	CRC	Marco Ureña (to (Denmark) Brøndby)
15	DF	ISL	Böðvar Böðvarsson (loan return to (Iceland) FH)
20	DF	FIN	Daniel O'Shaughnessy (loan return to (England) Brentford)
27	MF	DEN	Pione Sisto (to (Spain) Celta de Vigo)
45	MF	AUS	Awer Mabil (on loan to (Denmark) Esbjerg)
77	MF	AUT	Daniel Royer (to (United States) New York Red Bulls)

=== FC Nordsjælland ===
In: Note: Flags indicate national team as defined under FIFA eligibility rules; some limited exceptions apply. Players may hold more than one non-FIFA nationality.

No.	Pos.	Nation	Player
11	MF	NOR	Mohammed Fellah (free agent)
12	MF	GHA	Ernest Asante (from (Norway) Stabæk)
14	MF	NOR	Mathias Rasmussen (from (Norway) Start)
21	GK	NED	Indy Groothuizen (on loan from (Netherlands) Ajax)

Out: Note: Flags indicate national team as defined under FIFA eligibility rules; some limited exceptions apply. Players may hold more than one non-FIFA nationality.

No.	Pos.	Nation	Player
10	MF	DEN	Martin Vingaard (released)
29	MF	TUR	Emre Mor (to (Germany) Borussia Dortmund)

=== Lyngby BK ===
In: Note: Flags indicate national team as defined under FIFA eligibility rules; some limited exceptions apply. Players may hold more than one non-FIFA nationality.

No.	Pos.	Nation	Player
—	GK	DEN	Jesper Hansen (from (France) Bastia)
—	MF	NOR	Kristoffer Larsen (from (Norway) Brann)
—	MF	DEN	Martin Ørnskov (free agent)
—	MF	DEN	Emil Larsen (from (United States) Columbus Crew)

Out: Note: Flags indicate national team as defined under FIFA eligibility rules; some limited exceptions apply. Players may hold more than one non-FIFA nationality.

No.	Pos.	Nation	Player
1	GK	SWE	Viktor Noring (released)
8	FW	NGA	Oke Akpoveta (released, previously on loan at (Denmark) Frej)
19	MF	DEN	Dennis Sørensen (retired)

=== OB ===
In: Note: Flags indicate national team as defined under FIFA eligibility rules; some limited exceptions apply. Players may hold more than one non-FIFA nationality.

No.	Pos.	Nation	Player
9	FW	SWE	Rasmus Jönsson (free agent)
18	MF	DEN	Mathias Thrane (free agent)

Out: Note: Flags indicate national team as defined under FIFA eligibility rules; some limited exceptions apply. Players may hold more than one non-FIFA nationality.

No.	Pos.	Nation	Player
1	GK	DEN	Michael Tørnes (released)
5	DF	DEN	Lasse Nielsen (released)
6	DF	GUI	Mohammed Diarra (released)
18	MF	DEN	Azer Bušuladžić (released)
22	DF	ISL	Ari Skúlason (to (Belgium) Lokeren)
25	GK	UKR	Maksym Koval (loan return to (Ukraine) Dynamo Kyiv)
29	MF	DEN	Anders Thomsen (released)
30	DF	DEN	Magnus Pedersen (released)

=== Randers FC ===
In: Note: Flags indicate national team as defined under FIFA eligibility rules; some limited exceptions apply. Players may hold more than one non-FIFA nationality.

No.	Pos.	Nation	Player
—	GK	DEN	Frederik Due (from (Denmark) Køge)
—	DF	DEN	Kasper Enghardt (from (Denmark) Helsingør)
—	FW	SWE	Marko Mitrović (from (Netherlands) Eindhoven)

Out: Note: Flags indicate national team as defined under FIFA eligibility rules; some limited exceptions apply. Players may hold more than one non-FIFA nationality.

No.	Pos.	Nation	Player
3	MF	DEN	Christian Keller (released)
14	MF	DEN	Kasper Junker (to (Denmark) AGF)
22	GK	AUS	Jack Duncan (released)
—	FW	NIG	Moussa Maâzou (to (France) Ajaccio)

=== Silkeborg IF ===
In: Note: Flags indicate national team as defined under FIFA eligibility rules; some limited exceptions apply. Players may hold more than one non-FIFA nationality.

No.	Pos.	Nation	Player
—	DF	DEN	Niels Bisp Rasmussen (from (Denmark) Vejle)

Out: Note: Flags indicate national team as defined under FIFA eligibility rules; some limited exceptions apply. Players may hold more than one non-FIFA nationality.

No.	Pos.	Nation	Player
3	MF	DEN	Christian Sørensen (released)
16	GK	DEN	Nicolai Flø (released)
25	DF	DEN	Nicolaj Ritter (released)

=== SønderjyskE ===
In: Note: Flags indicate national team as defined under FIFA eligibility rules; some limited exceptions apply. Players may hold more than one non-FIFA nationality.

No.	Pos.	Nation	Player
28	GK	DEN	Lukas Fernandes (from (Denmark) AGF)
31	MF	AUT	Matthias Maak (from (Austria) Grödig)

Out: Note: Flags indicate national team as defined under FIFA eligibility rules; some limited exceptions apply. Players may hold more than one non-FIFA nationality.

No.	Pos.	Nation	Player
20	DF	GHA	Francis Dickoh (released)
24	MF	DEN	Andreas Oggesen (to (Denmark) Fredericia)
—	DF	DEN	Søren Mussmann (to (Italy) Pro Vercelli)

=== Viborg FF ===
In: Note: Flags indicate national team as defined under FIFA eligibility rules; some limited exceptions apply. Players may hold more than one non-FIFA nationality.

No.	Pos.	Nation	Player

Out: Note: Flags indicate national team as defined under FIFA eligibility rules; some limited exceptions apply. Players may hold more than one non-FIFA nationality.

No.	Pos.	Nation	Player
4	DF	DEN	Jacob Egeris (released)
6	DF	DEN	Christopher Poulsen (released)
9	FW	CRO	Ante Rukavina (loan return to (Croatia) Dinamo Zagreb)
12	MF	DEN	Lukas Lerager (to (Belgium) Zulte Waregem)
19	MF	DEN	Jeff Mensah (released)
27	MF	DEN	Sebastian Andersen (released)
