= 2014–15 AaB Fodbold season =

AaB
2014–15 season
- Sports Director: Allan Gaarde
- Head Coach: Kent Nielsen
- Stadium: Nordjyske Arena
- Danish Superliga: 5th
- Danish Cup: Quarter-final
- UEFA Champions League: Play-off round
- UEFA Europa League: Round of 32
- Top goalscorer: League: Anders K. Jacobsen (10); All: Anders K. Jacobsen (13)
- Highest home attendance: 9,923 vs Hobro (17 October 2014, Danish Superliga)
- Lowest home attendance: 4,644 vs SønderjyskE (22 March 2015, Danish Superliga)
- Average home league attendance: 6,881
Home colours	Away colours

The 2014–15 AaB Fodbold season was AaB's 129th year in existence as a football club, 32nd consecutive season in the topflight of Danish football, and 25th consecutive season in the Danish Superliga. AaB contested in the 2015 Champions League, but was unsuccessful at defending its 2014 Superliga title by coming in 5th in 2015.

== Month by month review ==
Month	G	W	D	L	GF	GA	GD	GFA	GAA	Pts per G	Max Pts	Pts	Pts Diff	DSL Rnk
July	2	1	1	0	2	0	+2	1	0	2	6	4	2	2
August	0	0	0	0	0	0	0	0	0	0	0	0	0	0
September	0	0	0	0	0	0	0	0	0	0	0	0	0	0
October	0	0	0	0	0	0	0	0	0	0	0	0	0	0
November	0	0	0	0	0	0	0	0	0	0	0	0	0	0
December	0	0	0	0	0	0	0	0	0	0	0	0	0	0
February	0	0	0	0	0	0	0	0	0	0	0	0	0	0
March	0	0	0	0	0	0	0	0	0	0	0	0	0	0
April	0	0	0	0	0	0	0	0	0	0	0	0	0	0
May	0	0	0	0	0	0	0	0	0	0	0	0	0	0
Total	0	0	0	0	0	0	0	0	0	0	0	0	0	0

== Club ==
=== Coaching staff ===
Position	Staff
Head Coach	(Denmark) Kent Nielsen
Assistant coach	(Denmark) Allan Kuhn
Development Manager – AaB Fodbold	(Denmark) Poul Erik Andreasen
Goalkeeping coach	(Denmark) Poul Buus
Team Leader	(Denmark) Ernst Damborg
Doctor	(Denmark) Søren Kaalund
Physiotherapist	(Denmark) Morten Skjoldager
Physical trainer	(England) Ashley Tootle
Sports Psychology consultant	(Denmark) Martin Langagergaard
U/19 League coach	(Denmark) Jacob Friis
U/17 League coach	(Denmark) Lars Knudsen

Source: AaB Fodbold

=== Other information ===
Owner	(Denmark) AaB A/S
Chief Executive	(Denmark) Stephan Schors
Sports Director	(Denmark) Allan Gaarde
Sales Manager	(Denmark) Preben Hansen
Press and Communications	(Denmark) Brian Andersen
Conference Sales Manager	(Denmark) Birgitte Cassebaum Nielsen
Ground (capacity and dimensions)	Nordjyske Arena (13,800 / 105x70 metres)
Training ground	AaB Training Centre

Source: AaB Fodbold

== First team squad ==
As of 8 March 2015

Squad No.	Name	Nationality	Position(s)	Since	Date of birth (age)	Signed from	Games played	Goals scored
Goalkeepers
1	Nicolai Larsen	(Denmark)	GK	2010	9 March 1991 (age 35)	(Denmark) Lyngby Boldklub	140	0
22	Carsten Christensen	(Denmark)	GK	2011	28 August 1986 (age 39)	(Denmark) FC Fredericia	6	0
Defenders
3	Jakob Ahlmann	(Denmark)	LB / LWB	2009	18 January 1991 (age 35)	(Denmark) Midtjylland	87	3
5	Kenneth Emil Petersen	(Denmark)	CB	2009	15 January 1985 (age 41)	(Denmark) AC Horsens	162	11
6	Donny Gorter	(Netherlands)	LB	2014	15 June 1988 (age 38)	(Netherlands) AZ	18	0
20	Henrik Dalsgaard	(Denmark)	RB / RWB / RM / RW	2009	27 July 1989 (age 37)	(Denmark) Møldrup/Tostrup	164	10
26	Rasmus Thelander	(Denmark)	CB	2012	7 September 1991 (age 34)	(Denmark) AB	72	4
31	Jakob Blåbjerg	(Denmark)	CB / LB	2013	11 January 1995 (age 31)	(Denmark) AaB Academy	19	0
32	Kasper Pedersen	(Denmark)	CB / RB	2013	13 January 1993 (age 33)	(Denmark) AaB Academy	19	2
Midfielders
2	Patrick Kristensen	(Denmark)	LB / RB / CM / RM / RW	2006	28 April 1987 (age 39)	(Denmark) AaB Academy	243	10
7	Thomas Enevoldsen	(Denmark)	CM / AM / LM / LW	2014	27 July 1987 (age 39)	(Belgium) Mechelen	145	17
8	Rasmus Würtz (VC)	(Denmark)	CM / DM	2009	18 September 1983 (age 42)	(Denmark) Copenhagen	369	19
9	Thomas Augustinussen (C)	(Denmark)	CM / DM	2011	20 March 1981 (age 45)	(Austria) Red Bull Salzburg	402	45
14	Mathias Wichmann	(Denmark)	CM / AM / LM / RM	2009	6 August 1991 (age 35)	(Denmark) AaB Academy	128	5
15	Gilli Sørensen	(Faroe Islands)	LM / LW	2014	8 November 1992 (age 33)	(Faroe Islands) B36 Tórshavn	3	0
16	Mathias Thrane	(Denmark)	AM / RW	2014	12 May 1993 (age 33)	(Denmark) HIK	5	0
21	Kasper Risgård	(Denmark)	CM / DM	2013	4 January 1983 (age 43)	(Denmark) Silkeborg IF	217	28
23	Nicolaj Thomsen	(Denmark)	CM / AM / LM / LW	2011	8 May 1993 (age 33)	(Denmark) AaB Academy	97	8
25	Frederik Børsting	(Denmark)	CM / RM	2014	13 February 1995 (age 31)	(Denmark) AaB Academy	17	1
30	Andreas Bruhn	(Denmark)	CM / AM / LM / LW	2013	17 February 1994 (age 32)	(Denmark) AaB Academy	31	1
Forwards
10	Rasmus Jönsson	(Sweden)	CF / RW	2014	27 January 1990 (age 36)	(Germany) VfL Wolfsburg	24	6
11	Nicklas Helenius	(Denmark)	CF	2014	8 May 1991 (age 35)	(England) Aston Villa	136	46
18	Anders K. Jacobsen	(Denmark)	CF	2013	27 October 1989 (age 36)	(Denmark) FC Fredericia	63	14
19	Søren Frederiksen	(Denmark)	CF / LW	2013	8 July 1989 (age 37)	(Denmark) Copenhagen	52	7
28	Viktor Ahlmann	(Denmark)	AM / LM / RM / CF / LW / RW	2014	13 January 1995 (age 31)	(Denmark) AaB Academy	3	0
33	Lukas Spalvis	(Lithuania)	CF	2013	27 July 1994 (age 32)	(Denmark) AaB Academy	29	11

Source: AaB Fodbold website

== Transfers and loans ==
=== In ===
==== Summer ====
Squad #	Position	Player	Transferred from	Fee	Date	Source
16	AM	(Denmark) Mathias Thrane	(Denmark) HIK	Free transfer	14 July 2014	
10	ST	(Sweden) Rasmus Jönsson	(Germany) VfL Wolfsburg	Undisclosed	21 July 2014	

==== Winter ====
Squad #	Position	Player	Transferred from	Fee	Date	Source
14	AM	(Sweden) Andreas Blomqvist	(Sweden) Mjällby AIF	Undisclosed	22 January 2015	

=== Out ===
==== Summer ====
Squad #	Position	Player	Transferred To	Fee	Date	Source
10	ST	(Denmark) Jeppe Curth	(Denmark) Viborg	Free transfer	30 June 2014	
7	LM	(Denmark) Anders Due	(Denmark) Vestsjælland	Free transfer	30 June 2014	
29	ST	(Denmark) Rolf Toft	(Iceland) Stjarnan	Free transfer	15 July 2014	
17	RW	(Denmark) Kasper Kusk	(Netherlands) Twente	Undisclosed	15 July 2014	
27	CM	(Denmark) Christian Rye	(Denmark) Vendsyssel	Free transfer	24 July 2014	

==== Winter ====
Squad #	Position	Player	Transferred To	Fee	Date	Source
19	ST	(Denmark) Søren Frederiksen	(Iceland) KR	Free transfer	1 January 2015	
14	CM	(Denmark) Mathias Wichmann	(Denmark) Viborg	Free transfer	7 January 2015	

=== Loan in ===
Squad #	Position	Player	Loaned From	Start	End	Source
7	LW	(Denmark) Thomas Enevoldsen	(Belgium) Mechelen	16 June 2014	30 June 2015	
11	ST	(Denmark) Nicklas Helenius	(England) Aston Villa	9 July 2014	30 June 2015	
6	LB	(Netherlands) Donny Gorter	(Netherlands) AZ	18 August 2014	30 June 2015	

=== Loan out ===
Squad #	Position	Player	Loaned To	Start	End	Source

=== Overall transfer activity ===
==== Spending ====
Summer: £0

Winter: £0

Total: £0

==== Income ====
Summer: £0

Winter: £0

Total: £0

==== Expenditure ====
Summer: £0

Winter: £0

Total: £0

== Friendlies ==
=== Pre-season ===
1 July 2014 Friendly	AaB (Denmark)	2 – 2	(Norway) Strømsgodset	Aalborg, Denmark
16:00 CEST	Risgård 8'; Thrane 10'	Report	Kastrati 23', 35'	Stadium: Nordjyske Arena; Attendance: 4,500

7 July 2014 Friendly	Frederikshavn Xl (Denmark)	0 – 10	(Denmark) AaB	Frederikshavn, Denmark
20:00 CEST		Report	V. Ahlmann 14'; Nødgaard 17' (o.g.); Blåbjerg 32', 34'; Enevoldsen 33'; Wichmann 50'; Spalvis 74', 78'; Kusk 87'; Børsting 90'	Stadium: Frederikshavn Stadion; Attendance: 3,000

9 July 2014 Friendly	Standard Liège (Belgium)	0 – 0	(Denmark) AaB	Doorwerth, Netherlands
17:00 CEST		Report		Stadium: Hotel Golden Tulip Arnhem Training Ground

12 July 2014 Friendly	Ajax (Netherlands)	2 – 2	(Denmark) AaB	Rijnsburg, Netherlands
14:30 CEST	Schöne 38'; Petersen 74' (o.g.)	Report	Enevoldsen 22'; Helenius 84' (pen.)	Stadium: Sportpark Middelmors; Attendance: 3,000

=== Mid-season ===
23 January 2015 Friendly	AaB (Denmark)	3 – 3	(Denmark) AGF	Aalborg, Denmark
14:00 CET	Enevoldsen 3'; Helenius 14'; Jönsson 57'	Report	Aabech 17', 43', 52' (pen.)	Stadium: Provstejorden

25 January 2015 Friendly	Vendsyssel (Denmark)	0 – 0	(Denmark) AaB	Hjørring, Denmark
13:30 CET		Report		Stadium: Park Vendia

31 January 2015 Friendly	IK Start (Norway)	1 – 3	(Denmark) AaB	Kristiansand, Norway
19:00 CET	Castro 75'	Report	Risgård 29'; Thomsen 31', 36'	Stadium: Sørlandshallen

4 February 2015 Friendly	AaB (Denmark)	2 – 4	(Russia) CSKA Moscow	San Pedro del Pinatar, Spain
18:00 CET	Helenius 35', 76'	Report	Natcho 16' (pen.); Musa 19', 81'; Dzagoev 32'	Stadium: Pinatar Arena

7 February 2015 Friendly	AaB (Denmark)	1 – 2	(Ukraine) Shakhtar Donetsk	San Pedro del Pinatar, Spain
19:00 CET	Helenius 33'	Report	Taison 46'; Luiz Adriano 53'	Stadium: Pinatar Arena

13 February 2015 Friendly	AaB (Denmark)	0 – 0	(Norway) Odd	Aalborg, Denmark
14:30 CET		Report	Ruud (penalty missed) 36'	Stadium: Vejgård Gamle Stadion

== Competitions ==
=== Competition record ===
Competition	Record							
Competition	G	W	D	L	GF	GA	GD	Win %
Danish Superliga	33	13	9	11	39	31	+8	39.39
Danish Cup	3	2	0	1	7	6	+1	66.67
Champions League	4	1	1	2	3	6	−3	25.00
Europa League	8	3	0	5	6	16	−10	37.50
Total	48	19	10	19	55	59	−4	39.58

=== Danish Superliga ===
==== League table ====
Pos	Team	Pld	W	D	L	GF	GA	GD	Pts	Qualification or relegation
3	Brøndby	33	16	7	10	43	29	+14	55	Qualification for Europa League first qualifying round (Note: Copenhagen qualified for Europa League second qualifying round by winning the 2014–15 Danish Cup. Therefore the spots awarded to the runners-up and third-placed teams are passed down to the third-placed team and fourth-placed team respectively.)
4	Randers	33	14	10	9	39	28	+11	52	Qualification for Europa League first qualifying round
5	AaB	33	13	9	11	39	31	+8	48	
6	Nordsjælland	33	13	5	15	39	44	−5	44	
7	Hobro	33	11	10	12	40	47	−7	43	

Source: Danish Superliga
Rules for classification: 1) points; 2) goal difference; 3) number of goals scored

==== Results summary ====
Overall								Home						Away					
Pld	W	D	L	GF	GA	GD	Pts	W	D	L	GF	GA	GD	W	D	L	GF	GA	GD
33	13	9	11	39	31	+8	48	9	3	5	22	14	+8	4	6	6	17	17	0

Last updated: 7 June 2015.
Source: Competitive matches

==== Results by round ====
Round	1	2	3	4	5	6	7	8	9	10	11	12	13	14	15	16	17	18	19	20	21	22	23	24	25	26	27	28	29	30	31	32	33
Ground	A	H	A	H	H	A	H	A	H	A	H	A	H	H	A	H	A	H	A	H	A	H	A	H	A	A	H	A	H	A	H	A	H
Result	D	W	D	L	D	D	W	L	D	L	D	W	W	W	L	L	D	W	W	W	L	L	D	L	L	W	W	D	L	L	W	W	W
Position	5	2	5	5	7	7	5	6	6	7	8	7	6	4	5	6	6	5	4	4	4	6	6	7	7	7	5	5	5	6	5	5	5

Updated to match(es) played on 7 June 2015. Source: superstats.dk
A = Away; H = Home; W = Win; D = Draw; L = Loss

==== Matches ====
19 July 2014 1	SønderjyskE	0 – 0	AaB	Haderslev
17:00 CEST		Report		Stadium: Sydbank Park; Attendance: 3,228; Referee: Jakob Kehlet

26 July 2014 2	AaB	2 – 0	Midtjylland	Aalborg
17:00 CEST	Jacobsen 63'; Helenius 66' (pen.)	Report		Stadium: Nordjyske Arena; Attendance: 7,543; Referee: Jens Maae

2 August 2014 3	OB	1 – 1	AaB	Odense
17:00 CEST	Falk 33'	Report	Kristensen 66'	Stadium: TRE-FOR Park; Attendance: 5,840; Referee: Michael Tykgaard

9 August 2014 4	AaB	1 – 2	Nordsjælland	Aalborg
17:00 CEST	Helenius 17'	Report	John 57'; Lindberg 77'	Stadium: Nordjyske Arena; Attendance: 5,904; Referee: Dennis Mogensen

16 August 2014 5	AaB	1 – 1	Esbjerg	Aalborg
18:00 CEST	Petersen 3'	Report	Pušić 63'	Stadium: Nordjyske Arena; Attendance: 5,319; Referee: Michael Johansen

31 August 2014 6	Silkeborg	2 – 2	AaB	Silkeborg
13:00 CEST	Scheel 10', 45' (pen.)	Report	Jacobsen 8', 78'	Stadium: Mascot Park; Attendance: 3,067; Referee: Jakob Kehlet

13 September 2014 7	AaB	1 – 0	Copenhagen	Aalborg
20:35 CEST	Helenius 30' (pen.)	Report		Stadium: Nordjyske Arena; Attendance: 8,546; Referee: Mads-Kristoffer Kristoffersen

22 September 2014 8	Vestsjælland	1 – 0	AaB	Slagelse
19:00 CEST	Festersen 75'	Report		Stadium: Harboe Arena Slagelse; Attendance: 2,703; Referee: Peter Rasmussen

26 September 2014 9	AaB	0 – 0	Randers	Aalborg
18:30 CEST		Raport		Stadium: Nordjyske Arena; Attendance: 5,377; Referee: Peter Kjærsgaard-Andersen

5 October 2014 10	Brøndby	2 – 1	AaB	Brøndby
19:00 CEST	Pukki 44', 69'	Report	Frederiksen 73'	Stadium: Brøndby Stadion; Attendance: 15,412; Referee: Anders Poulsen

17 October 2014 11	AaB	1 – 1	Hobro	Aalborg
18:30 CEST	Bruhn 48'	Report	Antipas 15'	Stadium: Nordjyske Arena; Attendance: 9,923; Referee: Kenn Hansen

27 October 2014 12	Nordsjælland	0 – 1	AaB	Farum
19:00 CET		Report	Gregor 90+3' (o.g.)	Stadium: Farum Park; Attendance: 4,016; Referee: Jens Maae

3 November 2014 13	AaB	2 – 0	Silkeborg	Aalborg
19:00 CET	Jacobsen 38'; Dalsgaard 72'	Report		Stadium: Nordjyske Arena; Attendance: 6,240; Referee: Jørgen Daugbjerg Burchardt

9 November 2014 14	AaB	2 – 0	Vestsjælland	Aalborg
15:00 CET	Risgård 36'; Wichmann 60'	Report		Stadium: Nordjyske Arena; Attendance: 6,369; Referee: Michael Tykgaard

23 November 2014 15	Midtjylland	2 – 0	AaB	Herning
19:00 CET	Igboun 27'; Ureña 40'	Report		Stadium: MCH Arena; Attendance: 8,005; Referee: Lars Christoffersen

30 November 2014 16	AaB	0 – 1	Copenhagen	Aalborg
19:00 CET		Report	Cornelius 15'	Stadium: Nordjyske Arena; Attendance: 7,437; Referee: Jakob Kehlet

6 December 2014 17	OB	1 – 1	AaB	Odense
17:00 CET	Falk 75'	Report	Enevoldsen 66'	Stadium: TRE-FOR Park; Attendance: 5,025; Referee: Kenn Hansen

22 February 2015 18	AaB	1 – 0	Brøndby	Aalborg
19:00 CET	Jacobsen 90+3'	Report		Stadium: Nordjyske Arena; Attendance: 7,857; Referee: Jens Maae

2 March 2015 19	Esbjerg	1 – 3	AaB	Esbjerg
19:00 CET	Knudsen 44'	Report	Jacobsen 53'; Børsting 58'; Enevoldsen 81'	Stadium: Blue Water Arena; Attendance: 5,260; Referee: Benjamin Helm Svedborg

8 March 2015 20	AaB	2 – 1	Randers	Aalborg
19:00 CET	Petersen 13'; Enevoldsen 61'	Report	Ishak 15'	Stadium: Nordjyske Arena; Attendance: 5,670; Referee: Michael Tykgaard

16 March 2015 21	Hobro	1 – 0	AaB	Hobro
19:00 CET	Hvilsom 32'	Report		Stadium: DS Arena; Attendance: 6,596; Referee: Michael Johansen

22 March 2015 22	AaB	1 – 4	SønderjyskE	Aalborg
15:00 CET	Risgård 26'	Report	Pourié 49'; Songani 55'; Paulsen 78'; Absalonsen 80'	Stadium: Nordjyske Arena; Attendance: 4,644; Referee: Peter Rasmussen

6 April 2015 23	Randers	1 – 1	AaB	Randers
19:30 CEST	Lundberg 38'	Report	Risgård 61'	Stadium: AutoC Park Randers; Attendance: 5,083; Referee: Jakob Kehlet

12 April 2015 24	AaB	1 – 2	Midtjylland	Aalborg
17:00 CEST	Enevoldsen 27'	Report	Poulsen 38', 90+3'	Stadium: Nordjyske Arena; Attendance: 7,690; Referee: Lars Christoffersen

18 April 2015 25	Vestsjælland	2 – 1	AaB	Slagelse
15:00 CEST	Akharraz 47'; Kure 75'	Report	Helenius 18'	Stadium: Harboe Arena Slagelse; Attendance: 1,854; Referee: Peter Kjærsggard-Andersen

26 April 2015 26	SønderjyskE	0 – 3	AaB	Haderslev
14:00 CEST		Report	Jacobsen 63', 90+2'; Helenius 64'	Stadium: Sydbank Park; Attendance: 3,615; Referee: Kenn Hansen

1 May 2015 27	AaB	5 – 0	Hobro	Aalborg
18:30 CEST	Helenius 15', 21', 44' (pen.); Jacobsen 45+1'; Justesen 89' (o.g.)	Report		Stadium: Nordjyske Arena; Attendance: 9,401; Referee: Michael Tykgaard

10 May 2015 28	Brøndby	1 – 1	AaB	Brøndby
19:00 CEST	Larsson 45+2'	Report	Nørgaard 69' (o.g.)	Stadium: Brøndby Stadion; Attendance: 14,061; Referee: Kenn Hansen

15 May 2015 29	AaB	0 – 2	OB	Aalborg
18:30 CEST		Report	Skúlason 6' (pen.); Nielsen 35'	Stadium: Nordjyske Arena; Attendance: 7,506; Referee: Jakob Kehlet

20 May 2015 30	Copenhagen	1 – 0	AaB	Copenhagen
20:00 CEST	Gíslason 26'	Report		Stadium: Telia Parken; Attendance: 8,127; Referee: Jens Maae

26 May 2015 31	AaB	1 – 0	Esbjerg	Aalborg
19:00 CEST	Bruhn 90+3'	Report		Stadium: Nordjyske Arena; Attendance: 4,793; Referee: Anders Poulsen

31 May 2015 32	Silkeborg	1 – 2	AaB	Silkeborg
16:00 CEST	Agger 80'	Report	Jacobsen 2'; Jönsson 72'	Stadium: Mascot Park; Attendance: 2,103; Referee: Kenn Hansen

7 June 2015 33	AaB	1 – 0	Nordsjælland	Aalborg
16:00 CEST	Pedersen 71'	Report		Stadium: Nordjyske Arena; Attendance: 6,776; Referee: Lars Christoffersen

=== Danish Cup ===
30 October 2014 Third round	Vejle Boldklub	0 – 1 (a.e.t.)	AaB	Vejle
18:00 CET		Report	Augustinussen 100'	Stadium: Vejle Stadion; Attendance: 2,244; Referee: Dennis Mogensen

19 November 2014 Fourth round	Odder IGF	2 – 4	AaB	Aalborg^{1}
16:15 CET	Johansen 1'; Rocatis 21'	Report	Augustinussen 5'; Helenius 12'; Dalsgaard 53'; Jacobsen 74'	Stadium: Nordjyske Arena; Attendance: 4,117; Referee: Jens Maae

5 March 2015 Quarter-finals	Esbjerg	4 – 2	AaB	Esbjerg
20:35 CET	Lyng 51'; Mensah 68', 72'; Rise 88'	Report	Helenius 37'; Enevoldsen 41'	Stadium: Blue Water Arena; Attendance: 3,276; Referee: Jakob Kehlet

Notes

- Note 1: Due to inadequate lightning facilities at Odder IGF's home ground, Spektrum Park, the match was relocated to Nordjyske Arena, Aalborg.

=== UEFA Champions League ===
==== Qualifying phase and play-off round ====
===== Third qualifying round =====
30 July 2014 First leg	AaB (Denmark)	0 – 1	(Croatia) Dinamo Zagreb	Aalborg, Denmark
20:15 CEST		Report	Brozović 49'	Stadium: Nordjyske Arena; Attendance: 9,438; Referee: Danny Makkelie, Netherlands

6 August 2014 Second leg	Dinamo Zagreb (Croatia)	0 – 2 (1 – 2 agg.)	(Denmark) AaB	Zagreb, Croatia
20:45 CEST		Report	Jacobsen 36', 85'	Stadium: Stadion Maksimir; Attendance: 8,235; Referee: Yevhen Aranovskiy, Ukraine

===== Play-off round =====
20 August 2014 First leg	AaB (Denmark)	1 – 1	(Cyprus) APOEL	Aalborg, Denmark
20:45 CEST	Thomsen 16'	Report	Vinícius 54'	Stadium: Nordjyske Arena; Attendance: 9,663; Referee: Martin Atkinson, England

26 August 2014 Second leg	APOEL (Cyprus)	4 – 0 (5 – 1 agg.)	(Denmark) AaB	Nicosia, Cyprus
21:45 EEST	Vinícius 28'; De Vincenti 43'; Aloneftis 64'; Sheridan 75'	Report		Stadium: GSP Stadium; Attendance: 18,746; Referee: William Collum, Scotland

=== UEFA Europa League ===
==== Group stage ====
===== Table =====
Pos	Team	Pld	W	D	L	GF	GA	GD	Pts	Qualification	DYK	AAB	STE	RIO
1	(Ukraine) Dynamo Kyiv	6	5	0	1	12	4	+8	15	Advance to knockout phase	—	2–0	3–1	2–0
2	(Denmark) AaB	6	3	0	3	5	10	−5	9	Advance to knockout phase	3–0	—	1–0	1–0
3	(Romania) Steaua București	6	2	1	3	11	9	+2	7		0–2	6–0	—	2–1
4	(Portugal) Rio Ave	6	1	1	4	5	10	−5	4		0–3	2–0	2–2	—

Source: Soccerway
Rules for classification: Group stage tiebreakers

===== Matches =====
18 September 2014 1	Steaua București (Romania)	6 – 0	(Denmark) AaB	Bucharest, Romania
22:05 EEST	Sânmărtean 51'; Rusescu 59' (pen.), 73'; Keșerü 61', 65', 72'	Report		Stadium: Arena Națională; Attendance: 0 Referee: Vladislav Bezborodov, Russia

2 October 2014 2	AaB (Denmark)	1 – 0	(Portugal) Rio Ave	Aalborg, Denmark
19:00 CEST	Helenius 46'	Report		Stadium: Nordjyske Arena; Attendance: 4,741; Referee: Tony Chapron, France

23 October 2014 3	AaB (Denmark)	3 – 0	(Ukraine) Dynamo Kyiv	Aalborg, Denmark
19:00 CEST	Enevoldsen 11'; Thomsen 39', 90+1'	Report		Stadium: Nordjyske Arena; Attendance: 6,259; Referee: Stephan Studer, Switzerland

6 November 2014 4	Dynamo Kyiv (Ukraine)	2 – 0	(Denmark) AaB	Kyiv, Ukraine
22:05 EET	Vida 70'; Husyev 90+3'	Report		Stadium: NSC Olimpiyskiy; Attendance: 25,230; Referee: Aleksei Kulbakov, Belarus

27 November 2014 5	AaB (Denmark)	1 – 0	(Romania) Steaua București	Aalborg, Denmark
19:00 CET	Enevoldsen 72'	Report		Stadium: Nordjyske Arena; Attendance: 7,515; Referee: Felix Zwayer, Germany

11 December 2014 6	Rio Ave (Portugal)	2 – 0	(Denmark) AaB	Vila do Conde, Portugal
20:05 WET	Del Valle 59', 79'	Report		Stadium: Estádio do Rio Ave F.C. Attendance: 2,672; Referee: Sébastien Delferiere, Belgium

==== Knockout phase ====
===== Round of 32 =====
19 February 2015 First leg	AaB (Denmark)	1 – 3	(Belgium) Club Brugge	Aalborg, Denmark
19:00 CET	Helenius 71' (pen.)	Report	Oulare 25'; Refaelov 29'; Petersen 61' (o.g.)	Stadium: Nordjyske Arena; Attendance: 8,102; Referee: Tom Harald Hagen, Norway

26 February 2015 Second leg	Club Brugge (Belgium)	3 – 0 (6 – 1 agg.)	(Denmark) AaB	Bruges, Belgium
21:05 CET	Vásquez 11'; Oulare 64'; Bolingoli-Mbombo 74'	Report		Stadium: Jan Breydel Stadium; Attendance: 11,804; Referee: Anastasios Sidiropoulos, Greece

== Statistics ==
=== Appearances ===
As of 7 June 2015

This includes all competitive matches. The list is sorted by shirt number when total appearances were equal.

Rnk	Pos	No.	Player	Superliga	Cup	Champions League	Europa League	Total
1	FW	11	(Denmark) Nicklas Helenius	32	3	4	8	47
2	GK	1	(Denmark) Nicolai Larsen	32	3	4	7	46
3	FW	18	(Denmark) Anders K. Jacobsen	31	3	4	7	45
4	DF	5	(Denmark) Kenneth Emil Petersen	28	2	4	8	42
4	MF	7	(Denmark) Thomas Enevoldsen	29	2	3	8	42
4	MF	23	(Denmark) Nicolaj Thomsen	29	1	4	8	42
7	MF	21	(Denmark) Kasper Risgård	27	2	4	7	40
8	DF	20	(Denmark) Henrik Dalsgaard	26	3	2	8	39
9	MF	8	(Denmark) Rasmus Würtz	23	0	3	8	34
10	MF	9	(Denmark) Thomas Augustinussen	22	3	2	6	33
11	MF	30	(Denmark) Andreas Bruhn	21	3	1	7	32
12	DF	26	(Denmark) Rasmus Thelander	16	2	4	8	30
13	DF	2	(Denmark) Patrick Kristensen	21	1	4	2	28
14	DF	31	(Denmark) Jakob Blåbjerg	18	2	4	2	26
15	MF	25	(Denmark) Frederik Børsting	18	1	1	2	22
16	DF	32	(Denmark) Kasper Pedersen	18	2	0	0	20
17	DF	6	(Netherlands) Donny Gorter	9	2	1	6	18
17	MF	14	(Denmark) Mathias Wichmann	11	2	3	2	18
19	FW	10	(Sweden) Rasmus Jönsson	15	1	0	0	16
20	FW	19	(Denmark) Søren Frederiksen	6	2	0	4	12
21	FW	28	(Denmark) Viktor Ahlmann	7	1	1	1	10
22	FW	33	(Lithuania) Lukas Spalvis	6	0	2	0	8
23	MF	15	(Faroe Islands) Gilli Sørensen	9	0	0	0	9
24	MF	16	(Denmark) Mathias Thrane	3	0	1	1	5
25	GK	22	(Denmark) Carsten Christensen	1	0	0	2	3
26	DF	3	(Denmark) Jakob Ahlmann	2	0	0	0	2
26	MF	14	(Sweden) Andreas Blomqvist	1	1	0	0	2

=== Goalscorers ===
As of 7 June 2015

This includes all competitive matches. The list is sorted by shirt number when total goals were equal.

Rnk	Pos	No.	Player	Superliga	Cup	Champions League	Europa League	Total
1	FW	18	(Denmark) Anders K. Jacobsen	10	1	2	0	13
2	FW	11	(Denmark) Nicklas Helenius	8	2	0	2	12
3	MF	7	(Denmark) Thomas Enevoldsen	4	1	0	2	7
4	MF	21	(Denmark) Kasper Risgård	3	0	0	0	3
4	MF	23	(Denmark) Nicolaj Thomsen	0	0	1	2	3
6	DF	5	(Denmark) Kenneth Emil Petersen	2	0	0	0	2
6	MF	9	(Denmark) Thomas Augustinussen	0	2	0	0	2
6	DF	20	(Denmark) Henrik Dalsgaard	1	1	0	0	2
6	MF	30	(Denmark) Andreas Bruhn	2	0	0	0	2
10	DF	2	(Denmark) Patrick Kristensen	1	0	0	0	1
10	FW	10	(Sweden) Rasmus Jönsson	1	0	0	0	1
10	MF	14	(Denmark) Mathias Wichmann	1	0	0	0	1
10	FW	19	(Denmark) Søren Frederiksen	1	0	0	0	1
10	MF	25	(Denmark) Frederik Børsting	1	0	0	0	1
10	DF	32	(Denmark) Kasper Pedersen	1	0	0	0	1
—	Own Goals			3	0	0	0	3
TOTALS				39	7	3	6	55

=== Assists ===
As of 7 June 2015

This includes all competitive matches. The list is sorted by shirt number when total assists were equal.

Rnk	Pos	No.	Player	Superliga	Cup	Champions League	Europa League	Total
1	MF	23	(Denmark) Nicolaj Thomsen	6	0	0	0	6
2	FW	11	(Denmark) Nicklas Helenius	4	1	0	0	5
2	DF	20	(Denmark) Henrik Dalsgaard	4	1	0	0	5
4	FW	18	(Denmark) Anders K. Jacobsen	4	0	0	0	4
5	DF	6	(Netherlands) Donny Gorter	0	2	0	1	3
5	MF	7	(Denmark) Thomas Enevoldsen	2	0	1	0	3
7	DF	2	(Denmark) Patrick Kristensen	1	0	1	0	2
7	MF	21	(Denmark) Kasper Risgård	1	0	0	1	2
7	MF	30	(Denmark) Andreas Bruhn	1	0	0	1	2
10	DF	3	(Denmark) Jakob Ahlmann	1	0	0	0	1
10	MF	9	(Denmark) Thomas Augustinussen	1	0	0	0	1
10	FW	10	(Sweden) Rasmus Jönsson	1	0	0	0	1
10	MF	14	(Denmark) Mathias Wichmann	1	0	0	0	1
10	MF	15	(Faroe Islands) Gilli Sørensen	1	0	0	0	1
10	FW	19	(Denmark) Søren Frederiksen	0	0	0	1	1
10	MF	25	(Denmark) Frederik Børsting	1	0	0	0	1
10	DF	26	(Denmark) Rasmus Thelander	1	0	0	0	1
10	DF	31	(Denmark) Jakob Blåbjerg	0	0	1	0	1
10	DF	32	(Denmark) Kasper Pedersen	0	1	0	0	1
TOTALS				30	5	3	4	42

=== Clean sheets ===
As of 7 June 2015

This includes all competitive matches. The list is sorted by shirt number when total clean sheets were equal.

Rnk	Pos	No.	Player	Superliga	Cup	Champions League	Europa League	Total
1	GK	1	(Denmark) Nicolai Larsen	11	1	1	2	15
2	GK	22	(Denmark) Carsten Christensen	1	0	0	1	2
TOTALS				12	1	1	3	17

=== Disciplinary record ===
As of 7 June 2015

This includes all competitive matches. The list is sorted by shirt number when total cards were equal.

Rnk	Pos.	No.	Player	Superliga		Cup		Champions League		Europa League		Total	
Rnk	Pos.	No.	Player	Booked	Sent off (straight red)	Booked	Sent off (straight red)	Booked	Sent off (straight red)	Booked	Sent off (straight red)	Booked	Sent off (straight red)
1	MF	8	(Denmark) Rasmus Würtz	7	1	0	0	0	0	2	0	9	1
2	GK	1	(Denmark) Nicolai Larsen	2	0	0	0	0	0	0	1	2	1
3	DF	5	(Denmark) Kenneth Emil Petersen	8	0	0	0	1	0	1	0	10	0
4	MF	21	(Denmark) Kasper Risgård	7	0	0	0	0	0	2	0	9	0
5	MF	7	(Denmark) Thomas Enevoldsen	7	0	0	0	0	0	0	0	7	0
6	FW	18	(Denmark) Anders K. Jacobsen	3	0	0	0	1	0	2	0	6	0
6	DF	26	(Denmark) Rasmus Thelander	3	0	1	0	0	0	2	0	6	0
8	DF	20	(Denmark) Henrik Dalsgaard	3	0	0	0	0	0	2	0	5	0
9	DF	6	(Netherlands) Donny Gorter	3	0	0	0	0	0	1	0	4	0
9	MF	9	(Denmark) Thomas Augustinussen	3	0	0	0	0	0	1	0	4	0
9	FW	11	(Denmark) Nicklas Helenius	4	0	0	0	0	0	0	0	4	0
9	MF	30	(Denmark) Andreas Bruhn	2	0	2	0	0	0	0	0	4	0
13	MF	23	(Denmark) Nicolaj Thomsen	2	0	0	0	1	0	0	0	3	0
13	MF	25	(Denmark) Frederik Børsting	3	0	0	0	0	0	0	0	3	0
15	DF	2	(Denmark) Patrick Kristensen	2	0	0	0	0	0	0	0	2	0
16	DF	31	(Denmark) Jakob Blåbjerg	0	0	0	0	1	0	0	0	1	0
TOTALS				59	1	3	0	4	0	12	1	78	2

=== Summary ===
As of 7 June 2015

Games played	48 (33 Danish Superliga, 3 Danish Cup, 4 UEFA Champions League, 8 UEFA Europa League)
Games won	19 (13 Danish Superliga, 2 Danish Cup, 1 UEFA Champions League, 3 UEFA Europa League)
Games drawn	10 (9 Danish Superliga, 1 UEFA Champions League)
Games lost	19 (11 Danish Superliga, 1 Danish Cup, 2 UEFA Champions League, 5 UEFA Europa League)
Goals scored	55 (39 Danish Superliga, 7 Danish Cup, 3 UEFA Champions League, 6 UEFA Europa League)
Goals conceded	59 (31 Danish Superliga, 6 Danish Cup, 6 UEFA Champions League, 16 UEFA Europa League)
Goal difference	–4 (+8 Danish Superliga, +1 Danish Cup, –3 UEFA Champions League, –10 UEFA Europa League)
Clean sheets	17 (12 Danish Superliga, 1 Danish Cup, 1 UEFA Champions League, 3 UEFA Europa League)
Yellow cards	78 (59 Danish Superliga, 3 Danish Cup, 4 UEFA Champions League, 12 UEFA Europa League)
Red cards	2 (1 Danish Superliga, 1 UEFA Europa League)
Best result(s)	W 5 – 0 (H) v Hobro – Danish Superliga – 1 May 2015
Worst result(s)	L 0 – 6 (A) v Steaua București – UEFA Europa League – 18 September 2014
Most appearances	Nicklas Helenius (47 appearances)
Top scorer(s)	Anders K. Jacobsen (13 goals)
Top assister(s)	Nicolaj Thomsen (6 assists)
Worst discipline	Rasmus Würtz (9 (yellow card) , 1 (red card) )

== Awards ==
=== Individual ===
No.	Player	Award	Month	Source
1	(Denmark) Nicolai Larsen	Danish Football Keeper of the Year 2014	December 2014	
3	(Denmark) Jakob Ahlmann	AaB Goal of the Year 2014	January 2015	
–	(Denmark) Kent Nielsen	Danish Coach of the Year 2014	February 2015	

=== Team ===
Award	Month	Source
Celebration of the Year 2014	January 2015	
Northern Jutland Sportsname of the Year 2014	April 2015	
Danish Reserve League 2014–15	May 2015	
