= Nana Welbeck =

Ghanaian footballer

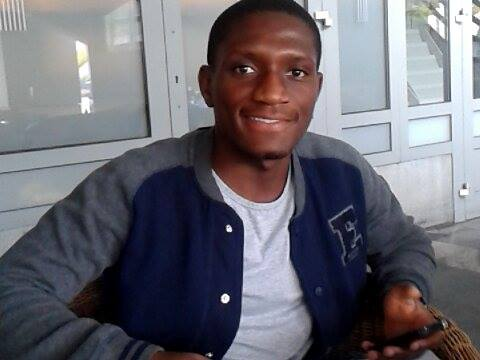

Personal information
- Full name: Nana Addo Welbeck-Maseko
- Date of birth: 25 November 1994 (age 31)
- Place of birth: Kumasi, Ghana
- Height: 1.79 m (5 ft 10 in)
- Position: Midfielder

Team information
- Current team: Imperia
- Number: 6

Youth career
- 2004–2009: Asante Kotoko
- 2009–2012: Brescia

Senior career*
Years	Team	Apps	(Gls)
2011–2014	Brescia	4	(0)
2014	Atalanta	0	(0)
2014–2015	→ Krka (loan)	27	(2)
2015–2016	Krka	34	(3)
2016–2018	OB	12	(0)
2018–2019	Mladost Doboj Kakanj	20	(1)
2019–2021	Catania	49	(2)
2021–2024	Catanzaro	38	(0)
2024	Catania	19	(0)
2024–2025	Lucchese	23	(0)
2025–2026	Livorno	8	(0)
2026–	Imperia	0	(0)
- * Club domestic league appearances and goals as of 26 April 2026

Nana Addo Welbeck-Maseko (born 24 November 1994) is a Ghanaian professional footballer who plays as a midfielder for Italian Serie D club Imperia.

== Career ==
=== Brescia ===
In December 2009, Welbeck signed a five-year deal with Serie B team Brescia.

Welbeck's professional debut came on 22 May 2011, in a 2–2 draw against Fiorentina, coming on for the final 30 minutes of the Serie A season.

During the 2011–12 Serie B season, Welbeck made two first-team appearances, including his first start against Crotone on the final matchday of the season. The majority of Welbeck's playing time came in the Campionato Nazionale Primavera Group B, scoring four goals in 24 games.

Welbeck again featured mainly in the Campionato Primavera Group B in the 2012–13 season, only playing the one first team game against Spezia Calcio and being an unused substitute eight times.

=== Atalanta and Krka ===
Welbeck signed with Atalanta on 25 August 2014. Five days later, he joined Slovenian PrvaLiga club Krka on a season-loan, which was made into a permanent deal the following summer. While at Krka, he played 61 league games and scored 5 league goals.

=== OB ===
Welbeck signed a two-year contract with Danish Superliga club Odense Boldklub on 3 August 2016. He left the club in 2018 after the expiry of his contract, making 15 total appearances through two seasons.

=== Mladost Doboj Kakanj ===
On 9 July 2018, Welbeck signed a two-year contract with Premier League of Bosnia and Herzegovina club FK Mladost Doboj Kakanj. He made his competitive debut for Mladost on 29 July 2018 in a 4–0 away loss to FK Sarajevo.

The first goal he scored for the club was on 24 November 2018, in a 3–0 away win against NK Čelik Zenica.

=== Catania ===
On 28 June 2019, Welbeck had to leave Mladost return to Ghana for private reasons. On 8 July 2019 he signed a two-year contract with Catania. He scored a beautiful goal during the first match of the season, between Avellino and Catania, which finished 6–3.

=== Catanzaro ===
On 7 July 2021 he signed a two-year contract for Catanzaro. He made his competitive debut for the club on 7 August, starting against Como in the Italian Cup as his team advanced after winning the penalty shootout.

=== Lucchese ===
On 31 July 2024, Welbeck signed a two-year contract with Lucchese.

== Career statistics ==
=== Club ===
As of match played 24 April 2022

Appearances and goals by club, season and competition
Club	Season	League			National Cup		Other		Total	
Club	Season	Division	Apps	Goals	Apps	Goals	Apps	Goals	Apps	Goals
Brescia	2010–11	Serie A	1	0	0	0	—		1	0
Brescia	2011–12	Serie B	2	0	0	0	—		2	0
Brescia	2012–13	Serie B	1	0	0	0	—		1	0
Brescia	Total		4	0	0	0	0	0	4	0
Krka (loan)	2014–15	Prva Liga	27	2	3	0	—		30	2
Krka	2015–16	Prva Liga	34	3	2	0	—		36	3
Krka	Total		61	5	5	0	0	0	66	5
OB	2016–17	Danish Superliga	9	0	2	0	3 (Note: Two appearances in Superligaen Relegation round, one appearance in Superligaen Playoffs)	0	14	0
OB	2017–18	Danish Superliga	3	0	1	0	—		4	0
OB	Total		12	0	3	0	3	0	18	0
Mladost Doboj Kakanj	2018–19	Premijer Liga	20	1	0	0	—		20	1
Catania	2019–20	Serie C	16	1	0	0	2 (Note: Appearance(s) in Promotion Playoffs)	0	18	1
Catania	2020–21	Serie C	33	1	1	0	1	0	35	1
Catania	Total		49	2	1	0	3	0	53	2
Catanzaro	2021–22	Serie C	28	0	1	0	—		29	0
Career total			178	8	10	0	6	0	190	8
