= Jesper Christjansen =

Danish footballer (born 1987)

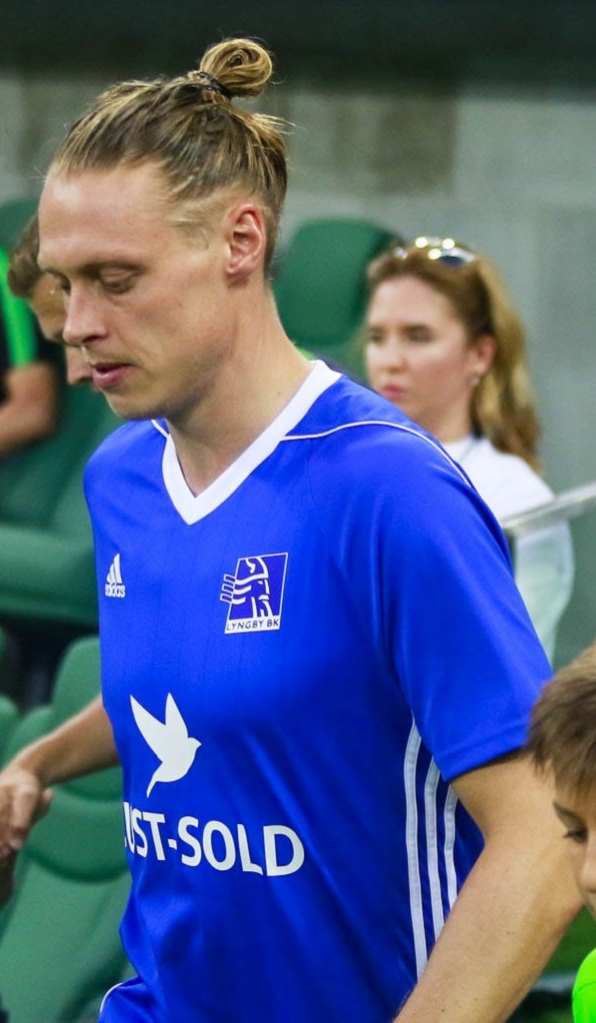
- Christjansen with Lyngby in 2017.

Personal information
- Full name: Jesper Christjansen
- Date of birth: 29 December 1987 (age 38)
- Place of birth: Skovlunde, Denmark
- Height: 1.82 m (6 ft 0 in)
- Position: Midfielder

Youth career
- Skovlunde IF
- Brøndby IF

Senior career*
Years	Team	Apps	(Gls)
2006–2009	Brøndby IF	0	(0)
2009	Lolland Falster Alliancen	12	(1)
2009–2010	BK Frem	28	(4)
2010–2011	Hvidovre IF	40	(4)
2011–2014	Brønshøj BK	62	(11)
2014–2020	Lyngby BK	150	(14)
2020	NSÍ Runavík	13	(4)
- * Club domestic league appearances and goals

Jesper Christjansen (Danish pronunciation: [ˈjespɐ kʰʁeˈstjænsn̩, - kʰʁæˈ-]; born 29 December 1987) is a Danish former professional footballer who played as a midfielder.

== Career ==
=== Early career ===
Christjansen first played for a local club, Skovlunde IF, and before joining the Brøndby IF youth academy. There, he went through the different age groups before reaching the U-21 team, where he was eventually made team captain. As one of the U-21 profiles, Christjansen trained with the first team on occasion and appeared on the first-team bench several times under coach Tom Køhlert in 2007.

On 24 January 2009, in search of more playing time, Christjansen signed with Lolland Falster Alliancen in the bottom of the Danish second tier. LFA finished 14th out of 16 that season, effectuating direct relegation to the Danish third tier.

On 30 July 2009, half a year after signing with LFA, Christjansen was signed by BK Frem who had stayed up in the second tier the season before. For Frem, he was a first-team regular during the 2009–10 season, and was named as one of the players on the shortlist for the Division Player of the Year award. Frem went bankrupt at the end of the season and were demoted to the Copenhagen Series, the Danish fifth division, effectively making Christjansen a free agent.

Following Frem's bankruptcy, Christjansen signed with Hvidovre IF, which allowed him to continue playing in the second tier on an amateur contract. On 22 December 2011, he signed a professional contract with Brønshøj BK from the Danish third tier, managed by Bo Henriksen. In Brønshøj, he grew out to become a first-team starter and vice-captain.

=== Lyngby ===
On 12 June 2014, after Christjansen's contract with Brønshøj had expired, he signed a two-year contract with Lyngby BK. On 19 January 2016, his contract was extended with Lyngby for another 1 1/2 years, and coach David Nielsen cited his hard-working attitude as the reason for his contract extension. A few months later, on 8 May, Christjansen and Lyngby secured promotion to the Danish Superliga by beating FC Helsingør 1–0. On 16 July 2016, Christjansen made his first appearance at the highest level, starting in the opening game of the season away at F.C. Copenhagen which Lyngby lost 3–0. The season became an overwhelming success for Christjansen and Lyngby, as the club reached Europa League play-offs after securing a third place in the Superliga. That season, he made 34 appearances and scored four goals.

Christjansen made his European debut on 29 June 2017, as Lyngby beat Welsh side Bangor City 1–0 to kick off their European campaign.

=== NSÍ Runavík ===
As Christjansen's contract with Lyngby expired following the 2019–20 season, he signed a six-month contract with NSÍ Runavík on 26 July 2020 keeping him a part of the club until the end of 2020 Faroe Islands Premier League. He scored his first goal for the club on 6 August in a 1–0 away win over ÍF Fuglafjørður.

Christjansen left Runavík in the beginning of January 2021 and later announced his retirement on 19 March 2021 at the age of 33.
