= Rasmus Marvits =

Danish footballer

Personal information
- Date of birth: 14 July 1978 (age 48)
- Place of birth: Hvidovre, Denmark
- Height: 1.86 m (6 ft 1 in)
- Position: Defender

Senior career*
Years	Team	Apps	(Gls)
1996–2001	Lyngby BK	75	(4)
2002–2004	FC Nordsjælland	72	(10)
2004–2005	Køge BK		
2005–2007	AC Horsens	49	(0)
2007–2010	Lyngby BK	19	(0)
2009	→ Brønshøj BK (leje)	12	(1)
- * Club domestic league appearances and goals

Rasmus Marvits (born 14 July 1978) is a Danish former professional footballer who played as a defender.
