= Lukas Fernandes (footballer) =

Danish footballer (born 1993)

Personal information
- Full name: Lukas Filip Nimb Fernandes
- Date of birth: 1 March 1993 (age 33)
- Place of birth: Copenhagen, Denmark
- Position: Goalkeeper

Team information
- Current team: Thisted FC (goalkeeper coach)

Youth career
- Lyngby

Senior career*
Years	Team	Apps	(Gls)
2011–2014	Lyngby	45	(0)
2014–2016	AGF	9	(0)
2016–2018	SønderjyskE	27	(0)

International career
2008–2009	Denmark U16	3	(0)
2009–2010	Denmark U17	7	(0)
2010–2011	Denmark U18	2	(0)
2011–2012	Denmark U19	3	(0)
2016	Denmark U21	1	(0)

Managerial career
- 2023–: Thisted FC (goalkeeper coach)
- * Club domestic league appearances and goals

Lukas Filip Nimb Fernandes (born 1 March 1993) is a Danish retired professional footballer who most recently played for SønderjyskE in 2018.

== Career ==
=== Coaching career ===
After leaving SønderjyskE in September 2018, 25-year old Fernandes retired from football. He only returned to football in January 2023, when he was hired as goalkeeping coach for Danish 2nd Division side Thisted FC.
