= Silkeborg Stadium =

Football stadium in Silkeborg, Denmark

Coordinates: 56.157884°N 9.553278°E

Mascot Park
- Interactive map of Mascot Park
- Former names: Silkeborg Stadion
- Location: Stadion Allé 14 8600 Silkeborg
- Capacity: 10,000
- Record attendance: 12,288 Silkeborg IF and Brøndby IF in 1995
- Field size: 105 x 68
- Surface: Grass

Construction
- Built: 1923
- Closed: 2017

Tenants
- Silkeborg IF

Silkeborg Stadium (Danish: Silkeborg Stadion), latterly known as Mascot Park for sponsorship reasons, was a Danish football stadium in the town of Silkeborg, located in the middle of Jutland. It was home to the Danish Superliga club Silkeborg IF until the opening of JYSK Park in 2017.

The track was founded in 1925, and in 1943 was also a stadium house built with primitive dressing rooms. By this time, Silkeborg Stadium was used for both football and athletics, with a running track around the pitch. The old stadium house, built in Swiss style with balconies, remained a part of the stadium although new and modern facilities were added. Players run on the trackfrom the doors of the stadium building. When Silkeborg IF achieved success in the 1990s, it was necessary to modernise the stadium and the stands latterly consisted primarily of covered seating. The away section did not have any seating whatsoever. In the year 2000 the running track around the field was removed, with athletics events relocated to Silkeborg Athletics Stadium. The stadium latterly held 10,000 spectators, with approximately 5,500 seats. The record attendance was set in 1995 when 12,288 people watched the match between Silkeborg IF and Brøndby IF. The pitch size was 105 x 68 meters and lighting was at 1,400 lux. In 2012, the stadium was renamed to Mascot Park until the end of 2013.

In 2017, Silkeborg IF moved to a new stadium, JYSK Park. Silkeborg Stadium was demolished in August 2017.
