= Kenneth Emil Petersen =

Danish footballer (born 1985)

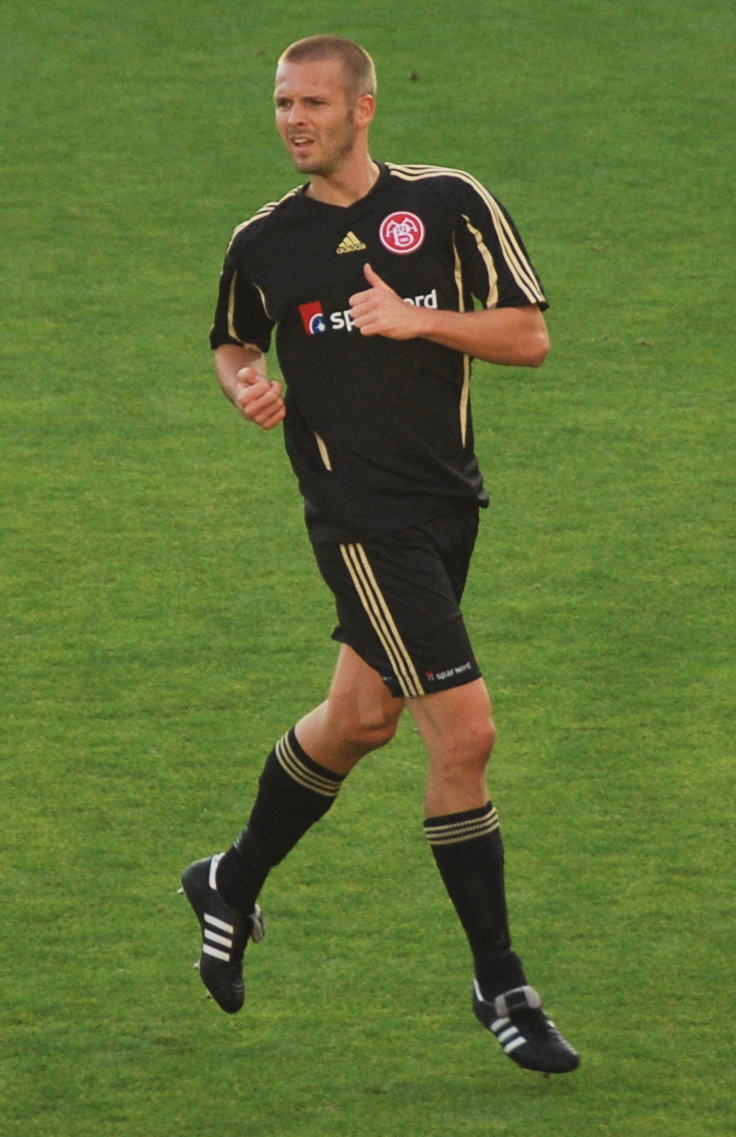

Personal information
- Full name: Kenneth Emil Petersen
- Date of birth: 15 January 1985 (age 41)
- Place of birth: Solrød, Denmark
- Height: 1.98 m (6 ft 6 in)
- Position: Centre back

Youth career
- Solrød FC
- 1998–2003: Herfølge Boldklub

Senior career*
Years	Team	Apps	(Gls)
2003–2006	Herfølge Boldklub	7	(0)
2005	→ Ølstykke (loan)	?	(?)
2006–2009	Horsens	62	(3)
2009–2016	AaB	165	(8)
2016–2018	OB	57	(3)

International career
2009	Denmark League XI	2	(0)
- * Club domestic league appearances and goals

Kenneth Emil Petersen (born 15 January 1985), also known as KEP, is a Danish football pundit and former player. He played as a centre back.

== Club career ==
=== Herfølge ===
Petersen started his career at Herfølge Boldklub. He made his professional debut for the club on 28 March 2004 in a 1–0 victory over AGF, partly due to a suspension to regular starter Bora Živković. In December 2004, he was sent on loan to Ølstykke FC after Herfølge had brought in Auri Skarbalius at his position. In his three years at Herfølge, he made seven appearances and failed to score a goal.

=== Horsens ===
On 1 September 2006, it was announced that Petersen had signed a three-year contract with AC Horsens. He made his debut for the club on 17 September 2006, as an 88th-minute substitute for Gilberto Macena in a 2–1 win over FC Midtjylland. He scored his first goal for the club in a 1–2 away win over Viborg FF.

At the start of the 2007–08 season, with Rasmus Marvits having left the club, Petersen became a regular part of the starting eleven in the Horsens first team.

=== AaB ===
On 30 June 2009, it was announced that Petersen had signed a four-year contract with AaB. He made his debut for the club on 18 October 2009, when he came on as a substitute in the 35th minute instead of Kasper Bøgelund against Randers FC. He scored his first goal for AaB – the matchwinner – in injury time against Midtjylland on 2 May 2010 as AaB won 3–2.

On 18 December 2012, it was announced that Petersen had signed a three-year extension with AaB valid until 30 June 2016.

=== OB ===
On 7 January 2016, it was announced, that Petersen had to find a new club when his contract with AaB expired at the end of the season. A few days later on 13 January, it was confirmed that Petersen had signed with OB on a free transfer, and he would start in his new club after the 2015–16 season. Petersen would be reunited with head coach Kent Nielsen, with whom he has worked together with in AC Horsens and AaB.

He announced his retirement from professional football in 2018 after having played two years for OB.

== International career ==
After Petersen joined the Danish national league team's 2009 King's Cup campaign, twice playing 90 minutes, Peter Bonde, the assistant manager of Denmark, praised him, and told he had A-national team potential.

== Honours ==
=== Club ===
AaB

- Danish Superliga: 2013–14
- Danish Cup: 2013–14
