= Anders Thomsen (footballer) =

Danish footballer (born 1995)

Personal information
- Full name: Anders Christian Thomsen
- Date of birth: 29 July 1995 (age 31)
- Place of birth: Denmark
- Height: 1.85 m (6 ft 1 in)
- Position: Midfielder

Youth career
- Fjordager IF
- FC Fyn
- 2012–2014: OB

Senior career*
Years	Team	Apps	(Gls)
2014–2016	OB	3	(0)
2016–2017	Middelfart	9	(1)
2017–2018	Marienlyst	42	(10)
2018	B.93	5	(2)
2019	Skovshoved	9	(1)

International career
2010–2011	Denmark U16	5	(1)
2011–2012	Denmark U17	9	(3)
2012–2013	Denmark U18	4	(0)

Managerial career
- 2022–202?: OKS (assistant)
- * Club domestic league appearances and goals

Anders Christian Thomsen (born 29 July 1995) is a Danish retired footballer who played as a midfielder and current assistant coach of OKS.

== Youth career ==
Thomsen started playing football at Fjordager IF, before moving to FC Fyn where he already at the age of 16, was playing on the under-19 team. Thomsen played several games for the youth national teams of Denmark at a young age, and was in April 2010 (at the age of 15) tested by Blackburn Rovers together with two other youth players from FC Fyn.

Thomsen joined OB at the age of 16 from FC Fyn, and started playing with the under-19 squad.

== Club career ==
=== OB ===
At the age of 19, Thomsen got promoted to Odense Boldklub's first team squad in March 2014 and also signed a full time contract senior contract with OB.

Thomsen got his debut for OB on 18 May 2014. Thomsen started on the bench, but replaced Martin Spelmann in the 92nd minute in a 2–3 defeat against FC Copenhagen in the Danish Superliga.

Thomsen signed a new one-year contract with OB on 6 June 2015.

=== Later career ===
On 22 June 2016, it was announced, that Thomsen had signed a contract with Danish 2nd Division team, Middelfart G&BK.

Thomsen joined BK Marienlyst in the start of 2017. He signed a contract with the club on 20 December 2016. He played his first league match for the club on 18 March 2017 against Brabrand IF.

Thomsen signed for B.93 in the Danish 2nd Division on 21 June 2018, but was released after five league games on 13 September 2018. The reason behind the release was, that Thomsen wanted to focus on his career as a banker.

=== Retirement ===
After a short spell with Skovshoved IF in the beginning of 2019, Thomsen had an accident that put an end to his career. During a concert in the summer of 2019, Thomsen sat on the shoulders of a friend, then fell and hit his head on the ground. The fall resulted in a severe concussion, which left him unable to play football due to severe after-effects and pain, why he decided to retire at the age of 24.

On 14 January 2022, 26-year old Thomsen was appointed assistant coach of Odense Kammeraternes Sportsklub, commonly known as OKS.
