= Nicolaj Ritter =

Danish footballer (born 1992)

Personal information
- Full name: Nicolaj Ritter
- Date of birth: 8 May 1992 (age 34)
- Place of birth: Brovst, Denmark
- Height: 1.80 m (5 ft 11 in)
- Position: Left-back

Youth career
- Arentsminde IF
- Brovst IF
- Jetsmark IF
- AaB
- 2007–2011: Midtjylland
- 2011–2012: Silkeborg

Senior career*
Years	Team	Apps	(Gls)
2011–2016	Silkeborg	127	(3)
2016–2018	SønderjyskE	13	(0)
2018	Vejle	6	(0)
2018–2024	Fredericia	144	(6)

International career
2007–2008	Denmark U-16	4	(0)
2008–2009	Denmark U-17	15	(1)
2009–2010	Denmark U-18	11	(0)
2010–2011	Denmark U-19	5	(1)
2012	Denmark U-20	3	(0)
2013–2014	Denmark U-21	2	(0)
- * Club domestic league appearances and goals

Nicolaj Ritter (born 8 May 1992 in Brovst, Denmark) is a Danish retired footballer.

== Club career ==
=== Silkeborg IF ===
On 17 May 2011 it was confirmed, that Ritter had joined Silkeborg IF on a 2-year deal.

He started playing a year with the U19 team, but already in the first match of the season, Ritter got his debut against his former club FC Midtjylland on 17 July 2011, where he replaces Christian Holst in the 76th minute.

On 17 May 2013, Ritter got renewed his contract until the summer 2014.

=== SønderjyskE ===
On 8 June 2016 it was confirmed, that Ritter had signed a two-year contract with SønderjyskE.

=== Vejle Boldklub ===
On 31 January 2018, Ritter signed for Vejle Boldklub, after getting his contract with SønderjyskE terminated. After only a half season, Vejle announced, that Ritter alongside two teammates would leave the club at the end of the season.

=== FC Fredericia ===
On 5 July 2018, Ritter signed for FC Fredericia.

On 21 May 2024 Fredericia confirmed that their captain Ritter, after 155 games for the club, had decided to end his career after the end of the current season.
