= Yao Dieudonne =

Ivorian footballer (born 1997)

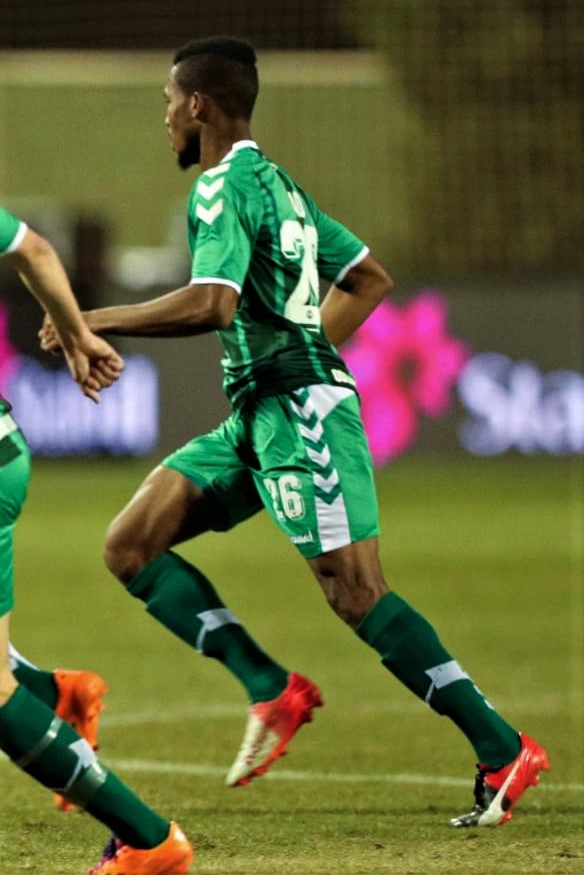

Personal information
- Full name: Yao Kouassi Dieudonne
- Date of birth: 14 February 1997 (age 29)
- Place of birth: Ivory Coast
- Height: 1.78 m (5 ft 10 in)
- Position: Striker

Youth career
- 2016: OB

Senior career*
Years	Team	Apps	(Gls)
2016–2019	OB	19	(0)
2017–2018	→ Vendsyssel (loan)	14	(3)
2019–2022	Thisted	65	(34)
2022–2023	Kolding	29	(11)
2023–2025	Skive	41	(5)
- * Club domestic league appearances and goals as of 1 July 2025

Yao Kouassi Dieudonne (born 14 May 1997) is an Ivorian footballer who plays as a striker.

== Club career ==
=== OB ===
Yao went on a trial at OB in the autumn 2015. That went successfully, and he was offered a contract.

Yao got his debut on 15 May 2016 against Hobro IK in the Danish Superliga, that OB lost 0–1. He came on the pitch in the 82nd minute, where he replaced Mikkel Desler. He was moved up to the first team squad in the summer 2016, after playing a half year at the U19 squad. In November 2016, his contract got extended until 2020.

=== Thisted FC ===
In September 2019, Yao joined Danish third tier club Thisted FC and a few days later, scored two goals in his debut in a 4–0 win.

=== Later years ===
In July 2022, Yao moved to Kolding IF. A year later, in August 2023, he moved to Skive IK. He left Skive in June 2025.
