= Thomas Kortegaard =

Danish footballer (born 1984)

Personal information
- Full name: Thomas Kortegaard
- Date of birth: 2 July 1984 (age 42)
- Place of birth: Denmark
- Height: 1.77 m (5 ft 10 in)
- Position: Midfielder

Youth career
- 1989–2000: Thisted FC
- 2001–200?: AaB

Senior career*
Years	Team	Apps	(Gls)
2003–2007	AaB	72	(2)
2003–2004	→ FC Nordjylland (loan)		
2007–2019	AC Horsens	281	(14)

International career
2001	Denmark U–17	2	(0)
2002–2003	Denmark U–19	9	(0)
2003–2004	Denmark U–20	4	(0)

Managerial career
- 2019–2020: AC Horsens (assistant)
- * Club domestic league appearances and goals

Thomas Kortegaard (born 2 July 1984) is a Danish former footballer who played as a midfielder.

He played most of his career for AC Horsens.

== Club career ==
=== AaB ===
On 14 July 2003, Kortegaard was loaned out to FC Nordjylland. Kortegaard was moved up to the first team in the summer 2004. He played a big role on the team though his young age, and the club extended his contract in May 2006 until the summer 2007. However, in 2007, the club didn't wanted to extend his contract further and he left the club.

=== AC Horsens ===
Just few hours after leaving AaB, it was announced, that Kortegaard had signed a two-year contract with AC Horsens. He got a new contract in May 2008.

== Coaching career ==
Kortegaard announced his retirement on 16 August 2019 because he was struggling with aftermaths from a cancer operation and thus stopped his career. He became a part of Bo Henriksen's first team staff at AC Horsens instead. He left the position on 29 June 2020 because he was going to be a teacher at a sports school.
