= Ryan Laursen =

Danish-American footballer (born 1992)

Personal information
- Full name: Ryan Johnson Laursen
- Date of birth: 14 April 1992 (age 34)
- Place of birth: Los Angeles, California, United States
- Height: 1.85 m (6 ft 1 in)
- Position: Right-back

Youth career
- 2005–2007: Skjold Birkerød
- 2007–2010: Lyngby

Senior career*
Years	Team	Apps	(Gls)
2010–2013	Lyngby	23	(0)
2013–2017	Esbjerg	59	(1)
2017–2022	OB	100	(4)
2022	SønderjyskE	8	(0)
2023–2024	B.93	9	(0)
Total		199	(5)

International career
2010–2011	Denmark U19	9	(0)
2011	Denmark U20	2	(0)
2013	Denmark U21	5	(0)
- * Club domestic league appearances and goals

Ryan Johnson Laursen (born 14 April 1992) is a Danish former professional footballer who played as a right-back.

== Career ==
Coming to Lyngby from Birkerød in 2007 as a youngster, his impressive displays for the Lyngby youth teams was awarded his first professional contract in October 2010.

Following impressive displays for Lyngby in the Danish 1st Division and for the Danish U21 team, he was under the monitor for Superliga clubs Esbjerg fB and FC Nordsjælland.

On 2 September, the last day of the Danish transfer window, Laursen transferred to Esbjerg for an undisclosed fee. At Esbjerg, he would be reunited with his former Lyngby manager Niels Frederiksen.

The American born full back departed the club midway through the 2016–17 season to join Odense Boldklub. In July 2022, Laursen joined SønderjyskE on a deal for the rest of 2022. He left the club again at the end of the year.

In February 2023, 30-year-old Laursen confirmed that he had decided to end his career. However, Laursen chose to kickstart his career again at the end of August 2023 when he signed with Danish 1st Division side B.93. At the end of the 2023–24 season, Laursen hung up his boots for the second time, announcing his retirement once again.
