= Randers Stadium =

Football stadium in Denmark

Cepheus Park Randers
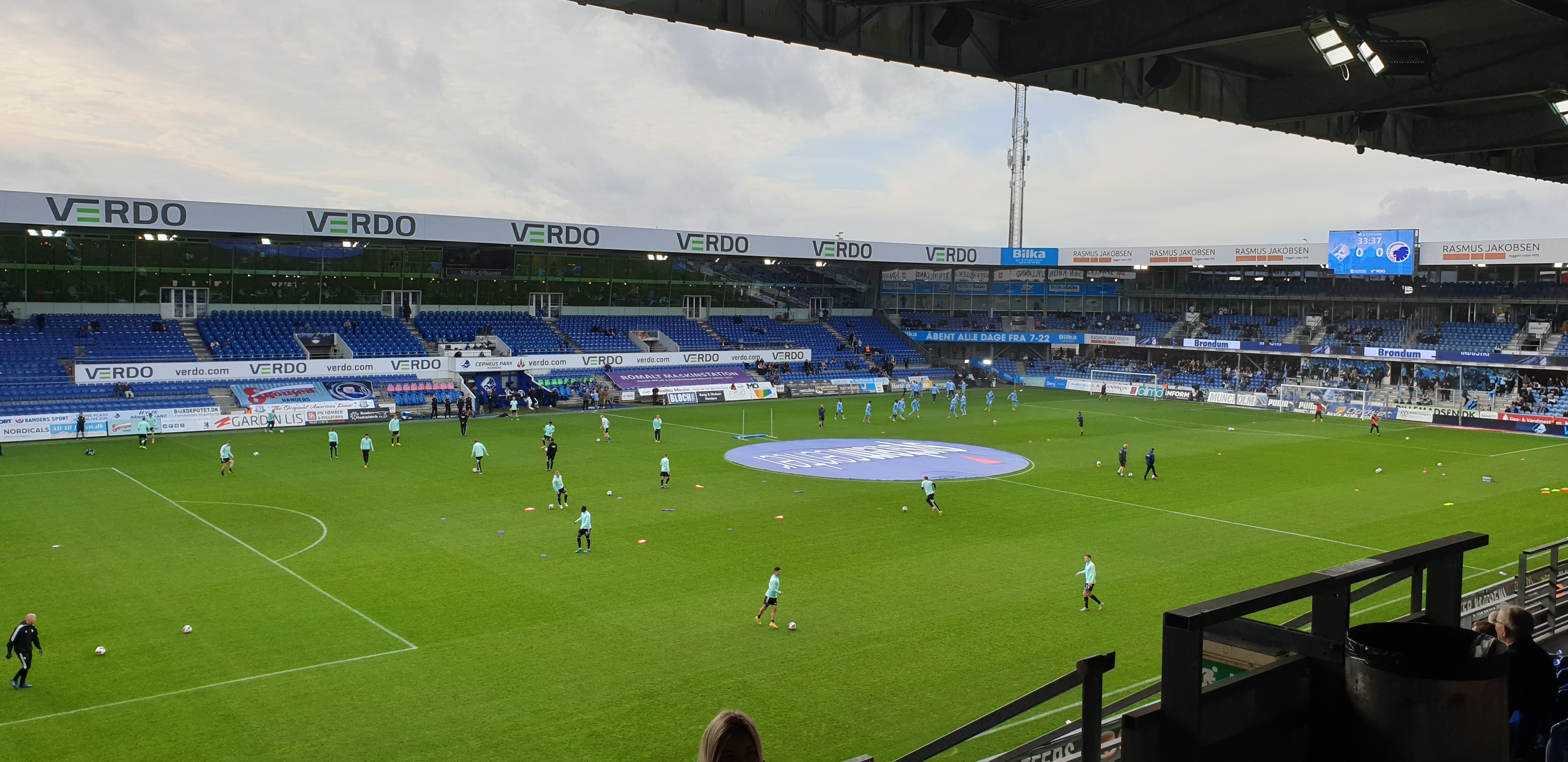
- Interactive map of Cepheus Park Randers
- Full name: Cepheus Park Randers
- Former names: Randers Stadion; Essex Park Randers; AutoC Park Randers; BioNutria Park Randers
- Location: Viborgvej 92A; 8920 Randers NV
- Coordinates: 56°27′57″N 10°00′37″E
- Owner: Randers Municipality
- Operator: Randers FC
- Capacity: 10,300
- Surface: Grass
- Scoreboard: 2
- Record attendance: 17,200 (Denmark B vs. Sweden B, 26 October 1958); After 2006: 11,824 (Randers FC vs. Brøndby IF, 16 May 2010); After 2012: 9,947 (Randers FC vs. Aarhus GF, 06 October 2019)
- Field size: 102 X 65 m

Construction
- Built: 1961
- Renovated: 2006 and 2012
- Architect: C. F. Møller
- Structural engineer: Rambøll
- General contractor: A. Enggaard

Tenants
- Randers FC (Danish Superliga) (2002–present); Randers Freja (1961–2002)

Randers Stadium (Danish: Randers Stadion), known as Cepheus Park Randers for sponsorship reasons (formerly BioNutria Park Randers, Essex Park Randers and AutoC Park Randers), is a football stadium located in Randers, Denmark. It is the home ground of Randers FC.

== Rebuilding ==
Randers Stadion was rebuilt in 2005–06. The new stadium was designed by Arkitektfirmaet C. F. Møller, while Rambøll was the engineer and A. Enggaard contractor.

The pitch was also renovated in 2006 installing under-pitch heating, and automatic watering systems.

In October 2007 Randers FC installed a 37-square metre jumboscreen at the top of the North Stand.

The stadium's official capacity is 10,300 of which 9,000 are seats.

The north stand was the only stand, not to be renovated in the 2006 rebuild, but in 2012 Randers FC announced that the North Stand would be renovated. The North Stand would be finished in the start of the season 2013–14. The North Stand was designed by Friis & Moltke, while Grontmij was the consultative engineers and Einar Kornerup contractor.

The stadium consists of 4 stands:

- Two long-side stands:
  - The Sparekassen Kronjylland stand (2,697 seats)
  - The Energi Randers stand (2,407 seats)
- Two end stands:
  - The Marcus stand (1,011 seats and 2,886 standing places)
  - The North stand (2,400 seats and 400 standing places)

== Other activities ==
In October 2006, the stadium hosted the WUSV 2006 Schutzhund World Championship.

Aerosmith performed at the stadium during their 2007 World Tour on 6 June 2007, with 23,000 people in attendance.

=== National games ===
Bionutria Park Randers has never been used as home ground for the Danish national team, but it has been venue of several youth national matches:

Date	Home team	Res.	Away team	Competition	Spectators
5 October 1952	Denmark B	2–0	Finland B	Friendly match	14,000
10 October 1954	Denmark U-21	1–3	Sweden U-21	Friendly match	9,876
26 October 1958	Denmark B	3–3	Sweden B	Friendly match	17,200
6 September 1964	Denmark U-21	3–2	Finland U-21	Friendly match	5,100
21 June 1966	Denmark U-21	1–2	Netherlands U-21	Friendly match	4,300
24 June 1970	Denmark U-21	1–1	Sweden U-21	Friendly match	3,000
8 May 1973	Denmark U-23	0–2	West Germany U-23	1974 UEFA European U-23 Football Championship qualifying	4,500
27 March 2017	Denmark U-21	0-4	England U21	Friendly match	5,367

== See also ==
- List of football stadiums in Denmark
