= Andreas Bruhn =

Danish footballer (born 1994)

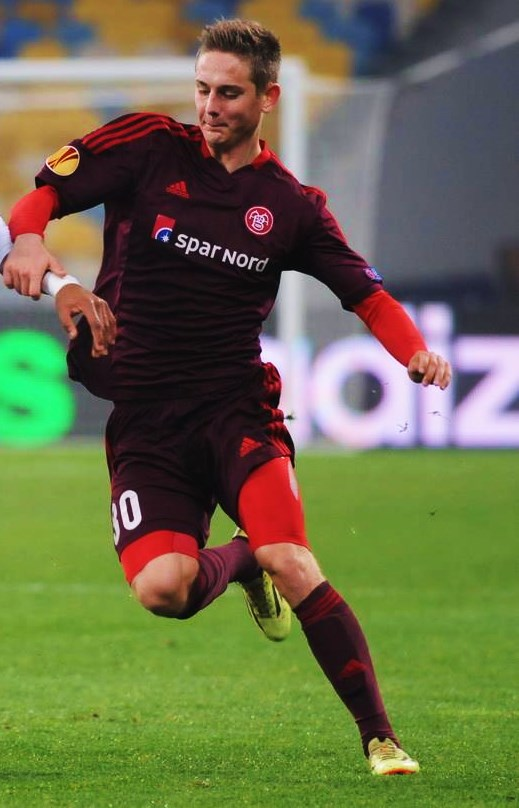
- Bruhn playing for AaB in 2014

Personal information
- Full name: Andreas Bruhn Christensen
- Date of birth: 17 February 1994 (age 32)
- Place of birth: Støvring, Denmark
- Height: 1.85 m (6 ft 1 in)
- Position: Midfielder

Youth career
- Byrsted Hjeds IF
- –2008: Støvring IF
- 2008–2013: AaB

Senior career*
Years	Team	Apps	(Gls)
2013–2016	AaB	34	(2)
2016–2017	Viborg	13	(0)
2017–2019	Randers	23	(0)
2019–2020	Arendal	14	(1)
2020–2021	Jammerbugt	0	(0)

International career
2012	Denmark U18	9	(0)
2012–2013	Denmark U19	3	(0)
2013	Denmark U20	5	(1)
2015	Denmark U21	1	(0)
- * Club domestic league appearances and goals as of 12:13, 24 May 2021 (UTC)

Andreas Bruhn Christensen (born 17 February 1994) is a Danish former professional footballer who played as a midfielder.

Bruhn also represented Denmark at several youth levels up to under-21.

== Club career ==
Bruhn played for childhood club Støvring IF, before moving to AaB when he was 14 years old. During the autumn holidays of 2008, Bruhn, together with teammates from AaB, Lucas Andersen and Viktor Ahlmann, participated in a trial at Premier League club Liverpool. In the summer of 2013, Bruhn was promoted to AaB's first-team squad together with Christian Rye, Jakob Blåbjerg and Lukas Spalvis. He made his debut for the club in the Danish Superliga on 17 August 2013, when he came on as a substitute for Anders Due in a match against Nordsjælland.

On 27 June 2016, Bruhn signed with Viborg FF on a free transfer and was given a two-year contract. He made his debut in the Superliga for Viborg on 15 July, when he was in the starting lineup in a 0–4 loss at home to Nordsjælland. On 1 February 2017, it was announced that Bruhn, together with Aleksandar Stankov, had not been registered on the club's player list after the transfer window expired, and therefore would not be able to make any official appearances in the spring. Shortly afterwards, Viborg FF terminated his contract, after only six months at the club.

On 16 February 2017, Randers FC signed Bruhn to a six-month contract. He made his debut for Randers on 24 February 2017, when he came on as a substitute after 70 minutes af a replacement for Joel Allansson in a 0–2 defeat at home to FC Midtjylland. During his first half season at the club he made 11 appearances, and his contract was extended by another two years. In the run-up to the 2017–18 season, Bruhn suffered a minor injury in his achilles tendon, which sidelined him for the first five matches of the season. After head coach Ólafur Kristjánsson was replaced by Ricardo Moniz, Bruhn saw his playing time diminish, thus only made four appearances in the first half of the season – all as a substitute.

Bruhn left Randers on 31 January 2019 on the last day of the transfer window, as he had no prospect of playing time in the spring of 2019. After being a free agent for a few months, he moved to Norwegian club Arendal in April 2019, who at the time competed in the third-tier 2. divisjon. He later suffered a hip injury and was injured for nine months.

In September 2020, he joined third-tier Danish 2nd Division club Jammerbugt FC. He left at the end of the season.

== International career ==
Bruhn has been capped for several Denmark national youth teams, most notably at under-18 level, where he made nine appearances. He has been capped once at under-21 level, in a friendly on 27 March 2015 against Turkey at Recep Tayyip Erdoğan Stadium, where he came on as a substitute in the 89th minute for Riza Durmisi as Denmark lost 2–0.

== Honours ==
=== Club ===
AaB

- Danish Superliga: 2013–14
- Danish Cup: 2013–14
