= Rasmus Jönsson =

Swedish footballer (born 1990)

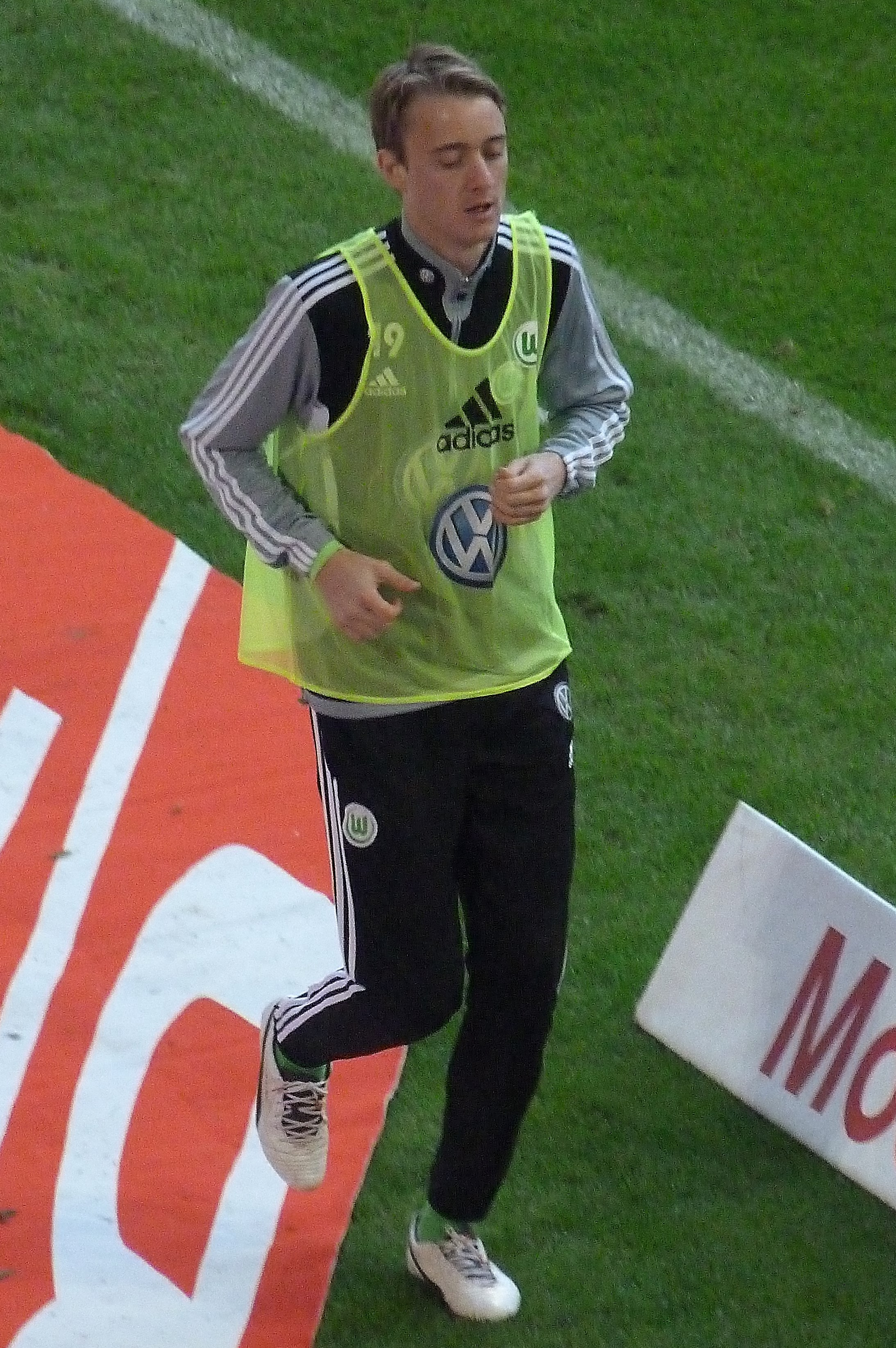

Personal information
- Full name: Richard Rasmus Jönsson
- Date of birth: 27 January 1990 (age 36)
- Place of birth: Viken, Sweden
- Height: 1.92 m (6 ft 3 1/2 in)
- Position: Striker

Youth career
- –2007: Helsingborgs IF

Senior career*
Years	Team	Apps	(Gls)
2007–2011	Helsingborgs IF	97	(27)
2011–2014	VfL Wolfsburg	17	(0)
2013	→ FSV Frankfurt (loan)	6	(1)
2013–2014	→ AaB (loan)	19	(6)
2014–2016	AaB	56	(12)
2016–2018	OB	56	(8)
2018-2019	Helsingborgs IF	28	(9)
2019–2019	Buriram United	12	(1)
2020–2023	Helsingborgs IF	89	(6)

International career
2007	Sweden U17	3	(2)
2008–2009	Sweden U19	15	(8)
2009–2012	Sweden U21	23	(4)
2011	Sweden	2	(0)
- * Club domestic league appearances and goals as of 15 November 2023

Rasmus Jönsson (Swedish pronunciation: [ˈrǎsːmɵs ˈjœ̌nːsɔn]; born 27 January 1990) is a Swedish professional footballer who is normally deployed as a second striker.

== Career ==
=== Helsingborgs IF ===
He plays as a striker and got his breakthrough in 2008, scoring four goals in Allsvenskan alongside Henrik Larsson in Helsingborgs IF. Jönsson is commonly called "Sugröret", meaning the drinking straw, among his teammates. During the season 2010 in Allsvenskan, Helsingborgs IF Finished in second place just two points short of Malmö FF. Helsingborg however didn't allow this to let them down after a good season and finished it off on a high winning the Svenska Cupen in a final against Hammarby IF with Rasmus scoring the only goal in the game late on. On 29 August 2011, Helsingborgs IF confirmed that a deal had been agreed for Jönsson to join Bundesliga side VfL Wolfsburg on a four-year deal. Jönsson said that he was sad to leave Helsingborg but happy to take an important step forward in his career.

=== VfL Wolfsburg ===
On 11 September 2011, Rasmus Jönsson made his Bundesliga debut from start against Schalke 04 and he assisted for Mario Mandžukić's second goal. Jönsson played 90 minutes before being substituted.

==== Loan to FSV Frankfurt ====
On 29 January 2013, it was announced that Jönsson would join FSV Frankfurt on loan for the rest of the season.

=== AaB ===
On 9 August 2013, it was announced that Jönsson would join the Danish Superliga club AaB on a loan spell for the 2013/2014 season. On Sunday 6 October he scored twice against Viborg. On 21 July 2014, it was announced that Jönsson joined AaB on a permanent two-year basis. Jönsson got shirt number 10.

=== OB ===
In the Summer of 2016, Jönsson signed with the Danish club OB. In OB he was reunited with head coach Kent Nielsen. Nielsen was head coach in AaB when Jönsson joined the club before the 2013-14 season.

=== Buriram United ===
On 2 July 2019 it was announced he had signed a deal with Buriram United in Thai League 1 until 30 November 2022. On the same day he traveled with his new teammates to their away fixture against JL Chiangmai United F.C. in the Thai League Cup. His team won 2–1 and Jönsson provided an assist.

== Honours ==
Helsingborgs IF

- Svenska Cupen: 2010

AaB

- Danish Superliga: 2013–14
- Danish Cup: 2013–14
