= Mathias Thrane =

Danish footballer (born 1993)

Personal information
- Full name: Mathias Thrane
- Date of birth: 4 September 1993 (age 33)
- Place of birth: Denmark
- Height: 1.83 m (6 ft 0 in)
- Position: Midfielder

Team information
- Current team: FB (transition coach)

Youth career
- HIK

Senior career*
Years	Team	Apps	(Gls)
2012–2014	HIK		
2014–2016	AaB	8	(1)
2016–2018	OB	32	(1)
2019–2020	Nykøbing	37	(1)
2020	Frem	2	(0)
2021–2022	B36 Tórshavn	25	(3)
2022	Næstved	0	(0)
2022–2023	HIK	16	(0)
2023–	FB		

Managerial career
- 2023–: FB (transition coach)
- * Club domestic league appearances and goals

Mathias Thrane (born 4 September 1993) is a Danish retired professional footballer who played as a midfielder.

== Career ==
Thrane joined AaB in the summer of 2014 from Hellerup IK. He got his Danish Superliga debut on 19 July 2014 against SønderjyskE when he was substituted in for Thomas Enevoldsen in the 75th minute.

Thrane played two years in AaB before signing with the competitors from OB.

On 4 February 2019, Nykøbing FC announced the signing of Thrane. He left the club in the summer 2020.

After a spell at Faroese club B36 Tórshavn, Thrane returned to Denmark at the end of February 2022, when he signed for Næstved Boldklub. In July 2022, he returned to his former club, HIK.

In July 2023, Thrane joined FB where he would serve as a transition coach and youth coach.
