= 2012–13 AaB Fodbold season =

AaB
2012–13 season
- Sports Director: Lynge Jakobsen
- Head Coach: Kent Nielsen
- Stadium: Nordjyske Arena
- Danish Superliga: 5th
- Danish Cup: Fourth round
- Top goalscorer: League: Nicklas Helenius (16); All: Nicklas Helenius (18)
- Highest home attendance: 10,794 vs Randers (20 May 2013, Danish Superliga)
- Lowest home attendance: 4,019 vs Esbjerg (9 March 2013, Danish Superliga)
- Average home league attendance: 6,896
Home colours	Away colours

The 2012–2013 season is AaB's 30th consecutive season in the top flight of Danish football, 23rd consecutive season in the Danish Superliga, and 127th year in existence as a football club.

== Month by Month review ==
Month	G	W	D	L	GF	GA	GD	GFA	GAA	Pts per G	Max Pts	Pts	Pts Diff	DSL Rnk
July	3	1	1	1	3	5	-2	1	1.67	1.34	9	4	5	8
August	5	4	1	0	16	2	+14	3.2	0.4	2.6	15	13	2	2
September	3	1	0	2	5	4	+1	1.67	1.34	1	9	3	6	2
October	3	2	0	1	5	3	+2	1.67	1	2	9	6	3	2
November	4	2	0	2	4	7	-3	1	1.75	1.5	12	6	6	3
December	1	0	0	1	0	3	-3	0	3	0	3	0	3	3
March	4	0	3	1	6	7	-1	1.5	1.75	0.75	12	3	9	4
April	6	3	1	2	9	8	+1	1.5	1.34	1.67	18	10	8	3
May	4	0	2	2	3	7	-4	0.75	1.75	0.5	12	2	10	5
Total	33	13	8	12	51	46	+5	1.55	1.39	1.42	99	47	52	5

== Club ==
=== Coaching staff ===
Position	Staff
Head coach	(Denmark) Kent Nielsen
Assistant coach	(Denmark) Allan Kuhn
Development Manager – AaB Fodbold	(Denmark) Poul Erik Andreasen
Goalkeeping coach	(Denmark) Poul Buus
Team Leader	(Denmark) Ernst Damborg
Doctor	(Denmark) Søren Kaalund
Physiotherapist	(Denmark) Morten Skjoldager
Physical trainer	(England) Ashley Tootle
Sports Psychology consultant	(Denmark) Martin Langagergaard
U/19 League coach	(Denmark) Jacob Friis
U/17 League coach	(Denmark) Lars Knudsen

Source: AaB Fodbold

=== Other information ===
Owner	(Denmark) AaB A/S
Chief Executive	(Denmark) Lynge Jakobsen
Sports Director	(Denmark) Lynge Jakobsen
Ground (capacity and dimensions)	Nordjyske Arena (13,800 / 105x70 metres)
Training ground	AaB Training Centre

Source: AaB Fodbold

== First team squad ==
As of 18 May 2014.

Squad No.	Name	Nationality	Position(s)	Since	Date of birth (age)	Signed from	Games played	Goals scored
Goalkeepers
1	Nicolai Larsen	(Denmark)	GK	2010	9 March 1991 (age 34)	(Denmark) Lyngby Boldklub	106	0
22	Carsten Christensen	(Denmark)	GK	2011	28 August 1986 (age 39)	(Denmark) FC Fredericia	3	0
Defenders
3	Jakob Ahlmann	(Denmark)	LB / LWB	2009	18 January 1991 (age 35)	(Denmark) Midtjylland	84	2
4	Lasse Nielsen	(Denmark)	CB / RB	2006	8 January 1988 (age 38)	(Denmark) AaB Academy	174	10
5	Kenneth Emil Petersen	(Denmark)	CB	2009	15 January 1985 (age 41)	(Denmark) AC Horsens	130	9
20	Henrik Dalsgaard	(Denmark)	RB / RM / RW	2009	27 July 1989 (age 36)	(Denmark) Møldrup/Tostrup	137	9
26	Rasmus Thelander	(Denmark)	CB	2012	7 September 1991 (age 34)	(Denmark) AB	43	2
31	Jakob Blåbjerg	(Denmark)	CB / LB	2013	11 January 1995 (age 31)	(Denmark) AaB Academy	1	0
32	Kasper Pedersen	(Denmark)	CB / RB	2013	13 January 1993 (age 33)	(Denmark) AaB Academy	8	2
Midfielders
2	Patrick Kristensen	(Denmark)	LB / RB / CM / RM / RW	2006	28 April 1987 (age 38)	(Denmark) AaB Academy	228	9
7	Anders Due	(Denmark)	CM / LM / RM / LW	2008	17 March 1982 (age 43)	(Netherlands) Vitesse Arnhem	188	18
8	Rasmus Würtz (VC)	(Denmark)	CM / DM	2009	18 September 1983 (age 42)	(Denmark) Copenhagen	343	19
9	Thomas Augustinussen (C)	(Denmark)	CM / DM	2011	20 March 1981 (age 44)	(Austria) Red Bull Salzburg	376	43
14	Mathias Wichmann	(Denmark)	CM / AM	2009	6 August 1991 (age 34)	(Denmark) AaB Academy	110	4
17	Kasper Kusk	(Denmark)	CM / LM / RM / LW / RW	2010	10 November 1991 (age 34)	(Denmark) AaB Academy	88	26
23	Nicolaj Thomsen	(Denmark)	CM / AM	2011	8 May 1993 (age 32)	(Denmark) AaB Academy	67	5
28	Hallur Hansson	(Faroe Islands)	CM	2012	8 July 1992 (age 33)	(Faroe Islands) HB Tórshavn	6	0
Forwards
10	Jeppe Curth	(Denmark)	AM / CF	2005	21 March 1984 (age 41)	(Netherlands) Feyenoord	283	65
11	Nicklas Helenius	(Denmark)	CF	2010	8 May 1991 (age 34)	(Denmark) AaB Academy	102	40
19	Søren Frederiksen	(Denmark)	CF / LW	2013	8 July 1989 (age 36)	(Denmark) Copenhagen	39	5
29	Rolf Toft	(Denmark)	CF	2011	4 August 1992 (age 33)	(Denmark) AaB Academy	25	1
30	Kayke	(Brazil)	CF	2011	1 April 1988 (age 37)	(Brazil) Vila Nova	35	6

Source: AaB Fodbold website

== Transfers and loans ==
=== In ===
==== Summer ====
Squad #	Position	Player	Transferred from	Fee	Date	Source
26	CB	(Denmark) Rasmus Thelander	(Denmark) AB	Free transfer	14 June 2012	

==== Winter ====
Squad #	Position	Player	Transferred from	Fee	Date	Source
28	CM	(Faroe Islands) Hallur Hansson	(Faroe Islands) HB Tórshavn	Free transfer	29 January 2013	
19	ST	(Denmark) Søren Frederiksen	(Denmark) Copenhagen	Free transfer	31 January 2013	

=== Out ===
==== Summer ====
Squad #	Position	Player	Transferred To	Fee	Date	Source
15	CB	(Faroe Islands) Pól Jóhannus Justinussen	(Faroe Islands) NSÍ Runavík	Free transfer	31 June 2012	
	LB	(Denmark) Jacob Barrett Laursen	(Italy) Juventus	£0.82 million	1 July 2012	
18	AM	(Denmark) Lucas Andersen	(Netherlands) Ajax	£1.03 million	31 August 2012	

==== Winter ====
Squad #	Position	Player	Transferred To	Fee	Date	Source
16	RB	(Denmark) Kasper Bøgelund	Retirement		31 December 2012	
21	CB	(Denmark) Nicholas Gotfredsen	(Denmark) Viborg	Free transfer	1 February 2013	

=== Loan in ===
Squad #	Position	Player	Loaned From	Start	End	Source
28	CM	(Faroe Islands) Hallur Hansson	(Faroe Islands) HB Tórshavn	3 September 2012	31 December 2012	

=== Overall transfer activity ===
==== Spending ====
Summer: £0

Winter: £0

Total: £0

==== Income ====
Summer: ▲£1,850,000

Winter: £0

Total: ▲£1,850,000

==== Expenditure ====
Summer: ▲£1,850,000

Winter: £0

Total: ▲£1,850,000

== Friendlies ==
=== Pre-season ===
20 June 2012 Friendly	Sønderup/Suldrup IK Frem (Denmark)	0 – 3	(Denmark) AaB	Suldrup, Denmark
18:30 CEST		Report	Enekci 58'; Pedersen 68'; Kristensen 80'	Stadium: Suldrup Stadion

22 June 2012 Friendly	Bangsbo Freja (Denmark)	0 – 7	(Denmark) AaB	Frederikshavn, Denmark
18:30 CEST		Report	Toft 19', 35'; 24' (o.g.); Kusk 30'; Andersen 48', 85'; Helenius 83'	Stadium: Bangsbo Stadion

28 June 2012 Friendly	Randers (Denmark)	0 – 2	(Denmark) AaB	Randers, Denmark
16:00 CEST		Report	Kusk 55'; Curth 74'	Stadium: AutoC Park Randers

4 July 2012 Friendly	AaB (Denmark)	3 – 2	(Denmark) Vejle Kolding	Aalborg, Denmark
16:00 CEST	Helenius 16', 23'; Wichmann 41'	Report	Albers 42'; Kronborg 72'	Stadium: Nordjyske Arena

7 July 2012 Friendly	AC Horsens (Denmark)	2 – 1	(Denmark) AaB	Horsens, Denmark
13:00 CEST	Fagerberg 14', 53'	Report	Toft 64'	Stadium: CASA Arena Horsens

=== Mid-season ===
25 January 2013 Friendly	Vejle Kolding (Denmark)	2 – 2	(Denmark) AaB	Vejle, Denmark
13:00 CET	Agger 3'; Sivebæk 6'	Report	Curth 24', 45'	Stadium: Vejle Stadion

1 February 2013 Friendly	AaB (Denmark)	1 – 0	(Denmark) Hobro IK	Aalborg, Denmark
17:00 CET	Kayke 5'	Report		Stadium: Nordjyske Arena

3 February 2013 Friendly	FC Hjørring (Denmark)	0 – 2	(Denmark) AaB	Hjørring, Denmark
11:00 CET		Report	Due 51'; Toft 78'	Stadium: Hjørring Stadium

8 February 2013 Friendly	AaB (Denmark)	1 – 1	(Denmark) Viborg	Aalborg, Denmark
13:00 CET	Kusk 49'	Report	Perch-Nielsen 69'	Stadium: Nordjyske Arena

15 February 2013 Friendly	AaB (Denmark)	3 – 0	(Sweden) IF Elfsborg	Faro, Portugal
21:00 CET	Helenius 41'; Frederiksen 60'; Kusk 74'	Report		Stadium: Estádio Algarve

18 February 2013 Friendly	AaB (Denmark)	3 – 3	(Sweden) Helsingborgs IF	Albufeira, Portugal
14:00 CET	Frederiksen 25'; Curth 74'; Wichmann 80'	Report	Lindström 39'; Gashi 45'; Accam 46'	Stadium: Estádio Municipal de Albufeira

23 February 2013 Friendly	Randers (Denmark)	1 – 0	(Denmark) AaB	Randers, Denmark
14:00 CET	Schwartz 21'	Report		Stadium: AutoC Park Randers

== Competitions ==
=== Competition record ===
Competition	Record							
Competition	G	W	D	L	GF	GA	GD	Win %
Danish Superliga	33	13	8	12	51	46	+5	39.39
Danish Cup	3	2	1	0	6	1	+5	66.67
Total	36	15	9	12	57	47	+10	41.67

=== Danish Superliga ===
==== League table ====
Pos	Team	Pld	W	D	L	GF	GA	GD	Pts	Qualification or relegation
3	Randers FC	33	15	7	11	36	42	−6	52	Qualification for the Europa League third qualifying round
4	Esbjerg fB	33	13	8	12	38	32	+6	47	Qualification for the Europa League play-off round
5	AaB	33	13	8	12	51	46	+5	47	Qualification for the Europa League second qualifying round
6	Midtjylland	33	12	11	10	51	47	+4	47	
7	AGF	33	11	8	14	50	49	+1	41	

Source: Danish Football Association (in Danish)
Rules for classification: 1) points; 2) goal difference; 3) number of goals scored.

===== Results summary =====
Overall								Home						Away					
Pld	W	D	L	GF	GA	GD	Pts	W	D	L	GF	GA	GD	W	D	L	GF	GA	GD
33	13	8	12	51	46	+5	47	6	6	4	22	18	+4	7	2	8	29	28	+1

Last updated: 20 May 2013.
Source: Competitive matches

===== Results by round =====
Round	1	2	3	4	5	6	7	8	9	10	11	12	13	14	15	16	17	18	19	20	21	22	23	24	25	26	27	28	29	30	31	32	33
Ground	A	H	A	H	A	H	A	A	H	H	A	A	H	A	H	A	H	A	H	H	A	H	H	A	A	H	A	H	A	A	H	A	H
Result	D	W	L	D	W	W	W	W	W	L	L	W	W	L	L	L	W	W	L	D	L	D	L	D	L	W	W	D	W	L	D	L	D
Position	6	4	8	9	6	5	3	2	2	2	2	2	2	2	3	3	3	3	3	3	4	4	4	4	5	4	4	4	3	4	4	5	5

Updated to match(es) played on 20 May 2013. Source: superstats.dk
A = Away; H = Home; W = Win; D = Draw; L = Loss

===== Matches =====
13 July 2012 1	AGF	1 – 1	AaB	Aarhus
18:30 CEST	Jørgensen 86' (pen.)	Report	Curth 90+5'	Stadium: NRGi Park; Attendance: 9,728; Referee: Michael Svendsen

22 July 2012 2	AaB	2 – 1	Brøndby	Aalborg
19:00 CEST	Andersen 56'; Helenius 67'	Report	Gehrt 48'	Stadium: Nordjyske Arena; Attendance: 7,895; Referee: Claus Bo Larsen

28 July 2012 3	Copenhagen	3 – 0	AaB	Copenhagen
15:00 CEST	Cornelius 40'; Santin 60'; Abdellaoue 90+3'	Report		Stadium: Parken; Attendance: 9,571; Referee: Henrik Kragh

4 August 2012 4	AaB	1 – 1	Nordsjælland	Aalborg
17:00 CEST	Nielsen 85'	Report	John 88'	Stadium: Nordjyske Arena; Attendance: 4,783; Referee: Kenn Hansen

12 August 2012 5	AC Horsens	1 – 4	AaB	Horsens
15:00 CEST	Fagerberg 37'	Report	Kusk 29', 31'; Helenius 38'; Wichmann 83'	Stadium: Casa Arena Horsens; Attendance: 3,532; Referee: Anders Poulsen

17 August 2012 6	AaB	3 – 0	Midtjylland	Aalborg
18:30 CEST	Helenius 20'; Nielsen 52'; Kusk 64'	Report		Stadium: Nordjyske Arena; Attendance: 6,578; Referee: Michael Svendsen

26 August 2012 7	OB	0 – 4	AaB	Odense
17:00 CEST		Report	Helenius 2' (pen.); Augustinussen 43'; Dalsgaard 44'; Andersen 63'	Stadium: TRE-FOR Park; Attendance: 9,575; Referee: Michael Johansen

31 August 2012 8	SønderjyskE	0 – 4	AaB	Haderslev
18:30 CEST		Report	Nielsen 42'; Curth 48', 56'; Kusk 87'	Stadium: Haderslev Fodboldstadion; Attendance: 2,138; Referee: Jens Maae

16 September 2012 9	AaB	4 – 0	Randers	Aalborg
17:00 CEST	Curth 20'; Kusk 27', 75'; Kayke 87'	Report		Stadium: Nordjyske Arena; Attendance: 10,107; Referee: Henning Jensen

24 September 2012 10	AaB	0 – 2	Esbjerg	Aalborg
19:00 CEST		Report	Braithwaite 60', 77'	Stadium: Nordjyske Arena; Attendance: 8,296; Referee: Mads K. Kristoffersen

30 September 2012 11	Silkeborg IF	2 – 1	AaB	Silkeborg
14:00 CEST	Kiilerich 4'; Pourié 36'	Report	Petersen 76'	Stadium: Silkeborg Stadion; Attendance: 2,998; Referee: Lars Christoffersen

7 October 2012 12	Brøndby	1 – 3	AaB	Brøndby
19:00 CEST	Makienok 77'	Report	Kusk 15'; Helenius 56', 68'	Stadium: Brøndby Stadion; Attendance: 7,070; Referee: Michael Svendsen

20 October 2012 13	AaB	2 – 1	SønderjyskE	Aalborg
17:00 CEST	Kristensen 75'; Helenius 86'	Report	Vibe (penalty missed) 9'; Lodberg 72'	Stadium: Nordjyske Arena; Attendance: 6,888; Referee: Jens Maae

26 October 2012 14	Nordsjælland	1 – 0	AaB	Farum
18:30 CEST	Okore 19'	Report		Stadium: Farum Park; Attendance: 5,423; Referee: Michael Tykgaard

5 November 2012 15	AaB	1 – 3	Midtjylland	Aalborg
19:00 CET	Kusk 44'	Report	Andersson 13'; Larsen 41'; Bak 90+3'	Stadium: Nordjyske Arena; Attendance: 6,149; Referee: Michael Johansen

11 November 2012 16	Copenhagen	4 – 0	AaB	Copenhagen
19:00 CET	Jørgensen 7', 12'; Petersen 24' (o.g.); Santin 42' (pen.)	Report		Stadium: Parken; Attendance: 12,493; Referee: Lars Christoffersen

18 November 2012 17	AaB	2 – 0	AC Horsens	Aalborg
14:00 CET	Petersen 10'; Toft 86'	Report		Stadium: Nordjyske Arena; Attendance: 5,567; Referee: Jens Maae

23 November 2012 18	Randers	0 – 1	AaB	Randers
18:30 CET		Report	Helenius 17'	Stadium: AutoC Park Randers; Attendance: 7,311; Referee: Jakob Kehlet

3 December 2012 19	AaB	0 – 3	AGF	Aalborg
19:00 CET		Report	Petersen 10'; Jóhannsson 44'; Vatsadze 85'	Stadium: Nordjyske Arena; Attendance: 4,806; Referee: Mads K. Kristoffersen

6 March 2013 20	AaB	2 – 2	OB	Aalborg
18:30 CET	Helenius 3', 37'	Report	Bodul 32'; N'Koum 90'	Stadium: Nordjyske Arena; Attendance: 4,775; Referee: Henning Jensen

1 March 2013 21	Silkeborg IF	3 – 2	AaB	Silkeborg
18:30 CET	Bech 17'; Risgård 69'; Pourié 74'	Report	Pedersen 3'; Kristensen 49'	Stadium: Silkeborg Stadion; Attendance: 3,409; Referee: Michael Tykgaard

9 March 2013 22	AaB	0 – 0	Esbjerg	Aalborg
17:00 CET		Report		Stadium: Nordjyske Arena; Attendance: 4,019; Referee: Jens Maae

4 April 2013 23	AaB	0 – 1	Nordsjælland	Aalborg
18:00 CEST		Report	Augustinussen 5' (o.g.)	Stadium: Nordjyske Arena; Attendance: 4,107; Referee: Claus Bo Larsen

28 March 2013 24	AC Horsens	2 – 2	AaB	Horsens
15:00 CET	Bjerregaard 54'; Aslam 81'	Report	Frederiksen 8'; Helenius 44'	Stadium: Casa Arena Horsens; Attendance: 3,283; Referee: Michael Johansen

1 April 2013 25	Esbjerg	1 – 0	AaB	Esbjerg
13:00 CEST	Andersen 69'	Report		Stadium: Blue Water Arena; Attendance: 6,688; Referee: Kenn Hansen

8 April 2013 26	AaB	1 – 0	Silkeborg IF	Aalborg
19:00 CEST	Helenius 47'	Report		Stadium: Nordjyske Arena; Attendance: 4,922; Referee: Jakob Kehlet

14 April 2013 27	OB	3 – 4	AaB	Odense
19:00 CEST	Larsen 39'; Pedersen 49'; Ruud 70' (pen.)	Report	Frederiksen 23', 37'; Helenius 64'; Petersen 87'	Stadium: TRE-FOR Park; Attendance: 7,624; Referee: Mads K. Kristoffersen

21 April 2013 28	AaB	1 – 1	Copenhagen	Aalborg
19:00 CEST	Helenius 41' (pen.)	Report	Bolaños 48'; Cornelius (penalty missed) 85'	Stadium: Nordjyske Arena; Attendance: 10,564; Referee: Michael Johansen

29 April 2013 29	Midtjylland	2 – 3	AaB	Herning
19:00 CEST	Duncan 11'; Igboun 37'	Report	Augustinussen 20'; Dalsgaard 61'; Wichmann 80'	Stadium: MCH Arena; Attendance: 6,391; Referee: Jens Maae

4 May 2013 30	SønderjyskE	1 – 0	AaB	Haderslev
19:00 CEST	Bechmann (penalty missed) 3'; Vibe 22'	Report		Stadium: Haderslev Fodboldstadion; Attendance: 3,623; Referee: Mads K. Kristoffersen

12 May 2013 31	AaB	1 – 1	Brøndby	Aalborg
17:00 CEST	Helenius 76'	Report	Goodson 37'	Stadium: Nordjyske Arena; Attendance: 10,092; Referee: Michael Tykgaard

16 May 2013 32	AGF	3 – 0	AaB	Aarhus
19:00 CEST	Larsen 21'; Petersen 30'; Devdariani 60'	Report		Stadium: NRGi Park; Attendance: 9,585; Referee: Anders Poulsen

20 May 2013 33	AaB	2 – 2	Randers	Aalborg
17:00 CEST	Helenius 2'; Thelander 90+2'	Report	Schwartz 61'; Nielsen 77' (o.g.)	Stadium: Nordjyske Arena; Attendance: 10,794; Referee: Mads K. Kristoffersen

=== Danish Cup ===
12 September 2012 Second round	Skovbakken IK	0 – 3	AaB	Aarhus
17:15 CEST		Report	Helenius 31'; Petersen 45+2'; Due 57'	Stadium: Vejlby Stadion; Attendance: 823; Referee: Jakob Kehlet

3 October 2012 Third round	Brønshøj Boldklub	1 – 3	AaB	Brønshøj
16:00 CEST	Bræmer 60' (pen.)	Report	Kusk 18'; Helenius 47', 76' (pen.)	Stadium: Tingbjerg Idrætspark; Attendance: 1,065; Referee: Kenn Hansen

8 November 2012 Fourth round	Esbjerg	0 – 0 (4-2 p)	AaB	Esbjerg
18:00 CEST		Report		Stadium: Blue Water Arena; Attendance: 3,181; Referee: Michael Tykgaard
	Penalties
	Ernemann (penalty scored); Smarason (penalty scored); Lange (penalty scored); Braithwaite (penalty scored)		(penalty scored) Helenius; (penalty missed) Kayke; (penalty scored) Würtz; (penalty missed) Due

== Statistics ==
=== Appearances ===
This includes all competitive matches. The list is sorted by shirt number when total appearances are equal.

Rnk	Pos	No.	Player	Superliga	Cup	Total
1	FW	11	(Denmark) Nicklas Helenius	33	3	36
2	GK	1	(Denmark) Nicolai Larsen	33	2	35
2	MF	17	(Denmark) Kasper Kusk	33	2	35
4	DF	20	(Denmark) Henrik Dalsgaard	31	3	34
5	MF	8	(Denmark) Rasmus Würtz	29	3	32
6	MF	2	(Denmark) Patrick Kristensen	28	3	31
6	DF	3	(Denmark) Jakob Ahlmann	29	2	31
6	DF	5	(Denmark) Kenneth Emil Petersen	29	2	31
9	MF	14	(Denmark) Mathias Wichmann	27	3	30
10	DF	4	(Denmark) Lasse Nielsen	28	1	29
10	MF	7	(Denmark) Anders Due	26	3	29
12	FW	10	(Denmark) Jeppe Curth	26	1	27
13	MF	9	(Denmark) Thomas Augustinussen	25	0	25
14	MF	23	(Denmark) Nicolaj Thomsen	21	3	24
15	FW	19	(Denmark) Søren Frederiksen	14	0	14
15	DF	26	(Denmark) Rasmus Thelander	11	3	14
17	FW	29	(Denmark) Rolf Toft	9	2	11
18	FW	30	(Brazil) Kayke	6	3	9
19	MF	18	(Denmark) Lucas Andersen	7	0	7
20	MF	29	(Faroe Islands) Hallur Hansson	3	2	5
21	DF	16	(Denmark) Kasper Bøgelund	4	0	4
22	DF	32	(Denmark) Kasper Pedersen	3	0	3
23	DF	21	(Denmark) Nicholas Gotfredsen	1	0	1
23	GK	22	(Denmark) Carsten Christensen	0	1	1
23	DF	32	(Denmark) Jakob Blåbjerg	1	0	1

=== Goalscorers ===
This includes all competitive matches. The list is sorted by shirt number when total goals are equal.

Rnk	Pos	No.	Player	Superliga	Cup	Total
1	FW	11	(Denmark) Nicklas Helenius	16	2	18
2	MF	17	(Denmark) Kasper Kusk	8	1	9
3	DF	5	(Denmark) Kenneth Emil Petersen	3	1	4
3	FW	10	(Denmark) Jeppe Curth	4	0	4
5	DF	4	(Denmark) Lasse Nielsen	3	0	3
5	FW	19	(Denmark) Søren Frederiksen	3	0	3
7	MF	2	(Denmark) Patrick Kristensen	2	0	2
7	MF	9	(Denmark) Thomas Augustinussen	2	0	2
7	MF	14	(Denmark) Mathias Wichmann	2	0	2
7	MF	18	(Denmark) Lucas Andersen	2	0	2
7	DF	20	(Denmark) Henrik Dalsgaard	2	0	2
12	MF	7	(Denmark) Anders Due	0	1	1
12	DF	26	(Denmark) Rasmus Thelander	1	0	1
12	FW	29	(Denmark) Rolf Toft	1	0	1
12	FW	30	(Brazil) Kayke	1	0	1
12	DF	32	(Denmark) Kasper Pedersen	1	0	1
—	Own Goals			0	0	0
TOTALS				51	6	57

=== Assists ===
This includes all competitive matches. The list is sorted by shirt number when total assists are equal.

Rnk	Pos	No.	Player	Superliga	Cup	Total
1	FW	11	(Denmark) Nicklas Helenius	7	0	7
1	MF	17	(Denmark) Kasper Kusk	7	0	7
3	MF	7	(Denmark) Anders Due	5	1	6
4	FW	10	(Denmark) Jeppe Curth	2	2	4
4	MF	23	(Denmark) Nicolaj Thomsen	4	0	4
6	MF	8	(Denmark) Rasmus Würtz	2	0	2
6	MF	14	(Denmark) Mathias Wichmann	1	1	2
6	DF	20	(Denmark) Henrik Dalsgaard	2	0	2
9	MF	2	(Denmark) Patrick Kristensen	1	0	1
9	DF	3	(Denmark) Jakob Ahlmann	1	0	1
9	DF	5	(Denmark) Kenneth Emil Petersen	1	0	1
9	MF	9	(Denmark) Thomas Augustinussen	1	0	1
9	MF	18	(Denmark) Lucas Andersen	1	0	1
9	FW	19	(Denmark) Søren Frederiksen	1	0	1
9	FW	30	(Brazil) Kayke	0	1	1
TOTALS				36	5	41

=== Clean sheets ===
This includes all competitive matches. The list is sorted by shirt number when total clean sheets are equal.

Rnk	Pos	No.	Player	Superliga	Cup	Total
1	GK	1	(Denmark) Nicolai Larsen	8	1	9
2	GK	22	(Denmark) Carsten Christensen	0	1	1
TOTALS				8	2	10

=== Disciplinary record ===
This includes all competitive matches. The list is sorted by shirt number when total cards are equal.

Rnk	Pos.	No.	Player	Superliga		Cup		Total	
Rnk	Pos.	No.	Player	Booked	Sent off (straight red)	Booked	Sent off (straight red)	Booked	Sent off (straight red)
1	MF	8	(Denmark) Rasmus Würtz	9	1	1	0	10	1
2	DF	5	(Denmark) Kenneth Emil Petersen	5	1	0	0	5	1
3	DF	3	(Denmark) Jakob Ahlmann	5	0	0	0	5	0
4	DF	4	(Denmark) Lasse Nielsen	4	0	0	0	4	0
4	MF	7	(Denmark) Anders Due	3	0	1	0	4	0
4	MF	9	(Denmark) Thomas Augustinussen	4	0	0	0	4	0
7	FW	11	(Denmark) Nicklas Helenius	2	0	0	0	2	0
7	MF	14	(Denmark) Mathias Wichmann	2	0	0	0	2	0
7	DF	20	(Denmark) Henrik Dalsgaard	2	0	0	0	2	0
10	MF	2	(Denmark) Patrick Kristensen	1	0	0	0	1	0
10	FW	10	(Denmark) Patrick Kristensen	1	0	0	0	1	0
10	MF	17	(Denmark) Kasper Kusk	1	0	0	0	1	0
10	MF	18	(Denmark) Lucas Andersen	1	0	0	0	1	0
10	DF	26	(Denmark) Rasmus Thelander	0	0	1	0	1	0
TOTALS				40	2	3	0	43	2

=== Summary ===
Games played	36 (33 Danish Superliga, 3 Danish Cup)
Games won	15 (13 Danish Superliga, 2 Danish Cup)
Games drawn	9 (8 Danish Superliga, 1 Danish Cup)
Games lost	12 (12 Danish Superliga)
Goals scored	57 (51 Danish Superliga, 6 Danish Cup)
Goals conceded	47 (46 Danish Superliga, 1 Danish Cup)
Goal difference	+10 (+5 Danish Superliga, +5 Danish Cup)
Clean sheets	10 (8 Danish Superliga, 2 Danish Cup)
Yellow cards	43 (40 Danish Superliga, 3 Danish Cup)
Red cards	2 (2 Danish Superliga)
Best result(s)	W 0 – 4 (A) v OB – Danish Superliga – 26 August 2012, W 0 – 4 (A) v SønderjyskE – Danish Superliga – 31 August 2012 & W 4 – 0 (H) v Randers FC – Danish Superliga – 16 September 2012
Worst result(s)	L 4 – 0 (A) v FC København – Danish Superliga – 11 November 2012
Most appearances	Nicklas Helenius (36 appearances)
Top scorer(s)	Nicklas Helenius (18 goals)
Top assister(s)	Nicklas Helenius & Kasper Kusk (7 assists)
Worst discipline	Rasmus Würtz (10 (yellow card) , 1 (red card) )

== Awards ==
=== Player ===
No.	Player	Award	Month	Source
11	(Denmark) Nicklas Helenius	AaB Player of the Season 2012–13	September 2013	

=== Team ===
Award	Month	Source
Fairplay	May 2013	
