= 2014 Danish Cup final =

- Event: 2013–14 Danish Cup
AaB	FC Copenhagen
4	2
- Date: 15 May 2014
- Venue: Parken, Copenhagen
- Referee: Jakob Kehlet
- Attendance: 27,380

The 2014 Danish Cup final was a football match that decided the winner of the 2013–14 Danish Cup. It was played on 15 May 2013 at 20:00 CEST.

== Route to the final ==
AaB				FC Copenhagen
Opponent	Result	Legs	Round	Opponent	Result	Legs
Silkeborg IF	2–0	2–0 away	Second round
HB Køge	2–1	2–1 away	Third round	Hvidovre IF	4–2	4–2 away
FC Sydvest 05 Tønder	3–1	3–1 away	Fourth round	OB	4-3	4–3 home
AGF	4–1	4–1 away	Quarter-finals	Lyngby	2–1	2–1 away
AC Horsens	5–2	3–1 away; 2–1 home	Semi-finals	FC Nordsjælland	2–1	1–0 home; 1–1 away (a.e.t.)

== Match ==
15 May 2014
20:00 CEST

AaB	4–2	FC Copenhagen
Thelander 41', 44'; Ahlmann 72'; Frederiksen 74'	Report	Cornelius 18'; Gíslason 89'

Parken, Copenhagen
Attendance: 27,380
Referee: Jakob Kehlet

AaB (4–4–2):
GK	1	(Denmark) Nicolai Larsen
RB	27	(Denmark) Patrick Kristensen
CB	32	(Denmark) Kasper Pedersen
CB	26	(Denmark) Rasmus Thelander
LB	3	(Denmark) Jakob Ahlmann Nielsen		(yellow card) 7'
RM	17	(Denmark) Kasper Kusk
CM	8	(Denmark) Rasmus Würtz		(yellow card) 14'
CM	21	(Denmark) Kasper Risgård		(substituted off) 88'
LM	23	(Denmark) Nicolaj Thomsen
CF	18	(Denmark) Anders K. Jacobsen		(substituted off) 79'
CF	23	(Lithuania) Lukas Spalvis		(substituted off) 70'
Substitutions:
GK	22	(Denmark) Carsten Christensen
DF	31	(Denmark) Jakob Blåbjerg
FW	19	(Denmark) Søren Frederiksen		(substituted on) 70'
MF	14	(Denmark) Mathias Wichmann
FW	10	(Denmark) Jeppe Curth
MF	9	(Denmark) Thomas Augustinussen		(substituted on) 79'
MF	7	(Denmark) Anders Due	(substituted on) 88'
Manager:
(Denmark) Kent Nielsen

Copenhagen (4–4–2):
GK	21	(Sweden) Johan Wiland
RB	2	(Denmark) Lars Jacobsen
CB	4	(Denmark) Kris Stadsgaard	(yellow card) 7'
CB	15	(Austria) Georg Margreitter	(substituted off) 38'
LB	3	(Sweden) Pierre Bengtsson
RM	30	(Costa Rica) Christian Bolaños
CM	6	(Brazil) Claudemir	(substituted off) 68'
CM	16	(Denmark) Thomas Kristensen
LM	22	(Norway) Daniel Braaten	(yellow card) 29'
CF	11	(Denmark) Andreas Cornelius
CF	9	(Belgium) Igor Vetokele	(substituted off) 68'
Substitutions:
GK	1	(Denmark) Kim Christensen
FW/MF	33	(Denmark) Yones Felfel
FW/MF	32	(Denmark) Danny Amankwaa
DF	25	(Denmark) Christoffer Remmer
MF	7	(Iceland) Rurik Gislason	(substituted on) 68'
MF/FW	18	(Denmark) Nicolai Jørgensen	(substituted on) 68'
MF	8	(Denmark) Thomas Delaney	(substituted on) 38'
Manager:
(Norway) Ståle Solbakken
