= List of AaB Fodbold seasons =

This is a list of all seasons played by AaB in Danish and European football, from their first participation in the Danish Football Association league structure in the 1928–29 season to their most recently completed season (2025–26). It details their record in every major competition entered, as well as the top league goalscorers for each season. Top scorers in bold were also the top scorers in AaB's division that season.

AaB have won several major domestic honours in Denmark and have participated in multiple European competitions. In total, the club have won four domestic league championships (1994–95, 1998–99, 2007–08, 2013–14) and three domestic cups (1965–66, 1969–70, 2013–14). Internationally, AaB have competed in both the UEFA Champions League and the UEFA Cup/UEFA Europa League, with notable performances including reaching the group stage of the UEFA Champions League in 1995-96 and 2008-09, the Round of 16 in the UEFA Cup in 2008-09, and the Round of 32 in the UEFA Europa League in 2014-15.

As of the end of the 2025–26 season, AaB have spent 72 seasons in the top division of Danish football.

== Key ==
- CT – Denmark's Championship Tournament
- CS – The Championship Series
- WT – The War Tournaments
- Div 1 – Danish 1st Division
- Div 2 – Danish 2nd Division
- Div 3 – Danish 3rd Division
- SL – Danish Superliga
- Cup – Danish Cup
- LC – Danish League Cup
- SC – Danish Super Cup
- UCL – European Cup / UEFA Champions League
- UEL – Inter-Cities Fairs Cup / UEFA Cup / UEFA Europa League
- UEC – UEFA Conference League
- CWC – European Cup Winners' Cup / UEFA Cup Winners' Cup
- UIC – International Football Cup / Intertoto Cup / UEFA Intertoto Cup
- RL – Royal League
- Pld – Matches played
- W – Matches won
- D – Matches drawn
- L – Matches lost
- GF – Goals for
- GA – Goals against
- Pts – Points
- Pos – Final position
- 1Q – First qualifying round
- 2Q – Second qualifying round
- 3Q – Third qualifying round
- PO – Play-off round
- GS – Group Stage
- R32 – Round of 32
- R16 – Round of 16
- R1 – Round 1
- R2 – Round 2
- R3 – Round 3
- R4 – Round 4
- R5 – Round 5
- QF – Quarter-finals
- SF – Semi-finals
- RU – Runners-up
- W – Winners

Winners	Runners-up	Third place	Promoted ↑	Relegated ↓	Top scorer(s) in AaB's division

== Seasons ==
Results of league and cup competitions by season
Season	League									Domestic competitions			International competitions						AaB's season's best	Top league goalscorer(s)	
Season	Division	Pld	W	D	L	GF	GA	Pts	Pos	Cup	LC	SC	UCL	UEL	UEC	CWC	UIC	RL	AaB's season's best	Player(s)	Goals
1928-29	CT	4	2	0	2	10	14	4	GS												
1929–30	CS	9	2	2	5	19	34	6	7th												
1930-31	CS	9	3	0	6	26	46	6	7th												
1931-32	CS	9	3	2	4	28	34	8	6th												
1932-33	CS	9	4	2	3	28	15	10	5th											Søren Simon Andersen	**11**
1933-34	CS	9	3	0	6	24	39	6	8th												
1934-35	CS	9	2	1	6	17	21	5	9th												
1935-36	CS	9	4	2	3	25	16	10	3rd												
1936-37	CS	18	7	2	9	28	45	16	6th												
1937-38	CS	18	5	5	8	44	41	15	7th												
1938-39	CS	18	7	4	7	31	28	18	4th												
1939-40	CS	18	7	3	8	30	32	17	7th												
1940-41	WT	12	6	4	2	21	12	16	QF											Kaj Verner Hansen	9
1941-42	WT	18	10	4	4	36	22	24	QF												
1942-43	WT	18	9	1	8	28	31	19	GS												
1943-44	WT	18	7	3	8	35	36	17	GS												
1944-45	WT	6	1	2	3	8	14	4	GS											Kaj Verner Hansen	10
1945–46	Div 1	18	6	2	10	19	38	14	9th												
1946-47	Div 1 ↓	18	4	1	13	22	51	9	10th											Orla Meyer	10
1947-48	Div 2	18	9	3	6	36	32	21	3rd											Orla Meyer Ove Rønn	8
1948-49	Div 2	18	7	5	6	30	19	19	4th												
1949-50	Div 2	18	7	3	8	29	35	17	6th											Ove Rønn	11
1950-51	Div 2	18	9	4	5	37	26	22	3rd											Ove Rønn	11
1951-52	Div 2	18	3	5	10	29	42	11	9th												
1952-53	Div 2	18	6	1	11	28	37	13	8th												
1953-54	Div 2	18	7	4	7	41	42	18	5th											Ingemann Clausen	**16**
1954-55	Div 2 ↓	18	3	5	10	23	45	11	10th	R4											
1955-56	Div 3	22	9	5	8	47	45	23	5th	R4											
1956-57	Div 3 ↑	33	18	5	10	84	50	41	5th	R3											
1958	Div 2	22	6	6	10	33	46	18	8th	R3											
1959	Div 2	22	8	4	10	46	53	20	7th	R2											
1960	Div 2	22	7	7	8	33	38	21	6th	R2											
1961	Div 2	22	12	6	4	53	30	30	3rd	R2											
1962	Div 2 ↑	22	12	5	5	43	40	29	**1st**	R4										Kjeld Thorst	17
1963	Div 1 ↓	22	7	4	11	30	46	18	11th	R3											
1964	Div 2 ↑	22	14	3	5	56	32	31	2nd	R3										Kjeld Thorst	19
1965	Div 1	22	7	7	8	32	27	21	7th	R2										Jens Flou	10
1966	Div 1	22	9	2	11	32	32	20	9th	**W**						R1					
1967	Div 1	22	7	9	6	38	36	23	5th	RU										Kurt Dalgaard Berthelsen	13
1968	Div 1	22	7	7	8	37	35	21	7th	QF										Finn Døssing	7
1969	Div 1	22	12	5	5	52	26	29	3rd	SF										Finn Jes Jønson	10
1970	Div 1	22	9	3	10	34	29	21	8th	**W**						R1	GS				
1971	Div 1 ↓	22	7	4	11	37	47	18	11th	R3											
1972	Div 2 ↑	22	12	4	6	60	40	28	2nd	R3	SF									Kurt Dalgaard Berthelsen	**21**
1973	Div 1	22	6	9	7	32	30	21	6th	R3	GS									John Holm Jensen Kurt Dalgaard Berthelsen	7
1974	Div 1	22	6	7	9	35	41	19	10th	SF										Ole Nielsen	9
1975	Div 1	30	14	5	11	63	49	33	7th	SF											
1976	Div 1	30	15	7	8	55	41	37	4th	R4										Mogens Jespersen	**22**
1977	Div 1 ↓	30	6	10	14	33	43	22	14th	SF							GS				
1978	Div 2 ↑	30	17	8	5	64	36	42	**1st**	SF										Finn Trikker Nielsen	16
1979	Div 1	30	10	6	14	42	45	26	12th	R2										Finn Trikker Nielsen	16
1980	Div 1 ↓	30	2	2	26	27	85	6	16th	R2	GS										
1981	Div 2 ↓	30	8	5	17	26	55	21	14th	R3	GS										
1982	Div 3	30	11	6	13	45	40	28	10th	R3	GS									Lars Emil Thomsen	13
1983	Div 3	30	12	6	12	45	43	30	10th	R1	GS										
1984	Div 3 ↑	30	21	6	3	77	37	48	**1st**	R4	GS										
1985	Div 2	30	14	8	8	60	48	36	5th	SF										Ole Bach Jensen	12
1986	Div 2 ↑	30	13	12	5	56	36	38	2nd	R2										Søren Dissing	9
1987	Div 1	26	7	6	13	27	38	20	10th	RU						R1				Ib Simonsen	6
1988	Div 1	26	8	6	12	33	50	22	11th	R4										Anders Sundstrup	9
1989	Div 1	26	5	9	12	30	39	19	11th	QF										Bo Elvar Jørgensen	6
1990	Div 1	26	8	10	8	32	34	26	10th	R4										Peter Møller	9
1991	SL	18	6	5	7	29	33	17	6th	RU									Calle Facius	Peter Møller	9
1991-92	SL	32	10	12	10	45	44	32	5th	QF										Peter Møller	**17**
1992-93	SL	32	12	12	8	48	40	46	4th	RU							**W**			Peter Møller	**20**
1993-94	SL	32	8	15	9	46	44	31	5th	QF				R1			GS			Erik Bo Andersen	12
1994-95	SL	32	19	6	7	74	38	44	**1st**	SF							GS		Jes Høgh	Erik Bo Andersen	**24**
1995-96	SL	33	15	6	12	57	38	51	5th	QF	QF	RU	GS						Ib Simonsen	Erik Bo Andersen	13
1996-97	SL	33	12	11	10	46	40	47	5th	QF							GS		Jens Jessen	Søren Andersen	14
1997-98	SL	33	12	8	13	54	48	44	7th	QF							GS		Ståle Solbakken	Steffen Højer	11
1998-99	SL	33	17	13	3	65	37	64	**1st**	RU									Ståle Solbakken	Søren Frederiksen	17
1999-00	SL	33	12	13	8	57	40	49	5th	RU		RU	3Q	R1					Anders Andersson	Søren Frederiksen	14
2000-01	SL	33	13	10	10	51	49	49	5th	R5							R3		Michael Silberbauer	Søren Frederiksen	10
2001-02	SL	33	16	6	11	52	45	54	4th	QF									Michael Silberbauer	Indrek Zelinski	13
2002-03	SL	33	14	4	15	42	45	46	6th	SF									Rasmus Würtz	Andres Oper	11
2003-04	SL	33	16	9	8	55	41	57	5th	RU									Jimmy Nielsen	Christian Lundberg	16
2004-05	SL	33	15	8	10	59	45	53	4th	R5		RU		R1					Martin Ericsson	Simon Bræmer	11
2005-06	SL	33	11	12	10	48	44	45	5th	SF								GS	Thomas Augustinussen	Simon Bræmer	8
2006-07	SL	33	18	7	8	55	35	61	3rd	R2									Rade Prica	Rade Prica	**19**
2007-08	SL	33	22	5	6	60	38	71	**1st**	R4				GS			**W**		Thomas Augustinussen	Jeppe Curth	**17**
2008-09	SL	33	9	12	12	40	49	39	7th	RU			GS	R16					Allan Kuhn	Cacá	8
2009-10	SL	33	13	9	11	36	30	48	5th	R4				Q2					Kjetil Wæhler	Andreas Johansson	8
2010-11	SL	33	8	11	14	38	48	35	10th	QF									Rasmus Würtz	Morten Rasmussen	6
2011-12	SL	33	12	8	13	42	48	44	7th	R2									Nicklas Helenius	Nicklas Helenius	14
2012-13	SL	33	13	8	12	51	46	47	5th	R4									Nicklas Helenius	Nicklas Helenius	16
2013-14	SL	33	18	8	7	60	38	62	**1st**	**W**				Q2					Rasmus Würtz	Kasper Kusk	12
2014-15	SL	33	13	9	11	39	31	48	5th	QF			PO	R32					Rasmus Würtz	Anders K. Jacobsen	10
2015-16	SL	33	15	5	13	56	44	50	5th	SF									Nicolaj Thomsen	Lukas Spalvis	**18**
2016-17	SL	34	10	8	16	31	49	38	10th	QF									Joakim Mæhle	Jakub Sylvestr	5
2017-18	SL	36	10	15	11	38	44	45	5th	QF									Jacob Rinne	Jannik Pohl	8
2018-19	SL	34	10	12	12	44	44	42	9th	SF									Lucas Andersen	Lucas Andersen	10
2019-20	SL	36	16	6	14	54	44	54	5th	RU									Patrick Kristensen	Lucas Andersen Tom van Weert	10
2020-21	SL	32	12	10	10	44	41	46	7th	R4									Jacob Rinne	Iver Fossum	9
2021-22	SL	32	13	6	13	47	45	45	5th	R4									Louka Prip	Louka Prip	14
2022-23	SL ↓	32	6	9	17	34	45	27	12th	RU									Allan Sousa	Allan Sousa	8
2023-24	Div 1 ↑	32	19	8	5	66	38	65	2nd	R3									Melker Widell	Mathias Jørgensen	11
2024-25	SL ↓	32	5	9	18	34	67	24	12th	QF									Melker Widell	Mathias Jørgensen	10
2025-26	Div 1	32	12	10	10	50	47	46	7th	R3									Nicklas Helenius	Nicklas Helenius	10
2026-27	Div 1	32																			

As of the 2026-27 season

- **72** seasons in the Highest Danish League
- **22** seasons in the Second Highest Danish League
- **5** seasons in the Third Highest Danish League
