= Jakob Ahlmann =

Danish footballer (born 1991)

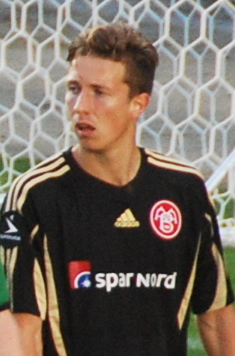
- Ahlmann with AaB in 2011

Personal information
- Full name: Jakob Ahlmann Nielsen
- Date of birth: 18 January 1991 (age 35)
- Place of birth: Brønderslev, Denmark
- Height: 1.79 m (5 ft 10 in)
- Position: Left-back

Team information
- Current team: AaB (scout)

Youth career
- 1995–2004: Brønderslev IF
- 2004–2006: AaB
- 2006–2009: Midtjylland

Senior career*
Years	Team	Apps	(Gls)
2009–2024	AaB	299	(8)

International career
2008	Denmark U17	4	(0)
2008–2009	Denmark U18	8	(0)
2009–2010	Denmark U19	6	(0)
2012	Denmark U21	1	(0)
2014–2021	Denmark	3	(0)

Managerial career
- 2024–: AaB (scout)
- * Club domestic league appearances and goals

Jakob Ahlmann Nielsen (born 18 January 1991) is a Danish retired professional footballer who played as a left-back and current scout at AaB. He has played three matches for the Denmark national football team.

== Club career ==
=== Early career ===
Ahlmann started playing football in the youth of Brønderslev IF. As a 13-year-old, he was discovered by AaB and joined the club's youth department. In 2006, two years after his transfer to AaB, however, he moved to FC Midtjylland, to play for their youth academy. Regarding his move to Midtjylland, Ahlmann stated in an interview with Nordjyske in May 2008 that: "Now this is my job. But I don't see it as a real job, despite being paid for it. That's what I like. But it's become a lot more serious, and it's not always fun. It requires a lot of practice."

=== AaB ===
In August 2009, AaB signed Ahlmann from Midtjylland on a professional contract. He made his Superliga debut for AaB under head coach Magnus Pehrsson when he came on as a substitute on 16 May 2010, in the last match of the season, with 29 minutes left to play in a match against HB Køge. His debut match ended in a 0–0 draw, and was his only match in the 2009–10 Superliga. He suffered a groin injury which kept him out for a substantial period of time following his debut. He did not make any Superliga appearances during the 2010–11 season as a result.

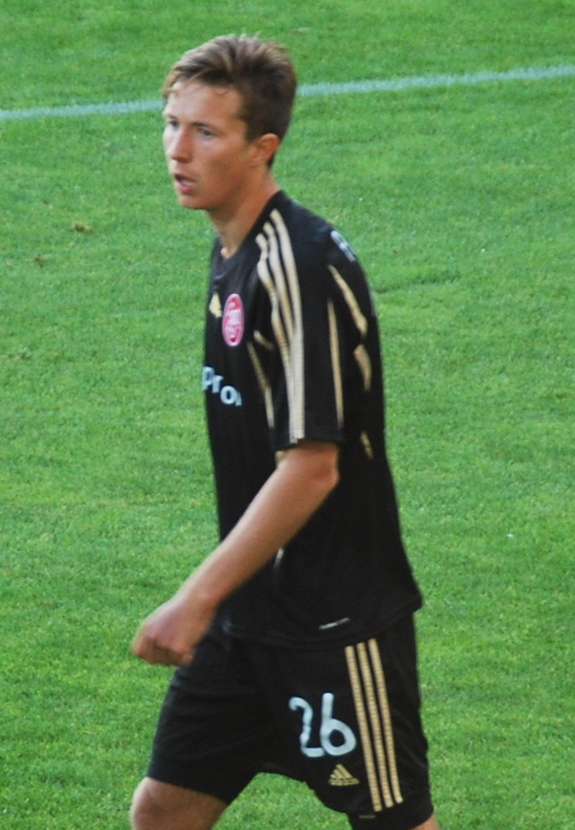
Ahlmann against Viborg in 2011

At the beginning of the 2011–12 season, Ahlmann was again included in the first team, where Patrick Kristensen had played in the same position. Lucho had also been brought to the club in the summer transfer window, who could also play left back. Ahlmann made 17 appearances that season, of which 14 matches were full games. At the end of the 2011–12 season, Jakob and his brother Viktor Ahlmann both signed contract extension with AaB. Jakob Ahlmann signed a four-year extension until 30 June 2016. The following season, Ahlmann made 29 appearances for AaB.

Ahlmann made his definitive breakthrough for AaB in the 2013–14 season. After 29 matchdays, Ahlmann had appeared in 24 matches, of which 22 were in 90 minutes. In his 71st match for AaB, Ahlmann scored his first professional goal, the 0–2 opener away against Viborg FF, in a match which ended in a 0–2 away win. Ahlmann stated in connection with his first goal that "it was incredibly nice to see it go in". That season, AaB won its fourth Danish championship. Ahlmann played all 90 minutes in the decisive match on 11 May 2014 for the championship. The match between FC Vestsjælland and AaB ended in a 0–0 draw at Slagelse Stadion, while FC Copenhagen beat FC Midtjylland 2–3 away, which sent the championship to Aalborg in the penultimate matchday. He also played the entire match of the 2013–14 Danish Cup final, which ended in a 4–2 win over FC Copenhagen in Parken Stadium on 15 May 2014. Ahlmanns scored the third goal for AaB in the match. "It's crazy. It's hard to put into words," Ahlmann told Ekstra Bladet after the match.

In the autumn of 2014, Ahlmann suffered a cruciate ligament injury, which sidelined him for almost a year. Ahlmann made his comeback in a pre-season friendly in the summer of 2015. On 31 July 2015, he extended his contract to June 2017. In May 2018, Ahlmann extended his contract to 2021.

As his contract was set to expire in the summer of 2021, Ahlmann signed another contract extension on 14 May 2021, keeping him part of AaB until 2024. At that point, he had made 244 official appearances for the club, in which he recorded six goals and 20 assists.

In May 2024, AaB announced that Ahlmann would be retiring from football at the end of his contract, continuing on at the club as a scout.

== International career ==
Ahlmann has played on various Danish youth national teams. As an under-18 national team player, Ahlmann gained eight caps, which was the national youth team he performed for the most times in his career. He has appeared once for the U21 team when they played against Turkey in a friendly match.

The day after AaB won the Superliga, on 12 May 2014, Ahlmann was called up for the Denmark senior team for the first time by national coach Morten Olsen for the matches against Hungary and Sweden, along with fellow AaB players Kasper Kusk, Rasmus Würtz and Nicolaj Thomsen. The debut for the national team came in the match against Hungary on 22 May 2014, where he played from the start. His debut match ended 2–2, on Danish goals scored by Christian Eriksen and Lasse Schöne.

After failing to make an appearance for the national team for six years, Ahlmann returned in action in November 2020, where he came on as a late substitute in a friendly against Sweden.

== Personal life ==
Ahlmann was born in Brønderslev, approximately 38 kilometers north of Aalborg. He has a younger brother, Viktor Ahlmann, who has also played for AaB. Furthermore, he is the cousin of Michael Sten Jensen, who also had a short stint with AaB. After Ahlmann moved from Midtjylland to AaB, they played together for a period until Jensen moved to Ventura County Fusion. Jensen later became a sports journalist for DR.

== Honours ==
AaB

- Danish Superliga: 2013–14
- Danish Cup: 2013–14
