= Nicolai Larsen =

Danish footballer (born 1991)

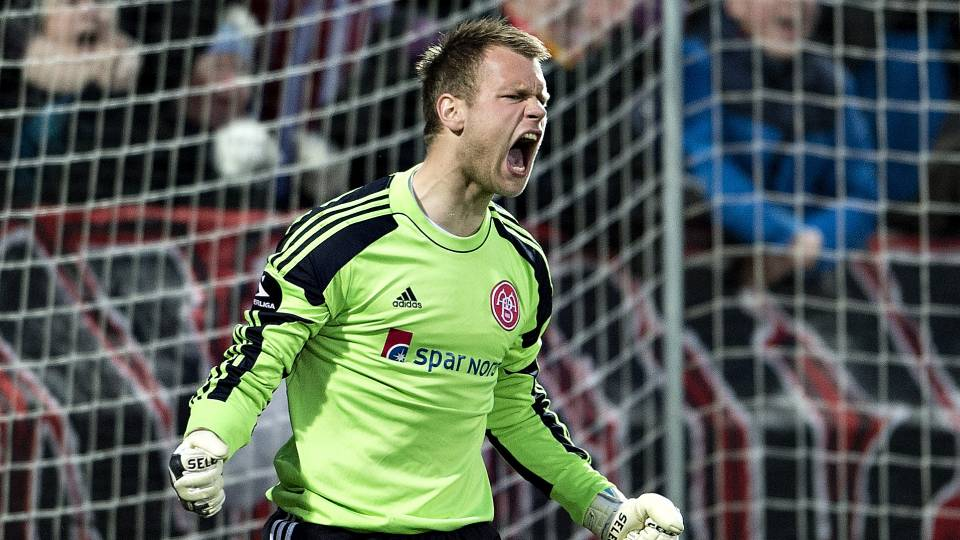
- Larsen with AaB in 2016

Personal information
- Full name: Nicolai Oppen Larsen
- Date of birth: 9 March 1991 (age 35)
- Place of birth: Herlev, Denmark
- Height: 1.90 m (6 ft 3 in)
- Position: Goalkeeper

Team information
- Current team: Vejle

Youth career
- Herlev
- 2005–2010: Lyngby

Senior career*
Years	Team	Apps	(Gls)
2010–2017	AaB	194	(0)
2017–2020	Nordsjælland	57	(0)
2020–2021	Guingamp	6	(0)
2021–2026	Silkeborg	158	(0)
2026–	Vejle	0	(0)

International career
2007	Denmark U16	1	(0)
2007–2008	Denmark U17	11	(0)
2008–2009	Denmark U18	7	(0)
2009–2010	Denmark U19	13	(0)
2010	Denmark U20	1	(0)
2011	Denmark U21	4	(0)
- * Club domestic league appearances and goals as of 08:42, 19 May 2026 (UTC)

Nicolai Oppen Larsen (born 9 March 1991) is a Danish professional footballer who plays as a goalkeeper for Danish 1st Division club Vejle.

Beginning his career in Lyngby, Larsen moved to AaB in 2010. There, he established himself as a starter and was part of a historical season where AaB won the Danish Double, as they secured the Danish Superliga and the Danish Cup in the 2013–14 season. He also experienced personal success at the club, winning the Danish Goalkeeper of the Year award for 2014. After seven years at AaB, Larsen moved to Nordsjælland in 2017. He would initially struggle to make the team, but eventually became the starting goalkeeper. In 2020, at age 29, he earned a move to French club Guingamp, but returned to Denmark after one season, signing with Silkeborg.

Larsen is a Danish youth international, gaining 37 caps for different national youth teams between under-16 and under-21 level. In 2014, he received a call-up for the Denmark national team, but has not made any appearances for the senior side.

== Club career ==
=== Lyngby ===
Larsen played for Lyngby Boldklub from 2005, whom he moved to from the youth academy of Herlev IF. He never made a senior appearance for Lyngby, but gained several caps for Denmark national youth teams during his time at the club. While at Lyngby, Larsen went on trials abroad, among others with English club Everton. He moved away from Lyngby Boldklub in 2010.

=== AaB ===
==== 2010–2012 ====
On 15 June 2010, ahead of the 2010–11 season, AaB signed Larsen on a two-year contract. Then director of sports in AaB, Lynge Jakobsen stated in the club's press release that "Nicolai is young, but has the potential to become a Superliga goalkeeper, and with us he will, among other things, through daily practice with Karim Zaza and our goalkeeping coach Poul Buus have the opportunity to continue his development". Upon his arrival at AaB, he became the backup to starting goalkeeper, Karim Zaza, who played in AaB for four years, between 2007 and 2011.

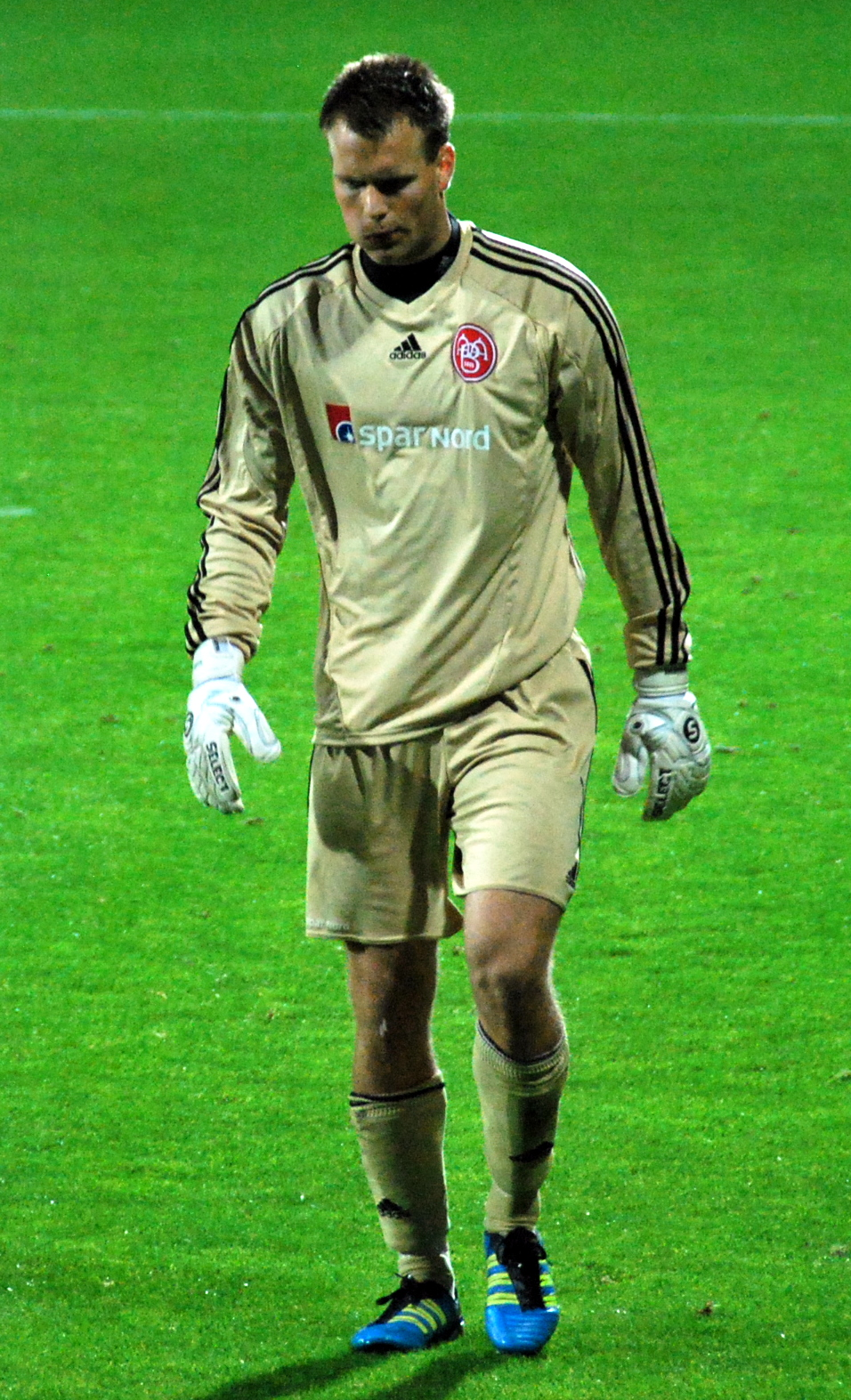
Larsen against Viborg FF. Viborg won 8–7 after penalties

Larsen made his debut for AaB as a 20-year-old when he started in an away match against Brøndby IF on 17 July 2011. His first senior appearance ended in a 2–2 draw, where he played the full 90 minutes. Larsen was considered the starting goalkeeper in the 2011–12 season, his second at AaB, after Zaza's contract with the club was not extended, despite the club being saved from relegation on the last day of play in the regular season. Addressing Larsen's debut, Kent Nielsen, AaB's head coach, stated that "we [AaB] are therefore full of confidence and feel safe starting him, just as we are sure that he can also tackle the adversity that will come, sooner or later." Carsten Christensen was brought in as a backup for Larsen in the summer of 2011, leading up to his debut season. In his debut season, Larsen made 32 appearances out of 33 possible in the Superliga. He received two warnings during the season. At the age of 20, Larsen signed a four-year contract extension with AaB keeping him a part of the club from Aalborg until 2015. He signed the contract at a point, where he had made 17 official first-team appearances for AaB.

==== 2012–2014 ====
The following season also saw him as the starting goalkeeper for AaB. He played all 33 matches from start, and also played a full 90 minutes in them all. At the end of the season, Larsen had played 2970 minutes in total in the 2012–13 season, as AaB finished in 5th place.

In the 2013–14 Danish Superliga season, his third season as the club's starting goalkeeper, he made 32 out of 33 possible appearances in the league, playing full time in all 32 matches. In these 32 matches, Larsen also incurred one single warning in a match against Randers FC on 11 November 2013, which resulted in him receiving three suspension points. In December 2013, he was voted second in Danish Goalkeeper of the Year awards by his fellow Superliga and 1st Division (second-tier) goalkeepers for 2013. Larsen signed a four-year contract extension on 2 May 2014, keeping him at the club until 30 June 2018. AaB would go on to win their fourth Danish championship in the 2013–14 season. The title was secured on 11 May 2014, where AaB drew 0–0 away against FC Vestsjælland, as FC Midtjylland lost 3–2 to Copenhagen, which effectively made the club from Aalborg Danish champions. AaB also won the Danish Cup this year, defeating Copenhagen in the final on 15 May 2014 to secure the Danish Double.

To kick off the new season, Larsen appeared in two UEFA Europa League qualifiers on 18 and 26 July 2014 against Georgian club Dila Gori, where AaB lost 3–0 on aggregate.

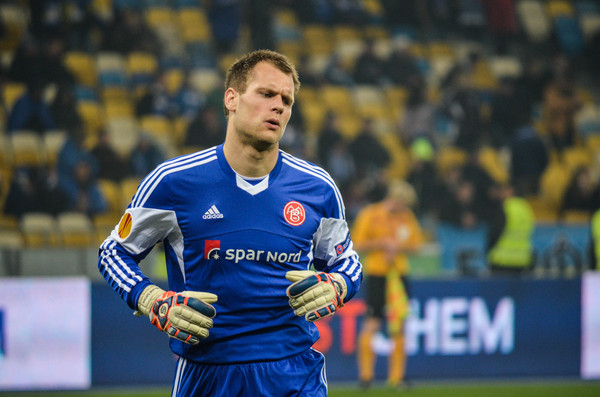
Larsen playing for AaB in 2014.

On 26 December 2014, it was announced that Larsen had won the Danish Goalkeeper of the Year award of 2014. It had originally been planned that the award should have been presented to Larsen prior to the match against Brøndby IF on 22 February 2015 by Troels Bager Thøgersen, editor-in-chief of Tipsbladet, but Larsen had to postpone in the last minute due to illness, and therefore the award was presented to him at the match against Randers FC on 8 March 2015. Larsen received 58 out of 72 possible votes from his goalkeeper colleagues, while second-place in the competition, Karl-Johan Johnsson from Randers FC, received 34 votes. On winning the award, Larsen stated that "[t]his is one of the big ones. It is a personal title, and it makes it is awesome that my competitors and colleagues are the ones who vote [...]" and he continued "[t]his is one of those awards I will look back on and be proud of[...]".

=== Nordsjælland ===
On 31 August 2017, the last day of the summer transfer window, Larsen moved to Superliga club FC Nordsjælland. He was brought in to supplement starting goalkeeper Rúnar Alex Rúnarsson. He made his official debut for the club in the 2017–18 Danish Cup 3rd round matchup against Vejgaard BK, where Larsen kept a clean sheet, as Nordsjælland won 4–0 on Soffy Road. He would, however, not make his Superliga debut for Nordsjælland in his first season at the club, as Rúnarsson played all 36 matches.

Runarsson was sold to French club Dijon FCO in June 2018, and in early July 2018, Nordsjælland brought in Nigel Bertrams from Dutch side NAC Breda. Thus, Larsen had to compete with Bertrams and Peter Vindahl Jensen for a starting job. However, Larsen initially took over the position as first goalkeeper, who among other made his European debut for the club in the UEFA Europa League qualification against Northern Irish club Cliftonville on 12 July 2018 and started in the following five matches in the tournament, until the club was knocked out of the tournament to Serbian side FK Partizan over two legs. In particular Larsen was praised for his performances in the first leg of the second round qualifier against Swedish club AIK, where he, among other things, saved a penalty kick. He made his debut in the Superliga for Nordsjælland on 15 July 2018 in a match against Esbjerg fB, which ended 1–1.

=== Guingamp ===
On 25 June 2020, after three years at Nordsjælland, Larsen was signed by French club En Avant Guingamp on a two-year contract. He officially joined the club on 12 July. Larsen made his debut for the club on 22 August in a 1–0 home loss to Chamois Niortais. He was benched after Guingamp experienced a poor start to the season. In late October, he tested positive for SARS-CoV-2 together with teammate Matthias Phaeton.

=== Silkeborg ===
On 23 June 2021, it was announced that Larsen had signed a two-year contract with newly promoted Danish Superliga club Silkeborg. He made his debut on 19 July – the first matchday of the 2021–22 Danish Superliga – keeping a clean sheet in a 0–0 home draw against SønderjyskE. He remained the starting goalkeeper for Silkeborg through the fall and recorded strong performances.

On 9 May 2024, Larsen delivered a crucial save as Silkeborg won its second ever Danish Cup.

=== Vejle ===
On 19 May 2026, Larsen joined Danish 1st Division club Vejle on a two-year contract.

== International career ==
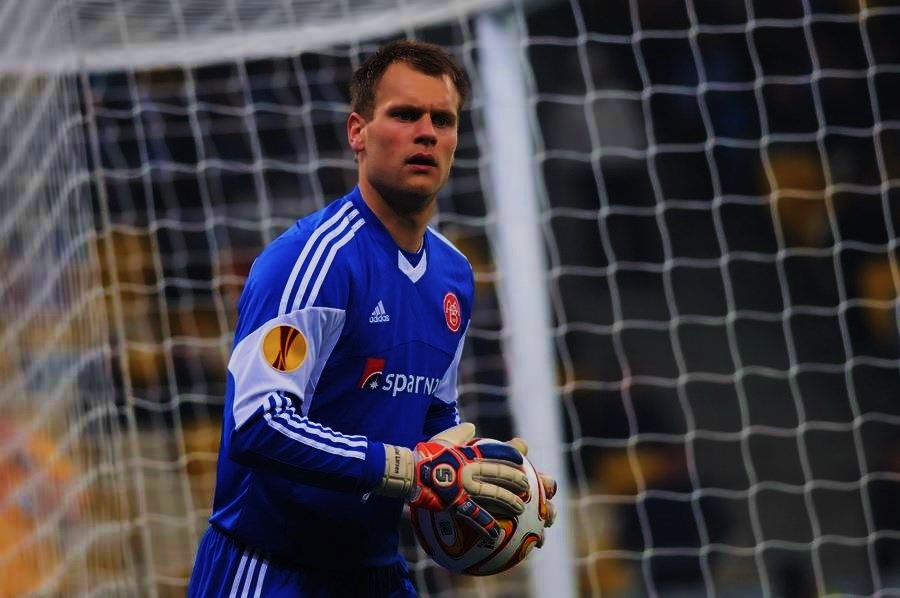
Nicolai Larsen in the UEFA Europa League

Larsen has appeared for all Denmark national youth teams throughout his career. He gained most caps for the Denmark under-19 team. Larsen made his debut when he participated in a national youth match against Portugal under-16 on 10 April 2007 in Castelo Branco, Portugal with Glen Riddersholm as coach. His debut for the under-16 team ended in a 2–2 draw. He has gained 37 caps for various national youth teams between under-16 and under-21 level, but has not yet won an appearance for the Denmark national football team.

Larsen received his first call-up for the Denmark national team on 26 August 2014, where he and his teammate Rasmus Würtz were selected to play the friendly match against Turkey on 3 September 2014, played at TREFOR Park in Odense, and against Armenia in the UEFA Euro 2016 qualifiers on 7 September 2014. In the match against Turkey, Larsen did not make an appearance as Denmark lost 2–1 on goals by Ozan Tufan and Olcay Şahan. He also did not appear in the qualifying match against Armenia, where Kasper Schmeichel was preferred as a starter the match.

== Personal life ==
Both his father and his grandfather have made appearances and scored goals for the Denmark national team. His father and grandfather are named Carsten Larsen and Benno Larsen, respectively. Benno Larsen was born on 30 September 1949. He started his professional career in B 1903 in 1969, where he played until 1971. Benno Larsen won 16 national team caps and played in his active career in clubs such as FC St. Pauli, GAIS and FC Augsburg. He participated in the famous away game in Gothenburg, where Denmark won 2–1 in 1976; a place where Denmark had not won a match since 1937. In addition to his 16 caps, he also played 21 matches for the Denmark under-21 team. Benno Larsen became coach of Helsingør IF seniors in 2012.

Carsten Larsen was born on 5 September 1968. He gained three caps for Denmark under-17. He made his international debut on 29 July 1986 in a match against Iceland in Akureyri, Iceland in an inter-Nordic tournament. Carsten Larsen has been described as a responsive goalkeeper with good hands, but stopped prematurely in 1999 after a series of serious cruciate ligament injuries. In 1986, Carsten Larsen received the KB Fodbold Granen, which is awarded each year by Kjøbenhavns Boldklub (KB)'s board to the club's U17 or U19 player.

== Career statistics ==
As of match played 17 May 2026

Appearances and goals by club, season and competition
Club	Season	League			National cup (Note: Includes Danish Cup, Coupe de France)		Europe		Other		Total	
Club	Season	Division	Apps	Goals	Apps	Goals	Apps	Goals	Apps	Goals	Apps	Goals
AaB	2010–11	Danish Superliga	0	0	0	0	—		—		0	0
AaB	2011–12	Danish Superliga	32	0	1	0	—		—		33	0
AaB	2012–13	Danish Superliga	33	0	2	0	—		—		35	0
AaB	2013–14	Danish Superliga	32	0	7	0	2 (Note: Appearances in UEFA Europa League)	0	—		41	0
AaB	2014–15	Danish Superliga	32	0	3	0	11 (Note: Four appearances in UEFA Champions League, seven appearances in UEFA Europa League)	0	—		46	0
AaB	2015–16	Danish Superliga	33	0	6	0	—		—		39	0
AaB	2016–17	Danish Superliga	32	0	0	0	—		2 (Note: Appearance(s) in Danish Superliga European play-off match)	0	34	0
AaB	Total		194	0	19	0	13	0	2	0	228	0
Nordsjælland	2017–18	Danish Superliga	0	0	2	0	—		—		2	0
Nordsjælland	2018–19	Danish Superliga	30	0	0	0	6	0	—		36	0
Nordsjælland	2019–20	Danish Superliga	27	0	1	0	—		—		28	0
Nordsjælland	Total		57	0	3	0	6	0	—		66	0
Guingamp	2020–21	Ligue 2	6	0	1	0	—		—		7	0
Silkeborg	2021–22	Danish Superliga	32	0	2	0	—		—		34	0
Silkeborg	2022–23	Danish Superliga	32	0	6	0	8 (Note: Two appearances in UEFA Europa League, six appearances in UEFA Europa Conference League)	0	—		46	0
Silkeborg	2023–24	Danish Superliga	32	0	6	0	—		—		38	0
Silkeborg	2024–25	Danish Superliga	31	0	7	0	4 (Note: Two appearances in UEFA Europa League, two appearances in UEFA Conference League)	0	1	0	43	0
Silkeborg	2025–26	Danish Superliga	31	0	2	0	4 (Note: Appearances in UEFA Conference League)	0	—		37	0
Silkeborg	Total		158	0	23	0	16	0	1	0	198	0
Vejle	2026–27	Danish 1st Division	0	0	0	0	—		—		0	0
Career total			415	0	46	0	35	0	3	0	499	0

== Honours ==
AaB

- Danish Superliga: 2013–14
- Danish Cup: 2013–14

Silkeborg

- Danish Cup: 2023–24

Individual

- Danish Goalkeeper of the Year: 2014
- Danish Superliga Team of the Month: August 2023
- Danish Superliga Team of the Year: 2024–25
