= Viktor Ahlmann =

Danish footballer

Personal information
- Full name: Viktor Ahlmann Nielsen
- Date of birth: 3 January 1995 (age 31)
- Place of birth: Brønderslev, Denmark
- Position: Forward

Youth career
- AaB

Senior career*
| Years | Team | Apps | (Gls) |
| 2014–2016 | AaB | 7 | (0) |
| 2015 | → Vendsyssel (loan) | 9 | (0) |
| 2016 | → Jammerbugt (loan) | 16 | (9) |
| 2016 | Fram Larvik | 0 | (0) |
| 2017–2021 | Jammerbugt | 107 | (24) |
| Total | | 139 | (33) |

International career
| 2010–2011 | Denmark U16 | 8 | (4) |
| 2011–2012 | Denmark U17 | 12 | (4) |
| 2012–2013 | Denmark U18 | 5 | (1) |
| 2013–2014 | Denmark U19 | 6 | (1) |
| 2014 | Denmark U20 | 1 | (0) |
- * Club domestic league appearances and goals

Viktor Ahlmann Nielsen (born 3 January 1995) is a Danish former professional footballer who played as a forward. He is the brother of fellow footballer Jakob Ahlmann Nielsen.

== Career ==
Ahlmann is a youth prospect of AaB. During the autumn holidays of 2008, Ahlmann, together with teammates from AaB, Lucas Andersen and Andreas Bruhn, participated in a trial at Premier League club Liverpool. He made his Danish Superliga debut on 19 July 2014 against SønderjyskE where he was substituted in for Anders K. Jacobsen in the 82nd minute. He played seven league games in AaB. In the fall of 2015, Ahlmann was sent on loan to Vendsyssel FF. In the spring of 2016, he was sent on a six-month loan to Jammerbugt FC, where he scored nine goals in 16 appearances.

After his contract expired with AaB, he signed with Norwegian club IF Fram Larvik in August 2016. He, however, announced on social media that he had decided to take a break from football only one month after joining Fram, due to a lack of motivation for professional football.

Ahlmann returned to football in February 2017, signing with his former side Jammerbugt FC in the third-tier Danish 2nd Division. Ahlmann left Jammerbugt at the end of the 2020–21 season, and subsequently retired from football altogether.
