= Kayke =

Brazilian footballer

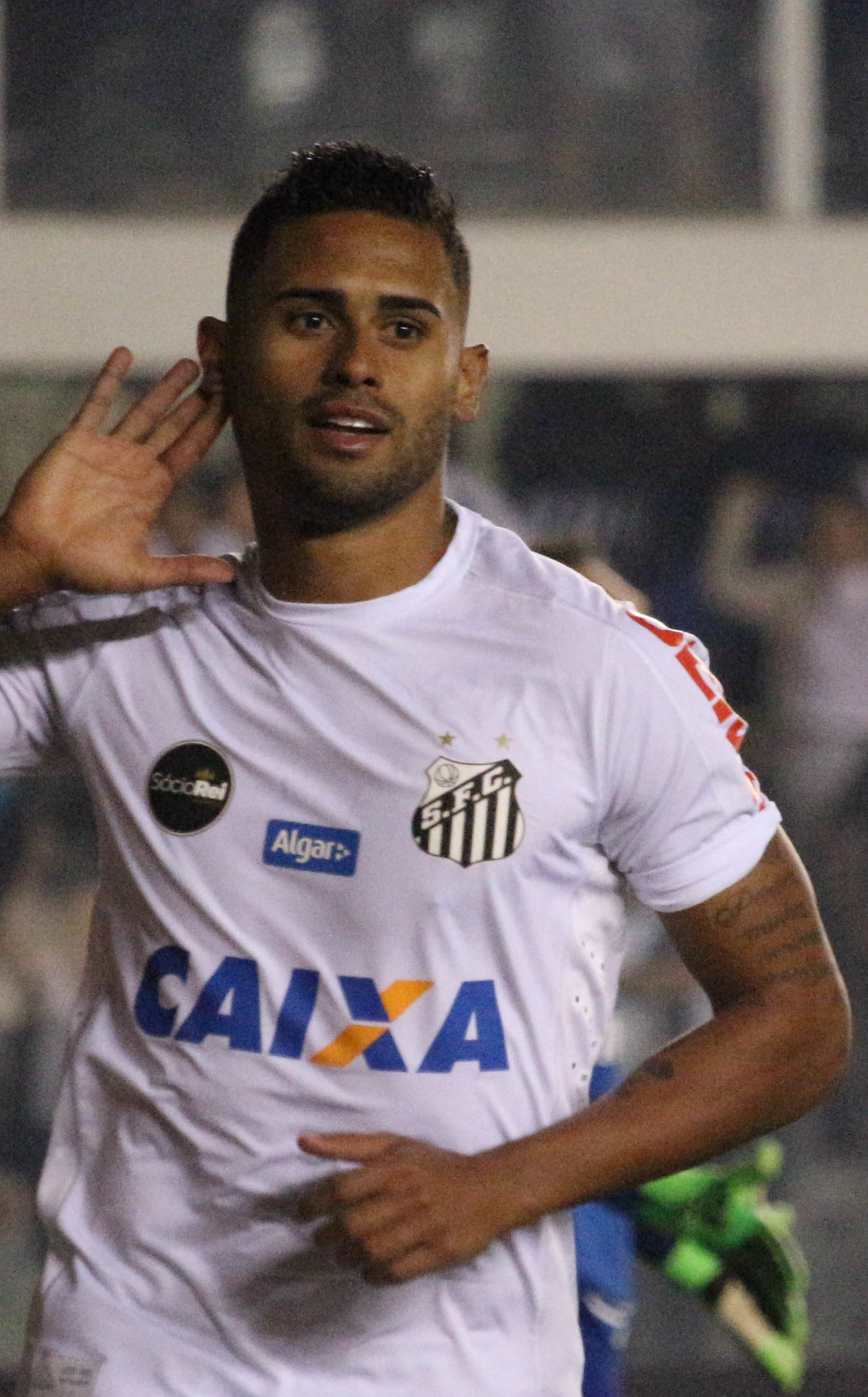
- Kayke with Santos in 2017

Personal information
- Full name: Kayke Moreno de Andrade Rodrigues
- Date of birth: 1 April 1988 (age 38)
- Place of birth: Brasília, Brazil
- Height: 1.82 m (6 ft 0 in)
- Position: Forward

Team information
- Current team: Uberlândia
- Number: 9

Youth career
- 1993–1996: Minas Brasília
- 1996–1997: CFZ-RJ
- 1997–2007: Flamengo

Senior career*
Years	Team	Apps	(Gls)
2007–2009	Flamengo	4	(0)
2008	→ Brasiliense (loan)	7	(0)
2009	→ Macaé (loan)	0	(0)
2009	Vila Nova	1	(0)
2010	→ BK Häcken (loan)	5	(0)
2010	→ Tromsø IL (loan)	10	(5)
2011	→ AaB (loan)	9	(3)
2011–2013	AaB	32	(6)
2013	Paraná	16	(3)
2014	Nacional	2	(0)
2014	Atlético Goianiense	16	(4)
2015	ABC	14	(8)
2015	Flamengo	16	(6)
2016–2018	Yokohama F. Marinos	23	(4)
2017	→ Santos (loan)	26	(3)
2018	→ Bahia (loan)	3	(0)
2018	→ Fluminense (loan)	9	(0)
2019	Goiás	19	(6)
2019–2020	Qatar SC	21	(7)
2020–2021	Umm Salal	15	(7)
2021–2022	Al-Khor	4	(0)
2022	Al Urooba	6	(0)
2022–2023	Sport Recife	29	(5)
2023	→ Chapecoense (loan)	19	(3)
2024	São Bernardo	34	(12)
2025–2026	Figueirense	29	(6)
2025	→ Volta Redonda (loan)	12	(0)
2026–	Uberlândia	17	(3)
- * Club domestic league appearances and goals as of 19 November 2026

Kayke Moreno de Andrade Rodrigues (born 1 April 1988), simply known as Kayke, is a Brazilian professional footballer who plays as a forward for Uberlândia.

== Club career ==
=== Early career ===
Kayke was born in Brasília, Federal District, and started his career in futsal with Minas Brasília Tênis Clube. Arriving in Rio de Janeiro in 1996 at the age of eight, he represented CFZ before joining Flamengo's youth setup in 1997.

Promoted to the first team in 2007 along with Thiago Sales, Kayke made his first team – and Série A – debut on 16 June by coming on as a substitute for Toró in a 2–2 home win against Internacional. He appeared in a further three matches during the campaign, all from the bench, as his side finished third.

On 28 April 2008, Kayke was loaned to Série B club Brasiliense until the end of the year. After being rarely used, he returned to his parent club on 14 October. He was subsequently loaned to Macaé the following 19 March, but his loan was cut short after the end of 2009 Campeonato Carioca.

Kayke remained unused at Fla until the end of his contract, and joined Vila Nova in September 2009. He only featured in one match for the club, a 1–2 away loss against former club Brasiliense on 28 November, before leaving.

=== Sweden and Norway ===
Kayke moved abroad for the first time in his career in February 2010, joining Swedish Allsvenskan side BK Häcken. He made his debut for the club on 10 April, replacing Jonas Henriksson in a 0–0 home draw against Åtvidabergs FF.

Kayke switched teams and countries again on 12 July 2010, signing for Norwegian Tippeligaen club Tromsø IL. In his home debut on 22 August he scored two goals, in a 3–1 win against Odd Grenland; one of his goals was acclaimed the best goal of the 2010 Tippeligaen.

Kayke's other goals came on 19 September 2010, a hat-trick in a 5–3 away success over Sandefjord. After five goals in ten matches, he left the club.

=== AaB ===
Kayke moved to AaB on 4 March 2011. On 20 May, he scored a brace in a 3–4 away loss against Silkeborg IF. After three goals in nine matches, he signed a new contract until 2013 on 1 September.

Mainly used as a substitute, Kayke only scored three further goals for AaB before leaving after his contract expired.

=== Paraná and Nacional ===
On 12 July 2013, Kayke was presented at Paraná in the second division. He made a goalscoring debut in a 3–1 home win against Boa Esporte, and added another one in a 4–0 home routing of Guaratinguetá late in the month.

On 8 January 2014, after being a regular starter at Paraná, Kayke signed a six-month contract with C.D. Nacional, with a three-year optional clause. He made his debut for the club on 12 April, replacing Djaniny in a 2–0 home win against C.S. Marítimo; he only featured in one further match for the club before leaving.

=== Back to Brazil ===
On 18 August 2014 Kayke joined Atlético Goianiense back in this homeland. He scored four goals in 16 league matches before departing.

On 18 January 2015, Kayke moved to ABC also in the second tier. He was elected as the best player of the year's Campeonato Potiguar, after scoring 12 goals in only 17 matches. In the ensuing Série B, he maintained the goalscoring rate by netting eight goals in 14 appearances.

=== Flamengo return ===
On 6 August 2015, after impressing during his time at ABC, Kayke returned to his first club Flamengo after an agreement was reached. On 2 September, in only his third match for the club, he scored his first goals in the main category by netting a brace in a 3–0 home win against Avaí.

Kayke scored another brace on 8 November 2015, in a 4–1 home routing of Goiás. The following 6 January, during the club's first day of training ahead of the new season, he was diagnosed with a knee injury.

=== Yokohama F. Marinos ===
On 7 March 2016, Kayke was sold to J1 League club Yokohama F. Marinos, for a rumoured fee of R$ 7.4 million. He made his debut for the club on 2 April by starting in a 2–1 away win against Gamba Osaka, and scored his first goal fourteen days later in a 5–1 routing at Júbilo Iwata.

==== Santos (loan) ====
On 8 January 2017, Kayke returned to his home country after agreeing to a one-year loan deal with Santos. He made his official debut for the club on 12 February, coming off the bench and scoring the winner in a 3–2 Campeonato Paulista away success over Red Bull Brasil.

Mainly a backup option to Ricardo Oliveira, Kayke scored a brace in a 3–1 win against Grêmio Novorizontino, the first coming through a penalty kick. With Oliveira out injured he became a regular starter for the club, and also scored another two braces against Atlético Paranaense, one in a 2–0 away win on 12 June and another on a 3–2 away success on 5 July.

=== Al Urooba ===
On 1 February 2022, signed with Emirati Club Al Urooba.

== Career statistics ==
As of 13 November 2019

Club	Season	League			Cup		Continental		Other		Total	
Club	Season	Division	Apps	Goals	Apps	Goals	Apps	Goals	Apps	Goals	Apps	Goals
Flamengo	2007	Série A	4	0	0	0	—		0	0	4	0
Brasiliense (loan)	2008	Série B	7	0	0	0	—		—		7	0
Macaé (loan)	2009	Série D	0	0	—		—		4 (Note: Appearance(s) in Campeonato Carioca.)	1	4	1
Vila Nova	2009	Série B	1	0	—		—		—		1	0
Häcken (loan)	2010	Allsvenskan	5	0	1	2	—		—		6	2
Tromsø (loan)	2010	Tippeligaen	10	5	—		—		—		10	5
AaB (loan)	2010–11	Superliga	9	3	—		—		—		9	3
AaB (loan)	2011–12	Superliga	17	2	—		—		—		17	2
AaB (loan)	2012–13	Superliga	6	1	1	0	—		—		7	1
AaB (loan)	Total		32	6	1	0	0	0	0	0	33	6
Paraná	2013	Série B	16	3	—		—		—		16	3
Nacional	2013–14	Primeira Liga	2	0	—		—		—		2	0
Atlético Goianiense	2014	Série B	16	4	—		—		—		16	4
ABC	2015	Série B	14	8	4	0	—		17 (Note: Appearance(s) in Campeonato Potiguar.)	12	35	20
Flamengo	2015	Série A	16	6	—		—		—		16	6
Yokohama F. Marinos	2016	J1 League	23	4	5	1	—		—		28	5
Santos (loan)	2017	Série A	26	3	2	1	5 (Note: Appearance(s) in Copa Libertadores.)	2	9 (Note: Appearance(s) in Campeonato Paulista.)	3	42	9
Bahia (loan)	2018	Série A	3	0	1	0	0	0	13 (Note: Seven appearances in Campeonato Baiano, Six appearances and one goal in Copa do Nordeste.)	1	17	1
Fluminense (loan)	2018	Série A	9	0	—		—		—		9	0
Goiás	2019	Série A	19	6	—		—		—		19	6
Qatar SC	2019–20	Stars League	5	1	1	2	—		—		6	3
Career total			208	46	15	6	5	2	43	17	271	71

== Honours ==
=== Club ===
Bahia

- Campeonato Baiano: 2018

Sport

- Campeonato Pernambucano: 2023

=== Individual ===
- Campeonato Potiguar Best player: 2015
- Campeonato Potiguar Best forward: 2015
- Campeonato Potiguar Top scorer: 2015
