= Oliver Thychosen =

Danish footballer (born 1993)

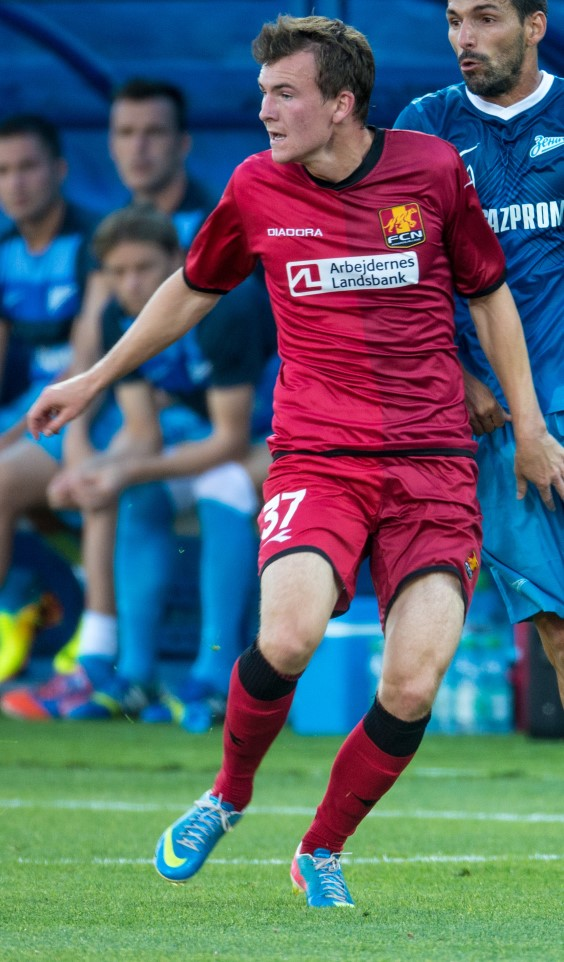

Personal information
- Full name: Oliver Eyro Thychosen
- Date of birth: 17 January 1993 (age 33)
- Place of birth: Vejle, Denmark
- Height: 1.84 m (6 ft 0 in)
- Position: Left winger

Youth career
- Vejle

Senior career*
Years	Team	Apps	(Gls)
2011	Vejle	3	(1)
2011–2013	Vejle-Kolding	28	(7)
2013–2016	Nordsjælland	36	(3)
2016	→ Vejle (loan)	9	(2)
2016–2019	Viborg	36	(4)
2019–2022	Hobro	26	(1)

International career
2010–2011	Denmark U-18	7	(1)
2011–2012	Denmark U-19	7	(1)
2012	Denmark U-20	1	(0)
2013	Denmark U-21	2	(0)
- * Club domestic league appearances and goals

Oliver Eyro Thychosen (born 17 January 1993) is a Danish retired professional footballer.

== Club career ==
=== Vejle BK & Vejle-Kolding ===
Thychosen got his debut for the first team at the age of 18 on 14 May 2011, where he came on the pitch and replaced Kim Olsen in the 87th minute. He scored his first goal for the first team in the same match, in the 89th minute.

=== FC Nordsjælland ===
On 3 July 2013, FC Nordsjælland confirmed that they had purchased Thychosen.

His injuries continued at his new club, and for this reason, he only played 13 matches in the league, in his first season.

==== Loan to Vejle BK ====
On 1 February 2016, Vejle confirmed that they had signed their former player, Thychosen, on a loan deal for the rest of the season.

=== Hobro IK ===
After joining Viborg FF in the summer 2016, Tychosen left the club after three years to join Hobro IK. The deal was announced on 20 June 2019.

On 21 May 2022 it was confirmed, that 29-year old Thychosen would retire at the end of the season. Thychosen subsequently revealed in an interview that since his cruciate ligament injury in 2016, he had been having problems with his knee, which was the reason he had to retire.
