= Mathias Wichmann =

Danish footballer (born 1991)

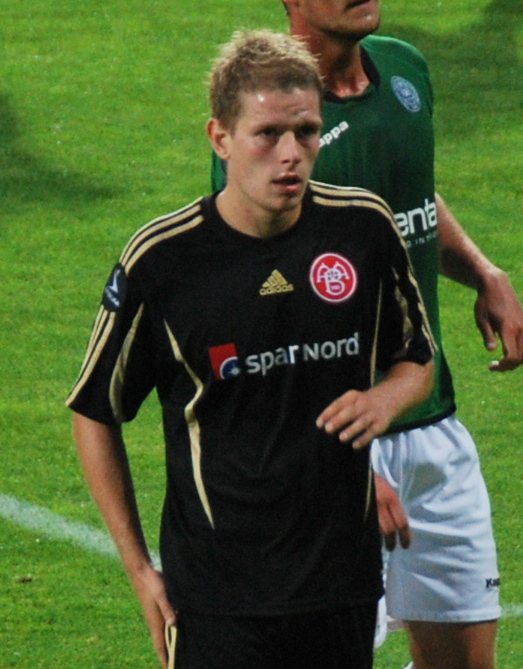
- Mathias Wichmann in August 2011. (Photo: Lars Schmidt)

Personal information
- Full name: Mathias Wichmann Andersen
- Date of birth: 6 August 1991 (age 35)
- Place of birth: Gug, Aalborg, Denmark
- Height: 1.83 m (6 ft 0 in)
- Position: Midfielder

Team information
- Current team: Jerv
- Number: 6

Youth career
- B52/Aalborg
- 2006–2009: AaB

Senior career*
Years	Team	Apps	(Gls)
2009–2015	AaB	108	(5)
2015–2017	Viborg FF	41	(1)
2017–	Jerv	233	(18)

International career
2011	Denmark U21	3	(0)
- * Club domestic league appearances and goals as of 3 November 2025

Mathias Wichmann Andersen (born 6 August 1991 in Gug, Aalborg) is a Danish footballer who plays as a midfielder for Jerv. His main assets is his vision, ability to keep the ball and using his technique.

== Honours ==
=== Club ===
AaB

- Danish Superliga (1): 2013–14
- Danish Cup (1): 2013–14
