= Nicolaj Thomsen =

Danish footballer (born 1993)

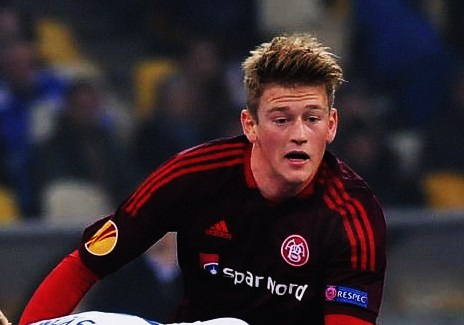
- Thomsen playing for AaB in 2014

Personal information
- Date of birth: 8 May 1993 (age 33)
- Place of birth: Skagen, Denmark
- Height: 1.80 m (5 ft 11 in)
- Position: Midfielder

Youth career
- –2006: Skagen IK
- 2006–2009: Frederikshavn fI
- 2009–2011: AaB

Senior career*
Years	Team	Apps	(Gls)
2011–2016	AaB	122	(10)
2016	Nantes	13	(1)
2016	Nantes II	2	(0)
2017–2021	Copenhagen	65	(3)
2021	Vålerenga	12	(1)
2021	Vålerenga 2	5	(0)
2022	SønderjyskE	14	(1)
2022–2025	B.93	87	(18)
Total		320	(34)

International career
2011	Denmark U18	4	(0)
2011–2012	Denmark U19	7	(0)
2013–2015	Denmark U21	21	(3)
2014	Denmark	1	(0)
- * Club domestic league appearances and goals

Nicolaj Thomsen (born 8 May 1993) is a Danish former professional footballer who played as a midfielder.

Thomsen was born in Skagen and played youth football with Skagen IK and Frederikshavn fI before starting his professional career with AaB. After moving to French Ligue 1 club FC Nantes in 2016, he had a four-year stint with FC Copenhagen. Thomsen moved to Norwegian club Vålerenga in 2021, before returning to Denmark again, signing with SønderjyskE in January 2022. In September 2022, he joined Danish third tier club B.93, helping them to promotion in his first season.

A Danish youth international, Thomsen has won one cap with the Denmark national team.

== Club career ==
=== Early career ===
Thomsen played for Skagen IK before he moved to Frederikshavn fI when he was 13 years old. Three years later, at the age of 16, he moved to the AaB academy.

=== AaB ===
Thomsen made his debut for AaB in the Danish Superliga as a starter in a 1–2 loss against Midtjylland on 4 April 2012. In his first season, he made six appearances, five of which were as a substitute. He scored his first goal for AaB in a 4–1 victory over Randers on 12 November 2013 in his 42nd Superliga appearance.

In April 2014, Thomsen extended his contract so that it ran until 31 December 2016. Kent Nielsen, AaB's head coach at the time, stated that Thomsen "has everything that is demanded of a modern football player in top football. Relentless energy and a fine technique."

=== Nantes ===
After five seasons in AaB, Thomsen signed with FC Nantes in the French Ligue 1 in June 2016. According to Tipsbladet, the price was DKK 3.9 million, which could increase to DKK 4.5 million depending on performance. In the summer transfer window of 2015, Thomsen had also been close to moving to the French club, but negotiations were slowed down as Thomsen suffers from lazy eye which means that he has a decreased eyesight of 90% in his right eye.

Thomsen made 13 appearances for the club before returning to Denmark in January 2017.

=== Copenhagen ===
On 12 January 2017, it was announced that Thomsen had signed a three-and-a-half-year contract with Copenhagen, expiring in June 2021. He made his debut for the club on 15 July 2017 in a 1–1 league draw against his former team AaB, coming on as a substitute in the second half for Kasper Kusk.

Thomsen scored his first goal for Copenhagen on 12 August 2018 in a Copenhagen Derby against Brøndby, establishing a 2–1 lead in the 77th minute after an assist by Viktor Fischer. The game finished 3–1.

His contract was not renewed when it expired in June 2021. Thomsen made a total of 90 appearances for Copenhagen, but his stint was plagued by injuries.

=== Vålerenga ===
On 5 August 2021, Thomsen signed with Norwegian Eliteserien club Vålerenga on a six-month contract. He made his debut for the club on 15 August in a 1–1 league draw away against Tromsø IL, replacing the suspended Christian Borchgrevink at right back. On 24 October, he scored his first goal for the club to secure a 2–1 win over Haugesund in the domestic league. He left the Norwegian club at the end of the year.

=== SønderjyskE ===
On 24 January 2022, Thomsen joined SønderjyskE on a deal until June 2024. He made his full debut on 18 February, providing an assist to Stefan Gartenmann in a 3–2 home loss to AGF. The following week, he was sent off early in a 1–0 league loss to Brøndby after receiving his second yellow card due to a challenge on Carl Björk. After a season, which ended with relegation, Thomsen left the club as he chose to terminate his contract due to a clause in his contract.

=== B.93 ===
On 19 September 2022 it was confirmed, that Thomsen had signed a two-year deal with Danish 2nd Division side B.93. He made his debut for the club on 25 September, coming on as a substitute in a 3–1 loss against AB. He started in the following league match, scoring a brace and providing an assist, helping B.93 to a 4–0 victory against Brabrand IF.

On 7 June 2023, Thomsen signed a contract extension, keeping him at B.93 until 2025. He finished his first season at the club with 10 goals in 23 appearances, as the club reached promotion to the Danish second tier on 17 June after a 1–1 draw against Thisted FC.

On 1 December 2025, Thomsen announced his retirement from football. However, he will continue at B.93, where he will become Creative Lead with a focus on continuing the club's creative direction.

== International career ==
Nicolai Thomsen made his first international appearance on 1 March 2011, when he played for Denmark U18. Since then, he has played for U19 and U21, before getting his first match for the Danish national team on 18 November 2014 against Romania.

Thomsen scored the only Danish goal in the 1–1 draw against Iceland which qualified Denmark U-21 for the 2015 UEFA European Under-21 Championship. He was selected for the squad for the tournament and played the entire match in the opening win against the Czech Republic. He was in the line-up in the other two group stage-matches against Germany and Serbia. Thomsen was also chosen to the line-up in the semi-final, where Denmark was defeated by Sweden.

== Personal life ==
Thomsen started his own menswear brand, Another Aspect, alongside childhood friends Anders Poulsen and Daniel Brøndt in 2019. They opened their own store in Vesterbro, Copenhagen, in 2019, before moving to another location on Værnedamsvej.

== Career statistics ==
=== Club ===
Appearances and goals by club, season and competition
Club	Season	League			National cup (Note: Includes Danish Cup, Norwegian Football Cup)		League cup (Note: Includes Coupe de la Ligue)		Europe		Other		Total	
Club	Season	Division	Apps	Goals	Apps	Goals	Apps	Goals	Apps	Goals	Apps	Goals	Apps	Goals
AaB	2011–12	Superliga	6	0	0	0	—		—		—		6	0
AaB	2012–13	Superliga	21	0	2	0	—		—		—		23	0
AaB	2013–14	Superliga	33	4	5	2	—		2 (Note: Appearances in UEFA Europa League)	0	—		40	6
AaB	2014–15	Superliga	29	0	1	0	—		12 (Note: Four appearances, one goal in UEFA Champions League; eight appearances, two goals in UEFA Europa League)	3	—		42	3
AaB	2015–16	Superliga	33	6	6	4	—		—		—		39	10
AaB	Total		122	10	14	6	—		14	3	—		150	19
Nantes	2016–17	Ligue 1	13	1	0	0	2	0	—		—		15	1
Nantes II	2016–17	CFA 2	2	0	—		—		—		—		2	0
Copenhagen	2017–18	Superliga	17	0	0	0	—		5 (Note: Three appearances in UEFA Champions League; two appearances in UEFA Europa League)	0	0	0	22	0
Copenhagen	2018–19	Superliga	29	3	1	0	—		6	0	—		36	3
Copenhagen	2019–20	Superliga	13	0	2	0	—		6 (Note: One appearance in UEFA Champions League; five appearances, one goal in UEFA Europa League)	1	—		21	1
Copenhagen	2020–21	Superliga	6	0	1	0	—		0	0	—		7	0
Copenhagen	Total		65	3	4	0	—		17	1	0	0	86	4
Vålerenga	2021	Eliteserien	12	1	1	0	—		0	0	—		13	1
Vålerenga 2	2021	2. divisjon	5	0	—		—		—		—		5	0
SønderjyskE	2021–22	Superliga	14	1	2	0	—		—		—		16	1
B.93	2022–23	2nd Division	23	10	0	0	—		—		—		23	10
B.93	2023–24	1st Division	29	7	2	0	—		—		—		31	7
B.93	2024–25	1st Division	24	1	2	0	—		—		—		26	1
B.93	2025–26	1st Division	11	0	2	0	—		—		—		13	0
B.93	Total		87	18	6	0	—		—		—		93	18
Career total			320	34	27	6	2	0	21	4	0	0	370	44

=== International ===
As of match played 18 November 2014

Appearances and goals by national team and year
National team	Year	Apps	Goals
Denmark	2014	1	0
Total		1	0

== Honours ==
AaB

- Danish Superliga: 2013–14
- Danish Cup: 2013–14

Copenhagen

- Danish Superliga: 2016–17, 2018–19
- Danish Cup: 2016–17
