= Simon Bræmer =

Danish footballer (born 1984)

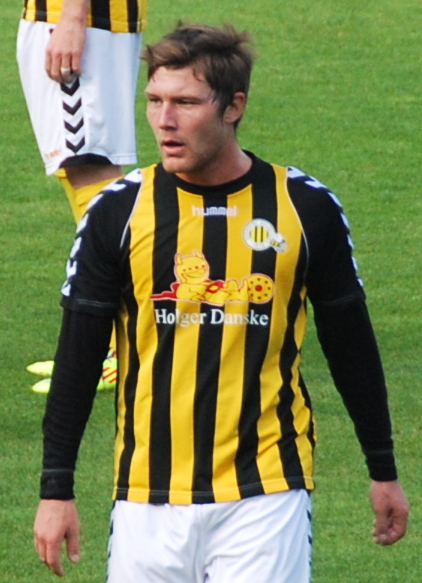
- Bræmer in 2011

Personal information
- Date of birth: 19 March 1984 (age 42)
- Place of birth: Vrå, Denmark
- Height: 1.76 m (5 ft 9 in)
- Position: Forward

Team information
- Current team: Skovshoved (player-assistant)
- Number: 23

Youth career
- Vrå/Børglum IF
- AaB

Senior career*
Years	Team	Apps	(Gls)
2002–2008	AaB	67	(22)
2002–2003	→ Hjørring (loan)	13	(13)
2004	→ Silkeborg (loan)	12	(1)
2007	→ Moss (loan)	10	(7)
2009–2010	AB	14	(11)
2010	Viborg	9	(1)
2011	Hvidovre	14	(4)
2011–2013	Brønshøj	55	(22)
2013–2016	AB	47	(13)
2016–2019	Skovshoved		
2019–2021	FC Græsrødderne		
2022–	Skovshoved		

International career
2000	Denmark U-16	2	(0)
2002	Denmark U-18	1	(0)
2003–2004	Denmark U-20	3	(0)
2005–2006	Denmark U-21	6	(1)

Managerial career
- 2022–: Skovshoved (player-assistant)
- * Club domestic league appearances and goals

Simon Bræmer (born 19 March 1984) is a Danish professional football player and current playing-assistant coach of Skovshoved IF. Bræmer began his career as a forward with AaB Aalborg and has since played for Hjørring IF, Silkeborg IF, Akademisk Boldklub, Viborg FF, Brønshøj BK, and FC Græsrødderne.

== Career ==
Bræmer started his professional career with AaB Aalborg (AaB) in the top-flight Danish Superliga. He got his first try at senior football, when he spent the 2002–03 season on loan at Hjørring IF. The loan was a success, and having returned to AaB, Bræmer got his Superliga debut in August 2003. In December 2003, he prolonged his AaB contract until December 2005. He played seven games in his debut season for AaB, before signing a loan deal with Superliga rivals Silkeborg IF for the first half of the 2004–05 Superliga season. He played 12 of 15 games for Silkeborg and scored one goal in his last game for the club.

Back at AaB, Bræmer took over from forward David Nielsen, and got his national breakthrough. In seven games from May to June 2005, Bræmer scored 11 goals and helped the club finish in fourth place of the 2004–05 Superliga. He was the seventh highest goalscorer of that Superliga season. In late June 2005, Bræmer signed a three-year extension of his AaB contract. Bræmer did not have an equally successful 2005–06 Superliga season, scoring eight goals.

He was dropped from the starting line-up by AaB manager Erik Hamrén during the 2006–07 Superliga season, with Swedish international forward Rade Prica taking his place. When AaB bought Brazilian forward José Mota in January 2007, Bræmer announced his desire to leave AaB. On 29 December 2008 he left Aalborg and moved to Akademisk Boldklub. On 13 July 2010 and the end of his contract left Akademisk Boldklub.

In autumn 2010 he played for Viborg FF, however after a disappointing half season with the club, he left to play for league rivals Hvidovre IF in the spring. At Hvidovre he played some of the best football since he left AaB, according to himself, scoring 4 goals in 14 matches in the process.

On 5 August 2011 he signed a contract with Danish 1st Division side Brønshøj BK. In his two seasons here he ended up as the team's top scorer in both.

In July 2019, Bræmer joined FC Græsrødderne. In March 2022, he returned to Skovshoved IF. On 2 August 2022, he was appointed player-assistant coach for Skovshoved.

=== International career ===
He has played 12 games and scored one goal for various Danish youth national selections, most recently the Denmark national under-21 football team. He was called up for the Danish under-21 national team in June 2005. He made his debut under-21 against the Finland u-21s.
