= Stephan Petersen =

Danish footballer (born 1985)

Personal information
- Full name: Stephen Petersen
- Date of birth: 15 November 1985 (age 40)
- Place of birth: Frederiksberg, Denmark
- Height: 1.87 m (6 ft 2 in)
- Position: Winger

Youth career
- Torslunde-Ishøj IF
- SB 50 Ishøj

Senior career*
Years	Team	Apps	(Gls)
2003–2005	Køge Boldklub	18	(4)
2005–2009	Nordsjælland	70	(7)
2010–2017	AGF	166	(28)
2017–2019	Silkeborg	47	(9)
2019–2021	HB Køge	39	(3)
2021	Karlslunde	7	(1)
Total		347	(52)
- * Club domestic league appearances and goals

Stephan Petersen (born 15 November 1985) is a Danish retired professional footballer who played as a winger.

== Career ==
Born in Frederiksberg, Petersen made his senior debut for Køge Boldklub in 2003 before moving to Nordsjælland two years later, on 9 July 2005, at the age of 19. He made his debut shortly after, on 20 July, in a match against SønderjyskE. Already after half a year in Nordsjælland, Petersen signed a four-year contract extension with the club until the end of 2009.

Petersen signed with AGF on a free transfer on 1 January 2010. He played at AGF for seven years, in which he totalled 235 appearances and scored 35 goals. Petersen joined Silkeborg IF on 1 July 2017. He left the club at the end of the 2018–19 season to join HB Køge.

On 4 January 2021, Petersen signed with amateur club Karlslunde IF competing in the fourth-tier Denmark Series, effectively retiring from professional football. At the end of May 2021, in a game against Allerød FK, Petersen was badly injured in the knee and in July 2021 it was confirmed, that he had torn his cruciate ligament and therefore had retired for the last time.
