= Søren Frederiksen (footballer, born 1989) =

Danish footballer (born 1989)

Personal information
- Full name: Søren Frederiksen
- Date of birth: 7 August 1989 (age 37)
- Place of birth: Sønderborg, Denmark
- Height: 1.85 m (6 ft 1 in)
- Position: Winger

Team information
- Current team: Brøndby (scout and analyst)

Youth career
- SUB Sønderborg
- SønderjyskE

Senior career*
| Years | Team | Apps | (Gls) |
| 2008–2010 | SønderjyskE | 32 | (4) |
| 2010–2013 | Copenhagen | 2 | (0) |
| 2010 | → SønderjyskE (loan) | 7 | (1) |
| 2011 | → SønderjyskE (loan) | 20 | (0) |
| 2012 | → Vejle Kolding (loan) | 5 | (0) |
| 2013–2015 | AaB | 42 | (5) |
| 2015–2016 | KR Reykjavík | 19 | (4) |
| 2016–2017 | Viborg | 42 | (6) |
| 2018–2020 | SønderjyskE | 29 | (3) |

International career
| 2009–2011 | Denmark U21 | 8 | (1) |

Managerial career
- 2017–2022: SønderjyskE (scout and analyst)
- 2022–: Brøndby (scout and analyst)
- * Club domestic league appearances and goals

Søren Frederiksen (born 7 August 1989) is a Danish former professional footballer who played as a winger.

== Career ==
Frederiksen played in SønderjyskE from 2006 to 2010. After his big breakthrough in the 2009–10 Danish Superliga, a transfer to F.C. Copenhagen on 1 July 2010 was announced, but he was supposed to continue in SønderjyskE for the 2010–11 season. Although, as Morten Nordstrand turned out to be injured for all 2010, F.C. Copenhagen and SønderjyskE agreed on 1 September 2010 to transfer Frederiksen immediately. He scored his first goal for Copenhagen in a Danish Cup game against Viby IF.

=== Later career ===
Frederiksen joined SønderjyskE in July 2017. Suffering with a knee injury for a long period, Frederiksen announced on 24 February 2020 that he would retire immediately and continue in a scout, analytic and coach/leader position at SønderjyskE.

In the summer of 2022, he joined Brøndby IF in a similar role.

== Honours ==
=== Club ===
FC Copenhagen

- Danish Superliga: 2010–11

AaB

- Danish Superliga: 2013–14
- Danish Cup: 2013–14

SønderjyskE

- Danish Cup: 2019–20
