= Carsten Christensen =

Danish footballer (born 1986)

Personal information
- Full name: Carsten Christensen
- Date of birth: 28 August 1986 (age 40)
- Place of birth: Denmark
- Height: 1.89 m (6 ft 2 in)
- Position: Goalkeeper

Team information
- Current team: Fredericia (goalkeeper coach)

Senior career*
Years	Team	Apps	(Gls)
2006–2008	Sønderjyske		
2008–2011	Fredericia	0	(0)
2011–2017	AaB	3	(0)

Managerial career
- 2024–: Fredericia (goalkeeper coach)
- * Club domestic league appearances and goals

Carsten Christensen (born 28 August 1986) is a Danish retired goalkeeper and current goalkeeper coach of FC Fredericia.

Christensen has represented SønderjyskE and FC Fredericia. AaB was his last club.

== Career ==
He made his debut for AaB against OB in a 2–1 win.

== Honours ==
=== Club ===
AaB

- Danish Superliga (1): 2013–14
- Danish Cup (1): 2013–14
