= André Bjerregaard =

Danish footballer (born 1991)

Personal information
- Full name: André Bjerregaard
- Date of birth: 3 September 1991 (age 35)
- Place of birth: Denmark
- Height: 1.88 m (6 ft 2 in)
- Position: Forward

Team information
- Current team: Holstebro

Youth career
- Herning Fremad
- Horsens

Senior career*
Years	Team	Apps	(Gls)
2010–2017	Horsens	157	(18)
2017–2018	KR Reykjavík	22	(8)
2018	Hvidovre	12	(2)
2019–2021	Skive	49	(7)
2021–2022	Middelfart	13	(1)
2022–	Holstebro		
- * Club domestic league appearances and goals as of 15:40, 9 January 2022 (UTC)

André Bjerregaard (born 3 September 1991) is a Danish professional footballer who plays as a forward for Holstebro Boldklub.

== Club career ==
=== Horsens ===
Bjerregaard came to AC Horsens from Herning Fremad as a youth player. He signed his first professional contract at the age of 18 in July 2010. Bjerregaard played 6 matches in the Danish Superliga for the club in that season.

In the next season, he extended his contract in May 2011 until 2014. The striker had some injuries during the season, but played 9 league matches for the club.

He got his breakthrough in the 2011/12 season, where he played 28 league matches, scoring 2 goals. Though his low scoring-rate, he extended his contract once again. This time in January 2014 until 2016.

Bjerregaard was often described as a "pestilence for the opponent" because of his effort.

=== KR Reykjavík ===
On 11 July 2017, Bjerregaard was officially sold to Icelandic club KR Reykjavík.

=== Hvidovre ===
On 3 September 2018, Bjerregaard signed for Hvidovre IF.

=== Skive ===
Skive IK signed Bjerregaard on 12 January 2019.

=== Holstebro ===
On 1 February 2022 it was confirmed, that Bjerregaard had joined Denmark Series club Holstebro Boldklub.
