= Nicklas Helenius =

Danish footballer (born 1991)

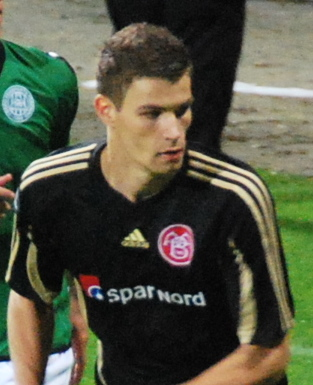
- Helenius playing for AaB in 2011

Personal information
- Full name: Nicklas Helenius Jensen
- Date of birth: 8 May 1991 (age 35)
- Place of birth: Svenstrup, Denmark
- Height: 1.95 m (6 ft 5 in)
- Position: Forward

Team information
- Current team: AaB
- Number: 9

Youth career
- Svenstrup-Godthåb IF
- 2005–2010: AaB

Senior career*
Years	Team	Apps	(Gls)
2010–2013	AaB	95	(34)
2013–2015	Aston Villa	3	(0)
2014–2015	→ AaB (loan)	32	(8)
2015–2017	AaB	13	(0)
2016	→ SC Paderborn (loan)	14	(4)
2016–2017	→ Silkeborg (loan)	27	(9)
2017–2019	OB	54	(14)
2019–2020	AGF	39	(3)
2021–2023	Silkeborg	59	(32)
2023–	AaB	75	(20)

International career
2011	Denmark U20	2	(1)
2011–2013	Denmark U21	11	(4)
2012	Denmark	2	(0)
- * Club domestic league appearances and goals as of 2 June 2026

Nicklas Helenius Jensen (born 8 May 1991) is a Danish professional footballer who plays as a forward for Danish 1st Division club AaB.

== Club career ==
=== Aalborg BK ===
Helenius joined the Aalborg BK youth squad at the age of 13 and received his first contract while in the U19 squad. In the 2009–10 season, he became the top goalscorer of the Aalborg BK under-19 squad in the Danish under-19 league with 22 goals. This was enough for him to finish second on the overall goal scorer list, only beaten by Brent McGrath who scored 29 goals for Brøndby IF.

After the 2009–10 season, he made his professional football debut for Aalborg BK on 16 May 2010 against HB Køge. Helenius scored his first goal for Aalborg BK in the Danish Superliga on 10 September 2010 against AC Horsens and got his first breakthrough in the AaB lineup after scoring a total of four goals in four consecutive league games and one goal in the Danish Cup in October and November 2010.

Following the 2012–13 season, he was selected as player of the season in the Danish Superliga on the UEFA website.

A popular chant amongst the AaB supporters was "vi elsker vold og kokain – og Nicklas Helenius", directly translated to "we love violence and cocaine – and Nicklas Helenius", as a sarcastic reference to the hooligan culture. The chant was based on the tune Eviva Espana.

=== Aston Villa ===
On 18 June 2013, Helenius signed for Aston Villa on a three-year deal believed to be in the region of £1.2m. He scored a header on his debut in Villa's first pre-season game of the season, against German team SV Rödinghausen. He followed this up with another headed goal against VfL Bochum on his second appearance for the club. He made his Premier League debut on 24 August 2013 at Villa Park against Liverpool which ended in a 1–0 defeat. Helenius scored his first goal for the club on 4 January 2014 against Sheffield United in an FA Cup third round tie at Villa Park. Helenius gained notoriety when he got his shorts pulled down by Jan Vertonghen in a game against Tottenham Hotspur, revealing his briefs.

After only three league games for Aston Villa in the first half season, Helenius was expected to leave the club. Helenius failed to become a regular part of the match day squad and would often not even be included. With a lack of interest from suitable buyers he found himself seeing the season out in the sidelines, only making one appearance in the 2014 campaign in an FA Cup game against Sheffield United F.C where he also scored his only goal for Aston Villa. Helenius' agent revealed in May 2014, that Helenius was not a part of Aston Villa's future plans and therefore had to leave the club. Helenius revealed that a reason behind his struggles were a bacterial infection and an addiction to sleeping pills. Helenius had many clubs interested, like IFK Göteborg and AaB. Aston Villa also rejected a bid from IFK Göteborg.

==== Loan to AaB ====
On 9 July 2014, Helenius returned to his previous club AaB on a season long loan deal. He was very happy to be back and expected a turbulent season with a two-digit number of goals. He had a good season with 14 goals in 43 games and he was set to make the transfer permanent, as Aston Villa did not want to keep him.

=== Return to AaB ===
Helenius joined AaB on a permanent transfer in July 2015. But in this season, opposite the last season, Helenius was the fourth choice and did not get much time on the pitch. A situation, that Helenius was not happy with, and he announced, that he would like to go out on loan.

==== Loan to SC Paderborn 07 ====
On 1 February 2016, it was confirmed that Helenius would play for SC Paderborn on loan from AaB. He played his first game for Paderborn on 5 February 2016 in a 1–0 loss against SV Sandhausen. Helenius got some playing time, and scored 4 league goals in 14 games.

==== Back to AaB ====
Helenius played the first three-season games for AaB, one from start and two from the bench. However, he was sent out on loan once again. His contract would expire in the summer 2017 and Helenius announced, that he would not be extending it. So he would be leaving the club after he was back from loan.

==== Loan to Silkeborg IF ====
On 10 August 2016, it was confirmed, that Helenius was loaned out to Silkeborg IF for the whole season. He played 29 league games and scored 10 goals in this season.

=== OB ===
On 30 January 2017, it was confirmed that OB had signed Helenius from AaB, but first valid from when his contract expired with AaB in the summer of 2017.

=== AGF ===
On 7 July 2019, Helenius joined AGF on a three-year contract.

=== Return to Silkeborg ===
On 14 December 2020, Silkeborg IF confirmed that Helenius would return to the club from 2021 on a 3.5-year contract.

=== Return to AaB ===
In January 2023, Helenius returned to AaB, signing a deal until the end of 2025.

== International career ==
Helenius got his first international call up in January 2010 for the Danish under-19, but had to leave it due to an ankle sprain. One year later, he was called up to the Denmark U21 squad for a training camp in Dubai. He got his under-21 debut on 20 January 2011 in a training match against China. Helenius' goals at U-21 Level include the opening goal of the 3–0 victory over Northern Ireland in September 2011.

On 15 August 2012 he made his debut for the Denmark national football team against Slovakia.

== Career statistics ==
As of match played 18 April 2026

Appearances and goals by club, season and competition
Club	Season	League			National cup		League cup		Europe		Other		Total	
Club	Season	Division	Apps	Goals	Apps	Goals	Apps	Goals	Apps	Goals	Apps	Goals	Apps	Goals
AaB	2009–10	Danish Superliga	1	0	0	0	—		—		—		1	0
AaB	2010–11	Danish Superliga	29	5	2	1	—		—		—		31	6
AaB	2011–12	Danish Superliga	32	14	1	1	—		—		—		33	15
AaB	2012–13	Danish Superliga	33	16	2	2	—		—		—		35	18
AaB	Total		95	34	5	4	—		—		—		100	38
Aston Villa	2013–14	Premier League	3	0	1	1	2	0	—		—		6	1
AaB (loan)	2014–15	Danish Superliga	32	8	3	2	—		12 (Note: Four appearances in UEFA Champions League, eight appearances and two goals in UEFA Europa League)	2	—		47	12
AaB	2015–16	Danish Superliga	10	0	2	0	—		—		—		12	0
AaB	2016–17	Danish Superliga	3	0	0	0	—		—		—		3	0
AaB	Total		45	8	5	2	—		12	2	—		62	12
SC Paderborn (loan)	2015–16	2. Bundesliga	14	4	0	0	—		—		—		14	4
Silkeborg (loan)	2016–17	Danish Superliga	27	9	3	2	—		—		2 (Note: Appearance(s) in Danish Superliga play-off)	1	32	12
OB	2017–18	Danish Superliga	27	7	3	1	—		—		2	1	32	9
OB	2018–19	Danish Superliga	27	7	5	3	—		—		—		32	10
OB	Total		54	14	8	4	—		—		2	1	64	19
AGF	2019–20	Danish Superliga	29	3	2	1	—		—		1	0	32	4
AGF	2020–21	Danish Superliga	10	0	1	1	—		1 (Note: Appearances in UEFA Europa League)	0	—		12	1
AGF	Total		39	3	3	2	—		1	0	1	0	44	5
Silkeborg	2020–21	Danish 1st Division	13	10	—		—		—		—		13	10
Silkeborg	2021–22	Danish Superliga	29	17	1	1	—		—		—		30	18
Silkeborg	2022–23	Danish Superliga	17	5	2	1	—		8 (Note: Two appearances in UEFA Europa League, two appearances in UEFA Europa Conference League)	1	—		27	7
Silkeborg	Total		59	32	3	2	—		8	1	—		70	35
AaB	2022–23	Danish Superliga	15	1	5	1	—		—		—		20	2
AaB	2023–24	Danish 1st Division	22	7	2	2	—		—		—		24	9
AaB	2024–25	Danish Superliga	16	3	2	3	—		—		—		18	6
AaB	2025–26	Danish 1st Division	22	9	2	2	—		—		—		24	11
AaB	Total		75	20	11	8	—		—		—		86	28
Career total			411	124	39	25	2	0	21	3	5	2	478	154

== Honours ==
Individual

- Danish Superliga Golden Boot: 2021–22
