= 2013–14 Danish Cup =

DBU Pokalen (The DBU Cup)

Tournament details
- Country: Denmark

Final positions
- Champions: Aalborg BK
- Runners-up: FC København

The 2013–14 Danish Cup was the 60th season of the Danish Cup competition. It was the third season since its rebranding as the DBU Pokalen (The DBU Cup). The winner of the competition qualified for the play-off round of the 2014–15 UEFA Europa League.

== First round ==
94 teams were drawn into this round. Matches were played on 28 July and 6, 13-15, 20–21 August 2013.

Home team	Score	Away team
28 July
Rønne (5)	2–3	Avarta (3)
6 August
Otterup (4)	0–5	Fredericia (2)
13 August
Aars (5)	0–2	Jammerbugt (3)
Højslev Station (5)	1–6	Aalborg Chang (5)
Skagen (5)	0–4	Hobro (2)
Odder (3)	5–2 (a.e.t.)	Skanderborg (3)
Silkeborg KFUM (5)	3–4	Mejrup (5)
Aabyhøj (4)	0–1	Viby (4)
KRFK (5)	0–1	Stjernen (5)
Oure-Skolerne (5)	0–7	Næsby (3)
Bramming (5)	5–5 (4–3 p)	Fjordager IF (5)
Holluf Pile Tornbjerg (5)	1–0	Langeskov Idrætsforening (5)
Tarup-Paarup (5)	0–1	Sydvest (3)
Glamsbjerg (5)	2–5	Marienlyst (2)
Toreby-Grænge (5)	1–5	Svebølle (3)
Kalundborg (5)	5–4 (a.e.t.)	Sydalliancen (4)
Dragør (5)	0–3	Boldklubben 1908 (3)
Avedøre (4)	3–2	Fremad Amager (3)
Boldklubben Olympia 1921 (5)	0–6	Hellerup (3)
Fredensborg (4)	0–2	Brønshøj (2)
Nakskov (5)	0–3	Køge (2)
14 August
Hirtshals (5)	0–7	Vendsyssel (2)
Thisted (3)	5–0	Skive (3)
Ringkøbing (3)	0–5	Horsens (2)

Home team	Score	Away team
14 August continued
Kjellerup (4)	1–3	Aarhus Fremad (3)
Djursland (3)	4–3	Skovbakken (3)
Tjørring (5)	5–3	Brabrand (3)
Hedensted (4)	4–3	Middelfart (3)
Grindsted (5)	0–5	Kolding (4)
Varde (4)	1–2	Vejle (2)
Sønderborg (5)	0–1	Svendborg (3)
Haslev (5)	1–4	Næstved (3)
Tuse (5)	1–2	Nordvest (3)
Herlufsholm (5)	0–2	Nykøbing (3)
Skjold (5)	1–4	Roskilde (3)
Vallensbæk (5)	2–0	Søllerød-Vedbæk (3)
Allerød (5)	1–2	Boldklubberne Glostrup Albertslund (4)
Egedal (3)	0–4	Frem (3)
Ballerup-Skovlunde (4)	2–4	Nexø Bornholm (4)
Rishøj (3)	1–3	Hvidovre (2)
Fredriksberg (5)	1–3	Ledøje-Smørum (5)
B.93 (3)	2–1	Herlev (4)
Sunred Beach (5)	1–2	Helsingør (3)
15 August
Udfordringen (5)	1–1 (5–4 p)	Virum-Sorgenfri (4)
20 August
Nørrebro United (5)	0–3	Skjold Birkerød (3)
Aarhus 1900 (5)	1–4	Silkeborg (2)
21 August
Akademisk (2)	0–3	Lyngby (2)

== Second round ==
56 teams were drawn into this round. Matches were played on 27–29 August and 3-4, 10–11 September 2013.

Home team	Score	Away team
27 August
Nexø Bornholm (4)	3–5	Nykøbing (3)
Aalborg Chang (5)	4–3	Aarhus Fremad (3)
Holluf Pile Tornbjerg (5)	0–9	Vejle (2)
Odder (3)	1–4 (a.e.t.)	Sydvest (3)
Ledøje-Smørum (5)	1–3	Køge (2)
Avedøre (4)	0–1	B.93 (3)
Stjernen (5)	1–6	AGF (1)
28 August
Mejrup (5)	1–5	Fredericia (2)
Vallensbæk (5)	0–0 (5–6 p)	Svebølle (3)
Skjold Birkerød (3)	5–0	Marienlyst (2)
Avarta (3)	0–4	Nordvest (3)
Hedensted (4)	3–3 (4–6 p)	Svendborg (3)
Boldklubben 1908 (3)	0–1	SønderjyskE (1)
Kolding (4)	0–5	Hobro (2)
Jammerbugt (3)	0–1	Viborg (1)
Kalundborg (5)	0–9	Vestsjælland (1)

Home team	Score	Away team
28 August continued
Hvidovre (2)	2–1	Brøndby (1)
Hellerup (3)	0–2	Brønshøj (2)
Frem (3)	1–1 (6–7 p)	Næstved (3)
BGA (4)	0–5	Lyngby (2)
Thisted (3)	1–3	Horsens (2)
Roskilde (3)	1–2	Helsingør (3)
29 August
Vendsyssel (2)	3–4 (a.e.t.)	Midtjylland (1)
Silkeborg (2)	0–2	AaB (1)
3 September
Bramming (5)	1–0	Sædding/Guldager (5)
4 September
Viby (4)	3–7 (a.e.t.)	Djursland (3)
10 September
Tjørring (5)	0–7	Næsby (3)
11 September
Udfordringen (5)	1–9	OB (1)

== Third round ==
32 teams were drawn into this round. Matches were played on 24–26 September and 1–2 October 2013.

Home team	Score	Away team
24 September
Køge (2)	1–2	AaB (1)
25 September
Næsby (3)	0–2	Nordsjælland (1)
Djursland (3)	2–4	Midtjylland (1)
Svendborg (3)	0–2	OB (1)
Sydvest (3)	3–1	Bramming (5)
Brønshøj (2)	1–3	AGF (1)
Fredericia (2)	1–1 (4–2 p)	SønderjyskE (1)
Nordvest (3)	3–0	Helsingør (3)
Næstved (3)	3–5 (a.e.t.)	Vejle (2)

Home team	Score	Away team
25 September continued
Nykøbing (3)	0–2	Hobro (2)
Hvidovre (2)	2–4	Copenhagen (1)
26 September
Aalborg Chang (5)	1–7	Esbjerg (1)
Horsens (2)	1–0	Randers (1)
1 October
Skjold Birkerød (3)	1–2	Vestsjælland (1)
2 October
Lyngby (2)	1–0	Viborg (1)
9 October
B.93 (3)	2–1	Svebølle (3)

== Fourth round ==
16 teams were drawn into this round. Matches were played on 29–30 October and 6 November 2013.

29 October 2013	Hobro (2)	1–0 (a.e.t.)	Fredericia (2)	Hobro
19:00	Jensen 117'			Stadium: Hobro Stadion

29 October 2013	Vejle (2)	2–1	Vestsjælland (1)	Vejle
20:00	Gaarde 44'; Hansen 66' (pen.)		Sørensen 81'	Stadium: Vejle Stadion

30 October 2013	Sydvest (3)	1–3	AaB (1)	Løgumkloster
14:00	Ingemann 22'		Petersen 43'; Jacobsen 44'; Frederiksen 52'	Stadium: Klosterhallen

30 October 2013	Nordsjælland (1)	3–1	Midtjylland (1)	Farum
18:15	Thychosen 7'; Aabech 64'; Christiansen 76'		Olsen 39'	Stadium: Farum Park

30 October 2013	Nordvest (3)	0–4	Horsens (2)	Holbæk
19:00			Nworuh 13'; Kielstrup 27'; Mehl 75'; Agger 90'	Stadium: Holbæk Stadion

30 October 2013	Copenhagen (1)	4–3	OB (1)	Indre Østerbro
20:45	Santin 23', 54'; Bengtsson 30'; Pourié 67'		Schoop 9'; Spelmann 18', 52'	Stadium: Parken Stadium

31 October 2013	Lyngby (2)	3–0	Esbjerg (1)	Kongens Lyngby
20:15	Blume 15'; Mortensen 37'; Boysen 87'			Stadium: Lyngby Stadion

6 November 2013	B.93 (3)	0–2	AGF (1)	Copenhagen
19:00			Egbedi 1', 48'	Stadium: Østerbro Stadion

== Quarter-finals ==
18 November 2013	Hobro (2)	1–3	Nordsjælland (1)	Hobro
21:00	Perch-Nielsen 72'		Tičinović 43'; John 56'; Nordstrand 67'	Stadium: Hobro Stadion

4 December 2013	Lyngby (2)	1–2	Copenhagen (1)	Kongens Lyngby
18:00	Mortensen 22'		Kristensen 28' (pen.); Bengtsson 52'	Stadium: Lyngby Stadion

26 February 2014	AGF (1)	1–4	AaB (1)	Aarhus
17:45	Petersen 80'		Thomsen 2'; Olsen 33'; Kusk 67'; Kristensen 71'	Stadium: NRGi Park

15 March 2014	Horsens (2)	5–0	Vejle (2)	Horsens
14:00	Marxen 28'; Bjerregaard 36'; Nworuh 46', 62'; Kryger 90+2'			Stadium: CASA Arena Horsens

== Semi-finals ==
26 March 2014	Copenhagen (1)	1–0	Nordsjælland (1)	Indre Østerbro
20:00	Larsen 27' (o.g.)			Stadium: Parken Stadium

10 April 2014	Nordsjælland (1)	1–1 (1–2 agg.)	Copenhagen (1)	Farum
18:30	Tičinović 5'		Vetokele 59'	Stadium: Farum Park

27 March 2014	Horsens (2)	1–3	AaB (1)	Horsens
20:00	Bjerregaard 46'		Due 2'; Spalvis 65', 78'	Stadium: CASA Arena Horsens

9 April 2014	AaB (1)	2–1 (5–2 agg.)	Horsens (2)	Aalborg
17:45	Kusk 29'; Spalvis 45+1'		Bjerregaard 81'	Stadium: Nordjyske Arena

== Final ==
15 May 2014
20:00 CEST

AaB	4–2	FC Copenhagen
Thelander 41', 44'; Ahlmann 72'; Frederiksen 74'	Report	Cornelius 18'; Gíslason 89'

Parken, Copenhagen
Attendance: 27,380
Referee: Jakob Kehlet
