= Jeppe Curth =

Danish footballer (born 1984)

Personal information
- Full name: Jeppe Lund Curth
- Date of birth: 21 March 1984 (age 42)
- Place of birth: Farum, Denmark
- Height: 1.78 m (5 ft 10 in)
- Position: Forward

Youth career
- Hillerød GI
- ?–2001: Farum
- 2001–2005: Feyenoord

Senior career*
| Years | Team | Apps | (Gls) |
| 2004–2005 | → Excelsior (loan) | 19 | (8) |
| 2005–2014 | AaB | 229 | (52) |
| 2013–2014 | → FC Midtjylland (loan) | 9 | (3) |
| 2014–2017 | Viborg FF | 75 | (18) |
| Total | | 432 | (81) |

International career
| 2000 | Denmark U16 | 3 | (2) |
| 2000–2001 | Denmark U17 | 11 | (1) |
| 2001–2003 | Denmark U19 | 14 | (10) |
| 2002 | Denmark U18 | 1 | (0) |
| 2003 | Denmark U20 | 5 | (0) |
| 2004–2006 | Denmark U21 | 10 | (2) |
- * Club domestic league appearances and goals

Jeppe Lund Curth (born 21 March 1984) is a Danish former professional footballer who played as a forward. He played 43 matches and scored 15 goals for various Danish youth national teams, most recently the Danish national under-21 team.

== Career ==
Curth signed his first youth contract with Danish club Farum BK when he turned 16. He was called up for various Danish youth national teams, debuting for the under-16 squad in March 2000. After several training sessions with Dutch club Feyenoord, he was brought into the youth setup of the club in April 2001. From 2001 to 2003, Curth scored ten goals in 13 games for the Danish under-19 national team, and he was named 2002 Danish Young Player of the Year.

He had a hard time forcing his way into the Feyenoord line-up. He was loaned out to team Excelsior, based in Rotterdam like Feyenoord, for the 2004–05 season, where he made his senior debut and scored eight goals in 19 games. When his contract with Feyenoord expired in July 2005, he returned to Denmark to play for AaB in the Danish Superliga. In his first time with AaB, Curth played both as an attacking midfielder and forward, before settling as the striking partner of Sweden international forward Rade Prica in the 2006–07 Superliga season.

On 10. June 2014, Curth signed with Viborg FF on a free transfer. Curth retired in August 2017.

== Honours ==
AaB

- Danish Superliga: 2008, 2014
- Danish Cup: 2014

Individual

- Danish Young Player of the Year: 2002
- Danish Superliga top goalscorer: 2008
