= Patrick Kristensen =

Danish footballer (born 1987)

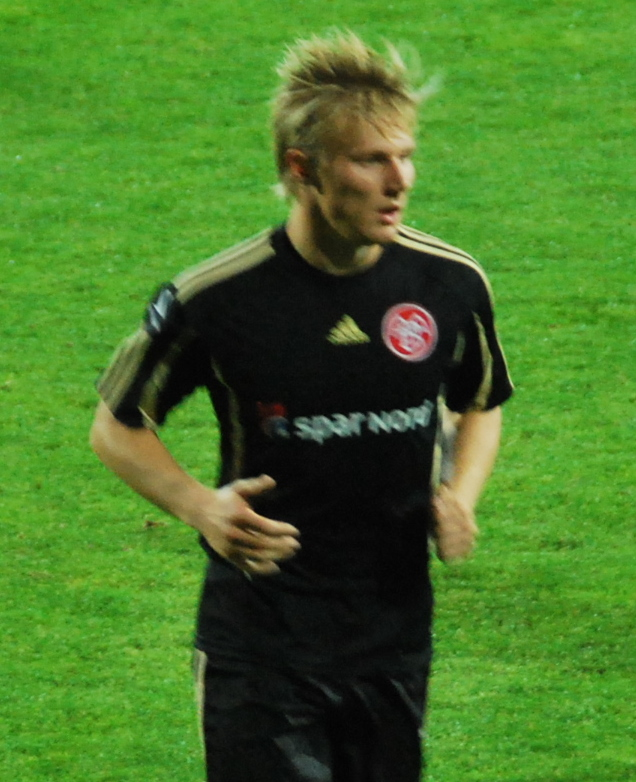

Personal information
- Date of birth: 28 April 1987 (age 39)
- Place of birth: Silkeborg, Denmark
- Height: 1.73 m (5 ft 8 in)
- Positions: Defender; midfielder; forward

Youth career
- Storvorde-Sejlflod Boldklub
- AaB

Senior career*
Years	Team	Apps	(Gls)
2006–2020	AaB	302	(8)

International career
2004	Denmark U17	2	(0)
2005	Denmark U18	1	(1)
2005–2006	Denmark U19	4	(0)
2006	Denmark U20	5	(2)
2007–2008	Denmark U21	6	(0)
- * Club domestic league appearances and goals

Patrick Kristensen (born 28 April 1987) is a Danish former professional footballer who played primarily as a left-back.

== Career ==
On 25 October 2009, Kristensen scored AaB's 1,000th goal in the Danish Superliga, in a match against Brøndby.

On 22 July 2020, Kristensen announced his retirement from professional football. He made 367 official appearances for AaB during his career.

== Honours ==
AaB

- Danish Superliga: 2007–08, 2013–14
- Danish Cup : 2013–14
