= Rasmus Würtz =

Danish footballer (born 1983)

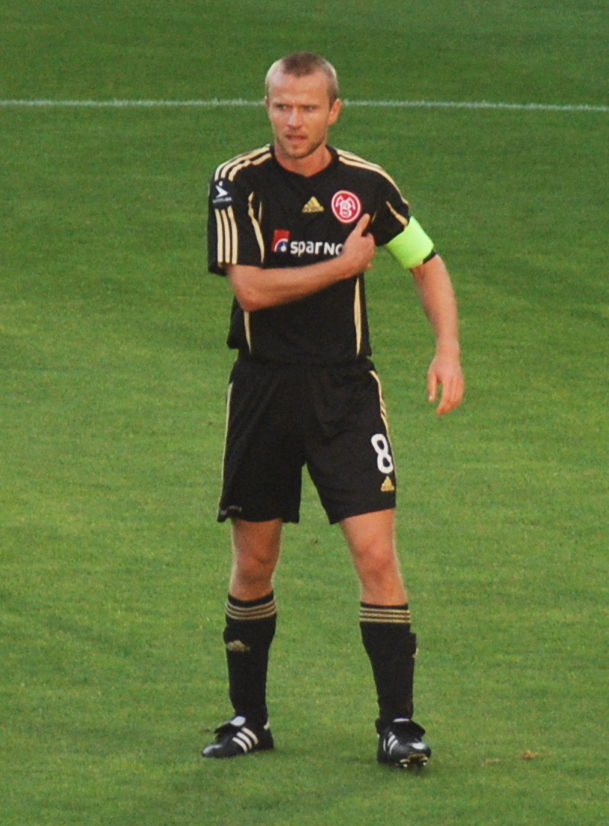
- Würtz in 2011

Personal information
- Full name: Rasmus Østergaard Würtz
- Date of birth: 18 September 1983 (age 43)
- Place of birth: Skive, Denmark
- Height: 1.79 m (5 ft 10 in)
- Position: Midfielder

Senior career*
Years	Team	Apps	(Gls)
2000–2002	Skive	38	(2)
2002–2007	AaB	156	(14)
2007–2009	Copenhagen	18	(0)
2009	→ Vejle (loan)	15	(1)
2009–2019	AaB	263	(5)
Total		490	(22)

International career
2000	Denmark U17	6	(0)
2000–2001	Denmark U19	15	(0)
2004	Denmark U20	2	(0)
2002–2006	Denmark U21	29	(1)
2005–2014	Denmark	12	(0)
2007–2014	Denmark League XI	6	(0)

Managerial career
- 2020–2023: AaB (assistant)
- * Club domestic league appearances and goals

Rasmus Østergaard Würtz (born 18 September 1983) is a Danish former professional footballer who played as a midfielder. He won the 2008–09 Danish Superliga with Copenhagen. He played 12 matches for the Denmark national team from 2005 to 2007, as well as 52 matches for various youth national teams. Würtz was named 2001 Danish Under-19 Player of the Year. He retired after the 2018–19 season. With 452 matches played he is the most capped player in the history of the Danish Superliga.

== Club career ==
Born in Skive, Würtz played his youth years at hometown club of the same name. He made his senior debut for the club in the secondary Danish 1st Division league. In November 2001, he signed a three-and-a-half-year contract with Aalborg Boldspilklub (AaB) in the top-flight Danish Superliga championship. Würtz was subsequently loaned out to Skive for six months, where he finished the 2001–02 season. He joined AaB in July 2002, and instantly became a mainstay in the first team starting line-up. In his debut season in the 2002–03 Danish Superliga season, he missed only one match, as he played 32 of 33 league games. In his first three seasons at AaB, Würtz only missed four of 99 Superliga games.

On 6 July 2007, Würtz moved to league rivals Copenhagen, signing a five-year-long contract with the defending Danish champions. The transfer fee was reported to be around 3 to 4 million Danish kroner (€500,000). In his first time at Copenhagen, Würtz suffered injuries and the lack of playing time caused his form to dip. In February 2009, he was loaned out to Superliga relegation battlers Vejle. He played 15 Superliga games and scored one goal for Vejle, but could not prevent the club from being relegated. As he had played one game for Copenhagen earlier in the season, Würtz had the bitter-sweet experience of both relegation and winning the championship during the 2008–09 Danish Superliga season.

In July 2009, Würtz was transferred back to AaB, signing a four-year-long contract with his old club, as his Copenhagen career did not seem to improve.

In December 2012, he signed a three-year extension with AaB.

== International career ==
While playing for Skive, Würtz represented Denmark in various youth national teams, and competed at the 2000 Under-17 European Championship. Würtz was a part of the Danish squad for the 2001 European Under-18 Championship, where he was one of Denmark's best players. In the spring 2002, he was named 2001 Danish Under-19 Player of the Year.

Würtz made his debut for the Denmark under-21 national team in August 2002. He played 17 under-21 national team matches until February 2005, taking over for Jan Kristiansen as team captain in September 2004. He debuted for the senior Danish national team on 2 June 2005, in a 1–0 friendly match win against Finland. He came on the pitch as a substitute for Danish team captain Jon Dahl Tomasson, and was supposed to hand over the captain's armband to Thomas Gravesen who had a bold head. When he approached Gravesen, he was told to take the armband himself and thus he captained the Danish national team for the final nine minutes of his debut game.

Having received his senior debut for Denmark, Würtz captained the Danish under-21 national team, as it qualified for the 2006 European Under-21 Championship in May 2006. He was the Danish under-21 team captain at the tournament, playing full-time in Denmark's three matches, and scored a goal against the Italian u-21s. Following Denmark's exit from the tournament, he ended his under-21 national team career due to age restrictions, having played 29 under-21 national team matches in all. He was nominated for the Danish league national team squad, a selection of the best Danish Superliga players, to tour U.S., El Salvador and Honduras in January 2007. He was named team captain, and started in all three games of the tour.

Würtz played eight and ninth national team games in his first months at F.C. Copenhagen, before he was dropped from international selection. After his return to AaB, he was once more in the periphery of the national team. He was called up for the Danish league national football team, and played three games for the team in January 2010.

== Honours ==
AaB

- Danish Superliga: 2013–14
- Danish Cup: 2013–14; runner-up 2003–04

Individual

- Danish Under-19 Player of the Year: 2001
- Danish Goal of the Year: 2010
