= Kasper Kusk =

Danish footballer (born 1991)

Personal information
- Full name: Kasper Kusk Vangsgaard
- Date of birth: 10 November 1991 (age 34)
- Place of birth: Aalborg, Denmark
- Height: 1.80 m (5 ft 11 in)
- Position: Winger

Team information
- Current team: Vendsyssel
- Number: 17

Youth career
- –2005: Gug BK
- 2005–2010: AaB

Senior career*
Years	Team	Apps	(Gls)
2010–2014	AaB	80	(21)
2014–2015	Twente	10	(0)
2014–2015	→ Jong Twente	14	(3)
2015–2018	Copenhagen	67	(13)
2018–2022	AaB	146	(22)
2022–2024	Silkeborg	46	(2)
2024–2026	Vendsyssel	52	(9)
Total		415	(70)

International career
2010	Denmark U20	3	(0)
2012	Denmark U21	6	(0)
2013–2016	Denmark	8	(0)
- * Club domestic league appearances and goals

Kasper Kusk Vangsgaard (Danish pronunciation: [ˈkʰusk]; born 10 November 1991) is a former Danish professional footballer who played as a winger.

He is the son of former AaB manager and player Søren Kusk.

After the 2025-26-season Kusk announced his retirement.

== Career ==
=== AaB ===
Having spent the earliest part of his career at local club Gug Boldklub he moved to AaB at the age of 14.

He made his first team league debut for AaB in a 2–0 home loss against Esbjerg fB on 21 August 2010, coming on as a substitute in the 80th minute. His breakthrough into the AaB starting eleven came in the spring of 2012, where he made 11 appearances and scoring 1 goal.

His good form in the 2012–13 season was rewarded with an extension of his contract, a call-up to the Danish national team and interest from European clubs, including Crystal Palace, Anderlecht and Lille.

He was voted as the league profile of the fall 2013 in the Danish Superliga by the league's managers.

in May 2014, Kusk and AaB won the Danish Superliga and the Danish Cup. Kusk scored 12 goals and created 8 assists in the league.

=== Twente ===
On 10 June 2014, it was confirmed by the president of FC Twente, Joop Munsterman, that the club was discussing a transfer of Kusk.

=== Copenhagen ===
On 14 May 2015, it was confirmed that Kusk returned to the Danish Superliga, as he signed a five-year contract with F.C. Copenhagen.

=== Return to AaB ===
On 31 January 2018, Kusk returned to AaB.

=== Silkeborg ===
On 31 August 2022, Kusk joined Silkeborg IF on a deal until June 2024.

=== Vendsyssel FF ===
On 10 April 2024, it was announced that Kusk would join Vendsyssel FF from the upcoming season.

== Honours ==
AaB

- Danish Superliga: 2013–14
- Danish Cup: 2013–14

Copenhagen

- Danish Superliga: 2015–16, 2016–17
- Danish Cup: 2015–16, 2016–17

Silkeborg

- Danish Cup: 2023–24
