= 2008–09 AaB Fodbold season =

AaB Fodbold
2008–09 season
- Manager: Bruce Rioch (from July 1 to October 23); Allan Kuhn (interim manager); Magnus Pehrsson (from January 1)
- Stadium: Energi Nord Arena
- Danish Superliga: 7th
- Danish Cup: Runners-up
- Champions League: Group stage
- UEFA Cup: Round of 16
- Top goalscorer: Cacá (8)

During the 2008–09 Danish football season, AaB Fodbold competed in the Danish Superliga.

== Season summary ==
Bruce Rioch managed to guide AaB to the Champions League group stage, but was sacked after only two wins from the first 10 league games and a single point won from their first three Champions League games, with the team 11th in the Superliga. Interim manager Allan Kuhn went undefeated in his seven league games and three Champions League games, seeing the club rise to 6th and qualify for the UEFA Cup knockout stages. However, sporting director Lynge Jakobsen was wary of promoting Kuhn from assistant coach to head coach and instead opted to appoint Magnus Pehrsson as permanent head coach. Although Pehrsson only won 3 of his 16 league matches in charge, resulting in a final 7th-place finish (their lowest in 11 years), he achieved famous victories against Deportivo and Manchester City to take AaB to the round of 16 before elimination at the hands of the Mancunian team on penalties. He also took the team to the Danish Cup final; although they were defeated by F.C. Copenhagen, Copenhagen's title victory saw AaB qualify for the second qualifying round of the inaugural season of the UEFA Europa League.

== First-team squad ==
Squad at end of season

Note: Flags indicate national team as defined under FIFA eligibility rules; some limited exceptions apply. Players may hold more than one non-FIFA nationality.

No.	Pos.	Nation	Player
1	GK	MAR	Karim Zaza (Note: Zaza was born in Brøndby, Denmark, but also qualified to represent Morocco internationally and made his international debut for Morocco in 2000.)
2	DF	DEN	Michael Jakobsen
4	DF	AUS	Michael Beauchamp
5	DF	NOR	Kjetil Wæhler
6	DF	NED	Steve Olfers
7	MF	DEN	Anders Due
8	MF	SWE	Andreas Johansson
9	MF	DEN	Thomas Augustinussen
11	FW	JAM	Luton Shelton (on loan from Vålerenga)
14	FW	DEN	Jeppe Curth
15	FW	RSA	Siyabonga Nomvethe
16	DF	DEN	Kasper Bøgelund
18	MF	BRA	Cacá

No.	Pos.	Nation	Player
19	FW	USA	Marcus Tracy
20	MF	DEN	Henrik Dalsgaard
21	MF	DEN	Kasper Risgård
23	MF	DEN	Thomas Enevoldsen
24	DF	DEN	Jens-Kristian Sørensen
27	MF	DEN	Patrick Kristensen
28	DF	DEN	Emil Haucke
30	GK	DEN	Kenneth Stenild
31	DF	DEN	Lasse Nielsen
32	FW	DEN	Ronnie Schwartz
36	DF	DEN	Daniel Christensen
37	GK	DEN	Simon Sloth

=== Left club during season ===
Note: Flags indicate national team as defined under FIFA eligibility rules; some limited exceptions apply. Players may hold more than one non-FIFA nationality.

No.	Pos.	Nation	Player
3	DF	DEN	Martin Pedersen (to Vejle Boldklub)
10	FW	POL	Marek Saganowski (on loan from Southampton)
17	MF	RSA	Benedict Vilakazi (to Mamelodi Sundowns)

No.	Pos.	Nation	Player
20	FW	DEN	Simon Bræmer (to Akademisk Boldklub)
25	DF	DEN	Casper Nordstrøm (to Thisted FC)
26	FW	DEN	Jacob Nordstrøm (released)

== Results ==
=== UEFA Champions League ===
==== Second qualifying round ====
30 July 2008	Aalborg BK (Denmark)	5–0	(Bosnia and Herzegovina) Modriča	Energi Nord Arena, Aalborg
20:00 CET	Johansson 16'; Jakobsen 42'; Bræmer 44'; Due 53'; Cacá 89'	Report		Attendance: 6,043; Referee: Stanislav Sukhina (Russia)

6 August 2008	Modriča (Bosnia and Herzegovina)	1–2	(Denmark) Aalborg BK	Bilino Polje, Zenica
20:00 CET	Bojić 72'	Report	Due 12'; Risgård 62'	Attendance: 270; Referee: Thorsten Kinhöfer (Germany)

Aalborg BK won 7–1 on aggregate.

==== Third qualifying round ====
13 August 2008	Aalborg BK (Denmark)	2–0	(Lithuania) Kaunas	Energi Nord Arena, Aalborg
20:05 CET	Cacá 71'; Curth 86'	Report		Attendance: 6,310; Referee: Ivan Bebek (Croatia)

27 August 2008	Kaunas (Lithuania)	0–2	(Denmark) Aalborg BK	S. Darius and S. Girėnas Stadium, Kaunas
19:00 CET		Report	Risgård 75', 90+1'	Attendance: 3,000; Referee: Pedro Proença (Portugal)

Aalborg BK won 4–0 on aggregate.

==== Group stage ====
17 September 2008	Celtic (Scotland)	0–0	(Denmark) Aalborg BK	Celtic Park, Glasgow
20:45		Report		Attendance: 58,754; Referee: Matteo Trefoloni (Italy)

30 September 2008	Aalborg BK (Denmark)	0–3	(England) Manchester United	Aalborg Stadion, Aalborg
20:45		Report	Rooney 22'; Berbatov 55', 79'	Attendance: 10,346; Referee: Olegário Benquerença (Portugal)

21 October 2008	Villarreal (Spain)	6–3	(Denmark) Aalborg BK	Estadio El Madrigal, Villarreal
20:45	Rossi 28'; Capdevila 33'; Llorente 67', 70', 84'; Pires 79'	Report	Saganowski 19'; Enevoldsen 36'; Johansson 77'	Attendance: 15,959; Referee: Florian Meyer (Germany)

5 November 2008	Aalborg BK (Denmark)	2–2	(Spain) Villarreal	Aalborg Stadion, Aalborg
20:45	Curth 54'; Due 81'	Report	Rossi 41'; Franco 75'	Attendance: 10,355; Referee: Bertrand Layec (France)

25 November 2008	Aalborg BK (Denmark)	2–1	(Scotland) Celtic	Aalborg Stadion, Aalborg
20:45	Cacá 73'; Caldwell 87' (o.g.)	Report	Robson 53'	Attendance: 10,096; Referee: Konrad Plautz (Austria)

10 December 2008	Manchester United (England)	2–2	(Denmark) Aalborg BK	Old Trafford, Manchester
20:45	Tevez 3'; Rooney 52'	Report	Jakobsen 31'; Curth 45+2'	Attendance: 74,382; Referee: Laurent Duhamel (France)

=== UEFA Cup ===
==== Round of 32 ====
18 February 2009	Aalborg BK (Denmark)	3–0	(Spain) Deportivo La Coruña	Energi Nord Arena, Aalborg
21:00	Due 53', 71'; Jakobsen 90' (pen.)	Report		Attendance: 7,987; Referee: Nikolai Ivanov (Russia)

26 February 2009	Deportivo La Coruña (Spain)	1–3	(Denmark) Aalborg BK	Estadio Riazor, A Coruña
21:00	Sergio 38'	Report	Shelton 41'; Johansson 45'; Enevoldsen 45+1'	Attendance: 16,000; Referee: Alan Kelly (Ireland)

Aalborg BK won 6–1 on aggregate.

==== Round of 16 ====
12 March 2009	Manchester City (England)	2–0	(Denmark) Aalborg BK	City of Manchester Stadium, Manchester
20:45	Caicedo 8'; Wright-Phillips 30'	Report		Attendance: 24,502; Referee: Alain Hamer (Luxembourg)

19 March 2009	Aalborg BK (Denmark)	2–0 (a.e.t.) (3–4 p)	(England) Manchester City	Energi Nord Arena, Aalborg
21:00	Shelton 85'; Jakobsen 90+1' (pen.)	Report		Attendance: 10,734; Referee: Stéphane Lannoy (France)
	Penalties
	Jakobsen (penalty scored); Johansson (penalty scored); Augustinussen (penalty missed); Nomvethe (penalty scored); Shelton (penalty missed)		(penalty scored) Evans; (penalty scored) Elano; (penalty scored) Wright-Phillips; (penalty scored) Dunne

Manchester City 2–2 Aalborg BK on aggregate. Manchester City won 4–3 on penalties.
