= 2011–12 AaB Fodbold season =

AaB
2011–12 season
- Sports Director: Lynge Jakobsen
- Head Coach: Kent Nielsen
- Stadium: Nordjyske Arena
- Danish Superliga: 7th
- Danish Cup: Second round
- Top goalscorer: League: Nicklas Helenius (14); All: Nicklas Helenius (15)
- Highest home attendance: 9,737 vs AGF (24 July 2011, Danish Superliga)
- Lowest home attendance: 4,587 vs Silkeborg IF (8 April 2012, Danish Superliga)
- Average home league attendance: 7,381
Home colours	Away colours

The 2011-12 season is AaB's 29th consecutive season in the top flight of Danish football, 22nd consecutive season in the Danish Superliga, and 126th year in existence as a football club.

== Club ==
=== Coaching staff ===
Position	Staff
Head Coach	(Denmark) Kent Nielsen
Assistant coach	(Denmark) Allan Kuhn
Development Manager - AaB Fodbold	(Denmark) Poul Erik Andreasen
Goalkeeping coach	(Denmark) Poul Buus
Team Leader	(Denmark) Ernst Damborg
Doctor	(Denmark) Søren Kaalund
Physiotherapist	(Denmark) Morten Skjoldager
Physical trainer	(England) Ashley Tootle
Sports Psychology consultant	(Denmark) Martin Langagergaard
U/19 League coach	(Denmark) Jacob Friis
U/17 League coach	(Denmark) Lars Knudsen

Source: AaB Fodbold

=== Other information ===
Owner	(Denmark) AaB A/S
Chief Executive	(Denmark) Lynge Jakobsen
Sports Director	(Denmark) Lynge Jakobsen
Ground (capacity and dimensions)	Nordjyske Arena (13,800 / 105x70 metres)
Training ground	AaB Training Centre

Source: AaB Fodbold

== Transfers and loans ==
=== In ===
==== Summer ====
Squad #	Position	Player	Transferred from	Fee	Date	Source
22	GK	(Denmark) Carsten Christensen	(Denmark) FC Fredericia	Free transfer	14 July 2011	
21	CB	(Denmark) Nicholas Gotfredsen	(Denmark) Aarhus Fremad	Free transfer	14 July 2011	
15	LB	(Argentina) Luis Rodríguez	(Moldova) Sheriff Tiraspol	Free transfer	19 July 2011	
30	ST	(Brazil) Kayke	(Brazil) Vila Nova	Free transfer	1 September 2011	

=== Out ===
==== Summer ====
Squad #	Position	Player	Transferred To	Fee	Date	Source
		(Denmark) Dennis Marshall	Died		24 June 2011	
	GK	(Morocco) Karim Zaza	(Denmark) FC Hjørring	Free transfer	30 June 2011	
	LW	(Cameroon) Ibekwe Chijioke Leonard	(Thailand) Buriram United F.C.	Free transfer	30 June 2011	
	CB	(Denmark) Michael Sten Jensen	(United States) Ventura County Fusion	Free transfer	30 June 2011	
	LB	(Denmark) Marc Pedersen	(Denmark) Jammerbugt FC	Free transfer	30 June 2011	
	LW	(Denmark) Daniel Christensen	(Denmark) SønderjyskE	Free transfer	30 June 2011	
	ST	(Denmark) Ronnie Schwartz	(Denmark) Randers FC	Free transfer	30 July 2011	
	CB	(Denmark) Jens-Kristian Sørensen	(Denmark) Viborg FF	Undisclosed	1 August 2011	
