= 2013–14 AaB Fodbold season =

AaB
2013–14 season
- Sports Director: Allan Gaarde
- Head Coach: Kent Nielsen
- Stadium: Nordjyske Arena
- Danish Superliga: Champions
- Danish Cup: Winners
- UEFA Europa League: Second qualifying round
- Top goalscorer: League: Kasper Kusk (12); All: Kasper Kusk (17)
- Highest home attendance: 13,139 vs Brøndby (13 April 2014, Danish Superliga)
- Lowest home attendance: 5,283 vs AC Horsens (9 April 2014, Danish Cup)
- Average home league attendance: 8,475
Home colours	Away colours

The 2013–14 season is AaB's 31st consecutive season in the top flight of Danish football, 24th consecutive season in the Danish Superliga, and the 128th year as a football club. AaB will participate in the Europa League this season, coming in 5th place in the 2012–13 Danish Superliga. The club had the most successful season in its history, winning the Danish Superliga for a fourth time and the Danish Cup for a third time, therefore becoming the fifth Danish club to complete the "Double".

== Month by Month review ==
Month	G	W	D	L	GF	GA	GD	GFA	GAA	Pts per G	Max Pts	Pts	Pts Diff	DSL Rnk
July	2	2	0	0	4	2	+2	2	1	3	6	6	0	2
August	4	0	2	2	3	5	-2	0.75	1.25	0.5	12	2	10	7
September	4	2	1	1	7	5	+2	1.75	1.25	1.75	12	7	5	4
October	3	2	0	1	5	4	+1	1.67	1.33	2	9	6	3	2
November	3	2	1	0	6	2	+4	2	0.67	2.33	9	7	2	2
December	2	1	1	0	7	2	+5	3.5	1	2	6	4	2	2
February	1	0	1	0	2	2	0	2	2	1	3	1	2	2
March	5	3	1	1	10	6	+4	2	1.2	2	15	10	5	2
April	5	4	0	1	11	5	+6	2.2	1	2.4	15	12	3	1
May	4	2	1	1	5	4	+1	1.25	1	1.75	12	7	5	1
Total	33	18	8	7	60	38	+22	1.82	1.15	1.88	99	62	37	1

== Club ==
=== Coaching staff ===
Position	Staff
Head Coach	(Denmark) Kent Nielsen
Assistant coach	(Denmark) Allan Kuhn
Development Manager – AaB Fodbold	(Denmark) Poul Erik Andreasen
Goalkeeping coach	(Denmark) Poul Buus
Team Leader	(Denmark) Ernst Damborg
Doctor	(Denmark) Søren Kaalund
Physiotherapist	(Denmark) Morten Skjoldager
Physical trainer	(England) Ashley Tootle
Sports Psychology consultant	(Denmark) Martin Langagergaard
U/19 League coach	(Denmark) Jacob Friis
U/17 League coach	(Denmark) Lars Knudsen

Source: AaB Fodbold

=== Other information ===
Owner	(Denmark) AaB A/S
Chief Executive	(Denmark) Stephan Schors
Sports Director	(Denmark) Allan Gaarde
Sales Manager	(Denmark) Preben Hansen
Press and Communications	(Denmark) Brian Andersen
Conference Sales Manager	(Denmark) Birgitte Cassebaum Nielsen
Ground (capacity and dimensions)	Nordjyske Arena (13,800 / 105x70 metres)
Training ground	AaB Training Centre

Source: AaB Fodbold

== First team squad ==
As of 18 May 2014

Squad No.	Name	Nationality	Position(s)	Since	Date of birth (age)	Signed from	Games played	Goals scored
Goalkeepers
1	Nicolai Larsen	(Denmark)	GK	2010	9 March 1991 (age 35)	(Denmark) Lyngby Boldklub	107	0
22	Carsten Christensen	(Denmark)	GK	2011	28 August 1986 (age 39)	(Denmark) FC Fredericia	3	0
Defenders
3	Jakob Ahlmann	(Denmark)	LB / LWB	2009	18 January 1991 (age 35)	(Denmark) Midtjylland	85	3
5	Kenneth Emil Petersen	(Denmark)	CB	2009	15 January 1985 (age 41)	(Denmark) AC Horsens	130	9
20	Henrik Dalsgaard	(Denmark)	RB / RWB / RM / RW	2009	27 July 1989 (age 36)	(Denmark) Møldrup/Tostrup	137	9
26	Rasmus Thelander	(Denmark)	CB	2012	7 September 1991 (age 34)	(Denmark) AB	44	4
31	Jakob Blåbjerg	(Denmark)	CB / LB	2013	11 January 1995 (age 31)	(Denmark) AaB Academy	1	0
32	Kasper Pedersen	(Denmark)	CB / RB	2013	13 January 1993 (age 33)	(Denmark) AaB Academy	9	2
Midfielders
2	Patrick Kristensen	(Denmark)	LB / RB / CM / RM / RW	2006	28 April 1987 (age 39)	(Denmark) AaB Academy	229	9
7	Anders Due	(Denmark)	CM / LM / RM / LW	2008	17 March 1982 (age 44)	(Netherlands) Vitesse Arnhem	189	19
8	Rasmus Würtz (VC)	(Denmark)	CM / DM	2009	18 September 1983 (age 42)	(Denmark) Copenhagen	344	19
9	Thomas Augustinussen (C)	(Denmark)	CM / DM	2011	20 March 1981 (age 45)	(Austria) Red Bull Salzburg	377	43
14	Mathias Wichmann	(Denmark)	CM / AM / LM / RM	2009	6 August 1991 (age 34)	(Denmark) AaB Academy	110	4
15	Gilli Sørensen	(Faroe Islands)	LM / LW	2014	8 November 1992 (age 33)	(Faroe Islands) B36 Tórshavn	1	0
17	Kasper Kusk	(Denmark)	CM / AM / LM / RM / LW / RW	2010	10 November 1991 (age 34)	(Denmark) AaB Academy	89	26
21	Kasper Risgård	(Denmark)	CM / DM	2013	4 January 1983 (age 43)	(Denmark) Silkeborg IF	188	27
23	Nicolaj Thomsen	(Denmark)	CM / AM / LM / LW	2011	8 May 1993 (age 33)	(Denmark) AaB Academy	68	5
27	Christian Rye	(Denmark)	CM / DM	2013	15 February 1994 (age 32)	(Denmark) AaB Academy	0	0
30	Andreas Bruhn	(Denmark)	CM / AM / LM / LW	2013	17 February 1994 (age 32)	(Denmark) AaB Academy	6	0
Forwards
10	Jeppe Curth	(Denmark)	CM / AM / CF	2005	21 March 1984 (age 42)	(Netherlands) Feyenoord	283	65
11	Rasmus Jönsson	(Sweden)	CF / RW	2013	27 January 1990 (age 36)	(Germany) VfL Wolfsburg	20	6
18	Anders K. Jacobsen	(Denmark)	CF	2013	27 October 1989 (age 36)	(Denmark) FC Fredericia	29	8
19	Søren Frederiksen	(Denmark)	CF / LW	2013	8 July 1989 (age 36)	(Denmark) Copenhagen	40	6
29	Rolf Toft	(Denmark)	CF	2011	4 August 1992 (age 33)	(Denmark) AaB Academy	25	1
33	Lukas Spalvis	(Lithuania)	CF	2013	27 July 1994 (age 31)	(Denmark) AaB Academy	24	11

Source: AaB Fodbold website

== Transfers and loans ==
=== In ===
==== Summer ====
Squad #	Position	Player	Transferred from	Fee	Date	Source
21	CM	(Denmark) Kasper Risgård	(Denmark) Silkeborg IF	Free transfer	19 July 2013	
18	ST	(Denmark) Anders K. Jacobsen	(Denmark) FC Fredericia	£0.09 million	30 July 2013	

==== Winter ====
Squad #	Position	Player	Transferred from	Fee	Date	Source
15	LW	(Faroe Islands) Gilli Sørensen	(Faroe Islands) B36 Tórshavn	Undisclosed	1 January 2014	

=== Out ===
==== Summer ====
Squad #	Position	Player	Transferred To	Fee	Date	Source
11	ST	(Denmark) Nicklas Helenius	(England) Aston Villa	£1.28 million	18 June 2013	
30	ST	(Brazil) Kayke	(Brazil) Paraná	Free transfer	30 June 2013	

==== Winter ====
Squad #	Position	Player	Transferred To	Fee	Date	Source
4	CB	(Denmark) Lasse Nielsen	(Netherlands) NEC	£0.3 million	30 January 2014	
28	CM	(Faroe Islands) Hallur Hansson	(Faroe Islands) Víkingur	Free transfer	31 January 2014	

=== Loan in ===
Squad #	Position	Player	Loaned From	Start	End	Source
11	ST	(Sweden) Rasmus Jönsson	(Germany) VfL Wolfsburg	9 August 2013	30 June 2014	

=== Loan out ===
Squad #	Position	Player	Loaned To	Start	End	Source
29	ST	(Denmark) Rolf Toft	(Denmark) Vejle BK	21 August 2013	1 February 2014	
10	ST	(Denmark) Jeppe Curth	(Denmark) Midtjylland	2 September 2013	31 December 2013	

=== Overall transfer activity ===
==== Spending ====
Summer: ▼£90,000

Winter: £0

Total: ▼£90,000

==== Income ====
Summer: ▲£1,280,000

Winter: ▲£300,000

Total: ▲£1,580,000

==== Expenditure ====
Summer: ▲£1,190,000

Winter: ▲£300,000

Total: ▲£1,490,000

== Friendlies ==
=== Pre-season ===
20 June 2013 Friendly	IK Aalborg Freja (Denmark)	1 – 5	(Denmark) AaB	Aalborg, Denmark
18:00 CEST	Rømer 15'	Report	Toft 21'; Curth 39'; Frederiksen 50', 67', 70'	Stadium: Frejaparken

5 July 2013 Friendly	SSVg Velbert (Germany)	0 – 2	(Denmark) AaB	Velbert, Germany
18:30 CEST		Report	Spalvis 67', 78'	Stadium: Christopeit Sport Arena

7 July 2013 Friendly	Eintracht Braunschweig (Germany)	0 – 0	(Denmark) AaB	Salzgitter, Germany
15:00 CEST		Report		Stadium: Stadion am Salzgittersee; Attendance: 3,084

12 July 2013 Friendly	Silkeborg IF (Denmark)	0 – 1	(Denmark) AaB	Silkeborg, Denmark
13:00 CEST		Report	Frederiksen 46'	Stadium: Mascot Park

=== Mid-season ===
24 January 2014 Friendly	AaB (Denmark)	2 – 0	(Denmark) AC Horsens	Aalborg, Denmark
14:00 CET	Sørensen 12'; Spalvis 45'	Report		Stadium: Frejaparken

26 January 2014 Friendly	AaB (Denmark)	2 – 0	(Denmark) Vejle BK	Aalborg, Denmark
13:30 CET	Jönsson 17'; Spalvis 34'	Report		Stadium: Frejaparken

31 January 2014 Friendly	Viborg (Denmark)	0 – 2^{(3 x 45 minutes match)}	(Denmark) AaB	Bjerringbro, Denmark
12:00 CET		Report	Jacobsen 48'; Augustinussen 132'	Stadium: Bjerringbro Idrætspark

12 February 2014 Friendly	Benfica / Benfica B (Portugal)	1 – 1^{(45 + 60 minutes match)}	(Denmark) AaB	Lisbon, Portugal
11:00 WET	Sulejmani 4'	Report	Kusk 1'	Stadium: Caixa Futebol Campus

15 February 2014 Friendly	IFK Göteborg (Sweden)	1 – 3	(Denmark) AaB	Gothenburg, Sweden
13:05 CET	Augustinsson 61'	Report	Kusk 36'; Spalvis 44', 48'	Stadium: Valhalla IP; Attendance: 2,409; Referee: Bojan Pandžić (Sweden)

=== Post-season ===
22 May 2013 Friendly	Han Herred Xl (Denmark)	1 – 9	(Denmark) AaB	Fjerritslev, Denmark
18:00 CEST	Bilgram 37'	Report	Wichmann 2'; Jacobsen 14', 17', 45'; Frederiksen 22', 30'; Sørensen 35', 49'; Ahlmann 53'	Stadium: Fjerritslev Stadion; Attendance: 1,076

== Competitions ==
=== Competition record ===
Competition	Record							
Competition	G	W	D	L	GF	GA	GD	Win %
Danish Superliga	33	18	8	7	60	38	+22	54.55
Danish Cup	7	7	0	0	20	7	+13	100.00
Europa League	2	0	1	1	0	3	−3	0.00
Total	42	25	9	8	80	48	+32	59.52

=== Danish Superliga ===
==== League table ====
Pos	Team	Pld	W	D	L	GF	GA	GD	Pts	Qualification or relegation
1	AaB (C)	33	18	8	7	60	38	+22	62	Qualification for the Champions League third qualifying round
2	Copenhagen	33	15	11	7	54	38	+16	56	Qualification for the Champions League third qualifying round
3	Midtjylland	33	16	7	10	61	38	+23	55	Qualification for the Europa League play-off round
4	Brøndby	33	13	13	7	47	38	+9	52	Qualification for the Europa League third qualifying round
5	Esbjerg fB	33	13	9	11	47	38	+9	48	Qualification for the Europa League second qualifying round

Source: Danish Football Association (in Danish)
Rules for classification: 1) points; 2) goal difference; 3) number of goals scored.
(C) Champions

==== Results summary ====
Overall								Home						Away					
Pld	W	D	L	GF	GA	GD	Pts	W	D	L	GF	GA	GD	W	D	L	GF	GA	GD
33	18	8	7	60	38	+22	62	10	5	2	24	10	+14	8	3	5	36	28	+8

Last updated: 18 May 2014.
Source: Competitive matches

==== Results by round ====
Round	1	2	3	4	5	6	7	8	9	10	11	12	13	14	15	16	17	18	19	20	21	22	23	24	25	26	27	28	29	30	31	32	33
Ground	H	A	A	H	A	H	H	A	A	H	H	A	H	H	A	H	A	H	A	H	A	H	A	H	A	H	A	H	A	H	A	A	H
Result	W	W	L	D	L	D	W	W	L	D	W	L	W	W	W	D	D	W	D	D	W	W	L	W	W	W	W	L	W	L	W	D	W
Position	3	2	3	3	5	7	3	2	3	4	2	2	2	2	2	2	2	2	2	2	2	2	2	2	1	1	1	1	1	2	1	1	1

Updated to match(es) played on 18 May 2014. Source: superstats.dk
A = Away; H = Home; W = Win; D = Draw; L = Loss

==== Matches ====
21 July 2013 1	AaB	2 – 1	Copenhagen	Aalborg
19:00 CEST	Curth 46'; Frederiksen 70'	Report	Bengtsson 48'	Stadium: Nordjyske Arena; Attendance: 7,062; Referee: Michael Tykgaard

29 July 2013 2	Esbjerg	1 – 2	AaB	Esbjerg
19:00 CEST	Lyng 20'	Report	Risgård 52'; Ankersen 61' (o.g.)	Stadium: Blue Water Arena; Attendance: 9,517; Referee: Henning Jensen

5 August 2013 3	Vestsjælland	2 – 1	AaB	Slagelse
19:00 CEST	Bozga 8'; Sørensen 68'	Report	Lund 90+4' (o.g.)	Stadium: Harboe Arena Slagelse; Attendance: 4,688; Referee: Kenn Hansen

11 August 2013 4	AaB	0 – 0	OB	Aalborg
17:00 CEST		Report		Stadium: Nordjyske Arena; Attendance: 6,664; Referee: Mads-Kristoffer Kristoffersen

17 August 2013 5	Nordsjælland	2 – 1	AaB	Farum
17:00 CEST	Nordstrand 14', 71'	Report	Kusk 29'	Stadium: Farum Park; Attendance: 4,013; Referee: Jakob Kehlet

26 August 2013 6	AaB	1 – 1	Midtjylland	Aalborg
19:00 CEST	Jacobsen 2'	Report	Nielsen 56' (o.g.)	Stadium: Nordjyske Arena; Attendance: 7,392; Referee: Peter Kjærsgaard-Andersen

1 September 2013 7	AaB	2 – 1	Brøndby	Aalborg
19:00 CEST	Dalsgaard 83'; Jacobsen 86'	Report	Makienok 72'	Stadium: Nordjyske Arena; Attendance: 8,566; Referee: Mads-Kristoffer Kristoffersen

13 September 2013 8	SønderjyskE	1 – 3	AaB	Haderslev
18:30 CEST	Christensen 43'	Report	Jacobsen 29'; Würtz 90+1'; Risgård 90+3'	Stadium: Haderslev Fodboldstadion; Attendance: 3,123; Referee: Dennis Mogensen

20 September 2013 9	Randers	3 – 2	AaB	Randers
18:30 CEST	Lundberg 27'; Kristensen 38' (o.g.); Kamper 74'	Report	Kusk 9'; Jönsson 69'	Stadium: AutoC Park Randers; Attendance: 5,690; Referee: Jens Maae

29 September 2013 10	AaB	0 – 0	AGF	Aalborg
17:00 CEST		Report		Stadium: Nordjyske Arena; Attendance: 7,447; Referee: Michael Johansen

6 October 2013 11	AaB	3 – 1	Viborg	Aalborg
15:00 CEST	Kusk 18' (pen.); Jönsson 41', 59'	Report	Dalgaard 23'	Stadium: Nordjyske Arena; Attendance: 6,872; Referee: Jakob Kehlet

20 October 2013 12	Copenhagen	3 – 0	AaB	Copenhagen
19:00 CEST	Jørgensen 43'; Nielsen 62' (o.g.); Vetokele 89'	Report		Stadium: Parken; Attendance: 13,693; Referee: Michael Tykgaard

27 October 2013 13	AaB	2 – 0	SønderjyskE	Aalborg
14:00 CET	Jónasson 69' (o.g.); Kusk 73' (pen.)	Report		Stadium: Nordjyske Arena; Attendance: 5,469; Referee: Mads-Kristoffer Kristoffersen

2 November 2013 14	AaB	1 – 0	OB	Aalborg
17:00 CET	Høegh 49' (o.g.)	Report		Stadium: Nordjyske Arena; Attendance: 5,289; Referee: Anders Poulsen

11 November 2013 15	Randers	1 – 4	AaB	Randers
19:00 CET	Svensson 72'	Report	Kusk 7' (pen.), 19', 48'; Thomsen 89'	Stadium: AutoC Park Randers; Attendance: 5,624; Referee: Lars Christoffersen

25 November 2013 16	AaB	1 – 1	Nordsjælland	Aalborg
19:00 CET	Jacobsen 21'	Report	Vingaard 35'	Stadium: Nordjyske Arena; Attendance: 5,551; Referee: Mads-Kristoffer Kristoffersen

2 December 2013 17	Esbjerg	2 – 2	AaB	Esbjerg
19:00 CET	van Buren 34'; Lyng 53'	Report	Drobo-Ampem 5' (o.g.); Kusk 29'	Stadium: Blue Water Arena; Attendance: 5,013; Referee: Anders Poulsen

9 December 2013 18	AaB	5 – 0	Viborg	Aalborg
19:00 CET	Dalsgaard 4'; Kusk 9'; Jacobsen 12'; Jönsson 48'; Thomsen 67'	Report		Stadium: Nordjyske Arena; Attendance: 7,796; Referee: Jakob Kehlet

23 February 2014 19	Brøndby	2 – 2	AaB	Brøndby
19:00 CET	Zohore 17'; Kahlenberg 90'	Report	Jönsson 22'; Stenderup 89' (o.g.)	Stadium: Brøndby Stadion; Attendance: 15,893; Referee: Jakob Kehlet

2 March 2014 20	AaB	0 – 0	Vestsjælland	Aalborg
15:00 CET		Report		Stadium: Nordjyske Arena; Attendance: 5,519; Referee: Peter Kjærsgaard-Andersen

8 March 2014 21	AGF	2 – 5	AaB	Aarhus
17:00 CET	Olsen 30', 73'	Report	Kusk 13', 37'; Jönsson 15'; Risgård 44'; Thomsen 65'	Stadium: NRGi Park; Attendance: 6,570; Referee: Michael Tykgaard

16 March 2014 22	AaB	1 – 0	Midtjylland	Aalborg
17:00 CET	Risgård 29'	Report		Stadium: Nordjyske Arena; Attendance: 11,530; Referee: Michael Johansen

23 March 2014 23	SønderjyskE	3 – 2	AaB	Haderslev
14:00 CET	Okotie 30'; Bechmann 32', 77'	Repport	Spalvis 29', 66'	Stadium: Sydbank Park; Attendance: 2,615; Referee: Anders Poulsen

30 March 2014 24	AaB	2 – 1	Copenhagen	Aalborg
19:00 CEST	Thelander 10'; Curth 84'	Report	Mellberg 82'	Stadium: Nordjyske Arena; Attendance: 11,491; Referee: Kenn Hansen

5 April 2014 25	Midtjylland	2 – 3	AaB	Herning
17:00 CEST	Igboun 14'; Andersson 74'	Report	Thomsen 19'; Spalvis 29', 82'	Stadium: MCH Arena; Attendance: 11,535; Referee: Lars Christoffersen

13 April 2014 26	AaB	2 – 0	Brøndby	Aalborg
19:00 CEST	Spalvis 33', 37'	Report		Stadium: Nordjyske Arena; Attendance: 13,139; Referee: Mads-Kristoffer Kristoffersen

16 April 2014 27	Viborg	0 – 2	AaB	Viborg
20:00 CEST		Report	Ahlmann 49'; Egeris 60' (o.g.)	Stadium: Energi Viborg Arena; Attendance: 6,803; Referee: Jakob Kehlet

20 April 2014 28	AaB	1 – 2	Randers	Aalborg
17:00 CEST	Ahlmann 15'	Report	Kamper 11'; Schwartz 37'	Stadium: Nordjyske Arena; Attendance: 10,005; Referee: Jens Maae

26 April 2014 29	OB	2 – 3	AaB	Odense
17:00 CEST	Risgård 47' (o.g.); Kadrii 49'	Report	Spalvis 9', 72'; Risgård 80'	Stadium: TRE-FOR Park; Attendance: 8,495; Referee: Dennis Mogensen

3 May 2014 30	AaB	0 – 2	Esbjerg	Aalborg
17:00 CEST		Report	Pušić 54' van Buren 90+2'	Stadium: Nordjyske Arena; Attendance: 11,802; Referee: Michael Tykgaard

7 May 2014 31	Nordsjælland	2 – 4	AaB	Farum
20:00 CEST	Christiansen 9'; John 31'	Report	Jacobsen 24', 29'; Petersen 44'; Kusk 64'	Stadium: Farum Park; Attendance: 6,872; Referee: Anders Poulsen

11 May 2014 32	Vestsjælland	0 – 0	AaB	Slagelse
17:00 CEST		Report		Stadium: Harboe Arena Slagelse; Attendance: 4,473; Referee: Lars Christoffersen

18 May 2014 33	AaB	1 – 0	AGF	Aalborg
17:00 CEST	Pedersen 83'	Report		Stadium: Nordjyske Arena; Attendance: 12,748; Referee: Michael Johansen

=== Danish Cup ===
29 August 2013 Second round	Silkeborg IF	0 – 2	AaB	Silkeborg
20:30 CEST		Report	Kusk 20', 26' (pen.)	Stadium: Mascot Park; Attendance: 1,396; Referee: Michael Tykgaard

24 September 2013 Third round	HB Køge	1 – 2	AaB	Herfølge
20:00 CEST	Kjær 36'	Report	Kusk 2'; Thomsen 71'	Stadium: SEAS-NVE Park; Attendance: 978; Referee: Peter Kjærsgaard-Andersen

30 October 2013 Fourth round	FC Sydvest 05 Tønder	1 – 3	AaB	Løgumkloster
14:00 CET	Ingemann 22'	Report	Petersen 43' (pen.); Jacobsen 44'; Frederiksen 52'	Stadium: Løgum Stadion; Attendance: 455; Referee: Dennis Mogensen

26 February 2014 Quarter-finals	AGF	1 – 4	AaB	Aarhus
17:45 CET	Petersen 79'	Report	Thomsen 2'; Olsen 33' (o.g.); Kusk 66'; Kristensen 71'	Stadium: NRGi Park; Attendance: 4,517; Referee: Michael Tykgaard

27 March 2014 Semi-finals, first leg	AC Horsens	1 – 3	AaB	Horsens
20:00 CET	Bjerregaard 46'	Report	Due 2'; Spalvis 65', 78'	Stadium: CASA Arena; Attendance: 2,323; Referee: Mads-Kristoffer Kristoffersen

9 April 2014 Semi-finals, second leg	AaB	2 – 1 (5 – 2 agg.)	AC Horsens	Aalborg
17:45 CET	Kusk 28'; Spalvis 45'	Report	Bjerregaard 82'	Stadium: Nordjyske Arena; Attendance: 5,283; Referee: Michael Tykgaard

15 May 2014 Final	AaB	4 – 2	Copenhagen	Copenhagen
20:00 CEST	Thelander 41', 44'; Ahlmann 72'; Frederiksen 74'	Report	Cornelius 18'; Gíslason 89'	Stadium: Parken; Attendance: 27,824; Referee: Jakob Kehlet

=== UEFA Europa League ===
==== Qualifying phase and play-off round ====
===== Second qualifying round =====
18 July 2013 First leg	Dila Gori (Georgia (country))	3 – 0	(Denmark) AaB	Tbilisi, Georgia
16:00 CEST	Modebadze 61'; Gorelishvili 68', 90'	Report		Stadium: Mikheil Meskhi Stadium; Attendance: 1,800; Referee: Marco Fritz (Germany)

25 July 2013 Second leg	AaB (Denmark)	0 – 0 (0 – 3 agg.)	(Georgia (country)) Dila Gori	Aalborg, Denmark
20:15 CEST		Report		Stadium: Nordjyske Arena; Attendance: 5,472; Referee: Robert Małek (Poland)

== Statistics ==
=== Appearances ===
This includes all competitive matches. The list is sorted by shirt number when total appearances are equal.

Rnk	Pos	No.	Player	Superliga	Cup	Europa League	Total
1	GK	1	(Denmark) Nicolai Larsen	32	7	2	41
1	MF	17	(Denmark) Kasper Kusk	33	6	2	41
3	MF	23	(Denmark) Nicolaj Thomsen	33	5	2	40
4	MF	2	(Denmark) Patrick Kristensen	30	6	2	38
5	DF	3	(Denmark) Jakob Ahlmann	29	6	1	36
6	MF	8	(Denmark) Rasmus Würtz	28	4	2	34
6	MF	21	(Denmark) Kasper Risgård	29	5	0	34
8	DF	26	(Denmark) Rasmus Thelander	26	4	2	32
9	MF	7	(Denmark) Anders Due	21	6	2	29
9	FW	18	(Denmark) Anders K. Jacobsen	24	5	0	29
11	MF	9	(Denmark) Thomas Augustinussen	21	7	0	28
11	FW	19	(Denmark) Søren Frederiksen	22	4	2	28
13	DF	5	(Denmark) Kenneth Emil Petersen	21	5	0	26
14	FW	33	(Lithuania) Lukas Spalvis	18	7	0	25
15	DF	20	(Denmark) Henrik Dalsgaard	18	3	2	23
16	DF	4	(Denmark) Lasse Nielsen	17	2	2	21
17	FW	11	(Sweden) Rasmus Jönsson	19	1	0	20
18	MF	14	(Denmark) Mathias Wichmann	11	6	2	19
19	FW	10	(Denmark) Jeppe Curth	14	2	2	18
20	FW	29	(Denmark) Rolf Toft	6	0	2	8
21	DF	32	(Denmark) Kasper Pedersen	3	3	1	7
22	MF	30	(Denmark) Andreas Bruhn	4	2	0	6
23	FW	15	(Faroe Islands) Gilli Sørensen	0	1	0	1
23	GK	22	(Denmark) Carsten Christensen	1	0	0	1
23	MF	28	(Faroe Islands) Hallur Hansson	0	1	0	1

=== Goalscorers ===
This includes all competitive matches. The list is sorted by shirt number when total goals are equal.

Rnk	Pos	No.	Player	Superliga	Cup	Europa League	Total
1	MF	17	(Denmark) Kasper Kusk	12	5	0	17
2	FW	33	(Lithuania) Lukas Spalvis	8	3	0	11
3	FW	18	(Denmark) Anders K. Jacobsen	7	1	0	8
4	FW	11	(Sweden) Rasmus Jönsson	6	0	0	6
4	MF	23	(Denmark) Nicolaj Thomsen	4	2	0	6
6	MF	21	(Denmark) Kasper Risgård	5	0	0	5
7	DF	3	(Denmark) Jakob Ahlmann	2	1	0	3
7	FW	19	(Denmark) Søren Frederiksen	1	2	0	3
7	DF	26	(Denmark) Rasmus Thelander	1	2	0	3
10	DF	5	(Denmark) Kenneth Emil Petersen	1	1	0	2
10	FW	10	(Denmark) Jeppe Curth	2	0	0	2
10	DF	20	(Denmark) Henrik Dalsgaard	2	0	0	2
13	MF	2	(Denmark) Patrick Kristensen	0	1	0	1
13	MF	7	(Denmark) Anders Due	0	1	0	1
13	MF	8	(Denmark) Rasmus Würtz	1	0	0	1
13	DF	32	(Denmark) Kasper Pedersen	1	0	0	1
—	Own Goals			7	1	0	8
TOTALS				60	20	0	80

=== Assists ===
This includes all competitive matches. The list is sorted by shirt number when total assists are equal.

Rnk	Pos	No.	Player	Superliga	Cup	Europa League	Total
1	MF	17	(Denmark) Kasper Kusk	8	6	0	14
2	MF	21	(Denmark) Kasper Risgård	6	2	0	8
3	FW	18	(Denmark) Anders K. Jacobsen	5	1	0	6
3	MF	23	(Denmark) Nicolaj Thomsen	6	0	0	6
5	FW	11	(Sweden) Rasmus Jönsson	4	1	0	5
6	MF	2	(Denmark) Patrick Kristensen	1	3	0	4
6	DF	20	(Denmark) Henrik Dalsgaard	4	0	0	4
8	DF	3	(Denmark) Jakob Ahlmann	2	0	0	2
8	MF	7	(Denmark) Anders Due	2	0	0	2
8	MF	14	(Denmark) Mathias Wichmann	2	0	0	2
8	FW	33	(Lithuania) Lukas Spalvis	1	1	0	2
TOTALS				41	14	0	55

=== Clean sheets ===
This includes all competitive matches. The list is sorted by shirt number when total clean sheets are equal.

Rnk	Pos	No.	Player	Superliga	Cup	Europa League	Total
1	GK	1	(Denmark) Nicolai Larsen	11	1	1	13
TOTALS				11	1	1	13

=== Disciplinary record ===
This includes all competitive matches. The list is sorted by shirt number when total cards are equal.

Rnk	Pos.	No.	Player	Superliga		Cup		Europa League		Total	
Rnk	Pos.	No.	Player	Booked	Sent off (straight red)	Booked	Sent off (straight red)	Booked	Sent off (straight red)	Booked	Sent off (straight red)
1	DF	3	(Denmark) Jakob Ahlmann	9	0	1	0	0	0	10	0
1	MF	8	(Denmark) Rasmus Würtz	8	0	1	0	1	0	10	0
3	DF	5	(Denmark) Kenneth Emil Petersen	4	0	0	0	0	0	4	0
3	MF	9	(Denmark) Thomas Augustinussen	4	0	0	0	0	0	4	0
3	DF	20	(Denmark) Henrik Dalsgaard	2	0	1	0	1	0	4	0
6	DF	4	(Denmark) Lasse Nielsen	3	0	0	0	0	0	3	0
7	FW	10	(Denmark) Jeppe Curth	2	0	0	0	0	0	2	0
7	MF	14	(Denmark) Mathias Wichmann	0	0	2	0	0	0	2	0
7	MF	17	(Denmark) Kasper Kusk	2	0	0	0	0	0	2	0
7	DF	26	(Denmark) Rasmus Thelander	2	0	0	0	0	0	2	0
11	GK	1	(Denmark) Nicolai Larsen	1	0	0	0	0	0	1	0
11	MF	2	(Denmark) Patrick Kristensen	1	0	0	0	0	0	1	0
11	FW	11	(Sweden) Rasmus Jönsson	1	0	0	0	0	0	1	0
11	FW	18	(Denmark) Anders K. Jacobsen	1	0	0	0	0	0	1	0
11	FW	19	(Denmark) Søren Frederiksen	1	0	0	0	0	0	1	0
11	MF	21	(Denmark) Kasper Risgård	1	0	0	0	0	0	1	0
11	MF	30	(Denmark) Andreas Bruhn	1	0	0	0	0	0	1	0
11	DF	32	(Denmark) Kasper Pedersen	0	0	1	0	0	0	1	0
11	FW	33	(Lithuania) Lukas Spalvis	1	0	0	0	0	0	1	0
TOTALS				44	0	6	0	2	0	52	0

=== Summary ===
Games played	42 (33 Danish Superliga, 7 Danish Cup, 2 UEFA Europa League)
Games won	25 (18 Danish Superliga, 7 Danish Cup)
Games drawn	9 (8 Danish Superliga, 1 UEFA Europa League)
Games lost	8 (7 Danish Superliga, 1 UEFA Europa League)
Goals scored	80 (60 Danish Superliga, 20 Danish Cup)
Goals conceded	48 (38 Danish Superliga, 7 Danish Cup, 3 UEFA Europa League)
Goal difference	+32 (+22 Danish Superliga, +13 Danish Cup, -3 UEFA Europa League)
Clean sheets	13 (13 Danish Superliga, 1 Danish Cup, 1 UEFA Europa League)
Yellow cards	52 (44 Danish Superliga, 6 Danish Cup, 2 UEFA Europa League)
Red cards	0
Best result(s)	W 5 – 0 (H) v Viborg FF – Danish Superliga – 9 December 2013
Worst result(s)	L 3 – 0 (A) v Dila – UEFA Europa League – 18 July 2013 & L 3 – 0 (A) v FC København – Danish Superliga – 20 October 2013
Most appearances	Nicolai Larsen & Kasper Kusk (41 appearances)
Top scorer(s)	Kasper Kusk (17 goals)
Top assister(s)	Kasper Kusk (14 assists)
Worst discipline	Jakob Ahlmann & Rasmus Würtz (10 (yellow card) )

== Awards ==
=== Player ===
No.	Player	Award	Month	Source
17	(Denmark) Kasper Kusk	Tipsbladet Profil of the Autumn	December 2013	
17	(Denmark) Kasper Kusk	Superliga player of the Month, March	March 2014	
33	(Lithuania) Lukas Spalvis	Superliga player of the Month, April	April 2014	
8	(Denmark) Rasmus Würtz	Tipsbladet Profil of the Spring	May 2014	
8	(Denmark) Rasmus Würtz	AaB Player of the Season 2013–14	August 2014	

=== Team ===
Award	Month	Source
Fairplay	May 2014	
