= Henrik Dalsgaard =

Danish footballer (born 1989)

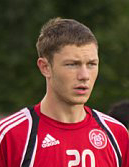
- Dalsgaard with AaB in 2011

Personal information
- Full name: Henrik Dalsgaard
- Date of birth: 27 July 1989 (age 37)
- Place of birth: Roum, Denmark
- Height: 1.92 m (6 ft 4 in)
- Position: Right-back

Team information
- Current team: AaB (individual coach)

Youth career
- BMK 90
- Hersom/Bjerregrav IF
- 2006–2007: FK Viborg

Senior career*
Years	Team	Apps	(Gls)
2007–2008	Møldrup/Tostrup IF	41	(84)
2008–2016	AaB	166	(9)
2016–2017	Zulte Waregem	35	(9)
2017–2021	Brentford	147	(6)
2021–2024	Midtjylland	77	(6)
2024–2026	AGF	58	(3)
Total		530	(117)

International career
2011	Denmark U20	1	(0)
2009–2011	Denmark U21	11	(0)
2013	Denmark League XI	1	(0)
2016–2020	Denmark	26	(1)
- * Club domestic league appearances and goals

Henrik Dalsgaard (born 27 July 1989) is a Danish former professional footballer who played as a right-back. He is currently individual coach at AaB.

Dalsgaard began his playing career in his homeland with AaB, with whom he won the Danish league and cup double in the 2013–14 season. Dalsgaard transferred to Zulte Waregem in 2015 and won the Belgian Cup in the second of his two seasons with the club. A move to England with Championship club Brentford followed in 2017 and in 2021 Dalsgaard was part of the Brentford squad which was promoted to the Premier League. Following his departure, Dalsgaard returned to the Danish Superliga, where he played for FC Midtjylland and then AGF until his retirement as a player in 2026. Dalsgaard was a Denmark international and a member of the Danes' 2018 World Cup squad.

== Club career ==
=== AaB ===
Dalsgaard began his career as a forward with Danish lower-league clubs BMK 90, FK Viborg, Hersom/Bjerregrav IF and Møldrup/Tostrup IF. After scoring prolifically for Møldrup/Tostrup IF, he signed a two-year contract with Danish Superliga club AaB on a free transfer in December 2008 and no compensation was paid to his previous clubs, due to the lack of a national transfer system in Denmark. He made the first professional appearances of his career late in the 2008–09 season and scored his first professional goal in a 2–2 draw with FC Nordsjælland on 31 May 2009.

Dalsgaard became a regular in the team over the course of the 2009–10 and 2010–11 seasons and was moved from his forward position onto the wing and then to right back by the 2011–12 season. He made 21 appearances and scored two goals during the 2013–14 season, in which AaB won the Danish Superliga and Danish Cup double. Dalsgaard remained with the club until December 2015, when he departed on a free transfer. He made 196 appearances and scored 10 goals during eight seasons at the Nordjyske Arena.

=== Zulte Waregem ===
In December 2015, Dalsgaard moved to Belgium to join Pro League club Zulte Waregem on a 2 1/2-year contract, with an option for a further year. In an 18-month spell affected by a hip injury, he made 38 appearances, scored 9 goals and helped the club to win the 2016–17 Belgian Cup. Dalsgaard left the club on 23 May 2017.

=== Brentford ===
On 23 May 2017, Dalsgaard moved to England to join Championship club Brentford on a three-year contract for an undisclosed fee (reported to be £1 million), effective 1 July 2017. He immediately displaced previous first-choice right back Maxime Colin and made the position his own after Colin's departure at the end of the summer transfer window. Dalsgaard continued as a regular in the team, despite suffering with a concussion and a heel injury during the opening months of the season. A heel injury suffered during a 2–0 victory over Birmingham City on 1 November 2017 saw Dalsgaard miss three months of the season. He regained his place in early February 2018 and his scored his first goal for the club with the only goal for the match versus Nottingham Forest on 10 April. Dalsgaard finished the 2017–18 season with 32 appearances and one goal.

Dalsgaard was the team's regular starting right back through the first half of the 2018–19 season. In February 2019, head coach Thomas Frank reported that Dalsgaard had stepped up into a leadership role within the squad and later in the month, a lack of available centre backs at the club saw him pressed into service on the right side of a three-man central defence. He finished the season with 43 appearances and two goals.

After beginning the 2019–20 season as an ever-present at right back, Dalsgaard signed a one-year contract extension on 29 November 2019. In addition, his leadership role within the squad was recognised with the vice-captaincy. Dalsgaard made a career-high 47 appearances and scored two goals during the season, with one coming as a late consolation in the 2–1 2020 Championship play-off final defeat to Fulham.

Dalsgaard was again Thomas Frank's first choice right back during the 2020–21 season and he deputised for captain Pontus Jansson during the latter's spells out injured. Despite missing the final 9 matches of the regular season with a knee injury, Dalsgaard returned to play in each of Brentford's three 2021 playoff matches and he celebrated promotion to the Premier League with a 2–0 victory over Swansea City in the Final. Owing to the 79th minute substitution of captain Pontus Jansson, Dalsgaard took the armband for the remainder of the match. He finished the 2020–21 season with 40 appearances and two goals. Having entered the final month of his contract, Dalsgaard transferred away from the Brentford Community Stadium on 7 June 2021. He ended his four-year spell with 162 appearances, seven goals and as Brentford's then most-capped international player, with 22 caps won while contracted to the club.

=== FC Midtjylland ===
On 7 June 2021, Dalsgaard returned to Denmark to sign a three-year contract with Superliga club FC Midtjylland on a free transfer, effective 1 July 2021. He made 43 appearances and scored two goals during the 2021–22 Danish Cup-winning season. Dalsgaard made 35 appearances and scored two goals during the 2022–23 season, in which the club narrowly qualified for the 2023–24 UEFA Europa Conference League via a playoff. Dalsgaard made 32 appearances and scored four goals during the Superliga championship-winning 2023–24 season. He departed the club when his contract expired at the end of the 2023–24 season. During his three seasons at the MCH Arena, Dalsgaard made 110 appearances and scored eight goals.

=== AGF ===
On 27 May 2024, it was announced that Dalsgaard had signed a one-year contract with Superliga club AGF on a free transfer, effective 1 July 2024. He made 28 appearances and scored one goal during the 2024–25 season. On 13 June 2025, it was announced that Dalsgaard had been retained for the 2025–26 season. He made 35 appearances during the 2025–26 season and scored one goal, which came in a 2–0 win over Brøndby on the final day, which secured the Superliga championship. In recognition of his performances, Dalsgaard was named in the Superliga Team of the Year and was twice named Superliga Player of the Month. He retired as a player in June 2026 and ended his AGF career with 66 appearances and three goals.

== International career ==
Dalsgaard represented Denmark at youth level and won 12 caps for the U20 and U21 teams. He made one appearance for the Denmark League XI in 2013. Dalsgaard's form for Zulte Waregem during the 2015–16 season saw him win four caps for the senior team during the second half of the campaign. He won 26 senior caps between 2016 and 2020, scoring one goal. In recognition of his contribution to Denmark's qualification for the 2018 World Cup, Dalsgaard was named in the 2017 Denmark Team of the Year. At the World Cup, he played every minute of the four matches of Denmark's run to the last-16.

== Coaching career ==
In August 2026, Dalsgaard joined AaB as an individual coach, working with both first team and academy players.

== Personal life ==
Dalsgaard attended Viborg Business School and worked for Skals Elektronik.

== Career statistics ==
=== Club ===
Appearances and goals by club, season and competition
Club	Season	League			National cup (Note: Includes Danish Cup, Belgian Cup, FA Cup)		League cup (Note: Includes EFL Cup)		Europe		Other		Total	
Club	Season	Division	Apps	Goals	Apps	Goals	Apps	Goals	Apps	Goals	Apps	Goals	Apps	Goals
AaB	2008–09	Danish Superliga	4	1	0	0	—		0	0	—		4	1
AaB	2009–10	Danish Superliga	25	0	3	0	—		1 (Note: Appearances in Europa League)	0	—		29	0
AaB	2010–11	Danish Superliga	15	1	2	0	—		—		—		17	1
AaB	2011–12	Danish Superliga	30	2	1	0	—		—		—		31	2
AaB	2012–13	Danish Superliga	31	2	2	0	—		—		—		33	2
AaB	2013–14	Danish Superliga	18	2	3	0	—		2	0	—		23	2
AaB	2014–15	Danish Superliga	26	1	3	1	—		10 (Note: 8 appearances in Europa League, 2 appearances in Champions League)	0	—		39	2
AaB	2015–16	Danish Superliga	17	0	1	0	—		—		—		18	0
AaB	Total		166	9	15	1	—		13	0	—		194	10
Zulte Waregem	2015–16	Belgian Pro League	19	3	—		—		—		—		19	3
Zulte Waregem	2016–17	Belgian First Division A	16	6	3	0	—		—		—		19	6
Zulte Waregem	Total		35	9	3	0	—		—		—		38	9
Brentford	2017–18	Championship	29	1	0	0	3	0	—		—		32	1
Brentford	2018–19	Championship	40	2	2	0	1	0	—		—		43	2
Brentford	2019–20	Championship	43	1	0	0	1	0	—		3 (Note: Appearances in Championship play-offs)	1	47	2
Brentford	2020–21	Championship	35	2	0	0	2	0	—		3	0	40	2
Brentford	Total		147	6	2	0	7	0	—		6	1	162	7
FC Midtjylland	2021–22	Danish Superliga	28	2	6	0	—		9 (Note: 6 appearances in Europa League, 2 appearances in Champions League, 1 appearance in Europa Conference League)	0	—		43	2
FC Midtjylland	2022–23	Danish Superliga	24	1	0	0	—		11 (Note: 7 appearances in Europa League, 4 appearances in Champions League)	1	0	0	35	2
FC Midtjylland	2023–24	Danish Superliga	25	3	2	0	—		5 (Note: Appearances in Europa Conference League)	1	—		32	4
FC Midtjylland	Total		77	6	8	0	—		25	2	0	0	110	8
AGF	2024–25	Danish Superliga	26	1	2	0	—		—		—		28	1
AGF	2025–26	Danish Superliga	32	2	6	0	—		—		—		38	2
AGF	Total		58	3	8	0	—		—		—		66	3
Career total			489	33	36	1	7	0	38	2	6	1	575	37

=== International ===
As of match played 7 July 2021

Appearances and goals by national team and year
National team	Year	Apps	Goals
Denmark	2016	3	0
Denmark	2017	5	0
Denmark	2018	10	0
Denmark	2019	7	1
Denmark	2020	1	0
Total		26	1

Scores and results list Denmark's goal tally first, score column indicates score after each Dalsgaard goal.

List of international goals scored by Henrik Dalsgaard
No.	Date	Venue	Opponent	Score	Result	Competition	Ref.
1	26 March 2019	St. Jakob-Park, Basel, Switzerland	Switzerland	3–3	3–3	UEFA Euro 2020 qualification	

== Honours ==
AaB

- Danish Superliga: 2013–14
- Danish Cup: 2013–14

Zulte Waregem

- Belgian Cup: 2016–17

Brentford

- EFL Championship play-offs: 2021

Midtjylland

- Danish Superliga: 2023–24
- Danish Cup: 2021–22

AGF

- Danish Superliga: 2025–26

Individual

- Denmark Team of the Year: 2017
- Danish Superliga Player of the Month: April 2026, May 2026
- Danish Superliga Team of the Year: 2025–26
