= David Nielsen =

Danish footballer and manager (born 1976)

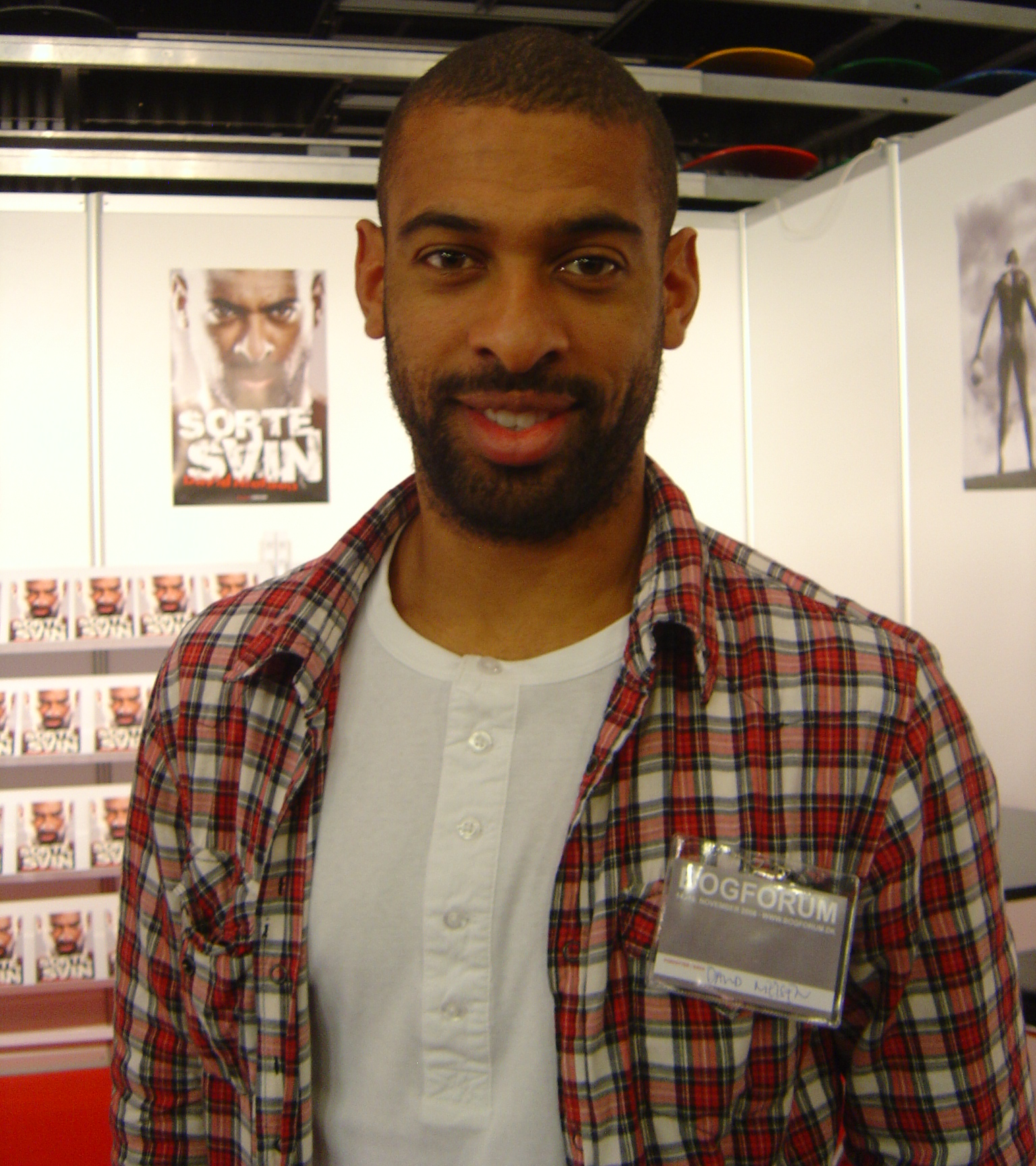
- Nielsen in 2008

Personal information
- Full name: David Jean Nielsen
- Date of birth: 1 December 1976 (age 49)
- Place of birth: Skagen, Denmark
- Height: 1.83 m (6 ft 0 in)
- Position: Forward

Youth career
- 1982–1992: Skagen
- 1992–1993: Frederikshavn

Senior career*
Years	Team	Apps	(Gls)
1993–1996	OB	9	(2)
1996	→ Lyngby (loan)	13	(10)
1996–1997	Fortuna Düsseldorf	13	(1)
1997–2001	Copenhagen	108	(36)
2000–2001	→ Grimsby Town (loan)	16	(5)
2001–2002	Wimbledon	23	(4)
2001–2002	→ Norwich City (loan)	5	(5)
2002–2003	Norwich City	21	(3)
2003–2005	AaB	40	(17)
2005–2006	Midtjylland	30	(8)
2006–2007	Start	13	(5)
2007	OB	14	(3)
2008	→ Strømsgodset (loan)	23	(9)
2009–2010	Brann	33	(4)
2011	Fyllingen	0	(0)
Total		361	(112)

International career
1992	Denmark U16	3	(3)
1991–1992	Denmark U17	21	(14)
1993–1995	Denmark U19	18	(13)
1996–1997	Denmark U21	8	(3)

Managerial career
- 2011: Løv-Ham (assistant)
- 2011–2013: Nest-Sotra
- 2014: Strømsgodset (assistant)
- 2014–2015: Strømsgodset
- 2015–2017: Lyngby
- 2017–2022: AGF
- 2023–2024: A.E. Kifisia
- 2024: Lyngby
- 2024: Lillestrøm
- 2025–2026: Horsens
- * Club domestic league appearances and goals

David Jean Nielsen (born 1 December 1976) is a Danish professional football manager, and former player.

He played for a number of Danish clubs, as well as Fortuna Düsseldorf in Germany and English clubs Grimsby Town, Wimbledon and Norwich City. His greatest triumph was the 1997 Danish Cup victory, which he won with Danish club Copenhagen. He played 46 matches and scored 33 goals for various Danish youth national teams between 1992 and 1997, including eight games and three goals for the Denmark U21 national team.

Nielsen has attracted controversy at various times in his career for falling into serious gambling debt, assaulting a teammate and then, in November 2008, admitting matchfixing in a Danish game played in 2004.

== Playing career ==
Born in Sønderborg but raised in Skagen, Nielsen started playing youth football in Skagen and Frederikshavn. He scored 17 goals in 24 matches for the Danish under-16 and under-17 national teams. He received offers from English club Tottenham Hotspur and Bayern Munich in Germany, but decided to stay in Denmark, as he was brought to OB in the top-flight Danish Superliga in May 1993, 16 years old. Here he became known for his elaborate goal celebration, a round off stretch jump with a backtuck.

He was loaned out to Lyngby in January 1996, where he got his national breakthrough with 10 goals in 13 league games. When his Odense contract ran out in the Summer 1996, he moved abroad to play for Fortuna Düsseldorf in the Bundesliga championship. He did not find playing success with the club, and after half a year in Germany, Nielsen moved back to Denmark to play for Copenhagen in a DEM 600,000 transfer deal in February 1997. He played three and a half years at Copenhagen, with whom he won the 1997 Danish Cup. He was club top goalscorer in 1998, 1999 and 2000, and was elected 1999 Copenhagen Player of the Year.

He was loaned out to English club Grimsby Town in the second tier of English football, the English First Division in October 2000, as Grimsby had a hard time scoring goals. When his loan deal ended in March 2001, Nielsen moved on to English club Wimbledon on a free transfer. He joined Norwich City on loan in December 2001, and scored five goals in five games during his loan spell, including one against his parent club, prompting Norwich manager Nigel Worthington to pay £210,000 to Wimbledon to secure his services on a permanent basis. Whilst playing for Norwich City he was a member of the team that reached the final of the First Division play-offs in May 2002. However, he was unable to maintain his initial impressive scoring rate and left the club at his own request to return to Denmark in August 2003.

He signed with Superliga club AaB, where he rediscovered his goalscoring ability. Following a training ground bust-up with teammate Allan Gaarde in February 2005, Nielsen was fired by the club. Within days, he was hired by league rivals Midtjylland, to replace Egyptian striker Mohamed Zidan. He was let go by FCM in May 2006, and he moved abroad to play for Norwegian club Start. He became an immediate hit scoring seven goals in 21 matches, but left the club during the reign of manager Stig Inge Bjørnebye. On 20 July 2007, he signed a three-year contract with the Danish Superliga side OB. On 26 March, he went on a loan deal with the Norwegian club Strømsgodset for the rest of 2008.

Nielsen was sold to the Norwegian club Brann as a part of a deal where Njougu Demba Nyren went in the opposite direction in January 2009. During his stay in Brann, Nielsen has spent most of his time as a substitute, and when he had been playing, he had the role as a facilitator for the other striker Erik Huseklepp. After his contract with Brann expired in June 2010, Nielsen planned to stay in Bergen and, together with Per Ove Ludvigsen and Kjetil Knutsen, to offer organized soccer practice for kids through a company called Max Fotball.

=== Controversies ===
By April 2004, David Nielsen and fellow AaB teammate Jimmy Nielsen had racked up a debt of €201,000 with bookmakers in Aalborg. AaB director Lynge Jacobsen decided to help out financially and arranged for gambling addiction counselling.

In his 2008 autobiography, Nielsen admitted playing to deliberately lose a Superliga match between AaB and his former club Copenhagen in May 2004. As AaB had lost the Danish Cup final to Copenhagen earlier that year, winning the Superliga would propel Copenhagen into the UEFA Champions League and hand their UEFA Cup-berth as the Danish Cup winners on to the losing finalists from AaB. Nielsen was also motivated by his gambling debts, as UEFA Cup qualification would wield him a personal DKK300,000 bonus. AaB and Copenhagen drew the match, and Copenhagen eventually won the 2003–04 Superliga championship by one point.

In February 2005, Nielsen was sacked by AaB when he physically attacked teammate Allan Gaarde during a training session, leaving him with a concussion. Nielsen later explained in his autobiography that Gaarde was "pretentious... talking loudly about wine in Italian. "I told him: 'The next time you speak Italian I will break you in half. You're not f***ing Italian – you spent eight months there.' So when he did it again I decided to break his shitting legs like sticks. I jumped at him and bang. Jackpot. Felt good."

During the pre-season of 2010–11, in a friendly against English side Leeds United, he made a 'shocking high-footed' tackle against winger Robert Snodgrass, who was injured and missed the start of the campaign.

== Managerial career ==
Nielsen was appointed assistant manager of Løv-Ham on 27 May 2011. Later that summer, he was appointed manager of Nest-Sotra. After saving the club from relegation from the 2. Divisjon in 2011, he led them to a fourth place in 2012 and promotion to the 1. division in 2013.

On 11 November 2013, he was appointed assistant manager of Strømsgodset. After just seven months, he was appointed manager, when Ronny Deila left for the vacant managing position at Celtic. On 26 May 2015, Strømsgodset announced that Nielsen would step down as manager in mutual agreement with the club.

On 17 June 2015, he signed a three-year contract as manager for Danish 1st Division club Lyngby.

On 30 September 2017, he signed a three-year contract as coach for Danish Superliga team AGF. In May 2022 Nielsen left AGF by mutual consent.

On 8 December 2023, Nielsen signed a contract with A.E. Kifisia in the Greek Super League for the remaining six months of the season. He was dismissed on 29 January 2024, only six weeks after being appointed.

Nielsen returned as manager of Lyngby on 5 March 2024 on a contract running until the end of the season following the sacking of Magne Hoseth.

In late August 2024 he was presented as the new manager of Lillestrøm SK, on a contract spanning the rest of 2024. After four league games, Lillestrøm had gathered one point and a goal difference of 2–12, and were bottom of the table. Nielsen was sacked in the evening of 30 September. The sole point came against Rosenborg, where his son Noah Holm played and scored, according to VG the first time a son scored against his father's team in Norway since 1987.

In March 2025 he was appointed the head coach of Danish 1st Division club AC Horsens on a three-year contract, replacing Martin Retov. In March 2026 he resigned from this position, as the club was in a disappointing 5th place. Afterwards the club said, that they did consider firing Nielsen, if he had not resigned.

== Personal life ==
Nielsen was born in Denmark to a DR Congolese, Malagasy father and a Danish mother.

== Career statistics ==
Appearances and goals by club, season and competition
Club	Season	League			Cup		Total	
Club	Season	Division	Apps	Goals	Apps	Goals	Apps	Goals
OB	1994–95	Danish Superliga	8	2			8	2
OB	1995–96	Danish Superliga	1	0			1	0
OB	Total		9	2			9	2
Lyngby (loan)	1995–96	Danish Superliga	13	10			13	10
Fortuna Düsseldorf	1996–97	Bundesliga	13	1	2	1	15	2
Copenhagen	1996–97	Danish Superliga	14	1			14	1
Copenhagen	1997–98	Danish Superliga	31	11			31	11
Copenhagen	1998–99	Danish Superliga	30	15			30	15
Copenhagen	1999–00	Danish Superliga	26	8			26	8
Copenhagen	2000–01	Danish Superliga	7	1			7	1
Copenhagen	Total		108	36			108	36
Grimsby Town (loan)	2000–01	First Division	17	5	2	1	19	6
Wimbledon	2000–01	First Division	11	2	0	0	11	2
Wimbledon	2001–02	First Division	12	2	1	0	13	2
Wimbledon	Total		23	4	1	0	24	4
Norwich City	2001–02	First Division	23	8	3	0	26	8
Norwich City	2002–03	First Division	33	6	4	0	37	6
Norwich City	2003–04	First Division	2	0	1	0	3	0
Norwich City	Total		58	14	8	0	66	14
AaB	2003–04	Danish Superliga	24	11			24	11
AaB	2004–05	Danish Superliga	16	6			16	6
AaB	Total		40	17			40	17
Midtjylland	2004–05	Danish Superliga	10	2			10	2
Midtjylland	2005–06	Danish Superliga	20	6			20	6
Midtjylland	Total		30	8			30	8
Start	2006	Tippeligaen	13	5	2	3	15	8
Start	2007	Tippeligaen	8	2	1	1	9	3
Start	Total		21	7	3	4	24	11
OB	2007–08	Danish Superliga	14	3	0	0	14	3
Strømsgodset (loan)	2008	Tippeligaen	23	9	3	2	26	11
Brann	2009	Tippeligaen	23	4	2	2	25	6
Brann	2010	Tippeligaen	10	0	0	0	10	0
Brann	Total		33	4	2	2	35	6
Fyllingen	2011	Third Division	0	0	1	0	1	0
Career total			402	120	22	10	424	130

== Managerial statistics ==
As of 9 March 2026

Managerial record by team and tenure
Team	Nat	From	To	Record					
Team	Nat	From	To	M	W	D	L	Win%	Ref.
Nest-Sotra	(Norway)	13 July 2011	11 November 2013	72	41	10	21	56.94	
Strømsgodset	(Norway)	7 June 2014	26 May 2015	33	14	5	14	42.42	
Lyngby	(Denmark)	17 June 2015	30 September 2017	92	47	17	28	51.09	
AGF	(Denmark)	30 September 2017	22 May 2022	184	73	51	60	39.67	
A.E. Kifisia	(Greece)	8 December 2023	29 January 2024	7	1	2	4	14.29	
Lyngby	(Denmark)	5 March 2024	30 June 2024	13	5	4	4	38.46	
Lillestrøm	(Norway)	23 August 2024	30 September 2024	4	0	1	3	0.00	
Horsens	(Denmark)	1 March 2025	10 March 2026	34	14	7	13	41.18	
Total				439	195	97	147	44.42	—

== Honours ==
=== Player ===
Copenhagen

- Danish Cup: 1997

Individual

- Copenhagen Player of the Year: 1999

=== Manager ===
Lyngby

- Danish 1st Division: 2015–16
