= Rasmus Thelander =

Danish footballer (born 1991)

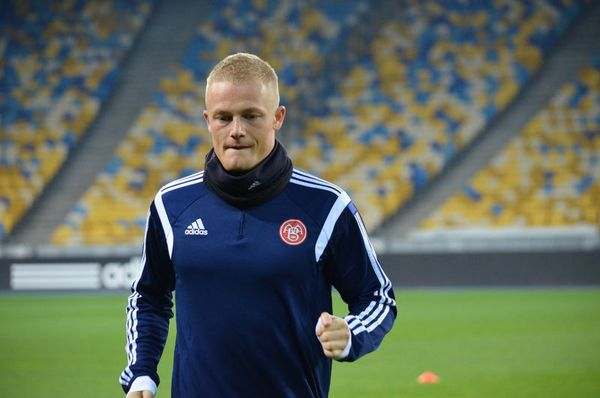
- Thelander with AaB in 2014

Personal information
- Full name: Rasmus Moradeyo Thelander
- Date of birth: 9 July 1991 (age 35)
- Place of birth: Copenhagen, Denmark
- Height: 1.91 m (6 ft 3 in)
- Position: Centre-back

Team information
- Current team: Omonia Aradippou
- Number: 5

Youth career
- Herlev
- AB

Senior career*
Years	Team	Apps	(Gls)
2009–2012	AB	41	(3)
2012–2015	AaB	53	(4)
2015–2017	Panathinaikos	26	(1)
2017–2018	Zürich	22	(0)
2018–2019	Vitesse	9	(0)
2019–2022	AaB	74	(5)
2022	Ferencváros	3	(0)
2022–2024	AaB	39	(5)
2024	Silkeborg	9	(0)
2025	Lyngby	12	(1)
2025–	Omonia Aradippou	27	(2)

International career
2009	Denmark U18	1	(0)
2010	Denmark U19	1	(0)
2012	Denmark U20	1	(0)
- * Club domestic league appearances and goals as of 14 June 2026

Rasmus Moradeyo Thelander (born 9 July 1991) is a Danish professional footballer who plays as a centre-back for Cypriot First Division club Omonia Aradippou.

A tall and physically dominant defender, Thelander is known for his aerial strength, leadership qualities, and aggressive style of play. He began his senior career with Akademisk Boldklub (AB), before moving to AaB, where he was part of the squad that won the Danish Superliga and Danish Cup double in 2013–14. Over the course of his career, he has also played for clubs in Greece, Switzerland, the Netherlands, and Hungary, including Panathinaikos and Zürich. Internationally, Thelander represented Denmark at various youth levels.

== Club career ==
=== Early years ===
Thelander was born in Copenhagen and began his youth career at Herlev IF, later joining Akademisk Boldklub (AB). He made his senior debut for AB in 2010, going on to make 41 appearances and score three goals over two seasons in the Danish 1st Division.

=== AaB ===
In June 2012, Thelander signed a two-year contract with Danish Superliga club AaB.

During his first season at AaB, Thelander primarily served as a substitute. He established himself as a regular starter in the 2013–14 season following the departure of fellow defender Lasse Nielsen to Dutch club NEC, which created a vacancy in the centre-back position. Thelander subsequently featured in every remaining league match of the season and contributed to AaB winning their first Danish Double.

In the 2014 Danish Cup final, Thelander scored twice in a 4–2 victory over Copenhagen, helping secure the club's cup triumph. His performance earned him the Danish Cup Fighter of the Year award (Årets Pokalfighter).

=== Panathinaikos ===
In July 2015, Thelander joined Super League Greece club Panathinaikos on a three-year contract. The move followed his performances in AaB's 2013–14 domestic double-winning campaign. His transfer was reportedly facilitated by former Panathinaikos player René Henriksen, who recommended Thelander to the club's management.

After missing the start of the 2015–16 season due to injury, Thelander made his debut on 23 September 2015 against Levadiakos. He scored his first goal for Panathinaikos in his third appearance, heading in the decisive goal in a 1–0 win over Skoda Xanthi on 3 October 2015. He became a regular starter in central defense but was sidelined for several weeks in late 2015 with injuries, including a knee problem. After returning in January 2016, Thelander completed the season with 21 appearances across all competitions, scoring once, as Panathinaikos finished second in the league.

Thelander's 2016–17 season was disrupted by further injuries, limiting him to eight league appearances. Changes in management and increased competition for places further restricted his playing time.

Amid financial difficulties at Panathinaikos, Thelander and several teammates, including Michael Essien, Jens Wemmer and Niklas Hult, went unpaid for extended periods. In July 2017, he filed an appeal to the Hellenic Football Federation's financial disputes committee, seeking approximately €510,000 in unpaid wages and compensation. The committee ruled partly in his favour, awarding him €450,000. To avoid further sanctions, Panathinaikos later reached a settlement with Thelander in late 2017, agreeing to pay the awarded amount in installments.

=== Zürich ===
On 15 August 2017, Thelander signed a two-year contract with Swiss Super League club Zürich. He was brought in to strengthen the club's defence following their promotion to the top flight. He made his competitive debut for the club on 16 September, starting in a 3–0 Swiss Cup win over FC Bassersdorf. His league debut followed four days later, starting in a 1–1 away draw against Lausanne-Sport. During the 2017–18 Swiss Super League season, Thelander established himself as a regular starter, making 22 league appearances. He also featured prominently in the Swiss Cup, scoring one goal in three matches.

Thelander contributed to Zürich's 2017–18 Swiss Cup triumph, starting in the final as the club defeated BSC Young Boys 2–1. In the final, he made a crucial goal-line clearance with Zürich leading 1–0 and was subsequently named Man of the Match for his performance.

=== Vitesse ===
On 17 May 2018, it was announced that Thelander would join Dutch side Vitesse on a three-year deal in July 2018. On 26 July, he made his first appearance for Vitesse, starting in the first leg of their UEFA Europa League qualification round against Viitorul Constanța. On 23 August, news broke that Thelander had broken his ankle, keeping him off the field for some months. However, due to a quick recovery, he made his comeback in the first team on 3 November in a 1–0 loss against PSV Eindhoven. He made just 13 appearances in his sole season in Arnhem.

=== Return to AaB ===
On 22 August 2019, Rasmus Thelander returned to AaB, signing a three-year contract with the club he had left in 2015. He made his return debut on 26 August in a Superliga match against AC Horsens, coming on as a substitute for Kasper Pedersen in a 5–0 away victory. Upon rejoining, Thelander expressed his joy at coming back "home" to Aalborg, stating: "First and foremost, I am incredibly happy that it was possible to come home—and when I say home, I truly mean home; AaB and Aalborg is home for me."

Thelander quickly re-established himself in AaB's defense. On 11 September 2019, he scored his first goal after rejoining the club, heading in the second goal of an 8–0 win over Nørresundby FB in the Danish Cup. That season he helped AaB reach the 2019–20 Danish Cup final, playing the full match as AaB finished runners-up after a 2–0 loss to SønderjyskE in the final held in Esbjerg. In league play, Thelander was a regular starter and opened his scoring account in the Superliga on 26 June 2020, netting the opener in a 4–1 away win against AGF. By the end of the 2019–20 campaign, he had made his 100th appearance for AaB (across both spells) during a 2–1 victory over Midtjylland on the final day of the season.

Thelander remained a key figure for AaB over the following two seasons, anchoring the back line and occasionally contributing goals. He scored three times in the 2021–22 Superliga—a career-high for a single league season—as AaB earned a top-six finish that year. In total, Thelander made 74 Superliga appearances and scored five goals in his second spell at AaB

=== Ferencváros ===
On 23 May 2022, Thelander joined defending Hungarian champions Ferencváros. He made his competitive debut on 27 July 2022, coming on as a late substitute in a 4–1 away victory over Slovan Bratislava in the UEFA Champions League second qualifying round. Over the following months, he also featured in domestic competitions, including three Nemzeti Bajnokság I league matches and one cup tie for Ferencváros.

However, Thelander's stint in Budapest was cut short. Citing family reasons, he requested an early release, and on 18 November 2022 Ferencváros agreed to terminate his contract by mutual consent. Reflecting on his time at the club and his departure, Thelander stated, "Ferencváros is a big club... It was special to work in such a high-level football environment... I am grateful to the club for accepting my request." He left having made seven competitive appearances for Ferencváros, scoring no goals.

=== Third spell at AaB ===
On 18 November 2022, Thelander returned to AaB for a third spell, signing a four-year contract with the Danish club after leaving Ferencváros. The move brought the 31-year-old defender back to the team where he had made 157 appearances in prior stints. He made his comeback debut as a starter in AaB's first match after the winter break, a 1–0 home defeat to AGF in February 2023.

Despite Thelander's mid-season arrival, AaB endured a difficult 2022–23 campaign and were relegated from the Superliga in June 2023—the club's first relegation in 36 years. Thelander remained with AaB in the second-tier 1st Division and became a key figure in the 2023–24 promotion push. He made 28 league appearances that season and scored five goals, notably netting his first goals since rejoining with a brace of headers in a 4–0 victory over Fredericia in August 2023. In March 2024, Thelander—by then captaining the side—scored another header in a crucial 3–2 away win at Fredericia that helped AaB reclaim first place and ultimately secure promotion back to the Superliga.

Back in the top flight for the 2024–25 season, Thelander's role diminished under new head coach Menno van Dam. He was replaced as club captain ahead of the new season by Mathias Jørgensen. On 1 September 2024, with two years remaining on his deal, AaB announced that Thelander's contract had been terminated by mutual agreement. The club's sporting director, James Gow, praised Thelander's immense contribution—highlighting his influence in winning promotion—but acknowledged that they could not offer him the playing time he desired going forward. Reflecting on the departure, Thelander admitted: "It is no secret that I had thought it was at AaB I would finish my career, but as so many times before the football world is unpredictable, and therefore I now look forward to a new and exciting challenge."

=== Silkeborg ===
On the same day that he had his contract with AaB terminated, 1 September 2024, it was confirmed that Thelander had signed with fellow Danish Superliga club Silkeborg until the end of the year. On 15 September, Thelander made his debut for the club in a 1–1 away draw against AGF in the Superliga. On 18 December, after nine appearances in the league and three in the Danish Cup, Silkeborg announced that Thelander's contract would not be extended and he would be released by the club.

=== Lyngby ===
On 3 February 2025, on transfer deadline day, Danish Superliga side Lyngby announced the signing of Thelander on a deal until June 2026. On 9 March, he scored his first goal for the club in a 1–0 away win against Silkeborg in the Superliga.

=== Omonia Aradippou ===
After just some months in Lyngby and with a relegation on top of that, he moved to Cyprus to play for Cypriot First Division club Omonia Aradippou.

== International career ==
Thelander has represented Denmark at the under-18, under-19 and under-20 levels, earning one cap in each category between 2009 and 2012. All three of his youth international appearances came in friendly matches, including a 2012 under-20 fixture against Italy in which Denmark lost 3–1.

== Style of play ==
Thelander is a tall and physically strong centre-back, known for his aerial ability and tenacious style of play. Allan Gaarde, former sporting director of AaB, described Thelander as a defender with a "huge fighting heart" and excellent heading ability both defensively and offensively. He has also shown leadership qualities, later captaining the side as they won promotion to the Danish Superliga in 2024. These attributes have made Thelander a commanding presence in defence, particularly effective in air duels and set-piece situations.

== Career statistics ==
As of match played 7 March 2026

Appearances and goals by club, season and competition
Club	Season	League			Cup		Europe		Other		Total	
Club	Season	Division	Apps	Goals	Apps	Goals	Apps	Goals	Apps	Goals	Apps	Goals
AB	2009–10	Danish 1st Division	2	0	1	0	—		—		3	0
AB	2010–11	Danish 1st Division	16	1	0	0	—		—		16	1
AB	2011–12	Danish 1st Division	23	2	1	0	—		—		24	2
AB	Total		41	3	2	0	—		—		43	3
AaB	2012–13	Danish Superliga	11	1	2	0	—		—		13	1
AaB	2013–14	Danish Superliga	26	1	4	2	2 (Note: Appearance(s) in UEFA Europa League)	0	—		32	3
AaB	2014–15	Danish Superliga	16	0	2	0	12 (Note: Four appearances in UEFA Champions League, eight in UEFA Europa League)	0	—		30	0
AaB	Total		53	2	8	2	14	0	—		75	4
Panathinaikos	2015–16	Super League Greece	18	1	3	0	0	0	—		21	1
Panathinaikos	2016–17	Super League Greece	8	0	2	0	0	0	—		10	0
Panathinaikos	Total		26	1	5	0	0	0	—		31	1
Zürich	2017–18	Swiss Super League	22	0	4	1	—		—		26	1
Vitesse	2018–19	Eredivisie	9	0	1	0	3	0	—		13	0
AaB	2019–20	Danish Superliga	20	1	4	1	—		—		24	2
AaB	2020–21	Danish Superliga	27	1	1	0	—		—		28	1
AaB	2021–22	Danish Superliga	27	3	2	0	—		—		29	3
AaB	Total		74	5	7	1	—		—		81	6
Ferencvárosi	2022–23	NB I	3	0	1	0	3 (Note: Appearances in UEFA Champions League)	0	—		7	0
AaB	2022–23	Danish Superliga	11	0	4	0	—		—		15	0
AaB	2023–24	Danish 1st Division	28	5	2	0	—		—		30	5
AaB	2024–25	Danish Superliga	1	0	0	0	—		—		1	0
AaB	Total		40	5	6	0	—		—		46	5
Silkeborg	2024–25	Danish Superliga	9	0	3	0	—		—		12	0
Lyngby	2024–25	Danish Superliga	12	1	—		—		—		12	1
Omonia Aradippou	2025–26	Cypriot First Division	20	2	0	0	—		—		20	2
Career total			309	19	37	4	20	0	0	0	366	23

== Honours ==
AaB

- Danish Superliga: 2013–14
- Danish Cup: 2014

FC Zürich

- Swiss Cup: 2017–18

Individual

- Danish Cup Fighter of the Year (årets pokalfighter): 2014
