= Jens-Kristian Sørensen =

Danish footballer (born 1987)

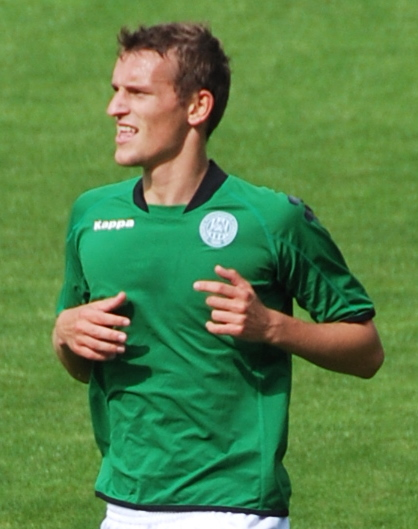

Personal information
- Full name: Jens-Kristian Selvejer Sørensen
- Date of birth: 21 March 1987 (age 39)
- Place of birth: Aalborg, Denmark
- Height: 1.88 m (6 ft 2 in)
- Position: Defender

Youth career
- Biersted IF
- AaB

Senior career*
Years	Team	Apps	(Gls)
2005–2011	AaB	43	(1)
2011–2013	Viborg FF	23	(1)
2013–2017	Vendsyssel FF	110	(10)

International career
2006	Denmark U20	1	(0)
2007	Denmark U21	3	(0)
- * Club domestic league appearances and goals as of 20 July 2013

Jens-Kristian Selvejer Sørensen (born 21 March 1987) is a retired Danish professional footballer who played as a defender.

Sørensen grew up in the small village of Biersted, and was nicknamed Farmer as a joke, because Biersted it is so small it almost isn't a village but rather a place. He is known for his physical strength and good heading abilities. He was due to make his first youth international appearance for Denmark, when called up to the Danish u-20 side for the 2006 Milk Cup in Northern Ireland, but an injury forced him to withdraw from the team, making way for AaB teammate Lasse Nielsen.

On 4 October 2006 Sørensen made his senior debut for AaB, when they faced FC Nordsjælland at Farum Park.

Sørensen joined Viborg FF in August 2011.
