= Allan Kuhn =

Danish football coach and former footballer (born 1968)

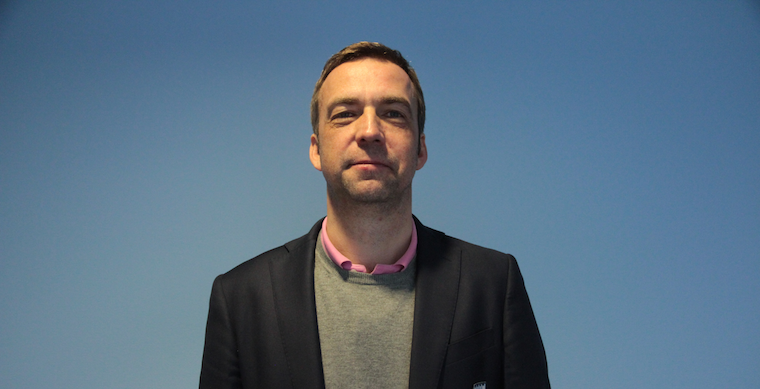

Personal information
- Full name: Allan Hjortdal Kuhn
- Date of birth: 2 March 1968 (age 58)
- Place of birth: Bornholm, Denmark
- Position: Midfielder

Senior career*
Years	Team	Apps	(Gls)
1987	Rønne IK		
1987–1988	Lyngby		
1988–1989	B 1903		
1990–1997	Lyngby		
1997–2000	Örgryte IS		
2001–2002	Hvidovre IF		

International career
1985	Denmark U-19	5	(2)

Managerial career
- 2002–2003: FC Bornholm
- 2004–2009: Aalborg BK (assistant)
- 2008: Aalborg BK (caretaker)
- 2009–2011: FC Midtjylland
- 2011: Randers FC (assistant)
- 2011–2016: Aalborg BK (assistant)
- 2016: Malmö FF
- 2018–2019: Hobro IK
- * Club domestic league appearances and goals

Allan Hjortdal Kuhn (born 2 March 1968), known simply as Allan Kuhn, is a Danish association football coach and former player. He most recently was the manager of Danish Superliga club Hobro IK. Before that he was head coach of Swedish club Malmö FF in 2016, where he won the domestic league during his sole season. He was the head coach of FC Midtjylland from 2009 to 2011. He is also a former assistant coach and caretaker head coach of Aalborg BK, and was the assistant of head coach Erik Hamrén in the 2008 Superliga-winning season, as well as assistant of Kent Nielsen in the 2014 Superliga-winning season.

In his active career, Kuhn was known as a hard-working attacking midfielder. He played a total 204 games for Lyngby Boldklub, winning the 1990 Danish Cup trophy and the 1992 Superliga championship with the club. He also played for Danish clubs Boldklubben 1903 and Hvidovre IF, and won the 2000 Swedish Cup with Örgryte IS. He represented the Denmark national under-19 football team five times.

== Playing career ==
Born on Bornholm, Kuhn started his playing career with local team Rønne IK. While at Rønne IK, he made his international debut as a forward when he played five games and scored two goals for the Denmark national under-19 football team in 1985. He got his senior debut for Rønne IK in 1987, and was soon off to Copenhagen club Lyngby Boldklub in the Danish 1st Division. He also played for 1st Division rivals Boldklubben 1903, before getting his national breakthrough when he moved back to Lyngby BK in 1990, playing alongside his older brother Hasse Kuhn.

=== Lyngby Boldklub ===
During his second stint with Lyngby, he helped the team win the 1990 Danish Cup against AGF. He did not score in the 6–1 final win, but was hailed as one of the best players of the game, alongside later Danish international midfielders Morten Wieghorst and Peter Nielsen. In a September 1990 game against Vejle Boldklub, Allan was sent off when he pushed a Vejle player who had elbowed and knocked out several of Hasse Kuhn's teeth without any reprimand from the referee. Allan underwent surgery in the summer 1991 to mend a right knee injury, and only played six of 32 games as Lyngby won the 1991–92 Superliga championship under manager Kent Karlsson.

During the reign of new Lyngby manager Michael Schäfer, Kuhn eventually moved into the position of attacking midfielder, a hard-working player with good dribbling. In the following seasons, Lyngby settled in the lower half of the league. In the last game of the 1994–95 Superliga season in June 1995, Kuhn suffered a rash tackle by Danish international defender Jacob Laursen, resulting in a left knee injury with an anticipated one-year recovery time. He returned to the Lyngby side in April 1996, and played seven of 33 games as Lyngby finished fourth in the 1995–96 Superliga season under new manager Benny Lennartsson. As he had a hard time forcing his way into Lennartsson's starting line-up, Kuhn sought to leave the club in the summer 1997. He played a total 204 games and scored 25 goals for the club in all competitions for Lyngby BK.

=== Örgryte IS ===
In July 1997, Kuhn moved abroad to play for Swedish club Örgryte IS, under manager Kalle Björklund. He started well in the last half of the 1997 Allsvenskan season, but only played few minutes in the first half of the 1998 Allsvenskan season, under new manager Bo Backman. He stated he wanted to leave Örgryte in June 1998, but returned to the starting line-up shortly thereafter and scored his first Allsvenskan goal in August 1998. Under new head coach Erik Hamrén, Kuhn emerged as somewhat of a father figure in Örgryte, working hard and encouraging his teammates with good humour, and he was named team captain. He won the 2000 Swedish Cup with the club. In September 2000, Kuhn agreed a move to Danish club Hvidovre IF at the end of the 2000 Allsvenskan season.

He joined Hvidovre in the Danish 1st Division in January 2001, and was named team captain. However, he did not start out strong for his new team, and was soon dropped from the starting line-up by manager Jan Sørensen. He was put on the transfer list, but was not sold and went on to play a number of additional games for Hvidovre, before he left the club in the summer 2002.

== Managerial career ==
During his injury lay-off from 1995 to 1996, Kuhn began youth team coaching, and undertook coaching courses. Allan Kuhn began his career as head coach in Denmark Series club FC Bornholm in the summer 2002.

=== Aalborg BK ===
He went on to coaching in the Superliga with Aalborg BK (AaB) in January 2004, as he was appointed the assistant of new head coach Erik Hamrén, whom Kuhn knew from his days at Örgryte. Under Kuhn and Hamrén, AaB won the 2007–08 Superliga championship. During his time at AaB, he was praised for his set piece coaching, which AaB goalkeeper Karim Zaza credited as a main factor in the aggregate 6–1 win against Deportivo de La Coruña in the 2008-09 UEFA Cup.

In the fall of 2008, Allan Kuhn was appointed caretaker head coach for AaB, after new head coach Bruce Rioch was sacked on 23 October 2008. In this period, Kuhn guided the team to a third-place finish in the 2008–09 UEFA Champions League group E, ahead of Celtic, through a series of successful matches including a win over Celtic and a tie with Manchester United on Old Trafford. He also led AaB from 11th to 6th place in the league, as he was undefeated in his seven Superliga games as head coach.

Kuhn expressed the desire to continue as AaB head coach, but AaB sports director Lynge Jakobsen saw a risk in the transition in role from assistant to head coach, as the players were too used to see Kuhn in the assistant role. From January 2009, he returned to his old position as assistant coach, now with Magnus Pehrsson as new AaB head coach. It was later revealed, that Kuhn engaged in advanced talks to replace Ove Christensen as head coach at Superliga rivals Vejle Boldklub, but eventually declined the offer.

=== FC Midtjylland ===
In August 2009, Kuhn was named new head coach at Superliga rivals FC Midtjylland (FCM). He replaced Thomas Thomasberg as head coach, who was fired following four points in the first four games of the 2009-10 Danish Superliga season. FCM lost the first four games of Kuhn's reign, but rallied to eventually finish the season in fifth place. In the 2010-11 Danish Superliga, FCM was second placed following the first half of the season.

In the 2010 winter break, FCM sports director Jens Ørgaard decided that all FCM teams should play the same offensive possession-based game, from youth teams to the Superliga team, in order to ease the integration of youth players into the first team squad. In March and April 2011, FCM went five games without winning. Kuhn announced his decision to leave the club prematurely on 15 April 2011, as he found the work load of a head coach was incompatible with his family life.

On 26 April 2011, he was contracted as an assistant coach of Superliga rivals Randers FC for the remainder of the 2010–11 season, working under new head coach Peter Elstrup.

=== Back to Aalborg BK ===
From 2011 to 2016 he was once again the assistant coach of AaB, and was part of the 2014 Double Winning AaB-team which won both the Danish Superliga and the Danish Cup.

=== Malmö FF ===
On 8 January 2016, Kuhn was announced as the head coach for Swedish Malmö FF. He replaced Åge Hareide, who took Malmö FF to two straight UEFA Champions League group stages before leaving to be manager of Denmark national football team. On 26 October 2016 the Swedish league title was secured after a 3–0 victory away to Falkenberg. Despite the league title, Malmö FF decided to part ways with Kuhn.

=== Hobro IK ===
In June 2018 it was revealed that Kuhn would become new manager of Danish Superliga team Hobro IK. Hobro struggled during most of the first half of the season, and on 21 February 2019 Kuhn was sacked.

== Honours ==
=== Playing career ===
Lyngby

- 1990 Danish Cup
- 1992 Danish Superliga

Örgryte IS

- 2000 Swedish Cup

=== Coaching career ===
Aalborg

- 2008 Danish Superliga (as assistant coach)
- 2014 Danish Superliga (as assistant coach)
- 2014 Danish Cup (as assistant coach)

Malmö FF

- 2016 Allsvenskan
