= Daniel Christensen =

Danish footballer (born 1988)

Personal information
- Date of birth: 19 September 1988 (age 38)
- Place of birth: Aalborg, Denmark
- Height: 1.72 m (5 ft 8 in)
- Position: Left-back

Youth career
- AaB

Senior career*
Years	Team	Apps	(Gls)
2008–2011	AaB	28	(0)
2011–2014	SønderjyskE	93	(2)
2014–2016	AGF	70	(1)
2016–2018	Westerlo	42	(2)
2018–2020	Vendsyssel	29	(0)
Total		262	(5)
- * Club domestic league appearances and goals

Daniel Christensen (born 19 September 1988) is a Danish former professional footballer who played as a left-back.

== Career ==
He made his debut in the Superliga for AaB on 23 April 2009 in an away match against Esbjerg fB. The game ended in a 3–1 defeat for AaB, with Christensen coming on in the 65th minute for Patrick Kristensen. In 2016, Christensen was signed by Westerlo of the Belgian First Division A.

On 29 July 2020 it was confirmed, that 31-year old Christensen had decided to retire and focus on his job as a real estate agent.
