= Lasse Nielsen (footballer, born 1988) =

Danish footballer (born 1988)

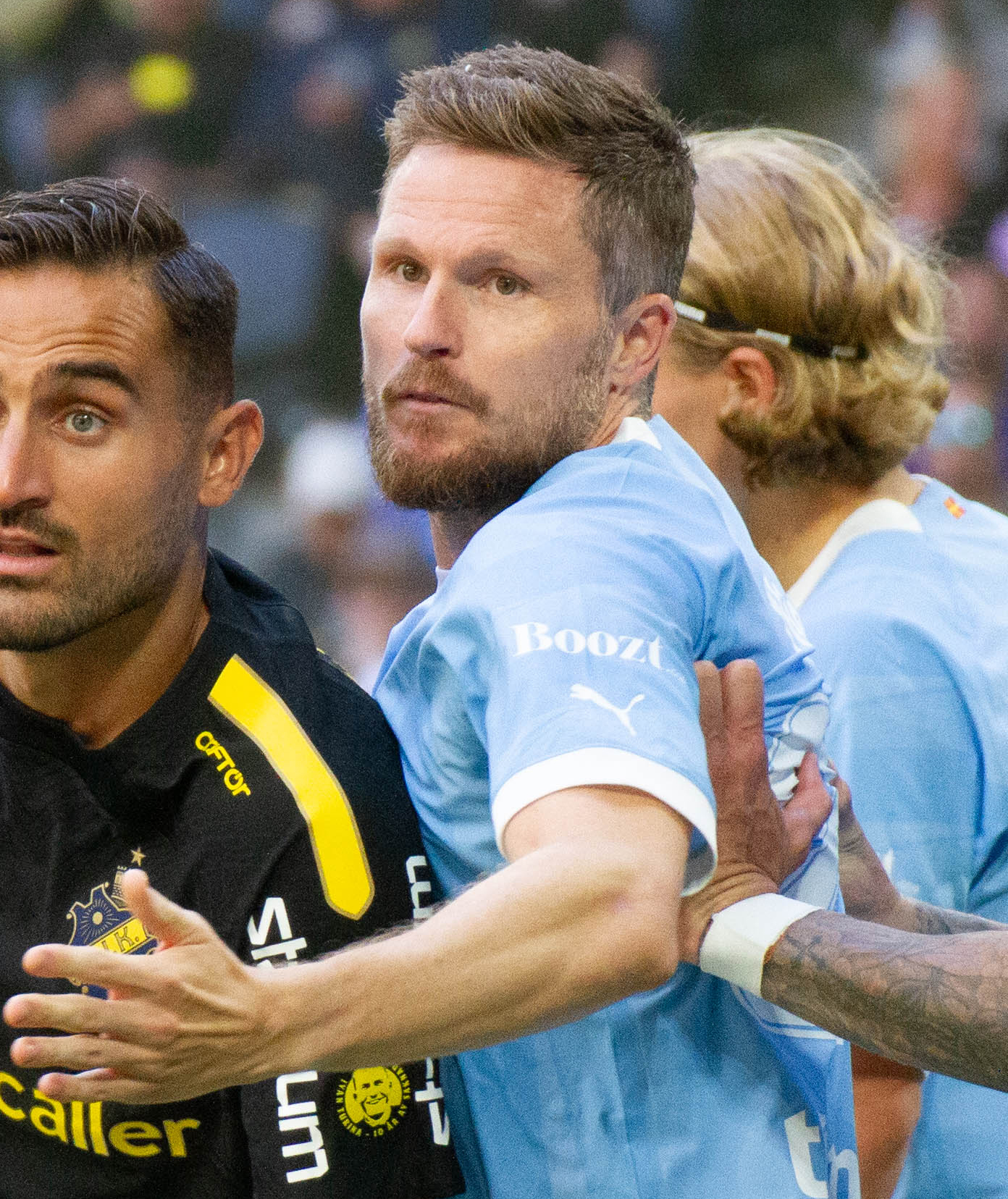
- Nielsen playing for Malmö FF in 2023

Personal information
- Full name: Lasse Ladegaard Nielsen
- Date of birth: 8 January 1988 (age 38)
- Place of birth: Aalborg, Denmark
- Height: 1.85 m (6 ft 1 in)
- Position: Centre back

Team information
- Current team: Vejle
- Number: 4

Youth career
- AaB

Senior career*
Years	Team	Apps	(Gls)
2006–2014	AaB	158	(10)
2014–2015	NEC	13	(1)
2014–2015	→ Gent (loan)	26	(2)
2015–2017	Gent	56	(0)
2017–2023	Malmö FF	137	(3)
2023–2025	Göztepe	46	(2)
2025–	Vejle	27	(0)

International career^{‡}
2006–2007	Denmark U20	6	(1)
2007	Denmark U19	3	(0)
2009–2011	Denmark U21	12	(1)
2012	Denmark	1	(0)
2012–	Denmark League XI	3	(0)
- * Club domestic league appearances and goals as of 19 May 2026 ‡ National team caps and goals as of 21 March 2013

Lasse Ladegaard Nielsen (born 8 January 1988) is a Danish professional footballer who plays a centre back for Danish club Vejle. He formerly played for AaB, NEC, Gent, Malmö FF and Göztepe. He has won one cap for the Denmark national team.

== Career statistics ==
=== Club ===
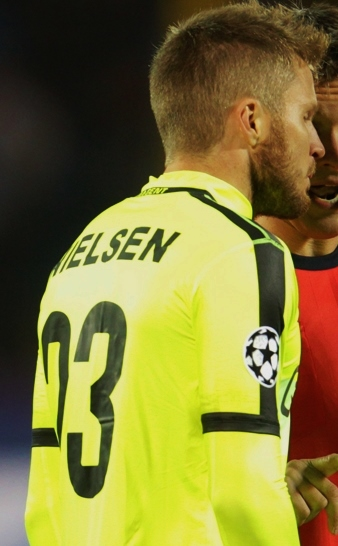
Nielsen playing for K.A.A. Gent in 2015.

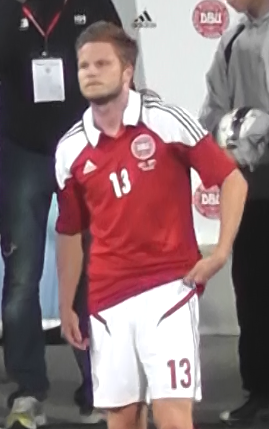
Nielsen playing for Denmark.

As of 8 December 2021

Club	Season	League			Cup		Continental		Total	
Club	Season	Division	Apps	Goals	Apps	Goals	Apps	Goals	Apps	Goals
AaB	2006–07	Danish Superliga	1	0			—		1	0
AaB	2007–08	Danish Superliga	8	1			0	0	8	1
AaB	2008–09	Danish Superliga	22	1			5	0	27	1
AaB	2009–10	Danish Superliga	26	2			3	0	29	2
AaB	2010–11	Danish Superliga	27	1	1	0	—		28	1
AaB	2011–12	Danish Superliga	29	2	0	0	—		29	2
AaB	2012–13	Danish Superliga	28	3	1	0	—		29	3
AaB	2013–14	Danish Superliga	17	0	0	0	2	0	19	0
AaB	Total		158	10	2	0	10	0	170	10
NEC	2013–14	Eredivisie	13	1	1	0	—		14	1
NEC	Total		13	1	1	0	0	0	14	1
Gent	2014–15	Belgian Pro League	26	2	4	0	—		30	2
Gent	2015–16	Belgian Pro League	38	0	5	0	8	0	51	0
Gent	2016–17	Belgian Pro League	18	0	3	0	8	0	29	0
Gent	Total		82	2	12	0	16	0	110	2
Malmö FF	2017	Allsvenskan	25	1	1	0	2	0	28	1
Malmö FF	2018	Allsvenskan	27	0	7	1	14	0	48	1
Malmö FF	2019	Allsvenskan	10	0	4	1	13	0	27	1
Malmö FF	2020	Allsvenskan	15	1	4	1	3	0	22	2
Malmö FF	2021	Allsvenskan	20	1	2	0	12	0	34	1
Malmö FF	Total		97	3	18	3	44	0	159	6
Career Total			350	16	33	3	70	0	453	19

== Honours ==
AaB

- Danish Superliga: 2013–14
- Danish Cup: 2013–14

Gent

- Belgian Pro League: 2014–15
- Belgian Super Cup: 2015

Malmö FF

- Allsvenskan: 2017, 2020, 2021, 2023
- Svenska Cupen: 2021–22
