= Lynge Jakobsen =

Danish footballer and sports director (born 1950)

Personal information
- Full name: Lynge Jakobsen
- Date of birth: 10 November 1950 (age 75)
- Place of birth: Aalborg, Denmark
- Position: Midfielder

Youth career
- 1969–1972: Aalborg BK (AaB)

Senior career*
Years	Team	Apps	(Gls)
1973–1979	Aalborg BK (AaB)	267	(18)

International career
	Denmark U-19	6	(5)
	Denmark U-21	2	(0)

Managerial career
- Storvorde Sejflod BK
- Lindholm IF
- Aalborg BK (reserves)
- –1994: Aalborg Chang
- 1994–1996: Aars IK
- 1996–2013: Aalborg BK (AaB) (Sports director)
- * Club domestic league appearances and goals

Lynge Jakobsen (born 10 November 1950) is a Danish former football player and sports director of the professional football club Aalborg BK (AaB), who competes in the best Danish league the Danish Superliga. Aalborg BK won the 2007-08 season and 2013-14 with Jakobsen as sports director.

== Playing career ==
Lynge Jakobsen played his first game for Aalborg BK on 27 May 1969, after more than 4 years he was ready to play at Aalborg BK's first team in 1973. In his playing career Lynge Jakobsen played 267 games for Aalborg BK. In 1978 Lynge Jakobsen signed a contract with Aalborg BK as the first professional player in the history of the club. Lynge Jakobsen played his last game for Aalborg BK on 29 October 1979.

Among AaB fans, he goes under the name of "Gud"(God)

== Education and job career ==
Lynge Jakobsen received training to become a merchant with the Thorndahl company, an enterprise specializing in the sale of corn. Jakobsen, at one point, also worked as a head of a municipality department for the Aalborg Municipality, before he took up the position as sports director with Aalborg BK.

== Management career ==
Following his playing career Lynge Jakobsen was a head coach for different minor Danish clubs around Aalborg: Aalborg Chang, Lindholm IF, Aars and Storvorde. In 1996 Lynge Jakobsen started his full-time management career, when he became sports director for Aalborg BK. Jakobsen was sports director for almost 17 years.
