= Aalborg Stadium =

Football stadium in Aalborg, Denmark

Aalborg Park
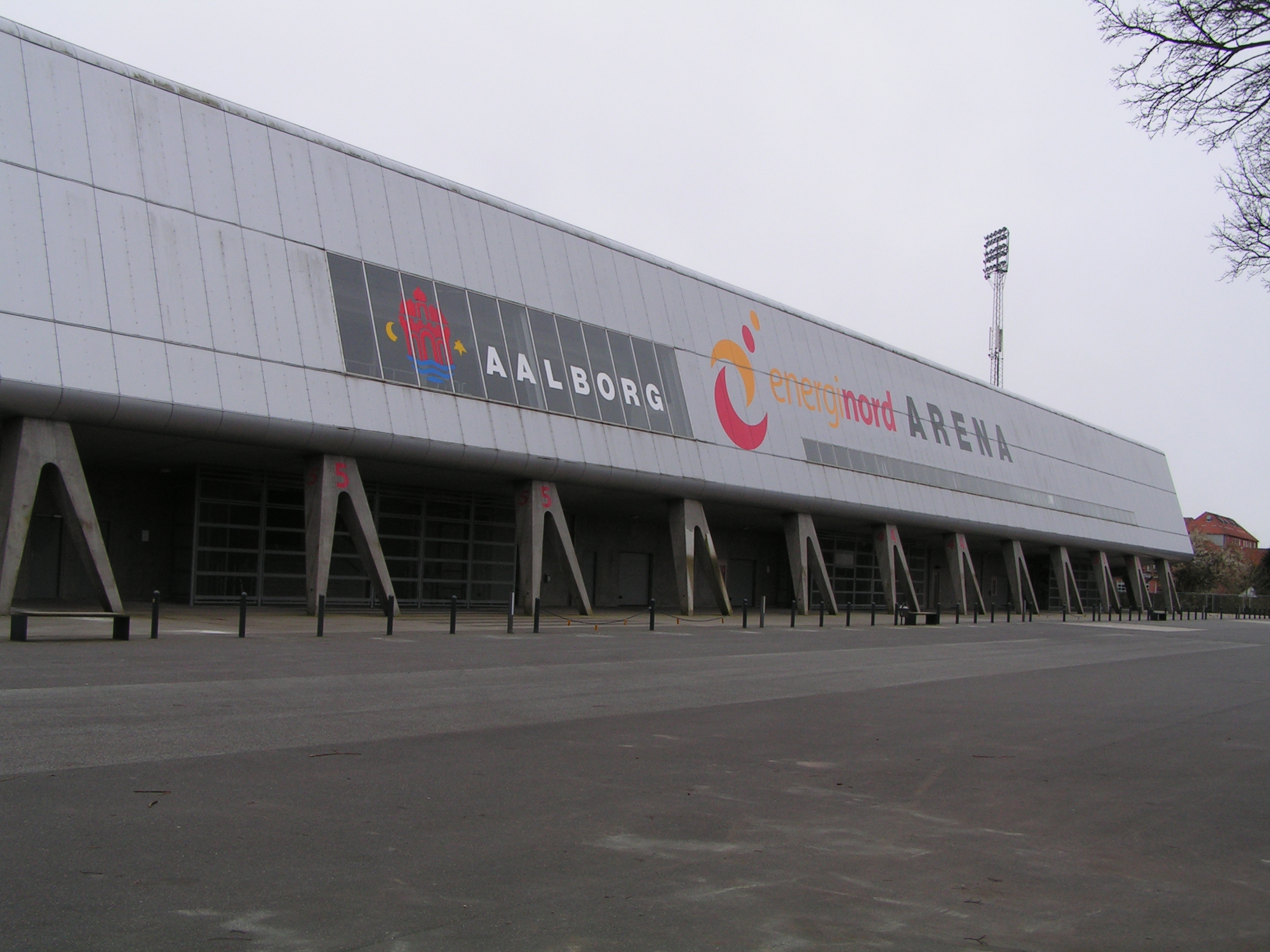
- Interactive map of Aalborg Park
- Location: Harald Jensens Vej 9; 9000 Aalborg
- Coordinates: 57°03′07″N 9°53′55″E
- Owner: Aalborg Municipality
- Capacity: 13,600 (8,997 seats) (Danish matches); 10,500 (International matches)
- Surface: Grass
- Record attendance: 21,198 (AaB vs. KB, 1969)
- Field size: 105 x 70 m

Construction
- Opened: 1920
- Renovated: 2002 & 1960
- Expanded: 2002 & 1960
- Cost: DKK 98,000,000
- Architect: Friis & Moltke

Tenants
- AaB (1960–present); Denmark national under-21 football team (2006–present)

Aalborg Stadium (Danish: Aalborg Stadion) is a football stadium located in Aalborg, Denmark. It is the home ground of AaB. It has a capacity of 14,135 of which 8,997 is seated. The capacity is 10,500 for international matches.

The stadium consists of 4 stands:

- Two long-side stands:
  - The Complea stand (4,981 seats)
  - The A. Enggaard stand (2,720 seats)
- Two end stands:
  - The Spar Nord stand (4,000 standing places)
  - The 3F stand (1,296 seats and 1000 standing places)

== National games ==
Aalborg Park has six times been used as home ground for the Danish national team, and is supposed to be the venue for the friendly match against Senegal on 27 May 2010. Further it has been venue of several youth and female national matches:

Date	Home team	Res.	Away team	Competition	Spectators
13 September 1953	Denmark U-21	4–1	Norway U-21	Friendly match	11,336
16 September 1956	Denmark B	3–0	Finland B	Friendly match	15,250
13 September 1959	Denmark B	1–1	Norway B	Friendly match	14,900
27 October 1962	Denmark B	3–1	Sweden B	Friendly match	14,300
26 October 1966	Denmark U-21	1–2	DDR U-21	Friendly match	4,000
25 September 1968	Denmark U-21	1–2	Netherlands U-21	Friendly match	4,600
1 July 1969	Denmark	6–0	Bermuda	Friendly match	12,200
12 May 1971	Denmark U-23	2–1	Portugal U-23	1972 UEFA European Under-23 Football Championship qualifying	6,500
1 August 1971	Denmark	3–2	England amateur	Friendly match	9,500
9 October 1974	Denmark	2–1	Iceland	Friendly match	6,200
26 October 1976	Denmark U-18	1–0	Northern Ireland U-18	1977 UEFA European Under-18 Football Championship qualifying	?
8 October 1977	Denmark U-21	1–2	Netherlands U-21	Friendly match	750
10 May 1979	Denmark amateur	1–1	Finland amateur	Unofficial match	2,600
25 October 1983	Denmark U-19	1–0	Finland U-19	1984 UEFA European Under-18 Football Championship qualifying	?
11 September 1984	Denmark U-21	0–1	Austria U-21	Friendly match	1,900
10 September 1985	Denmark U-21	3–0	Sweden U-21	Friendly match	1,350
10 June 1987	Denmark	8–0	Romania	1988 Summer Olympics qualifying	10,300
20 April 1988	Denmark	4–0	Greece	1988 Summer Olympics qualifying	9,800
4 September 1988	Denmark	3–2	Norway	1989 European Competition for Women's Football qualifying	1,200
12 April 1989	Denmark	2–0	Canada	Friendly match	10,400
13 November 1990	Denmark U-21	3–0	Yugoslavia U-21	1992 UEFA European Under-21 Football Championship qualifying	2,100
17 April 1991	Denmark U-21	7–0	San Marino U-21	1992 UEFA European Under-21 Football Championship qualifying	1,800
14 July 1991	Denmark	2–1	Italy	UEFA Women's Euro 1991	3,100
24 September 1991	Denmark U-21	0–2	Norway U-21	Friendly match	?
16 October 1991	Denmark	4–1	France	UEFA Women's Euro 1993 qualifying	300
11 March 1992	Denmark U-21	5–0	Poland U-21	1992 UEFA European Under-21 Football Championship	?
9 April 1992	Denmark U-21	0–1	Italy U-21	1992 UEFA European Under-21 Football Championship	?
9 September 2004	Denmark U-18	1–1	Slovakia U-18	Friendly match	500
26 September 2004	Denmark	6–0	Belgium	UEFA Women's Euro 2005 qualifying	2,137
6 June 2007	Denmark U-21	0–1	Finland U-21	2009 UEFA European Under-21 Football Championship qualifying	6,918
7 September 2007	Denmark U-21	4–0	Lithuania U-21	2009 UEFA European Under-21 Football Championship qualifying	4,843
20 November 2007	Denmark U-21	1–0	Slovenia U-21	2009 UEFA European Under-21 Football Championship qualifying	2,854
26 March 2008	Denmark U-21	0–1	Sweden U-21	Friendly match	344
9 September 2008	Denmark U-21	1–0	Scotland U-21	2009 UEFA European Under-21 Football Championship qualifying	3,659
11 October 2008	Denmark U-21	0–1	Serbia U-21	2009 UEFA European Under-21 Football Championship qualifying	4,551
19 November 2008	Denmark U-20	0–1	France U-20	Friendly match	344
5 June 2009	Denmark U-21	3–2	Iceland U-21	Friendly match	615
13 October 2009	Denmark U-21	3–1	Georgia U-21	Friendly match	2,150

== See also ==
- Aalborg Boldspilklub
- List of football stadiums in Denmark

Preceded by Stadion an der Bremer Brücke; Osnabrück	UEFA Women's Euro; Final Venue; 1991	Succeeded by Stadio Dino Manuzzi; Cesena
