= 2019–20 Brøndby IF season =

Brøndby
2019–20 season
- Sporting director/Director of football: Ebbe Sand until 10 July 2019; Carsten V. Jensen from 10 July 2019
- Head coach: Niels Frederiksen
- Stadium: Brøndby Stadium
- Danish Superliga: 4th
- Danish Cup: Fourth round
- UEFA Europa League: Third qualifying round
- Top goalscorer: League: Kamil Wilczek (17); All: Kamil Wilczek (20)
- Highest home attendance: 21,746 (vs. Copenhagen, Superliga, 6 October 2019)
- Lowest home attendance: 10,295 (vs. Inter Turku, Europa League, 11 July 2019)
Home colours	Away colours

2019–20 Brøndby IF season was Brøndby IF's 39th consecutive season in top-division of the Danish football league, the 30th consecutive in Danish Superliga, and the 54th as a football club. Besides the Superliga, the club competed in the 2019–20 Danish Cup and 2019–20 UEFA Europa League. It is the first season with head coach Niels Frederiksen, after replaced he caretaker manager Martin Retov.

== Club ==
=== First team staff ===
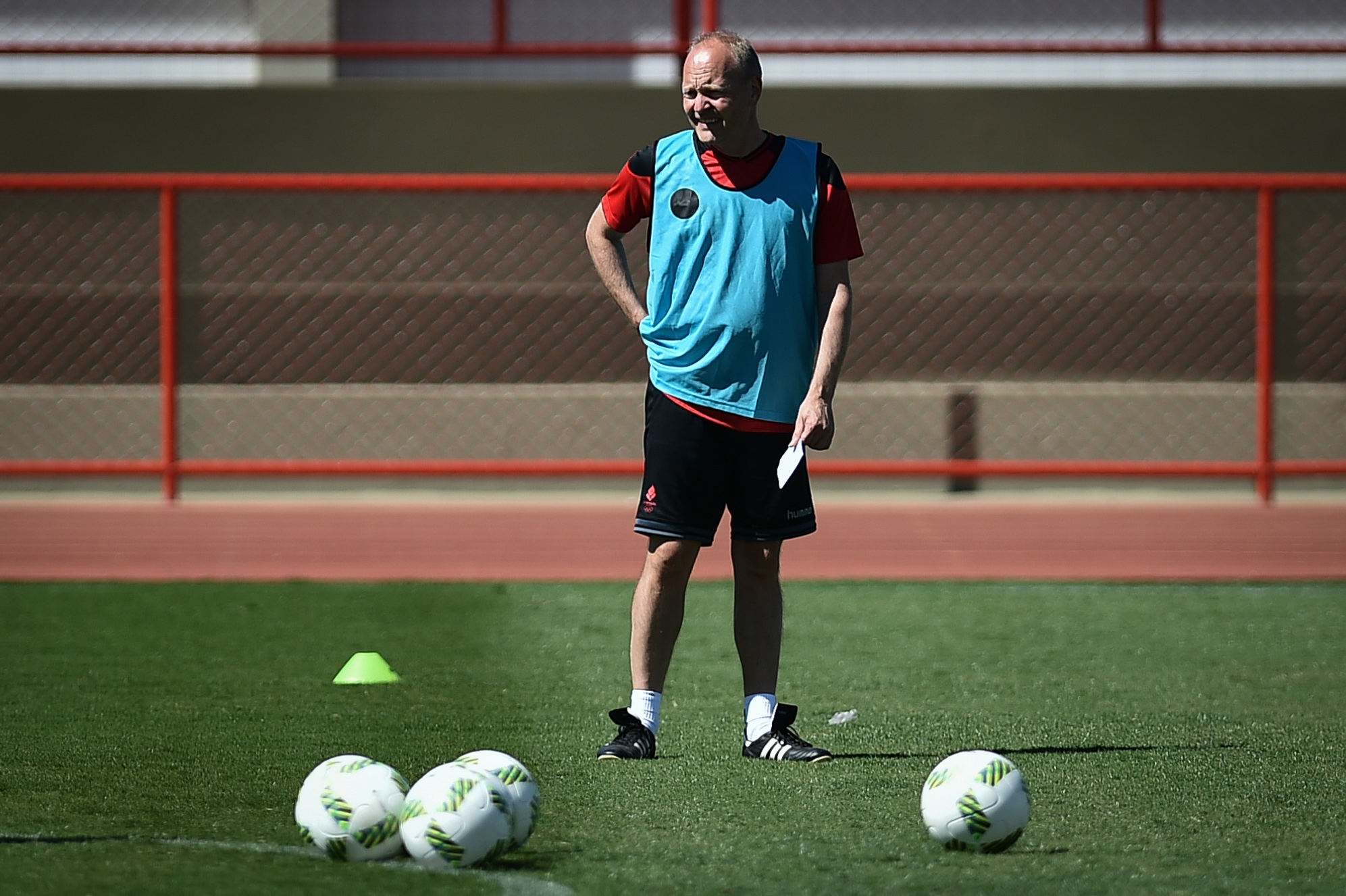
Brøndby IF's cheftræner Niels Frederiksen.

Position	Staff
Head coach	(Denmark) Niels Frederiksen
Assistant coach	(Denmark) Martin Retov
Assistant coach	(Denmark) Jesper Sørensen
Fitness coach	(United States) Ahron Thode
Goalkeeper coach	(Denmark) Lars Høgh
Goalkeeper coach	(Denmark) Claus Fallentin

Last updated: 20 August 2019.

=== Club administration ===
Position	Staff
Administrative director	(Denmark) Jesper Jørgensen until 10. juli
Administrative director	(Denmark) Ole Palmå from 10. juli
Sporting director	(Denmark) Ebbe Sand until 10. juli
Director of football	(Denmark) Carsten Vagn Jensen from 10. juli
Head of Recruitment	(Denmark) John Møller
Chief analyser	(Germany) Matthias Borst
Team manager	(Denmark) Thomas Andersen
Kitmanager	(Denmark) Leif Mortensen

Last updated: 20 August 2019.

=== Staff changes ===
1 July 2019 Brøndby announced that they had hired Niels Frederiksen as their new head coach, on a two-year contract. He joined the team after the 2019 UEFA European Under-21 Championship that same summer. Besides this Matthias Jaissle left the club, while caretaker Martin Retov, assumed his former position as assistant, along with new signing Jesper Sørensen. Besides this, Matthias Borst, Claus Fallentin, Lars Høgh and Ahron Thode all remained with the club.

The day before the first competitive game of the season, Brøndby IF announced that they had replaced CEO Jesper Jørgensen with the commercial director Ole Palmå. At the same time, it was announced that Ebbe Sand resigned from his job as sporting director after only six months in the job, as Carsten V. Jensen was hired as Executive Football Director, and Sand did not want another role in the staff of the club.

=== Goal of the season ===
In March 2019, the club updatede their "Strategi 6.4", which among other things meant the club changed the sporting goals, so as the club in this and next season should qualify for the championship playoff in the Superligaen, as to secure European qualification from 2021-22.

Ebbe Sand announced before the end of the previous season, that it was an objective of the club to slim the squad, and make it younger, i order for the clubs talents to make their breakthrough as senior players easier.

=== Stadium and attendance ===
On 13 July 2019, Brøndby IF announced that they had secured the Danish authorities permit to place a video surveillance system at Brøndby Stadium The technology should be used to recognize fans who had quarantine from the stadium, and was used the first time for the first home game of the season, against Silkeborg IF.

After the record for most season passes the previous season, the record for renewals were broken this season. 8,157 renewed their season pass, which equalled an increase of 27% compared to the year before.

=== Season ===
The season officially started with a VO2max-test on 19 June, and the first training session was on 20 June 2019. After this they played som friendlies, before the first competitive game on 11 July, against FC Inter Turku from Finland.

== Players ==
=== First team ===
Note: Flags indicate national team as defined under FIFA eligibility rules; some limited exceptions apply. Players may hold more than one non-FIFA nationality.

No.	Pos.	Nation	Player
1	GK	GER	Marvin Schwäbe
2	DF	DEN	Jens Martin Gammelby
3	DF	GER	Anthony Jung
5	MF	KOS	Besar Halimi
6	DF	ISL	Hjörtur Hermannsson
7	MF	GER	Dominik Kaiser
8	MF	DEN	Kasper Fisker
10	MF	GER	Hany Mukhtar
11	FW	DEN	Mikael Uhre
12	MF	SWE	Simon Tibbling
14	MF	DEN	Kevin Mensah
16	GK	DEN	Michael Tørnes
17	FW	DEN	Andreas Bruus
18	MF	DEN	Jesper Lindstrøm
19	MF	DEN	Morten Frendrup

No.	Pos.	Nation	Player
20	FW	POL	Kamil Wilczek
21	MF	DEN	Lasse Vigen Christensen
22	MF	CRO	Josip Radošević
23	DF	FIN	Paulus Arajuuri
24	DF	DEN	Joel Kabongo
25	DF	TTO	Luke Singh (loaned from Toronto FC until 31 December 2019)
27	MF	SWE	Simon Hedlund
28	DF	DEN	Anton Skipper Hendriksen
29	MF	DEN	Peter Bjur
30	GK	DEN	Mads Hermansen
42	MF	NOR	Tobias Børkeeiet
50	FW	CRO	Ante Erceg
—	DF	SVK	Gregor Sikosek (loaned to NK Domzale from 27 August 2018 until 31 December 2019)
—	MF	DEN	Rezan Corlu (loaned to Lyngby BK from 21 June 2019)

=== Transfers ===
==== In ====
No.	Pos	Player	Transfer form	Type	Date	Transferfee	Ref.
16	GK	(Denmark) Michael Tørnes	Vendsyssel FF	Transfer	3 June 2019		
18	MF	(Denmark) Jesper Lindstrøm	Masterclass	Own	3 June 2019		
29	MF	(Denmark) Peter Bjur	Masterclass	Own	3 June 2019		
30	GK	(Denmark) Mads Hermansen	Masterclass	Own	3 June 2019		
--	FW	(Denmark) Andreas Bruus	FC Roskilde	Loan ended	30 June 2019		
--	DF	(Denmark) Christian Enemark	HB Køge	Loan ended	30 June 2019		
--	MF	(Denmark) Rezan Corlu	AS Roma	Transfer	21 June 2019		
42	MF	(Norway) Tobias Børkeeiet	Stabæk Fotball	Transfer	5 July 2019		
Total						€ 1,300,000	

Updated: 6 July 2019 Source: brondby.com

==== Out ====
No.	Pos	Player	Transfer to	Type	Date	Transferfee	Ref
3	DF	(Germany) Benedikt Röcker	SV Wehen Wiesbaden	End of contract	30 June 2019		
16	GK	(Germany) Benjamin Bellot	BSG Chemie Leipzig	End of contract	30 June 2019		
18	FW	(Denmark) Nikolai Laursen	PSV Eindhoven	Loan ended	30 June 2019		
40	GK	(Denmark) Casper Hauervig	HB Køge	Transfer	30 June 2019		
--	DF	(Denmark) Christian Enemark	Næstved Boldklub	End of Contract	30 June 2019		
--	MF	(Denmark) Rezan Corlu	Lyngby BK	Loan	21 June 2019		
Total						€ 0	

Updated: 21 June 2019 Source: brondby.com

==== Brøndby Player of the Month ====
Brøndby Player of the Month is an monthly award, in which the fans decides who has been the best player in the last month. The fans can vote on three players picked by the club. The voting begins after the last game each month, and is done through Facebook

Month	No.	Pos	Player	Ref	Nominated	Ref
July	7	MF	(Germany) Dominik Kaiser		Kamil Wilczek; Anthony Jung	
August	7	MF	(Germany) Dominik Kaiser		Kamil Wilczek; Anthony Jung	
September	7	MF	(Germany) Dominik Kaiser		Andreas Maxsø; Josip Radosevic	
October			(N/A)			
November			(N/A)			
December			(N/A)			
February			(N/A)			
March			(N/A)			
April			(N/A)			
May			(N/A)			

== Pre-season ==
Win Draw Loss

22 June 2019	Albertslund	0–3	Brøndby	Albertslund
13:30	Wilczek 28'; Uhre 74'; Hedlund 75'	Report		Stadium: Albert Park

26 June 2019	(Poland) Lech Poznan	1–0	Brøndby	Opalenica, Poland
18:00	Puchacz 10'	Report		Stadium: Hotel Remes

29 June 2019	(Poland) Wisla Plock	1–1	Brøndby	Opalenica, Poland
16:00	Stevanovic 12'	Report	Uhre 84'	Stadium: Hotel Remes

6 July 2019	(Germany) Union Berlin	2–1	Brøndby	Berlin, Tyskland
15:30	Polter 63'; Mees 90'	Report	Arajuuri 82'	Stadium: Stadion An der Alten Försterei; Attendance: 12,307

== Competitions ==
=== Overview ===
Competition	Statistics							
Competition	P	W	D	L	GF	GA	GD	Win %
Superliga	36	16	8	12	56	42	+14	44.44
Danish Cup	2	1	0	1	3	3	+0	50.00
Europa League	6	2	0	4	12	13	−1	33.33
Total	44	19	8	17	71	58	+13	43.18

=== Superliga ===
==== Overview ====
Overall								Home						Away					
Pld	W	D	L	GF	GA	GD	Pts	W	D	L	GF	GA	GD	W	D	L	GF	GA	GD
36	16	8	12	56	42	+14	56	10	4	4	33	20	+13	6	4	8	23	22	+1

Last updated: 26 July 2020 Source: brondby.com

==== Regular season ====
Pos	Team	Pld	W	D	L	GF	GA	GD	Pts	Qualification
2	Copenhagen	26	18	2	6	47	29	+18	56	Qualification for the Championship round
3	AGF	26	14	5	7	42	28	+14	47	Qualification for the Championship round
4	Brøndby	26	13	3	10	47	37	+10	42	Qualification for the Championship round
5	Nordsjælland	26	12	5	9	48	35	+13	41	Qualification for the Championship round
6	AaB	26	11	5	10	44	33	+11	38	Qualification for the Championship round

Source: Danish Football Association (in Danish), Soccerway
Rules for classification: 1) Points; 2) Goal difference; 3) Goals scored; 4) Away goals scored; 5) Play-off (played on neutral ground if determining teams for different rounds); 6) Draw.

==== Championship round ====
Points and goals will carry over in full from the regular season.

Pos	Team	Pld	W	D	L	GF	GA	GD	Pts	
1	Midtjylland (X)	36	26	4	6	61	29	+32	82	Champions League second qualifying round
2	Copenhagen	36	21	5	10	58	42	+16	68	Europa League second qualifying round
3	AGF	36	19	7	10	58	41	+17	64	European play-off match
4	Brøndby	36	16	8	12	56	42	+14	56	
5	Nordsjælland	36	13	8	15	59	54	+5	47	
6	AaB	36	16	6	14	54	44	+10	54	

Updated to match(es) played on 26 July 2020. Source:
(X) Assured of a European play-off match, but may still qualify for Champions League qualification.

===== Matches =====
Brøndby IF's matches in the regular season of 2019–20.

Win Draw Loss

14 July 2019 1	Brøndby	3–0	Silkeborg	Brøndby
18:00	Arajuuri 14'; Kaiser 36'; Wilczek 74'	Report	Rochester Sørensen (yellow card) 72'	Stadium: Brøndby Stadion; Attendance: 13,056; Referee: Mads-Kristoffer Kristoffersen

21 July 2019 2	Randers	2–2	Brøndby	Randers
16:00	Riis 8'; Piesinger (yellow card) 51'; Graves Jensen (yellow card) 84'; Egho 90+5'	Report	Kaiser 9' (yellow card) 72'; Arajuuri (yellow card) 71' (yellow-red card) 90+4'; Uhre 90+2'	Stadium: Randers Stadion; Attendance: 5,984; Referee: Michael Tykgaard

28 July 2019 3	Brøndby	3–2	OB	Brøndby
18:00	Lindstrøm 25'; Kaiser (yellow card) 59'; Jung (yellow card) 67'; Wilczek 79', 88'	Report	Barrett Laursen 53'; Drachmann (yellow card) 47'; Kadrii 67' (str.); Lund (yellow card) 73'	Stadium: Brøndby Stadion; Attendance: 13,689; Referee: Peter Kjærsgaard

4 August 2019 4	Brøndby	1–2	Horsens	Brøndby
16:00	Wilczek 10' (yellow card) 86'; Arajuuri (yellow card) 41'; Jung (yellow card) 90'	Report	5' (yellow card) 17' Hansson; 60' (sm.) Arajuuri; (yellow card) 73' Lumb; (yellow card) 81' Thorsen	Stadium: Brøndby Stadion; Attendance: 15,145; Referee: Anders Poulsen

11 August 2019 5	Hobro	0–2	Brøndby	Hobro
18:00	(yellow card) 33' Sabbi	Report	Hjörtur Hermannsson (red card); Wilczek 52', 85'; Mensah (yellow card) 60'	Stadium: Hobro Stadion; Attendance: 4,186; Referee: Mads-Kristoffer Kristoffersen

18 August 2019 6	Brøndby	2–1	AaB	Brøndby
18:00	Radošević (yellow card) 14'; Kaiser 32'; Wilczek 49'	Report	Olsen 55'; Christensen (yellow card) 64'	Stadium: Brøndby Stadion; Attendance: 11,349; Referee: Jens Maae

25 August 2019 7	Brøndby	0–3	AGF	Brøndby
18:00	Børkeeiet (yellow card) 44'; Hermannsson (yellow card) 85'	Report	Amini (yellow card) 38'; Helenius (yellow card) 45+3'; Duncan (yellow card) 46'; Blume 57'; Ankersen 86'; Mortensen 90+3'	Stadium: Brøndby Stadion; Attendance: 14,145; Referee: Mads Kristoffersen

1 September 2019 8	Midtjylland	1–0	Brøndby	Herning
18:00	Skipper 7' (o.g.); Frank (yellow card) 25'; Mabil (yellow card) 31'	Report	Lindstrøm (yellow card) 10'	Stadium: MCH Arena; Attendance: 10,944; Referee: Jorgen Burchardt

15 September 2019 9	Brøndby	4–2	Nordsjælland	Brøndby
18:00	Kaiser 32'; Larsson (yellow card) 43'; Radošević 44'; Mukhtar 59'; Maxsø (yellow card) 71'; Wilczek 86' (pen.)	Report	Thychosen (yellow card) 39'; Francis 54'; Atanga 64'; Jenssen (yellow card) 85'	Stadium: Brøndby Stadion; Attendance: 14,648; Referee: Jakob Kehlet

22 September 2019 10	Esbjerg	3–1	Brøndby	Esbjerg
16:00	Petre 13'; Kauko 18'; Halsti (yellow card) 57'; Sørensen 71'	Report	Kaiser 37'; Lindstrøm (yellow card) 38'	Stadium: Blue Water Arena; Attendance: 5,907; Referee: Michael Tykgaard

29 September 2019 11	SønderjyskE	2–1	Brøndby	Haderslev
18:00	Jakobsen 33'; Hassan (yellow card) 42'; Banggard 80' (yellow card) 90+5'; Ekani (yellow card) 88'	Report	Kaiser (yellow card) 14' (goal) 85'	Stadium: Sydbank Park; Attendance: 6,067; Referee: Anders Poulsen

6 October 2019 12	Brøndby	3–1	Copenhagen	Brøndby
14:00	Hedlund 6' (yellow card) 45+1'; Wilczek 23' 76'; Hermannsson (yellow card) 28'; Frendrup (yellow card) 80'	Report	Maxsø 30' (o.g.); Bendtner (yellow card) 31'; Stage (yellow card) 41'; Falk (red card) 65'; Zeca (yellow card) 75'	Stadium: Brøndby Stadion; Attendance: 21,746; Referee: Jorgen Burchardt

20 October 2019 13	Lyngby	0–3	Brøndby	Kongens Lyngby
18:00	Tshiembe (yellow card) 67'	Report	Wilczek 38', 70' (pen.); Hermannsson (yellow card) 60'; Kaiser 72'	Stadium: Lyngby Stadion; Attendance: 8,547; Referee: Mads Kristoffersen

27 October 2019 14	Brøndby	5–2	Randers	Brøndby
16:00	Wilczek 25', 32' (pen.) (red card) 90+2'; Kaiser 45+3'; Mukhtar 69'; Jung (yellow card) 79'; Piesinger 90' (o.g.)	Report	Egho 10' (yellow card) 79'; Marxen 16'; Carlgren (red card) 29'; Rømer (yellow card) 62'; Piesinger (yellow card) 79'; Conboy (yellow card) 90+1'	Stadium: Brøndby Stadion; Attendance: 17,558; Referee: Jens Maae

4 November 2019 15	Silkeborg	0–1	Brøndby	Silkeborg
19:00	Gertsen (yellow card) 53'; Hagelskjær (yellow card) 84'; Romo (yellow card) 90+1'	Summary	Hedlund 14'	Stadium: JYSK Park; Attendance: 5,432; Referee: Jakob Kehlet

10 November 2019 16	Brøndby	2–1	Esbjerg	Brøndby
16:00	Hermannsson (yellow card) 11'; Mráz 29' 35'; Frendrup (yellow card) 63'	Summary	Parunashvili (yellow card) 51'; Yakovenko 75'	Stadium: Brøndby Stadion; Attendance: 12,392; Referee: Mads Kristoffersen

24 November 2019 17	AGF	2 – 1	Brøndby	Århus
18:00	Bundu 32'; Mortensen 66'	Summary	Rosted (yellow card) 21'; Maxsø (yellow card) 35'; Jung (yellow card) 68'; Wilczek 76' (yellow card) 85'; Mráz (yellow card) 87'	Stadium: Ceres Park; Attendance: 14,043; Referee: Morten Krogh

1 December 2019 18	Copenhagen	2–1	Brøndby	Østerbro
14:45	Fischer 28', 90'	Report	Wilczek 6'	Stadium: Parken; Referee: Jakob Kehlet

8 December 2019 19	Brøndby	1–2	Midtjylland	Brøndby
21:00	Wilczek 64'	Report	Mabil 60'; Onyeka 82'	Stadium: Brøndby Stadion; Referee: Jorgen Burchardt

15 December 2019 20	Brøndby	1–1	Hobro	Brøndby
19:00	Hedlund 37'	Report	Kristoffersen 8'	Stadium: Brøndby Stadion; Referee: Michael Tykgaard

16 February 2020 21	OB	0–2	Brøndby	Odense
21:00		Report	Jung 8'; Christensen 60'	Stadium: Odense Stadion; Referee: Michael Tykgaard

23 February 2020 22	AaB	3–2	Brøndby	Aalborg
21:00		Report		Stadium: Aalborg Stadion; Referee: Mads Kristoffersen

1 March 2020 23	Brøndby	1–0	Lyngby	Brøndby
19:00	Hedlund 53'	Report		Stadium: Brøndby Stadion; Referee: Jens Maae

8 March 2020 24	Nordsjælland	2–2	Brøndby	Farum
22:00	Damsgaard 39'; Atanga 60'	Report	Slimane 6'; Mráz 44'	Stadium: Right to Dream Park; Referee: Peter Kjærsgaard-Andersen

2 June 2020 25	Brøndby	1–0	SønderjyskE	Brøndby
22:00	Lindstrøm (yellow card) 56' (goal) 61'; Tibbling (yellow card) 88'; Uhre (yellow card) 90+2'	Report	Eskesen (yellow card) 39'; Absalonsen (yellow card) 44'; Ekani (yellow card) 70'; Jakobsen (yellow card) 71'; Marfelt (yellow card) 81'	Stadium: Brøndby Stadion; Referee: Sandi Putros

7 June 2020 26	Horsens	3–2	Brøndby	Horsens
20:00	Hansson 52', 60'; Therkildsen 90+1'	Report	Jung 18' (yellow card) 80' (yellow-red card) 83'; Rosted 64' (yellow card) 90'; Tibbling (yellow card) 81'	Stadium: CASA Arena; Referee: Peter Kjærsgaard-Andersen

=== Danish Cup ===
==== Matches ====
25 September 2019 Third round	Skive	2–3 (a.e.t.)	Brøndby	Skive
10:30		Report		Stadium: Skive Stadium

30 October 2019 Fourth round	Brøndby	0–1	SønderjyskE	Brøndby
12:00		Report	Banggaard (yellow card) 66'; Bah (yellow card) 79'; Lieder 84'; Jónsson (yellow card) 86'	Stadium: Brøndby Stadium; Referee: Jens Maae

=== UEFA Europa League ===
==== First-qualifying round ====
Win Draw Loss

11 July 2019	Brøndby	4–1	(Finland) Inter Turku	Brøndby
19:00	Wilczek 5', 67'; Tibbling 71'; Fisker 78'	Report	Furuholm 22'	Stadium: Brøndby Stadion; Attendance: 10,295; Referee: Kristoffer Karlsson (Sweden)

18 July 2019	(Finland) Inter Turku	2–0 (3–4 agg.)	Brøndby	Kupittaa, Turku
18:30 (Lokal tid)	Markkula 52'; Valenčič 56'; Muniz (yellow card) 81'	Report	Jung (yellow card) 3'; Fisker (yellow card) 75'; Kaiser (yellow card) 90'	Stadium: Veritas Stadion; Attendance: 3,711; Referee: Keith Kennedy (Northern Ireland)

==== Second-qualifying round ====
25 July 2019	(Poland) Lechia Gdańsk	2–1	Brøndby	Gdańsk, Poland
19:00	Paixão 26' (str.); Mladenovic (yellow card) 55'; Lipski 63'; Makowski (yellow card) 87'	Report	Hedlund 59'	Stadium: Gdańsk Stadion; Attendance: 25,875; Referee: John Beaton (Scotland)

1 August 2019	Brøndby	4–1 (a.e.t.) (5–3 agg.)	(Poland) Lechia Gdańsk	Brøndby
19:30	Arajuuri 15'; Jung (yellow card) 45'; Wilczek 53'; Lindstrøm 94', 118'; Uhre (yellow card) 102'; Børkeeiet (yellow card) 105'	Report	Paixão 66'; Peszko (yellow card) 105'; Mladenović (yellow card) 105'	Stadium: Brøndby Stadion; Attendance: 16,426; Referee: Miroslav Zelinka (Czech Republic)

==== Third-qualifying round ====
8 August 2019	Brøndby	2–4	(Portugal) S.C. Braga	Brøndby
18:30	Kaiser 15', 50' (yellow card) 76'	Report	Paulinho 18'; A. Horta 20' (yellow card) 38'; Viana (yellow card) 55'; R. Horta 90+2'; Hermannsson 90+5' (sm.)	Stadium: Brøndby Stadion; Attendance: 15,642; Referee: (Hungary) Tamás Bognár

15 August 2019	(Portugal) SC Braga	3–1 (7–3 agg.)	Brøndby	Braga, Portugal
20:45		Report		Stadium: Estádio Municipal de Braga
