= Morten Frendrup =

Danish footballer (born 2001)

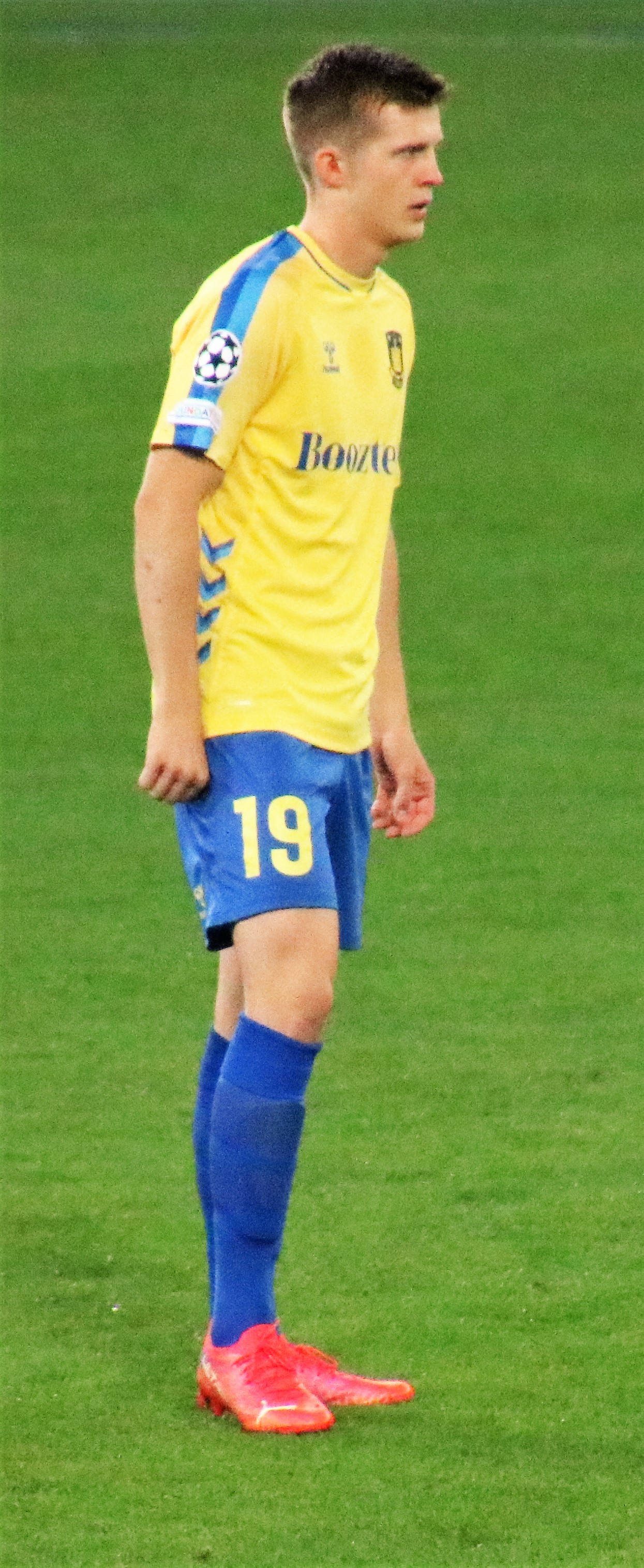
- Frendrup with Brøndby in 2021

Personal information
- Full name: Morten Wetche Frendrup
- Date of birth: 7 April 2001 (age 25)
- Place of birth: Tuse, Denmark
- Height: 1.75 m (5 ft 9 in)
- Positions: Defensive midfielder; full-back

Team information
- Current team: Genoa
- Number: 32

Youth career
- Tuse IF
- 2013–2014: Holbæk B&I
- 2013–2018: Brøndby

Senior career*
Years	Team	Apps	(Gls)
2017–2021	Brøndby	78	(2)
2022–	Genoa	166	(7)

International career^{‡}
2017	Denmark U16	3	(1)
2017–2018	Denmark U17	15	(0)
2018–2019	Denmark U18	5	(0)
2018–2020	Denmark U19	13	(0)
2021–2022	Denmark U21	11	(1)
2024–	Denmark	2	(0)
- * Club domestic league appearances and goals as of 22 November 2026 ‡ National team caps and goals as of 23 March 2025

Morten Wetche Frendrup (Danish pronunciation: [ˈfʁɑnˀtʁɔp]; born 7 April 2001) is a Danish professional footballer who plays as a defensive midfielder or full-back for Serie A club Genoa and the Denmark national team.

Frendrup was born in Tuse and played youth football with Tuse IF and Holbæk B&I before starting his professional career with Brøndby IF, where he became the youngest player to debut for the club. He became an established player under manager Niels Frederiksen and was part of the title-winning team of 2020–21. His performances earned him a move to Serie A club Genoa in February 2022.

== Early life ==
Morten Wetche Frendrup was born on 7 April 2001 in Tuse, Holbæk Municipality, where he also grew up. He is the third and youngest child of Marianne Wetche, a teacher, and Jan Frendrup, a real estate agent and part-time board member of the local sports club Tuse IF. He has one older brother, Lasse, and an older sister, Kristine.

== Club career ==
=== Brøndby ===
==== Early career ====
Frendrup started playing for local team Tuse IF before moving to Holbæk B&I. During this time he also joined the Brøndby IF academy at the under-14 level, playing for both clubs for a short period. When Frendrup finished primary education, he began attending Brøndby Idræts efterskole, a five-minute walk from the Brøndby IF training ground.

Frendrup won the Danish under-15 Cup on 11 May 2016 in a 1–0 victory against FC Nordsjælland. At under-17 level, he captained the team to a second-place finish in the league behind winners AGF.

==== 2017–20: Breakthrough ====
At the age of 16 in summer 2017, Frendrup was included in the first-team training camp in Austria together with fellow academy players Christian Enemark and Andreas Bruus. In December 2017, he signed a new contract with Brøndby, keeping him in the club until the summer of 2020.

At the age of 16 on 11 February 2018, Frendrup made his senior debut in a 3–1 victory against Lyngby Boldklub in the Danish Superliga. He was brought on as a substitute in the 85th minute, becoming the youngest player to appear for Brøndby, 37 days younger than second on the list, Magnus Warming. On 15 March 2018, Frendrup signed his first professional contract, keeping him at the club until 2021.

During the 2019–20 season, Frendrup started playing more regularly in the fall due to long-term injuries to starters Lasse Vigen, Simon Tibbling, and Josip Radošević. His performances during these games were praised, and he subsequently won the Brøndby Player of the Month award for November. On 12 January 2020, Frendrup signed a new three-and-a-half-year contract with Brøndby, running until 2023. He continued his strong performances in the second half of the season and was named Superliga Talent of the Month for June 2020, as well as Brøndby Player of the Month for June and July.

At the end of the season, head coach Niels Frederiksen praised Frendrup as being one of the key players of the Brøndby team during the last half of the season.

==== 2020–21: Danish champions ====
Frendrup continued as a starter in midfield in Brøndby's 2020–21 campaign. He marked his 50th appearance in all competitions on 20 December 2020 as Brøndby beat Horsens 2–1 to go on winter break in first place in the league table.

When Brøndby pushed for its first league title in 16 years at the end of the season, Frendrup was sent off in a crucial game against AGF on 20 May 2021. Leaving the pitch sadly, Frendrup eventually saw his team win 2–1. Upon returning to Brøndby Stadion after the match, Frendrup and the other players were cheered on by fans. Frendrup was sidelined with a suspension for the last game of the season against Nordsjælland, but could see his team win the Danish Superliga title after a 2–0 victory.

Frendrup made his European debut on 17 August 2021 in the UEFA Champions League play-off first leg against Red Bull Salzburg, which ended in a 2–1 loss. On 24 October, he scored his first goal in the domestic league, helping the club to win the Copenhagen Derby against FC Copenhagen.

=== Genoa ===
Frendrup signed for Serie A club Genoa on 30 January 2022, penning a four-and-a-half-year deal. The fee was officially undisclosed, but widely reported as being €3.5 million. On 13 March, he made his debut for Genoa in a goalless away draw against Atalanta, during which he went into the starting eleven at right-back, an unusual position for him, which he covered for the injured Silvan Hefti. He made an appearance in the remainder of the games that season, as Genoa suffered relegation, finishing 19th in the league table; three points from safety. Frendrup was an undisputed starter for Genoa in their first campaign back in Serie B since the 2006–07 season, covering a variety of positions under head coach Alexander Blessin. However, he mainly contributed as a box-to-box midfielder, and was praised for his hard work and ability to read the game. On 3 September 2022, Frendrup scored his first goal for Genoa, opening the score in the team's 3–3 home draw against Parma. Following Blessin's sacking in December 2022, Frendrup continued to play a key role in midfield under new head coach Alberto Gilardino, as Genoa earned promotion back to the Serie A with two games remaining.

Frendrup scored his first goal in the Italian top flight on 17 February 2024 in a 1–1 home draw against Napoli. On 29 February, he extended his contract with Genoa until 2028. He completed his first full Serie A season with two goals and five assists in 37 appearances. Frendrup also led the league in balls won (122) and successful tackles (131), receiving only six yellow cards, as Genoa finished 11th in the table, 14 points clear of the relegation zone. His performances attracted interest from top European clubs during the summer of 2024, with media reports linking him to Liverpool. Frendrup continued his impressive form into the 2024–25 campaign, once again ranking among the league's best in tackles and possession won. Under the guidance of new manager Patrick Vieira, he thrived as a defensive midfielder in a high-pressing, possession-oriented system.

== International career ==
Frendrup was included in the squad for the 2018 UEFA European Under-17 Championship. He played all three of his team's matches as a starter but the Danes failed to advance from the group stage. He gained 13 caps for Denmark under-19, obtained between 2018 and 2020. He wore the captain's armband twice.

On 3 September 2021, Frendrup gained his first cap for the Denmark under-21 team in a 1–1 friendly draw against Greece.

Frendrup was called up to the senior Denmark national team for the first time for the Nations League games against Switzerland and Serbia in September 2024. He debuted against the latter opponent on 8 September at Parken Stadium, replacing Victor Kristiansen in the 82nd minute of Denmark's 2–0 victory.

== Style of play ==
A right-footed midfielder, Frendrup has been described as an all-rounder with relentless energy. He has excellent ball-winning abilities, and has been noted to fill in at different positions, including left-back and right-back. He has been likened to former Brøndby midfielder Christian Nørgaard.

During his time at Genoa, Frendrup solidified his reputation as a versatile and tireless player, leading the league in both balls won (122) and successful tackles (131) while receiving only six yellow cards during the 2023–24 Serie A season. He also ranked sixth in Serie A for duels won (215) and was among the top eight players for interceptions (50). Additionally, he was in the top four for distance covered during matches. His ability to play multiple midfield roles, including defensive midfielder, mezzala, and even as a wing-back, underscores his adaptability and importance to the team. Frendrup's low-profile, high-impact style of play, characterised by his exceptional timing and work rate, made him a key figure in Genoa's midfield.

== Career statistics ==
=== Club ===
As of match played 22 November 2026

Appearances and goals by club, season and competition
Club	Season	League			National cup (Note: Includes Danish Cup, Coppa Italia)		Europe		Total	
Club	Season	Division	Apps	Goals	Apps	Goals	Apps	Goals	Apps	Goals
Brøndby	2017–18	Danish Superliga	3	0	0	0	0	0	3	0
Brøndby	2018–19	Danish Superliga	3	0	1	1	0	0	4	1
Brøndby	2019–20	Danish Superliga	26	0	2	0	0	0	28	0
Brøndby	2020–21	Danish Superliga	31	0	2	0	—		33	0
Brøndby	2021–22	Danish Superliga	15	2	2	0	8 (Note: Two appearances in UEFA Champions League, six appearances in UEFA Europa League)	0	25	2
Brøndby	Total		78	2	7	1	8	0	93	3
Genoa	2021–22	Serie A	10	0	0	0	—		10	0
Genoa	2022–23	Serie B	37	2	3	0	—		40	2
Genoa	2023–24	Serie A	37	2	2	0	—		39	2
Genoa	2024–25	Serie A	35	2	2	0	—		37	2
Genoa	2025–26	Serie A	36	1	3	1	—		39	2
Genoa	2026–27	Serie A	11	0	1	0	—		12	0
Genoa	Total		166	7	11	1	—		177	8
Career total			244	9	18	2	8	0	270	11

== Honours ==
Brøndby

- Danish Superliga: 2020–21
- Danish Cup: 2017–18
