= Anton Skipper =

Danish footballer (born 2000)

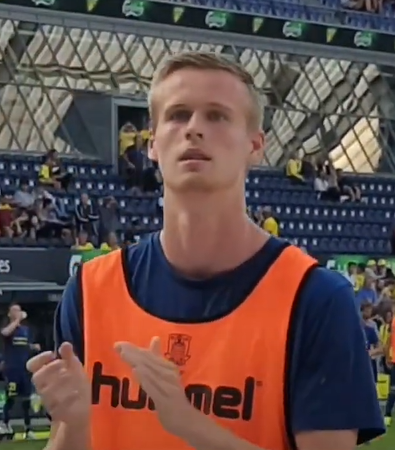
- Skipper in 2020

Personal information
- Full name: Anton Skipper Hendriksen
- Date of birth: 31 March 2000 (age 26)
- Place of birth: Brøndbyøster, Denmark
- Height: 1.94 m (6 ft 4 in)
- Position: Centre-back

Team information
- Current team: Esbjerg fB
- Number: 3

Youth career
- 2004–2006: Brøndby
- 2006–2013: Hvidovre
- 2013–2018: Brøndby

Senior career*
Years	Team	Apps	(Gls)
2019–2022	Brøndby	16	(0)
2021	→ Hobro (loan)	9	(0)
2022–2024	Sarpsborg 08	41	(0)
2022–2024	Sarpsborg 08 2	10	(1)
2024–	Esbjerg fB	47	(1)

International career
2015–2016	Denmark U16	3	(0)
2016–2017	Denmark U17	6	(0)
2018	Denmark U18	2	(0)
2018–2019	Denmark U19	3	(0)
2019–2021	Denmark U21	2	(0)
- * Club domestic league appearances and goals as of 2 June 2026

Anton Skipper Hendriksen (Danish pronunciation: [ˈænˌtsʰʌn ˈskipɐ]; born 31 March 2000) is a Danish professional footballer who plays as a centre-back for Danish 1st Division club Esbjerg fB. He has been capped for Denmark at youth level.

== Early and personal life ==
The family of Skipper is originally from Lolland, but he was born and raised in Vestegnen, Greater Copenhagen. When he went to primary school, he skipped second grade which he meant contributed to him becoming mature from an early age.

== Club career ==
=== Brøndby ===
Skipper joined Brøndby IF aged 4. After playing in the youth of Hvidovre IF for a few years, he rejoined Brøndby in the spring of 2013 at under-13 level. In April 2015, Skipper signed his first contract with Brøndby, keeping him in the club until 2017. As an under-19 player, German club VfL Wolfsburg showed interest in signing him to their youth academy, but a move never materialised.

On 30 November 2019, Brøndby announced that Skipper would become a permanent part of the first team in the spring of 2019. Concomitantly, he signed his first professional contract which would keep him in the club until 2021.

On 28 July 2019, Skipper made his competitive debut with a start in the Danish Superliga match against OB which ended with a 3–2 win for Brøndby. His performance was subsequently praised by pundits. Since his debut in week three of the Danish Superliga, he played each match until Brøndby signed free agent Andreas Maxsø in mid-September. Despite assuming a new role as a substitute, Skipper was still recognised and lauded by the fans of the club. On 22 January 2020, Skipper signed a new three-and-a-half-year contract with Brøndby, running until 2023.

==== Loan to Hobro ====
On 29 January 2021, Skipper was loaned out to Danish 1st Division club Hobro on a six-month deal. He made his debut for the club on 13 February in a 1–1 draw against HB Køge.

==== Return to Brøndby ====
Upon his return to Brøndby for the 2021–22 season, Skipper began making more appearances due to the departure of regular starters Hjörtur Hermannsson and Anthony Jung. He made his European debut on 17 August 2021 in the UEFA Champions League play-off first leg against Red Bull Salzburg, which ended in a 2–1 loss.

=== Sarpsborg 08 ===
On 24 January 2022, Skipper signed a three-year contract with Norwegian Eliteserien club Sarpsborg 08. He made his competitive debut for the club on 3 April, coming off the bench in the 36th minute for injured Magnar Ødegaard and putting on a convincing performance despite a 1–0 loss at home to Viking in the 2022 season opener. The following week, he was a starter at centre-back alongside Bjørn Inge Utvik in a 3–2 away victory against Kristiansund.

On 30 September 2023, Skipper scored his first competitive senior goal, netting the opener in Sarpsborg's reserve team's 3–0 win over Skånland OIF in the Norwegian Third Division.

=== Esbjerg fB ===
On 2 September 2024, newly promoted Danish 1st Division club Esbjerg fB announced the signing of Skipper on a contract running until June 2027. He made his debut two days later, starting in a 3–1 away win over Vejgaard in the Danish Cup. Skipper made his league debut on 15 September, starting in Esbjerg's 4–3 home victory over B.93. Reflecting on the match, he described the closing stages as "too exciting" after completing his first full 90 minutes for the club.

He scored his first goal for Esbjerg on 29 March 2025, heading in a Jakob Ankersen corner after 14 minutes to open the scoring in a 3–0 away win against his former youth club Hvidovre at the Pro Ventilation Arena.

== International career ==
Skipper has won two caps for Denmark at U19 level, and has played multiple matches for national youth teams at different levels.

== Career statistics ==
As of match played 3 December 2025

Appearances and goals by club, season and competition
Club	Season	League			Cup (Note: Includes Danish Cup, Norwegian Football Cup)		Europe		Total	
Club	Season	Division	Apps	Goals	Apps	Goals	Apps	Goals	Apps	Goals
Brøndby	2019–20	Superliga	11	0	0	0	0	0	11	0
Brøndby	2020–21	Superliga	0	0	1	0	—		1	0
Brøndby	2021–22	Superliga	5	0	0	0	2 (Note: Appearances in the UEFA Champions League)	0	7	0
Brøndby	Total		16	0	1	0	2	0	19	0
Hobro (loan)	2020–21	1st Division	9	0	0	0	—		9	0
Sarpsborg 08	2022	Eliteserien	9	0	1	0	—		10	0
Sarpsborg 08	2023	Eliteserien	20	0	5	0	—		25	0
Sarpsborg 08	2024	Eliteserien	12	0	3	0	—		15	0
Sarpsborg 08	Total		41	0	9	0	—		50	0
Sarpsborg 08 2	2022	3. divisjon	6	0	—		—		6	0
Sarpsborg 08 2	2023	3. divisjon	2	1	—		—		2	1
Sarpsborg 08 2	2024	3. divisjon	2	0	—		—		2	0
Sarpsborg 08 2	Total		10	1	—		—		10	1
Esbjerg fB	2024–25	1st Division	18	1	2	0	—		20	1
Esbjerg fB	2025–26	1st Division	15	0	2	0	—		17	0
Esbjerg fB	Total		33	1	4	0	—		37	1
Career total			109	2	14	0	2	0	125	2
