= 2020–21 Brøndby IF season =

Brøndby
2020–21 season
- Chairman: Jan Bech Andersen
- Head coach: Niels Frederiksen
- Stadium: Brøndby Stadium
- Danish Superliga: 1st (champions)
- Danish Cup: Fourth round
- Top goalscorer: League: Mikael Uhre (19 goals); All: Mikael Uhre (20 goals)
Home colours	Away colours

The 2020–21 Brøndby IF season was Brøndby IF's 40th consecutive season in top-division of the Danish football league, the 31st consecutive in Danish Superliga, and the 55th as a football club. Besides the Superliga, the club also competed in the 2020–21 Danish Cup, losing in the fourth round to Danish 1st Division side Fremad Amager. It was the second season with head coach Niels Frederiksen, after he replaced caretaker manager Martin Retov during the previous campaign.

On 24 May 2021, Brøndby were confirmed as Danish Superliga champions for the first time in 16 years following their 2–0 defeat of Nordsjælland.

== Management team ==
Position	Name
Head coach	(Denmark) Niels Frederiksen
Assistant coaches	(Denmark) Jesper Sørensen
Assistant coaches	(Denmark) Martin Retov
Goalkeeper coaches	(Denmark) Lars Høgh
Goalkeeper coaches	(Denmark) Claus Fallentin
Fitness coach	(United States) Ahron Thode
Mental coach	(Denmark) Christian Engell
Fitness coach	(Denmark) Jesper Løvind Andersen

== Players ==
=== Squad information ===
As of 1 February 2021

Note: Flags indicate national team as defined under FIFA eligibility rules; some limited exceptions apply. Players may hold more than one non-FIFA nationality.

No.	Pos.	Nation	Player
1	GK	GER	Marvin Schwäbe
3	DF	GER	Anthony Jung
4	DF	NOR	Sigurd Rosted
5	DF	DEN	Andreas Maxsø (captain)
6	DF	ISL	Hjörtur Hermannsson
7	MF	DEN	Rezan Corlu
9	FW	SRB	Andrija Pavlović
11	FW	DEN	Mikael Uhre
12	DF	DEN	Michael Lumb
14	DF	DEN	Kevin Mensah (vice-captain)
15	DF	PAR	Blás Riveros
16	GK	DEN	Michael Tørnes
17	DF	DEN	Andreas Bruus

No.	Pos.	Nation	Player
18	MF	DEN	Jesper Lindstrøm
19	MF	DEN	Morten Frendrup
20	MF	SWE	Oskar Fallenius
21	MF	DEN	Lasse Vigen
22	MF	CRO	Josip Radošević
24	DF	DEN	Joel Kabongo
25	MF	TUN	Anis Ben Slimane
27	FW	SWE	Simon Hedlund
29	MF	DEN	Peter Bjur
30	GK	DEN	Mads Hermansen
40	GK	DEN	Jonathan Ægidius
42	MF	NOR	Tobias Børkeeiet

=== Youth players in use ===
Note: Flags indicate national team as defined under FIFA eligibility rules; some limited exceptions apply. Players may hold more than one non-FIFA nationality.

No.	Pos.	Nation	Player
31	FW	DEN	Jagvir Singh
34	MF	DEN	Andreas Pyndt

No.	Pos.	Nation	Player
36	FW	DEN	Mathias Kvistgaarden

== Transfers ==
=== In ===
==== Summer ====
Date	No.	Pos.	Player	From	Fee	Source
19 September 2020	9	FW	(Serbia) Andrija Pavlović	(Austria) Rapid Wien	Undisclosed	
5 October 2020	15	DF	(Paraguay) Blas Riveros	(Switzerland) FC Basel	Undisclosed	

==== Winter ====
Date	No.	Pos.	Player	From	Fee	Source
4 January 2021	12	DF	(Denmark) Michael Lumb	(Denmark) Horsens	Undisclosed	
4 January 2021	20	MF	(Sweden) Oskar Fallenius	(Sweden) Brommapojkarna	Undisclosed	
7 February 2021 (Note: Taking effect on 1 July 2021)		MF	(United States) Christian Cappis	(Denmark) Hobro	Undisclosed	

=== Out ===
==== Summer ====
Date	No.	Pos.	Player	To	Fee	Source
27 July 2020	12	MF	(Sweden) Simon Tibbling	(Netherlands) Emmen	Undisclosed	
22 August 2020	8	MF	(Denmark) Kasper Fisker	(Denmark) Fremad Amager	Undisclosed	

=== Loan out ===
==== Summer ====
Date	Until	No.	Pos.	Player	To	Fee	Source
19 August 2020	30 June 2021		FW	(Croatia) Ante Erceg	(Croatia) Osijek	Free	
5 October 2020	30 June 2021		DF	(Denmark) Jens Martin Gammelby	(Denmark) Lyngby	Free	

==== Winter ====
Date	Until	No.	Pos.	Player	To	Fee	Source
29 January 2021	30 June 2021		DF	(Denmark) Anton Skipper	(Denmark) Hobro IK	Free	

== Pre-season and friendlies ==
Win Draw Loss Fixtures

22 August 2020 Friendly	Brøndby (Denmark)	3–1	(Denmark) Næstved	Brøndby Stadium
13:00 CEST		Report

27 August 2020 Friendly	Brøndby (Denmark)	2–1	(Denmark) Helsingør	Brøndby Stadium
13:00 CEST		Report

31 August 2020 Friendly	Odense (Denmark)	1–2	(Denmark) Brøndby	Odense, Denmark
15:00 CEST	Hyllegaard 21'	Report	Uhre 61'; Vigen 77'	Stadium: Nature Energy Park

5 September 2020 Friendly	Crystal Palace (England)	1–1	(Denmark) Brøndby	Selhurst, England
15:00 BST	Zaha 35'	Report	Lindstrøm 70'	Stadium: Selhurst Park; Attendance: 0

== Competitions ==
=== Overview ===
Competition	Statistics							
Competition	P	W	D	L	GF	GA	GD	Win %
Superliga	32	19	4	9	58	38	+20	59.38
Danish Cup	2	1	0	1	2	2	+0	50.00
Total	34	20	4	10	60	40	+20	58.82

=== Superliga ===
==== Results summary ====
Overall								Home						Away					
Pld	W	D	L	GF	GA	GD	Pts	W	D	L	GF	GA	GD	W	D	L	GF	GA	GD
33	19	4	10	60	36	+24	61	10	4	3	32	19	+13	9	0	7	28	17	+11

Last updated: 24 May 2021 Source: FBref

==== Results by matchday ====
Matchday	1	2	3	4	5	6	7	8	9	10	11	12	13	14	15	16	17	18	19	20	21	22
Ground	H	A	H	A	A	H	A	H	A	H	A	H	A	A	H	A	H	A	H	H	A	H
Result	W	W	W	W	L	L	L	W	W	W	L	W	W	W	D	W	W	L	D	W	W	D
Position	4	1	1	1	1	4	5	4	3	1	3	2	2	1	1	1	1	2	2	1	1	1

Updated to match(es) played on 21 March 2021. Source: Weltfussball
A = Away; H = Home; W = Win; D = Draw; L = Loss

==== Regular season ====
Pos	Team	Pld	W	D	L	GF	GA	GD	Pts	Qualification
1	Brøndby	22	14	3	5	40	24	+16	45	Qualification for the Championship round
2	Midtjylland	22	13	4	5	35	20	+15	43	Qualification for the Championship round
3	AGF	22	10	8	4	35	22	+13	38	Qualification for the Championship round
4	Copenhagen	22	10	5	7	39	35	+4	35	Qualification for the Championship round
5	Randers	22	9	5	8	31	21	+10	32	Qualification for the Championship round

Source: Danish Football Association (in Danish), Soccerway
Rules for classification: 1) Points; 2) Goal difference; 3) Goals scored; 4) Away goals scored; 5) Play-off (played on neutral ground if determining teams for different rounds); 6) Draw.

==== Championship round ====
Pos	Team	Pld	W	D	L	GF	GA	GD	Pts	Qualification	BRO	MID	COP	AGF	NOR	RAN
1	Brøndby (C)	32	19	4	9	58	38	+20	61	Qualification for the Champions League play-off round	—	3–1	1–3	2–2	2–0	2–0
2	Midtjylland	32	18	6	8	57	33	+24	60	Qualification for the Champions League second qualifying round	1–0	—	4–1	4–0	3–0	1–1
3	Copenhagen	32	16	7	9	61	53	+8	55	Qualification for the Europa Conference League second qualifying round	2–1	4–2	—	3–2	2–2	2–1
4	AGF (O)	32	13	9	10	48	42	+6	48	Qualification for the European play-off match	1–2	1–4	1–2	—	3–1	2–0
5	Nordsjælland	32	11	10	11	51	51	0	43		0–3	3–2	2–2	2–0	—	2–1

Source: Danish Football Association (in Danish), Soccerway
Legend: Blue = home team win; Yellow = draw; Red = away team win.
Rules for classification: 1) Points; 2) Goal difference; 3) Goals scored; 4) Away goals scored; 5) Play-off (played on neutral ground if determining teams for different rounds); 6) Draw.
(C) Champions; (O) Play-off winners

==== Matches ====
===== Regular season =====
13 September 2021 1	Brøndby	3–2	Nordsjælland	Brøndbyvester
16:00 CEST	Hedlund 47'; Vigen 75'; Rosted (yellow card) 77' (goal) 90+6'	Report	Diomande 12' (yellow card) 63'; Rygaard 38'; Hansen (yellow card) 60'	Stadium: Brøndby Stadium; Referee: Jens Maae

20 September 2021 2	Copenhagen	1–2	Brøndby	Copenhagen
14:00 CEST	Wilczek 12' (yellow card) 44'; Nelsson (yellow card) 90+2'	Report	Lindstrøm 31' (yellow card) 65'; Bruus (yellow card) 57'; Uhre 90+3'	Stadium: Parken Stadium; Referee: Jorgen Burchardt

27 September 2021 3	Brøndby	2–1	Horsens	Brøndbyvester
16:00 CEST	Lindstrøm 5'; Hedlund 45+1'; Rosted (yellow card) 46'	Report	Lumb 90+1'	Stadium: Brøndby Stadium; Referee: Michael Tykgaard

2 October 2021 4	Randers	1–2	Brøndby	Randers
19:00 CEST	Kamara 74'	Report	Rosted 14'; Uhre 64'; Schwäbe (yellow card) 90+1'	Stadium: Randers Stadium; Referee: Mads Kristoffersen

18 October 2021 5	SønderjyskE	2–0	Brøndby	Haderslev
16:00 CEST	Wright 48'; Bah 54'	Report		Stadium: Sydbank Park; Referee: Sandi Putros

24 October 2021 6	Brøndby	2–3	Midtjylland	Brøndbyvester
18:00 CEST	Rosted (yellow card) 15' (yellow-red card) 80'; Bruus 16'; Pavlović (yellow card) 38'; Uhre (yellow card) 45+1'; Lindstrøm 51'; Radošević (yellow card) 72'; Maxsø (yellow card) 90+4'	Report	Evander (yellow card) 45+1'; Sviatchenko (yellow card) 56'; Dreyer 62'; Sisto 73'; Cajuste (yellow card) 85'; Schwäbe 90+4' (o.g.)	Stadium: Brøndby Stadium; Referee: Jorgen Burchardt

1 November 2021 7	AaB	2–1	Brøndby	Aalborg
16:00 CET	Fossum 32'; van Weert 85'	Report	Uhre 39'; Pavlović (yellow card) 52'	Stadium: Aalborg Stadium; Referee: Peter Kjaersgaard-Andersen

8 November 2021 8	Brøndby	3–1	OB	Brøndbyvester
16:00 CET	Riveros 20'; Pavlović 47'; Lindstrøm 55'; Maxsø (yellow card) 62'	Report	Laursen (yellow card) 71'; Fenger 90+5'	Stadium: Brøndby Stadium; Referee: Sandi Putros

22 November 2021 9	Vejle	0–2	Brøndby	Vejle
16:00 CET	Allan Sousa (yellow card) 39'; Mølgaard (yellow card) 59'; Muçolli (yellow card) 63'	Report	Lindstrøm (yellow card) 39' (goal) 45+4'; Jung (yellow card) 65'; Frendrup (yellow card) 78'; Uhre 82'	Stadium: Vejle Stadium; Referee: Jakob Sundberg

30 November 2021 10	Brøndby	4–1	Lyngby	Brøndbyvester
19:00 CET	Lindstrøm 2', 79'; Uhre 46'; Rosted 55'	Report	Geertsen (yellow card) 58'; Hebo (yellow card) 61'; Fosgaard (yellow card) 84'; Warming 90'	Stadium: Brøndby Stadium; Referee: Mads Kristoffersen

7 December 2021 11	AGF	3–1	Brøndby	Aarhus
19:00 CET	Links 37'; Juelsgård (yellow card) 51'; Grønbæk (yellow card) 76' (goal) 80'; Mortensen 78'	Report	Frendrup (yellow card) 11' (yellow-red card) 50'; Hedlund 45'; Bruus (yellow card) 72'	Stadium: Ceres Park; Referee: Jorgen Burchardt

13 December 2021 12	Brøndby	2–1	SønderjyskE	Brøndbyvester
18:00 CET	Uhre 32' (yellow card) 41'; Vigen (yellow card) 55'; Slimane 83'	Report	Jacobsen 42' (pen.) (yellow card) 53'; Hassan (yellow card) 81'; Simonsen (yellow card) 86'	Stadium: Brøndby Stadium; Referee: Peter Kjaersgaard-Andersen

20 December 2021 13	Horsens	1–2	Brøndby	Horsens
20:00 CET	Prip (penalty missed) 27' (yellow card) 54'; Kiilerich (yellow card) 45+5'; Gemmer (yellow card) 70'; Finnbogason 90+2' (yellow card) 90+4'	Report	Uhre 20' (pen.); Lindstrøm 63'; Vigen (yellow card) 86'	Stadium: CASA Arena Horsens; Referee: Jakob Kehlet

4 February 2021 14	Nordsjælland	0–1	Brøndby	Farum
20:00 CET	Jenssen (yellow card) 45'	Report	Hedlund 13'; Frendrup (yellow card) 90+2'	Stadium: Right to Dream Park; Referee: Jakob Kehlet

7 February 2021 15	Brøndby	1–1	AaB	Brøndbyvester
20:00 CET	Rosted (yellow card) 8'; Uhre 72' (pen.); Radošević (yellow card) 72'	Report	Hannesbo 51'; Pedro Ferreira (yellow card) 57'; Kakeeto (yellow card) 71'	Stadium: Brøndby Stadium; Attendance: 0 Referee: Morten Krogh

14 February 2021 16	Lyngby	0–4	Brøndby	Lyngby
16:00 CET	Kornvig (yellow card) 87'; Warming (yellow card) 90+1'	Report	Mensah 27'; Lindstrøm 31'; Hedlund 58'; Pavlović 73'	Stadium: Lyngby Stadium; Attendance: 0 Referee: Mads Kristoffersen

21 February 2021 17	Brøndby	2–1	Vejle	Brøndbyvester
18:00 CET	Uhre 15'; Bengtsson 47' (o.g.); Pavlović (yellow card) 90'	Report	Faghir 56'; Allan Sousa (yellow card) 88'	Stadium: Brøndby Stadium; Attendance: 0 Referee: Mikkel Redder

28 February 2021 18	Midtjylland	1–0	Brøndby	Herning
18:00 CET	Isaksen 65'; Paulinho (yellow card) 87' (yellow-red card) 90+3'; Cools (yellow card) 90'	Report	Bjur (yellow card) 64'	Stadium: MCH Arena; Attendance: 0 Referee: Jakob Kehlet

4 March 2021 19	Brøndby	0–0	Randers	Brøndbyvester
20:00 CET	Vigen (yellow card) 15'; Lindstrøm (yellow card) 87'	Report	Piesinger (yellow card) 45+1'	Stadium: Brøndby Stadium; Attendance: 0 Referee: Mads-Kristoffer Kristoffersen; Fourth official: Benjamin Svedborg

7 March 2021 20	Brøndby	2–1	Copenhagen	Brøndbyvester
14:00 CET	Vigen 70'; Bruus (yellow card) 70'; Maxsø 90+1' (pen.)	Report	Jørgensen (yellow card) 83'; Stage (yellow card) 89' (goal) 90+3'; Bundu (yellow card) 90+5'	Stadium: Brøndby Stadium; Attendance: 0 Referee: Jakob Kehlet; Fourth official: Morten Krogh

14 March 2021 21	OB	0–3	Brøndby	Odense
16:00 CET	Drachmann (yellow card) 38'	Report	Uhre 20', 35', 39'	Stadium: Odense Stadium; Attendance: 0 Referee: Morten Krogh

21 March 2021 22	Brøndby	1–1	AGF	Brøndbyvester
17:00 CET	Uhre 36'	Report	Mortensen 34' (pen.)	Stadium: Brøndby Stadium; Attendance: 0 Referee: Jørgen Burchardt

===== Championship round =====
5 April 2021 23	Midtjylland	1–0	Brøndby	Herning
18:00 CEST	Kaba 19'; Lössl (yellow card) 89'; Cajuste (yellow card) 90+6'	FCM Summary	Mensah (yellow card) 65'; Slimane (yellow card) 82'	Stadium: MCH Arena; Attendance: 0 Referee: Mads-Kristoffer Kristoffersen

11 April 2021 24	Brøndby	1–3	Copenhagen	Brøndbyvester
16:00 CET	Frendrup (yellow card) 2'; Uhre 69'; Rosted (yellow card) 90+5'	FCK Summary	Wilczek 37' (Kristiansen) 90+6' (Stage); Daramy 90+1'	Stadium: Brøndby Stadium; Attendance: 0 Referee: Michael Tykgaard

18 April 2021 25	Brøndby	2–2	AGF	Brøndbyvester
18:00	Maxsø 31' (pen.); Lindstrøm 71'; Børkeeiet (yellow card) 90+2' (yellow-red card) 90+2'	Report	Diks 16'; Grønbæk 45'	Stadium: Brøndby Stadium; Referee: Jens Maae

21 April 2021 26	Nordsjælland	0–3	Brøndby	Farum
20:00 CEST	Chukwuani (yellow card) 76'; Sadiq (yellow card) 81'	BIF Summary	Uhre 21' (Hedlund); Hermannsson (yellow card) 85'; Pavlović 86' (Hedlund); Vigen 89' (Fallenius)	Stadium: Right to Dream Park; Attendance: 1,800; Referee: Anders Poulsen

26 April 2021 27	Brøndby	2–0	Randers	Brøndbyvester
16:00 CEST	Uhre 41'; Slimane 78'	Report		Stadium: Brøndby Stadium; Attendance: 7,488; Referee: Jakob Kehlet

2 May 2021 28	Randers	4–2	Brøndby	Randers
16:00 CEST	Kehinde 29'; Hammershøy-Mistrati 46', 48' (pen.); Klysner 87'	Report	Hermannsson 16'; Hedlund 73'	Stadium: Randers Stadium; Attendance: 3,157; Referee: Jakob A. Sundberg

9 May 2021 29	Brøndby	3–1	Midtjylland	Brøndbyvester
18:00 CEST	Uhre 37'; Radošević (yellow card) 57'; Hedlund 70'; Pavlović 83'	FCM Summary	Scholz 32' (pen.); Paulinho (red card) 40'	Stadium: Brøndby Stadium; Attendance: 8,158; Referee: Peter Kjærsgaard-Andersen

16 May 2021 30	Copenhagen	2–1	Brøndby	Copenhagen
16:00 CEST	Maxsø 27' (o.g.); Wind 55' (pen.); Daramy (yellow card) 87'; Zeca (yellow card) 90+1'	FCK Summary	Hermannsson (yellow card) 6'; Hedlund 39' (Mensah); Bruus (yellow card) 45+2'; Lindstrøm (red card) 68'; Jung (yellow card) 78'; Schwäbe (yellow card) 87'Corlu (yellow card) 90'	Stadium: Telia Parken; Attendance: 11,086; Referee: Mads-Kristoffer Kristoffersen

20 May 2021 31	AGF	1–2	Brøndby	Aarhus
20:00 CEST	Þorsteinsson (yellow card) 18'; Olsen 38' (pen.) (yellow card) 76'		Uhre 5' (Hedlund) 73'; Frendrup (yellow card) 24' (yellow-red card) 35'; Vigen (yellow card) 72'; Hedlund (yellow card) 81'	Stadium: Ceres Park; Attendance: 8,220; Referee: Sandi Putros

24 May 2021 32	Brøndby	2–0	Nordsjælland	Brøndbyvester
18:00 CEST	Vigen 45' (Hedlund); Slimane 51' (Mensah); Corlu (yellow card) 77'	BIF Summary		Stadium: Brøndby Stadium; Attendance: 9,669; Referee: Jakob Kehlet

=== Danish Cup ===
5 November 2020 Third round	LSF	0–1	Brøndby	Smørum Idrætscenter
11:15 CET			Hedlund 40'

17 December 2020 Fourth round	Fremad Amager	2–1 (a.e.t.)	Brøndby	Sundby Idrætspark, Amager Vest
09:30 CET	Toku 26'; Iyede 94'	Report	Uhre 45+3'	Referee: Jonas Hansen

== Statistics ==
=== Goalscorers ===
Rank	No.	Pos	Nat	Name	Superliga	Danish Cup	Total
1	11	FW	(Denmark)	Mikael Uhre	19	1	20
2	18	MF	(Denmark)	Jesper Lindstrøm	10	0	10
3	27	FW	(Sweden)	Simon Hedlund	8	1	9
4	9	FW	(Serbia)	Andrija Pavlović	4	0	4
4	21	MF	(Denmark)	Lasse Vigen	4	0	4
6	4	DF	(Denmark)	Sigurd Rosted	3	0	3
6	25	MF	(Tunisia)	Anis Ben Slimane	3	0	3
8	5	DF	(Denmark)	Andreas Maxsø	2	0	2
9	6	DF	(Iceland)	Hjörtur Hermannsson	1	0	1
9	14	DF	(Denmark)	Kevin Mensah	1	0	1
9	15	DF	(Paraguay)	Blas Riveros	1	0	1
9	17	DF	(Denmark)	Andreas Bruus	1	0	1
Own goals					1	0	1
Totals					58	2	60

Last updated: 24 May 2021

=== Clean sheets ===
Rank	No.	Pos	Nat	Name	Superliga	Danish Cup	Total
1	1	GK	(Germany)	Marvin Schwäbe	8	1	9
Totals					8	1	9

Last updated: 24 May 2021

=== Discipline ===
No.	Pos.	Player	Superliga			Danish Cup			Total		
No.	Pos.	Player	Yellow card	(yellow card) (yellow-red card)	Red card	Yellow card	(yellow card) (yellow-red card)	Red card	Yellow card	(yellow card) (yellow-red card)	Red card
1	GK	(Germany) Marvin Schwäbe	1	0	0	0	0	0	1	0	0
3	DF	(Germany) Anthony Jung	1	0	0	0	0	0	1	0	0
4	DF	(Norway) Sigurd Rosted	5	1	0	0	0	0	5	1	0
5	DF	(Denmark) Andreas Maxsø	2	0	0	0	0	0	2	0	0
9	FW	(Serbia) Andrija Pavlović	3	0	0	0	0	0	3	0	0
11	FW	(Denmark) Mikael Uhre	2	0	0	0	0	0	2	0	0
17	DF	(Denmark) Andreas Bruus	2	0	0	0	0	0	2	0	0
18	MF	(Denmark) Jesper Lindstrøm	2	0	0	0	0	0	2	0	0
19	MF	(Denmark) Morten Frendrup	4	1	0	0	0	0	4	1	0
21	MF	(Denmark) Lasse Vigen	2	0	0	0	0	0	2	0	0
22	MF	(Croatia) Josip Radošević	2	0	0	0	0	0	2	0	0
Total			26	2	0	0	0	0	26	2	0

Last updated: 21 February 2021.
Source: FBref
