= Mikael Uhre =

Danish footballer (born 1994)

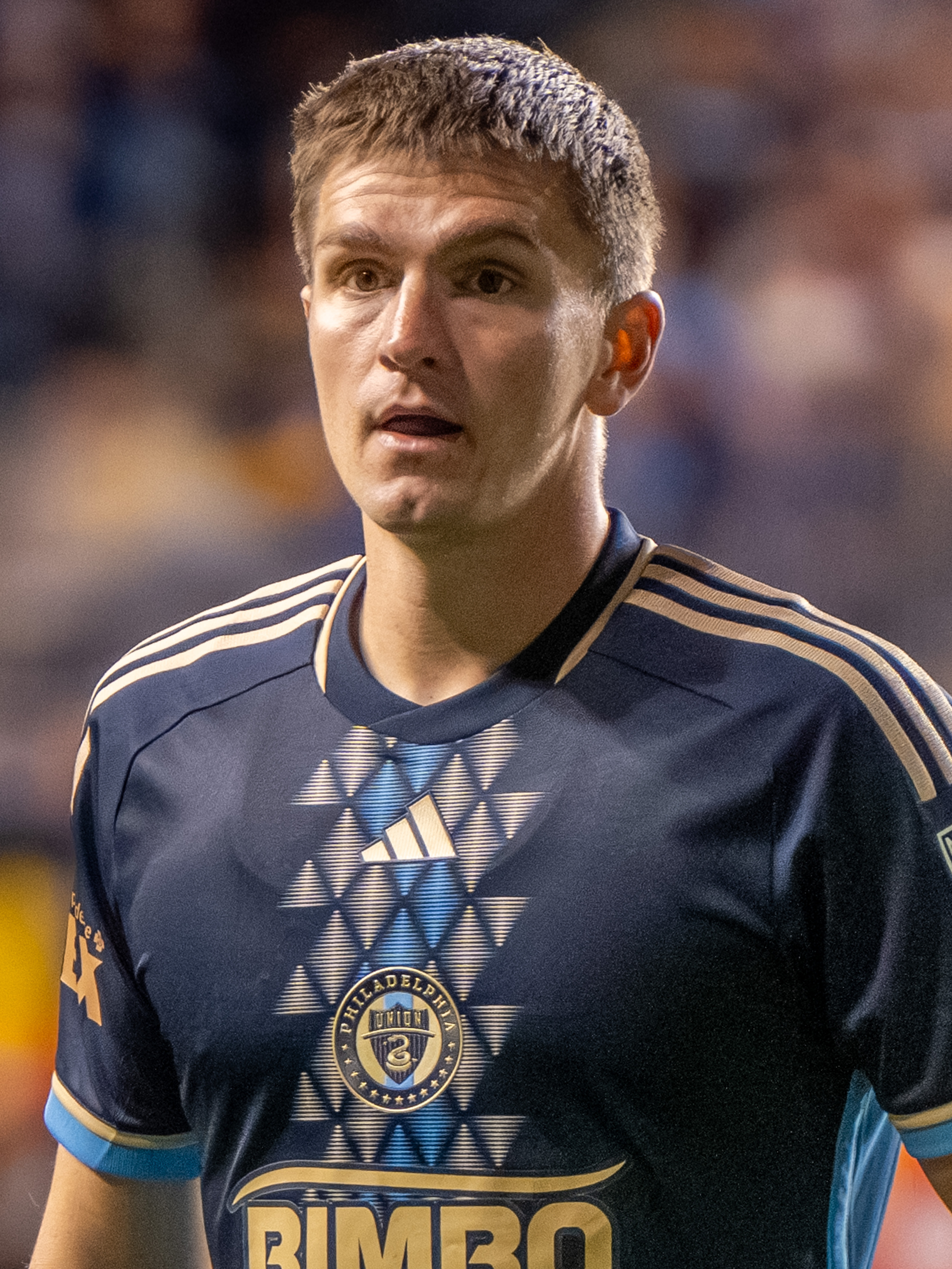
- Uhre with the Philadelphia Union in 2025

Personal information
- Full name: Mikael Brandhof Uhre
- Date of birth: 30 September 1994 (age 32)
- Place of birth: Ribe, Denmark
- Height: 1.88 m (6 ft 2 in)
- Position: Forward

Team information
- Current team: Midtjylland
- Number: 17

Youth career
- Skovlund IF
- 2007–2010: Grindsted GIF
- 2011–2013: SønderjyskE

Senior career*
Years	Team	Apps	(Gls)
2013–2015	SønderjyskE	19	(1)
2014–2015	→ Skive (loan)	13	(3)
2015–2016	Skive	31	(15)
2016–2018	SønderjyskE	75	(13)
2018–2022	Brøndby	99	(42)
2022–2025	Philadelphia Union	119	(38)
2026–	Midtjylland	7	(0)

International career
2016–2017	Denmark U21	1	(0)
2018	Denmark League XI	2	(0)
2021	Denmark	1	(0)
- * Club domestic league appearances and goals as of 20:01, 19 September 2026 (UTC)

Mikael Brandhof Uhre (Danish: [ˈmiˌkʰɛˀl ˈuɐ]; born 30 September 1994) is a Danish professional footballer who plays as a forward for Danish Superliga club Midtjylland.

A youth product of SønderjyskE, Uhre enjoyed his breakthrough in the second tier for Skive during the 2015–16 season, prompting a return to SønderjyskE. There, he became noted for his physical strength, speed and ability in the air, and Brøndby signed him in 2018. After a few years as a reserve, Uhre grew into a starter and became top goalscorer of the league and Danish Superliga Player of the Season as Brøndby won the 2020–21 Danish Superliga. In 2022, he signed for the Philadelphia Union in the United States.

== Club career ==
=== SønderjyskE ===
As a youth, Uhre played for Skovlund IF before moving to Grindsted GIF at age 12. At one point, he had a youth trial with Midtjylland, where he did not manage to impress. After spending a year at efterskole between primary and secondary education at Sportsefterskolen SINE in Løgumkloster, one of his teachers encouraged him to participate in tryouts with Danish Superliga club SønderjyskE, where he subsequently joined their youth academy. On 28 March 2013, Uhre made his debut for SønderjyskE. Uhre started on the bench, but replaced Nicolaj Madsen in the 88th minute in a 5–0 away win over Silkeborg IF. In April 2013, Uhre signed his first professional contract with the club.

=== Skive IK ===
On 15 August 2014, Uhre was sent on a six-month loan deal to Skive IK. He played on an amateur deal while at Skive, working weekdays at an office. He made 13 league appearances and scored three goals during his loan. After his loan deal expired in January 2015, he played for SønderjyskE for six more months, before officially joining Skive in the summer 2015 on a one-year contract. During his sole season under contract in Skive, Uhre scored 15 goals in 33 appearances, only two goals behind league top goalscorer Kjartan Finnbogason.

=== Return to SønderjyskE ===
Uhre rejoined SønderjyskE on 5 June 2016, signing a three-year contract with the club. On 14 July, Uhre made his Europa League debut as a substitute in a 2–1 win over Norwegian side Strømsgodset, appearing in the last 27 minutes in place of Troels Kløve. On 17 July, he played his first Superliga match after returning to SønderjyskE, a matchup against AGF. Coming as a 59th-minute substitute, SønderjyskE lost the match 2–1.

Uhre made 75 total appearances during his two seasons in SønderjyskE in which he scored 13 goals.

=== Brøndby ===
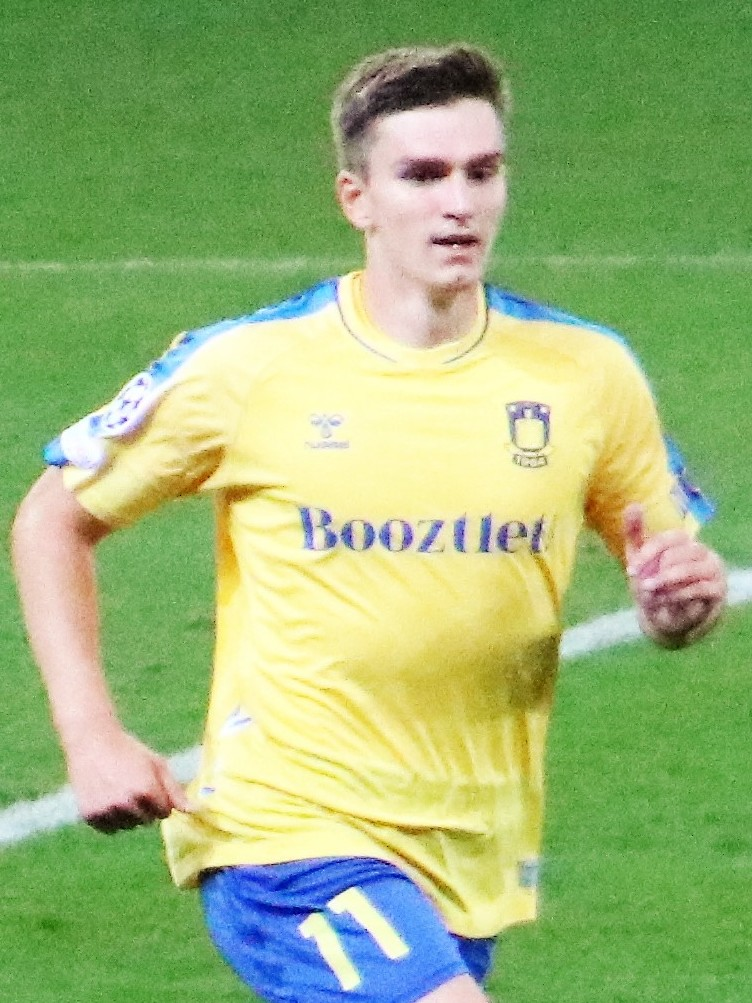
Uhre with Brøndby in 2021.

==== 2018–20 ====
On 18 January 2018, it was announced that a deal had been agreed with SønderjyskE for Uhre to join Brøndby IF on 15 June 2018 on a four-and-a-half-year deal. The transfer fee was later revealed to be around 3 million DKK. On 16 July, Uhre made his debut for Brøndby in a Superliga match against Randers FC. The match ended in a 2–0 away win for Brøndby.

On 29 July, Uhre came off the bench against Hobro IK substituting Ante Erceg in the 68th minute. Subsequently, he secured a 2–1 away win for Brøndby, scoring the winning goal deep in injury time. He finished the 2018–19 season with 6 goals in 28 league matches. During large parts of the 2018–19 season, Uhre was mostly used as a substitute for regular strikers Kamil Wilczek and Simon Hedlund.

On 21 June 2020, he scored the decisive 1–1 equaliser off a bad return ball to seal a draw against FC Copenhagen in the 89th minute. This marked his first goal in 11 months, and came after him coming on as a substitute for Sigurd Rosted in the 84th minute. He would then feature as a starter in Brøndby's following matches, after Hedlund and Mráz had been tested positive for COVID-19. On 9 July, Uhre provided an assist and netted a hat-trick in the club's 4–0 victory over FC Nordsjælland. Thereafter, he became an established starter for Brøndby.

==== 2020–21: Top goalscorer ====
In the second match-day of the 2020–21 season, on 20 September 2020, Uhre scored the winner deep into stoppage time in a derby against Copenhagen as Brøndby won 2–1. He had also earlier provided an assist to Jesper Lindstrøm who had netted the equaliser after former Brøndby player Kamil Wilczek had scored the opener for Copenhagen. His strong form continued throughout the fall, and he topped the list of players in the Superliga with most goals and assists combined in late November. He was voted Player of the Month in December 2020 by Brøndby's fans, having scored three goals in four appearances during the month.

On 14 March 2021, Uhre scored a perfect hat-trick in the first half of the Superliga match against Odense Boldklub – all from assists from Jesper Lindstrøm – sealing the 0–3 win for Brøndby and the first place in the league table ahead of the championship round. His performances led to him being named Superliga Player of the Month for March. As Brøndby qualified for the championship round, Uhre's goalscoring continued with goals against Copenhagen, Nordsjælland, Randers, Midtjylland and a brace against AGF on 20 May, which propelled the club to a first place in the league table with one match to go. Earlier that day, he was voted the Tipsbladet Player of the Spring by managers of the Superliga. On 24 May, as Brøndby won their first league title in 16 years after a 2–0 win over Nordsjælland, Uhre became top goalscorer of the Superliga with 19 goals to his name.

At the end of the season, Uhre was awarded with the Danish Superliga Player of the Season award.

==== 2021–22 ====
Uhre scored his first goal of the 2021–22 season on the third matchday against Vejle Boldklub. On 17 August 2021, Uhre scored the opener in a 1–2 loss to Red Bull Salzburg in the first leg of the play-off round of the UEFA Champions League. He also scored a brace against OB and a goal against Midtjylland to bring his season total to five goals in nine games.

=== Philadelphia Union ===
In January 2022, Uhre signed for Philadelphia Union competing in Major League Soccer as a designated player through the 2024 season, with a club option for 2025. Philadelphia reportedly paid a club record $2.8 million transfer fee to acquire Uhre.

On 22 April 2023, Uhre scored a hat-trick in a 4–2 victory at home against Toronto FC, the first and only such time he had achieved such a feat in his career. He was then voted MLS Player of the Matchday.

=== Midtjylland ===
On 8 January 2026, Uhre signed for Danish Superliga club Midtjylland on a free transfer.

== International career ==
On 27 March 2017, Uhre gained his only cap for the Denmark national under-21 team in a 0–4 defeat in Randers to England.

Uhre received his first call up to the Denmark senior team in November 2021 for the 2022 FIFA World Cup qualification match against Scotland. Uhre made his debut for the Danish national team against Scotland, when he was substituted in the 72nd minute of Denmark's 2–0 defeat at Hampden Park.

== Career statistics ==
As of match played 15 October 2026

Appearances and goals by club, season and competition
Club	Season	League			National cup (Note: Includes Danish Cup and U.S. Open Cup)		Continental		Other		Total	
Club	Season	Division	Apps	Goals	Apps	Goals	Apps	Goals	Apps	Goals	Apps	Goals
SønderjyskE	2012–13	Danish Superliga	5	0	0	0	—		—		5	0
SønderjyskE	2013–14	Danish Superliga	12	1	0	0	—		—		12	1
SønderjyskE	2014–15	Danish Superliga	2	0	0	0	—		—		2	0
SønderjyskE	Total		19	1	0	0	—		—		19	1
Skive (loan)	2014–15	Danish 1st Division	13	3	2	0	—		—		15	3
Skive	2015–16	Danish 1st Division	31	14	3	1	—		—		34	15
SønderjyskE	2016–17	Danish Superliga	34	5	2	0	6 (Note: Appearances in UEFA Europa League)	3	—		42	8
SønderjyskE	2017–18	Danish Superliga	29	5	2	0	—		4 (Note: Appearance in Danish Superliga relegation play-offs)	0	35	5
SønderjyskE	Total		63	10	4	0	6	3	4	0	77	13
Brøndby	2018–19	Danish Superliga	27	6	4	2	3	0	1 (Note: Appearance in Danish Superliga Europa League play-off)	0	35	8
Brøndby	2019–20	Danish Superliga	24	6	2	0	3	0	—		29	6
Brøndby	2020–21	Danish Superliga	32	19	1	1	—		—		33	20
Brøndby	2021–22	Danish Superliga	16	11	3	1	7 (Note: Two appearances and one goal in UEFA Champions League, five appearances and one goal in UEFA Europa League)	2	—		27	14
Brøndby	Total		99	42	10	4	14	2	1	0	124	48
Philadelphia Union	2022	Major League Soccer	27	13	0	0	—		3 (Note: Appearances in MLS Cup Playoffs)	0	30	13
Philadelphia Union	2023	Major League Soccer	33	9	1	0	5 (Note: Appearance in CONCACAF Champions Cup)	0	10 (Note: Seven appearances and one goal in Leagues Cup, three appearances and one goal in MLS Cup Playoffs)	2	49	11
Philadelphia Union	2024	Major League Soccer	30	10	—		4	1	7 (Note: Appearances in Leagues Cup)	2	41	13
Philadelphia Union	2025	Major League Soccer	29	6	4	0	—		2	0	33	6
Philadelphia Union	Total		119	38	5	0	9	1	22	4	155	43
Midtjylland	2025–26	Danish Superliga	6	0	1	0	1 (Note: Appearance in UEFA Europa League)	0	—		8	0
Midtjylland	2026–27	Danish Superliga	1	0	1	0	1 (Note: Appearances in UEFA Conference League)	0	—		3	0
Midtjylland	Total		7	0	2	0	2	0	—		11	0
Career total			351	108	26	5	31	6	27	4	435	123

== Honours ==
Brøndby

- Danish Superliga: 2020–21

Philadelphia Union

- Supporters' Shield: 2025
- MLS Cup runner-up: 2022

Midtjylland

- Danish Cup: 2025–26

Individual

- Danish Superliga Player of the Month: March 2021
- Danish Superliga Golden Boot: 2020–21
- Danish Superliga Player of the Year: 2020–21
- Brøndby Player of the Month: December 2020
- Tipsbladet Player of the Spring: 2021
