= Andreas Maxsø =

Danish footballer (born 1994)

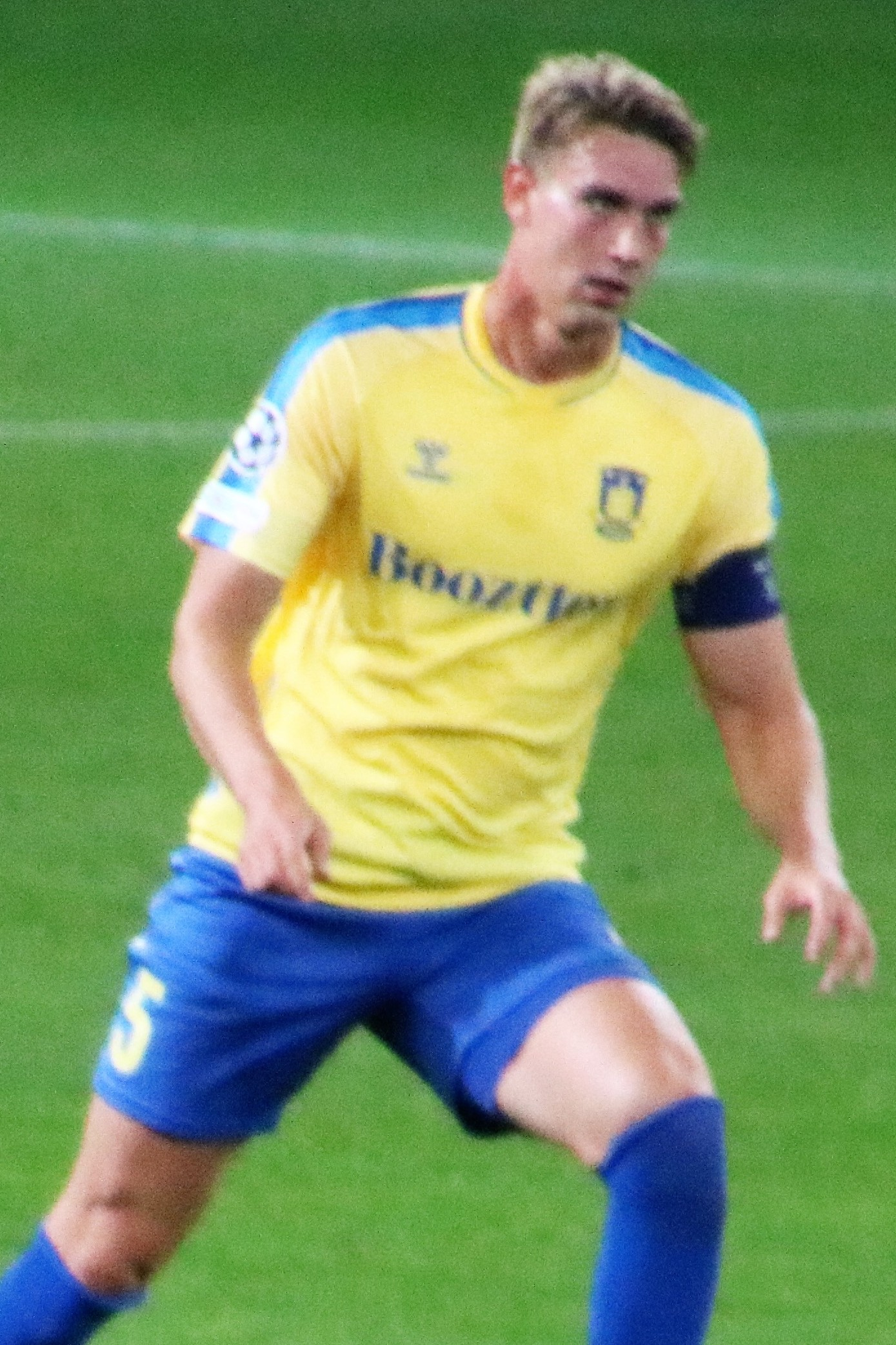
- Maxsø in 2021

Personal information
- Full name: Andreas Beyer Maxsø
- Date of birth: 18 March 1994 (age 32)
- Place of birth: Hvidovre, Denmark
- Height: 6 ft 3 in (1.91 m)
- Position: Centre-back

Team information
- Current team: Midtjylland
- Number: 2

Youth career
- 2000–2010: Brøndby
- 2010–2012: Nordsjælland

Senior career*
| Years | Team | Apps | (Gls) |
| 2012–2017 | Nordsjælland | 108 | (3) |
| 2017–2018 | Osmanlıspor | 20 | (1) |
| 2018–2019 | FC Zürich | 28 | (0) |
| 2019 | KFC Uerdingen 05 | 5 | (0) |
| 2019–2022 | Brøndby | 96 | (5) |
| 2023–2025 | Colorado Rapids | 99 | (3) |
| 2026 | Kalba | 11 | (1) |
| 2026– | Midtjylland | 2 | (0) |

International career
| 2013 | Denmark U19 | 1 | (0) |
| 2015–2017 | Denmark U21 | 24 | (0) |
| 2020–2022 | Denmark | 2 | (0) |
- * Club domestic league appearances and goals as of 19 October 2026

Andreas Beyer Maxsø (Danish pronunciation: [ˈmɑksø]; born 18 March 1994) is a Danish professional footballer who plays as a centre-back for Danish Superliga club Midtjylland. He is known for his strength, leadership and aerial ability.

After moving to the academy of FC Nordsjælland in 2010 from childhood club Brøndby IF, Maxsø made his professional debut in 2012 against Copenhagen. In 2017, he joined Turkish club Osmanlıspor before signing for Swiss side FC Zürich the following season, where he had a successful Europa League campaign, making the round of 32 in his season there. In 2019, he signed for KFC Uerdingen 05 before leaving the club by mutual agreement two months later and returning to his first club, Brøndby. There, he became team captain after six months.

Maxsø has played for various Danish national youth teams. Notably, he gained 24 caps for the Denmark national under-21 team. He made his debut for the Denmark national team on 11 November 2020 in a friendly against Sweden.

== Club career ==
=== Early career ===
Originally a midfielder, Maxsø went through the youth ranks of Brøndby IF whom he joined when he was six years old. In 2009, he was promoted to the under-17 team and competed for a starting position on midfield against the likes of Pierre-Emile Højbjerg, Andrew Hjulsager and Frederik Holst, who were all regulars on the Danish national under-17 team. In his early days at Brøndby, Maxsø did not stand out as a player as he was neither big nor particularly quick, but those who worked with him noted his constant desire to improve various aspects of his game.

=== Nordsjælland ===
In 2010, he joined the FC Nordsjælland youth academy and had a large growth spurt that made him taller and physically stronger, which meant that he could transition to defense more easily.

On 9 December 2012, Maxsø made his professional debut for FC Nordsjælland, in a Superliga match against FC Copenhagen, where he was assigned to cover their striker, Andreas Cornelius. Despite losing 4–1, Maxsø stated after the match that he felt his debut went "alright." Two months later, he was one out of six under-19 players, who were invited to participate in the first-team training camp in La Manga.

Maxsø signed a contract extension with Nordsjælland in the summer of 2016 and turned down a transfer offer from Danish top side FC Copenhagen, citing a desire to play abroad. While at the club, Maxsø grew out to become one of the most important players in Nordsjælland and a key player in defense. After having the role of vice-captain in the 2015–16 season, he became club captain in the 2016–17 season. On 11 January 2017, Maxsø revealed his intentions of leaving Nordsjælland in the summer of 2017 with the goal of being sold after the 2017 UEFA European Under-21 Championship.

=== Osmanlıspor ===
On 4 August 2017, it was announced that Maxsø was sold to Turkish club Osmanlıspor. In his Süper Lig debut against Yeni Malatyaspor he scored his first goal for the club but could not prevent his side losing 3–1. He would struggle to find his footing in Osmanlıspor, and was taken out at halftime in the 4–2 loss to Sivasspor on 17 September after being a part of a defense conceding four goals before half. Maxsø had strong performances during the rest of the fall season, however, as he started in the first 15 matches. Despite this, Osmanlıspor finished the first half of the season 16th out of 18 in the table.

Maxsø was benched during almost the entire second half of the season. He played his first minutes of the second half of the season on 3 March 2018, coming on in the 84th minute for Tortol Lumanza in a match against Kasımpaşa. He left the club after its relegation from the Turkish Süperlig at the end of the season.

=== FC Zürich ===
On 29 June 2018, Maxsø signed a three-year contract with Swiss Super League side FC Zürich. He made his league debut for the club on 23 September 2018 in a 1–0 home victory over FC Luzern. He played all ninety minutes of the match. On 25 October, he was part of the starting lineup as Zürich won 3–2 over Bayer 04 Leverkusen in the Europa League group stage. He would later also appear in the round of 32 matchups against Napoli, where Zürich lost 5–1 on aggregate. Maxsø scored his first goal for the club on 9 February 2019 in a local derby against Grasshoppers, which was won 3–1. He finished the season with 36 appearances for the club in which he scored one goal, as Zürich ended seventh in the league missing out on European qualification by two points.

=== KFC Uerdingen 05 ===
On 3 July 2019, German 3. Liga club KFC Uerdingen 05 announced that they had signed Maxsø. On 2 September, he left the club by mutual agreement only two months and six appearances after his arrival, for personal reasons. He later explained to Danish newspaper B.T. that his move to Uerdingen happened as part of a deal with Zürich, who had a cooperation agreement with the former. He had initially expected to be sent on to Bournemouth of the Premier League, with whom the two clubs also had an agreement. Bournemouth had scouted him in Osmanlıspor, and encouraged Maxsø to sign with their cooperation club, Zürich, with the goal to sign him later on, in case his performances kept improving. However, as the transfer window closed, Maxsø explained that he was 'stuck' in Uerdingen 05 and had decided to buy himself out of his contract; something which according to him cost him millions of Danish kroner, but was a necessary career move.

=== Brøndby ===
Maxsø joined Brøndby IF on a four-year contract on 9 September 2019. On 15 September, he made his Superliga-debut for Brøndby in a 4–2 home win over his former team, Nordsjælland. On 25 September, Maxsø scored his first goal for Brøndby, a vital equalizer in extra time in the Danish Cup against Skive IK. The match ended in a 3–2 win for Brøndby. Throughout the fall, he established himself as a leading figure in the central defense of manager Niels Frederiksen's 3–5–2 formation and stabilising a formerly struggling defense together with fellow defenders Sigurd Rosted and Hjörtur Hermannsson. In late January 2020, after the departure of Kamil Wilczek, Maxsø was named club captain after having only been at the club for six months. He scored his first Superliga-goal for Brøndby on 28 June against his former club Nordsjælland, a penalty, as they won 2–0. His performances led to him being named as the Danish Superliga Player of the Month for June 2020.

On 11 December 2020, Maxsø received the award of Brøndby Player of the Year 2020, beating out fellow nominees Anthony Jung and Morten Frendrup. He scored his third goal – another penalty – for the club on 7 March 2021 in a 2–1 win in the New Firm over Copenhagen. On 24 May 2021, Maxsø lifted Brøndby's first league title in 16 years after a 2–0 win over Nordsjælland.

In July 2021, Maxsø agreed to personal terms and was a medical away from signing with Russian Premier League club Rostov, but the move fell through after the club had hired new manager Yury Syomin who preferred a four-man defense and had, as a consequence, opted to sign Bastos on loan instead. Maxsø would instead stay at Brøndby, and made his European debut for the club on 17 August in a 2–1 away loss to Red Bull Salzburg in the first leg of the play-off round of the UEFA Champions League. In the return leg, he scored his first goal of the season in another 2–1 loss.

=== Colorado Rapids ===
On 27 January 2023, Maxsø signed with Major League Soccer side Colorado Rapids on a three-year deal with a club-held option for the 2026 season. Maxsø became the first defender to sign a designated player contract with the Rapids and is also classified as an international player for MLS roster purposes. Maxsø made his debut for the Rapids starting in a 4–0 defeat to Seattle Sounders FC on 26 February 2023. On 26 November 2025, the team declined Maxsø's contract option.

=== Kalba ===
On 8 February 2026, Maxsø joined Emirati side Kalba.

=== Midtjylland ===
On 29 September 2026, Maxsø joined Danish Superliga side FC Midtjylland on a contract for the rest of 2026.

== International career ==
Maxsø represented Denmark U19s in 2013 and made his debut for Denmark U21s in 2015.

He made his debut for the Denmark national team on 11 November 2020 in a friendly against Sweden.

== Style of play ==
Maxsø has been described as a strong defender, who is formidable in creating chances from the back. Not afraid of playing with risk, he nonetheless had one of the best passing percentages in his first season with Brøndby, recording an 88.9% passing precision. He has also been described by teammates as a "leading presence on and off the field".

== Career statistics ==
As of match played 19 October 2026

Appearances and goals by club, season and competition
| Club | Season | League | | | National cup (Note: Includes Danish Cup, Turkish Cup, Swiss Cup, DFB-Pokal, U.S. Open Cup) | | Continental | | Other | | Total | |
| Club | Season | Division | Apps | Goals | Apps | Goals | Apps | Goals | Apps | Goals | Apps | Goals |
|---|---|---|---|---|---|---|---|---|---|---|---|---|
| Nordsjælland | 2012–13 | Danish Superliga | 2 | 0 | — | | 0 | 0 | — | | 2 | 0 |
| Nordsjælland | 2013–14 | Danish Superliga | 12 | 0 | 1 | 0 | 0 | 0 | — | | 13 | 0 |
| Nordsjælland | 2014–15 | Danish Superliga | 27 | 0 | 0 | 0 | — | | — | | 27 | 0 |
| Nordsjælland | 2015–16 | Danish Superliga | 32 | 2 | 1 | 0 | — | | — | | 33 | 2 |
| Nordsjælland | 2016–17 | Danish Superliga | 33 | 1 | 1 | 0 | — | | — | | 34 | 1 |
| Nordsjælland | 2017–18 | Danish Superliga | 2 | 0 | — | | — | | — | | 2 | 0 |
| Nordsjælland | Total | | 108 | 3 | 3 | 0 | — | | — | | 111 | 3 |
| Osmanlıspor | 2017–18 | Süper Lig | 20 | 1 | 2 | 0 | — | | — | | 22 | 1 |
| FC Zürich | 2018–19 | Swiss Super League | 28 | 1 | 4 | 0 | 5 (Note: Appearances in UEFA Europa League) | 0 | — | | 37 | 1 |
| KFC Uerdingen 05 | 2019–20 | 3. Liga | 5 | 0 | 1 | 0 | — | | — | | 6 | 0 |
| Brøndby | 2019–20 | Danish Superliga | 28 | 1 | 2 | 1 | — | | — | | 30 | 2 |
| Brøndby | 2020–21 | Danish Superliga | 30 | 2 | 2 | 0 | — | | — | | 32 | 2 |
| Brøndby | 2021–22 | Danish Superliga | 27 | 1 | 3 | 0 | 8 (Note: Two appearances and one goal in UEFA Champions League, six appearances in UEFA Europa League) | 1 | — | | 38 | 2 |
| Brøndby | 2022–23 | Danish Superliga | 11 | 1 | 1 | 0 | 0 | 0 | — | | 12 | 1 |
| Brøndby | Total | | 96 | 5 | 8 | 1 | 8 | 1 | 0 | 0 | 112 | 7 |
| Colorado Rapids | 2023 | Major League Soccer | 33 | 2 | 3 | 0 | — | | 2 (Note: Appearances in Leagues Cup) | 0 | 38 | 2 |
| Colorado Rapids | 2024 | Major League Soccer | 34 | 0 | — | | — | | 9 (Note: Seven appearances in Leagues Cup, two appearances in MLS Cup playoffs) | 0 | 43 | 0 |
| Colorado Rapids | 2025 | Major League Soccer | 32 | 1 | — | | — | | 3 | 1 | 35 | 2 |
| Colorado Rapids | Total | | 99 | 3 | 3 | 0 | — | | 14 | 1 | 116 | 4 |
| Kalba | 2025–26 | UAE Pro League | 11 | 1 | — | | — | | — | | 11 | 1 |
| Midtjylland | 2026–27 | Danish Superliga | 2 | 0 | 0 | 0 | 0 | 0 | — | | 2 | 0 |
| Career total | | | 369 | 14 | 21 | 1 | 13 | 1 | 14 | 1 | 417 | 17 |

== Honours ==
Brøndby

- Danish Superliga: 2020–21

Individual

- Superliga Player of the Month: June 2020
- Brøndby Player of the Year: 2020
