= Andreas Bruus =

Danish footballer (born 1999)

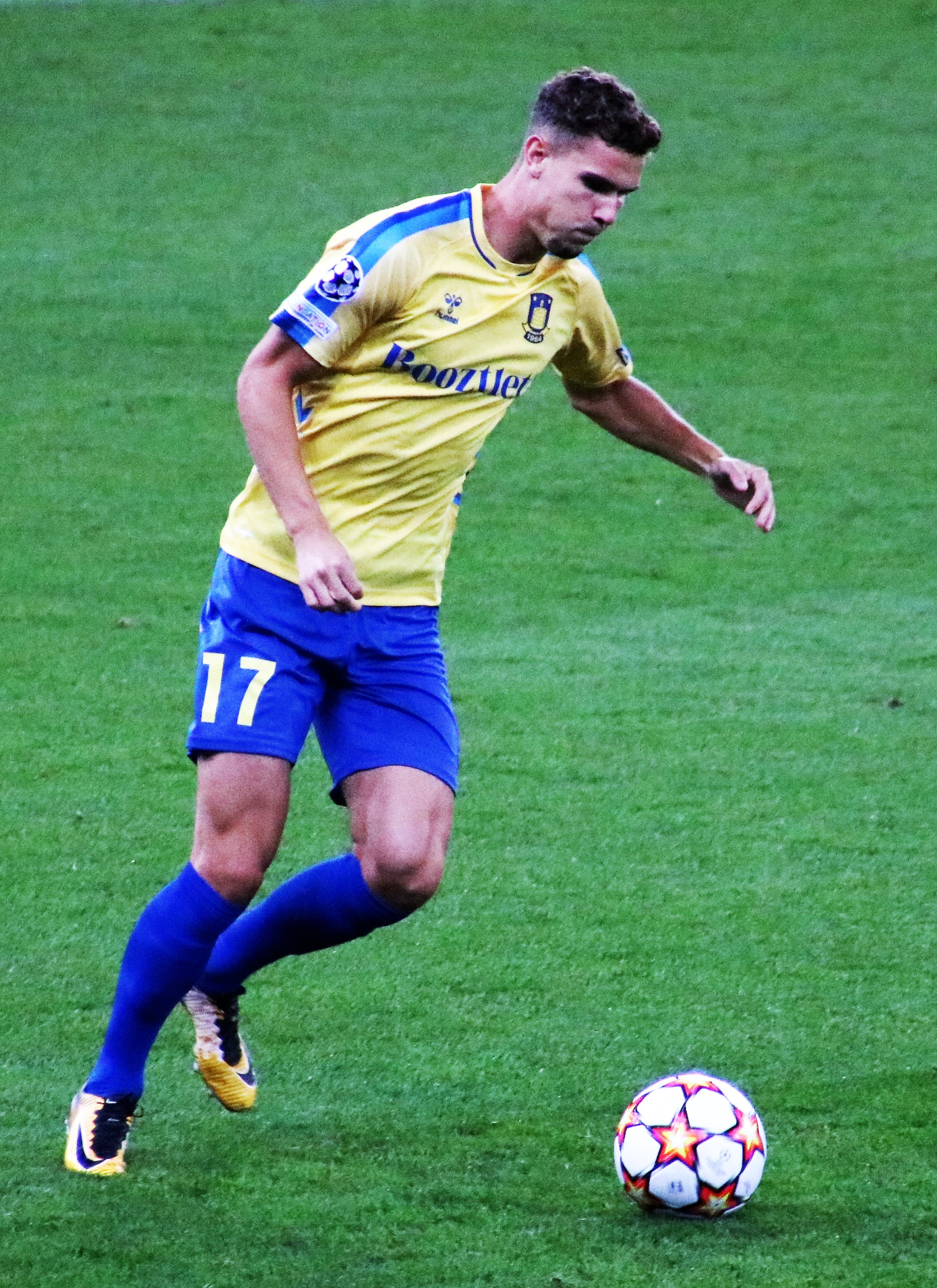
- Bruus in 2021

Personal information
- Date of birth: 16 January 1999 (age 27)
- Place of birth: Greve Strand, Denmark
- Height: 1.83 m (6 ft 0 in)
- Position: Right-back

Team information
- Current team: Horsens
- Number: 5

Youth career
- 2005–2017: Brøndby

Senior career*
Years	Team	Apps	(Gls)
2018–2022	Brøndby	73	(4)
2018–2019	→ Roskilde (loan)	20	(4)
2022–2025	Troyes	41	(1)
2024–2025	→ AaB (loan)	20	(0)
2025–	Horsens	9	(1)

International career
2014–2015	Denmark U16	7	(1)
2015–2016	Denmark U17	11	(2)
2016–2017	Denmark U18	3	(0)
- * Club domestic league appearances and goals as of 05:47, 27 April 2026 (UTC)

Andreas Bruus (Danish pronunciation: [ˈpʁuːs]; born 16 January 1999) is a Danish professional footballer who plays as a right-back for Danish Superliga club AC Horsens. He has also represented Denmark at youth international level.

== Career ==
=== Brøndby ===
==== Youth ====
Born in Greve Strand, Bruus joined the Brøndby IF youth academy in 2005. He combined this with education at first Krogårdsskolen in his hometown of Greve, and later secondary school at Albertslund Gymnasium together with fellow Brøndby talents Casper Hauervig and Christian Enemark.

On 25 October 2017, Bruus signed his first professional contract with Brøndby IF, a two-and-a-half-year deal which tied him to the club until the summer of 2019. He was included in the first team squad from 1 January 2018. He made his Brøndby debut at the age of 18 when he was brought on for the final ten minutes in the 2–2 home draw against AGF on 10 December 2017.

==== Loan to Roskilde ====
Bruus signed a new three-year contract on 31 August 2018 with Brøndby before joining Danish second tier club FC Roskilde on loan until the end of the 2018–19 season. He scored four goals in 24 appearances during his spell, including a brace against Nykøbing FC in a 5–0 away win.

==== Return to Brøndby ====
Bruus returned to Brøndby after his loan, but failed to make any appearances during the fall of the 2019–20 season under new manager Niels Frederiksen. In January 2020, he appeared as a right wing-back in friendlies against BK Avarta and Hvidovre IF indicating a new, more defensive role for him in Brøndby after having mostly played as a striker before. He continued in this role in friendlies against Lyngby and Hvidovre, and was called up for the first team in their first match, after the COVID-19 pandemic had suspended the competition, on 2 June 2020 for the match against SønderjyskE. Bruus came on as a substitute for an injured Kevin Mensah with 20 minutes remaining.

On 19 July, Bruus signed a new contract to keep him at the club until 2023, after having established himself as a starter at the right wing-back position in head coach Frederiksen's 3–5–2 formation. A few months later, on 24 October 2020, Bruus scored his first goal for Brøndby in a 3–2 home loss to Midtjylland.

Bruus made his European debut for the club on 17 August 2022 in a 2–1 away loss to Red Bull Salzburg in the first leg of the play-off round of the UEFA Champions League.

=== Troyes ===
Bruus joined Ligue 1 club Troyes on 18 July 2022, signing a five-year contract. He made his competitive debut for the club on 7 August, starting at right-back and providing an assist in a 3–2 away loss to Montpellier. In the following league match against Toulouse, he fell out with a knee injury, sidelining him for the following weeks.

On 2 September 2024 the Danish Superliga side AaB confirmed that Bruus joined the club on a loan deal until the end of the 2024–25 season.

=== AC Horsens ===
On 18 September 2025, Bruus joined Danish 1st Division club AC Horsens on a free transfer, signing a deal until June 2027.

== Career statistics ==
As of match played 1 July 2026

Appearances and goals by club, season and competition
Club	Season	League			National cup		Europe		Other		Total	
Club	Season	Division	Apps	Goals	Apps	Goals	Apps	Goals	Apps	Goals	Apps	Goals
Brøndby	2017–18	Superliga	4	0	0	0	0	0	—		4	0
Brøndby	2018–19	Superliga	0	0	0	0	0	0	—		0	0
Brøndby	2019–20	Superliga	12	0	0	0	0	0	—		12	0
Brøndby	2020–21	Superliga	28	1	2	0	—		—		30	1
Brøndby	2021–22	Superliga	29	3	3	0	6 (Note: Two appearances in UEFA Champions League, five appearances in UEFA Europa League)	0	—		38	3
Brøndby	Total		73	4	5	0	6	0	—		84	4
Roskilde (loan)	2018–19	1st Division	20	4	2	0	—		—		22	4
Troyes	2022–23	Ligue 1	27	0	0	0	—		—		27	0
Troyes	2023–24	Ligue 2	12	1	1	0	—		—		13	1
Troyes	2024–25	Ligue 2	2	0	0	0	—		—		2	0
Troyes	Total		41	1	1	0	—		—		42	1
AaB	2024–25	Danish Superliga	20	0	4	0	—		—		24	0
AC Horsens	2025–26	Danish 1st Division	9	1	0	0	—		—		9	1
Career total			163	10	12	0	6	0	0	0	181	10

== Honours ==
Brøndby

- Danish Superliga: 2020–21
- Danish Cup: 2017–18
