= Joel Kabongo =

Danish footballer (born 1998)

Personal information
- Full name: Joel Zakarias Kabongo
- Date of birth: 5 April 1998 (age 28)
- Place of birth: Albertslund, Denmark
- Height: 1.94 m (6 ft 4 in)
- Position: Centre-back

Youth career
- 2003–2008: Albertslund IF
- 2008–2017: Brøndby

Senior career*
Years	Team	Apps	(Gls)
2017–2021	Brøndby	15	(0)
2017	→ Fremad Amager (loan)	10	(0)
2021–2022	Randers	2	(0)
Total		27	(0)

International career
2013	Denmark U16	1	(0)
2016	Denmark U18	4	(0)
2016–2017	Denmark U19	6	(0)
2018–2019	Denmark U21	5	(0)
- * Club domestic league appearances and goals

Joel Zakarias Kabongo (Danish pronunciation: [kʰæˈpʌŋko]; born 5 April 1998) is a Danish former professional footballer who played as a centre-back.

== Club career ==
=== Early career ===
Kabongo started playing for hometown club Albertslund IF before signing a youth contract with Brøndby IF. During his time in the youth teams, Kabongo was a part of the under-17 team that won the championship and the domestic cup. On 31 August 2017, Kabongo moved to second division club Fremad Amager on loan until 1 January 2018. He made his first-team debut for Fremad on 3 September, coming on as a substitute for Heini Vatnsdal in the 82nd minute of a 1–0 win home win against Esbjerg fB.

=== Brøndby ===
After returning to Brøndby from his loan spell, Kabongo saw playing time in the team's pre-season friendlies, being in the starting lineup in a match against Shakhtar Donetsk. Kabongo made his official debut for Brøndby in the first match of the 2018–19 Danish Superliga season, starting in a 2–0 away win over Randers FC and playing the entire match.

On 16 August 2018, Kabongo made his UEFA Europa League debut, starting in a 2–1 home win over Spartak Subotica. His debut was short-lived, however, as he was sent off in the 15th minute for a professional foul on Dejan Đenić. On 26 August 2018, in a 2–1 win over Vendsyssel FF, Kabongo was sent off again, this time for a 92nd minute foul on Sander Fischer, resulting in a penalty and Kabongo being shown a second yellow card. On 22 April 2019, in a match against FC Midtjylland, Kabongo suffered a cruciate ligament tear and was substituted in the first half. The initial prognosis suggested that he would miss 12 months.

On 5 March 2020, Kabongo, alongside several other Brøndby personnel, was placed in home quarantine after having met with former Brøndby-player Thomas Kahlenberg, who had tested positive for SARS-CoV-2 in the early stages of the COVID-19 pandemic in Denmark. Kahlenberg had been infected at a birthday party in Amsterdam, the Netherlands. Kabongo made his comeback in football on 21 May 2020 in a friendly against Lyngby.

=== Randers ===
On 27 July 2021 it was confirmed, that Kabongo had left Brøndby to join fellow league club Randers FC on a three-year deal. He made his debut for the club on 8 August, coming on as a substitute for Frederik Lauenborg in the 88th minute in a 1–0 win. On 28 August, he was injured again and was initially sidelined for the match against Silkeborg on the same day. On 1 October, Kabongo announced via his Instagram account that he had suffered a more serious knee injury which had required surgery.

On 1 August 2022, Randers FC announced that Kabongo had retired, aged 24, after failing to recover from a long-term knee injury originally sustained in a league match for Brøndby against Midtjylland in April 2019.

== Personal life ==
Kabongo and his girlfriend, Melanie Litgov, have one daughter, Veneda (born 30 April 2020 at Rigshospitalet).

== Career statistics ==
Appearances and goals by club, season and competition
Club	Season	League			Danish Cup		Europe		Total	
Club	Season	Division	Apps	Goals	Apps	Goals	Apps	Goals	Apps	Goals
Brøndby	2017–18	Superliga	0	0	0	0	—		0	0
Brøndby	2018–19	Superliga	15	0	1	0	2 (Note: Appearance(s) in UEFA Europa League)	0	17	0
Brøndby	2019–20	Superliga	0	0	0	0	—		0	0
Brøndby	2020–21	Superliga	0	0	0	0	—		0	0
Brøndby	Total		15	0	1	0	2	0	18	0
Fremad Amager (loan)	2017–18	1st Division	10	0	1	0	—		11	0
Randers	2021–22	Superliga	2	0	0	0	0	0	2	0
Randers	2022–23	Superliga	0	0	0	0	—		0	0
Randers	Total		2	0	0	0	0	0	2	0
Career total			27	0	2	0	2	0	31	0

== Honours ==
Brøndby IF

- Danish Superliga: 2020–21
- Danish Cup: 2017–18
