= Lasse Vigen Christensen =

Danish footballer (born 1994)

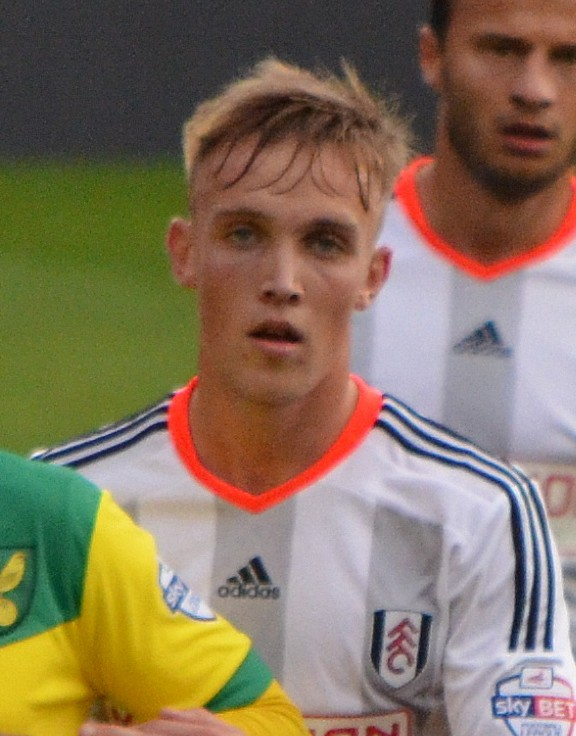
- Christensen playing for Fulham in 2014

Personal information
- Full name: Lasse Vigen Christensen
- Date of birth: 15 August 1994 (age 32)
- Place of birth: Esbjerg, Denmark
- Height: 1.78 m (5 ft 10 in)
- Position: Midfielder

Team information
- Current team: Esbjerg fB
- Number: 6

Youth career
- 1999–2009: Esbjerg fB
- 2010–2012: FC Midtjylland
- 2012–2015: Fulham

Senior career*
Years	Team	Apps	(Gls)
2013–2017	Fulham	54	(6)
2017	→ Burton Albion (loan)	16	(0)
2017–2021	Brøndby	111	(12)
2021–2023	Zulte Waregem	31	(0)
2023	Silkeborg	14	(0)
2023–2025	ADO Den Haag	27	(2)
2025–	Esbjerg fB	34	(1)

International career
2009–2010	Denmark U16	7	(0)
2010–2011	Denmark U17	24	(2)
2011–2012	Denmark U18	8	(0)
2012–2013	Denmark U19	13	(0)
2013–2017	Denmark U21	38	(5)
- * Club domestic league appearances and goals as of 2 June 2026

Lasse Vigen Christensen (Danish: [ˈlæsə ˈviˀn̩ ˈkʰʁestn̩sn̩, - ˈkʰʁæs-]; born 15 August 1994) is a Danish professional footballer who plays as a midfielder for Danish 1st Division side Esbjerg fB.

== Club career ==
=== Early career ===
Born in Esbjerg, Denmark, Christensen began his football career at Esbjerg fB at age 5. While still at Esbjerg, he went on a trial with Arsenal, in the end, however, he decided to move to the FC Midtjylland-academy.

A year and a half into his time at Midtjylland, he went on a trial with Fulham in November 2011. A few months later, in January 2012, he moved to Fulham on a permanent deal. Shortly after the move, he was assigned to the club's development squad. Over the years, his progression through the Fulham ranks earned him praised and leading to being trained with the first team. Whilst there, he also became the club's U18 captain.

=== Fulham ===
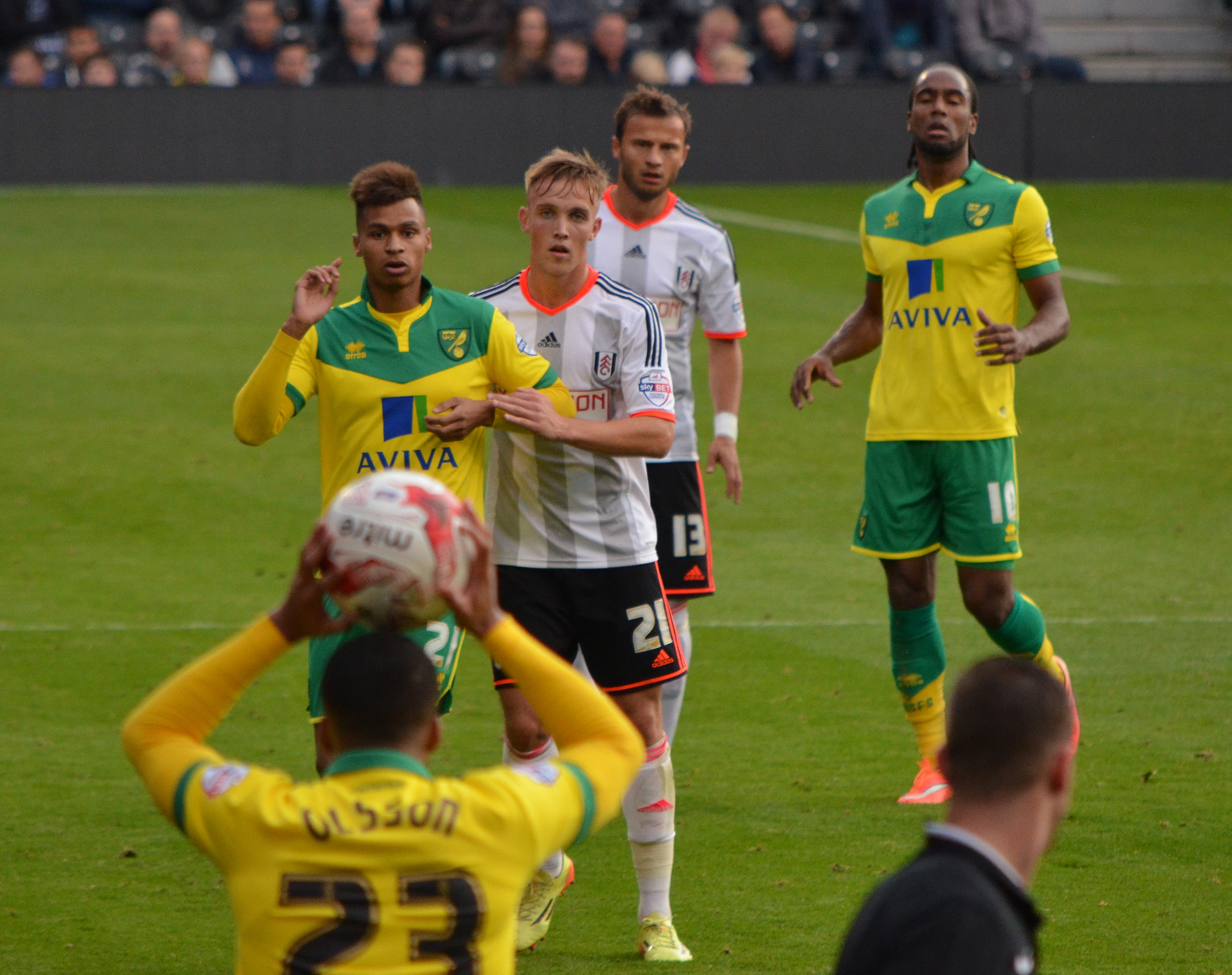
Vigen Christensen marking Norwich City's Josh Murphy in 2014.

Christensen made his Fulham debut in the FA Cup third round draw against Norwich City at Carrow Road and came on as a substitute for Steve Sidwell in the 84th minute during the replay at Craven Cottage. On 30 January 2014, Christensen signed a three-year contract extension, keeping him at Fulham until the summer of 2017.

The 2014–15 season saw Christensen being promoted to the first team and was featured more in the first team under the management of Kit Symons. He then scored his first goal for the club on 1 October 2014, in a 4–0 win over Bolton Wanderers. He then played a vital role, assisting three times against Norwich City, Rotherham United and Charlton Athletic, before scoring in a 3–3 draw against Wigan Athletic. By the end of 2014, Christensen added three more goals, putting his tally to 5, including against Sheffield Wednesday, for which named Man of the Match. However, he suffered a hamstring injury twice, including another that kept him out for the rest of the season. At the end of the 2014–15 season, Christensen made the total of 30 appearances and scoring fives times in all competitions. He finished third place in both the club's 2014–15 Player of the Season and the Goal of the Season awards.

In the 2015–16 season, Christensen continued to remain in the first team despite facing competitions and resulted being substituted on the bench. However, he suffered an injury during the international break and sidelined for a month. It wasn't until on 26 December 2015 when he returned to the first team, coming on as a second-half substitute, in a 2–0 loss against Derby County. He then scored again on 12 January 2016, in a 3–2 loss against Wolverhampton Wanderers. However, he was sidelined with a hamstring injury after sustaining into the first five minutes to the game against Queens Park Rangers on 13 February 2016. He then returned from the injury two months later on 9 April 2016 and set up a goal, in a 2–1 win over Cardiff City. At the end of the 2015–16 season, Christensen made the total of 31 appearances and scoring once in all competitions.

In the 2016–17 season, Christensen was featured in the first team at the start of the season and scored in a 3–2 win over Middlesbrough in the second round of the League Cup. Following a handful of first team football, he signed a one-year contract extension, keeping him until 2018. However, Christensen's first team opportunities was soon limited and was demoted to the club's reserve by the end of the year Whilst at Fulham, he went on to make the total of 7 appearances and scoring once in all competitions.

=== Burton Albion (loan) ===
On 27 January 2017, Christensen joined Burton Albion on loan until the end of the season, along with Cauley Woodrow.

The next day, Christensen made his debut for the club, where he made his first start, in a 2–1 win over Queens Park Rangers. After the match, he was named Team of the Week for the side. Since making his debut, Christensen established himself in the Burton Albion first team and was involved in a squad when they beat Leeds United on 22 April 2017, a win that helped his parent club's more hopes of reaching the play-off and Burton Albion's hopes of staying in the Championship for another season. At the end of the 2016–17 season, having made the total of 13 appearances, he, along with Woodrow, returned to their parent club.

=== Brøndby ===
On 18 July 2017, Christensen signed with Danish club Brøndby IF on a four-year contract. He was previously linked with a move to Sheffield United and Celtic over the summer.

Christensen had an immediate impact, scoring four goals in his first two Superliga games, including a debut goal in a 3–2 defeat to FC Nordsjælland and an off-the-bench hat–trick in a 5–3 win against Lyngby. For this feat, Christensen was named the July 2017 Superliga player of the month. Since making his debut for Brøndby IF, Christensen established himself in the starting eleven for the side. Two months later, on 20 September 2017, he scored again in a 5–1 win over Ledøje-Smørum Fodbold in the fifth round of the DBU Pokalen.

On 24 May 2021, Christensen scored Brøndby's first goal in their 2–0 win over FC Nordsjælland. The result confirmed Brøndby as Danish Superliga champions for the first time 16 years.

=== Zulte Waregem ===
On 21 June 2021, Christensen agreed to sign for Belgian First Division A club Zulte Waregem on a two-year contract starting 1 July. The deal included an option for an additional year. He made his debut for the club on 24 July in a 1–1 away draw against OH Leuven, playing the entire match.

=== Silkeborg ===
On 7 February 2023, Vigen signed a five-month contract with Danish Superliga club Silkeborg, joining the club on a free transfer. Vigen left Silkeborg at the end of the season, as his contract expired.

=== ADO Den Haag ===
On 4 September 2023, Vigen signed a two-year contract with Eerste Divisie club ADO Den Haag, joining the club on a free transfer. He was released from his contract by mutual consent on 4 February 2025.

=== Esbjerg fB ===
On 25 February 2025, Vigen returned to his childhood club, Danish 1st Division side Esbjerg fB, on a deal until 2027.

== International career ==
Christensen previously represented Denmark at youth levels. In August 2013, Christensen was called up by Denmark U21 for the first time. He scored his Denmark U21 debut on 10 September 2013, in a 2–2 draw against Slovenia U21. For the next two years, Christensen scored a brace on two occasions against Estonia U21 and Russia U21. He was then given a captain armband for the match against Germany U21 on 3 September 2015, in a 2–1 defeat.

In May 2016, Christensen expressed interest to be called up into the squad for Denmark at the 2016 Olympic Games in Rio de Janeiro. It came after when he was called by the national team. However, manager Slaviša Jokanović prevented this from happening, and told Christensen that "the club's needs were greater than his country's" and left Christensen disappointed.

In June 2015, Christensen was called up by the senior team for the first team and appeared as an unused substitute against Montenegro soon after.

== Career statistics ==
As of match played 3 December 2025

Appearances and goals by club, season and competition
Club	Season	League			National cup		League cup		Europe		Total	
Club	Season	Division	Apps	Goals	Apps	Goals	Apps	Goals	Apps	Goals	Apps	Goals
Fulham	2013–14	Premier League	0	0	2	0	0	0	—		2	0
Fulham	2014–15	Championship	25	5	3	0	1	0	—		29	5
Fulham	2015–16	Championship	27	1	1	0	2	0	—		30	1
Fulham	2016–17	Championship	4	0	0	0	3	1	—		7	1
Fulham	Total		56	6	6	0	6	1	0	0	68	7
Burton (loan)	2016–17	Championship	16	0	0	0	0	0	—		16	0
Brøndby	2017–18	Danish Superliga	32	6	4	2	—		2 (Note: Appearances in UEFA Europa League)	0	38	8
Brøndby	2018–19	Danish Superliga	25	1	3	0	—		4	0	32	1
Brøndby	2019–20	Danish Superliga	27	1	1	1	—		3	0	31	2
Brøndby	2020–21	Danish Superliga	27	4	1	0	—		—		28	4
Brøndby	Total		111	12	9	3	0	0	9	0	129	15
Zulte Waregem	2021–22	Belgian Pro League	20	0	2	0	—		—		22	0
Zulte Waregem	2022–23	Belgian Pro League	11	0	2	0	—		—		13	0
Zulte Waregem	Total		31	0	4	0	—		—		35	0
Silkeborg	2022–23	Danish Superliga	14	0	3	0	—		—		17	0
ADO Den Haag	2023–24	Eerste Divisie	20	2	2	0	—		3 (Note: Appearances in Eredivisie promotion playoffs)	0	25	2
ADO Den Haag	2024–25	Eerste Divisie	7	0	1	0	—		—		8	0
ADO Den Haag	Total		27	0	3	0	—		3	0	33	0
Esbjerg fB	2024–25	Danish 1st Division	7	0	—		—		—		7	0
Esbjerg fB	2025–26	Danish 1st Division	18	1	3	0	—		—		21	1
Esbjerg fB	Total		25	1	3	0	—		—		28	1
Career total			280	21	28	3	6	1	12	0	318	25

== Personal life ==
Christensen grew up supporting Premier League side Arsenal, whom he went on a trial early in his career. Christensen said he wanted to be a footballer when he grows up and revealed that his father, a footballer, once played for the Denmark U21 side.

== Honours ==
Brøndby

- Danish Superliga: 2020–21
- Danish Cup: 2017–18
