= Rezan Corlu =

Danish footballer (born 1997)

Personal information
- Full name: Rezan Çorlu
- Date of birth: 7 August 1997 (age 29)
- Place of birth: Glostrup, Denmark
- Height: 1.70 m (5 ft 7 in)
- Position: Winger

Team information
- Current team: Hillerød
- Number: 19

Youth career
- 2003–2015: Brøndby

Senior career*
Years	Team	Apps	(Gls)
2015–2017	Brøndby	5	(0)
2017–2019	Roma	0	(0)
2018–2019	→ Lyngby (loan)	19	(3)
2019–2021	Brøndby	13	(0)
2019–2020	→ Lyngby (loan)	27	(8)
2021–2025	Lyngby	58	(2)
2025	Kristiansund	26	(4)
2026–	Hillerød	6	(0)

International career
2012–2013	Denmark U16	11	(6)
2013–2014	Denmark U17	11	(6)
2014–2015	Denmark U19	11	(3)
2016–2017	Denmark U20	4	(0)
- * Club domestic league appearances and goals as of 2 June 2026

Rezan Çorlu (born 7 August 1997) is a Danish professional footballer who plays as an attacking midfielder or a winger for Danish 1st Division club Hillerød.

== Club career ==
=== Brøndby ===
Born in Glostrup, Denmark to Kurdish parents from Central Anatolia, Corlu started playing for the Brøndby youth academy at age six, where his older brother, Azad Çorlu, already played.

In June 2015, at the age of 17, Corlu was promoted to the first team. He made his professional debut for the club a month later, on 2 July 2015, starting on the bench, but replacing Lebogang Phiri in the 63rd minute in a 9–0 win over Sammarinese club Juvenes/Dogana in the Europa League qualification. He also scored the 8th goal of the 9–0 victory, netting in the 66th minute. Corlu made his debut in the Danish Superliga a few weeks later, on 26 July 2015, in a match against OB. Corlu came on in the 67nd minute, replacing Andrew Hjulsager. A month later, in August 2015, he played a reserve match for Brøndby against FC Copenhagen, where he tore a ligament in his knee, keeping him out for the entirety of the 2015–16 season.

=== Roma ===
On 1 August 2017, Corlu signed for Italian club Roma. There, he was initially placed in the under-19 team.

==== Loans to Lyngby ====
After one season in Roma without any first-team appearances, Corlu joined Danish second tier club Lyngby Boldklub on a one-year loan deal on 5 July 2018. In the 2018–19 season, he made 19 appearances and three goals as Lyngby won promotion to the Danish Superliga.

On 21 June 2019, Corlu signed with his former club, Brøndby, and was loaned out directly to Lyngby again, who meanwhile had achieved promotion to the Danish Superliga. After an impressive first half of the 2019–20 season, Brøndby extended his contract one extra year, until 2023.

=== Return to Brøndby ===
Corlu returned to Brøndby on 3 August 2020. He made his debut on 27 September in a 2–1 win against AC Horsens. He had an unfortunate start to his second spell with Brøndby, suffering an injury in a match against OB on 8 November which kept him sidelined for one month. Upon his return, he tested positive for SARS-CoV-2 during the COVID-19 pandemic which effectively ended his autumn season. Besides health issues, Jesper Lindstrøm had emerged as a key player in his position, keeping Corlu on the bench.

In the pre-season friendlies, Corlu received more playing time. However, when the season began Corlu was mostly benched.

=== Return to Lyngby ===
On 31 August 2021, shortly before midnight on deadline day, Corlu signed a three-year contract with Lyngby. He made his debut the following day, on 1 September, in a 5–1 win over Tårnby FF in the Danish Cup.

Corlu suffered a serious knee injury, later confirmed as a meniscus tear, during a friendly against Næstved Boldklub on 13 January 2024. The injury ended his season early, but his contract with Lyngby was extended on 25 February, keeping him at the club until 2025.

=== Kristiansund ===
On 19 February 2025 it was confirmed that Corlu joined Norwegian Eliteserien club Kristiansund on a deal until the end of 2026.

On 6 January 2026, Kristiansund confirmed that the parties had terminated the contract six months early.

=== Hillerød ===
On 3 February 2026, Corlu signed with Danish 1st Division club Hillerød on a contract until June 2028.

== International career ==
Since his debut on 2 October 2012 for the Denmark national under-16 team in a friendly in Kladno against the Czech Republic, he gained a total of 37 caps for Danish youth national teams, in which he scored 15 goals.

== Career statistics ==
As of match played 1 June 2025

Appearances and goals by club, season and competition
Club	Season	League			Cup		Europe		Total	
Club	Season	Division	Apps	Goals	Apps	Goals	Apps	Goals	Apps	Goals
Brøndby	2014–15	Superliga	0	0	0	0	—		0	0
Brøndby	2015–16	Superliga	1	0	0	0	2	1	3	1
Brøndby	2016–17	Superliga	4	0	1	0	2	0	7	0
Brøndby	Total		5	0	1	0	4	1	10	1
Roma	2017–18	Serie A	0	0	—		—		0	0
Roma	2018–19	Serie A	0	0	—		—		0	0
Roma	Total		0	0	0	0	0	0	0	0
Lyngby (loan)	2018–19	1st Division	19	3	—		—		19	3
Brøndby	2020–21	Superliga	10	0	0	0	—		10	0
Brøndby	2021–22	Superliga	3	0	0	0	—		3	0
Brøndby	Total		13	0	0	0	0	0	13	0
Lyngby (loan)	2019–20	Superliga	27	8	—		—		27	8
Lyngby	2021–22	1st Division	23	0	1	0	—		24	0
Lyngby	2022–23	Superliga	26	2	1	0	—		27	2
Lyngby	2023–24	Superliga	8	0	4	1	—		12	1
Lyngby	2024–25	Superliga	1	0	0	0	—		1	0
Lyngby	Total		85	10	6	1	0	0	91	11
Kristiansund	2025	Eliteserien	11	1	1	0	—		12	1
Career total			133	14	8	1	4	1	145	16

== Honours ==
Brøndby

- Danish Superliga: 2020–21
