= Kasper Fisker =

Danish footballer (born 1988)

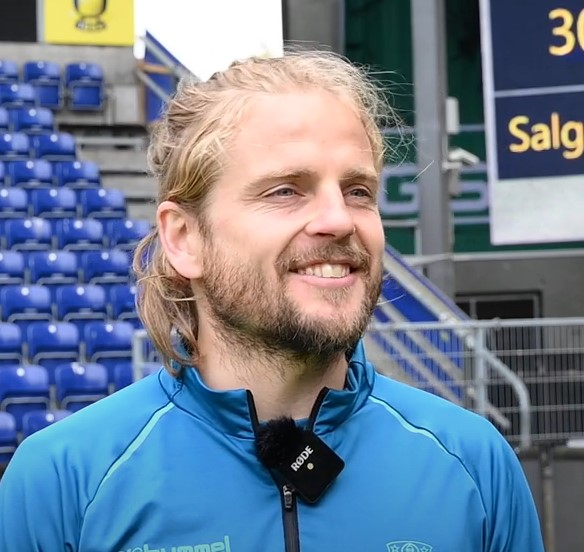
- Fisker in 2020

Personal information
- Full name: Kasper Fisker Jensen
- Date of birth: 22 May 1988 (age 38)
- Place of birth: Nørager, Denmark
- Height: 1.70 m (5 ft 7 in)
- Position: Midfielder

Youth career
- 1991–2000: Nørager Boldklub
- 2000–2007: Randers Freja

Senior career*
| Years | Team | Apps | (Gls) |
| 2006–2007 | Randers | 1 | (0) |
| 2007 | → Skive (loan) | | |
| 2008–2009 | Skive | | |
| 2008 | → Hobro (loan) | 15 | (5) |
| 2009–2013 | Hobro | 153 | (24) |
| 2014–2017 | Randers | 99 | (8) |
| 2017–2020 | Brøndby | 51 | (2) |
| 2020–2021 | Fremad Amager | 18 | (1) |
- * Club domestic league appearances and goals

Kasper Fisker Jensen (Danish: [ˈkʰæspɐ ˈfe̝skɐ]; born 22 May 1988) is a Danish former professional footballer who played as a midfielder.

Predominantly a central midfielder, Fisker started his career at local Superliga-side Randers FC before spending two seasons at Skive IK, first on loan and since on a permanent deal. He signed for Hobro IK in 2009, where he helped the team reach successive promotions from the third to the first tier while establishing himself as one of the best midfielders in the Danish 1st Division, which resulted in him winning 1st Division Player of the Year in 2013. Fisker returned to Randers in January 2014, playing three years for his childhood club before moving to Brøndby IF in 2017 where he won the Danish Cup in his first season. He retired in March 2021 as part of Fremad Amager.

== Career ==
=== Randers ===
Born in Nørager, Norddjurs Municipality, Fisker played as a youth for local football club Nørager Boldklub, before joining Randers Freja, a feeder club for Randers FC, at the age of 12. After having progressed through the Randers Freja youth system, Fisker was promoted to the Randers FC first team in January 2005. He made his debut against Vejle Boldklub two years later, before moving to Skive IK on loan in July 2007, having played only the one match for the first team in Randers. Eventually, he signed a permanent deal with the club after his loan spell had ended in December 2007. However, he would mainly play for the Skive second team who were competing in the Danish Series 1, the sixth tier of the Danish football league system and the second-highest tier of the regional DBU Jutland association.

=== Hobro ===
==== 2009–2011 ====
After two seasons in Skive, Fisker signed a one-year contract with Hobro IK on 29 June 2009, a club which at that time competed in the Danish 2nd Division, the third tier of the Danish football league system. The deal was signed after he had spent six months on loan at Hobro from Skive. Fisker helped Hobro reach promotion to the Danish 1st Division, the second national tier, in his first season at the club, scoring a crucial goal against B.93 in one of the promotion play-off games. During the season, Fisker mainly played as a winger.

As his contract expired in June 2010, Fisker had initially agreed to a contract with Viborg FF, but eventually chose to sign a one-year contract extension with Hobro. He helped Hobro stay in the league in the 2010–11 season, as the club finished 12th in the league table; 3 points from Kolding FC in the relegation spots. As a result, Fisker's contract was extended until December 2013.

==== 2011–2014 ====
In the 2011–12 season, Fisker and Hobro sought once more to consolidate themselves in the second tier. An injury in January 2012 on the account of a hyperextended knee, kept him out for the start of the spring season. The club, however, managed to avoid relegation comfortably by ending in eight place in the league table, six points from FC Roskilde in the relegations spots.

The following season, Hobro struggled after a strong start to the season, eventually ending in ninth place, only one point from Fisker's former team Skive IK in the relegation spot. Fisker finished the season with six goals in 27 appearances.

Fisker played six more months for Hobro, after having agreed to a contract with Randers FC beginning as of January 2014. He had a strong finish to his career in the club, helping Hobro to first place in the table by the winter break, while personally winning 1st Division Player of the Year for 2013.

=== Return to Randers ===
==== 2014–2015 ====
Fisker signed with childhood club Randers FC in July 2013, with a contract beginning from January 2014, marking his return to the club since leaving them in December 2007. He signed a two-year contract. On 23 February 2014, Fisker made his first appearance for Randers since returning, starting in a 1–1 draw in the Superliga match against Viborg FF. He quickly established himself in the first team following strong outings and goals against F.C. Copenhagen and FC Vestsjælland during the spring of 2014. In the former, he secured a 1–1 draw for Randers. He scored two goals in his first half season in the club and made 15 total appearances, as Randers ended seventh in the league table after a strong finish to the season.

In March 2015, Fisker signed four-year contract extension with Randers and stated that he hoped to continue playing top-flight football for the club for years to come. He finished the season with 30 appearances in which he scored one goal, as the club ended fourth in the league table and thereby secured a place in the first qualifying round of the Europa League in the following season.

==== 2015–2016 ====
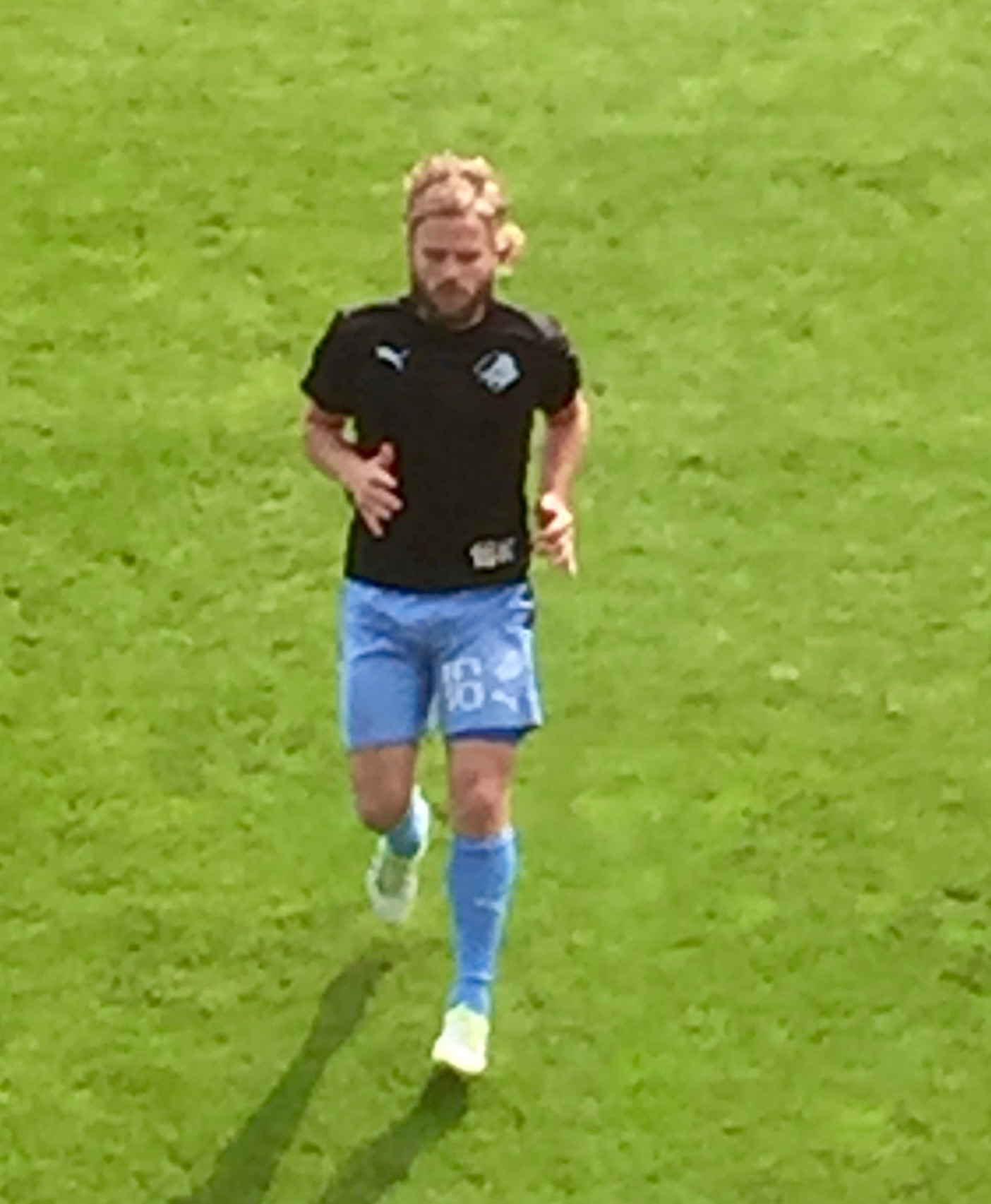
Fisker warming up for Randers in 2016.

Fisker missed the start of the 2015–16 season and his European debut against Andorran side UE Sant Julià due to a pulled calf muscle. He made his comeback in a 2–3 loss to rivals AGF on 2 August, where he came on as a substitute in the 80th minute but was sent off six minutes later after elbowing Danny Olsen. His mixed start to the season continued and he was benched for a number of matches after his suspension, before making his return as a starter in a 6–0 win over Danish fourth tier club FC Sønderborg in a Danish Cup matchup on 24 September, in which he scored two goals. In the league, Fisker made his return as a starter on 3 October in a win over his former club Hobro. He continued as a starter for Randers in their first game after the winter break, a 1–1 draw against SønderjyskE on 27 February 2016, marking his only third start of the season. After the game, Randers head coach Colin Todd praised Fisker for his ambition, noting that he had seen a reaction from Fisker after having been sidelined for large parts of the first half of the season. Personal drama marked the Randers first team during large parts of the spring season, after Jonas Borring's wife, Kira Egsgaard Borring, had left the latter after becoming involved with Christian Keller, who had that point was club captain for Randers. As a result, Borring left the club after stating that Keller had "completely stabbed me in the back." Later, Keller was suspended from the team. Talking about the episode, Fisker stated that "[w]e are not affected by what has happened outside the pitch. On the contrary, we have been bound together. We've talked a lot about what's happened. It has almost worked as a form of team building." Despite the tumultuous season, Randers finished sixth in the league table, while Fisker made 24 total appearances in which he scored four goals.

==== 2016–2017 ====
In August 2016, Fisker signed a five-year contract, extending his deal which ran to 2019 another two years. He played a key role for Randers during the 2016–17 season under new head coach Ólafur Kristjánsson, who had replaced outgoing manager Colin Todd prior to the season. Fisker finished the season with 38 total appearances in which he scored two goals, as Randers ended seventh in the league table and were knocked out by FC Midtjylland in the European play-off final by losing 0–3.

=== Brøndby ===
==== 2017–2019 ====
On 26 June 2017, Fisker joined Brøndby IF in a deal worth DKK 2.5 million, signing a three-year contract. He made his debut for Brøndby on 13 July in the UEFA Europa League play-off round first leg home against VPS of Finland, a 2–0 win. On 10 May 2018, Fisker made an appearance as Brøndby beat Silkeborg IF 3–1 in the 2017–18 Danish Cup final.

A foot injury suffered during the 2018–19 season ruled Fisker out for 10–12 weeks. He finished an injury-affected 2018–19 season with 10 league appearances and no goals.

==== 2019–2020 ====
Fisker made his comeback for Brøndby on 11 July 2019, coming on as a substitute in the first leg of their UEFA Europa League qualification round against Finnish club Inter Turku in which he scored off a deflection in a 4–1 win. On 25 August, in a 3–0 defeat against AGF, Fisker suffered a cruciate ligament tear and was substituted in the first half. The injury resulted in him being ruled out for an extended period of time which cast a doubt on whether he would be offered a contract extension, as it was set to expire in June 2020. Fisker, as a result of the speculation, stated that he did not want to be pitied, and that he still expected to return for one more match. Due to the temporary suspension of the 2019–20 Superliga season as a result of the COVID-19 pandemic in Denmark, chances of him making a comeback increased and finally, on 26 May 2020, Fisker made his return in a friendly against Hvidovre IF. On 10 July, he made his official comeback in the Superliga to a standing ovation from Brøndby's fans in a 4–0 home win over FC Nordsjælland. On 21 July, Brøndby's director of football Carsten V. Jensen revealed that Fisker would be leaving the club at the end of the Superliga campaign.

=== Fremad Amager ===
On 22 August 2020, Fisker signed with Danish 1st Division (second-tier) club Fremad Amager, a signing which was announced on the club's Twitter account. He made his debut for the club a week later, on 1 September, in a 3–1 Danish Cup win over B.1908.

On 17 March 2021, Fisker announced his retirement from football due to recurring knee issues.

== Style of play ==
Throughout his career, Fisker has mainly played as a central midfielder, although he was also employed as a winger during his tenures at Hobro IK and Randers FC. Despite not being particularly tall, he is a physically strong, consistent, aggressive, and hard-tackling midfielder, with an extremely high work rate, which eventually caught the eye of German manager Alexander Zorniger at Brøndby IF. Practicing the defensive tactic of Gegenpressing, Fisker's aggressive style, combined with an excellent positional sense, good anticipation and a strong left foot, was strongly suited for the team's style of play.

== Personal life ==
While playing amateur football at Hobro IK, Fisker owned a hostel in his home town, Nørager.

Since 2015, Fisker has been married to blogger Stephanie Bak after proposing to her on a holiday in Jamaica. The couple have two children, Elva and Baldur.

In 2020, as Fisker was recovering from injury, he told in an interview with Spillerforeningen, the union for professional footballers in Denmark, that he had been prescribed antidepressants and sleep medicine during his injury.

== Honours ==
Hobro

- Danish 2nd Division promotion play-offs: 2010

Brøndby

- Danish Cup: 2017–18

Individual

- Danish 1st Division Player of the Year: 2013
