= Christian Enemark =

Danish footballer (born 1999)

Personal information
- Full name: Christian Enemark
- Date of birth: 20 January 1999 (age 27)
- Place of birth: Køge, Denmark
- Height: 1.83 m (6 ft 0 in)
- Position: Centre-back

Team information
- Current team: Hobro
- Number: 3

Youth career
- Herfølge
- –2015: HB Køge
- 2015–2018: Brøndby

Senior career*
Years	Team	Apps	(Gls)
2017–2019	Brøndby	2	(0)
2018–2019	→ HB Køge (loan)	19	(0)
2019–2020	Næstved	29	(0)
2020–2021	AB	26	(2)
2021–2024	Næstved	86	(0)
2024–2025	Kolding	15	(0)
2025–	Hobro	14	(0)
2025	→ Östersunds FK (loan)	27	(0)

International career
2014–2015	Denmark U16	4	(0)
2015–2016	Denmark U17	11	(0)
2017	Denmark U18	1	(0)
2018	Denmark U19	1	(0)
- * Club domestic league appearances and goals as of 2 June 2026

Christian Enemark (born 20 January 1999) is a Danish professional footballer who plays as centre-back for Danish 1st Division club Hobro IK.

== Career ==
=== Brøndby ===
Born in Køge, Enemark started playing football at Herfølge Boldklub, the mother club of HB Køge, and was promoted to HB Køge's U17 squad although he was a U15 player. On 15 January 2015, he was sold to Brøndby IF at the age of 15.

On 21 May 2017, Enemark made his official debut for Brøndby IF in a match against SønderjyskE where he played the entire game at right-back. The club announced on 8 January 2018, that Enemark had been permanently promoted to the first team together with goalkeeper Casper Hauervig. Enemark normal position was at centre back but he was promoted because the first team was missing a right back.

==== HB Køge (loan) ====
On 3 August 2018, Enemark was loaned out to his childhood club, HB Køge, in the second-tier 1st Division until the end of the season. Enemark had not made many appearances for Brøndby due to tough competition in defense. At the end of his loan spell at HB Køge, it was announced that Enemark would not receive a permanent contract with the club because the coaching staff failed to agree on the position in which he would be utilised. Enemark saw himself as a centre back, while the club wanted to use him as a right back.

On 7 June 2019, Brøndby announced that Enemark would leave the club following the return from his loan spell at HB Køge, as his contract with the club expired.

=== Næstved ===
On 11 June 2019, it was confirmed, that Enemark had joined 1st Division club Næstved Boldklub.

=== AB ===
On 29 August 2020, Enemark moved to Akademisk Boldklub (AB) in the third-tier 2nd Division. There, he was appointed vice-captain and gained the award of "Player of the Year".

=== Return to Næstved ===
In June 2021, it was announced that Enemark would return to Næstved.

=== Kolding IF ===
On 10 June 2024, recently promoted Danish 1st Division side Kolding IF confirmed that Enemark had signed a contract until June 2026. He made his debut for the club on 19 July, replacing Casper Jørgensen in the 95th minute of a 0–0 away draw against B.93 at Østerbro Stadium.

=== Hobro IK ===
On 31 January 2025 the Danish 1st Division club Hobro IK confirmed that Enemark joined the club on a deal until the end of 2026. But due to an error with his player certificate, he was not registered, and Hobro IK had to loan him out to Swedish Superettan side Östersunds FK until 30 June 2025. On 27 June 2025, it was announced the loan-deal was extended until 31 December 2025.
