= 2016–17 Brøndby IF season =

Brøndby
2016–17 season
- Sports Director: Troels Bech
- Head Coach: Alexander Zorniger
- Ground: Brøndby Stadium
- Danish Superliga: 2nd
- Danish Cup: Third round
- UEFA Europa League: Play-off round
- Top goalscorer: League: Teemu Pukki (20); All: Teemu Pukki (29)
Home colours	Away colours	Third colours

The 2016–17 season was Brøndby's 36th consecutive season in the top flight of Danish football, 27th consecutive season in the Danish Superliga, and 51st year in existence as a football club. In addition to the Danish Superliga, the club also competed in the Danish Cup and the UEFA Europa League. The season was the club's first with manager Alexander Zorniger.

== Club ==
=== First team coaching staff ===
Position	Staff
Head coach	(Germany) Alexander Zorniger
Assistant coach	(Hungary) Tamás Bódog
Assistant coach	(Denmark) Mark Strudal
Goalkeeping coach	(Denmark) Jan Hoffmann

Last updated: 18 August 2016.

=== Club administration ===
Position	Staff
Sports director	(Denmark) Troels Bech
Team manager	(Denmark) Thomas Andersen
Kit manager	(Denmark) Leif Mortensen
First team scout	(Denmark) John Møller

Last updated: 18 August 2016.

== Players ==
=== First team ===
As of 12 September 2016

Note: Flags indicate national team as defined under FIFA eligibility rules; some limited exceptions apply. Players may hold more than one non-FIFA nationality.

No.	Pos.	Nation	Player
1	GK	DEN	Frederik Rønnow
2	DF	KOR	Yun Suk-young
4	DF	GER	Benedikt Röcker
5	DF	DEN	Martin Albrechtsen
6	DF	ISL	Hjörtur Hermannsson
7	MF	DEN	Thomas Kahlenberg (captain)
8	MF	JAM	Rodolph Austin
9	FW	FIN	Teemu Pukki
10	MF	GER	Hany Mukhtar (on loan from Benfica)
12	MF	DEN	Frederik Holst
13	DF	SWE	Johan Larsson (vice-captain)
15	FW	CRC	Marco Ureña
16	GK	DEN	Mads Toppel

No.	Pos.	Nation	Player
17	MF	DEN	Rezan Corlu
18	MF	RSA	Lebogang Phiri
19	MF	DEN	Christian Nørgaard
20	FW	POL	Kamil Wilczek
21	MF	DEN	Andrew Hjulsager
22	FW	SWE	Gustaf Nilsson
23	DF	DEN	Patrick da Silva
24	FW	DEN	Daniel Stückler
25	MF	DEN	Christian Jakobsen
27	DF	DEN	Svenn Crone
29	FW	CZE	Jan Kliment (on loan from Stuttgart)
30	GK	DEN	Viktor Anker
35	FW	PAR	José Ariel Núñez

=== Transfers ===
==== In ====
No.	Pos.	Player	Transferred from	Type	Date	Fee	Source
35	FW	Ariel Nuñez (PAR)	Olimpia	End of loan	1 July 2016		
22	FW	Gustaf Nilsson (SWE)	Falkenbergs FF	Transfer	1 July 2016		
11	MF	Jonas Borring (DEN)	Randers FC	Transfer	1 July 2016	Free	
4	DF	Benedikt Röcker (GER)	Greuther Fürth	Transfer	1 July 2016		
6	DF	Hjörtur Hermannsson (ISL)	PSV Eindhoven	Transfer	1 July 2016		
10	MF	Hany Mukhtar (GER)	S.L.Benfica	Loan	20 July 2016		
15	FW	Marco Ureña (CRC)	FC Midtjylland	Transfer	21 July 2016		
29	FW	Jan Kliment (CZE)	VfB Stuttgart	Loan	31 August 2016		
2	DF	Yun Suk-young (KOR)	Free agent	Transfer	12 September 2016	Free	

Last updated: 12 September 2016.

Source: brondby.com

==== Out ====
No.	Pos	Player	Transferred to	Type	Date	Fee	Source
11	FW	Johan Elmander (SWE)	Örgyte IS	End of contract	1 July 2016		
22	DF	Daniel Agger (DEN)	Retired	End of contract	1 July 2016		
	DF	Malthe Johansen (DEN)	Retired	End of contract	1 July 2016		
		Andreas Hansen (DEN)	Free agent	End of contract	1 July 2016		
6	MF	Martin Ørnskov (DEN)	Lyngby BK	End of contract	1 July 2016		
17	DF	Riza Durmisi (DEN)	Real Betis	Transfer	1 July 2016		
10	MF	Magnus Eriksson (SWE)	Djurgårdens IF	Transfer	1 July 2016		
15	MF	David Boysen (DEN)	Roda JC	Transfer	1 July 2016		
11	MF	Jonas Borring (DEN)	FC Midtjylland	Transfer	21 July 2016		
		Mads Juel Andersen (DEN)	HB Køge	Loan	2016 (summer)		
2	DF	Jesper Juelsgård (DEN)	AGF	Transfer	31 August 2016		

Last updated: 1 September 2016.

Source: brondby.com

== Competitions ==
=== Overview ===
Competition	Record							
Competition	G	W	D	L	GF	GA	GD	Win %
Danish Superliga	12	6	4	2	30	11	+19	50.00
Danish Cup	0	0	0	0	0	0	+0	—
Europa League	8	4	1	3	15	8	+7	50.00
Total	20	10	5	5	45	19	+26	50.00

Updated to match played 2 October 2016.
Source: Competitions

=== Danish Superliga ===
==== Main round ====
Pos	Team	Pld	W	D	L	GF	GA	GD	Pts	Qualification
1	Copenhagen	26	19	7	0	57	10	+47	64	Qualification for the championship round
2	Brøndby	26	15	7	4	52	23	+29	52	Qualification for the championship round
3	Lyngby	26	11	6	9	25	23	+2	39	Qualification for the championship round
4	SønderjyskE	26	10	9	7	30	32	−2	39	Qualification for the championship round
5	Midtjylland	26	10	8	8	44	29	+15	38	Qualification for the championship round

Source: DBU, Soccerway
Rules for classification: 1) Points; 2) Goal difference; 3) Goals scored; 4) Away goals scored; 5) Play-off (played on neutral ground if determining teams for different rounds); 6) Draw.

==== Results summary ====
Overall								Home						Away					
Pld	W	D	L	GF	GA	GD	Pts	W	D	L	GF	GA	GD	W	D	L	GF	GA	GD
26	15	7	4	52	23	+29	52	8	3	2	30	14	+16	7	4	2	22	9	+13

Last updated: 19 March 2017.

Source: brondby.com

==== Results by round ====
Round	1	2	3	4	5	6	7	8	9	10	11	12	13	14	15	16	17	18	19	20	21	22	23	24	25	26	27	28	29	30	31	32	33	34	35	36
Ground	H	A	H	A	H	A	H	A	H	A	H	H	A	H	H	A	A	H	A	A	H	A	A	H	A	H	H	A	H	A	H	A	A	H	A	H
Result	W	W	D	D	W	W	D	W	L	L	W	D	D	W	W	W	L	W	W	D	W	D	W	L	W	W	W	W	L	W	D	L	L	L	L	L

Updated to match(es) played on 28 May 2017. Source: 2016-17 Danish Superliga
A = Away; H = Home; W = Win; D = Draw; L = Loss

==== Matches ====
Win Draw Loss

17 July 2016 1	Brøndby IF	4–0	Esbjerg fB	Brøndby
18:00 CEST	Pukki 24'; Wilczek 42'; Hjulsager 46'; Holst 49'		Laursen (yellow card) 19'	Stadium: Brøndby Stadium; Attendance: 10,397; Referee: Lars Christoffersen

24 July 2016 2	Silkeborg IF	0–2	Brøndby IF	Silkeborg
16:00 CEST	Lyng (yellow card) 75'	Report	Hjulsager 20', (yellow card) 38'; Holst 49'	Stadium: Mascot Park; Attendance: 4,902; Referee: Dennis Mogensen

31 July 2016 3	Brøndby IF	2–2	AC Horsens	Brøndby
16:00 CEST	Hjulsager 21'; Wilczek 52'		O'Brien (yellow card) 21'; Finnbogason 58'; Aabech 82'	Stadium: Brøndby Stadium; Attendance: 12,136; Referee: Jens Maae

7 August 2016 4	FC Midtjylland	3–3	Brøndby IF	Herning
18:00 CEST	Onuachu 66'; Poulsen 86' (pen.), 89' (pen.)		Juelsgaard (yellow card) 13'; Pukki 40', 76', 79'; Crone (yellow card) 54'; Holst (yellow card) 73'	Stadium: MCH Arena; Attendance: 8,889; Referee: Jakob Kehlet

14 August 2016 5	Brøndby IF	4–0	SønderjyskE	Brøndby
18:00 CEST	Pukki 31', 68'; Hermannsson 33'; Wilczek 53'		Ritter (yellow card) 75'	Stadium: Brøndby Stadium; Attendance: 9,442; Referee: Peter Kjærsgaard-Andersen

21 August 2016 6	AGF	0–7	Brøndby IF	Aarhus
16:00 CEST	Khodzhaniyazov (red card) 15'; Mikanovic (yellow card) 46'		Wilczek 24'; Backman 39' (o.g.); Hjulsager 41', 68'; Mukhtar 45+2'; Pukki 47' (pen.), 63'	Stadium: Atletion; Attendance: 13,658; Referee: Mads-Kristoffer Kristoffersen

28 August 2016 7	Brøndby IF	1–1	Copenhagen	Brøndby
16:00 CEST	Wilczek (yellow card) 64'; Hjulsager 68'; Hermannsson (yellow card) 79'; Crone (yellow card) 88'		Pavlović 45'; Johansson (yellow card) 60'; Zanka (yellow card) 76'; Delaney (yellow card) 90+3'	Stadium: Brøndby Stadium; Attendance: 23,518; Referee: Jens Maae

11 September 2016 8	AaB	0–1	Brøndby IF	Aalborg
18:00 CEST			Wilczek 8'; Nørgaard (yellow card) 19'; Hjulsager (yellow card) 40'	Stadium: Nordjyske Arena; Attendance: 11,727; Referee: Michael Tykgaard

18 September 2016 9	Brøndby IF	1–2	Viborg	Brøndby
16:00 CEST	Röcker (yellow card) 2'; Wilczek 51'; Nørgaard (yellow card) 58'		Rask 42'; Fochive (yellow card) 45+2'; Deble (yellow card) 68'; Larsson 81' (o.g.)	Stadium: Brøndby Stadium; Attendance: 15,778; Referee: Anders Poulsen

22 September 2016 10	Lyngby BK	1–0	Brøndby IF	Lyngby
20:00 CEST	Kjær 43'; Munksgaard (yellow card) 57'; Gytkjær (yellow card) 70'; Lumb (yellow card) 77'		Greko (yellow card) 48'; Hermannsson (yellow card) 70'	Stadium: Lyngby Stadion; Attendance: 7,073; Referee: Lars Christoffersen

25 September 2016 11	Brøndby IF	3–0	OB	Brøndby
16:00 CEST	Nørgaard 19'; Mukhtar 45+3'; Holst (yellow card) 75'; Pukki 77'; Hjulsager (yellow card) 82'		Lund (yellow card) 9'; Tingager (yellow card) 68'	Stadium: Brøndby Stadium; Attendance: 13,147; Referee: Jørgen Daugbjerg

2 October 2016 12	Brøndby IF	2–2	Randers FC	Brøndby
18:00 CEST	Wilczek 2'; Mukhtar 37', (yellow card) 40'; Holst (yellow card) 43'; Kliment (yellow card) 49'		Kallesøe 53'; Ishak 62', (yellow card) 67'	Stadium: Brøndby Stadium; Attendance: 10,695; Referee: Peter Kjærsgaard-Andersen

16 October 2016 13	Nordsjælland	1–1	Brøndby IF	Farum
16:00	Donyoh 55' (yellow card) 75'; Fellah (yellow card) 69'	Summary	Wilczek (yellow card) 33'; Mukhtar (yellow card) 34'; Röcker (yellow card) 38'; Kliment 83'	Stadium: Farum Park; Attendance: 5,426; Referee: (Denmark) Mads-Kristoffer Kristoffersen

23 October 2016 14	Brøndby IF	1–0	AGF	Brøndby
18:00	Röcker (yellow card) 40'; Mukhtar 55'	Summary	Bjarnason (yellow card) 16'; Mikanović (yellow card) 41'	Stadium: Brøndby Stadium; Attendance: 10,175; Referee: (Denmark) Anders Poulsen (referee)

30 October 2016 15	Brøndby IF	2–0	AaB	Brøndby
16:00	Pukki 4' (pen.); Crone (yellow card) 12'; Wilczek 61'	Summary		Stadium: Brøndby Stadium; Attendance: 12,517; Referee: (Denmark) Lars Christoffersen

6 November 2016 16	Viborg FF	1–2	Brøndby IF	Viborg
16:00	Sivebæk 47'; Friis Jensen (yellow card) 76'	Summary	Wilczek 6'; Hjulsager 72'	Stadium: Energi Viborg Arena; Attendance: 4,311; Referee: (Denmark) Michael Tykgaard

20 November 2016 17	OB	1–0	Brøndby IF	Odense
16:00	Jacobsen 42'; João Pereira (yellow card) 70'; El Makrini (yellow card) 76'; Dieudonne (yellow card) 90+2'	Summary	Nørgaard (yellow card) 38'; Hjulsager (yellow card) 62'	Stadium: EWII Park; Attendance: 5,815; Referee: (Denmark) Jens Maae

27 November 2016 18	Brøndby IF	3–1	Silkeborg IF	Brøndby
18:00	Mukhtar (yellow card) 21' (goal) 23'; Pukki 66'; Wilczek 69'; Austin (yellow card) 71'	Summary	Helenius 58'	Stadium: Brøndby Stadium; Attendance: 7,757; Referee: (Denmark) Michael Tykgaard

30 November 2016 19	Randers FC	0–1	Brøndby IF	Randers
20:00		Summary	Jakobsen 85'	Stadium: AutoC Park Randers; Attendance: 5,259; Referee: (Denmark) Mads-Kristoffer Kristoffersen

4 December 2016 20	Esbjerg fB	1–1	Brøndby IF	Esbjerg
16:00	Söder 51'; Pálsson (yellow card) 73'	Summary	Holst (yellow card) 22'; Pukki 63'; Hjulsager (yellow card) 67'	Stadium: Blue Water Arena; Attendance: 5,096; Referee: (Denmark) Michael Johansen

11 December 2016 21	Brøndby IF	2–1	FC Midtjylland	Brøndby
18:00	Pukki 25' 79'	Summary	van der Vaart 43'; Onuachu (yellow card) 65'	Stadium: Brøndby Stadium; Attendance: 11,061; Referee: (Denmark) Mads kristoffer Kristoffersen

19 February 2017 22	Copenhagen	0–0	Brøndby IF	Copenhagen
13:30	Cornelius (yellow card) 19'; Santander (yellow card) 39'; Okore (yellow card) 63'; Jørgensen (yellow card) 88'	Report	Pukki (yellow card) 41'; Röcker (yellow card) 59'; Sikošek (yellow card) 62'; Nørgaard (yellow card) 63'	Stadium: Telia Parken; Attendance: 27,686; Referee: (Denmark) Jakob Kehlet

26 February 2017 23	SønderjyskE	1–2	Brøndby IF	Haderslev
18:00	Uhre 20'; Ramón (yellow card) 41'; Mattila (yellow card) 73'; Absalonsen (yellow card) 87'	Report	Pukki 21' (pen.); Nørgaard 25' (yellow card) 32'; Larsson (yellow card) 79'	Stadium: Sydbank Park; Attendance: 6,038; Referee: (Denmark) Jørgen Daugbjerg Burchardt

5 March 2017 24	Brøndby IF	2–3	Nordsjælland	Brøndby
18:00	Mukhtar 12'; Sikošek (yellow card) 61' (yellow-red card); Pukki 65'; Holst (yellow card) 72'	Report	Donyoh 49'; Marcondes 56'; Asante 76'; Maxsø (yellow card) 79'; Lobotka (yellow card) 89'	Stadium: Brøndby Stadium; Attendance: 12,510; Referee: (Denmark) Michael Tykgaard

12 March 2017 25	AC Horsens	0–2	Brøndby IF	Horsens
16:00	Kryger (yellow card) 69'	Report	Mukhtar (yellow card) 13'; Austin 16' (yellow card) 61'; Nørgaard 19'; Wilczek (yellow card) 34'	Stadium: CASA Arena Horsens; Attendance: 4,977; Referee: (Denmark) Anders Poulsen (referee)

19 March 2017 26	Brøndby IF	3–2	Lyngby	Brøndby
17:00	Austin (yellow card) 25'; Phiri (yellow card) 40'; Wilczek 59' 74' 78'	Report	Kjær 16'; Odgaard 82'	Stadium: Brøndby Stadium; Attendance: 15,118; Referee: (Denmark) Mads Kristoffersen

2 April 2017 27	Brøndby IF	3–2	FC Midtjylland	Brøndby
18:00	Phiri 36'; Larsson 52'; Sikošek (yellow card) 60'; Nørgaard 63'	Report	Onuachu 39' 65'; Bruninho (yellow card) 90+7'	Stadium: Brøndby Stadium; Attendance: 12,113; Referee: (Denmark) Anders Poulsen (referee)

9 April 2017 28	Lyngby	1–2	Brøndby IF	Kongens Lyngby
16:00	Odgaard (yellow card) 53'; Lumb (yellow card) 61'; Christjansen 81'; Brandrup (yellow card) 83'	Report	Pukki 29' 64'; Arajuuri (yellow card) 30'; Kliment (yellow card) 90+4'	Stadium: Lyngby Stadion; Attendance: 5,657; Referee: (Denmark) Sandi Putros

17 April 2017 29	Brøndby IF	0–1	FC København	Brøndby
16:00	Röcker (yellow card) 79'; Pukki (yellow card) 81'	Report	Verbič 65'; Toutouh (yellow card) 81'	Stadium: Brøndby Stadium; Attendance: 23,405; Referee: (Denmark) Michael Tykgaard

23 April 2017 30	Nordsjælland	0–1	Brøndby IF	Farum
16:00	Jensen (yellow card) 61'; Mtiliga (yellow card) 66'; Maxsø (yellow card) 72'; Marcondes (yellow card) 89'; Pedersen (yellow card) 90+5'	Report	Nørgaard (yellow card) 25'; Pukki (yellow card) 57'; Larsson 79'; Sikošek (yellow card) 90+1'	Stadium: Farum Park; Attendance: 6,238; Referee: (Denmark) Jakob Kehlet

30 April 2017 31	Brøndby IF	1–1	SønderjyskE	Brøndby
18:00	Rønnow (yellow card) 4'; Mukhtar (yellow card) 37'; Arajuuri (yellow card) 40'; Austin (yellow card) 41'; Röcker (yellow card) 42'; Nilsson 73'	Report	Absalonsen 4' (pen.) (yellow card) 75'; Madsen (yellow card) 34'; Luyckx (yellow card) 37'; Poulsen (yellow card) 41'; Kløve (yellow card) 83'	Stadium: Brøndby Stadium; Attendance: 11,626; Referee: (Denmark) Michael Johansen

7 May 2017 32	Midtjylland	4–2	Brøndby IF	Herning
18:00	Novák (yellow card) 34'; Onuachu 36'; Hassan 55'; Duelund 60' 65' (yellow card) 67'; Halsti (yellow card) 82'; Bruninho (yellow card) 89'	Report	Holst (yellow card) 63'; Mensah 72'; Pukki 88'	Stadium: MCH Arena; Attendance: 7,327; Referee: (Denmark) Michael Tykgaard

14 May 2017 33	FC København	1–0	Brøndby IF	Copenhagen
18:00	Kusk 13'; Kvist (yellow card) 52'; Verbič (yellow card) 75'; Johansson (yellow card) 79'; Greguš (yellow card) 87'	Report	Mukhtar (yellow card) 41'; Austin (yellow card) 43'; Hermannsson (yellow card) 76'; Wilczek (yellow card) 79'	Stadium: Telia Parken; Attendance: 24,842; Referee: (Denmark) Mads Kristoffersen

18 May 2017 34	Brøndby IF	0–2	Lyngby	Brøndby
20:00	Sikošek (red card) 4'; Rønnow (yellow card) 25'; Arajuuri (yellow card) 65'; Mukhtar (yellow card) 79'	Report	Ørnskov 25' (yellow card) 60'; Christensen (yellow card) 27'; Larsen 74'; Kjærgaard (yellow card) 87'	Stadium: Brøndby Stadium; Attendance: 6,533; Referee: (Denmark) Morten Krogh

21 May 2017 35	SønderjyskE	3–0	Brøndby IF	Haderslev
18:00	Madsen (yellow card) 52'; Jakobsen 60' 89' 90+3'	Report	Crone (yellow card) 5'; Arajuuri (yellow card) 44'; Röcker (yellow card) 77'	Stadium: Sydbank Park; Attendance: 5,712; Referee: (Denmark) Jorgen Burchardt

28 May 2017 36	Brøndby IF	1–2	Nordsjælland	Brøndby
16:00	Pukki 9'; Hermannsson (red card) 11'; Larsson (yellow card) 33'	Report	Lobotka (yellow card) 16'; Skovgaard (yellow card) 24'; Bartolec (yellow card) 49'; Ingvartsen 55'; Rasmussen 57'	Stadium: Brøndby Stadium; Attendance: 12,322; Referee: (Denmark) Lars Christoffersen

=== Danish Cup ===
Win Draw Loss

26 October 2016 Third round	BK Frem	1- 2	Brøndby IF	Valby
20:15 CEST		Summary		Stadium: Valby Idrætspark

8 March 2017 Last 16	BK Marienlyst	1–4	Brøndby IF	Brøndby
17:45	Esben Petersen 37' (pen.); Anders Kolind (yellow card) 45'; Alexander Hemmingsen (yellow card) 90+1'	Report	Austin 20'; Crone 24'; Wilczek 32'; Kalmár 34'	Stadium: Brøndby Stadium; Attendance: 3,102; Referee: (Denmark) Lars Christoffersen

13 April 2017 Quarter Final	Randers	2–4 (a.e.t.)	Brøndby IF	Randers
18:30	Bruhn 15' (yellow card) 31'; Pourié 39'; Thomsen (yellow card) 90+1'	Report	Wilczek 5'; Röcker (yellow card) 74'; Mukhtar 90' 93'; Kalmár 97'	Stadium: BioNutria Park Randers; Attendance: 5,438; Referee: (Denmark) Jørgen Daugbjerg Burchardt

4 May 2017 Semi Final	FC Midtjylland	1–2	Brøndby IF	Herning
18:30	Poulsen 29' (pen.); Borring (yellow card) 31'; Halsti (yellow card) 54'; Novák (yellow card) 80'	Report	Austin (yellow card) 29'; Pukki 34'; Nørgaard 90'; Phiri (red card) 90'	Stadium: MCH Arena; Referee: (Denmark) Mads Kristoffersen

25 May 2017 Final	Brøndby IF	1–3	FC København	Copenhagen
17:00	Crone (yellow card) 53'; Pukki 61'; Nørgaard (yellow card) 71'; Wilczek (yellow card) 81'	Report	Cornelius 51' (yellow card) 53' (goal) 85'; Augustinsson (yellow card) 64'; Kvist (yellow card) 81'; Santander 83' (yellow card) 83'	Stadium: Telia Parken; Attendance: 32,140; Referee: (Denmark) Jens Maae

=== UEFA Europa League ===
==== First qualifying round ====
Win Draw Loss

30 June 2016 First leg	Valur (Iceland)	1–4	(Denmark) Brøndby IF	Reykjavík, Iceland
23:00 CEST	Ingvarsson 90+2'		Wilczek (yellow card) 33', (goal) 47', 54'; Pukki 61'; Greko 79'	Stadium: Hlíðarendi (stadium); Attendance: 728; Referee: Ali Palabiyik (Turkey)

7 July 2016 Second leg	Brøndby IF (Denmark)	6–0 (10–1 agg.)	(Iceland) Valur	Brøndby, Denmark
18:30 CEST	Wilczek 5'; Hjulsager 15'; Nørgaard (yellow card) 17'; Pukki 26', 57'; Stückler 71', 90+3'		Sigurðsson (yellow card) 85'	Stadium: Brøndby Stadium; Attendance: 6,227; Referee: Tihomir Pejin (Croatia)

==== Second qualifying round ====
14 July 2016 First leg	Hibernian (Scotland)	0–1	(Denmark) Brøndby IF	Edinburgh, Scotland
20:45 CEST	Cummings (yellow card) 67'; Fontaine (yellow card) 80'		Wilczek 1', (yellow card) 49'; Austin (yellow card) 33' da Silva (yellow card) 65'	Stadium: Easter Road; Attendance: 13,454; Referee: Juan Martínez Munuera (Spain)

21 July 2016 Second leg	Brøndby IF (Denmark)	0–1 (a.e.t.) (1–1 agg.) (5–3 p)	(Scotland) Hibernian	Brøndby, Denmark
20:00 CEST	Nørgaard (yellow card) 74'; Larsson (yellow card) 96'		Gray 62'; McGregor (yellow card) 87'	Stadium: Brøndby Stadium; Attendance: 11,548; Referee: Marius Avram (Romania)
	Penalties
	Larsson (penalty scored); Nørgaard (penalty scored); Stückler (penalty scored); Wilczek (penalty scored); Holst (penalty scored)		McGinn (penalty missed); Hanlon (penalty scored); Holt (penalty scored); Boyle (penalty scored)

==== Third qualifying round ====
28 July 2016 First leg	Hertha Berlin (Germany)	1–0	(Denmark) Brøndby IF	Berlin, Germany
20:15 CEST	Ibišević 28'		Larsson (yellow card) 23'; Austin (yellow card) 85'	Stadium: Friedrich-Ludwig-Jahn-Sportpark; Attendance: 18,454; Referee: Kevin Blom (Netherlands)

4 August 2016 Second leg	Brøndby IF (Denmark)	3–1 (3–2 agg.)	(Germany) Hertha Berlin	Brøndby, Denmark
20:15 CEST	Pukki 3', 34', 52'		Plattenhardt (yellow card) 24'; Ibišević 30'; Langkamp (yellow card) 66'; Darida (yellow card) 86'; Brooks (yellow card) 90+3'	Stadium: Brøndby Stadium; Attendance: 17,102; Referee: Paweł Gil (Poland)

==== Play-off round ====
18 August 2016 First leg	Panathinaikos (Greece)	3–0	(Denmark) Brøndby IF	Athens, Greece
20:00 CEST	Koutroumpis (yellow card) 4'; Wakaso (yellow card) 31'; Berg 45+2', 82'; Ledesma 54' (pen.)		Crone (yellow card) 9' (yellow-red card) 33'; Albrechtsen (yellow card) 36'; Rønnow (red card) 50'	Stadium: Leoforos Alexandras Stadium; Attendance: 11,072; Referee: István Vad (Hungary)

25 August 2016 Second leg	Brøndby IF (Denmark)	1–1 (1–4 agg.)	(Greece) Panathinaikos	Brøndby, Denmark
19:00 CEST	Mukhtar 35'; Hjulsager (yellow card) 45+1'		Wakaso (yellow card) 40'; Koutroumpis (yellow card) 49'; Ivanov 66'	Stadium: Brøndby Stadium; Attendance: 13,521; Referee: Oliver Drachta (Austria)

==== Results summary ====
Overall							Home						Away					
Pld	W	D	L	GF	GA	GD	W	D	L	GF	GA	GD	W	D	L	GF	GA	GD
8	4	1	3	15	8	+7	2	0	1	9	2	+7	2	1	2	6	6	0

Last updated: 26 August 2016.

Source: UEFA Europa League

== Statistics ==
=== Appearances ===
No.	Pos.	Player	Total					Alka Superliga					Danish Cup					Europa League				
No.	Pos.	Player				Yellow card	Red card				Yellow card	Red card				Yellow card	Red card				Yellow card	Red card
1	GK	(Denmark) Frederik Rønnow	16	0	0	0	1	9	0	0	0	0	0	0	0	0	0	7	0	0	0	1
2	DF	(South Korea) Yun Suk-young	0	0	0	0	0	0	0	0	0	0	0	0	0	0	0	0	0	0	0	0
4	DF	(Germany) Benedikt Röcker	17	0	0	1	0	9	0	0	1	0	0	0	0	0	0	8	0	0	0	0
5	DF	(Denmark) Martin Albrechtsen	0	0	0	0	0	0	0	0	0	0	0	0	0	0	0	0	0	0	0	0
6	DF	(Iceland) Hjörtur Hermannsson	0	0	0	0	0	7	0	1	2	0	0	0	0	0	0	0	0	0	0	0
7	MF	(Denmark) Thomas Kahlenberg	0	0	0	0	0	0	0	0	0	0	0	0	0	0	0	0	0	0	0	0
8	MF	(Jamaica) Rodolph Austin	0	0	0	0	0	1	4	0	0	0	0	0	0	0	0	0	0	0	0	0
9	FW	(Finland) Teemu Pukki	0	0	0	0	0	8	0	8	0	0	0	0	0	0	0	0	0	0	0	0
10	MF	(Germany) Hany Mukthar	0	0	0	0	0	5	1	1	0	0	0	0	0	0	0	0	0	0	0	0
12	MF	(Denmark) Frederik Holst	0	0	0	0	0	5	3	2	1	0	0	0	0	0	0	0	0	0	0	0
13	DF	(Sweden) Johan Larsson	0	0	0	0	0	4	1	0	0	0	0	0	0	0	0	0	0	0	0	0
15	FW	(Costa Rica) Marco Ureña	0	0	0	0	0	1	5	0	0	0	0	0	0	0	0	0	0	0	0	0
16	GK	(Denmark) Mads Toppel	0	0	0	0	0	0	0	0	0	0	0	0	0	0	0	0	0	0	0	0
17	DF	(Denmark) Rezan Corlu	0	0	0	0	0	0	0	0	0	0	0	0	0	0	0	0	0	0	0	0
18	MF	(South Africa) Lebogang Phiri	0	0	0	0	0	8	0	0	0	0	0	0	0	0	0	0	0	0	0	0
19	MF	(Denmark) Christian Nørgaard	0	0	0	0	0	8	1	0	3	0	0	0	0	0	0	0	0	0	0	0
20	FW	(Poland) Kamil Wilczek	0	0	0	0	0	7	1	6	1	0	0	0	0	0	0	0	0	0	0	0
21	MF	(Denmark) Andrew Hjulsager	0	0	0	0	0	8	0	6	2	0	0	0	0	0	0	0	0	0	0	0
22	FW	(Sweden) Gustaf Nilsson	0	0	0	0	0	0	0	0	0	0	0	0	0	0	0	0	0	0	0	0
23	DF	(Denmark) Patrick da Silva	0	0	0	0	0	1	0	0	0	0	0	0	0	0	0	0	0	0	0	0
24	FW	(Denmark) Daniel Stückler	0	0	0	0	0	1	0	0	0	0	0	0	0	0	0	0	0	0	0	0
25	FW	(Denmark) Christian Jakobsen	0	0	0	0	0	2	6	0	0	0	0	0	0	0	0	0	0	0	0	0
27	DF	(Denmark) Svenn Crone	0	0	0	0	0	7	2	0	2	0	0	0	0	0	0	0	0	0	0	0
29	FW	(Czech Republic) Jan Kliment	0	0	0	0	0	0	2	0	0	0	0	0	0	0	0	0	0	0	0	0
30	GK	(Denmark) Viktor Anker	0	0	0	0	0	0	0	0	0	0	0	0	0	0	0	0	0	0	0	0
35	FW	(Costa Rica) Jose Nuñez	0	0	0	0	0	0	0	0	0	0	0	0	0	0	0	0	0	0	0	0
Players who left the club in August/January transfer window or on loan
2	DF	(Denmark) Jesper Juelsgaard	0	0	0	0	0	2	0	0	1	0	0	0	0	0	0	0	0	0	0	0
11	MF	(Denmark) Jonas Borring	0	0	0	0	0	0	0	0	0	0	0	0	0	0	0	0	0	0	0	0
15	MF	(Denmark) David Boysen	0	0	0	0	0	0	0	0	0	0	0	0	0	0	0	0	0	0	0	0

Last updated: 18 September 2016.

Source: brondby.com

=== Top scorers ===
The list is sorted by shirt number when total goals are equal.

Rnk	Pos	No.	Player	Danish Superliga	Danish Cup	Europa League	Total
1	FW	9	(Finland) Teemu Pukki	9	0	6	15
2	FW	20	(Poland) Kamil Wilczek	7	0	4	11
3	MF	21	(Denmark) Andrew Hjulsager	6	0	1	7
4	MF	10	(Germany) Hany Mukthar	3	0	1	4
5	DF	12	(Denmark) Frederik Holst	2	0	0	2
5	FW	24	(Denmark) Daniel Stückler	0	0	2	2
7	DF	6	(Iceland) Hjörtur Hermannsson	1	0	0	1
7	MF	19	(Denmark) Christian Nørgaard	1	0	0	1
7	FW	25	(Denmark) Christian Jakobsen	0	0	1	1
Own goals				1	0	0	1
Total				30	0	15	45

Last updated: 2 October 2016.

Source: brondby.com
