= 2017–18 Brøndby IF season =

Brøndby
2017–18 season
- Sporting director: Troels Bech
- Head coach: Alexander Zorniger
- Ground: Brøndby Stadion
- Danish Superliga: 2nd
- Danish Cup: Winners
- UEFA Europa League: Third qualifying round
- Top goalscorer: League: Teemu Pukki (17); All: Teemu Pukki (19)
Home colours	Away colours	Third colours

The 2017–18 Brøndby IF season was Brøndby IF's 37th consecutive season in the top tier of Danish football, 28th consecutive in the Superligaen, and 52nd as a football club. Besides Superligaen, the club participated in DBU Pokalen and UEFA Europa League. It was the second season with manager Alexander Zorniger.

== Club ==
=== First team staff ===
Position	Staff
Head coach	(Germany) Alexander Zorniger
Assistant	(Germany) Matthias Jaissle
Assistant	(Denmark) Martin Retov
Physical trainer	(United States) Aaron Thode
Goalkeeping coach	(Denmark) Lars Høgh
Goalkeeping coach	(Denmark) Sten Christensen

Last updated: 6 June 2017

=== Administration ===
Position	Staff
Sporting director	(Denmark) Troels Bech
Team manager	(Denmark) Thomas Andersen
Kit manager	(Denmark) Leif Mortensen
Scout	(Denmark) John Møller

Last updated: 6 June 2017

== Players ==
=== First team ===
Updated until May 2018: Note: Flags indicate national team as defined under FIFA eligibility rules; some limited exceptions apply. Players may hold more than one non-FIFA nationality.

No.	Pos.	Nation	Player
1	GK	DEN	Frederik Rønnow (sold to Eintracht Frankfurt as of 1 July 2018)
3	DF	GER	Anthony Jung
4	DF	GER	Benedikt Röcker
6	DF	ISL	Hjörtur Hermannsson
8	MF	DEN	Kasper Fisker
9	FW	FIN	Teemu Pukki
10	MF	GER	Hany Mukhtar
12	MF	SWE	Simon Tibbling
13	DF	SWE	Johan Larsson (Captain)
14	MF	DEN	Kevin Mensah
16	GK	GER	Benjamin Bellot
17	FW	DEN	Andreas Bruus

No.	Pos.	Nation	Player
18	MF	KOS	Besar Halimi (on loan from Mainz 05)
19	MF	DEN	Christian Nørgaard
20	FW	POL	Kamil Wilczek
21	MF	DEN	Lasse Vigen Christensen
23	DF	FIN	Paulus Arajuuri
24	DF	DEN	Joel Kabongo
26	MF	SVK	Filip Blazek
27	DF	DEN	Svenn Crone
28	DF	DEN	Christan Enemark
29	FW	CZE	Jan Kliment
30	GK	DEN	Viktor Anker
40	GK	DEN	Casper Hauervig

=== Transfers ===
==== In ====
No.	Pos.	Player	Transfer from	Type	Date	Fee	Source
16	GK	Benjamin Bellot (GER)	RB Leipzig	Contract expiration	14 June 2017	Free transfer	
8	MF	Kasper Fisker (DNK)	Randers FC	Transfer	26 June 2017		
18	MF	Besar Halimi (KOS)	Mainz 05	Loan	26 June 2017		
26	MF	Filip Blazek (SVK)	FK Senica	Transfer	11 July 2017		

Last updated: 9 June 2017 Source: brondby.com

==== Out ====
No.	Pos.	Player	Transfer to	Type	Date	Fee	Source
30	GK	Viktor Anker (DNK)	Næstved	Loan	9 June 2017		
22	FW	Gustaf Nilsson (SWE)	Silkeborg IF	Loan	10 July 2017		

Last updated: 9 June 2017 Source: brondby.com

== Competitions ==
=== Superligaen ===
==== Main round ====
Pos	Team	Pld	W	D	L	GF	GA	GD	Pts	Qualification
1	Brøndby	26	18	6	2	58	24	+34	60	Qualification for the Championship round
2	Midtjylland	26	19	3	4	60	29	+31	60	Qualification for the Championship round
3	Nordsjælland	26	15	5	6	62	41	+21	50	Qualification for the Championship round
4	Copenhagen	26	13	5	8	50	33	+17	44	Qualification for the Championship round
5	Aalborg	26	8	12	6	28	27	+1	36	Qualification for the Championship round

Source: Danish Football Association (in Danish), Soccerway
Rules for classification: 1) Points; 2) Goal difference; 3) Goals scored; 4) Away goals scored; 5) Play-off (played on neutral ground if determining teams for different rounds); 6) Draw.

==== Results summary ====
Overall								Home						Away					
Pld	W	D	L	GF	GA	GD	Pts	W	D	L	GF	GA	GD	W	D	L	GF	GA	GD
20	14	4	2	45	19	+26	46	8	2	0	29	9	+20	6	2	2	16	10	+6

Last updated: 11 February 2018.

==== Results after each round ====
Round	1	2	3	4	5	6	7	8	9	10	11	12	13	14	15	16	17	18	19	20	21	22	23	24	25	26
Ground	H	A	H	H	A	H	H	A	H	A	H	H	A	H	A	H	A	A	H	A	A	H	A	H	A	H
Result	W	L	W	W	D	L	W	D	D	W	W	W	W	W	W	W	W	W	D	W	D	W	W	W	D	W

Updated to match(es) played on 5 May 2018. Source: 2017–18 Danish Superliga
A = Away; H = Home; W = Win; D = Draw; L = Loss

==== Matches ====
Brøndby IF's games in the main round 2017-18:

Win Draw Loss

16 July 2017 1st round	Brøndby IF	4–0	FC Midtjylland	Brøndby
18:00	Pukki 20'; Kliment 36'; Halimi 62'; Mensah 84'	Report	Drachmann (yellow card) 36'; Kroon (yellow card) 42'; Sørloth (yellow card) 90+2'	Stadium: Brøndby Stadion; Attendance: 10,288; Referee: (Denmark) Anders Poulsen (referee)

23 July 2017 2nd round	FC Nordsjælland	3–2	Brøndby IF	Farum
16:00	Donyoh 50' 52' da Silva (yellow card) 82'; Asante 86'	Report	Pukki 45'; Christensen 61'; Nørgaard (yellow card) 62'; Kliment (yellow card) 83'	Stadium: Right to Dream Park; Attendance: 5,115; Referee: (Denmark) Peter Kjærsgaard-Andersen

30 July 2017 3rd round	Brøndby IF	5–3	Lyngby BK	Brøndby
18:00	Kliment 5'; Christensen 55' 68' (yellow card) 81' (goal) 84'; Hermannsson (yellow card) 59'; Fisker (yellow card) 64'; Halimi 79'	Report	Blume 2'; Rygaard Jensen (yellow card) 26' (yellow-red card); Lund (yellow card) 28'; Ojo 43'; Højer (yellow card) 71' (goal) 74' (pen.)	Stadium: Brøndby Stadion; Attendance: 11,834; Referee: (Denmark) Jakob Kehlet

6 August 2017 4th round	Brøndby IF	1–0	F.C. København	Brøndby
18:00	Larsson (yellow card) 44'; Halimi (yellow card) 44'; Tibbling 90'	Report	Johansson (yellow card) 24'; Kvist (yellow card) 44'; Olsen (yellow card) 45'; Verbič (yellow card) 45+2'	Stadium: Brøndby Stadion; Attendance: 21,169; Referee: (Denmark) Anders Poulsen (referee)

13 August 2017 5th round	Randers FC	0–0	Brøndby IF	Randers
16:00	Marxen (yellow card) 42'; Enghardt (yellow card) 53'; Kauko (yellow card) 85'	Report	Wilczek (yellow card) 81'; Tibbling (yellow card) 90+2'	Stadium: BioNutria Park Randers; Attendance: 6,107; Referee: (Denmark) Morten Krogh

20 August 2017 6th round	AGF	2–0	Brøndby IF	Århus
18:00	Hermansson 12' (o.g.); Møller (yellow card) 35'; Pedersen (yellow card) 61'; Mikanović (yellow card) 85'; Amini (yellow card) 89'	Report	Röcker (red card) 25'; Crone (yellow card) 42'	Stadium: Ceres Park; Attendance: 12,156; Referee: (Denmark) Jens Maae

27 August 2017 7th round	Brøndby IF	2–0	AC Horsens	Brøndby
16:00	Crone (yellow card) 8'; Larsson 61'; Kliment 90+1'	Report	Bjarke Jacobsen (yellow card) 18'; Finnbogason (yellow card) 62'; Joronen (yellow card) 90'	Stadium: Brøndby Stadion; Attendance: 12,175; Referee: (Denmark) Jakob Kehlet

10 September 2017 8th round	OB	1–1	Brøndby IF	Odense
18:00	Uzochukwu 7' (red card) 10'; Petersen (yellow card) 59'	Report	Kliment 57' (yellow card) 90+1'	Stadium: EWII Park; Attendance: 10,717; Referee: (Denmark) Jakob Kehlet

17 September 2017 9th round	Brøndby IF	0–0	AaB	Brøndby
18:00	Arajuuri (yellow card) 15' (yellow-red card)	Report	Pohl (yellow card) 35'; Ahlmann (yellow card) 45'; Šafranko (yellow card) 55'; Lesniak (yellow card) 90+3'	Stadium: Brøndby Stadion; Attendance: 13,138; Referee: (Denmark) Michael Johansen

24 September 2017 10th round	Hobro IK	1–2	Brøndby IF	Hobro
18:00	Kirkevold 42' (pen.); Gotfredsen (yellow card) 48'; Vito Hammershøy-Mistrati (yellow card) 74'	Report	Röcker 65'; Wilczek 90'	Stadium: Hobro Stadion; Attendance: 4,546; Referee: (Denmark) Peter Kjærsgaard-Andersen

1 October 2017 11th round	Brøndby IF	4–0	SønderjyskE	Brøndby
16:00	Mukhtar 25' 85'; Tibbling (yellow card) 34'; Kliment (yellow card) 59'; Nørgaard (yellow card) 72'; Larsson 81'; Halimi 90'	Report	Jónsson (yellow card) 19'; Rømer (yellow card) 38'; Luijckx (yellow card) 52'	Stadium: Brøndby Stadion; Attendance: 13,078; Referee: (Denmark) Mads Kristoffersen

15 October 2017 12th round	Brøndby IF	4–1	Silkeborg IF	Brøndby
16:00	Halimi 53'; Mukhtar 56'; Wilczek 60'; Tibbling 66'; Röcker (yellow card) 89'	Report	Nilsson 8'; Skytte (yellow card) 14' (yellow-red card); Moro (yellow card) 58'	Stadium: Brøndby Stadion; Attendance: 13,778; Referee: (Denmark) Anders Poulsen (referee)

22 October 2017 13th round	FC Helsingør	0–1	Brøndby IF	Helsingør
16:00	Køhler (yellow card) 35'; Olsen (yellow card) 88'	Report	Pukki 4' (yellow card) 51'; Jung (yellow card) 53' (yellow-red card); Larsson (yellow card) 78'	Stadium: Helsingør Stadion; Attendance: 5,189; Referee: (Denmark) Jorgen Burchardt

30 October 2017 14th round	Brøndby IF	3–1	Randers FC	Brøndby
19:00	Kauko 15' (o.g.); Halimi 59' 90+4'	Report	Bager 30'; Rodić (yellow card) 47'; Kitchen (yellow card) 59'	Stadium: Brøndby Stadion; Attendance: 10,124; Referee: (Denmark) Jens Maae

5 November 2017 15th round	F.C. København	0–1	Brøndby IF	Østerbro
12:00	Bengtsson (yellow card) 41'; Falk (yellow card) 55'; Kvist (yellow card) 72'	Report	Tibbling (yellow card) 39'; Nørgaard 42' (yellow card) 53'; Mukhtar (yellow card) 57'; Fisker (yellow card) 71'	Stadium: Telia Parken; Attendance: 24,446; Referee: (Denmark) Mads Kristoffersen

19 November 2017 16th round	Brøndby IF	4–2	FC Nordsjælland	Brøndby
18:00	Pukki 12' 48' 61'; Kliment (yellow card) 69'; Mukhtar 73'; Rønnow (yellow card) 75'	Report	Pedersen (yellow card) 39'; Marcondes 76' (pen.); Rasmussen 81'	Stadium: Brøndby Stadion; Attendance: 13,243; Referee: (Denmark) Sandi Putros

26 November 2017 17th round	Silkeborg IF	1–3	Brøndby IF	Silkeborg
18:00	Skhirtladze 32'	Report	Jung (yellow card) 16'; Pukki 44'; Wilczek 47'; Arajuuri (yellow card) 72'; Mukhtar (yellow card) 85' (goal) 90+4'	Stadium: Jysk Park; Attendance: 5,777; Referee: (Denmark) Jorgen Burchardt

3 December 2017 18th round	SønderjyskE	1–3	Brøndby IF	Haderslev
16:00	Jakobsen 36'; Zimling (yellow card) 51'	Report	Arajuuri 12'; Röcker (yellow card) 14'; Mukhtar 64'; Kliment 72'	Stadium: Sydbank Park; Attendance: 7,150; Referee: (Denmark) Mads Kristoffersen

10 December 2017 19th round	Brøndby IF	2–2	AGF	Brøndby
18:00	Tibbling 13'; Halimi 51'; Fisker (yellow card) 90+2'	Report	Møller 63'; Sana 76' (pen.); Backman (yellow card) 90+2'	Stadium: Brøndby Stadion; Attendance: 16,235; Referee: (Denmark) Peter Kjærsgaard-Andersen

11 February 2018 20th round	Lyngby BK	1–3	Brøndby IF	Kongens Lyngby
11:00	Christjansen (yellow card) 66'; Fosgaard (yellow card) 74'; Arajuuri (OG) 87'	Report	Tshiembe (OG) 23'; Wilczek 28'; Pukki 54'; Larsson (yellow card) 63'; Mukhtar (yellow card) 73'	Stadium: Lyngby Stadion; Attendance: 3,342; Referee: (Denmark) Peter Munch Larsen

18 February 2018 21st round	AaB	1–1	Brøndby IF	Aalborg
11:00	Blåbjerg (yellow card) 40'; Okore 62'; Pallesen (yellow card) 78'	Report	Hermannsson (red card) 30'; Fisker (yellow card) 23'; Mukhtar (yellow card) 44'; Röcker 50'; Pukki (yellow card) 80'	Stadium: Aalborg Portland Park; Attendance: 6,711; Referee: (Denmark) Sandi Putros

25 February 2018 22nd round	Brøndby IF	6–1	FC Helsingør	Brøndby
09:00	Arajuuri 7'; Mukhtar 10'; Wilczek 24'; Arajuuri (yellow card) 30'; Pukki 50', 54'; Christensen 75'; Frendup (yellow card) 90+1'	Report	Mortensen (yellow card) 58'; Tontini 69'; Jorgensen (yellow card) 89'	Stadium: Brøndby Stadion; Attendance: 11,547; Referee: (Denmark) Michael Johansen

1 March 2018 23rd round	FC Midtjylland	0–1	Brøndby IF	Herning
13:00	Hansen (yellow card) 36'	Report	Fisker 21' Rønnow (yellow card) 90+7'	Stadium: MCH Arena; Attendance: 10,862; Referee: Michael Tykgaard

4 March 2018 24th round	Brøndby IF	2–1	OB	Brøndby
11:00	Mukhtar 40'; Pukki 76'	Report	Rømer (yellow card) 57'; Nielsen (yellow card) 75'; Greve 86'	Stadium: Brøndby Stadion; Attendance: 10,030; Referee: Jens Maae

11 March 2018 25th round	AC Horsens	1–1	Brøndby IF	Horsens
12:00	Hansson (yellow card) 10'; Jacobsen (yellow card) 16'; Okosun 47'; Kortegaard (yellow card) 48'; Ludwig (yellow card) 65'; Borring (yellow card) 69'	Report	Wilczek 38'; Nørgaard (yellow card) 68'	Stadium: CASA Arena; Attendance: 4,363; Referee: Jakob Kehlet

18 March 2018 26th round	Brøndby IF	2–1	Hobro IK	Brøndby
11:00	Mukhtar 74'; Röcker (yellow card) 79'; Kliment 87' (yellow card) 90+2'	Report	Babayan (yellow card) 65' (goal) 77'; Damborg (yellow card) 70'	Stadium: Brøndby Stadion; Attendance: 13,467; Referee: Jørgen Daugbjerg Burchardt

=== DBU Pokalen ===
Win Draw Loss

20 September 2017 Third round	Ledøje-Smørum	1–5	Brøndby IF	Brøndby
20:30		Summary		Stadium: Brøndby Stadium

4 February 2018 Fourth round	København	0–1	Brøndby IF	Copenhagen
12:30				Stadium: Parken Stadium

4 April 2018 Quarter-finals	SønderjyskE	0 – 1 (a.e.t.)	Brøndby IF	Haderslev
12:30				Stadium: Sydbank Park

26 April 2018 Semi-finals	Brøndby IF	3–1	FC Midtjylland	Brøndby
18:30				Stadium: Brøndby Stadium

10 May 2018 Final	Brøndby IF	3–1	Silkeborg IF	Copenhagen
				Stadium: Parken Stadium

=== UEFA Europa League ===
Win Draw Loss

13. July 2017 2nd Qualifying First Leg	(Denmark) Brøndby IF	2–0	(Finland) VPS	Brøndby
20:00	Pukki 17'; Fisker 29'	Report	Sohna (yellow card) 77'	Stadium: Brøndby Stadion; Attendance: 8,533; Referee: (Belgium) Bart Vertenten

20 July 2017 2nd Qualifying Second Leg	VPS (Finland)	2–1 (2–3 agg.)	(Denmark) Brøndby IF	Vaasa, Finland
18:00	Voutilainen 11'; Sohna 40' (yellow card) 62'	Report	Meerits 16' (o.g.); Kliment (red card) 51'	Stadium: Hietalahti Stadion; Attendance: 4,385; Referee: (Italy) Paolo Valeri

27 July 2017 3rd Qualifying First Leg	(Denmark) Brøndby IF	0–0	(Croatia) Hajduk Split	Brøndby
20:00	Arajuuri (yellow card) 5' (yellow-red card); Fisker (yellow card) 80'	Report	Futács (yellow card) 34'; Erceg (yellow card) 59'	Stadium: Brøndby Stadion; Attendance: 12,535; Referee: (Scotland) Kevin Clancy

3 August 2017 3rd Qualifying Second Leg	(Croatia) Hajduk Split	2–0 (2–0 agg.)	(Denmark) Brøndby IF	Split
20:30	Erceg 59' 63'; Futács (yellow card) 65'; Edin Šehić (yellow card) 87'	Report	Crone (yellow card) 61'; Hermannsson (yellow card) 79'; Rønnow (yellow card) 86'; Mukhtar (yellow card) 87'	Stadium: Stadion Poljud; Attendance: 30,204; Referee: (Israel) Orel Grinfeeld

=== Pre-season friendlies ===
Win Draw Loss

June 18, 2017	Glostrup FK	1–4	Brøndby IF	Glostrup
13:30	62'	Report	24' Corlu; 74', 75' Bruus; 88' Tekşen	Stadium: Glostrup Idrætspark

June 23, 2017	Taastrup FC	1–3	Brøndby IF	Taastrup
18:30	89' Motlagh	Report	23' Nilsson; 35' Kliment; 70' Bruus	Stadium: Taastrup Idrætspark

June 28, 2017	Næstved BK	0–2	Brøndby IF	Næstved
17:30	Christiansen 82'	Report	34' Kliment; 42' Pukki	Stadium: Næstved Stadion

July 2, 2017	Qarabag FK (Azerbaijan)	1–5	Brøndby IF	Stainach, Austria
19:00	59' Ndlovu	Report	9' (pen.), 38' Kliment; 18' Wilczek; 65' Kalmar; 73' Bruus	Stadium: Stadion Stainach

July 8, 2017	FC Rostov (Russia)	1–0	Brøndby IF	Stainach, Austria
18:00	Bukharov 57'			Stadium: Stadion Stainach
