= 2014–15 Brøndby IF season =

Brøndby
2014–15 season
- Chairman: Jan Bech Andersen
- Head coach: Thomas Frank
- Stadium: Brøndby Stadium
- Danish Superliga: 3rd
- Danish Cup: Quarter-finals
- UEFA Europa League: Third qualifying round
- Top goalscorer: League: Teemu Pukki (9); All: Teemu Pukki (11)
Home colours	Away colours

The 2014–15 season was Brøndby's 34th consecutive season in the top flight of Danish football, 25th consecutive season in the Danish Superliga, and 49th year in existence as a football club. Brøndby participated in the Europa League this season, after coming in 4th place in the 2013–14 Danish Superliga.

== Squad ==
As 2 September 2014.

Note: Flags indicate national team as defined under FIFA eligibility rules; some limited exceptions apply. Players may hold more than one non-FIFA nationality.

No.	Pos.	Nation	Player
1	GK	FIN	Lukáš Hrádecký
2	DF	SWE	Michael Almebäck
3	DF	NOR	Fredrik Semb Berge
5	DF	DEN	Martin Albrechtsen (vice-captain)
6	MF	DEN	Martin Ørnskov
7	MF	DEN	Thomas Kahlenberg (captain)
8	MF	ARG	Alexander Szymanowski
9	FW	FIN	Teemu Pukki
10	FW	PAR	José Ariel Núñez
11	FW	SWE	Johan Elmander
12	DF	DEN	Frederik Holst
14	FW	KOS	Elbasan Rashani
15	MF	DEN	Mikkel Thygesen
16	GK	DEN	Michael Falkesgaard

No.	Pos.	Nation	Player
17	DF	DEN	Riza Durmisi
18	MF	RSA	Lebogang Phiri
19	MF	DEN	Christian Nørgaard
20	DF	DEN	Dario Dumić
21	MF	DEN	Andrew Hjulsager
22	DF	DEN	Daniel Agger
23	DF	DEN	Patrick da Silva
24	MF	MKD	Ferhan Hasani
25	MF	ISL	Hólmbert Friðjónsson
26	DF	DEN	Mads Nielsen
27	DF	DEN	Svenn Crone
28	MF	DEN	Daniel Holm
29	FW	DEN	Nikolai Laursen
30	GK	DEN	Andreas Hansen

=== Out on loan ===
Note: Flags indicate national team as defined under FIFA eligibility rules; some limited exceptions apply. Players may hold more than one non-FIFA nationality.

No.	Pos.	Nation	Player
—	MF	DEN	Kristian Andersen (at HB Køge until 30 June 2015 – end of contract)

== Competitions ==
=== Overview ===
Competition	Record							
Competition	G	W	D	L	GF	GA	GD	Win %
Superliga	14	6	3	5	19	15	+4	42.86
Danish Cup	1	1	0	0	3	1	+2	100.00
Europa League	2	0	0	2	0	5	−5	0.00
Total	17	7	3	7	22	21	+1	41.18

=== Overall ===
Competition	Started round	Current position / round	Final position / round	First match	Last match
Danish Superliga	—	5th		20 July	
Danish Cup	Third round	Fourth round		29 October	
UEFA Champions League	Third qualifying round	—	Third qualifying round	31 July	7 August

Updated to match played 10 November
Source: Competitions

=== Danish Superliga ===
==== League table ====
Pos	Team	Pld	W	D	L	GF	GA	GD	Pts	Qualification or relegation
1	Midtjylland (C)	33	22	5	6	64	34	+30	71	Qualification for Champions League second qualifying round
2	Copenhagen	33	20	7	6	40	22	+18	67	Qualification for Europa League second qualifying round (Note: Copenhagen qualified for Europa League second qualifying round by winning the 2014–15 Danish Cup. Therefore the spots awarded to the runners-up and third-placed teams are passed down to the third-placed team and fourth-placed team respectively.)
3	Brøndby	33	16	7	10	43	29	+14	55	Qualification for Europa League first qualifying round
4	Randers	33	14	10	9	39	28	+11	52	Qualification for Europa League first qualifying round
5	AaB	33	13	9	11	39	31	+8	48	

Source: Danish Superliga
Rules for classification: 1) points; 2) goal difference; 3) number of goals scored
(C) Champions

==== Results summary ====
Overall								Home						Away					
Pld	W	D	L	GF	GA	GD	Pts	W	D	L	GF	GA	GD	W	D	L	GF	GA	GD
14	6	3	5	19	15	+4	21	5	1	1	13	4	+9	1	2	4	6	11	−5

Last updated: 9 November 2014.
Source: Competitive matches

==== Results by round ====
Round	1	2	3	4	5	6	7	8	9	10	11	12	13	14	15	16	17	18	19	20	21	22	23	24	25	26	27	28	29	30	31	32	33
Ground	A	H	A	H	H	A	H	A	A	H	H	A	H	A	H	A																	
Result	L	W	L	D	W	W	L	L	D	W	W	D	W	L																			
Position	12	6	9	9	6	3	6	7	7	6	5	5	3	5																			

Updated to match(es) played on 9 November 2014. Source: Competitive matches
A = Away; H = Home; W = Win; D = Draw; L = Loss

==== Matches ====
===== July =====
20 July 2014 1	Midtjylland	3–1	Brøndby	Herning
20:00 CEST	Hassan 39'; Rasmussen 64'; Onuachu 86'	Report	Makienok 68'	Stadium: MCH Arena; Attendance: 9,548; Referee: Michael Tykgaard

28 July 2014 2	Brøndby	2–0	Silkeborg	Brøndby
20:00 CEST	Núñez 48'; Phiri 90+2'	Report		Stadium: Brøndby Stadium; Attendance: 15,986; Referee: Anders Poulsen

===== August =====
3 August 2014 3	Hobro	2–0	Brøndby	Hobro
20:00 CEST	Thomas Hansen 14' (pen.); Hvilsom 75'	Report		Stadium: DS Arena; Attendance: 6,593; Referee: Jakob Kehlet

10 August 2014 4	Brøndby	1–1	OB	Brøndby
20:00 CEST	Rashani 8'	Report	Høegh 90+1'	Stadium: Brøndby Stadium; Attendance: 11,116; Referee: Michael Johansen

17 August 2014 5	Brøndby	2–0	SønderjyskE	Brøndby
17:00 CEST	Makienok 49', 71'	Report		Stadium: Brøndby Stadium; Attendance: 9,962; Referee: Jens Maae

31 August 2014 6	Nordsjælland	0–3	Brøndby	Farum
17:00 CEST		Report	Elmander 56'; Berge 65'; Kahlenberg 81'	Stadium: Farum Park; Attendance: 7,689; Referee: Lars Christoffersen

===== September =====
14 September 2014 7	Brøndby	0–2	Randers	Brøndby
17:00 CEST		Report	Bjarnason 4'; Fall 82'	Stadium: Brøndby Stadium; Attendance: 25,551; Referee: Michael Tykgaard

21 September 2014 8	Copenhagen	1–0	Brøndby	Copenhagen
16:30 CEST	Kadrii 50' (yellow card) 51'; Delaney (yellow card) 71'	Report	Thygesen (yellow card) 17'; Kahlenberg (yellow card) 90'	Stadium: Parken; Attendance: 32,526; Referee: Kenn Hansen

28 September 2014 9	Esbjerg	2–2	Brøndby	Esbjerg
19:00 CEST	Andreasen 48'; Lekven 49'	Report	Kahlenberg (yellow card) 25'; Ørnskov (yellow card) 29'; Pukki 46'; Friðjónsson 79'	Stadium: Blue Water Arena; Attendance: 10,650; Referee: Jens Maae

===== October =====
5 October 2014 10	Brøndby	2–1	AaB	Brøndby
19:00 CEST	Pukki 44', 69'	Report	Frederiksen 74'	Stadium: Brøndby Stadium; Attendance: 15,412; Referee: Anders Poulsen

19 October 2014 11	Brøndby	5–0	FC Vestsjælland	Brøndby
17:00 CEST	Kahlenberg 15'; Pukki 62'; Hjulsager 62'; Durmisi 81'; Rashani 88'	Report		Stadium: Brøndby Stadium; Attendance: 12,190; Referee: Jakob Kehlet

26 October 2014 12	Esbjerg	0–0	Brøndby	Esbjerg
20:00 CET		Report		Stadium: Blue Water Arena; Attendance: 10,077; Referee: Kristoffer Kristoffersen

===== November =====
2 November 2014 13	Brøndby	1–0	Randers	Brøndby
18:30 CET	Pukki (yellow card) 52' (goal) 87'	Report	Agesen (yellow card) 36'	Stadium: Brøndby Stadium; Attendance: 12,497; Referee: Peter Rasmussen

9 November 2014 14	Hobro	3–0	Brøndby	Hobro
17:00 CET	Berggreen 53', 57'; Hvilsom 86'	Report		Stadium: DS Arena; Attendance: 4,389; Referee: Jakob Kehlet

23 November 2014 15	Brøndby	1–0	SønderjyskE	Brøndby
17:00 CET	Hjulsager 65'; Kahlenberg (yellow card) 69'; Durmisi (yellow card) 79'; Agger (yellow card) 90+1'	Report	Marxen (yellow card) 48'; Absalonsen (yellow card) 70'; Hansen (yellow card) 80'; Lodberg (yellow card) 89'; Paulsen (yellow card) 90+3'	Stadium: Brøndby Stadium; Attendance: 12,647; Referee: (Denmark) Kenn Hansen

30 November 2014 16	Nordsjælland	2–0	Brøndby	Farum
17:00 CET	John 6'; Lorentzen 51'; Mtiliga (yellow card) 62'	Report	Dumić (yellow card) 12' (yellow-red card)	Stadium: Farum Park; Attendance: 5,168; Referee: (Denmark) Michael Johansen

===== December =====
7 December 2014 17	Brøndby	1–0	Silkeborg IF	Brøndby
17:00 CET	Hasani 75' (yellow card) 77'; Elmander (yellow card) 87'	Summary	Putros (yellow card) 82'; Jens Martin Gammelby (red card) 87'	Stadium: Brøndby Stadium; Attendance: 19,304; Referee: (Denmark) Peter Kjærsgaard-Andersen

===== February =====
22 February 2015 18	AaB	1–0	Brøndby	Aalborg
19:00 CET	Thelander (yellow card) 15'; Würtz (yellow card) 29'; Helenius (yellow card) 87'; Jacobsen 90+2'	Summary	Hasani (yellow card) 28'	Stadium: Nordjyske Arena; Attendance: 7,857; Referee: (Denmark) Jens Maae

===== March =====
1 March 2015 19	Brøndby	1–1	FC Midtjylland	Brøndby
19:00 CET	Phiri (yellow card) 32'; Kahlenberg (yellow card) 54'; Elmander (red card) 58'; Agger (yellow card) 59'; Pukki (yellow card) 67'; Hasani 77'; Dumić (yellow card) 89'	Summary	Pušić 53'; Poulsen (yellow card) 59'; Sparv (yellow card) 75'	Stadium: Brøndby Stadium; Attendance: 13,290; Referee: (Denmark) Kenn Hansen

=== Danish Cup ===
29 October 2014 Third round	Fremad Amager	1–3	Brøndby	Copenhagen
20:30 CET	Krogdahl 88'	Report	Pukki 21'; Ørnskov 25' (pen.); Friðjónsson 73'	Stadium: Sundby Idrætspark

Fourth round	TBD	–	TBD
--:-- CET		[ Report]

=== UEFA Europa League ===
==== Third qualifying round ====
31 July 2014 First leg	Club Brugge (Belgium)	3–0	(Denmark) Brøndby	Jan Breydel Stadium, Bruges
20:30 CEST	Duarte 14'; Castillo 30'; Vázquez 63'	Report		Attendance: 24,217; Referee: Vladislav Bezborodov (Russia)

7 August 2014 Second leg	Brøndby (Denmark)	0–2	(Belgium) Club Brugge	Brøndby Stadium, Brøndby
20:00 CEST		Report	Castillo 38'; Fernando 45+1'	Attendance: 10,046; Referee: Alon Yefet (Israel)

== Statistics ==
=== Goalscorers ===
As of 9 November 2014

This includes all competitive matches. The list is sorted by shirt number when total goals are equal.

Rank	Pos	No.	Player	Superliga	Cup	Europa League	Total
1	FW	9	(Finland) Teemu Pukki	5	1	0	6
2	FW	9^	(Denmark) Simon Makienok	3	0	0	3
3	MF	7	(Denmark) Thomas Kahlenberg	2	0	0	2
3	FW	14	(Kosovo) Elbasan Rashani	2	0	0	2
3	MF	25	(Iceland) Hólmbert Friðjónsson	1	1	0	2
6	DF	3	(Norway) Fredrik Semb Berge	1	0	0	1
6	MF	6	(Denmark) Martin Ørnskov	0	1	0	1
6	FW	10	(Paraguay) José Ariel Núñez	1	0	0	1
6	FW	11	(Sweden) Johan Elmander	1	0	0	1
6	DF	17	(Denmark) Riza Durmisi	1	0	0	1
6	MF	18	(South Africa) Lebogang Phiri	1	0	0	1
6	MF	21	(Denmark) Andrew Hjulsager	1	0	0	1
#	Own goals			0	0	0	0
TOTALS				19	3	0	22

Note: ^ indicate player left out club during season.

=== Clean sheets ===
As of 9 November 2014

This includes all competitive matches. The list is sorted by shirt number when total clean sheets are equal.

Rnk	Pos	No.	Player	Superliga	Cup	Europa League	Total
1	GK	1	(Finland) Lukáš Hrádecký	6	0	0	6
TOTALS				6	0	0	6
