= 2015–16 Brøndby IF season =

Brøndby
2015–16 season
- Sports Director: Jan Bech Andersen
- Head Coach: Thomas Frank
- Ground: Brøndby Stadium
- Danish Superliga: 4th
- Danish Cup: Semi-finals
- UEFA Europa League: Play-off round
- Top goalscorer: League: Teemu Pukki (9); All: Teemu Pukki (13)
Home colours	Away colours

The 2015–16 season was Brøndby's 35th consecutive season in the top flight of Danish football, 26th consecutive season in the Danish Superliga, and 50th year in existence as a football club.

== Squad ==
As of 25 June 2015.

Note: Flags indicate national team as defined under FIFA eligibility rules; some limited exceptions apply. Players may hold more than one non-FIFA nationality.

No.	Pos.	Nation	Player
1	GK	DEN	Frederik Rønnow
5	DF	DEN	Martin Albrechtsen
6	MF	DEN	Martin Ørnskov
7	MF	DEN	Thomas Kahlenberg (captain)
9	FW	FIN	Teemu Pukki
10	FW	SWE	Magnus Eriksson
11	FW	SWE	Johan Elmander
12	DF	DEN	Frederik Holst
13	DF	SWE	Johan Larsson
14	FW	KOS	Elbasan Rashani
16	GK	DEN	Mads Toppel
17	DF	DEN	Riza Durmisi
18	MF	RSA	Lebogang Phiri

No.	Pos.	Nation	Player
19	MF	DEN	Christian Nørgaard
20	DF	DEN	Dario Dumić
21	MF	DEN	Andrew Hjulsager
22	DF	DEN	Daniel Agger (vice-captain)
23	DF	DEN	Patrick da Silva
25	MF	DEN	Christian Jakobsen
27	DF	DEN	Svenn Crone
28	DF	DEN	Malthe Johansen
29	DF	DEN	Kristian Larsen
30	GK	DEN	Andreas Hansen
32	MF	DEN	Rezan Corlu
34	FW	DEN	Daniel Stückler
64	FW	DEN	Ronnie Schwartz (on loan from Guingamp)

== Out on loan ==
Note: Flags indicate national team as defined under FIFA eligibility rules; some limited exceptions apply. Players may hold more than one non-FIFA nationality.

No.	Pos.	Nation	Player
—	DF	SWE	Michael Almebäck (at Esbjerg fB until 31 Dec 2015 - with buying option)
—	DF	NOR	Fredrik Semb Berge (at Molde FK until 31 Dec 2015)
—	FW	PAR	José Ariel Núñez (at Club Olimpia until 30 Jun 2016 - with buying option)

== Competitions ==
=== Danish Superliga ===
==== League table ====
Pos	Team	Pld	W	D	L	GF	GA	GD	Pts	Qualification or relegation
2	SønderjyskE	33	19	5	9	56	36	+20	62	Qualification for the Europa League second qualifying round
3	Midtjylland	33	17	8	8	57	33	+24	59	Qualification for the Europa League first qualifying round
4	Brøndby	33	16	6	11	43	37	+6	54	Qualification for the Europa League first qualifying round
5	AaB	33	15	5	13	56	44	+12	50	
6	Randers	33	13	8	12	45	43	+2	47	

Source: DBU, Soccerway
Rules for classification: 1) Points; 2) Goal difference; 3) Goals scored; 4) Head-to-head points; 5) Head-to-head goal difference; 6) Head-to-head goals scored; 7) Head-to-head away goals scored; 8) Play-off on neutral ground (only if rankings are important for medals, teams for relegation or teams for UEFA competitions); 9) Draw.
