= Kamil Wilczek =

Polish footballer (born 1988)

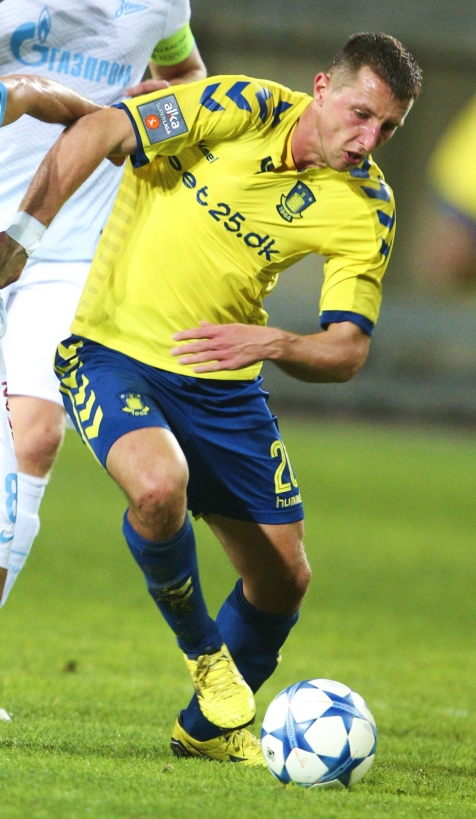
- Wilczek with Brøndby IF in 2016

Personal information
- Full name: Kamil Antoni Wilczek
- Date of birth: 14 January 1988 (age 38)
- Place of birth: Wodzisław Śląski, Poland
- Height: 1.86 m (6 ft 1 in)
- Position: Striker

Team information
- Current team: Železiarne Podbrezová (assistant)

Youth career
- WSP Wodzisław Śląski

Senior career*
Years	Team	Apps	(Gls)
2005–2006	Silesia Lubomia		
2006	Horadada		
2007	Elche Ilicitano		
2007–2008	GKS Jastrzębie	32	(5)
2009–2010	Piast Gliwice	39	(7)
2010–2013	Zagłębie Lubin	42	(2)
2013–2015	Piast Gliwice	66	(29)
2015–2016	Carpi	3	(0)
2016–2020	Brøndby	124	(71)
2020	Göztepe	14	(1)
2020–2022	Copenhagen	33	(11)
2022–2024	Piast Gliwice	53	(16)
Total		406+	(142+)

International career
2006–2007	Poland U19	4	(1)
2009–2010	Poland U21	8	(0)
2016–2017	Poland	3	(0)
- * Club domestic league appearances and goals

Kamil Antoni Wilczek (Polish pronunciation: [ˈkamil ˈvilt͡ʂɛk]; born 14 January 1988) is a Polish former professional footballer who played as a striker. He is currently the assistant manager of Slovak First Football League club Železiarne Podbrezová.

Wilczek began his senior career in Poland and had brief stints in Spain and Italy before gaining prominence at Brøndby in Denmark. He joined the club in January 2016 and became its captain in 2019, eventually becoming the all-time top scorer in the Danish Superliga for Brøndby with 71 goals. After a short spell in Turkey with Göztepe, he returned to Denmark in August 2020, signing a controversial deal with Brøndby's arch-rivals Copenhagen. He concluded his career with a third stint at Piast Gliwice, departing the club in 2024 due to injuries. Wilczek announced his retirement from professional football on 8 August 2024.

Internationally, Wilczek earned his first cap for the Poland national team in October 2016, having previously represented his country at under-19 and under-21 levels. He was named in the preliminary squad for the 2018 FIFA World Cup but did not make the final selection.

After retirement, he started his coaching career in January 2026 as an assistant at Slovak side Železiarne Podbrezová.

== Club career ==
=== Early career ===
Born in Wodzisław Śląski, Wilczek began his career with local club WSP Wodzisław Śląski, then moved on loan to LKS Silesia Lubomia. He also played for UD Horadada and Elche CF Ilicitano for short periods before moving on to GKS Jastrzębie in the Polish second tier from September 2007 to December 2008. He joined Piast Gliwice during the winter transfer window and made his Ekstraklasa debut in February 2009. In June 2010, he moved to Zagłębie Lubin, where he played for three years before returning to Piast Gliwice in 2013. In 2015, he became the top goalscorer of the Ekstraklasa with 20 goals.

Following the expiration of his contract with Gliwice in June 2015, Wilczek signed a three-year deal with Carpi. However, he failed to impress in Italy and only made three appearances for the club.

=== Brøndby ===
In January 2016, Wilczek signed a three-and-a-half-year contract with Danish club Brøndby IF. In April 2018, with Brøndby in the race for the Superliga title, Wilczek scored seven goals in five matches. His performances led to him being named as the Danish Superliga Player of the Month for April 2018. On 10 May 2018, he scored twice as Brøndby beat Silkeborg IF 3–1 in the 2017–18 Danish Cup final. At the end of the spring campaign Wilczek had scored 11 goals in 14 matches which earned him the Tipsbladet Player of the Spring Award.

Wilczek started the 2018–19 season where he left off, opening his goalscoring account in the 63rd minute of the season opener against Randers FC, which ended in a 2–0 away win. In the following weeks, Wilczek scored against Vejle Boldklub and FC Nordsjælland before scoring a brace against newly promoted Vendsyssel FF, helping Brøndby win the match 2–1. He continued his goalscoring form throughout the fall, becoming one of the most scoring players in Europe in 2018, only surpassed by the likes of Cristiano Ronaldo and Lionel Messi. In December 2018, Wilczek signed a two-year contract extension at Brøndby, which would keep him at the club until 2021. This deal came after a record year for the Polish striker: his 25 league goals of 2018 made him highest scoring player of a calendar year in Danish Superliga history.

After the departure of Benedikt Röcker, Wilczek was appointed as new permanent club captain, having temporarily replaced the former captain while he was benched during large parts of the spring campaign. He continued his goal form in the 2019–20 season, closing in on the club record for most goals in the Superliga held by Brøndby-legend, Ebbe Sand. Wilczek scored braces against OB, Hobro IK, as well as in the Copenhagen Derby against F.C. Copenhagen, securing a 3–1 win over the archrivals. On 1 December, Wilczek scored in a loss to F.C. Copenhagen at Telia Parken, his 70th Superliga goal for Brøndby, claiming the record for most goals scored in the Superliga for Brøndby from Sand.

=== Göztepe ===
On 22 January 2020, Turkish Süper Lig club Göztepe SK confirmed the signing of Wilczek on a one-and-a-half-year contract. He made his first appearance on 26 January, coming on as an 88th-minute substitute for Cameron Jerome as Göztepe defeated Beşiktaş 2–1. On 8 July, he scored his first goal for the club – a penalty shot – in a 2–2 draw against Ankaragücü. Wilczek made 14 league appearances for Göztepe, scoring one goal.

=== Copenhagen ===
On 6 August 2020, less than seven months after leaving Brøndby, Wilczek made a surprising and controversial move to Brøndby's bitter rivals Copenhagen. He signed a three-year contract with the club. Upon signing, he stated that he understood the disappointment of Brøndby's fans, but that he hoped they would also see the situation from his point of view. Wilczek had at that point already been labelled "Judas" by some Brøndby supporters, with angry fans of the team recording videos of themselves burning his jersey. On the evening after the move was announced, a large group of fans protested in front of Brøndby Stadium to show their discontent with Wilczek's transfer.

On 13 September, in the first match-day of the season, Wilczek scored a brace in a 3–2 loss to OB after being down 3–0 at half-time. He made his first European appearance for Copenhagen on 17 September in a 2–1 win over IFK Göteborg at Ullevi in the second qualifying round of the Europa League. A few days later, on 20 September, Wilczek scored the opener against former club and rivals Brøndby, as Copenhagen lost 2–1.

=== Third stint at Piast ===
On 31 January 2022, Wilczek terminated his contract with Copenhagen and joined Piast Gliwice on a two-and-a-half-year deal, making it the third time in his career he signed with the Silesian side.

On 17 May 2024, after his role within the roster was reduced due to injuries, Piast announced Wilczek would depart the club at the end of the season.

Wilczek announced his retirement from football on 8 August 2024, stating, "Football has given me a lot, but I believe I've reached a point where I can no longer continue. I don't want to force my career just to extend it."

== International career ==
Wilczek was a part of Poland u19 and Poland u21 teams.

He got his debut call-up in the Poland national team for the UEFA Euro 2016 qualifiers against Scotland and Republic of Ireland in October 2015. He debuted for Poland in a 2–1 2018 World Cup qualification win over Armenia 11 October 2016.

In May 2018 he was included in the Poland preliminary 35-man team for the 2018 World Cup in Russia. However, he did not make the final 23.

== Career statistics ==
=== Club ===
Appearances and goals by club, season and competition
Club	Season	League			National cup (Note: Includes Polish Cup, Coppa Italia, Danish Cup)		Europe		Play-offs		Total	
Club	Season	Division	Apps	Goals	Apps	Goals	Apps	Goals	Apps	Goals	Apps	Goals
GKS Jastrzębie	2007–08	I liga	22	3	0	0	—		—		22	3
GKS Jastrzębie	2008–09	I liga	10	2	1	0	—		—		11	2
GKS Jastrzębie	Total		32	5	1	0	—		—		33	5
Piast Gliwice	2008–09	Ekstraklasa	13	2	—		—		—		13	2
Piast Gliwice	2009–10	Ekstraklasa	26	5	1	0	—		—		27	5
Piast Gliwice	Total		39	7	1	0	—		—		40	7
Zagłębie Lubin	2010–11	Ekstraklasa	16	2	1	0	—		—		17	2
Zagłębie Lubin	2011–12	Ekstraklasa	16	0	0	0	—		—		16	0
Zagłębie Lubin	2012–13	Ekstraklasa	10	0	4	1	—		—		14	1
Zagłębie Lubin	Total		42	2	5	1	—		—		47	3
Piast Gliwice	2013–14	Ekstraklasa	31	9	1	0	1	0	—		33	9
Piast Gliwice	2014–15	Ekstraklasa	35	20	2	0	—		—		37	20
Piast Gliwice	Total		66	29	3	0	1	0	—		70	29
Carpi	2015–16	Serie A	3	0	1	0	—		—		4	0
Brøndby IF	2015–16	Danish Superliga	13	5	2	0	—		—		15	5
Brøndby IF	2016–17	Danish Superliga	30	13	4	2	8 (Note: Appearances in UEFA Europa League)	4	—		42	19
Brøndby IF	2017–18	Danish Superliga	30	15	5	6	4	0	—		39	21
Brøndby IF	2018–19	Danish Superliga	33	21	3	2	4	3	1 (Note: Appearance in Danish Superliga Europa League play-off)	1	41	27
Brøndby IF	2019–20	Danish Superliga	18	17	1	0	6	3	—		25	20
Brøndby IF	Total		124	71	15	10	22	10	1	1	162	92
Göztepe	2019–20	Süper Lig	14	1	0	0	—		—		14	1
Copenhagen	2020–21	Danish Superliga	27	10	2	0	3	1	—		32	11
Copenhagen	2021–22	Danish Superliga	6	1	1	0	7 (Note: Appearances in UEFA Europa Conference League)	2	—		14	3
Copenhagen	Total		33	11	3	0	10	3	0	0	46	14
Piast Gliwice	2021–22	Ekstraklasa	13	5	1	0	—		—		14	5
Piast Gliwice	2022–23	Ekstraklasa	28	9	1	0	—		—		29	9
Piast Gliwice	2023–24	Ekstraklasa	12	2	2	0	—		—		14	2
Piast Gliwice	Total		53	16	4	0	—		—		57	16
Career total			406	142	33	11	33	13	1	1	473	167

=== International ===
Appearances and goals by national team and year
National team	Year	Apps	Goals
Poland	2016	2	0
Poland	2017	1	0
Total		3	0

== Honours ==
Brøndby

- Danish Cup: 2017–18

Individual

- Ekstraklasa top scorer: 2014–15 (20 goals)
- Ekstraklasa Player of the Season: 2014–15
- Ekstraklasa Forward of the Season: 2014–15
- Ekstraklasa Player of the Month: November 2014, May 2015
- Tipsbladet Player of the Spring: 2018
- Brøndby Player of the Year: 2018, 2019
- Superliga Player of the Month: October 2019
