= Frederik Rønnow =

Danish footballer (born 1992)

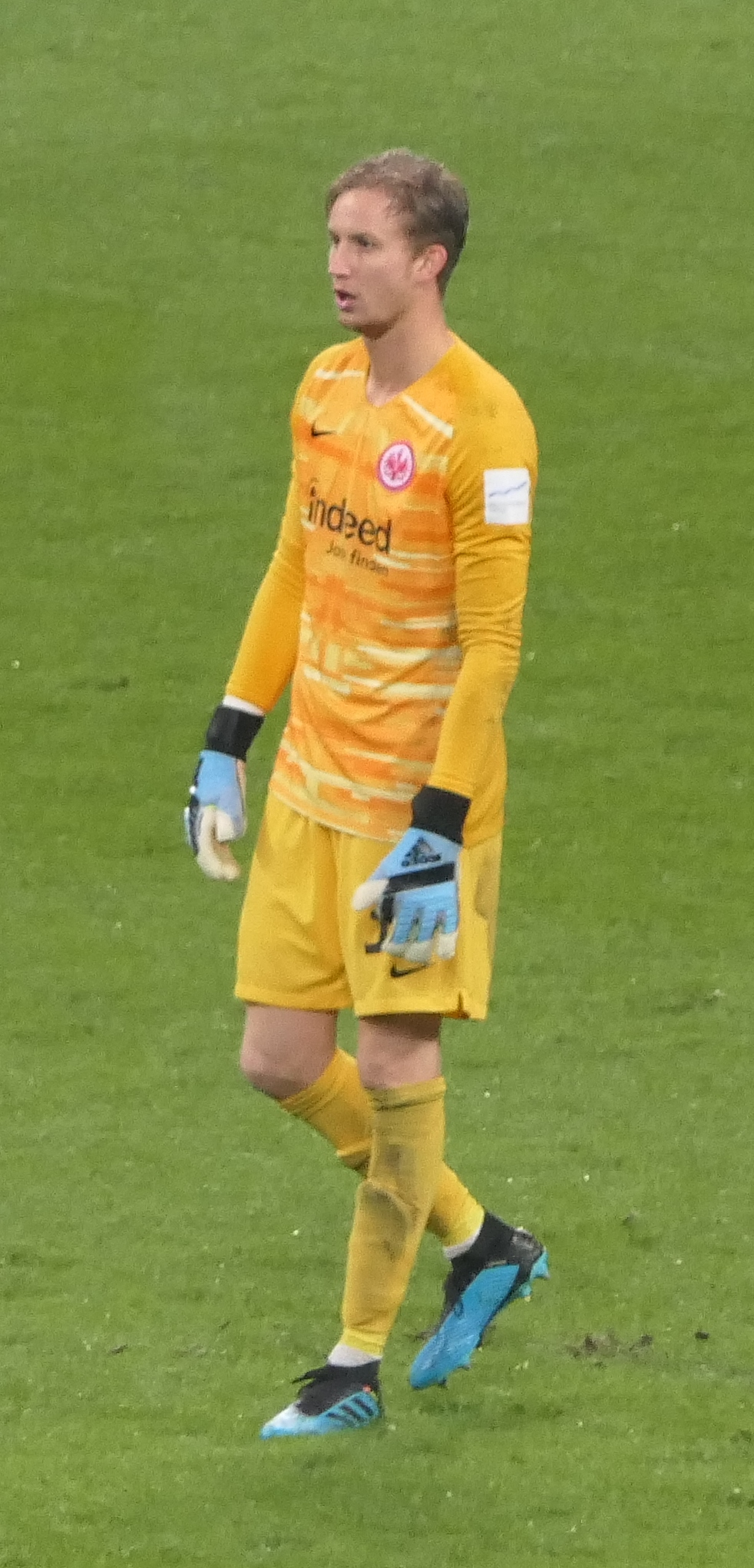
- Rønnow with Eintracht Frankfurt in 2019

Personal information
- Full name: Frederik Riis Rønnow
- Date of birth: 4 August 1992 (age 34)
- Place of birth: Horsens, Denmark
- Height: 1.90 m (6 ft 3 in)
- Position: Goalkeeper

Team information
- Current team: Union Berlin
- Number: 1

Youth career
- Stensballe IK
- AC Horsens

Senior career*
Years	Team	Apps	(Gls)
2010–2015	AC Horsens	69	(0)
2013–2014	→ Esbjerg fB (loan)	26	(0)
2015–2018	Brøndby	119	(0)
2018–2021	Eintracht Frankfurt	21	(0)
2020–2021	→ Schalke 04 (loan)	11	(0)
2021–	Union Berlin	134	(0)

International career
2010	Denmark U18	4	(0)
2010–2011	Denmark U19	3	(0)
2012	Denmark U20	1	(0)
2012–2015	Denmark U21	14	(0)
2016–2024	Denmark	10	(0)
- * Club domestic league appearances and goals as of 1 November 2026

Frederik Riis Rønnow (Danish pronunciation: [ˈfʁeðˀʁek ˈʁiˀs ˈʁɶnʌw, ˈfʁæðˀʁæk -]; born 4 August 1992) is a Danish professional footballer who plays as a goalkeeper for Bundesliga club Union Berlin, and previously for the Denmark national team.

== Club career ==
=== Horsens ===
Rønnow started his career as a youth player at Horsens club Stensballe IK before joining AC Horsens at the age of 16. He made his first team debut on 7 September 2011 in a Danish Cup match against Holstebro, a game Horsens won 5–0.

Already being the first choice goalkeeper for the Danish U21 team, and having been awarded the Horsens Player of the Year Award for the 2012–13 season, Rønnow's agent, former Danish international John Sivebæk, expressed his reluctance for his client to be playing in the Danish 1st Division following Horsens' relegation from the Danish Superliga. As a consequence, on 5 July 2013, Rønnow moved to Superliga club Esbjerg fB on a season-long loan following the departure of Lukáš Hrádecký.

=== Brøndby ===
In July 2015, Rønnow signed a four-year contract with Brøndby IF. He made two appearances in the UEFA Europa League, in which Brøndby were knocked out by PAOK. In the league, he played 33 game as the team finished in fourth place.

In the 2016–17 season, Rønnow played seven games in the Europa League qualifiers in which he was sent off once, as Brøndby were eliminated by Panathinaikos. He also played three times in the Danish Cup tournament and appeared in 34 total matches in regular season as well as the championship round.

In his final season with Brøndby, the 2017–18 season, the team finished second in the league and won the cup by beating Silkeborg IF 3–1 under head coach Alexander Zorniger.

=== Eintracht Frankfurt ===
In April 2018 it was announced that Rønnow would join Eintracht Frankfurt in July 2018, again mirroring the movements of Hrádecký. He made his debut in the German Super Cup on 12 August 2018.

He was brought in to be the starting goalkeeper and appeared in Eintracht's first three competitive games. Due to insecure performances, Eintracht loaned Kevin Trapp from Paris Saint-Germain shortly before the end of the summer transfer window, and Rønnow lost his starting spot. During his first season he made a total of two appearances in the league and in Europa League, in which Frankfurt reached the semi-finals. Trapp signed a permanent deal after the 2018–19 season, but suffered an injury and was sidelined for large parts of the first half of the 2019–20 season. Rønnow replaced him in goal and was able to convince with strong performances.

==== Loan to Schalke 04 ====
On 30 September 2020, he joined Schalke 04 on a year-long loan. He initially replaced Ralf Fährmann as the starting goalkeeper, making seven Bundesliga appearances. Then, he fell out with an injury; Schalke's managers Manuel Baum, Huub Stevens, Christian Gross and Dimitrios Grammozis relied on the services of Fährmann again after his recovery, which meant that Rønnow only came to four more appearances by the end of the season after Fährmann was sidelined with an injury. With Schalke, he suffered relegation to the 2. Bundesliga at the end of the season and he then subsequently returned to Frankfurt.

=== Union Berlin ===
On 20 July 2021, Rønnow joined Union Berlin on a three-year contract, and would initially start his stint with the club as a backup to starter Andreas Luthe. He made his debut on 27 October in a DFB-Pokal match against Waldhof Mannheim, which ended in a 3–1 win.

== International career ==
After playing for several Danish youth teams, he was called up to represent the senior Denmark national team on 9 March 2016 by new head coach Åge Hareide, for friendly matches against Iceland and Scotland.

In June 2018 he was named in Denmark's squad for the 2018 FIFA World Cup in Russia.

In June 2021, he was included in the national team's bid for 2020 UEFA Euro, where the team reached the semi-finals, but did not play in a single match.

Rønnow retired from international football on 5 November 2024, making the announcement on his personal Instagram. In March 2026 he came back to the Danish national team for the 2026 World Cup play-offs, as both Kasper Schmeichel and Filip Jörgensen were out injured.

== Career statistics ==
=== Club ===
As of match played 1 November 2026

Appearances and goals by club, season and competition
Club	Season	League			National cup (Note: Includes Danish Cup, DFB-Pokal)		Europe		Other		Total	
Club	Season	Division	Apps	Goals	Apps	Goals	Apps	Goals	Apps	Goals	Apps	Goals
Horsens	2010–11	Danish Superliga	0	0	0	0	—		—		0	0
Horsens	2011–12	Danish Superliga	11	0	5	0	—		—		16	0
Horsens	2012–13	Danish Superliga	33	0	4	0	4 (Note: Appearances in UEFA Europa League)	0	—		41	0
Horsens	2014–15	Danish 1st Division	12	0	0	0	—		—		12	0
Horsens	Total		56	0	9	0	4	0	—		69	0
Esbjerg (loan)	2013–14	Danish Superliga	18	0	0	0	8	0	—		26	0
Brøndby	2015–16	Danish Superliga	29	0	3	0	2	0	—		34	0
Brøndby	2016–17	Danish Superliga	34	0	3	0	7	0	—		44	0
Brøndby	2017–18	Danish Superliga	36	0	2	0	3	0	—		41	0
Brøndby	Total		99	0	8	0	12	0	—		119	0
Eintracht Frankfurt	2018–19	Bundesliga	2	0	1	0	2	0	1 (Note: Appearance in DFL-Supercup)	0	6	0
Eintracht Frankfurt	2019–20	Bundesliga	9	0	1	0	5	0	—		15	0
Eintracht Frankfurt	Total		11	0	2	0	7	0	1	0	21	0
Schalke 04 (loan)	2020–21	Bundesliga	11	0	0	0	—		—		11	0
Union Berlin	2021–22	Bundesliga	7	0	3	0	3 (Note: Appearances in UEFA Europa Conference League)	0	—		13	0
Union Berlin	2022–23	Bundesliga	29	0	2	0	10	0	—		41	0
Union Berlin	2023–24	Bundesliga	33	0	2	0	6 (Note: Appearances in UEFA Champions League)	0	—		41	0
Union Berlin	2024–25	Bundesliga	28	0	2	0	—		—		30	0
Union Berlin	2025–26	Bundesliga	30	0	3	0	—		—		33	0
Union Berlin	2026–27	Bundesliga	7	0	0	0	—		—		7	0
Union Berlin	Total		134	0	12	0	19	0	—		165	0
Career total			329	0	31	0	50	0	1	0	411	0

=== International ===
Appearances and goals by national team and year
National team	Year	Apps	Goals
Denmark	2016	4	0
Denmark	2017	2	0
Denmark	2018	1	0
Denmark	2019	0	0
Denmark	2020	1	0
Denmark	2021	0	0
Denmark	2022	0	0
Denmark	2023	0	0
Denmark	2024	2	0
Total		10	0

== Honours ==
Brøndby

- Danish Cup: 2017–18
