= Svenn Crone =

Danish footballer (born 1995)

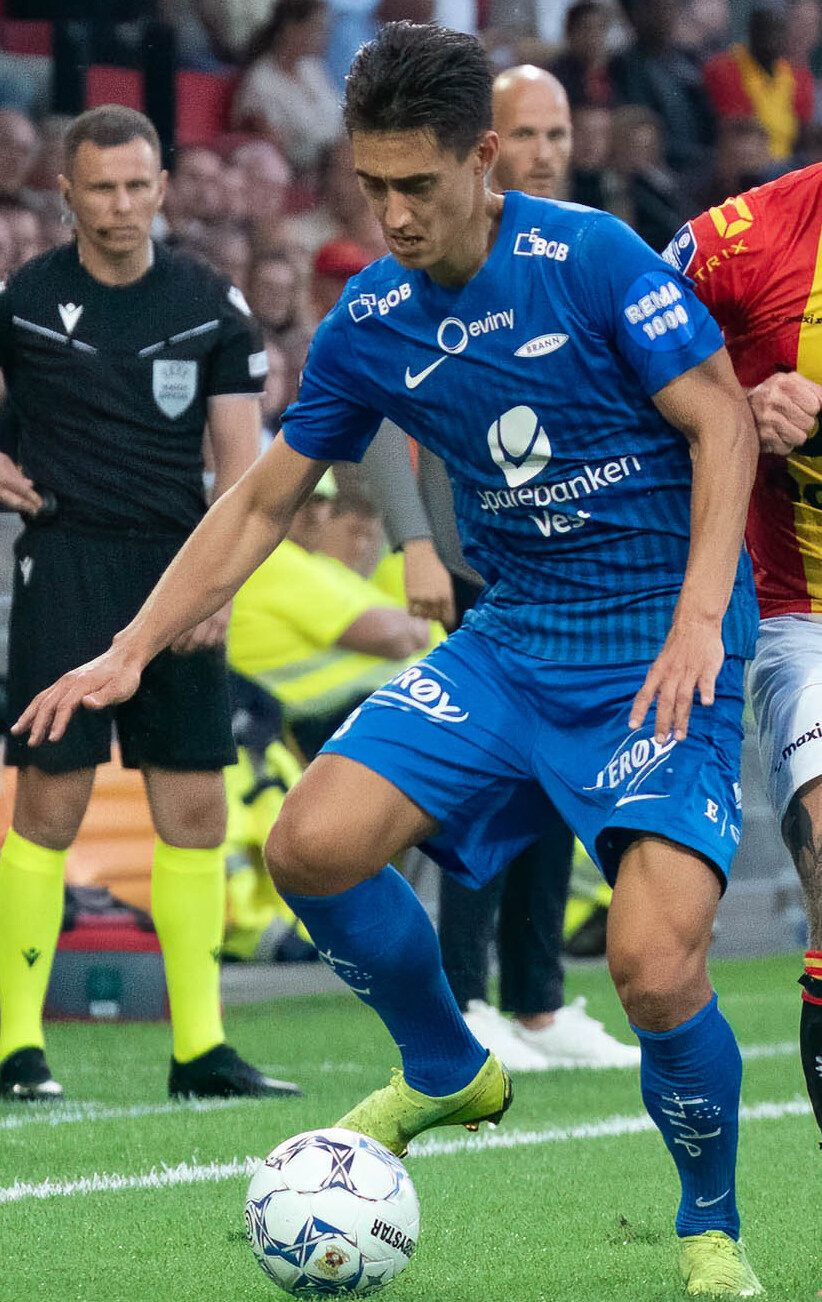

Personal information
- Date of birth: 20 May 1995 (age 31)
- Place of birth: Rødovre, Denmark
- Height: 1.83 m (6 ft 0 in)
- Position: Right-back

Team information
- Current team: Fredericia
- Number: 12

Youth career
- 2000–2005: Boldklubben Rødovre
- 2005–2014: Brøndby

Senior career*
Years	Team	Apps	(Gls)
2014–2018	Brøndby	46	(0)
2015	→ Brønshøj (loan)	11	(0)
2018–2021	Silkeborg	72	(3)
2021–2022	Lyngby	26	(2)
2022–2024	Brann	73	(2)
2025–	Fredericia	40	(4)

International career
2010–2011	Denmark U16	7	(0)
2011–2012	Denmark U17	14	(1)
2012–2013	Denmark U18	5	(0)
2013–2014	Denmark U19	4	(0)
2014	Denmark U20	1	(0)
- * Club domestic league appearances and goals as of 19 May 2026

Svenn Crone (Danish pronunciation: [ˈsvenˀ ˈkʰʁoːnə]; born 20 May 1995) is a Danish professional footballer who plays as a right-back for Danish Superliga club FC Fredericia.

Born in Rødovre, Crone progressed through the Brøndby IF youth academy before being promoted to the first team in July 2014. After a loan to Brønshøj Boldklub, he began making an impact for Brøndby under head coach Alexander Zorniger as a left-back. In 2018, he signed with Silkeborg IF where he grew out to become team captain, before moving to Lyngby Boldklub in January 2021.

Besides his club career, Crone has represented Denmark at youth levels between U16 and U20.

== Career ==
=== Brøndby ===
Crone signed a three-year extension to his contract on 18 September 2013 which ties him to Brøndby until the summer 2017 and secured him a slot in the first team from the summer 2014. Crone was, despite his status as U19 player, brought into the first-team squad during the winter training camp during January 2014 in the United Arab Emirates. He made his first unofficial first-team appearance during that training camp, in the 73rd minute of a friendly against defending Ukrainian champions Shakhtar Donetsk in Abu Dhabi, where he came on as a right-back.

Crone was eventually officially included in the first-team squad on 1 July 2014. He made his official debut for Brøndby in a Danish Cup match against Fremad Amager on 29 October 2014, and on 27 November he signed a contract extension, keeping him at the club until the summer of 2017. Appearances were, however, few and far between, and on 2 February 2015, the last day of the transfer window, Crone was sent on a six-month loan to Brønshøj Boldklub in the second-tier 1st Division.

Crone made his first European appearance after returning to Brøndby from his loan, coming on as a late second-half substitute for Lebogang Phiri in a 0–2 away win over Sammarinese club Juvenes/Dogana in the first qualifying round of the 2015–16 UEFA Europa League. He made his debut in the Danish Superliga for Brøndby on 13 March 2016, when he came on as a substitute in the 46th minute instead of Martin Ørnskov in a 1–0 win at home over Randers FC. He subsequently played the following three successive matches in the Superliga as a substitute, and in the second last matchday of the season he made his first start and played the entire match against Hobro IK.

Under new head coach Alexander Zorniger, who arrived prior to the 2016–17 season, Crone made an impact as a left-back after Riza Durmisi had moved Real Betis. However, after the signing of Anthony Jung, Crone was benched. He made 62 total appearances for Brøndby, in which he scored one goal.

=== Silkeborg ===
On 25 June 2018, Crone signed a three-year contract with Silkeborg IF in the 1st Division. He was appointed team captain in summer 2020. In October 2020, he tested positive for COVID-19 alongside fellow Silkeborg players Jeppe Gertsen and Pelle Mattsson.

=== Lyngby ===
On transfer deadline day, 1 February 2021, Crone joined Lyngby Boldklub on a deal until the June 2023. He made his debut for the club on 7 February in a 1–0 away loss to AGF, coming on as a substitute in the 63rd minute for Kasper Jørgensen. He suffered relegation to the Danish 1st Division with the club on 9 May 2021 after a loss to last placed AC Horsens.

=== Brann ===
On 27 February 2022, Crone signed for Norwegian First Division club Brann on a deal until the end of 2024. He made his debut for the club on 12 March, starting at right back in a fourth round Norwegian Football Cup defeat to KFUM-Kameratene Oslo. His first league appearance followed on the first matchday of the season, on 3 April, in a 4–0 away victory against Ranheim.

=== FC Fredericia ===
On March 3, 2025, Crone joined Danish 1st Division side FC Fredericia on a short-term deal until the end of the season. On 22 May 2025, after FC Fredericia achieved promotion to the Danish Superliga, Crone extended his contract until summer 2028.

== Career statistics ==
As of 3 December 2023

Appearances and goals by club, season and competition
Club	Season	League			Cup		Continental		Total	
Club	Season	Division	Apps	Goals	Apps	Goals	Apps	Goals	Apps	Goals
Brøndby	2014–15	Superliga	0	0	1	0	0	0	1	0
Brøndby	2015–16	Superliga	4	0	1	0	1 (Note: Appearance(s) in the UEFA Europa League)	0	6	0
Brøndby	2016–17	Superliga	29	0	3	1	6	0	38	1
Brøndby	2017–18	Superliga	13	0	1	0	3	0	17	0
Brøndby	Total		46	0	6	1	10	0	62	1
Brønshøj (loan)	2014–15	1st Division	11	0	1	0	—		12	0
Silkeborg	2018–19	1st Division	32	1	3	0	—		35	1
Silkeborg	2019–20	Superliga	26	1	4	0	—		30	1
Silkeborg	2020–21	1st Division	14	1	2	0	—		16	1
Silkeborg	Total		72	3	9	0	—		81	3
Lyngby	2020–21	Superliga	13	0	1	0	—		14	0
Lyngby	2021–22	1st Division	4	2	1	0	—		5	2
Total			17	2	2	0	—		19	2
Brann	2022	First Division	30	2	5	0	-		35	2
Brann	2023	Eliteserien	27	0	7	2	4	0	38	2
Brann	2024	Eliteserien	16	0	1	0	1	0	18	0
Total			73	2	13	2	5	0	91	4
Career total			219	7	26	3	15	0	260	10

== Honours ==
Brøndby

- Danish Cup: 2017–18

Brann

- Norwegian Cup: 2022–23
