= Patrick da Silva (Danish footballer) =

Danish footballer (born 1994)

Personal information
- Date of birth: 23 October 1994 (age 32)
- Place of birth: Kalundborg, Denmark
- Height: 1.72 m (5 ft 8 in)
- Position: Left-back

Youth career
- Raklev GI
- 2011–2013: Brøndby

Senior career*
Years	Team	Apps	(Gls)
2013–2016	Brøndby	42	(0)
2015–2016	→ Randers (loan)	4	(0)
2017–2018	Nordsjælland	13	(0)
2018–2019	Roskilde	20	(0)
2019–2020	Lyngby	31	(2)
2021	Tårnby FF	24	(5)
2022–2024	KÍ	63	(0)
2025	FC Kalundborg		

International career
2013	Denmark U19	5	(1)
2013	Denmark U20	2	(0)
2015–2016	Denmark U21	8	(1)
- * Club domestic league appearances and goals as of 15 July 2024

Patrick da Silva (born 23 October 1994) is a Danish professional footballer who plays as a left back. He has represented Denmark at the youth level.

== Career ==
=== Brøndby ===
Da Silva made his Brøndby IF debut (in jersey number 35) at the age of eighteen. He was in the starting line-up in a 0–2 home defeat against Randers FC on 3 March 2013. He retained his spot, despite the fact that he formally belonged to Brøndby IF's U19 squad, for the remaining 13 games of the season in which Brøndby got clear of relegation and ended up as 9th in the Danish Superliga.

Da Silva got his first call-up for the Danish national U19 team on 19 March 2013 by national U19 coach Thomas Frank. Patrick got his international debut in the away 1–1 draw against France U19 on Stade de Auch and he scored his first U19-international goal 4 June 2013 in the 5–0 win against the Czech Republic in the UEFA Elite Round.

Da Silva got promoted to the first team 1 July 2013 and was handed the jersey number 23.

On 25 June Patrick signed a new tree-year contract extension until 30 June 2018 despite a season with limited appearances due to being head coach Thomas Frank's second choice as left wingback after the Danish International U21 starlet Riza Durmisi.

Da Silva started the 2015–16 season with a slot among the starting-11 in a staggering 9–0 home victory against the San Marino side A.C. Juvenes/Dogana in the Europa League qualification which he crowned with scoring his first European goal.

On 31 October 2016, da Silva and BIF agreed to terminate the contract.

=== Nordsjælland ===
Da Silva joined FC Nordsjælland on 26 January 2017 on a 2.5-year contract.

After a defeat against Lyngby Boldklub on 12 May 2017, Da Silva was spotted going out clubbing the same night. This violated the rules of FCN and several medias wrote, that he would be suspended. Meanwhile, nothing was confirmed. The next day, manager Kasper Hjulmand confirmed the episode and said, that Silva would be suspended for an unknown period. Da Silva was not in the squad for the next game against FC Midtjylland.

=== Roskilde ===
In September 2018 da Silva signed a contract with Danish 1st Division club FC Roskilde.

=== Lyngby ===
On 23 June 2019, Lyngby BK announced that they had signed da Silva on a three-year contract. It was a relief for da Silva to focus on football and have things calm down as this allowed for him to get closer to his top level. On 5 October 2020 the club confirmed, that da Silva's deal had been terminated by mutual consent.

=== Tårnby FF ===
After leaving Lyngby, da Silva flew to Brazil to try himself out at different clubs. However, he ended up returning to Denmark and in May 2021, he confirmed that he had joined Denmark Series club Tårnby FF. He made his debut on 9 May in a 3–3 draw against Karlslunde IF. On 28 May, he scored his first goal for the club in a 3–0 home win over RB 1906. He finished his stint with Tårnby with 26 appearances, in which he scored six goals.

=== KÍ ===
On 2 December 2021 Faroese club KÍ Klaksvík confirmed that da Silva had signed with the club. He is making history with the club as they reached the group stage of a European competition, something that has never happened in the history of a Faroese team. Patrick scored one of the goals in the 1–1 draw with Sheriff in the Europa League playoffs, pre-group stage. On 25 October 2024 the KÍ confirmed that the contract has been cancelled due to his arrest on new charges for sexual crimes committed in Denmark.

== Personal life ==
Patrick took the surname of his mother, a Brazilian who hails from Recife. His father is Danish.

=== Sexual crimes and conviction ===
In March 2020, da Silva began communicating over social media with a 14-year-old female, sending sexually explicit photographs and videos on Snapchat. He had contacted her a few days earlier on Instagram. After the episode, the victim's family chose to report da Silva to the police and at the same time contacted his employer, Lyngby Boldklub. In March 2021, da Silva was sentenced to 20 days probation and must, in addition to the costs of the case, pay DKK 8,000 in compensation to the victim. As the injunction was lifted in November 2021, it was revealed that da Silva was the perpetrator.

In late October 2024, da Silva was arrested and held in custodial arrest by the Løgregla for "various sexual crimes committed in Denmark".

During 2025, Da Silva returned to his hometown Kalundborg, where he began playing for the amateur club FC Kalundborg. This, however, came to an abrupt halt at the end of September 2025 when the club chose to remove him from the team, as a result of a new indictment against Da Silva regarding child abuse. Da Silva was indicted on several charges – including rape by sexual intercourse other than coitus, attempted coitus with a child under 15 for payment, grooming, indecent assault, and sharing of pornographic material of minors.

== Career statistics ==
As of 4 July 2019

Club	Season	League			Cup		Europa League		Other		Total	
Club	Season	Tier	Apps	Goals	Apps	Goals	Apps	Goals	Apps	Goals	Apps	Goals
Brøndby	2012–13	T1	12	0	2	0	-	-	-	-	14	0
Brøndby	2013–14	T1	10	0	1	0	-	-	-	-	11	0
Brøndby	2014–15	T1	16	0	3	0	0	0	-	-	19	0
Brøndby	Total		38	0	6	0	0	0	0	0	44	0
Randers FC	2015–16	T1	4	0	1	0	-	-	-	-	5	0
Randers FC	Total		4	0	1	0	0	0	0	0	5	0
Brøndby	2015–16	T1	3	0	0	0	2	1	-	-	5	1
Brøndby	2016–17	T1	1	0	0	0	2	0	-	-	3	0
Brøndby	Total		4	0	0	0	4	1	0	0	8	1
FC Nordsjælland	2016–17	T1	2	0	0	0	-	-	-	-	2	0
FC Nordsjælland	2017–18	T1	11	0	2	0	-	-	-	-	13	0
FC Nordsjælland	Total		13	0	2	0	0	0	0	0	15	0
FC Roskilde	2018–19	T2	20	0	0	0	-	-	-	-	20	0
FC Roskilde	Total		20	0	0	0	0	0	0	0	20	0
Career total			79	0	9	0	4	1	0	0	92	1

- (-) Not qualified
