= Andrew Hjulsager =

Danish footballer (born 1995)

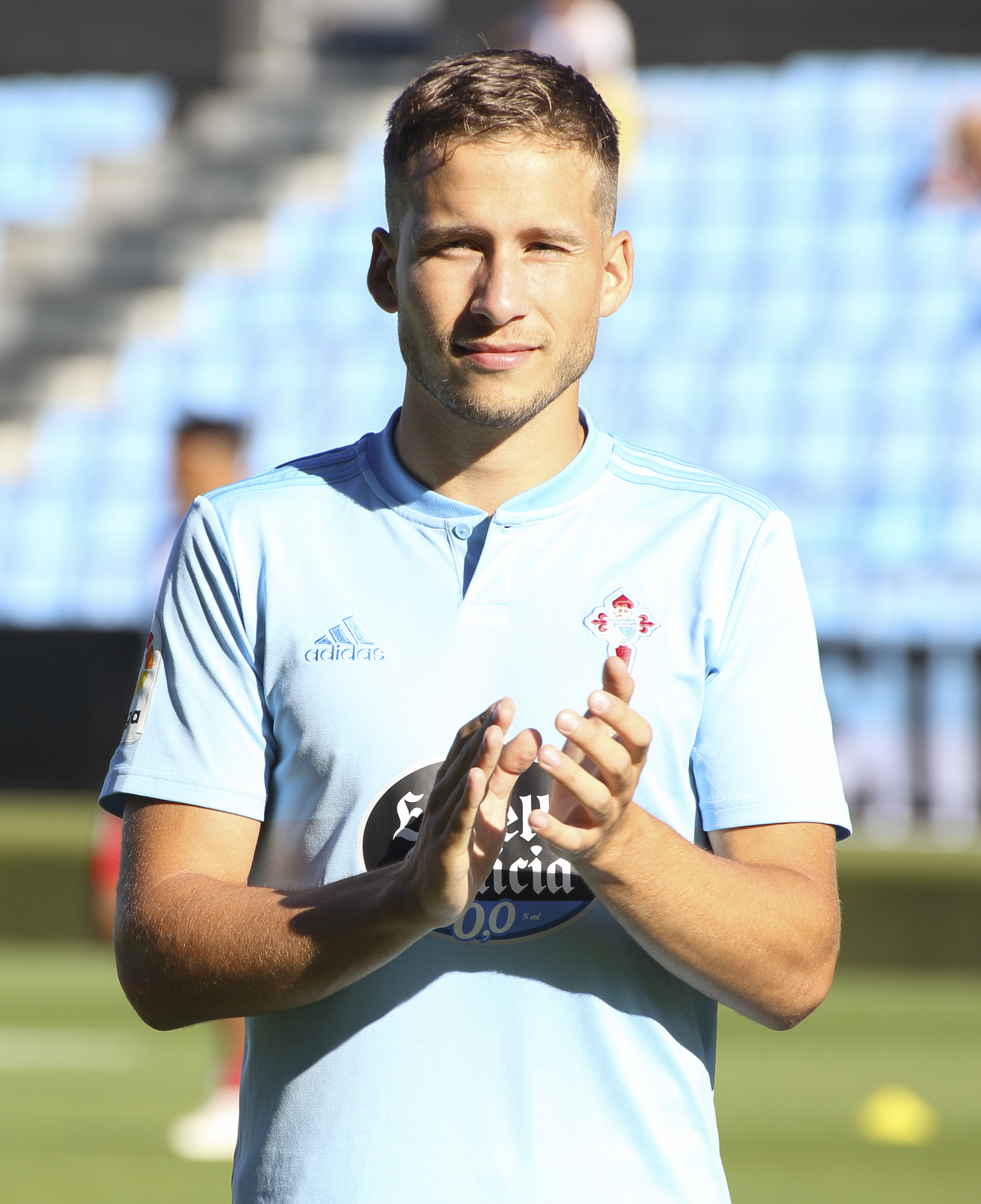
- Hjulsager with Celta in 2018

Personal information
- Date of birth: 15 January 1995 (age 31)
- Place of birth: Amager, Denmark
- Height: 1.75 m (5 ft 9 in)
- Position: Attacking midfielder

Team information
- Current team: Vejle
- Number: 17

Youth career
- 2000–2004: Fremad Amager
- 2004–2013: Brøndby IF

Senior career*
Years	Team	Apps	(Gls)
2013–2016	Brøndby IF	80	(16)
2017–2019	Celta	24	(1)
2018	→ Granada (loan)	6	(0)
2019–2021	Oostende	56	(8)
2021–2025	Gent	67	(7)
2025–	Vejle	24	(2)

International career
2010–2011	Denmark U16	9	(2)
2011–2012	Denmark U17	14	(1)
2012–2013	Denmark U19	11	(4)
2012–2014	Denmark U20	5	(0)
2014–2017	Denmark U21	26	(4)
- * Club domestic league appearances and goals as of 19 May 2026

Andrew Hjulsager (born 15 January 1995) is a Danish professional footballer who plays for Danish club Vejle as an attacking midfielder.

== Career ==
=== Brøndby IF ===
On 25 October 2012, Hjulsager signed a two-year extension to his contract which tying him to the club until summer 2015.

Hjulsager made his debut at the age of 18, starting as a right winger in the first match of the season, a 1–1 home draw against FC Vestsjælland on 21 July 2013. He crowned his debut with a goal which made him the second youngest goalscorer in the history of Brøndby IF.

On 22 August 2013, Hjulsager signed a new four-year contract until summer 2017. He ended season 2013–14 with 23 appearances and four goals despite the fact that he formally belonged to Brøndby IF's under-19 squad. His performance made UEFA named him the Danish league "One to Watch" in the annual Danish season review due to his impressive ability to read the game combined with his superior technique, incredible pace and offensive mindset.

Hjulsager started the season with a slot among the starting eleven in a 9–0 home victory against the San Marino side Juvenes/Dogana in the UEFA Europa League qualification.

=== Celta ===
On 31 January 2017, Hjulsager signed a three-and-a-half-year contract with La Liga side Celta de Vigo.

On 31 January 2018, Hjulsager was loaned to Segunda División side Granada CF until the end of the season.

=== Oostende ===
On 12 July 2019, it was confirmed that Belgium side Oostende has secured the signing of Andrew Hjulsager from Celta Vigo. The Spanish club reserved a right to a percentage of any future sale of the player.

=== Gent ===
On 11 June 2021, Hjulsager signed a four-year contract with Belgian Pro League club Gent. The deal was reported to be around €2 million.

=== Vejle Boldklub ===
On 29 June 2025, Hjulsager returned to his home country to play for Danish Superliga club Vejle on a three-year deal.

== Career statistics ==
As of 2 February 2025

Appearances and goals by club, season and competition
Club	Season	League			Cup (Note: Includes Danish Cup, Copa del Rey, Belgian Cup)		Continental		Other		Total	
Club	Season	Division	Apps	Goals	Apps	Goals	Apps	Goals	Apps	Goals	Apps	Goals
Brøndby IF	2013–14	Superliga	22	4	1	0	—		—		23	4
Brøndby IF	2014–15	Superliga	20	4	1	0	0	0	—		21	4
Brøndby IF	2015–16	Superliga	19	1	2	1	6 (Note: Appearance(s) in UEFA Europa League)	0	—		27	2
Brøndby IF	2016–17	Superliga	19	7	0	0	8	1	—		27	8
Brøndby IF	Total		80	16	4	1	14	1	—		98	18
Celta	2016–17	La Liga	7	1	0	0	0	0	—		7	1
Celta	2017–18	La Liga	2	0	2	0	—		—		4	0
Celta	2018–19	La Liga	15	0	2	0	—		—		17	0
Celta	Total		24	1	4	0	0	0	—		28	1
Granada (loan)	2017–18	Segunda División	6	0	0	0	—		—		6	0
Oostende	2019–20	Belgian Pro League	19	2	1	0	—		—		20	2
Oostende	2020–21	Belgian Pro League	32	3	2	1	—		5 (Note: Appearance(s) in play-off)	3	39	7
Oostende	Total		51	5	3	1	—		5	3	59	9
Gent	2021–22	Belgian Pro League	24	3	5	0	8 (Note: Appearance(s) in UEFA Conference League)	0	—		37	3
Gent	2022–23	Belgian Pro League	20	2	2	1	8 (Note: Two appearances in UEFA Europa League, six appearances and one goal in UEFA Conference League)	1	5 (Note: One appearance in Belgian Super Cup and four appearances and one goal in play-off)	1	35	5
Gent	2023–24	Belgian Pro League	13	0	1	0	4	0	5 (Note: Appearance(s) in play-off)	2	23	2
Gent	2024–25	Belgian Pro League	7	0	1	0	0	0	0	0	8	0
Gent	Total		64	5	9	1	20	1	10	3	103	10
Career total			225	27	20	3	34	2	15	6	294	38

== Honours ==
Gent

- Belgian Cup: 2021–22

Individual

- Andrew Hjulsager was rewarded under-19 talent of the year 2013 by the Danish Football Association
