= Frederik Holst (footballer) =

Danish footballer (born 1994)

Personal information
- Full name: Frederik Lucas Holst
- Date of birth: 24 September 1994 (age 32)
- Place of birth: Vanløse, Denmark
- Height: 1.77 m (5 ft 10 in)
- Position: Midfielder

Team information
- Current team: Fremad Amager
- Number: 7

Youth career
- 2000–2007: BK Union
- 2007–2012: Brøndby

Senior career*
Years	Team	Apps	(Gls)
2012–2017	Brøndby	126	(2)
2017–2018	Sparta Rotterdam	28	(0)
2018–2022	Elfsborg	92	(5)
2022	Lillestrøm	13	(0)
2023	Helsingborg	15	(0)
2023	UTA Arad	2	(0)
2024	07 Vestur	13	(0)
2024–2025	Fremad Amager	22	(0)
2025	Hvidovre	2	(0)
2026–	Fremad Amager	24	(1)

International career
2010	Denmark U16	2	(1)
2009–2011	Denmark U17	31	(2)
2011	Denmark U18	2	(0)
2012–2013	Denmark U19	14	(0)
2013	Denmark U20	2	(0)
2014–2017	Denmark U21	22	(0)
2016	Denmark Olympic	1	(0)
- * Club domestic league appearances and goals as of 3 October 2026

Frederik Lucas Holst (Danish pronunciation: [ˈhʌlst]; born 24 September 1994) is a Danish professional footballer who plays as a right-back for Danish 2nd Division club Fremad Amager. He also has represented Denmark at youth level.

== Career ==
=== Brøndby ===
==== 2011–12 season ====
On 9 May 2012, Holst signed a new two-and-a-half-year Brøndby IF contract, which tied him to the club until the end of 2014. He made his Brøndby IF debut (in jersey number 31) at the age of 17 as the youngest player ever in the club history when he was brought on for the final five minutes in the 5–1 away defeat against AGF on 13 May 2012. Daniel Stückler later became the youngest debutante for Brøndby IF during 2014.

==== 2012–13 season ====
On 26 September 2012, Holst scored his first senior goal for Brøndby. It was the final goal in the 3–0 home win against the Danish first division side B93 in the DBU Cup. He was named man of the match for his performance in that game.

His talent caught the attention from scouts all over Europe. Fellow Danish Superliga club FC Nordsjælland reportedly tried to exploit Brøndby IF's critical financial situation and offered €130,000 for the young starlet in the January 2013 transfer window but Brøndby rejected the offer.

Frederik Holst ended the 2012–13 season with 24 appearances, in which he was in the starting line-up 17 times, despite the fact that he formally belonged to Brøndby IF's under-19 squad.

==== 2013–14 season ====
Holst was officially promoted to the first team on 1 July 2013 and was handed jersey number 12. On 30 September 2013, he signed a new four-year contract which tied him to the club until the summer 2017. Holst had a good season with 30 appearances mostly as right-back, where he managed to push the newly signed Swedish international Michael Almebäck to a seat on the bench. His performance was crowned with a debut at the Danish U21 international team.

==== 2014–15 season ====
On 31 July 2014, Holst made his Europa League debut when he was brought in for the final five minutes in the 3–0 away defeat against the Belgium side Club Brugge. In the first half of the season, he again managed to claim the position as right-back from former Swedish international Almebäck who was shipped off to Esbjerg fB on a one-year loan. Brøndby IF decided to give him another unseen challenge as they signed Elfsborgs captain and Swedish international Johan Larsson on a four-year contract during the winter transfer window.

The addition of Larsson meant Holst competed with three right-backs as the under-19 and International starlet Svenn Crone was also included in the first team. Multiple rumours reported that Brøndby IF made a last hour offer to the fellow Superliga club SønderjyskE to add Holst on a loan for the rest of the season. SønderjyskE rejected the offer after serious consideration and instead Crone was sent on loan at Brønshøj BK.

==== 2015–16 season ====
Holst started the season with a slot in the starting 11 as a central midfielder in a 9–0 home victory against the San Marino side A.C. Juvenes/Dogana in the Europa League qualification which he crowned by scoring his first European goal.

Holst made a total of 30 appearances during the season, mainly as a substitute but all of them as a central midfielder in various roles.

==== 2016–17 season ====
Holst had a positive start on the season being among newly signed manager Alexander Zorniger's chosen eleven in season opener against Esbjerg fB on 17 July 2016. He scored his first league goal when he completed a 4–0 home victory against Esbjerg fB, which was the best season opening in 15 years and the first season opening win in 8 years. He left the club at the end of the season, as his contract expired.

=== Sparta Rotterdam ===
On 22 August 2017, Holst joined Eredivisie club Sparta Rotterdam. He made his debut for Sparta against Roda in a 1–2 home defeat.

=== IF Elfsborg ===
On 9 August 2018, Holst joined Allsvenskan club IF Elfsborg. On 31 January 2022, his contract was terminated by mutual consent. He finished his four-year stint with the club with 92 league appearances, in which he scored five goals.

=== Lillestrøm ===
On 18 February 2022, Holst signed a three-year contract with Lillestrøm in Norway. However, on 2 December 2022, the club confirmed that Holst's contract had been terminated by mutual agreement.

=== Helsingborgs IF ===
On 14 February 2023, Holst joined newly relegated Swedish Superettan club Helsingborgs IF on a deal until the end of the year.

=== UTA Arad ===
After six months in Sweden, Holst moved to Romanian Liga I club FC UTA Arad in August 2023. However, the club did not disclose the duration of the contract.

=== 07 Vestur ===
On 12 March 2024, Holst signed with Faroe Islands Premier League club 07 Vestur. He made his debut for the club on 17 March, starting in a 1–0 away victory against ÍF.

=== Fremad Amager ===
On August 12, 2024 Fremad Amager confirmed that Holst moved to the Danish 2nd Division club. He left the club again on 6 July 2025, after terminating his contract by mutual agreement.

=== Hvidovre IF ===
In July 2025, after leaving Fremad Amager, Holst started training with Danish 1st Division side Hvidovre IF. He ended up signing a short-term contract with the club until the end of 2025.

=== Return to Fremad Amager ===
In January 2026, Holst returned to Fremad Amager.

== Career statistics ==
As of match played 27 September 2023

Appearances and goals by club, season and competition
Club	Season	League			National cup		Other		Total	
Club	Season	Division	Apps	Goals	Apps	Goals	Apps	Goals	Apps	Goals
Brøndby	2011–12	Danish Superliga	1	0	0	0	—		1	0
Brøndby	2012–13	Danish Superliga	24	0	5	1	—		29	1
Brøndby	2013–14	Danish Superliga	29	0	1	0	—		30	0
Brøndby	2014–15	Danish Superliga	28	0	1	0	2 (Note: Appearances in UEFA Europa League)	0	31	0
Brøndby	2015–16	Danish Superliga	20	0	3	0	7	1	30	1
Brøndby	2016–17	Danish Superliga	24	2	3	0	6	0	33	2
Brøndby	Total		126	2	13	1	15	1	154	4
Sparta Rotterdam	2017–18	Eredivisie	28	0	1	0	1 (Note: Appearances in Eredivisie promotion/relegation play-offs)	0	30	0
Elfsborg	2018	Allsvenskan	13	1	—		—		13	1
Elfsborg	2019	Allsvenskan	26	1	4	0	—		30	1
Elfsborg	2020	Allsvenskan	27	2	5	0	—		32	2
Elfsborg	2021	Allsvenskan	26	1	3	0	5 (Note: Appearances in UEFA Conference League)	1	34	2
Elfsborg	Total		92	5	12	0	5	1	109	6
Lillestrøm	2022	Eliteserien	13	0	3	0	0	0	16	0
Helsingborg	2023	Superettan	15	0	2	0	—		17	0
UTA Arad	2023–24	Liga I	2	0	2	0	—		4	0
07 Vestur	2024	Betri deildin	0	0	0	0	—		0	0
Career total			276	7	33	1	21	2	330	10

== Honours ==
Brøndby

- Danish Cup runner-up: 2016–17

Lillestrøm

- Norwegian Cup runner-up: 2022–23
