= Peter Friis Jensen =

Danish footballer (born 1988)

Personal information
- Full name: Peter Friis Jensen
- Date of birth: May 2, 1988 (age 38)
- Place of birth: Denmark
- Height: 1.89 m (6 ft 2 in)
- Position: Goalkeeper

Youth career
- IF Midtdjurs
- Randers

Senior career*
Years	Team	Apps	(Gls)
2008–2014	Randers	29	(0)
2014–2017	Viborg	93	(1)
2017–2019	Silkeborg	22	(0)
2019–2021	Vendsyssel	31	(0)
- * Club domestic league appearances and goals

Peter Friis Jensen (born 2 May 1988) is a Danish retired professional footballer who played as a goalkeeper.

== Club career ==
=== Randers ===
Friis is a product of Randers FC, and has played for the team in the most of his youth career. He got his contract extended in June 2007 and signed his first professional contract the following summer. Friis didn't play any games for the first team in this season, but was on the bench for the last two games of the season.

His contract was extended once again after the 2008/09 season until 1 January 2010. Friis was in negotiations with Viborg in November about a new contract, but due to the financial crisis, they couldn't offer him as much as he wanted, even if they wanted to. So his contract expired but 28 days later, he signed a new contract with the club for 6 months. Friis' contract was extended once again after the 6 months, this time until 2012. He played his first game for Randers on 25 August 2010 in a Danish Cup game against VSK Aarhus, which they won 4–1. The first choice, David Ousted, got injured with 4 league games left. Friis played the last 4 games and did very well. In the beginning of the 2012/13, Friis got injured and was operated in his knee. Friis wanted to be the first choice and he considered a move away. He didn't play a single game in the 2012/13 season.

Friis was on the bench for the first 10 games of the season in the following season, but played the rest of the league games.

=== Viborg ===
On 16 July 2014 Viborg FF announced, that they had signed Friis from Randers. After Viborg was relegated to the Danish 1st Division for the 2017/18 season, he left the club together with 5 teammates.

=== Silkeborg ===
Friis signed a two-year contract with Danish Superliga club Silkeborg IF.

=== Vendsyssel ===
On 8 July 2019, Friis signed with Vendsyssel FF. On 22 August 2021, 33-year old Friis confirmed, that he had been forced to retire due to persistent knee problems.
