= Christian Jakobsen =

Danish footballer (born 1993)

Personal information
- Date of birth: 27 March 1993 (age 33)
- Place of birth: Copenhagen, Denmark
- Height: 1.89 m (6 ft 2 in)
- Position: Winger

Team information
- Current team: Þór Akureyri
- Number: 25

Youth career
- BK Skjold
- Hvidovre

Senior career*
Years	Team	Apps	(Gls)
2012–2015	Hvidovre	32	(13)
2015	Roskilde	14	(7)
2015–2017	Brøndby	32	(2)
2017–2020	SønderjyskE	106	(26)
2020–2022	Lyngby	39	(4)
2022–2025	Hvidovre	90	(18)
2025–	Þór Akureyri	35	(5)
- * Club domestic league appearances and goals as of 16 November 2026

Christian "Greko" Jakobsen (Danish pronunciation: [ˈkʰʁestjæn ˈkʁɛko ˈjɑkʌpsn̩, ˈkʰʁæs-]; born 27 March 1993) is a Danish professional footballer who plays for Icelandic Besta deild karla club Þór Akureyri.

== Club career ==
=== Hvidovre ===
A youth product of Hvidovre IF, Greko made his senior debut for the first team as an under-19 player against Rishøj Boldklub. On 2 November 2012, he scored a hat-trick after coming on as a substitute in a 2nd Division match against IF Skjold Birkerød. On 15 January 2013, Greko signed a new two-year contract with Hvidovre.

=== Roskilde ===
On 8 August 2014, it was announced that Greko would be the new signing of FC Roskilde valid from the new year, as he would become a free agent. There, he was set to be the replacement for Emil Nielsen, who had moved to Norwegian club Rosenborg.

He made his debut for Roskilde on 25 March 2015, in a 0–2 defeat against HB Køge in the 1st Division. A strong six-month stretch for the club, in which he scored 7 goals in 14 appearances and became club top goalscorer that season, attracted considerable interest from Danish Superliga clubs.

=== Brøndby ===
On 18 June 2015, Greko signed a four-year contract with Danish Superliga club Brøndby. He made his debut for the club in the Danish Cup, scoring four goals in a 7–0 win over Holbæk B&I.

He made his Superliga debut for Brøndby on 27 September 2015, when he came on the pitch in the 74th minute, replacing Magnus Eriksson in the 1–0 victory against Copenhagen.

=== SønderjyskE ===
Greko signed with SønderjyskE on 28 January 2017. He made his debut for the club 17 February 2017 in a 0–3 defeat against Esbjerg fB. On 21 May, he scored his first goals for the club – a hat-trick – to secure a 3–0 win against his former club Brøndby.

=== Lyngby ===
On 3 August 2020, Greko signed a two-year deal with Lyngby Boldklub. He suffered relegation to the Danish 1st Division with the club on 9 May 2021 after a loss to last placed AC Horsens. On 28 May 2022, Lyngby Boldklub announced that Greko's expiring contract would not be extended, making him a free agent after the 2021–22 season.

=== Return to Hvidovre ===
In June 2022, Greko signed with Hvidovre IF, the club where he had started his career. Greko made his debut on 24 July 2022 against Næstved Boldklub, where he also scored his first goal for his new club.

On 2 July 2024, Greko signed a new 2-year contract with Hvidovre, so it now runs until June 2026.

=== Þór Akureyri ===
On 11 July 2025, Greko moved to Icelandic 1. deild karla club Þór Akureyri on a deal until the end of 2027.

== Personal life ==
Before turning professional at Roskilde, Greko studied economics at the University of Copenhagen next to playing football for Hvidovre.

== Honours ==
SønderjyskE

- Danish Cup: 2019–20
