= Malthe Johansen =

Danish footballer (born 1996)

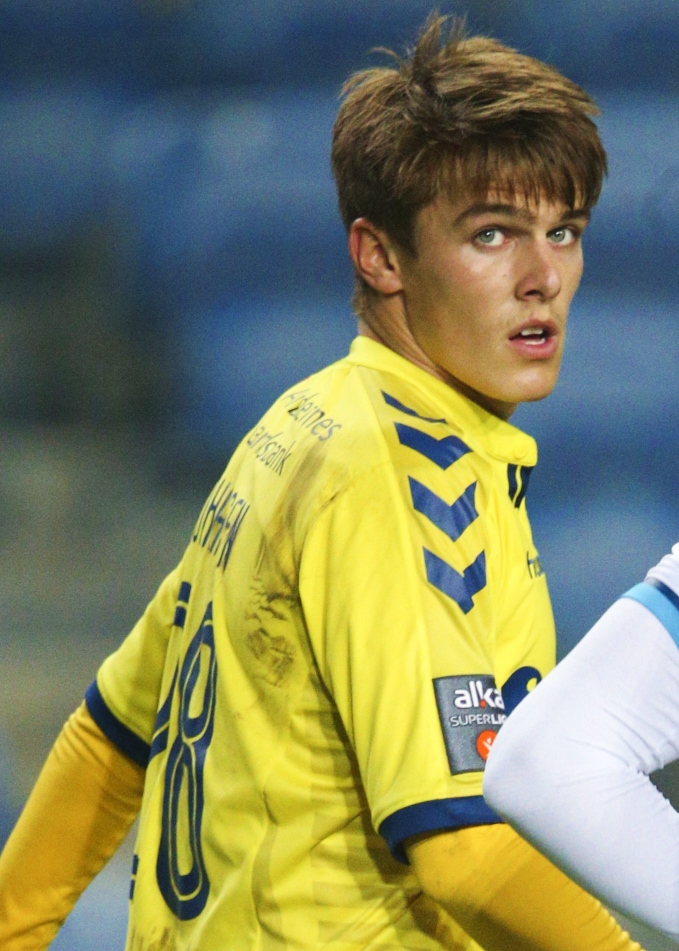
- Johansen in 2016

Personal information
- Full name: Malthe Emil Johansen
- Date of birth: 1 February 1996 (age 30)
- Position: Defender

Youth career
- –2014: Brøndby

Senior career*
Years	Team	Apps	(Gls)
2014–2016	Brøndby	2	(0)
2014–2015	→ Porto B (loan)	1	(0)
- * Club domestic league appearances and goals

Malthe Emil Johansen (born 1 February 1996) is a Danish former professional footballer who played as a defender.

== Career ==
Johansen started his career with Danish top flight side Brøndby, where he made two appearances.

On 30 July 2015, he debuted for Brøndby during a 0–0 draw with Omonia. In 2014, Johansen was sent on loan to Porto B in the Portuguese second tier. At the age of 20, he retired from professional football due to a loss of passion.
