= Riza Durmisi =

Danish footballer (born 1994)

Personal information
- Date of birth: 8 January 1994 (age 32)
- Place of birth: Ishøj, Denmark
- Height: 1.74 m (5 ft 9 in)
- Position: Left-back

Youth career
- 2000–2002: SB 50 Ishøj
- 2002–2013: Brøndby

Senior career*
Years	Team	Apps	(Gls)
2013–2016	Brøndby	93	(7)
2016–2018	Real Betis	51	(3)
2018–2023	Lazio	10	(0)
2020	→ Nice (loan)	4	(0)
2021	→ Salernitana (loan)	5	(0)
2022	→ Sparta Rotterdam (loan)	9	(0)
2022–2023	→ Leganés (loan)	10	(0)
2023	→ Tenerife (loan)	1	(0)
2024	ŁKS Łódź	11	(0)
2025	Nea Salamina	16	(0)
2025	Amazonas	4	(0)
Total		214	(10)

International career
2009–2010	Denmark U16	7	(0)
2009–2011	Denmark U17	27	(1)
2011–2013	Denmark U19	15	(0)
2013–2015	Denmark U21	9	(1)
2015–2018	Denmark	23	(0)
- * Club domestic league appearances and goals

Riza Durmisi (Danish pronunciation: [tuɐ̯ˈmisi]; Albanian: Riza Durmishi; born 8 January 1994) is a Danish former professional footballer who played as a left-back.

Durmisi came through the academy at Brøndby, where he was named the club's player of the year in 2015 before joining La Liga club Real Betis the following year. After two seasons as a regular in Spain, he signed for Lazio in 2018 and won the Coppa Italia in his first season, but played little thereafter and spent most of his five-year contract on loan at Nice, Salernitana, Sparta Rotterdam, Leganés and Tenerife. He later played in Poland, Cyprus and Brazil, and retired in October 2026 at the age of 32.

Durmisi represented Denmark at several youth levels and won 23 caps for the senior national team between 2015 and 2018.

== Early life and career ==
Durmisi was born in Ishøj, a suburb west of Copenhagen, to Albanian parents whose family came from the area around Tetovo, in what was then Yugoslavia. He began playing football with the local club SB 50 Ishøj before joining the Brøndby IF academy.

== Club career ==
=== Brøndby ===
Durmisi made his first-team debut on 26 August 2012 in a 1–1 home draw with Esbjerg fB, and made four substitute appearances during the 2012–13 season. He signed a three-year contract on 24 June 2013, and established himself in the side the following season, playing first as a left winger and later as a left wing-back. He scored his first goal on 10 November 2013 in a 3–0 home win over AGF, and finished the campaign with three goals in 33 matches. On 31 July 2014, he made his UEFA Europa League debut, starting in a 3–0 defeat away to Club Brugge.

On 2 October 2015, Durmisi signed a contract extension until the summer of 2018, reported to contain a €2 million release clause. At the end of the year he was named Brøndby's player of the year, ahead of Daniel Agger and Thomas Kahlenberg. He left Brøndby in May 2016, having made 93 league appearances and scored seven goals, and later credited manager Thomas Frank with persuading him to stay at the club and with launching his career.

=== Real Betis ===
On 28 May 2016, Durmisi signed a five-year contract with La Liga club Real Betis, who activated the €2 million release clause in his Brøndby contract and replaced it with a €20 million clause of their own. He made his debut on 20 August in a 6–2 defeat away to Barcelona.

Durmisi was a regular in his first season in Spain and began the following campaign as the club's only senior left-back, but lost his place in the second half of the season after the emergence of academy graduate Junior Firpo. On 30 April 2018, he scored in a 2–1 win over Málaga that secured Betis qualification for the Europa League. He made 51 league appearances and scored three goals in two seasons at the club.

=== Lazio ===
On 22 June 2018, Durmisi signed a five-year contract with Lazio for a reported fee of €6.5 million. He made his debut on 25 August in a 2–0 defeat away to Juventus, and made 19 appearances in his first season, seven of them as a starter, among them the last 16 and quarter-finals of the Coppa Italia, which Lazio won. Italian media attributed his limited role in part to injuries. He did not play for the club again after January 2020, spending the remainder of his contract on loan or on the margins of the squad.

On 6 December 2019, Nice announced an agreement to sign Durmisi on loan from January 2020 until the end of the season. He made his debut on 5 January in a 2–0 Coupe de France win over Fréjus Saint-Raphaël, but added only five league appearances before returning to Lazio. On 22 January 2021, he joined Serie B club Salernitana on loan, making five appearances, all as a substitute, as the club won promotion to Serie A.

Back at Lazio for the 2021–22 season, Durmisi was left out of the second phase of pre-season training by new coach Maurizio Sarri and remained on the fringes of the squad. On 31 January 2022, he joined Eredivisie club Sparta Rotterdam on loan for the rest of the season. He spent the following season in the Spanish Segunda División, joining Leganés on a season-long loan on 1 September 2022 before moving to Tenerife on another loan on 30 January 2023. A meniscus injury sustained shortly after his debut for Tenerife kept him out for several months, and his Lazio contract expired in June 2023.

=== Later career and retirement ===
After six months as a free agent, Durmisi signed a six-month contract on 8 January 2024 with ŁKS Łódź, then bottom of the Ekstraklasa. He made his debut on 18 February, starting in a 2–0 defeat to Widzew Łódź in the Łódź derby, and made 11 appearances before leaving when his contract expired.

On 2 January 2025, Durmisi joined Nea Salamina, who were bottom of the Cypriot First Division, on a deal until the end of the season. He made 16 league appearances in a season that ended in relegation for the club.

In May 2025, Durmisi signed for Campeonato Brasileiro Série B club Amazonas until the end of the year, moving outside Europe for the first time. He made four appearances, the last of them in September, when he was sent off after 11 minutes of a defeat away to CRB. He left when his contract expired and did not play again.

Durmisi announced his retirement on Instagram on 1 October 2026, at the age of 32, saying that his body could no longer continue.

== International career ==
Durmisi represented Denmark at every youth level from under-16 upwards, winning 55 youth caps before his first senior call-up.

Through his family's origins, Durmisi was eligible for Macedonia and Albania as well as Denmark. He said in December 2014 that he had been approached by the Football Federation of Macedonia but that Denmark was his preference, to which Denmark manager Morten Olsen responded that Durmisi should let his performances speak for him, while confirming that he was under consideration. In September 2015, he said that he would have been willing to play for Albania but had never been contacted by the FSHF, and that he had turned down the Macedonian approach.

Called up as a late replacement for the injured Nicolai Boilesen, Durmisi made his senior debut on 8 June 2015 in a 2–1 friendly win over Montenegro at Viborg Stadion, coming on for Simon Poulsen in the 72nd minute. He started all four of Denmark's internationals that autumn, beginning with a Euro 2016 qualifier against Albania, and Olsen's assistant Peter Bonde described him as the team's outstanding player over that run.

Durmisi retained his place under Åge Hareide, starting both of the new manager's first matches in charge, against Iceland and Scotland in March 2016, as a left wing-back in a 3–5–2 formation. He was named in Denmark's preliminary squad for the 2018 FIFA World Cup but was left out of the final 23. He won 23 caps without scoring, the last of them in 2018, and was called up again in 2019 without adding to the total.

== Career statistics ==
Appearances and goals by club, season and competition
Club	Season	League			National cup (Note: Includes Danish Cup, Coppa Italia, Coupe de France, Copa del Rey)		Continental		Other		Total	
Club	Season	Division	Apps	Goals	Apps	Goals	Apps	Goals	Apps	Goals	Apps	Goals
Brøndby	2012–13	Danish Superliga	4	0	0	0	—		—		4	0
Brøndby	2013–14	Danish Superliga	32	3	1	0	—		—		33	3
Brøndby	2014–15	Danish Superliga	28	3	0	0	2 (Note: Appearances in UEFA Europa League)	0	—		30	3
Brøndby	2015–16	Danish Superliga	29	1	4	0	7	0	—		40	1
Brøndby	Total		93	7	5	0	9	0	0	0	107	7
Betis	2016–17	La Liga	27	1	0	0	—		—		27	1
Betis	2017–18	La Liga	24	2	0	0	—		—		24	2
Betis	Total		51	3	0	0	0	0	0	0	51	3
Lazio	2018–19	Serie A	10	0	2	0	7	0	—		19	0
Nice (loan)	2019–20	Ligue 1	4	0	1	0	—		—		5	0
Salernitana (loan)	2020–21	Serie B	5	0	0	0	—		—		5	0
Sparta Rotterdam (loan)	2021–22	Eredivisie	9	0	0	0	—		—		9	0
Leganés (loan)	2022–23	Segunda División	10	0	1	0	—		—		11	0
Tenerife (loan)	2022–23	Segunda División	1	0	—		—		—		1	0
ŁKS Łódź	2023–24	Ekstraklasa	11	0	—		—		—		11	0
Nea Salamina	2024–25	Cypriot First Division	16	0	—		—		—		16	0
Amazonas	2025	Série B	4	0	—		—		—		4	0
Career total			214	10	9	0	16	0	0	0	239	10

== Honours ==
Lazio

- Coppa Italia: 2018–19

Individual

- Brøndby IF Player of the Year: 2015
