= José Ariel Núñez =

Paraguayan footballer (born 1988)

Personal information
- Full name: José Ariel Núñez Portelli
- Date of birth: 12 September 1988 (age 38)
- Place of birth: Asunción, Paraguay
- Height: 1.74 m (5 ft 9 in)
- Position: Striker

Team information
- Current team: 12 de Octubre
- Number: 8

Youth career
- Libertad

Senior career*
Years	Team	Apps	(Gls)
2006–2007	Libertad	19	(2)
2008	Presidente Hayes	0	(0)
2008–2009	Tacuary	60	(12)
2010–2014	Libertad	102	(33)
2013	→ Osasuna (loan)	6	(0)
2014–2017	Brøndby	27	(9)
2015–2016	→ Club Olimpia (loan)	32	(7)
2017–2018	Nacional	28	(2)
2018	Unión de Santa Fe	3	(0)
2019	Wilstermann	17	(4)
2020–2021	12 de Octubre	63	(15)
2022	Guaraní	5	(0)
2022–2023	Guaireña	36	(4)
2023–2024	Nacional	14	(0)
2024–2025	Tembetary	29	(3)
2025–	12 de Octubre	17	(8)

International career
2011–2013	Paraguay	11	(3)
- * Club domestic league appearances and goals as of 15 November 2025

José Ariel Núñez Portelli (born 12 September 1988) is a Paraguayan international footballer who plays as a forward for Primera División B Metropolitana club 12 de Octubre.

== Club career ==
Born in Asunción, Núñez spent his early career in his native Paraguay, playing for Libertad, Presidente Hayes and Tacuary.

In July 2013 he went on loan to Spanish club Osasuna.

On 31 January 2014 he signed a four-year contract with Danish side Brøndby. He made his debut for the club on 24 February 2014, appearing as a substitute for the final seven minutes of the game. He scored his first goal for the club on 30 March 2014, in the 1–0 away victory against Viborg. The goal was also the first goal by a Paraguayan player in the league.

Núñez ranked number 6 in a list of the most expensive players in Paraguayan football for 2015 published by Diario Extra.

After leaving Brøndby, he returned to Paraguay to play with Club Olimpia and Club Nacional, and in Argentina with Unión de Santa Fe. He signed for Wilstermann for the 2019 season.

== International career ==
He made his international debut for Paraguay in 2011.
