= Johan Larsson (footballer) =

Swedish footballer (born 1990)

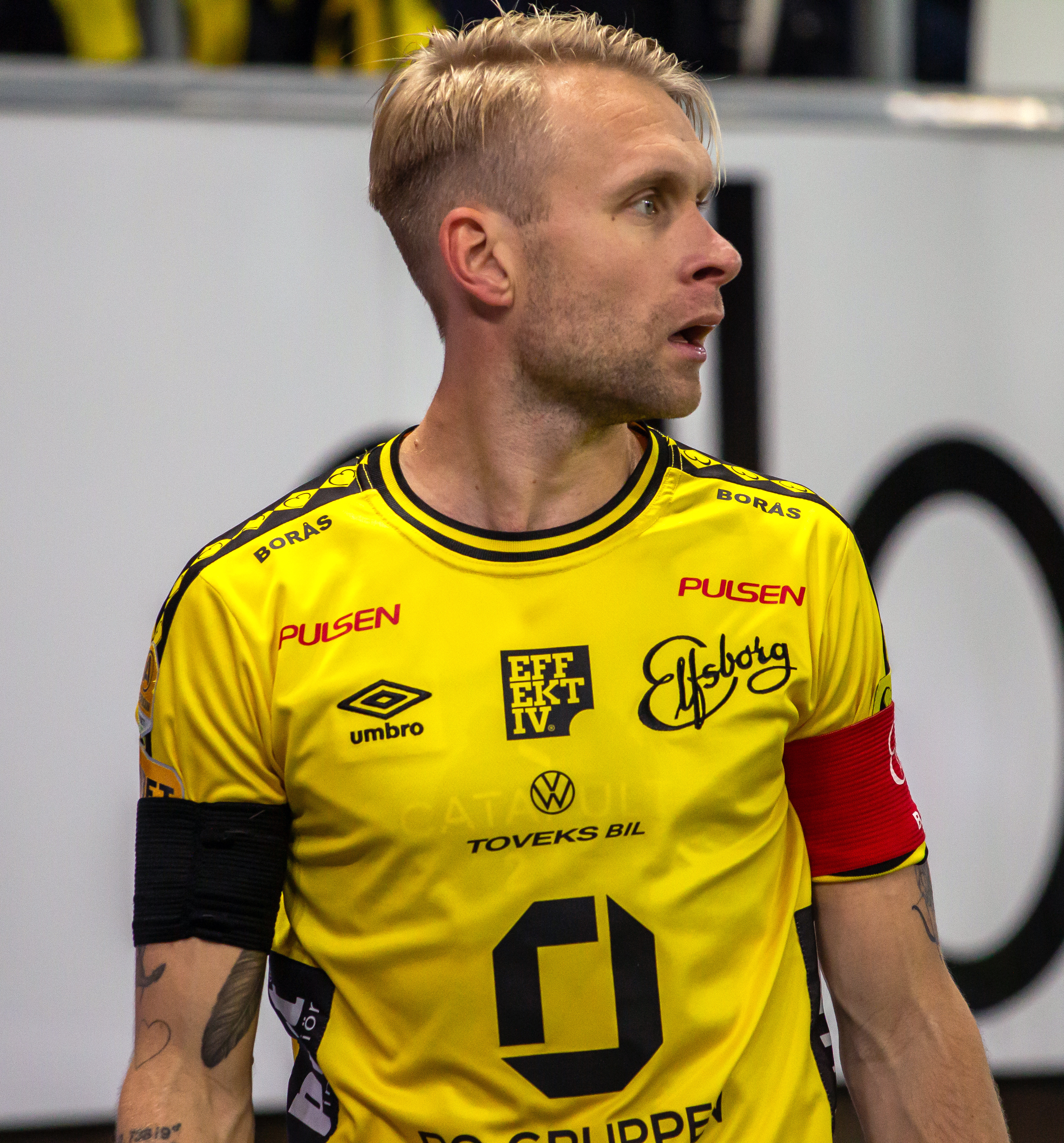
- Larsson with Elfsborg in 2023

Personal information
- Full name: Johan Erik Liebert Larsson
- Date of birth: 5 May 1990 (age 36)
- Place of birth: Kinna, Sweden
- Height: 1.82 m (6 ft 0 in)
- Position: Right-back

Youth career
- –2005: Kinna IF
- 2005–2009: IF Elfsborg

Senior career*
Years	Team	Apps	(Gls)
2010–2014	IF Elfsborg	149	(26)
2015–2018	Brøndby IF	137	(12)
2019	Guingamp B	1	(0)
2019	Guingamp	1	(0)
2019	Brøndby IF	9	(0)
2020–2025	IF Elfsborg	141	(15)
Total		438	(53)

International career
2010–2012	Sweden U21	11	(2)
2014–2018	Sweden	6	(0)
- * Club domestic league appearances and goals

Johan Erik Liebert Larsson (born 5 May 1990) is a Swedish former professional footballer who played as a right-back. Beginning his career with IF Elfsborg in 2010, he represented Brøndby IF and Guingamp between 2015 and 2019 before returning to IF Elfsborg in 2020. A full international between 2014 and 2018, he won six caps for the Sweden national team.

== Club career ==
=== Elfsborg ===
Larsson played for Kinna IF until 2005 when he left the club for IF Elfsborg. He played for the youth teams and also won the Swedish Championship for juniors.

He made his first team debut on 15 March 2010 in Elfsborg's 0–0 draw away against Gefle IF. He scored two goals in the next game at home to Halmstads BK. During the 2013 Allsvenskan season, Larsson made all appearances. On 27 February 2014, he extended his contract with Elfsborg until 2016.

=== Brøndby ===
On 2 February 2015, Larsson transferred to Danish club Brøndby IF on a four-year contract. He was given the shirt number 13. He permanently replaced the retiring Thomas Kahlenberg as club captain in the summer of 2017, after having captained the team for most of the 2016–17 season due to an injury to the latter. On 10 May 2018, he captained Brøndby as they beat Silkeborg IF 3–1 in the 2017–18 Danish Cup final.

=== Guingamp ===
On 23 December 2018, Larsson signed as a free agent for Ligue 1 side En Avant de Guingamp. His stay in France was not successful, playing only 1 league match and making 3 cup appearances for the Guingamp, as they ended the 2018–19 season in relegation to the Ligue 2. After relegation became a fact, Larsson was released from his contract by mutual consent on 24 June 2019.

=== Return to Brøndby ===
On 27 August 2019, Larsson signed a six-month contract with his former club Brøndby IF. He also stated that he did not regret his decision to join Guingamp half a year before. On 1 September, Larsson made his official comeback in 1–0 loss against FC Midtjylland. Despite the loss, he was praised for his promising return. His contract expired at the end of the year and was not extended. He made 10 appearances during his second stint in Brøndby.

=== Return to Elfsborg ===
On 26 February 2020, Larsson signed a two-year contract with IF Elfsborg, a little more than five years after leaving the club for the first time. On 14 June, he made his first appearance upon returning to Borås in a 0–1 away win over IFK Göteborg, where he played the entire match at right back. He scored his first goal in a home game against Falkenbergs FF on 13 August, as Elfsborg won 4–2.

== International career ==
In 2010, he was called up to the Swedish under-21 team and made his debut against Montenegro. On 17 January 2014, he made his debut for the senior team in a match against Moldova.

== Career statistics ==
=== International ===
Appearances and goals by national team and year
National team	Year	Apps	Goals
Sweden	2014	1	0
Sweden	2015	2	0
Sweden	2016	0	0
Sweden	2017	0	0
Sweden	2018	3	0
Total		6	0

== Honours ==
IF Elfsborg

- Allsvenskan: 2012
- Svenska Cupen: 2013–14

Brøndby

- Danish Cup: 2017–18

Individual

- Allsvenskan Defender of the Year: 2014
