= 2018–19 Odense Boldklub season =

Odense Boldklub
2018–19 season
- OB players celebrating a victory against Vejle in August 2018.
- Chairman: Niels Thorborg
- Manager: Jakob Michelsen
- Stadium: Nature Energy Park
- Danish Superliga: 5th
- Danish Cup: Semi-final
- Top goalscorer: League: Bashkim Kadrii (10 goals); All: Bashkim Kadrii (11 goals)
- Highest home attendance: 14,246 (vs. Brøndby)
- Lowest home attendance: 4,005 (vs. Hobro)
| Home colours | Away colours |

The 2018–19 Odense Boldklub season was the club's 130th season, and their 57th appearance in the Danish Superliga. As well as the Superliga, the side was also compete in Sydbank Pokalen.

At the end of the 2017–18 season, head coach Kent Nielsen got fired. Jakob Michelsen signed a 3-year contract on May 29 as new head coach.

OB finished as 3rd in the Superliga regular season despite starting with the worst opening six games in 19 years. OB finished strong in the last half of the season, among other things by winning five consecutive games, last time in 2009. OB had the chance to win the bronze medal, but could not keep going in the play-offs, and therefore it ended up with a 5th place. They finished off by losing to Brøndby in the last and deciding game of the season, and therefore OB also missed the 4th place and Europa League.

But beside to a disappointing conclusion, OB ended up with the best season in eight years by finishing in the top-6.

== Season review ==
=== The new OB ===
The 2018–19 season indicated a new start and reboot for the club. Beside from the two new coaches, the club got a new CEO in April. The new CEO, Enrico Augustinus, had ambitions right from the start, and he wanted to create a new OB and make the club great again. Therefore, Augustinus and the board started to focus on better communication and branding, which hopefully would result in more spectators, due to the low average attendance the last few seasons.

==== Sponsors ====
After 16 years as a main sponsor, Carlsberg was replaced by Albani. The new main sponsor is located in Odense as well, which makes the club more local. Furthermore, the stadium sponsor was changed too. NGF Nature Energy became new stadium sponsor, and the name was now Nature Energy Park.

==== Mascot ====
OB retired their mascot, the tiger Victor, who has been the mascot for over a decade. Instead they brought in an almost identical mascot, a cat, who was the OB mascot in the 90's. At the same time, the old intro song "Eye of the Tiger" was switched out for Carl Nielsen's "Espansiva".

=== Pre-season ===
The OB pre-season were kicked off with the signings of academy players Jonathan Harboe and Mads Frøkjær-Jensen. They later on signed Horsens player Alexander Ludwig and academy player Mathias Jørgensen.

OB went on playing five pre-season games by winning them all. They played against Taarup/Paarup, Östersund, Kalmar, Roskilde, and Hvidovre. This was considered a good start for the new head coach Jakob Michelsen, but people were still doubting whether the team would do well in the Superliga because the sporting director, Jesper Hansen, did not acquire any new high profile players. Although he had promised a minimum of three new signings in the summer transfer window, he could not promise that it would be done before the first Superliga match.

=== July ===
OB's opening Superliga fixture was away against promoted side Vendsyssel on 15 July. OB looked solid, but fell apart in the second half with two quick goals by Vendsyssel. Even though OB scored twice, the Stripes could not hold off Vendsyssel from winning 3–2. 17-year old Mathias Jørgensen came in as a sub and scored his first ever Superliga goal.

After the disappointing loss, OB acquired Janus Drachmann from FC Midtjylland on a four-year deal. They also sold André Rømer to Randers.

With the reinforcement they went on playing their home opener against head coach Michelsen's former team SønderjyskE. OB were down 0–2 at half time, but a few substitutions turn things upside down. Jørgensen only needed 13 minutes on the pitch before he could score his second goal in the season, again as a sub, and brought OB on 1–2. Anders K. Jacobsen equalized at the 78 minute-mark. The game ended 2–2 even though OB had the chances for a win.

OB hoped to bring the good play from the SønderjyskE-game into the next game away against Randers. They played well, but it did not bring them the first win of the season. It was Rømer who scored the crucial goal after just 39 seconds, after OB just sold him Randers. After the loss, people started to doubt if Michelsen was the right to take over the head coach position after just one point in three games against Vendsyssel, SønderjyskE and Randers.

=== August ===
OB went on playing a tough game against F.C. Copenhagen in the fourth round at home. It looked like they did not stand a chance after the first three-game, but OB did quite well. They had their chances to get in front and also could have got a penalty or two. With many missed chances and some bad luck, Dame N'Doye instead scored the deciding goal in favour of Copenhagen in the 85th minute. OB were now sitting in 13th place.

It was now everything or nothing when OB faced Hobro away in the fifth round. A battle between number 13 and 14, and therefore a battle of not sitting in last place. OB was anything else than lucky, and within 35 minutes they were down with 0–3. In the rainy conditions OB had a hard time creating chances, but they got a few in the closing minutes. Rasmus Festersen missed a penalty, and that was just the symbol of the OB's game. Helenius and Festersen made it 2–3, but could not get the equalizer. OB were now sitting in last place. The worst start to a season in 19 years.

Meanwhile Sten Grytebust was rumored away, OB acquired Ivorian goalkeeper Sayouba Mandé. According to a lot of medias, Mandé were brought in to replace Grytebust. Therefore, everybody a sale of the Norwegian keeper.

OB were now facing defending Superliga champion FC Midtjylland at home. Not exactly an easy job against the league's current number 3, who got three consecutive wins. But against Copenhagen, OB showed that they could play against even the best teams. And that theory was proved correct as OB were the dominating team in the match. The only problem was still getting the opening goal. And after 74 minutes Marc Dal Hende banged Midtjylland in front, and OB were now facing another questionable defeat. But three minutes into stoppage time Nicklas Helenius equalized and got OB their second point of the season. A very deserved point that should have been three points, according to several medias.

== First team ==
Last updated on 20 March 2019

| Squad no. | Name | Nationality | Position | Date of birth (age) |
Goalkeepers
| 13 | Sten Grytebust | (Norway) | GK | 25 October 1989 (aged 29) |
| 27 | Oliver Christensen | (Denmark) | GK | 22 March 1999 (aged 20) |
| 30 | Sayouba Mandé | (Ivory Coast) | GK | 15 June 1993 (aged 25) |
Defenders
| 2 | Oliver Lund | (Denmark) | RB/CB | 21 August 1990 (aged 28) |
| 3 | Alexander Ludwig | (Denmark) | CB | 30 June 1993 (aged 25) |
| 4 | Ryan Johnson Laursen | (Denmark) | RB | 14 April 1992 (aged 27) |
| 5 | Ramon Leeuwin | (Netherlands) | CB | 1 September 1987 (aged 31) |
| 6 | Jeppe Tverskov (vice-captain) | (Denmark) | CB | 12 March 1993 (aged 26) |
| 20 | Jacob Barrett Laursen | (Denmark) | LB | 17 November 1994 (aged 24) |
| 24 | Marco Lund | (Denmark) | CB | 30 June 1996 (aged 22) |
Midfielders
| 8 | Janus Drachmann (captain) | (Denmark) | CM | 11 May 1988 (aged 31) |
| 11 | Casper Nielsen | (Denmark) | CM/RM | 29 April 1994 (aged 25) |
| 14 | Jens Jakob Thomasen | (Denmark) | CM/AM | 25 May 1996 (aged 23) |
| 16 | Julius Eskesen | (Denmark) | CM/RM | 16 March 1999 (aged 20) |
| 17 | Jonathan Harboe | (Denmark) | CM | 24 May 2000 (aged 19) |
| 21 | Mathias Greve | (Denmark) | RM/LM | 11 February 1995 (aged 24) |
| 23 | Troels Kløve | (Denmark) | LM | 23 October 1990 (aged 28) |
| 26 | Yao Dieudonne | (Ivory Coast) | LM/RM/ST | 14 February 1997 (aged 22) |
| 29 | Mads Frøkjær-Jensen | (Denmark) | LM/CM | 29 July 1999 (aged 19) |
Forwards
| 9 | Bashkim Kadrii | (Denmark) | ST/LW | 9 July 1991 (aged 27) |
| 10 | Rasmus Festersen | (Denmark) | ST | 26 August 1986 (aged 32) |
| 15 | Nicklas Helenius | (Denmark) | ST | 8 May 1991 (aged 28) |
| 28 | Anders K. Jacobsen | (Denmark) | ST | 27 October 1989 (aged 29) |

== Transfers and loans ==
=== Transfers in ===
| Entry date | Position | No. | Player | From club | Fee | Ref. |
|---|---|---|---|---|---|---|
| 1 July 2018 | MF | 29 | (Denmark) Mads Frøkjær-Jensen | Youth academy | None | |
| 1 July 2018 | MF | 17 | (Denmark) Jonathan Harboe | Youth academy | None | |
| 1 July 2018 | DF | 5 | (Denmark) Alexander Ludwig | (Denmark) Horsens | | |
| 1 July 2018 | FW | 25 | (Denmark) Mathias Jørgensen | Youth academy | None | |
| 18 July 2018 | MF | 8 | (Denmark) Janus Drachmann | (Denmark) Midtjylland | 2,600,000 DKK | |
| 16 August 2018 | GK | 30 | (Ivory Coast) Sayouba Mandé | (Norway) Stabæk Fotball | | |
| 22 August 2018 | DF | 5 | (Netherlands) Ramon Leeuwin | (Netherlands) Utrecht | 1,850,000 DKK | |
| 23 August 2018 | MF | 7 | (Czech Republic) Kamil Vacek | (Poland) Śląsk Wrocław | Free transfer | |
| 31 August 2018 | FW | 9 | (Denmark) Bashkim Kadrii | (Denmark) Copenhagen | 1,000,000 DKK | |
| 1 January 2019 | GK | 1 | (Denmark) Thomas Mikkelsen | (Denmark) Lyngby | Back from loan | |
| 25 January 2019 | DF | 2 | (Denmark) Oliver Lund | (Denmark) Lyngby | | |
| Total | | | | | 5,450,000 DKK | |

=== Transfers out ===
| Departure date | Position | No. | Player | To club | Fee | Ref. |
|---|---|---|---|---|---|---|
| 30 June 2018 | DF | 17 | (Denmark) Jacob Buus | (Denmark) Fredericia | End of contract | |
| 30 June 2018 | FW | 7 | (Denmark) Jóan Símun Edmundsson | (Germany) Arminia Bielefeld | End of contract | |
| 30 June 2018 | FW | 9 | (Sweden) Rasmus Jönsson | (Sweden) Helsingborg | End of contract | |
| 30 June 2018 | DF | 5 | (Portugal) João Pereira | (Denmark) SønderjyskE | End of contract | |
| 30 June 2018 | MF | 21 | (Denmark) Mathias Thrane | None | End of contract | |
| 30 June 2018 | MF | 22 | (Ghana) Nana Welbeck | (Bosnia and Herzegovina) Mladost Doboj Kakanj | End of contract | |
| 19 July 2018 | MF | 8 | (Denmark) André Rømer | (Denmark) Randers | | |
| 31 August 2018 | GK | 1 | (Denmark) Thomas Mikkelsen | (Denmark) Lyngby | Loan | |
| 31 December 2018 | DF | 2 | (Denmark) Kenneth Emil Petersen | | Retired | |
| 8 January 2019 | GK | 1 | (Denmark) Thomas Mikkelsen | (Denmark) Lyngby | | |
| 31 August 2018 | MF | 7 | (Czech Republic) Kamil Vacek | (Czech Republic) Bohemians 1905 | Loan | |
| 12 February 2019 | FW | 25 | (Denmark) Mathias Jørgensen | (United States) New York Red Bulls | 15,000,000 DKK | |
| 20 March 2019 | MF | 19 | (Denmark) Mikkel Desler | (Norway) Haugesund | | |
| Total | | | | | 15,000,000 DKK | |

=== Transfer summary ===
Spending

Summer: ▼5,450,000 DKK

Winter: 0,000,000 DKK

Total: ▼5,450,000 DKK

Income

Summer: 0,000,000 DKK

Winter: ▲15,000,000 DKK

Total: ▲15,000,000 DKK

Net Expenditure

Summer: ▼5,450,000 DKK

Winter: ▲15,000,000 DKK

Total: ▲9,550,000 DKK

=== New contracts ===
| Date | Pos | No. | Player | Ref. |
|---|---|---|---|---|
| 9 July 2018 | DF | 6 | (Denmark) Jeppe Tverskov | |
| 25 September 2018 | DF | 20 | (Denmark) Jacob Barrett Laursen | |
| 15 May 2019 | DF | 4 | (Denmark) Ryan Johnson Laursen | |
| 15 May 2019 | DF | 2 | (Denmark) Oliver Lund | |

== Friendlies ==
=== Pre-season ===
| 23 June 2018 Friendly | Tarup/Paarup (Denmark) | 0–3 | (Denmark) Odense | Odense, Denmark |
| 14:00 CEST | | Report | Festersen 11'; Dieudonne 12'; Jørgensen 78' | Stadium: home Park |

| 27 June 2018 Friendly | Odense (Denmark) | 2–0 | (Sweden) Östersund | Odense, Denmark |
| 18:00 CEST | Desler 26'; Jørgensen 81' | Report | | Stadium: Nature Energy Park |

| 30 June 2018 Friendly | Odense (Denmark) | 2–0 | (Sweden) Kalmar | Odense, Denmark |
| 13:00 CEST | Laursen 38'; Festersen 45' | Report | | Stadium: Nature Energy Park |

| 6 July 2018 Friendly | Odense (Denmark) | 4–2 | (Denmark) Roskilde | Odense, Denmark |
| 13:00 CEST | Laursen 41', 90'; Festersen 43'; Tverskov 55' | Report | Nøhr 22', 78' | Stadium: Nature Energy Park |

| 9 July 2018 Friendly | Odense (Denmark) | 3–0 | (Denmark) Hvidovre | Odense, Denmark |
| 13:00 CEST | Jørgensen 22'; Helenius 71' (pen.); Thomasen 74' | Report | | Stadium: Nature Energy Park |

=== Winter ===
| 24 January 2019 Friendly | Odense (Denmark) | 1–0 | (Poland) Pogoń Szczecin | Belek, Turkey |
| 09:00 CEST | Nielsen 52' | Report | | Stadium: Cornelia Sports Center |

| 28 January 2019 Friendly | Odense (Denmark) | 2–0 | (Poland) Lechia Gdańsk | Belek, Turkey |
| 15:00 CEST | Kadrii 40', 69' | Report | | Stadium: Cornelia Sports Center |

| 29 January 2019 Friendly | Rapid Wien (Austria) | 2–5 | (Denmark) Odense | Belek, Turkey |
| 14:00 CEST | Knasmüllner 33'; Schwab 52' | Report | Nielsen 8', 19'; Desler 17'; Festersen 32'; Tverskov 60' | Stadium: Cornelia Sports Center |

| 2 February 2019 Friendly | Odense (Denmark) | 2–2 | (Sweden) Helsingborg | Odense, Denmark |
| 15:00 CEST | Kløve 5'; Randrup 52' (o.g.) | Report | Jönsson 9', 29' | Stadium: Nature Energy Park |

== Competitions ==
=== Superliga ===
==== League table ====
| Pos | Team | Pld | W | D | L | GF | GA | GD | Pts | Qualification |
|---|---|---|---|---|---|---|---|---|---|---|
| 1 | Copenhagen | 26 | 19 | 4 | 3 | 65 | 23 | +42 | 61 | Qualification for the Championship round |
| 2 | Midtjylland | 26 | 18 | 6 | 2 | 62 | 26 | +36 | 60 | Qualification for the Championship round |
| 3 | OB | 26 | 12 | 6 | 8 | 35 | 31 | +4 | 42 | Qualification for the Championship round |
| 4 | Brøndby | 26 | 11 | 5 | 10 | 44 | 40 | +4 | 38 | Qualification for the Championship round |
| 5 | Esbjerg | 26 | 11 | 5 | 10 | 32 | 35 | −3 | 38 | Qualification for the Championship round |

Source: Danish Football Association (in Danish), Soccerway
Rules for classification: 1) Points; 2) Goal difference; 3) Goals scored; 4) Away goals scored; 5) Play-off (played on neutral ground if determining teams for different rounds); 6) Draw.

==== Results summary ====
| Overall | | | | | | | | Home | | | | | | Away | | | | | |
| Pld | W | D | L | GF | GA | GD | Pts | W | D | L | GF | GA | GD | W | D | L | GF | GA | GD |
|---|---|---|---|---|---|---|---|---|---|---|---|---|---|---|---|---|---|---|---|
| 26 | 12 | 6 | 8 | 35 | 31 | +4 | 42 | 7 | 4 | 2 | 19 | 9 | +10 | 5 | 2 | 6 | 16 | 22 | −6 |

Last updated: 17 March 2019.

==== Results by round ====
| Matchday | 1 | 2 | 3 | 4 | 5 | 6 | 7 | 8 | 9 | 10 | 11 | 12 | 13 | 14 | 15 | 16 | 17 | 18 | 19 | 20 | 21 | 22 | 23 | 24 | 25 | 26 |
|---|---|---|---|---|---|---|---|---|---|---|---|---|---|---|---|---|---|---|---|---|---|---|---|---|---|---|
| Ground | A | H | A | H | A | H | A | H | A | H | A | H | A | A | H | H | A | H | A | H | A | H | A | H | A | H |
| Result | L | D | L | L | L | D | W | D | L | W | W | D | D | D | W | W | W | W | L | L | L | W | W | W | W | W |
| Position | 10 | 9 | 12 | 13 | 14 | 14 | 13 | 13 | 13 | 12 | 10 | 11 | 11 | 10 | 7 | 4 | 4 | 3 | 4 | 7 | 9 | 8 | 4 | 3 | 3 | 3 |

Updated to match(es) played on 17 March 2019. Source: Soccerway
A = Away; H = Home; W = Win; D = Draw; L = Loss

==== Matches ====
| 15 July 2018 1 | Vendsyssel | 3–2 | Odense | Hjørring |
| 14:00 CEST | Knudsen (yellow card) 29'; Czajkowski 52'; Hjorth 60'; Jensen (yellow card) 78'; Svenningsen (red card) 79'; Opondo 83' | Report | Nielsen (yellow card) 35'; Barrett (yellow card) 66'; Helenius 80' (pen.); Jørgensen 87'; Petersen (yellow card) 90+4' | Stadium: Nord Energi Arena; Attendance: 3,084; Referee: Morten Krogh |

| 22 July 2018 2 | Odense | 2–2 | SønderjyskE | Odense |
| 14:00 CEST | Petersen (yellow card) 45'; Jørgensen 58'; Jacobsen 78' | Report | Jónsson (yellow card) 24'; Luijckx 24'; Jakobsen 43'; Zimling (yellow card) 70' | Stadium: Nature Energy Park; Attendance: 5,738; Referee: Jakob Kehlet |

| 29 July 2018 3 | Randers | 1–0 | Odense | Randers |
| 14:00 CEST | Rømer 1'; Allansson (yellow card) 43'; Bager (yellow card) 72' | Report | | Stadium: BioNutria Park Randers; Attendance: 3,333; Referee: Jens Grabski Maae |

| 5 August 2018 4 | Odense | 0–1 | Copenhagen | Odense |
| 14:00 CEST | Drachmann (yellow card) 82' | Report | Fischer (yellow card) 57'; Falk (yellow card) 58'; N'Doye 85' | Stadium: Nature Energy Park; Attendance: 9,389; Referee: Jens Grabski Maae |

| 11 August 2018 5 | Hobro | 3–2 | Odense | Hobro |
| 16:00 CEST | Sabbi 25', 28', (yellow card) 71'; Ludwig 35' (o.g.); Rask (yellow card) 49'; Gotfredsen (yellow card) 50'; Grønning (yellow card) 79' | Report | Helenius 75'; Festersen (yellow card) 86', (goal) 90+3' | Stadium: DS Arena; Attendance: 1,623; Referee: Mikkel Redder |

| 19 August 2018 6 | Odense | 1–1 | Midtjylland | Odense |
| 20:00 CEST | Helenius 90+3' | Report | Duelund (yellow card) 13'; Dal Hende 74' | Stadium: Nature Energy Park; Attendance: 4,646; Referee: Anders Poulsen |

| 26 August 2018 7 | Vejle | 0–2 | Odense | Vejle |
| 14:00 CEST | Sousa (yellow card) 42' | Report | Laursen 35'; Tverskov 45+1' | Stadium: Vejle Stadion; Attendance: 6,362; Referee: Michael Johansen |

| 2 September 2018 8 | Odense | 0–0 | Nordsjælland | Odense |
| 12:00 CEST | Ludwig (yellow card) 36' | Report | Bartolec (yellow card) 38'; Mumin (yellow card) 76' | Stadium: Nature Energy Park; Attendance: 5,364; Referee: Peter Munch Larsen |

| 14 September 2018 9 | Esbjerg | 2–0 | Odense | Esbjerg |
| 19:00 CEST | Brink (yellow card) 15'; Sørensen 41'; Brinch (yellow card) 43'; Agus (yellow card) 45'; Kadrii 52'; Yakovenko (yellow card) 54' | Report | | Stadium: Blue Water Arena; Attendance: 4,425; Referee: Mikkel Redder |

| 24 September 2018 10 | Odense | 4–0 | Horsens | Odense |
| 19:00 CEST | Kadrii 11'; Leeuwin (yellow card) 52'; Drachmann (yellow card) 71'; Thomasen 84'; Helenius 88'; Barrett 90+1' | Report | | Stadium: Nature Energy Park; Attendance: 4,365; Referee: Sandi Putros |

| 30 September 2018 11 | Aalborg | 0–1 | Odense | Aalborg |
| 16:00 CEST | Børsting (yellow card) 73'; Ahlmann (yellow card) 89' | Report | Nielsen 18' | Stadium: Aalborg Portland Park; Attendance: 5,739; Referee: Peter Kjærsgaard |

| 6 October 2018 12 | Odense | 2–2 | Aarhus | Odense |
| 16:00 CEST | Barrett 37'; Kadrii (yellow card) 69'; Laursen (yellow card) 73'; Leeuwin (yellow card) 76'; Helenius (yellow card) 80', (goal) 87' (pen.) | Report | Ankersen 13'; Sana 22'; Juelsgård (yellow card) 43'; Guira (yellow card) 69'; Mikanović (yellow card) 87'; Mmaee (yellow card) 90' | Stadium: Nature Energy Park; Attendance: 9,530; Referee: Jens Grabski Maae |

| 22 October 2018 13 | Brøndby | 1–1 | Odense | Brøndby |
| 19:00 CEST | Vigen (yellow card) 71'; Mukhtar 82' | Report | Kadrii (yellow card) 22'; Tverskov (yellow card) 35'; Greve (yellow card) 49'; Christensen (yellow card) 63'; Leeuwin 84' | Stadium: Brøndby Stadium; Attendance: 12,185; Referee: Michael Tykgaard |

| 26 October 2018 14 | SønderjyskE | 0–0 | Odense | Haderslev |
| 19:00 CEST | Rømer (yellow card) 45'; Poulsen (yellow card) 59' | Report | Leeuwin (yellow card) 25'; Ludwig (yellow card) 41'; Tverskov (yellow card) 81'; Desler (yellow card) 85' | Stadium: Sydbank Park; Attendance: 4,024; Referee: Mikkel Redder |

| 2 November 2018 15 | Odense | 1–0 | Hobro | Odense |
| 18:00 CEST | Drachmann 10'; Desler (yellow card) 18'; Nielsen (yellow card) 87' | Report | Grønning (yellow card) 85' | Stadium: Nature Energy Park; Attendance: 4,005; Referee: Mads-Kristoffer Kristoffersen |

| 11 November 2018 16 | Odense | 2–1 | Esbjerg | Odense |
| 20:00 CEST | Lund 38'; Nielsen (yellow card) 87', (goal) 90+3'; Barrett (yellow card) 90' | Report | Austin 7'; Petre (yellow card) 27'; Yakovenko (yellow card) 83' | Stadium: Nature Energy Park; Attendance: 4,127; Referee: Mads-Kristoffer Kristoffersen |

| 25 November 2018 17 | Nordsjælland | 1–3 | Odense | Farum |
| 14:00 CEST | Skov Olsen 3'; Damsgaard (yellow card) 18' | Report | Thomasen 24'; Helenius 48'; Kadrii 59' | Stadium: Right to Dream Park; Attendance: 2,144; Referee: Benjamin Willaume-Jantzen |

| 1 December 2018 18 | Odense | 2–0 | Vendsyssel | Odense |
| 16:00 CEST | Kadrii 18', 67'; Eskesen (yellow card) 60' | Report | Henriksen (yellow card) 44' | Stadium: Nature Energy Park; Attendance: 4,346; Referee: Sandi Putros |

| 7 December 2018 19 | Midtjylland | 3–0 | Odense | Herning |
| 19:00 CEST | Scholz 23'; Poulsen 38' (pen.); Nicolaisen (yellow card) 51' (yellow-red card) 90'; George (yellow card) 58'; Dal Hende (yellow card) 59'; Andersson 89' | Report | Lund (yellow card) 37'; Laursen (yellow card) 39'; Grytebust (yellow card) 59' | Stadium: MCH Arena; Attendance: 7,034; Referee: Jørgen Daugbjerg Burchardt |

| 14 December 2018 20 | Odense | 1–2 | Aalborg | Odense |
| 19:00 CEST | Helenius 45' (pen.); Kløve (yellow card) 59' | Report | Ochs (yellow card) 21'; Ross (yellow card) 32'; Rinne (yellow card) 44'; Abildgaard (yellow card) 45+3'; Kusk 57'; Pedersen 80'; Christensen (yellow card) 82' | Stadium: Nature Energy Park; Attendance: 4,404; Referee: Michael Johansen |

| 10 February 2019 21 | Copenhagen | 6–1 | Odense | Copenhagen |
| 18:00 CEST | Thomsen 22'; Ankersen 30'; Skov 45', 78', 90+3' (pen.); Zeca 52'; Boilesen (yellow card) 59'; Vavro (yellow card) 65' | Report | Drachmann (yellow card) 44'; Laursen 60'; Leeuwin (yellow card) 77'; Lund (yellow card) 90+2' | Stadium: Telia Parken; Referee: Mads-Kristoffer Kristoffersen |

| 17 February 2019 22 | Odense | 1–0 | Vejle | Odense |
| 14:00 CEST | Barrett 42'; Thomasen (yellow card) 49'; Tverskov (yellow card) 56'; Leeuwin (yellow card) 90+4' | Report | Schoop (yellow card) 60' | Stadium: Nature Energy Park; Attendance: 5,907; Referee: Peter Munch Larsen |

| 24 February 2019 23 | Horsens | 1–2 | Odense | Horsens |
| 14:00 CEST | Nymann 18'; Hansson (yellow card) 49' (yellow-red card) 56'; Drost (yellow card) 73' | Report | Kadrii 26'; Barrett (yellow card) 59'; Jacobsen 81' | Stadium: CASA Arena Horsens; Attendance: 3,162; Referee: Michael Tykgaard |

| 3 March 2019 24 | Odense | 2–0 | Brøndby | Odense |
| 18:00 CEST | Kadrii 26'; Barrett 67'; Tverskov (yellow card) 80' | Report | Radošević (yellow card) 34'; Halimi (yellow card) 69' | Stadium: Nature Energy Park; Attendance: 11,166; Referee: Mads-Kristoffer Kristoffersen |

| 11 March 2019 25 | Aarhus | 1–2 | Odense | Aarhus |
| 19:00 CEST | Lunding 48'; Thøgersen (yellow card) 73'; Stage (yellow card) 90' | Report | Leeuwin (yellow card) 52'; Kadrii 68'; Kløve 79', (yellow card) 90+2' | Stadium: Ceres Park; Attendance: 7,958; Referee: Sandi Putros |

| 17 March 2019 26 | Odense | 1–0 | Randers | Odense |
| 17:00 CEST | Barrett 43'; Eskesen (yellow card) 88' | Report | Poulsen (yellow card) 41' | Stadium: Nature Energy Park; Attendance: 6,366; Referee: Jørgen Daugbjerg Burchardt |

==== Championship round ====
| Pos | Team | Pld | W | D | L | GF | GA | GD | Pts | Qualification | COP | MID | ESB | BRO | ODE | NOR |
|---|---|---|---|---|---|---|---|---|---|---|---|---|---|---|---|---|
| 1 | Copenhagen (C) | 36 | 26 | 4 | 6 | 86 | 37 | +49 | 82 | Qualification for the Champions League second qualifying round | — | 3–0 | 1–0 | 3–2 | 4–0 | 1–3 |
| 2 | Midtjylland | 36 | 21 | 8 | 7 | 76 | 43 | +33 | 71 | Qualification for the Europa League third qualifying round | 4–0 | — | 1–2 | 1–2 | 2–0 | 0–0 |
| 3 | Esbjerg | 36 | 16 | 8 | 12 | 45 | 47 | −2 | 56 | Qualification for the Europa League second qualifying round | 4–3 | 2–2 | — | 1–0 | 0–0 | 0–0 |
| 4 | Brøndby (O) | 36 | 15 | 7 | 14 | 60 | 52 | +8 | 52 | Qualification for the European play-off match | 1–2 | 4–1 | 0–1 | — | 2–2 | 2–0 |
| 5 | Odense | 36 | 14 | 10 | 12 | 48 | 48 | 0 | 52 | | 0–1 | 3–1 | 4–1 | 0–2 | — | 2–2 |
| 6 | Nordsjælland | 36 | 10 | 14 | 12 | 52 | 54 | −2 | 44 | | 0–3 | 1–2 | 1–2 | 1–1 | 2–2 | — |

Source: Soccerway
Legend: Blue = home team win; Yellow = draw; Red = away team win.
(C) Champions; (O) Play-off winners

| 29 March 2019 27 | Brøndby | 2–2 | Odense | Copenhagen |
| 19:00 CEST | Hedlund 42'; Mukhtar (yellow card) 71'; Tibbling 73' | Report | Kløve 45+1'; Kadrii 58' | Stadium: Brøndby Stadium; Attendance: 11,679; Referee: Anders Poulsen |

| 7 April 2019 28 | Odense | 0–1 | Copenhagen | Odense |
| 18:00 CEST | O. Lund (yellow card) 25'; Leeuwin (yellow card) 49'; Kadrii (yellow card) 66' | Report | Zeca (yellow card) 34'; N'Doye 77'; Bjelland (yellow card) 90' | Stadium: Nature Energy Park; Attendance: 11,154; Referee: Jakob Kehlet |

| 14 April 2019 29 | Midtjylland | 2–0 | Odense | Herning |
| 18:00 CEST | Poulsen 28' (pen.); Onyeka 54' | Report | Tverskov (yellow card) 27' | Stadium: MCH Arena; Attendance: 8,035; Referee: Jens Grabski Maae |

| 19 April 2019 30 | Odense | 2–2 | Nordsjælland | Odense |
| 18:00 CEST | Festersen 89'; Kadrii 90+6' (pen.) | Report | Damsgaard 55'; Valentin (yellow card) 62'; Nelsson (yellow card) 75'; Skov Olsen 87', (yellow card) 87' | Stadium: Nature Energy Park; Attendance: 6,093; Referee: Michael Johansen |

| 23 April 2019 31 | Esbjerg | 0–0 | Odense | Esbjerg |
| 19:00 CEST | Austin (yellow card) 16'; Parunashvili (yellow card) 35'; Oti (yellow card) 83' | Report | | Stadium: Blue Water Arena; Attendance: 5,601; Referee: Mikkel Redder |

| 28 April 2019 32 | Copenhagen | 4–0 | Odense | Copenhagen |
| 18:00 CEST | N'Doye 29', 58'; Skov 55'; Thomsen 89' | Report | Grytebust (yellow card) 58' | Stadium: Telia Parken; Attendance: 15,230; Referee: Jens Grabski Maae |

| 5 May 2019 33 | Odense | 3–1 | Midtjylland | Odense |
| 18:00 CEST | Ludwig 40'; Thomasen 47'; Drachmann (yellow card) 57'; M. Lund (yellow card) 63'; Nielsen 63' | Report | Dal Hende 62' | Stadium: Nature Energy Park; Attendance: 5,119; Referee: Morten Krogh |

| 10 May 2019 34 | Odense | 4–1 | Esbjerg | Odense |
| 19:00 CEST | O. Lund 16', (yellow card) 64'; M. Lund (yellow card) 36'; Kløve 45', 88'; Leeuwin 60'; Frøkjær (yellow card) 90' | Report | Petre (yellow card) 49'; Yakovenko 71' | Stadium: Nature Energy Park; Attendance: 8,724; Referee: Benjamin Willaume-Jantzen |

| 19 May 2019 35 | Nordsjælland | 2–2 | Odense | Farum |
| 12:00 CEST | Amon 44'; Bartolec (yellow card) 52'; Rygaard 53'; Sadiq (yellow card) 64'; Nelsson (yellow card) 89' | Report | Lund 6'; Kadrii 17' | Stadium: Right to Dream Park; Attendance: 4,365; Referee: Anders Poulsen |

| 25 May 2019 36 | Odense | 0–2 | Brøndby | Odense |
| 17:00 CEST | M. Lund (yellow card) 49'; Drachmann (yellow card) 81'; Kadrii (yellow card) 90+4' | Report | Mensah (yellow card) 31'; Wilczek 38', (yellow card) 79'; Jung (yellow card) 59'; Uhre 73'; Schwäbe (yellow card) 79'; Hedlund (red card) 81' | Stadium: Nature Energy Park; Attendance: 14,246; Referee: Mads-Kristoffer Kristoffersen |

=== Sydbank Pokalen ===
| 6 September 2018 Second round | AB | 0–4 | Odense | Gladsaxe |
| 19:30 CEST | | Report | Kadrii 21'; Laursen 27'; Helenius 39', 60'; Dieudonne (yellow card) 66' | Stadium: Gladsaxe Stadion; Attendance: 1,210; Referee: Peter Kjærsgaard-Andersen |

| 3 October 2018 Third round | Thisted | 0–2 | Odense | Thisted |
| 19:30 CEST | | Report | Jacobsen 52'; Jørgensen 61' | Stadium: Sparekassen Thy Arena; Attendance: 649; Referee: Michael Tykgaard |

| 6 November 2018 Fourth round | Hobro | 2–4 | Odense | Hobro |
| 17:30 CEST | Grønning 47'; Kirkevold 55' | Report | Nielsen 12', 48', (yellow card) 82'; Thomasen 51'; Jacobsen 74' | Stadium: DS Arena; Attendance: 1,017; Referee: Jens Grabski Maae |

| 27 February 2019 Quarter-final | Odense | 2–2 (a.e.t.) (3−2 p) | Esbjerg | Odense |
| 19:00 CEST | Jacobsen 66'; Helenius 108' | Report | Petre 14'; Kauko 103' | Stadium: Nature Energy Park; Attendance: 4,310; Referee: Jakob Kehlet |
| | Penalties |
| | Thomasen (penalty missed); Jacobsen (penalty scored); Helenius (penalty missed); Nielsen (penalty scored); Kløve (penalty scored) | | (penalty scored) Mortensen; (penalty missed) Parunashvili; (penalty scored) Anyembe; (penalty missed) Yakovenko; (penalty missed) Lauridsen |

| 3 April 2019 Semi-final | Midtjylland | 4–0 | Odense | Herning |
| 19:30 CEST | Kløve 31' (o.g.); Onuachu 47', 72'; Wikheim 87' | Report | O. Lund (yellow card) 29' | Stadium: MCH Arena; Referee: Michael Johansen |

== Squad statistics ==
=== Goalscorers ===
Includes all competitive matches. The list is sorted by shirt number when total goals are equal.

As of match played 19 May 2019

| Rank | Pos. | No. | Player | Superliga | Sydbank Pokalen | Total |
|---|---|---|---|---|---|---|
| 1 | FW | 9 | Bashkim Kadrii | 10 | 1 | 11 |
| 2 | FW | 15 | Nicklas Helenius | 7 | 3 | 10 |
| 3 | MF | 11 | Casper Nielsen | 3 | 2 | 5 |
| 3 | DF | 20 | Jacob Barrett Laursen | 5 | 0 | 5 |
| 3 | FW | 28 | Anders K. Jacobsen | 2 | 3 | 5 |
| 6 | MF | 14 | Jens Jakob Thomasen | 3 | 1 | 4 |
| 6 | MF | 23 | Troels Kløve | 4 | 0 | 4 |
| 8 | DF | 4 | Ryan Johnson Laursen | 2 | 1 | 3 |
| 8 | FW | — | Mathias Jørgensen | 2 | 1 | 3 |
| 10 | DF | 2 | Oliver Lund | 2 | 0 | 2 |
| 10 | DF | 5 | Ramon Leeuwin | 2 | 0 | 2 |
| 10 | FW | 10 | Rasmus Festersen | 2 | 0 | 2 |
| 13 | DF | 3 | Alexander Ludwig | 1 | 0 | 1 |
| 13 | DF | 6 | Jeppe Tverskov | 1 | 0 | 1 |
| 13 | MF | 8 | Janus Drachmann | 1 | 0 | 1 |
| 13 | DF | 24 | Marco Lund | 1 | 0 | 1 |
| Own goals | | | | 0 | 0 | 0 |
| TOTALS | | | | 48 | 12 | 60 |

=== Disciplinary record ===
As of match played 25 May 2019

| No. | Pos. | Name | Superliga | | Sydbank Pokalen | | Total | |
| No. | Pos. | Name | Yellow card | Red card | Yellow card | Red card | Yellow card | Red card |
|---|---|---|---|---|---|---|---|---|
| 5 | DF | (Netherlands) Ramon Leeuwin | 6 | 0 | 0 | 0 | 6 | 0 |
| 6 | DF | (Denmark) Jeppe Tverskov | 5 | 0 | 0 | 0 | 5 | 0 |
| 8 | MF | (Denmark) Janus Drachmann | 5 | 0 | 0 | 0 | 5 | 0 |
| 24 | DF | (Denmark) Marco Lund | 5 | 0 | 0 | 0 | 5 | 0 |
| 11 | MF | (Denmark) Casper Nielsen | 3 | 0 | 1 | 0 | 4 | 0 |
| 9 | FW | (Denmark) Bashkim Kadrii | 4 | 0 | 0 | 0 | 4 | 0 |
| 16 | MF | (Denmark) Julius Eskesen | 3 | 0 | 0 | 0 | 3 | 0 |
| 20 | DF | (Denmark) Jacob Barrett Laursen | 3 | 0 | 0 | 0 | 3 | 0 |
| 2 | DF | (Denmark) Oliver Lund | 2 | 0 | 0 | 0 | 2 | 0 |
| 3 | DF | (Denmark) Alexander Ludwig | 2 | 0 | 0 | 0 | 2 | 0 |
| 4 | DF | (Denmark) Ryan Johnson Laursen | 2 | 0 | 0 | 0 | 2 | 0 |
| 13 | GK | (Norway) Sten Grytebust | 2 | 0 | 0 | 0 | 2 | 0 |
| 23 | MF | (Denmark) Troels Kløve | 2 | 0 | 0 | 0 | 2 | 0 |
| — | DF | (Denmark) Kenneth Emil Petersen | 2 | 0 | 0 | 0 | 2 | 0 |
| — | MF | (Denmark) Mikkel Desler | 2 | 0 | 0 | 0 | 2 | 0 |
| 10 | FW | (Denmark) Rasmus Festersen | 1 | 0 | 0 | 0 | 1 | 0 |
| 14 | MF | (Denmark) Jens Jakob Thomasen | 1 | 0 | 0 | 0 | 1 | 0 |
| 15 | FW | (Denmark) Nicklas Helenius | 1 | 0 | 0 | 0 | 1 | 0 |
| 21 | MF | (Denmark) Mathias Greve | 1 | 0 | 0 | 0 | 1 | 0 |
| 26 | MF | (Ivory Coast) Yao Dieudonne | 0 | 0 | 1 | 0 | 1 | 0 |
| 27 | GK | (Denmark) Oliver Christensen | 1 | 0 | 0 | 0 | 1 | 0 |
| 29 | MF | (Denmark) Mads Frøkjær-Jensen | 1 | 0 | 0 | 0 | 1 | 0 |
| Total | | | 54 | 0 | 2 | 0 | 56 | 0 |
