= 2019–20 F.C. Copenhagen season =

F.C. Copenhagen
2019–20 season
- Owner: Parken Sport & Entertainment
- Chairman: Bo Rygaard
- Manager: (Norway) Ståle Solbakken
- Stadium: Telia Parken
- Superliga: 2nd
- Danish Cup: Quarter-finals
- UEFA Champions League: Third qualifying round
- UEFA Europa League: Quarter-finals
- Top goalscorer: League: Dame N'Doye; Pieros Sotiriou (9 each); All: Pieros Sotiriou (13 goals)
- Highest home attendance: 29,310 on December 1, 2019 vs. Brøndby IF
- Lowest home attendance: 11,316 on August 25, 2019 vs. FC Nordsjælland (pre-COVID)
- Average home league attendance: 13,656 (13 public matches)
- Biggest win: 4–1 over Lyngby BK on June 1, 2020
- Biggest defeat: 1–4 to FC Midtjylland on November 10, 2019
| Home colours | Away colours | Third colours |

The 2019–20 season was F.C. Copenhagen's 28th season of existence, competing each year in the 3F Superliga, the top tier of football in Denmark. In addition to the 3F Superliga, Copenhagen advanced to the quarterfinals of the Sydbank Pokalen, the UEFA Europa League and advanced to the Third Qualifying Round of the 2019–20 UEFA Champions League. The season was interrupted by the COVID-19 pandemic, and matches were stopped after matches on March 8 and resumed on May 28.

== Squad ==
As of 20 February 2020

| No. | Name | Nationality | Position | Since | Date of birth | Signed from |
Goalkeepers
| 1 | Stephan Andersen | (Denmark) | GK | 2014 | 26 November 1981 | (Spain) Real Betis |
| 13 | Sten Grytebust | (Norway) | GK | 2019 | 25 October 1989 | (Denmark) Odense |
| 21 | Karl-Johan Johnsson | (Sweden) | GK | 2019 | 28 January 1990 | (France) En Avant de Guingamp |
Defenders
| 2 | Guillermo Varela | (Spain) (Uruguay) | DF | 2019 | 24 March 1993 | (Uruguay) Peñarol |
| 3 | Pierre Bengtsson | (Sweden) | DF | 2017 | 12 April 1988 | (Germany) 1. FSV Mainz 05 |
| 4 | Sotirios Papagiannopoulos | (Sweden) | DF | 2018 | 5 September 1990 | (Sweden) Östersunds FK |
| 5 | Andreas Bjelland (vice captain) | (Denmark) | DF | 2018 | 11 July 1988 | (England) Brentford F.C. |
| 17 | Karlo Bartolec | (Croatia) | DF | 2019 | 20 April 1995 | (Denmark) FC Nordsjælland |
| 19 | Bryan Oviedo | (Costa Rica) | DF | 2019 | 18 February 1990 | (England) Sunderland A.F.C. |
| 20 | Nicolai Boilesen | (Denmark) | DF | 2016 | 16 February 1992 | (Netherlands) AFC Ajax |
| 25 | Victor Nelsson | (Denmark) | DF | 2019 | 14 October 1998 | (Denmark) FC Nordsjælland |
| 27 | Ragnar Sigurðsson | (Iceland) | DF | 2020 | 19 June 1986 | (Russia) FC Rostov |
Midfielders
| 6 | Jens Stage | (Denmark) | MF | 2019 | 8 November 1996 | (Denmark) AGF |
| 7 | Viktor Fischer (3rd captain) | (Denmark) | MF | 2018 | 9 June 1994 | (Germany) 1. FSV Mainz 05 |
| 8 | Nicolaj Thomsen | (Denmark) | MF | 2017 | 8 May 1993 | (France) FC Nantes |
| 10 | Zeca (captain) | (Greece) (Portugal) | MF | 2017 | 31 Aug 1988 | (Greece) Panathinaikos F.C. |
| 11 | Mohamed Daramy | (Denmark) | FW | 2015 | 7 January 2002 | (Denmark) Homegrown |
| 16 | Pep Biel | (Spain) | MF | 2019 | 5 September 1996 | (Spain) Real Zaragoza |
| 24 | Robert Mudražija | (Croatia) | MF | 2019 | 5 May 1997 | (Croatia) NK Osijek |
| 33 | Rasmus Falk | (Denmark) | MF | 2016 | 15 January 1992 | (Denmark) Odense |
Forwards
| 14 | Dame N'Doye | (Senegal) | FW | 2018 | 21 February 1985 | (Turkey) Trabzonspor |
| 18 | Michael Santos | (Uruguay) | FW | 2019 | 13 March 1993 | (Spain) Málaga CF |
| 23 | Jonas Wind | (Denmark) | FW | 2016 | 7 February 1999 | (Denmark) Homegrown |
| 29 | Mikkel Kaufmann | (Denmark) | FW | 2020 | 3 January 2001 | (Denmark) AaB |

== Transfers and loans ==
From July 1, 2019. Arrivals include players returning from loans. Departures include players out on loan.

=== Arrivals ===
==== Summer ====
| Position | Player | Transferred from | Date | Fee |
|---|---|---|---|---|
| MF | (Denmark) Jens Stage | AGF | July 1, 2019 | £1.80m |
| GK | (Norway) Sten Grytebust | OB | July 1, 2019 | Free Transfer |
| DF | (Croatia) Karlo Bartolec | FC Nordsjælland | July 1, 2019 | Undisclosed |
| FW | (Denmark) Carlo Holse | Esbjerg fB | June 30, 2019 | End of Loan |
| DF | (Denmark) Mads Roerslev | Vendsyssel FF | June 30, 2019 | End of Loan |
| MF | (Serbia) (North Macedonia) Uroš Matić | Austria Wien | June 30, 2019 | End of Loan |
| MF | (Ivory Coast) Aboubakar Keita | OH Leuven | June 30, 2019 | End of Loan |
| MF | (Denmark) Victor Nelsson | FC Nordsjælland | July 5, 2019 | £3.24m |
| GK | (Sweden) Karl-Johan Johnsson | En Avant de Guingamp | July 11, 2019 | Undisclosed |
| DF | (Costa Rica) Bryan Oviedo | Sunderland A.F.C. | July 29, 2019 | Undisclosed |
| MF | (Spain) Pep Biel | Real Zaragoza | Aug 2, 2019 | £4.50m |
| FW | (Uruguay) Michael Santos | Málaga CF | Aug 21, 2019 | £1.98m |
| FW | (Denmark) Nicklas Bendtner | Rosenborg BK | Sep 2, 2019 | Undisclosed |

==== Winter ====
| Position | Player | Transferred from | Date | Fee |
|---|---|---|---|---|
| DF | (Iceland) Ragnar Sigurðsson | FC Rostov | January 12, 2020 | Undisclosed |
| FW | (Denmark) Mikkel Kaufmann | AaB | January 31, 2020 | £2.55m |

=== Departures ===
==== Summer ====
| Position | Player | Transferred to | Date | Fee |
|---|---|---|---|---|
| MF | (Ivory Coast) Aboubakar Keita | OH Leuven | July 1, 2019 | Undisclosed |
| MF | (Serbia) (North Macedonia) Uroš Matić | APOEL FC | July 1, 2019 | Out on Loan |
| DF | (Czech Republic) Michael Lüftner | AC Omonia | July 1, 2019 | Out on Loan |
| MF | (Denmark) William Kvist | Retired | July 1, 2019 | |
| DF | (Slovakia) Denis Vavro | S.S. Lazio | July 4, 2019 | £9.45m |
| GK | (Finland) Jesse Joronen | Brescia Calcio | July 11, 2019 | £4.50m |
| MF | (Denmark) Robert Skov | TSG 1899 Hoffenheim | July 27, 2019 | £9.00m |
| DF | (Denmark) Mads Roerslev | Brentford FC B | August 7, 2019 | Undisclosed |
| DF | (Denmark) Peter Ankersen | Genoa C.F.C. | September 2, 2019 | Undisclosed |

==== Winter ====
| Position | Player | Transferred to | Date | Fee |
|---|---|---|---|---|
| FW | (Denmark) Nicklas Bendtner | Without Club | January 1, 2020 | Released |
| GK | (Denmark) Frederik Ibsen | Kolding IF | January 24, 2020 | Free Transfer |
| FW | (Denmark) Carlo Holse | Rosenborg BK | January 31, 2020 | Undisclosed |
| FW | (Cyprus) Pieros Sotiriou | FC Astana | Feb 20, 2020 | £1.70m |

== Non-competitive ==
=== Pre-season Friendlies ===
| 28 June 2019 | Copenhagen | 0–0 | Fremad Amager | Frederiksberg |
| 12:00 | | FCK Summary | | Stadium: Nummer 10; Referee: Benjamin Willaume-Jantzen |

| 2 July 2019 | (Russia) FC Orenburg | 2–0 | Copenhagen | Bad Radkersburg, Austria |
| 18:00 | Thomsen 43' (o.g.); Alves 50' | FCK Summary | | Stadium: Parkthereme-Arena |

| 5 July 2019 | (Ukraine) FC Shakhtar Donetsk | 2–1 | Copenhagen | Wolfsberg, Austria |
| 17:00 | Moraes 15', 21' | FCK Summary | Holse 39' | Stadium: Lavanttal-Arena |

| 8 July 2019 | (Croatia) NK Osijek | 2–0 | Copenhagen | Kumberg, Austria |
| 17:00 | Marić 77', 79' | FCK Summary | | Stadium: Stadion Kumberg; Attendance: 50 |

=== Winter Friendlies ===
| 25 January 2020 | Copenhagen | 2–0 | Halmstads BK | København, Denmark |
| 12:00 | Fischer 14'; Stage 76' | FCK Summary | | Stadium: Telia Parken; Attendance: 1,367; Referee: (Denmark) Casper Thorsøe Jr. |

| 31 January 2020 The Atlantic Cup 2020 | (Kazakhstan) FC Astana | 0–1 | Copenhagen | Algarve, Portugal |
| 21:00 | | FCK Summary | Santos 3'; Daramy (yellow card) 69' | Stadium: Estádio Algarve; Attendance: 50; Referee: (Portugal) Carlos Cabral |

| 3 February 2020 The Atlantic Cup 2020 | (Sweden) IFK Norrköping | 0–0 (3–1 p) | Copenhagen | Albufeira, Portugal |
| 17:00 | | FCK Summary | | Stadium: Albufeira Municipal Stadium; Attendance: 73; Referee: (Portugal) João Bernardo |
| | Penalties |
| | Levi (penalty scored); Gerson (penalty missed); Jóhannesson (penalty scored); Kusu (penalty scored) | | Santos (penalty scored); Daramy (penalty missed); Zeca (penalty missed); Nelsson (penalty missed) |

| 7 February 2020 The Atlantic Cup 2020 | Copenhagen | 0–1 | Aarhus | Algarve, Portugal |
| 16:00 | | FCK Summary | Amini 90+2' (Bundu) | Stadium: Estádio Algarve; Referee: (Portugal) João Pedro Afonso |

=== Spring Friendlies (COVID-19 Restart) ===
| 22 March 2020 | Copenhagen | 2–2 | OB | København |
| 13:00 | Daramy 3'; Biel 40' | FCK Summary | Opondo 49'; Hansen 86' | Stadium: Telia Parken; Attendance: 0 Referee: Benjamin Willaume-Jantzen |

| 26 March 2020 | Copenhagen | 3–1 | SønderjyskE | København |
| 15:00 | Falk 26'; Daramy 56'; Gartenmann 45+2' (o.g.) | FCK Summary | Jacobsen 45+1' | Stadium: Telia Parken; Attendance: 0 Referee: Jesper Nielsen |

== Competitive ==
=== Competition record ===
| Competition | Record | | | | | | | |
| Competition | G | W | D | L | GF | GA | GD | Win % |
|---|---|---|---|---|---|---|---|---|
| 3F Superliga | 36 | 21 | 5 | 10 | 58 | 42 | +16 | 58.33 |
| Sydbank Pokalen | 3 | 2 | 1 | 0 | 5 | 4 | +1 | 66.67 |
| Champions League | 4 | 2 | 2 | 0 | 5 | 2 | +3 | 50.00 |
| Europa League | 13 | 5 | 4 | 4 | 15 | 10 | +5 | 38.46 |
| Total | 56 | 29 | 13 | 14 | 83 | 58 | +25 | 51.79 |

Last updated: 10 August 2020.
Source: Competitive matches

=== Superliga ===
==== Regular season ====
| Pos | Team | Pld | W | D | L | GF | GA | GD | Pts | Qualification |
|---|---|---|---|---|---|---|---|---|---|---|
| 1 | Midtjylland | 26 | 21 | 2 | 3 | 42 | 14 | +28 | 65 | Qualification for the Championship round |
| 2 | Copenhagen | 26 | 18 | 2 | 6 | 47 | 29 | +18 | 56 | Qualification for the Championship round |
| 3 | AGF | 26 | 14 | 5 | 7 | 42 | 28 | +14 | 47 | Qualification for the Championship round |
| 4 | Brøndby | 26 | 13 | 3 | 10 | 47 | 37 | +10 | 42 | Qualification for the Championship round |
| 5 | Nordsjælland | 26 | 12 | 5 | 9 | 48 | 35 | +13 | 41 | Qualification for the Championship round |

Source: Danish Football Association (in Danish), Soccerway
Rules for classification: 1) Points; 2) Goal difference; 3) Goals scored; 4) Away goals scored; 5) Play-off (played on neutral ground if determining teams for different rounds); 6) Draw.

==== Championship Round ====
| Pos | Team | Pld | W | D | L | GF | GA | GD | Pts | Qualification | MID | COP | AGF | BRO | AaB | NOR |
|---|---|---|---|---|---|---|---|---|---|---|---|---|---|---|---|---|
| 1 | Midtjylland (C) | 36 | 26 | 4 | 6 | 61 | 29 | +32 | 82 | Qualification for the Champions League second qualifying round | — | 3–1 | 3–4 | 0–0 | 1–2 | 6–3 |
| 2 | Copenhagen | 36 | 21 | 5 | 10 | 58 | 42 | +16 | 68 | Qualification for the Europa League second qualifying round | 1–2 | — | 2–4 | 0–0 | 2–0 | 2–1 |
| 3 | AGF (O) | 36 | 19 | 7 | 10 | 58 | 41 | +17 | 64 | Qualification for the European play-off match | 3–0 | 1–0 | — | 0–1 | 1–4 | 2–1 |
| 4 | Brøndby | 36 | 16 | 8 | 12 | 56 | 42 | +14 | 56 | | 1–1 | 1–1 | 0–0 | — | 0–1 | 4–0 |
| 5 | AaB | 36 | 16 | 6 | 14 | 54 | 44 | +10 | 54 | | 0–2 | 0–1 | 1–0 | 2–0 | — | 0–4 |
| 6 | Nordsjælland | 36 | 13 | 8 | 15 | 59 | 54 | +5 | 47 | | 0–1 | 1–1 | 1–1 | 0–2 | 0–0 | — |

Source: Danish Football Association (in Danish), Soccerway
Legend: Blue = home team win; Yellow = draw; Red = away team win.
(C) Champions; (O) Play-off winners

===== Matches =====
| 14 July 2019 Round 1 | OB | 2–3 | Copenhagen | Odense |
| 16:00 CEST | Kløve 1' (Johnson) 31' (Drachmann); Tverskov (yellow card) 45'; Kadrii (yellow card) 84' | FCK Summary | Wind 42' (N'Doye); N'Doye 48' (Fischer) (yellow card) 58' (goal) 70' (Holse); Varela (yellow card) 84' | Stadium: Nature Energy Park; Attendance: 9,067; Referee: Michael Tykgaard |

| 19 July 2019 Round 2 | Copenhagen | 2–1 | AGF | København |
| 19:00 CEST | Nelsson (yellow card) 11'; Bengtsson 12' (Fischer); Wind 63' (Fischer); Stage (yellow card) 71' | FCK Summary | Poulsen (yellow card) 63'; Þorsteinsson (yellow card) 74' (goal) 81' (Ankersen) | Stadium: Telia Parken; Attendance: 16,053; Referee: Anders Poulsen |

| 27 July 2019 Round 3 | AC Horsens | 0–2 | Copenhagen | Horsens |
| 17:30 CEST | Hansson (yellow card) 1'; Lumb (yellow card) 51'; Jacobsen (yellow card) 64' | FCK Summary | Wind 81'; N'Doye 85' (Daramy) | Stadium: CASA Arena Horsens; Attendance: 3,565; Referee: Jakob Kehlet |

| 3 August 2019 Round 4 | SønderjyskE | 1–2 | Copenhagen | Haderslev |
| 16:00 CEST | Albæk (yellow card) 17'; Banggaard (yellow card) 36'; Jakobsen 47' (yellow card) 59'; Gartenmann (yellow card) 53' | FCK Summary | N'Doye 2' (Wind) (yellow card) 45+2'; Zeca (yellow card) 32'; Holse (yellow card) 40'; Stage 49' (Holse) | Stadium: Sydbank Park; Attendance: 7,417; Referee: Peter Kjærsgaard |

| 9 August 2019 Round 5 | Copenhagen | 2–0 | Lyngby Boldklub | København |
| 18:30 CEST | Wind 46' (Fischer) 60' (Bartolec); Oviedo (yellow card) 51' | FCK Summary | Geertsen (yellow card) 26'; Riel (yellow card) 42'; Fosgaard (yellow card) 50'; Tshiembe (yellow card) 89'; Enghardt (yellow card) 90+3' | Stadium: Telia Parken; Attendance: 15,747; Referee: Sandi Putros |

| 16 August 2019 Round 6 | Randers FC | 0–1 | Copenhagen | Randers |
| 18:00 CEST | Nielsen (yellow card) 55'; Thomsen (yellow card) 88' | FCK Summary | Nelsson (yellow card) 53'; Stage (yellow card) 55'; Nielsen 90' (o.g.) | Stadium: Cepheus Park Randers; Attendance: 5,119; Referee: Mads-Kristoffer Kristoffersen |

| 25 August 2019 Round 7 | Copenhagen | 3–1 | FC Nordsjælland | København |
| 20:00 CEST | Jenssen 3' (o.g.); Thomsen (yellow card) 45+2'; Sotiriou 74' (Stage) 76' | FCK Summary | Sadiq 30' (Damsgaard); Rasmussen (yellow card) 66'; Francis (yellow card) 82' | Stadium: Telia Parken; Attendance: 11,316; Referee: Jorgen Daugbjerg Burchardt |

| 1 September 2019 Round 8 | AaB | 1–0 | Copenhagen | Aalborg |
| 16:00 CEST | Kusk 18'; Olsen (yellow card) 50'; Christensen (yellow card) 59'; Ahlmann (yellow card) 80'; Andersen (yellow card) 90+3' | FCK Summary | Bjelland (yellow card) 79' | Stadium: Nordjyske Arena; Attendance: 11,645; Referee: Jakob Kehlet |

| 15 September 2019 Round 9 | Hobro IK | 2–1 | Copenhagen | Hobro |
| 16:00 CEST | Kristoffersen 4' (Babayan); Sabbi 13' (Babayan); Kirkevold (yellow card) 41'; Cappis (yellow card) 43'; Babayan (yellow card) 90+6' | FCK Summary | Santos 25' (Biel) | Stadium: DS Arena; Attendance: 5,428; Referee: Peter Kjærsgaard-Andersen |

| 22 September 2019 Round 10 | Copenhagen | 0–0 | FC Midtjylland | København |
| 18:00 CEST | Fischer (yellow card) 27'; Sotiriou (yellow card) 35' | FCK Summary | Mabil (yellow card) 76' (yellow-red card) 90'; Andersson (yellow card) 78'; Evander (yellow card) 90+3'; Kaba (yellow card) 90+7' | Stadium: Telia Parken; Attendance: 24,464; Referee: Jakob Kehlet |

| 28 September 2019 Round 11 | Copenhagen | 4–2 | Silkeborg IF | København |
| 17:00 CEST | Gertsen 6' (o.g.); Sotirou 24' (pen.); Santos 28'; Zeca 34' (Biel) | FCK Summary | Schwartz 56' (Crone) 69' (Crone) | Stadium: Telia Parken; Attendance: 18,393; Referee: Mads-Kristoffer Kristoffersen |

| 6 October 2019 Round 12 | Brøndby IF | 3–1 | Copenhagen | Brøndbyvester |
| 14:00 CEST | Hedlund 6' (Radošević) (yellow card) 45}2'; Wilczek 23' (Hedlund) 76'; Hermannsson (yellow card) 29' | FCK Summary | Maxsø 30' (o.g.); Bendtner (yellow card) 31'; Stage (yellow card) 42'; Falk (red card) 65'; Zeca (yellow card) 75' | Stadium: Brøndby Stadion; Attendance: 21,746; Referee: Jorgen Daugbjerg Burchardt |

| 20 October 2019 Round 13 | Copenhagen | 3–1 | Esbjerg fB | København |
| 16:00 CEST | Santos 21'; Varela (yellow card) 27'; Sotiriou 86' (Fischer) | FCK Summary | Soiri (yellow card) 85'; Yakovenko 90' | Stadium: Telia Parken; Attendance: 13,872; Referee: Mikkel Redder |

| 28 October 2019 Round 14 | AGF | 1–2 | Copenhagen | Aarhus |
| 19:00 CEST | Højer (yellow card) 32'; Þorsteinsson (yellow card) 44' (goal) 56'; Backman (yellow card) 82'; Duncan (yellow card) 87' | FCK Summary | N'Doye 17' (Fischer) 51' (Fischer); Santos (yellow card) 30' | Stadium: Ceres Park; Attendance: 13,884; Referee: Mads-Kristoffer Kristoffersen |

| 3 November 2019 Round 15 | Copenhagen | 3–0 | SønderjyskE | København |
| 18:00 CEST | Biel 18' (pen.); Santos 63' (pen.); Sotiriou 86' (yellow card) 90' | FCK Summary | Jónsson (yellow card) 17'; Hassan (yellow card) 34'; Jakobsen (yellow card) 62'; Banggaard (yellow card) 65'; Dovbyk (yellow card) 90+3' | Stadium: Telia Parken; Attendance: 11,394; Referee: Peter Kjærsgaard-Andersen |

| 10 November 2019 Round 16 | FC Midtjylland | 4–1 | Copenhagen | Herning |
| 18:00 CEST | Kaba 28' 52' (Evander); Evander 42' (Mabil); Sviatchenko 60' (Evander); Onyeka (yellow card) 72'; Brumado (yellow card) 84' | Summary | Stage (yellow card) 20'; N'Doye 56' | Stadium: MCH Arena; Attendance: 11,422; Referee: Jens Maae |

| 24 November 2019 Round 17 | Copenhagen | 2–1 | Hobro IK | København |
| 21:00 CEST | N'Doye (yellow card) 70'; Sotiriou 82' (N'Doye) 83' | FCK Summary | Louati 30'; Haarup (yellow card) 45+1' | Stadium: Telia Parken; Attendance: 11,512; Referee: Mads-Kristoffer Kristoffersen |

| 1 December 2019 Round 18 | Copenhagen | 2–1 | Brøndby IF | København |
| 11:45 CEST | Fischer 28' (N'Doye) 90' (Mudražija); Santos (yellow card) 82' | FCK Summary | Wilczek 6' (Hedlund); Hedlund (yellow card) 15'; Larsson (yellow card) 80'; Maxsø (yellow card) 82' | Stadium: Telia Parken; Attendance: 29,310; Referee: Jakob Kehlet |

| 8 December 2019 Round 19 | FC Nordsjælland | 0–1 | Copenhagen | Farum |
| 16:00 CEST | Christensen (yellow card) 22' | FCK Summary | N'Doye 28'; Nelsson (yellow card) 36'; Falk (yellow card) 70' | Stadium: Right to Dream Park; Attendance: 5,133; Referee: Mads-Kristoffer Kristoffersen |

| 16 December 2019 Round 20 | Copenhagen | 2–1 | OB | København |
| 19:00 CEST | Santos (yellow card) 76'; Sotiriou 80' (pen.) 82' (Bengtsson) (yellow card) 90+3'; Nelsson (yellow card) 90+1'; Zeca (yellow card) 90+5' | FCK Summary | Jacobsen 7' (Greve) (yellow card) 65'; Andersen (yellow card) 33'; Thomasen (yellow card) 58'; Lund (yellow card) 80'; Drachmann (yellow card) 90+5' | Stadium: Telia Parken; Attendance: 12,226; Referee: Jorgen Daugbjerg Burchardt |

| 14 February 2020 Round 21 | Esbjerg fB | 1–0 | Copenhagen | Esbjerg |
| 19:00 CEST | Conboy (yellow card) 38'; Kauko (yellow card) 42'; Austin 45+1' (Kurzawa); Yakovenko (yellow card) 77' | FCK Summary | N'Doye (yellow card) 32'; Johnsson (yellow card) 71' | Stadium: Blue Water Arena; Attendance: 5,449; Referee: Sandi Putros |

| 23 February 2020 Round 22 | Silkeborg IF | 1–1 | Copenhagen | Silkeborg |
| 16:00 CEST | Moberg 35'; Brumado (yellow card) 61' (yellow-red card) 90+4'; Romo (yellow card) 90' | FCK Summary | Stage 65' (Kaufmann) (yellow card) 82' | Stadium: JYSK Park; Attendance: 3,282; Referee: Anders Poulsen |

| 1 March 2020 Round 23 | Copenhagen | 3–2 | AaB | København |
| 18:00 CEST | Zeca (yellow card) 8'; Santos 55' (Oviedo) 64' (Daramy); Biel 57' (Daramy); Falk (yellow card) 89' | FCK Summary | Andersen (yellow card) 9' (goal) 72'; Christensen (yellow card) 61'; Zeca 77' (o.g.) | Stadium: Telia Parken; Attendance: 13,240; Referee: Jakob Kehlet |

| 8 March 2020 Round 24 | Copenhagen | 0–1 | AC Horsens | København |
| 16:00 CEST | Varela (yellow card) 77' | FCK Summary | Okosun (yellow card) 56'; Mašović (yellow card) 69'; Jacobsen (yellow card) 74'; Ludwig 81' (Killerich) | Stadium: Telia Parken; Attendance: 0 Referee: Morten Krogh |

| 1 June 2020 Round 25 | Lyngby BK | 1–4 | Copenhagen | Lyngby |
| 18:00 CEST | Corlu (yellow card) 45'; Geertsen (yellow card) 64'; Warming 71' (Marcussen); Enghardt (yellow card) 90+4' | FCK Summary | Falk 33' (Daramy); Daramy 73' (Bengtsson); Biel 86' (pen.); Bartolec | Stadium: Lyngby Stadion; Attendance: 0 Referee: Anders Poulsen |

| 7 June 2020 Round 26 | Copenhagen | 2–1 | Randers FC | København |
| 17:00 CEST | Kaufmann 3' (Bjelland); Stage 26' (Varela) | FCK Summary | Riis 83' (Rømer) | Stadium: Telia Parken; Attendance: 0 Referee: Mads Kristoffer-Kristoffersen |

| 15 June 2020 Round 27 / Championship Round 1 | FC Nordsjælland | 1–1 | Copenhagen | Farum |
| 18:00 CEST | Kudus (yellow card) 29'; Mumin (yellow card) 51'; Mesík (yellow card) 63'; Sulemana 66' (Damsgaard) | FCK Summary | Stage 22' (Biel)} Falk (yellow card) 87' | Stadium: Right to Dream Park; Attendance: 273; Referee: Jakob Kehlet |

| 17 June 2020 Round 28 / Championship Round 2 | Copenhagen | 2–0 | AaB | København |
| 20:00 CEST | Daramy 2' (Stage) 27' (Varela); Oviedo (yellow card) 4'; Bjelland (yellow card) 72' | FCK Summary | van Weert (yellow card) 17' | Stadium: Telia Parken; Attendance: 237; Referee: Benjamin Willaume-Jantzen |

| 21 June 20120 Round 29 / Championship Round 3 | Brøndby IF | 1–1 | Copenhagen | Brøndbyvester |
| 18:00 CEST | Zeca (yellow card) 21'; Bengtsson (yellow card) 32'; Biel 79' (Falk); Bartolec (yellow card) 90+1' | FCK Summary | Rosted (yellow card) 25'; Lindstrøm (yellow card) 76'; Uhre 89'; Hedlund (yellow card) 90+1'; Jung (yellow card) 90+1' | Stadium: Brøndby Stadion; Attendance: 2,750; Referee: Mads-Kristoffer Kristoffersen |

| 28 June 2020 Round 30 / Championship Round 4 | Copenhagen | 1–2 | FC Midtjylland | København |
| 20:00 CEST | Stage (yellow card) 25'; Paulinho 90+2' (o.g.); Mudražija (yellow card) 90+4' | FCK Summary | Kaba 32'; Paulinho (yellow card) 60'; Vibe 68' (Mabil) | Stadium: Telia Parken; Attendance: 249; Referee: Jakob Kehlet |

| 5 July 2020 Round 31 / Championship Round 5 | AGF | 1–0 | Copenhagen | Aarhus |
| 20:00 CEST | Munksgaard (yellow card) 51'; Johnsson 75' (o.g.); Links (yellow card) 90+2'; Ankersen (yellow card) 90+6' | FCK Summary | | Stadium: Ceres Park; Attendance: 7,048; Referee: Jens Maae |

| 9 July 2019 Round 32 / Championship Round 6 | FC Midtjylland | 3–1 | Copenhagen | Herning |
| 20:00 CEST | Mabil (yellow card) 32' (goal) 81' (Evander); Kaba 63' (pen.); Dreyer 79' (Andersson) | Summary | Daramy 22'; Zeca (yellow card) 62' | Stadium: MCH Arena; Attendance: 4,097; Referee: Jørgen Daugbjerg Burchardt |

| 12 July 2020 Round 33 / Championship Round 7 | Copenhagen | 0–0 | Brøndby IF | København |
| 18:00 CEST | | FCK Summary | Rosted (yellow card) 71'; Fisker (yellow card) 85' | Stadium: Telia Parken; Attendance: 7,665; Referee: Jakob Kehlet |

| 19 July 2020 Round 34 / Championship Round 8 | Copenhagen | 2–4 | AGF | København |
| 20:00 CEST | Stage (yellow card) 17' (goal) 42'; Bjelland (yellow card) 53'; Wind 63' (pen.) | FCK Summary | Diks 21' (Højer) (yellow card) 57'; Ankersen 35' (Blume); Tingager (yellow card) 43'; Højer 52' (Hvidt); Þorsteinsson (yellow card) 61'; Poulsen (yellow card) 64'; Mortensen 76' (Højer) (yellow card) 84' | Stadium: Telia Parken; Attendance: 6,849; Referee: Michael Tykgaard |

| 23 July 2019 Round 35 / Championship Round 9 | AaB | 0–1 | Copenhagen | Aalborg |
| 20:00 CEST | | Summary | Zeca 53'; Falk (yellow card) 55'; Wind (yellow card) 70'; Papagiannopoulos (yellow card) 82' | Stadium: Aalborg Portland Park; Attendance: 3,247; Referee: Peter Kjærsgaard-Andersen |

| 26 July 2020 Round 36 / Championship Round 10 | Copenhagen | 2–1 | FC Nordsjælland | København |
| 19:00 CEST | Wind 12' (Bengtsson); Bengtsson (yellow card) 34'; Thomsen (yellow card) 44'; N'Doye 86' (Wind) | FCK Summary | Rygaard 35' (pen.); Andersen (yellow card) 64'; Sulemana (yellow card) 79'; Thychosen (yellow card) 90+3' | Stadium: Telia Parken; Attendance: 7,466; Referee: Mads-Kristoffer Kristoffersen |

=== Sydbank Pokalen ===
==== Danish Cup Matches ====
| 25 September 2019 Third Round | Hillerød Fodbold | 1–1 (2–4 p) | Copenhagen | Hillerød |
| 16:30 CEST | Kristensen (yellow card) 55' (yellow-red card) 109'; Witt 73' | FCK Summary | Fischer 76'; Falk (yellow card) 82' (yellow-red card) 93' | Stadium: Hillerød Stadion; Attendance: 3,247; Referee: Anders Poulsen |
| | Penalties |
| | Abbouch (penalty scored); Witt (penalty missed); Nielsen (penalty missed); Fitel (penalty scored) | | Bendtner (penalty scored); Zeca (penalty scored); Nelsson (penalty scored); Holse (penalty scored) |

| 31 October 2019 Fourth Round | Copenhagen | 4–1 | FC Nordsjælland | København |
| 17:30 CEST | Bendtner 24' (Stage); Daramy 66' (Oviedo) 75' (Sotiriou); Sotiriou; Thomsen (yellow card) 71' | FCK Summary | Rasmussen 2' (Damsgaard) | Stadium: Telia Parken; Attendance: 9,238; Referee: Mads-Kristoffer Kristoffersen |

| 3 March 2020 Quarter-finals | AaB | 2–0 | Copenhagen | Aalborg |
| 17:00 CEST | Ross 43'; Klitten 49' | FCK Summary | Santos (yellow card) 18'; Bartolec (yellow card) 75' | Stadium: Nordjyske Arena; Attendance: 7,739; Referee: Jens Maae |

=== UEFA Champions League ===
==== Second qualifying round ====
| Team 1 | Agg. | Team 2 | 1st leg | 2nd leg |
|---|---|---|---|---|
| The New Saints F.C. (Wales) | 0–3 | (Denmark) Copenhagen | 0–2 | 0–1 |

| 23 July 2019 First Leg | The New Saints F.C. (Wales) | 0–2 | Copenhagen | (England) Oswestry, Shropshire |
| 20:00 CET | Davies (yellow card) 58' | FCK Summary | Sotiriou 18' (Bartolec); Skov 61' (pen.) | Stadium: Park Hall; Attendance: 1,160; Referee: (Austria) Alexander Harkam |

| 31 July 2019 Second Leg | Copenhagen | 1–0 | (Wales) The New Saints F.C. | København |
| 19:45 CET | Zeca 52' | FCK Summary | Spender (yellow card) 71' | Stadium: Telia Parken; Attendance: 12,523; Referee: (France) Karim Abed |

==== Third qualifying round ====
| Team 1 | Agg. | Team 2 | 1st leg | 2nd leg |
|---|---|---|---|---|
| Red Star Belgrade (Serbia) | 2–2 | (Denmark) Copenhagen | 1–1 | 1–1 |

| 6 August 2019 First Leg | Red Star Belgrade (Serbia) | 1–1 | Copenhagen | (Serbia) Belgrade |
| 20:45 CEST | Pavkov 44' (Ivanić); Degenek (yellow card) 50'; Marin (yellow card) 79'; Jovančić (yellow card) 83' | FCK Summary | Zeca (yellow card) 24'; Wind 84' (pen.) | Stadium: Rajko Mitić Stadium; Attendance: 40,812; Referee: (Portugal) Tiago Martins |

| 13 August 2019 Second Leg | Copenhagen | 1–1 (a.e.t.) (2–2 agg.) (6–7 p) | (Serbia) Red Star Belgrade | København |
| 20:00 CEST | N'Doye (yellow card) 27' (goal) 45' (Bengtsson); Varela (yellow card) 71'; Biel (yellow card) 88' (yellow-red card) 112' | FCK Summary | Milunović (yellow card) 6' (yellow-red card) 54'; Boakye 17' (Marin) (yellow card) 50'; Morjan (yellow card) 28'; Jovančić (yellow card) 37'; Ivanić (yellow card) 108'; Marin (yellow card) 110' | Stadium: Telia Parken; Attendance: 29,872; Referee: (Lithuania) Gediminas Mažeika |
| | Penalties |
| | Wind (penalty scored); Fischer (penalty missed); Sotiriou (penalty scored); Bengtsson (penalty missed); Zeca (penalty scored); N'Doye (penalty missed); Bartolec (penalty missed); Nelsson (penalty scored); Papagiannopoulos (penalty scored); Grytebust (penalty scored); Wind (penalty missed) | | (penalty missed) Marin; (penalty scored) Ivanić; (penalty missed) Jevtović; (penalty scored) Jander; (penalty scored) Pankov; (penalty missed) Jovančić; (penalty missed) Simić; (penalty scored) Degenek; (penalty scored) Gobeljić; (penalty scored) Borjan; (penalty scored) Pankov |

=== UEFA Europa League ===
==== Playoff round ====
| 22 Aug 2019 First Leg | Copenhagen | 3–1 | (Latvia) Riga FC | København |
| 20:00 CET | Kamešs 41' (Brisola) | FCK Summary | Fischer 18' (Bengtsson); Sotiriou 62' (pen.); Daramy 90+3' (Santos) | Stadium: Telia Parken; Attendance: 13,930; Referee: (Netherlands) Bas Nijhuis |

| 29 Aug 2019 Second Leg | Riga FC (Latvia) | 1–0 (2–3 agg.) | Copenhagen | (Latvia) Riga |
| 18:45 CET | Prenga (yellow card) 20'; Valerianos (yellow card) 34' (yellow-red card) 90+4'; Kamešs (yellow card) 57'; Sharpar (yellow card) 57'; Brisola 75' (Laizāns) | FCK Summary | Papagiannopoulos (yellow card) 39'; Fischer (yellow card) 65' | Stadium: Skonto Stadium; Attendance: 7,055; Referee: (Poland) Paweł Gil |

==== Group stage ====
===== Group B =====
| Pos | Team | Pld | W | D | L | GF | GA | GD | Pts | Qualification |
|---|---|---|---|---|---|---|---|---|---|---|
| 1 | (Sweden) Malmö FF | 6 | 3 | 2 | 1 | 8 | 6 | +2 | 11 | Advance to knockout phase |
| 2 | (Denmark) Copenhagen | 6 | 2 | 3 | 1 | 5 | 4 | +1 | 9 | Advance to knockout phase |
| 3 | (Ukraine) Dynamo Kyiv | 6 | 1 | 4 | 1 | 7 | 7 | 0 | 7 | |
| 4 | (Switzerland) Lugano | 6 | 0 | 3 | 3 | 2 | 5 | −3 | 3 | |

Source: UEFA
Rules for classification: Group stage tiebreakers

| 19 September 2019 1 | Copenhagen | 1–0 | (Switzerland) FC Lugano | København |
| 18:55 CEST (UTC+02:00) | Santos 50' (Bengtsson) | Summary | Vécsei (yellow card) 67'; Carlinhos (yellow card) 90+1' | Stadium: Telia Parken; Attendance: 18,240; Referee: (Portugal) Fábio Veríssimo |

| 3 October 2019 2 | Malmö FF (Sweden) | 1–1 | Copenhagen | (Sweden) Malmö |
| 21:00 CEST (UTC+02:00) | Nielsen (yellow card) 49'; Rosenberg 55' (yellow card) 58'; Bachirou (yellow card) 63' | Summary | Santos (yellow card) 28'; Zeca (yellow card) 31'; Nielsen 45+5' (o.g.); Bjelland (yellow card) 76'; Stage (yellow card) 87' | Stadium: Stadion; Attendance: 19,884; Referee: (Germany) Deniz Aytekin |

| 24 October 2019 3 | FC Dynamo Kyiv (Ukraine) | 1–1 | Copenhagen | (Ukraine) Kyiv |
| 21:00 CEST (UTC+02:00) | Sydorchuk (yellow card) 22'; Verbič (yellow card) 46'; Shabanov 53' (Tsyhankov); Kędziora (yellow card) 55'; Besyedin (yellow card) 68' | Summary | Sotiriou 2' (Stage); Stage (yellow card) 51'; Bartolec (yellow card) 59' | Stadium: NSC Olimpiyskiy; Attendance: 21,202; Referee: (Turkey) Halil Umut Meler |

| 7 November 2019 4 | Copenhagen | 1–1 | (Ukraine) FC Dynamo Kyiv | København |
| 18:55 CEST (UTC+02:00) | Stage 4'; Zeca (yellow card) 64'; Santos (yellow card) 83'; Nelsson (yellow card) 83' | Summary | Verbič 70' (Tsyhankov); Shabanov (yellow card) 83' | Stadium: Telia Parken; Attendance: 23,166; Referee: (Hungary) Tamás Bognár |

| 28 November 2019 5 | FC Lugano (Switzerland) | 0–1 | Copenhagen | (Switzerland) St. Gallen |
| CEST (UTC+02:00) | Guidotti (yellow card) 48'; Carlinhos (yellow card) 60'; Custodio (yellow card) 81' | Summary | Thomsen 26' (Bartolec); Zeca (yellow card) 36'; Papagiannopoulos (yellow card) 89' | Stadium: Kybunpark; Attendance: 1,281; Referee: (Russia) Aleksei Eskov |

| 12 December 2019 6 | Copenhagen | 0–1 | (Sweden) Malmö FF | København |
| CEST (UTC+02:00) | Fischer (yellow card) 45+2'; Falk (yellow card) 49'; Thomsen (yellow card) 63' | Summary | Christiansen (yellow card) 26'; Bengtsson (yellow card) 45+2'; Innocent (yellow card) 59'; Rakip (yellow card) 67'; Papagiannopoulos 77' (o.g.); Larsson (yellow card) 87' | Stadium: Telia Parken; Attendance: 32,941; Referee: (Italy) Davide Massa |

==== Knockout phase ====
===== Round of 32 =====
| 20 February 2020 First Leg | Copenhagen | 1–1 | (Scotland) Celtic F.C. | København |
| 18:55 CET (UTC+01:00) | Oviedo (yellow card) 49'; N'Doye 52' (Falk) | Summary | Édouard 14' (McGregor); Brown (yellow card) 68'; Christie (yellow card) 78'; Bitton (yellow card) 83' | Stadium: Telia Parken; Attendance: 34,346; Referee: (Russia) Sergei Karasev |

| 27 February 2020 Second Leg | Celtic F.C. (Scotland) | 1–3 (2–4 agg.) | Copenhagen | (Scotland) Glasgow |
| 21:00 CET (UTC+01:00) 20:00 WET (UTC+00:00) | Ajer (yellow card) 16'; Édouard 83' (pen.) | Summary | Santos 51'; Sigurðsson (yellow card) 82'; Biel 85' (Falk); N'Doye 88' | Stadium: Celtic Park; Attendance: 56,172; Referee: (Portugal) Artur Soares Dias |

===== Round of 16 =====
| 12 March 2020 First Leg | İstanbul Başakşehir F.K. (Turkey) | 1–0 | Copenhagen | (Turkey) Başakşehir |
| 18:55 CET (UTC+01:00) | Kahveci (yellow card) 4'; Crivelli (yellow card) 60'; Višća 88' (pen.); Okechukwu (yellow card) 90+3' | FCK Summary | Santos (yellow card) 4' | Stadium: Fatih Terim Stadium; Attendance: 12,205; Referee: (Scotland) Willie Collum |

| 5 August 2020 Second Leg | Copenhagen | 3–0 (3–1 agg.) | (Turkey) İstanbul Başakşehir F.K. | København |
| 18:55 CET (UTC+01:00) | Wind 4' (Varela) 52' (pen.); Falk 62' (Wind); Bartolec (yellow card) 87' | FCK Summary | Elia (yellow card) 83' | Stadium: Telia Parken; Attendance: 0 Referee: (Italy) Daniele Orsato |

===== Quarter-finals =====
| 10 August 2020 Quarter-finals | Manchester United (England) | 1–0 (a.e.t.) | Copenhagen | (Germany) Cologne |
| 21:00 CET (UTC+01:00) | Maguire (yellow card) 61'; Bailly (yellow card) 63'; Fernandes 94' (pen.) | | Kaufmann (yellow card) 75'; Stage (yellow card) 77'; Zeca (yellow card) 105+3' | Stadium: RheinEnergieStadion; Attendance: 0 Referee: (France) Clément Turpin |

== Statistics ==
=== Appearances ===
As of 10 August 2020

This includes all competitive matches and refers to all squad members playing throughout the season, regardless of their current roster status.

| Rank | Pos | No. | Player | Superliga | Sydbank Pokalen | UEFA Champions League | UEFA Europa League | Total |
|---|---|---|---|---|---|---|---|---|
| 1 | MF | 10 | (Greece) Zeca | 35 | 3 | 4 | 12 | 54 |
| 2 | DF | 25 | (Denmark) Victor Nelsson | 34 | 3 | 4 | 12 | 53 |
| 3 | MF | 6 | (Denmark) Jens Stage | 31 | 2 | 4 | 11 | 48 |
| 4 | MF | 33 | (Denmark) Rasmus Falk | 30 | 2 | 2 | 13 | 47 |
| 5 | DF | 3 | (Sweden) Pierre Bengtsson | 31 | 0 | 4 | 11 | 46 |
| 6 | DF | 2 | (Uruguay) Guillermo Varela | 27 | 1 | 3 | 12 | 43 |
| 7 | DF | 4 | (Sweden) Sotirios Papagiannopoulos | 27 | 2 | 4 | 9 | 42 |
| 7 | GK | 21 | (Sweden) Karl-Johan Johnsson | 29 | 1 | 1 | 11 | 42 |
| 9 | MF | 16 | (Spain) Pep Biel | 29 | 3 | 2 | 7 | 41 |
| 9 | FW | 11 | (Denmark) Mohamed Daramy | 29 | 3 | 1 | 8 | 41 |
| 11 | DF | 17 | (Croatia) Karlo Bartolec | 23 | 3 | 4 | 9 | 39 |
| 12 | FW | 18 | (Uruguay) Michael Santos | 23 | 2 | 0 | 11 | 36 |
| 13 | MF | 7 | (Denmark) Viktor Fischer | 20 | 2 | 3 | 8 | 33 |
| 14 | DF | 5 | (Denmark) Andreas Bjelland | 21 | 2 | 0 | 8 | 31 |
| 15 | FW | 9 | (Cyprus) Pieros Sotiriou | 18 | 1 | 3 | 8 | 30 |
| 16 | DF | 19 | (Costa Rica) Bryan Oviedo | 13 | 3 | 1 | 5 | 22 |
| 17 | FW | 14 | (Senegal) Dame N'Doye | 14 | 1 | 3 | 3 | 21 |
| 18 | MF | 8 | (Denmark) Nicolaj Thomsen | 12 | 2 | 1 | 5 | 20 |
| 18 | FW | 29 | (Denmark) Mikkel Kaufmann | 15 | 0 | 0 | 5 | 20 |
| 20 | FW | 23 | (Denmark) Jonas Wind | 13 | 0 | 4 | 2 | 19 |
| 21 | MF | 26 | (Denmark) Carlo Holse | 9 | 1 | 4 | 3 | 17 |
| 22 | GK | 13 | (Norway) Sten Grytebust | 7 | 2 | 3 | 2 | 14 |
| 22 | MF | 24 | (Croatia) Robert Mudražija | 10 | 0 | 0 | 4 | 14 |
| 24 | FW | 32 | (Denmark) Nicklas Bendtner | 6 | 2 | 0 | 1 | 9 |
| 25 | DF | 27 | (Iceland) Ragnar Sigurðsson | 2 | 0 | 0 | 2 | 4 |
| 25 | DF | 20 | (Denmark) Nicolai Boilesen | 2 | 0 | 0 | 2 | 4 |
| 27 | MF | 29 | (Denmark) Robert Skov | 2 | 0 | 1 | 0 | 3 |
| 28 | MF | 37 | (Denmark) Ahmed Daghim | 0 | 1 | 1 | 0 | 2 |
| 28 | FW | 29 | (Denmark) William Bøving | 0 | 1 | 0 | 1 | 2 |

=== Goalscorers ===
As of 10 August 2020

This includes all competitive matches.

| Rnk | Pos | No. | Player | Superliga | Sydbank Pokalen | UEFA Champions League | UEFA Europa League | Total |
|---|---|---|---|---|---|---|---|---|
| 1 | FW | 9 | (Cyprus) Pieros Sotiriou | 9 | 1 | 1 | 2 | 13 |
| 2 | FW | 14 | (Senegal) Dame N'Doye | 9 | 0 | 1 | 2 | 12 |
| 3 | FW | 23 | (Denmark) Jonas Wind | 7 | 0 | 1 | 2 | 10 |
| 4 | FW | 18 | (Uruguay) Michael Santos | 7 | 0 | 0 | 2 | 9 |
| 5 | FW | 11 | (Denmark) Mohamed Daramy | 4 | 2 | 0 | 1 | 7 |
| 6 | MF | 6 | (Denmark) Jens Stage | 5 | 0 | 0 | 1 | 6 |
| 7 | MF | 7 | (Denmark) Viktor Fischer | 2 | 1 | 0 | 1 | 4 |
| 7 | MF | 16 | (Spain) Pep Biel | 3 | 0 | 0 | 1 | 4 |
| 9 | MF | 10 | (Greece) (Portugal) Zeca | 2 | 0 | 1 | 0 | 3 |
| 10 | MF | 33 | (Denmark) Rasmus Falk | 1 | 0 | 0 | 1 | 2 |
| 11 | DF | 3 | (Sweden) Pierre Bengtsson | 1 | 0 | 0 | 0 | 1 |
| 11 | MF | 29 | (Denmark) Robert Skov | 0 | 0 | 1 | 0 | 1 |
| 11 | FW | 32 | (Denmark) Nicklas Bendtner | 0 | 1 | 0 | 0 | 1 |
| 11 | MF | 8 | (Denmark) Nicolaj Thomsen | 0 | 0 | 0 | 1 | 1 |
| 11 | DF | 17 | (Croatia) Karlo Bartolec | 1 | 0 | 0 | 0 | 1 |
| 11 | FW | 29 | (Denmark) Mikkel Kaufmann | 1 | 0 | 0 | 0 | 1 |
| | O.G. | | Opponent Own goal | 5 | 0 | 0 | 1 | 6 |
| TOTALS | | | | 58 | 5 | 5 | 15 | 83 |

=== Assists ===
As of 10 August 2020

This includes all competitive matches.

| Rnk | Pos | No. | Player | Superliga | Sydbank Pokalen | UEFA Champions League | UEFA Europa League | Total |
|---|---|---|---|---|---|---|---|---|
| 1 | MF | 7 | (Denmark) Viktor Fischer | 7 | 0 | 0 | 0 | 7 |
| 2 | DF | 3 | (Sweden) Pierre Bengtsson | 3 | 0 | 1 | 2 | 6 |
| 3 | FW | 11 | (Denmark) Mohamed Daramy | 4 | 0 | 0 | 0 | 4 |
| 3 | MF | 6 | (Denmark) Jens Stage | 2 | 1 | 0 | 1 | 4 |
| 3 | MF | 33 | (Denmark) Rasmus Falk | 2 | 0 | 0 | 2 | 4 |
| 6 | DF | 17 | (Croatia) Karlo Bartolec | 1 | 0 | 1 | 1 | 3 |
| 6 | FW | 14 | (Senegal) Dame N'Doye | 3 | 0 | 0 | 0 | 3 |
| 6 | MF | 10 | (Greece) (Portugal) Zeca | 2 | 1 | 0 | 0 | 3 |
| 6 | MF | 16 | (Spain) Pep Biel | 3 | 0 | 0 | 0 | 3 |
| 6 | DF | 2 | (Spain) (Uruguay) Guillermo Varela | 2 | 0 | 0 | 1 | 3 |
| 6 | FW | 23 | (Denmark) Jonas Wind | 2 | 0 | 0 | 1 | 3 |
| 12 | MF | 26 | (Denmark) Carlo Holse | 2 | 0 | 0 | 0 | 2 |
| 12 | DF | 19 | (Costa Rica) Bryan Oviedo | 1 | 1 | 0 | 0 | 2 |
| 14 | FW | 18 | (Uruguay) Michael Santos | 0 | 0 | 0 | 1 | 1 |
| 14 | FW | 9 | (Cyprus) Pieros Sotiriou | 0 | 1 | 0 | 0 | 1 |
| 14 | MF | 24 | (Croatia) Robert Mudražija | 1 | 0 | 0 | 0 | 1 |
| 14 | FW | 29 | (Denmark) Mikkel Kaufmann | 1 | 0 | 0 | 0 | 1 |
| 14 | DF | 5 | (Denmark) Andreas Bjelland | 1 | 0 | 0 | 0 | 1 |
| TOTALS | | | | 36 | 4 | 2 | 9 | 51 |

=== Clean Sheets ===
As of 10 August 2020

This includes all competitive matches.

| Rnk | Pos | No. | Player | Superliga | Sydbank Pokalen | UEFA Champions League | UEFA Europa League | Total |
|---|---|---|---|---|---|---|---|---|
| 1 | GK | 21 | (Sweden) Karl-Johan Johnsson | 7 | 0 | 1 | 3 | 11 |
| 2 | GK | 13 | (Norway) Sten Grytebust | 2 | 0 | 1 | 0 | 3 |
| TOTALS | | | | 8 | 0 | 2 | 3 | 13 |

=== Disciplinary record ===
As of 10 August 2020

This includes all competitive matches.

| Rnk | Pos. | No. | Player | Superliga | | Sydbank Pokalen | | UEFA Champions League | | UEFA Europa League | | Total | |
| Rnk | Pos. | No. | Player | Yellow card | Red card | Yellow card | Red card | Yellow card | Red card | Yellow card | Red card | Yellow card | Red card |
| 1 | MF | 10 | (Greece) (Portugal) Zeca | 6 | 0 | 0 | 0 | 1 | 0 | 4 | 0 | 11 | 0 |
| 2 | MF | 6 | (Denmark) Jens Stage | 7 | 0 | 0 | 0 | 0 | 0 | 3 | 0 | 10 | 0 |
| 3 | MF | 33 | (Denmark) Rasmus Falk | 4 | 1 | 2 | 1 | 0 | 0 | 1 | 0 | 7 | 2 |
| 4 | FW | 18 | (Uruguay) Michael Santos | 3 | 0 | 1 | 0 | 0 | 0 | 3 | 0 | 7 | 0 |
| 5 | DF | 25 | (Denmark) Victor Nelsson | 4 | 0 | 0 | 0 | 0 | 0 | 1 | 0 | 5 | 0 |
| 5 | FW | 14 | (Senegal) Dame N'Doye | 4 | 0 | 0 | 0 | 1 | 0 | 0 | 0 | 5 | 0 |
| 7 | DF | 2 | (Uruguay) Guillermo Varela | 3 | 0 | 0 | 0 | 1 | 0 | 0 | 0 | 4 | 0 |
| 7 | DF | 5 | (Denmark) Andreas Bjelland | 3 | 0 | 0 | 0 | 0 | 0 | 1 | 0 | 4 | 0 |
| 7 | MF | 8 | (Denmark) Nicolaj Thomsen | 2 | 0 | 1 | 0 | 0 | 0 | 1 | 0 | 4 | 0 |
| 7 | DF | 17 | (Croatia) Karlo Bartolec | 1 | 0 | 1 | 0 | 0 | 0 | 2 | 0 | 4 | 0 |
| 11 | MF | 16 | (Spain) Pep Biel | 0 | 0 | 0 | 0 | 2 | 1 | 0 | 0 | 2 | 1 |
| 11 | MF | 7 | (Denmark) Viktor Fischer | 1 | 0 | 0 | 0 | 0 | 0 | 2 | 0 | 3 | 0 |
| 11 | FW | 9 | (Cyprus) Pieros Sotiriou | 3 | 0 | 0 | 0 | 0 | 0 | 0 | 0 | 3 | 0 |
| 11 | DF | 19 | (Costa Rica) Bryan Oviedo | 2 | 0 | 0 | 0 | 0 | 0 | 2 | 0 | 3 | 0 |
| 11 | DF | 4 | (Sweden) Sotirios Papagiannopoulos | 1 | 0 | 0 | 0 | 0 | 0 | 2 | 0 | 3 | 0 |
| 16 | DF | 3 | (Sweden) Pierre Bengtsson | 2 | 0 | 0 | 0 | 0 | 0 | 0 | 0 | 2 | 0 |
| 16 | FW | 29 | (Denmark) Mikkel Kaufmann | 1 | 0 | 0 | 0 | 0 | 0 | 1 | 0 | 2 | 0 |
| 18 | GK | 13 | (Denmark) Sten Grytebust | 0 | 0 | 0 | 0 | 1 | 0 | 0 | 0 | 1 | 0 |
| 18 | MF | 26 | (Denmark) Carlo Holse | 1 | 0 | 0 | 0 | 0 | 0 | 0 | 0 | 1 | 0 |
| 18 | FW | 32 | (Denmark) Nicklas Bendtner | 1 | 0 | 0 | 0 | 0 | 0 | 0 | 0 | 1 | 0 |
| 18 | GK | 21 | (Sweden) Karl-Johan Johnsson | 1 | 0 | 0 | 0 | 0 | 0 | 0 | 0 | 1 | 0 |
| 18 | DF | 27 | (Iceland) Ragnar Sigurðsson | 0 | 0 | 0 | 0 | 0 | 0 | 1 | 0 | 1 | 0 |
| 18 | MF | 24 | (Croatia) Robert Mudražija | 1 | 0 | 0 | 0 | 0 | 0 | 0 | 0 | 1 | 0 |
| 18 | FW | 23 | (Denmark) Jonas Wind | 1 | 0 | 0 | 0 | 0 | 0 | 0 | 0 | 1 | 0 |
| TOTALS | | | | 52 | 1 | 5 | 1 | 6 | 1 | 22 | 0 | 86 | 3 |

== Awards ==
=== Team ===
| Award | Month | Source |

=== Individual ===
| No. | Player | Award | Month | Source |
|---|---|---|---|---|
| 23 | Jonas Wind | Player of the Month | July | www.superliga.dk |
| 23 | Jonas Wind | Team of the Month | July | www.superliga.dk |
| 7 | Viktor Fischer | Team of the Month | July | www.superliga.dk |
