= Michael Tørnes =

Danish footballer (born 1986)

Personal information
- Full name: Michael Elvers Tørnes
- Date of birth: 8 January 1986 (age 40)
- Place of birth: Herlev, Denmark
- Height: 1.87 m (6 ft 2 in)
- Position: Goalkeeper

Youth career
- Herlev
- Farum
- –2003: Lyngby

Senior career*
| Years | Team | Apps | (Gls) |
| 2003–2004 | Lyngby | ? | (?) |
| 2004–2005 | Brønshøj | 14 | (1) |
| 2005–2013 | Brøndby | 69 | (0) |
| 2013 | → Brønshøj (loan) | 6 | (0) |
| 2014–2015 | HJK Helsinki | 22 | (0) |
| 2015 | Sandefjord | 9 | (0) |
| 2015–2016 | OB | 4 | (0) |
| 2016–2018 | Vitesse | 2 | (0) |
| 2018–2019 | Vendsyssel | 6 | (0) |
| 2019–2021 | Brøndby | 0 | (0) |

International career
| 2001 | Denmark U16 | 3 | (0) |
| 2002–2003 | Denmark U17 | 6 | (0) |
| 2003–2004 | Denmark U18 | 5 | (0) |
| 2004 | Denmark U19 | 4 | (0) |
- * Club domestic league appearances and goals

Michael Elvers Tørnes (Danish: [ˈmiˌkʰɛˀl ˈelvɐs ˈtsʰɶɐ̯ˌnes]; born 8 January 1986) is a Danish former professional footballer who played as a goalkeeper.

== Club career ==
=== Brønshøj ===
Born in Herlev, Tørnes played for Herlev IF, Farum BK and Lyngby BK from a young age, Tørnes joined lower-league side Brønshøj BK preceding his release from Lyngby BK. After impressing at a young age, Tørnes made the move to Brøndby IF after a successful trial.

=== Brøndby ===
Tørnes had his debut for Brøndby IF in the 67th minute of a 0–0 draw against Flora Tallinn in the UEFA Cup, replacing goalkeeper Casper Ankergren who was sent off. Tørnes kept a clean sheet in the 4–0 second leg win on Brøndby Stadion, which he played for the whole 90 minutes. In the beginning of the 2010–11 season, Brøndby's first keeper Stephan Andersen, was long-term injured, resulting in Tørnes temporarily taking over his position.

=== Return to Brønshøj ===
Tørnes re-joined Brønshøj BK on loan for the start of the 2013–14 campaign, after failing to make an impression in the Brøndby IF side. On 28 July 2013, Tørnes made his Brønshøj BK return in a 4–1 defeat against Silkeborg IF.

=== HJK Helsinki ===
Tørnes joined Finnish side HJK on a free transfer after his release from Brøndby IF. During the 2014 season, Tørnes broke the clean sheet record for the Finnish Premier Division. Tørnes played 960 minutes consecutively without conceding a goal in either Finnish Premier Division matches or in Finnish Cup matches. Old record was 882 minutes by András Vilnrotter.

=== Sandefjord ===
After impressing in Finland, Tørnes joined Norwegian side Sandefjord on a free transfer after he rejected a new deal with HJK. On 19 April 2015, Tørnes made his Sandefjord debut in a 1–0 victory over Sarpsborg 08. Tørnes went on to appear in eight more league game before leaving on the expiry of his contract.

=== OB ===
On 13 August 2015, Tørnes returned to Denmark to join OB on a one-year deal to provide back up to Sten Grytebust and Maksym Koval. Although Tørnes was back up, he made his debut on the opening game of the season in a 3–2 defeat against Randers. Tørnes went on to make three more consecutive appearances and continually provided competition for the number 1 spot.

Tørnes was eventually released at the end of his contract on 30 June 2016.

=== Vitesse ===
On 27 July 2016, Tørnes joined Eredivisie side Vitesse on a two-year deal, after a successful pre-season trial. On 14 December 2016, Tørnes made his Vitesse debut in a KNVB Cup tie against Jodan Boys, in which Vitesse won 4–0. Tørnes was a member of the squad that went on to win the KNVB Cup, earning Vitesse their first major trophy in their 125-year history.

On 29 March 2018, it was announced that Tørnes would be leaving Vitesse at the end of his contract in June.

=== Vendsyssel FF ===
On 31 August 2018, Tørnes signed a one-year deal with newly promoted Vendsyssel FF, replacing the outgoing Frederik Ibsen.

=== Return to Brøndby ===
Tørnes returned to Danish Superliga club Brøndby IF on 3 June 2019 on a one-year contract to provide cover for Marvin Schwäbe. He signed a one-year extension on 23 July 2020, where he would provided cover for starter Schwäbe and new backup Mads Hermansen. He ended the 2020–21 season with a Superliga Winner's medal, as Brøndby won their first league title in 16 years.

He left the club after his contract expired in June 2021.

== Career statistics ==
As of match played 17 March 2019

| Club | Season | League | | | Cup | | Europe | | Other | | Total | |
| Club | Season | Division | Apps | Goals | Apps | Goals | Apps | Goals | Apps | Goals | Apps | Goals |
|---|---|---|---|---|---|---|---|---|---|---|---|---|
| Brøndby | 2008–09 | Superliga | 0 | 0 | 3 | 0 | 0 | 0 | — | | 3 | 0 |
| Brøndby | 2009–10 | Superliga | 2 | 0 | 2 | 0 | 0 | 0 | — | | 4 | 0 |
| Brøndby | 2010–11 | Superliga | 12 | 0 | 1 | 0 | 0 | 0 | — | | 13 | 0 |
| Brøndby | 2011–12 | Superliga | 29 | 0 | 1 | 0 | 0 | 0 | — | | 30 | 0 |
| Brøndby | 2012–13 | Superliga | 26 | 0 | 4 | 0 | — | | — | | 30 | 0 |
| Brønshøj (loan) | 2013–14 | 1st Division | 6 | 0 | 1 | 0 | — | | — | | 7 | 0 |
| HJK | 2014 | Veikkausliiga | 22 | 0 | 2 | 0 | — | | — | | 24 | 0 |
| HJK | 2015 | Veikkausliiga | 0 | 0 | 0 | 0 | 4 (Note: Appearance(s) in UEFA Champions League) | 0 | — | | 4 | 0 |
| Sandefjord | 2015 | Tippeligaen | 9 | 0 | 3 | 0 | — | | — | | 12 | 0 |
| OB | 2015–16 | Superliga | 4 | 0 | 1 | 0 | — | | — | | 5 | 0 |
| Vitesse | 2016–17 | Eredivisie | 2 | 0 | 1 | 0 | — | | — | | 3 | 0 |
| Vitesse | 2017–18 | Eredivisie | 0 | 0 | 0 | 0 | 0 | 0 | 0 | 0 | 0 | 0 |
| Vendsyssel | 2018–19 | Superliga | 6 | 0 | 1 | 0 | — | | — | | 7 | 0 |
| Brøndby | 2019–20 | Superliga | 0 | 0 | 0 | 0 | 0 | 0 | — | | 0 | 0 |
| Brøndby | 2020–21 | Superliga | 0 | 0 | 0 | 0 | — | | — | | 0 | 0 |
| Career total | | | 118 | 0 | 20 | 0 | 4 | 0 | 0 | 0 | 142 | 0 |

== Honours ==
HJK Helsinki

- Veikkausliiga: 2014
- Finnish Cup: 2014

Vitesse

- KNVB Cup: 2016–17

Brøndby

- Royal League: 2006–07
- Danish Superliga: 2020–21
