= Alexander Ludwig (disambiguation) =

Alexander Ludwig (born 1992) is a Canadian actor.

Alexander Ludwig may also refer to:

- Alexander Ludwig (footballer, born 1984), German footballer
- Alexander Ludwig (footballer, born 1993), Danish footballer
- Prince Alexander of Hesse and by Rhine (1823–1888), German prince whose birth name was Alexander Ludwig Georg Friedrich Emil of Hesse and by Rhine
