= Malte Kiilerich =

Danish footballer (born 1995)

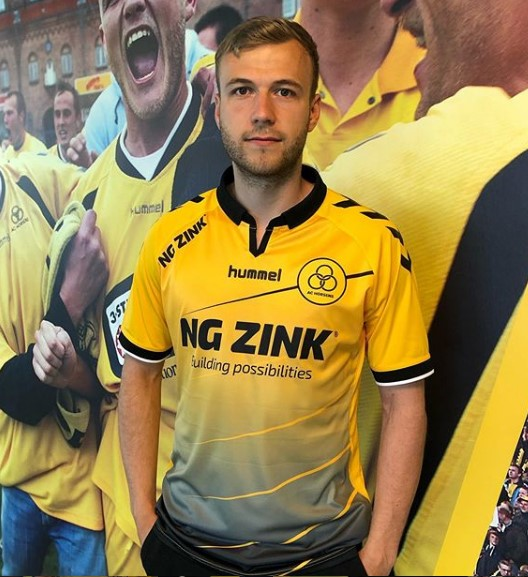
- Kiilerich with AC Horsens

Personal information
- Full name: Malte Kiilerich Hansen
- Date of birth: 16 October 1995 (age 31)
- Place of birth: Copenhagen, Denmark
- Height: 1.88 m (6 ft 2 in)
- Position: Centre-back

Team information
- Current team: Hvidovre
- Number: 25

Youth career
- B1908

Senior career*
Years	Team	Apps	(Gls)
2012–2015	Midtjylland	0	(0)
2015	→ Brønshøj (loan)	11	(0)
2015–2016	Brønshøj	?	(?)
2016–2019	Hvidovre	62	(6)
2019–2023	Horsens	124	(5)
2023–	Hvidovre	69	(2)
- * Club domestic league appearances and goals as of 2 June 2026

Malte Kiilerich Hansen (born 16 October 1995) is a Danish professional footballer who plays as a centre-back for Danish 1st Division club Hvidovre.

== Career ==
Kiilerich was born in Copenhagen and grew up on Amager, where he started playing football for B1908. In 2012, he joined Midtjylland's academy, before moving to second tier club Brønshøj on loan in February 2015. The loan then became a permanent deal in July 2015, after the club suffered relegation to the third tier at the end of the season.

On 12 July 2016, Kiilerich signed with Hvidovre. In June 2017, his contract was extended, followed by another extension in November 2017. The latter deal secured his position with the club until 2019, a testament to his development into a dependable starter at the centre-back position.

In January 2019, it was announced that Kiilerich would be joining Danish Superliga club AC Horsens from the 2019–20 season onward. He signed a three-year contract with Den Gule Fare. During his tenure, he established a robust defensive partnership alongside Alexander Ludwig, anchoring the center of defense. Their combined efforts resulted in both players amassing more than 100 appearances each for the club. The 2022–23 season proved challenging for Kiilerich and Horsens. The team struggled to maintain a clean sheet from October 2022 to June 2023, conceding a league-high 58 goals. Ultimately, their relegation occurred due to goal difference, narrowly missing out to Lyngby.

On 1 September 2023, Kiilerich made his return to Hvidovre, who had secured promotion to the Superliga in the interim.
