= Jonathan Harboe =

Danish footballer (born 2000)

Personal information
- Full name: Jonathan Harboe
- Date of birth: 24 May 2000 (age 26)
- Place of birth: Odense, Denmark
- Height: 1.79 m (5 ft 10 in)
- Position: Midfielder

Team information
- Current team: Gørslev
- Number: 17

Youth career
- Sanderum
- 2013–2018: OB

Senior career*
Years	Team	Apps	(Gls)
2018–2020	OB	2	(0)
2020-2021	SfB-Oure FA		
2021-	Næsby Boldklub		
- * Club domestic league appearances and goals as of 19:36, 22 May 2020 (UTC)

Jonathan Harboe (born 24 May 2000) is a Danish footballer who plays as a midfielder.

== Youth career ==
Harboe was raised in the small Danish club Sanderum located in Odense. In the age of 13, Harboe went to Odense Boldklub's youth academy.

== Club career ==
=== OB ===
On 24 May 2018, the day he turned 18, he signed his first professional contract. A three-year deal with Odense Boldklub. The club confirmed on 22 May 2020, that Harboe's contract had been terminated by mutual consent.
