= Karlo Bartolec =

Croatian footballer

Personal information
- Date of birth: 20 April 1995 (age 31)
- Place of birth: Zagreb, Croatia
- Height: 1.78 m (5 ft 10 in)
- Position: Right back

Team information
- Current team: Astana
- Number: 2

Youth career
- 2004–2007: Lokomotiva
- 2007–2013: Dinamo Zagreb

Senior career*
Years	Team	Apps	(Gls)
2014–2016	Lokomotiva	61	(0)
2016–2019	Nordsjælland	89	(7)
2019–2021	Copenhagen	41	(2)
2021–2023	Osijek	22	(1)
2023	Puskás Akadémia	13	(0)
2023–2024	Lokomotiva	27	(0)
2024–	Astana	64	(5)

International career^{‡}
2013	Croatia U19	5	(0)
2013–2017	Croatia U21	5	(0)
2018–2019	Croatia	5	(0)
- * Club domestic league appearances and goals as of 1 November 2026 ‡ National team caps and goals as of 17:41, 19 November 2019 (UTC)

Karlo Bartolec (Croatian pronunciation: [kâːrlo bǎrtolets]; born 20 April 1995) is a Croatian footballer who plays as a defender for Astana.

== Club career ==
On 15 March 2014, Bartolec made his professional debut against Rijeka in which he came as a 27th-minute substitute.

Bartolec was signed by Copenhagen on 1 July 2019 for 2.7M €.

On 23 January 2023, Bartolec signed a year-and-a-half-long contract with Puskás Akadémia in Hungary.

== International career ==
He made his debut for Croatia national football team on 15 October 2018 in a friendly against Jordan, as a starter. His final international was a November 2019 friendly against Georgia.

== Career statistics ==
=== Club ===
As of 10 August 2021

Club	Season	League			National Cup		Continental		Other		Total	
Club	Season	Division	Apps	Goals	Apps	Goals	Apps	Goals	Apps	Goals	Apps	Goals
Lokomotiva Zagreb	2013–14	Prva HNL	7	0	—		—		—		7	0
Lokomotiva Zagreb	2014–15	Prva HNL	25	0	3	0	—		—		28	0
Lokomotiva Zagreb	2015–16	Prva HNL	24	0	2	0	4	0	—		30	0
Lokomotiva Zagreb	2016–17	Prva HNL	5	0	—		8	0	—		13	0
Lokomotiva Zagreb	Total		61	0	5	0	12	0	—		78	0
Nordsjælland	2016–17	Danish Superliga	21	1	—		—		—		21	1
Nordsjælland	2017–18	Danish Superliga	34	4	1	0	—		—		35	4
Nordsjælland	2018–19	Danish Superliga	34	2	2	0	5	0	—		41	2
Nordsjælland	Total		89	7	3	0	5	0	—		97	7
Copenhagen	2019–20	Danish Superliga	24	1	3	0	14	0	—		41	1
Copenhagen	2020–21	Danish Superliga	17	1	1	0	1	0	—		19	1
Copenhagen	Total		41	2	4	0	15	0	—		60	2
Osijek	2021–22	Prva HNL	1	0	0	0	0	0	—		1	0
Career total			192	9	12	0	32	0	0	0	236	9
