= Sten Grytebust =

Norwegian footballer (born 1989)

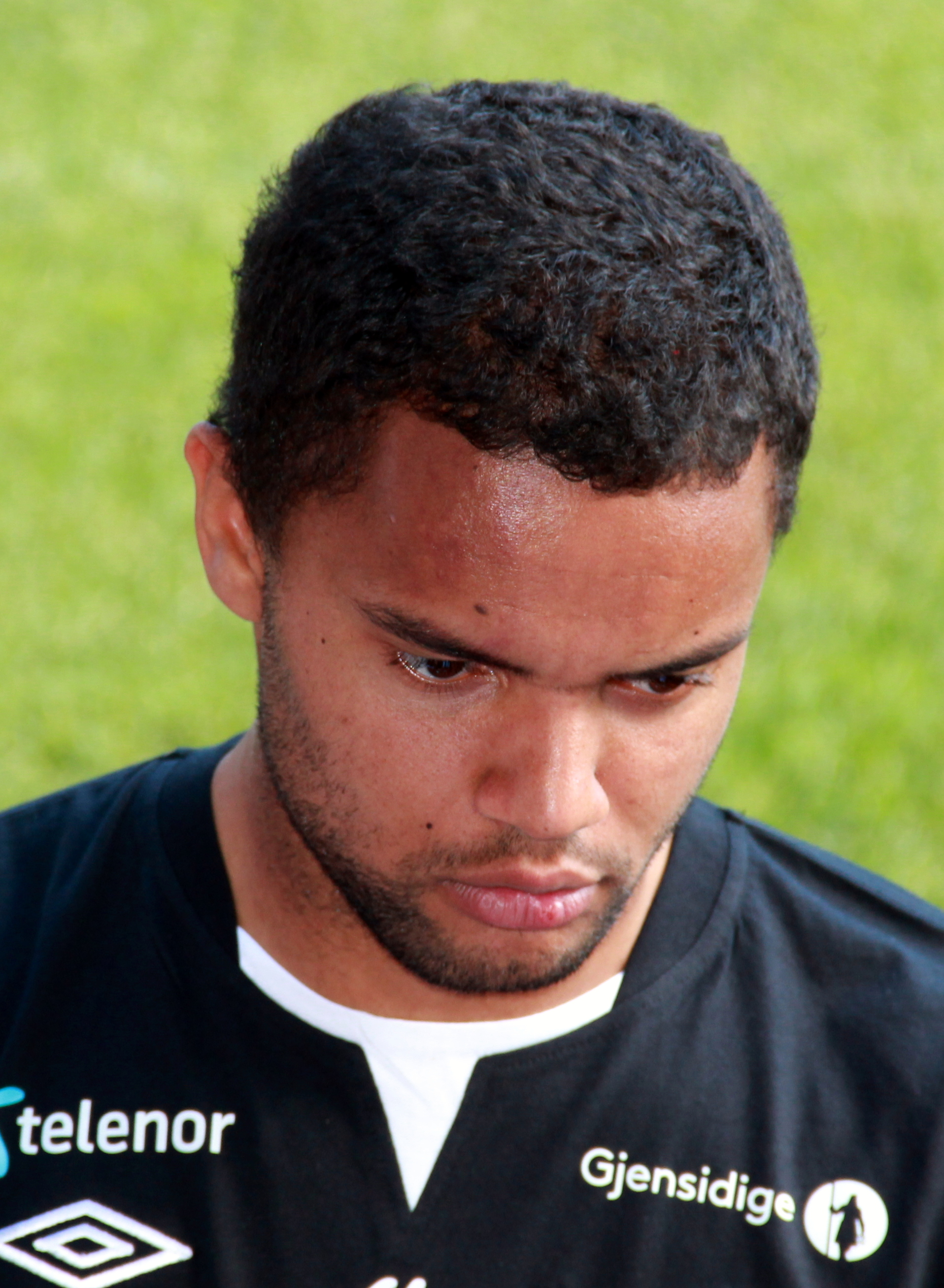
- Grytebust in 2013

Personal information
- Full name: Sten Michael Grytebust
- Date of birth: 25 October 1989 (age 37)
- Place of birth: Ålesund, Norway
- Height: 1.87 m (6 ft 2 in)
- Position: Goalkeeper

Youth career
- Ellingsøy IL

Senior career*
Years	Team	Apps	(Gls)
2009–2016	Aalesund	148	(0)
2016–2019	OB	114	(0)
2019–2022	Copenhagen	16	(0)
2021	→ Vejle (loan)	10	(0)
2022–2025	Aalesund	105	(0)

International career^{‡}
2006	Norway U17	2	(0)
2007	Norway U18	5	(0)
2008	Norway U19	1	(0)
2008–2010	Norway U21	3	(0)
2011-2013	Norway U23	2	(0)
2013–2022	Norway	5	(0)
- * Club domestic league appearances and goals as of 9 November 2025 ‡ National team caps and goals as of 7 November 2022

Sten Michael Grytebust (born 25 October 1989) is a Norwegian professional footballer who plays as a goalkeeper. After his contract with Aalesunds FK expired at the end of 2025, he has not signed with a new club and is currently clubless.

He previously played for Aalesunds FK in the Norwegian Tippeligaen and, until the end of the 2018–19 season, for Odense Boldklub in Denmark. He made his debut for the Norway national team in 2013.

== Early life ==
Born in Ålesund in western Norway, Grytebust was raised on the adjacent island of Ellingsøy. His father is a native of Ellingsøy and his mother is Liberian. Grytebust has described former Liberian international George Weah as his idol growing up.

Grytebust did not originally play as a goalkeeper, but as a teenager deputised in goal when his team's goalkeeper was injured. A good performance led to him becoming the first-choice goalkeeper for the side. In 2004, aged 15 he was approached by Aalesunds FK, but chose to play for Ellingsøy IL's first-team in the Norwegian fourth tier before joining Aalesund's youth team one year later. After two season in the youth setup, Grytebust joined Aalesund's first team ahead of the 2008 season.

== Club career ==
=== Aalesund ===
After joining Aalesund's first-team squad, the young Grytebust was the third-choice goalkeeper behind Adin Brown, Andreas Lie and later Anders Lindegaard who joined the side on loan. In August 2009, after Lindegaard's loan-spell ended the team's coaching staff decided to give Grytebust his first team debut in place of Lie. He made his debut against local rivals Molde FK on 22 August 2009, and delivered a good performance despite conceding three goals. After his debut, Aalesund signed Lindegaard permanently and Lie left the team, leaving Grytebust as the second-choice goalkeeper for the following season. He played in the two first rounds of the 2010 Norwegian Football Cup.

Grytebust was told by the club during autumn 2009 that he would be the next first-choice goalkeeper at the club. After the 2010 season, Lindegaard was bought by Manchester United and Grytebust was confirmed as the team's goalkeeper. Lindegaard stated that he believed Grytebust was ready for the task, and was certain that he would play for the Norwegian national side one day.

The 2011 season started poorly with Aalesund losing against Fredrikstad partly due to a bad goal kick by Grytebust, but after his match-winning saves against Viking and Stabæk, the team's head coach Kjetil Rekdal also predicted Grytebust would be the next national team goalkeeper. He delivered a stable performance throughout the season and was rewarded by being selected to the Under-23 national team together with his teammate Peter Orry Larsen, despite neither of them knowing that such a team existed. His performance also received praise from national team goalkeeping coach Frode Grodås who stated that Grytebust was "without weaknesses". After ending the season with a victory in the 2011 Norwegian Football Cup Final, Grytebust was named "Aalesund player of the year" by the local paper, Sunnmørsposten alongside Daniel Arnefjord.

The 2012 season continued with Grytebust unchallenged as first-choice goalkeeper for Aalesund. Results varied and he received criticism when Aalesund were eliminated from the domestic cup in the fourth round against Sandefjord, with Grytebust being sloppy with a pass and conceding a goal. Later, during a match against SK Brann, he was again careless with a goal-kick, which ended with another goal conceded. In August the club reported that it had re-signed Andreas Lie as a back-up keeper, with Lie stating that he was keen to "play for a permanent spot".

=== Move to Danish football ===
Grytebust left Aalesund in February 2016, joining Danish Superliga club Odense BK on a free transfer. He was voted Danish goalkeeper of the year in both 2017 and 2018 before joining FC København, again on a free transfer in May 2019, having opted not to sign a new contract at Odense. On 31 August 2021, Grytebust was loaned out to Vejle Boldklub for the 2021–22 season.

=== Return to Aalesund ===
On 15 February 2022, Grytebust returned to Aalesund on a two-year contract.

In December 2023, Aalesund announced that Grytebyst had extended his contract for an additional season, after the club got relegated from the Eliteserien the season prior.

== International career ==
Grytebust was first called up for the Norway national team in June 2013, and made his debut a friendly match against Macedonia on 11 June 2013 when he replaced André Hansen a couple of minutes before full-time. He became the 150th player Egil "Drillo" Olsen used during his two spells as national team coach.

== Career statistics ==
=== Club ===
As of match played 8 November 2025

Appearances and goals by club, season and competition
Club	Season	League			National Cup (Note: Including Norwegian Cup, Danish Cup)		Europe		Total	
Club	Season	Division	Apps	Goals	Apps	Goals	Apps	Goals	Apps	Goals
Aalesund	2009	Tippeligaen	1	0	0	0	–		1	0
Aalesund	2010	Tippeligaen	0	0	0	0	–		0	0
Aalesund	2011	Tippeligaen	30	0	5	0	6 (Note: Appearances in UEFA Europa League)	0	41	0
Aalesund	2012	Tippeligaen	30	0	1	0	4	0	35	0
Aalesund	2013	Tippeligaen	30	0	1	0	–		31	0
Aalesund	2014	Tippeligaen	30	0	4	0	–		34	0
Aalesund	2015	Tippeligaen	27	0	0	0	–		27	0
Aalesund	Total		148	0	11	0	10	0	169	0
OB	2015–16	Danish Superliga	15	0	0	0	–		15	0
OB	2016–17	Danish Superliga	30	0	0	0	–		30	0
OB	2017–18	Danish Superliga	34	0	1	0	–		35	0
OB	2018–19	Danish Superliga	35	0	3	0	–		38	0
OB	Total		114	0	4	0	–		118	0
Copenhagen	2019–20	Danish Superliga	7	0	2	0	5 (Note: Three appearances in UEFA Champions League, two appearances in the UEFA Europa League)	0	14	0
Copenhagen	2020–21	Danish Superliga	9	0	0	0	0	0	9	0
Copenhagen	Total		16	0	2	0	5	0	23	0
Vejle (loan)	2021–22	Danish Superliga	10	0	3	0	–		13	0
Vejle (loan)	Total		10	0	3	0	–		13	0
Aalesunds	2022	Eliteserien	30	0	1	0	–		31	0
Aalesunds	2023	Eliteserien	29	0	1	0	–		30	0
Aalesunds	2024	1. divisjon	17	0	2	0	–		19	0
Aalesunds	2025	1. divisjon	29	0	0	0	–		29	0
Aalesunds	Total		105	0	4	0	–		109	0
Career total			386	0	26	0	15	0	427	0

=== International ===
As of match played 7 June 2019

Appearances and goals by national team and year
National team	Year	Apps	Goals
Norway	2013	1	0
Norway	2014	1	0
Norway	2015	0	0
Norway	2016	0	0
Norway	2017	1	0
Norway	2018	1	0
Norway	2019	1	0
Norway	2020	0	0
Norway	2021	0	0
Total		5	0

== Honours ==
Aalesund

- Norwegian Football Cup: 2009, 2011
