= Frederik Ibsen =

Danish footballer (born 1997)

Personal information
- Full name: Frederik Ibsen
- Date of birth: 28 March 1997 (age 29)
- Place of birth: Copenhagen, Denmark
- Height: 1.86 m (6 ft 1 in)
- Position: Goalkeeper

Team information
- Current team: B.93
- Number: 31

Youth career
- Copenhagen

Senior career*
Years	Team	Apps	(Gls)
2017–2018	Vendsyssel	0	(0)
2018–2020	Copenhagen	1	(0)
2020–2021	Kolding	34	(0)
2021–2023	Lyngby	31	(0)
2023–2024	Helsingør	14	(0)
2024–	B.93	20	(0)
- * Club domestic league appearances and goals as of 3 October 2026

Frederik Ibsen (born 28 March 1997) is a Danish professional footballer who plays as a goalkeeper for B.93.

== Career ==
=== Vendsyssel ===
Ibsen came up through FC Copenhagen's youth ranks. Before getting his first team debut for the club, Ibsen went on a trial at Vendsyssel FF in July 2017. The trial went well and Ibsen signed with the club one week later on a two-year contract.

He was the second choice in his time at the club, playing only three games for the club in that season, which all was in the Danish Cup.

=== Return to Copenhagen ===
On 31 August 2018, FC Copenhagen announced, that Ibsen had returned to the club. Ibsen was the third choice at the club and got his official debut on 19 May 2019. Copenhagen was already champions, and therefore, manager Ståle Solbakken decided to rest first keeper, Jesse Joronen, while second keeper Stephan Andersen was injured. Copenhagen lost the game 4–3.

=== Kolding IF ===
On 24 January 2020, Danish 1st Division club Kolding IF confirmed that they had signed Ibsen on a contract until the summer 2021.

=== Lyngby ===
After one and a half years at Kolding, it was confirmed on 7 June 2021, that newly relegated Danish 1st Division club Lyngby Boldklub, had signed Ibsen on a two-year contract. Ibsen left Lyngby at the end of the 2022–23 season, as his contract wasn't renewed.

=== Helsingør ===
On 28 June 2023, Ibsen joined FC Helsingør on a deal until June 2025. Ibsen spent just over six months in Elsinore. After playing 14 out of 18 of the club's league games, Helsingør confirmed on 24 January 2024 that Ibsen's contract had been torn up by mutual agreement.

After leaving Helsingør, and half a year without a club, Ibsen tried out in July 2024 at the newly relegated Danish 1st Division club OB. Here, according to media reports, he was offered a contract, but reportedly chose to turn it down.

=== B.93 ===
On 13 August 2024 Ibsen moved to Danish 1st Division club B.93. The club did not write anything about how long a deal Ibsen got.

Despite having played only one match in the Danish Cup, B.93 confirmed on 17 July 2025 that Ibsen had extended his contract by another year, now running until June 2026.

== Career statistics ==
As of 27 August 2021

Appearances and goals by club, season and competition
Club	Season	League			Cup		Europe		Other		Total	
Club	Season	Division	Apps	Goals	Apps	Goals	Apps	Goals	Apps	Goals	Apps	Goals
Vendsyssel	2017–18	1st Division	0	0	3	0	—		—		3	0
Copenhagen	2018–19	Superliga	1	0	0	0	0	0	—		1	0
Copenhagen	2019–20	Superliga	0	0	0	0	0	0	—		0	0
Copenhagen	Total		1	0	0	0	0	0	—		1	0
Kolding	2019–20	1st Division	12	0	0	0	—		—		12	0
Kolding	2020–21	1st Division	22	0	0	0	—		—		22	0
Kolding	Total		34	0	0	0	—		—		34	0
Lyngby	2021–22	1st Division	6	0	1	0	—		—		7	0
Career total			41	0	4	0	0	0	0	0	45	0
