= Yuriy Yakovenko =

French-born Ukrainian footballer (born 1993)

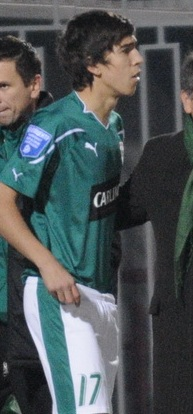
- Yakovenko in 2011

Personal information
- Full name: Yuriy Pavlovych Yakovenko
- Date of birth: 3 September 1993 (age 33)
- Place of birth: Montbéliard, France
- Height: 1.92 m (6 ft 4 in)
- Position: Forward

Youth career
- 2007–2010: Arsenal Kyiv
- 2010–2011: Obolon Kyiv

Senior career*
Years	Team	Apps	(Gls)
2011–2013	Obolon Kyiv	15	(1)
2012	→ Obolon-2 Kyiv	8	(1)
2013	Dnipro Dnipropetrovsk	0	(0)
2013–2014	Ajaccio	2	(0)
2014–2015	Anorthosis Famagusta	12	(4)
2017–2021	Esbjerg	96	(20)
2022	HamKam	12	(1)

International career^{‡}
2008–2009	Ukraine U16	15	(3)
2009–2010	Ukraine U17	11	(1)
2010	Ukraine U18	3	(0)
2011–2012	Ukraine U19	8	(0)
2012–2013	Ukraine U21	9	(4)
- * Club domestic league appearances and goals as of 30 September 2022 ‡ National team caps and goals as of 30 September 2022

Yuriy Yakovenko (Ukrainian: Юрій Павлович Яковенко; born 3 September 1993) is a Ukrainian professional footballer who plays as a forward.

== Career ==
Yakovenko is product of youth team systems of FC Arsenal Kyiv, but in July 2010 transferred to other Kyivan club Obolon. He made his debut for FC Obolon Kyiv entering as a substituted player in game against FC Chornomorets Odesa on 31 October 2011 in Ukrainian Premier League.

On 27 July 2017, Yakovenko signed with Danish club Esbjerg FB. On 9 July 2021 Esbjerg confirmed, that Yakovenko, alongside three teammates, had been removed from the first team and sent down to train with the U19s. It came in the wake of a riot between players from the squad and the club's new coach, Peter Hyballa. According to Danish media, the squad was very dissatisfied with the coach's methods, describing it as Hyballa was ... photographing players in underpants, punching the players, shaming them in front of their teammates, verbal torture and a training program so hard that the injuries was rolling in. After Hyballa decided to resign, Yakovenko was promoted to the first team squad again in mid-August. He left the club as a free agent as his contract expired in December 2021.

Yakovenko signed a one-year contract with recently promoted Eliteserien club HamKam on 24 February 2022.

== Personal life ==
He is the younger son of the former Ukrainian footballer and current coach Pavlo Yakovenko. His older brother Oleksandr Yakovenko is also a footballer.
