= Alexander Ludwig (footballer, born 1993) =

Danish footballer (born 1993)

Personal information
- Full name: Alexander Ludwig
- Date of birth: 30 June 1993 (age 33)
- Place of birth: Copenhagen, Denmark
- Height: 1.84 m (6 ft 0 in)
- Position: Centre-back

Team information
- Current team: Aarhus Fremad
- Number: 33

Youth career
- 1998–2005: Fremad Amager
- 2005–2008: Tårnby
- 2008–2009: Midtjylland

Senior career*
Years	Team	Apps	(Gls)
2010–2012	Midtjylland	1	(0)
2012–2014	Vendsyssel	57	(2)
2014–2017	HB Køge	91	(4)
2017–2018	Horsens	38	(3)
2018–2019	OB	28	(1)
2019–2026	Horsens	139	(3)
2026–	Aarhus Fremad	6	(1)
- * Club domestic league appearances and goals as of 3 September 2026

Alexander Ludwig (born 30 June 1993) is a Danish professional footballer who plays as a centre-back for Danish 1st Division club Aarhus Fremad.

After playing in the youth academies of various clubs in the Copenhagen area, Ludwig made his senior debut for FC Midtjylland in 2011. He would then go on to become a regular starter for Vendsyssel and HB Køge in the Danish 1st Division, the second tier of the Danish football league system, before returning to top-tier football at AC Horsens in 2017. Strong performances led to him being picked up by Odense Boldklub, but after a disappointing season where he was benched after suffering a knee injury halfway through the season, Ludwig returned to Horsens in August 2019.

== Career ==
=== Early career ===
Born in Copenhagen, Ludwig started his career in 1998 at Fremad Amager before moving to Tårnby Boldklub in 2005. At age 15, he was signed by FC Midtjylland and attached to their youth academy in Ikast. Ludwig made his senior debut on 30 April 2011, at age 17, in a Danish Superliga match against AaB, which Midtjylland lost 0–2.

=== Vendsyssel ===
Ludwig was signed by Vendsyssel FF in July 2012, which at that time still went under the name FC Hjørring.

After he had established himself as a starter for the club, Vendsyssel offered him a new contract in 2014, but Ludwig declined. As Ludwig's contract expired, clubs from the Superliga and Danish 1st Division were keen to sign him, but in the end he chose to sign with HB Køge, penning a three-year contract with the Danish second-tier club.

=== HB Køge ===
Ludwig made his debut for Køge in a 1–1 away draw against Skive IK on 25 July 2014. He scored his first goal for the club two months later, netting the 1–1 equalizer the 84th minute in a home match against Brønshøj, before Bruninho scored the winner for Køge four minutes later. Ludwig finished the season with 31 total appearances, in which he scored two goals.

Ludwig had a bad start to his 2015–16 season, suffering a knee injury in the season debut against Lyngby Boldklub on 30 July 2015 which kept him out for two months. He made his return to the starting eleven on 27 September, helping Køge advance in Danish Cup by scoring in a 2–0 win over AC Horsens. In the following league match Ludwig was in the starting eleven again and contributed to keeping another clean sheet as his club drew 0–0 away against FC Fredericia on 27 September.

On 29 November 2016, Ludwig was named Player of the Year for HB Køge after making 36 appearances and keeping 15 clean sheets throughout 2016.

=== Horsens ===
On 8 June 2016, Ludwig signed a two-year contract with Danish Superliga club AC Horsens, after their head coach Bo Henriksen had referred to him as his "dream player". He made his debut on 14 July, playing the full match in a 2–1 away win over rivals AGF, marking his return to Danish top-tier football since his sole appearance for Midtjylland in 2011. Ludwig would have a strong season in the centre of defense alongside Bubacarr Sanneh, helping an overperforming Horsens-team reach the championship round where they eventually ended sixth in the league table. He capped off his season with 38 total appearances in which he scored three goals.

=== OB ===
On 12 June 2018, Ludwig signed a four-year deal with OB. He made his debut for the club on 15 July against newly promoted Vendsyssel FF, his former club, which ended in a disappointing 3–2 loss away at Nord Energi Arena. After a challenging first half of the season, where he was in and out of the starting lineup, Ludwig suffered a tear in the posterior cruciate ligament of his knee, which kept him out for some months. He made his return to the pitch in a 2–1 win over AGF in March, but would increasingly appear as a substitute for OB, especially into the next season.

=== Return to AC Horsens ===
On 14 August 2019, AC Horsens announced that Ludwig had returned to the club on a four-year contract, as a replacement for the outgoing defender Sivert Heltne Nilsen. He made his return to the pitch for Horsens on 19 August, five days after signing, in a 2–0 away loss to AGF on Aarhus Stadium, where he started in the centre of defense next to Malte Kiilerich. On 3 June 2020, Ludwig was voted into the "Team of the Week" of the Danish Superliga, after stringing together some strong performances in a rejuvenated Horsens-defense, beating league leader FC Midtjylland 1–0.

In summer 2026, AC Horsens announced that Ludwig will leave the club.

=== Aarhus Fremad ===
On 23 June 2026, Aarhus Fremad announced the signing of Ludwig.
