= Denmark at the 2010 Summer Youth Olympics =

- IOC code: DEN
- NOC: Denmark Olympic Committee
- Website: www.dif.dk

in Singapore
- Competitors: 30 in 11 sports
- Flag bearer: Signe Pedersen
- Medals Ranked 42nd: Gold 1 Silver 1 Bronze 1 Total 3

Summer Youth Olympics appearances
- 2010; 2014; 2018

Denmark participated in the 2010 Summer Youth Olympics in Singapore.

Thirty Danish athletes competed in eleven sports: archery, athletics, badminton, canoeing, cycling, fencing, handball, judo, rowing, sailing and tennis.

== Medalists ==
Medal	Name	Sport	Event	Date
Gold	Denmark Handball Team: Anne-Sofie Ernstrøm; Mathilde Juncker; Camilla Fangel; Rikke Iversen; Mathilde Bjerregaard; Rikke Ebbesen; Signe Pedersen; Sara Smidemann; Amanda Engelhardt Brogaard; Cecilie Woller; Julie Parkhøi; Nicoline Skals; Pernille Clausen; Camilla Madsen	Handball	Girls' tournament	25 Aug
Silver	Stina Troest	Athletics	400 metres hurdles	23 Aug
Bronze	Phuc Cai	Judo	Boys' 66 kg	21 Aug

== Archery ==
Boys

Athlete	Events	Ranking round		Round of 32	Round of 16	Quarterfinals	Semifinals	Final	
Athlete	Events	Score	Seed	Opposition Score	Opposition Score	Opposition Score	Opposition Score	Opposition Score	Rank
Benjamin Hindborg Ipsen	Individual	577	24	Nott (AUS); L 4–6 (24–24 27–25 18–27 19–27 24–24)	Did not advance				=17

Girls

Athlete	Events	Ranking round		Round of 32	Round of 16	Quarterfinals	Semifinals	Final	
Athlete	Events	Score	Seed	Opposition Score	Opposition Score	Opposition Score	Opposition Score	Opposition Score	Rank
Nynne Sophie Holdt-Caspersen	Individual	602	13	Alarcón (ESP); L 2–6 (19–25 22–27 28–25 25–26)	Did not advance				=17

Mixed team

Athlete	Partner	Round of 32	Round of 16	Quarterfinals	Semifinals	Final	
Athlete	Partner	Opposition Score	Opposition Score	Opposition Score	Opposition Score	Opposition Score	Rank
Benjamin Hindborg Ipsen	Alexandra Mirca (MDA)	Shirian (IRI)/ Sabry (EGY); W 6–5 (29–35 36–33 32–37 34–31 36–36 18–16 shoot-off)	Karoukin (BLR)/ Filippi (ITA); L 4–6 (31–32 36–33 34–33 35–37 36–37)	Did not advance			=9
Nynne Sophie Holdt-Caspersen	Julien Rossignol (FRA)	Tan (TPE)/ Harikul (THA); W 6–4 (32–33 32–34 38–36 36–34 35–34)	Unsal (TUR)/ Jaffar (SIN); L 2–6 (32–34 34–35 36–33 32–34)	Did not advance			=9

== Athletics ==
=== Boys ===
Field events

Athlete	Events	Qualification		Final	
Athlete	Events	Result	Rank	Result	Rank
Andreas Trajkovski	Boys' long jump	7.56 m PB	2 Q	7.33 m	5

=== Girls ===
Track and road events

Athlete	Events	Qualification		Final	
Athlete	Events	Result	Rank	Result	Rank
Stina Troest	Girls' 400m hurdles	59.35 s NyR	2 (h2) Q	58.88 s NyR	2nd place, silver medalist(s)

== Badminton ==
Boys

Athlete	Event	Group stage				Knock-out stage			
Athlete	Event	Match 1	Match 2	Match 3	Rank	Quarterfinal	Semifinal	Final	Rank
Flemming Quach	Boys' singles	Westerbäck (SWE) W 2-0 (22-20, 21-9)	Poodchalat (THA) L 0-2 (18-21, 15-21)	Qaddoum (JOR) W 2-0 (21-8, 21-13)	2	Did not advance			

Girls

Athlete	Event	Group stage				Knock-out stage			
Athlete	Event	Match 1	Match 2	Match 3	Rank	Quarterfinal	Semifinal	Final	Rank
Lene Clausen	Girls' singles	Rasheed (MDV) W 2-0 (21-2, 21-2)	Bangi (UGA) W 2-0 (21-8, 21-7)	Deprez (GER) W 2-1 (20-22, 21-18, 21-9)	1 Q	Vu (VIE) L 0-2 (19-21, 13-21)	Did not advance		=5

== Canoeing ==
Girls

Athlete	Event	Time trial		Round 1	Round 2 (Rep)	Round 3	Round 4	Round 5	Final
Athlete	Event	Time	Rank	Round 1	Round 2 (Rep)	Round 3	Round 4	Round 5	Final
Ida Villumsen	Girls' K1 slalom	1:56.17	12	Podolskaya (RUS); L 2:00.81-1:52.23	Barrera (ARG); W 1:53.86-2:04.45	Novak (SLO); L 1:54.23-1:38.23	Did not advance		
Ida Villumsen	Girls' K1 sprint	1:47.22	12	Kichasova (UKR); L 1:48.65-1:46.75	Ceita (STP); W 1:47.31-2:15.21	Monleon (ESP); L 1:48.40-1:45.95	Did not advance		

Note: In sprint repechages, the fastest 6 boats out of 10 qualified. In slalom repechages, the fastest 3 out of 10 boats qualified.

== Cycling ==
Mixed team

Athlete	Cross-country			Time trial			BMX																			Road race			Total	
Athlete	Result	Rank	Pts	Result	Rank	Pts	Seeding round		Quarterfinals							Semifinals							Final			Result	Rank	Pts	Pts	Rank
Athlete	Result	Rank	Pts	Result	Rank	Pts	Seeding round		Run 1		Run 2		Run 3		Rank	Run 1		Run 2		Run 3		Rank	Final			Result	Rank	Pts	Pts	Rank
Athlete	Result	Rank	Pts	Result	Rank	Pts	Time	Rank	Time	Rank	Time	Rank	Time	Rank	Rank	Time	Rank	Time	Rank	Time	Rank	Rank	Time	Rank	Pts	Result	Rank	Pts	Pts	Rank
Mette Jepsen	−2 LAPS	27	40	3:52.13 (+34.13)	26	40	37.905 (+1.312)	5	37.550 (+0.097)	2	38.057 (+0.114)	2	38.129 (+0.652)	2	2 Q	38.716 (+1.898)	3	37.797 (+0.527)	2	38.258 (+0.219)	2	2 Q	37.143 (+1.445)	5	15	—N/a			—N/a	
Magnus Cort	1:01:44 (+3:02)	8	45	—N/a			—N/a																			1:19:44 (+14:02)	76	—N/a	—N/a	
Michael Valgren	—N/a			4:00.40 (+3.76)	3	7	—N/a																			1:05:44 (+0:02)	50	72	—N/a	
Niklas Laustsen	—N/a			—N/a			31.517 (+0.316)	2	36.196	1	32.445	1	31.823	1	1 Q	31.662	1	32.470	1	31.933	1	1 Q	31.743 (+0.778)	3	17	1:19:44 (+14:02)	76	—N/a	—N/a	
Denmark	—N/a		85	—N/a		47	—N/a																		32	—N/a		67*	231	7

*Denmark awarded −5 points for finishing with all three riders

== Fencing ==
Boys

Athlete	Event	Group phase							Round of 16	Quarterfinals	Semifinals	Finals	
Athlete	Event	Match 1	Match 2	Match 3	Match 4	Match 5	Match 6	Rank	Round of 16	Quarterfinals	Semifinals	Finals	
Athlete	Event	Opposition Result	Opposition Result	Opposition Result	Opposition Result	Opposition Result	Opposition Result	Rank	Opposition Result	Opposition Result	Opposition Result	Opposition Result	Rank
Alexandros Boeskov-Tsoronis	Foil (Pool 1)	Massialas (USA); L 2–5	Babaoglu (TUR); L 1–5	Choupenitch (CZE); L 3–5	Rosabal (CUB); L 3–5	Choi (HKG); L 4–5	Ong (SIN); W 5–1	6	Choi (HKG); W 15–9	Babaoglu (TUR); L 9–15	Did not advance		8

== Handball ==
Girls

Squad list	Group phase (Group B)			Semifinals	Finals	
Squad list	Match 1	Match 2	Rank	Semifinals	Finals	
Squad list	Opposition Score	Opposition Score	Rank	Opposition Score	Opposition Score	Rank
Goalkeepers: Anne Sofie Ernstrøm, Mathilde Juncker; Pivots: Camilla Fangel, Rikke Iversen; Left wings: Mathilde Bjerregaard, Rikke Ebbesen; Left backs: Signe Pedersen, Sara Smidemann; Centre backs: Amanda Engelhardt Brogaard, Cecilie Woller; Right back: Julie Parkhøi, Camilla Madsen; Right wings: Nicoline Skals, Pernille Clausen	Australia (AUS); W 41–4	Kazakhstan (KAZ); W 40–15	1 Q	Brazil (BRA); W 30–25	Russia (RUS); W 28–26	1st place, gold medalist(s)

== Judo ==
Boys

Athlete	Event	First round	Second round	Third round	Fourth round	Bracket finals	Medal contests	
Athlete	Event	Opposition Result	Opposition Result	Opposition Result	Opposition Result	Opposition Result	Opposition Result	Rank
Phuc Cai	Boys' -66 kg	BYE	Davit Ghazaryan (ARM); L 011–021	Repechage: Jeremy Saywell (MLT); W 101–000	Repechage: Jalil Jalilov (AZE); W 010–000	Repechage: Farshid Ghasemi Asl (IRI); W 100–000	Bronze: Dulguun Otgonbayar (MGL); W 100–001	3rd place, bronze medalist(s)

Team

Team	Event	Round 1	Round 2	Semifinals	Final	Rank
Team	Event	Opposition Result	Opposition Result	Opposition Result	Opposition Result	Rank
Chiba; Dieulourdes Joseph (HAI); Diau Bauro (FIJ); Alexandra Pop (ROU); Phuc Cai (DEN); Sophio Beridze (GEO); Rijad Dedeic (MNE); Ryosuke Igarashi (JPN)	Mixed team	BYE	Essen; L 2-5	Did not advance		5

== Rowing ==
Boys

Athlete	Event	Heats		Repechages		Semifinals		Finals	
Athlete	Event	Result	Rank	Result	Rank	Result	Rank	Result	Rank
Simon Sørensen	Single sculls	3:41.55 (+14.01)	5 R	3:45.69 (+12.55)	3 SC/D	Semifinal C/D 1: 3:48.80 (+5.80)	4 FD	Final D: 3:51.77	19

== Sailing ==
Girls

Athlete	Event	Race (ranks/pts)															Medal race	Net pts	Rank
Athlete	Event	1	2	3	4	5	6	7	8	9	10	11	12	13	14	15	Medal race	Net pts	Rank
Celine Carlsen	Girls' Byte CII	7	9	1	13	2	2	~~14~~	4	~~16~~	9	6	Cancelled				5	58	4

== Tennis ==
Athlete	Event	First round	Round of 16	Quarterfinals	Semifinals	Finals	
Athlete	Event	Opposition Score	Opposition Score	Opposition Score	Opposition Score	Opposition Score	Rank
Mai Grage	Singles	Paliivets (CAN); W 6–4 6–4	(7) Čepelová (SVK); L 6–3 (1)6–7 4–6	Did not advance			
Mai Grage (with Ilona Kremen (BLR))	Doubles	—N/a	Jodoin (CAN)/ Paliivets (CAN); W 6–1 7–6(4)	(4) Čepelová (SVK)/ Škamlová (SVK); L 4–6 3–6	Did not advance		
