= 2018–19 Brøndby IF season =

Brøndby IF
2018–19 season
- Chairman: Jan Bech Andersen
- Head coach: Alexander Zorniger (until 18 February); Martin Retov (from 19 February as caretaker)
- Stadium: Brøndby Stadium
- Danish Superliga: 4th
- Danish Cup: Runners-up
- UEFA Europa League: Play-off round
- Top goalscorer: League: Kamil Wilczek (22 goals); All: Kamil Wilczek (27 goals)
- Highest home attendance: 20,731 (v Copenhagen, 4 November 2018)
- Lowest home attendance: 7,468 (v Midtjylland, 20 May 2019)
- Average home league attendance: 13,726
Home colours	Away colours	Third colours

The 2018–19 season was Brøndbyernes Idrætsforening's 38th consecutive season in top-division of the Danish football league, the 29th consecutive in Danish Superliga, and the 53rd as a football club. In addition to the Superliga, Brøndby participated in the Danish Cup and the UEFA Europa League. This marked the third season under head coach Alexander Zorniger, who was dismissed halfway through the season.

A disappointing Danish Superliga campaign saw the club finish in fourth place. Brøndby were also eliminated early in the UEFA Europa League, losing 9–4 on aggregate in the qualifying round to Belgian club Genk. They fared better in the domestic cup, but ultimately lost on penalties in the final to Midtjylland. Brøndby qualified for the 2019–20 UEFA Europa League after Randers in the play-off for Europe.

On 18 February 2019, after questions about his management style and a series of disappointing results, head coach Alexander Zorniger was sacked. His last game, the previous day, ended in a 2–1 defeat to Esbjerg fB. The following day, former Brøndby midfielder and Zorniger's assistant coach, Martin Retov, was appointed as caretaker manager until the end of the season, assisted by fellow former assistant Matthias Jaissle. Brøndby's chairman Jan Bech Andersen later said about Zorniger's dismissal, "If you can no longer change yourself and feel that you are compromising too much on your own way of leading people, it will end up in a bad place anyway."

== Pre-season and friendlies ==
Brøndby played a series of friendlies to prepare for the new season, defeating Herstedøster IC and Ledøje-Smørum Fodbold 6–0 and 6–1, respectively, in mid-June. The team then traveled to Austria for a training camp, where they lost 3–2 to Ukraine's Shakhtar Donetsk on 26 June and drew 3–3 against CSKA Sofia a week later. After returning to Denmark, Brøndby won their final pre-season friendly against 2. Bundesliga side FC St. Pauli 3–0.

Date	Opponents	Venue	Result (Note: Brøndby IF's score written first)	Scorers	Attendance
17 June 2018	Herstedøster IC	A	6–0	Uhre (2) 30', 37', Nørgaard '45, Bruus (2) '52, '69', Crone 63'	2,000
22 June 2018	Ledøje-Smørum	A	6–1	Erceg 12', Nørgaard '35, Fisker '45, Wilczek (2) 71', 76', Vigen '85	1,300
26 June 2018	Shakhtar Donetsk	A	2–3	Fisker 50', Frendrup '65	0
2 July 2019	CSKA Sofia	A	3–3	Erceg '28, Frendrup '46	0
8 July 2018	FC St. Pauli	H	3–0	Erceg '18, Kaiser '42, Wilczek 90+1'	6,106

== Competitions ==
=== Overall record ===
Competition	First match	Last match	Starting round	Final position	Record							
Competition	First match	Last match	Starting round	Final position	Pld	W	D	L	GF	GA	GD	Win %
Danish Superliga	16 July 2018	25 May 2019	Matchday 1	Fourth place	36	15	7	14	60	52	+8	41.67
European play-off	31 May 2019	31 May 2019	European play-off	Winner	1	1	0	0	4	2	+2	100.00
Danish Cup	27 September 2018	17 May 2019	Final	Runners-up	5	4	1	0	12	3	+9	80.00
UEFA Europa League	9 August 2018	30 August 2018	Third qualifying round	Play-off round	4	2	0	2	8	10	−2	50.00
Total					46	22	8	16	84	67	+17	47.83

Source: Soccerway

=== Results summary ===
Overall								Home						Away					
Pld	W	D	L	GF	GA	GD	Pts	W	D	L	GF	GA	GD	W	D	L	GF	GA	GD
36	15	7	14	60	52	+8	52	6	5	7	28	25	+3	9	2	7	32	27	+5

Source: SuperStats

== Danish Superliga ==
=== August–December ===
The 2018–19 Danish Superliga fixtures were released on 4 June 2018. Brøndby played 26 matches during the regular season from 16 July 2018 to 17 March 2019.

Brøndby's first Danish Superliga game of the season was away at Randers on 16 July; Schwäbe, Kaiser, Erceg, Uhre, and Kopplin all made their debuts. Brøndby won the game 2–0 after goals from Erceg and substitute Kamil Wilczek. The team started the season strongly, securing 10 points from their first four matches. However, their momentum was halted by a 3–1 defeat in the Copenhagen Derby against Copenhagen in the fifth fixture of the season, which ended Brøndby's unbeaten streak against their rivals from the previous season.

Following the derby loss, Brøndby entered a difficult phase in the league. Over the next ten matches, the team struggled, managing only two wins, two draws, and six losses. This poor run of form saw Brøndby drop to a disappointing eighth place in the standings, with a seven-point gap to third-placed Esbjerg fB.

Despite these challenges, Brøndby managed to turn their season around just before the winter break. The team secured four consecutive victories, which significantly improved their position in the league. After a 2–1 win over Vejle in matchday 19, Brøndby climbed to third place, three points ahead of OB. Although their final match before the winter break resulted in a disappointing home defeat to Vendsyssel, Brøndby entered the break in a much stronger position than earlier in the autumn.

=== January–March ===
In September 2018, director of football Troels Bech had announced he would be stepping down from his position Brøndby. The club appointed former player Ebbe Sand as his replacement, bringing experience from football management in Germany.

During the winter transfer window, Uffe Bech, Larsson, and Kopplin left the club, while Simon Hedlund joined from Union Berlin. Youth players Mads Hermansen, Jesper Lindstrøm, Anton Skipper, and Peter Bjur were promoted to the first team.

After a slow start to the spring season, with a draw against Nordsjælland and a loss to Esbjerg, popular head coach Alexander Zorniger departed. Assistant coach Martin Retov was promoted to lead the team, with Matthias Jaissle as his assistant. Their goal was to secure European qualification, through first and foremost securing top-six and a place in the championship round. Brøndby, in fourth place, needed results to stay ahead of AGF and OB. After mixed results in three matches, their place in the top six depended on the final game against Horsens. Despite falling behind early, Brøndby won 3–1, securing their spot in the championship round and a chance to compete for a top-three finish.

Upon securing their spot in top-six, Retov commented, "We've reached our first goal of making the top six, and now we aim for a top-three finish. We also look forward to the Danish Cup semifinal against AaB."

=== Match details ===
Win	Draw	Loss

Matchday	Date	Opponents	Venue	Result	Scorers	Attendance	League position
1	16 July 2018	Randers	A	2–0	Erceg 30', Wilczek 63'	6,437	2nd
2	22 July 2018	Vejle	H	1–1	Wilczek 45'	18,785	4th
3	29 July 2018	Hobro	A	2–1	Larsson 59', Uhre 90+4'	4,168	1st
4	5 August 2018	Nordsjælland	H	2–0	Wilczek 38', Erceg, 90'	19,225	1st
5	12 August 2018	Copenhagen	A	1–3	Erceg, 51'	27,248	4th
6	19 August 2018	Esbjerg	H	0–1		13,743	4th
7	26 August 2018	Vendsyssel	A	2–1	Wilczek (2) 42', 68'	5,161	3rd
8	2 September 2018	Midtjylland	H	2–2	Mukhtar 19', Laursen 59'	14,211	3rd
9	16 September 2018	SønderjyskE	H	2–4	Wilczek 14', Mukhtar 21'	16,501	4th
10	23 September 2018	AGF	A	2–3	Wilczek (2) 29', 57'	15,418	5th
11	30 September 2018	Horsens	H	1–2	Wilczek 15'	11,626	8th
12	7 October 2018	AaB	A	3–1	Wilczek 45+2', Mukhtar 48', Vigen 67'	8,629	6th
13	22 October 2018	OB	H	1–1	Mukhtar 82'	12,185	7th
14	29 October 2018	Midtjylland	A	2–3	Bech 4', Larsson 31'	10,106	7th
15	4 November 2018	Copenhagen	H	0–1		20,731	8th
16	9 November 2018	AGF	H	2–0	Kaiser 68', Wilczek '87 (pen.)	12,452	6th
17	25 November 2018	SønderjyskE	A	2–0	Mukhtar 7', Wilczek 78'	6,235	5th
18	2 December 2018	Hobro	H	1–0	Tibbling '44	8,512	4th
19	9 December 2018	Vejle	A	2–1	Wilczek 48', Uhre 59'	6,994	3rd
20	16 December 2018	Vendsyssel	H	2–3	Bech '41, Tibbling '53	11,781	3rd
21	10 February 2019	Nordsjælland	A	3–3	Halimi '29 (pen.), Uhre '55, Radošević '85 (pen.)	6,658	3rd
22	17 February 2019	Esbjerg	A	1–2	Röcker '86	7,016	4th
23	24 February 2019	Randers	H	2–1	Mukhtar '38, Wilczek '85 (pen.)	12,472	3rd
24	3 March 2019	OB	A	0–2		11,166	5th
25	10 March 2019	Nordsjælland	H	3–3	Wilczek (2) '28 (pen.), 46', Erceg '60	14,152	4th
26	17 March 2019	Horsens	A	3–1	Radošević '36, Wilczek (2) 40', 72'	5,017	4th

=== Partial league table ===
Regular season
Pos	Team	Pld	W	D	L	GF	GA	GD	Pts	Qualification
2	Midtjylland	26	18	6	2	62	26	+36	60	Qualification for the Championship round
3	OB	26	12	6	8	35	31	+4	42	Qualification for the Championship round
4	Brøndby	26	11	5	10	44	40	+4	38	Qualification for the Championship round
5	Esbjerg	26	11	5	10	32	35	−3	38	Qualification for the Championship round
6	Nordsjælland	26	9	9	8	42	39	+3	36	Qualification for the Championship round

Source: Danish Football Association (in Danish), Soccerway
Rules for classification: 1) Points; 2) Goal difference; 3) Goals scored; 4) Away goals scored; 5) Play-off (played on neutral ground if determining teams for different rounds); 6) Draw.

Results by matchday
Matchday	1	2	3	4	5	6	7	8	9	10	11	12	13	14	15	16	17	18	19	20	21	22	23	24	25	26
Ground	A	H	A	H	A	H	A	H	H	A	H	A	H	A	H	H	A	H	A	H	A	A	H	A	H	A
Result	W	D	W	W	L	L	W	D	L	L	L	W	D	L	L	W	W	W	W	L	D	L	W	L	D	W
Position	2	4	1	1	4	4	3	3	4	5	8	6	7	7	8	6	5	4	3	3	3	4	3	5	4	4

Source: SuperStats
A = Away; H = Home; W = Win; D = Draw; L = Loss
Notes:
- Positions show the situation at the end of the corresponding Game Weeks (GW), not the position at the conclusion of matches or game days.

=== Championship round ===
The 2019 Danish Superliga championship round began on 29 March and featured the top six teams from the regular season. Points and goals from the regular season were carried over in full. Each team played 10 matches, facing the others both home and away. The team with the most points at the end was crowned champion and qualified for the UEFA Champions League, while the remaining positions determined qualification for other European competitions.

Brøndby had a challenging start to the 2019 championship round, earning just two points from their first four matches. With six games remaining and a four-point deficit to OB in the race for European qualification, their prospects in the league looked uncertain. Brøndby faced Midtjylland away on the 31st matchday, a match seen as a rehearsal for the upcoming Danish Cup final. Despite a strong record against Midtjylland, Brøndby fell behind early but rallied to win 2–1 with goals from Simon Hedlund and Jens Martin Gammelby, ending their four-game winless run, and adding three vital points to their tally. Brøndby then lost another two games, against Esbjerg fB and rivals Copenhagen before bouncing back with a win over Nordsjælland.

By this point, Brøndby was in sixth place, five points behind OB. To secure European qualification, they needed to win their final two league matches—a home game against Midtjylland and an away match against OB—while hoping OB would drop points. OB's draw with Nordsjælland kept Brøndby's hopes alive, and a convincing 4–1 home victory over Midtjylland set up a decisive final match in Odense. Brøndby secured a 2–0 win in a tense encounter, completing their late-season surge. Kamil Wilczek played a crucial role in Brøndby's final push, scoring three goals in the last two games and finishing the season with 21 league goals. With this achievement, he became the first Brøndby player to score more than 20 goals in a season since 2002.

==== Match details ====
Matchday	Date	Opponents	Venue	Result	Scorers	Attendance	League position
27	29 March 2019	OB	H	2–2	Hedlund 42', Tibbling '73	11,679	4th
28	8 April 2019	Nordsjælland	A	1–1	Uhre 90+1'	5,886	4th
29	14 April 2019	Copenhagen	H	1–2	Hedlund 9'	19,086	5th
30	18 April 2019	Esbjerg	A	0–1		9,511	5th
31	22 April 2019	Midtjylland	A	2–1	Hedlund 12', Gammelby '75	10,124	5th
32	28 April 2019	Esbjerg	H	0–1		13,177	5th
33	5 May 2019	Copenhagen	A	2–3	Tibbling 6', Vavro 53' (o.g.)	33,134	5th
34	13 May 2019	Nordsjælland	H	2–0	Uhre 30', Kaiser 35'	9,291	4th
35	20 May 2019	Midtjylland	H	4–1	Wilczek (2) 38', 79', Hedlund '45, Tibbling '64	7,468	5th
36	25 May 2019	OB	A	2–0	Wilczek 38', Uhre 73'	14,246	4th

=== Partial league table ===
Championship round
Pos	Team	Pld	W	D	L	GF	GA	GD	Pts	Qualification	COP	MID	ESB	BRO	ODE	NOR
1	Copenhagen (C)	36	26	4	6	86	37	+49	82	Qualification for the Champions League second qualifying round	—	3–0	1–0	3–2	4–0	1–3
2	Midtjylland	36	21	8	7	76	43	+33	71	Qualification for the Europa League third qualifying round	4–0	—	1–2	1–2	2–0	0–0
3	Esbjerg	36	16	8	12	45	47	−2	56	Qualification for the Europa League second qualifying round	4–3	2–2	—	1–0	0–0	0–0
4	Brøndby (O)	36	15	7	14	60	52	+8	52	Qualification for the European play-off match	1–2	4–1	0–1	—	2–2	2–0
5	Odense	36	14	10	12	48	48	0	52		0–1	3–1	4–1	0–2	—	2–2
6	Nordsjælland	36	10	14	12	52	54	−2	44		0–3	1–2	1–2	1–1	2–2	—

Source: Soccerway
Legend: Blue = home team win; Yellow = draw; Red = away team win.
(C) Champions; (O) Play-off winners

==== European play-off match ====
The 4th-placed team of the championship round advances to a play-off match against the winning team of the qualification round (no. 7) in a single-leg tie, with the team from the championship round as hosts. The winner earns a place in the Europa League second qualifying round.

Date	Opponents	Venue	Result	Scorers	Attendance
31 May 2019	Randers	H	4–2	Wilczek 55', Kaiser '67, Halimi '72, Riis Jakobsen 53' (o.g.)	16,773

== UEFA Europa League ==
Having finished in second place in the 2017–18 Danish Superliga and having won the 2017–18 Danish Cup, Brøndby entered the 2018–19 UEFA Europa League third qualifying round, where they faced off against Serbian club Spartak Subotica. In the first match at the Rajko Mitić Stadium, (Note: Spartak Subotica played their third qualifying round home match at the Rajko Mitić Stadium in Belgrade instead of their usual venue, the Subotica City Stadium, as it did not meet UEFA requirements.) Brøndby secured a 2-0 victory, with Dominik Kaiser netting his first goal for the club just before halftime and Hany Mukhtar doubling the lead shortly after the break. Although Brøndby dominated with their high press, they struggled to convert possession into clear chances, yet they managed the game effectively to secure the win. In the return leg at Brøndby Stadium, Brøndby advanced in the Europa League qualification by defeating Subotica 2-1. Despite being reduced to ten men after Joel Kabongo's early red card, Dominik Kaiser put Brøndby ahead in the 68th minute. Subotica equalised ten minutes before the end through Dejan Đenić, but Kamil Wilczek secured the victory with a stoppage-time goal.

Brøndby were drawn against Belgian club Genk in the play-off round. Brøndby started the away match at Luminus Arena with manager Alexander Zorniger's characteristic aggressive pressing, but despite their efforts, they were unable to score early on. Hany Mukhtar's long-range shot hit the crossbar, and his subsequent attempt was saved by Genk's goalkeeper, Danny Vukovic. Genk took the lead in the 36th minute when Mbwana Samatta headed in a cross from Alejandro Pozuelo. Shortly before halftime, Johan Larsson was penalised for handling the ball in the penalty area, and Leandro Trossard converted the resulting penalty, giving Genk a 2–0 lead. In the second half, Brøndby responded with renewed pressure and pulled a goal back through Hjörtur Hermannsson, who scored from a corner kick. Kamil Wilczek then equalised by finishing a pass from Ante Erceg. However, Genk regained their lead when Samatta scored twice more, completing his hat-trick, including a goal following a Brøndby defensive error. The match concluded with a stoppage-time goal from Trossard, making the final score 5–2 in favor of Genk.

Brøndby's Europa League campaign concluded with a 4–2 defeat to Genk at Brøndby Stadium, resulting in a 9–4 aggregate loss. Despite trailing 5–2 from the first leg, Brøndby applied high pressure but struggled from the outset as Genk took the lead through Ruslan Malinovskyi in the 15th minute. Dieumerci Ndongala then doubled Genk's advantage before Kamil Wilczek pulled one back for Brøndby. Johan Larsson equalised shortly after, but Sébastien Dewaest's header restored Genk's lead. Mbwana Samatta added a fourth for Genk in the 87th minute, ending Brøndby's hopes of advancing to the Europa League group stage.

=== Match details ===
Date	Round	Opponents	H / A	Result F–A	Scorers	Attendance
9 August 2018	Third qualifying round First leg	Spartak Subotica	A	2–0	Kaiser 29', Mukhtar '47	4,000
16 August 2018	Third qualifying round Second leg	Spartak Subotica	H	2–1	Kaiser 69', Wilczek 90+3'	10,142
23 August 2018	Play-off round First leg	Genk	A	2–5	Hermannsson 47', Wilczek 51'	12,110
30 August 2018	Play-off round Second leg	Genk	H	2–4	Wilczek 34', Larsson 58'	8,636

== Player details ==
List of squad players, including number of appearances by competition

No.	Pos	Nat	Player	Total		Danish Superliga		Danish Cup		Europa League	
No.	Pos	Nat	Player	Apps	Goals	Apps	Goals	Apps	Goals	Apps	Goals
1	GK	(Germany) GER	Marvin Schwäbe	44	0	37	0	3	0	4	0
16	GK	(Germany) GER	Benjamin Bellot	3	0	1	0	2	0	0	0
30	GK	(Denmark) DEN	Mads Hermansen	0	0	0	0	0	0	0	0
2	DF	(Denmark) DEN	Jens Martin Gammelby	24	1	17	1	3	0	4	0
3	DF	(Germany) GER	Anthony Jung	39	0	32	0	3	0	4	0
4	DF	(Germany) GER	Benedikt Röcker	25	1	23	1	1	0	1	0
6	DF	(Iceland) ISL	Hjörtur Hermannsson	29	1	21	0	5	0	3	1
13	DF	(Sweden) SWE	Johan Larsson	23	3	19	2	0	0	4	1
15	DF	(Germany) GER	Björn Kopplin	5	0	3	0	2	0	0	0
23	DF	(Finland) FIN	Paulus Arajuuri	33	0	27	0	3	0	3	0
24	DF	(Denmark) DEN	Joel Kabongo	18	0	15	0	1	0	2	0
25	DF	(Denmark) DEN	Gregers Arndal-Lauritzen	1	0	0	0	1	0	0	0
28	DF	(Denmark) DEN	Anton Skipper	0	0	0	0	0	0	0	0
29	DF	(Trinidad and Tobago) TTO	Luke Singh	0	0	0	0	0	0	0	0
5	MF	(Kosovo) KOS	Besar Halimi	25	4	21	2	4	2	0	0
7	MF	(Germany) GER	Dominik Kaiser	41	6	33	3	4	1	4	2
8	MF	(Denmark) DEN	Kasper Fisker	13	1	10	0	1	1	2	0
9	MF	(Denmark) DEN	Uffe Bech	8	2	8	2	0	0	0	0
10	MF	(Germany) GER	Hany Mukhtar	37	7	29	6	4	0	4	1
12	MF	(Sweden) SWE	Simon Tibbling	44	5	36	5	5	0	3	0
19	MF	(Denmark) DEN	Christian Nørgaard	1	0	1	0	0	0	0	0
21	MF	(Denmark) DEN	Lasse Vigen Christensen	32	1	25	1	3	0	4	0
22	MF	(Croatia) CRO	Josip Radošević	37	2	30	2	3	0	4	0
26	MF	(Slovakia) SVK	Filip Blažek	1	0	0	0	1	0	0	0
32	MF	(Denmark) DEN	Morten Frendrup	4	1	3	0	1	1	0	0
35	MF	(Denmark) DEN	Jesper Lindstrøm	1	0	0	0	1	0	0	0
37	MF	(Denmark) DEN	Andreas Pyndt	1	0	0	0	1	0	0	0
11	FW	(Denmark) DEN	Mikael Uhre	35	8	28	6	4	2	3	0
14	FW	(Denmark) DEN	Kevin Mensah	11	1	8	0	3	1	0	0
17	FW	(Denmark) DEN	Andreas Bruus	0	0	0	0	0	0	0	0
18	FW	(Denmark) DEN	Nikolai Laursen	22	2	17	1	4	1	1	0
20	FW	(Poland) POL	Kamil Wilczek	41	27	34	22	3	2	4	3
27	FW	(Sweden) SWE	Simon Hedlund	19	4	16	4	3	0	0	0
50	FW	(Croatia) CRO	Ante Erceg	28	5	22	4	2	1	4	0

== Transfers and loans ==
=== Transfers in ===
Date	Pos.	Name	From	Fee	Ref.
1 July 2018 (Note: Deal agreed 18 January 2018)	FW	(Denmark) Mikael Uhre	(Denmark) SønderjyskE	Undisclosed (Note: Fee reported as €400,000)	
1 July 2018 (Note: Deal agreed 7 May 2018)	DF	(Germany) Björn Kopplin	(Denmark) Hobro	Free	
1 July 2018 (Note: Deal agreed 22 May 2018)	DF	(Denmark) Jens Martin Gammelby	(Denmark) Silkeborg	Undisclosed (Note: Fee reported as €800,000)	
1 July 2018 (Note: Deal agreed 6 June 2018)	GK	(Croatia) Ante Erceg	(United Arab Emirates) Shabab Al Ahli	Free	
1 July 2018 (Note: Deal agreed 12 June 2018)	GK	(Germany) Marvin Schwäbe	(Germany) TSG Hoffenheim	Undisclosed (Note: Fee reported as €700,000)	
1 July 2018 (Note: Deal agreed 25 June 2018)	MF	(Germany) Dominik Kaiser	(Germany) RB Leipzig	Free	
1 July 2018 (Note: Deal agreed 26 June 2018)	DF	(Germany) Anthony Jung	(Germany) RB Leipzig	Undisclosed	
27 July 2018	MF	(Croatia) Josip Radošević	(Croatia) Hajduk Split	Undisclosed	
30 August 2018	MF	(Kosovo) Besar Halimi	(Germany) Mainz 05	Undisclosed	
11 January 2019	FW	(Sweden) Simon Hedlund	(Germany) Union Berlin	Undisclosed (Note: Fee reported as €250,000)	

=== Transfers out ===
Date	Pos.	Name	To	Fee	Ref.
30 June 2018 (Note: Deal agreed 12 April 2018)	GK	(Denmark) Frederik Rønnow	(Germany) Eintracht Frankfurt	€2.8 million	
30 June 2018 (Note: Deal agreed 25 June 2018)	DF	(Denmark) Svenn Crone	(Denmark) Silkeborg	Undisclosed (Note: Fee reported as €50,000)	
30 June 2018	GK	(Denmark) Viktor Anker	Released (Note: Joined Helsingør on 27 July 2018)		
30 June 2018	FW	(Finland) Teemu Pukki	Free (Note: Joined Norwich City on 30 June 2018)		
10 July 2018	FW	(Sweden) Gustaf Nilsson	(Denmark) Vejle	Undisclosed (Note: Fee reported as €125,000)	
19 July 2018	MF	(Denmark) Christian Nørgaard	(Italy) Fiorentina	€3.5 million	
31 December 2018	DF	(Germany) Björn Kopplin	(Denmark) Randers	Undisclosed	
31 December 2018	DF	(Sweden) Johan Larsson	Free (Note: Joined Guingamp on 1 January 2019)		
31 January 2019	DF	(Denmark) Gregers Arndal-Lauritzen	Released (Note: Joined AC Horsens on 11 February 2019)		

=== Loans in ===
Date from	Date to	Pos.	Name	From	Ref.
27 July 2018	End of season	FW	(Denmark) Nikolai Laursen	(Netherlands) PSV	
31 August 2018	31 December 2018	FW	(Denmark) Uffe Bech	(Germany) Hannover 96	
31 January 2019	31 December 2019	DF	(Trinidad and Tobago) Luke Singh	(Canada) Toronto FC	

=== Loans out ===
Date from	Date to	Pos.	Name	To	Ref.
3 August 2018	End of season	DF	(Denmark) Christian Enemark	(Denmark) HB Køge	
27 August 2018	31 December 2019	DF	(Slovenia) Gregor Sikošek	(Slovenia) Domžale	
31 August 2018	End of season	FW	(Denmark) Andreas Bruus	(Denmark) Roskilde	
11 January 2019	31 December 2019	FW	(Denmark) Magnus Warming	(Denmark) Nykøbing	
31 January 2019	30 June 2019	MF	(Slovakia) Filip Blažek	(Slovakia) Skalica	
