= 2018 Danish Cup final =

- Event: 2017–18 Danish Cup
Brøndby IF	Silkeborg IF
3	1
- Date: 10 May 2018
- Venue: Parken Stadium, Copenhagen
- Referee: Anders Poulsen
- Attendance: 31,027
- Weather: Clear; 22 °C (72 °F); 68% humidity

The 2018 Danish Cup final was played on 10 May 2018 between Brøndby IF and Silkeborg IF at Parken Stadium, Copenhagen, a neutral ground. The final was the culmination of the 2017–18 Danish Cup, the 64th season of the Danish Cup.

Brøndby IF won their seventh Danish Cup title after defeating Silkeborg IF 3–1, earning themselves a place in the second qualifying round of the 2018–19 UEFA Europa League.

== Teams ==
Team	Previous finals appearances (bold indicates winners)
Brøndby IF	9 (**1989**, 1996, **1998**, **2003**, **2005**, **2008**, 2017, **2018**)
Silkeborg IF	2 (**2001**, 2018)

== Venue ==
All Cup Finals except the 1991 final (Odense Stadium) and 1992 final (Aarhus Idrætspark) have been played in the Copenhagen Sports Park (1955-1990), or Parken Stadium (1993-present)

== Background ==
The Superliga clubs Brøndby IF and Silkeborg IF contested the final, with the winner earning a place in the second qualifying round of the 2018–19 UEFA Europa League.

Brøndby competed in its second consecutive final after losing to F.C. Copenhagen in 2017 and their eighth in total. Silkeborg IF made its first finals appearance since 2001 and their second overall. Both clubs lost in their previous final appearances. The two teams had never previously met in a Danish Cup final, and Brøndby has won both meetings during the regular season of the 2017-18 Danish Superliga.

== Route to the final ==
Note: In all results below, the score of the finalist is given first (H: home; A: away).

Brøndby IF		Round	Silkeborg IF	
Opponent	Result		Opponent	Result
Bye		Second round	Kjellerup IF	6–0 (A)
Ledøje-Smørum	5–1 (A)	Third round	HIK	2–2 (A) (4–3 p)
F.C. Copenhagen	1–0 (A)	Fourth round	Lyngby BK	3–1 (H)
SønderjyskE	1–0 (A)	Quarterfinals	Randers FC	3–1 (H)
FC Midtjylland	3–1 (H)	Semifinals	FC Fredericia	1–0 (A)

== Match ==
=== Details ===
10 May 2018
12:00

Brøndby IF (1)	3–1	Silkeborg IF (1)
Röcker 35'; Wilczek 41', 91'	Report	Skhirtladze 33'

Parken Stadium, Copenhagen
Attendance: 31,027
Referee: Anders Poulsen

**Brøndby IF**	**Silkeborg IF**

GK	1	(Denmark) Frederik Rønnow
DF	3	(Germany) Anthony Jung
DF	4	(Germany) Benedikt Röcker
DF	6	(Iceland) Hjörtur Hermannsson
FW	9	(Finland) Teemu Pukki	(substituted off) 87'
MF	10	(Germany) Hany Mukhtar
MF	12	(Sweden) Simon Tibbling	(substituted off) 78'
DF	13	(Sweden) Johan Larsson (c)
MF	18	(Kosovo) Besar Halimi	(substituted off) 61'
MF	19	(Denmark) Christian Nørgaard
FW	20	(Poland) Kamil Wilczek
Substitutes:
MF	21	(Denmark) Lasse Vigen Christensen	(substituted on) 61'
MF	8	(Denmark) Kasper Fisker	(substituted on) 78'	(yellow card) 82'
DF	23	(Finland) Paulus Arajuuri	(substituted on) 87'
MF	14	(Denmark) Kevin Mensah
GK	16	(Germany) Benjamin Bellot
FW	17	(Denmark) Andreas Bruus
DF	27	(Denmark) Svenn Crone
Manager:
(Germany) Alexander Zorniger

GK	16	(Denmark) Peter Friis Jensen
DF	4	(Denmark) Simon Jakobsen
DF	6	(Denmark) Jens Martin Gammelby
DF	28	(Denmark) Tobias Salquist
DF	13	(Denmark) Mikkel Vendelbo	(yellow card) 13'
MF	17	(Denmark) Casper Sloth
MF	18	(Ghana) Ibrahim Moro	(substituted off) 61'
MF	93	(Montenegro) Vladimir Rodić
DF	15	(Denmark) Gustav Dahl	(substituted off) 68'
MF	19	(Denmark) Magnus Mattsson
MF	10	(Georgia (country)) Davit Skhirtladze	(substituted off) 78'
Substitutes:
FW	20	(Denmark) Marc Rochester Sørensen	(substituted on) 61'
MF	2	(Denmark) Sammy Skytte	(substituted on) 68'
FW	9	(Sweden) Gustaf Nilsson	(substituted on) 78'
MF	14	(Denmark) Dennis Flinta
DF	24	(Denmark) Jeppe Gertsen
GK	1	(Denmark) Thomas Nørgaard
MF	22	(Namibia) Valance Nambishi
Manager:
(Denmark) Peter Sørensen

Assistant referees:
Jesper Dahl
Victor Skytte

**Match rules**

- 90 minutes.
- 30 minutes of extra time if necessary.
- Penalty shoot-out if scores still level.
- Seven named substitutes, of which up to three may be used.
