= Lotte Vestergaard =

Danish handball player (born 1997)

Personal information
- Full name: Lotte Vestergaard
- Nationality: Danish
- Born: 18 July 1997 (age 29) Aars, Denmark
- Height: 1.72 m (5 ft 8 in)

Sport
- Sport: Handball
- Position: Left back
- Current club: Hadsten Håndbold
- Number: 35

Youth career
- Years: Team
- 2013-2016: Randers HK

Senior clubs
- Years: Team
- 2015–2017: Randers HK
- 2018–2020: Hadsten Håndbold
- 2020–2023: Skanderborg Håndbold
- 2023–: Hadsten Håndbold

Lotte Vestergaard (born 18 July 1997) is a Danish handball player who currently plays for Hadsten Håndbold.

On 12 April 2020, it was announced that she had signed a 2-year contract with Skanderborg Håndbold, from Hadsten Håndbold. She returned to Hadsten Håndbold after 3 years at Skanderborg.

== Achievements ==
- Danish Cup:
  - Winner: 2016
