= Judo at the 2010 Summer Youth Olympics – Boys' 81 kg =

Judo competition

The Boys' 81 kg tournament in Judo at the 2010 Summer Youth Olympics was held on August 22 at the International Convention Centre.

This event was the second heaviest of the boy's judo weight classes, limiting competitors to a maximum of 81 kilograms of body mass. The tournament bracket consisted of a single-elimination contest culminating in a gold medal match. There was also a repechage to determine the winners of the two bronze medals. Each judoka who had lost before the finals competed in the repechage with the two finalists getting bronze medals.

== Medalists ==
Gold	Jae Hyung Lee; South Korea
Silver	Khasan Khalmurzaev; Russia
Bronze	Arpad Szakacs; Slovakia
Bronze	Krisztian Toth; Hungary

== Results ==
=== Main Bracket ===
Round of 16
Kevin Fernandez (HON)	000
Arpad Szakacs (SVK)	100
Michael Greiter (AUT)	010
Eldin Omerovic (BIH)	000
Krisztian Toth (HUN)	002
Anis Shalabi (LBA)	000
Ghenadie Pretivatii (MDA)	000
Daryl Lokuku Ngambomo (COD)	001
Alexios Ntanatsidis (GRE)	100
Chin Jie Lim (SIN)	000
Rijad Dedeic (MNE)	011
Batuhan Efemgil (TUR)	102

Quarterfinals
Arpad Szakacs (SVK)	001
Khasan Khalmurzaev (RUS)	101
Michael Greiter (AUT)	000
Krisztian Toth (HUN)	002
Daryl Lokuku Ngambomo (COD)	001
Jae Hyung Lee (KOR)	010
Alexios Ntanatsidis (GRE)	011
Batuhan Efemgil (TUR)	010

Semifinals
Khasan Khalmurzaev (RUS)	001
Krisztian Toth (HUN)	000
Jae Hyung Lee (KOR)	111
Alexios Ntanatsidis (GRE)	000

Finals
Khasan Khalmurzaev (RUS)	001
Jae Hyung Lee (KOR)	002

=== Repechage ===
First round
Kevin Fernandez (HON)	BYE
Eldin Omerovic (BIH)	001
Anis Shalabi (LBA)	000
Ghenadie Pretivatii (MDA)	BYE
Chin Jie Lim (SIN)	000
Rijad Dedeic (MNE)	021

Second round
Kevin Fernandez (HON)	000
Michael Greiter (AUT)	110
Eldin Omerovic (BIH)	000
Arpad Szakacs (SVK)	100
Ghenadie Pretivatii (MDA)	001
Batuhan Efemgil (TUR)	010
Rijad Dedeic (MNE)	100
Daryl Lokuku Ngambomo (COD)	000

Third round
Michael Greiter (AUT)	000
Arpad Szakacs (SVK)	110
Batuhan Efemgil (TUR)	020
Rijad Dedeic (MNE)	000

Bronze Medal Finals
Arpad Szakacs (SVK)	011
Alexios Ntanatsidis (GRE)	000
Batuhan Efemgil (TUR)	001
Krisztian Toth (HUN)	100
