= Australia women's national youth handball team =

Australia

Information
- Association: Australian Handball Federation

Colours
1st	2nd

Results

Youth Olympic Games
- Appearances: 1 (First in 2010)
- Best result: 6th Place (2010)

IHF U-18 World Championship
- Appearances: 0

Oceania Youth Handball Championship
- Appearances: 2 (First in 2009)
- Best result: 2nd
- Last updated on 14 January 2020.

The Australian women's national youth handball team is the national under–17 Handball team of Australia. Controlled by the Australian Handball Federation it represents Australia in international matches.

== History ==
=== Youth Olympic Games record ===
Year	Round	Position	GP	W	D	L	GS	GA	GD
Singapore 2010	1st	6th	4	0	0	4	44	162	–118
China 2014	Did not qualify								
Total	1/2	0 Titles	4	0	0	4	44	162	–118

=== Oceania Nations Cup record ===
Year	Round	Position	GP	W	D	L	GS	GA	GD
New Caledonia 2009	Final	2nd	4	0	0	4	?	?	?
New Caledonia 2019	3rd place game	4th	5	2	0	3	107	110	-3
Total	2/2	0 Titles	9	2	0	6	107	110	-3
