= Madagascar at the 2010 Summer Youth Olympics =

- IOC code: MAD
- NOC: Comité Olympique Malgache

in Singapore
- Competitors: 6 in 3 sports
- Flag bearer: Zarah Razafimahatratra

Summer Youth Olympics appearances
- 2010; 2014; 2018

Madagascar competed at the 2010 Summer Youth Olympics, the inaugural Youth Olympic Games, held in Singapore from 14 August to 26 August 2010.

== Athletics ==
=== Girls ===
Track and Road Events

Athletes	Event	Qualification		Final	
Athletes	Event	Result	Rank	Result	Rank
Tsiatengy Razafindrakoto	Girls’ 400m	57.94	15 qB	58.53	15

== Swimming ==
Athletes	Event	Heat		Semifinal		Final	
Athletes	Event	Time	Position	Time	Position	Time	Position
Tsilavina Andritina Ramanantsoa	Boys’ 100m Freestyle	1:02.80	53	Did not advance			
Tsilavina Andritina Ramanantsoa	Boys’ 100m Butterfly	1:06.88	32	Did not advance			
Tsilavina Ramanantsoa	Boys’ 100m Breaststroke	1:14.27	28	Did not advance			
Tsilavina Ramanantsoa	Boys’ 200m Breaststroke	2:38.41	20			Did not advance	
Aina Filsrabetsara	Girls’ 100m Freestyle	1:06.73	50	Did not advance			
Aina Filsrabetsara	Girls’ 50m Butterfly	30.54	19	Did not advance			

== Tennis ==
Singles

Athlete	Event	Round 1	Round 2	Quarterfinals	Semifinals	Final	Rank
Niriantsa Rasolomalala	Girls' Singles	Tang (CHN); L 0–2 (0–6, 5–7)	Consolation; Pérez (VEN); L 0–2 (4–6, 3–6)	Did not advance			
Zarah Razafimahatratra	Girls' Singles	Radulovic (MNE); W 2–0 (6–0, 6–2)	Zheng (CHN); L 0–2 (4–6, 2–6)	Did not advance			

Doubles

Athlete	Event	Round 1	Quarterfinals	Semifinals	Final	Rank
Niriantsa Rasolomalala (MAD); Zarah Razafimahatratra (MAD)	Girls' Doubles	Babos (HUN); Mestach (BEL); L 0–2 (1–6, 3–6)	Did not advance			
