= Camilla Fangel =

Danish handball player (born 1992)

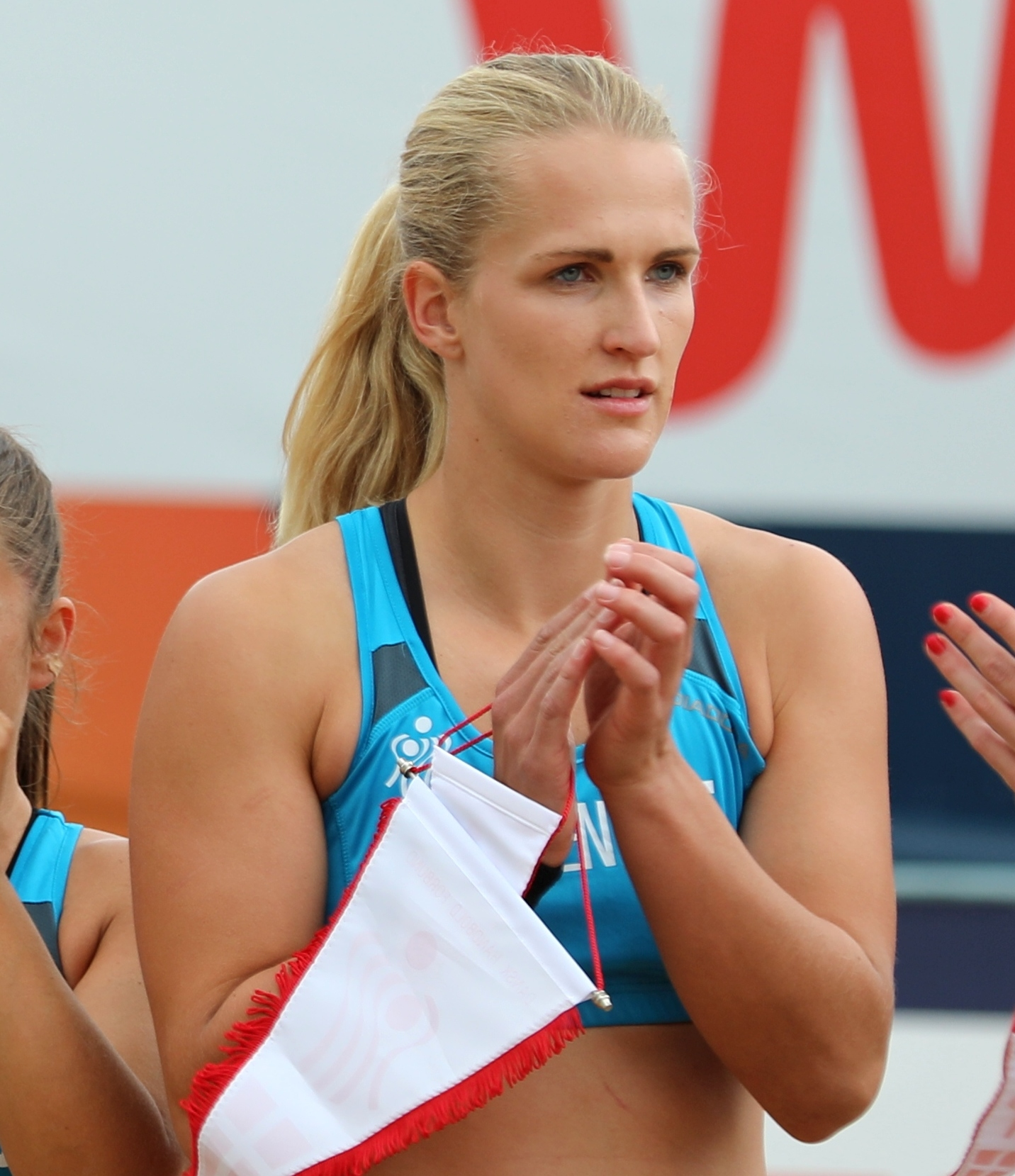

Personal information
- Full name: Camilla Fangel
- Nationality: Danish
- Born: 29 February 1992 (age 34) Herning, Denmark
- Height: 1.89 m (6 ft 2 in)

Sport
- Sport: Handball
- Position: Line player
- Current club: Herning-Ikast Håndbold
- Number: 6

Senior clubs
- Years: Team
- 2009-2010: SønderjyskE Håndbold
- 2010-2011: Horsens HK
- 2011–2012: Roskilde Håndbold
- 2012-2015: NFH
- 2015-2017: SK Aarhus
- 2017-2019: Silkeborg-Voel KFUM
- 2019-2020: Ringkøbing Håndbold
- 2020-: Herning-Ikast Håndbold
Medal record
Women's Team handball
Representing Denmark
Youth Olympic Games
| Gold medal – first place | 2010 Singapore |
Women's Beach handball
Representing Denmark
World Beach Games
| Gold medal – first place | 2019 Doha |
European Championship
| Gold medal – first place | 2019 Stare Jabłonki |

Camilla Fangel (born 29 February 1992) is a female Danish handball player who plays for Ringkøbing Håndbold.

In addition to regular handball, she is also a beach handball player and has featured in the Danish National Beach Handball Team. She was a part of the Danish team that won the Beach Games 2019 Handball tournament and the 2019 European Beach Handball Championship.
