= Hadsten Sports Klub Håndbold =

Danish handball club

Hadsten SK Håndbold
- Full name: Hadsten Sports Klub Håndbold
- Founded: June 27, 2005; 20 years ago
- Arena: Vestjysk BANK Arena
- Head coach: Ryan Zinglersen
- League: Danish 1st Division
- 2022–23: 6th
- Club colours
Home	Away

Location of Hadsten SK

Hadsten Sports Klub Håndbold is a handball club from Hadsten, Denmark. It is part of the multi-sports club Hadsten SK, which also has a football and basketball team. Currently, Hadsten SK competes in the women's Danish 1st Division. The home arena of the club is Vestjysk BANK Arena (formerly known as Hadsten Hallen). Former female national team player Anne Dorthe Tanderup started her handball career as U8 player in Vissing-Hadsten HK and former national team player Maria Fisker has also played in the club.

The club was formed in 2005 as a merger between Vissing-Hadsten HK and Hadsten Gymnastikforening. Hadsten Gymnastikforening has roots back to 1921.

== Current squad ==
Squad for the 2023–24 season

Goalkeeper

- 12 (Denmark) Alberte Hamborg
- 77 (Denmark) Lærke Ibsen Kristensen

Wingers
LW

- 2 (Denmark) Helena Sall
- 29 (Denmark) Signe Schaar

RW

- 79 (Denmark) Julie Højbjerg Rasmussen

Pivots

- 11 (Denmark) Kamilla Bruus
- 27 (Denmark) Julie Molbech

Back players
LB

- 8 (Denmark) Sofie Ladekjær
- 15 (Denmark) Mathilde Pedersen
- 17 (Denmark) Simone Handberg Pedersen
- 20 (Denmark) Stine Kjær Schmidt

CB

- 5 (Denmark) Lotte Vestergaard
- 6 (Denmark) Camilla Madsen
- 55 (Denmark) Ida Callisen

RB

- 9 (Denmark) Kristina Bruus

Coach

(Denmark) Ryan Zinglersen

Assistant coach

(Denmark) Max Ørum Christensen

=== Transfers ===
Transfers in the 2024–25 season.

Joining

- (Denmark) Camilla Madsen (C)

Leaving

- (Denmark) Ryan Zinglersen (C)
- (Denmark) Max Ørum Christensen (AC)
- (Denmark) Helena Sall
