= Tennis at the 2010 Summer Youth Olympics – Girls' doubles =

Girls' doubles
- Tennis at the 2010 Summer Youth Olympics

Events
Singles	boys	girls
Doubles	boys	girls
- Summer Youth Olympics

These are the results for the girls' doubles event at the 2010 Summer Youth Olympics.

== Seeds ==
1. Tímea Babos (HUN) / An-Sophie Mestach (BEL) (semifinals, bronze medalists)
2. Sofiya Kovalets (UKR) / Elina Svitolina (UKR) (quarterfinals)
3. Cristina Dinu (ROU) / Ons Jabeur (TUN) (quarterfinals)
4. Jana Čepelová (SVK) / Chantal Škamlová (SVK) (final, silver medalists)

== Draw ==
=== Finals ===
Semifinals
1	Tímea Babos (HUN); An-Sophie Mestach (BEL)	6	3	[7]
Tang Haochen (CHN); Zheng Saisai (CHN)	3	6	[10]
4	Jana Čepelová (SVK); Chantal Škamlová (SVK)	6	7
Daria Gavrilova (RUS); Yulia Putintseva (RUS)	4	6^{7}

Gold medal match
Tang Haochen (CHN); Zheng Saisai (CHN)	6	3	[10]
4	Jana Čepelová (SVK); Chantal Škamlová (SVK)	4	6	[4]
Bronze medal match
1	Tímea Babos (HUN); An-Sophie Mestach (BEL)	6	6
Daria Gavrilova (RUS); Yulia Putintseva (RUS)	2	2

=== Top half ===
First round
1	T Babos (HUN); A-S Mestach (BEL)	6	6
N Rasolomalala (MAD); Z Razafimahatratra (MAD)	1	3
L Kumkhum (THA); GS Ysidora (INA)	1	4
S Ishizu (JPN); E Mutaguchi (JPN)	6	6
3	C Dinu (ROU); O Jabeur (TUN)	7	3	[10]
D Allertová (CZE); M Radulović (MNE)	5	6	[1]
D Erić (SRB); A-L Friedsam (GER)	5	6	[11]
H Tang (CHN); S Zheng (CHN)	7	2	[13]

Quarterfinals
1	T Babos (HUN); A-S Mestach (BEL)	4	6	[14]
S Ishizu (JPN); E Mutaguchi (JPN)	6	3	[12]
3	C Dinu (ROU); O Jabeur (TUN)	2	3
H Tang (CHN); S Zheng (CHN)	6	6

Semifinals
1	T Babos (HUN); A-S Mestach (BEL)	6	3	[7]
H Tang (CHN); S Zheng (CHN)	3	6	[10]

=== Bottom half ===
First round
M Jodoin (CAN); K Palivets (CAN)	1	6^{4}
M Grage (DEN); I Kremen (BLR)	6	7
A Gámiz (VEN); A Pérez (VEN)	3	6^{6}
4	J Čepelová (SVK); C Škamlová (SVK)	6	7
M Puig (PUR); S Tan (SIN)	4	5
D Gavrilova (RUS); Y Putintseva (RUS)	6	7
V Cepede Royg (PAR); AS Eskenazi (ARG)	2	6	[5]
2	S Kovalets (UKR); E Svitolina (UKR)	6	4	[10]

Quarterfinals
M Grage (DEN); I Kremen (BLR)	4	3
4	J Čepelová (SVK); C Škamlová (SVK)	6	6
D Gavrilova (RUS); Y Putintseva (RUS)	6	6
2	S Kovalets (UKR); E Svitolina (UKR)	4	4

Semifinals
4	J Čepelová (SVK); C Škamlová (SVK)	6	7
D Gavrilova (RUS); Y Putintseva (RUS)	4	6^{7}
