= Mathilde Bjerregaard =

Danish handball player (born 1993)

Personal information
- Nationality: Danish
- Born: 9 August 1993 (age 33) Aarhus
- Height: 1.85 m (6 ft 1 in)

Sport
- Sport: Handball
- Position: Left Wing/Defender
- Current club: FCM Håndbold
- Number: 17

Youth career
- Years: Team
- 2009-2010: Horsens HK

Senior clubs
- Years: Team
- 2010-2011: Horsens HK
- 2011-2013: Odense Håndbold
- 2013-2014: FCM Håndbold
- 2014-2015: SK Aarhus
- 2015-2017: Silkeborg-Voel KFUM
- 2017-2020: FCM Håndbold
National team
Years	Team	Apps	(Gls)
–	Denmark (Junior)	33	(33)
Medal record
European Junior Championship
Gold medal – first place	2011 Netherlands
Youth Olympic Games
Gold medal – first place	2010 Singapore

Mathilde Bjerregaard (born 9 August 1993) is a Danish former handball player who played for FCM Håndbold.

== Honors ==
- Youth Olympic Games:
  - Winner: 2010
- European Women's U-19 Handball Championship:
  - Winner: 2011
