= Tennis at the 2010 Summer Youth Olympics – Girls' singles =

Girls' singles
- Tennis at the 2010 Summer Youth Olympics

Events
Singles	boys	girls
Doubles	boys	girls
- Summer Youth Olympics

These are the results for the girls' singles event at the 2010 Summer Youth Olympics.

== Seeds ==
1. Elina Svitolina (UKR) (second round)
2. Monica Puig (PUR) (first round)
3. Tímea Babos (HUN) (semifinals, 4th place)
4. Sachie Ishizu (JPN) (first round)
5. An-Sophie Mestach (BEL) (second round)
6. Verónica Cepede Royg (PAR) (first round)
7. Jana Čepelová (SVK) (semifinals, bronze medalist)
8. Ons Jabeur (TUN) (quarterfinals)

== Main draw ==
=== Finals ===
Semifinals
Daria Gavrilova (RUS)	5	7	6
7	Jana Čepelová (SVK)	7	5	3
3	Tímea Babos (HUN)	4	1
Zheng Saisai (CHN)	6	6

Gold medal match
Daria Gavrilova (RUS)	2	6	6
Zheng Saisai (CHN)	6	2	0
Bronze medal match
7	Jana Čepelová (SVK)	6	7
3	Tímea Babos (HUN)	2	5

=== Top half ===
First round
1	Elina Svitolina (UKR)	6	4	6
Anna-Lena Friedsam (GER)	2	6	1
HP	Stefanie Tan (SIN)	2	3
Daria Gavrilova (RUS)	6	6
NP	Niriantsa Rasolomalala (MAD)	0	5
Haochen Tang (CHN)	6	7
Cristina Dinu (ROU)	7	6
6	Verónica Cepede Royg (PAR)	5	3
4	Sachie Ishizu (JPN)	3	3
Ilona Kremen (BLR)	6	6
Adriana Pérez (VEN)	7^{7}	2	3
Luksika Kumkhum (THA)	6^{5}	6	6
Mai Grage (DEN)	6	6
Katarena Palivets (CAN)	4	4
Agustína Sol Eskenazi (ARG)	1	1^{r}
7	Jana Čepelová (SVK)	6	3

Second round
1	E Svitolina (UKR)	2	3
D Gavrilova (RUS)	6	6
H Tang (CHN)	7^{7}	2	6
C Dinu (ROU)	6^{1}	6	2
I Kremen (BLR)	6	3	0
L Kumkhum (THA)	1	6	6
M Grage (DEN)	6	6^{1}	4
7	J Čepelová (SVK)	3	7^{7}	6

Quarterfinals
D Gavrilova (RUS)	6	6
H Tang (CHN)	0	2
L Kumkhum (THA)	3	4
7	J Čepelová (SVK)	6	6

Semifinals
D Gavrilova (RUS)	5	7	6
7	J Čepelová (SVK)	7	5	3

=== Bottom half ===
First round
5	An-Sophie Mestach (BEL)	6	6
Marianne Jodoin (CAN)	2	0
Yulia Putintseva (RUS)	6	6
Emi Mutaguchi (JPN)	3	4
Andrea Gámiz (VEN)	3	6^{4}
Chantal Škamlová (SVK)	6	7^{7}
Sofiya Kovalets (UKR)	1	2
3	Tímea Babos (HUN)	6	6
8	Ons Jabeur (TUN)	7^{7}	6
Doroteja Erić (SRB)	6^{3}	3
Grace Sari Ysidora (INA)	3	2
Denisa Allertová (CZE)	6	6
NP	Mia Radulović (MNE)	0	2
Zarah Razafimahatratra (MAD)	6	6
Saisai Zheng (CHN)	6	6
2	Monica Puig (PUR)	2	4

Second round
5	A-S Mestach (BEL)	4	0
Y Putintseva (RUS)	6	6
C Škamlová (SVK)	5	3
3	T Babos (HUN)	7	6
8	O Jabeur (TUN)	6	6
D Allertová (CZE)	4	2
Z Razafimahatratra (MAD)	4	2
S Zheng (CHN)	6	6

Quarterfinals
Y Putintseva (RUS)	1	3
3	T Babos (HUN)	6	6
8	O Jabeur (TUN)	6^{2}	2
S Zheng (CHN)	7^{7}	6

Semifinals
3	T Babos (HUN)	4	1
S Zheng (CHN)	6	6

== Consolation draw ==
First round
1	Monica Puig (PUR)	6	3	[9]
Andrea Gámiz (VEN)	3	6	[11]
Anna-Lena Friedsam (GER)
Doroteja Erić (SRB)	w/o
3	Verónica Cepede Royg (PAR)	1	4
Emi Mutaguchi (JPN)	6	6
Agustína Sol Eskenazi (ARG)	w/o
Katarena Paliivets (CAN)
Stefanie Tan (SIN)	4	5
Marianne Jodoin (CAN)	6	7
Mia Radulović (MNE)
4	Sofiya Kovalets (UKR)	w/o
Adriana Pérez (VEN)	6	6
Niriantsa Rasolomalala (MAD)	4	3
Grace Sari Ysidora (INA)	w/o
2	Sachie Ishizu (JPN)

Quarterfinals
A Gámiz (VEN)	2	7	[7]
A-L Friedsam (GER)	6	5	[10]
E Mutaguchi (JPN)	3
K Paliivets (CAN)	0^{r}
M Jodoin (CAN)
M Radulović (MNE)	w/o
A Pérez (VEN)	1	3
2	S Ishizu (JPN)	6	6

Semifinals
A-L Friedsam (GER)	6	6
E Mutaguchi (JPN)	0	3
M Jodoin (CAN)	1	6^{1}
2	S Ishizu (JPN)	6	7^{7}

Final
A-L Friedsam (GER)	2	5
2	S Ishizu (JPN)	6	7
