= Jens Martin Gammelby =

Danish footballer (born 1995)

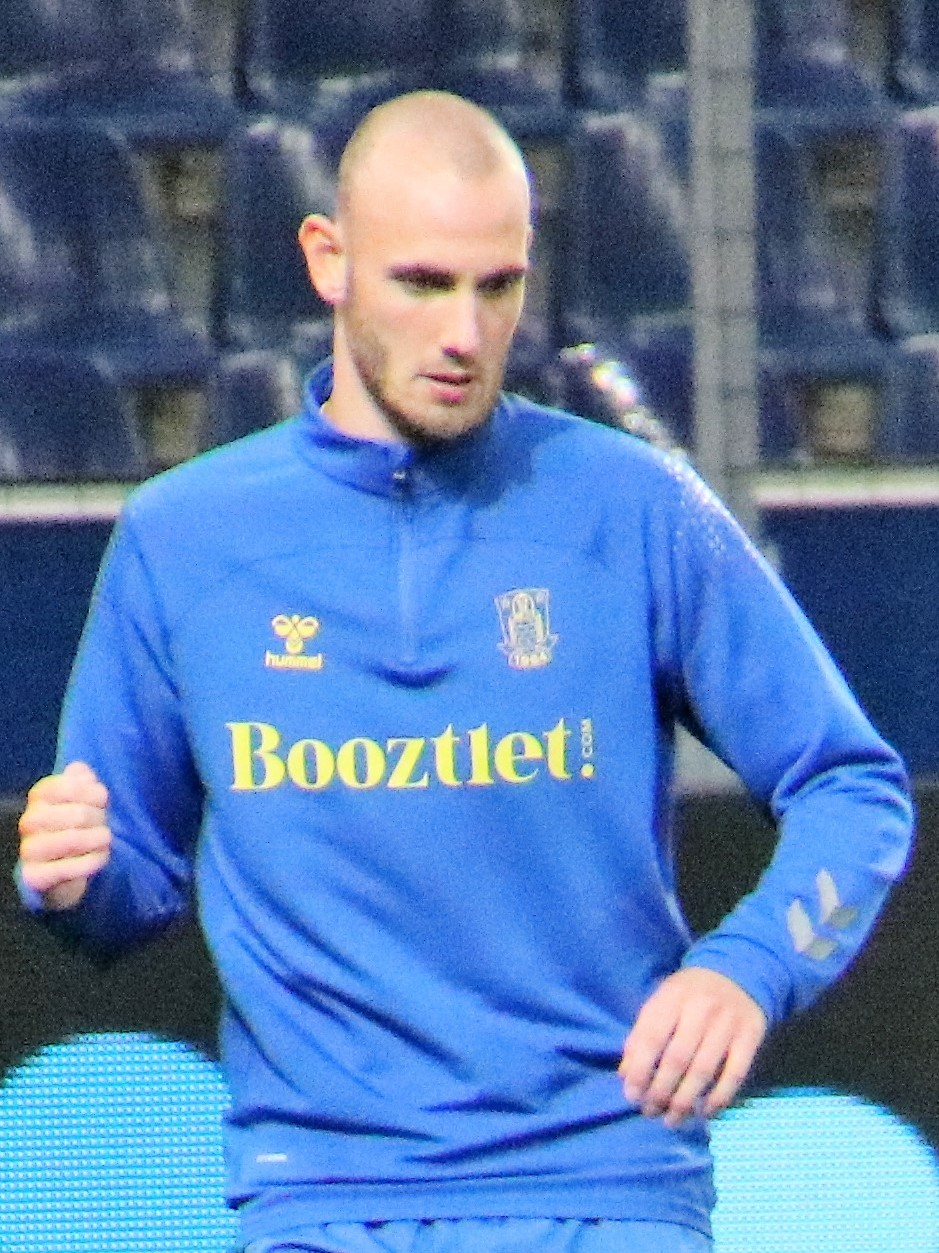
- Gammelby with Brøndby in 2021

Personal information
- Full name: Jens Martin Gammelby
- Date of birth: 5 February 1995 (age 31)
- Place of birth: Ikast, Denmark
- Height: 1.91 m (6 ft 3 in)
- Position: Right-back

Team information
- Current team: Silkeborg
- Number: 19

Youth career
- Midtjylland
- 2009–2014: Silkeborg

Senior career*
Years	Team	Apps	(Gls)
2014–2018	Silkeborg	127	(8)
2018–2023	Brøndby	50	(2)
2020–2021	→ Lyngby (loan)	26	(4)
2022	→ Miedź Legnica (loan)	16	(0)
2023	HamKam	24	(2)
2024–	Silkeborg	78	(9)

International career
2014	Denmark U20	1	(0)
2015	Denmark U21	1	(0)
2018	Denmark League XI	1	(1)
- * Club domestic league appearances and goals as of 16:09, 15 November 2026 (UTC)

Jens Martin Gammelby (Danish pronunciation: [ˈjens ˈmɑːtsʰin ˈkɑml̩ˌpyˀ]; born 5 February 1995) is a Danish professional footballer who plays as a right-back for Danish Superliga club Silkeborg.

A Silkeborg academy graduate, Gammelby made more than 100 first-team appearances and scored nine goals in his initial spell before a 2018 transfer to Brøndby. He later had loans at Lyngby and Miedź Legnica in Poland, and spent 2023 with Norwegian side HamKam. In January 2024, he returned to Silkeborg, winning the 2023–24 Danish Cup with the club.

Gammelby has also been capped by the Denmark League XI, scoring on his debut in 2018.

== Club career ==
=== Silkeborg ===
Born in Ikast, Gammelby joined Silkeborg IF's academy as an under-14 player after time in FC Midtjylland's youth system, progressing through Silkeborg's elite pathway (Sølystskolen elite classes, Silkeborg Efterskole and Silkeborg Fodbold College) before promotion to the first team. As a youth prospect he initially played as a striker, later converting to defence at under-19 level.

Gammelby made his senior debut on 27 March 2014 in a 1–0 away win over Hobro IK in the Danish 1st Division, starting at centre-back amid injuries to regulars in the position. The following month he signed a first senior deal through 2017; initially part-time to complete upper-secondary studies, becoming full-time from summer 2015.

By the 2016–17 season, he had established himself as first-choice at right-back in the Danish Superliga, starting 33 league matches that season, and in 2017 he was voted Silkeborg's Player of the Year. The 2017–18 campaign marked his breakout offensively, with six Superliga goals in 34 appearances from right-back.

=== Brøndby ===
In May 2018, it was reported that Gammelby would leave Silkeborg to join Brøndby in summer 2018, having agreed to a five-year contract after a breakout season for Silkeborg. He was assigned shirt number 2. On 29 July 2018, Gammelby made his debut as a substitute against Hobro IK, which ended in 2–1 win. During his first season in Brøndby, he struggled to make the starting lineup with head coach Alexander Zorniger preferring first Johan Larsson and since Kevin Mensah at the right back position. Gammelby made 17 appearances and scored one goal during his first season at the club.

During the 2019–20 season under new head coach Niels Frederiksen, Gammelby continued to struggle to make the starting lineup, with Frederiksen preferring Mensah and Larsson at his position. As Brøndby transitioned into a 3–5–2 formation during the fall, and left back Anthony Jung began playing in central defense with Mensah transitioning to the left back position as well as Larsson's contract expiring, Gammelby was expected to play more regularly during the latter half of the season.

==== Loan to Lyngby ====
On 5 October 2020, transfer deadline day, Gammelby moved to Superliga rivals Lyngby Boldklub on a season-long loan with an option to buy. He made his debut two days later, on 7 October, in a 5–4 win over Brønshøj in the Danish Cup. He suffered relegation to the Danish 1st Division with the club on 9 May 2021 after a loss to last placed AC Horsens before returning to Brøndby after his loan deal expired. This happened despite experiencing a strong season individually, scoring 4 goals in 27 total appearances as he was the preferred option as right winger for the team.

==== Return to Brøndby ====
After his loan at Lyngby, Gammelby returned to Brøndby ahead of the 2021–22 season and featured extensively in pre-season, including outside his usual right-back role. He made his first competitive appearance of the season as a half-time substitute in the Superliga opener away to AGF on 18 July 2021, a 1–1 draw.

On 17 August 2021, he made his UEFA Champions League debut in a 2–1 away defeat to Red Bull Salzburg in the play-off first leg, starting in central midfield amid a Brøndby squad hit by COVID-19 absences. He also featured in the second leg on 25 August, coming on in the 59th minute for Kevin Mensah; Brøndby again lost 2–1 to go out 4–2 on aggregate.

==== Loan to Miedź Legnica ====
On 21 January 2022, Gammelby was loaned out to Polish club Miedź Legnica for the rest of the year. He was recalled from his loan on 29 August 2022, to cover for injured players in the Brøndby team.

==== Second return to Brøndby ====
Gammelby made his competitive return for Brøndby on 4 September 2022, as he was preferred as right-back by head coach Niels Frederiksen ahead of Sebastian Sebulonsen in a 2–0 league win against AC Horsens. He scored his first goal after returning on 30 October, opening the score in the second minute against AaB.

=== HamKam ===
On 14 February 2023, Gammelby signed for Norwegian Eliteserien club HamKam, joining from Brøndby and slotting in at right-back under head coach Jakob Michelsen. He quickly established himself as a first-choice wing-back and scored his first Eliteserien goal for the club with a stoppage-time winner in a 3–2 home victory over Stabæk on 23 July 2023. On 3 September, he also netted in a 4–4 draw against league leaders Bodø/Glimt.

Across the 2023 league campaign he made 24 Eliteserien appearances and scored two goals for HamKam. In early September, HamKam announced that they had agreed to sell Gammelby to his former club Silkeborg with the transfer to take effect after the season; he remained with HamKam through the autumn run-in as the club secured its top-flight status for 2024.

=== Return to Silkeborg ===
On 4 September 2023, Silkeborg announced that Gammelby was set to return to the club on 1 January 2024, after a five-and-a-half-year absence. On 16 March 2025, Gammelby scored to put his team ahead against his former club Brøndby, but his goal only earned Silkeborg a 2–2 away draw on the final day of the Danish Superliga regular season, leaving them outside of the top six. On 7 May, he scored once again against the same opponent, this time the winning goal in Silkeborg's 2–1 victory over Brøndby in the 2024–25 Danish Cup semi-final second leg, securing his team's spot in back-to-back Danish Cup finals. On 14 August, Gammelby scored his first goal in European competitions in a 2–2 away draw against Jagiellonia Białystok during the UEFA Conference League third qualifying round.

== International career ==
He was handed his first and only cap for Denmark League XI in Denmark's 3–2 loss to Jordan in a friendly on 15 January 2018, scoring one goal in the match.

== Style of play ==
Gammelby is a modern attacking right-back noted for his pace and willingness to shuttle up and down the flank, and he is comfortable using either foot. He has been described by Brøndby's former sporting director Troels Bech as possessing "explosive pace" and strong offensive qualities with a willingness to take on his direct opponent. Earlier coverage by Tipsbladet highlighted his long strides and frequent overlapping runs on the right, noting his offensive interplay with Silkeborg teammate Robert Skov.

Standing at 1.91 m (6 ft 3 in) tall, Gammelby also has the frame to cover centrally and has occasionally been used at centre-back. He has also been deployed across the right side, including as a right winger during his loan at Lyngby.

== Career statistics ==
As of match played 6 November 2026

Appearances and goals by club, season and competition
Club	Season	League			National cup		Europe		Other		Total	
Club	Season	Division	Apps	Goals	Apps	Goals	Apps	Goals	Apps	Goals	Apps	Goals
Silkeborg	2013–14	Danish 1st Division	10	0	0	0	—		—		10	0
Silkeborg	2014–15	Danish Superliga	29	0	1	0	—		—		30	0
Silkeborg	2015–16	Danish 1st Division	23	1	0	0	—		—		23	1
Silkeborg	2016–17	Danish Superliga	33	2	1	0	—		—		34	2
Silkeborg	2017–18	Danish Superliga	32	6	4	0	—		4 (Note: Appearance in Danish Superliga relegation play-offs)	0	40	6
Silkeborg	Total		127	9	6	0	—		4	0	137	9
Brøndby	2018–19	Danish Superliga	17	1	2	0	2 (Note: Appearances in UEFA Europa League)	0	0	0	21	1
Brøndby	2019–20	Danish Superliga	16	0	0	0	4	0	—		20	0
Brøndby	2021–22	Danish Superliga	7	0	2	0	5 (Note: Two appearances in UEFA Champions League, three appearances in UEFA Europa League)	0	—		14	0
Brøndby	2022–23	Danish Superliga	10	1	1	0	0	0	—		11	1
Brøndby	Total		50	2	5	0	11	0	0	0	66	2
Lyngby (loan)	2020–21	Danish Superliga	26	4	2	0	—		—		28	4
Miedź Legnica (loan)	2021–22	I liga	10	0	0	0	—		—		10	0
Miedź Legnica (loan)	2022–23	Ekstraklasa	6	0	0	0	—		—		6	0
Miedź Legnica (loan)	Total		16	0	0	0	—		—		16	0
HamKam	2023	Eliteserien	24	2	2	1	—		—		26	3
Silkeborg	2023–24	Danish Superliga	14	0	3	0	—		—		17	0
Silkeborg	2024–25	Danish Superliga	18	2	6	2	2 (Note: Appearances in UEFA Conference League)	0	1 (Note: Appearance in Danish Superliga European play-off match)	0	27	4
Silkeborg	2025–26	Danish Superliga	32	5	3	0	4	1	—		39	6
Silkeborg	2025–26	Danish Superliga	14	2	1	0	—		0	0	15	2
Silkeborg	Total		78	9	13	2	6	1	1	0	98	12
Career total			321	26	28	3	17	1	5	0	351	30

== Honours ==
Miedź Legnica

- I liga: 2021–22

Silkeborg

- Danish Cup: 2023–24
