= Mathilde Juncker =

Danish handball player (born 1993)

Mathilde Rahbek Juncker
Personal information
- Nationality: Danish
- Born: 3 March 1993 (age 33) Roskilde, Denmark
- Height: 1.80 m (5 ft 11 in)

Sport
- Sport: Handball
- Position: Goalkeeper
- Current club: Randers HK
- Number: 1

Youth career
- Years: Team
- HØJ Elite

Senior clubs
- Years: Team
- 2010-2012: FIF
- 2012-2017: SK Aarhus
- 2017-2021: Randers HK
- 2021-2022: Ajax København
- 2022-2023: Viborg HK
National team
Years	Team	Apps	(Gls)
2016-2018	Denmark	11	(0)
Medal record
Youth Olympic Games
Gold medal – first place	2010 Singapore

Mathilde Rahbek Juncker (born 3 March 1993) is a Danish handball, who until 2023 played for Viborg HK. She also played for the Danish national team.

She made her debut for the Danish national team in 2016 in a qualification match for the European Championship against Turkey.
