= 2019 Oceania Women's Youth Handball Championship =

The 2019 Women's Oceania Youth Handball Championship was held in New Caledonia from 11 to 16 August 2019.

The competition participants were host New Caledonia, Australia, New Zealand, French Polynesia, Papua New Guinea and Fiji.

Hosts New Caledonia were the winners over New Zealand. Third was French Polynesia then Australia. Fifth was Papua New Guinea ahead of Fiji on goal difference

== Women's Results ==
=== Pool A ===
Team	Pld	W	D	L	GF	GA	GD	Pts
New Caledonia	5	5	0	0	151	57	+94	10
New Zealand	5	4	0	1	120	65	+55	8
French Polynesia	5	3	0	2	92	86	+6	6
Australia	5	2	0	3	107	110	−3	4
Papua New Guinea	5	0	1	4	54	125	−71	1
Fiji	5	0	1	4	58	139	−81	1

11 August 2019	New Caledonia	42 – 9	Fiji	L'Arène du Sud, Païta, New Caledonia

12 August 2019	Fiji	11 – 22	French Polynesia	L'Arène du Sud, Païta, New Caledonia

New Zealand	27 – 6	Papua New Guinea	L'Arène du Sud, Païta, New Caledonia

Australia	13 – 35	New Caledonia	L'Arène du Sud, Païta, New Caledonia

13 August 2019	French Polynesia	26 – 8	Papua New Guinea	L'Arène du Sud, Païta, New Caledonia

Fiji	13 – 35	Australia	L'Arène du Sud, Païta, New Caledonia

New Caledonia	20 – 16	New Zealand	L'Arène du Sud, Païta, New Caledonia

14 August 2019	New Zealand	23 – 8	Fiji	L'Arène du Sud, Païta, New Caledonia

French Polynesia	18 – 16	Australia	L'Arène du Sud, Païta, New Caledonia

Papua New Guinea	7 – 29	New Caledonia	L'Arène du Sud, Païta, New Caledonia

15 August 2019	Fiji	17 – 17	Papua New Guinea	L'Arène du Sud, Païta, New Caledonia

New Zealand	28 – 17	Australia	L'Arène du Sud, Païta, New Caledonia

French Polynesia	12 – 25	New Caledonia	L'Arène du Sud, Païta, New Caledonia

16 August 2019	Papua New Guinea	16 – 26	Australia	L'Arène du Sud, Païta, New Caledonia

French Polynesia	14 – 26	New Zealand	L'Arène du Sud, Païta, New Caledonia

=== French Pacific Championship ===
15 August 2019	New Caledonia	25 – 12	French Polynesia	L'Arène du Sud, Païta, New Caledonia
15 August 2019		Report (in French)		L'Arène du Sud, Païta, New Caledonia

== Rankings ==
Classification
1st place, gold medalist(s)	New Caledonia
2nd place, silver medalist(s)	New Zealand
3rd place, bronze medalist(s)	French Polynesia
4	Australia
5	Papua New Guinea
6	Fiji
