= Camilla Madsen =

Danish handball player (born 1993)

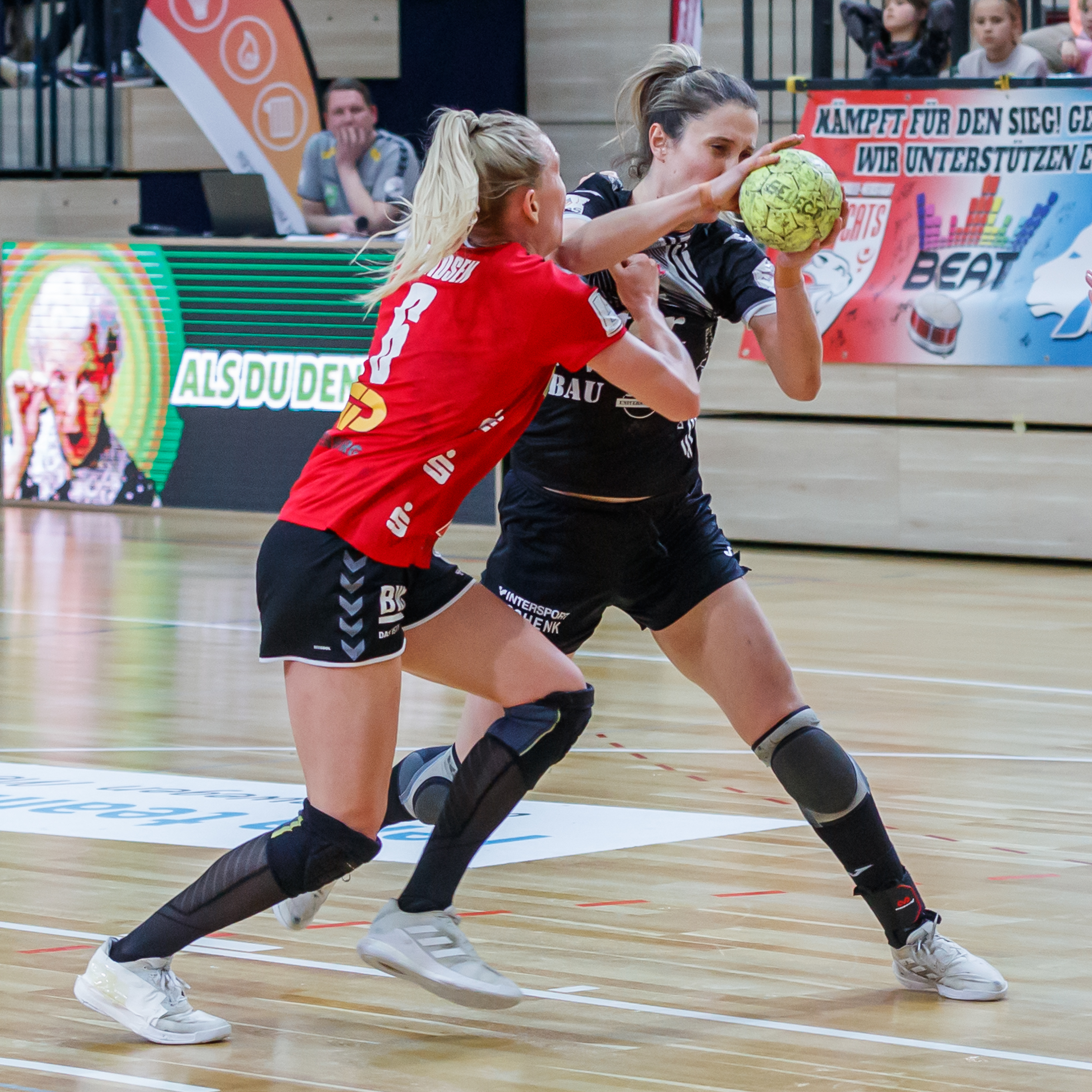
- Camilla Madsen (left) og Asli Iskit - SV Union Halle-Neustadt - Thüringer HC in the German Bundesliga

Personal information
- Full name: Camilla Askebjerg Madsen
- Nationality: Danish
- Born: 24 October 1993 (age 32) Fredericia, Denmark
- Height: 1.75 m (5 ft 9 in)

Sport
- Sport: Handball
- Position: Playmaker
- Current club: Hadsten Håndbold
- Number: 6

Senior clubs
- Years: Team
- 2011-2013: Fredericia HK
- 2014-2014: Vejen EH
- 2014-2015: Horsens HK
- 2015-2017: Fredericia HK
- 2017-2021: HH Elite
- 2021-2022: SV Union Halle-Neustadt (Germany)
- 2023-: Hadsten Håndbold
National team
Years	Team	Apps	(Gls)
–	Denmark (Junior)	11	(16)
Medal record
Youth Olympic Games
Gold medal – first place	2010 Singapore
European Junior Championship
Gold medal – first place	2011 Netherlands

Camilla Madsen (born 24 October 1993) is a Danish handball player who currently plays for Hadsten Håndbold. She missed the 2022/2023 season due to pregnancy.

== Honors ==
- Youth Olympic Games:
  - Winner: 2010
- European Women's U-19 Handball Championship:
  - Winner: 2011
