= 2021 Asian Table Tennis Championships – Women's doubles =

Table tennis competition

Women's doubles at the 2021 Asian Table Tennis Championships
- Venue: Lusail Sports Arena
- Date: October 2, 2021 – October 5, 2021
- Competitors: 60 from 19 nations

The women's doubles at the 2021 Asian Table Tennis Championships in Doha was held at Lusail Sports Arena from 2 to 5 October 2021.

== System of play ==
All individual events shall be played in a knock-out system. Matches in Singles events and Doubles events shall be played in best of five (5) games in all stages of the competition.

== Schedule ==
All times are Arabia Standard Time (UTC+03:00)

Date	Time	Round
Saturday, 2 October 2021	10:30	R2 (1/32)
Saturday, 2 October 2021	15:00	R3 (1/16)
Sunday, 3 October 2021	14:00	Quarterfinals
Tuesday, 5 October 2021	10:00; 10:40	Semifinals
Tuesday, 5 October 2021	15:00	Final

== Main bracket ==
=== Top draw ===
Round of 32
(Mongolia) D Batbayar (Mongolia) B-E Batmunkh	2	5	6	0
(Singapore) Goi RX (Singapore) Zhou J	11	11	11	3
(Maldives) FD Ali (Maldives) A Nazim	11	11	12	3
(Sri Lanka) I Madurangi (Sri Lanka) B Bandara	8	6	10	0
(Nepal) E Maharjan (Nepal) S Suwal	4	4	4	0
7	(Hong Kong) Zhu C (Hong Kong) Ng WN	11	11	11	3
6	(Japan) M Nagasaki (Japan) M Ando	11	11	11	3
(Iran) S Safaei (Iran) M Farei	8	5	8	0
(Pakistan) PZ Khan (Pakistan) H Hassan	2	11	3	8	1
(Indonesia) S Aminah (Indonesia) N Widarahman	11	7	11	11	3
(Kazakhstan) A Lavrova (Kazakhstan) A Bakhyt	2	6	7	0
(India) S Mukherjee (India) A Mukherjee	11	11	11	3
(Qatar) Faramarzi M (Qatar) Mohamed A	6	2	5	0
3	(Chinese Taipei) Chen S-y (Chinese Taipei) Li Y-j	11	11	11	3

Round of 16
1	(South Korea) Jeon J-h (South Korea) Shin Y-b	11	11	11	3
(Singapore) Goi RX (Singapore) Zhou J	4	6	5	0
(Maldives) FD Ali (Maldives) A Nazim	4	4	5	0
7	(Hong Kong) Zhu C (Hong Kong) Ng WN	11	11	11	3
6	(Japan) M Nagasaki (Japan) M Ando	11	11	11	3
(Indonesia) S Aminah (Indonesia) N Widarahman	5	3	7	0
(India) S Mukherjee (India) A Mukherjee	11	12	8	11	3
3	(Chinese Taipei) Chen S-y (Chinese Taipei) Li Y-j	9	10	11	9	1

Quarterfinals
1	(South Korea) Jeon J-h (South Korea) Shin Y-b	11	11	11	3
7	(Hong Kong) Zhu C (Hong Kong) Ng WN	2	5	5	0
6	(Japan) M Nagasaki (Japan) M Ando	11	11	4	7	11	3
(India) S Mukherjee (India) A Mukherjee	4	5	11	11	8	2

Semifinals
1	(South Korea) Jeon J-h (South Korea) Shin Y-b
6	(Japan) M Nagasaki (Japan) M Ando

=== Bottom draw ===
Round of 32
4	(Japan) H Sato (Japan) S Shibata	11	11	9	11	3
(Iran) N Shahsavari (Iran) M Ashtari	6	3	11	7	1
(Qatar) Ali M (Qatar) Ali M	3	4	3	0
(South Korea) Choi H-j (South Korea) Lee Z-o	11	11	11	3
(India) AG Kamath (India) S Akula	11	11	11	3
(Bangladesh) S Sultana (Bangladesh) SR Mou	5	3	6	0
(Jordan) T Abo-Yaman (Jordan) B Al-Wedian	7	3	4	0
5	(Hong Kong) Doo HK (Hong Kong) Lee HC	11	11	11	3
8	(Singapore) Lin Y (Singapore) Wong XR	11	11	11	3
(Kazakhstan) Z Akasheva (Kazakhstan) S Mirkadirova	9	5	6	0
(Thailand) W Tayapitak (Thailand) P Pinyopisan	11	11	11	3
(Maldives) L Ismail (Maldives) MI Mishka	4	5	6	0
(Sri Lanka) T Rodrigo (Sri Lanka) M Salpahdoru	8	5	13	6	1
(Uzbekistan) R Khadjieva (Uzbekistan) M Magdieva	11	11	11	11'	3

Round of 16
4	(Japan) H Sato (Japan) S Shibata	14	11	12	3
(South Korea) Choi H-j (South Korea) Lee Z-o	12	6	10	0
(India) AG Kamath (India) S Akula	10	7	12	13	1
5	(Hong Kong) Doo HK (Hong Kong) Lee HC	12	11	10	15	3
8	(Singapore) Lin Y (Singapore) Wong XR	11	9	11	7	11	3
(Thailand) W Tayapitak (Thailand) P Pinyopisan	6	11	6	11	3	2
(Uzbekistan) R Khadjieva (Uzbekistan) M Magdieva	5	5	11	8	1
2	(Chinese Taipei) Cheng H-t (Chinese Taipei) Liu H-y	11	11	6	11	3

Quarterfinals
4	(Japan) H Sato (Japan) S Shibata	10	11	3	11	10	2
5	(Hong Kong) Doo HK (Hong Kong) Lee HC	12	4	11	4	12	3
8	(Singapore) Lin Y (Singapore) Wong XR	6	11	7	8	1
2	(Chinese Taipei) Cheng H-t (Chinese Taipei) Liu H-y	11	8	11	11	3

Semifinals
5	(Hong Kong) Doo HK (Hong Kong) Lee HC
2	(Chinese Taipei) Cheng H-t (Chinese Taipei) Liu H-y

== Final bracket ==
Quarterfinals								Semifinals						Final
1	(South Korea) Jeon J-h (South Korea) Shin Y-b	11	11	11			3
7	(Hong Kong) Zhu C (Hong Kong) Ng WN	2	5	5			0	1	(South Korea) Jeon J-h (South Korea) Shin Y-b	11	11	11	3
6	(Japan) M Nagasaki (Japan) M Ando	11	11	4	7	11	3	6	(Japan) M Nagasaki (Japan) M Ando	8	8	9	0
	(India) S Mukherjee (India) A Mukherjee	4	5	11	11	8	2							1	(South Korea) Jeon J-h (South Korea) Shin Y-b
4	(Japan) H Sato (Japan) S Shibata	10	11	3	11	10	2							5	(Hong Kong) Doo HK (Hong Kong) Lee HC
5	(Hong Kong) Doo HK (Hong Kong) Lee HC	12	4	11	4	12	3	5	(Hong Kong) Doo HK (Hong Kong) Lee HC	11	11	11	3
8	(Singapore) Lin Y (Singapore) Wong XR	6	11	7	8		1	2	(Chinese Taipei) Cheng H-t (Chinese Taipei) Liu H-y	9	1	3	0
2	(Chinese Taipei) Cheng H-t (Chinese Taipei) Liu H-y	11	8	11	11		3
