= Montenegro at the 2010 Summer Youth Olympics =

- IOC code: MNE
- NOC: Montenegrin Olympic Committee
- Website: www.cokcg.org

in Singapore
- Competitors: 22 in 5 sports
- Flag bearer: Nebojša Kosović
- Medals: Gold 0 Silver 0 Bronze 0 Total 0

Summer Youth Olympics appearances
- 2010; 2014; 2018

Montenegro participated in the 2010 Summer Youth Olympics in Singapore.

Montenegro was represented by 22 athletes competing in 5 sports: Football, Judo, Swimming, Taekwondo and Tennis.

== Football ==
Squad list	Event	Group stage		Semifinal	Bronze-medal match	Rank
Squad list	Event	Group D	Rank	Semifinal	Bronze-medal match	Rank
Marko Kordic; Stefan Vico; Igor Markovic; Danilo Sarkic; Jovan Baosic; Jovan Cadenovic; Nikola Javanovic; Stefan Nedovic; Stevan Krivokapic; Nebojsa Kosovic (C); Zarko Grbovic; Lazar Nikolic; Stefan Kaluderovic; Filip Vukicevic; Milan Vusurovic; Lav Lopicic; Aleksandar Boljevic; Lazar Lalosevic	Boys' Football	Zimbabwe; W 2-1	2 Q	Bolivia; L 1-3	Singapore; L 1-4	4
Marko Kordic; Stefan Vico; Igor Markovic; Danilo Sarkic; Jovan Baosic; Jovan Cadenovic; Nikola Javanovic; Stefan Nedovic; Stevan Krivokapic; Nebojsa Kosovic (C); Zarko Grbovic; Lazar Nikolic; Stefan Kaluderovic; Filip Vukicevic; Milan Vusurovic; Lav Lopicic; Aleksandar Boljevic; Lazar Lalosevic	Boys' Football	Singapore; L 2-3	2 Q	Bolivia; L 1-3	Singapore; L 1-4	4

Group D

Team	Pld	W	D	L	GF	GA	GD	Pts
Singapore	2	2	0	0	6	3	+3	6
Montenegro	2	1	0	1	6	4	−1	3
Zimbabwe	2	0	0	2	2	5	−3	0

Qualified for semifinals

Results

16 August 2010
20:45

Zimbabwe	1 – 2	Montenegro
Chavanigra 81'	Report	Grbović 28'; Boljević 44'

Jalan Besar Stadium, Singapore
Attendance: 1,215
Referee: Banjar Al-Dosari (Qatar)

19 August 2010
20:45

Montenegro	2 – 3	Singapore
Kosović 9', 23' (pen.)	Report	Suhaimi 3'; Lightfoot 25'; Koh 75'

Jalan Besar Stadium, Singapore
Attendance: 5,850
Referee: Wilman Roldan (Colombia)

Semi-finals

22 August 2010
18:00

Bolivia	3 – 1	Montenegro
Sabja 5'; Mejido 56'; Banegas 60'	Report	Boljević 26'

Jalan Besar Stadium, Singapore
Referee: Banjar Al-Dosari (Qatar)

Bronze-medal match

25 August 2010
18:00

Montenegro	1 - 4	Singapore

Jalan Besar Stadium, Singapore

== Judo ==
Individual

Athlete	Event	Round 1	Round 2	Round 3	Semifinals	Final	Rank
Athlete	Event	Opposition Result	Opposition Result	Opposition Result	Opposition Result	Opposition Result	Rank
Rijad Dedeic	Boys' -81 kg	Efemgil (TUR); L 011-102	Repechage; Lim (SIN); W 021-000	Repechage; Ngambomo (COD); W 100-000	Repechage; Efemgil (TUR); L 000-020	Did not advance	7

Team

Team	Event	Round 1	Round 2	Semifinals	Final	Rank
Team	Event	Opposition Result	Opposition Result	Opposition Result	Opposition Result	Rank
Chiba; Dieulourdes Joseph (HAI); Diau Bauro (FIJ); Alexandra Pop (ROU); Phuc Cai (DEN); Sophio Beridze (GEO); Rijad Dedeic (MNE); Ryosuke Igarashi (JPN)	Mixed Team	BYE	Essen; L 2-5	Did not advance		5

== Swimming ==
Athletes	Event	Heat		Semifinal		Final	
Athletes	Event	Time	Position	Time	Position	Time	Position
Katarina Đurđević	Girls’ 50m Breaststroke	35.21	18	Did not advance			
Katarina Đurđević	Girls’ 100m Breaststroke	1:18.21	28	Did not advance			

== Taekwondo ==
Boys

Athlete	Event	Preliminary	Quarterfinal	Semifinal	Final	Rank
Vilson Lajčaj	73 kg		Sirazhov (RUS); L 1–10	Did not advance		=5

== Tennis ==
Athlete	Event	Round of 32		Round of 16		Quarterfinals		Semifinals		Final	
Athlete	Event	Opposition	Score	Opposition	Score	Opposition	Score	Opposition	Score	Opposition	Score
Mia Radulović	Singles Draw	Zarah Razafimahatratra (MAD)	L 0-6;2-6	Did not advance							
Mia Radulović	Singles Consolation Draw	Sofiya Kovalets (UKR)	W/O	Marianne Jodoin (CAN)	W/O	Did not advance					
Mia Radulović (MNE); Denisa Allertova (CZE)	Doubles	Cristina Dinu (ROU); Ons Jabeur (TUN)	L 5-7;6-2;[1]-[10]	Did not advance							
