= Benedikt Röcker =

German footballer (born 1989)

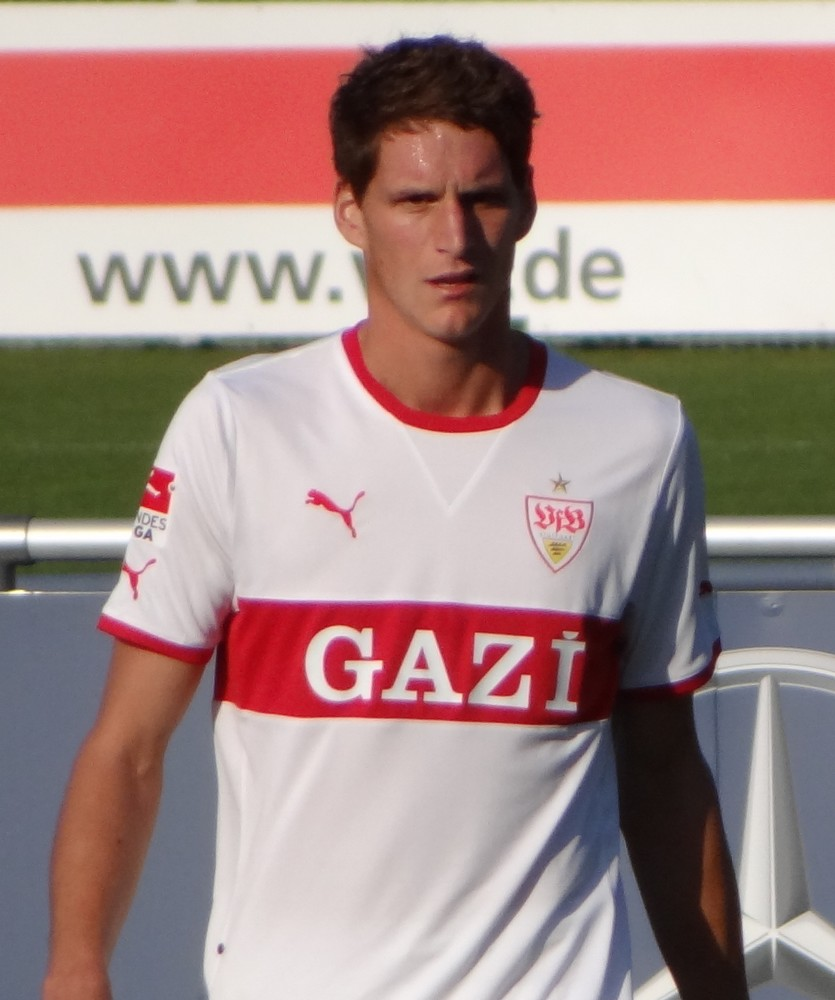
- Röcker with VfB Stuttgart II in 2011

Personal information
- Date of birth: 19 November 1989 (age 36)
- Place of birth: Bietigheim-Bissingen, West Germany
- Height: 1.97 m (6 ft 6 in)
- Position: Centre-back

Youth career
- 1994–2008: FV Löchgau

Senior career*
Years	Team	Apps	(Gls)
2008–2009	FV Löchgau		
2009–2011	Sonnenhof Großaspach	35	(3)
2011–2013	VfB Stuttgart II	81	(4)
2012–2013	VfB Stuttgart	3	(0)
2014–2016	Greuther Fürth	75	(3)
2016–2019	Brøndby	90	(5)
2019–2021	Wehen Wiesbaden	20	(1)
Total		304	(16)
- * Club domestic league appearances and goals

Benedikt Röcker (born 19 November 1989) is a German former professional footballer who played as a centre-back.

Starting his career at lower tier clubs FV Löchgau and Sonnenhof Großaspach in Württemberg, Röcker moved to VfB Stuttgart in 2011, where he became a regular for the second team. After a two-year stint at Greuther Fürth, he moved to Danish Superliga club Brøndby, where he challenged for the league title, appeared in the UEFA Europa League and won the Danish Cup under fellow German, head coach Alexander Zorniger, before becoming team captain in 2019. Röcker left the club in 2019, and joined Wehen Wiesbaden where he played for two seasons before retiring.

== Career ==
=== Early years ===
Born in Bietigheim-Bissingen, Baden-Württemberg, Röcker played in his youth at local club FV Löchgau. There, he progressed through the youth system until reaching the senior team, where he played in the 2008–09 season in the lower-tier Landesliga Württemberg. In 2009, he moved to the Regionalliga Süd to play for Sonnenhof Großaspach. In October 2009, he won the Länderpokal, a regional cup competition, with a team consisting of lower-tier players from Württemberg.

On 31 January 2011, Röcker moved to the reserve team of VfB Stuttgart. He made his professional debut on 22 February in a match for VfB Stuttgart II in the 3. Liga against 1. FC Heidenheim.

=== VfB Stuttgart ===
Röcker made his debut for the first team of VfB Stuttgart on 6 December 2012 during the 2012–13 UEFA Europa League group stage against Molde FK. On 15 December 2012, he made his Bundesliga debut against 1. FSV Mainz 05. On 10 January 2013, Röcker extended his contract with VfB Stuttgart until June 2015.

=== Greuther Fürth ===
In January 2014, Röcker moved to second tier club Greuther Fürth. He won his maiden first team call-up for Fürth's league match at home versus Karlsruher SC on 14 February. He played all 90 minutes and scored the equaliser in the 1–1 draw.

=== Brøndby ===
In June 2016, Röcker moved to Danish Superliga club Brøndby IF on a three-year contract. The move reunited him with his former Sonnenhof Großaspach coach Alexander Zorniger. Röcker quickly established himself in the starting lineup, and was part of a team knocking out Hibernian and Hertha BSC in his first months at the club in the UEFA Europa League qualifiers, before losing over two legs to Greek club Panathinaikos in the play-off round. He made 46 total appearances during his first season at the club, in which the club finished in second place in the Superliga and reached the Danish Cup final, where they lost 3–1 to rivals FC Copenhagen.

In the following season, Röcker was again a starter in central defense, this time alongside Hjörtur Hermannsson or Paulus Arajuuri, as Brøndby were contenders for the league title throughout the season. However, in decisive games against eventual champions FC Midtjylland, as well as AC Horsens, Brøndby's lead in the table was lost and they finished in second place. They had more success in the Danish Cup, with Röcker scoring a crucial goal as Brøndby beat Silkeborg IF 3–1 in the final to claim the trophy. Personally, he had a strong season with 40 total appearances in which he scored five goals.

In January 2019, Röcker was appointed team captain of Brøndby following the departure of Johan Larsson. He was, however, benched in the second half of the season, as Brøndby dismissed head coach Zorniger and the club finished in fourth place. Röcker made 25 appearances during his final season at the club in which he scored one goal, as his contract expired at the end of the season.

=== Wehen Wiesbaden ===
On 13 June 2019, Röcker joined newly promoted 2. Bundesliga club SV Wehen Wiesbaden on a two-year contract, on a free transfer. He made 21 total appearances during the season in which he scored one goal, as Wehen Wiesbaden finished 17th in the league table and suffered relegation to the 3. Liga.

Röcker was sidelined at the start of the new season due to patellar tendinitis in his right knee, and in November 2020 further examination showed that he had suffered cartilage damage which required surgery. The injury kept him out indefinitely.

On 24 June 2021, Röcker announced his retirement from professional football after making no appearances during the 2020–21 season. He stated that the decision was "unavoidable" due to his injury.

== Honours ==
Brøndby

- Danish Cup: 2017–18; runner-up: 2018–19
