= Yevgeniya Latkina =

Kazakhstani handball player

Personal information
- Nationality: Kazakhstani
- Born: March 14, 1992 (age 34)
- Height: 178 cm (70 in)

Sport
- Sport: Handball

Senior clubs
- Years: Team
- –: ILI
National team
- Years: Team
- –: Kazakhstan

Yevgeniya Latkina (born 14 March 1992) is a team handball player from Kazakhstan. She has played on the Kazakhstan women's national handball team, and participated at the 2009 and 2011 World Women's Handball Championship in Brazil.
