= Gregers Arndal-Lauritzen =

Danish footballer (born 1998)

Personal information
- Full name: Gregers Arndal-Lauritzen
- Date of birth: 3 May 1998 (age 28)
- Place of birth: Denmark
- Height: 1.88 m (6 ft 2 in)
- Position: Left-back

Youth career
- Søllerød-Vedbæk
- 2011–2017: Brøndby

Senior career*
Years	Team	Apps	(Gls)
2017–2019	Brøndby	0	(0)
2018	→ HB Køge (loan)	13	(1)
2019	Horsens	0	(0)
2019–2021	Skovshoved	33	(1)
2021–2022	HIK	29	(3)
2022–2026	Hillerød	95	(2)

International career
2014–2015	Denmark U17	2	(0)
2015–2016	Denmark U18	3	(0)
2016–2017	Denmark U19	2	(0)
2018	Denmark U20	2	(0)
- * Club domestic league appearances and goals

Gregers Arndal-Lauritzen (Danish: [ˈkʁeˀkɐs ˈɑːnˌtɛˀl ˈlɑwʁitsn̩]; born 3 May 1998) is a former Danish footballer who played as a left-back.

== Club career ==
Arndal-Lauritzen started playing for BK Søllerød-Vedbæk before signing a youth contract with Brøndby IF, joining the club's under-14 team. On 20 July 2017, Arndal-Lauritzen first appeared on the first-team bench during the 2017–18 season, in a 1–2 UEFA Europa League qualifier loss to Finnish club VPS. On 21 September 2017, he made his first appearance for Brøndby, starting in the Danish Cup match against Ledøje-Smørum Fodbold, which Brøndby won 5–1.

On 28 December 2017, Arndal-Lauritzen moved to second division club HB Køge on loan until the end of the 2017–18 season. He subsequently stated that he "came to play" and needed playing time in order to evolve as a player. He made his first-team debut for HB Køge on 11 March, making his first ever league start and scoring his first first-team goal in the 34th minute of a 3–2 win home over Thisted FC. He ended the season scoring one goal in 13 matches.

Arndal-Lauritzen and Brøndby agreed to terminate the players contract on 31 January 2019. On 11 February 2019, he then signed with AC Horsens on a six-month contract.

In October 2019, Arndal-Lauritzen started playing for third-tier club Skovshoved IF in the Danish 2nd Division. On 11 June 2021, Arndal-Lauritzen moved to fellow league club Hellerup IK. In July 2022, Arndal-Lauritzen moved to newly promoted Danish 1st Division club Hillerød.

On 29 May 2026, Arndal-Lauritzen announced that he will retire and commit him to civil career.
