= Valance Nambishi =

Danish footballer (born 1997)

Personal information
- Date of birth: 30 November 1997 (age 28)
- Place of birth: Lusaka, Zambia
- Height: 1.82 m (6 ft 0 in)
- Position: Midfielder

Youth career
- Åstrup/Hammelev Fodbold
- Silkeborg

Senior career*
Years	Team	Apps	(Gls)
2018–2021	Silkeborg	36	(0)
2021–2023	Fredericia	46	(3)
- * Club domestic league appearances and goals as of 16:28, 19 July 2023 (UTC)

Valance Nambishi (born 30 November 1997) is a Zambian professional footballer.

== Career ==
Nambishi was born in Lusaka, Zambia, but is of Congolese background. He came with his mother to Denmark, an grew up in Hammel. He began playing football at Åstrup/Hammelev Fodbold before moving to the youth academy of Silkeborg IF.

On 15 January 2021 it was confirmed, that Nambishi would join FC Fredericia on 1 July 2021, when his contract with Silkeborg expired. He left the club at the end of the 2022–23 season.

== Honours ==
Silkeborg

- Danish 1st Division: 2019–20
