= Handball at the 2010 Summer Youth Olympics – Girls' tournament =

Girls' handball at the I Summer Youth Games
Tournament details
- Host country: Singapore
- Venue: 1 (in 1 host city)
- Dates: 20–25 August
- Teams: 6 (from 4 confederations)

Final positions
- Champions: Denmark (1st title)
- Runners-up: Russia
- Third place: Brazil
- Fourth place: Kazakhstan

Tournament statistics
- Matches played: 12
- Goals scored: 673 (56.08 per match)

The girls' handball tournament at the 2010 Summer Youth Olympics in Singapore was held from 20 to 25 August at the Suntec Singapore Convention and Exhibition Centre.

== Participating teams ==
Group A

- Angola
- Brazil
- Russia

Group B

- Australia
- Denmark
- Kazakhstan

== Preliminary round ==
=== Group A ===
Pos	Team	Pld	W	D	L	GF	GA	GD	Pts	Qualification
1	Russia	2	2	0	0	76	42	+34	4	Semifinals
2	Brazil	2	1	0	1	50	62	−12	2	Semifinals
3	Angola	2	0	0	2	49	71	−22	0	5th place game

Source: Singapore 2010
Rules for classification: 1) points; 2) head-to-head points; 3) head-to-head goal difference; 4) head-to-head number of goals scored; 5) goal difference.

20 August 2010; 14:00	Brazil	20–35	Russia	Suntec Singapore Convention and Exhibition Centre; Referees: Bonaventura, Bonaventura (France)
20 August 2010; 14:00	De Araújo 5	(8–15)	four players 4	Suntec Singapore Convention and Exhibition Centre; Referees: Bonaventura, Bonaventura (France)
20 August 2010; 14:00	2× (yellow card) 3× (suspension) 1× (red card)	Report	2× (yellow card) 1× (suspension)	Suntec Singapore Convention and Exhibition Centre; Referees: Bonaventura, Bonaventura (France)

21 August 2010; 14:00	Angola	27–30	Brazil	Suntec Singapore Convention and Exhibition Centre; Referees: Hizari, Ikebuchi (Japan)
21 August 2010; 14:00	Mambrio 7	(16–16)	Da Rocha 7	Suntec Singapore Convention and Exhibition Centre; Referees: Hizari, Ikebuchi (Japan)
21 August 2010; 14:00	3× (yellow card) 5× (suspension)	Report	3× (yellow card) 2× (suspension)	Suntec Singapore Convention and Exhibition Centre; Referees: Hizari, Ikebuchi (Japan)

22 August 2010; 14:00	Russia	41–22	Angola	Suntec Singapore Convention and Exhibition Centre; Referees: Eliasson, Gudjonsson (Iceland)
22 August 2010; 14:00	Chernobrovina, Danshina 7	(22–10)	Luis, Mambrio 6	Suntec Singapore Convention and Exhibition Centre; Referees: Eliasson, Gudjonsson (Iceland)
22 August 2010; 14:00	3× (yellow card) 4× (suspension)	Report	2× (yellow card) 3× (suspension)	Suntec Singapore Convention and Exhibition Centre; Referees: Eliasson, Gudjonsson (Iceland)

=== Group B ===
Pos	Team	Pld	W	D	L	GF	GA	GD	Pts	Qualification
1	Denmark	2	2	0	0	81	19	+62	4	Semifinals
2	Kazakhstan	2	1	0	1	60	56	+4	2	Semifinals
3	Australia	2	0	0	2	20	86	−66	0	5th place game

Source: Singapore 2010
Rules for classification: 1) points; 2) head-to-head points; 3) head-to-head goal difference; 4) head-to-head number of goals scored; 5) goal difference.

20 August 2010; 15:45	Australia	4–41	Denmark	Suntec Singapore Convention and Exhibition Centre; Referees: Schaller, Wutzler (Germany)
20 August 2010; 15:45	Fletcher 2	(3–21)	Pedersen, Skals 7	Suntec Singapore Convention and Exhibition Centre; Referees: Schaller, Wutzler (Germany)
20 August 2010; 15:45	3× (yellow card) 5× (suspension)	Report	2× (yellow card) 1× (suspension)	Suntec Singapore Convention and Exhibition Centre; Referees: Schaller, Wutzler (Germany)

21 August 2010; 15:45	Kazakhstan	45–16	Australia	Suntec Singapore Convention and Exhibition Centre; Referees: Krichene, Makhlouf (Tunisia)
21 August 2010; 15:45	Latkina 18	(20–8)	Najdovski 5	Suntec Singapore Convention and Exhibition Centre; Referees: Krichene, Makhlouf (Tunisia)
21 August 2010; 15:45	3× (yellow card) 5× (suspension)	Report	3× (yellow card) 7× (suspension)	Suntec Singapore Convention and Exhibition Centre; Referees: Krichene, Makhlouf (Tunisia)

22 August 2010; 14:45	Denmark	40–15	Kazakhstan	Suntec Singapore Convention and Exhibition Centre; Referees: da Costa, da Costa (Brazil)
22 August 2010; 14:45	Pedersen 7	(18–9)	Kurassova, Latkina 5	Suntec Singapore Convention and Exhibition Centre; Referees: da Costa, da Costa (Brazil)
22 August 2010; 14:45	3× (yellow card) 5× (suspension)	Report	2× (yellow card) 3× (suspension)	Suntec Singapore Convention and Exhibition Centre; Referees: da Costa, da Costa (Brazil)

== Knockout stage ==
=== Fifth place game ===
23 August 2010; 13:00	Angola	37–12	Australia	Suntec Singapore Convention and Exhibition Centre; Referees: Krichene, Makhlouf (Tunisia)
23 August 2010; 13:00	Kanka 11	(15–9)	Fletcher 5	Suntec Singapore Convention and Exhibition Centre; Referees: Krichene, Makhlouf (Tunisia)
23 August 2010; 13:00	3× (yellow card) 1× (suspension)	Report	3× (yellow card) 8× (suspension)	Suntec Singapore Convention and Exhibition Centre; Referees: Krichene, Makhlouf (Tunisia)

24 August 2010; 13:00	Australia	12–39	Angola	Suntec Singapore Convention and Exhibition Centre; Referees: Eliasson, Gudjonsson (Iceland)
24 August 2010; 13:00	Cash, Fletcher 3	(8–16)	Kanka 11	Suntec Singapore Convention and Exhibition Centre; Referees: Eliasson, Gudjonsson (Iceland)
24 August 2010; 13:00	2× (yellow card) 4× (suspension)	Report	2× (yellow card)	Suntec Singapore Convention and Exhibition Centre; Referees: Eliasson, Gudjonsson (Iceland)

Angola win 76–24 on aggregate

=== Semifinals ===
23 August 2010; 15:00	Russia	41–19	Kazakhstan	Suntec Singapore Convention and Exhibition Centre; Referees: Hizaki, Ikebuchi (Japan)
23 August 2010; 15:00	Chopikyan, Garanina 7	(18–10)	Ulumbetova 5	Suntec Singapore Convention and Exhibition Centre; Referees: Hizaki, Ikebuchi (Japan)
23 August 2010; 15:00	3× (yellow card) 3× (suspension)	Report	3× (yellow card) 4× (suspension) 1× (red card)	Suntec Singapore Convention and Exhibition Centre; Referees: Hizaki, Ikebuchi (Japan)

23 August 2010; 18:00	Brazil	25–30	Denmark	Suntec Singapore Convention and Exhibition Centre; Referees: Bonaventura, Bonaventura (France)
23 August 2010; 18:00	three players 3	(12–18)	Pedersen 9	Suntec Singapore Convention and Exhibition Centre; Referees: Bonaventura, Bonaventura (France)
23 August 2010; 18:00	2× (yellow card) 5× (suspension)	Report	3× (yellow card) 2× (suspension)	Suntec Singapore Convention and Exhibition Centre; Referees: Bonaventura, Bonaventura (France)

=== Bronze medal game ===
25 August 2010; 13:00	Kazakhstan	23–45	Brazil	Suntec Singapore Convention and Exhibition Centre; Referees: Hizaki, Ikebuchi (Japan)
25 August 2010; 13:00	Latkina 11	(12–24)	Da Rocha 13	Suntec Singapore Convention and Exhibition Centre; Referees: Hizaki, Ikebuchi (Japan)
25 August 2010; 13:00	2× (yellow card) 1× (suspension)	Report	2× (yellow card) 3× (suspension)	Suntec Singapore Convention and Exhibition Centre; Referees: Hizaki, Ikebuchi (Japan)

=== Final ===
25 August 2010; 18:00	Russia	26–28	Denmark	Suntec Singapore Convention and Exhibition Centre; Referees: Eliasson, Gudjonsson (Iceland)
25 August 2010; 18:00	Danshina 7	(15–11)	Pedersen 7	Suntec Singapore Convention and Exhibition Centre; Referees: Eliasson, Gudjonsson (Iceland)
25 August 2010; 18:00	2× (yellow card) 4× (suspension)	Report	4× (yellow card) 5× (suspension)	Suntec Singapore Convention and Exhibition Centre; Referees: Eliasson, Gudjonsson (Iceland)

== Final ranking ==
Rank	Team
1st place, gold medalist(s)	Denmark
2nd place, silver medalist(s)	Russia
3rd place, bronze medalist(s)	Brazil
4	Kazakhstan
5	Angola
6	Australia
