= Alexander Zorniger =

German football manager (born 1967)

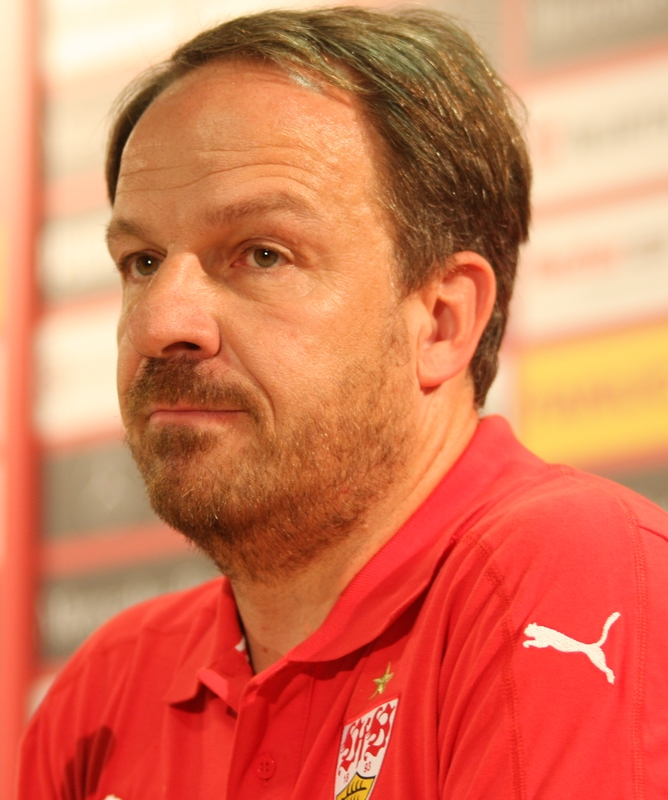
- Zorniger in 2015

Personal information
- Date of birth: 8 October 1967 (age 59)
- Place of birth: Mutlangen, West Germany
- Position: Midfielder

Senior career*
Years	Team	Apps	(Gls)
1996–2000	SV Bonlanden	0	(0)

Managerial career
- 2002–2009: 1. FC Normannia Gmünd
- 2010–2012: SG Sonnenhof Großaspach
- 2012–2015: RB Leipzig
- 2015: VfB Stuttgart
- 2016–2019: Brøndby
- 2021–2022: Apollon Limassol
- 2022–2024: Greuther Fürth
- 2025–2026: OB
- * Club domestic league appearances and goals

Alexander Zorniger (born 8 October 1967) is a German professional football manager who was most recently the head coach of Danish Superliga club OB.

== Coaching career ==
=== Early career ===
Zorniger started his coaching career with stints as head coach of Normannia Gmünd, assistant coach at VfB Stuttgart, and as head coach at Sonnenhof Großaspach.

=== RB Leipzig ===
Zorniger became head coach of RB Leipzig on 3 July 2012. He managed the club to an undefeated season in all competitions. They finished the league season with 21 wins and 9 draws and went on to the promotion play–off; winning the first leg 2–0 and drawing the second leg 2–2. They also defeated Chemnitzer FC in the Saxony Cup final. He resigned on 11 February 2015, as earlier that month Ralf Rangnick announced that he would be RB Leipzig's coach for next season.

=== Back to VfB Stuttgart ===
On 25 May 2015, VfB Stuttgart announced in a press conference that Zorniger would be their new head coach and signed a deal with the Swabians until Summer 2018. He was sacked on 24 November 2015 after Stuttgart lost to FC Augsburg 4–0. He finished with a record of five wins, one draw, and nine losses.

=== Brøndby ===
On 17 May 2016, Danish Superliga club Brøndby announced that Zorniger had been appointed head coach on a two-year contract. He made his competitive debut on 30 June with a 4–1 away win over Icelandic side Valur in the first qualifying round of the UEFA Europa League, and Brøndby won the home leg 6–0 to advance 10–1 on aggregate. On 17 July 2016, Zorniger oversaw his Superliga debut, a 4–0 home win against Esbjerg fB. In the third qualifying round of the Europa League Brøndby eliminated Hertha BSC 3–2 on aggregate, overturning a 1–0 first-leg defeat in Berlin with a 3–1 victory at home. On 21 August Brøndby defeated AGF 7–0 at Ceres Park, the heaviest defeat in AGF's Superliga history, and a 1–1 home draw against rivals Copenhagen later that month sent Brøndby into the first international break of the season at the top of the table on goal difference. His first league defeat came on 18 September 2016 in a 2–1 home loss to Viborg.

Brøndby finished the 2016–17 season as runners-up, the club's highest league placing since 2005–06. The following season marked the peak of Zorniger's tenure. On 10 May 2018 Brøndby won the Danish Cup with a 3–1 victory over Silkeborg in the final, securing the club's first major trophy in 13 years. In the league, Brøndby led the table for long periods but, having been two goals ahead away to Horsens in the penultimate round, conceded twice in stoppage time to draw 2–2, a result that allowed Copenhagen to overtake them and win the title; Brøndby again finished second and missed out on what would have been their first championship since 2005.

During the 2018–19 season Brøndby were unable to reproduce their previous form and trailed the leading clubs in the Superliga. On 18 February 2019, with the team in third place following a home defeat to Esbjerg, the club announced that Zorniger had been relieved of his duties. According to sporting director Ebbe Sand, the board no longer believed that he was the right coach to implement the club's long-term strategy, known as "Strategy 6.4", and felt that elements of the so-called "Brøndby DNA" were lacking in his playing style. Zorniger was also criticised in the Danish media and among some supporters for occasionally fielding starting line-ups consisting entirely of foreign players, which was seen by critics as conflicting with the club's ambition to develop home-grown talent.

=== Apollon Limassol ===
In December 2019, Zorniger was appointed head coach of Apollon Limassol in the Cypriot First Division. He led the club to the 2021–22 league title, Apollon's first championship in over a decade. After the club were eliminated in the third qualifying round of the 2022–23 UEFA Champions League in August 2022, he was dismissed.

=== Greuther Fürth ===
After leaving Cyprus, Zorniger returned to Germany in October 2022 to take charge of Greuther Fürth. At the time, Fürth were bottom of the 2. Bundesliga with one of the youngest squads in the league, but Zorniger guided the team to ten points from his first four matches, lifting them to tenth place by the winter break. On 27 November 2023, with the club placed fifth, Fürth announced a contract extension with Zorniger until June 2026.

Following a poor run of form early in the 2024–25 season—including five winless matches and a 4–0 defeat to 1. FC Nürnberg—the club dismissed both Zorniger and sporting director Rachid Azzouzi on 22 October 2024, with Fürth stating that they wished to take the team in a new direction.

=== OB ===
On 31 May 2025, newly promoted Danish Superliga club OB announced that Zorniger would become their head coach for the 2025–26 season, marking his return to Danish football more than six years after his departure from Brøndby.

Zorniger was dismissed on 30 July 2026, just one match into the 2026–27 season. OB stated that the decision was due to "collaboration difficulties and a lack of support for the club's direction and ambitions."

== Style of management ==
Zorniger's coaching philosophy is closely associated with the high-intensity pressing model developed in the Red Bull football network. During his time at RB Leipzig, he typically used a narrow, vertical 4–4–2 or 4–2–2–2 system built around aggressive Gegenpressing, rapid transitions and a high defensive line, with an emphasis on forcing mistakes rather than patient possession play. Analysts in Denmark later summarised his Brøndby philosophy with the phrase "create chaos, exploit chaos", reflecting his preference for attacking immediately after regaining possession and keeping the game at a high tempo.

At VfB Stuttgart and Leipzig, Zorniger's teams were noted for some of the highest running and sprint metrics in their leagues and for committing large numbers forward in pressing and attacking phases, drawing comparisons in the German press with the approach of Roger Schmidt. The same sources, however, also criticised his tactics as "naive" when the press was broken, highlighting the space left behind a very high back line and the vulnerability to counter-attacks if the collective movement and distances were not executed perfectly. This tension between attacking output and defensive exposure has been a recurring theme in media assessments of his work.

When he took over Brøndby in 2016, Zorniger imported the same high-pressure, transition-oriented style into the Danish Superliga. Brøndby's own season review described the approach with the slogan "Aktion, aktion, aktion", noting that training sessions under Zorniger were characterised by continuous activity and physical demands, with players required to jog or do push-ups between exercises. His Brøndby side quickly became known for a high tempo, aggressive counter-pressing and a direct attacking game that produced heavy wins and high scoring totals, but also attracted criticism for defensive instability and, at times, for fielding line-ups without any homegrown players, which some observers felt was at odds with the club's traditional identity and emphasis on youth development.

Later in his career, particularly at Greuther Fürth, reporting in Germany suggested a degree of evolution in Zorniger's approach. While kicker characterised his counter-pressing as the area where he remained "der Alte" ("the same as ever"), it also highlighted his focus on structuring a very young squad, improving defensive organisation and balancing his high-risk pressing game with greater stability. At Fürth he was also frequently portrayed as a demanding, outspoken motivator who expected high work-rate and resilience from his players, but who simultaneously spoke about shielding young footballers from external pressure and concentrating criticism and performance demands within the professional environment.

== Coaching record ==
As of 24 July 2026

Team	From	To	Record					
Team	From	To	G	W	D	L	Win %	Ref.
Sonnenhof Großaspach	1 July 2010	30 June 2012	64	29	15	20	45.31	
RB Leipzig	3 July 2012	11 February 2015	96	58	25	13	60.42	
VfB Stuttgart	29 June 2015	24 November 2015	15	5	1	9	33.33	
Brøndby	1 June 2016	18 February 2019	84	51	16	17	60.71	
Apollon Limassol	1 July 2021	10 August 2022	39	19	11	9	48.72	
Greuther Fürth	24 October 2022	21 October 2024	66	27	16	23	40.91	
OB	1 July 2025	30 July 2026	38	15	8	15	39.47	
Total			402	204	92	106	50.75	—

== Honours ==
=== As manager ===
RB Leipzig

- 3. Liga runners-up: 2013–14
- Regionalliga Nordost: 2012–13
- Saxony Cup: 2012–13

Brøndby

- Danish Cup: 2017–18

Apollon Limassol

- First Division: 2021–22
