= 2021–22 F.C. Copenhagen season =

F.C. Copenhagen
2021–22 season
- Chairman: Bo Rygaard
- Head coach: Jess Thorup
- Stadium: Parken Stadium
- Danish Superliga: 1st
- Danish Cup: Third round
- UEFA Europa Conference League: Round of 16
- Top goalscorer: League: Pep Biel (11); All: Pep Biel (18)
Home colours	Away colours	Third colours

The 2021–22 F.C. Copenhagen season was the club's 30th season in existence and the 30th consecutive season in the top flight of Danish football. In addition to the domestic league, Copenhagen participated in this season's editions of the Danish Cup and the inaugural UEFA Europa Conference League. The season covered the period from 1 July 2021 to 30 June 2022.

== Players ==
=== First-team squad ===
As of 30 March 2022

No.	Player	Nationality	Position	Since	Date of birth	Signed from
Goalkeepers
1	Kamil Grabara	(Poland)	GK	2021	8 January 1999	(England) Liverpool
21	Karl-Johan Johnsson	(Sweden)	GK	2019	28 January 1990	(France) Guingamp
31	Johan Guadagno	(Sweden)	GK	2021	21 February 2003	(England) Manchester United
Defenders
2	Kevin Diks	(Netherlands)	RB	2021	6 October 1996	(Italy) Fiorentina
3	Denis Vavro	(Slovakia)	LB	2022	10 April 1996	(Italy) Lazio
5	Davit Khocholava	(Georgia (country))	CB	2021	8 February 1993	(Ukraine) Shakhtar
19	Bryan Oviedo	(Costa Rica)	LB	2019	18 February 1990	(England) Sunderland
20	Nicolai Boilesen	(Denmark)	LB	2016	16 February 1992	(Netherlands) Ajax
22	Peter Ankersen	(Denmark)	RB	2020	22 September 1990	(Italy) Genoa
26	Marios Oikonomou	(Greece)	CB	2020	6 October 1992	(Greece) AEK Athens
27	Valdemar Lund	(Denmark)	CB	2021	28 May 2003	(Denmark) Homegrown
34	Victor Kristiansen	(Denmark)	LB	2021	16 December 2002	(Denmark) Homegrown
Midfielders
6	Jens Stage	(Denmark)	MF	2019	8 November 1996	(Denmark) Aarhus
7	Luther Singh	(South Africa)	FW	2021	5 August 1997	(Portugal) S.C. Braga
8	Ísak Bergmann Jóhannesson	(Iceland)	MF	2021	23 March 2003	(Sweden) IFK Norrköping
10	Zeca (captain)	(Greece)	MF	2017	31 Aug 1988	(Greece) Panathinaikos
12	Lukas Lerager	(Denmark)	MF	2021	12 July 1993	(Italy) Genoa
15	Viktor Claesson	(Sweden)	MF	2022	2 January 1992	(Russia) Krasnodar
16	Pep Biel	(Spain)	MF	2019	5 September 1996	(Spain) Zaragoza
17	Paul Mukairu	(Nigeria)	FW	2022	18 January 2000	(Turkey) Antalyaspor
18	Andri Baldursson	(Iceland)	MF	2021	10 January 2002	(Italy) Bologna (on loan)
23	Akinkunmi Amoo	(Nigeria)	FW	2022	7 June 2002	(Sweden) Hammarby
24	William Bøving	(Denmark)	FW	2021	1 March 2003	(Denmark) Homegrown
30	Hákon Arnar Haraldsson	(Iceland)	MF	2021	10 April 2003	(Denmark) Homegrown
33	Rasmus Falk	(Denmark)	MF	2016	15 January 1992	(Denmark) Odense
Forwards
9	Nicolai Jørgensen	(Denmark)	FW	2022	15 January 1991	(Turkey) Kasımpaşa
11	Khouma Babacar	(Senegal)	FW	2022	17 March 1993	(Italy) Sassuolo
29	Mamoudou Karamoko	(France)	FW	2022	8 September 1999	(Austria) LASK

=== Youth players in use ===
Note: Flags indicate national team as defined under FIFA eligibility rules; some limited exceptions apply. Players may hold more than one non-FIFA nationality.

No.	Pos.	Nation	Player
37	DF	DEN	Mattias Jakobsen (from FC Copenhagen U19)
38	DF	DEN	Elias Jelert (from FC Copenhagen U19)
39	MF	DEN	Daniel Haarbo (from FC Copenhagen U19)

No.	Pos.	Nation	Player
40	MF	SWE	Roony Bardghji (from FC Copenhagen U19)
41	GK	DEN	Andreas Dithmer (from FC Copenhagen U19)

=== Out on loan ===
Note: Flags indicate national team as defined under FIFA eligibility rules; some limited exceptions apply. Players may hold more than one non-FIFA nationality.

No.	Pos.	Nation	Player
—	MF	CRO	Robert Mudražija (at (Croatia) HNK Rijeka until 30 June 2022)
—	FW	DEN	Mikkel Kaufmann (at (Germany) Hamburger SV until 30 June 2022)

No.	Pos.	Nation	Player
—	DF	DEN	Andreas Bjelland (at (Denmark) Lyngby until 30 June 2022)
—	MF	NZL	Marko Stamenić (at (Denmark) HB Køge until 30 June 2022)

== Non-competitive ==
=== Pre-season ===
24 June 2021	Copenhagen	1–1	Hvidovre	Frederiksberg
14:00 CEST	Pep Biel 86'	FCK Summary	Thomsen 50'	Stadium: Nummer 10; Referee: Jesper Nielsen

29 June 2021	Copenhagen	3–1	Lyngby	Frederiksberg
12:00 CEST	Lerager 23'; Højlund 29'; Bøving 74'	FCK Summary	Winther 70'	Stadium: Nummer 10; Attendance: 0 Referee: Jakob A. Sundberg

5 July 2021	CSKA Moscow (Russia)	0–1	Copenhagen	Bad Tatzmannsdorf, Austria
18:00 CEST		FCK Summary	Højlund 31'	Stadium: Fussballarena Bad Tatzmannsdorf

10 July 2021	Rapid Wien (Austria)	1–0	Copenhagen	Vienna, Austria
1 8:30CEST	Kara 65'	FCK Summary	Diks (yellow card) 81'	Stadium: Allianz Stadion; Attendance: 7,500

=== Mid-season ===
19 January 2022	Copenhagen	3–1	Hvidovre	Frederiksberg
14:30 CEST	Óskarsson 25'; Haraldsson 70'; Pep Biel 80'	FCK Summary	Fredslund 60'	Stadium: Nummer 10; Referee: Jonas Hansen

24 January 2022	Copenhagen	3–2	Helsingør	Frederiksberg
12:00 CEST	Khocholava 49'; Óskarsson 75'; Knudsen 83' (o.g.)	FCK Summary	Jordan 32'; Bill 85'	Stadium: Nummer 10; Attendance: 0 Referee: Jakob A. Sundberg

29 January 2022	Copenhagen	3–0	(Estonia) FC Flora	Frederiksberg
13:00 CEST	Bardghji 27'; Hussar 32' (o.g.); Lipp 36' (o.g.)	FCK Summary		Stadium: Nummer 10; Attendance: 0 Referee: Anders Poulsen

=== Atlantic Cup ===
5 February 2022	Halmstad (Sweden)	1–2	Copenhagen	Albufeira, Portugal
15:00 GMT	Ahlstrand 43'	FCK Report	Karamoko 41'; Pep Biel 62' (pen.)	Stadium: Estádio Municipal de Albufeira; Referee: Bruno Vieira (Portugal)

10 February 2022	Copenhagen	1–1 (2–3 p)	(Russia) FC Zenit	Almancil, Portugal
15:00 GMT	Bøving 73'	FCK Report	unknown goalscorer	Stadium: Estádio Algarve; Attendance: 0

11 February 2022	Breiðablik UBK (Iceland)	3–4	Copenhagen	Albufeira, Portugal
16:00 GMT	Eyjólfsson 11'; Gunnlaugsson 31'; Steindórsson 89'	FCK Summary	Karamoko 66'; E. Højlund 69'; Jóhannesson 74', 83'	Stadium: Estádio Municipal de Albufeira; Referee: Goncalo Neves (Portugal)

== Competitions ==
=== Competition record ===
Competition	Record							
Competition	G	W	D	L	GF	GA	GD	Win %
Superliga	32	20	8	4	56	19	+37	62.50
Danish Cup	1	0	0	1	0	3	−3	0.00
Europa Conference League	14	10	2	2	40	18	+22	71.43
Total	47	30	10	7	96	40	+56	63.83

Last updated: complete.
Source: Competitive matches

=== Superliga ===
==== Regular season ====
Pos	Team	Pld	W	D	L	GF	GA	GD	Pts	Qualification
1	Copenhagen	22	14	6	2	43	13	+30	48	Qualification for the Championship round
2	Midtjylland	22	13	3	6	37	22	+15	42	Qualification for the Championship round
3	Brøndby	22	11	7	4	30	24	+6	40	Qualification for the Championship round
4	AaB	22	11	5	6	36	26	+10	38	Qualification for the Championship round
5	Randers	22	9	6	7	26	25	+1	33	Qualification for the Championship round

Source: Danish Football Association (in Danish), Soccerway
Rules for classification: 1) Points; 2) Goal difference; 3) Goals scored; 4) Away goals scored; 5) Play-off (played on neutral ground if determining teams for different rounds); 6) Draw.

==== Results by round - Regular season ====
Matchday	1	2	3	4	5	6	7	8	9	10	11	12	13	14	15	16	17	18	19	20	21	22
Ground	H	H	A	H	A	H	A	A	H	A	H	A	A	H	A	H	A	H	A	H	A	H
Result	D	D	W	W	W	W	W	W	L	W	D	D	L	W	D	D	W	W	W	W	W	W
Position	5	6	3	3	3	2	1	1	2	2	2	2	2	2	2	2	2	1	1	1	1	1

Source: http://www.superliga.dk/
A = Away; H = Home; W = Win; D = Draw; L = Loss

==== Championship round ====
Pos	Team	Pld	W	D	L	GF	GA	GD	Pts	Qualification	COP	MID	SIL	BRO	AAB	RAN
1	Copenhagen (C)	32	20	8	4	56	19	+37	68	Qualification for the Champions League play-off round	—	1–0	2–1	2–0	3–0	0–1
2	Midtjylland	32	20	5	7	59	33	+26	65	Qualification for the Champions League second qualifying round	0–0	—	3–2	2–2	2–0	3–2
3	Silkeborg	32	13	10	9	54	37	+17	49	Qualification for the Europa League play-off round	3–1	1–4	—	3–0	4–2	1–0
4	Brøndby	32	13	9	10	40	41	−1	48	Qualification for the Europa Conference League second qualifying round	1–1	1–3	2–1	—	0–1	0–1
5	AaB	32	13	6	13	47	45	+2	45	Qualification for the European play-off match	0–1	1–2	1–2	1–3	—	3–0

Source: Danish Football Association (in Danish), Soccerway
Legend: Blue = home team win; Yellow = draw; Red = away team win.
Rules for classification: 1) Points; 2) Goal difference; 3) Goals scored; 4) Away goals scored; 5) Play-off (played on neutral ground if determining teams for different rounds); 6) Draw.
(C) Champions

==== Results by round - Championship round ====
Matchday	1	2	3	4	5	6	7	8	9	10
Ground	A	H	A	H	H	A	A	H	A	H
Result	W	W	L	W	L	D	D	W	W	W
Position	1	1	1	1	1	1	1	1	1	1

Source: http://www.superliga.dk/
A = Away; H = Home; W = Win; D = Draw; L = Loss

==== Regular season ====
18 July 2021 1	Copenhagen	2–2	AaB	Copenhagen
16:00 CEST	Khocholava (yellow card) 19'; Wilczek 38' (Falk); Daramy 47' (Falk); Boilesen (red card) 73'	FCK Summary	Christensen (yellow card) 9'; Prip 37'; Kusk 69'	Stadium: Parken; Attendance: 13,326; Referee: Mads-Kristoffer Kristoffersen

25 July 2021 2	Copenhagen	0–0	Silkeborg	Copenhagen
16:00 CEST	Zeca (yellow card) 27'; Khocholava (yellow card) 62'; Lerager (yellow card) 72'	FCK Summary		Stadium: Parken; Attendance: 11,702; Referee: Peter Kjærsgaard-Andersen

1 August 2021 3	OB	0–2	Copenhagen	Odense
18:00 CEST		FCK Summary	Wind 12' (Diks); Diks 57' (Kristiansen); Nelsson (yellow card) 89'	Stadium: Nature Energy Park; Attendance: 12,493; Referee: Jakob Kehlet

8 August 2021 4	Copenhagen	4–2	Brøndby	Copenhagen
16:00 CEST	Wind 12' (Pep Biel) (yellow card) 64' (goal) 69' (Kristiansen); Khocholava 35'; Zeca (yellow card) 37'; Pep Biel 81' (yellow card) 88'	FCK Summary	Børkeeiet 26' (yellow card) 45+3'; Rosted 47' (Hedlund) (yellow card) 58'; Cappis (yellow card) 53'	Stadium: Parken; Attendance: 31,297; Referee: Mads-Kristoffer Kristoffersen

15 August 2021 5	AGF	1–3	Copenhagen	Aarhus
18:00 CEST	Mortensen 57' (pen.); Hausner (yellow card) 67'	FCK Summary	Daramy 21'; Pep Biel 45+3' (Diks) 59' (Kristiansen); Khocholava (yellow card) 50'; Boilesen (yellow card) 56'; Wind (yellow card) 85'; Stage (yellow card) 90+4'	Stadium: Ceres Park; Attendance: 13,113; Referee: Jakob A Sundberg

22 August 2021 6	Copenhagen	2–0	SønderjyskE	Copenhagen
16:00 CEST	Pep Biel 49'; Zeca (yellow card) 66'; Wind 72' (Daramy)	FCK Summary	Hassan (yellow card) 29'	Stadium: Parken; Attendance: 17,802; Referee: Peter Kjærsgaard-Andersen

29 August 2021 7	Vejle	0–4	Copenhagen	Vejle
18:00 CEST	Sousa (yellow card) 7'	FCK Summary	Lerager 18'; Pep Biel 24'; Zeca 54'; Kristiansen (yellow card) 66'; Stage 77'; Baldursson (yellow card) 87'	Stadium: Vejle Stadium; Attendance: 8,420; Referee: Jonas Hansen

12 September 2021 8	Randers	0–2	Copenhagen	Randers
TBD CEST	Lauridsen (yellow card) 81'	FCK Summary	Bøving 12' (Wind); Stage 46'; Lerager (yellow card) 74'	Stadium: Cepheus Park Randers; Attendance: 7,011; Referee: Sandi Putros

19 September 2021 9	Copenhagen	0–1	Midtjylland	Copenhagen
18:00 CEST	Boilesen (yellow card) 13'; Stage (yellow card) 61'; Khocholava (yellow card) 84'	FCK Summary	Evander (red card) 27'; Brumado 47'; Ólafsson (yellow card) 90+4'	Stadium: Parken; Attendance: 34,378; Referee: Jakob Kehlet

26 September 2021 10	Nordsjælland	1–5	Copenhagen	Farum
TBD CEST	Nagalo 52' (Frese)	FCK Summary	Stage 19' (Bøving); Lerager (yellow card) 39'; Thychosen 39' (o.g.); Diks 56' (Khocholava) (yellow card) 90+2'; Pep Biel 64' (Wind); Zeca (yellow card) 74'; Jóhannesson 80'	Stadium: Right to Dream Park; Attendance: 9,578; Referee: Mads-Kristoffer Kristoffersen

3 October 2021 11	Copenhagen	1–1	Viborg	Copenhagen
20:00 CEST	Diks (yellow card) 2'; Khocholava (yellow card) 61'; Stage 77' (Jóhannesson)	FCK Summary	Stage 90+5' (o.g.)	Stadium: Parken; Attendance: 15,197; Referee: Morten Krogh

17 October 2021 12	SønderjyskE	1–1	Copenhagen	Haderslev
18:00CEST	Simonsen 33' (Taiwo); Moumbagna (yellow card) 84'; Ekani (yellow card) 87'	FCK Summary	Jóhannesson (yellow card) 35'; Pep Biel 65'; Boilesen (yellow card) 88'	Stadium: Sydbank Park; Attendance: 8,257; Referee: Jørgen Daugbjerg Burchardt

24 October 2021 13	Brøndby	2–1	Copenhagen	Brøndbyvester
14:00 CEST	Frendrup 23' (Uhre); Bruus (yellow card) 36'; Heggheim (yellow card) 55'; Maxsø 57' (pen.); Hedlund (yellow card) 69'	FCK Summary	Lerager (yellow card) 26'; Grabara (yellow card) 56'; Wind 64' (Pep Biel); Khocholava (yellow card) 72'	Stadium: Brøndby Stadium; Attendance: 23,754; Referee: Peter Kjærsgaard-Andersen

31 October 2021 14	Copenhagen	3–0	Vejle	Copenhagen
16:00 CEST	Stage 16' (Bøving); Haraldsson 29' (Kristiansen); Ankersen (yellow card) 61'; Wind 63' (pen.); Pep Biel (yellow card) 87'	FCK Summary	Kolinger (yellow card) 27'; Hansson (yellow card) 37'; Engel (yellow card) 62'	Stadium: Parken; Attendance: 18,941; Referee: Aydin Uslu

7 November 2021 15	Silkeborg	0–0	Copenhagen	Silkeborg
20:00 CEST	Felix (yellow card) 67'	FCK Summary	Khocholava (yellow card) 47'	Stadium: JYSK Park; Attendance: 6,001; Referee: Mads-Kristoffer Kristoffersen

21 November 2021 16	Copenhagen	1–1	AGF	Copenhagen
16:00 CEST	Stage (yellow card) 6'; Wind (yellow card) 40'; Boilesen (yellow card) 41'; Lerager 45+1' (Stage); Falk (yellow card) 81'; Højlund (yellow card) 87'	FCK Summary	Lund (yellow card) 41'; Hausner (yellow card) 52'; Mortensen (yellow card) 79' (goal) 90+5' (pen.)	Stadium: Parken; Attendance: 25,814; Referee: Jørgen Daugbjerg Burchardt

28 November 2021 17	AaB	1–3	Copenhagen	Aalborg
18:00 CEST	Prip 16'; Ferreira (yellow card) 45+1'; Ross (yellow card) 49'; Pallesen (yellow card) 87'	FCK Summary	Lerager 15' (Ankersen) (yellow card) 30'; Pep Biel (yellow card) 18'; Bardghji 31' (Pep Biel); Bøving 41' (Ankersen); Khocholava (yellow card) 63'; Kristiansen (yellow card) 85'; Grabara (yellow card) 87'	Stadium: Aalborg Portland Park; Attendance: 10,254; Referee: Jakob Kehlet

20 February 2022 18	Copenhagen	2–0	OB	Copenhagen
18:00 CEST	Biel 32'; Lerager (yellow card) 33'; Ankersen (yellow card) 36'; Babacar 75' (Vavro)	FCK Summary		Stadium: Parken; Attendance: 26,255; Referee: Sandi Putros

27 February 2022 19	Viborg	0–2	Copenhagen	Viborg
16:00 CEST		FCK Summary	Vavro 30'; Jørgensen 90+2' (Pep Biel)	Stadium: Energi Viborg Arena; Attendance: 7,025; Referee: Jakob Kehlet

4 March 2022 20	Copenhagen	3–0	Randers	Copenhagen
20:00 CEST	Bardghji 19'; Vavro (yellow card) 21'; Mukairu (yellow card) 52'; Ankersen 69' (Pep Biel); Lerager 86' (Karamoko)	FCK Summary		Stadium: Parken; Attendance: 24,133; Referee: Morten Krogh

13 March 2022 21	Midtjylland	0–1	Copenhagen	Herning
18:00 CEST	Brumado (yellow card) 9'; Evander (yellow card) 42'; Dalsgaard (yellow card) 74'	FCK Summary	Lerager (yellow card) 71'; Babacar (yellow card) 86' (goal) 90+5'	Stadium: MCH Arena; Attendance: 11,288; Referee: Mads-Kristoffer Kristoffersen

20 March 2022 22	Copenhagen	1–0	Nordsjælland	Copenhagen
14:30 CEST	Amoo 7' (Babacar); Stage (yellow card) 31'; Diks (yellow card) 81'	FCK Summary		Stadium: Parken; Attendance: 27,692; Referee: Jakob Kehlet

==== Championship round ====
3 April 2022 23	AaB	0–1	Copenhagen	Aalborg
18:00 CET	Pallesen (yellow card) 26'; Fossum (yellow card) 77'; O. Ross (yellow card) 88'; M. Ross (yellow card) 90+4'	FCK Summary	Bardghji (yellow card) 31'; Diks (yellow card) 48'; Khocholava (yellow card) 58'; Claesson 81'	Stadium: Aalborg Portland Park; Attendance: 10,216; Referee: Michael Tykgaard

10 April 2022 24	Copenhagen	1–0	Midtjylland	Copenhagen
18:00 CET	Vavro (yellow card) 18'; Lerager 63' (Diks); Falk (yellow card) 83'	FCK Summary	Onyedika (yellow card) 46'; Ousted (yellow card) 71'; Paulinho (yellow card) 85'	Stadium: Parken; Attendance: 28,321; Referee: Jakob A. Sundberg

14 April 2022 25	Silkeborg	3–1	Copenhagen	Silkeborg
16:00 CET	Vallys 59' (Klynge); Helenius 74' (Jørgensen); Tengstedt 90+3' (Gojani)	FCK Summary	Vavro (yellow card) 84'; Haraldsson 89' (Babacar)	Stadium: JYSK Park; Attendance: 6,151; Referee: Anders Poulsen

17 April 2022 26	Copenhagen	2–0	Brøndby	Copenhagen
16:00 CET	Pep Biel 52' (Claesson) 86' (Mukairu); Falk (yellow card) 83'; Jørgensen (yellow card) 89'	FCK Summary	Divković (yellow card) 28'; Singh (yellow card) 82'; Rosted (yellow card) 89'	Stadium: Parken; Attendance: 33,758; Referee: Sandi Putros

24 April 2022 27	Copenhagen	0–1	Randers	Copenhagen
16:00 CET		FCK Summary	Ankersen 56' (Hammershøy-Mistrati); Bundgaard (yellow card) 73'	Stadium: Parken; Attendance: 21,243; Referee: Peter Kjærsgaard

1 May 2022 28	Midtjylland	0–0	Copenhagen	Herning
18:00 CET	Andersson (yellow card) 37'; Sviatchenko (yellow card) 76'; Onyedika (yellow card) 78'	FCK Summary	Ankersen (yellow card) 66'; Babacar (yellow card) 87'	Stadium: MCH Arena; Attendance: 11,289; Referee: Morten Krogh

8 May 2022 29	Brøndby	1–1	Copenhagen	Brøndbyvester
16:00 CET	Cappis (yellow card) 45+1'; Kvistgaarden (yellow card) 56'; Hedlund (yellow card) 76'; Salech (yellow card) 90+1'; Greve 90+2' (Riveros)	FCK Summary	Pep Biel 28'; Diks (yellow card) 61' (yellow-red card) 86'; Grabara (yellow card) 76'	Stadium: Brøndby Stadium; Attendance: 22,405; Referee: Michael Tykgaard

11 May 2022 30	Copenhagen	2–1	Silkeborg	Copenhagen
20:00 CET	Jóhannesson 2' (Claesson) 59' (Ankersen); Boilesen (yellow card) 90+6'	FCK Summary	Tengstedt 74'	Stadium: Parken; Attendance: 22,876; Referee: Jens Maae

15 May 2022 31	Randers	0–2	Copenhagen	Randers
16:00 CET	H. Andersson (yellow card) 34'; Carlgren (yellow card) 89'	FCK Summary	Jóhannesson (yellow card) 48'; Haraldsson 60' (Falk); Vavro (yellow card) 69'; Khocholava (yellow card) 74'; Babacar 90+2' (Bøving)	Stadium: Cepheus Park Randers; Attendance: 7,865; Referee: Sandi Putros

22 May 2022 32	Copenhagen	3–0	AaB	Copenhagen
17:00 CET	Haraldsson 8' (Claesson); Lerager 45+4' (Ankersen); Jóhannesson 53'	FCK Summary	O. Ross (yellow card) 66'; Hagelskjær (yellow card) 71'	Stadium: Parken; Attendance: 35,463; Referee: Mikkel Redder

=== Danish Cup ===
22 September 2021 Third round	Nykøbing FC	3–0	Copenhagen	Nykøbing Falster, Falster
18:00 CEST	Koch 14' (Gehrt) 19' (Jessen); Ljuti (yellow card) 48'; Christiansson (yellow card) 75'; Kristensen (yellow card) 81' (goal) 88' (Koch)	FCK Summary	Kristiansen (yellow card) 72'	Stadium: Lollands Bank Park; Attendance: 5,000; Referee: Jens Maae

=== UEFA Conference League ===
22 July 2021 Second qualifying round	Copenhagen (Denmark)	4–1	(Belarus) Torpedo Zhodino	Copenhagen, Denmark
19:00 CEST	Falk 43'; Wilczek 46' (Lerager) (yellow card) 55' (goal) 62' (Diks); Daramy (yellow card) 53'; Wind 65' (pen.)	FCK Summary	Astakhov (yellow card) 30'; Aussi (yellow card) 65'; Oya 90+2'	Stadium: Parken; Attendance: 8,636; Referee: Dumitri Muntean (Moldova)

29 July 2021 Second qualifying round	Torpedo Zhodino (Belarus)	0–5 (1–9 agg.)	(Denmark) Copenhagen	Kazan, Russia
19:00 CEST		FCK Summary	Diks 27'; Bøving 66' (Ankersen) 75'; Højlund 68' 90+3' (Bengtsson); Haraldsson (yellow card) 83'	Stadium: Tsentralnyi Stadion; Attendance: 0 Referee: Aleksandrs Anufrijevs (Latvia)

5 August 2021 Third qualifying round	Lokomotiv Plovdiv (Bulgaria)	1–1	(Denmark) Copenhagen	Plovdiv, Bulgaria
18:00 CEST	Minchev (yellow card) 17'; Umarbayev (yellow card) 51'; Iliev 60' (pen.); Crăciun (yellow card) 73'; Ruane (yellow card) 76'; Gomis (yellow card) 77'; Angelov (red card) 90+4'	FCK Summary	Pep Biel 74'; Diks (yellow card) 80'	Stadium: Stadion Lokomotiv; Attendance: 3,250; Referee: Nick Walsh (Scotland)

12 August 2021 Third qualifying round	Copenhagen (Denmark)	4–2 (5–3 agg.)	(Bulgaria) Lokomotiv Plovdiv	Copenhagen, Denmark
20:00 CEST	Diks 11' (Pep Biel) 20' (Daramy); Pep Biel 40' (Daramy); Daramy 48' (Lerager); Lerager (yellow card) 90+1'; Højlund (yellow card) 90+4'	FCK Summary	Iliev 30'; Gomis (yellow card) 65'; Umarbayev (yellow card) 66'; Salinas 85'	Stadium: Parken; Attendance: 12,633; Referee: Duje Strukan (Croatia)

19 August 2021 Play-off round	Sivasspor (Turkey)	1–2	(Denmark) Copenhagen	Sivas, Turkey
20:00 CEST	Osmanpaşa (yellow card) 46'; James 59'; Kayode (yellow card) 70'; Çiftçi (yellow card) 77'; Arslan (yellow card) 88'; Gradel (yellow card) 90+1'	FCK Summary	Daramy (yellow card) 22'; Khocholava (yellow card) 42'; Diks 55'; Stage 6' (Falk) (yellow card) 70'	Stadium: Yeni 4 Eylül; Attendance: 2,602; Referee: Mykola Balakin (Ukraine)

26 August 2021 Play-off round	Copenhagen (Denmark)	5–0 (7–1 agg.)	(Turkey) Sivasspor	Copenhagen, Denmark
19:00 CEST	Stage 2' (Pep Biel); Daramy 39'; Lerager 57' (Wind) (yellow card) 69'; Pep Biel 62' (Stage); Højlund 76'	FCK Summary	Altinay (yellow card) 24'; Erdal (yellow card) 30'; Oguz (yellow card) 90+4'	Stadium: Parken; Attendance: 18,214; Referee: Lawrence Visser (Belgium)

==== Group stage ====
Pos	Team	Pld	W	D	L	GF	GA	GD	Pts	Qualification
1	(Denmark) Copenhagen	6	5	0	1	15	5	+10	15	Advance to round of 16
2	(Greece) PAOK	6	3	2	1	8	4	+4	11	Advance to knockout round play-offs
3	(Slovakia) Slovan Bratislava	6	2	2	2	8	7	+1	8	
4	(Gibraltar) Lincoln Red Imps	6	0	0	6	2	17	−15	0	

Source: UEFA
Rules for classification: Group stage tiebreakers

16 September 2021 1	Slovan Bratislava (Slovakia)	1–3	(Denmark) Copenhagen	Bratislava, Slovakia
18:45 CEST	Čavrić (yellow card) 10'; Bozhikov (yellow card) 14'; Henty 21' (Green)	FCK Summary	Wind 18' (Pep Biel) 68' (pen.); Stage 41' (Pep Biel) (yellow card) 72'; Zeca (yellow card) 59'	Stadium: Národný futbalový štadión Attendance: 9,833; Referee: Michael Fabbri (Italy)

30 September 2021 2	Copenhagen (Denmark)	3–1	(Gibraltar) Lincoln Red Imps	Copenhagen, Denmark
21:00 CEST	Chipolina 4' (o.g.); Wind 45+2' (pen.); Stage 52'; Diks (yellow card) 64'	FCK Summary	Rosa 33'	Stadium: Parken; Attendance: 13,418; Referee: Kateryna Monzul (Ukraine)

21 October 2021 3	Copenhagen (Denmark)	1–2	(Greece) PAOK	Copenhagen, Denmark
18:45 CEST	Grabara (red card) 9'; Lerager (yellow card) 41'; Jóhannesson (yellow card) 52'; Pep Biel 80'; Wind (yellow card) 88'	FCK Summary	Sidcley 19' (Živković); Michailidis (yellow card) 22'; Živković 38' (Schwab) (yellow card) 82'; Paschalakis (yellow card) 69'; Świderski (yellow card) 81'	Stadium: Parken; Attendance: 19,552; Referee: Erik Lambrechts (Belgium)

4 November 2021 4	PAOK (Greece)	1–2	(Denmark) Copenhagen	Thessaloniki, Greece
21:00 CEST	Živković 7' (Świderski) (yellow card) 89'; Świderski (yellow card) 53'; Kurtić (yellow card) 73'; Michailidis (red card) 90+3'	FCK Summary	Ankersen 34' (Diks); Pep Biel 50' (Diks); Stage (yellow card) 77'; Kristiansen (yellow card) 89'; Johnsson (yellow card) 90+1'; Khocholava (yellow card) 90+4'	Stadium: Toumba Stadium; Attendance: 11,166; Referee: Paweł Raczkowski (Poland)

25 November 2021 5	Lincoln Red Imps (Gibraltar)	0–4	(Denmark) Copenhagen	Gibraltar
18:45 CEST	Rosa (yellow card) 41'; Torrilla (yellow card) 44'; Toscano (yellow card) 89'	FCK Summary	Jóhannesson 5'; Lerager 7' (Pep Biel); Bøving 63' (Jóhannesson); Højlund 73' (Jóhannesson)	Stadium: Victoria Stadium; Attendance: 1,008; Referee: Helgi Jónasson (Iceland)

9 December 2021 6	Copenhagen (Denmark)	2–0	(Slovakia) Slovan Bratislava	Copenhagen, Denmark
21:00 CEST	Wind 30' (Haraldsson); Højlund 53' (Haraldsson); Oikonomou (yellow card) 60'; Jelert (yellow card) 69'; Khocholava (yellow card) 78'	FCK Summary	Henty (yellow card) 60'; Agbo (yellow card) 71'; Bozhikov (yellow card) 81'	Stadium: Parken; Attendance: 13,201; Referee: Vad (Hungary)

==== Knockout phase ====
===== Round of 16 =====
The round of 16 draw was held on 25 February 2022.

10 March 2022 First Leg	PSV Eindhoven (Netherlands)	4–4	(Denmark) Copenhagen	Eindhoven, Netherlands
21:00CET (UTC+01:00)	Gakpo 21' (Madueke) 70'; Dōan 50'; Teze (yellow card) 75'; Zahavi 85' (Gakpo); Gutiérrez (yellow card) 90+3'	FCK Summary	Jóhannesson 6' (Bøving); Pep Biel 22' (Falk) 78'; Lerager 43' (Pep Biel); Kristiansen (yellow card) 49'; E. Højlund (yellow card) 87'	Stadium: PSV Stadion; Attendance: 26,000; Referee: Craig Pawson (England)

17 March 2022 Second Leg	Copenhagen (Denmark)	0–4 (4–8 agg.)	(Netherlands) PSV Eindhoven	Copenhagen
18:45 CET (UTC+01:00)	Diks (yellow card) 45'; Vavro (yellow card) 49'	FCK Summary	Zahavi 10' (Götze) 79' (Dōan); Götze (yellow card) 37' (goal) 38' (Max); Gutiérrez (yellow card) 50'; Madueke 90+1' (Bruma)	Stadium: Parken; Attendance: 30,337; Referee: Willie Collum (Scotland)

== Statistics ==
=== Appearances ===
As of 22 May - Season Complete

This includes all competitive matches and refers to all squad members playing throughout the season, regardless of their current roster status.

Rank	Pos	No.	Player	Superliga	Danish Cup	Europa Conference League	Total
1	MF	16	(Spain) Pep Biel	32	1	14	47
2	GK	1	(Poland) Kamil Grabara	33	0	12	45
3	MF	12	(Denmark) Lukas Lerager	29	1	13	43
4	DF	2	(Netherlands) Kevin Diks	26	1	12	39
4	DF	20	(Denmark) Nicolai Boilesen	26	1	12	39
4	DF	22	(Denmark) Peter Ankersen	28	1	10	39
7	MF	24	(Denmark) William Bøving	26	1	10	37
8	MF	6	(Denmark) Jens Stage	22	1	12	35
9	DF	5	(Georgia (country)) Davit Khocholava	22	0	12	34
10	MF	34	(Denmark) Victor Kristiansen	21	1	11	33
11	MF	33	(Denmark) Rasmus Falk	23	0	7	30
12	FW	23	(Denmark) Jonas Wind	16	1	11	28
13	FW	28	(Denmark) Rasmus Højlund	15	1	11	27
14	MF	8	(Iceland) Ísak Bergmann Jóhannesson	16	1	8	25
15	MF	10	(Greece) Zeca	11	0	7	18
16	DF	3	(Slovakia) Denis Vavro	13	0	2	15
16	MF	40	(Sweden) Roony Bardghji	13	0	2	15
16	MF	17	(Nigeria) Paul Mukairu	15	0	0	15
19	FW	9	(Poland) Kamil Wilczek	6	1	7	14
19	FW	11	(Senegal) Khouma Babacar	14	0	0	14
19	DF	38	(Denmark) Elias Jelert	11	0	3	14
19	MF	30	(Iceland) Hákon Arnar Haraldsson	10	0	4	14
23	FW	11	(Denmark) Mohamed Daramy	6	0	5	11
24	MF	15	(Sweden) Viktor Claesson	10	0	0	10
25	MF	26	(Greece) Marios Oikonomou	5	0	4	9
26	DF	3	(Sweden) Pierre Bengtsson	3	1	4	8
26	MF	28	(Iceland) Andri Baldursson	3	1	4	8
26	FW	9	(Denmark) Nicolai Jørgensen	8	0	0	8
29	MF	7	(South Africa) Luther Singh	4	0	3	7
29	DF	4	(Norway) Ruben Gabrielsen	4	1	2	7
31	DF	4	(Denmark) Victor Nelsson	2	0	2	4
31	GK	21	(Sweden) Karl-Johan Johnsson	0	1	3	4
33	MF	39	(Denmark) Daniel Haarbo	0	0	2	2
33	FW	45	(Denmark) Emil Højlund	0	0	2	2
33	MF	29	(Nigeria) Akinkunmi Amoo	2	0	0	2
33	FW	29	(France) Mamoudou Karamoko	2	0	0	2
33	MF	27	(Denmark) Valdemar Lund	3	0	0	3
38	FW	7	(Denmark) Viktor Fischer	0	0	1	1
38	DF	19	(Costa Rica) Bryan Oviedo	0	0	1	1
38	DF	37	(Denmark) Mattias Jakobsen	0	0	1	1
38	FW	46	(Denmark) Noah Sahsah	0	0	1	1
38	FW	42	(Iceland) Orri Óskarsson	1	0	0	1

=== Goalscorers ===
As of 22 May 2022 - Season Complete

This includes all competitive matches.

Rnk	Pos	No.	Player	Superliga	Danish Cup	Europa Conference League	Total
1	MF	16	(Spain) Pep Biel	11	0	7	18
2	FW	23	(Denmark) Jonas Wind	6	0	5	11
3	MF	6	(Denmark) Jens Stage	5	0	4	9
3	MF	12	(Denmark) Lukas Lerager	6	0	3	9
5	MF	8	(Iceland) Ísak Bergmann Jóhannesson	4	0	2	6
5	DF	2	(Netherlands) Kevin Diks	2	0	4	6
7	FW	24	(Denmark) William Bøving	2	0	3	5
7	FW	28	(Denmark) Rasmus Højlund	0	0	5	5
9	FW	11	(Denmark) Mohamed Daramy	2	0	2	4
9	MF	30	(Iceland) Hákon Arnar Haraldsson	4	0	0	4
11	FW	9	(Poland) Kamil Wilczek	1	0	2	3
11	FW	11	(Senegal) Khouma Babacar	3	0	0	3
13	DF	22	(Denmark) Peter Ankersen	1	0	1	2
13	MF	40	(Sweden) Roony Bardghji	2	0	0	2
13	MF	33	(Denmark) Rasmus Falk	0	0	1	1
13	DF	5	(Georgia (country)) Davit Khocholava	1	0	0	1
13	MF	10	(Greece) (Portugal) Zeca	1	0	0	1
13	DF	3	(Slovakia) Denis Vavro	1	0	0	1
13	FW	9	(Denmark) Nicolai Jørgensen	1	0	0	1
13	MF	23	(Nigeria) Akinkunmi Amoo	1	0	0	1
13	MF	15	(Sweden) Viktor Claesson	1	0	0	1
	O.G.		Opponent Own goal	1	0	1	2
TOTALS				56	0	40	96

=== Assists ===
As of 22 May 2022 - Season Complete

This includes all competitive matches.

Rnk	Pos	No.	Player	Superliga	Danish Cup	Europa Conference League	Total
1	MF	16	(Spain) Pep Biel	5	0	6	11
2	DF	2	(Netherlands) Kevin Diks	3	0	3	6
3	MF	33	(Denmark) Rasmus Falk	3	0	2	5
3	DF	22	(Denmark) Peter Ankersen	4	0	1	5
5	DF	34	(Denmark) Victor Kristiansen	4	0	0	4
5	FW	24	(Denmark) William Bøving	3	0	1	4
7	DF	11	(Denmark) Mohamed Daramy	1	0	2	3
7	FW	23	(Denmark) Jonas Wind	2	0	1	3
7	MF	8	(Iceland) Ísak Bergmann Jóhannesson	1	0	2	3
7	MF	15	(Sweden) Viktor Claesson	3	0	0	3
7	FW	11	(Senegal) Khouma Babacar	3	0	0	3
12	MF	12	(Denmark) Lukas Lerager	0	0	2	2
12	MF	6	(Denmark) Jens Stage	1	0	1	2
12	MF	30	(Iceland) Hákon Arnar Haraldsson	0	0	2	2
15	DF	3	(Sweden) Pierre Bengtsson	0	0	1	1
15	DF	5	(Georgia (country)) Davit Khocholava	1	0	0	1
15	DF	3	(Slovakia) Denis Vavro	1	0	0	1
15	FW	29	(France) Mamoudou Karamoko	1	0	0	1
15	MF	17	(Nigeria) Paul Mukairu	1	0	0	1
TOTALS				37	0	24	61

=== Clean sheets ===
As of 22 May 2022 - Season Complete

This includes all competitive matches.

Rnk	Pos	No.	Player	Superliga	Danish Cup	Europa Conference League	Total
1	GK	1	(Poland) Kamil Grabara	18	0	4	22
TOTALS				18	0	4	22

=== Disciplinary record ===
As of 22 May 2022 - Season Complete

This includes all competitive matches.

Rnk	Pos.	No.	Player	Superliga		Danish Cup		Europa Conference League		Total	
Rnk	Pos.	No.	Player	Yellow card	Red card	Yellow card	Red card	Yellow card	Red card	Yellow card	Red card
1	DF	5	(Georgia (country)) Davit Khocholava	10	0	0	0	3	0	13	0
2	MF	12	(Denmark) Lukas Lerager	7	0	0	0	3	0	10	0
2	DF	2	(Netherlands) Kevin Diks	5	1	0	0	4	0	9	1
4	MF	6	(Denmark) Jens Stage	4	0	0	0	2	0	6	0
4	DF	20	(Denmark) Nicolai Boilesen	5	1	0	0	0	0	5	1
6	MF	10	(Portugal) (Greece) Zeca	4	0	0	0	1	0	5	0
6	DF	34	(Denmark) Victor Kristiansen	2	0	1	0	2	0	5	0
6	DF	3	(Slovakia) Denis Vavro	4	0	0	0	1	0	5	0
9	FW	23	(Denmark) Jonas Wind	3	0	0	0	1	0	4	0
9	GK	1	(Poland) Kamil Grabara	3	0	0	0	0	1	3	1
11	MF	16	(Spain) Pep Biel	3	0	0	0	0	0	3	0
11	MF	33	(Denmark) Rasmus Falk	3	0	0	0	0	0	3	0
11	DF	22	(Denmark) Peter Ankersen	3	0	0	0	0	0	3	0
11	MF	8	(Iceland) Ísak Bergmann Jóhannesson	2	0	0	0	1	0	3	0
15	FW	11	(Denmark) Mohamed Daramy	0	0	0	0	2	0	2	0
15	FW	28	(Denmark) Rasmus Højlund	1	0	0	0	1	0	2	0
15	FW	26	(Greece) Marios Oikonomou	0	0	0	0	2	0	2	0
15	FW	11	(Senegal) Khouma Babacar	2	0	0	0	0	0	2	0
19	FW	9	(Poland) Kamil Wilczek	0	0	0	0	1	0	1	0
19	MF	30	(Iceland) Hákon Haraldsson	0	0	0	0	1	0	1	0
19	DF	4	(Denmark) Victor Nelsson	1	0	0	0	0	0	1	0
19	MF	18	(Iceland) Andri Baldursson	1	0	0	0	0	0	1	0
19	DF	38	(Denmark) Elias Jelert	0	0	0	0	1	0	1	0
19	MF	17	(Nigeria) Paul Mukairu	1	0	0	0	0	0	1	0
19	FW	45	(Denmark) Emil Højlund	0	0	0	0	1	0	1	0
19	MF	40	(Sweden) Roony Bardghji	1	0	0	0	0	0	1	0
19	FW	9	(Denmark) Nicolai Jørgensen	1	0	0	0	0	0	1	0
TOTALS				66	2	1	0	27	1	94	3
