= 2022–23 F.C. Copenhagen season =

F.C. Copenhagen
2022–23 season
- Chairman: Bo Rygaard
- Head coach: Jacob Neestrup
- Stadium: Parken Stadium
- Danish Superliga: 1st
- Danish Cup: Winners
- UEFA Champions League: Group stage
- Top goalscorer: League: Viktor Claesson (13); All: Viktor Claesson (17)
- Highest home attendance: 35,820 (4 Jun 2023 vs. Randers)
- Lowest home attendance: 22,010 (12 Aug 2022 vs. Randers)
- Average home league attendance: 28,862
- Biggest win: 7–0 (5 Mar 2023 vs. OB)
- Biggest defeat: 0–5 (5 Oct 2022 vs. Man. City)
| Home colours | Away colours | Third colours |

The 2022–23 F.C. Copenhagen season was the club's 31st season in existence, all of which have been competed in the top flight of Danish football. In addition to the domestic league, Copenhagen participated in this season's editions of the Danish Cup and, by virtue of earning the 2021–22 Danish Superliga Championship, competed in the UEFA Champions League. The season covers the period from 1 July 2022 to 30 June 2023.

== Players ==
=== First-team squad ===
As of 31 January 2023

| No. | Player | Nationality | Position | Since | Date of birth | Signed from |
Goalkeepers
| 1 | Kamil Grabara | (Poland) | GK | 2021 | 8 January 1999 | (England) Liverpool |
| 21 | Karl-Johan Johnsson | (Sweden) | GK | 2019 | 28 January 1990 | (France) Guingamp |
| 41 | Andreas Dithmer | (Denmark) | GK | 2022 | 1 August 2005 | (Denmark) Homegrown |
Defenders
| 2 | Kevin Diks | (Netherlands) | RB | 2021 | 6 October 1996 | (Italy) Fiorentina |
| 3 | Denis Vavro | (Slovakia) | CB | 2022 | 10 April 1996 | (Italy) Lazio |
| 5 | Davit Khocholava | (Georgia (country)) | CB | 2021 | 8 February 1993 | (Ukraine) Shakhtar |
| 6 | Christian Sørensen | (Denmark) | LB | 2022 | 6 August 1992 | (Denmark) Viborg |
| 19 | Elias Jelert | (Denmark) | RB | 2022 | 15 June 2003 | (Denmark) Homegrown |
| 20 | Nicolai Boilesen | (Denmark) | CB | 2016 | 16 February 1992 | (Netherlands) Ajax |
| 22 | Peter Ankersen | (Denmark) | RB | 2020 | 22 September 1990 | (Italy) Genoa |
| 27 | Valdemar Lund | (Denmark) | CB | 2021 | 28 May 2003 | (Denmark) Homegrown |
Midfielders
| 7 | Viktor Claesson (3rd captain) | (Sweden) | MF | 2022 | 2 January 1992 | (Russia) Krasnodar |
| 8 | Ísak Bergmann Jóhannesson | (Iceland) | MF | 2021 | 23 March 2003 | (Sweden) Norrköping |
| 9 | Diogo Gonçalves | (Portugal) | MF | 2023 | 6 February 1997 | (Portugal) Benfica |
| 10 | Zeca (captain) | (Greece) | MF | 2017 | 31 August 1988 | (Greece) Panathinaikos |
| 12 | Lukas Lerager | (Denmark) | MF | 2021 | 12 July 1993 | (Italy) Genoa |
| 17 | Paul Mukairu | (Nigeria) | MF | 2022 | 18 January 2000 | (Turkey) Antalyaspor |
| 23 | Akinkunmi Amoo | (Nigeria) | MF | 2022 | 7 June 2002 | (Sweden) Hammarby |
| 30 | Hákon Arnar Haraldsson | (Iceland) | MF | 2021 | 10 April 2003 | (Denmark) Homegrown |
| 33 | Rasmus Falk (vice-captain) | (Denmark) | MF | 2016 | 15 January 1992 | (Denmark) Odense |
| 35 | Marko Stamenić | (New Zealand) | MF | 2020 | 19 February 2002 | (New Zealand) Western Suburbs |
| 36 | William Clem | (Denmark) | MF | 2022 | 20 June 2004 | (Denmark) Homegrown |
| 40 | Roony Bardghji | (Sweden) | MF | 2021 | 15 November 2005 | (Denmark) Homegrown |
Forwards
| 11 | Khouma Babacar | (Senegal) | FW | 2022 | 17 March 1993 | (Italy) Sassuolo |
| 14 | Andreas Cornelius | (Denmark) | FW | 2022 | 16 March 1993 | (Turkey) Trabzonspor |
| 15 | Mohamed Daramy | (Denmark) (Sierra Leone) | FW | 2022 | 7 January 2002 | (Netherlands) Ajax |
| 25 | Jordan Larsson | (Sweden) | FW | 2023 | 20 June 1997 | (Germany) Schalke 04 |
| 29 | Mamoudou Karamoko | (France) | FW | 2022 | 8 September 1999 | (Austria) LASK |

=== Youth players in use ===
Note: Flags indicate national team as defined under FIFA eligibility rules; some limited exceptions apply. Players may hold more than one non-FIFA nationality.

| No. | Pos. | Nation | Player |
|---|---|---|---|
| 38 | DF | DEN | Aksel Halsgaard (from FC Copenhagen U19) |
| 39 | MF | DEN | Oscar Højlund (from FC Copenhagen U19) |
| 42 | FW | DEN | Thomas Jørgensen (from FC Copenhagen U19) |

| No. | Pos. | Nation | Player |
|---|---|---|---|
| 44 | FW | DEN | Emil Højlund (from FC Copenhagen U19) |
| 46 | FW | DEN | Noah Sahsah (from FC Copenhagen U19) |

=== Out on loan ===
Note: Flags indicate national team as defined under FIFA eligibility rules; some limited exceptions apply. Players may hold more than one non-FIFA nationality.

| No. | Pos. | Nation | Player |
|---|---|---|---|
| 18 | FW | ISL | Orri Óskarsson (at Sønderjyske until 30 June 2023) |
| 28 | MF | RSA | Luther Singh (at G.D. Chaves until 30 June 2023) |

| No. | Pos. | Nation | Player |
|---|---|---|---|
| — | MF | DEN | Daniel Haarbo (at FC Helsingør until 30 June 2023) |
| — | FW | DEN | Mikkel Kaufmann (at Karlsruher SC until 30 June 2023) |

== Non-competitive ==
=== Pre-season ===
| 27 June 2022 | Copenhagen | 0–2 | Silkeborg | Frederiksberg |
| 13:00 CEST | Vavro (yellow card) 78' | FCK Summary | Fuglsang 50'; Vallys 79' | Stadium: Nummer 10; Attendance: 200; Referee: Jonas Hansen |

| 2 July 2022 | Feyenoord (Netherlands) | 0–7 | Copenhagen | Rotterdam, Netherlands |
| 14:00 CEST | Kleijn (yellow card) 41' | FCK Summary | Kristiansen 5'; Khocholava 21'; Haraldsson 37' (yellow card) 50'; Diks 42'; Bardghji 45'; Bøving 53'; Jóhannesson 58' | Stadium: Feyenoord Academy; Attendance: 2,500 |

| 9 July 2022 | Club Brugge (Belgium) | 2–4 | Copenhagen | Doorwerth, Netherlands |
| 12:30 CEST | Vormer 22'; Jutglà 31' | FCK Summary | Pep Biel 70' (pen.) 76'; Bøving 109'; Bardghji 113' | Stadium: Sportpark De Waayenberg; Attendance: 50 |

=== Mid-season ===
| 15 January 2023 | Bayer Leverkusen (Germany) | 1–0 | Copenhagen | Leverkusen, Germany |
| 13:00 CET | Palacios (yellow card) 26'; Adli 69' | FCK Summary | Diks (yellow card) 55' | Stadium: BayArena; Attendance: 8,096; Referee: Martin Thomsen |

| 26 January 2023 | Copenhagen | 4–1 | Hvidovre | Frederiksberg |
| 14:30 CET | Stamenić (yellow card) 27'; Khocholava (yellow card) 40'; Haraldsson 58' 62'; Lerager 69'; Gonçalves 83' (pen.) | FCK Summary | Thomsen 24' | Stadium: Nummer 10; Attendance: 250; Referee: Alexander Dreyer |

| 30 January 2023 | Copenhagen | 0–0 | AGF | Frederiksberg |
| 13:30 CET | Claesson (yellow card) 53'; Lund (yellow card) 72' | FCK Summary | Duin (yellow card) 85' | Stadium: Nummer 10; Referee: Jakob A. Sundberg |

| 14 February 2023 | Copenhagen | 2–0 | Næstved | Frederiksberg |
| 14:00 CET | Bardghji 30'; Jóhannesson 61' | FCK Summary | | Stadium: Nummer 10; Referee: Jonas Hansen |

| 23 March 2023 | Copenhagen | 1–1 | (Norway) SK Brann | Frederiksberg |
| 15:30 CET | Karamoko 28' (pen.) | FCK Summary | Heggebø 40' (pen.) | Stadium: Nummer 10; Attendance: 0 Referee: Frida Mia Klarlund |

=== Atlantic Cup ===
| 4 February 2023 | Elfsborg (Sweden) | 1–4 | Copenhagen | Algarve, Portugal |
| 17:00 GMT | Okkels 52' | FCK Report | Cornelius 41' (Sørensen); Gonçalves 61' 73' (pen.); Haraldsson 79' (Diks) | Stadium: Estadio Algarve; Attendance: 250; Referee: Pedro Ramalho (Portugal) |

| 7 February 2023 | Viking (Norway) | 0–0 (6–5 p) | Copenhagen | Portimão, Portugal |
| 19:00 GMT | | FCK Report | Johnsson (yellow card) 78' | Stadium: Estadio Municipal Bela Vista; Attendance: 50; Referee: João Afonso (Portugal) |
| | Penalties |
| | (penalty scored) Sandberg; (penalty scored) Kabran; (penalty missed) Brekalo; (penalty scored) Kvia-Egeskog; (penalty scored) Pattynama; (penalty scored) Solbakken; (penalty scored) Østbø | | Vavro (penalty missed); Larsson (penalty scored); Jóhannesson (penalty scored); Lerager (penalty scored); Jelert (penalty scored); Lund (penalty scored); Sahsah (penalty missed) |

| 10 February 2023 | AIK (Sweden) | 1–2 | Copenhagen | Algarve, Portugal |
| 19:00 GMT | Faraj 90+1' (pen.) | FCK Report | Haraldsson 50'; Vavro 73' | Stadium: Estadio Algarve; Attendance: 50; Referee: Flavio Lima (Portugal) |

== Competitions ==
=== Competition record ===
| Competition | Record | | | | | | | |
| Competition | G | W | D | L | GF | GA | GD | Win % |
|---|---|---|---|---|---|---|---|---|
| Superliga | 32 | 18 | 5 | 9 | 61 | 35 | +26 | 56.25 |
| Danish Cup | 7 | 4 | 2 | 1 | 14 | 8 | +6 | 57.14 |
| Champions League | 8 | 1 | 4 | 3 | 3 | 13 | −10 | 12.50 |
| Total | 47 | 23 | 11 | 13 | 78 | 56 | +22 | 48.94 |

Source: Competitive matches

=== Superliga ===
==== League table ====
| Pos | Team | Pld | W | D | L | GF | GA | GD | Pts | Qualification |
|---|---|---|---|---|---|---|---|---|---|---|
| 1 | Nordsjælland | 22 | 12 | 7 | 3 | 38 | 20 | +18 | 43 | Qualification for the Championship round |
| 2 | Copenhagen | 22 | 13 | 3 | 6 | 45 | 22 | +23 | 42 | Qualification for the Championship round |
| 3 | Viborg | 22 | 10 | 7 | 5 | 32 | 25 | +7 | 37 | Qualification for the Championship round |
| 4 | AGF | 22 | 10 | 5 | 7 | 26 | 20 | +6 | 35 | Qualification for the Championship round |
| 5 | Randers | 22 | 8 | 8 | 6 | 28 | 30 | −2 | 32 | Qualification for the Championship round |

Source: Danish Football Association (in Danish), Soccerway
Rules for classification: 1) Points; 2) Goal difference; 3) Goals scored; 4) Away goals scored; 5) Play-off (played on neutral ground if determining teams for different rounds); 6) Draw.

==== Results by round - Regular season ====
| Matchday | 1 | 2 | 3 | 4 | 5 | 6 | 7 | 8 | 9 | 10 | 11 | 12 | 13 | 14 | 15 | 16 | 17 | 18 | 19 | 20 | 21 | 22 |
|---|---|---|---|---|---|---|---|---|---|---|---|---|---|---|---|---|---|---|---|---|---|---|
| Ground | H | A | A | H | H | A | A | H | A | A | H | H | A | H | A | H | A | A | H | H | A | H |
| Result | L | W | L | W | L | W | L | W | L | L | W | D | D | D | W | W | W | W | W | W | W | W |
| Position | 11 | 5 | 8 | 5 | 8 | 5 | 8 | 6 | 6 | 9 | 6 | 7 | 7 | 8 | 6 | 3 | 3 | 3 | 3 | 2 | 2 | 2 |

Source: http://www.superliga.dk/
A = Away; H = Home; W = Win; D = Draw; L = Loss

==== Championship round ====
| Pos | Team | Pld | W | D | L | GF | GA | GD | Pts | Qualification | COP | NOR | AGF | VIB | BRO | RAN |
|---|---|---|---|---|---|---|---|---|---|---|---|---|---|---|---|---|
| 1 | Copenhagen (C) | 32 | 18 | 5 | 9 | 61 | 35 | +26 | 59 | Qualification for the Champions League second qualifying round | — | 2–1 | 4–3 | 2–1 | 0–1 | 1–1 |
| 2 | Nordsjælland | 32 | 15 | 10 | 7 | 50 | 35 | +15 | 55 | Qualification for the Europa Conference League third qualifying round | 3–2 | — | 0–1 | 0–0 | 2–1 | 3–1 |
| 3 | AGF | 32 | 14 | 9 | 9 | 42 | 31 | +11 | 51 | Qualification for the Europa Conference League second qualifying round | 0–0 | 1–1 | — | 3–0 | 3–3 | 1–1 |
| 4 | Viborg | 32 | 14 | 9 | 9 | 44 | 35 | +9 | 51 | Qualification for the European play-off match | 1–2 | 1–0 | 0–1 | — | 1–1 | 3–1 |
| 5 | Brøndby | 32 | 12 | 8 | 12 | 48 | 52 | −4 | 44 | | 1–3 | 5–1 | 1–0 | 0–3 | — | 0–4 |

Source: Danish Football Association (in Danish), Soccerway
Legend: Blue = home team win; Yellow = draw; Red = away team win.
Rules for classification: 1) Points; 2) Goal difference; 3) Goals scored; 4) Away goals scored; 5) Play-off (played on neutral ground if determining teams for different rounds); 6) Draw.
(C) Champions

==== Results by round - Championship round ====
| Matchday | 1 | 2 | 3 | 4 | 5 | 6 | 7 | 8 | 9 | 10 |
|---|---|---|---|---|---|---|---|---|---|---|
| Ground | H | A | H | A | H | A | A | H | A | H |
| Result | W | L | W | D | L | L | W | W | W | D |
| Position | 1 | 2 | 1 | 1 | 1 | 2 | 1 | 1 | 1 | 1 |

Source: http://www.superliga.dk/
A = Away; H = Home; W = Win; D = Draw; L = Loss

==== Regular season ====
| 17 July 2022 1 | Copenhagen | 0–1 | Horsens | Copenhagen |
| 16:00 CEST | Stamenić (yellow card) 58' | FCK Summary | Jensen (yellow card) 16'; Kiilerich (yellow card) 50'; Musonda 61' (Jacobsen) (yellow card) 85' | Stadium: Parken; Attendance: 22,184; Referee: Jakob Kehlet |

| 24 July 2022 2 | AaB | 1–3 | Copenhagen | Aalborg |
| 18:00 CEST | Sousa (yellow card) 54' (goal) 79' (Prip); Pallesen (yellow card) 75' | FCK Summary | Haraldsson (yellow card) 20'; Claesson 45+6' 71' (Haraldsson); Jóhannesson (yellow card) 87' (goal) 90+4' (Claesson); Kristiansen (yellow card) 90+4' | Stadium: Aalborg Portland Park; Attendance: 9,395; Referee: Morten Krogh |

| 31 July 2022 3 | Viborg | 4–2 | Copenhagen | Viborg |
| 16:00 CEST | Leemans 27' 33' (Lonwijk); Said (yellow card) 40'; Lonwijk; Zaletel (yellow card) 89'; Sørensen 90+3' (Žambůrek) | FCK Summary | Claesson 7' (Biel); Vavro (yellow card) 45+1'; Pep Biel 62' (Diks); Jelert (yellow card) 82' | Stadium: Viborg Stadium; Attendance: 6,064; Referee: Jonas Hansen |

| 7 August 2022 4 | Copenhagen | 4–1 | Brøndby | Copenhagen |
| 16:00 CEST | Falk 13'; Pep Biel 33' 45' (Vavro) 64'; Lerager (yellow card) 43'; Zeca (yellow card) 90+5' | FCK Summary | Cappis 19' (Divković); Tshiembe (yellow card) 43'; Heggheim (yellow card) 76'; Kvistgaarden (yellow card) 87' | Stadium: Parken; Attendance: 32,630; Referee: Jakob A. Sundberg |

| 12 August 2022 5 | Copenhagen | 1–3 | Randers | Copenhagen |
| 21:00 CEST | Lund 37' (Pep Biel); Kristiansen (yellow card) 50'; Claesson (yellow card) 55' | FCK Summary | Egho (yellow card) 44' (goal) 58' (Ankersen); Johnsen (yellow card) 46'; Lauenborg 60' (A. Andersson) (yellow card) 65'; H. Andersson 70' (A. Andersson); Carlgren (yellow card) 90+3' | Stadium: Parken; Attendance: 22,010; Referee: Sandi Putros |

| 19 August 2022 6 | Lyngby | 0–3 | Copenhagen | Lyngby |
| 19:00 CEST | Bjelland (yellow card) 47'; Westergaard (yellow card) 79'; Jørgensen (yellow card) 90+4' | FCK Summary | Claesson 15' (Pep Biel) 52'; Lund (yellow card) 42'; Pep Biel 49' (pen.); Haraldsson (yellow card) 57' | Stadium: Lyngby Stadion; Attendance: 10,036; Referee: Morten Krogh |

| 28 August 2022 7 | Nordsjælland | 3–1 | Copenhagen | Farum |
| 16:00 CEST | Schjelderup 11' (Nuamah) (yellow card) 14'; Diomande 25'; Frese (yellow card) 45'; Nuamah (yellow card) 62'; Antman 90+1' (Coulibaly) | FCK Summary | Khocholava (yellow card) 37'; Haraldsson (yellow card) 70'; Vavro (yellow card) 75'; Pep Biel 90+9' (pen.) | Stadium: Right to Dream Park; Attendance: 9,497; Referee: Jørgen Daugbjerg Burchardt |

| 2 September 2022 8 | Copenhagen | 1–0 | Silkeborg | Copenhagen |
| 19:00 CEST | Claesson 41' (Kristiansen); Daramy (yellow card) 48'; Diks (yellow card) 84'; Cornelius (yellow card) 90+3' | FCK Summary | Salquist (yellow card) 48'; Þórðarson (yellow card) 90+3' | Stadium: Parken Stadium; Attendance: 24,896; Referee: Jens Maae |

| 10 September 2022 9 | OB | 2–1 | Copenhagen | Odense |
| 19:00 CEST | Ivančević (yellow card) 24'; Jebali 45' (Kadrii); Minteh 86'; Kadrii (yellow card) 90'; Grubbe (yellow card) 90+1' | FCK Summary | Frøkjær-Jensen 22' (o.g.); Falk (yellow card) 45+2'; Claesson (yellow card) 90'; Boilesen (yellow card) 90+4' | Stadium: Nature Energy Park; Attendance: 12,056; Referee: Jakob Kehlet |

| 18 September 2022 10 | Midtjylland | 2–1 | Copenhagen | Herning |
| 18:00 CEST | Evander 36' (pen.); Dreyer 36' (Kaba) (yellow card) 65'; Andersson (yellow card) 52'; Sviatchenko (yellow card) 72' | FCK Summary | Daramy 25' (Jóhannesson); Khocholava (yellow card) 59'; Claesson (yellow card) 88'; Kristiansen (yellow card) 90+2' | Stadium: MCH Arena; Attendance: 10,911; Referee: Mads-Kristoffer Kristoffersen |

| 2 October 2022 11 | Copenhagen | 1–0 | AGF | Copenhagen |
| 18:00 CEST | Diks (yellow card) 43'; Lerager 81' (Haraldsson) | FCK Summary | Kristensen (yellow card) 20'; Bisseck (yellow card) 41'; Tingager (yellow card) 60'; Grønning (yellow card) 90+5' | Stadium: Parken Stadium; Attendance: 26,364; Referee: Jakob A. Sundberg |

| 8 October 2022 12 | Copenhagen | 1–1 | Nordsjælland | Copenhagen |
| 19:00 CEST | Haraldsson (yellow card) 41'; Jelert (yellow card) 65'; Bardghji 83'; Khocholava (yellow card) 90+2'; Diks (yellow card) 90+4' | FCK Summary | Christensen (yellow card) 18'; Antman; Frese (yellow card) 90+3'; Hansen (yellow card) 90+6' | Stadium: Parken Stadium; Attendance: 28,442; Referee: Peter Kjærsggard-Andersen |

| 16 October 2022 13 | Brøndby | 1–1 | Copenhagen | Brøndbyvester |
| 14:00 CEST | Omoijuanfo 10' (Wass); Hedlund (yellow card) 39'; Rosted (yellow card) 41' (yellow-red card) 90+5'; Slimane (yellow card) 85' | FCK Summary | Jóhannesson (yellow card) 15'; Kristiansen (yellow card) 40'; Lerager (yellow card) 41'; Bardghji 90+8' (Claesson) | Stadium: Brøndby Stadium; Attendance: 23,245; Referee: Morten Krogh |

| 22 October 2022 14 | Copenhagen | 1–1 | Midtjylland | Copenhagen |
| 16:00 CEST | Stamenić (yellow card) 25'; Claesson 31' (Jelert); Daramy (yellow card) 52'; Lerager (yellow card) 57'; Khocholava (yellow card) 71'; Jóhannesson (yellow card) 90+1' | FCK Summary | Olsson (yellow card) 59'; Kaba (yellow card) 48'; Evander 72'; Thychosen (yellow card) 78'; Sviatchenko (yellow card) 84'; Paulinho (yellow card) 90+1' | Stadium: Parken Stadium; Attendance: 29,664; Referee: Mads-Kristoffer Kristoffersen |

| 29 October 2022 15 | Randers | 0–2 | Copenhagen | Randers |
| 16:00 CEST | Lauenborg (yellow card) 74' | FCK Summary | Stamenić (yellow card) 28'; Lerager 51' (Daramy); Kristiansen (yellow card) 70'; Daramy 72' (Lerager); Lund (yellow card) 81]'; Grabara (yellow card) 87' | Stadium: Cepheus Park Randers; Attendance: 6,220; Referee: Jakob A. Sundberg |

| 6 November 2022 16 | Copenhagen | 3–0 | Lyngby | Copenhagen |
| 16:00 CET | Clem (yellow card) 18'; Bardghji 24' (Daramy); Khocholava (yellow card) 67'; Haraldsson 73'; Claesson 77' | FCK Summary | Winther (yellow card) 45'; Rømer (yellow card) 70'; Letschert (yellow card) 85' | Stadium: Parken Stadium; Attendance: 26,043; Referee: Sandi Putros |

| 13 November 2022 17 | AGF | 0–3 | Copenhagen | Aarhus |
| 14:00 CET | | FCK Summary | Kristiansen (yellow card) 3' (goal) 90+3'; Clem (yellow card) 41'; Jelert (yellow card) 49'; Lerager 79' (Bardghji) | Stadium: Ceres Park; Attendance: 18,126; Referee: Mads-Kristoffer Kristoffersen |

| 19 February 2023 18 | Silkeborg | 0–3 | Copenhagen | Silkeborg |
| 16:00 CET | | FCK Summary | Sørensen 14'; Daramy 51' (Claesson); Lerager 53' | Stadium: JYSK Park; Attendance: 7,343; Referee: Mads-Kristoffer Kristoffersen |

| 26 February 2023 19 | Copenhagen | 1–0 | AaB | Copenhagen |
| 16:00 CET | Claesson 62' (Jelert) | FCK Summary | Kramer (yellow card) 64'; Thelander (yellow card) 70'; Jørgensen (yellow card) 75'; Bakiz (yellow card) 87'; Ementa (yellow card) 90+1' | Stadium: Parken; Attendance: 31,663; Referee: Jakob Kehlet |

| 5 March 2023 20 | Copenhagen | 7–0 | OB | Copenhagen |
| 18:30 CET | Gonçalves 29' (pen.); Lerager 43' 83' (Daramy); Daramy 47' 87' (Diks); Falk 52'; Haraldsson 55' | FCK Summary | Adelgaard (red card) 28'; Sabbi (yellow card) 37'; Ivančević (yellow card) 44' (yellow-red card) 61' | Stadium: Parken; Attendance: 24,706; Referee: Morten Krogh |

| 12 March 2023 21 | Horsens | 1–4 | Copenhagen | Horsens |
| 16:00 CET | Jacobsen 2' | FCK Summary | Vavro 48' (Daramy) (yellow card) 78'; Haraldsson 52'; Larsson 54' (Haraldsson); Jelert 90+4' (Cornelius) | Stadium: CASA Horsens Arena; Attendance: 5,973; Referee: Jens Maae |

| 19 March 2023 22 | Copenhagen | 2–1 | Viborg | Copenhagen |
| 15:00 CET | Haraldsson 13'; Vavro (yellow card) 36'; Claesson (yellow card) 55'; Jelert (yellow card) 64'; Daramy 66' (Diks); Diks (yellow card) 90+4' | FCK Summary | Leemans (yellow card) 36'; Mortimer 70' (Achouri); Achouri (yellow card) 79'; Bonde (yellow card) 80' | Stadium: Parken; Attendance: 32,678; Referee: Mikkel Redder |

==== Championship round ====
| 2 April 2023 23 | Copenhagen | 2–1 | Nordsjælland | Copenhagen |
| 18:00 CET | Haraldsson (yellow card) 34'; Khocholava (yellow card) 39'; Lerager (yellow card) 52'; Daramy 62' (Claesson); Claesson 82'; Sørensen (yellow card) 89' | FCK Summary | Bidstrup (yellow card) 25'; Diomande 38' (Hansen) (yellow card) 52'; Frese (yellow card) 64' | Stadium: Parken; Attendance: 30,671; Referee: Jakob Kehlet |

| 10 April 2023 24 | Randers | 1–0 | Copenhagen | Randers |
| 16:00 CET | Klysner (yellow card) 49'; Odey (yellow card) 82'; Ankersen 84' | FCK Summary | | Stadium: Cepheus Park Randers; Attendance: 7,324; Referee: Peter Kjærsgaard-Andersen |

| 16 April 2023 25 | Copenhagen | 2–1 | Viborg | Copenhagen |
| 16:00 CET | Daramy 10' (Clem); Haraldsson (yellow card) 27'; Ankersen (yellow card) 47'; Claesson 75' (Falk) | FCK Summary | Bonde (yellow card) 26'; Achouri 42' (yellow card) 86' | Stadium: Parken; Attendance: 26,947; Referee: Mads-Kristoffer Kristoffersen |

| 23 April 2023 26 | AGF | 0–0 | Copenhagen | Aarhus |
| 18:00 CET | Beijmo (yellow card) 43' | FCK Summary | Gonçalves (yellow card) 39' | Stadium: Ceres Park; Attendance: 18,082; Referee: Mikkel Redder |

| 30 April 2023 27 | Copenhagen | 0–1 | Brøndby | Copenhagen |
| 16:00 CET | Lund (yellow card) 35'; Diks (yellow card) 86'; Jelert (yellow card) 90+3' | FCK Summary | Mensah (yellow card) 29'; Vallys (yellow card) 43'; Omoijuanfo 79' (Vallys); Ben Slimane (yellow card) 85'; Hedlund (yellow card) 90+3'; Kvistgaarden (yellow card) 90+3' | Stadium: Parken; Attendance: 35,057; Referee: Sandi Putros |

| 8 May 2023 28 | Nordsjælland | 3–2 | Copenhagen | Farum |
| 19:00 CET | Frese 28' (Diomande); Svensson 59' (yellow card) 90+7'; Nuamah 88' (Faghir) | FCK Summary | Haraldsson (yellow card) 12'; Vavro (yellow card) 57'; Hansen 71' (o.g.); Diks (yellow card) 86' (yellow-red card) 90+4'; Gonçalves 90+8' (pen.) | Stadium: Right to Dream Park; Attendance: 9,713; Referee: Peter Kjærsgaard |

| 14 May 2023 29 | Brøndby | 1–3 | Copenhagen | Brøndbyvester |
| 16:00 CET | Winther (yellow card) 25'; Omoijuanfo 56' (pen.); Wass (red card) 82'; Tshiembe (yellow card) 83' | FCK Summary | Claesson (yellow card) 4' (goal) 18' (Jelert); Lund (yellow card) 17'; Ankersen (yellow card) 55'; Larsson 73' (Sørensen); Haraldsson (yellow card) 82'; Stamenić (yellow card) 83'; Sørensen 84' (Jelert) | Stadium: Brøndby Stadium; Attendance: 24,478; Referee: Mikkel Redder |

| 21 May 2023 30 | Copenhagen | 4–3 | AGF | Copenhagen |
| 18:00 CET | Gonçalves 9' (pen.) 18' (Jelert); Jelert (yellow card) 35'; Sørensen (yellow card) 50'; Larsson 76' (Diks); Lund (yellow card) 84'; Diks 87' (Jóhannesson) | FCK Summary | Bisseck (yellow card) 8'; Mortensen 29' (Beijmo); Anderson 39' (Beijmo); Mølgaard (yellow card) 49'; Yakob 53' (Tingager); Haugen (yellow card) 90+7' | Stadium: Parken; Attendance: 32,013; Referee: Mads-Kristoffer Kristoffersen |

| 29 May 2023 31 | Viborg | 1–2 | Copenhagen | Viborg |
| 16:00 CET | Said (yellow card) 7' (yellow-red card) 83'; Grønning (yellow card) 49'; Bonde 62' (pen.); Bundgaard (yellow card) 68' | FCK Summary | Larsson 15' (yellow card) 90+12'; Gonçalves 33'; Claesson (yellow card) 60'; Jóhannesson (yellow card) 90+7'; Grabara (yellow card) 90+8' | Stadium: Viborg Stadium; Attendance: 9,523; Referee: Morten Krogh |

| 4 June 2023 32 | Copenhagen | 1–1 | Randers | Copenhagen |
| 18:00 CET | Clem (yellow card) 33'; Bardghji (yellow card) 62'; Claesson 83' (Haraldsson) | FCK Summary | Odey 45+5' (Kopplin); Andersson (yellow card) 87' | Stadium: Parken; Attendance: 35,820; Referee: Jonas Hansen |

=== Danish Cup ===
| 19 October 2022 Third round | Hobro | 1–1 (a.e.t.) (3–5 p) | Copenhagen | Hobro |
| 18:00 CEST | Freundlich 4'; Yoda (yellow card) 86' | FCK Report | Khocholava 66' (Sørensen); Lerager (yellow card) 68'; Haraldsson (yellow card) 70' (yellow-red card) 81'; Clem (yellow card) 97'; Diks (yellow card) 111' | Stadium: DS Arena; Attendance: 3,054; Referee: Jens Maae |
| | Penalties |
| | Søgaard (penalty scored); Elkær (penalty scored); Skjellerup (penalty scored); Deedson (penalty missed) | | (penalty scored) Claesson; (penalty scored) Daramy; (penalty scored) Kristiansen; (penalty scored) Sørensen; (penalty scored) Diks |

| 9 November 2022 Fourth round | Thisted | 1–3 (a.e.t.) | Copenhagen | Thisted |
| 18:00 CET | Hansen 38' | FCK Summary | Óskarsson 21' (Sørensen); Vavro (yellow card) 45+1'; Cornelius 99' (Sørensen) 103' (Sørensen) | Stadium: Sparekassen Thy Arena; Attendance: 3,742; Referee: Jakob Kehlet |

| 1 March 2023 Quarter-finals first leg | Copenhagen | 2–0 | Vejle | Copenhagen |
| 20:00 CET | Khocholava (yellow card) 55'; Vavro (yellow card) 67'; Daramy 68' (Vavro) (yellow card) 90+10'; Ankersen (yellow card) 90+7'; Claesson 90+8' (Haraldsson) | FCK Summary | Drammeh (yellow card) 35'; Albentosa (yellow card) 45+2'; Provstgaard (yellow card) 67' | Stadium: Parken; Attendance: 17,433; Referee: Peter Kjærsgaard |

| 6 April 2023 Quarter-finals second leg | Vejle | 0–0 (2–0 agg.) | Copenhagen | Vejle |
| 19:30 CET | Albentosa (yellow card) 43'; Elvius (yellow card) 56'; Ezatolahi (yellow card) 90+5' | FCK Summary | | Stadium: Vejle Stadium; Attendance: 10,021; Referee: Mikkel Redder |

| 26 April 2023 Semi-finals first leg | Nordsjælland | 3–2 | Copenhagen | Farum |
| 18:00 | Hansen 7' (Ascone); Bidstrup (yellow card) 52'; Nagalo 75' (Hansen); Marcondes 90+1' (pen.) | FCK Summary | Jóhannesson (yellow card) 38'; Gonçalves 65'; Larsson 71' (Gonçalves) | Stadium: Right to Dream Park; Attendance: 6,440; Referee: Jens Maae |

| 3 May 2023 Semi-finals second leg | Copenhagen | 5–3 (7–6 agg.) | Nordsjælland | Copenhagen |
| 19:30 CET | Claesson 7' (Daramy) 16'; Lund (yellow card) 11'; Larsson 21' (Claesson); Vavro 62' (Sørensen); Sørensen (yellow card) 69'; Gonçalves 78' (pen.); Haraldsson (yellow card) 90+3' | FCK Summary | Nuamah 13' (pen.); Nagalo (yellow card) 43'; Christensen (yellow card) 52' (goal) 66' (Nygren); Faghir 71' (Christensen) | Stadium: Parken; Attendance: 25,255; Referee: Jakob Kehlet |

| 18 May 2023 Final | AaB | 0–1 | Copenhagen | Copenhagen |
| 14:00 CET | Jørgensen (yellow card) 49'; Thelander (yellow card) 79'; Ementa (yellow card) 90+3' | FCK Summary | Gonçalves 48'; Jelert (yellow card) 82'; Haraldsson (yellow card) 86'; Grabara (yellow card) 90+3'; Claesson (yellow card) 90+6' | Stadium: Parken; Attendance: 34,937; Referee: Jakob A. Sundberg |

=== UEFA Champions League ===
==== Play-off round ====
The draw for the play-off round was held on 2 August 2022.

| 16 August 2022 First leg | Copenhagen (Denmark) | 2–1 | (Turkey) Trabzonspor | Copenhagen |
| 21:00 CET (UTC+01:00) | Claesson 9' (Falk); Lerager (yellow card) 35', (goal) 48' (Vavro); Vavro (yellow card) 85' | FCK Report | Kouassi (yellow card) 43'; Bakasetas 79' (Ömür) (yellow card) 84'; Djaniny (yellow card) 85' | Stadium: Parken Stadium; Attendance: 27,520; Referee: Michael Oliver (England) |

| 24 August 2022 Second leg | Trabzonspor (Turkey) | 0–0 (1–2 agg.) | (Denmark) Copenhagen | Trabzon, Turkey |
| 21:00 CET (UTC+01:00) | Bartra (yellow card) 90+3' | FCK Report | Kristiansen (yellow card) 23'; Claesson (yellow card) 48'; Ryan (yellow card) 68' | Stadium: Medical Park Stadymu; Attendance: 36,128; Referee: Danny Makkelie (Netherlands) |

==== Group stage ====
| Pos | Team | Pld | W | D | L | GF | GA | GD | Pts | Qualification |
|---|---|---|---|---|---|---|---|---|---|---|
| 1 | (England) Manchester City | 6 | 4 | 2 | 0 | 14 | 2 | +12 | 14 | Advance to knockout phase |
| 2 | (Germany) Borussia Dortmund | 6 | 2 | 3 | 1 | 10 | 5 | +5 | 9 | Advance to knockout phase |
| 3 | (Spain) Sevilla | 6 | 1 | 2 | 3 | 6 | 12 | −6 | 5 | Transfer to Europa League |
| 4 | (Denmark) Copenhagen | 6 | 0 | 3 | 3 | 1 | 12 | −11 | 3 | |

Source: UEFA
Rules for classification: Group stage tiebreakers

| 6 September 2022 1 | Borussia Dortmund (Germany) | 3–0 | (Denmark) Copenhagen | Dortmund, Germany |
| 18:45 CET | Reus 35' (Brandt); Guerreiro 42' (Reyna); Bellingham 83' (Reyna) | FCK Report | Khocholava (yellow card) 27'; Lerager (yellow card) 61' | Stadium: Westfalenstadion; Attendance: 70,700; Referee: François Letexier (France) |

| 14 September 2022 2 | Copenhagen (Denmark) | 0–0 | (Spain) Sevilla | Copenhagen |
| 21:00 CET | Daramy (yellow card) 11'; Claesson (yellow card) 58'; Stamenić (yellow card) 82' | FCK Report | Jordán (yellow card) 75'; Carmona (yellow card) 90+4' | Stadium: Parken Stadium; Attendance: 34,910; Referee: Irfan Peljto (Bosnia and Herzegovina) |

| 5 October 2022 3 | Manchester City (England) | 5–0 | (Denmark) Copenhagen | Manchester, England |
| 21:00 CET | Haaland 7' 32'; Khocholava 39' (o.g.); Mahrez 55' (pen.); Álvarez 76' (Mahrez) | FCK Summary | Stamenić (yellow card) 54' | Stadium: City of Manchester Stadium; Attendance: 51,785; Referee: Donatas Rumšas (Lithuania) |

| 11 October 2022 4 | Copenhagen (Denmark) | 0–0 | (England) Manchester City | Copenhagen |
| 18:45 CET | Lund (yellow card) 36'; Stamenić (yellow card) 82' | FCK Summary | Gómez (red card) 30'; Dias (yellow card) 90+2' | Stadium: Parken Stadium; Attendance: 35,447; Referee: Artur Soares Dias (Portugal) |

| 25 October 2022 5 | Sevilla (Spain) | 3–0 | (Denmark) Copenhagen | Sevilla, Spain |
| 18:45 CET | En-Nesyri 61' (Gómez); Lamela (yellow card) 72'; Montiel (yellow card) 78' (goal) 90+2'; Isco 88' (Acuña) | FCK Summary | Claesson (yellow card) 69'; Sørensen (yellow card) 86'; Khocholava (red card) 90+4' | Stadium: Ramón Sánchez Pizjuán Stadium; Attendance: 29,884; Referee: Benoît Bastien (France) |

| 2 November 2022 6 | Copenhagen (Denmark) | 1–1 | (Germany) Borussia Dortmund | Copenhagen |
| 21:00 CET | Haraldsson 41' (Claesson); Vavro (yellow card) 47'; Lerager (yellow card) 66' | FCK Summary | Hazard 23'; Modeste (yellow card) 45+2'; Can (yellow card) 84' | Stadium: Parken Stadium; Attendance: 31,900; Referee: Aliyar Aghayev (Azerbaijan) |

== Statistics ==
=== Appearances ===
This includes all competitive matches and refers to all squad members playing throughout the season, regardless of their current roster status.

| Rank | Pos | No. | Player | Superliga | Danish Cup | UEFA Champions League | Total |
|---|---|---|---|---|---|---|---|
| 1 | MF | 7 | (Sweden) Viktor Claesson | 30 | 7 | 8 | 45 |
| 2 | MF | 12 | (Denmark) Lukas Lerager | 30 | 5 | 8 | 43 |
| 2 | MF | 30 | (Iceland) Hákon Arnar Haraldsson | 29 | 6 | 8 | 43 |
| 4 | FW | 15 | (Denmark) (Sierra Leone) Mohamed Daramy | 28 | 6 | 7 | 41 |
| 4 | DF | 3 | (Slovakia) Denis Vavro | 29 | 5 | 7 | 41 |
| 6 | DF | 2 | (Netherlands) Kevin Diks | 24 | 6 | 8 | 38 |
| 6 | MF | 33 | (Denmark) Rasmus Falk | 27 | 6 | 5 | 38 |
| 8 | DF | 19 | (Denmark) Elias Jelert | 26 | 7 | 4 | 37 |
| 9 | MF | 8 | (Iceland) Ísak Bergmann Jóhannesson | 22 | 5 | 6 | 33 |
| 10 | GK | 1 | (Poland) Kamil Grabara | 23 | 5 | 4 | 32 |
| 11 | DF | 27 | (Denmark) Valdemar Lund | 19 | 6 | 5 | 30 |
| 12 | DF | 6 | (Denmark) Christian Sørensen | 17 | 7 | 5 | 29 |
| 13 | DF | 5 | (Georgia (country)) Davit Khocholava | 17 | 3 | 7 | 27 |
| 14 | MF | 40 | (Sweden) Roony Bardghji | 18 | 6 | 2 | 26 |
| 14 | FW | 36 | (Denmark) William Clem | 17 | 7 | 2 | 26 |
| 16 | DF | 34 | (Denmark) Victor Kristiansen | 15 | 1 | 8 | 24 |
| 17 | MF | 35 | (New Zealand) Marko Stamenić | 15 | 3 | 4 | 22 |
| 18 | MF | 9 | (Portugal) Diogo Gonçalves | 14 | 4 | 0 | 18 |
| 19 | DF | 22 | (Denmark) Peter Ankersen | 12 | 2 | 2 | 16 |
| 19 | FW | 25 | (Sweden) Jordan Larsson | 12 | 4 | 0 | 16 |
| 21 | FW | 14 | (Denmark) Andreas Cornelius | 11 | 1 | 2 | 14 |
| 22 | GK | 51 | (Australia) (Scotland) Mathew Ryan | 6 | 1 | 4 | 11 |
| 22 | MF | 10 | (Greece) (Portugal) Zeca | 7 | 0 | 4 | 11 |
| 24 | DF | 20 | (Denmark) Nicolai Boilesen | 8 | 0 | 2 | 10 |
| 24 | MF | 17 | (Nigeria) Paul Mukairu | 5 | 1 | 4 | 10 |
| 26 | MF | 16 | (Spain) Pep Biel | 7 | 0 | 2 | 9 |
| 27 | FW | 18 | (Iceland) Orri Óskarsson | 4 | 2 | 2 | 8 |
| 27 | FW | 29 | (France) Mamoudou Karamoko | 5 | 1 | 2 | 8 |
| 29 | GK | 21 | (Sweden) Karl-Johan Johnsson | 4 | 1 | 0 | 5 |
| 30 | MF | 24 | (Denmark) William Bøving | 3 | 0 | 1 | 4 |
| 31 | FW | 11 | (Senegal) Khouma Babacar | 3 | 0 | 0 | 3 |
| 32 | MF | 23 | (Nigeria) Akinkunmi Amoo | 2 | 0 | 0 | 2 |
| 33 | FW | 46 | (Denmark) Noah Sahsah | 0 | 1 | 0 | 1 |

=== Goalscorers ===
This includes all competitive matches.

| Rnk | Pos | No. | Player | Superliga | Danish Cup | UEFA Champions League | Total |
|---|---|---|---|---|---|---|---|
| 1 | MF | 7 | (Sweden) Viktor Claesson | 12 | 3 | 1 | 17 |
| 2 | FW | 15 | (Denmark) (Sierra Leone) Mohamed Daramy | 8 | 1 | 0 | 9 |
| 2 | MF | 9 | (Portugal) Diogo Gonçalves | 6 | 3 | 0 | 9 |
| 4 | MF | 16 | (Spain) Pep Biel | 6 | 0 | 0 | 6 |
| 4 | MF | 12 | (Denmark) Lukas Lerager | 6 | 0 | 0 | 6 |
| 4 | FW | 25 | (Sweden) Jordan Larsson | 4 | 2 | 0 | 6 |
| 7 | MF | 30 | (Iceland) Hákon Arnar Haraldsson | 4 | 0 | 1 | 5 |
| 8 | MF | 40 | (Sweden) Roony Bardghji | 3 | 0 | 0 | 3 |
| 8 | DF | 3 | (Slovakia) Denis Vavro | 1 | 1 | 1 | 3 |
| 10 | FW | 14 | (Denmark) Andreas Cornelius | 0 | 2 | 0 | 2 |
| 10 | MF | 33 | (Denmark) Rasmus Falk | 2 | 0 | 0 | 2 |
| 10 | DF | 6 | (Denmark) Christian Sørensen | 2 | 0 | 0 | 2 |
| 13 | MF | 8 | (Iceland) Ísak Bergmann Jóhannesson | 1 | 0 | 0 | 1 |
| 13 | DF | 27 | (Denmark) Valdemar Lund | 1 | 0 | 0 | 1 |
| 13 | DF | 5 | (Georgia (country)) Davit Khocholava | 0 | 1 | 0 | 1 |
| 13 | FW | 18 | (Iceland) Orri Óskarsson | 0 | 1 | 0 | 1 |
| 13 | DF | 34 | (Denmark) Victor Kristiansen | 1 | 0 | 0 | 1 |
| 13 | DF | 19 | (Denmark) Elias Jelert | 1 | 0 | 0 | 1 |
| 13 | DF | 1 | (Netherlands) Kevin Diks | 1 | 0 | 0 | 1 |
| | O.G. | | Opponent Own goal | 2 | 0 | 0 | 2 |
| TOTALS | | | | 61 | 14 | 3 | 78 |

=== Assists ===
This includes all competitive matches.

| Rnk | Pos | No. | Player | Superliga | Danish Cup | UEFA Champions League | Total |
|---|---|---|---|---|---|---|---|
| 1 | MF | 7 | (Sweden) Viktor Claesson | 4 | 1 | 1 | 6 |
| 1 | DF | 6 | (Denmark) Christian Sørensen | 1 | 5 | 0 | 6 |
| 3 | FW | 15 | (Denmark) (Sierra Leone) Mohamed Daramy | 4 | 1 | 0 | 5 |
| 3 | MF | 30 | (Iceland) Hákon Arnar Haraldsson | 4 | 1 | 0 | 5 |
| 5 | DF | 2 | (Netherlands) Kevin Diks | 4 | 0 | 0 | 4 |
| 6 | MF | 16 | (Spain) Pep Biel | 3 | 0 | 0 | 3 |
| 6 | DF | 3 | (Slovakia) Denis Vavro | 1 | 1 | 1 | 3 |
| 6 | MF | 19 | (Denmark) Elias Jelert | 1 | 2 | 0 | 3 |
| 9 | MF | 33 | (Denmark) Rasmus Falk | 1 | 0 | 1 | 2 |
| 9 | MF | 8 | (Iceland) Ísak Bergmann Jóhannesson | 2 | 0 | 0 | 2 |
| 11 | DF | 34 | (Denmark) Victor Kristiansen | 1 | 0 | 0 | 1 |
| 11 | MF | 12 | (Denmark) Lukas Lerager | 1 | 0 | 0 | 1 |
| 11 | MF | 40 | (Sweden) Roony Bardghji | 1 | 0 | 0 | 1 |
| 11 | DF | 19 | (Denmark) Elias Jelert | 1 | 0 | 0 | 1 |
| 11 | FW | 14 | (Denmark) Andreas Cornelius | 1 | 0 | 0 | 1 |
| 11 | MF | 36 | (Denmark) William Clem | 1 | 0 | 0 | 1 |
| 11 | MF | 9 | (Portugal) Diogo Gonçalves | 0 | 1 | 0 | 1 |
| TOTALS | | | | 33 | 10 | 3 | 46 |

=== Clean sheets ===
This includes all competitive matches.

| Rnk | Pos | No. | Player | Superliga | Danish Cup | UEFA Champions League | Total |
|---|---|---|---|---|---|---|---|
| 1 | GK | 1 | (Poland) Kamil Grabara | 7 | 3 | 1 | 11 |
| 2 | GK | 51 | (Australia) (Scotland) Mathew Ryan | 3 | 0 | 2 | 5 |
| 3 | GK | 21 | (Sweden) Karl-Johan Johnsson | 0 | 0 | 0 | 0 |
| TOTALS | | | | 10 | 3 | 3 | 16 |

=== Disciplinary record ===
This includes all competitive matches.

| Rnk | Pos. | No. | Player | Superliga | | Danish Cup | | UEFA Champions League | | Total | |
| Rnk | Pos. | No. | Player | Yellow card | Red card | Yellow card | Red card | Yellow card | Red card | Yellow card | Red card |
| 1 | MF | 30 | (Iceland) Hákon Arnar Haraldsson | 8 | 0 | 4 | 1 | 0 | 0 | 12 | 1 |
| 2 | MF | 7 | (Sweden) Viktor Claesson | 6 | 0 | 1 | 0 | 3 | 0 | 10 | 0 |
| 3 | DF | 5 | (Georgia (country)) Davit Khocholava | 6 | 0 | 1 | 0 | 1 | 1 | 8 | 1 |
| 3 | DF | 3 | (Slovakia) Denis Vavro | 5 | 0 | 2 | 0 | 2 | 0 | 9 | 0 |
| 3 | DF | 2 | (Netherlands) Kevin Diks | 7 | 1 | 1 | 0 | 0 | 0 | 8 | 1 |
| 6 | MF | 12 | (Denmark) Lukas Lerager | 4 | 0 | 1 | 0 | 3 | 0 | 8 | 0 |
| 6 | DF | 19 | (Denmark) Elias Jelert | 7 | 0 | 1 | 0 | 0 | 0 | 8 | 0 |
| 8 | DF | 34 | (Denmark) Victor Kristiansen | 6 | 0 | 0 | 0 | 1 | 0 | 7 | 0 |
| 8 | MF | 35 | (New Zealand) Marko Stamenić | 4 | 0 | 0 | 0 | 3 | 0 | 7 | 0 |
| 8 | DF | 27 | (Denmark) Valdemar Lund | 5 | 0 | 1 | 0 | 1 | 0 | 7 | 0 |
| 11 | MF | 8 | (Iceland) Ísak Bergmann Jóhannesson | 4 | 0 | 1 | 0 | 0 | 0 | 5 | 0 |
| 12 | DF | 6 | (Denmark) Christian Sørensen | 2 | 0 | 1 | 0 | 1 | 0 | 4 | 0 |
| 12 | FW | 36 | (Denmark) William Clem | 2 | 0 | 2 | 0 | 0 | 0 | 4 | 0 |
| 14 | FW | 15 | (Denmark) (Sierra Leone) Mohamed Daramy | 2 | 0 | 0 | 0 | 1 | 0 | 3 | 0 |
| 14 | DF | 22 | (Denmark) Peter Ankersen | 2 | 0 | 1 | 0 | 0 | 0 | 3 | 0 |
| 14 | GK | 1 | (Poland) Kamil Grabara | 2 | 0 | 1 | 0 | 0 | 0 | 3 | 0 |
| 17 | MF | 10 | (Greece) (Portugal) Zeca | 2 | 0 | 0 | 0 | 0 | 0 | 2 | 0 |
| 17 | DF | 20 | (Denmark) Nicolai Boilesen | 2 | 0 | 0 | 0 | 0 | 0 | 2 | 0 |
| 17 | MF | 9 | (Portugal) Diogo Gonçalves | 1 | 0 | 1 | 0 | 0 | 0 | 2 | 0 |
| 21 | GK | 51 | (Australia) (Scotland) Mathew Ryan | 0 | 0 | 0 | 0 | 1 | 0 | 1 | 0 |
| 21 | FW | 14 | (Denmark) Andreas Cornelius | 1 | 0 | 0 | 0 | 0 | 0 | 1 | 0 |
| 21 | MF | 33 | (Denmark) Rasmus Falk | 1 | 0 | 0 | 0 | 0 | 0 | 1 | 0 |
| 21 | MF | 40 | (Sweden) Roony Bardghji | 1 | 0 | 0 | 0 | 0 | 0 | 1 | 0 |
| TOTALS | | | | 78 | 1 | 19 | 1 | 17 | 1 | 117 | 3 |
