= Elias Jelert =

Danish footballer (born 2003)

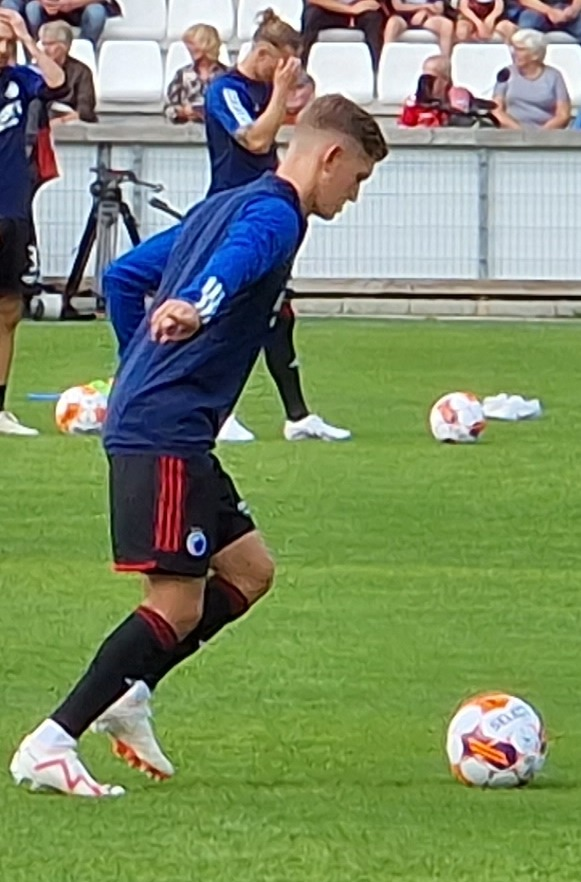
- Jelert in 2023

Personal information
- Full name: Elias Jelert Kristensen
- Date of birth: 12 June 2003 (age 23)
- Place of birth: Virum, Denmark
- Height: 1.78 m (5 ft 10 in)
- Positions: Right-back; right wing-back

Team information
- Current team: Le Havre (on loan from Galatasaray)
- Number: 12

Youth career
- 2008–2014: Virum-Sorgenfri Boldklub
- 2014–2021: Copenhagen

Senior career*
Years	Team	Apps	(Gls)
2021–2024	Copenhagen	66	(1)
2024–	Galatasaray	21	(0)
2025–2026	→ Southampton (loan)	8	(0)
2026–	→ Le Havre (loan)	4	(0)

International career^{‡}
2021–2022	Denmark U19	6	(0)
2023–	Denmark U21	11	(0)
2023–	Denmark	3	(0)
- * Club domestic league appearances and goals as of 22:43, 19 September 2026 (UTC) ‡ National team caps and goals as of 20 March 2025

Elias Jelert Kristensen (born 12 June 2003) is a Danish professional footballer who plays as a right-back or right wing-back for Ligue 1 club Le Havre, on loan from Süper Lig club Galatasaray, and the Denmark national team.

Jelert is a product of the Copenhagen academy and made his professional debut for the club in August 2021. He joined Galatasarary in July 2024. Jelert spent the 2025–26 season on loan at Southampton. He has represented Denmark at youth and full international level.

== Early life ==
Jelert began playing football at the youth academy of Virum-Sorgenfri Boldklub in 2008, and moved to Copenhagen's academy in 2014.

== Club career ==
=== Copenhagen ===
He signed his first professional contract with the club on 11 August 2021. He made his professional debut for Copenhagen in a 1–1 Danish Superliga draw against SønderjyskE on 17 October 2021.

On 24 May 2022, Jelert signed a four-year contract extension, keeping him at Copenhagen until 2026.

Jelert scored his first professional goal for the club on 12 March 2023, closing the score in the 95th minute of a 4–1 league victory against Horsens.

On 24 July 2024, the Copenhagen team announced that an agreement had been reached with Turkish club Galatasaray for the transfer of Jelert.

=== Galatasaray ===
On 25 July 2024, Süper Lig side Galatasaray announced that Jelert had arrived in Istanbul to complete his transfer. In the notification made on the same day, it was announced that a five-year contract was signed. A transfer fee of €9M has been paid to Copenhagen for the transfer.

==== Southampton (loan) ====
On 31 August 2025, Jelert joined Southampton on a season-long loan. He made his debut for the club on 20 September as a late substitute in a 3–1 defeat against Hull City.

==== Le Havre (loan) ====
On 21 August 2026, he joined French team Le Havre on loan until the end of the 2026–27 season.

== International career ==
Jelert is a youth international for Denmark, and has gained six caps for the Denmark national under-19 team.

== Career statistics ==
=== Club ===
As of match played 19 September 2026

Appearances and goals by club, season and competition
Club	Season	League			Domestic Cup		League Cup		Europe		Other		Total	
Club	Season	Division	Apps	Goals	Apps	Goals	Apps	Goals	Apps	Goals	Apps	Goals	Apps	Goals
Copenhagen	2021–22	Danish Superliga	11	0	0	0	—		4 (Note: Appearances in UEFA Europa Conference League)	0	—		15	0
Copenhagen	2022–23	Danish Superliga	26	1	7	0	—		4 (Note: Appearances in UEFA Champions League)	0	—		37	1
Copenhagen	2023–24	Danish Superliga	29	0	3	0	—		13	0	—		45	0
Copenhagen	Total		66	1	10	0	—		21	0	—		97	1
Galatasaray	2024–25	Süper Lig	21	0	3	0	—		11 (Note: Two appearances in UEFA Champions League, nine appearances in UEFA Europa League)	1	—		35	1
Galatasaray	2025–26	Süper Lig	0	0	0	0	—		0	0	—		0	0
Galatasaray	Total		21	0	3	0	—		11	1	—		35	1
Southampton (loan)	2025–26	Championship	8	0	2	0	1	0	—		0	0	11	0
Le Havre (loan)	2026–27	Ligue 1	4	0	0	0	—		—		—		4	0
Career total			99	1	15	0	1	0	32	1	0	0	147	2

=== International ===
As of match played 12 February 2025

Appearances and goals by national team and year
National team	Year	Apps	Goals
Denmark	2023	1	0
Denmark	2024	2	0
Total		3	0

== Honours ==
Copenhagen

- Danish Superliga: 2021–22, 2022–23
- Danish Cup: 2022–23

Galatasaray

- Süper Lig: 2024–25
- Turkish Cup: 2024–25
