= Mohamed Daramy =

Danish footballer (born 2002)

Personal information
- Full name: Mohamed Hassouni Daramy
- Date of birth: 7 January 2002 (age 24)
- Place of birth: Hvidovre, Denmark
- Height: 1.80 m (5 ft 11 in)
- Positions: Winger; forward

Team information
- Current team: Reims
- Number: 9

Youth career
- Hvidovre
- Copenhagen

Senior career*
Years	Team	Apps	(Gls)
2018–2021	Copenhagen	74	(12)
2021–2023	Ajax	12	(1)
2022–2023	→ Copenhagen (loan)	28	(8)
2023–	Reims	46	(9)

International career^{‡}
2020	Denmark U19	1	(0)
2020–2023	Denmark U21	8	(1)
2021–	Denmark	15	(1)
- * Club domestic league appearances and goals as of 07:55, 9 September 2026 (UTC) ‡ National team caps and goals as of 17 November 2026

Mohamed Hassouni Daramy (born 7 January 2002) is a Danish professional footballer who plays as a winger or forward for Ligue 2 club Reims and the Denmark national team.

== Club career ==
=== F.C. Copenhagen ===
Daramy joined Copenhagen from Hvidovre as a U14 player, after reportedly having been linked also to rival Copenhagen side Brøndby. Already at the age of 15, Daramy rose to the title of topscorer of the U17 squad at F.C. Copenhagen, resulting in a three-year contract extension (October 2017 to 2020). With a total 18 goals in 26 games during the 2017–18 season, Daramy became the fifth highest scoring player in that season's U17 league.

At the age of 16 years and 263 days, Daramy became the youngest ever player to score for Copenhagen. The goal came in his official senior level debut for the club in a Danish Cup game against Viby IF. Followed by critical acclaim, numorous high profiled clubs were rumoured of pursuing Daramys signature, with efforts of engaging the young player being led by German Bundesliga side RB Leipzig. In spite of the growing interest, FC Copenhagen managed to keep Daramy on at the club, setting a price tag at €5 million as result of the competitor's woes. Amidst the transfer rumours, Daramy aired doubts about his determination of staying on as an FC Copenhagen player, but ultimately decided to stay.

Following ongoing success in the Danish Capital, in March 2019 FC Copenhagen increased efforts to extend a more lucrative contract to Daramy, followed by an increasing offer size of about €5 million from an unknown outside club. Daramy got his Danish Superliga debut on 2 December 2018 against AC Horsens, replacing Dame N'Doye in the 77th minute, and later that season, on 31 March 2019, Daramy scored his first goal in his native Superliga. Due to the absence of regular first choice Robert Skov who was out with an injury, Daramy found himself included in the starting lineup and ultimately became the man of the match, scoring the only goal in the game.

On 3 April 2019, Daramy officially signed his first professional contract with Copenhagen until the end of 2021. Along with the contract extension, he was also permanently promoted to the first team squad.

=== AFC Ajax ===
On 22 August 2021, AFC Ajax announced that they had closed a €12 million deal with an add-on bonus of €1 million with Copenhagen for the transfer of Daramy. However, the move to the Dutch side proved difficult, as Daramy struggled to retain a regular position on the first team. On 3 August 2022, Daramy returned to Copenhagen on a season-long loan, once again proving his talent and skill, and earning a vital role as his Danish team claimed the championship of the 2022/2023 Superliga season after a close finishing race with Greater Copenhagen side, FC Nordsjælland.

=== Reims ===
On 11 August 2023, Daramy moved to Reims in France on a five-year contract. On 20 August, Daramy came on as a substitute and scored a goal in a 2–0 win against Clermont on his debut.

== International career ==
Daramy made his debut for Denmark national team on 1 September 2021 in a 2022 FIFA World Cup qualification match against Scotland, replacing Andreas Skov Olsen in the 85th minute.

== Style of play ==
Former Schalke 04 striker and Denmark international Ebbe Sand, described Daramy as a player who is fast, strong in "one-on-one situations" and as "extremely talented".

== Personal life ==
Daramy has Sierra Leonean nationality, because both his Oku parents are from Sierra Leone. In December 2018, he revealed that he had applied for Danish nationality and would like to play for the Danish national team. He became a Danish citizen in January 2020.

== Career statistics ==
=== Club ===
As of match played on 5 September 2026

Appearances and goals by club, season and competition
Club	Season	League			Cup (Note: Includes Danish Cup, KNVB Cup, Coupe de France)		Europe		Total	
Club	Season	Division	Apps	Goals	Apps	Goals	Apps	Goals	Apps	Goals
Copenhagen	2018–19	Danish Superliga	11	1	1	1	0	0	12	2
Copenhagen	2019–20	Danish Superliga	29	4	3	2	9 (Note: One appearance in UEFA Champions League, eight appearance and one goal in UEFA Europa League)	1	41	7
Copenhagen	2020–21	Danish Superliga	28	5	1	0	0	0	29	5
Copenhagen	2021–22	Danish Superliga	6	2	0	0	5 (Note: Appearances in UEFA Conference League)	2	11	4
Copenhagen	Total		74	12	5	3	14	3	93	18
Ajax	2021–22	Eredivisie	12	1	2	2	2 (Note: Appearances in UEFA Champions League)	0	16	3
Copenhagen (loan)	2022–23	Danish Superliga	28	8	6	1	7	0	41	9
Reims	2023–24	Ligue 1	25	4	2	1	—		27	5
Reims	2024–25	Ligue 1	2	0	0	0	—		2	0
Reims	2025–26	Ligue 2	15	4	5	0	—		20	5
Reims	2026–27	Ligue 2	4	0	0	0	—		4	0
Reims	Total		46	9	7	1	—		53	10
Career total			150	28	120	6	23	3	193	38

=== International ===
As of match played 17 November 2026

Appearances and goals by national team and year
National team	Year	Apps	Goals
Denmark	2021	4	0
Denmark	2022	0	0
Denmark	2023	5	0
Denmark	2024	1	1
Denmark	2025	0	0
Denmark	2026	5	0
Total		15	1

Scores and results list Denmark's goal tally first, score column indicates score after each Daramy goal.

List of international goals scored by Mohamed Daramy
No.	Date	Venue	Cap	Opponent	Score	Result	Competition
1	26 March 2024	Brøndby Stadium, Brøndbyvester, Denmark	10	Faroe Islands	2–0	2–0	Friendly

== Honours ==
Copenhagen

- Danish Superliga: 2018–19, 2021–22, 2022–23
- Danish Cup: 2022–23

Ajax

- Eredivisie: 2021–22
