= Christian Sørensen =

Danish footballer (born 1992)

Personal information
- Full name: Christian Nikolaj Sørensen
- Date of birth: 6 August 1992 (age 34)
- Place of birth: Denmark
- Height: 1.79 m (5 ft 10 in)
- Position: Left-back

Team information
- Current team: Vejle
- Number: 3

Youth career
- Sanderum BK
- Næsby BK
- OB

Senior career*
| Years | Team | Apps | (Gls) |
| 2011–2013 | OB | 15 | (2) |
| 2013–2016 | Silkeborg | 46 | (6) |
| 2016–2017 | Þróttur | 12 | (2) |
| 2017–2019 | Fredericia | 75 | (16) |
| 2019–2022 | Viborg | 100 | (9) |
| 2022–2024 | Copenhagen | 37 | (2) |
| 2024–2025 | Midtjylland | 6 | (0) |
| 2025– | Vejle | 25 | (0) |
- * Club domestic league appearances and goals as of 19 May 2026

Christian Nikolaj Sørensen (born 6 August 1992) is a Danish professional footballer who plays as a left-back for Vejle Boldklub.

== Club career ==
Sørensen started his football career in Verninge, but has also played for Sanderum and Næsby BK, before he joined Odense Boldklub.

Sørensen joined Odense Boldklub on 1 June 2011. He made his official debut on 16 July against FC Nordsjælland. He scored his first goal against Lyngby BK in the Danish Superliga on 20 August 2011.

After leaving FC Fredericia, Sørensen joined Viborg FF on 9 July 2019 on a three-year contract. After a few successful seasons at Viborg, it was confirmed on 31 August 2022 that 30-year old Sørensen had joined the Danish champions, F.C. Copenhagen, on a deal until the end of 2025.

In the summer 2025, Sørensen joined Vejle Boldklub on a contract until 30 June 2028.

== International career ==
Sørensen played one game with the Denmark U19 national team. He was later a part of the Denmark U21.

== Career statistics ==
As of match played 3 November 2024

Appearances and goals by club, season and competition
| Club | Season | League | | | Cup | | Europe | | Other | | Total | |
| Club | Season | Division | Apps | Goals | Apps | Goals | Apps | Goals | Apps | Goals | Apps | Goals |
|---|---|---|---|---|---|---|---|---|---|---|---|---|
| OB | 2011–12 | Danish Superliga | 11 | 1 | 1 | 0 | 6 (Note: 1 appearance in UEFA Champions League, and 5 appearances in UEFA Europa League) | 0 | — | | 18 | 1 |
| OB | 2012–13 | Danish Superliga | 3 | 1 | 0 | 0 | 0 | 0 | — | | 3 | 1 |
| OB | Total | | 14 | 2 | 1 | 0 | 6 | 0 | — | | 21 | 2 |
| Silkeborg | 2013–14 | Danish 1st Division | 27 | 6 | 1 | 0 | — | | — | | 28 | 6 |
| Silkeborg | 2014–15 | Danish Superliga | 9 | 0 | 2 | 0 | — | | — | | 11 | 0 |
| Silkeborg | 2015–16 | Danish 1st Division | 10 | 0 | 3 | 2 | — | | — | | 13 | 2 |
| Silkeborg | Total | | 46 | 6 | 6 | 2 | — | | — | | 52 | 8 |
| Þróttur | 2016 | Úrvalsdeild | 12 | 2 | 0 | 0 | — | | — | | 12 | 2 |
| Fredericia | 2016–17 | Danish 1st Division | 13 | 2 | 0 | 0 | — | | — | | 13 | 2 |
| Fredericia | 2017–18 | Danish 1st Division | 29 | 3 | 6 | 1 | — | | — | | 35 | 4 |
| Fredericia | 2018–19 | Danish 1st Division | 33 | 11 | 2 | 1 | — | | — | | 35 | 12 |
| Fredericia | Total | | 75 | 16 | 7 | 2 | — | | — | | 95 | 20 |
| Viborg | 2019–20 | Danish 1st Division | 29 | 1 | 2 | 0 | — | | — | | 31 | 1 |
| Viborg | 2020–21 | Danish 1st Division | 31 | 4 | 2 | 1 | — | | — | | 33 | 5 |
| Viborg | 2021–22 | Danish Superliga | 32 | 2 | 0 | 0 | — | | 1 (Note: Appearances in Superliga European play-offs) | 0 | 33 | 2 |
| Viborg | 2022–23 | Danish Superliga | 7 | 2 | 0 | 0 | 6 (Note: Appearances in UEFA Europa Conference League) | 0 | — | | 13 | 2 |
| Viborg | Total | | 99 | 9 | 4 | 1 | 6 | 0 | 1 | 0 | 110 | 10 |
| Copenhagen | 2022–23 | Danish Superliga | 17 | 2 | 7 | 0 | 5 (Note: Appearances in UEFA Champions League) | 0 | — | | 29 | 2 |
| Copenhagen | 2023–24 | Danish Superliga | 19 | 0 | 3 | 1 | 7 | 0 | — | | 29 | 1 |
| Copenhagen | 2024–25 | Danish Superliga | 1 | 0 | 0 | 0 | 2 | 0 | — | | 3 | 0 |
| Copenhagen | Total | | 37 | 2 | 10 | 1 | 14 | 0 | — | | 61 | 3 |
| Midtjylland | 2024–25 | Danish Superliga | 4 | 0 | 1 | 0 | 0 | 0 | — | | 5 | 0 |
| Career total | | | 287 | 37 | 30 | 6 | 26 | 0 | 1 | 0 | 344 | 43 |

== Honours ==
Viborg

- Danish 1st Division: 2020–21

Copenhagen

- Danish Superliga: 2022–23
- Danish Cup: 2022–23
