= Viktor Claesson =

Swedish footballer (born 1992)

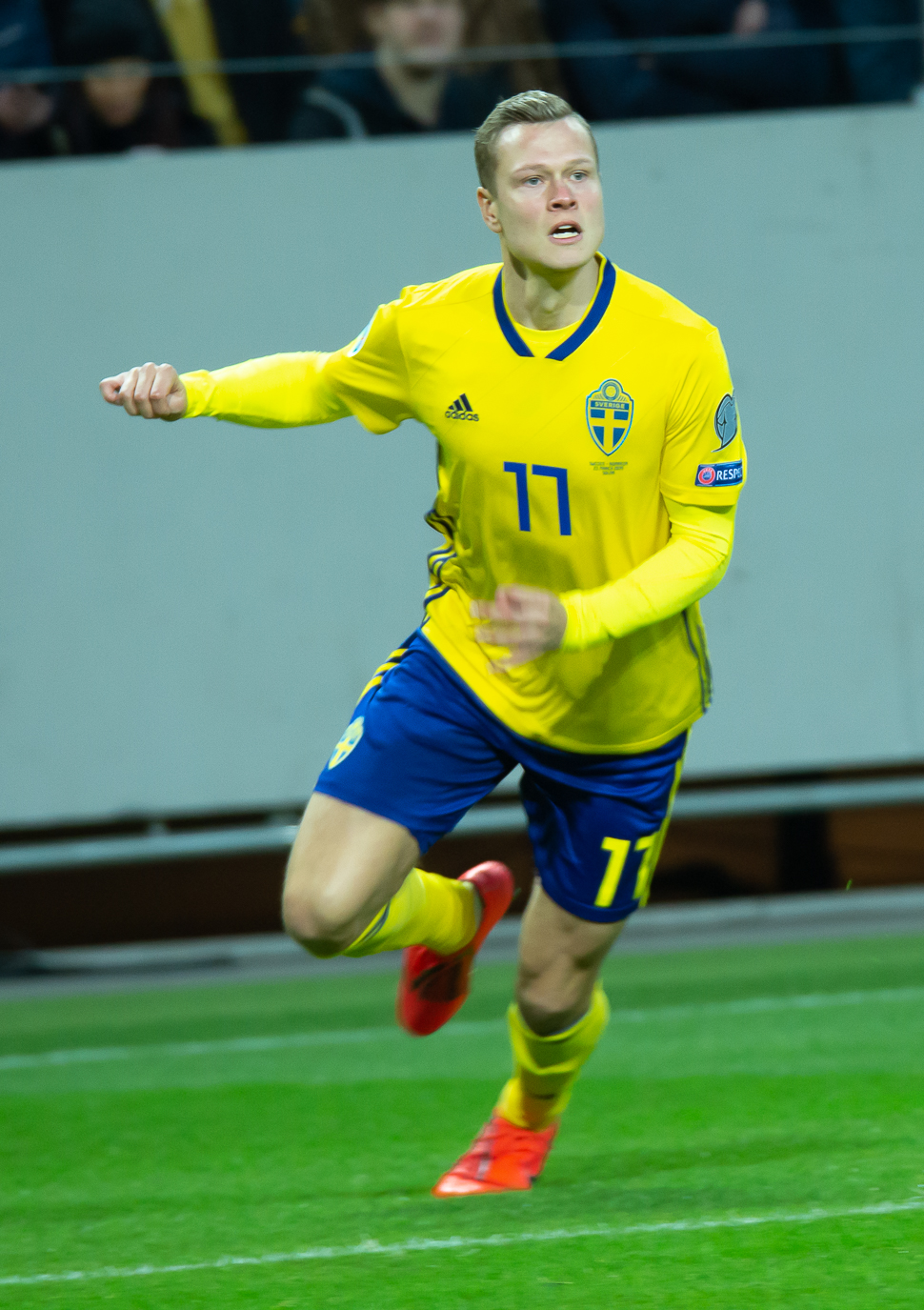
- Claesson playing for Sweden in 2019

Personal information
- Full name: Viktor Johan Anton Claesson
- Date of birth: 2 January 1992 (age 34)
- Place of birth: Värnamo, Sweden
- Height: 1.83 m (6 ft 0 in)
- Position: Left winger

Team information
- Current team: IFK Värnamo
- Number: 10

Youth career
- –2008: IFK Värnamo

Senior career*
Years	Team	Apps	(Gls)
2008–2011	IFK Värnamo	71	(29)
2012–2016	IF Elfsborg	134	(32)
2017–2022	Krasnodar	114	(32)
2022–2026	Copenhagen	123	(31)
2026–	IFK Värnamo	16	(6)

International career
2008	Sweden U17	2	(0)
2009–2010	Sweden U19	9	(3)
2011–2015	Sweden U21	20	(1)
2012–2023	Sweden	74	(15)
- * Club domestic league appearances and goals as of 12 November 2026

Viktor Johan Anton Claesson (Swedish pronunciation: [ˈvɪ̌kːtɔr ˈklɑ̌ːsɔn]; born 2 January 1992) is a Swedish professional footballer who plays as a left winger for IFK Värnamo, which he captains. He is known for his passing and set piece abilities.

A full international between 2012 and 2023, Claesson won 74 caps and scored 15 goals for the Sweden national team. He represented his country at the 2018 FIFA World Cup and UEFA Euro 2020.

== Club career ==
=== Early career ===
Claesson started his career with local club IFK Värnamo. After progressing through the youth ranks, he made his senior debut in 2009 in a Division 1 Södra match. After a breakthrough campaign during the 2011 Superettan season, Claesson join IF Elfsborg in the Allsvenskan, the top division of Swedish football.

=== Krasnodar ===
On 25 January 2017, Claesson signed a 3.5-year contract with Russian Premier League team FC Krasnodar. He scored on his debut on 16 February 2017 in a 1–0 Europa League Round of 32 win against Turkish Süper Lig side Fenerbahçe, scoring a header on his first touch in any competitive Krasnodar game in the 4th minute. He was selected by UEFA as "Man of the Match". He continued his form with two goals in a Russian Cup game against FC Ural Sverdlovsk Oblast on 28 February 2017 and a goal against Celta de Vigo in the first leg of Europa League Round of 16 on 9 March 2017.

Claesson missed all of the 2019–20 season with a serious knee injury.

==== 2020–21 season ====
Out of action for over 14 months, Claesson returned from injury on 18 August 2020, playing the last 15 minutes of Krasnodar's 2–0 home win over Arsenal Tula in the Russian Premier League. On 18 September, he scored his first two goals since his return from injury in a 7–2 thrashing of Khimki. Four days later, Claesson scored from the penalty spot in the club's first-leg play-off round match against PAOK for qualification to the group stage of the UEFA Champions League. Krasnodar would win the second leg against PAOK by the same scoreline and secure progression to the group stage of the Champions League for the first time in the club's history.

==== 2021–22 season ====
On 3 March 2022 Krasnodar announced that his contract was suspended and he would not train with the team, but the contract was not terminated and remained valid. On 5 March 2022, his contract was terminated and he was released from the club.

=== Copenhagen ===
On 30 March 2022, Claesson signed with Copenhagen in Denmark until the end of the season. On 3 April, he scored the winning goal in his debut match for the club after coming on as a substitute in the 61st minute.

On 16 June 2022, Claesson signed an extension with Copenhagen until 2026.

=== Värnamo ===
In January 2026, it was announced that Claesson will return to his childhood club IFK Värnamo when his contract with Copenhagen expires at the end of June. He started and scored in his first match with Värnamo when he returned, in a 2-3 defeat against Ljungskile.

== International career ==
In May 2018, Claesson was named in Sweden's 23-man squad for the 2018 FIFA World Cup in Russia. He was one of Sweden's main men for the duration of the tournament, in which the Blågult reached the quarterfinals.

In a UEFA Euro 2020 qualifier against Spain on 10 June 2019, Claesson suffered a serious knee injury, rupturing the cruciate knee ligaments, after a clash with Jordi Alba.

He was named in Sweden's UEFA Euro 2020 squad, and appeared in all four games as Sweden was eliminated in the round of 16 by Ukraine. He scored the winning goal in a 3–2 win against Poland in the group stage. On 19 November 2023, Claesson registered one goal and one assist against Estonia in their 2–0 win in their European Qualifiers game.

In October 2025, he announced his retirement from the national team. He was capped 74 times and scored 15 goals.

== Career statistics ==
=== Club ===
As of match played 21 May 2026

Appearances and goals by club, season and competition
Club	Season	League			National cup (Note: Includes Svenska Cupen, Russian Cup, Danish Cup)		Europe		Other		Total	
Club	Season	Division	Apps	Goals	Apps	Goals	Apps	Goals	Apps	Goals	Apps	Goals
IFK Värnamo	2009	Division 1 Södra	16	5	—		—		—		16	5
IFK Värnamo	2010	Division 1 Södra	25	11	1	0	—		2	0	28	11
IFK Värnamo	2011	Superettan	29	13	1	0	—		—		30	13
IFK Värnamo	Total		70	29	2	0	—		2	0	74	29
IF Elfsborg	2012	Allsvenskan	27	5	0	0	6 (Note: Appearances in UEFA Europa League)	2	—		33	7
IF Elfsborg	2013	Allsvenskan	23	3	3	0	8 (Note: Two appearances and two goals in UEFA Champions League, six appearances and one goal in UEFA Europa League)	3	—		34	6
IF Elfsborg	2014	Allsvenskan	26	5	7	2	6	0	—		39	7
IF Elfsborg	2015	Allsvenskan	29	11	5	3	6	1	—		40	15
IF Elfsborg	2016	Allsvenskan	29	8	3	2	—		—		32	10
IF Elfsborg	Total		134	32	18	7	26	6	0	0	178	45
Krasnodar	2016–17	Russian Premier League	13	1	1	2	4	2	–		18	5
Krasnodar	2017–18	Russian Premier League	30	10	0	0	4	2	—		34	12
Krasnodar	2018–19	Russian Premier League	29	12	4	1	9	2	—		42	15
Krasnodar	2019–20	Russian Premier League	0	0	0	0	0	0	—		0	0
Krasnodar	2020–21	Russian Premier League	24	6	1	0	8 (Note: Six appearances and one goal in UEFA Champions League, two appearances and one goal in UEFA Europa League)	2	—		33	8
Krasnodar	2021–22	Russian Premier League	18	3	2	0	—		—		20	3
Krasnodar	Total		114	32	8	3	25	8	0	0	147	43
Copenhagen	2021–22	Danish Superliga	10	1	—		—		—		10	1
Copenhagen	2022–23	Danish Superliga	30	13	7	3	8 (Note: Appearances in UEFA Champions League)	1	—		45	17
Copenhagen	2023–24	Danish Superliga	25	5	4	0	11	2	1	0	41	7
Copenhagen	2024–25	Danish Superliga	28	6	6	1	11 (Note: Appearances in UEFA Conference League)	1	—		45	8
Copenhagen	2025–26	Danish Superliga	30	6	5	1	13	0	—		48	7
Copenhagen	Total		123	31	22	5	43	4	1	0	189	40
Career total			441	124	50	15	94	18	3	0	588	157

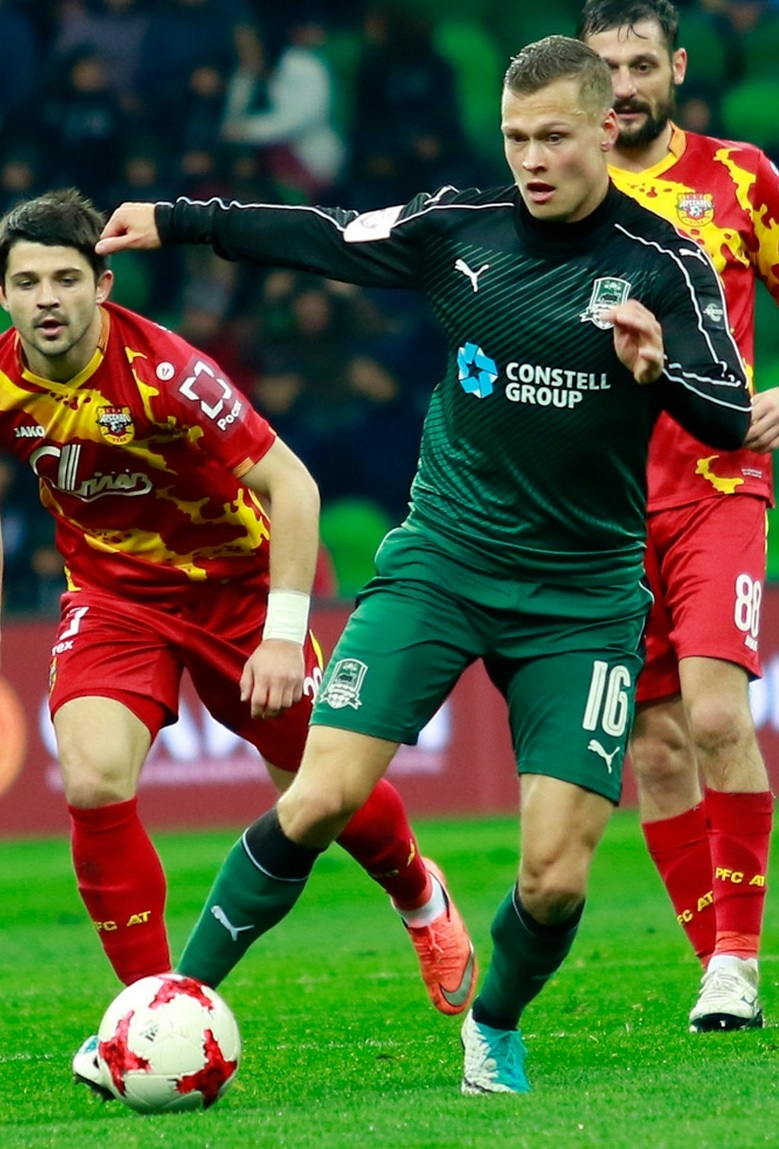
Claesson playing for Krasnodar in 2017.

=== International ===
Appearances and goals by national team and year
National team	Year	Apps	Goals
Sweden	2012	2	1
Sweden	2013	2	0
Sweden	2014	0	0
Sweden	2015	0	0
Sweden	2016	3	0
Sweden	2017	12	2
Sweden	2018	14	1
Sweden	2019	4	3
Sweden	2020	5	1
Sweden	2021	15	3
Sweden	2022	8	2
Sweden	2023	9	2
Total		74	15

Scores and results list Sweden's goal tally first, score column indicates score after each Claesson goal.

List of international goals scored by Viktor Claesson
No.	Date	Venue	Opponent	Score	Result	Competition	Ref.
1	23 January 2012	Khalifa International Stadium, Doha, Qatar	Qatar	2–0	5–0	Friendly	
2	28 March 2017	Estádio do Marítimo, Funchal, Portugal	Portugal	1–2	3–2	Friendly	
3	28 March 2017	Estádio do Marítimo, Funchal, Portugal	Portugal	2–2	3–2	Friendly	
4	10 September 2018	Friends Arena, Solna, Sweden	Turkey	2–0	2–3	2018–19 UEFA Nations League B	
5	23 March 2019	Friends Arena, Solna, Sweden	Romania	2–0	2–1	UEFA Euro 2020 qualifying	
6	26 March 2019	Ullevaal Stadion, Oslo, Norway	Norway	1–2	3–3	UEFA Euro 2020 qualifying	
7	7 June 2019	Friends Arena, Solna, Sweden	Malta	2–0	3–0	UEFA Euro 2020 qualifying	
8	17 November 2020	Stade de France, Saint-Denis, France	France	1–0	2–4	2020–21 UEFA Nations League A	
9	25 March 2021	Friends Arena, Solna, Sweden	Georgia	1–0	1–0	2022 FIFA World Cup qualification	
10	23 June 2021	Krestovsky Stadium, Saint Petersburg, Russia	Poland	3–2	3–2	UEFA Euro 2020	
11	2 September 2021	Friends Arena, Solna, Sweden	Spain	2–1	2–1	2022 FIFA World Cup qualification	
12	24 September 2022	Rajko Mitić Stadium, Belgrade, Serbia	Serbia	1–0	1–4	2022–23 UEFA Nations League B	
13	19 November 2022	Stadion, Malmö, Malmö, Sweden	Algeria	2–0	2–0	Friendly	
14	9 September 2023	Lilleküla Stadium, Tallinn, Estonia	Estonia	5–0	5–0	UEFA Euro 2024 qualifying	
15	19 November 2023	Friends Arena, Solna, Sweden	Estonia	1–0	2–0	UEFA Euro 2024 qualifying	

== Honours ==
Elfsborg

- Allsvenskan: 2012
- Svenska Cupen: 2013–14

Copenhagen

- Danish Superliga: 2021–22, 2022–23, 2024–25
- Danish Cup: 2022–23 2024–25

Sweden

- King's Cup: 2013

Individual

- Allsvenskan top assist provider: 2015
- Swedish Midfielder of the Year: 2018
- Stor Grabb: 2018
- Russian Premier League Left Winger of the Season: 2018–19
