= Hákon Haraldsson =

Icelandic footballer (born 2003)

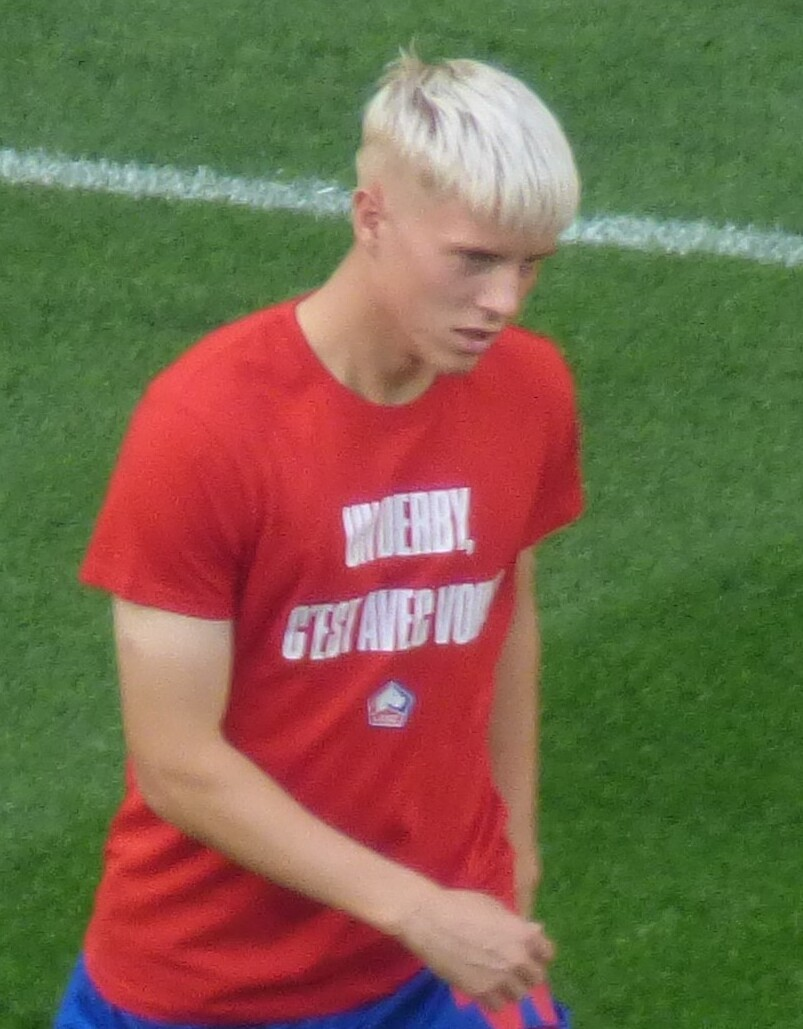
- Hákon with Lille in 2023

Personal information
- Full name: Hákon Arnar Haraldsson
- Date of birth: 10 April 2003 (age 23)
- Place of birth: Akranes, Iceland
- Height: 1.80 m (5 ft 11 in)
- Positions: Attacking midfielder; winger

Team information
- Current team: Lille
- Number: 10

Youth career
- 2006–2019: ÍA
- 2019–2021: Copenhagen

Senior career*
Years	Team	Apps	(Gls)
2019	ÍA	0	(0)
2021–2023	Copenhagen	40	(8)
2023–	Lille	94	(16)

International career^{‡}
2017–2018	Iceland U15	4	(1)
2019	Iceland U16	6	(3)
2019–2020	Iceland U17	15	(1)
2021	Iceland U19	3	(1)
2020–2021	Iceland U21	5	(2)
2022–	Iceland	37	(3)
- * Club domestic league appearances and goals as of 21 November 2026 ‡ National team caps and goals as of 16 November 2026

Hákon Arnar Haraldsson (born 10 April 2003) is an Icelandic professional footballer who plays as an attacking midfielder or winger for Ligue 1 club Lille and the Iceland national team.

== Club career ==
Hákon is a youth academy graduate of Icelandic club ÍA. He made his senior debut for the club on 26 February 2019 in a 6–0 league cup win against Stjarnan.

In June 2019, Hákon joined youth academy of Danish club Copenhagen. On 21 May 2021, club announced that he had signed a new contract with the club until June 2026. He made his senior debut for the club on 29 July 2021 in a 5–0 UEFA Europa Conference League qualifying round win against Torpedo-BelAZ Zhodino.

On 17 July 2023, Hákon signed for French club Lille, on a five-year contract running until 30 June 2028. The financial details of the transfer include an initial and base fee of €12 million and a maximum of €5 million add-ons depending on sporting conditions.

== International career ==
Hákon Arnar has represented Iceland at various youth levels. On 2 September 2021, he scored twice in his team's 2–1 victory against Belarus in 2023 UEFA European Under-21 Championship qualification stage. He made his Iceland senior team debut on 2 June 2022 in a 2–2 draw against Israel.

== Personal life ==
Hákon was born into a family of footballers. His parents Haraldur Ingólfsson and Jónína Víglundsdóttir are former national team players. His brothers Tryggvi Hrafn and Haukur Andri are also professional footballers.

== Career statistics ==
=== Club ===
As of match played 21 November 2026

Appearances and goals by club, season and competition
Club	Season	League			National cup (Note: Includes Icelandic Cup, Danish Cup, Coupe de France)		League cup (Note: Includes Icelandic League Cup)		Continental		Total	
Club	Season	Division	Apps	Goals	Apps	Goals	Apps	Goals	Apps	Goals	Apps	Goals
ÍA	2019	Úrvalsdeild	0	0	0	0	2	0	—		2	0
Copenhagen	2021–22	Danish Superliga	11	4	0	0	—		4 (Note: Appearances in UEFA Europa Conference League)	0	15	4
Copenhagen	2022–23	Danish Superliga	29	4	6	0	—		8 (Note: Appearances in UEFA Champions League)	1	43	5
Copenhagen	Total		40	8	6	0	—		12	1	58	9
Lille	2023–24	Ligue 1	26	2	2	3	—		10	0	38	5
Lille	2024–25	Ligue 1	25	5	3	1	—		10	2	38	8
Lille	2025–26	Ligue 1	32	8	2	0	—		12 (Note: Appearances in UEFA Europa League)	1	46	9
Lille	2026–27	Ligue 1	11	1	0	0	—		4	0	15	1
Lille	Total		94	16	7	4	—		36	3	137	23
Career total			134	24	13	4	2	0	48	4	197	32

=== International ===
As of match played 16 November 2026

Appearances and goals by national team and year
National team	Year	Apps	Goals
Iceland	2022	7	0
Iceland	2023	8	3
Iceland	2024	4	0
Iceland	2025	9	0
Iceland	2026	9	0
Total		37	3

Scores and results list Iceland's goal tally first, score column indicates score after each Hákon goal.

List of international goals scored by Hákon Haraldsson
No.	Date	Venue	Opponent	Score	Result	Competition
1	26 March 2023	Rheinpark Stadion, Vaduz, Liechtenstein	Liechtenstein	2–0	7–0	UEFA Euro 2024 qualification
2	8 September 2023	Stade de Luxembourg, Luxembourg City, Luxembourg	Luxembourg	1–2	1–3	UEFA Euro 2024 qualification
3	16 October 2023	Laugardalsvöllur, Reykjavík, Iceland	Liechtenstein	4–0	4–0	UEFA Euro 2024 qualification

== Honours ==
Copenhagen

- Danish Superliga: 2021–22, 2022–23
- Danish Cup: 2022–23

International

- Baltic Cup: 2022

Individual

- Icelandic Men's Footballer of the Year: 2022
