= Johan Guadagno =

Italian footballer (born 2003)

Personal information
- Full name: Johan Elia Guadagno
- Date of birth: 21 February 2003 (age 23)
- Place of birth: Milan, Italy
- Height: 1.88 m (6 ft 2 in)
- Position: Goalkeeper

Team information
- Current team: IK Brage
- Number: 30

Youth career
- –2019: BP
- 2019–2021: Manchester United

Senior career*
Years	Team	Apps	(Gls)
2021–2022	Copenhagen	0	(0)
2022–2025	Pisa	0	(0)
2023	→ Fiorenzuola (loan)	5	(0)
2024	→ Latina (loan)	14	(0)
2024–2025	→ Campobasso (loan)	4	(0)
2025	→ Sestri Levante (loan)	14	(0)
2026–	IK Brage	4	(0)
- * Club domestic league appearances and goals as of 12 November 2026

Johan Elia Guadagno (born 21 February 2003) is an Italian-Swedish footballer who plays as a goalkeeper for Superettan club IK Brage.

== Early life ==
Guadagno grew up in Milan, Italy until the age of seven.

== Career ==
Guadagno played for the youth academy of English Premier League side Manchester United, where he was described as "made steady progress... featuring nine times for United’s under-18s... and keeping two clean sheets. However, with many other goalkeepers in United's academy, it has been difficult for the Swede to feature on a more regular basis".

On 1 August 2024, Guadagno joined Campobasso on loan. On 9 January 2025, he moved on a new loan to Sestri Levante.

On 19 February 2026, Guadagno joined Superettan side IK Brage.

== Style of play ==
Guadagno has been described as "body is built to be a goalkeeper... he has the physical conditions and hates to lose".

== Personal life ==
Guadagno has regarded Italy international Gianluigi Buffon.

== Career statistics ==
As of match played 29 September 2024

Appearances and goals by club, season and competition
Club	Season	League			National Cup (Note: Includes Danish Cup, Coppa Italia)		Continental		Other		Total	
Club	Season	Division	Apps	Goals	Apps	Goals	Apps	Goals	Apps	Goals	Apps	Goals
Copenhagen	2021-22	Danish Superliga	0	0	0	0	0	0	—		0	0
Pisa	2022-23	Serie B	0	0	0	0	—		—		0	0
Fiorenzuola (loan)	2023-24	Serie C	5	0	0	0	—		0	0	5	0
Latina (loan)	2023-24	Serie C	14	0	0	0	—		1 (Note: Appearance(s) in Serie C Promotion play-offs)	0	15	0
Campobasso (loan)	2024-25	Serie C	3	0	0	0	—		—		3	0
Career total			22	0	0	0	0	0	1	0	23	0
