= Nummer 10 =

Training ground of F.C. Copenhagen

Coordinates: 55°40′39″N 12°29′54″E

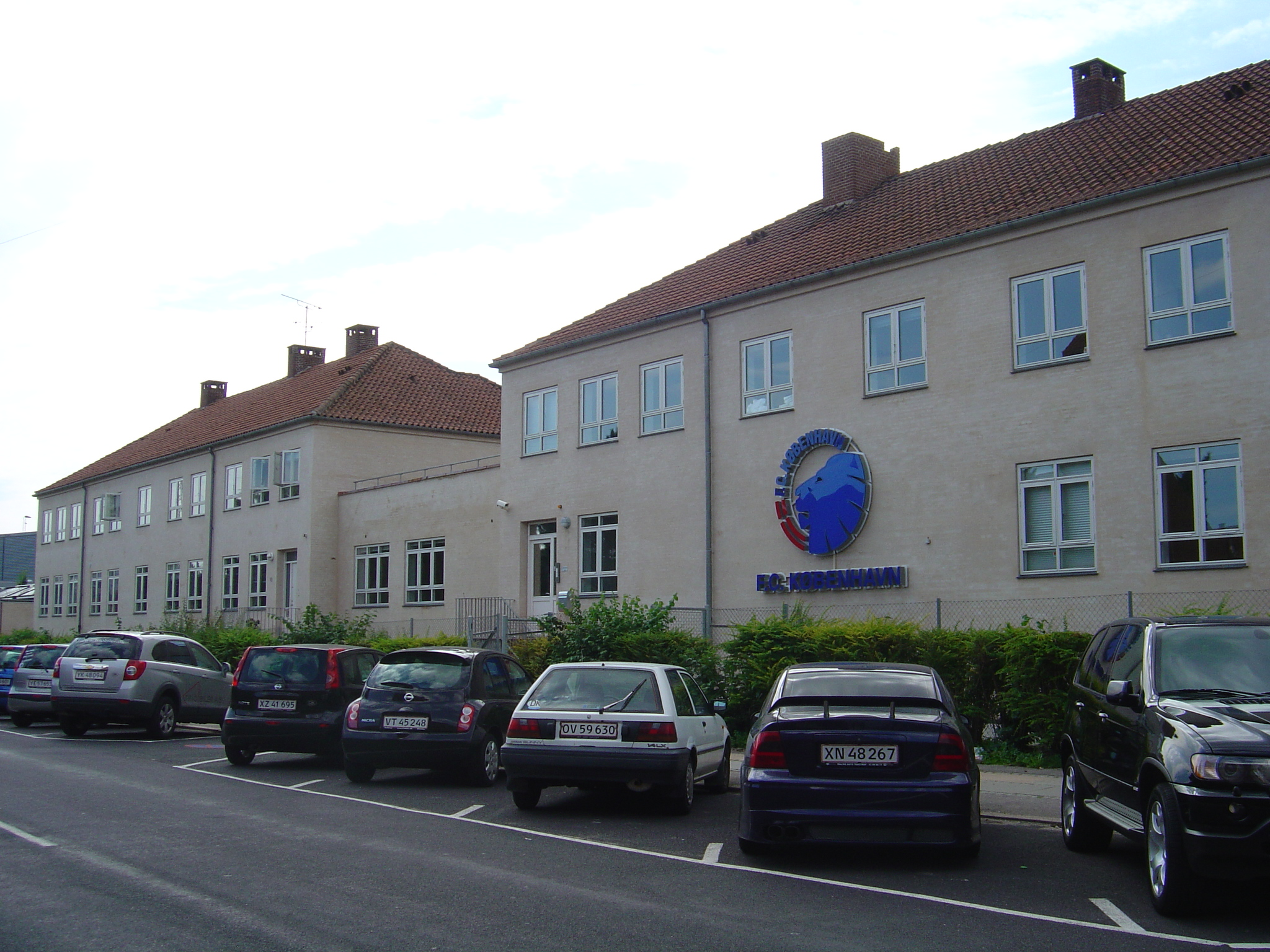
Building housing part of the training complex, shown here in August 2007.

Nummer 10 (English: Number 10), also referred to as 10'eren, is the official training ground for the men's association football teams of F.C. Copenhagen, and since 2024, it has also served as the training facility for the women's team. The complex is located in the municipality of Frederiksberg, an enclave within Copenhagen, Denmark. It was officially opened in 2006 and is situated adjacent to KB's anlæg, the home ground of the club’s parent club, Kjøbenhavns Boldklub (KB). The facility comprises three football training pitches and houses F.C. Copenhagen’s core departments for athletic development and daily operations. It features fitness and recovery areas, tactical meeting rooms, offices for coaching and administrative staff, as well as dressing rooms, a strength training centre, rest rooms, a few residential units, and medical and rehabilitation facilities.

== History ==
Since the club’s foundation in 1992, F.C. Copenhagen has held its training sessions in Frederiksberg, initially at KB's Anlæg at Peter Bangs Vej. After more than a decade at that location, the club took a major step forward in its professional infrastructure by relocating in January 2006 to a purpose-built training centre at Jens Jessens Vej 10 — just next to KB's Anlæg. After the club purchased the house at the location, almost the entire original inventory was stripped down and rebuilt, repurposed for its new use. The complex was officially inaugurated on 26 January 2006 by the Mayor of Frederiksberg Municipality, Mads Lebech, Chairman of the Board Flemming Østergaard, and Sports Director Niels-Christian Holmstrøm. The facility has since served as the central training ground for the men's football team, and as of July 2024, also for the women's team — and until 2010, it was also used by F.C. Copenhagen Handball.

The name was derived, by the employees at F.C. Copenhagen offices, from the address of the training centre, which is Jens Jessens Vej 10, referencing not just the street number, but also carrying a symbolic resonance in football culture. Training sessions are held on one of three 11-a-side association football pitches: Pitch 1 (located closest to KB Hallen), Pitch 2 (adjacent to the clubhouse on Jens Jessens Vej), or Pitch 3 (which runs across the other two). Pitch 3 was originally a natural grass field but was converted into a hybrid turf with underground heating during the 2010s — a change that was also implemented on Pitch 1 in early 2019. New hybrid pitches with new heating pipes, drainage systems, sprinklers, and newly laid growth layers were established in 2024 on Pitch 1 and Pitch 3 in 2022, and now maintained by the same team of groundskeepers responsible for the pitch at Parken Stadium. Over time, the training complex has been continuously renovated, upgraded and expanded to accommodate the growing support staff around the team. Notably, a temporary two-story building equipped with fitness/training facilities was constructed on the mount between the main building and Pitch 2 in June 2022, following special approval from Frederiksberg Municipality — in 2024 it was reduced to one floor due to limited permission, now covering approximately 240 square meters.
