= Daniel Haarbo =

Danish footballer (born 2003)

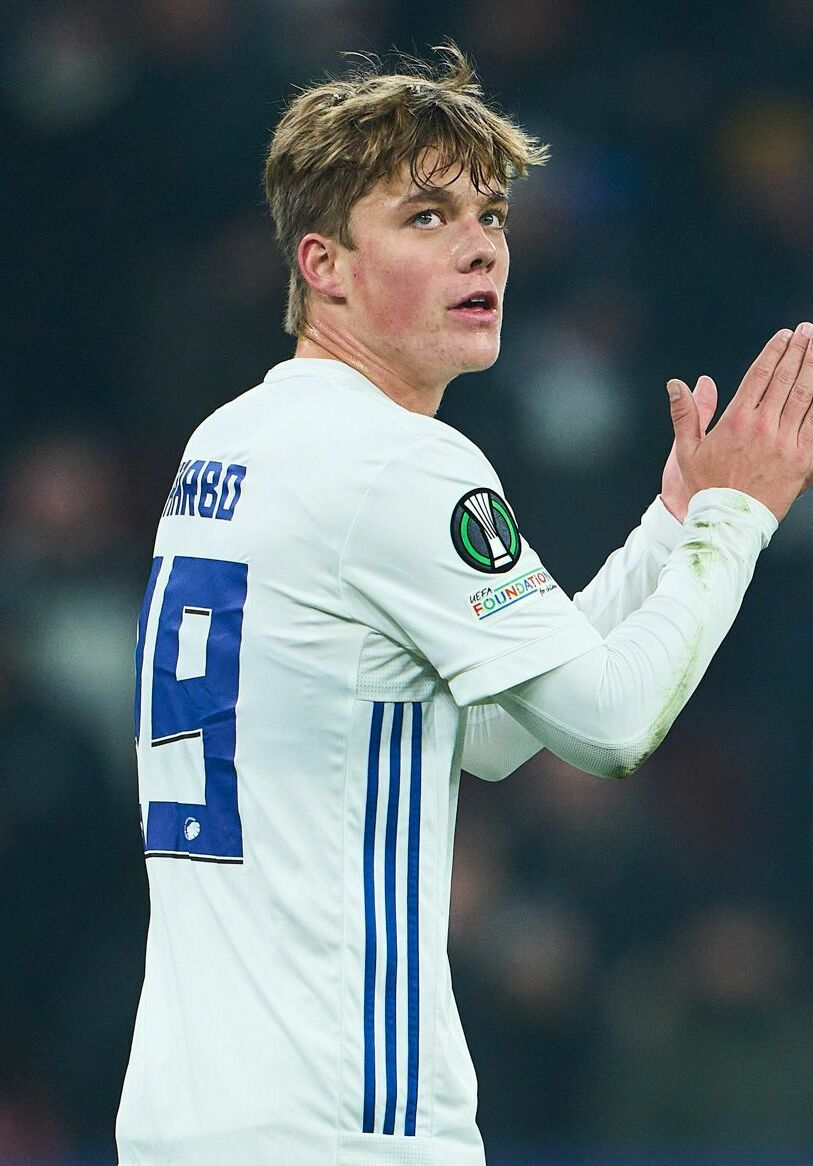
- Bisgaard Haarbo in 2022

Personal information
- Full name: Daniel Bisgaard Haarbo
- Date of birth: 14 March 2003 (age 23)
- Height: 1.82 m (6 ft 0 in)
- Position: Midfielder

Team information
- Current team: Fredericia
- Number: 20

Youth career
- 2008–2013: BSV
- 2013–2022: Copenhagen

Senior career*
Years	Team	Apps	(Gls)
2022–2024	Copenhagen	0	(0)
2022	→ Wil (loan)	0	(0)
2022	→ Wil II (loan)	1	(1)
2023	→ Helsingør (loan)	9	(1)
2023–2024	→ Aarhus Fremad (loan)	31	(1)
2024–	Fredericia	16	(2)

International career^{‡}
2020	Denmark U17	4	(0)
2020	Denmark U18	1	(0)
2021–2022	Denmark U19	10	(1)
- * Club domestic league appearances and goals as of 10 December 2025 ‡ National team caps and goals as of 11 May 2022

Daniel Bisgaard Haarbo (born 14 March 2003) is a Danish professional footballer who plays as a midfielder for Danish Superliga club Fredericia.

== Club career ==
=== BSV ===
Haarbo got interested in football playing for the local club BSV having highly motivating trainers.

In 2013 Haarbo was invited by AC Milan to join their global Milan Junior Camp.

=== F.C. Copenhagen Talent Academy ===
At the age of ten, Haarbo chose to move from BSV to F.C. Copenhagen (KB), and thereby following in the footsteps of his older brother.

In 2015, Haarbo was offered to join the F.C. Copenhagen "School of Excellence", a three-year talent-program combining school and football-education, with the older class of 2002.

In the 2019–20 season, Haarbo was captain for the F.C. Copenhagen U17-team, that under coach Alfred Johansson ended as no. 1 in the country-wide u17-league, but due to COVID-19 break-out no medals was rewarded.

Haarbo was promoted to the F.C. Copenhagen U19-team at the end of 2019 where he took part in winning the Danish U19 cup-final 2019/20.

In the 2021–22 season Haarbo was captain for the U19-team, that under coach Hjalte Bo Nørregaard won the "U19 Double" with both the league title and cup-title for the first time in the history of F.C. Copenhagen.

=== F.C. Copenhagen ===
In 2019 as U17-player young Haarbo was picked for the first time for a senior-match, but did not get his senior-debut until 2020 for the F.C. Copenhagen Reserves in a classic derby against Brøndby.

In 2021 Haarbo signed a full time professional contract with F.C. Copenhagen and shortly after he got his international senior-debut with F.C. Copenhagen in UEFA Europa Conference League winning against Lincoln Red Imps FC and winning a few days later in Parken (home turf) against SK Slovan Bratislava qualifying FC Copenhagen to the UEFA Europa Conference League 1/8th finals for the first time.

==== Loan to Wil ====
On 30 August 2022, Haarbo joined Wil in Swiss Challenge League on loan for the rest of the 2022–23 season. However, the stay at FC Wil 1900 did not go according to plan, as Haarbo had not played a single first-team match, and the cooperation therefore ended on 1 December 2022, the Swiss club confirmed.

==== Loan to Helsingør ====
On 31 January 2023, Haarbo was loaned out to Danish 1st Division side FC Helsingør until the end of the season. Haarbo made a total of 9 appearances for the 1st Division club.

==== Loan to Aarhus Fremad ====
On 19 July 2023, Haarbo signed a one-season loan deal with Danish 2nd Division club Aarhus Fremad.

=== Fredericia ===
On 25 May 2024, the Danish 1st Division club FC Fredericia confirmed that they had signed Haarbo on a deal until June 2027. In his first season he helped the club getting promoted to the Danish Superliga for the first time in club history existence.

== National team ==
Haarbo has played and won 4 matches for Denmark U17 national-team against Greece and France.

Haarbo was invited to join the U17 national team campaign in 2020 UEFA Europa Under-17 championship in Moscow (Russia), but the tournament was cancelled due to COVID-19.

Haarbo participated in the only U18 national-team gathering in 2020–21, where Germany was defeated away in Germany.

In 2021–22 the national-team program was back on full steam and Haarbo played all 10 matches, with seven victories, two draws and one defeat. A defeat, that was played under very special and extreme conditions in Spain, and which meant that the talented year-2003 national-team missed the qualification to 2022 UEFA Europa Under-19 championship and therefore also the FIFA Under-20 World Championship.
