= Peter Ankersen =

Danish footballer (born 1990)

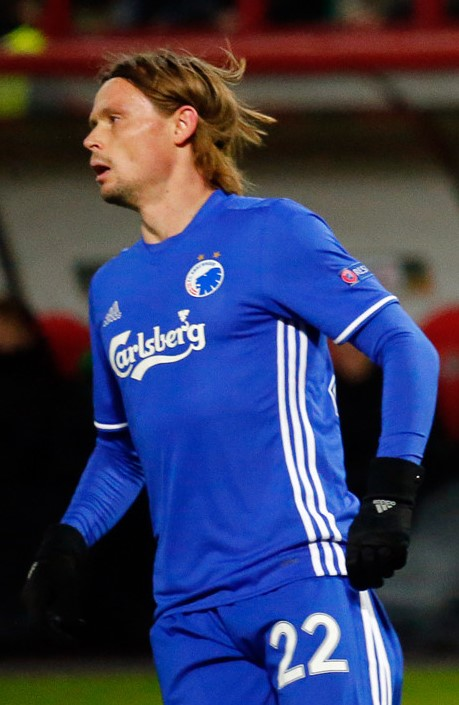
- Ankersen with F.C. Copenhagen in 2017

Personal information
- Full name: Peter Svarrer Ankersen
- Date of birth: 22 September 1990 (age 36)
- Place of birth: Esbjerg, Denmark
- Height: 1.80 m (5 ft 11 in)
- Position: Right-back

Team information
- Current team: Nordsjælland
- Number: 2

Youth career
- Esbjerg fB

Senior career*
Years	Team	Apps	(Gls)
2009–2010	Esbjerg fB	1	(0)
2010–2012	Vejle	46	(3)
2012	Rosenborg	10	(0)
2012–2014	Esbjerg fB	56	(5)
2014–2016	Red Bull Salzburg	21	(1)
2015–2016	→ Copenhagen (loan)	30	(0)
2016–2019	Copenhagen	96	(8)
2019–2020	Genoa	19	(0)
2020–2024	Copenhagen	82	(4)
2024–	Nordsjælland	67	(6)

International career^{‡}
2013–2019	Denmark	27	(1)
- * Club domestic league appearances and goals as of 20 September 2026 ‡ National team caps and goals as of 13:59, 22 June 2024 (UTC)

Peter Svarrer Ankersen (born 22 September 1990) is a Danish professional footballer who plays as a right-back for Danish Superliga club FC Nordsjælland.

== Club career ==
Getting his football education in the youth ranks of local team Esbjerg fB, he saw limited first team opportunities, and in the summer of 2010 he decided to join Vejle Boldklub in the Danish 1st Division.

After two successful seasons for Vejle, both of them in the Danish 1st division, bigger teams started to pay him attention. In March 2012 he was sold to Norwegian club Rosenborg BK.

He became a regular first team starter for the Norwegian side, but after only 18 games he had yet to settle personally. In the same summer he was sold back to his childhood club Esbjerg fB on a four-year contract.

During his second stay at Esbjerg, alongside twin brother Jakob Ankersen, played an integral part of the Esbjerg team that following promotion won the Danish Cup and finished 4th in the Danish Superliga.

During a 5–1 win over AGF Aarhus on 10 August 2013, Ankersen scored a sensational goal reminiscent of Marco van Basten's strike in the final of Euro 88. The goal was shortlisted for the 2013 FIFA Puskás Award.

In January 2014 he was signed by RB Salzburg after impressing against them in the group stages of the Europa league, and was praised for his ability to play on either defensive flank.

He joined F.C. Copenhagen in the summer of 2015 initially on loan, before signing permanently the season after. He was linked with a move to the Premier League club Newcastle United. Ankersen was nominated for the goal of the season by the Danish football federation in 2017.

On transfer deadline day, 2 September 2019, Ankersen joined Italian Serie A club Genoa on a contract until June 2021 with an option for a further year. He made 19 league appearances during his sole season with Genoa, where he was mostly used as a substitute.

On 26 September 2020, FC Copenhagen announced that they had signed Ankersen on a four-year contract. On 1 October 2020, Ankersen scored a highly bizarre own goal against Croatian club HNK Rijeka in the 2020-21 UEFA Europa League play-off round. The own goal proved to be decisive and FCK was eliminated. After four years in Copenhagen, it was confirmed on 31 March 2024 that Ankersen would be leaving the capital club at the end of the season.

On 1 June 2024 FC Nordsjælland confirmed that they had signed Ankersen on a free transfer, where Ankersen signed a contract until June 2026.

== International career ==
On 17 May 2013, Ankersen was called up for the Denmark national team for a friendly against Georgia. In the match, he remained an unused sub for the entire game.

On 14 August 2013, he made his international debut in a 3–2 loss to Poland, coming on as a substitute for Nicolai Boilesen at half-time.

Ankersen scored his first goal ever in Denmark national team colours on 11 November 2016 in a 2018 FIFA World Cup qualification match against Kazakhstan. Denmark won 4–1.

Ankersen was named in Denmark's preliminary 35-man squad for the 2018 World Cup in Russia in May 2018. However, he did not make the final 23.

== Personal life ==
He is the twin brother of professional footballer, Jakob Ankersen.

== Career statistics ==
=== Club ===
As of match played 20 September 2026

Appearances and goals by club, season and competition
Club	Season	League			National cup		Europe		Total	
Club	Season	Division	Apps	Goals	Apps	Goals	Apps	Goals	Apps	Goals
Esbjerg fB	2009–10	Danish Superliga	1	0	0	0	–		1	0
Vejle	2010–11	Danish 1st Division	28	1	0	0	–		28	1
Vejle	2011–12	Danish 1st Division	13	2	2	1	–		15	3
Vejle	Total		41	3	2	1	–		43	4
Rosenborg	2012	Tippeligaen	10	0	4	0	4 (Note: Appearances in UEFA Europa League)	1	18	1
Esbjerg fB	2012–13	Danish Superliga	26	3	6	0	–		32	3
Esbjerg fB	2013–14	Danish Superliga	30	2	0	0	8 (Note: Appearances in UEFA Europa League)	2	38	4
Esbjerg fB	Total		56	5	6	0	8	2	70	7
Red Bull Salzburg	2014–15	Austrian Bundesliga	21	1	4	0	8 (Note: 3 appearances in UEFA Champions League, 5 appearances in UEFA Europa League)	0	33	1
Copenhagen	2015–16	Danish Superliga	30	0	3	0	4 (Note: Appearances in UEFA Europa League)	0	37	0
Copenhagen	2016–17	Danish Superliga	24	2	2	0	15 (Note: Appearances in UEFA Champions League)	0	41	2
Copenhagen	2017–18	Danish Superliga	30	2	2	0	10 (Note: 2 appearances in UEFA Champions League, 8 appearances in UEFA Europa League)	0	34	2
Copenhagen	2018–19	Danish Superliga	34	1	1	0	6 (Note: Appearances in UEFA Europa League)	0	41	1
Copenhagen	Total		118	5	8	0	27	0	153	5
Genoa	2019–20	Serie A	19	0	0	0	–		19	0
Copenhagen	2020-21	Danish Superliga	22	2	1	0	1 (Note: Appearances in UEFA Europa League)	0	24	2
Copenhagen	2021–22	Danish Superliga	28	1	1	0	10 (Note: Appearances in UEFA Conference League)	1	39	2
Copenhagen	2022–23	Danish Superliga	12	0	2	0	2	0	16	0
Copenhagen	2023–24	Danish Superliga	21	1	4	0	8	0	33	1
Copenhagen	Total		83	4	8	0	21	1	111	5
Nordsjælland	2024–25	Danish Superliga	29	3	2	1	—		31	4
Nordsjælland	2025–26	Danish Superliga	30	3	3	1	—		33	4
Nordsjælland	2026–27	Danish Superliga	8	0	0	0	6	0	14	0
Nordsjælland	Total		67	6	5	2	6	0	78	8
Career total			416	24	38	3	74	4	526	31

=== International ===
As of match played 15 October 2019

Appearances and goals by national team and year
National team	Year	Apps	Goals
Denmark	2013	4	0
Denmark	2014	6	0
Denmark	2016	8	1
Denmark	2017	3	0
Denmark	2018	2	0
Denmark	2019	4	0
Total		27	1

Scores and results list Denmark's goal tally first, score column indicates score after each Ankersen goal.

List of international goals scored by Peter Ankersen
No.	Date	Venue	Opponent	Score	Result	Competition	Ref.
1	11 November 2016	Parken Stadium, Copenhagen, Denmark	Kazakhstan	3–1	4–1	2018 FIFA World Cup qualification	

== Honours ==
Esbjerg

- Danish Cup: 2012–13

Salzburg

- Austrian Football Bundesliga: 2014–15
- Austrian Cup: 2014–15

Copenhagen

- Danish Superliga: 2015–16, 2016–17, 2018–19, 2021–22
- Danish Cup: 2015–16, 2016–17
