= 2020–21 F.C. Copenhagen season =

F.C. Copenhagen
2020–21 season
- Chairman: Bo Rygaard
- Head coach: Jess Thorup
- Stadium: Telia Parken
- Danish Superliga: 3rd
- Danish Cup: Fourth round
- UEFA Europa League: Play-off round
- Top goalscorer: League: Jonas Wind (15); All: Jonas Wind (17)
- Biggest win: 3–0 (20 September 2020 vs. Piast Gliwice, UEFA Europa League)
- Biggest defeat: 0–4 (11 November 2020 vs. FC Midtjylland)
Home colours	Away colours	Third colours

The 2020–21 F.C. Copenhagen season was the club's 29th season in existence and the 29th consecutive season in the top flight of Danish football. In addition to the domestic league, Copenhagen participated in this season's editions of the Danish Cup, the 2020 Danish Super Cup, and the UEFA Europa League. The season covered the period from August 2020 to 30 June 2021.

== Players ==
=== First-team squad ===
As of 24 May 2021

No.	Player	Nationality	Position	Since	Date of birth	Signed from
Goalkeepers
1	Stephan Andersen	(Denmark)	GK	2014	26 November 1981	(Spain) Real Betis
13	Sten Grytebust	(Norway)	GK	2019	25 October 1989	(Denmark) Odense
21	Karl-Johan Johnsson	(Sweden)	GK	2019	28 January 1990	(France) Guingamp
Defenders
4	Victor Nelsson	(Denmark)	CB	2019	14 October 1998	(Denmark) Nordsjælland
5	Andreas Bjelland (vice-captain)	(Denmark)	CB	2018	11 July 1988	(England) Brentford
17	Karlo Bartolec	(Croatia)	RB	2019	20 April 1995	(Denmark) Nordsjælland
19	Bryan Oviedo	(Costa Rica)	LB	2019	18 February 1990	(England) Sunderland
20	Nicolai Boilesen	(Denmark)	CB	2016	16 February 1992	(Netherlands) Ajax
22	Peter Ankersen	(Denmark)	RB	2020	22 September 1990	(Italy) Genoa
25	Zanka	(Denmark) (The Gambia)	CB	2020	23 April 1990	(Turkey) Fenerbahçe
26	Marios Oikonomou	(Greece)	CB	2020	6 October 1992	(Greece) AEK Athens
Midfielders
6	Jens Stage	(Denmark)	CM	2019	8 November 1996	(Denmark) Aarhus
7	Viktor Fischer (3rd captain)	(Denmark)	LM	2018	9 June 1994	(Germany) Mainz
8	Nicolaj Thomsen	(Denmark)	LM	2017	8 May 1993	(France) Nantes
10	Zeca (captain)	(Greece) (Portugal)	CM	2017	31 Aug 1988	(Greece) Panathinaikos
11	Mohamed Daramy	(Denmark)	RM	2015	7 January 2002	(Denmark) Homegrown
12	Lukas Lerager	(Denmark)	RM	2021	12 July 1993	(Italy) Genoa C.F.C.
16	Pep Biel	(Spain)	RM	2019	5 September 1996	(Spain) Real Zaragoza
33	Rasmus Falk	(Denmark)	CM	2016	15 January 1992	(Denmark) Odense
Forwards
9	Kamil Wilczek	(Poland)	FW	2020	14 January 1988	(Turkey) Göztepe
23	Jonas Wind	(Denmark)	FW	2016	7 February 1999	(Denmark) Homegrown
28	Mustapha Bundu	(Sierra Leone)	FW	2021	3 January 2001	(Belgium) RSC Anderlecht
29	Mikkel Kaufmann	(Denmark)	FW	2020	3 January 2001	(Denmark) Aalborg

=== Out on loan ===
Note: Flags indicate national team as defined under FIFA eligibility rules; some limited exceptions apply. Players may hold more than one non-FIFA nationality.

No.	Pos.	Nation	Player
—	DF	URU	Guillermo Varela (at (Russia) Dynamo Moscow until 30 June 2021)
—	MF	CRO	Robert Mudražija (at (Croatia) HNK Rijeka until 30 June 2022)

No.	Pos.	Nation	Player
—	DF	SWE	Pierre Bengtsson (at (Denmark) Vejle BK until 30 June 2021)

== Non-competitive ==
=== Pre-season ===
30 August 2020	Copenhagen	1–3	Silkeborg	Copenhagen
13:00	Falk 53'	Report	Crone 47', 51'; Pedersen 69'	Stadium: Telia Parken; Attendance: 0 Referee: Jesper Nielsen

7 September 2020	Lyngby	2–2	Copenhagen	Slagelse
11:00	Riel 25' (Gytkjær); Gytkjær 43' (Jakobsen)	Report	Wilczek 53' (Varela); Kaufmann 57' (Fischer)	Stadium: Harboe Arena Slagelse; Attendance: 0 Referee: Benjamin Willaume-Jantzen

=== Mid-season ===
15 January 2021	Copenhagen	2–2	Hvidovre	Frederiksberg
11:00 CEST	Wilczek 15'; Thomsen 72'	FCK Summary	Thomsen 6'; Lindberg 65'	Stadium: Nummer 10; Attendance: 0 (Stadium closed to the public); Referee: Jakob Sundberg

20 January 2021	Copenhagen	3–2	Helsingør	Frederiksberg
13:00 CEST	Wilczek 26'; Fischer 46'; Stage 57'	FCK Summary	Holst 2'; Carl Lange 67'	Stadium: Nummer 10; Attendance: 0 (Stadium closed to the public); Referee: Benjamin Willaume-Jantzen

27 January 2021	Copenhagen	6–1	Aarhus	Frederiksberg
13:00 CEST	Fischer 25'; Wind 57'; Bøving 95', 121'; Stamenic 109'; Haraldsson 129'	FCK Summary	Links 55'	Stadium: Nummer 10; Attendance: 0 (Stadium closed to the public); Referee: Benjamin Helm Svedborg

== Competitions ==
=== Competition record ===
Competition	Record							
Competition	G	W	D	L	GF	GA	GD	Win %
Superliga	32	16	7	9	61	53	+8	50.00
Danish Cup	2	1	1	0	3	2	+1	50.00
Europa League	3	2	0	1	5	2	+3	66.67
Total	37	19	8	10	69	57	+12	51.35

Last updated: 24 May 2021.
Source: Competitive matches

=== Superliga ===
==== Regular season ====
Pos	Team	Pld	W	D	L	GF	GA	GD	Pts	Qualification
2	Midtjylland	22	13	4	5	35	20	+15	43	Qualification for the Championship round
3	AGF	22	10	8	4	35	22	+13	38	Qualification for the Championship round
4	Copenhagen	22	10	5	7	39	35	+4	35	Qualification for the Championship round
5	Randers	22	9	5	8	31	21	+10	32	Qualification for the Championship round
6	Nordsjælland	22	7	8	7	35	30	+5	29	Qualification for the Championship round

Source: Danish Football Association (in Danish), Soccerway
Rules for classification: 1) Points; 2) Goal difference; 3) Goals scored; 4) Away goals scored; 5) Play-off (played on neutral ground if determining teams for different rounds); 6) Draw.

==== Results by round - Regular season ====
Matchday	1	2	3	4	5	6	7	8	9	10	11	12	13	14	15	16	17	18	19	20	21	22
Ground	A	H	A	H	H	A	H	A	H	A	H	A	H	A	A	H	A	H	H	A	H	A
Result	L	L	D	W	L	W	W	L	L	W	W	W	D	W	W	W	D	D	W	L	D	L
Position	8	11	10	9	9	9	8	9	9	9	7	6	6	6	4	4	4	4	3	4	4	4

Updated to match(es) played on 21 March 2021. Source: http://www.superliga.dk/
A = Away; H = Home; W = Win; D = Draw; L = Loss

==== Championship round ====
Pos	Team	Pld	W	D	L	GF	GA	GD	Pts	Qualification	BRO	MID	COP	AGF	NOR	RAN
1	Brøndby (C)	32	19	4	9	58	38	+20	61	Qualification for the Champions League play-off round	—	3–1	1–3	2–2	2–0	2–0
2	Midtjylland	32	18	6	8	57	33	+24	60	Qualification for the Champions League second qualifying round	1–0	—	4–1	4–0	3–0	1–1
3	Copenhagen	32	16	7	9	61	53	+8	55	Qualification for the Europa Conference League second qualifying round	2–1	4–2	—	3–2	2–2	2–1
4	AGF (O)	32	13	9	10	48	42	+6	48	Qualification for the European play-off match	1–2	1–4	1–2	—	3–1	2–0
5	Nordsjælland	32	11	10	11	51	51	0	43		0–3	3–2	2–2	2–0	—	2–1

Source: Danish Football Association (in Danish), Soccerway
Legend: Blue = home team win; Yellow = draw; Red = away team win.
Rules for classification: 1) Points; 2) Goal difference; 3) Goals scored; 4) Away goals scored; 5) Play-off (played on neutral ground if determining teams for different rounds); 6) Draw.
(C) Champions; (O) Play-off winners

==== Results by round - Championship round ====
Matchday	1	2	3	4	5	6	7	8	9	10
Ground	H	A	H	A	A	H	A	H	H	A
Result	W	W	D	L	W	W	D	W	W	L
Position	4	3	3	4	3	3	3	3	3	3

Updated to match(es) played on 24 May 2021. Source: http://www.superliga.dk/
A = Away; H = Home; W = Win; D = Draw; L = Loss

==== Regular season ====
13 September 2020 1	Odense	3–2	Copenhagen	Odense
18:00 CEST	Thomasen 10'; Jebali 17' 45'; Sabbi (yellow card) 51'	Report	Wilczek 61' 70' (yellow card) 78'; Kaufmann (yellow card) 62'	Stadium: Nature Energy Park; Attendance: 4,315; Referee: Jakob Kehlet

20 September 2020 2	Copenhagen	1–2	Brøndby	Copenhagen
14:00 CEST	Wilczek 12' (yellow card) 44'; Nelsson (yellow card) 90+2'	Report	Lindstrøm 31' (yellow card) 65'; Bruus (yellow card) 57'; Uhre 90+3'	Stadium: Telia Parken; Attendance: 277; Referee: Jørgen Daugbjerg Burchardt

27 September 2020 3	Vejle	2–2	Copenhagen	Vejle
18:00 CEST	Sousa 62' (Faghir) (yellow card) 65'; Dwamena (yellow card) 78' (goal) 90+2' (Sousa)	Report	Ankersen 5'; Zeca (yellow card) 51'; Wilczek 61'; Biel (yellow card) 71'	Stadium: Vejle Stadium; Attendance: 350; Referee: Mads Kristoffer-Kristoffersen

4 October 2020 4	Copenhagen	3–2	Nordsjælland	Copenhagen
20:00 CEST	Boilsen 6'; Wind 30' 60' (pen.); Zeca (yellow card) 77'; Oviedo (yellow card) 90+6'	Report	Diomande 17'; Frese 48' (Thycosen); Rygaard (yellow card) 75'	Stadium: Telia Parken; Attendance: 220; Referee: Morten Krogh

18 October 2020 5	Copenhagen	1–2	Aalborg	Copenhagen
18:00 CEST	Falk 90+3'	Report	Fossum 35' 44'; Hiljemark (yellow card) 86'	Stadium: Telia Parken; Attendance: 242; Referee: Jakob Kehlet

25 October 2020 6	Aarhus	0–1	Copenhagen	Aarhus
18:00 CEST	Poulsen (yellow card) 11' (yellow-red card) 61'; Hvidt (yellow card) 14'; Grabara (yellow card) 61'; Mortensen (yellow card) 62'; Links (yellow card) 90+4'	Report	Wind 9' (pen.); Zanka (yellow card) 12'; Kaufmann (yellow card) 28' (yellow-red card) 77'; Zeca (yellow card) 34'; Daramy (yellow card) 72'; Johnsson (yellow card) 90+3'	Stadium: Ceres Park; Attendance: 300; Referee: Mads-Kristoffer Kristoffersen

1 November 2020 7	Copenhagen	4–2	Lyngby	Copenhagen
16:00 CET	Wind 42' 56'; Hebo 44' (o.g.); Zanka (yellow card) 49'; Wilczek 60'; Zeca (yellow card) 69' (yellow-red card) 72'	Report	Hebo (yellow card) 46'; Fosgaard 50'; Torp 54'; Gammelby (yellow card) 90+4'	Stadium: Telia Parken; Attendance: 247; Referee: Sandi Putros

8 November 2020 8	Midtjylland	4–0	Copenhagen	Herning
18:00 CET	Kaba 36'; Evander 41'; Sisto 48' 68'; Paulinho (yellow card) 64'	Report	Falk (yellow card) 15'; Fischer (yellow card) 26' (yellow-red card) 50'; Nelsson (yellow card) 90+2'	Stadium: MCH Arena; Attendance: 258; Referee: Mads-Kristoffer Kristoffersen

23 November 2020 9	Copenhagen	1–2	Randers	Copenhagen
19:00 CET	Nelsson (yellow card) 26'; Kaufmann (yellow card) 39' (goal) 54'; Stamenic (yellow card) 66'	Report	Egho 40'; Kamara 70'; Kallesøe (yellow card) 90'	Stadium: Telia Parken; Attendance: 246; Referee: Jørgen Daugbjerg Burchardt

29 November 2020 10	SønderjyskE	1–3	Copenhagen	Haderslev
16:00 CET	Daramy 3'; Zeca 34'; Oviedo (yellow card) 76'; Falk 81'	Report	Bah 73'	Stadium: Sydbank Park; Attendance: 300; Referee: Morten Krogh

6 December 2020 11	Copenhagen	2–0	Horsens	Copenhagen
16:00 CET	Oviedo (yellow card) 2'; Zeca 34'; Falk 27'	Report	Hansson (yellow card) 20'	Stadium: Telia Parken; Attendance: 226; Referee: Mikkel Redder

13 December 2020 12	Nordsjælland	0–1	Copenhagen	Farum
16:00 CET	Jenssen (yellow card) 48'; Sadiq (yellow card) 90+4'	Report	Zeca (yellow card) 57'; Falk (yellow card) 62'; Biel 81'	Stadium: Right to Dream Park; Attendance: 300; Referee: Jakob A. Sundberg

20 December 2020 13	Copenhagen	1–1	Odense	Copenhagen
18:00 CET	Biel 27' (Kaufmann); Zanka (yellow card) 85'	Report	Kløve 63'; Lund (yellow card) 70'; Lieder (yellow card) 90'	Stadium: Telia Parken; Attendance: 250; Referee: Jens Maae

3 February 2021 14	Aalborg	2–3	Copenhagen	Aalborg
20:00 CET	Thelander 10' (Fossum); Hannesbo 39' van Weert (yellow card) 59'	Report	Bartolec 53'; Stage 58' (Wind); Nelson (yellow card) 64'; Falk 79' (Wind)	Stadium: Aalborg Portland Park; Attendance: 0 Referee: Mads-Kristoffer Kristoffersen

7 February 2021 15	Horsens	0–2	Copenhagen	Horsens
16:00 CET	Ludwig (yellow card) 40'; Hansson (yellow card) 43'	Report	Fischer 5'; Wind 23' (Bundu); Bjelland (yellow card) 84'	Stadium: CASA Arena Horsens; Attendance: 0 Referee: Jørgen Daugbjerg Burchardt

15 February 2021 16	Copenhagen	3–2	SønderjyskE	Copenhagen
19:00 CET	Fischer 38' (Wind); Wind 48' (pen.) 48' (pen.); Stage (yellow card) 57'; Jørgensen (yellow card) 82'; Boilsen (yellow card) 87'; Bartolec (yellow card) 90+5'	Report	Ekani (yellow card) 35' (yellow-red card) 47'; Albæk (yellow card) 40' (goal) 45+1'; Banggaard (yellow card) 80'; Dal Hende 83' (pen.)	Stadium: Telia Parken; Attendance: 0 Referee: Sandi Putros

22 February 2021 17	Lyngby	2–2	Copenhagen	Lyngby
19:00 CET	Hebo (yellow card) 21' (goal) 58' (Kornvig) 70' (Warming); Kornvig (yellow card) 27'; Mikkelsen (yellow card) 82'; Jakobsen (yellow card) 83'	Report	Wind 41' (pen.); Zeca (yellow card) 51'; Lerager 69'	Stadium: Lyngby Stadium; Attendance: 0 Referee: Martin Krogh

28 February 2021 18	Copenhagen	3–3	Aarhus	Copenhagen
16:00 CET	Wind 15' (Falk); Daramy; Lerager (yellow card) 76'; Boilesen (yellow card) 83'; Falk 90+11' (pen.); Jørgensen (yellow card) 90+6'	Report	Mortensen 21' (Sanneh) 27'; Olsen 29' (Grønbæk); Poulsen (yellow card) 77'; Sanneh (yellow card) 85'	Stadium: Telia Parken; Attendance: 0 Referee: Jørgen Daugbjerg Burchardt

3 March 2021 19	Copenhagen	2–1	Vejle	Copenhagen
20:00 CET	Jørgensen 28' (Fischer); Daramy 86' (Stage)	Report	Ezatolahi (yellow card) 36'; Kolinger (yellow card) 51'; Ramadani 67' (Ojala)	Stadium: Telia Parken; Attendance: 0 Referee: Michael Tykgaard

7 March 2021 20	Brøndby	2–1	Copenhagen	Copenhagen
14:00 CET	Vigen 70'; Bruus (yellow card) 80'; Maxsø 90+1' (pen.)	Report	Jørgensen (yellow card) 83'; Stage (yellow card) 89' (goal) 90+3'; Bundu (yellow card) 90+5'	Stadium: Brøndby Stadium; Attendance: 0 Referee: Jakob Kehlet

14 March 2021 21	Copenhagen	0–0	Midtjylland	Copenhagen
18:00 CET	Lerager (yellow card) 44'; Wind (yellow card) 53'; Bartolec (yellow card) 57'	Report	Scholz (yellow card) 5'; Sviatchenko (yellow card) 52'; Ailton (yellow card) 88'; Onyeka (yellow card) 90+1'	Stadium: Telia Parken; Attendance: 0 Referee: Mads-Kristoffer Kristoffersen

21 March 2021 22	Randers	2–1	Copenhagen	Randers
17:00 CET	Johnsen 38' (Mileusnic); Greve 81'; Lauridsen (yellow card) 90+1'	Report	Lerager 41' (Daramy); Daramy (yellow card) 45'; Wind (yellow card) 86'	Stadium: Cepheus Park Randers; Attendance: 0 Referee: Jens Maae

==== Championship round ====
5 April 2021 23	Copenhagen	2–1	Randers	Copenhagen
16:00 CET	Wilczek 10' (Wind); Fischer 18' (Falk)	FCK Summary	Egho 7' (Marxen) Kopplin (yellow card) 25'	Stadium: Telia Parken; Attendance: 0 Referee: Morten Krogh

11 April 2021 24	Brøndby	1–3	Copenhagen	Brøndbyvester
16:00 CET	Frendrup (yellow card) 2'; Uhre 69'; Rosted (yellow card) 90+5'	FCK Summary	Wilczek 37' (Kristiansen) 90+6' (Stage); Daramy 90+1'	Stadium: Brøndby Stadium; Attendance: 0 Referee: Michael Tykgaard

18 April 2021 25	Copenhagen	2–2	Nordsjælland	Copenhagen
16:00 CET	Lerager 10' (yellow card) 24'; Boilesen (red card); Ankersen 60' (Wind) (yellow card) 74'	FCK Summary	Sulamana 45' (Villadsen) (yellow card) 77'; Kofod Andersen (yellow card) 50'; Thychosen (yellow card) 58'; Adingra 90' (Antman)	Stadium: Telia Parken; Attendance: 0 Referee: Mads-Kristoffer Kristoffersen

22 April 2021 26	Midtjylland	4–1	Copenhagen	Herning
21:00 CEST	Cajuste (yellow card) 22'; Brumado 25' (Evander); Onyeka (yellow card) 38'; Dreyer 49' (Evander); Sisto 56' (Evander); Vibe 81'; Høegh (yellow card) 90'	FCK Summary	Wind (yellow card) 37'; Daramy (yellow card) 45'; Bundu 71' (Kristiansen)	Stadium: MCH Arena; Attendance: 4,450; Referee: Jørgen Daugbjerg Burchardt

25 April 2021 27	AGF	1–2	Copenhagen	Aarhus
20:00 CEST	Højer 31'; Hvidt (yellow card) 90+3'; Hausner (yellow card) 90+5'; Grabara (yellow card) 90+5'	FCK Summary	Wind 26' (Stage); Ankersen (yellow card) 29'; Lerager (yellow card) 39'; Stage 38' (Fischer); Zeca (yellow card) 85'; Nelsson (yellow card) 90+5'	Stadium: Aarhus Stadium; Attendance: 8,500; Referee: Morten Krogh

3 May 2021 28	Copenhagen	3–2	AGF	Copenhagen
19:00 CEST	Wilczek 7' (Fischer); Nelsson 17' (yellow card) 68'; Wind 33' (pen.); Zanka (yellow card) 39'; Kristiansen (yellow card) 90'; Stage (yellow card) 90+4'	FCK Summary	Juelsgård (yellow card) 19'; Þorsteinsson (yellow card) 37'; Diks 57' (Højer) 67' (Hausner); Poulsen (yellow card) 61'	Stadium: Telia Parken; Attendance: 10,365; Referee: Peter Kjærsgaard

10 May 2021 29	Nordsjælland	2–2	Copenhagen	Farum
19:00 CEST	Sulemana 49' (Christensen); Christensen (yellow card) 58'; Frese 68' (Villadsen)	FCK Summary	Zanka (yellow card) 23'; Ankersen (yellow card) 33'; Stage 51' (Wind) 71' (Falk); Boilsen (yellow card) 56'	Stadium: Right to Dream Park; Attendance: 2,103; Referee: Sandi Putros

16 May 2021 30	Copenhagen	2–1	Brøndby	Copenhagen
16:00 CEST	Maxsø 27' (o.g.); Wind 55' (pen.); Daramy (yellow card) 87'; Zeca (yellow card) 90+1'	FCK Summary	Hermannsson (yellow card) 6'; Hedlund 39' (Mensah); Bruus (yellow card) 45+2'; Lindstrøm (red card) 68'; Jung (yellow card) 78'; Schwäbe (yellow card) 87'Corlu (yellow card) 90'	Stadium: Telia Parken; Attendance: 11,086; Referee: Mads-Kristoffer Kristoffersen

19 May 2021 31	Copenhagen	4–2	Midtjylland	Copenhagen
21:00 CEST	Lerager 30' (Wind); Zeca (yellow card) 40'; Wilczek 44'; Wind 76' (pen.); Daramy 87' (Fischer); Falk (yellow card) 90'	FCK Summary	Kaba 34' (Evander); Scholz 40' (pen.); Brumado (yellow card) 72'; Cools (red card) 75'; Anderson (yellow card) 90+5'	Stadium: Telia Parken; Attendance: 10,927; Referee: Jørgen Daugbjerg Burchardt

24 May 2021 32	Randers	2–1	Copenhagen	Randers
17:00 CEST	Greve 50'; Egho 58' (pen.)	FCK Summary	Nelsson (red card) 56'; Zanka (yellow card) 81'; Fischer 90+3'	Stadium: Cepheus Park Randers; Attendance: 3,756; Referee: Michael Tykgaard

=== Danish Cup ===
4 November 2020 Third round	Avarta	1–2	Copenhagen	Copenhagen
16:45 CET	Walter 5'	Report	Fischer 41' 60'; Oikonomou (yellow card) 32'; Wilczek (yellow card) 90+3'	Stadium: Telia Parken; Attendance: 203; Referee: Jonas Hansen

17 December 2020 Fourth round	Copenhagen	1–1 (a.e.t.) (5−6 p)	Midtjylland	Copenhagen
20:15 CET	Johnsson (yellow card) 1'; Stage (yellow card) 5', (goal) 9'; Zeca (yellow card) 104'	FCK Summary	Kaba 3' (pen.); Cajuste (yellow card) 13'; Onyeka (yellow card) 48'; Sviatchenko (yellow card) 83'; Cools (yellow card) 89'	Stadium: Telia Parken; Attendance: 266; Referee: Jørgen Daugbjerg Burchardt
	Penalties
	Wilczek (penalty scored); Pep Biel (penalty scored); Ankersen (penalty scored); Boilesen (penalty scored); Oviedo (penalty scored); Thomsen (penalty missed)		(penalty scored) Mabil; (penalty scored) Dreyer; (penalty scored) Andersson; (penalty scored) Sviatchenko; (penalty scored) Evander; (penalty scored) Paulinho

=== UEFA Europa League ===
17 September 2020 Second qualifying round	Göteborg (Sweden)	1–2	(Denmark) Copenhagen	Gothenburg
18:00 CEST	Kalley (yellow card) 2'; Wernbloom (yellow card) 62'; Sana 73'	Report	Zeca (yellow card) 40'; Falk (yellow card) 68'; Mudražija 82'; Wind 85'	Stadium: Ullevi; Attendance: 0 Referee: (Spain) Guillermo Cuadra Fernández

24 September 2020 Third qualifying round	Copenhagen (Denmark)	3–0	(Poland) Piast Gliwice	Copenhagen
20:00 CEST	Wilczek 14'; Wind 58'; Mudražija (yellow card) 85'; Biel 90+5'	Report	Czerwiński (yellow card) 56'; Lipski (yellow card) 66'; Kirkeskov (yellow card) 90+6'	Stadium: Telia Parken; Attendance: 0 Referee: (Israel) Roi Reinshreiber

1 October 2020 Play-off round	Copenhagen (Denmark)	0–1	(Croatia) Rijeka	Copenhagen
20:00 CEST	Nelsson (yellow card) 30'; Ankersen (yellow card) 59'; Sigurðsson (yellow card) 62'; Zeca (yellow card) 90+2'		Ankersen 20' (o.g.); Capan (yellow card) 22'; Kulenović (yellow card) 62'; Gnezda Čerin (yellow card) 79'; Raspopović (yellow card) 90+4'	Stadium: Telia Parken; Attendance: 0 Referee: (England) Chris Kavanagh

== Statistics ==
=== Appearances ===
As of 24 May 2021

This includes all competitive matches and refers to all squad members playing throughout the season, regardless of their current roster status.

Rank	Pos	No.	Player	Superliga	Danish Cup	Europa League	Total
1	MF	10	(Greece) Zeca	27	2	3	33
2	MF	33	(Denmark) Rasmus Falk	27	2	2	32
2	FW	9	(Poland) Kamil Wilczek	27	2	3	32
2	FW	23	(Denmark) Jonas Wind	28	1	3	32
5	MF	7	(Denmark) Viktor Fischer	27	1	3	31
5	MF	16	(Spain) Pep Biel	28	1	2	31
7	DF	4	(Denmark) Victor Nelsson	27	0	3	30
8	FW	11	(Denmark) Mohamed Daramy	28	1	0	29
9	DF	25	(Denmark) Zanka	26	2	0	28
10	MF	6	(Denmark) Jens Stage	21	2	3	27
10	GK	21	(Sweden) Karl-Johan Johnsson	24	1	3	27
10	DF	20	(Denmark) Nicolai Boilesen	26	1	0	27
13	DF	22	(Denmark) Peter Ankersen	21	1	1	23
14	DF	17	(Croatia) Karlo Bartolec	17	1	1	19
15	FW	29	(Denmark) Mikkel Kaufmann	14	1	2	17
15	MF	12	(Denmark) Lukas Lerager	17	0	0	17
17	MF	34	(Denmark) Victor Kristiansen	15	1	0	16
18	FW	28	(Sierra Leone) Mustapha Bundu	14	0	0	14
19	MF	24	(Croatia) Robert Mudražija	8	2	3	13
20	DF	3	(Sweden) Pierre Bengtsson	8	1	3	12
21	MF	26	(Greece) Marios Oikonomou	8	2	1	11
22	GK	13	(Norway) Sten Grytebust	9	1	0	10
23	DF	19	(Costa Rica) Bryan Oviedo	6	1	0	7
23	MF	8	(Denmark) Nicolaj Thomsen	6	1	0	7
25	FW	45	(Denmark) Rasmus Højlund	4	1	0	5
26	DF	27	(Iceland) Ragnar Sigurðsson	2	0	2	4
26	DF	5	(Denmark) Andreas Bjelland	3	0	1	4
28	DF	2	(Uruguay) Guillermo Varela	1	0	2	3
29	MF	26	(Denmark) Alexander Hjælmhof	0	1	0	1
29	MF	35	(New Zealand) Marko Stamenic	1	0	0	1
29	FW	42	(Denmark) William Bøving	1	0	0	1

=== Goalscorers ===
As of 24 May 2021

This includes all competitive matches.

Rnk	Pos	No.	Player	Superliga	Danish Cup	Europa League	Total
1	FW	23	(Denmark) Jonas Wind	15	0	2	17
2	FW	9	(Poland) Kamil Wilczek	10	0	1	11
3	MF	6	(Denmark) Jens Stage	5	1	0	6
3	MF	7	(Denmark) Viktor Fischer	4	2	0	6
5	FW	11	(Denmark) Mohamed Daramy	5	0	0	5
6	MF	33	(Denmark) Rasmus Falk	4	0	0	4
6	MF	12	(Denmark) Lukas Lerager	4	0	0	4
8	MF	16	(Spain) Pep Biel	2	0	1	3
9	MF	10	(Greece) (Portugal) Zeca	2	0	0	2
9	FW	22	(Denmark) Peter Ankersen	2	0	0	2
11	MF	24	(Croatia) Robert Mudražija	0	0	1	1
11	DF	20	(Denmark) Nicolai Boilesen	1	0	0	1
11	FW	29	(Denmark) Mikkel Kaufmann	1	0	0	1
11	DF	20	(Croatia) Karlo Bartolec	1	0	0	1
11	DF	25	(Denmark) Zanka	1	0	0	1
11	FW	28	(Sierra Leone) Mustapha Bundu	1	0	0	11
11	DF	4	(Denmark) Victor Nelsson	1	0	0	1
	O.G.		Opponent Own goal	2	0	0	2
TOTALS				61	3	5	69

=== Assists ===
As of 24 May 2021

This includes all competitive matches.

Rnk	Pos	No.	Player	Superliga	Danish Cup	Europa League	Total
1	FW	23	(Denmark) Jonas Wind	8	1	0	9
2	MF	33	(Denmark) Rasmus Falk	5	1	0	6
2	MF	7	(Denmark) Viktor Fischer	6	0	0	6
4	MF	16	(Spain) Pep Biel	1	0	2	3
4	MF	6	(Denmark) Jens Stage	3	0	0	3
6	DF	3	(Denmark) Pierre Bengtsson	2	0	0	2
6	FW	9	(Poland) Kamil Wilczek	1	0	1	2
6	DF	19	(Costa Rica) Bryan Oviedo	2	0	0	2
6	MF	10	(Greece) (Portugal) Zeca	1	0	1	2
6	MF	11	(Denmark) Mohamed Daramy	2	0	0	2
6	MF	34	(Denmark) Victor Kristiansen	2	0	0	2
12	MF	24	(Croatia) Robert Mudražija	0	0	1	1
12	DF	17	(Croatia) Karlo Bartolec	0	0	1	1
12	DF	20	(Denmark) Nicolai Boilesen	1	0	0	1
12	FW	29	(Denmark) Mikkel Kaufmann	1	0	0	1
12	FW	28	(Sierra Leone) Mustapha Bundu	1	0	0	1
TOTALS				37	2	5	44

=== Clean sheets ===
As of 24 May 2021

This includes all competitive matches.

Rnk	Pos	No.	Player	Superliga	Danish Cup	Europa League	Total
1	GK	21	(Sweden) Karl-Johan Johnsson	5	0	1	6
TOTALS				5	0	1	6

=== Disciplinary record ===
As of 24 May 2021

This includes all competitive matches.

Rnk	Pos.	No.	Player	Superliga		Danish Cup		Europa League		Total	
Rnk	Pos.	No.	Player	Yellow card	Red card	Yellow card	Red card	Yellow card	Red card	Yellow card	Red card
1	MF	10	(Greece) (Portugal) Zeca	10	1	1	0	2	0	13	1
2	DF	4	(Denmark) Victor Nelsson	6	1	0	0	1	0	7	1
2	DF	25	(Denmark) Zanka	8	0	0	0	0	0	8	0
4	MF	29	(Denmark) Mikkel Kaufmann	4	1	0	0	0	0	4	1
5	MF	12	(Denmark) Lukas Lerager	4	0	0	0	0	0	4	0
5	MF	6	(Denmark) Jens Stage	3	0	1	0	0	0	4	0
5	DF	20	(Denmark) Nicolai Boilesen	3	1	0	0	0	0	3	1
5	MF	11	(Denmark) Mohamed Daramy	4	0	0	0	0	0	4	0
5	MF	33	(Denmark) Rasmus Falk	3	0	0	0	1	0	4	0
10	MF	7	(Denmark) Viktor Fischer	2	1	0	0	0	0	2	1
10	MF	9	(Poland) Kamil Wilczek	2	0	1	0	0	0	3	0
10	DF	19	(Costa Rica) Bryan Oviedo	3	0	0	0	0	0	3	0
10	FW	23	(Denmark) Jonas Wind	3	0	0	0	0	0	3	0
10	DF	22	(Denmark) Peter Ankersen	2	0	0	0	1	0	3	0
15	GK	21	(Sweden) Karl-Johan Johnsson	1	0	1	0	0	0	2	0
15	DF	17	(Croatia) Karlo Bartolec	2	0	0	0	0	0	2	0
17	MF	24	(Croatia) Robert Mudražija	0	0	0	0	1	0	1	0
17	MF	16	(Spain) Pep Biel	1	0	0	0	0	0	1	0
17	DF	27	(Iceland) Ragnar Sigurðsson	0	0	0	0	1	0	1	0
17	DF	26	(Greece) Marios Oikonomou	0	0	1	0	0	0	1	0
17	MF	35	(New Zealand) Marko Stamenic	1	0	0	0	0	0	1	0
17	DF	5	(Denmark) Andreas Bjelland	1	0	0	0	0	0	1	0
17	FW	28	(Sierra Leone) Mustapha Bundu	1	0	0	0	0	0	1	0
17	DF	34	(Denmark) Victor Kristiansen	1	0	0	0	0	0	1	0
TOTALS				64	5	5	0	7	0	76	5
