= Jonas Wind =

Danish footballer (born 1999)

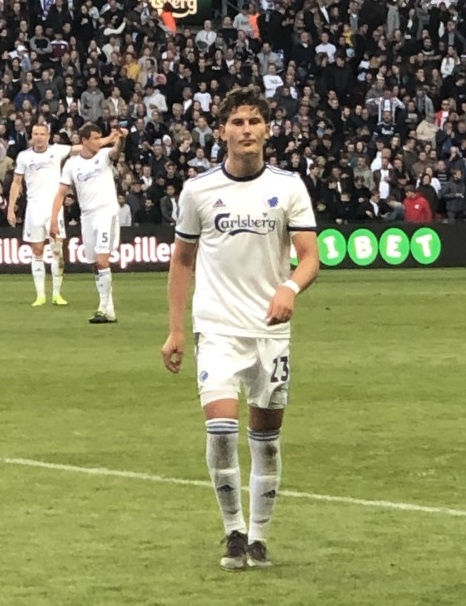
- Wind with Copenhagen in 2019

Personal information
- Full name: Jonas Older Wind
- Date of birth: 7 February 1999 (age 27)
- Place of birth: Hvidovre, Denmark
- Height: 1.90 m (6 ft 3 in)
- Positions: Striker; second striker

Team information
- Current team: Braga
- Number: 19

Youth career
- 2007–2010: Avedøre
- 2010–2012: Rosenhøj Boldklub
- 2012–2017: Copenhagen

Senior career*
Years	Team	Apps	(Gls)
2018–2022	Copenhagen	88	(36)
2022–2026	VfL Wolfsburg	114	(32)
2026–	Braga	4	(1)

International career^{‡}
2015–2016	Denmark U17	12	(0)
2016–2017	Denmark U18	3	(1)
2017–2018	Denmark U19	9	(8)
2019	Denmark U21	2	(1)
2020–	Denmark	37	(8)
- * Club domestic league appearances and goals as of 22:13, 19 October 2026 (UTC) ‡ National team caps and goals as of 23:12, 15 November 2025 (UTC)

Jonas Older Wind (Danish pronunciation: [ˈjoː.næs ˈvenˀ]; born 7 February 1999) is a Danish professional footballer who plays as a forward for Primeira Liga club Braga and the Denmark national team. He is the son of former goalkeeper Per Wind.

== Club career ==
=== Early career ===
Wind began his career in Avedøre IF in 2007 and moved to Rosenhøj Boldklub in 2010, where he was named youth player of the year in 2011. At only twelve years old, he was the youngest player ever to receive this honour.

Wind played 12 games for Denmark's U17 national team and three matches for the U18 national team. He scored eight goals in nine matches for the U19 national team. In March 2019, he had his two first matches in the U21 national team, scoring in the second against Belgium in the 90th minute.

=== FC Copenhagen ===
In July 2012, Wind was admitted to the FCK School of Excellence. He played for the club's U17, U18 and U19 teams until 2018. Here, he scored nine goals for U17 in the 2014/15 season, became top scorer in the U17 league and for FCK's U17 team in 2015–16 with 28 goals in 24 games. He was the third-highest scoring player in the U19 league in 2016–17.

Wind signed a contract for the senior team with FC Copenhagen on his nineteenth birthday on 7 February 2018, and debuted at Wanda Metropolitano against Atletico Madrid on 22 February. He scored his first senior goal in FC Copenhagen's 2–1 Superliga win against AaB on 18 April. On 26 April 2018, Wind was awarded Kjøbenhavns Boldklub's youth talent award 'Granen'.

On 4 November 2018, Wind secured a derby victory over rivals Brøndby IF when he first-timed a Robert Skov cross in goal during overtime.

Wind kicked off the 2019–20 Superliga season in fine fashion with goals in the first three games against OB, AGF, and AC Horsens.

On 6 August 2019, Wind scored a Panenka penalty kick in the exact same stadium as the original Panenka forcing the goalkeeper to his right and chipping the ball in high in the middle of the goal. This sealed the match result to a 1–1 draw between Red Star Belgrade and Copenhagen in the first leg of the third qualifying round to the 2019–20 UEFA Champions League. Through his first 42 games for FC Copenhagen in all competitions, he had scored twelve goals and provided seven assists.

On 5 August 2020, Wind scored two goals in a 3–0 win over Turkish champions İstanbul Başakşehir to secure a place in the quarter-finals of the Europa League.

=== Wolfsburg ===
On 31 January 2022, Wind signed a contract with German club VfL Wolfsburg until 2026. On 19 February, he scored his first goal in a 2–1 home defeat against Hoffenheim. In the 2022–23 season, he became the joint-top scorer at the club with six goals in all competitions, along with Yannick Gerhardt and Omar Marmoush.

In his first ten matches of the 2023–24 season, he managed to score eight goals including two back-to-back braces against Heidenheim and Köln in the first two opening matches. On 6 October 2024, he scored two goals in a 3–2 victory over VfL Bochum in the 2024–25 Bundesliga season. On 8 December 2024, he scored two goals in a 4–3 victory over Mainz in the 2024-25 Bundesliga season.

== International career ==
On 7 October 2020, Wind made his international debut in a 4–0 friendly win over the Faroe Islands. On 25 May 2021, he got called up by coach Kasper Hjulmand for the UEFA Euro 2020. In November 2022, he was named in the 26-man squad for the 2022 FIFA World Cup in Qatar.

== Personal life ==
Wind is an Arsenal supporter.

== Career statistics ==
=== Club ===
As of match played 29 October 2026

Appearances and goals by club, season and competition
Club	Season	League			National cup (Note: Includes Danish Cup, DFB-Pokal)		League Cup		Europe		Other		Total	
Club	Season	Division	Apps	Goals	Apps	Goals	Apps	Goals	Apps	Goals	Apps	Goals	Apps	Goals
Copenhagen	2017–18	Danish Superliga	10	2	0	0	—		1 (Note: Appearance(s) in UEFA Europa League)	0	—		11	2
Copenhagen	2018–19	Danish Superliga	21	6	1	0	—		2	0	—		24	6
Copenhagen	2019–20	Danish Superliga	13	7	0	0	—		6 (Note: Four appearances and one goal in UEFA Champions League, two appearances and two goals in UEFA Europa League)	3	—		19	10
Copenhagen	2020–21	Danish Superliga	28	15	1	0	—		3	2	—		32	17
Copenhagen	2021–22	Danish Superliga	16	6	1	0	—		10 (Note: Appearances in UEFA Conference League)	5	—		27	11
Copenhagen	Total		88	36	3	0	—		22	10	—		113	46
VfL Wolfsburg	2021–22	Bundesliga	14	5	—		—		—		—		14	5
VfL Wolfsburg	2022–23	Bundesliga	24	6	2	0	—		—		—		26	6
VfL Wolfsburg	2023–24	Bundesliga	34	11	3	1	—		—		—		37	12
VfL Wolfsburg	2024–25	Bundesliga	31	9	4	2	—		—		—		35	11
VfL Wolfsburg	2025–26	Bundesliga	11	1	0	0	—		—		1 (Note: Appearance in Bundesliga promotion play-offs)	0	12	1
VfL Wolfsburg	Total		114	32	9	3	—		—		1	0	124	35
Braga	2026–27	Primeira Liga	4	1	0	0	1	0	1	0	—		6	1
Career total			204	68	12	3	1	0	23	10	1	0	241	81

=== International ===
As of match played 15 November 2025

Appearances and goals by national team and year
National team	Year	Apps	Goals
Denmark	2020	4	2
Denmark	2021	8	2
Denmark	2022	3	1
Denmark	2023	10	3
Denmark	2024	9	0
Denmark	2025	3	0
Total		37	8

Scores and results list Denmark's goal tally first, score column indicates score after each Wind goal.

List of international goals scored by Jonas Wind
No.	Date	Venue	Cap	Opponent	Score	Result	Competition
1	11 November 2020	Brøndby Stadion, Brøndbyvester, Denmark	2	Sweden	1–0	2–0	Friendly
2	18 November 2020	Den Dreef, Leuven, Belgium	4	Belgium	1–1	2–4	2020–21 UEFA Nations League A
3	25 March 2021	Bloomfield Stadium, Tel Aviv, Israel	5	Israel	2–0	2–0	2022 FIFA World Cup qualification
4	4 September 2021	Tórsvøllur, Tórshavn, Faroe Islands	11	Faroe Islands	1–0	1–0	2022 FIFA World Cup qualification
5	13 June 2022	Parken Stadium, Copenhagen, Denmark	15	Austria	1–0	2–0	2022–23 UEFA Nations League A
6	16 June 2023	Parken Stadium, Copenhagen, Denmark	18	Northern Ireland	1–0	1–0	UEFA Euro 2024 qualifying
7	7 September 2023	Parken Stadium, Copenhagen, Denmark	20	San Marino	3–0	4–0	UEFA Euro 2024 qualifying
8	14 October 2023	Parken Stadium, Copenhagen, Denmark	22	Kazakhstan	1–0	3–1	UEFA Euro 2024 qualifying

== Honours ==
Copenhagen

- Danish Superliga: 2018–19 2021–22

Individual

- Bundesliga Rookie of the Month: February 2022
- Bundesliga Goal of the Month: February 2022
