= 2018–19 F.C. Copenhagen season =

F.C. Copenhagen
2018–19 season
- Owner: Parken Sport & Entertainment
- Chairman: Bo Rygaard
- Manager: (Norway) Ståle Solbakken
- Stadium: Telia Parken
- Superliga: Champions
- Danish Cup: 4th Round
- UEFA Europa League: Group Stage
- Top goalscorer: League: Robert Skov 29; All: Robert Skov 31
- Highest home attendance: 27,248 (12 Aug vs. Brøndby IF)
- Lowest home attendance: 7,145 (19 July vs. KuPS)
- Average home league attendance: 17,260
- Biggest win: 5–0 (2 Aug vs. Stjarnan FC) and 6–1 (10 Feb vs. OB)
- Biggest defeat: 0–4 (12 May vs. FC Midtjylland
Home colours	Away colours	Third colours

The 2018–19 FC Copenhagen season was F.C. Copenhagen's 27th season of existence, competing each year in the Danish Superliga, the top tier of football in Denmark. In addition to capturing its 13th Danish Superliga championship, FCK competed in the Danish Cup, exiting in the fourth round, and the UEFA Europa League, advancing to the group stage.

== Kits ==
Home	Away	Third (League)	Third (Playoffs)

== Squad ==
As of 31 March 2019

No.	Name	Nationality	Position	Since	Date of birth	Signed from
Goalkeepers
1	Stephan Andersen	(Denmark)	GK	2014	26 November 1981	(Spain) Real Betis
21	Jesse Joronen	(Finland)	GK	2018	21 March 1993	(Denmark) AC Horsens
31	Frederik Ibsen	(Denmark)	GK	2018	28 March 1997	(Denmark) Vendsyssel FF
Defenders
2	Guillermo Varela	(Spain) (Uruguay)	DF	2019	24 March 1993	(Uruguay) Peñarol
3	Pierre Bengtsson	(Sweden)	DF	2017	12 April 1988	(Germany) 1. FSV Mainz 05
4	Sotirios Papagiannopoulos	(Sweden)	DF	2018	5 September 1990	(Sweden) Östersunds FK
5	Andreas Bjelland	(Denmark)	DF	2018	11 July 1988	(England) Brentford F.C.
19	Denis Vavro	(Slovakia)	DF	2017	10 April 1996	(Slovakia) MŠK Žilina
20	Nicolai Boilesen	(Denmark)	DF	2016	16 February 1992	(Netherlands) AFC Ajax
22	Peter Ankersen	(Denmark)	DF	2016	22 September 1990	(Austria) FC Red Bull Salzburg
27	Michael Lüftner	(Czech Republic)	DF	2016	14 March 1994	(Czech Republic) SK Slavia Prague
Midfielders
6	William Kvist	(Denmark)	MF	2015	24 February 1985	(England) Wigan Athletic F.C.
7	Viktor Fischer	(Denmark)	MF	2018	9 June 1994	(Germany) 1. FSV Mainz 05
8	Nicolaj Thomsen	(Denmark)	MF	2017	8 May 1993	(France) FC Nantes
10	Zeca	(Greece) (Portugal)	MF	2017	31 Aug 1988	(Greece) Panathinaikos F.C.
24	Robert Mudražija	(Croatia)	MF	2019	5 May 1997	(Croatia) NK Osijek
29	Robert Skov	(Denmark)	MF	2018	20 May 1996	(Denmark) Silkeborg IF
33	Rasmus Falk	(Denmark)	MF	2016	15 January 1992	(Denmark) OB
Forwards
14	Dame N'Doye	(Senegal)	FW	2018	21 February 1985	(Turkey) Trabzonspor
23	Jonas Wind	(Denmark)	FW	2016	7 February 1999	Homegrown
28	Pieros Sotiriou	(Cyprus)	FW	2017	13 January 1993	(Cyprus) APOEL FC
40	Mohamed Daramy	(Sierra Leone)	FW	2015	7 January 2002	(Denmark) Hvidovre IF (U14)

== Transfers and loans ==
=== Arrivals ===
==== Summer ====
Position	Player	Transferred from	Date
GK	(Finland) Jesse Joronen	AC Horsens	July 1, 2018
DF	(Sweden) (Greece) Sotiris Papagiannopoulos	Östersunds FK	July 1, 2018
FW	(Senegal) Dame N'Doye	Trabzonspor	July 2, 2018
MF	(Bosnia and Herzegovina) (Spain) Kenan Kodro	1. FSV Mainz 05	July 3, 2018
DF	(Denmark) Andreas Bjelland	Brentford F.C.	July 9, 2018
GK	(Denmark) Frederik Ibsen	Vendsyssel FF	August 31, 2018

==== Winter ====
Position	Player	Transferred from	Date
DF	(Spain) (Uruguay) Guillermo Varela	Peñarol	January 1, 2019
MF	(Croatia) Robert Mudražija	NK Osijek	January 28, 2019
MF	(Ivory Coast) Aboubakar Keita	Stabæk	January 30, 2019

=== Departures ===
==== Summer ====
Position	Player	Transferred to	Date
FW	(Paraguay) Federico Santander	Bologna F.C. 1909	July 1, 2018
FW	(Serbia) Andrija Pavlović	SK Rapid Wien	July 1, 2018
GK	(Hungary) László Köteles	Released	July 1, 2018
MF	(Denmark) (Morocco) Youssef Toutouh	Released	July 1, 2018
DF	(Sweden) Erik Johansson	Djurgårdens IF	July 15, 2018
GK	(Sweden) (Denmark) Robin Olsen	AS Roma	July 24, 2018
FW	(Denmark) (North Macedonia) Bashkim Kadrii	OB	August 31, 2018

==== Winter ====
Position	Player	Transferred to	Date
MF	(Slovakia) Ján Greguš	Minnesota United FC	January 1, 2019
FW	(Bosnia and Herzegovina) Kenan Kodro	Athletic Bilbao	January 31, 2019

=== Loan in ===
Position	Player	Loaned from	Start	End

=== Loan out ===
Position	Player	Loaned to	Start	End
MF	(Serbia) Uroš Matić	FK Austria Wien	July 1, 2018	June 30, 2019
MF	(Ivory Coast) Aboubakar Keita	Stabæk IF	August 13, 2018	January 30, 2019
DF	(Denmark) Mads Roerslev	Vendsyssel FF	January 1, 2019	June 30, 2019
FW	(Denmark) Carlo Holse	Esbjerg fB	January 30, 2019	June 30, 2019
MF	(Ivory Coast) Aboubakar Keita	OH Leuven	January 31, 2019	June 30, 2019

== Non-competitive ==
=== Pre-season Friendlies ===
27 June 2018	(Denmark) F.C. Copenhagen	2–3	(Denmark) Lyngby Boldklub	Frederiksberg
13:00	Skov 30' (pen.); Kirkeby 37'	FCK Summary	Marcussen 10'; Kjær 45+1'; Stückler 85'	Stadium: FC Københavns træningsanlæg Nummer 10; Attendance: 200; Referee: Peter Munch Larsen

1 July 2018	(Austria) SK Sturm Graz	1–0	(Denmark) F.C. Copenhagen	(Germany) Ilz
17:30	Jantscher 2' (pen.)	FCK Summary		Stadium: Sportarena SV Ilz; Attendance: 750; Referee: (Austria) Rene Eisner

4 July 2018	(Slovenia) NK Maribor	0–0	(Denmark) F.C. Copenhagen	(Slovenia) Murska Sobota
17:30	Jantscher 2' (pen.)	FCK Summary		Stadium: Bakovci Stadion; Attendance: 100; Referee: (Slovenia) Simon Grlec

7 July 2018	(Russia) PFC CSKA Moscow	1–4	(Denmark) F.C. Copenhagen	(Austria) Loipersdorf bei Fürstenfeld
18:00	Gordyushenko 56'	FCK Summary	Falk 6'; Kodro 20'; Greguš 61'; Kardii 70'	Stadium: Waldstadion Dietersdorf; Attendance: 75

== Competitive ==
=== Competition record ===
Competition	Record							
Competition	G	W	D	L	GF	GA	GD	Win %
Superliga	36	26	4	6	86	37	+49	72.22
Sydbank Pokalen	2	1	0	1	3	2	+1	50.00
Europa League	13	6	5	2	16	7	+9	46.15
Total	51	33	9	9	105	46	+59	64.71

Last updated: 25 May 2019.
Source: Competitive matches

=== Danish Superliga ===
==== Regular season ====
Pos	Team	Pld	W	D	L	GF	GA	GD	Pts	Qualification
1	Copenhagen	26	19	4	3	65	23	+42	61	Qualification for the Championship round
2	Midtjylland	26	18	6	2	62	26	+36	60	Qualification for the Championship round
3	OB	26	12	6	8	35	31	+4	42	Qualification for the Championship round
4	Brøndby	26	11	5	10	44	40	+4	38	Qualification for the Championship round
5	Esbjerg	26	11	5	10	32	35	−3	38	Qualification for the Championship round

Source: Danish Football Association (in Danish), Soccerway
Rules for classification: 1) Points; 2) Goal difference; 3) Goals scored; 4) Away goals scored; 5) Play-off (played on neutral ground if determining teams for different rounds); 6) Draw.

===== Matches =====
16 July 2018 Round 1	F.C. Copenhagen	1–2	AC Horsens	Copenhagen
18:00	Fischer (yellow card) 77'; Ankersen (yellow card) 82'; Falk 85' (Boilsen); Boilesen (yellow card) 90+4'	FCK Summary	Jacobsen (yellow card) 52' (goal) 67'; Borring (yellow card) 54'; Hansson 59'; Nymann (yellow card) 71'; Qvist (yellow card) 82'; Delač (yellow card) 90'	Stadium: Telia Parken; Attendance: 11,890; Referee: Mads-Kristoffer Kristoffersen

23 July 2018 Round 2	Hobro IK	0–3	F.C. Copenhagen	Hobro
19:00	Putros (yellow card) 48'; Gotfredsen (yellow card) 86'		Fischer 30'; Skov 71' (N'Doye) 87'	Stadium: DS Arena; Attendance: 3,511; Referee: Jørgen Daugbjerg Burchardt

29 July 2018 Round 3	F.C. Copenhagen	4–0	AaB	Copenhagen
18:00	N'Doye 6' (Fischer) 15' (Skov) 22' (Fischer); Skov (yellow card) 59'; Fischer 90+2' (Ankersen)	FCK Summary		Stadium: Telia Parken; Attendance: 12,012; Referee: Michael Tykgaard

5 August 2018 Round 4	OB	0–1	F.C. Copenhagen	Odense
16:00	Fischer (yellow card) 57'; Falk (yellow card) 58'; N'Doye 85' (Falk)	FCK Summary	Drachmann (yellow card) 82'	Stadium: Nature Energy Park; Attendance: 9,389; Referee: Jens Grabski Maae

12 August 2018 Round 5	F.C. Copenhagen	3–1	Brøndby IF	Copenhagen
16:00	Skov 35'; Zeca (yellow card) 75'; Thomsen 77' (Fischer); Fischer 81' (N'Doye)	FCK Summary	Radošević (yellow card) 24'; Röcker (yellow card) 34'; Erceg 51' (Wilczek) (yellow card) 87'; Tibbling (yellow card) 70'; Fisker (yellow card) 84'; Mukhtar (yellow card) 90+2'	Stadium: Telia Parken; Attendance: 27,248; Referee: Peter Kjærsgaard

19 August 2018 Round 6	AGF	1–1	F.C. Copenhagen	Aarhus
16:00	Stage 38' (Bundu) (yellow card) 90+5'	FCK Summary	Fischer 90+2' (N'Doye)	Stadium: Ceres Park; Attendance: 15,778; Referee: Michael Tykgaard

26 August 2018 Round 7	F.C. Copenhagen	3–2	SønderjyskE	Copenhagen
16:00	Greguš 30' (Bengtsson); Holse 40' (Fischer); Vavro (yellow card) 44'; N'Doye 75'	FCK Summary	Lieder 12' (Poulsen) (yellow card) 44'; Luijckx (yellow card) 24'; Pedersen (yellow card) 44'; Jónsson (yellow card) 77'; Fredericksen 83'	Stadium: Telia Parken; Attendance: 11,544; Referee: Jakob Kehlet

2 September 2018 Round 8	Esbjerg fB	0–2	F.C. Copenhagen	Esbjerg
16:00	Kauko (yellow card) 82'	FCK Summary	N'Doye 7' (Fischer); Fischer 19'	Stadium: Blue Water Arena; Attendance: 9,841; Referee: Poulsen

16 September 2018 Round 9	FC Midtjylland	3–1	F.C. Copenhagen	Herning
18:00	Poulsen 15' (pen.); Onuachu 61' (Mabil); Dal Hende 83'; Andersson (yellow card) 90+1'	FCK Summary	Joronen (yellow card) 15'; Ankersen (yellow card) 69'; N'Doye 74' (Fischer); Fischer (yellow card) 87'	Stadium: MCH Arena; Attendance: 10,973; Referee: Mads-Kristoffer Kristoffersen

23 September 2018 Round 10	F.C. Copenhagen	2–1	FC Nordsjælland	Copenhagen
16:00	Skov 10' (Fischer); Fischer 59' (Ankersen)	FCK Summary	Christensen (yellow card) 34'; Olsen 50' (Christensen); Jenssen (yellow card) 63'	Stadium: Telia Parken; Attendance: 22,025; Referee: Jens Grabski Maae

30 September 2018 Round 11	Vendsyssel FF	2–1	F.C. Copenhagen	Hjørring
12:00	Thorsteinsson 76'; Knudsen 79' (Ogude)	FCK Summary	Skov 25' (Fischer); Joronen (yellow card) 78'; Sotiriou (yellow card) 90+9'	Stadium: Nord Energi Arena; Attendance: 2,554; Referee: Jakob Kehlet

7 October 2018 Round 12	F.C. Copenhagen	4–0	Randers FC	Copenhagen
16:00	N'Doye 31' (Skov); Sotiriou 57' (Boilesen); Skov 64' (Ankersen); Kodro 84' (Holse)	FCK Summary	Kallesøe (yellow card) 40'; Riis (yellow card) 69'	Stadium: Telia Parken; Attendance: 14,129; Referee: Jørgen Daugbjerg Burchardt

21 October 2018 Round 13	Vejle BK	1–3	F.C. Copenhagen	Vejle
16:00	Louati 34' (Hallberg); Sousa (yellow card) 45+1'; Hallberg (yellow card) 51'	FCK Summary	N'Doye 72' (Vavro); Skov 74' (Bjelland); Sotiriou 90+3' (Skov)	Stadium: Vejle Stadium; Attendance: 9,138; Referee: Jens Grabski Maae

28 October 2018 Round 14	F.C. Copenhagen	4–2	AGF	Copenhagen
16:00	Skov 22', 52'; Bjelland (yellow card) 60'; Boilesen 79' (Sotiriou); Fischer 80'	FCK Summary	Ankersen 2' (Mikanović); Stage 55' (Sana) (yellow card) 65'	Stadium: Telia Parken; Attendance: 12,856; Referee: Peter Kjærsgaard

4 November 2018 Round 15	Brøndby IF	0–1	F.C. Copenhagen	Brøndby
12:30	Radošević (yellow card) 39'; Kaiser (yellow card) 56'; Jung (yellow card) 83'	FCK Summary	Wind 90+1' (Skov)	Stadium: Brøndby Stadium; Attendance: 20,731; Referee: Michael Johansen

11 November 2018 Round 16	AaB	1–1	F.C. Copenhagen	Aalborg
16:00	Abildgaard (yellow card) 26'; Andersen 58' (Ahlmann); Thellufsen (yellow card) 80'	FCK Summary	Bjelland (yellow card) 38'; Greguš (yellow card) 45+3'; N'Doye 83' (Falk); Falk (yellow card) 90+3'	Stadium: Aalborg Portland Park; Attendance: 6,947; Referee: Michael Tykgaard

25 November 2018 Round 17	F.C. Copenhagen	2–1	FC Midtjylland	Copenhagen
18:00	Skov 34' (pen.); Ankersen (yellow card) 41'; Bengtsson (yellow card) 80'; Greguš 82'	FCK Summary	Dal Hende (yellow card) 74'; Greguš 78' (o.g.); Poulsen (yellow card) 90'	Stadium: Telia Parken; Attendance: 18,553; Referee: Jakob Kehlet

2 December 2018 Round 18	AC Horsens	1–6	F.C. Copenhagen	Horsens
16:00	Delač (red card) 20'; Hansson 45+4' (Frantsen); Jacobsen (yellow card) 68'	FCK Summary	Skov 23' 66' (Boilesen) 90' (Falk); N'Doye 28' (Zeca); Greguš (yellow card) 39'; Wind 64' (Boilesen) 71' (Bengtsson)	Stadium: CASA Arena Horsens; Attendance: 3,217; Referee: Peter Kjærsgaard

9 December 2018 Round 19	F.C. Copenhagen	3–0	Esbjerg fB	Copenhagen
16:00	N'Doye 4' (Ankersen); Skov 45' (pen.) 56' (pen.)	FCK Summary	Højbjerg (yellow card) 44'; Austin (yellow card) 56'	Stadium: Telia Parken; Attendance: 11,193; Referee: Jens Grabski Maae

16 December 2018 Round 20	SønderjyskE	0–3	F.C. Copenhagen	Haderslev
16:00	Frederiksen (yellow card) 61'	FCK Summary	Skov 12' (Ankersen) 42' (Ankersen) 62'; Kvist (yellow card) 81'	Stadium: Sydbank Park; Attendance: 5,142; Referee: Mads-Kristoffer Kristoffersen

10 February 2019 Round 21	F.C. Copenhagen	6–1	OB	Copenhagen
18:00	Thomsen 22'; Ankersen 30' (Skov); Skov 45' 78' 90+3' (pen.); Zeca 52'; Boilsen (yellow card) 59'; Vavro (yellow card) 66'	FCK Summary	Drachmann (yellow card) 44'; Laursen 60' (Lund); Leeuwin (yellow card) 77'; Lund (yellow card) 90+2'	Stadium: Telia Parken; Attendance: 15,164; Referee: Mads-Kristoffer Kristoffersen

17 February 2019 Round 22	Randers FC	0–2	F.C. Copenhagen	Randers
16:00	Riis Jakobsen (red card) 75'	FCK Summary	Falk 22' (Skov); Zeca (yellow card) 29'; N'Doye 78' (Falk)	Stadium: BioNutria Park Randers; Attendance: 5,477; Referee: Jens Grabski Maae

24 February 2019 Round 23	F.C. Copenhagen	1–1	Vendsyssel FF	Copenhagen
TBD	Zeca (yellow card) 28'; Falk 61' (Wind); Sotiriou (yellow card) 77'	FCK Summary	Júnior (yellow card) 16' (yellow-red card) 44'; Opondo 31'; Konaté (yellow card) 39'; Knudsen (yellow card) 85'	Stadium: Telia Parken; Attendance: 11,116; Referee: Michael Johansen

3 March 2019 Round 24	F.C. Copenhagen	2–0	Vejle	Copenhagen
16:00	Wind 11' (Ankersen); Zeca (yellow card) 34'; Skov 45+1' (pen.); Falk (yellow card) 87'	FCK Summary	Finnbogason (yellow card) 81'; Sousa (yellow card) 88'	Stadium: Telia Parken; Attendance: 13,906; Referee: Morten Krogh

10 March 2019 Round 25	FC Nordsjælland	2–2	F.C. Copenhagen	Farum
TBD	Jenssen 47' (Nelsson) (yellow card) 88'; Nelsson (yellow card) 58'; Olsen 67' (Donyoh)	FCK Summary	N'Doye 38' (Fischer); Skov 80'	Stadium: Right to Dream Park; Attendance: 8,353; Referee: Jorgen Daugbjerg Burchardt

17 March 2019 Round 26	F.C. Copenhagen	2–2	Hobro IK	Copenhagen
17:00	Skov 13'; N'Doye 56' (Bengtsson); Wind 85'	FCK Summary	Babayan 4'; Damborg (yellow card) 11'; Mikkelsen (yellow card) 68'	Stadium: Telia Parken; Attendance: 16,143; Referee: Michael Tykgaard

==== Championship Round ====
Pos	Team	Pld	W	D	L	GF	GA	GD	Pts	Qualification	COP	MID	ESB	BRO	ODE	NOR
1	Copenhagen (C)	36	26	4	6	86	37	+49	82	Qualification for the Champions League second qualifying round	—	3–0	1–0	3–2	4–0	1–3
2	Midtjylland	36	21	8	7	76	43	+33	71	Qualification for the Europa League third qualifying round	4–0	—	1–2	1–2	2–0	0–0
3	Esbjerg	36	16	8	12	45	47	−2	56	Qualification for the Europa League second qualifying round	4–3	2–2	—	1–0	0–0	0–0
4	Brøndby (O)	36	15	7	14	60	52	+8	52	Qualification for the European play-off match	1–2	4–1	0–1	—	2–2	2–0
5	Odense	36	14	10	12	48	48	0	52		0–1	3–1	4–1	0–2	—	2–2
6	Nordsjælland	36	10	14	12	52	54	−2	44		0–3	1–2	1–2	1–1	2–2	—

Source: Soccerway
(C) Champions; (O) Play-off winners

===== Matches =====
31 March 2019 Championship Round 1	F.C. Copenhagen	1–0	Esbjerg FB	Copenhagen
16:00	Wind (yellow card) 32' (yellow-red card) 40'; Daramy 39' (Boilesen); Kvist (yellow card) 82'; Vavro (yellow card) 90+5'	FCK Summary	Tighadouini (yellow card) 42'; Yakovenko (yellow card) 45+5'; Brinch (yellow card) 51'; Halsti (yellow card) 82'	Stadium: Telia Parken; Attendance: 13,050; Referee: Mads-Kristoffer Kristoffersen

7 April 2019 Championship Round 2	OB	0–1	F.C. Copenhagen	Odense
18:00	Zeca (yellow card) 34'; N'Doye 77' (Thomsen); Bjelland (yellow card) 90+2'	FCK Summary	O. Lund (yellow card) 25'; Leeuwin (yellow card) 49'; Kadrii (yellow card) 66'	Stadium: Nature Energy Park; Attendance: 11,154; Referee: Jakob Kehlet

14 April 2019 Championship Round 3	Brøndby IF	1–2	F.C. Copenhagen	Brøndby
16:00	Hedlund 9' (yellow card) 12'; Arajuuri (yellow card) 66'	FCK Summary	Ankersen (yellow card) 12'; Skov 40' (Jonas Wind); Fischer 45' (Skov)	Stadium: Brøndby Stadium; Attendance: 19,086; Referee: Jorgen Daugbjerg Burchardt

18 April 2019 Championship Round 4	F.C. Copenhagen	3–0	FC Midtjylland	Copenhagen
18:00	Bjelland 26'; Falk (yellow card) 31'; N'Doye 39' 63' (Wind)	FCK Summary		Stadium: Telia Parken; Attendance: 25,321; Referee: Mads-Kristoffer Kristoffersen

22 April 2019 Championship Round 5	FC Nordsjælland	0–3	F.C. Copenhagen	Farum
16:00		FCK Summary	Fischer 26' (Wind); N'Doye 33' (Fischer); Skov 55' (Wind)	Stadium: Right to Dream Park; Attendance: 7,111; Referee: Jakob Kehlet

28 April 2019 Championship Round 6	F.C. Copenhagen	4–0	OB	Copenhagen
18:00	N'Doye 29' (Skov) 58' (Wind); Skov 55' (Boilesen); Thomsen 89' (Kvist)	FCK Summary	Grytebust (yellow card) 58'	Stadium: Telia Parken; Attendance: 15,230; Referee: Jens Grabski Maae

5 May 2019 Championship Round 7	F.C. Copenhagen	3–2	Brøndby IF	Copenhagen
16:00	Skov 10' (pen.); N'Doye 12' (Skov) (yellow card) 17'; Falk 64' (Ankersen); Joronen (yellow card) 90+4'	FCK Summary	Tibbling 6' (Hedlund); Gammelby (yellow card) 9'; Mensah (yellow card) 11'; Hermannsson (yellow card) 17'; Arajuuri (yellow card) 24'; Vavro 53' (o.g.); Radošević (yellow card) 74'; Hedlund (yellow card) 86'	Stadium: Telia Parken; Attendance: 33,134; Referee: Mads-Kristoffer Kristoffersen

12 May 2019 Championship Round 8	FC Midtjylland	4–0	F.C. Copenhagen	Herning
20:00	Onuachu 21'; Hansen (yellow card) 34'; Evander 53' (Wikheim); Mabil 89' (pen.); Wikheim 90+1' (Evander)	FCK Summary	Bjelland (yellow card) 82'; Falk (yellow card) 84'; Joronen (yellow card) 86'	Stadium: MCH Arena; Attendance: 7,343; Referee: Anders Poulsen

19 May 2019 Championship Round 9	Esbjerg fB	4–3	F.C. Copenhagen	Esbjerg
18:00	Tighadouini 9' (Sørensen) 30' (Anyembe) (yellow card) 53'; Halsti (yellow card) 62'; Vavro 80' (o.g.); Austin 90+3' (Lauridsen)	FCK Summary	Thomsen (yellow card) 17'; Højbjerg 53' (o.g.); Varela (yellow card) 58'; Skov 63' (pen.); Fischer (yellow card) 64'; Wind 75' (Fischer); Bjelland (yellow card) 90+4'	Stadium: Blue Water Arena; Attendance: 8,319; Referee: Sandi Putros

25 May 2019 Championship Round 10	F.C. Copenhagen	1–3	FC Nordsjælland	Copenhagen
17:00	Vavro (yellow card) 59'; Skov 60' (Falk)	FCK Summary	Jenssen (yellow card) 31'; Kudus 43' (Olsen) (yellow card) 89'; Olsen 72' (Jensen); Sadiq 90+2' (Damsgaard)	Stadium: Telia Parken; Attendance: 26,164; Referee: Michael Johansen

=== Sydbank Pokalen ===
==== Danish Cup Matches ====
27 September 2018 Third Round	Viby IF	0–3	F.C. Copenhagen	Viby
18:00 CEST		FCK Summary	Sotiriou 28' (pen.) 73' (Holse); Daramy 89' (Holse)	Stadium: Viby Idrætspark; Attendance: 1,740; Referee: Jakob Kehlet

1 November 2018 Fourth Round	FC Midtjylland	2–0	F.C. Copenhagen	Herning
19:30 CEST	Sviatchenko 5'; Onuachu (yellow card) 51'; Wikheim 62'; Dal Hende (yellow card) 90'	DBU Report	Skov (yellow card) 90'	Stadium: MCH Arena; Attendance: 7,366; Referee: Jakob Kehlet

=== UEFA Europa League ===
==== First qualifying round ====
Team 1	Agg.	Team 2	1st leg	2nd leg
KuPS (Finland)	1–2	(Denmark) F.C. Copenhagen	0–1	1–1

12 July 2018 First Leg	KuPS	0–1	F.C. Copenhagen	(Finland) Kuopio
18:00		FCK Summary	Skov 75'	Stadium: Savon Sanomat Areena; Attendance: 2,890; Referee: (Russia) Kirill Levnikov

19 July 2018 Second Leg	F.C. Copenhagen	1–1	KuPS	Copenhagen
20:00	Vavro 81' (pen.) (yellow card) 82'	FCK Summary	Rexhepi (yellow card) 51'; Karjalainen 75'	Stadium: Telia Parken; Attendance: 7,145; Referee: (Iceland) Vilhjalmur Thorarinsson

==== Second qualifying round ====
Team 1	Agg.	Team 2	1st leg	2nd leg
Stjarnan FC (Iceland)	0–7	(Denmark) F.C. Copenhagen	0–2	0–5

26 July 2018 First Leg	Stjarnan FC	0–2	F.C. Copenhagen	(Iceland) Garðabær
21:00		FCK Summary	N'Doye (yellow card) 19'; Kodro 52'; Fischer 58'	Stadium: Stjörnuvöllur; Attendance: 1,050; Referee: (Austria) Robert Schörgenhofer

2 August 2018 Second Leg	F.C. Copenhagen	5–0	Stjarnan FC	Copenhagen
20:00	Fischer 4'; Holse 24' (Roerslev); Kodro 39' (Roerslev) 47' (Roerslev) (yellow card) 71' (goal) 75' (Roerslev); Papagiannopoulos (yellow card) 90'	FCK Summary	Valdimarsson (yellow card) 79'; Laxdal (yellow card) 87'; Baldvinsson (yellow card) 90'	Stadium: Telia Parken; Attendance: 8,726; Referee: (England) Paul Tierney

==== Third qualifying round ====
Team 1	Agg.	Team 2	1st leg	2nd leg
PFC CSKA Sofia (Bulgaria)	2−4	(Denmark) F.C. Copenhagen	1–2	1–2

9 Aug 2018 First Leg	PFC CSKA Sofia	1–2	F.C. Copenhagen	(Bulgaria) Sofia
19:45	Maurides 15'; Chorbadzhiyski (red card) 41'; Lyaskov (yellow card) 54'; Pinto (yellow card) 73'; Bikel (yellow card) 90+2'	FCK Summary	Falk (yellow card) 34'; Vavro 64'; Kodro (yellow card) 66' (goal) 74' (pen.)	Stadium: Vasil Levski National Stadium; Attendance: 18,100; Referee: (Belgium) Bart Vertenten

16 Aug 2018 Second Leg	F.C. Copenhagen	2–1	PFC CSKA Sofia	Copenhagen
18:30	N'Doye 23' (Thomsen) 64' (Fischer); Greguš (yellow card) 26'	FCK Summary	Pereira (yellow card) 20'; Evandro 58' (Maurides); Malinov (yellow card) 71'; Bodurov (yellow card) 77'	Stadium: Telia Parken; Attendance: 10,078; Referee: (Turkey) Halil Umut Meler

==== Playoff round ====
Team 1	Agg.	Team 2	1st leg	2nd leg
Atalanta B.C. (Italy)	0−0 (p)	(Denmark) F.C. Copenhagen	0−0	0−0

23 Aug 2018 First Leg	Atalanta B.C.	0−0	F.C. Copenhagen	(Italy) Reggio Emilia
20:00	Gosens (yellow card) 58'	FCK Summary	Ankersen (yellow card) 50'; N'Doye (yellow card) 53'; Kvist (yellow card) 83'; Joronen (yellow card) 90'	Stadium: Mapei Stadium – Città del Tricolore; Referee: (Czech Republic) Pavel Královec

30 Aug 2018 Second Leg	F.C. Copenhagen	0−0 (a.e.t.) (4−3 p)	Atalanta B.C.	Copenhagen
18:30	Thomsen (yellow card) 70'; Ankersen (yellow card) 82'; Vavro (yellow card) 115'	FCK Summary	Palomino (yellow card) 84'; Pessina (yellow card) 110'	Stadium: Telia Parken; Attendance: 18,398; Referee: (Greece) Anastasios Sidiropoulos
	Penalties
	Sotiriou (penalty scored); Greguš (penalty scored); Skov (penalty scored); N'Doye (penalty missed); Vavro (penalty scored)		de Roon (penalty scored); Adnan (penalty scored); Gomez (penalty missed); Masiello (penalty scored); Cornelius (penalty missed)

==== Group stage ====
===== Group C =====
Pos	Team	Pld	W	D	L	GF	GA	GD	Pts	Qualification	ZEN	SLP	BOR	KOB
1	(Russia) Zenit Saint Petersburg	6	3	2	1	6	5	+1	11	Advance to knockout phase	—	1–0	2–1	1–0
2	(Czech Republic) Slavia Prague	6	3	1	2	4	3	+1	10	Advance to knockout phase	2–0	—	1–0	0–0
3	(France) Bordeaux	6	2	1	3	6	6	0	7		1–1	2–0	—	1–2
4	(Denmark) Copenhagen	6	1	2	3	3	5	−2	5		1–1	0–1	0–1	—

Source: UEFA
Rules for classification: Group stage tiebreakers

20 September 2018 1	F.C. Copenhagen (Denmark)	1−1	(Russia) FC Zenit Saint Petersburg	(Denmark) Copenhagen
21:00 CEST (UTC+02:00)	Boilesen (yellow card) 37'; Soteriou 63' (Fischer); Bjelland (yellow card) 68'; Papagiannopoulos (yellow card) 90+5'	FCK Summary	Mak 43' (Driussi); Dzyuba (yellow card) 90'; Marchisio (yellow card) 90+4'	Stadium: Telia Parken; Attendance: 19,005; Referee: (Bulgaria) Georgi Kabakov

4 October 2018 2	FC Girondins de Bordeaux (France)	1−2	(Denmark) F.C. Copenhagen	(France) Bordeaux
18:55 CEST (UTC+02:00)	Sankharé 84' (Cornelius)	FCK Report	Kvist (yellow card) 38'; Sotiriou 42' (Greguš) (yellow card) 52'; Papagiannopoulos (yellow card) 45+2'; Zeca (yellow card) 70' (yellow-red card) 30+3'; Skov 90+2' (Falk)	Stadium: Stade Matmut-Atlantique; Attendance: 11,860; Referee: (Israel) Roi Reinshreiber

25 October 2018 3	F.C. Copenhagen (Denmark)	0−1	(Czech Republic) SK Slavia Prague	(Denmark) Copenhagen
18:55 CEST (UTC+02:00)	Sotiriou (yellow card) 1'; N'Doye (yellow card) 23'	FCK Summary	Bořil (yellow card) 39'; Matoušek 46' (Coufal); Coufal (yellow card) 55'; Traoré (yellow card) 64'	Stadium: Telia Parken; Attendance: 20,672; Referee: (Italy) Luca Banti

8 November 2018 4	SK Slavia Prague (Czech Republic)	0−0	(Denmark) F.C. Copenhagen	(Czech Republic) Prague
21:00 CEST (UTC+02:00)	Ngadeu-Ngadjui (yellow card) 52'; Bořil (yellow card) 55'	FCK Summary	N'Doye (yellow card) 84'	Stadium: Eden Arena; Attendance: 18,702; Referee: (Finland) Mattias Gestranius

29 November 2018 5	FC Zenit Saint Petersburg (Russia)	1−0	(Denmark) F.C. Copenhagen	(Russia) Saint Petersburg
18:55 CEST (UTC+02:00)	Mak 59' (Kuzyayev); Yerokhin (yellow card) 67'; Ozdoyev (yellow card) 89'	FCK Summary	Skov (yellow card) 63'; Zeca (yellow card) 73'	Stadium: Krestovsky Stadium; Attendance: 45,199; Referee: (Slovenia) Slavko Vinčić

13 December 2018 6	F.C. Copenhagen (Denmark)	0−1	(France) FC Girondins de Bordeaux	(Denmark) Copenhagen
21:00 CEST (UTC+02:00)	Skov (yellow card) 22'; Falk (yellow card) 29'	FCK Report	Briand (yellow card) 25' (goal) 73' (Karamoh)	Stadium: Telia Parken; Attendance: 18,209; Referee: (Turkey) Hüseyin Göçek

== Statistics ==
=== Appearances ===
As of 25 May 2019

This includes all competitive matches.

Rank	Pos	No.	Player	Superliga	Sydbank Pokalen	UEFA Europa League	Total
1	DF	19	(Slovakia) Denis Vavro	36	1	13	50
2	MF	29	(Denmark) Robert Skov	35	1	12	48
3	DF	22	(Denmark) Peter Ankersen	35	1	11	47
3	MF	33	(Denmark) Rasmus Falk	34	2	11	47
5	FW	14	(Senegal) Dame N'Doye	34	0	12	46
6	MF	10	(Greece) (Portugal) Zeca	32	1	12	45
7	DF	5	(Denmark) Andreas Bjelland	31	0	10	41
8	MF	8	(Denmark) Nicolaj Thomsen	29	1	10	40
9	GK	21	(Finland) Jesse Joronen	31	1	6	38
10	DF	20	(Denmark) Nicolai Boilesen	26	0	10	36
11	MF	16	(Slovakia) Ján Greguš	19	2	13	34
11	MF	7	(Denmark) Viktor Fischer	26	0	8	34
13	FW	28	(Cyprus) Pieros Sotiriou	21	2	8	31
14	DF	4	(Sweden) Sotirios Papagiannopoulos	19	2	9	30
15	DF	3	(Sweden) Pierre Bengtsson	16	2	7	25
16	FW	23	(Denmark) Jonas Wind	21	1	2	24
17	MF	6	(Denmark) William Kvist	16	1	4	21
18	FW	11	(Bosnia and Herzegovina) Kenan Kodro	9	2	7	18
19	FW	26	(Denmark) Carlo Holse	11	2	4	17
20	GK	1	(Denmark) Stephan Andersen	7	1	7	15
21	FW	40	(Denmark) Mohammed Daramy	11	1	0	12
22	DF	2	(Uruguay) Guillermo Varela	7	0	0	7
23	MF	44	(Denmark) Ahmed Daghim	3	1	0	4
24	DF	27	(Czech Republic) Michael Lüftner	1	0	1	2
24	DF	18	(Denmark) Mads Roerslev	0	1	1	2
24	MF	24	(Croatia) Robert Mudražija	2	0	0	2
27	MF	17	(Denmark) Bashkim Kadrii	0	0	1	1
27	DF	42	(Denmark) Niklas Vesterlund	0	1	0	1
27	DF	43	(Denmark) Jacob Haahr	0	1	0	1
27	GK	31	(Denmark) Frederik Ibsen	1	0	0	1

=== Goalscorers ===
As of 25 May 2019

This includes all competitive matches.

Rnk	Pos	No.	Player	Superliga	Sydbank Pokalen	UEFA Europa League	Total
1	MF	29	(Denmark) Robert Skov	29	0	2	31
2	FW	14	(Senegal) Dame N'Doye	22	0	2	24
3	MF	7	(Denmark) Viktor Fischer	9	0	2	11
4	FW	11	(Bosnia and Herzegovina) Kenan Kodro	1	0	5	6
4	FW	28	(Cyprus) Pieros Sotiriou	2	2	2	6
4	FW	23	(Denmark) Jonas Wind	6	0	0	6
7	MF	33	(Denmark) Rasmus Falk	4	0	0	4
7	MF	8	(Denmark) Nicolaj Thomsen	3	0	0	3
8	FW	26	(Denmark) Carlo Holse	1	0	1	2
8	DF	19	(Slovakia) Denis Vavro	0	0	2	2
8	MF	16	(Slovakia) Ján Greguš	2	0	0	2
8	MF	40	(Denmark) Mohamed Daramy	1	1	0	2
12	DF	20	(Denmark) Nicolai Boilesen	1	0	0	1
12	MF	10	(Greece) (Portugal) Zeca	1	0	0	1
12	DF	22	(Denmark) Peter Ankersen	1	0	0	1
12	DF	5	(Denmark) Andreas Bjelland	1	0	0	1
TOTALS				84	3	16	103

=== Assists ===
As of 25 May 2019

This includes all competitive matches.

Rnk	Pos	No.	Player	Superliga	Sydbank Pokalen	UEFA Europa League	Total
1	MF	7	(Denmark) Viktor Fischer	11	0	2	13
2	MF	29	(Denmark) Robert Skov	9	0	0	9
3	DF	22	(Denmark) Peter Ankersen	8	0	0	8
4	DF	26	(Denmark) Nicolai Boilesen	6	0	0	6
4	FW	23	(Denmark) Jonas Wind	6	0	0	6
4	MF	33	(Denmark) Rasmus Falk	5	0	1	6
7	DF	18	(Denmark) Mads Roerslev	0	0	4	4
8	FW	14	(Senegal) Dame N'Doye	3	0	0	3
8	FW	26	(Denmark) Carlo Holse	1	2	0	3
8	DF	3	(Sweden) Pierre Bengtsson	3	0	0	3
11	FW	28	(Cyprus) Pieros Sotiriou	2	0	0	2
11	MF	8	(Denmark) Nicolaj Thomsen	1	0	1	2
12	DF	4	(Sweden) Sotirios Papagiannopoulos	0	0	1	1
12	DF	5	(Denmark) Andreas Bjelland	1	0	0	1
12	MF	10	(Greece) Zeca	1	0	0	1
12	MF	6	(Denmark) Kvist	1	0	0	1
TOTALS				58	2	9	69

=== Clean Sheets ===
As of 25 May 2019

This includes all competitive matches.

Rnk	Pos	No.	Player	Superliga	Sydbank Pokalen	UEFA Europa League	Total
1	GK	21	(Finland) Jesse Joronen	14	0	2	16
2	GK	1	(Denmark) Stephan Andersen	1	1	4	6
TOTALS				15	1	6	22

=== Disciplinary record ===
As of 25 May 2019

This includes all competitive matches.

Rnk	Pos.	No.	Player	Superliga		Sydbank Pokalen		UEFA Europa League		Total	
Rnk	Pos.	No.	Player	Booked	Sent off (straight red)	Booked	Sent off (straight red)	Booked	Sent off (straight red)	Booked	Sent off (straight red)
1	MF	10	(Greece) (Portugal) Zeca	5	0	0	0	3	1	8	1
2	DF	22	(Denmark) Peter Ankersen	4	0	0	0	2	0	6	0
2	DF	5	(Denmark) Andreas Bjelland	5	0	0	0	1	0	6	0
2	DF	19	(Slovakia) Denis Vavro	4	0	0	0	2	0	6	0
5	MF	33	(Denmark) Rasmus Falk	5	0	0	0	2	0	5	0
5	FW	14	(Senegal) Dame N'Doye	1	0	0	0	4	0	5	0
5	GK	21	(Finland) Jesse Joronen	4	0	0	0	1	0	5	0
8	MF	29	(Denmark) Robert Skov	1	0	1	0	2	0	4	0
8	FW	28	(Cyprus) Pieros Sotiriou	2	0	0	0	2	0	4	0
8	MF	6	(Denmark) William Kvist	2	0	0	0	2	0	4	0
8	MF	7	(Denmark) Viktor Fischer	4	0	0	0	0	0	4	0
12	DF	4	(Sweden) Sotirios Papagiannopoulos	0	0	0	0	3	0	3	0
12	MF	16	(Slovakia) Ján Greguš	2	0	0	0	1	0	3	0
12	DF	20	(Denmark) Nicolai Boilesen	2	0	0	0	1	0	3	0
12	FW	23	(Denmark) Jonas Wind	2	1	0	0	0	0	2	1
12	MF	8	(Denmark) Nicolaj Thomsen	2	0	0	0	1	0	3	0
17	FW	11	(Bosnia and Herzegovina) Kenan Kodro	0	0	0	0	2	0	2	0
18	DF	3	(Sweden) Pierre Bengtsson	1	0	0	0	0	0	1	0
18	DF	2	(Spain) (Argentina) Guillermo Varela	1	0	0	0	0	0	1	0
TOTALS				47	1	1	0	29	1	77	2

== Awards ==
=== Team ===
Award	Month	Source

=== Individual ===
No.	Player	Award	Month	Source
7	Viktor Fischer	Player of the Month	July	www.superliga.dk
7	Viktor Fischer	Team of the Month	July	www.superliga.dk
14	Dame N'Doye	Team of the Month	July	www.superliga.dk
29	Robert Skov	Team of the Month	July	www.superliga.dk
14	Dame N'Doye	Player of the Month	August	www.superliga.dk
7	Viktor Fischer	Team of the Month	August	www.superliga.dk
14	Dame N'Doye	Team of the Month	August	www.superliga.dk
29	Robert Skov	Team of the Month	September	www.superliga.dk
29	Robert Skov	Player of the Month	October	www.superliga.dk
29	Robert Skov	Team of the Month	October	www.superliga.dk
5	Andreas Bjelland	Team of the Month	October	www.superliga.dk
20	Nicolai Boilesen	Team of the Month	October	www.superliga.dk
29	Robert Skov	Player of the Month	November	www.superliga.dk
29	Robert Skov	Team of the Month	November	www.superliga.dk
29	Robert Skov	Team of the Month	February	www.superliga.dk
33	Rasmus Falk	Team of the Month	February	www.superliga.dk
29	Robert Skov	Team of the Month	March	www.superliga.dk
22	Peter Ankersen	Team of the Month	March	www.superliga.dk
14	Dame N'Doye	Player of the Month	April	www.superliga.dk
14	Dame N'Doye	Team of the Month	April	www.superliga.dk
29	Robert Skov	Team of the Month	April	www.superliga.dk
5	Andreas Bjelland	Team of the Month	April	www.superliga.dk
29	Robert Skov	Team of the Month	May	www.superliga.dk
