= Viktor Fischer =

Danish footballer (born 1994)

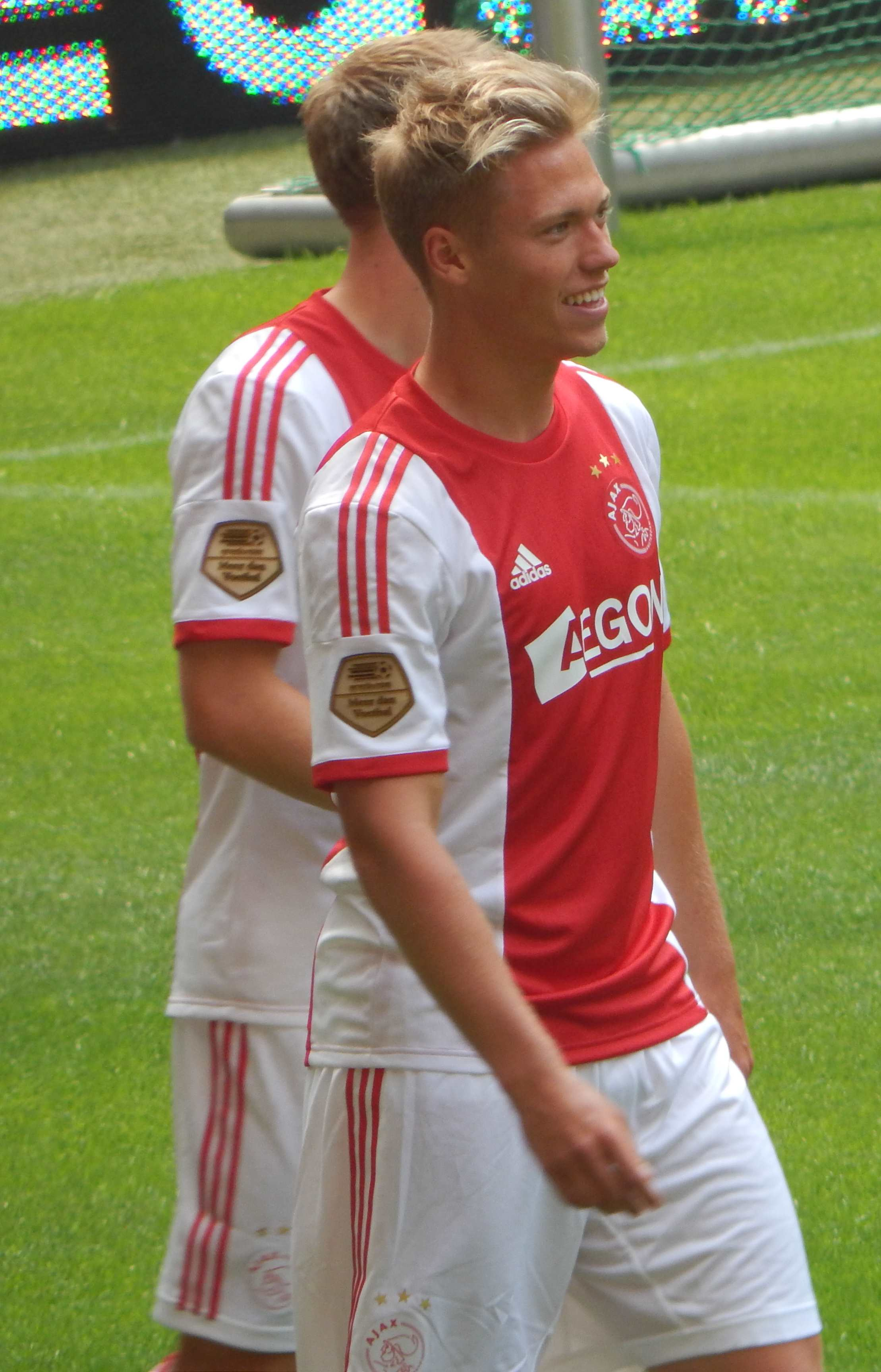
- Fischer with Ajax in 2013

Personal information
- Full name: Viktor Gorridsen Fischer
- Date of birth: 9 June 1994 (age 32)
- Place of birth: Copenhagen, Denmark
- Height: 1.81 m (5 ft 11 in)
- Positions: Attacking midfielder; winger

Youth career
- 1999–2004: IF Lyseng
- 2004–2009: AGF
- 2009–2011: Midtjylland
- 2011–2012: Ajax

Senior career*
| Years | Team | Apps | (Gls) |
| 2012–2016 | Ajax | 79 | (24) |
| 2015–2016 | Jong Ajax | 10 | (2) |
| 2016–2017 | Middlesbrough | 13 | (0) |
| 2017–2018 | Mainz 05 | 10 | (0) |
| 2018–2021 | Copenhagen | 89 | (21) |
| 2021–2023 | Antwerp | 25 | (3) |
| 2023 | → AIK (loan) | 8 | (0) |
| Total | | 234 | (50) |

International career
| 2008–2010 | Denmark U16 | 10 | (4) |
| 2009–2011 | Denmark U17 | 30 | (20) |
| 2011–2012 | Denmark U19 | 6 | (3) |
| 2012–2016 | Denmark U21 | 7 | (2) |
| 2012–2018 | Denmark | 21 | (3) |
- * Club domestic league appearances and goals

Viktor Gorridsen Fischer (born 9 June 1994) is a Danish former professional footballer who played as an attacking midfielder or winger for clubs such as Ajax and Copenhagen as well as for the Denmark national team.

Widely considered among the most promising young footballers in world football during his time at Ajax, his career was hindered by persistent injury problems, which prompted his retirement from football at the age of 29.

== Club career ==
=== Ajax ===
After playing in the youth ranks for IF Lyseng. He then decided in 2004 to move to AGF and then later FC Midtjylland in his native Denmark, Fischer joined the youth of AFC Ajax, where he played for the A1 selection in his first year with the Amsterdam side, having signed a three-year contract, binding him to the club until 30 June 2014. He had attracted interest from other clubs as well, such as Chelsea, Inter Milan, Manchester City and Manchester United due to his performance for Denmark in the U17 World Cup, but decided to sign with Ajax instead.

In his first season with Ajax, Fischer played for the Ajax A1 youth squad, helping his team to the finals of the NextGen Series, the Champions League equivalent for under-20 youth squads. Ajax would eventually lose the final to Inter Milan 5–3 on penalties, when the match ended 1–1 after extra time, finishing the tournament as runners-up. Fischer also finished as joint top scorer of the competition with 7 goals, together with Cameroonian youth International Jean Marie Dongou from FC Barcelona.

Fischer made his debut for the Ajax first team in the 2012–13 pre-season, in a win against SV Huizen, defeating the Huizen side 3–1, scoring his first goal in the 63rd minute. He made his Eredivisie debut on 20 October 2012 as a substitute in the 84th minute of a match against Heracles Almelo which ended in a 3–3 draw. He scored his first goal in a regular season for Ajax on 31 October 2012 starting the match against ONS Sneek in the KNVB Cup making it 1–0 in the 74th minute in the 2–0 win.

His Champions League debut was in the group D fixture of the 2012–13 UEFA Champions League series on 6 November 2012, in an away match against Manchester City, which ended in a 2–2 draw, coming in as an 87th-minute substitute for Christian Poulsen, making his continental debut at the top flight, at the age of 18 years. Having started in the Dutch Super Cup match against PSV on 5 August 2012, and a Dutch Cup match against ONS Sneek on 31 October 2012, Fischer played in the starting lineup of Ajax in an Eredivisie match for the first time on 11 November 2012, against PEC Zwolle, scoring twice and helping his side to a 4–2 away win.

On 20 January 2013, Fischer played in his first Klassieker match against arch-rivals Feyenoord from Rotterdam, starting on the left wing, he earned himself the man of the match award after scoring the first two goals in the first half of the match. His first goal in the 7th minute saw Fischer attacking from the left, and dribbling past the last defender and the keeper to score on the empty goal, while his second goal in the 40th minute came from the right side of the box, after he stripped the ball from Feyenoord defender Joris Mathijsen and volleyed it into the back of the net, Ajax went into halftime up by two goals. He was substituted in the 61st minute for Ryan Babel, with the match ending 3–0 for the Amsterdam side, in what would be the club's 50th all time victory over Feyenoord at home in Eredivisie history.

On 18 February 2013, it was announced by Frank de Boer in De Telegraaf, that Viktor Fischer had extended his contract with Ajax until 2017.

On 5 May 2013, Fischer contributed a goal in the 68th minute to a 5–0 victory at home against Willem II, which secured the top position in the Eredivisie table, and thus the club's third consecutive national title and 32nd overall. Later that same day, Fischer was announced as AFC Ajax Talent of the Year for his outstanding debut season, during which he emerged as Frank de Boer's first choice on the left wing and which saw him find the back of the net ten times, scoring twelve goals in all competitions all together.

The 2013–14 season began with Fischer scoring his first goal in a pre-season friendly match against De Graafschap on 13 July 2013 with the match ending a 3–0 win for Ajax in Doetinchem. The season officially kicked off on 27 July 2013 with the Dutch Super Cup (Johan Cruyff Shield) which would see Dutch Cup winners AZ face-off against league champions Ajax at the Amsterdam Arena. Fischer played the full match on the left wing, as Ajax defeated AZ 3–2 after extra time, earning the 8th overall Dutch Super Cup trophy for the club. He scored his first Eredivisie goal for Ajax in the season opener against Roda JC Kerkrade scoring the final goal in the 83' minute, in the 3–0 win in Amsterdam.

On 22 January 2014, Ajax played archrivals Feyenoord in the Quarter-finals of the KNVB Cup. After having conceded the first goal in the 7th minute of the match, Fischer stripped the ball from Feyenoord defender Joris Mathijsen once more and volleyed it into the net much like he did a season prior, tying the match and helping his side to a 3–1 victory and placement in the Semi-finals of the Dutch Cup. Fischer suffered an injury to his hamstring on 24 February 2014 in a 4–0 win against AZ.

On 22 April 2014, it was announced that Fischer would undergo surgery in Gothenburg, Sweden, and would not return to the pitch until 2015. Ajax finished the season winning their fourth consecutive Eredivisie title, and as Dutch Super Cup winners, with Fischer having made 35 appearances in all competitions, while scoring 7 goals in total (4 goals in the KNVB Cup).

Fischer was sidelined for the majority of the 2014–15 season, recovering from a hamstring injury he had obtained during the previous season. He made his return playing in the Eerste Divisie for the reserves team Jong Ajax, debuting on 21 March 2015 in a 3–0 away loss to De Graafschap. Two days later he scored his first goal, while playing for the reserves team in a friendly match against Borussia Dortmund U-23. He scored the opening goal in the 12th minute of the 4–3 loss in Dortmund. On 3 April 2015, he scored his first Eerste Divisie goal in the 52nd minute of a 2–1 away loss to FC Eindhoven. After four appearances in the Dutch second division, Fischer returned to the first team on 19 April 2015, coming on in the second half for Kolbeinn Sigþórsson in a 0–0 draw with NAC Breda at home.

Fischer began the season as Frank de Boer's first choice on the right wing, where he eventually lost his starting position to Amin Younes. On 26 January 2016, Fischer made his 100th appearance for Ajax, becoming the 159th Ajax player to join the Club van 100. Throughout the season, Fischer saw less playing time for the first team, which resulted in him playing several matches for the reserves team in the Eerste Divisie. The season took a dramatic turn on the final match day when Ajax drew against De Graafschap, and were surpassed by rivals PSV by points, thus losing the title to their rivals. A few weeks later Fischer expressed his desire to find another club.

=== Middlesbrough ===
On 26 May 2016, Fischer signed a four-year deal with newly promoted Premier League team Middlesbrough, after a €5 million transfer fee was agreed between the Teesside-based side and Fischer's previous club Ajax. He thus became manager Aitor Karanka's first ever Premier League signing, and the club's first top tier signing since Marlon King joined the club on loan from Wigan Athletic in January 2009. Fischer made his unofficial debut for the club in a 2–0 away victory over Doncaster Rovers on 16 July 2016, as part of the side's pre-season friendly matches. The player scored his first and only goal for the boro in a 3–1 pre-season friendly win over Aston Villa at Villa Park, which took place on 30 July 2016.

Fischer made his first Premier League appearance with the club, coming on as a substitute, in a goalless draw against West Bromwich Albion on 28 August 2016. After a poor run of results, the club dropped into relegation zone on 4 March 2017, following a 2–0 away defeat to Stoke City, which subsequently lead to Karanka being dismissed later that month. After a 3–0 away defeat to divisional champions Chelsea, the club's immediate relegation to the EFL Championship was confirmed, after just one season back in the Premier League. Fischer's first and only season with Middlesbrough was a bitter one, he failed to score a Premier League goal in the brief 13 appearances he made; it was clear that he was not a favourite with Middlesbrough, especially when it came to the team selections.

=== Mainz 05 ===
After the relegation of Middlesbrough from the Premier League, it was clear that Fischer's future at the newly relegated second-tier club was in significant doubt, and on 28 June 2017, the Danish international signed a four-year contract with Bundesliga team Mainz 05, joining the German club for an undisclosed transfer fee, reported to be in the region of €3 million. Fischer made his Bundesliga debut on 19 August 2017, in their narrow 1–0 defeat to Hannover 96.

For the second time in his career, Fischer's early days for his new club was a sour note, he failed to score in 10 league appearances, though did manage to bag in two goals in two appearances in DFB-Pokal, before leaving the club after just six months in Germany.

=== Copenhagen ===
On 31 January 2018, Fischer returned to his home nation, after leaving Ajax eighteen months earlier, signing for defending champions Copenhagen. He signed a four-and-a-half-year contract, after an undisclosed transfer fee, reported to be in the region of €2.7 million, was agreed between Copenhagen and Fischer's previous side Mainz 05. The Danish winger soon returned to the form he held with Ajax before his departure for England in 2016, scoring 6 goals in 12 league appearances; his performances lead to him being included in the 35-man squad for Denmark in the 2018 FIFA World Cup, and subsequently winning the Danish Superliga player of the month award for July 2018.

As the 2018–19 season began, Fischer continued to excel for Copenhagen, scoring several goals in his first 13 league appearances, which contributed to take his side to the top of the Danish Superliga table, and took him to the joint-fourth top goal scorer in the division, sharing alongside Paul Onuachu and Andreas Skov Olsen, by 29 October 2018.

=== Royal Antwerp ===
On 30 July 2021, it was announced that Fischer was transferred to Antwerp, competing in the Belgian First Division A.

==== Loan to AIK ====
On 3 February 2023, Fischer joined AIK on loan until the end of 2023. On 29 June 2023, AIK announced the loan was terminated, and Antwerp announced he was ending his career due to injuries.

== International career ==
=== Youth ===
Fischer represented Denmark at U16, U17, U19 and U21 level. While playing for the U17 squad, he was able to score 20 goals in 30 matches. He was also a part of the Danish U17 squad that made it to the semi-final of the U17 European championship 2011, before bowing out to Germany in a 0–2 loss.

=== Senior ===
On 14 November 2012, Fischer made his senior debut, when he came on as a substitute for Michael Krohn-Dehli in a 1–1 draw in a friendly against Turkey. On 8 June 2015, he again came on as a sub for Krohn-Dehli, and scored the winning penalty goal in the 85th minute, of a 2–1 friendly victory over Montenegro.

In June 2018 he was named in Denmark's squad for the 2018 FIFA World Cup in Russia.

== Personal life ==
Fischer is the grandson of Danish former footballer Poul Pedersen. Like his grandfather, Fischer plays on the wing. While his grandfather played on the right wing, he prefers to play on the left.

== Career statistics ==
=== Club ===
Appearances and goals by club, season and competition
| Club | Season | League | | | National cup (Note: Includes KNVB Cup, FA Cup, DFB-Pokal, Danish Cup, Svenska Cupen) | | Europe | | Other | | Total | |
| Club | Season | Division | Apps | Goals | Apps | Goals | Apps | Goals | Apps | Goals | Apps | Goals |
|---|---|---|---|---|---|---|---|---|---|---|---|---|
| Ajax | 2012–13 | Eredivisie | 23 | 10 | 4 | 2 | 5 (Note: Three appearances in UEFA Champions League, two appearances in UEFA Europa League) | 0 | 1 (Note: Appearance in Johan Cruijff Shield) | 0 | 33 | 12 |
| Ajax | 2013–14 | Eredivisie | 24 | 3 | 4 | 4 | 6 (Note: Five appearances in UEFA Champions League, one appearance in UEFA Europa League) | 0 | 1 | 0 | 35 | 7 |
| Ajax | 2014–15 | Eredivisie | 4 | 3 | 0 | 0 | 0 | 0 | 0 | 0 | 4 | 3 |
| Ajax | 2015–16 | Eredivisie | 28 | 8 | 2 | 1 | 9 (Note: Two appearances in UEFA Champions League, seven appearances and two goals in UEFA Europa League) | 2 | 0 | 0 | 39 | 11 |
| Ajax | Total | | 79 | 24 | 10 | 7 | 20 | 2 | 2 | 0 | 111 | 33 |
| Jong Ajax | 2014–15 | Eerste Divisie | 4 | 1 | – | | – | | – | | 4 | 1 |
| Jong Ajax | 2015–16 | Eerste Divisie | 6 | 1 | – | | – | | – | | 6 | 1 |
| Jong Ajax | Total | | 10 | 2 | – | | – | | – | | 10 | 2 |
| Middlesbrough | 2016–17 | Premier League | 13 | 0 | 2 | 0 | — | | 1 (Note: Appearance in EFL Cup) | 0 | 16 | 0 |
| Mainz 05 | 2017–18 | Bundesliga | 10 | 0 | 2 | 2 | — | | — | | 12 | 2 |
| Copenhagen | 2017–18 | Danish Superliga | 17 | 6 | 1 | 0 | 2 (Note: Appearances in UEFA Europa League) | 1 | 1 | 1 | 21 | 8 |
| Copenhagen | 2018–19 | Danish Superliga | 25 | 9 | 0 | 0 | 9 | 2 | 0 | 0 | 34 | 11 |
| Copenhagen | 2019–20 | Danish Superliga | 20 | 2 | 2 | 1 | 11 (Note: Three appearances in UEFA Champions League, eight appearances and one goal in UEFA Europa League) | 1 | 0 | 0 | 33 | 4 |
| Copenhagen | 2020–21 | Danish Superliga | 27 | 4 | 1 | 2 | 3 | 0 | – | | 31 | 6 |
| Copenhagen | 2021–22 | Danish Superliga | 0 | 0 | 0 | 0 | 1 (Note: Appearances in UEFA Europa Conference League) | 0 | – | | 1 | 0 |
| Copenhagen | Total | | 89 | 21 | 4 | 3 | 26 | 4 | 1 | 1 | 120 | 29 |
| Antwerp | 2021–22 | Belgian Pro League | 18 | 3 | 0 | 0 | 6 | 0 | — | | 24 | 3 |
| Antwerp | 2022–23 | Belgian Pro League | 7 | 0 | 2 | 0 | 3 | 0 | – | | 12 | 0 |
| Antwerp | Total | | 25 | 3 | 2 | 0 | 9 | 0 | – | | 36 | 3 |
| AIK Fotboll (loan) | 2023 | Allsvenskan | 8 | 0 | 4 | 2 | — | | — | | 12 | 2 |
| Career total | | | 234 | 50 | 24 | 14 | 55 | 6 | 4 | 1 | 317 | 71 |

=== International ===
Appearances and goals by national team and year
| National team | Year | Apps | Goals |
|---|---|---|---|
| Denmark | 2012 | 1 | 0 |
| Denmark | 2013 | 5 | 0 |
| Denmark | 2014 | 0 | 0 |
| Denmark | 2015 | 2 | 1 |
| Denmark | 2016 | 7 | 2 |
| Denmark | 2017 | 1 | 0 |
| Denmark | 2018 | 5 | 0 |
| Total | | 21 | 3 |

Scores and results list Denmark's goal tally first, score column indicates score after each Fischer goal.

List of international goals scored by Viktor Fischer
| No. | Date | Venue | Opponent | Score | Result | Competition |
|---|---|---|---|---|---|---|
| 1 | 8 June 2015 | Viborg Stadion, Denmark | Montenegro | 2–1 | 2–1 | Friendly |
| 2 | 3 June 2016 | Toyota Stadium, Japan | Bosnia and Herzegovina | 2–0 | 2–2 (3–4 p) | 2016 Kirin Cup |
| 3 | 31 August 2016 | CASA Arena Horsens, Denmark | Liechtenstein | 4–0 | 5–0 | Friendly |

== Honours ==
Ajax

- Eredivisie: 2012–13, 2013–14
- Johan Cruijff Shield: 2013

Copenhagen

- Danish Superliga: 2018–19

Individual

- NextGen Series Top Scorer (shared with Jean Marie Dongou): 2012
- Danish Talent of the Year: 2012
- Ajax Talent of the Year: 2012–13
- Copenhagen Player of the Year: 2017–18
