= Mathias Hebo =

Danish footballer (born 1995)

Personal information
- Full name: Mathias Hebo Rasmussen
- Date of birth: 2 August 1995 (age 31)
- Place of birth: Hvidovre, Denmark
- Height: 1.90 m (6 ft 3 in)
- Position: Midfielder

Team information
- Current team: Lyngby
- Number: 8

Youth career
- Hvidovre
- 2012–2014: Nordsjælland

Senior career*
Years	Team	Apps	(Gls)
2014–2016	Nordsjælland	6	(0)
2015–2016	→ Vestsjælland (loan)	12	(0)
2016–2017	Fredericia	41	(7)
2017–2019	Lyngby	43	(7)
2019–2020	Vejle	2	(0)
2019	→ Silkeborg (loan)	12	(1)
2020–2021	Lyngby	44	(9)
2021–2024	Cracovia	40	(3)
2021	Cracovia II	1	(0)
2024–	Lyngby	38	(0)

International career
2014–2016	Denmark U20	3	(0)
2016	Denmark U21	2	(0)
- * Club domestic league appearances and goals as of 2 June 2026

Mathias Hebo Rasmussen (Danish pronunciation: [ˈhe̝ːpo]; born 2 August 1995) is a Danish professional footballer who plays as a midfielder for Danish Superliga club Lyngby.

== Club career ==
=== Nordsjælland ===
In the summer 2014, Hebo was one out of six under-19 players, who permanently was promoted to the first team squad.

On 24 September 2014, he made his professional first-team debut for Nordsjælland, when he played in a Danish Cup match against SC Egedal, who Nordsjælland lost 4–5. He made his Danish Superliga debut in a match against Randers FC on 5 October 2014, replacing Mario Tičinović in the 79th minute. In February 2015, his contract was extended until the summer 2016.

On 1 February 2016, Nordsjælland confirmed, that they had terminated Hebo's contract, because he had a deal with another unnamed club.

=== Fredericia ===
Just one day after his contract was terminated, 2 February 2016, Hebo signed with Danish 1st Division club FC Fredericia. Having finished the season with 30 league games and seven goals, he left the club.

=== Lyngby ===
On 17 June 2017, it was confirmed, that Hebo had signed a three-year contract with Lyngby Boldklub.

=== Vejle ===
In January 2019 Hebo signed with Vejle BK on a 3.5-year contract. Vejle was relegated to the Danish 1st Division for the 2019–20 season and on 27 August 2019, Hebo was loaned out to newly promoted Danish Superliga club Silkeborg IF for the rest of 2019.

=== Return to Lyngby ===
On 6 January 2020 it was confirmed, that Hebo had returned to Lyngby Boldklub on a 3,5-year contract. He suffered relegation to the Danish 1st Division with the club on 9 May 2021 after a loss to last placed AC Horsens.

=== Cracovia ===
On 11 June 2021, Hebo was sold to Polish Ekstraklasa club Cracovia, signing a three-year deal.

After an Achilles tendon injury in January 2023 that kept Hebo out for seven months, the Dane was back on the training ground in August 2023. Hebo continued to experience pain afterwards, and at the end of October 2023, the club announced that the player had returned to Denmark to undergo further examinations. In January 2024, Hebo was once again back on the training ground when he joined the Cracovia squad at a training camp in Turkey.

He left the club at the end of his contract on 30 June 2024.

=== Third stint at Lyngby ===
On 4 July 2024, Hebo re-joined Lyngby Boldklub on a three-year deal.

== Honours ==
Lyngby

- Danish 1st Division: 2025–26
