= Jeppe Brinch =

Danish footballer (born 1995)

Personal information
- Full name: Jeppe Brinch Vilhelmsen
- Date of birth: 8 May 1995 (age 31)
- Place of birth: Denmark
- Height: 1.82 m (6 ft 0 in)
- Position: Centre-back

Team information
- Current team: Fremad Amager
- Number: 16

Youth career
- 2000–2014: Esbjerg fB

Senior career*
Years	Team	Apps	(Gls)
2014–2021	Esbjerg fB	105	(0)
2021–2024	Fredericia	57	(1)
2024–	Fremad Amager	53	(2)

International career
2014	Denmark U-19	8	(0)
- * Club domestic league appearances and goals as of 3 October 2026

Jeppe Brinch Vilhelmsen (born 8 May 1995) is a Danish footballer who plays as a centre-back for Danish 2nd Division side Fremad Amager.

== Club career ==
=== Esbjerg fB ===
Brinch is a product of Esbjerg and which he joined at the age of five. He was promoted to the first team squad in the summer 2014 alongside two other U19 players.

Brinch got his debut on 26 September 2013 against Aalborg Chang in the Danish Cup, which Esbjerg won 7–1. He played his first match in the Danish Superliga on 27 July 2014 against SønderjyskE. He came on the pitch in the 59th minute, replacing Jonas Knudsen.

In December 2015, Brinch extended his contract for the rest of the season. He played 13 league matches for the club in the 2015/16 season and extended his contract once again in April 2016, this time until 2019.

=== FC Fredericia ===
On 1 September 2021, Brinch joined fellow league club, FC Fredericia, on a deal until June 2023. When the contract expired in June 2023, Brinch and Fredericia extended the agreement until June 2025.

On August 29, 2024, Fredericia confirmed that they had terminated the agreement with Brinch, as he had struggled for playing time in the team over the past year.

=== Fremad Amager ===
On transfer deadline day, August 30, 2024, Brinch moved to Danish 2nd Division side Fremad Amager. The very next day, on August 31, 2024, he made his debut in a 0–4 defeat to Middelfart Boldklub when he was substituted after 33 minutes of play. On 30 June 2026, Brinch signed a new contract with the club on a minimum one more year.
