= Nicolai Boilesen =

Danish footballer (born 1992)

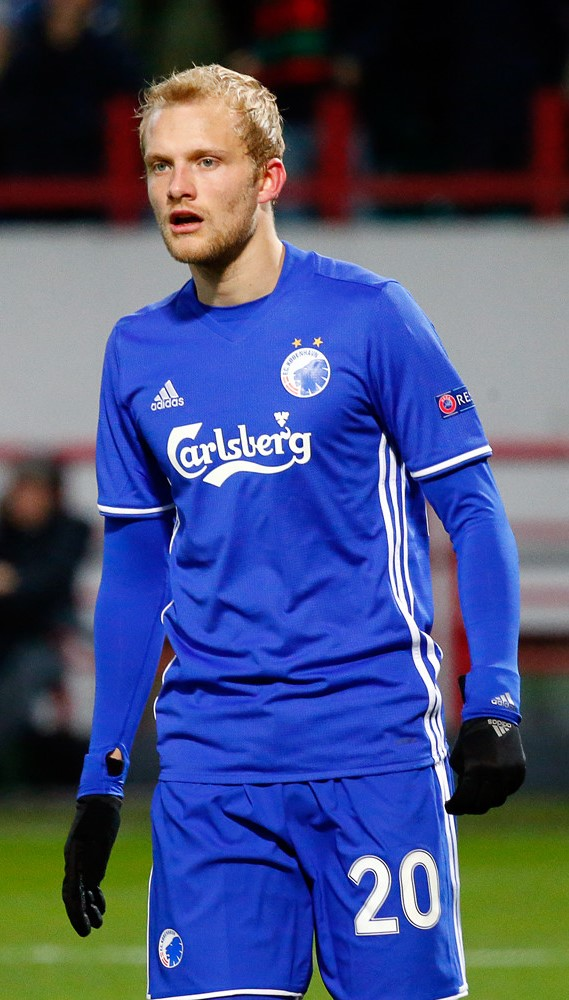
- Boilesen playing for Copenhagen in 2017

Personal information
- Full name: Nicolai Møller Boilesen
- Date of birth: 16 February 1992 (age 34)
- Place of birth: Ballerup, Denmark
- Height: 1.86 m (6 ft 1 in)
- Position: Left-back

Youth career
- Lille Hema
- –2004: Skovlunde
- 2005–2009: Brøndby
- 2009–2011: Ajax

Senior career*
Years	Team	Apps	(Gls)
2011–2016	Ajax	52	(1)
2013–2016	Jong Ajax	1	(0)
2016–2025	Copenhagen	134	(3)
Total		187	(4)

International career
2008	Denmark U16	2	(0)
2007–2009	Denmark U17	29	(2)
2009–2011	Denmark U19	16	(0)
2011–2015	Denmark U21	4	(0)
2011–2022	Denmark	22	(1)

Managerial career
- 2025–2026: Denmark U16 (assistant)
- * Club domestic league appearances and goals

Nicolai Møller Boilesen (born 16 February 1992) is a Danish former professional footballer who played as a left back.

== Club career ==
=== Ajax ===
Boilesen started playing football in local amateur clubs Lille Hema IF and Skovlunde IF in Ballerup and Skovlunde, before joining top-flight club Brøndby IF in 2004. As a left-footed central defender, Boilesen saw Danish senior international and former Brøndby player Daniel Agger as his role-model. Boilesen made his debut for the Denmark U17 national team in July 2007, and played a total 38 games for various Danish youth teams in his time at Brøndby.

Having had various trial periods with clubs such as Manchester United, Fiorentina and Chelsea, and with his Brøndby contract expiring in December 2009, Boilesen agreed a move to the Netherlands, with Ajax paying Brøndby 4 million DKK in compensation (roughly €500,000). Followed by a number of top European clubs, Boilesen chose Ajax on advice from fellow Danish youth international and Ajax player Christian Eriksen. Signing a four-year contract, binding him to the club until the Summer of 2013, he initially joined the youth ranks where his first season with Ajax was stalled by injuries. Once recovered he solidified a starting position for Ajax A1, the clubs' under-19 team, and even made appearances for the reserves team Jong Ajax.

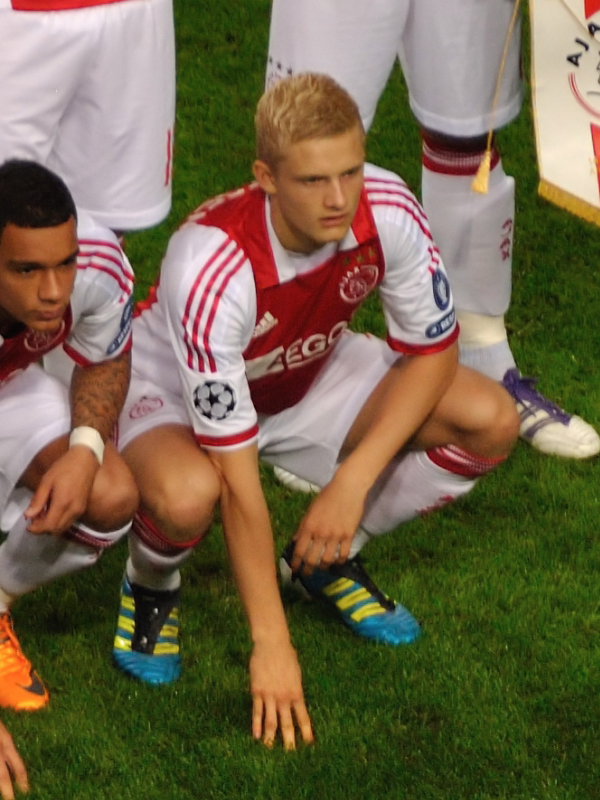
Boilesen lining up for Ajax in 2011

Boilesen joined the Ajax first team ahead of the 2010–11 season, where he was given the number 32 shirt. He made his professional debut on 3 April 2011, as he played the second half of Ajax' 3–0 victory against Heracles Almelo being substituted on for Daley Blind. By the 2011–12 season, he was head coach Frank de Boer's first choice for the starting left back position. However, in the match against rivals PSV in September 2011, Boilesen suffered a hamstring injury which would see him sidelined until February 2012, following a sprint duel with Jeremain Lens. He was not the only Ajax player to suffer an injury in this fixture as Vurnon Anita was forced off the pitch as well due to a sprained ankle. Anita's injury was less severe, and the remained of the year saw both Anita and Dico Koppers playing in the starting left back position for the duration of Boilesen's injury. He made his return playing in the Beloften Eredivisie in a match against Jong ADO Den Haag, which saw Jong Ajax win 7–0 with Boilesen playing 60 minutes and scoring a goal as well. He was then added to the first team selection for the UEFA Europa League match against Manchester United. Coming on as a substitute for Koppers he would injure his hamstring once more. Sidelined he suffered another injury during practice which would cost him the entire 2012–13 season.

On 27 July 2013, Boilesen made his return to the first team in the 2013 Johan Cruijff Schaal match against AZ, coming on for Daley Blind in the 106th minute of the 3–2 win (a.e.t.). On 8 August 2013, Boilesen played the entire match for Jong Ajax in the Eerste Divisie against FC Oss which resulted in a 2–0 loss. On 18 September 2013, Frank de Boer surprisingly put Boilesen on the left wing in the UEFA Champions League match against FC Barcelona at Camp Nou. Boilesen played the entire match which ended in a 4–0 loss. On 10 November 2013, he scored his first official goal for Ajax in the 2–0 win over N.E.C., scoring in the 28th minute, having given an assist to Siem de Jong for the 1–0 just minutes prior. Helping Ajax to a 2–1 win over FC Barcelona on the return leg of the series at the Amsterdam Arena, Boilesen was selected for the UEFA Champions League Team of the Week for matchday 5.

In June 2015 he refused to extend his contract with Ajax, as a result he did not play a single match for the team in the 2015–16 campaign. After this ended his contract expired.

=== FC Copenhagen ===
On 25 August 2016, Boilesen signed a four-year contract with FC Copenhagen, arch rivals of his childhood club Brøndby IF.

On 22 May 2025, Boilesen announced his retirement from football after the season due to injuries.

== International career ==
In May 2018 he was named in the Denmark national team's preliminary 35-man squad for the 2018 World Cup in Russia but did not make the final 23.

He was named in Denmark's 26-man squad for the UEFA Euro 2020 competition, that took place in 2021 because of the COVID-19 pandemic. Denmark played all three group matches in Parken Stadium, Copenhagen.

== Coaching career ==
After retiring, it was confirmed in July 2025, that Boilesen had been appointed assistant coach of Denmark U16. He left the position in February 2026.

== Career statistics ==
=== Club ===
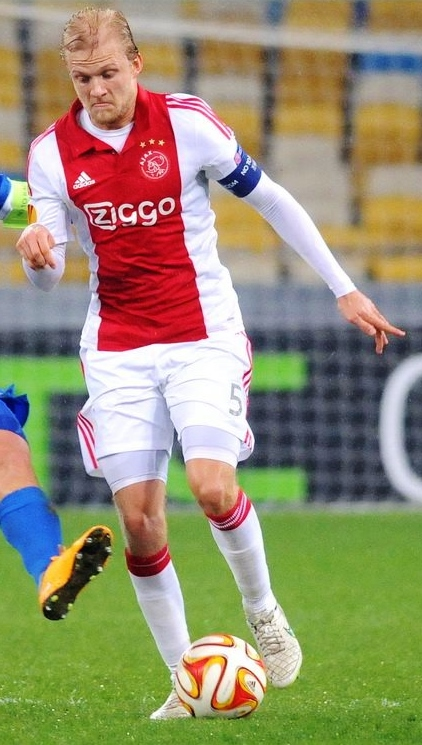
Boilesen playing for Ajax in 2015

As of 16 October 2022

Appearances and goals by club, season and competition
Club	Season	League			Cup		Europe		Other		Total	
Club	Season	Division	Apps	Goals	Apps	Goals	Apps	Goals	Apps	Goals	Apps	Goals
Ajax	2010–11	Eredivisie	6	0	1	0	0	0	0	0	7	0
Ajax	2011–12	Eredivisie	4	0	0	0	2 (Note: Appearances in UEFA Champions League)	0	1 (Note: Appearance in Johan Cruijff Shield)	0	7	0
Ajax	2012–13	Eredivisie	0	0	0	0	0	0	0	0	0	0
Ajax	2013–14	Eredivisie	20	1	3	0	4	0	1	0	28	1
Ajax	2014–15	Eredivisie	22	0	0	0	8 (Note: Appearances in UEFA Europa League)	0	0	0	30	0
Ajax	2015–16	Eredivisie	0	0	0	0	0	0	0	0	0	0
Ajax	Total		52	1	4	0	14	0	2	0	72	1
Jong Ajax	2013–14	Eerste Divisie	1	0	–		–		–		1	0
Copenhagen	2016–17	Danish Superliga	8	0	3	0	2 (Note: Appearances in UEFA Europa League)	0	0	0	13	0
Copenhagen	2017–18	Danish Superliga	31	1	2	0	7 (Note: 5 appearances in UEFA Champions League, and 2 appearances in UEFA Europa League)	0	1 (Note: Appearances in Superliga European play-offs)	0	41	1
Copenhagen	2018–19	Danish Superliga	27	1	0	0	10 (Note: Appearances in UEFA Europa League)	0	0	0	37	1
Copenhagen	2019–20	Danish Superliga	2	0	0	0	2 (Note: Appearances in UEFA Europa League)	0	0	0	4	0
Copenhagen	2020–21	Danish Superliga	26	1	1	0	0	0	0	0	27	1
Copenhagen	2021–22	Danish Superliga	26	0	1	0	12 (Note: Appearances in UEFA Europa Conference League)	0	0	0	27	0
Copenhagen	2022–23	Danish Superliga	8	0	0	0	2	0	0	0	10	0
Copenhagen	Total		128	3	7	0	35	0	1	0	159	3
Career total			181	4	11	0	49	0	3	0	232	4

=== International ===
As of match played 26 June 2021.

Appearances and goals by national team and year
National team	Year	Apps	Goals
Denmark	2011	2	0
Denmark	2012	0	0
Denmark	2013	5	1
Denmark	2014	6	0
Denmark	2015	2	0
Denmark	2016	0	0
Denmark	2017	0	0
Denmark	2018	2	0
Denmark	2019	0	0
Denmark	2020	0	0
Denmark	2021	4	0
Denmark	2022	1	0
Total		22	1

As of match played 26 June 2021. Scores and results list Denmark's goal tally first, score column indicates score after each Boilesen goal.

List of international goals scored by Nicolai Boilesen
No.	Date	Venue	Opponent	Score	Result	Competition
1	15 November 2013	MCH Arena, Herning, Denmark	Norway	2–1	2–1	Friendly

== Honours ==
Ajax

- Eredivisie: 2010–11, 2011–12, 2012–13, 2013–14
- Johan Cruijff Shield: 2013

Copenhagen

- Danish Superliga: 2016–17, 2018–19, 2021–22, 2024–25
- Danish Cup: 2016–17, 2024–25

Individual

- Danish U21 Player of the Year: 2011
