= Robert Skov =

Danish footballer (born 1996)

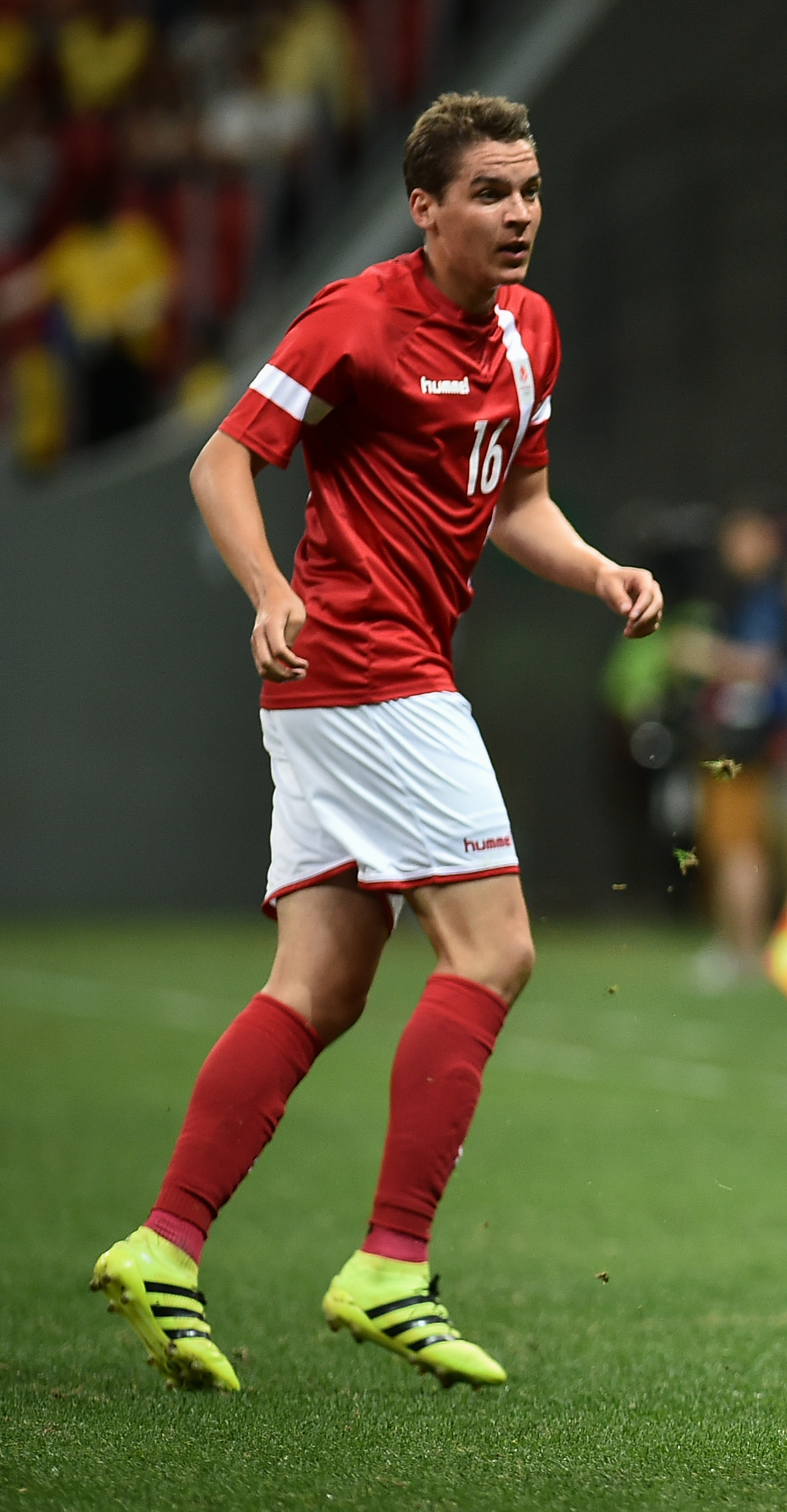
- Skov with the Denmark Olympic in 2016

Personal information
- Full name: Robert Faxe Skov
- Date of birth: 20 May 1996 (age 30)
- Place of birth: Marbella, Spain
- Height: 1.83 m (6 ft 0 in)
- Positions: Winger; wing-back

Team information
- Current team: Union Berlin
- Number: 24

Youth career
- Sejs-Svejbæk IF
- Silkeborg

Senior career*
Years	Team	Apps	(Gls)
2012–2018	Silkeborg IF	99	(21)
2018–2019	Copenhagen	54	(30)
2019–2024	TSG Hoffenheim	114	(12)
2024–	Union Berlin	19	(2)

International career
2013–2014	Denmark U18	5	(2)
2014–2015	Denmark U19	9	(2)
2016–2019	Denmark U21	25	(11)
2019–2023	Denmark	14	(7)
- * Club domestic league appearances and goals as of 11 September 2026 (UTC)

Robert Faxe Skov (Danish pronunciation: [ˈʁopʌt ˈskʌwˀ]; born 20 May 1996) is a Danish professional footballer who plays as a winger or wing-back for Bundesliga club Union Berlin. Born in Spain, he played for the Denmark national team. With 29 goals in the 2018–19 season, he broke the record set by Ebbe Sand for most goals scored in a single Danish Superliga campaign.

== Club career ==
=== Silkeborg ===
Skov came up through the youth academy at Silkeborg, making his league debut for the club on 16 May 2013 in a 1–1 home draw with Midtjylland. He came on at 16 years old, as an 81st-minute substitute for Jeppe Illum. He scored his first league goal for the club on 19 October 2014 in a 2–1 away defeat to FC Midtjylland. He scored in the 95th minute. Robert Skov played a key role in helping Silkeborg win the Danish 1st Division during the 2013/14 season, despite being only 17 years old. During the 2016–17 Danish Superliga season, Skov helped Silkeborg avoid relegation by becoming their leading scorer, by scoring 10 league goals from his position on the wing.

=== Copenhagen ===
In January 2018, Skov completed a move to Copenhagen. The deal cost FC Copenhagen around 7.5 million Danish Kroner. He made his league debut for the club on 10 February 2018 in a 5–1 home victory over Randers, playing all ninety minutes of the match. He scored his first league goal for the club a little over two weeks later, on 25 February 2018 in a 1–0 home victory over Odense BK. He scored in the 61st minute. He scored his first club hat-trick on 2 December 2018 in a 6–1 away victory over Horsens. He scored in the 23rd, 66th, and 90th minutes. Not only did Robert Skov finish as top scorer in the 2018–19 season, but he broke the all time Danish Superliga record by scoring 29 league goals, that was 7 more goals than the second placed scorers in the league. The record was previously held by Ebbe Sand who scored 28 league goals in the 1998 season. Skov was also named Danish Player of the Year for 2018. By March 2019, Skov was rumoured to Tottenham Hotspur and Arsenal after putting in outstanding performances in the Superliga.

=== TSG Hoffenheim ===
In July 2019, Skov signed a contract with TSG Hoffenheim for a transfer fee of €10 million.

Skov scored his first goal for Hoffenheim in a 3–0 Bundesliga win over SC Paderborn on 1 November 2019, opening the scoring with a fierce 25-yard free-kick inside two minutes.

On 21 May 2024, TSG Hoffenheim announced that he will leave the club after this season when his contract expires.

=== Union Berlin ===
On 4 September 2024, Skov signed with Union Berlin.

== International career ==
In July 2016, Skov was included in the Denmark squad for the 2016 Summer Olympics. He made substitute appearances in two group-stage matches, against South Africa and Brazil, alongside a substitute appearance against Nigeria in the quarterfinals. During the group stage, he scored the winning goal in Denmark's 1–0 win over South Africa in the 69th minute. That goal scored by Skov, was ultimately the goal that secured Denmark's advance to the quarter finals.

In May 2018 he was named in Denmark's preliminary 35-man squad for the 2018 World Cup in Russia. However, he did not make the final 23.

In March 2019 Skov was selected for the Denmark squad for the UEFA Euro 2020 qualifying tournament. He made his debut on 10 June 2019 in a Euro 2020 qualifier against Georgia, as a starter.

In June 2020, he was included in the national team's bid for 2020 UEFA Euro, where the team unexpectedly reached the semi-finals. He was able to represent Spain because he was born in Marbella but he chose to represent Denmark instead.

== Player profile ==
Skov is two footed, although his left foot is his main scoring weapon. He is a skilled winger who is renowned for taking on defenders and dribbling past them. He is also well known for scoring many goals and creating numerous assists. He is especially making a name for himself as a free kick specialist, by blasting in goals on a regular basis. So much that Danish international player Christian Eriksen suggested that Skov would overtake him as being the number one free kick taker for the Danish national team.

== Personal life ==
Skov's parents moved from Denmark to Spain in 1994 when his father took a job with a bank in Gibraltar, and as a result, Skov was born in Marbella. His family returned to Denmark when he was nine months old.

== Career statistics ==
=== Club ===
As of match played 11 September 2026

Appearances and goals by club, season and competition
Club	Season	League			National cup (Note: Includes Danish Cup, DFB-Pokal)		Europe		Total	
Club	Season	Division	Apps	Goals	Apps	Goals	Apps	Goals	Apps	Goals
Silkeborg	2012–13	Danish Superliga	2	0	0	0	—		2	0
Silkeborg	2013–14	Danish 1st Division	1	0	0	0	—		1	0
Silkeborg	2014–15	Danish Superliga	24	1	1	1	—		25	2
Silkeborg	2015–16	Danish 1st Division	24	6	1	0	—		25	6
Silkeborg	2016–17	Danish Superliga	29	10	2	0	—		31	10
Silkeborg	2017–18	Danish Superliga	19	4	3	1	—		22	5
Silkeborg	Total		99	21	7	2	—		106	23
Copenhagen	2017–18	Danish Superliga	18	1	1	0	2 (Note: Appearances in UEFA Europa League)	0	21	1
Copenhagen	2018–19	Danish Superliga	34	29	1	0	13	2	48	31
Copenhagen	2019–20	Danish Superliga	2	0	0	0	1 (Note: Appearance in UEFA Champions League)	1	3	1
Copenhagen	Total		54	30	2	0	16	3	72	33
TSG Hoffenheim	2019–20	Bundesliga	31	4	2	0	—		33	4
TSG Hoffenheim	2020–21	Bundesliga	23	1	1	0	6	1	30	2
TSG Hoffenheim	2021–22	Bundesliga	12	0	1	0	—		13	0
TSG Hoffenheim	2022–23	Bundesliga	23	3	2	0	—		25	3
TSG Hoffenheim	2023–24	Bundesliga	24	3	0	0	—		24	3
TSG Hoffenheim	Total		113	12	6	0	6	1	125	12
Union Berlin	2024–25	Bundesliga	15	2	1	0	—		16	2
Union Berlin	2025–26	Bundesliga	3	0	1	1	—		4	1
Union Berlin	2026–27	Bundesliga	1	0	0	0	—		1	0
Union Berlin	Total		19	2	2	1	—		21	3
Career total			285	64	17	3	22	4	324	71

=== International ===
As of match played 17 October 2023

Appearances and goals by national team and year
National team	Year	Apps	Goals
Denmark	2019	4	3
Denmark	2020	4	1
Denmark	2021	1	1
Denmark	2022	2	0
Denmark	2023	2	2
Total		14	7

As of match played 14 October 2023. Scores and results list Denmark's goal tally first.

No.	Date	Venue	Opponent	Score	Result	Competition
1.	5 September 2019	Victoria Stadium, Gibraltar	Gibraltar	1–0	6–0	UEFA Euro 2020 qualification
2.	15 November 2019	Parken Stadium, Copenhagen, Denmark	Gibraltar	1–0	6–0	UEFA Euro 2020 qualification
3.	15 November 2019	Parken Stadium, Copenhagen, Denmark	Gibraltar	4–0	6–0	UEFA Euro 2020 qualification
4.	11 October 2020	Laugardalsvöllur, Reykjavík, Iceland	Iceland	3–0	3–0	2020–21 UEFA Nations League A
5.	28 March 2021	MCH Arena, Herning, Denmark	Moldova	7–0	8–0	2022 FIFA World Cup qualification
6.	14 October 2023	Parken Stadium, Copenhagen, Denmark	Kazakhstan	2–0	3–1	UEFA Euro 2024 qualification
7.	14 October 2023	Parken Stadium, Copenhagen, Denmark	Kazakhstan	3–0	3–1	UEFA Euro 2024 qualification

== Honours ==
Silkeborg

- Danish 1st Division: 2013–14

Copenhagen

- Danish Superliga: 2018–19

Individual

- Danish Superliga Player of the Year: 2018–19
- Danish Superliga Top Scorer: 2018–19 (29 goals)
- Tipsbladet Player of the Fall: 2018
- Tipsbladet Player of the Spring: 2019
- Copenhagen Player of the Year: 2018–19
