= List of Danish football transfers winter 2024–25 =

This is a list of Danish football transfers for the 2024–25 winter transfer window. Only transfers featuring Danish Superliga and 1. Division are listed.

== Danish Superliga ==
Note: Flags indicate national team as has been defined under FIFA eligibility rules. Players may hold more than one non-FIFA nationality.

=== Midtjylland ===
In:

No.	Pos.	Nation	Player
80	MF	POR	Dani Silva (from (Italy) Hellas Verona)

Out:

No.	Pos.	Nation	Player
5	MF	URU	Emiliano Martínez (to (Brazil) Palmeiras)
8	MF	SWE	Kristoffer Olsson (retired)
17	MF	NOR	Kristoffer Askildsen (to (Norway) Viking)
25	FW	CZE	Jan Kuchta (on loan to (Czech Republic) Sparta Prague)
47	FW	DEN	Frederik Heiselberg (to (Norway) Aalesund)
53	FW	DEN	Victor Lind (to (Sweden) Brommapojkarna)
73	DF	BRA	Juninho (to (Brazil) Internacional)
—	FW	NOR	Ola Brynhildsen (on loan to (Canada) Toronto, previously on loan at (Norway) Molde)

=== Brøndby ===
In:

No.	Pos.	Nation	Player
8	MF	BIH	Benjamin Tahirović (from (Netherlands) Ajax)
13	GK	USA	Gavin Beavers (from (United States) Real Salt Lake)

Out:

No.	Pos.	Nation	Player
9	FW	NOR	Ohi Omoijuanfo (to (China) Changchun Yatai)
14	DF	DEN	Kevin Mensah (free agent)
18	DF	DEN	Kevin Tshiembe (to (Norway) Vålerenga)
46	DF	USA	Justin Che (on loan to (Belgium) Patro Eisden)
—	FW	SWE	Carl Björk (on loan to B.93, previously on loan at (Sweden) Norrköping)
—	GK	DEN	Jonathan Ægidius (to Lyngby, previously on loan at Kolding)
—	MF	DEN	Bertram Kvist (to Esbjerg, previously on loan at Kolding)

=== Copenhagen ===
In:

No.	Pos.	Nation	Player
16	FW	BRA	Robert (from (Brazil) Cruzeiro, previously on loan)
41	GK	GER	Diant Ramaj (on loan from (Germany) Borussia Dortmund)

Out:

No.	Pos.	Nation	Player
9	FW	RUS	German Onugkha (on loan to Vejle)
21	GK	DEN	Theo Sander (on loan to Hvidovre)
—	MF	DEN	Noah Sahsah (to (Norway) Rosenborg, previously on loan)

=== Nordsjælland ===
In:

No.	Pos.	Nation	Player
3	DF	DEN	Tobias Salquist (from (United States) Chicago Fire)
11	FW	NOR	Gustav Wikheim (from (Sweden) Djurgården)
22	FW	GHA	Prince Amoako Junior (from (Ghana) Right to Dream)

Out:

No.	Pos.	Nation	Player
5	DF	SWE	Daniel Svensson (on loan to (Germany) Borussia Dortmund)
6	MF	DEN	Jeppe Tverskov (to (United States) San Diego)
7	FW	DEN	Marcus Ingvartsen (to (United States) San Diego)
11	FW	DEN	Mads Hansen (to (Norway) Brann)
19	DF	DEN	Lucas Hey (to (Belgium) Anderlecht)
37	FW	ENG	Alex Mighten (loan return to (United States) San Diego)
—	GK	DEN	Andreas Gülstorff (to (Norway) Jerv, previously on loan at (Norway) Aalesund)
—	MF	DEN	Magnus Munck (to Vendsyssel, previously on loan at (Belgium) RSCA Futures)

=== AGF ===
In:

No.	Pos.	Nation	Player

Out:

No.	Pos.	Nation	Player
4	DF	DEN	Tobias Anker (to (Sweden) Sirius)
13	GK	NOR	Kristoffer Klaesson (to (Norway) Viking)
18	FW	GHA	Richmond Gyamfi (on loan to Hobro)
24	DF	DEN	Aksel Halsgaard (on loan to Roskilde)
25	DF	DEN	Mikkel Kannegaard (to Hobro)
28	DF	DEN	Luka Callø (on loan to Kolding)
—	MF	DEN	Mathias Sauer (on loan to (Norway) Egersund, previously on loan at (Norway) Haugesund)

=== Silkeborg ===
In:

No.	Pos.	Nation	Player
14	MF	DEN	Sofus Berger (from Viborg)

Out:

No.	Pos.	Nation	Player
5	DF	PER	Oliver Sonne (to (England) Burnley)
15	DF	DEN	Rasmus Thelander (to Lyngby)
—	DF	DEN	Anders Dahl (to Fredericia, previously on loan)

=== Randers ===
In:

No.	Pos.	Nation	Player
5	DF	AUS	Oliver Jones (from (Australia) Macarthur)
11	MF	FRA	Elies Mahmoud (from (Switzerland) Stade Lausanne Ouchy)
19	FW	AUS	Musa Toure (from (France) Clermont)

Out:

No.	Pos.	Nation	Player
5	DF	SWE	Hugo Andersson (to (Sweden) Värnamo)
11	FW	ARM	Edgar Babayan (retired)
19	FW	DEN	Tammer Bany (to (England) West Bromwich Albion)
29	DF	SWE	Oliver Zandén (loan return to (France) Toulouse)
—	FW	GHA	Ernest Agyiri (on loan to (Estonia) Levadia, previously on loan at Kolding)
—	FW	NGA	Mustapha Isah (to (Norway) Kristiansund, previously on loan at (Norway) Start)

=== Viborg ===
In:

No.	Pos.	Nation	Player
3	DF	SWE	Elias Andersson (on loan from (Poland) Lech Poznań)
15	MF	DEN	Asker Beck (from Kolding)
26	DF	DEN	Hjalte Bidstrup (from Copenhagen youth)
27	FW	FRA	Yonis Njoh (on loan from (France) Pau)

Out:

No.	Pos.	Nation	Player
4	DF	SUI	Nicolas Bürgy (to OB)
20	GK	DEN	Kasper Kiilerich (on loan to Aarhus Fremad)
21	MF	DEN	Sofus Berger (to Silkeborg)
28	MF	DEN	Magnus Westergaard (to (England) Wycombe Wanderers)
—	DF	SVN	Anel Zulić (on loan to (Slovenia) Koper, previously on loan at (Slovenia) Mura)
—	FW	CUW	Nigel Thomas (on loan to (Portugal) Académico de Viseu, previously on loan at (Portugal) Nacional)

=== Vejle ===
In:

No.	Pos.	Nation	Player
9	FW	NED	Jelle Duin (from (Israel) Hapoel Jerusalem)
45	FW	RUS	German Onugkha (on loan from Copenhagen)

Out:

No.	Pos.	Nation	Player
4	DF	DEN	Oliver Provstgaard (to (Italy) Lazio)
15	MF	GHA	Ebenezer Ofori (free agent)
30	MF	DEN	Oliver Amby (to Skive)

=== Lyngby ===
In:

No.	Pos.	Nation	Player
2	DF	DEN	Oskar Buur (free agent)
6	DF	DEN	Rasmus Thelander (from Silkeborg)
18	FW	DEN	Jesper Cornelius (from Hobro)
23	DF	SWE	Adam Andersson (from (Norway) Rosenborg)
40	GK	DEN	Jonathan Ægidius (from Brøndby, previously on loan at Kolding)

Out:

No.	Pos.	Nation	Player
6	DF	DEN	Andreas Bjelland (retired)
7	DF	GHA	Willy Kumado (to (United States) San Diego)
10	MF	DEN	Rezan Corlu (to (Norway) Kristiansund)
23	DF	DEN	Pascal Gregor (to (Sweden) Halmstad)
33	MF	GHA	Enock Otoo (to (Estonia) Levadia)
40	GK	DEN	David Jensen (retired)

=== Sønderjyske ===
In:

No.	Pos.	Nation	Player
2	DF	DEN	Matti Olsen (from Hvidovre)
14	FW	USA	Matthew Hoppe (from (England) Middlesbrough)
16	GK	DEN	Marcus Bundgaard (from (Sweden) Elfsborg)
27	GK	DEN	Benicio Peña (on loan from Aarhus Fremad)

Out:

No.	Pos.	Nation	Player
16	GK	DEN	Jakob Busk (on loan to (Germany) TSG Hoffenheim)
18	MF	MKD	Ivan Nikolov (on loan to Vendsyssel)
21	DF	HAI	Jeppe Simonsen (to Fremad Amager)
28	MF	TUR	Hamza Akman (to (Turkey) Eyüpspor)
29	FW	DEN	Mikkel Hyllegaard (to (Faroe Islands) 07 Vestur)
—	FW	DEN	Mikkel Ladefoged (to (Sweden) Västerås, previously on loan at Esbjerg)

=== AaB ===
In:

No.	Pos.	Nation	Player
8	MF	SWE	Melker Widell (on loan from (Wales) Swansea City)
19	FW	GER	Aaron Seydel (free agent)
23	MF	NOR	Isak Hansen-Aarøen (on loan from (Germany) Werder Bremen)
26	MF	NOR	Travis Hernes (on loan from (England) Newcastle United)
33	DF	SWE	Elison Makolli (from (Sweden) Malmö)

Out:

No.	Pos.	Nation	Player
3	DF	DEN	Sebastian Otoa (to (Italy) Genoa)
7	MF	ENG	Jubril Adedeji (on loan to (Norway) Lillestrøm)
8	MF	SWE	Melker Widell (to (Wales) Swansea City)
15	DF	ESP	Diego Caballo (to (Spain) CF Intercity)
19	FW	AUS	John Iredale (to (South Korea) Seoul E-Land)
35	DF	GHA	Eugene Amankwah (on loan to Thisted)
—	MF	SWE	Daniel Ask (to (Sweden) Öster, previously on loan at (Sweden) Västerås)

== 1. Division ==
Note: Flags indicate national team as has been defined under FIFA eligibility rules. Players may hold more than one non-FIFA nationality.

=== OB ===
In:

No.	Pos.	Nation	Player
3	DF	DEN	Adam Sørensen (from (Norway) Bodø/Glimt)
25	DF	SUI	Nicolas Bürgy (from Viborg)
31	FW	NED	Jay-Roy Grot (free agent)

Out:

No.	Pos.	Nation	Player
8	MF	GAM	Alasana Manneh (to (Scotland) Hibernian)
19	FW	SWE	Johannes Selvén (to (Sweden) Utsikten)
28	DF	DEN	Tobias Slotsager (to (Italy) Hellas Verona)
30	FW	DEN	Max Fenger (to (Sweden) Göteborg)

=== Hvidovre ===
In:

No.	Pos.	Nation	Player
1	GK	DEN	Theo Sander (on loan from Copenhagen)
4	MF	DEN	Zamir Aliji (from Frem)
42	DF	TUR	Mehmet Coşkun (from (Turkey) Şanlıurfaspor)

Out:

No.	Pos.	Nation	Player
1	GK	MNE	Filip Đukić (to Horsens)
5	DF	DEN	Matti Olsen (to Sønderjyske)
8	MF	DEN	Mathias Gehrt (retired)
20	DF	FRO	Elias Rusborg (to Næstved)

=== Kolding ===
In:

No.	Pos.	Nation	Player
1	GK	DEN	Christoffer Petersen (from (Iceland) HK)
8	MF	NOR	Mats Pedersen (from (Norway) Bodø/Glimt, previously on loan at (Norway) Mjøndalen)
10	FW	FRO	Meinhard Olsen (from (Norway) Mjøndalen)
15	FW	DEN	Joachim Rothmann (from Køge)
16	DF	DEN	Mads Bager (from (Norway) Sandnes Ulf)
20	MF	DEN	Magnus Saaby (from Næsby)
23	MF	DEN	Niels Morberg (from B.93)
30	DF	DEN	Luka Callø (on loan from AGF)

Out:

No.	Pos.	Nation	Player
1	GK	DEN	Jonathan Ægidius (loan return to Brøndby)
8	MF	DEN	Mike Vestergård (to (Norway) Sarpsborg 08)
15	DF	DEN	Christian Enemark (to Hobro)
16	MF	DEN	Asker Beck (to Viborg)
21	FW	GHA	Ernest Agyiri (loan return to Randers)
25	MF	DEN	Bertram Kvist (loan return to Brøndby)
32	DF	DEN	Jacob Vetter (free agent)

=== Hobro ===
In:

No.	Pos.	Nation	Player
5	DF	DEN	Mikkel Kannegaard (from AGF)
19	FW	GHA	Richmond Gyamfi (on loan from AGF)
—	DF	DEN	Christian Enemark (from Kolding)

Out:

No.	Pos.	Nation	Player
3	DF	DEN	Jesper Bøge (free agent)
11	MF	DEN	Mathias Kristensen (to (Norway) Aalesund)
14	FW	DEN	Jesper Cornelius (to Lyngby)
—	DF	DEN	Christian Enemark (on loan to (Sweden) Östersund)

=== Fredericia ===
In:

No.	Pos.	Nation	Player
12	DF	DEN	Svenn Crone (from (Norway) Brann)
14	DF	DEN	Anders Dahl (from Silkeborg, previously on loan)
22	FW	DEN	Martin Huldahl (from Skive)
90	GK	DEN	Valdemar Birksø (on loan from (Norway) Fredrikstad)

Out:

No.	Pos.	Nation	Player
90	GK	DEN	Valdemar Birksø (to (Norway) Fredrikstad)

=== Vendsyssel ===
In:

No.	Pos.	Nation	Player
5	DF	CMR	Hassan Ndam (from (Finland) Haka)
20	MF	MKD	Ivan Nikolov (on loan from Sønderjyske)
30	GK	SWE	Simon Andersson (from (Sweden) Hammarby TFF)
47	MF	DEN	Magnus Munck (from Nordsjælland, previously on loan at (Belgium) RSCA Futures)

Out:

No.	Pos.	Nation	Player
5	DF	DEN	Mads Greve (to Middelfart)
20	MF	DEN	Oskar Øhlenschlæger (to (Norway) Fredrikstad)
29	MF	CMR	Victor Mpindi (free agent)
34	DF	TUN	Omar Jebali (to (Norway) Start)
—	FW	ENG	Benni Smales-Braithwaite (to (England) Stalybridge Celtic, previously on loan at Skive)

=== Hillerød ===
In:

No.	Pos.	Nation	Player
11	MF	DEN	Pierre Larsen (from (Sweden) Trelleborg)
22	FW	DEN	Saman Jalaei (from Køge)
25	DF	DEN	William Glindtvad (from Copenhagen youth)
26	GK	DEN	Viggo Andersen (from Lyngby youth)

Out:

No.	Pos.	Nation	Player
18	DF	DEN	Simon Sharif (free agent)
19	FW	DEN	Donavan Bagou (to HIK)
22	DF	DEN	Frederik Karlsen (to Helsingør)
26	GK	DEN	Anton Mayland (loan return to Lyngby)

=== Horsens ===
In:

No.	Pos.	Nation	Player
13	DF	DEN	Mads Fenger (from (Sweden) Hammarby)
23	GK	MNE	Filip Đukić (from Hvidovre)
26	MF	ISL	Galdur Guðmundsson (from Copenhagen youth)

Out:

No.	Pos.	Nation	Player
19	MF	DEN	Marinus Larsen (to (Sweden) Brage)
30	GK	DEN	Andreas Hermansen (on loan to (Norway) Egersund)

=== B.93 ===
In:

No.	Pos.	Nation	Player
15	FW	SWE	Carl Björk (on loan from Brøndby, previously on loan at (Sweden) Norrköping)
30	MF	DEN	Vito Hammershøy-Mistrati (from (Sweden) Norrköping)

Out:

No.	Pos.	Nation	Player
4	DF	DEN	Jores Okore (free agent)
6	MF	DEN	Niels Morberg (to Kolding)
23	DF	DEN	Ruben Minerba (on loan to FA 2000)
26	FW	DEN	Magnus Bøttker (on loan to Nykøbing)

=== Køge ===
In:

No.	Pos.	Nation	Player
8	MF	DEN	Marc Rochester (from (Iceland) Þór Akureyri)
23	DF	DEN	Mads Westergren (from (United States) North Texas)

Out:

No.	Pos.	Nation	Player
2	DF	DEN	Marcus Gudmann (to (Sweden) Helsingborg)
8	MF	TRI	Molik Khan (loan return to (United States) Minnesota United 2)
9	FW	TUN	Youssef Dhaflaoui (free agent)
11	FW	DEN	Joachim Rothmann (to Kolding)
14	FW	USA	Patrick Weah (loan return to (United States) Minnesota United)
27	DF	NED	Michael Mulder (free agent)
30	FW	DEN	Saman Jalaei (to Hillerød)

=== Esbjerg ===
In:

No.	Pos.	Nation	Player
2	DF	DEN	Jacob Buus (free agent)
6	MF	DEN	Lasse Vigen (free agent)
9	FW	DEN	Jakob Ankersen (free agent)
19	MF	DEN	Bertram Kvist (from Brøndby, previously on loan at Kolding)
32	DF	DEN	Nicolai Blicher (from Copenhagen youth)
39	FW	DEN	Noah Strandby (from AGF youth)

Out:

No.	Pos.	Nation	Player
2	DF	DEN	Jonas Mortensen (to (Norway) Rosenborg)
6	DF	DEN	Jesper Lauridsen (retired)
9	FW	DEN	Mikkel Ladefoged (loan return to Sønderjyske)
19	MF	DEN	Nicklas Strunck (to (Norway) Bryne)
26	FW	DEN	Frederik Flaskager (free agent)
34	GK	DEN	Emil Jørgensen (on loan to Holstebro)
39	FW	DEN	Elias Andersen (to Middelfart)

=== Roskilde ===
In:

No.	Pos.	Nation	Player
1	GK	ISL	Frederik Schram (from (Iceland) Valur)
9	FW	DEN	Marius Uhd (from Næsby)
17	MF	GHA	Mohammed Iddriss (from B1913)
22	DF	DEN	Kasper Heerfordt (from (United States) Florida Atlantic Owls)
34	DF	DEN	Aksel Halsgaard (on loan from AGF)

Out:

No.	Pos.	Nation	Player
1	GK	DEN	Marco Brylov (to Nykøbing)
13	DF	DEN	William Kaastrup (free agent)
17	DF	DEN	Marc Winkel (to Frem)
22	MF	DEN	Jonas Damkjær (to HIK)
23	MF	DEN	Gustav Fraulo (loan return to Lyngby)

== See also ==
- 2024–25 Danish Superliga
- 2024–25 Danish 1st Division
