= 2023–24 F.C. Copenhagen season =

F.C. Copenhagen
2023–24 season
- Chairman: Henrik Møgelmose
- Head coach: Jacob Neestrup
- Stadium: Parken
- Danish Superliga: 3rd
- Danish Cup: Quarter-finals
- UEFA Champions League: Round of 16
- Top goalscorer: League: Mohamed Elyounoussi (10); All: Orri Óskarsson (15)
- Highest home attendance: 36,099 (8 November 2023 vs. Manchester United)
- Lowest home attendance: 14,290 (6 December 2023 vs. Silkeborg)
- Average home league attendance: 28,154 (31 May 2024)
- Biggest win: 9–0 (27 September 2023 vs. Lyseng)
- Biggest defeat: 1–3 (26 August 2023 vs. Silkeborg); 0–2 (30 September 2023 vs. Midtjylland); 0–2 (6 December 2023 vs. Silkeborg); 0–2 (1 March 2024 vs. Midtjylland); 1–3 (13 February 2024 vs. Manchester City); 1–3 (6 March 2024 vs. Manchester City)
| Home colours | Away colours | Third colours |

The 2023–24 F.C. Copenhagen season was the club's 32nd season in existence, all of which were competed in the top flight of Danish football. In addition to the domestic league, Copenhagen aimed to defend its title in this season's edition of the Danish Cup and, by virtue of winning the 2022–23 Danish Superliga championship, competed in the UEFA Champions League. The season covered the period from 1 July 2023 to 30 June 2024.

== Players ==
=== First-team squad ===
As of 1 February 2024

| No. | Player | Nationality | Position | Since | Date of birth | Signed from |
Goalkeepers
| 1 | Kamil Grabara | (Poland) | GK | 2021 | 8 January 1999 | (England) Liverpool |
| 21 | Theo Sander | (Denmark) | GK | 2023 | 8 January 2005 | (Denmark) AaB |
| 31 | Rúnar Alex Rúnarsson | (Iceland) | GK | 2024 | 18 February 1995 | (England) Arsenal |
Defenders
| 2 | Kevin Diks | (Netherlands) | RB | 2021 | 6 October 1996 | (Italy) Fiorentina |
| 3 | Denis Vavro | (Slovakia) | CB | 2022 | 10 April 1996 | (Italy) Lazio |
| 5 | Davit Khocholava | (Georgia (country)) | CB | 2021 | 8 February 1993 | (Ukraine) Shakhtar |
| 6 | Christian Sørensen | (Denmark) | LB | 2022 | 6 August 1992 | (Denmark) Viborg |
| 19 | Elias Jelert | (Denmark) | RB | 2022 | 15 June 2003 | (Denmark) Homegrown |
| 20 | Nicolai Boilesen | (Denmark) | CB | 2016 | 16 February 1992 | (Netherlands) Ajax |
| 22 | Peter Ankersen | (Denmark) | RB | 2020 | 22 September 1990 | (Italy) Genoa |
| 24 | Birger Meling | (Norway) | LB | 2023 | 17 December 1994 | (France) Rennes |
| 26 | Scott McKenna | (Scotland) | CB | 2024 | 12 November 1996 | (England) Nottingham Forest |
Midfielders
| 7 | Viktor Claesson (captain) | (Sweden) | MF | 2022 | 2 January 1992 | (Russia) Krasnodar |
| 8 | Magnus Mattsson | (Denmark) | MF | 2024 | 25 February 1999 | (Netherlands) NEC Nijmegen |
| 9 | Diogo Gonçalves | (Portugal) | MF | 2023 | 6 February 1997 | (Portugal) Benfica |
| 10 | Mohamed Elyounoussi | (Norway) | MF | 2023 | 4 August 1994 | (England) Southampton |
| 12 | Lukas Lerager | (Denmark) | MF | 2021 | 12 July 1993 | (Italy) Genoa |
| 30 | Elias Achouri | (Tunisia) (France) | MF | 2023 | 10 February 1999 | (Denmark) Viborg |
| 33 | Rasmus Falk | (Denmark) | MF | 2016 | 15 January 1992 | (Denmark) Odense |
| 36 | William Clem | (Denmark) | MF | 2022 | 20 June 2004 | (Denmark) Homegrown |
| 39 | Oscar Højlund | (Denmark) | MF | 2023 | 4 January 2005 | (Denmark) Homegrown |
| 40 | Roony Bardghji | (Sweden) | MF | 2021 | 15 November 2005 | (Denmark) Homegrown |
Forwards
| 11 | Jordan Larsson | (Sweden) | FW | 2023 | 20 June 1997 | (Germany) Schalke 04 |
| 14 | Andreas Cornelius | (Denmark) | FW | 2022 | 16 March 1993 | (Turkey) Trabzonspor |
| 15 | Khouma Babacar | (Senegal) | FW | 2022 | 17 March 1993 | (Italy) Sassuolo |
| 18 | Orri Óskarsson | (Iceland) | FW | 2022 | 29 August 2004 | (Denmark) Homegrown |
| 44 | Emil Højlund | (Denmark) | FW | 2023 | 4 January 2005 | (Denmark) Homegrown |

=== Youth players in use ===
Note: Flags indicate national team as defined under FIFA eligibility rules; some limited exceptions apply. Players may hold more than one non-FIFA nationality.

| No. | Pos. | Nation | Player |
|---|---|---|---|
| 46 | MF | DEN | Noah Sahsah (from FC Copenhagen U19) |
| 47 | MF | DEN | Victor Froholdt (from FC Copenhagen U19) |

| No. | Pos. | Nation | Player |
|---|---|---|---|
| 61 | GK | DEN | Oscar Gadeberg Buur (from FC Copenhagen U19) |

=== Out on loan ===
Note: Flags indicate national team as defined under FIFA eligibility rules; some limited exceptions apply. Players may hold more than one non-FIFA nationality.

| No. | Pos. | Nation | Player |
|---|---|---|---|
| — | GK | DEN | Andreas Dithmer (at (Netherlands) Jong Utrecht until 30 June 2024) |
| — | MF | ISL | Ísak Bergmann Jóhannesson (at (Germany) Fortuna Düsseldorf until 30 June 2024) |
| — | MF | NGR | Paul Mukairu (at (England) Reading until 30 June 2024) |

| No. | Pos. | Nation | Player |
|---|---|---|---|
| — | MF | DEN | Daniel Haarbo (at (Denmark) Aarhus Fremad until 30 June 2024) |
| — | MF | DEN | Thomas Jørgensen (at (Denmark) Hvidovre until 30 June 2024) |
| — | FW | FRA | Mamoudou Karamoko (at (Hungary) Fehérvár until 30 June 2024) |

== Transfers ==
=== In ===
| Date | Pos. | Nat. | Name | Club | Fee | Ref. |
|---|---|---|---|---|---|---|
| 1 July 2023 | FW | (Sweden) | Jordan Larsson | (Germany) Schalke 04 | €2.00m | |
| 20 July 2023 | GK | (Denmark) | Theo Sander | (Denmark) AaB | €1.075m | |
| 24 July 2023 | MF | (Tunisia) (France) | Elias Achouri | (Denmark) Viborg | €3.00m | |
| 27 July 2023 | MF | (Norway) | Mohamed Elyounoussi | (England) Southampton | Free Transfer | |
| 14 August 2023 | DF | (Norway) | Birger Meling | (France) Rennes | €2.00m | |
| 1 February 2024 | MF | (Denmark) | Magnus Mattsson | (Netherlands) NEC Nijmegen | €4.25m | |
| 1 February 2024 | GK | (Iceland) | Rúnar Alex Rúnarsson | (England) Arsenal | Free Transfer | |

=== Loans in ===
| Date | Pos. | Nat. | Name | Club | Duration | Ref. |
|---|---|---|---|---|---|---|
| 1 September 2023 | MF | (Argentina) | Mateo Tanlongo | (Portugal) Sporting CP | 10 January 2024 | |
| 30 January 2023 | DF | (Scotland) | Scott McKenna | (England) Nottingham Forest | 30 June 2024 | |

=== Out ===
| Date | Pos. | Nat. | Name | Club | Fee | Ref. |
|---|---|---|---|---|---|---|
| 1 July 2023 | FW | (Denmark) | Mikkel Kaufmann | (Germany) Union Berlin | €2.70m | |
| 1 July 2023 | MF | (Greece) | Zeca | (Greece) Panathinaikos | Free Transfer | |
| 1 July 2023 | MF | (New Zealand) | Marko Stamenić | (Serbia) Red Star Belgrade | Free Transfer | |
| 17 July 2023 | MF | (Iceland) | Hákon Arnar Haraldsson | (France) Lille | €12.00m | |
| 31 August 2023 | GK | (Sweden) | Karl-Johan Johnsson | (France) Bordeaux | Free Transfer | |
| 4 September 2023 | MF | (South Africa) | Luther Singh | (Serbia) FK Čukarički | Free Transfer | |
| 13 September 2023 | MF | (Nigeria) | Akinkunmi Amoo | (Cyprus) AC Omonia | Free Transfer | |
| 1 February 2023 | DF | (Denmark) | Valdemar Lund | (Norway) Molde | €1.50m | |

=== Loans out ===
| Date | Pos. | Nat. | Name | Club | Duration | Ref. |
|---|---|---|---|---|---|---|
| 19 July 2023 | MF | (Denmark) | Daniel Haarbo | (Denmark) Aarhus Fremad | 30 June 2024 | |
| 1 August 2023 | FW | (France) | Mamoudou Karamoko | (Hungary) Fehérvár FC | 30 June 2024 | |
| 9 August 2023 | MF | (Iceland) | Ísak Bergmann Jóhannesson | (Germany) Fortuna Düsseldorf | 30 June 2024 | |
| 16 August 2023 | MF | (Nigeria) | Paul Mukairu | (England) Reading F.C. | 30 June 2024 | |
| 30 January 2024 | MF | (Denmark) | Thomas Jørgensen | (Denmark) Hvidovre | 30 June 2024 | |
| 1 February 2024 | GK | (Denmark) | Andreas Dithmer | (Netherlands) Jong Utrecht | 30 June 2024 | |

=== New contracts ===
| Date | Pos. | Nat. | Name | Contract until | Ref. |
|---|---|---|---|---|---|
| 20 July 2023 | DF | (Denmark) | Elias Jelert | 30 June 2027 | |
| 24 May 2024 | MF | (Denmark) | Rasmus Falk | 30 June 2027 | |

== Non-competitive ==
=== Pre-season ===
Copenhagen begins pre-season training on 26 June, then leave for Scheffau am Wilden Kaiser, Austria on 7 July for two additional preseason training matches.

| 5 July 2023 | Copenhagen | 2–1 | Silkeborg | Frederiksberg |
| 13:00 CEST | E. Højlund 76'; Karamoko 89' | Report | Lind 24' | Stadium: Nummer 10; Referee: Jakob A. Sundberg |

| 11 July 2023 | Schalke 04 (Germany) | 0–2 | Copenhagen | Kufstein, Austria |
| 18:00 CEST | | Report | Lund (yellow card) 4'; Gonçalves 35'; Bardghji 39'; Diks (yellow card) 81' | Stadium: Kufstein Arena; Attendance: 1,500; Referee: Stjepan Bosnjak (Austria) |

| 14 July 2023 | Viktoria Plzeň (Czech Republic) | 3–2 | Copenhagen | Kufstein, Austria |
| 17:00 CEST | Kopic 7'; Chorý 77'; Kliment 110' | Report | Larsson 18'; Óskarsson 120' | Stadium: Kufstein Arena; Attendance: 100; Referee: Andreas Staudinger (Austria) |

| 18 July 2023 | Copenhagen | 1–1 | Næstved | Frederiksberg |
| 14:00 CEST | Henriksen 17' (o.g.) | Report | Njai 35' | Stadium: Nummer 10; Attendance: 400; Referee: Benjamin Helm Svedborg |

=== In-season Autumn ===
| 12 September 2023 | Copenhagen | 2–0 | FC Fredericia | Frederiksberg |
| 14:00 CEST | Gonçalves 26' (Cornelius); Tanlongo (yellow card) 42'; Cornelius 38' (Falk) | Report | | Stadium: Nummer 10; Attendance: 50; Referee: Iman Huseen Umar |

| 12 October 2023 | Brøndby | 2-0 | Copenhagen | Brøndbyvester |
| 12:00 CEST | Mensah 32'; Omoijuanfo 45' | Report | | Stadium: Brøndby Stadium, bane 3 Attendance: 0 |

=== Mid-season ===
| 16 January 2024 | Rangers (Scotland) | 2–2 | Copenhagen | Glasgow, Scotland |
| 21:00 CEST | Matondo 13'; Dessers 75' | Report | Diks 71'; Yfeko 80' (o.g.) | Stadium: Ibrox Stadium; Attendance: 23,779; Referee: Matthew MacDermid (Scotland) |

| 20 January 2024 | Sparta Prague (Czech Republic) | 2–0 | Copenhagen | Prague, Czech Republic |
| 15:00 CEST | Olatunji 17'; Kuchta 76' | Report | Vavro (red card) 26'; Ankersen (yellow card) 59' | Stadium: epet ARENA; Attendance: 11,011; Referee: Ladislav Szikszay (Czech Republic) |

| 27 January 2024 | Copenhagen | 5–1 | AGF | Frederiksberg |
| 14:00 CEST | Gonçalves 25' (pen.); Anker 54' (o.g.); Bardghji 88'; Froholdt 128'; E. Højlund 132' | Report | Mortensen 59' | Stadium: Nummer 10; Referee: Magnus Dilling |

=== Atlantic Cup ===
| 4 February 2024 | Elfsborg (Sweden) | 4–5 | Copenhagen | Algarve, Portugal |
| 20:00 CET | Baidoo 30', 54'; Diks 53' (o.g.); Abdulai 84' | Report | Gonçalves 3'; Elyounoussi 20', 36', 90+3'; Claesson 58' | Stadium: Estadio Algarve; Attendance: 50; Referee: Pedro Ramalho (Portugal) |

| 5 February 2024 | Brøndby | 2–1 | Copenhagen | Algarve, Portugal |
| 13:00 CET | Lauritsen 15'; Schwartau 52' | Report | Bardghji 86' | Stadium: Estadio Algarve |

| 8 February 2024 | Molde (Norway) | 1–3 | Copenhagen | Algarve, Portugal |
| 20:00 CET | Haugan 52' | Report | Elyounoussi 3' 34'; Larsson 46' | Stadium: Estadio Algarve; Attendance: 25; Referee: Flavio Lima (Portugal) |

=== In-season Spring ===
| 20 February 2024 | Copenhagen | 2-1 | Helsingør | Frederiksberg |
| 12:00 CEST | Bardghji 25'; Óskarsson 27' | Report | Bedjeti 41' | Stadium: Nummer 10; Referee: Benjamin Helm Svedborg |

| 26 March 2024 | Copenhagen | 3–2 | B.93 | Frederiksberg |
| 12:00 CEST | Larsson 51', 83'; Gonçalves 52' | Report | Erenbjerg 25'; Egeris 31' | Stadium: Nummer 10; Referee: Svend Funder |

| 22 April 2024 | Copenhagen | 3–0 | Silkeborg | Frederiksberg |
| 11:00 CEST | Claesson 10'; Froholdt 37'; Óskarsson 69' | Report | | Stadium: Nummer 10; Referee: Frida Mia Klarlund |

== Competitions ==
=== Overall record ===
| Competition | First match | Last match | Starting round | Final position | Record | | | | | | | |
| Competition | First match | Last match | Starting round | Final position | Pld | W | D | L | GF | GA | GD | Win % |
|---|---|---|---|---|---|---|---|---|---|---|---|---|
| Superliga | 22 July 2023 | 26 May 2024 | Matchday 1 | Third Place | 32 | 18 | 5 | 9 | 64 | 38 | +26 | 56.25 |
| European play-off | 31 May 2024 | 31 May 2024 | Europa Playoff | Winner | 1 | 1 | 0 | 0 | 2 | 1 | +1 | 100.00 |
| Danish Cup | 27 September 2023 | 9 December 2023 | Third Round | Quarter-finals | 4 | 3 | 0 | 1 | 12 | 3 | +9 | 75.00 |
| Champions League | 25 July 2023 | 6 March 2024 | 2nd Qualifying Round | Round of 16 | 14 | 5 | 5 | 4 | 23 | 21 | +2 | 35.71 |
| Total | | | | | 51 | 27 | 10 | 14 | 101 | 63 | +38 | 52.94 |

Last updated: 31 May 2024
Source: Soccerway

Source: Competitive matches

=== Superliga ===
==== League table ====
| Pos | Team | Pld | W | D | L | GF | GA | GD | Pts | Qualification |
|---|---|---|---|---|---|---|---|---|---|---|
| 1 | Midtjylland | 22 | 15 | 3 | 4 | 43 | 23 | +20 | 48 | Qualification for the Championship round |
| 2 | Brøndby | 22 | 14 | 5 | 3 | 44 | 20 | +24 | 47 | Qualification for the Championship round |
| 3 | Copenhagen | 22 | 14 | 3 | 5 | 45 | 23 | +22 | 45 | Qualification for the Championship round |
| 4 | Nordsjælland | 22 | 10 | 7 | 5 | 35 | 21 | +14 | 37 | Qualification for the Championship round |
| 5 | AGF | 22 | 9 | 9 | 4 | 26 | 21 | +5 | 36 | Qualification for the Championship round |

Source: Danish Football Association (in Danish), Soccerway
Rules for classification: 1) Points; 2) Goal difference; 3) Goals scored; 4) Away goals scored; 5) Play-off (played on neutral ground if determining teams for different rounds); 6) Draw.

==== Results summary ====
| Overall | | | | | | | | Home | | | | | | Away | | | | | |
| Pld | W | D | L | GF | GA | GD | Pts | W | D | L | GF | GA | GD | W | D | L | GF | GA | GD |
|---|---|---|---|---|---|---|---|---|---|---|---|---|---|---|---|---|---|---|---|
| 33 | 19 | 5 | 9 | 66 | 39 | +27 | 62 | 10 | 2 | 5 | 30 | 16 | +14 | 9 | 3 | 4 | 36 | 23 | +13 |

Last updated: 31 May 2024.
Source: FBref

==== Results by round – regular season ====
| Matchday | 1 | 2 | 3 | 4 | 5 | 6 | 7 | 8 | 9 | 10 | 11 | 12 | 13 | 14 | 15 | 16 | 17 | 18 | 19 | 20 | 21 | 22 |
|---|---|---|---|---|---|---|---|---|---|---|---|---|---|---|---|---|---|---|---|---|---|---|
| Ground | A | A | H | H | A | H | H | A | A | H | A | H | H | A | H | A | H | A | H | A | H | A |
| Result | W | W | W | W | W | L | W | D | W | L | D | W | W | W | D | L | L | W | W | L | W | W |
| Position | 3 | 3 | 2 | 2 | 1 | 2 | 1 | 1 | 1 | 1 | 2 | 1 | 1 | 1 | 1 | 1 | 3 | 2 | 2 | 3 | 3 | 3 |

Source: http://www.superliga.dk/
A = Away; H = Home; W = Win; D = Draw; L = Loss

==== Championship round ====
| Pos | Team | Pld | W | D | L | GF | GA | GD | Pts | |
|---|---|---|---|---|---|---|---|---|---|---|
| 1 | Midtjylland (C) | 32 | 19 | 6 | 7 | 62 | 43 | +19 | 63 | Qualification for the Champions League second qualifying round |
| 2 | Brøndby | 32 | 18 | 8 | 6 | 60 | 35 | +25 | 62 | Qualification for the Conference League second qualifying round |
| 3 | Copenhagen (O) | 32 | 18 | 5 | 9 | 64 | 38 | +26 | 59 | Qualification for the European play-off match |
| 4 | Nordsjælland | 32 | 16 | 10 | 6 | 60 | 34 | +26 | 58 | |
| 5 | AGF | 32 | 11 | 11 | 10 | 42 | 46 | −4 | 44 | |

Source: Danish Football Association (in Danish), Soccerway
Rules for classification: 1) Points; 2) Goal difference; 3) Goals scored; 4) Away goals scored; 5) Play-off (played on neutral ground if determining teams for different rounds); 6) Draw.
(C) Champions; (O) Play-off winners

==== Results by round - Championship round ====
| Matchday | 1 | 2 | 3 | 4 | 5 | 6 | 7 | 8 | 9 | 10 |
|---|---|---|---|---|---|---|---|---|---|---|
| Ground | H | A | A | H | H | A | A | H | A | H |
| Result | L | L | D | W | W | W | W | L | L | D |
| Position | 3 | 3 | 3 | 3 | 2 | 2 | 1 | 3 | 3 | 3 |

Updated to match(es) played on 26 May 2024. Source: http://www.superliga.dk/
A = Away; H = Home; W = Win; D = Draw; L = Loss

==== Regular season ====
| 22 July 2023 1 | Lyngby | 1–2 | Copenhagen | Lyngby |
| 16:00 CEST | Magnússon (yellow card) 45+1'; Finnbogason 71' | Report | Lund 44' (Gonçalves); Gonçalves 56' (pen.); Diks (yellow card) 74' | Stadium: Lyngby Stadium; Attendance: 9,546; Referee: Sandi Putros |

| 27 July 2023 2 | Vejle | 2–3 | Copenhagen | Vejle |
| 16:00 CEST | Albentosa 25' (Barry) (yellow card) 45+4'; Ofori (yellow card) 45'; Vavro 52' (o.g.); Provstgaard (yellow card) 68' | Report | Larsson 19' (Achouri); Sørensen (yellow card) 27'; Bardghji 34' (Sørensen) (yellow card) 37'; Gonçalves 70' (pen.) | Stadium: Vejle Stadium; Attendance: 9,753; Referee: Morten Krogh |

| 5 August 2023 3 | Copenhagen | 4–0 | Randers | Copenhagen |
| 16:00 CEST | Gonçalves 8' (Falk) 29' (pen.); Bardghji 23' (Falk); Falk (yellow card) 63'; Diks 66' (Sørensen) | Report | Andersson (yellow card) 13'; Kaastrup (yellow card) 26' | Stadium: Parken; Attendance: 25,407; Referee: Jonas Hansen |

| 12 August 2023 4 | Copenhagen | 2–1 | OB | Copenhagen |
| 19:00 CEST | Achouri (yellow card) 74' (goal) 90' (Gonçalves); Lerager 77' (Sørensen) | Report | Owusu (yellow card) 9'; Nouck 57' (Al Hajj) | Stadium: Parken; Attendance: 25,215; Referee: Jacob Karlsen |

| 18 August 2023 5 | Hvidovre | 0–2 | Copenhagen | Copenhagen |
| TBD CEST | Geertsen (yellow card) 45+4'; Iljazovski (yellow card) 90+6' | Report | Óskarsson 10' (Højlund); Elyounoussi 76' (Achouri) | Stadium: Pro Ventilation Arena; Attendance: 7,979; Referee: Morten Krogh |

| 26 August 2023 6 | Copenhagen | 1–3 | Silkeborg | Copenhagen |
| 16:00 CEST | Bardghji 4' (Elyounoussi); Jelert (yellow card) 63'; Larsson (yellow card) 84' | Report | Mattsson 45+2'; Lind 57' (Østrøm); McCowatt 72' (Klynge) | Stadium: Parken; Attendance: 23,832; Referee: Peter Kjærsgaard-Andersen |

| 3 September 2023 7 | Copenhagen | 2–0 | Viborg | Copenhagen |
| 18:00 CEST | Bardghji 8' (Jelert); Jelert (yellow card) 11'; Vavro 48' (Diks); Claesson (yellow card) 69'; Larsson (yellow card) 77' | Report | Said (yellow card) 30'; Thomas (yellow card) 51'; Mbom (yellow card) 81' | Stadium: Parken; Attendance: 23,245; Referee: Sandi Putros |

| 17 September 2023 8 | Nordsjælland | 2–2 | Copenhagen | Farum |
| 16:00 CEST | Tverskov; Frese 62' (Diomande); Rasmussen (yellow card) 90+2' | Report | Óskarsson 16' (Achouri); Jelert (yellow card) 38'; Gonçalves (yellow card) 45'; Elyounoussi 54' (Achouri); Vavro (yellow card) 83' | Stadium: Right to Dream Park; Attendance: 8,836; Referee: Jakob Kehlet |

| 24 September 2023 9 | Brøndby | 2–3 | Copenhagen | Brøndbyvester |
| 14:00 CEST | Radošević 25'; Heggheim (yellow card) 48'; Omoijuanfo 69' (Divković) | Report | Elyounoussi (yellow card) 35'; Achouri (yellow card) 41'; Gonçalves 54' (Achouri); Lund (yellow card) 82'; Bardghji 84' (Óskarsson) 89' | Stadium: Brøndby Stadium; Attendance: 25,884; Referee: Morten Krogh |

| 30 September 2023 10 | Copenhagen | 0–2 | Midtjylland | Copenhagen |
| 15:00 CEST | Falk (yellow card) 69'; Larsson (yellow card) 74'; Grabara (yellow card) 76'; Ankersen (yellow card) 82'; Lerager (yellow card) 90' | Report | Olsson (yellow card) 24'; Ingason (yellow card) 53'; Brynhildsen 63' (Sørensen); Sørensen 71' (Şimşir); Paulinho (yellow card) 74' | Stadium: Parken; Attendance: 32,032; Referee: Sandi Putros |

| 8 October 2023 11 | AGF | 1–1 | Copenhagen | Aarhus |
| 20:00 CEST | Knoester (yellow card) 32'; Serra 73' (Mortensen); Kahl (yellow card) 75'; Mortensen (yellow card) 78' | Report | Diks (yellow card) 83' (yellow-red card) 90+5'; Falk 90+3' | Stadium: Ceres Park; Attendance: 15,018; Referee: Jakob A. Sundberg |

| 21 October 2023 12 | Copenhagen | 2–1 | Vejle | Copenhagen |
| 17:00 CEST | Gonçalves (yellow card) 56'; Achouri 70' (Cornelius); Elyounoussi 82' (Sørensen) | Report | Onugkha 65' (Ezatolahi) (yellow card) 67'; Albornoz (yellow card) 83' | Stadium: Parken; Attendance: 25,288; Referee: Jacob Karlsen |

| 28 October 2023 13 | Copenhagen | 4–0 | Hvidovre | Copenhagen |
| 17:00 CEST | Lerager 1' (Elyounoussi); Claesson 12' (Lerager); Bardghji 69' (Falk); Óskarsson 88' | Report | Spelmann (yellow card) 41'; Iljazovski (yellow card) 47'; Geertsen (yellow card) 68' | Stadium: Parken; Attendance: 22,718; Referee: Aydin Uslu |

| 5 November 2023 14 | Randers | 2–4 | Copenhagen | Randers |
| 16:00 CET | Bundgaard 4' (Kallesøe); Nordli 60' (Olsen); Carlgren (yellow card) 74' | Report | Falk 7'; Claesson 66' (Achouri); Larsson 72' (Óskarsson); Achouri (yellow card) 88'; Froholdt 90+6' (Óskarsson) | Stadium: Cepheus Park Randers; Attendance: 5,559; Referee: Sandi Putros |

| 12 November 2023 15 | Copenhagen | 0–0 | Brøndby | Copenhagen |
| 12:00 CET | Vavro (yellow card) 11'; Gonçalves (yellow card) 43'; Achouri (yellow card) 90+1' | Report | Rasmussen (yellow card) 15' | Stadium: Parken; Attendance: 33,583; Referee: Mads-Kristoffer Kristoffersen |

| 25 November 2023 16 | Viborg | 2–1 | Copenhagen | Viborg |
| 19:00 CET | Ementa (yellow card) 30'; Jensen 51'; Jatta 90+2' (Jensen) | Report | Grabara (yellow card) 30'; Elyounoussi 39' (Achouri); Gonçalves (yellow card) 66' | Stadium: Viborg Stadium; Attendance: 6,661; Referee: Jakob Kehlet |

| 3 December 2023 17 | Copenhagen | 1–2 | AGF | Copenhagen |
| 18:00 CET | Boilesen (yellow card) 48'; Achouri 58'; Sørensen (yellow card) 59' | Report | Poulsen (yellow card) 1' (goal) 8' (Brandhof); Tingager 34' (Links); Kahl (yellow card) 44'; Brandhof (yellow card) 80'; Hansen (yellow card) 90+4' | Stadium: Parken; Attendance: 24,675; Referee: Sandi Putros |

| 18 February 2024 18 | Silkeborg | 0–3 | Copenhagen | Silkeborg |
| 16:00 CET | | Report | Mattsson 54' (Sørensen) (yellow card) 86'; Claesson 63'; Elyounoussi 87' (Froholdt) | Stadium: JYSK Park; Attendance: 7,350; Referee: Peter Kjærsgaard-Andersen |

| 26 February 2024 19 | Copenhagen | 2–0 | Nordsjælland | Copenhagen |
| 19:00 CET | Jelert (yellow card) 29'; Claesson 30' (Achouri); Achouri 59'; Meling (yellow card) 67' | Report | Hey (yellow card) 65'; K. Hansen (yellow card) 75'; Harder (yellow card) 90+5' | Stadium: Parken; Attendance: 30,365; Referee: Mads-Kristoffer Kristoffersen |

| 1 March 2024 20 | Midtjylland | 2–0 | Copenhagen | Herning |
| 19:00 CET | Bech 34' (Sørensen); Cho (penalty missed) 52'; Osorio 90+4' | Report | Falk (yellow card) 62' | Stadium: MCH Arena; Attendance: 11,836; Referee: Sandi Putros |

| 10 March 2024 21 | Copenhagen | 4–0 | Lyngby | Copenhagen |
| 16:00 CET | Winther 39' (o.g.); Falk 41'; Elyounoussi 45+1' (Mattsson); Bardghji (yellow card) 65'; Gonçalves 67' (Falk) | Report | Gregor (yellow card) 37' | Stadium: Parken; Attendance: 29,848; Referee: Jens Maae |

| 17 March 2024 22 | OB | 0–2 | Copenhagen | Odense |
| 17:00 CET | Köhler (yellow card) 90+2' | Report | Mattsson 23' (Elyounoussi); Cornelius 65' (Achouri) | Stadium: Nature Energy Park; Attendance: 14,644; Referee: Jakob Kehlet |

==== Championship Round ====
| 1 April 2024 23 | Copenhagen | 1–2 | Brøndby | Copenhagen |
| 14:00 CEST | Ankersen 42' (Lerager); Achouri (yellow card) 80' | Report | Omoijuanfo (yellow card) 51'; Kvistgaarden 69' (Suzuki); Klaiber 90+3' (Rasmussen) | Stadium: Parken; Attendance: 34,017; Referee: Sandi Putros |

| 7 April 2024 24 | Nordsjælland | 1–2 | Copenhagen | Farum |
| 16:00 CEST | Osman; Schjelderup (yellow card) 23'; Ingvartsen 29'; Nagalo (yellow card) 41' | Report | Bardghji (penalty missed) 45+3'; Óskarsson 47'; Sørensen (yellow card) 68' | Stadium: Right to Dream Park; Attendance: 8,461; Referee: Jakob Karlsen |

| 14 April 2024 25 | Midtjylland | 2–2 | Copenhagen | Herning |
| 17:00 CEST | Djú 20' (Osorio); Osorio 41'; Dalsgaard (yellow card) 85' | Report | Cornelius 11' (Achouri); Lerager (yellow card) 28'; Elyounoussi (yellow card) 36'; Diks 90+5' (pen.) | Stadium: MCH Arena; Attendance: 11,714; Referee: Morten Krogh |

| 21 April 2024 26 | Copenhagen | 2–0 | Silkeborg | Copenhagen |
| 16:00 CEST | Ankersen (yellow card) 9'; Vavro 45'; Clem (yellow card) 51'; Larsson 61' (Achouri) | Report | Mattsson (yellow card) 23' | Stadium: Parken; Attendance: 28,674; Referee: Jørgen Daugbjerg Burchardt |

| 28 April 2024 27 | Copenhagen | 3–2 | AGF | Copenhagen |
| 18:00 CEST | Claesson (yellow card) 43'; Óskarsson 57' (Claesson) 85' (Achouri) 90+3' (Elyounoussi); Falk (yellow card) 82' | Report | Knudsen (yellow card) 20'; Kahl 67'; Anker 90+4' (Mortensen) | Stadium: Parken; Attendance: 29,648; Referee: Sandi Putros |

| 5 May 2024 28 | Silkeborg | 0–3 | Copenhagen | Silkeborg |
| 16:00 CEST | | Report | Elyounoussi 3' (Achouri) 27'; Achouri (yellow card) 45+4'; Ankersen (yellow card) 78'; Gonçalves 87' (Claesson) | Stadium: JYSK Park; Attendance: 6,481; Referee: Jens Maae |

| 12 May 2024 29 | Brøndby | 1–3 | Copenhagen | Brøndbyvester |
| 16:00 CEST | Vallys 31'; Tshiembe (red card) 90+9' | Report | Diks 39' (Óskarsson) (yellow card) 83' (goal) 90+12' (pen.); Achouri (yellow card) 45+5'; Elyounoussi 54' (Mattsson); Jelert (yellow card) 76'; Larsson (yellow card) 72' | Stadium: Brøndby Stadium; Attendance: 26,267; Referee: Jakob Kehlet |

| 16 May 2024 30 | Copenhagen | 1–2 | Midtjylland | Copenhagen |
| 20:00 CEST | Mattsson (yellow card) 49'; Gonçalves 87' (pen.) | Report | Djú 23'; Emiliano Martínez (yellow card) 30'; Charles (yellow card) 33' (goal) 37' (Djú); Dalsgaard (yellow card) 41'; Osorio (yellow card) 42'; Brynhildsen (yellow card) 65'; Cho (yellow card) 90+3' | Stadium: Parken; Attendance: 34,917; Referee: Mads-Kristoffer Kristoffersen |

| 21 May 2024 31 | AGF | 3–2 | Copenhagen | Aarhus |
| 19:00 CEST | Madsen 15' (Anderson) 28' (Bech) 45+2'; Poulsen (yellow card) 59'; Andersen (yellow card) 88'; Beijmo (yellow card) 89' | Report | Óskarsson 13' (Achouri) 80' | Stadium: Ceres Park; Attendance: 13,176; Referee: Jorgen Daugberg Burchardt |

| 26 May 2024 32 | Copenhagen | 1–1 | Nordsjælland | Copenhagen |
| 17:00 CEST | Claesson 35' (Ankersen); Vavro (yellow card) 66' | Report | Ingvartsen (yellow card) 52'; Harder 87' (Hey) | Stadium: Parken; Attendance: 30,289; Referee: Mikkel Redder |

=== European play-offs ===
The 3rd-placed team of the championship round advances to a play-off match against the winning team of the qualification round (no. 7) in a single-leg tie, with the team from the championship round as hosts. The winner earns a place in the Conference League second qualifying round.

=== European play-off match ===
| 31 May 2024 Playoff | Copenhagen | 2–1 | Randers | Copenhagen |
| 19:00 CEST | Ankersen (yellow card) 11'; Óskarsson 13' (Elyounoussi); Diks (yellow card) 44'; Elyounoussi 56' (Ankersen); Vavro (yellow card) 69' | | Dammers 5' (Enggård); Coulibaly (yellow card) 44' | Stadium: Parken; Attendance: 24,866; Referee: Jakob Kehlet |

=== Danish Cup ===
==== Early Rounds ====
| 27 September 2023 Third Round | Lyseng | 0–9 | Copenhagen | Aarhus |
| 19:45 CEST | Faizi (yellow card) 43' | Report | Sahsah 3' (Vavro); Elyounoussi 12' (Ankersen); Óskarsson 14' (Ankersen) 20'; Bardghji 28' (Claesson); Lerager 79' (Falk) 84' (Ankersen); Froholdt 90' (O. Højlund); Vavro 90+5' | Stadium: Ceres Park; Attendance: 3,721; Referee: Aydin Uslu |

| 31 October 2023 Fourth Round | Copenhagen | 1–0 | FC Midtjylland | Copenhagen |
| 20:15 CEST | Vavro (yellow card) 71'; Bardghji 77' (Lerager) (yellow card) 90' | Report | Olsson (yellow card) 45+1'; Djú (yellow card) 82' | Stadium: Parken; Attendance: 17,895; Referee: Morten Krogh |

==== Quarter-finals ====
| 6 December 2023 Quarter-finals first leg | Copenhagen | 0–2 | Silkeborg | Copenhagen |
| 20:15 CET | Falk (yellow card) 58'; Bardghji (yellow card) 73' | Report | McCowatt 43' (Sonne) (yellow card) 45+1'; Klynge 64' (Þórðarson) | Stadium: Parken; Attendance: 14,290; Referee: Jens Maae |

| 9 December 2023 Quarter-finals second leg | Silkeborg | 1–2 (3–2 agg.) | Copenhagen | Silkeborg |
| 19:00 CET | Mattsson (yellow card) 13'; Klynge (yellow card) 86' | Report | Østrøm 36' (o.g.); Sørensen 45+2' (Falk); Diks (yellow card) 64'; Ankersen (yellow card) 82' | Stadium: JYSK Park; Attendance: 4,620; Referee: Jakob Kehlet |

=== UEFA Champions League ===
==== Second Qualifying round ====
| 25 July 2023 Second Qualifying | Breiðablik (Iceland) | 0–2 | Copenhagen | Kópavogur, Iceland |
| 21:00 CEST | Ingvarsson (yellow card) 90' | FCK Summary | Larsson 1'; Falk 32' (Larsson); Jóhannesson (yellow card) 90+2' | Stadium: Kópavogsvöllur; Attendance: 1,500; Referee: Gergo Bogár (Hungary) |

| 2 August 2023 Second Qualifying | Copenhagen | 6–3 (8–3 agg.) | (Iceland) Breiðablik | Copenhagen |
| 20:00 CEST | Lund (yellow card) 8'; Gonçalves 33'; Achouri 35' (Gonçalves); Larsson 37' (Óskarsson); Óskarsson 45+1' (Gonçalves) 47' (Gonçalves) 56' | FCK Summary | Svanþórsson 9' (Sigurjónsson); Margeirsson (yellow card) 32'; Steindórsson 51' (Yeoman); Gunnlaugsson 71' (yellow card) 82' | Stadium: Parken; Attendance: 20,886; Referee: Fabio Maresca (Italy) |

==== Third Qualifying round ====
| 8 August 2023 Third Qualifying | Copenhagen | 0–0 | Sparta Prague (Czech Republic) | Copenhagen |
| 20:00 CEST | Falk (yellow card) 28'; Vavro (yellow card) 87'; Lerager (yellow card) 89'; Jelert (yellow card) 90+5' | FCK Summary | Kuchta (yellow card) 38'; Zelený (yellow card) 78'; Krejčí (yellow card) 87' | Stadium: Parken; Attendance: 27,170; Referee: Benoît Bastien (France) |

| 15 August 2023 Third Qualifying | (Czech Republic) Sparta Prague | 3–3 (a.e.t.) (3–3 agg.) (2–4 p) | Copenhagen | Prague, Czech Republic |
| 19:00 CEST | Wiesner (yellow card) 48'; Birmančević (yellow card) 54' (goal) 80' (Zelený); Sørensen (yellow card) 68'; Laçi 105'; Olatunji 107' | FCK Summary | Larsson 1' (Achouri); Falk (yellow card) 36'; Elyounoussi (yellow card) 42'; Claesson 105+3' 112' (Sørensen); Achouri (yellow card) 114' | Stadium: Stadion Letná; Attendance: 18,109; Referee: Serdar Gözübüyük (Netherlands) |
| | Penalties |
| | Krejčí (penalty missed); Laçi (penalty scored); Kairinen (penalty scored); Sørensen (penalty missed) | | (penalty scored) Diks; (penalty scored) Claesson; (penalty scored) Boilesen; (penalty scored) Bardghji |

==== Play-off round ====
| 22 August 2023 Play-off | Raków Częstochowa (Poland) | 0–1 | Copenhagen | Środula, Sosnowiec, Poland |
| 21:00 CEST | | Report | Racovițan 9' (o.g.); Óskarsson (yellow card) 89'; Jelert (yellow card) 90+3' | Stadium: Zagłębiowski Park Sportowy; Attendance: 11,600; Referee: Irfan Peljto (Bosnia and Herzegovina) |

| 30 August 2023 Play-off | Copenhagen | 1–1 (2–1 agg.) | (Poland) Raków Częstochowa | Copenhagen |
| 21:00 CEST | Vavro 35'; Claesson (yellow card) 48'; Lerager (yellow card) 81'; Diks (yellow card) 84'; Falk (yellow card) 88' | Report | Arsenić (yellow card) 12'; Rundić (yellow card) 42'; Kocherhin (yellow card) 69'; Zwoliński 87' (Tudor) | Stadium: Parken; Attendance: 34,737; Referee: István Kovács (Romania) |

==== Group stage ====
| Pos | Team | Pld | W | D | L | GF | GA | GD | Pts | Qualification | BAY | CPH | GAL | MUN |
|---|---|---|---|---|---|---|---|---|---|---|---|---|---|---|
| 1 | (Germany) Bayern Munich | 6 | 5 | 1 | 0 | 12 | 6 | +6 | 16 | Advance to knockout phase | — | 0–0 | 2–1 | 4–3 |
| 2 | (Denmark) Copenhagen | 6 | 2 | 2 | 2 | 8 | 8 | 0 | 8 | Advance to knockout phase | 1–2 | — | 1–0 | 4–3 |
| 3 | (Turkey) Galatasaray | 6 | 1 | 2 | 3 | 10 | 13 | −3 | 5 | Transfer to Europa League | 1–3 | 2–2 | — | 3–3 |
| 4 | (England) Manchester United | 6 | 1 | 1 | 4 | 12 | 15 | −3 | 4 | | 0–1 | 1–0 | 2–3 | — |

Source: UEFA
Rules for classification: Group stage tiebreakers

| 20 September 2023 Matchday 1 | Galatasaray (Turkey) | 2–2 | Copenhagen | Istanbul, Turkey |
| 18:45 CEST | Ziyech (yellow card) 39'; Oliveira (yellow card) 77'; Boey 86'; Tetê 88' (Zaha) | Report | Lerager (yellow card) 11'; Elyounoussi 35' (Lerager); Jelert (yellow card) 52' (yellow-red card) 73'; Gonçalves 58' (Meling); Diks (yellow card) 73'; Meling (yellow card) 82' | Stadium: Ali Sami Yen Spor Kompleksi; Attendance: 46,911; Referee: Georgi Kabakov (Bulgaria) |

| 3 October 2023 Matchday 2 | Copenhagen | 1–2 | (Germany) Bayern Munich | Copenhagen |
| 21:00 CEST | Meling (yellow card) 54'; Lerager 55' (yellow card) 63'; Vavro (yellow card) 90' | Report | Musiala 67' (Mazraoui) (yellow card) 69'; Tel 83' (Müller) | Stadium: Parken; Attendance: 35,690; Referee: Orel Grinfeld (Israel) |

| 24 October 2023 Matchday 3 | Manchester United (England) | 1–0 | Copenhagen | Manchester, England |
| 21:00 CEST | Maguire 72'; Fernandes (yellow card) 80'; McTominay (yellow card) 90+5' | Report | | Stadium: Old Trafford; Attendance: 73,249; Referee: Marco Guida (Italy) |

| 8 November 2023 Matchday 4 | Copenhagen | 4–3 | (England) Manchester United | Copenhagen |
| 21:00 CEST | Elyounoussi 45' (Gonçalves); Gonçalves 45+9' (pen.); Vavro (yellow card) 45+11'; Lerager 83' (Falk); Bardghji 87' | Report | Rashford (red card) 42'; Maguire (yellow card) 90+3' | Stadium: Parken; Attendance: 36,099; Referee: Donatas Rumšas (Lithuania) |

| 29 November 2023 Matchday 5 | Bayern Munich (Germany) | 0–0 | Copenhagen | Munich, Germany |
| 21:00 CEST | Ulreich (yellow card) 73' | Report | Gonçalves (yellow card) 24'; Falk (yellow card) 55' | Stadium: Munich Football Arena; Attendance: 75,000; Referee: Stéphanie Frappart (France) |

| 12 December 2023 Matchday 6 | Copenhagen | 1–0 | (Turkey) Galatasaray | Copenhagen |
| 21:00 CEST | Jelert (yellow card) 37'; Lerager 58' (Achouri) (yellow card) 85' (yellow-red card) 90' | Report | Zaha (yellow card) 56' | Stadium: Parken; Attendance: 34,726; Referee: Daniele Orsato (Italy) |

==== Round of 16 ====
| 13 February 2024 Round of 16 | Copenhagen | 1–3 | (England) Manchester City | Copenhagen |
| 21:00 CET | Mattsson 34'; Falk (yellow card) 71'; Diks (yellow card) 74' | Report | De Bruyne 10' (Foden); Bernardo Silva 45' (De Bruyne); Foden 90+2' (De Bruyne) | Stadium: Parken; Attendance: 35,853; Referee: José María Sánchez Martínez (Spain) |

| 6 March 2024 Round of 16 | Manchester City (England) | 3–1 (6–2 agg.) | Copenhagen | Manchester, England |
| 20:00 GMT | Akanji 5' (Alvarez); Alvarez 9'; Haaland | Report | Elyounoussi 29' (Óskarsson); Cornelius (yellow card) 84'; Mattsson (yellow card) 90' | Stadium: City of Manchester Stadium; Attendance: 51,531; Referee: Espen Eskås (Norway) |

== Statistics ==
As of 31 May 2024

=== Appearances and goals ===
| No. | Pos | Nat | Player | Total | | Superliga | | Danish Cup | | Champions League | |
| No. | Pos | Nat | Player | Apps | Goals | Apps | Goals | Apps | Goals | Apps | Goals |
|---|---|---|---|---|---|---|---|---|---|---|---|
| 1 | GK | (Poland) POL | Kamil Grabara | 50 | 0 | 32 | 0 | 4 | 0 | 14 | 0 |
| 2 | DF | (Netherlands) NED | Kevin Diks | 49 | 4 | 31+1 | 4 | 3 | 0 | 14 | 0 |
| 3 | DF | (Slovakia) SVK | Denis Vavro | 46 | 4 | 25+3 | 2 | 3+1 | 1 | 14 | 1 |
| 5 | DF | (Georgia (country)) GEO | Davit Khocholava | 1 | 0 | 1 | 0 | 0 | 0 | 0 | 0 |
| 6 | DF | (Denmark) DEN | Christian Sørensen | 30 | 1 | 9+10 | 0 | 3 | 1 | 3+5 | 0 |
| 7 | MF | (Sweden) SWE | Viktor Claesson | 41 | 7 | 15+11 | 5 | 2+2 | 0 | 8+3 | 2 |
| 8 | MF | (Denmark) DEN | Magnus Mattsson | 15 | 3 | 12+1 | 2 | 0 | 0 | 1+1 | 1 |
| 9 | MF | (Portugal) POR | Diogo Gonçalves | 37 | 11 | 14+8 | 8 | 2 | 0 | 13 | 3 |
| 10 | MF | (Norway) NOR | Mohamed Elyounoussi | 54 | 14 | 34+5 | 10 | 2+1 | 1 | 12 | 3 |
| 11 | FW | (Sweden) SWE | Jordan Larsson | 37 | 6 | 8+15 | 3 | 2+1 | 0 | 8+3 | 3 |
| 12 | MF | (Denmark) DEN | Lukas Lerager | 41 | 7 | 13+13 | 2 | 2+1 | 2 | 11+1 | 3 |
| 14 | FW | (Denmark) DEN | Andreas Cornelius | 23 | 2 | 7+9 | 2 | 2+1 | 0 | 0+4 | 0 |
| 18 | FW | (Iceland) ISL | Orri Óskarsson | 42 | 15 | 19+9 | 10 | 2+1 | 2 | 3+8 | 3 |
| 19 | DF | (Denmark) DEN | Elias Jelert | 45 | 0 | 26+3 | 0 | 2+1 | 0 | 13 | 0 |
| 20 | DF | (Denmark) DEN | Nicolai Boilesen | 13 | 0 | 3+3 | 0 | 2 | 0 | 2+3 | 0 |
| 21 | GK | (Denmark) DEN | Theo Sander | 1 | 0 | 1 | 0 | 0 | 0 | 0 | 0 |
| 22 | DF | (Denmark) DEN | Peter Ankersen | 33 | 1 | 14+7 | 1 | 3+1 | 0 | 5+3 | 0 |
| 24 | DF | (Norway) NOR | Birger Meling | 24 | 0 | 12+7 | 0 | 0 | 0 | 4+1 | 0 |
| 26 | DF | (Scotland) SCO | Scott McKenna | 15 | 0 | 12+1 | 0 | 0 | 0 | 2 | 0 |
| 30 | MF | (Tunisia) TUN | Elias Achouri | 44 | 5 | 26+3 | 4 | 1+1 | 0 | 8+5 | 1 |
| 31 | GK | (Iceland) ISL | Rúnar Alex Rúnarsson | 0 | 0 | 0 | 0 | 0 | 0 | 0 | 0 |
| 33 | MF | (Denmark) DEN | Rasmus Falk | 47 | 4 | 22+8 | 3 | 2+2 | 0 | 13 | 1 |
| 36 | MF | (Denmark) DEN | William Clem | 26 | 0 | 14+8 | 0 | 0 | 0 | 3+1 | 0 |
| 39 | MF | (Denmark) DEN | Oscar Højlund | 23 | 0 | 5+6 | 0 | 3+1 | 0 | 0+8 | 0 |
| 40 | MF | (Sweden) SWE | Roony Bardghji | 36 | 10 | 17+6 | 7 | 1+3 | 2 | 4+5 | 1 |
| 44 | FW | (Denmark) DEN | Emil Højlund | 1 | 0 | 0+1 | 0 | 0 | 0 | 0 | 0 |
| 46 | MF | (Denmark) DEN | Noah Sahsah | 1 | 1 | 0 | 0 | 1 | 1 | 0 | 0 |
| 47 | MF | (Denmark) DEN | Victor Froholdt | 8 | 2 | 0+5 | 1 | 1+1 | 1 | 1 | 0 |
Players who are away on loan:
| 8 | MF | (Iceland) ISL | Ísak Bergmann Jóhannesson | 3 | 0 | 0+2 | 0 | 0 | 0 | 0+1 | 0 |
Players who left during the season:
| 8 | MF | (Argentina) ARG | Mateo Tanlongo | 2 | 0 | 0 | 0 | 0+1 | 0 | 0+1 | 0 |
| 27 | DF | (Denmark) DEN | Valdemar Lund | 10 | 1 | 3+2 | 1 | 1 | 0 | 2+2 | 0 |

=== Goal scorers ===
| Place | Position | Nation | Number | Name | Superliga | Pokalen | Champions League | Total |
|---|---|---|---|---|---|---|---|---|
| 1 | FW | (Iceland) | 18 | Orri Óskarsson | 10 | 2 | 3 | 15 |
| 2 | MF | (Norway) | 10 | Mohamed Elyounoussi | 10 | 1 | 3 | 14 |
| 3 | MF | (Portugal) | 9 | Diogo Gonçalves | 8 | 0 | 3 | 12 |
| 4 | MF | (Sweden) | 40 | Roony Bardghji | 7 | 2 | 1 | 10 |
| 5 | MF | (Denmark) | 12 | Lukas Lerager | 2 | 2 | 3 | 7 |
| 5 | MF | (Sweden) | 7 | Viktor Claesson | 5 | 0 | 2 | 7 |
| 7 | FW | (Sweden) | 11 | Jordan Larsson | 3 | 0 | 3 | 6 |
| 8 | MF | (Tunisia) | 30 | Elias Achouri | 4 | 0 | 1 | 5 |
| 9 | MF | (Denmark) | 33 | Rasmus Falk | 3 | 0 | 1 | 4 |
| 9 | DF | (Slovakia) | 3 | Denis Vavro | 2 | 1 | 1 | 4 |
| 9 | DF | (Netherlands) | 2 | Kevin Diks | 4 | 0 | 0 | 4 |
| 12 | MF | (Denmark) | 8 | Magnus Mattsson | 2 | 0 | 1 | 3 |
| 13 | MF | (Denmark) | 47 | Victor Froholdt | 1 | 1 | 0 | 2 |
| 13 | FW | (Denmark) | 14 | Andreas Cornelius | 2 | 0 | 0 | 2 |
| 15 | DF | (Denmark) | 27 | Valdemar Lund | 1 | 0 | 0 | 1 |
| 15 | MF | (Denmark) | 46 | Noah Sahsah | 0 | 1 | 0 | 1 |
| 15 | DF | (Denmark) | 6 | Christian Sørensen | 0 | 1 | 0 | 1 |
| 15 | DF | (Denmark) | 22 | Peter Ankersen | 1 | 0 | 0 | 1 |
| Opponent's own goal (s) | | | | | 1 | 1 | 1 | 3 |
| Total | | | | | 64 | 12 | 23 | 99 |

=== Assists ===
| Place | Position | Nation | Number | Name | Superliga | Pokalen | Champions League | Total |
|---|---|---|---|---|---|---|---|---|
| 1 | MF | (Tunisia) | 30 | Elias Achouri | 14 | 0 | 2 | 16 |
| 2 | MF | (Denmark) | 33 | Rasmus Falk | 4 | 2 | 1 | 7 |
| 3 | MF | (Portugal) | 9 | Diogo Gonçalves | 2 | 0 | 4 | 6 |
| 3 | DF | (Denmark) | 6 | Christian Sørensen | 5 | 0 | 1 | 6 |
| 3 | FW | (Iceland) | 18 | Orri Óskarsson | 4 | 0 | 2 | 6 |
| 6 | MF | (Norway) | 10 | Mohamed Elyounoussi | 5 | 0 | 0 | 5 |
| 6 | DF | (Denmark) | 22 | Peter Ankersen | 2 | 3 | 0 | 5 |
| 8 | MF | (Denmark) | 12 | Lukas Lerager | 2 | 1 | 1 | 4 |
| 9 | MF | (Sweden) | 7 | Viktor Claesson | 2 | 1 | 0 | 3 |
| 10 | MF | (Denmark) | 39 | Oscar Højlund | 1 | 1 | 0 | 2 |
| 10 | MF | (Denmark) | 8 | Magnus Mattsson | 2 | 0 | 0 | 2 |
| 12 | FW | (Sweden) | 11 | Jordan Larsson | 0 | 0 | 1 | 1 |
| 12 | DF | (Denmark) | 19 | Elias Jelert | 1 | 0 | 0 | 1 |
| 12 | DF | (Netherlands) | 2 | Kevin Diks | 1 | 0 | 0 | 1 |
| 12 | DF | (Norway) | 24 | Birger Meling | 0 | 0 | 1 | 1 |
| 12 | DF | (Slovakia) | 3 | Denis Vavro | 0 | 1 | 0 | 1 |
| 12 | FW | (Denmark) | 14 | Andreas Cornelius | 1 | 0 | 0 | 1 |
| 12 | MF | (Denmark) | 47 | Victor Froholdt | 1 | 0 | 0 | 1 |
| Total | | | | | 46 | 9 | 13 | 68 |

=== Clean Sheets ===
| Place | Position | Nation | Number | Name | Superliga | Pokalen | Champions League | Total |
|---|---|---|---|---|---|---|---|---|
| 1 | GK | (Poland) | 1 | Kamil Grabara | 10 | 2 | 5 | 17 |
| 2 | GK | (Denmark) | 21 | Theo Sander | 1 | 0 | 0 | 1 |
| Total | | | | | 11 | 2 | 5 | 18 |

=== Hat-tricks ===
| Player | Against | Result | Date | Competition | Ref |
|---|---|---|---|---|---|
| Orri Óskarsson | Breiðablik | 6–3 | 2 August 2023 | UEFA Champions League | |
| Orri Óskarsson | AGF | 3–2 | 28 April 2024 | Danish Superliga | |

=== Disciplinary record ===
| Number | Nation | Position | Name | Superliga | | | Pokalen | | | Champions League | | | Total | | |
| Number | Nation | Position | Name | Yellow card | (yellow card) (yellow-red card) | Red card | Yellow card | (yellow card) (yellow-red card) | Red card | Yellow card | (yellow card) (yellow-red card) | Red card | Yellow card | (yellow card) (yellow-red card) | Red card |
|---|---|---|---|---|---|---|---|---|---|---|---|---|---|---|---|
| 1 | (Poland) | GK | Kamil Grabara | 2 | 0 | 0 | 0 | 0 | 0 | 0 | 0 | 0 | 2 | 0 | 0 |
| 2 | (Netherlands) | DF | Kevin Diks | 4 | 1 | 0 | 1 | 0 | 0 | 3 | 0 | 0 | 8 | 1 | 0 |
| 3 | (Slovakia) | DF | Denis Vavro | 4 | 0 | 0 | 1 | 0 | 0 | 3 | 0 | 0 | 8 | 0 | 0 |
| 6 | (Denmark) | DF | Christian Sørensen | 3 | 0 | 0 | 0 | 0 | 0 | 0 | 0 | 0 | 3 | 0 | 0 |
| 7 | (Sweden) | MF | Viktor Claesson | 2 | 0 | 0 | 0 | 0 | 0 | 1 | 0 | 0 | 3 | 0 | 0 |
| 8 | (Denmark) | MF | Magnus Mattsson | 2 | 0 | 0 | 0 | 0 | 0 | 0 | 1 | 0 | 3 | 0 | 0 |
| 9 | (Portugal) | MF | Diogo Gonçalves | 4 | 0 | 0 | 0 | 0 | 0 | 2 | 0 | 0 | 6 | 0 | 0 |
| 10 | (Norway) | MF | Mohamed Elyounoussi | 2 | 0 | 0 | 0 | 0 | 0 | 1 | 0 | 0 | 3 | 0 | 0 |
| 11 | (Sweden) | FW | Jordan Larsson | 3 | 0 | 0 | 0 | 0 | 0 | 0 | 0 | 0 | 3 | 0 | 0 |
| 12 | (Denmark) | MF | Lukas Lerager | 2 | 0 | 0 | 0 | 0 | 0 | 5 | 1 | 0 | 7 | 1 | 0 |
| 14 | (Denmark) | FW | Andreas Cornelius | 0 | 0 | 0 | 0 | 0 | 0 | 1 | 0 | 0 | 1 | 0 | 0 |
| 18 | (Iceland) | FW | Orri Óskarsson | 0 | 0 | 0 | 0 | 0 | 0 | 1 | 0 | 0 | 1 | 0 | 0 |
| 19 | (Denmark) | DF | Elias Jelert | 5 | 0 | 0 | 0 | 0 | 0 | 4 | 1 | 0 | 9 | 1 | 0 |
| 20 | (Denmark) | DF | Nicolai Boilesen | 1 | 0 | 0 | 0 | 0 | 0 | 0 | 0 | 0 | 1 | 0 | 0 |
| 22 | (Denmark) | DF | Peter Ankersen | 4 | 0 | 0 | 1 | 0 | 0 | 0 | 0 | 0 | 5 | 0 | 0 |
| 24 | (Norway) | DF | Birger Meling | 1 | 0 | 0 | 0 | 0 | 0 | 2 | 0 | 0 | 3 | 0 | 0 |
| 27 | (Denmark) | DF | Valdemar Lund | 1 | 0 | 0 | 0 | 0 | 0 | 1 | 0 | 0 | 2 | 0 | 0 |
| 30 | (Tunisia) (France) | MF | Elias Achouri | 7 | 0 | 0 | 0 | 0 | 0 | 1 | 0 | 0 | 8 | 0 | 0 |
| 33 | (Denmark) | MF | Rasmus Falk | 4 | 0 | 0 | 1 | 0 | 0 | 6 | 0 | 0 | 11 | 0 | 0 |
| 36 | (Denmark) | MF | William Clem | 1 | 0 | 0 | 0 | 0 | 0 | 0 | 0 | 0 | 1 | 0 | 0 |
| 40 | (Sweden) | MF | Roony Bardghji | 2 | 0 | 0 | 2 | 0 | 0 | 0 | 0 | 0 | 4 | 0 | 0 |
Players who are away on loan:
| 8 | (Iceland) | MF | Ísak Bergmann Jóhannesson | 0 | 0 | 0 | 0 | 0 | 0 | 1 | 0 | 0 | 1 | 0 | 0 |
| Total | | | | 54 | 1 | 0 | 6 | 0 | 0 | 32 | 2 | 0 | 92 | 3 | 0 |

== Home attendance ==
As of match 31 May 2024

| Competition | Total | Games | Average |
|---|---|---|---|
| Superliga | 455,901 | 17 | 26,818 |
| Pokalen | 32,185 | 2 | 16,093 |
| Champions League | 225,161 | 7 | 32,166 |
| Total | 713,247 | 25 | 28,530 |
