= Oscar Højlund =

Danish footballer (born 2005)

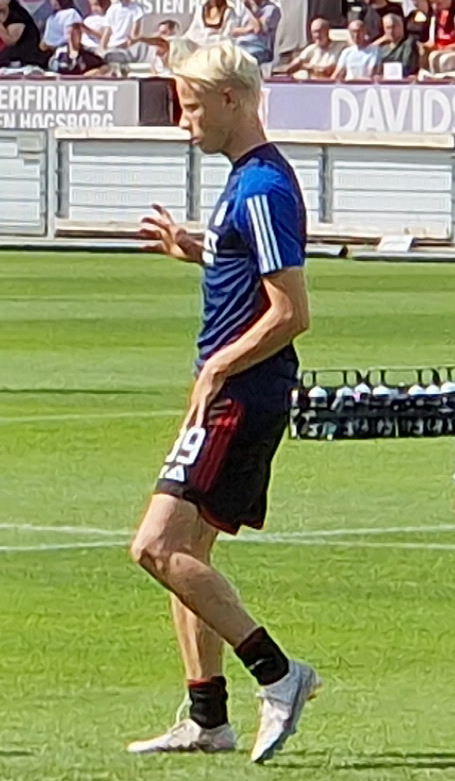
- Højlund with Copenhagen in 2023

Personal information
- Full name: Oscar Winther Højlund
- Date of birth: 4 January 2005 (age 21)
- Height: 1.84 m (6 ft 0 in)
- Position: Midfielder

Team information
- Current team: Eintracht Frankfurt
- Number: 6

Youth career
- Hørsholm-Usserød
- 2018–2023: Copenhagen

Senior career*
Years	Team	Apps	(Gls)
2023–2024	Copenhagen	11	(0)
2024–	Eintracht Frankfurt	46	(2)

International career^{‡}
2021–2022	Denmark U17	14	(1)
2022–2023	Denmark U18	10	(0)
2023–2024	Denmark U19	11	(1)
2025–	Denmark U21	6	(0)
- * Club domestic league appearances and goals as of 17:30, 19 September 2026 (UTC) ‡ National team caps and goals as of 01:52, 2 April 2026 (UTC)

Oscar Winther Højlund (born 4 January 2005) is a Danish professional footballer who plays as a midfielder for Bundesliga club Eintracht Frankfurt.

== Early life ==
Højlund was born to former Danish footballer Anders Højlund, who played in the Danish Superliga with B.93. He is the twin brother of Schalke 04 footballer Emil Højlund, and the younger brother of Danish international and Napoli footballer Rasmus Højlund.

== Club career ==
Højlund began his career with local side Hørsholm-Usserød, a club affiliated with Superliga side Copenhagen, whom he joined alongside his brother Emil at the age of thirteen. The pair extended their contracts with the club on 23 December 2021. His first taste of senior football came when he was named on the bench for a Superliga game against Viborg on 19 March 2023, though he did not feature. Two months later, following a number of injuries and suspensions to first team members, Højlund was again called up to the senior squad ahead of the Superliga fixture against AGF on 21 May, though he remained on the bench in this game.

Højlund made his unofficial debut for the club in a friendly match against Silkeborg in a 2–1 win on 5 July 2023. He made his Superliga debut on 22 July, coming on as a substitute alongside his brother Emil as Copenhagen beat Lyngby 2–1. The following month he made his European bow for Copenhagen, coming on as a second-half substitute for Elias Achouri in a 6–3 win against Icelandic opposition Breiðablik in qualification for the UEFA Champions League on 2 August.

=== Eintracht Frankfurt ===
On 10 July 2024, it was announced that Højlund had signed a five-year contract with German club Eintracht Frankfurt until June 2029.

== International career ==
Højlund has represented Denmark at under-17 and under-18 level.

== Style of play ==
Højlund has been described by Copenhagen's development director Sune Smith-Nielsen as an "energetic and dynamic central midfielder who can run from end to end", with good technique, vision and reading of the game.

== Career statistics ==
As of match played 19 September 2026

Appearances and goals by club, season and competition
Club	Season	League			National cup (Note: Includes Danish Cup, DFB-Pokal)		Europe		Total	
Club	Season	Division	Apps	Goals	Apps	Goals	Apps	Goals	Apps	Goals
Copenhagen	2023–24	Danish Superliga	11	0	4	0	8 (Note: Appearances in UEFA Champions League)	0	23	0
Eintracht Frankfurt	2024–25	Bundesliga	20	1	2	0	0	0	22	1
Eintracht Frankfurt	2025–26	Bundesliga	24	1	1	0	3	0	28	1
Eintracht Frankfurt	2026–27	Bundesliga	2	0	0	0	—		2	0
Eintracht Frankfurt	Total		46	2	3	0	3	0	52	2
Career total			55	2	7	0	11	0	72	2
