= Diogo Gonçalves =

Portuguese footballer (born 1997)

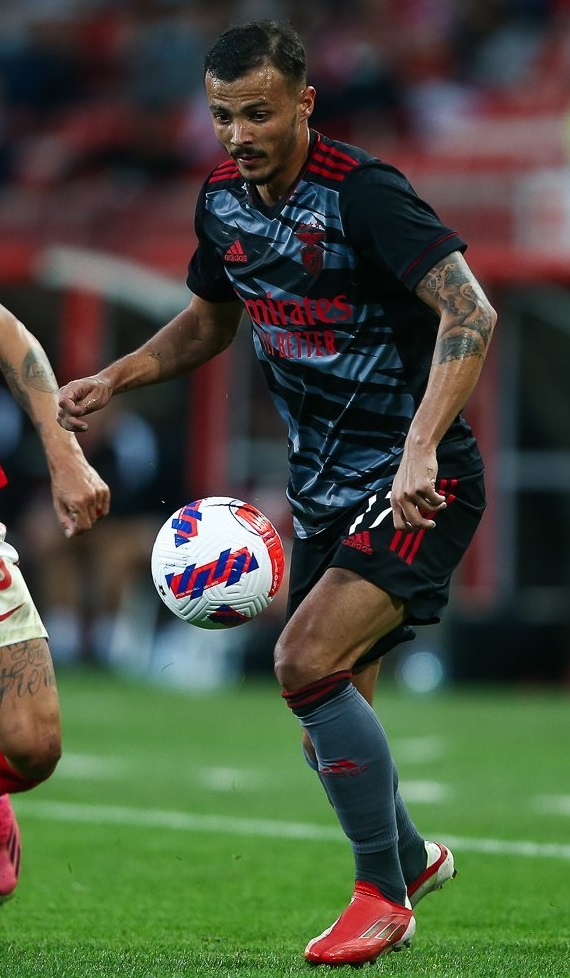
- Gonçalves playing for Benfica in 2021

Personal information
- Full name: Diogo António Cupido Gonçalves
- Date of birth: 6 February 1997 (age 29)
- Place of birth: Almodôvar, Portugal
- Height: 1.78 m (5 ft 10 in)
- Position: Winger

Team information
- Current team: Konyaspor
- Number: 17

Youth career
- 2005–2007: Almodôvar
- 2007–2008: Ferreiras
- 2008–2016: Benfica

Senior career*
| Years | Team | Apps | (Gls) |
| 2015–2018 | Benfica B | 86 | (15) |
| 2017–2023 | Benfica | 61 | (1) |
| 2018–2019 | → Nottingham Forest (loan) | 7 | (0) |
| 2019–2020 | → Famalicão (loan) | 27 | (5) |
| 2023–2024 | Copenhagen | 38 | (15) |
| 2024–2026 | Real Salt Lake | 38 | (6) |
| 2026– | Konyaspor | 7 | (2) |

International career
| 2012 | Portugal U15 | 2 | (0) |
| 2012–2013 | Portugal U16 | 9 | (2) |
| 2013–2014 | Portugal U17 | 17 | (3) |
| 2015 | Portugal U18 | 5 | (2) |
| 2015–2016 | Portugal U19 | 13 | (0) |
| 2016–2017 | Portugal U20 | 12 | (5) |
| 2017–2018 | Portugal U21 | 13 | (8) |
- * Club domestic league appearances and goals as of 10 June 2026

Diogo António Cupido Gonçalves (European Portuguese pronunciation: [diˈoɣu ɣõˈsalvɨʃ]; born 6 February 1997) is a Portuguese professional footballer who plays as a winger for Süper Lig club Konyaspor.

== Club career ==
=== Benfica ===
Born in Almodôvar, Gonçalves started his career at local club CD Almodôvar in 2005. Two years later, he joined Ferreiras, before moving to Benfica's youth system in 2008.

After being promoted from the youth team, Gonçalves debuted for the reserve team, Benfica B, as a substitute, playing 20 minutes in a Segunda Liga 4–1 home win over Oliveirense on 14 February 2015. On 24 May, he scored his first goal for Benfica B in a 2–1 home win over Vitória de Guimarães B. Five days later, he scored the only goal of a friendly held for the opening of FC United of Manchester's Broadhurst Park.

On 9 August 2017, Gonçalves debuted for Benfica's senior team in a 3–1 victory over Braga in the Primeira Liga. Later on, he made his UEFA Champions League debut in a 1–0 home loss to Manchester United on 18 October.

==== Nottingham Forest (loan) ====
On 14 June 2018, Gonçalves joined EFL Championship club Nottingham Forest on loan for the 2018–19 season with the option of making the transfer permanent at the end of the season. He made his only Championship start in the opening day 1–1 draw at Bristol City and was subsequently used sparingly by managers Aitor Karanka and Martin O'Neill, totalling ten games in all.

==== Famalicão (loan) ====
Gonçalves and Benfica teammate Guga both moved on 26 June 2019 to Famalicão, who were returning to the Primeira Liga after a quarter-century away; his deal was again a season-long loan. He scored his first goal on 19 December in a 3–0 home win over Mafra to reach the quarter-finals of the Taça de Portugal; there on 15 January 2020 he netted the only goal at Paços de Ferreira to put the team from Vila Nova de Famalicão into the last four for the first time since 1946.

==== Return to Benfica ====
In August 2020, Gonçalves renewed his contract with Benfica until 2025.

=== Copenhagen ===
On 5 January 2023, Gonçalves signed a four-year contract with Danish Superliga side F.C. Copenhagen. He made his debut for the club on 19 February 2023, starting in a 3–0 away win over Silkeborg. On 5 March 2023, Gonçalves scored his first goal for Copenhagen in the 7–0 thrashing of OB, opening the score from the penalty spot.

=== Real Salt Lake ===
On 9 August 2024, Gonçalves signed a two-year contract with Major League Soccer Side Real Salt Lake, making a move to the United States after his tenure in Europe. This marked his first experience in a non-European league.

== International career ==
Gonçalves has represented Portugal at various levels up to under-21 level.

== Career statistics ==
As of match played 31 October 2024

Appearances and goals by club, season and competition
| Club | Season | League | | | National cup (Note: Includes Taça de Portugal, Danish Cup) | | League cup (Note: Includes Taça da Liga, EFL Cup) | | Europe | | Other | | Total | |
| Club | Season | Division | Apps | Goals | Apps | Goals | Apps | Goals | Apps | Goals | Apps | Goals | Apps | Goals |
|---|---|---|---|---|---|---|---|---|---|---|---|---|---|---|
| Benfica B | 2014–15 | Segunda Liga | 10 | 1 | — | | — | | — | | — | | 10 | 1 |
| Benfica B | 2015–16 | LigaPro | 36 | 5 | — | | — | | — | | — | | 36 | 5 |
| Benfica B | 2016–17 | LigaPro | 35 | 8 | — | | — | | — | | — | | 35 | 8 |
| Benfica B | 2017–18 | LigaPro | 5 | 1 | — | | — | | — | | — | | 5 | 1 |
| Benfica B | Total | | 86 | 15 | — | | — | | — | | — | | 86 | 15 |
| Benfica | 2017–18 | Primeira Liga | 7 | 0 | 0 | 0 | 1 | 0 | 4 (Note: Appearances in UEFA Champions League) | 0 | 0 | 0 | 12 | 0 |
| Benfica | 2020–21 | Primeira Liga | 21 | 1 | 4 | 0 | 0 | 0 | 5 (Note: Appearances in UEFA Europa League) | 1 | 1 (Note: Appearance in Supertaça Cândido de Oliveira) | 0 | 31 | 2 |
| Benfica | 2021–22 | Primeira Liga | 23 | 0 | 0 | 0 | 3 | 0 | 8 | 0 | — | | 34 | 0 |
| Benfica | 2022–23 | Primeira Liga | 10 | 0 | 2 | 0 | 2 | 0 | 6 | 1 | — | | 20 | 1 |
| Benfica | Total | | 61 | 1 | 6 | 0 | 6 | 0 | 23 | 2 | 1 | 0 | 83 | 3 |
| Nottingham Forest (loan) | 2018–19 | EFL Championship | 7 | 0 | 0 | 0 | 3 | 0 | — | | 0 | 0 | 10 | 0 |
| Famalicão (loan) | 2019–20 | Primeira Liga | 27 | 5 | 5 | 2 | 1 | 0 | — | | — | | 33 | 7 |
| Copenhagen | 2022–23 | Danish Superliga | 14 | 6 | 4 | 3 | — | | — | | — | | 18 | 9 |
| Copenhagen | 2023–24 | Danish Superliga | 22 | 8 | 0 | 0 | — | | 13 | 3 | — | | 35 | 11 |
| Copenhagen | 2024–25 | Danish Superliga | 2 | 1 | 0 | 0 | — | | 0 | 0 | — | | 2 | 1 |
| Copenhagen | Total | | 38 | 15 | 4 | 3 | — | | 13 | 3 | — | | 55 | 21 |
| Real Salt Lake | 2024 | MLS | 9 | 2 | 0 | 0 | 0 | 0 | 0 | 0 | 2 | 0 | 11 | 2 |
| Career total | | | 228 | 38 | 15 | 5 | 10 | 0 | 36 | 5 | 3 | 0 | 293 | 48 |

== Honours ==
Benfica

- Primeira Liga: 2022–23
- Supertaça Cândido de Oliveira: 2017

Copenhagen

- Danish Superliga: 2022–23
- Danish Cup: 2022–23

Individual

- Danish Superliga Team of the Month: July 2023
