= Denis Vavro =

Slovak international footballer

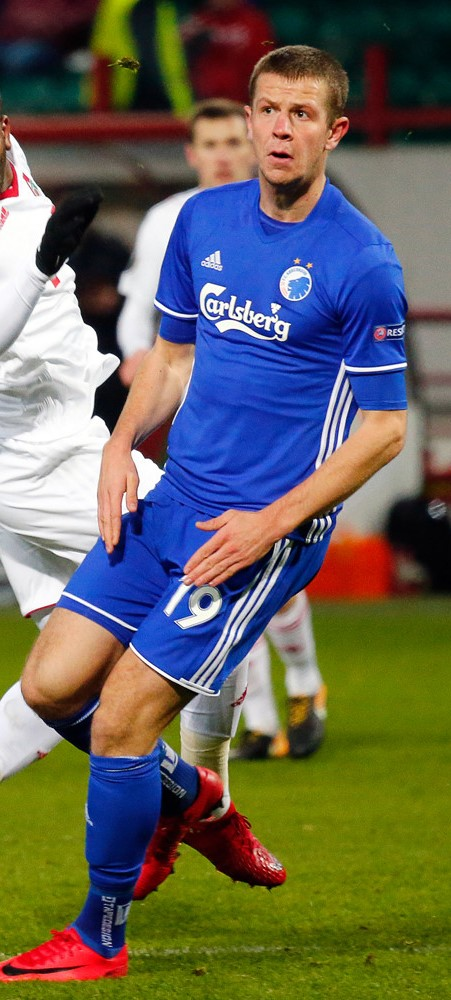
- Vavro with Copenhagen in 2017

Personal information
- Date of birth: 10 April 1996 (age 30)
- Place of birth: Partizánske, Slovakia
- Height: 1.90 m (6 ft 3 in)
- Position: Centre-back

Team information
- Current team: Viktoria Plzeň
- Number: 3

Youth career
- 2005–2011: Tempo Partizánske
- 2011–2015: Žilina

Senior career*
Years	Team	Apps	(Gls)
2012–2017	Žilina	74	(7)
2017–2019	Copenhagen	61	(1)
2019–2022	Lazio	13	(0)
2021	→ Huesca (loan)	11	(0)
2022	→ Copenhagen (loan)	14	(1)
2022–2025	Copenhagen	64	(3)
2024–2025	→ VfL Wolfsburg (loan)	29	(2)
2025–2026	VfL Wolfsburg	17	(1)
2026–	Viktoria Plzeň	0	(0)

International career^{‡}
2012–2014	Slovakia U17	5	(1)
2015–2018	Slovakia U21	12	(1)
2017–	Slovakia	35	(2)
- * Club domestic league appearances and goals as of 17:32, 16 May 2026 (UTC) ‡ National team caps and goals as of 11:42, 4 October 2026 (UTC)

Denis Vavro (born 10 April 1996) is a Slovak professional footballer who plays as a centre-back for Czech First League club Viktoria Plzeň and the Slovakia national team.

== Club career ==
=== Early club career ===
Vavro made his league debut for MŠK Žilina against AS Trenčín on 20 April 2013. On 26 August 2017, he signed a five-year contract with FC Copenhagen.

=== Lazio and loan to Huesca ===
On 4 July 2019, Vavro moved to Serie A team S.S. Lazio for a reported transfer fee of €10 million. On 1 February 2021, he moved to La Liga club Huesca on loan until the end of the season.

=== Return to Copenhagen ===
On 24 January 2022, Vavro returned to Copenhagen on loan with an option to buy. On 6 July 2022, it was announced that Copenhagen had triggered the option clause and he re-signed with the Danish team on a four-year contract. His spell at Lazio was described as unimpressive and Vavro appreciated the return to Denmark.

Days before Vavro confirmed his stay at Parken Stadium, a video surfaced on social media in which Vavro was asked if he hated Lazio, to which he quickly responded positively. Vavro soon apologised on social media, stating that the club was "big and historic" and even "too big for a player like him".

=== Wolfsburg ===
On 30 June 2024, Vavro was loaned to VfL Wolfsburg in Germany.

On 19 May 2025, VfL Wolfsburg exercised the option to buy and signed a two-year contract with Vavro.

=== Viktoria Plzeň ===
On 29 August 2026, Vavro signed a two-year contract with Czech First League club Viktoria Plzeň.

== International career ==
Vavro was called up for two unofficial friendly fixtures held in Abu Dhabi, United Arab Emirates, against Uganda and Sweden – debuting and scoring the team's only goal in a 3–1 loss against the former. He also played the full minutes in a 6–0 loss against the latter on 12 January.

Vavro returned to the Slovak senior team for the UEFA Euro 2020 qualifying campaign, playing six matches in Group E, as well as the play-off semi-final against the Republic of Ireland.

At the UEFA Euro 2020, Vavro was an unused substitute in the team's opening match against Poland, before testing positive for the COVID-19 pandemic on 17 June. This prevented him from playing in the remainder of the team's Group E matches as they failed to qualify for the knockout stage.

Vavro was included in Slovakia's squad for UEFA Euro 2024, starting in central defence in all of the team's matches as they reached the round of 16, losing 2–1 to England after extra time.

== Career statistics ==
=== Club ===
As of match played 25 May 2026

Appearances and goals by club, season and competition
Club	Season	League			National cup (Note: Includes Slovak Cup, Danish Cup, Coppa Italia, DFB-Pokal)		Europe		Other		Total	
Club	Season	Division	Apps	Goals	Apps	Goals	Apps	Goals	Apps	Goals	Apps	Goals
MŠK Žilina	2012–13	Slovak First League	4	0	0	0	0	0	—		4	0
MŠK Žilina	2013–14	Slovak First League	11	0	0	0	2 (Note: Appearances in UEFA Europa League)	0	—		13	0
MŠK Žilina	2014–15	Slovak First League	6	0	0	0	—		—		6	0
MŠK Žilina	2015–16	Slovak First League	23	1	5	1	8	1	—		36	3
MŠK Žilina	2016–17	Slovak First League	25	6	2	0	—		—		27	6
MŠK Žilina	2017–18	Slovak First League	5	1	0	0	2 (Note: Appearances in UEFA Champions League)	0	—		7	1
MŠK Žilina	Total		74	8	7	1	12	1	—		93	10
MŠK Žilina B	2014–15	Slovak 2. Liga	11	2	—		—		3 (Note: Appearances in Slovak 2. Liga promotion play-offs)	0	14	2
MŠK Žilina B	2015–16	Slovak 2. Liga	1	0	—		—		—		1	0
MŠK Žilina B	2016–17	Slovak 2. Liga	1	0	—		—		—		1	0
MŠK Žilina B	Total		13	2	—		—		3	0	16	2
Copenhagen	2017–18	Danish Superliga	26	1	1	0	8	0	—		35	1
Copenhagen	2018–19	Danish Superliga	35	0	1	0	14	2	—		50	2
Copenhagen	Total		61	1	2	0	22	2	—		85	3
Lazio	2019–20	Serie A	11	0	0	0	6	0	0	0	17	0
Lazio	2020–21	Serie A	1	0	1	0	0	0	—		2	0
Lazio	2021–22	Serie A	1	0	1	0	0	0	—		2	0
Lazio	Total		13	0	2	0	6	0	0	0	21	0
Huesca (loan)	2020–21	La Liga	11	0	0	0	—		—		11	0
Copenhagen (loan)	2021–22	Danish Superliga	14	1	0	0	2 (Note: Appearances in UEFA Europa Conference League)	0	—		16	1
Copenhagen	2022–23	Danish Superliga	29	1	1	0	6	0	—		36	1
Copenhagen	2023–24	Danish Superliga	29	2	4	1	13	0	—		46	3
Copenhagen	2024–25	Danish Superliga	5	0	0	0	6	0	—		11	0
Copenhagen	Total		63	3	5	1	25	0	—		93	4
VfL Wolfsburg (loan)	2024–25	Bundesliga	29	2	3	1	—		—		32	3
VfL Wolfsburg	2025–26	Bundesliga	17	1	1	0	—		2 (Note: Appearances in Bundesliga relegation play-offs)	0	20	1
Career total			295	18	20	3	67	3	5	0	387	24

=== International ===
As of match played 2 October 2026

Appearances and goals by national team and year
National team	Year	Apps	Goals
Slovakia	2017	2	1
Slovakia	2019	7	0
Slovakia	2020	2	0
Slovakia	2021	1	0
Slovakia	2023	7	1
Slovakia	2024	9	0
Slovakia	2025	2	0
Slovakia	2026	5	0
Total		35	2

As of 7 June 2025
Scores and results list Slovakia's goal tally first, score column indicates score after each Vavro goal.

List of international goals scored by Denis Vavro
No.	Date	Venue	Cap	Opponent	Score	Result	Competition
1	8 January 2017	Armed Forces Stadium, Abu Dhabi, United Arab Emirates	1	Uganda	1–2	1–3	Unofficial Friendly
2	20 June 2013	Rheinpark Stadion, Vaduz, Liechtenstein	15	Liechtenstein	0–1	0–1	UEFA Euro 2024 qualifying

== Honours ==
MŠK Žilina

- Fortuna Liga: 2016–17

Copenhagen

- Danish Superliga: 2018–19, 2022–23
- Danish Cup: 2022–23

Individual

- Peter Dubovský Award: 2017
