= Theo Sander =

Danish-French footballer (born 2005)

Personal information
- Full name: Theo Nicolini Sander
- Date of birth: 8 January 2005 (age 21)
- Place of birth: Skørping, Denmark
- Height: 1.92 m (6 ft 4 in)
- Position: Goalkeeper

Team information
- Current team: Elfsborg

Youth career
- IF Frem Skørping
- Støvring IF
- Gug Boldklub
- 2017–2023: AaB

Senior career*
Years	Team	Apps	(Gls)
2021–2023	AaB	14	(0)
2023–2026	Copenhagen	4	(0)
2025	→ Hvidovre (loan)	13	(0)
2025–2026	→ OB (loan)	7	(0)
2026–	Elfsborg	0	(0)

International career^{‡}
2020	Denmark U16	1	(0)
2021–2022	Denmark U17	11	(0)
2022	Denmark U18	3	(0)
2023	Denmark U19	7	(0)
2024	Denmark U20	1	(0)
2025–	Denmark U21	7	(0)
- * Club domestic league appearances and goals as of 8 July 2026 ‡ National team caps and goals as of 01:49, 2 April 2026 (UTC)

Theo Nicolini Sander (born 8 January 2005) is a Danish professional footballer who plays as a goalkeeper for Allsvenskan club Elfsborg.

== Career ==
=== AaB ===
As a youth player, Sander played for a local clubs, before joining AaB in 2017 at the age of 12. Possessing a physique suited for the goalkeeping position, Sander impressed in various youth teams and attracted interest from some of Europe's major clubs. In January 2021, AaB confirmed that Sander had been on a trial with Italian giants Juventus. AaB stated that they were "in dialogue with several clubs about Theo Sander". He would, however, end up staying at AaB. In April 2021, Sander was called up for his first professional game against Vejle Boldklub. However, he remained on the bench. In the 2021–22 season, Sander was on the bench for 14 Danish Superliga games.

In February 2022 AaB confirmed, that Sander had signed a new deal until June 2025. On 28 August 2022, 17-year old Sander made his official debut for AaB against Randers FC in the Superliga. AaB lost the match 1–0 after a bad pass from Sander was intercepted by Filip Bundgaard. With his debut, Sander became the youngest goalkeeper in the Danish Superliga history.

=== Copenhagen ===
On 20 July 2023, after AaB suffered relegation to the second division, Sander joined Copenhagen, on a deal until June 2028. He made his competitive debut for the club on 18 August, replacing an injured Kamil Grabara as starter in goal, keeping a clean sheet in a 2–0 victory against Hvidovre. In December 2023, Sander received surgery after suffering a knee injury, which kept him out for several months.

In search of more playing time, on February 3, 2025, on transfer deadline day, it was confirmed that Sander moved to Danish 1st Division club Hvidovre IF on a loan deal for the rest of the season. On 17 July 2025, Sander was once again loaned out, this time to Danish Superliga club OB until the end of the season, with a purchase option.

=== Elfsborg ===
In summer 2026, Sander signed a four-year contract with Swedish club IF Elfsborg.

== Personal life ==
Born in Denmark, Sander is of French and Danish descent.

== Career statistics ==
As of match played 1 June 2026

Appearances and goals by club, season and competition
Club	Season	League			Danish Cup		Europe		Other		Total	
Club	Season	Division	Apps	Goals	Apps	Goals	Apps	Goals	Apps	Goals	Apps	Goals
AaB	2022–23	Danish Superliga	14	0	1	0	—		—		15	0
Copenhagen	2023–24	Danish Superliga	1	0	0	0	0	0	—		1	0
Copenhagen	2024–25	Danish Superliga	3	0	1	0	1 (Note: Appearances in UEFA Conference League)	0	—		5	0
Copenhagen	Total		4	0	1	0	1	0	—		6	0
Hvidovre (loan)	2024–25	Danish 1st Division	13	0	0	0	—		—		13	0
Odense Boldklub (loan)	2025–26	Danish Superliga	7	0	4	0	—		—		11	0
Career total			38	0	6	0	1	0	0	0	45	0
