= Emil Højlund =

Danish footballer (born 2005)

Personal information
- Full name: Emil Winther Højlund
- Date of birth: 4 January 2005 (age 21)
- Place of birth: Hørsholm, Denmark
- Height: 1.91 m (6 ft 3 in)
- Position: Forward

Team information
- Current team: Schalke 04
- Number: 15

Youth career
- 2009–2018: Hørsholm-Usserød
- 2018–2024: Copenhagen

Senior career*
Years	Team	Apps	(Gls)
2022–2024	Copenhagen	1	(0)
2024–	Schalke 04	14	(0)
2024	Schalke 04 II	1	(0)

International career
2020–2021	Denmark U16	4	(0)
2021–2022	Denmark U17	11	(2)
2022	Denmark U18	2	(1)
2023–2024	Denmark U19	8	(2)
- * Club domestic league appearances and goals as of 3 October 2025

Emil Winther Højlund (born 4 January 2005) is a Danish professional footballer who plays as a forward for Bundesliga club Schalke 04.

== Early life ==
Højlund was born to former Danish footballer Anders Højlund, who played in the Danish Superliga with Boldklubben af 1893. He is the twin brother of Eintracht Frankfurt footballer Oscar Højlund, and the younger brother of Danish international and Napoli footballer Rasmus Højlund.

== Club career ==
Højlund began his career with local side Hørsholm-Usserød, a club affiliated with Danish Superliga side Copenhagen, whom he joined alongside his brother Oscar at the age of thirteen. His first taste of senior football came on 9 December 2021, when he was named on the bench for a UEFA Europa Conference League fixture against Slovan Bratislava, though he did not feature as a goal from his brother Rasmus helped Copenhagen to a 2–0 win. He extended his contract with the club on 23 December 2021, alongside his brother Oscar.

On 10 March 2022, Højlund made his professional debut for Copenhagen, coming on as a late substitute for Lukas Lerager in a 4–4 away draw to PSV Eindhoven in the UEFA Europa Conference League. Following the game, manager Jess Thorup said of both Højlund and fellow youth player Roony Bardghji, who had also featured in the game: "We are not afraid to use them, and they showed again that they are ready when it matters."

Højlund scored his first goal for the club in a friendly match against Silkeborg in a 2–1 win on 5 July 2023. He made his Superliga debut on 22 July, coming on as a substitute alongside his brother Oscar as Copenhagen beat Lyngby 2–1.

On 16 July 2024, German club Schalke 04 announced that they had signed Højlund until 30 June 2028.

== International career ==
Højlund has represented Denmark from under-16 to under-19 level.

== Style of play ==
Højlund has been described by Copenhagen's development director Sune Smith-Nielsen as a "complete striker who can play in the two front positions in the centre of the field", with good speed, technique, vision and finishing ability.

== Career statistics ==
As of match played 31 August 2025

Appearances and goals by club, season and competition
Club	Season	League			National cup (Note: Includes DFB-Pokal)		Europe		Total	
Club	Season	Division	Apps	Goals	Apps	Goals	Apps	Goals	Apps	Goals
Copenhagen	2021–22	Danish Superliga	0	0	0	0	2 (Note: Appearances in UEFA Conference League)	0	2	0
Copenhagen	2022–23	Danish Superliga	0	0	0	0	0	0	0	0
Copenhagen	2023–24	Danish Superliga	1	0	0	0	0	0	1	0
Copenhagen	Total		1	0	0	0	2	0	3	0
Schalke 04	2024–25	2. Bundesliga	10	0	0	0	—		10	0
Schalke 04	2025–26	2. Bundesliga	4	0	1	0	—		5	0
Schalke 04	Total		14	0	1	0	—		15	0
Schalke 04 II	2024–25	Regionalliga West	1	0	—		—		1	0
Career total			16	0	1	0	2	0	19	0
