= Luka Callø =

Danish footballer (born 2006)

Personal information
- Full name: Luka Callø Carstensen
- Date of birth: 10 June 2006 (age 20)
- Place of birth: Skødstrup, Denmark
- Height: 1.89 m (6 ft 2 in)
- Position: Centre-back

Team information
- Current team: AGF
- Number: 33

Youth career
- 2013–2017: Skødstrup SF
- 2017–2024: AGF

Senior career*
Years	Team	Apps	(Gls)
2024–	AGF	12	(0)
2025	→ Kolding (loan)	9	(0)
2025–2026	→ Aarhus Fremad (loan)	22	(1)

International career^{‡}
2024	Denmark U18	2	(0)
2024–2025	Denmark U19	12	(0)
- * Club domestic league appearances and goals as of 20:30, 26 August 2026 (UTC) ‡ National team caps and goals as of 18:57, 18 May 2025 (UTC)

Luka Callø Carstensen (born 10 June 2006) is a Danish professional footballer who plays as a centre-back for Danish Superliga club AGF.

== Career ==
=== AGF ===
Callø came to AGF from his childhood club, Skødstrup SF as a U11 player. Callø worked his way up through AGF's academy and in the winter of 2024, he got playing time in all six test matches for the club's Danish Superliga team.

On 14 April 2024, Callø made his official debut for AGF in a Danish Superliga match against Brøndby IF when he came on for the last 10 minutes of the match. In addition to his debut, he made two more appearances before the season ended.

In the summer of 2024, Callø signed a new contract until June 2028 and was permanently promoted to the first team.

On 3 February 2025, on transfer deadline day, it was confirmed that Callø joined Danish 1st Division club Kolding IF on a loan deal for the rest of 2025. He made 9 appearances for the club before AGF decided to recall him in early June 2025.

On transfer deadline day, 1 September 2025, Callø transferred to newly promoted Danish 1st Division club Aarhus Fremad on a loan deal until the end of the season.

== Personal life ==
Luka Callø's older brother, Gustav Callø, is also a football player.
