= Kamil Grabara =

Polish footballer (born 1999)

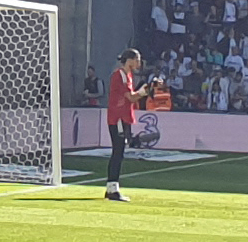
- Grabara during training with Copenhagen in 2022

Personal information
- Full name: Kamil Mieczysław Grabara
- Date of birth: 8 January 1999 (age 27)
- Place of birth: Ruda Śląska, Poland
- Height: 1.95 m (6 ft 5 in)
- Position: Goalkeeper

Team information
- Current team: Juventus (on loan from VfL Wolfsburg)
- Number: 1

Youth career
- 2006–2011: Wawel Wirek
- 2011–2012: Stadion Śląski Chorzów
- 2012–2015: Ruch Chorzów

Senior career*
Years	Team	Apps	(Gls)
2015–2016	Ruch Chorzów II	1	(0)
2016–2021	Liverpool	0	(0)
2019	→ AGF (loan)	16	(0)
2019–2020	→ Huddersfield Town (loan)	28	(0)
2020–2021	→ AGF (loan)	29	(0)
2021–2024	Copenhagen	87	(0)
2024–	VfL Wolfsburg	63	(0)
2026–	→ Juventus (loan)	0	(0)

International career^{‡}
2014–2015	Poland U16	5	(0)
2015–2016	Poland U17	9	(0)
2016	Poland U18	3	(0)
2017–2020	Poland U21	19	(0)
2022–	Poland	6	(0)
- * Club domestic league appearances and goals as of 26 August 2026 ‡ National team caps and goals as of 3 June 2026

Kamil Mieczysław Grabara (born 8 January 1999) is a Polish professional footballer who plays as a goalkeeper for Serie A club Juventus, on loan from 2. Bundesliga club VfL Wolfsburg, and the Poland national team.

== Club career ==
=== Early career ===
Grabara joined Liverpool ahead of the 2016–17 season from Ruch Chorzów for £250,000, and was promoted to the first-team squad for the 2018–19 season. He trained regularly with the first-team squad at Melwood and made his maiden senior outing in a pre-season friendly against Tranmere Rovers in July 2018. On 26 September 2018, Grabara was named on the substitutes' bench for the first time in Liverpool's 2–1 EFL Cup defeat to Chelsea at Anfield. On 6 January 2019, Grabara joined AGF on loan until the end of the season. On 15 July 2019, Grabara joined Championship side Huddersfield Town on a season-long loan deal.

At the end of September 2020, Grabara returned to Danish club AGF on loan for the 2020–21 season.

=== Copenhagen ===
On 3 July 2021, Grabara joined Copenhagen on a permanent basis, signing a five-year deal with the Danish side. Following his performances for the club both in the Danish Superliga and the UEFA Champions League, in December 2022 Grabara received the "Goalkeeper of the Year" award from the local sports magazine Tipsbladet.

In 2023 he caused controversy following a 2–2 draw with Galatasaray for posting derogatory comments on social media about the club. He called the club a "shithole" and in response he and his wife received over 300 death threats. The Turkish club responded by stating that they expected Grabara to be punished for breaking UEFA's fair play principles.

=== VfL Wolfsburg ===
On 6 September 2023, Bundesliga club VfL Wolfsburg announced the signing of Grabara on a long-term contract, starting from 1 July 2024, to replace the outgoing Koen Casteels. The fee was reported to be approximately €13.5 million, with Wolfsburg holding an option to have Grabara join them in January 2024, but they did not activate the option. In August 2024 Grabara in an interview with Kicker magazine admitted that his move to Wolfsburg was primarily motivated by financial gain.

At the end of the unsuccessful 2025–26 season for club, where they were relegated after losing the relegation play-off against Paderborn, Grabara's move to a stronger club became likely. The German tabloid Bild subsequently claimed that Grabara was an "arrogant loser" that fell out with his fellow Wolfsburg teammates.

==== Loan to Juventus ====
On 25 August 2026, Grabara joined Serie A club Juventus on loan until 30 June 2027 as reinforcement alongside Guglielmo Vicario, who had joined a week earlier. The two were signed following the departure of goalkeepers Michele Di Gregorio on loan to Bournemouth and Mattia Perin to Palermo. The loan cost the club €500,000, subject to various performance targets, with a buy-out clause of €11.5m should the move be made permanent. Grabara thus became the fourth Pole to play for Juventus.

On 17 September 2026, Grabara made his debut and first start for Juventus in an UEFA Europa League league phase match against Eredivisie side NEC Nijmegen. He provided an assist to Nico González's opening goal of a 5–0 win, making him the first-ever Juventus goalkeeper to assist on his debut. Two days later, Juventus announced that Grabara had ruptured his anterior cruciate ligament.

== International career ==
Grabara was a first choice goalkeeper for Poland U21 throughout most of his tenure with the squad, having made his debut against Denmark on 14 November 2017.

=== Senior ===
Grabara received his first call-up in the senior Polish national team for a friendly match against Scotland and the 2022 FIFA World Cup qualification playoff against Sweden on 24 and 29 March 2022, respectively. On 1 June 2022, he debuted as a starter in a 2–1 home 2022–23 UEFA Nations League victory against Wales.

On 20 October 2022, Grabara was selected by manager Czesław Michniewicz as part of the final squad for the 2022 FIFA World Cup, replacing Bartłomiej Drągowski who got injured just before the tournament. Grabara did not make a single appearance during the tournament as Poland were eliminated in the round of 16 by France.

== Style of play ==
Grabara is described as an allround goalkeeper, able to dominate the penalty area, pull off reflex saves, play out from the back and, as he develops, operate as a sweeper.

== Personal life ==
Grabara is from Ruda Śląska, in Southern Poland. He was the second Polish goalkeeper for Liverpool, after the 2005 UEFA Champions League Final hero Jerzy Dudek.

== Career statistics ==
=== Club ===
As of match played 17 September 2026

Appearances and goals by club, season and competition
Club	Season	League			National cup (Note: Includes FA Cup, Danish Cup, DFB-Pokal)		Europe		Other		Total	
Club	Season	Division	Apps	Goals	Apps	Goals	Apps	Goals	Apps	Goals	Apps	Goals
Ruch Chorzów II	2015–16	III liga, gr. F	1	0	—		—		—		1	0
Liverpool	2018–19	Premier League	0	0	0	0	0	0	—		0	0
AGF (loan)	2018–19	Danish Superliga	16	0	0	0	—		—		16	0
Huddersfield Town (loan)	2019–20	Championship	28	0	0	0	—		—		28	0
AGF (loan)	2020–21	Danish Superliga	29	0	5	0	—		—		35	0
Copenhagen	2021–22	Danish Superliga	32	0	0	0	12 (Note: Appearances in UEFA Europa Conference League)	0	—		44	0
Copenhagen	2022–23	Danish Superliga	23	0	5	0	4 (Note: Appearances in UEFA Champions League)	0	—		32	0
Copenhagen	2023–24	Danish Superliga	32	0	4	0	14	0	—		50	0
Copenhagen	Total		87	0	14	0	30	0	—		126	0
VfL Wolfsburg	2024–25	Bundesliga	29	0	3	0	—		—		32	0
VfL Wolfsburg	2025–26	Bundesliga	34	0	1	0	—		2 (Note: Appearances in Bundesliga relegation play-offs)	0	37	0
VfL Wolfsburg	Total		63	0	4	0	—		2	0	69	0
Juventus (loan)	2026–27	Serie A	0	0	0	0	1 (Note: Appearance in UEFA Europa League)	0	0	0	0	0
Career total			224	0	18	0	30	0	2	0	274	0

=== International ===
As of match played 3 June 2026

Appearances and goals by national team and year
National team	Year	Apps	Goals
Poland
Poland	2022	1	0
Poland	2023	0	0
Poland	2024	0	0
Poland	2025	2	0
Poland	2026	3	0
Total		6	0

== Honours ==
Copenhagen

- Danish Superliga: 2021–22, 2022–23
- Danish Cup: 2022–23

Individual

- Danish Goalkeeper of the Year: 2022, 2023
- FC Copenhagen Player of the Year: 2023
