= Matti Olsen =

Danish footballer (born 1995)

Personal information
- Full name: Matti Bøge Olsen
- Date of birth: 7 June 1995 (age 31)
- Place of birth: Copenhagen, Denmark
- Position: Centre-back

Team information
- Current team: Fremad Amager
- Number: 5

Youth career
- Copenhagen
- –2011: Nordsjælland
- 2011–2014: AB

Senior career*
Years	Team	Apps	(Gls)
2014–2019	AB	132	(5)
2019–2025	Hvidovre	169	(6)
2025	Sønderjyske	8	(0)
2025–	Fremad Amager	33	(0)
- * Club domestic league appearances and goals as of 3 October 2026

Matti Bøge Olsen (born 7 June 1995) is a Danish professional footballer who currently plays as a centre-back for Danish 2nd Division club Fremad Amager.

== Career ==
=== AB ===
Olsen progressed through the youth academies of Copenhagen and Nordsjælland, before joining AB's under-17 team in 2011, coached at the time by Thomas Nørgaard.

In July 2014, he was promoted to the first team, who were competing in the second-tier Danish 1st Division. He made his league debut on 17 August 2014, starting in a 1–0 away loss to Horsens. On 10 June 2015, Olsen signed a contract extension with AB, keeping him at the club until 2017. In his first season as part of the first team, he had made 18 appearances of which 14 were as a starter, as the club had suffered relegation to the third-tier Danish 2nd Division.

AB returned to the 1st Division after one season down, but the 2016–17 saw them relegate to the third tier again. On 9 June 2017, Olsen extended his contract by another year, following the club down a division. This time, AB would stay down, with Olsen being a regular starter for the club through the following two seasons. On 23 June 2018, he signed another one-year contract extension with the club.

=== Hvidovre ===
On 20 June 2019, Olsen signed a one-year contract with 1st Division club Hvidovre, where he was set to replace Malte Kiilerich who had moved to Horsens. He immediately became a starter for the club, debuting in central defense on the first matchday of the season, in a 2–1 away loss against Kolding. On 11 August, he scored his first goal for the club to save a point late in a 2–2 draw against Nykøbing.

Olsen reached promotion to the Danish Superliga with Hvidovre in the 2022–23 season, and extended his contract with the club shortly after. The previous seasons he had formed a defensive core alongside fellow centre-back Daniel Stenderup and goalkeeper Filip Đukić. On 21 July 2023, he made his Superliga debut in a 1–0 loss to Midtjylland, where he played 90 minutes.

=== Sønderjyske ===
On January 29, 2025, it was confirmed that Olsen had joined Danish Superliga side Sønderjyske on a deal until June 2026.

On 1 September 2025, Olsen's contract with the club was terminated by mutual agreement.

=== Fremad Amager ===
On 18 September 2025, Olsen joined Danish 2nd Division club Fremad Amager.
