= Elias Achouri =

Footballer (born 1999)

- Achouri with San Diego FC in 2026

Personal information
- Full name: Mohamed Elias Achouri
- Date of birth: 10 February 1999 (age 27)
- Place of birth: Saint-Denis, Réunion, France
- Height: 1.77 m (5 ft 10 in)
- Position: Winger

Team information
- Current team: San Diego FC
- Number: 99

Youth career
- –2016: Saint-Étienne
- 2016–2018: Vitória Guimarães

Senior career*
Years	Team	Apps	(Gls)
2019–2020	Vitória Guimarães B	17	(2)
2020–2022	Estoril	2	(0)
2021–2022	→ Trofense (loan)	27	(9)
2022–2023	Viborg	28	(6)
2023–2026	Copenhagen	72	(9)
2026–	San Diego FC	7	(2)

International career^{‡}
2022–	Tunisia	33	(5)
- * Club domestic league appearances and goals as of 10:52, 18 September 2026 (UTC) ‡ National team caps and goals as of 26 June 2026

Mohamed Elias Achouri (Arabic: مُحَمَّد إِلْيَاس عَاشُورِيّ; born 10 February 1999) is a professional footballer who plays as a winger for Major League Soccer club San Diego FC. Born in Réunion, an overseas department of France, he plays for the Tunisia national team.

== Club career ==
On 26 August 2021, Achouri joined Liga Portugal 2 club Trofense on loan from Estoril. On 31 August 2022, Achouri joined Danish Superliga side Viborg on a deal until June 2025.

Achouri made the move to 15-time Danish Superliga champions Copenhagen on 24 July 2023, signing a four-year deal with the Lions. This was at the time the biggest sale of a Viborg player ever.

On 24 July 2026, Achouri signed with Major League Soccer side San Diego FC on a three-year deal for an undisclosed fee.

== International career ==
Achouri was born in Saint-Denis, Réunion to a Tunisian father and an Algerian mother. He debuted for the Tunisia national team in a 4–0 win over Equatorial Guinea on 2 June 2022.

On 15 May 2026, Achouri was named in the Tunisia squad for the 2026 FIFA World Cup.

== Career statistics ==
=== Club ===
As of match played 14 September 2026

Appearances and goals by club, season and competition
Club	Season	League			National cup (Note: Includes Taça de Portugal, Danish Cup)		League cup (Note: Includes Taça da Liga)		Europe		Other		Total	
Club	Season	Division	Apps	Goals	Apps	Goals	Apps	Goals	Apps	Goals	Apps	Goals	Apps	Goals
Vitória Guimarães B	2018–19	LigaPro	8	0	—		—		—		—		8	0
Vitória Guimarães B	2019–20	LigaPro	9	2	—		—		—		—		9	2
Vitória Guimarães B	Total		17	2	—		—		—		—		17	2
Estoril	2020–21	Liga Portugal 2	0	0	0	0	0	0	—		—		0	0
Estoril	2021–22	Primeira Liga	0	0	0	0	1	0	—		—		1	0
Estoril	2022–23	Primeira Liga	2	0	0	0	0	0	—		—		2	0
Estoril	Total		2	0	0	0	1	0	—		—		3	0
Trofense (loan)	2021–22	Liga Portugal 2	27	9	1	0	0	0	—		—		28	9
Viborg	2022–23	Danish Superliga	24	6	3	0	—		0	0	1 (Note: Appearance in Danish Superliga European play-off)	0	12	0
Copenhagen	2023–24	Danish Superliga	28	4	2	0	—		13 (Note: Appearances in UEFA Champions League)	1	—		43	5
Copenhagen	2024–25	Danish Superliga	23	2	4	0	—		10 (Note: Appearances in UEFA Conference League)	0	—		37	2
Copenhagen	2025–26	Danish Superliga	21	3	5	1	—		11	1	—		37	5
Copenhagen	Total		72	9	11	1	—		34	1	—		117	11
San Diego FC	2026	Major League Soccer	7	2	0	0	—		—		—		7	2
Career total			149	28	15	1	1	0	34	2	1	0	200	31

=== International ===
As of match played 25 June 2026

Appearances and goals by national team and year
National team	Year	Apps	Goals
Tunisia	2022	2	0
Tunisia	2023	6	0
Tunisia	2024	9	1
Tunisia	2025	11	4
Tunisia	2026	5	0
Total		33	5

List of international goals scored by Elias Achouri
No.	Date	Venue	Opponent	Score	Result	Competition
1	10 January 2024	Hammadi Agrebi Stadium, Tunis, Tunisia	Cape Verde	1–0	2–0	Friendly
2	24 March 2025	Hammadi Agrebi Stadium, Tunis, Tunisia	Malawi	2–0	2–0	2026 FIFA World Cup qualification
3	14 November 2025	Hammadi Agrebi Stadium, Tunis, Tunisia	Jordan	3–2	3–2	Friendly
4	23 December 2025	Rabat Olympic Stadium, Rabat, Morocco	Uganda	2–0	3–1	2025 Africa Cup of Nations
5	23 December 2025	Rabat Olympic Stadium, Rabat, Morocco	Uganda	3–0	3–1	2025 Africa Cup of Nations

== Honours ==
Copenhagen

- Danish Superliga: 2024–25
- Danish Cup: 2024–25

Individual

- Superliga Team of the Month: September 2023
