= Lucas Hey =

Danish footballer (born 2003)

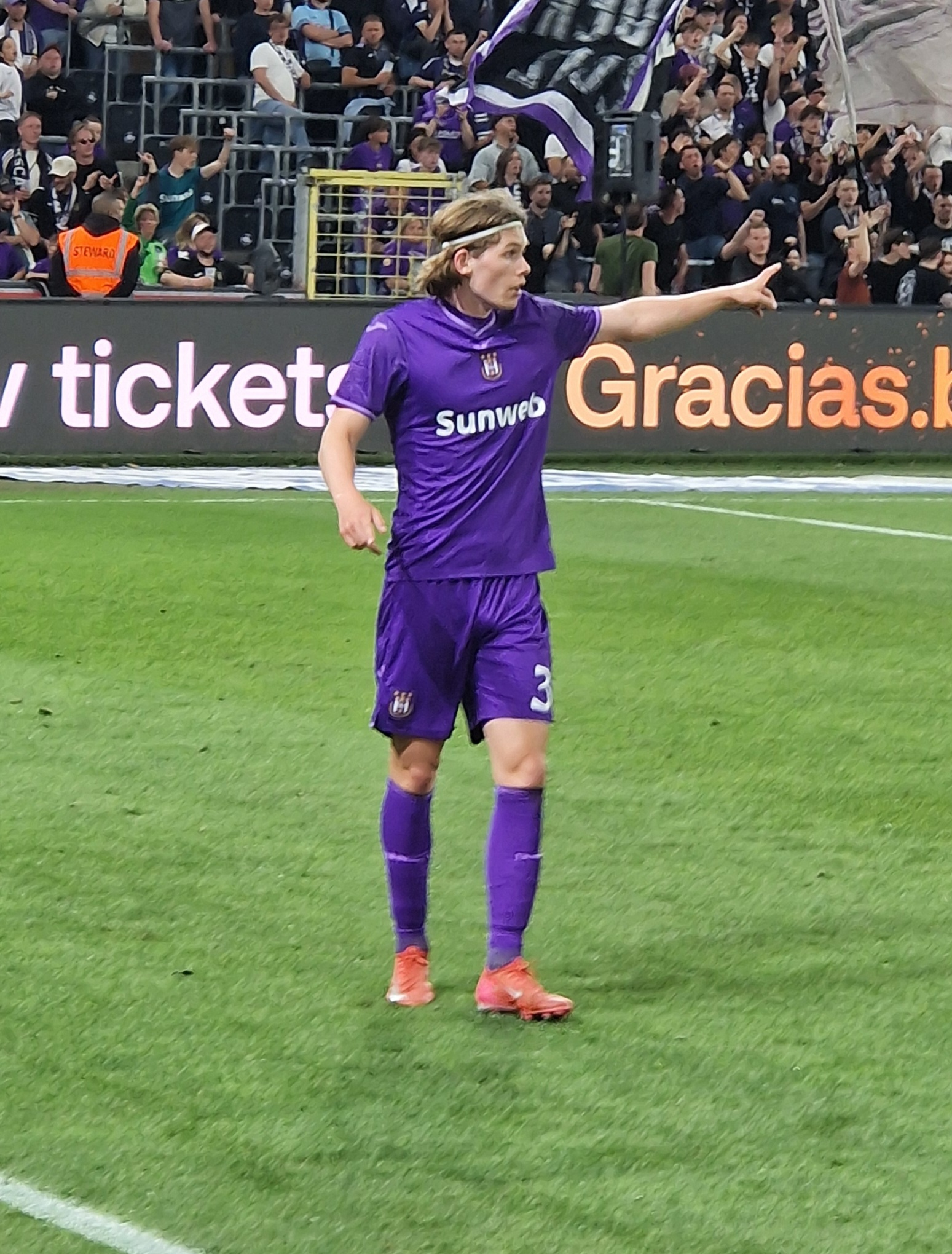
- Hey with Anderlecht in 2025

Personal information
- Full name: Lucas Boel Hey
- Date of birth: 13 April 2003 (age 23)
- Place of birth: Dragør, Denmark
- Height: 1.89 m (6 ft 2 in)
- Position: Centre-back

Team information
- Current team: Anderlecht
- Number: 3

Youth career
- Dragør
- AB Tårnby
- A27
- 2019–2022: Lyngby

Senior career*
| Years | Team | Apps | (Gls) |
| 2021–2023 | Lyngby | 30 | (0) |
| 2023–2025 | Nordsjælland | 37 | (1) |
| 2025– | Anderlecht | 47 | (0) |

International career
| 2021–2022 | Denmark U19 | 9 | (0) |
| 2022 | Denmark U20 | 1 | (0) |
| 2023–2025 | Denmark U21 | 16 | (0) |
- * Club domestic league appearances and goals as of 24 May 2026

Lucas Boel Hey (born 13 April 2003) is a Danish professional footballer who plays as a centre-back for Belgian Pro League club Anderlecht.

== Club career ==
=== Lyngby ===
Born in Dragør, Hey moved to Lyngby Boldklub in the summer of 2019, after playing for Dragør Boldklub, AB Tårnby and the newly established club A27. After a year and a half in the youth ranks with strong performances, Hey made his professional debut for Lyngby on 24 May 2021 against Vejle Boldklub in the Danish Superliga. Hey continued his success in the youth teams and was rewarded in January 2022 with a permanent promotion to the first team squad and a contract extension until June 2024.

Lyngby was promoted back to the Danish Superliga for the 2022–23 season and it was in this season that Hey would get his big breakthrough, where he became a regular in the Lyngby team.

=== Nordsjælland ===
On 6 August 2023, it was confirmed that Hey had joined fellow league club FC Nordsjælland, signing a deal until the end of 2027.

=== Anderlecht ===
On 21 January 2025 it was confirmed that Hey joined Belgian Pro League club Anderlecht on a deal until June 2029.

On 26 January 2025, Hey made his debut for Anderlecht in a 4–1 victory over KV Mechelen in the Jupiler Pro League, coming on as a 72nd-minute substitute. The following league game on 2 February, he earned his first start for Anderlecht, in a 1–0 loss to KAA Gent.

== Career statistics ==
As of match played 24 May 2026

Appearances and goals by club, season and competition
| Club | Season | League | | | National cup (Note: Includes Danish Cup, Belgian Cup) | | Europe | | Total | |
| Club | Season | Division | Apps | Goals | Apps | Goals | Apps | Goals | Apps | Goals |
|---|---|---|---|---|---|---|---|---|---|---|
| Lyngby | 2020–21 | Danish Superliga | 1 | 0 | 0 | 0 | — | | 1 | 0 |
| Lyngby | 2021–22 | Danish 1st Division | 2 | 0 | 1 | 0 | — | | 3 | 0 |
| Lyngby | 2022–23 | Danish Superliga | 24 | 0 | 1 | 0 | — | | 25 | 0 |
| Lyngby | 2023–24 | Danish Superliga | 3 | 0 | 0 | 0 | — | | 3 | 0 |
| Lyngby | Total | | 30 | 0 | 2 | 0 | 0 | 0 | 32 | 0 |
| Nordsjælland | 2023–24 | Danish Superliga | 20 | 0 | 4 | 0 | 8 (Note: Appearance(s) in UEFA Europa Conference League) | 1 | 32 | 1 |
| Nordsjælland | 2024–25 | Danish Superliga | 17 | 1 | 2 | 0 | — | | 19 | 1 |
| Nordsjælland | Total | | 37 | 1 | 6 | 0 | 8 | 1 | 51 | 2 |
| Anderlecht | 2024–25 | Belgian Pro League | 15 | 0 | 2 | 0 | 2 (Note: Appearance(s) in UEFA Europa League) | 0 | 19 | 0 |
| Anderlecht | 2025–26 | Belgian Pro League | 32 | 0 | 6 | 0 | 6 (Note: Two appearances in UEFA Europa League, four appearance in UEFA Conference League) | 0 | 44 | 0 |
| Anderlecht | Total | | 47 | 0 | 8 | 0 | 8 | 0 | 63 | 0 |
| Career total | | | 114 | 1 | 16 | 0 | 16 | 1 | 146 | 2 |

== Honours ==
Individual

- Superliga Team of the Month: July 2023
