= William Kaastrup =

Danish footballer (born 2004)

Personal information
- Full name: William Elgaard Kaastrup
- Date of birth: 21 March 2004 (age 22)
- Place of birth: Vedbæk, Denmark
- Height: 1.76 m (5 ft 9 in)
- Position: Left-back

Youth career
- Søllerød-Vedbæk
- Copenhagen
- 2023: Randers

Senior career*
| Years | Team | Apps | (Gls) |
| 2023–2024 | Randers | 9 | (0) |
| 2024 | → Västerås (loan) | 0 | (0) |
| 2024–2025 | FC Roskilde | 0 | (0) |

International career
| 2021 | Denmark U18 | 4 | (0) |
| 2022–2023 | Denmark U19 | 3 | (0) |
| 2023 | Denmark U20 | 1 | (0) |
- * Club domestic league appearances and goals as of 14 December 2023

William Elgaard Kaastrup (born 21 March 2004) is a Danish footballer who plays as a left-back.

== Club career ==
On 21 January 2023, Randers FC confirmed that the club had signed 18-year old Kaastrup from F.C. Copenhagen, effective from the summer of 2023. Five days later, however, Randers confirmed that the clubs had agreed on a deal that sent Kaastrup to Randers with immediate effect instead. Kaastrup signed a deal until June 2026.

After a few appearances for Randers' U19 team, Kaastrup made his official debut for his new club on 23 April 2023 against Brøndby IF, replacing Adam Andersson for the last few minutes. In pursuit of more playing time, on 31 January 2024, Kaastrup was loaned to Swedish Allsvenskan club Västerås until the end of the year.

However, Kaastrup did not play any official matches in Västerås before returning to Denmark in the summer of 2024, and on 2 September 2024 his contract with Randers was also terminated.

On September 12, 2024 Kaastrup moved to Danish 1st Division club FC Roskilde on a deal until June 2025. According to a media outlet, although it was never officially confirmed, Kaastrup's contract was terminated in January 2025. This was later supported by the fact that Kaastrup was no longer on the squad list on the club's website.
