= 2020–21 Aarhus Gymnastikforening season =

AGF
2020–21 season
- Chairman: Jacob Nielsen
- Manager: David Nielsen
- Stadium: Ceres Park
- Danish Superliga: 4th
- Danish Cup: Semi-finals
- UEFA Europa League: Second qualifying round
- Top goalscorer: League: Patrick Mortensen (15); All: Patrick Mortensen (18)
Home colours	Away colours

During the 2020–21 season, AGF competed in the Superliga, the top-flight of Danish football, and in this season's editions of the Danish Cup and UEFA Europa League. The season covers the period from July 2020 to 30 June 2021.

== Players ==
As of 1 February 2021

Note: Flags indicate national team as defined under FIFA eligibility rules; some limited exceptions apply. Players may hold more than one non-FIFA nationality.

No.	Pos.	Nation	Player
1	GK	SWE	William Eskelinen
2	DF	AUS	Alex Gersbach
3	DF	SWE	Niklas Backman (captain)
5	DF	DEN	Frederik Tingager
6	MF	DEN	Nicolai Poulsen
7	MF	SRB	Milan Jevtović
9	FW	DEN	Patrick Mortensen (vice-captain)
10	MF	DEN	Patrick Olsen
11	FW	RSA	Gift Links
13	DF	DEN	Alexander Munksgaard
14	FW	DEN	Søren Tengstedt
15	DF	GAM	Bubacarr Sanneh (on loan from Anderlecht)
16	DF	DEN	Casper Højer Nielsen
17	MF	ISL	Jón Dagur Þorsteinsson

No.	Pos.	Nation	Player
18	DF	DEN	Jesper Juelsgård
19	MF	AUS	Daniel Arzani (on loan from Manchester City)
20	MF	AUS	Zach Duncan
22	MF	DEN	Benjamin Hvidt
27	MF	DEN	Albert Grønbæk
29	MF	DEN	Bror Blume
31	GK	DEN	Kasper Kristensen
34	DF	NED	Kevin Diks (on loan from Fiorentina)
36	GK	DEN	Daniel Gadegaard Andersen
37	DF	DEN	Sebastian Hausner
38	FW	DEN	Alexander Ammitzbøll
39	DF	DEN	Magnus Anbo
73	GK	POL	Kamil Grabara (on loan from Liverpool)

== Transfers ==
=== In ===
Date	Position	No.	Name	From	Fee	Ref.
13 July 2020	FW	7	(Serbia) Milan Jevtović	(Serbia) Red Star Belgrade	Free	

=== Out ===
Date	Position	No.	Name	To	Fee	Ref.
14 December 2020	FW	–	(Denmark) Nicklas Helenius	(Denmark) Silkeborg	Undisclosed	
1 February 2021	MF	–	(Denmark) Magnus Kaastrup	(Denmark) Lyngby	Undisclosed	

=== Loans in ===
Date	Loan ends	Position	No.	Name	From	Ref.
28 September 2020	30 June 2021	GK	73	(Poland) Kamil Grabara	(England) Liverpool	
31 August 2020	30 June 2021	DF	34	(Netherlands) Kevin Diks	(Italy) Fiorentina	
8 December 2020	30 June 2021	FW	23	(Denmark) Mathias Jørgensen	(United States) New York Red Bulls	
25 January 2021	30 June 2021	DF	15	(The Gambia) Bubacarr Sanneh	(Belgium) Anderlecht	
26 January 2021	30 June 2021	MF	19	(Australia) Daniel Arzani	(England) Manchester City	

=== Loans out ===
Date	Loan ends	Position	No.	Name	To	Ref.
1 February 2021	30 June 2021	DF	23	(Denmark) Mikkel Lassen	(Denmark) Skive	

== Non-competitive friendlies ==
Win Draw Loss Fixtures

=== Mid-season ===
19 January 2021	AGF	0–2	Midtjylland	Aarhus
13:00 CEST				Stadium: Anlæg Kunstgræsbane 2 (Viby J)

27 January 2021	Copenhagen	6–1	AGF	Frederiksberg
13:00 CEST	Fischer 25'; Wind 57'; Bøving 95', 121'; Stamenic 109'; Haraldsson 129'	FCK Summary	Links 55'	Stadium: Nummer 10; Attendance: 0 (Stadium closed to the public); Referee: Benjamin Helm Svedborg

== Competitions ==
=== Overview ===
Competition	First match	Last match	Starting round	Final position	Record							
Competition	First match	Last match	Starting round	Final position	Pld	W	D	L	GF	GA	GD	Win %
Superliga	14 September 2020	May 2021	Matchday 1		22	10	8	4	35	22	+13	45.45
Danish Cup	12 November 2020		Third round		4	2	1	1	8	6	+2	50.00
Europa League	27 August 2020	17 September 2020	First qualifying round	Second qualifying round	2	1	0	1	5	5	+0	50.00
Total					28	13	9	6	48	33	+15	46.43

Last updated: 21 March 2021
Source: Soccerway

=== Danish Superliga ===
==== Results by matchday ====
Matchday	1	2	3	4	5	6	7	8	9	10	11	12	13	14	15	16	17	18	19	20	21	22
Ground	H	A	H	A	H	H	A	A	H	A	H	A	H	A	H	A	H	A	H	A	H	A
Result	W	D	W	D	W	L	D	W	L	L	W	W	W	D	W	D	W	D	L	W	D	D
Position	2	3	2	2	2	5	4	3	4	6	4	3	3	4	3	3	3	3	4	3	3	3

Updated to match(es) played on 21 March 2021. Source: Weltfussball
A = Away; H = Home; W = Win; D = Draw; L = Loss

==== Regular season ====
Pos	Team	Pld	W	D	L	GF	GA	GD	Pts	Qualification
1	Brøndby	22	14	3	5	40	24	+16	45	Qualification for the Championship round
2	Midtjylland	22	13	4	5	35	20	+15	43	Qualification for the Championship round
3	AGF	22	10	8	4	35	22	+13	38	Qualification for the Championship round
4	Copenhagen	22	10	5	7	39	35	+4	35	Qualification for the Championship round
5	Randers	22	9	5	8	31	21	+10	32	Qualification for the Championship round

Source: Danish Football Association (in Danish), Soccerway
Rules for classification: 1) Points; 2) Goal difference; 3) Goals scored; 4) Away goals scored; 5) Play-off (played on neutral ground if determining teams for different rounds); 6) Draw.

==== Championship round ====
Pos	Team	Pld	W	D	L	GF	GA	GD	Pts	Qualification	BRO	MID	COP	AGF	NOR	RAN
2	Midtjylland	32	18	6	8	57	33	+24	60	Qualification for the Champions League second qualifying round	1–0	—	4–1	4–0	3–0	1–1
3	Copenhagen	32	16	7	9	61	53	+8	55	Qualification for the Europa Conference League second qualifying round	2–1	4–2	—	3–2	2–2	2–1
4	AGF (O)	32	13	9	10	48	42	+6	48	Qualification for the European play-off match	1–2	1–4	1–2	—	3–1	2–0
5	Nordsjælland	32	11	10	11	51	51	0	43		0–3	3–2	2–2	2–0	—	2–1
6	Randers	32	11	7	14	43	38	+5	40	Qualification for the Europa League play-off round (Note: Randers qualified for the Europa League play-off round by winning the 2020–21 Danish Cup.)	4–2	0–0	2–1	0–1	3–4	—

Source: Danish Football Association (in Danish), Soccerway
Legend: Blue = home team win; Yellow = draw; Red = away team win.
Rules for classification: 1) Points; 2) Goal difference; 3) Goals scored; 4) Away goals scored; 5) Play-off (played on neutral ground if determining teams for different rounds); 6) Draw.
(O) Play-off winners

==== Matches ====
===== Regular season =====
14 September 2020 1	AGF	4–2	Vejle	Aarhus
19:00 CEST	Mortensen 9'; Tingager 17'; Þorsteinsson 58'; Hvidt 90+1'	Report	Dwamena 71'; Ojala 84'	Stadium: Ceres Park; Referee: Sandi Putros

20 September 2020 2	Randers	1–1	AGF	Randers
16:00 CEST	Kamara 87'	Report	Hausner (red card) 2'; Mortensen 90'	Stadium: Randers Stadium; Referee: Mikkel Redder

27 September 2020 3	AGF	4–2	OB	Aarhus
14:00 CEST	Grønbæk 4'; Blume 15'; Thorsteinsson (yellow card) 43'; Mortensen 71'; Højer 80'	Report	Tverskov (yellow card) 6'; Jebali 9', 74'; O. Lund (yellow card) 23'	Stadium: Ceres Park; Attendance: 300; Referee: Jens Grabski Maae

4 October 2020 4	AaB	1–1	AGF	Aalborg
16:00 CEST	Okore (yellow card) 39'; Ferreira (yellow card) 51'; Børsting 76'	Report	Mortensen 40' (pen.); Poulsen (yellow card) 58'; Olsen (yellow card) 77'	Stadium: Aalborg Stadium; Referee: Jørgen Burchardt

18 October 2020 5	AGF	3–0	Horsens	Aarhus
14:00 CEST	Grønbæk 31'; Mortensen 53'; Poulsen (yellow card) 63'; Nielsen 68'	Report	Buus (yellow card) 17'; Hansson (yellow card) 50'; Jacobsen (red card) 66'; Gemmer (yellow card) 89'; Finnbogason (penalty missed) 90+3'	Stadium: Ceres Park; Referee: Aydin Uslu

25 October 2020 6	AGF	0–1	Copenhagen	Aarhus
18:00 CEST	Poulsen (yellow card) 11' (yellow-red card) 61'; Hvidt (yellow card) 14'; Grabara (yellow card) 61'; Mortensen (yellow card) 62'; Links (yellow card) 90+4'	Report	Wind 9' (pen.); Zanka (yellow card) 12'; Kaufmann (yellow card) 28' (yellow-red card) 77'; Zeca (yellow card) 34'; Daramy (yellow card) 72'; Johnsson (yellow card) 90+3'	Stadium: Ceres Park; Attendance: 300; Referee: Mads-Kristoffer Kristoffersen

2 November 2020 7	SønderjyskE	1–1	AGF	Haderslev
19:00 CET	Wright (yellow card) 10'; Jacobsen 37' (pen.) (yellow card) 45'; Albæk (yellow card) 61'	Report	Blume 32' (yellow card) 58'; Olsen (yellow card) 63'; Helenius (yellow card) 90+3'	Stadium: Haderslev Football Stadium; Attendance: 300; Referee: Jørgen Burchardt

November 2020 8	Lyngby	1–2	AGF	Lyngby
CET	Torp 2' (yellow card) 90+3'; Thellufsen (yellow card) 19'; Gammelby (yellow card) 87'	Report	Diks 50'; Þorsteinsson 89'	Stadium: Lyngby Stadium; Attendance: 300; Referee: Morten Krogh

22 November 2020 9	AGF	1–2	Midtjylland	Aarhus
16:00 CET	Sviatchenko (yellow card) 25'; Onyeka 27' (yellow card) 51'; Kaba 34'	FCM Summary	Juelsgård (yellow card) 43'; Mortensen 63' (pen.)	Stadium: Ceres Park; Referee: Jens Maae

29 November 2020 10	AGF	1–3	Nordsjælland	Aarhus
18:00 CET	Mortensen 10'; Hvidt (yellow card) 90+5'	Report	Atanga 2', 57'; Sulemana 3' (yellow card) 45' (yellow-red card) 77'; Jensen (yellow card) 40'; Jenssen (yellow card) 53'	Stadium: Ceres Park; Attendance: 300; Referee: Peter Kjærsgaard-Andersen

7 December 2021 11	AGF	3–1	Brøndby	Aarhus
19:00 CET	Links 37'; Juelsgård (yellow card) 51'; Mortensen 78'	Report	Frendrup (yellow card) 11' (yellow-red card) 50'; Hedlund 45'; Bruus (yellow card) 72'; Grønbæk (yellow card) 76' (goal) 80'	Stadium: Ceres Park; Referee: Jorgen Burchardt

13 December 2020 12	Horsens	1–2	AGF	Horsens
14:00 CET	Hansson (yellow card) 46'; Brock-Madsen 67' (pen.)	Report	Links 42'; Diks 58' (yellow card) 83'; Þorsteinsson (yellow card) 64'; Munksgaard (yellow card) 76'	Stadium: CASA Arena Horsens; Attendance: 300; Referee: Jonas Hansen

20 December 2020 13	AGF	3–0	AaB	Aarhus
16:00 CET	Links 16'; Þorsteinsson 26', 34'; Nielsen (yellow card) 31'	Report	Thelander (yellow card) 23'; Ferreira (yellow card) 45'	Stadium: Ceres Park; Attendance: 300; Referee: Anders Poulsen

2 February 2021 14	Vejle	0–0	AGF	Vejle
20:00 CET	Ramadani (yellow card) 53'; Kolinger (yellow card) 60'; Mucoli (yellow card) 69'	Report	Poulsen (yellow card) 15'; Links (yellow card) 77'	Stadium: Vejle Stadium; Referee: Jens Maae

7 February 2021 15	AGF	1–0	Lyngby	Aarhus
18:00 CET	Þorsteinsson 50'	Report		Stadium: Ceres Park; Referee: Jakob A. Sundberg

14 February 2021 16	OB	0–0	AGF	Odense
20:00 CET	Thomasen (yellow card) 90+1'; Tverskov (yellow card) 90+4'	Report	Munksgaard (yellow card) 37'; Poulsen (yellow card) 43'; Hvidt (yellow card) 72'; Højer (yellow card) 90+3'	Stadium: Nature Energy Park; Attendance: 0 Referee: Peter Kjærsgaard-Andersen

21 February 2021 17	AGF	2–0	SønderjyskE	Aarhus
16:00 CET	Mortensen 74' (pen.); Olsen 80'	Report	Gartenmann (red card) 74'	Stadium: Ceres Park; Attendance: 0 Referee: Mads Kristoffersen

28 February 2021 18	Copenhagen	3–3	AGF	Copenhagen
16:00 CET	Wind 15'; Daramy 55'; Falk 90+11' (pen.); Lerager (yellow card) 76'; Boilesen (yellow card) 83'	FCK Summary	Mortensen 21', 27'; Olsen 29'; Poulsen (yellow card) 77'; Sanneh (yellow card) 85'; Jørgensen (yellow card) 90+6'	Stadium: Telia Parken; Attendance: 0 Referee: Jørgen Daugbjerg Burchardt

3 March 2021 19	AGF	0–1	Nordsjælland	Aarhus
18:00	Sanneh (red card) 6'	Report	Jenssen 13'	Stadium: Ceres Park; Attendance: 0 Referee: Morten Krogh

7 March 2021 20	Midtjylland	0–1	AGF	Herning
16:00 CET		Report	Mortensen 9'	Stadium: MCH Arena; Attendance: 0 Referee: Peter Kjærsgaard-Andersen; Fourth official: ydin Uslu

15 March 2021 21	AGF	1–1	Randers	Aarhus
19:00 CET	Links 5'; Juelsgård (yellow card) 48'; Mortensen (yellow card) 87'; Olsen (yellow card) 90+3'	Report	Piesinger (yellow card) 64'; Kopplin (yellow card) 81'; Mistrati 90'; Kehinde (yellow card) 90+2'	Stadium: Aarhus Stadium; Attendance: 0 Referee: Michael Tykgaard; Fourth official: Peter Kjærsgaard-Andersen

21 March 2021 22	Brøndby	1–1	AGF	Brøndbyvester
17:00 CET	Uhre 36'	Report	Mortensen 34' (pen.)	Stadium: Brøndby Stadium; Attendance: 0 Referee: Jørgen Burchardt

===== Championship round =====
4 April 2021 23	Nordsjaelland	2–0	AGF	Farum
18:05	Sulemana 18'; Antman 87'	Report		Stadium: Right to Dream Park; Referee: Jakob A. Sundberg

11 April 2021 24	AGF	1–4	Midtjylland	Aarhus
18:00 CEST	Grønbæk (yellow card) 44'; Olsen (yellow card) 45+5'; Mortensen (yellow card) 45+4' (goal) 61'; Links (yellow card) 56'; Hvidt (yellow card) 58'; Juelsgård (yellow card) 88'	FCM Summary	Onyeka 16'; Dreyer (yellow card) 43'; Scholz (yellow card) 45+4' (goal) 52' (pen.); Anderson 83' (Isaksen); Evander 89'	Stadium: Aarhus Stadium; Attendance: 0 Referee: Peter Kjærsgaard-Andersen

18 April 2021 25	Brøndby	2–2	AGF	Brøndbyvester
18:00	Maxsø 31' (pen.); Lindstrøm 71'; Børkeeiet (yellow card) 90+2' (yellow-red card) 90+2'	Report	Diks 16'; Grønbæk 45'	Stadium: Brøndby Stadium; Referee: Jens Maae

22 April 2021 26	AGF	2–0	Randers	Aarhus
17:45 CEST	Grønbæk 7'; Ammitzbøll 90+3'	Report		Stadium: Aarhus Stadium; Attendance: 0 Referee: Sandi Putros

25 April 2021 27	AGF	1–2	Copenhagen	Aarhus
20:00 CET	Højer 31'; Hvidt (yellow card) 90+3'; Hausner (yellow card) 90+5'; Grabara (yellow card) 90+5'	FCK Summary	Wind 26' (Stage); Ankersen (yellow card) 29'; Lerager (yellow card) 39'; Stage 38' (Fischer); Zeca (yellow card) 85'; Nelsson (yellow card) 90+5'	Stadium: Aarhus Stadium; Attendance: 8,500; Referee: Morten Krogh

3 May 2021 28	Copenhagen	3–2	AGF	Copenhagen
19:00 CEST	Wilczek 7' (Fischer); Nelsson 17' (yellow card) 68'; Wind 33' (pen.); Zanka (yellow card) 39'; Kristiansen (yellow card) 90'; Stage (yellow card) 90+4'	FCK Summary	Juelsgård (yellow card) 19'; Þorsteinsson (yellow card) 37'; Diks 57' (Højer) 67' (Hausner); Poulsen (yellow card) 61'	Stadium: Parken Stadium; Attendance: 10,365; Referee: Peter Kjærsgaard

9 May 2021 29	Randers	0–1	AGF	Randers
16:00 CEST		Report	Diks 22'	Stadium: Randers Stadium; Referee: Michael Tykgaard

24 May 2021 32	Midtjylland	v	AGF	Herning
17:00 CEST				Stadium: MCH Arena

=== Danish Cup ===
12 November 2020 Third round	Kolding IF	3–3 (a.e.t.) (3–4 p)	AGF	Kolding
	Hansen 4'; Grabara 8' (o.g.); Jakobsen 63'	Report	Juelsgård 43'; Helenius 46'; Mortensen 57'	Stadium: Kolding Stadium
	Penalties
	Nautrup (penalty missed); Gudmann (penalty scored); Eriksen (penalty scored); Bonde (penalty scored); Sommer (penalty missed)		(penalty scored) Mortensen; (penalty scored) Olsen; (penalty missed) Poulsen; (penalty scored) Hvidt; (penalty scored) Tingager

16 December 2020 Fourth round	AGF	1–0	Horsens	Aarhus
	Tingager 87'	Report		Stadium: Aarhus Stadium

10 February 2021 Quarter-finals 1st leg	AGF	3–1	B 93	Aarhus
20:15 CET	Þorsteinsson 39'; Gersbach 49'; Links 79'	Report	Stückler 90+3'	Stadium: Aarhus Stadium; Referee: Jørgen Daugbjerg Burchardt

11 March 2021 Quarter-finals 2nd leg	B 93	2–1 (3–4 agg.)	AGF	Copenhagen
18:45 CET	Erenbjerg 5'; Lund 90+2'	Report	Diks 80'	Stadium: Østerbro Stadium; Attendance: 0 Referee: Sandi Putros

8 April 2021 Semi-finals 1st leg	AGF	0–2	Randers	Aarhus
19:00 CEST	Hausner (yellow card) 70'	Report	Hammershøy-Mistrati 66'; Egho 71' (pen.)	Stadium: Aarhus Stadium; Attendance: 0 Referee: Michael Tykgaard

15 April 2021 Semi-finals 2nd leg	Randers	1–1 (3–1 agg.)	AGF	Randers
19:00 CEST	Egho 41'; Marxen (yellow card) 90+2'	Report	Mortensen 24'; Links (yellow card) 54'	Stadium: Randers Stadium; Attendance: 0 Referee: Mads-Kristoffer Kristoffersen

=== UEFA Europa League ===
27 August 2020 First qualifying round	AGF (Denmark)	5–2	(Finland) Honka	Aarhus Stadium, Aarhus
19:00	Tingager 21'; Mortensen 29', 45+2' (pen.); Olsen 90+1'; Tengstedt 90+2'	Report	Martín 35'; Kaufmann 64'	Attendance: 0 Referee: Ioannis Papadopoulos (Greece)

17 September 2020 Second qualifying round	Mura (Slovenia)	3–0	(Denmark) AGF	Fazanerija City Stadium, Murska Sobota
20:15	Gorenc 37'; Žižek 72'; Maroša 90+5'	Report		Attendance: 0 Referee: Giorgi Kruashvili (Georgia)

== Statistics ==
=== Goalscorers ===
Rank	No.	Pos	Nat	Name	Superliga	Danish Cup	Europa League	Total
1	9	FW	(Denmark)	Patrick Mortensen	13	1	2	16
2	17	FW	(Iceland)	Jón Dagur Þorsteinsson	5	1	0	6
3	11	FW	(South Africa)	Gift Links	4	1	0	5
4	5	DF	(Denmark)	Frederik Tingager	1	1	1	3
4	10	MF	(Denmark)	Patrick Olsen	2	0	1	3
4	27	MF	(Denmark)	Albert Grønbæk	3	0	0	3
4	34	DF	(Netherlands)	Kevin Diks	2	1	0	3
8	16	DF	(Denmark)	Casper Højer Nielsen	2	0	0	2
8	29	MF	(Denmark)	Bror Blume	2	0	0	2
10	2	DF	(Australia)	Alex Gersbach	0	1	0	1
10	14	FW	(Denmark)	Søren Tengstedt	0	0	1	1
10	18	DF	(Denmark)	Jesper Juelsgård	0	1	0	1
10	19	FW	(Denmark)	Nicklas Helenius	0	1	0	1
10	22	MF	(Denmark)	Benjamin Hvidt	1	0	0	1
Own goals					0	0	0	0
Totals					35	8	5	48

Last updated: 21 March 2021

=== Clean sheets ===
Rank	No.	Pos	Nat	Name	Superliga	Danish Cup	Europa League	Total
1	73	GK	(Poland)	Kamil Grabara	7	1	0	8
2	1	GK	(Sweden)	William Eskelinen	0	0	0	0
Totals					7	1	0	8

Last updated: 15 March 2021
