= 2019–20 FC Midtjylland season =

FC Midtjylland
2019–20 season
- Owner: Matthew Benham
- Chairman: Rasmus Ankersen
- Manager: Brian Priske
- Stadium: MCH Arena
- Superliga: 1st
- Danish Cup: Third round
- UEFA Europa League: Third qualifying round
- Top goalscorer: League: Awer Mabil; Evander (8 each); All: Evander (9 goals)
| Home colours | Away colours | European away colours |

The 2019–20 FC Midtjylland season was FC Midtjylland's 21st season of existence, and their 19th consecutive season in the Superliga, the top tier of football in Denmark. As a result of the club's first ever Danish Cup win the previous season, it competed in the 2019–20 UEFA Europa League and had the opportunity to defending its cup title in the 2019–20 Danish Cup, but lost in the Third Round. The season was interrupted by the COVID-19 pandemic, and matches were stopped after matches on March 8 and resumed on June 1.

The club captured its third-ever Danish Superliga title, clinching the championship on 9 July 2020, with a decisive 3-1 over 2018-19 Champion F.C. København.

== Squad ==
As of 17 February 2020

| No. | Name | Nat | Position | Since | Date of birth | Signed from |
Goalkeepers
| 1 | Jesper Hansen | (Denmark) | GK | 2017 | 31 March 1985 | (Denmark) Lyngby BK |
| 30 | Oliver Ottesen | (Denmark) | GK | 2017 | 22 August 1998 | (Denmark) Roskilde |
| 31 | Mikkel Andersen | (Denmark) | GK | 2018 | 17 December 1988 | (Denmark) Lyngby BK |
Defenders
| 2 | Dion Cools | (Belgium) (Malaysia) | DF | 2020 | 4 June 1996 | (Belgium) Club Brugge |
| 4 | Zsolt Korcsmár | (Hungary) | DF | 2017 | 9 January 1989 | (Hungary) Vasas SC |
| 5 | Marc Dal Hende | (Denmark) | DF | 2017 | 6 November 1990 | (Denmark) SønderjyskE |
| 6 | Joel Andersson | (Sweden) | DF | 2018 | 11 November 1996 | (Sweden) BK Häcken |
| 14 | Alexander Scholz | (Denmark) (Germany) | DF | 2018 | 24 October 1992 | (Belgium) Club Brugge |
| 18 | Kristian Riis | (Denmark) | DF | 2016 | 17 February 1997 | Homegrown |
| 20 | Rasmus Nicolaisen | (Denmark) | DF | 2017 | 16 March 1997 | Homegrown |
| 25 | Manjrekar James | (Canada) (Dominica) | DF | 2018 | 5 August 1993 | (Denmark) FC Fredericia |
| 27 | Oliver Olsen | (Denmark) | DF | 2018 | 13 August 2000 | (Denmark) Esbjerg fB Youth |
| 28 | Erik Sviatchenko | (Denmark) | DF | 2018 | 4 October 1991 | (Scotland) Celtic F.C. |
| 29 | Paulinho | (Brazil) | DF | 2019 | 3 January 1995 | (Brazil) Bahia |
| 44 | Nikolas Dyhr | (Denmark) | DF | 2019 | 18 June 2001 | (Denmark) FC Midtjylland U19 |
Midfielders
| 3 | Tim Sparv | (Finland) | MF | 2014 | 20 February 1987 | (Germany) Greuther Fürth |
| 10 | Evander | (Brazil) | MF | 2018 | 9 June 1998 | (Brazil) CR Vasco da Gama |
| 11 | Awer Mabil | (Australia) | MF | 2015 | 15 September 1995 | (Australia) Adelaide United FC |
| 34 | Mikael Anderson | (Iceland) | MF | 2019 | 1 July 1998 | (Netherlands) SBV Excelsior |
| 36 | Anders Dreyer | (Denmark) | MF | 2020 | 2 May 1998 | (England) Brighton & Hove Albion F.C. |
| 38 | Frank Onyeka | (Nigeria) | MF | 2017 | 1 January 1998 | (Nigeria) F.C. Ebedei |
| 40 | Jens-Lys Cajuste | (Sweden) | MF | 2018 | 10 August 1999 | (Sweden) Örgryte IS |
| 43 | Nicolas Madsen | (Denmark) | MF | 2017 | 17 March 2000 | Homegrown |
Forwards
| 9 | Sory Kaba | (Guinea) | FW | 2019 | 28 July 1995 | (France) Dijon FCO |
| 26 | Lasse Vibe | (Denmark) | FW | 2020 | 22 February 1987 | (Sweden) IFK Göteborg |
| 45 | Gustav Isaksen | (Denmark) | FW | 2019 | 19 April 2001 | Homegrown |
| 89 | Ronnie Schwartz | (Denmark) | FW | 2020 | 29 Aug 1989 | (Denmark) Silkeborg IF |

== Transfers and loans ==
From July 1, 2019. Arrivals include players returning from loans. Departures include players out on loan.

=== Arrivals ===
==== Summer ====
| Position | Player | Transferred from | Date | Fee |
|---|---|---|---|---|
| MF | (Brazil) Evander | CR Vasco da Gama | July 1, 2019 | £2.25m |
| DF | (Brazil) Paulinho | Esporte Clube Bahia | July 1, 2019 | £630k |
| DF | (Denmark) Nikolas Dyhr | FC Midtjylland U19 | July 1, 2019 | Internal |
| FW | (Denmark) Gustav Isaksen | FC Midtjylland U19 | July 1, 2019 | Internal |
| DF | (Denmark) Japhet Sery Larsen | FC Midtjylland U19 | July 1, 2019 | Internal |
| FW | (Guinea) Sory Kaba | Dijon FCO | July 5, 2019 | £2.70m |
| DF | (Denmark) Nikolaj Kirk | Stabæk Fotball | July 25, 2019 | End of loan |
| DF | (Norway) Chuma Anene | FK Jerv | July 31, 2019 | End of loan |
| FW | (Denmark) Emiliano Marcondes | Brentford F.C. | September 2, 2019 | On Loan |

==== Winter ====
| Position | Player | Transferred from | Date | Fee |
|---|---|---|---|---|
| MF | (Finland) Kaan Kairinen | HJK Helsinki | Dec 31, 2019 | End of loan |
| MF | (Denmark) Sammy Skytte | Stabæk Fotball | Dec 31, 2019 | End of loan |
| MF | (Denmark) Sammy Skytte | Stabæk Fotball | Dec 31, 2019 | End of loan |
| GK | (United States) Bill Hamid | D.C. United | Dec 31, 2019 | End of loan |
| FW | (Nigeria) Babajide David Akintola | Rosenborg BK | Dec 31, 2019 | End of loan |
| FW | (Costa Rica) Mayron George | Vålerenga | Dec 31, 2019 | End of loan |
| DF | (Denmark) Kristian Riis | Esbjerg fB | Dec 31, 2019 | End of loan |
| FW | (Faroe Islands) Jákup Thomsen | FH | Dec 31, 2019 | End of loan |
| MF | (Ghana) Michael Baidoo | FK Jerv | Dec 31, 2019 | End of loan |
| FW | (Denmark) Lasse Vibe | IFK Göteborg | Jan 1, 2020 | Free Transfer |
| MF | (Denmark) Anders Dreyer | Brighton & Hove Albion F.C. | Jan 6, 2020 | Undisclosed |
| FW | (Denmark) Ronnie Schwartz | Silkeborg IF | Jan 31, 2020 | £400k |
| DF | (Belgium) (Malaysia) Dion Cools | Club Brugge KV | Jan 31, 2020 | £1.0m |

=== Departures ===
==== Summer ====
| Position | Player | Transferred to | Date | Fee |
|---|---|---|---|---|
| MF | (Denmark) Christian Tue Jensen | Brentford B | July 1, 2019 | Out on loan |
| FW | (Nigeria) Rilwan Hassan | SønderjyskE | July 1, 2019 | Free Transfer |
| DF | (Denmark) Japhet Sery Larsen | Brentford B | July 2, 2019 | Out on loan |
| FW | (Denmark) Kian Hansen | FC Nordsjælland | July 19, 2019 | £855k |
| MF | (Democratic Republic of the Congo) Gloire Rutikanga | Ringkøbing IF | July 19, 2019 | Out on loan |
| FW | (Denmark) Sebastian Buch | Skive IK | July 20, 2019 | Out on loan |
| MF | (Bulgaria) Bozhidar Kraev | Gil Vicente F.C. | July 24, 2019 | Out on loan |
| DF | (Denmark) Nikolaj Kirk | FC Fredericia | July 26, 2019 | Out on loan |
| DF | (Nigeria) Henry Uzochokwu | FC Fredericia | July 26, 2019 | Out on loan |
| MF | (Denmark) Sammy Skytte | Stabæk Fotball | August 1, 2019 | Out on loan |
| FW | (Costa Rica) Mayron George | Vålerenga Fotball | August 3, 2019 | Out on loan |
| DF | (Denmark) Mads Døhr Thychosen | FC Nordsjælland | August 8, 2019 | Undisclosed |
| FW | (Nigeria) Paul Onuachu | KRC Genk | August 22, 2019 | £5.40m |
| MF | (Denmark) Jakob Poulsen | Melbourne Victory FC | September 1, 2019 | Undisclosed |
| MF | (Denmark) Gustav Wikheim | Without Club | September 1, 2019 | None |
| FW | (Ukraine) Artem Dovbyk | SønderjyskE | September 2, 2019 | Out on loan |

==== Winter ====
| Position | Player | Transferred to | Date | Fee |
|---|---|---|---|---|
| MF | (Denmark) (Brazil) Emiliano Marcondes | Brentford F.C. | December 31, 2019 | End of loan |
| GK | (United States) Bill Hamid | D.C. United | January 1, 2020 | Undisclosed |
| FW | (Costa Rica) Mayron George | Budapest Honvéd FC | January 15, 2020 | Out on loan |
| MF | (Denmark) Søren Reese | Esbjerg fB | January 16, 2020 | Out on loan |
| MF | (Ghana) Michael Baidoo | FK Jerv | January 20, 2020 | Out on loan |
| MF | (Denmark) Victor Torp | FC Fredericia | January 27, 2020 | Out on loan |
| MF | (Nigeria) Babajide David Akintola | AC Omonia | January 31, 2020 | Out on loan |
| MF | (Brazil) Júnior Brumado | Silkeborg IF | January 31, 2020 | Out on loan |
| MF | (Finland) Kaan Kairinen | Lillestrøm SK | Feb 5, 2020 | Out on loan |
| MF | (Denmark) Sammy Skytte | FK Bodø/Glimt | Feb 25, 2020 | £400k |
| FW | (Faroe Islands) Jákup Thomsen | D.C. United | Mar 12, 2020 | Free Transfer |

== Non-competitive ==
=== Pre-season Friendlies ===
| 28 June 2019 | FC Midtjylland (Denmark) | 0–2 | (Denmark) Esbjerg fB | Børkop, Denmark |
| 18:00 CEST | | | 1' Egelund; 19' Halsti | Stadium: Gauerslund Stadion |

| 3 July 2019 | FC Midtjylland (Denmark) | 4–3 | (Netherlands) SBV Vitesse | Opalenica, Poland |
| 17:00 CEST | Wikheim 6'; Brumado 37'; Mabil 59'; Dovbyk 72' | | 51', 53', 57' Darfalou | Stadium: Stadion Miejski |

| 6 July 2019 | Lech Poznań (Poland) | 2–1 | (Denmark) FC Midtjylland | Poznań, Poland |
| 17:00 CEST | Kostevych 35'; Jevtić 57' | | 54' Paulinho | Stadium: Bocznym Boisku przy ulicy Bułgarskiej |

== Competitive ==
=== Competition record ===
| Competition | Record | | | | | | | |
| Competition | G | W | D | L | GF | GA | GD | Win % |
|---|---|---|---|---|---|---|---|---|
| Superliga | 36 | 26 | 4 | 6 | 61 | 29 | +32 | 72.22 |
| Danish Cup | 1 | 0 | 0 | 1 | 0 | 1 | −1 | 0.00 |
| Europa League | 2 | 0 | 0 | 2 | 3 | 7 | −4 | 0.00 |
| Total | 39 | 26 | 4 | 9 | 64 | 37 | +27 | 66.67 |

Last updated: 26 July 2020.
Source: Competitive matches

=== Danish Superliga ===
==== Regular season ====
| Pos | Team | Pld | W | D | L | GF | GA | GD | Pts | Qualification |
|---|---|---|---|---|---|---|---|---|---|---|
| 1 | Midtjylland | 26 | 21 | 2 | 3 | 42 | 14 | +28 | 65 | Qualification for the Championship round |
| 2 | Copenhagen | 26 | 18 | 2 | 6 | 47 | 29 | +18 | 56 | Qualification for the Championship round |
| 3 | AGF | 26 | 14 | 5 | 7 | 42 | 28 | +14 | 47 | Qualification for the Championship round |
| 4 | Brøndby | 26 | 13 | 3 | 10 | 47 | 37 | +10 | 42 | Qualification for the Championship round |
| 5 | Nordsjælland | 26 | 12 | 5 | 9 | 48 | 35 | +13 | 41 | Qualification for the Championship round |

Source: Danish Football Association (in Danish), Soccerway
Rules for classification: 1) Points; 2) Goal difference; 3) Goals scored; 4) Away goals scored; 5) Play-off (played on neutral ground if determining teams for different rounds); 6) Draw.

==== Championship Round ====
| Pos | Team | Pld | W | D | L | GF | GA | GD | Pts | Qualification | MID | COP | AGF | BRO | AaB | NOR |
|---|---|---|---|---|---|---|---|---|---|---|---|---|---|---|---|---|
| 1 | Midtjylland (C) | 36 | 26 | 4 | 6 | 61 | 29 | +32 | 82 | Qualification for the Champions League second qualifying round | — | 3–1 | 3–4 | 0–0 | 1–2 | 6–3 |
| 2 | Copenhagen | 36 | 21 | 5 | 10 | 58 | 42 | +16 | 68 | Qualification for the Europa League second qualifying round | 1–2 | — | 2–4 | 0–0 | 2–0 | 2–1 |
| 3 | AGF (O) | 36 | 19 | 7 | 10 | 58 | 41 | +17 | 64 | Qualification for the European play-off match | 3–0 | 1–0 | — | 0–1 | 1–4 | 2–1 |
| 4 | Brøndby | 36 | 16 | 8 | 12 | 56 | 42 | +14 | 56 | | 1–1 | 1–1 | 0–0 | — | 0–1 | 4–0 |
| 5 | AaB | 36 | 16 | 6 | 14 | 54 | 44 | +10 | 54 | | 0–2 | 0–1 | 1–0 | 2–0 | — | 0–4 |
| 6 | Nordsjælland | 36 | 13 | 8 | 15 | 59 | 54 | +5 | 47 | | 0–1 | 1–1 | 1–1 | 0–2 | 0–0 | — |

Source: Danish Football Association (in Danish), Soccerway
Legend: Blue = home team win; Yellow = draw; Red = away team win.
(C) Champions; (O) Play-off winners

===== Matches =====
| 12 July 2019 Round 1 | FC Midtjylland | 1–0 | Esbjerg fB | Herning |
| 19:00 CEST | Okusun (yellow card) 18'; Anderson 90' | Summary | (yellow card) 31' Petre; (yellow card) 70' Sørensen | Stadium: MCH Arena; Attendance: 7,310; Referee: Anders Poulsen |

| 21 July 2019 Round 2 | FC Midtjylland | 2–1 | FC Nordsjælland | Herning |
| 18:00 CEST | Evander 28' (pen.); Nicolaisen (yellow card) 42'; Okosun 56'; Cajuste (yellow card) 89' | Summary | 6' (Francis) Atanga; (yellow card) 11' Mumin; (yellow card) 19' Jenssen; (yellow card) 44' Donyoh; (yellow card) 88' Sadiq | Stadium: MCH Arena; Attendance: 6,142; Referee: Jens Maae |

| 28 July 2019 Round 3 | AGF Aarhus | 0–1 | FC Midtjylland | Aarhus |
| 16:00 CEST | Munksgaard (yellow card) 24'; Eskelinen (yellow card) 87'; Juelsgård (yellow card) 90+2' | Summary | (yellow card) 26' Nicolaisen; (yellow card) 80' Cajuste; (yellow card) 82' Scholz; 88' (pen.) Evander; (yellow card) 90+2'Kaba; (yellow card) 90+2'Anderson | Stadium: Ceres Park; Attendance: 11,739; Referee: Mads-Kristoffer Kristoffersen |

| 4 August 2019 Round 4 | FC Midtjylland | 1–0 | AaB | Herning |
| 18:00 CEST | Sviatchenko (yellow card) 51' (yellow-red card) 54'; Onyeka (yellow card) 57'; Evander 89' | Summary | (yellow card) 84' Pedersen | Stadium: MCH Arena; Attendance: 7,965; Referee: Morten Krogh |

| 11 August 2019 Round 5 | AC Horsens | 0–2 | FC Midtjylland | Horsens |
| 16:00 CEST | Nilsen (yellow card) 24' | Summary | 45+1' (pen.) 53' (Brumado) Kaba; (yellow card) 51' James; (yellow card) 69' Okoson; (yellow card) 90+5' Cajuste | Stadium: CASA Arena Horsens; Attendance: 3,179; Referee: Michael Tykgaard |

| 18 August 2019 Round 6 | FC Midtjylland | 1–1 | Hobro IK | Herning |
| 16:00 CEST | Anderson (yellow card) 45+1'; Sviatchenko (yellow card) 84' (goal) 90' (Evander) | Summary | 84' (pen.) Kirkevold; (yellow card) 89' Ahmedhodžić | Stadium: MCH Arena; Attendance: 6,978; Referee: Jakob Kehlet |

| 25 August 2019 Round 7 | SønderjyskE | 0–2 | FC Midtjylland | Haderslev |
| 16:00 CEST | Bah (yellow card) 43'; Luijckx (yellow card) 55'; Absalonsen (yellow card) 90+3' | Summary | 41' (Wikheim) Mabil; (yellow card) 45' Onyeka; 71' Evander; (yellow card) 87' Sviatchenko | Stadium: Sydbank Park; Attendance: 5,028; Referee: Peter Kjærsgaard-Andersen |

| 1 September 2019 Round 8 | FC Midtjylland | 1–0 | Brøndby IF | Herning |
| 18:00 CEST | Skipper 7' (o.g.); Onyeka (yellow card) 25'; Mabil (yellow card) 31' | Summary | (yellow card) 10' Lindstrøm | Stadium: MCH Arena; Attendance: 10,944; Referee: Jørgen Daugberg Burchardt |

| 15 September 2019 Round 9 | Lyngby BK | 0–3 | FC Midtjylland | Lyngby |
| 14:00 CEST | Geertsen (yellow card) 83' | Summary | Mabil 29' (Marcondes); Anderson 54'; Sviatchenko 66' (Evander); Kaba (yellow card) 83' | Stadium: Lyngby Stadion; Attendance: 4,139; Referee: Mads-Kristoffer Kristoffersen |

| 22 September 2019 Round 10 | FC København | 0–0 | FC Midtjylland | København |
| 18:00 CEST | Mabil (yellow card) 76' (yellow-red card) 90'; Andersson (yellow card) 78'; Evander (yellow card) 90+3'; Kaba (yellow card) 90+7' | Summary | (yellow card) 27' Fischer; (yellow card) 35' Sotiriou | Stadium: Telia Parken; Attendance: 24,464; Referee: Jakob Kehlet |

| 29 September 2019 Round 11 | FC Midtjylland | 0–1 | OB | Herning |
| 16:00 CEST | Kaba (yellow card) 21'; Brumado (yellow card) 89' | Summary | (yellow card) 33' Lund; (yellow card) 53' Andersen; 60' (Drachmann) Kadrii; (yellow card) 89' Leewuin | Stadium: MCH Arena; Attendance: 8,618; Referee: Jens Maae |

| 6 October 2019 Round 12 | Silkeborg IF | 1–2 | FC Midtjylland | Silkeborg |
| 18:00 CEST | Crone (yellow card) 41'; Lesniak (yellow card) 83'; Schwartz 90+2' (Ibsen) | Summary | 31' (Evander) Marcondes; (yellow card) 45+1' Onyeka; 67' (o.g.) Ibsen | Stadium: JYSK Park; Attendance: 4,773; Referee: Jakob Kehlet |

| 21 October 2019 Round 13 | FC Midtjylland | 2–1 | Randers FC | Herning |
| 19:00 CEST | Anderson 57' (Mabil); Cajuste 67' (Evander); Madsen (yellow card) 90+2' | Summary | (yellow card) 36' Kamara; 54' Piesinger; (yellow card) 73' Riis | Stadium: MCH Arena; Attendance: 7,410; Referee: Jakob Kehlet |

| 25 October 2019 Round 14 | Esbjerg fB | 1–2 | FC Midtjylland | Esbjerg |
| 19:00 CEST | Kristensen (yellow card) 35'; Yakovenko (yellow card) 54' (goal) 56' (Kauko); Kauko (yellow card) 90+4' | Summary | (yellow card) 7' Hansen; (yellow card) 32' Andersson; 67' (Mabil) Anderson; 67' (Marcondes) Scholz | Stadium: Blue Water Arena; Attendance: 4,637; Referee: Peter Kjærsgaard-Andersen |

| 3 November 2019 Round 15 | AaB | 0–1 | FC Midtjylland | Aalborg |
| 16:00 CEST | | Summary | Onyeka 11' | Stadium: Nordjyske Arena; Attendance: 6,305; Referee: Mads-Kristoffer Kristoffersen |

| 10 November 2019 Round 16 | FC Midtjylland | 4–1 | FC København | Herning |
| 18:00 CEST | Kaba 28' 52' (Evander); Evander 42' (Mabil); Sviatchenko 60' (Evander); Onyeka (yellow card) 72'; Brumado (yellow card) 84' | Summary | Stage (yellow card) 20'; N'Doye 56' | Stadium: MCH Arena; Attendance: 11,422; Referee: Jens Maae |

| 25 November 2019 Round 17 | OB | 1–2 | FC Midtjylland | Odense |
| 19:00 CEST | Kadrii 57' (Jebali) | Summary | Evander 24' (Sviatchenko) (yellow card) 90+2'; Onyeka (yellow card) 28'; Mabil 44' (Kaba); Brumado (yellow card) 90+4' | Stadium: Nature Energy Park; Attendance: 6,392; Referee: Jakob Kehlet |

| 2 December 2019 Round 18 | FC Midtjylland | 2–1 | Silkeborg IF | Herning |
| 19:00 CEST | Marcondes 15' (Andersson); Nicolaisen 73' (Sviatchenko); Brumado (yellow card) 77' | Summary | Holten 86' | Stadium: MCH Arena; Attendance: 6,612; Referee: Michael Tykgaard |

| 8 December 2019 Round 19 | Brøndby IF | 2–1 | FC Midtjylland | Brøndby Municipality, København |
| 18:00 CEST | Wilczek 64' (Larsson); Jung (yellow card) 73' | Summary | Anderson (yellow card) 45+2'; Marcondes (yellow card) 54'; Mabil 60' (Kaba) (yellow card) 87'; Onyeka 82' (yellow card) 90+2'; Kaba (yellow card) 90+8' | Stadium: Brøndby Stadion; Attendance: 13,317; Referee: Jørgen Daugberg Burchardt |

| 15 December 2019 Round 20 | FC Midtjylland | 1–3 | AGF Aarhus | Herning |
| 18:00 CEST | Mabil 35' (Kaba); Evander (yellow card) 90+3' (yellow-red card) 90+4' | Summary | Munksgaard (yellow card) 15'; Sviatchenko 46' (o.g.); Þorsteinsson 52' (Munksgaard); Blume 54' (Bundu); Duncan (yellow card) 82' | Stadium: MCH Arena; Attendance: 11,109; Referee: Mads Kristoffer-Kristoffersen |

| 17 February 2020 Round 21 | FC Midtjylland | 2–0 | Lyngby BK | Herning |
| 18:00 CEST | Dreyer; Mabil 72' (Sviatchenko) | Summary | Rømer (yellow card) 58' da Silva (yellow card) 80'; Corlu (yellow card) 88' | Stadium: MCH Arena; Attendance: 6,108; Referee: Morten Krogh |

| 21 February 2020 Round 22 | Hobro IK | 0–2 | FC Midtjylland | Hobro |
| 19:00 CEST | Babayan (yellow card) 83'; Louati (yellow card) 86' | Summary | Dreyer 55' (Schwartz); Schwartz 68' (Dreyer) | Stadium: DS Arena; Attendance: 2,071; Referee: Jakob Kehlet |

| 2 March 2020 Round 23 | FC Midtjylland | 3–0 | SønderjyskE | Herning |
| 19:00 CEST | Sviatchenko (yellow card) 17'; Mabil 21' (Evander); Paulinho 29'; Schwartz 44' (Mabil) (yellow card) 65'; Onyeka (yellow card) 86' | Summary | Absalonsen (yellow card) 67'; Jacobsen (yellow card) 71' | Stadium: MCH Arena; Attendance: 8,103; Referee: Jørgen Daugberg Burchardt |

| 8 March 2020 Round 24 | Randers FC | 0–2 | FC Midtjylland | Randers |
| 20:00 CEST | Kehinde (yellow card) 6' | Summary | Paulinho (yellow card) 14'; Onyeka 26' (Scholz); Hansen (yellow card) 28'; Evander 44' (pen.) | Stadium: Cepheus Park Randers; Attendance: 0 Referee: Mads-Kristoffer Kristoffersen |

| 1 June 2020 Round 25 | FC Midtjylland | 0–1 | AC Horsens | Herning |
| 16:00 CEST | Onyeka (yellow card) 53'; Vibe (yellow card) 76' | Summary | Prip 36' (Brock-Madsen)Gemmer (yellow card) 65' | Stadium: MCH Arena; Attendance: 0 Referee: Aydin Uslu |

| 7 June 2020 Round 26 | FC Nordsjælland | 0–1 | FC Midtjylland | Farum |
| 17:00 CEST | Andersen (yellow card) 28'; Jenssen (yellow card) 35' (yellow-red card) 81'; Rygaard (yellow card) 60'; Diomande (yellow card) 72' | Summary | Kaba 44' (Dreyer); Evander (yellow card) 70' | Stadium: Right to Dream Park; Attendance: 0 Referee: Jens Maae |

| 14 June 2020 Round 27 | AaB | 0–2 | FC Midtjylland | Aalborg |
| 14:00 CEST | van Weert (yellow card) 31'; Ahlmann (yellow card) 79'; Pedersen (yellow card) 85'; Kakeeto (yellow card) 90+3' | Summary | Sviatchenko 28' (Dreyer); Andersson 40'; Dal Hende (yellow card) 82'; Schwartz (yellow card) 90+1' | Stadium: Aalborg Portland Park; Attendance: 280; Referee: Peter Kjærsgaard-Andersen |

| 18 June 2020 Round 28 | FC Midtjylland | 0–0 | Brøndby IF | Herning |
| 18:00 CEST | Onyeka (yellow card) 33'; Anderson (yellow card) 87'; Scholz (yellow card) 90+3' | Summary | | Stadium: MCH Arena; Attendance: 300; Referee: Sandi Putros |

| 21 June 2020 Round 29 | FC Midtjylland | 3–4 | AGF Aarhus | Herning |
| 20:00 CEST | Scholz 30' (Vibe) (yellow card) 78'; Schwartz 46'; Ankersen 48' (o.g.); Cajuste (yellow card) 79'; Sviatchenko (yellow card) 86' | Summary | Þorsteinsson 28' (Højer) 77' (Diks); 83' (Links) (yellow card) 83'; Hvidt (yellow card) 43'; Diks (yellow card) 78'; Poulsen 90+4' (Þorsteinsson) | Stadium: MCH Arena; Attendance: 300; Referee: Peter Kjærsgaard-Andersen |

| 28 June 2020 Round 30 | FC København | 1–2 | FC Midtjylland | København |
| 20:00 CEST | Stage (yellow card) 25'; Paulinho 90+2' (o.g.); Mudražija (yellow card) 90+4' | Summary | Kaba 32'; Paulinho (yellow card) 60'; Vibe 86' (Mabil) | Stadium: Telia Parken; Attendance: 249; Referee: Jakob Kehlet |

| 5 July 2020 Round 31 | FC Nordsjælland | 0–1 | FC Midtjylland | Farum |
| 14:00 CEST | Sadiq (yellow card) 33'; Hansen (yellow card) 38'; Kamaldeen (yellow card) 48'; Thychosen (yellow card) 90+5' | Summary | Onyeka (yellow card) 39' (yellow-red card) 90+5'; Sviatchenko 49' (Dreyer); Madsen (yellow card) 77'; Cajuste (yellow card) 77' | Stadium: Right to Dream Park; Attendance: 847; Referee: Aydin Uslu |

| 9 July 2020 Round 32 | FC Midtjylland | 3–1 | FC København | Herning |
| 20:00 CEST | Mabil (yellow card) 32' (goal) 81' (Evander); Kaba 63' (pen.); Dreyer 79' (Andersson); Sviatchenko (yellow card) 85' | Summary | Daramy 22'; Zeca (yellow card) 62' | Stadium: MCH Arena; Attendance: 4,097; Referee: Jørgen Daugberg Burchardt |

| 12 July 2020 Round 33 | AGF Aarhus | 3–0 | FC Midtjylland | Aarhus |
| 20:00 CEST | Mortensen 8' (Højer) 74' (yellow card) 90+2'; Hvidt (yellow card) 27'; Højer 50' (Þorsteinsson); Blume (yellow card) 90' | Summary | Nicolaisen (yellow card) 23'; Cajuste (yellow card) 42'; Onyeka (yellow card) 78' | Stadium: Ceres Park; Attendance: 7,534; Referee: Mads-Kristoffer Kristoffersen |

| 17 July 2020 Round 34 | FC Midtjylland | 6–3 | FC Nordsjælland | Herning |
| 19:00 CEST | Schwartz 14' (pen.) 82' (pen.); Cajuste (yellow card) 25'; Andersson (yellow card) 45+3'; Dreyer 55' (Onyeka); Onyeka 57' (Dreyer); Sviatchenko 71' (Evander); Vibe 90+1' (Mabil) | Summary | Kamaldeen 10' 23' (Damsgaard); Thychosen (red card) 13'; Chukwuani 69' (Francis); Francis (yellow card) 81' | Stadium: MCH Arena; Attendance: 2,073; Referee: Sandi Putros |

| 22 July 2020 Round 35 | Brøndby IF | 1–1 | FC Midtjylland | Brøndby Municipality, København |
| 19:00 CEST | Uhre 13' (Hedlund); Jung (yellow card) 16'; Frendrup (yellow card) 80'; Rosted (yellow card) 90+4' | Summary | Schwartz 8' (Dreyer); Madsen (yellow card) 68' | Stadium: Brøndby Stadion; Attendance: 5,082; Referee: Morten Krogh |

| 26 July 2020 Round 36 | FC Midtjylland | 1–2 | AaB | Herning |
| 19:00 CEST | Evander 53' (pen.) | Summary | van Weert 18'; Olden 21' (Klitten); Klitten (yellow card) 24'; Pallesen (yellow card) 43' | Stadium: MCH Arena; Attendance: 4,793; Referee: Jakob Kehlet |

=== Danish Cup ===
==== Danish Cup Matches ====
| 25 September 2019 Third Round | Fremad Amager | 1–0 | FC Midtjylland | København |
| 10:00 | Gabel (yellow card) 35'; Atchou (yellow card) 51'; Iyede 66'; Engel (yellow card) 71'; Zubanivoic (yellow card) 90+4' | Summary | Cajuste (yellow card) 29' (yellow-red card) 53'; James (yellow card) 33'; Brumado (yellow card) 45'; Kaba (yellow card) 76'; Nicolaisen (yellow card) 78' | Stadium: Sundby Idrætspark; Referee: Benjamin Willaume-Jantzen |

=== UEFA Europa League ===
==== Third qualifying round ====
| Team 1 | Agg. | Team 2 | 1st leg | 2nd leg |
|---|---|---|---|---|
| Rangers F.C. (Scotland) | 7–3 | (Denmark) FC Midtjylland | 4–2 | 3–1 |

| 8 August 2019 First Leg | FC Midtjylland | 2–4 | Rangers F.C. | Herning |
| 20:00 CET | Nicolaisen (yellow card) 48'; Onyeka 58' (Wikheim); Kaba 63' (Evander); Evander (yellow card) 79' | Summary | 43' (Tavernier) (yellow card) 88' Morelos; (yellow card) 88' Aribo; 56' (Morelos) Katić; 70' (Morelos) Arfield; (yellow card) 79' Jack; (yellow card) 86' Flanagan | Stadium: MCH Arena; Attendance: 9,322; Referee: (Estonia) Kristo Tohver |

| 15 August 2019 Second Leg | Rangers F.C. | 3–1 | FC Midtjylland | Glasgow, Scotland |
| 20:45 CET | Morelos 14' (Ojo) 49' (Ojo); Tavernier (yellow card) 33'; Ojo 39' (Morelos); Kamara (yellow card) 79' | Summary | (yellow card) 45' Nicolaisen; (yellow card) 51' Scholz; (yellow card) 65' Mabil; 72' (Mabil) Evander; Kaba (yellow card) 76' | Stadium: Ibrox Stadium; Attendance: 47,184; Referee: (Italy) Marco Di Bello |

== Statistics ==
=== Appearances ===
As of 26 July 2020

Includes all competitive matches.

| Rnk | Pos | No. | Player | Superliga | Danish Cup | UEFA Europa League | Total |
|---|---|---|---|---|---|---|---|
| 1 | GK | 1 | (Denmark) Jesper Hansen | 34 | 1 | 2 | 37 |
| 1 | MF | 45 | (Australia) Awer Mabil | 34 | 1 | 2 | 37 |
| 3 | DF | 14 | (Denmark) Alexander Scholz | 34 | 0 | 2 | 36 |
| 4 | MF | 38 | (Nigeria) Frank Onyeka | 32 | 1 | 2 | 35 |
| 5 | 28 | DF | (Ukraine) Erik Sviatchenko | 32 | 0 | 2 | 34 |
| 5 | DF | 6 | (Sweden) Joel Andersson | 31 | 1 | 2 | 34 |
| 7 | MF | 10 | (Brazil) Evander | 30 | 1 | 2 | 33 |
| 7 | FW | 9 | (Guinea) Sory Kaba | 30 | 1 | 2 | 33 |
| 9 | MF | 34 | (Iceland) Mikael Anderson | 30 | 0 | 2 | 32 |
| 10 | MF | 40 | (Sweden) Jens-Lys Cajuste | 24 | 1 | 2 | 27 |
| 11 | DF | 29 | (Brazil) Paulinho | 19 | 1 | 0 | 20 |
| 12 | FW | 74 | (Brazil) Júnior Brumado | 17 | 1 | 1 | 19 |
| 12 | DF | 20 | (Denmark) Rasmus Nicolaisen | 16 | 1 | 2 | 19 |
| 14 | MF | 3 | (Finland) Tim Sparv | 16 | 0 | 2 | 18 |
| 15 | FW | 44 | (Denmark) Nikolas Dyhr | 15 | 1 | 0 | 16 |
| 15 | MF | 36 | (Denmark) Anders Dreyer | 16 | 0 | 0 | 16 |
| 17 | FW | 89 | (Denmark) Ronnie Schwartz | 15 | 0 | 0 | 15 |
| 18 | FW | 45 | (Denmark) Gustav Isaksen | 13 | 0 | 0 | 13 |
| 18 | FW | 26 | (Denmark) Lasse Vibe | 13 | 0 | 0 | 13 |
| 20 | MF | 91 | (Denmark) Emiliano Marcondes | 12 | 0 | 0 | 12 |
| 21 | MF | 88 | (Norway) Gustav Wikheim | 8 | 1 | 2 | 11 |
| 22 | MF | 43 | (Denmark) Nicolas Madsen | 9 | 1 | 0 | 10 |
| 23 | DF | 5 | (Denmark) Marc Dal Hende | 9 | 0 | 0 | 9 |
| 24 | DF | 25 | (Canada) Manjrekar James | 5 | 1 | 0 | 6 |
| 25 | MF | 8 | (Denmark) Ayo Simon Okosun | 5 | 0 | 0 | 5 |
| 25 | DF | 2 | (Belgium) Dion Cools | 5 | 0 | 0 | 5 |
| 27 | FW | 26 | (Ukraine) Artem Dovbyk | 3 | 0 | 1 | 4 |
| 28 | MF | 49 | (Denmark) Aral Simsir | 3 | 0 | 0 | 3 |
| 28 | GK | 31 | (Denmark) Mikkel Andersen | 3 | 0 | 0 | 3 |
| 30 | MF | 24 | (Denmark) Oliver Sørensen Jensen | 2 | 0 | 0 | 2 |
| 31 | DF | 2 | (Denmark) Kian Hansen | 1 | 0 | 0 | 1 |
| 31 | MF | 7 | (Denmark) Jakob Poulsen | 1 | 0 | 0 | 1 |

=== Goalscorers ===
As of 26 July 2020

This includes all competitive matches.

| Rnk | Pos | No. | Player | Superliga | Danish Cup | UEFA Europa League | Total |
|---|---|---|---|---|---|---|---|
| 1 | MF | 10 | (Brazil) Evander | 8 | 0 | 1 | 9 |
| 2 | MF | 11 | (Australia) Awer Mabil | 8 | 0 | 0 | 8 |
| 2 | FW | 9 | (Guinea) Sory Kaba | 7 | 0 | 1 | 8 |
| 4 | DF | 28 | (Denmark) Erik Sviatchenko | 6 | 0 | 0 | 6 |
| 4 | FW | 99 | (Denmark) Ronnie Schwartz | 6 | 0 | 0 | 6 |
| 6 | MF | 38 | (Nigeria) Frank Onyeka | 4 | 0 | 1 | 5 |
| 7 | MF | 34 | (Iceland) Mikael Anderson | 4 | 0 | 0 | 4 |
| 7 | MF | 36 | (Denmark) Anders Dreyer | 4 | 0 | 0 | 4 |
| 9 | MF | 31 | (Denmark) Emiliano Marcondes | 2 | 0 | 0 | 2 |
| 9 | DF | 14 | (Denmark) Alexander Scholz | 2 | 0 | 0 | 2 |
| 9 | FW | 26 | (Denmark) Lasse Vibe | 2 | 0 | 0 | 2 |
| 11 | MF | 8 | (Denmark) Ayo Simon Okosun | 1 | 0 | 0 | 1 |
| 11 | MF | 40 | (Sweden) Jens-Lys Cajuste | 1 | 0 | 0 | 1 |
| 11 | DF | 20 | (Denmark) Rasmus Nicolaisen | 1 | 0 | 0 | 1 |
| 11 | DF | 29 | (Brazil) Paulinho | 1 | 0 | 0 | 1 |
| 11 | DF | 6 | (Sweden) Joel Andersson | 1 | 0 | 0 | 1 |
| | O.G. | | Opponent Own goal | 3 | 0 | 0 | 3 |
| TOTALS | | | | 61 | 0 | 3 | 64 |

=== Assists ===
As of 26 July 2020

This includes all competitive matches.

| Rnk | Pos | No. | Player | Superliga | Danish Cup | UEFA Europa League | Total |
|---|---|---|---|---|---|---|---|
| 1 | MF | 10 | (Brazil) Evander | 7 | 0 | 1 | 8 |
| 2 | MF | 11 | (Australia) Awer Mabil | 6 | 0 | 1 | 7 |
| 3 | MF | 36 | (Denmark) Anders Dreyer | 6 | 0 | 0 | 6 |
| 4 | FW | 9 | (Guinea) Sory Kaba | 3 | 0 | 0 | 3 |
| 4 | DF | 28 | (Denmark) Erik Sviatchenko | 3 | 0 | 0 | 3 |
| 6 | MF | 88 | (Denmark) Gustav Wikheim | 1 | 0 | 1 | 2 |
| 6 | MF | 92 | (Denmark) Emiliano Marcondes | 2 | 0 | 0 | 2 |
| 6 | DF | 6 | (Denmark) Joel Andersson | 2 | 0 | 0 | 2 |
| 7 | FW | 74 | (Brazil) Júnior Brumado | 1 | 0 | 0 | 1 |
| 7 | DF | 29 | (Brazil) Paulinho | 1 | 0 | 0 | 1 |
| 7 | FW | 89 | (Denmark) Ronnie Schwartz | 1 | 0 | 0 | 1 |
| 7 | DF | 14 | (Denmark) (Germany) Alexander Scholz | 1 | 0 | 0 | 1 |
| 7 | FW | 26 | (Denmark) Lasse Vibe | 1 | 0 | 0 | 1 |
| 7 | MF | 38 | (Nigeria) Frank Onyeka | 1 | 0 | 0 | 1 |
| TOTALS | | | | 36 | 0 | 3 | 39 |

=== Clean Sheets ===
As of 26 July 2020

This includes all competitive matches.

| Rnk | Pos | No. | Player | Superliga | Danish Cup | UEFA Europa League | Total |
|---|---|---|---|---|---|---|---|
| 1 | GK | 1 | (Denmark) Jesper Hansen | 16 | 0 | 0 | 16 |
| 2 | GK | 31 | (Denmark) Mikkel Andersen | 1 | 0 | 0 | 1 |
| TOTALS | | | | 16 | 0 | 0 | 16 (one shared) |

=== Disciplinary record ===
As of 26 July 2020

This includes all competitive matches.

| Rnk | Pos. | No. | Player | Superliga | | Danish Cup | | UEFA Europa League | | Total | |
| Rnk | Pos. | No. | Player | Yellow card | Red card | Yellow card | Red card | Yellow card | Red card | Yellow card | Red card |
| 1 | MF | 38 | (Nigeria) Frank Onyeka | 12 | 1 | 0 | 0 | 0 | 0 | 12 | 1 |
| 2 | MF | 40 | (Sweden) Jens-Lys Cajuste | 7 | 0 | 2 | 1 | 0 | 0 | 9 | 1 |
| 3 | FW | 9 | (Guinea) Sory Kaba | 5 | 0 | 1 | 0 | 1 | 0 | 7 | 0 |
| 3 | MF | 10 | (Brazil) Evander | 5 | 1 | 0 | 0 | 1 | 0 | 6 | 1 |
| 3 | MF | 11 | (Australia) Awer Mabil | 5 | 1 | 0 | 0 | 1 | 0 | 6 | 1 |
| 3 | DF | 28 | (Denmark) Erik Sviatchenko | 6 | 1 | 0 | 0 | 0 | 0 | 6 | 1 |
| 7 | DF | 20 | (Denmark) Rasmus Nicolaisen | 3 | 0 | 1 | 0 | 2 | 0 | 6 | 0 |
| 8 | FW | 74 | (Brazil) Júnior Brumado | 4 | 0 | 1 | 0 | 0 | 0 | 5 | 0 |
| 9 | MF | 34 | (Iceland) Mikael Anderson | 4 | 0 | 0 | 0 | 0 | 0 | 4 | 0 |
| 10 | DF | 14 | (Germany) (Denmark) Alexander Scholz | 2 | 0 | 0 | 0 | 1 | 0 | 3 | 0 |
| 10 | DF | 6 | (Sweden) Joel Andersson | 3 | 0 | 0 | 0 | 0 | 0 | 3 | 0 |
| 10 | MF | 43 | (Denmark) Nicolas Madsen | 3 | 0 | 0 | 0 | 0 | 0 | 3 | 0 |
| 13 | MF | 8 | (Denmark) Ayo Simon Okosun | 2 | 0 | 0 | 0 | 0 | 0 | 2 | 0 |
| 13 | DF | 25 | (Canada) Manjrekar James | 1 | 0 | 1 | 0 | 0 | 0 | 2 | 0 |
| 13 | GK | 1 | (Denmark) Jesper Hansen | 2 | 0 | 0 | 0 | 0 | 0 | 2 | 0 |
| 13 | FW | 89 | (Denmark) Ronnie Schwartz | 2 | 0 | 0 | 0 | 0 | 0 | 2 | 0 |
| 13 | DF | 29 | (Brazil) Paulinho | 2 | 0 | 0 | 0 | 0 | 0 | 2 | 0 |
| 18 | MF | 91 | (Denmark) Emiliano Marcondes | 1 | 0 | 0 | 0 | 0 | 0 | 1 | 0 |
| 18 | FW | 26 | (Denmark) Lasse Vibe | 1 | 0 | 0 | 0 | 0 | 0 | 1 | 0 |
| 18 | DF | 5 | (Denmark) Marc Dal Hende | 1 | 0 | 0 | 0 | 0 | 0 | 1 | 0 |
| TOTALS | | | | 71 | 4 | 6 | 1 | 6 | 0 | 83 | 5 |

== Awards ==
=== Individual ===
| No. | Player | Award | Month | Source |
