= Emiliano Marcondes =

Danish footballer (born 1995)

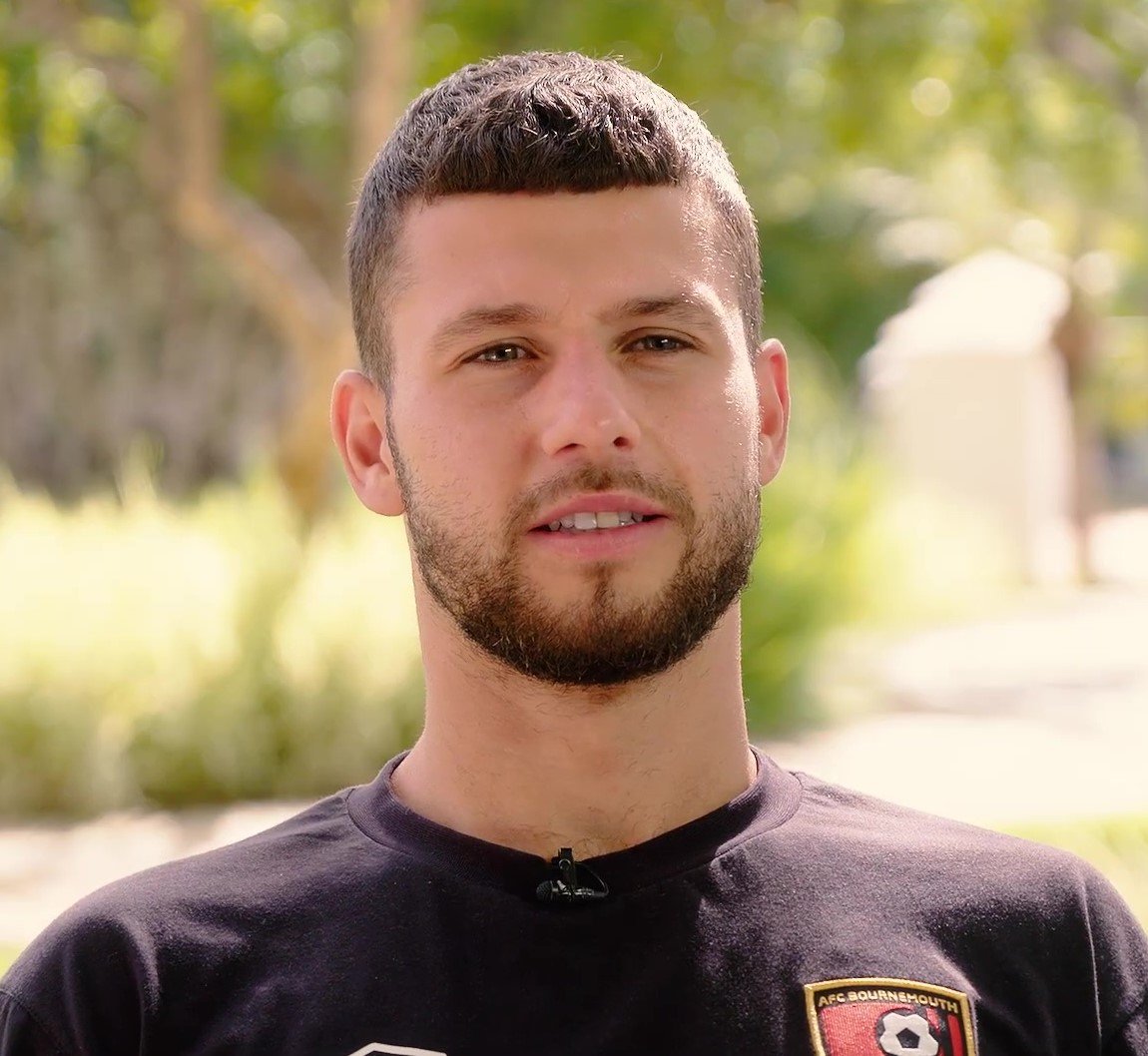
- Marcondes with AFC Bournemouth in 2021

Personal information
- Full name: Emiliano Marcondes Camargo Hansen
- Date of birth: 9 March 1995 (age 31)
- Place of birth: Hvidovre, Denmark
- Height: 1.82 m (6 ft 0 in)
- Position: Attacking midfielder

Team information
- Current team: Melbourne City
- Number: 10

Youth career
- –2010: Hvidovre
- 2010–2013: Nordsjælland

Senior career*
| Years | Team | Apps | (Gls) |
| 2013–2017 | Nordsjælland | 112 | (37) |
| 2018–2021 | Brentford | 81 | (3) |
| 2019 | → Midtjylland (loan) | 12 | (2) |
| 2021–2024 | Bournemouth | 18 | (2) |
| 2023 | → Nordsjælland (loan) | 8 | (3) |
| 2024 | → Hibernian (loan) | 15 | (3) |
| 2024–2026 | Norwich City | 49 | (6) |
| 2026– | Melbourne City | 0 | (0) |

International career
| 2011–2012 | Denmark U17 | 8 | (1) |
| 2012–2013 | Denmark U18 | 5 | (1) |
| 2013–2014 | Denmark U19 | 11 | (6) |
| 2012–2014 | Denmark U20 | 4 | (0) |
| 2015–2017 | Denmark U21 | 15 | (2) |
- * Club domestic league appearances and goals as of 16:55, 31 July 2026 (UTC)

Emiliano Marcondes Camargo Hansen (born 9 March 1995) is a Danish professional footballer who plays as an attacking midfielder for A-League Men club Melbourne City. He came to prominence at FC Nordsjælland and transferred to Brentford in 2018, with whom he was a member of the squad which was promoted to the Premier League in 2021. He was capped by Denmark at youth level.

== Club career ==
=== FC Nordsjælland ===
An attacking midfielder, Marcondes began his youth career with hometown club Hvidovre IF and transferred to the academy at Danish Superliga club FC Nordsjælland in 2010. He progressed through the youth ranks to win his maiden call into the first team squad for a league match versus AC Horsens on 16 July 2012 and remained an unused substitute during the 4–0 victory. Marcondes made his senior debut in the return match on 7 April 2013 and made two further appearances before the end of the 2012–13 season. Marcondes' development continued with 15 appearances during the 2013–14 season, in which he made three European appearances and scored his first senior goal, which came in a 3–1 victory over Viborg FF on 11 May 2014.

Marcondes made 24 appearances during the 2014–15 season and was thereafter an established member of the first team squad. He made a career-high 31 appearances during the 2015–16 season and scored 12 goals in 26 appearances during 2016–17. In July 2017, Marcondes signed a pre-contract agreement to depart the club on 31 December 2017. He had an excellent first half of the 2017–18 season, scoring 18 goals in 20 appearances and winning the November 2017 Danish Superliga Player of the Month award. With 17 league goals, he was top scorer of the Danish Superliga at the commencement of the winter break. Marcondes finished his career at Farum Park with 119 appearances and 38 goals. He was voted the Superliga Player of the Year at the 2017 Danish Football Awards.

=== Brentford ===
==== 2018–2019: Injury struggles ====
On 21 July 2017, Marcondes signed a pre-contract agreement to move to England and join Championship club Brentford on a 3 1/2-year contract in January 2018. He moved to London in December 2017 and officially transferred to the club on 1 January 2018. Mainly used in a substitute role, Marcondes made 13 appearances in what remained of the 2017–18 season. A foot injury suffered during the 2018–19 pre-season ruled Marcondes out until 24 November 2018, but he managed just three appearances before missing another three months of the season with an ankle ligament injury. He finished an injury-affected 2018–19 season with 13 appearances and no goals.

==== 2019–20 season: Loan to Midtjylland and return ====
After making five appearances during the first month of the 2019–20 season, personal reasons led to Marcondes' seeking a return to Denmark. On 2 September 2019, he joined Danish Superliga club FC Midtjylland, also owned by Brentford owner Matthew Benham, on loan until 31 December 2019. He contributed 12 appearances and two goals to Midtjylland's 2019–20 Danish Superliga-winning season.

Five days after his return, Marcondes' first Brentford goal was enough to beat Stoke City in an FA Cup third round match. By the time Brentford's 2019–20 season ended with defeat in the 2020 Championship play-off final, Marcondes had made 30 appearances and scored four goals.

==== 2020–21 season: Championship play-off winner ====
Marcondes began the 2020–21 season alternating between starting and substitute roles and his bicycle kick in an EFL Cup third round victory over West Bromwich Albion on 22 September 2020 was voted the EFL Cup Goal of the Round. He made 24 appearances before suffering a back injury in January 2021, which kept him out for seven weeks. Marcondes continued on in a substitute role for the remainder of the regular season, but started in two of Brentford's three playoff matches. He started in the 2021 Championship play-off final versus Swansea City and scored Brentford's second goal in the 2–0 win, which secured promotion to the Premier League. Marcondes finished the 2020–21 season with 40 appearances, three goals and departed the club when his contract expired. Marcondes made 97 appearances and scored seven goals during his 3 1/2 seasons with Brentford. Looking back on his Brentford career in June 2021, Marcondes stated "the position that I played at Brentford was not the optimal one for me. I played as an 8 and I want to play as a 10 instead. I never really got into those positions that I really wanted to be in and where I think I am best".

=== AFC Bournemouth ===
On 3 July 2021, Marcondes signed a three-year contract with Championship club AFC Bournemouth on a free transfer. He was heavily involved in the first team squad during the opening month of the season, making seven appearances and scoring one goal, before being dropped to the bench after the September international break. Marcondes returned to match play on 3 November, with a substitute cameo in a 2–1 league defeat to Preston North End.

On 11 January 2023, Marcondes rejoined former club FC Nordsjælland on loan for the remainder of the 2022–23 season. He returned to Bournemouth at the end of the season.

Marcondes moved on loan to Scottish Premiership club Hibernian in January 2024.

On 5 June 2024, Bournemouth announced he would leave the club in the summer when his contract expired.

=== Norwich City ===
In early October 2024, Marcondes signed a one-year contract with Norwich City. On 23 November, he scored his first league goal for the club in a 2–2 draw against West Bromwich Albion. On 29 April 2025, the club announced that it had exercised a one-year option to extend the player's contract. On 24 April 2026, Norwich announced that Marcondes would leave the club at the end of his contract that summer.

=== Melbourne City ===
On 20 August 2026, Marcondes signed with A-League Men club Melbourne City for the 2026–27 season.

== International career ==
Marcondes made 43 appearances and scored 10 goals for Denmark between U17 and U21 level. He was a part of the U21 squad which exited in the group stage at the 2017 UEFA European U21 Championship. Marcondes was called into the Denmark U21 squad for the Suwon Invitational Tournament, into which the team was entered in preparation for the 2016 Summer Olympics. Despite appearing in each match and scoring one goal, he was not named in the Olympic squad.

== Personal life ==
Marcondes was born in Hvidovre, Denmark, to a Danish father and a Brazilian mother and has one brother. His father is a jazz musician and his maternal grandfather is retired footballer Braz Camargo. At age 9, Marcondes' parents separated and he remained in Denmark to live with his father, while his mother returned to Brazil and died in 2012. He is affiliated with the Right to Dream Academy and was named the 2020–21 PFA Community Champion.

== Career statistics ==
As of match played on 4 January 2026

Appearances and goals by club, season and competition
| Club | Season | League | | | National cup (Note: Includes Danish Cup, FA Cup, Scottish Cup) | | League cup (Note: Includes EFL Cup, Scottish League Cup) | | Continental | | Other | | Total | |
| Club | Season | Division | Apps | Goals | Apps | Goals | Apps | Goals | Apps | Goals | Apps | Goals | Apps | Goals |
|---|---|---|---|---|---|---|---|---|---|---|---|---|---|---|
| FC Nordsjælland | 2012–13 | Danish Superliga | 3 | 0 | 0 | 0 | — | | 0 | 0 | — | | 3 | 0 |
| FC Nordsjælland | 2013–14 | Danish Superliga | 11 | 1 | 1 | 0 | — | | 3 (Note: 2 appearances in Champions League, 1 appearance in Europa League) | 0 | — | | 15 | 1 |
| FC Nordsjælland | 2014–15 | Danish Superliga | 24 | 5 | 0 | 0 | — | | — | | — | | 24 | 5 |
| FC Nordsjælland | 2015–16 | Danish Superliga | 30 | 2 | 1 | 0 | — | | — | | — | | 31 | 2 |
| FC Nordsjælland | 2016–17 | Danish Superliga | 25 | 12 | 1 | 0 | — | | — | | — | | 26 | 12 |
| FC Nordsjælland | 2017–18 | Danish Superliga | 19 | 17 | 1 | 1 | — | | — | | — | | 20 | 18 |
| FC Nordsjælland | Total | | 112 | 37 | 4 | 1 | — | | 3 | 0 | — | | 119 | 38 |
| Brentford | 2017–18 | Championship | 12 | 0 | 1 | 0 | — | | — | | — | | 13 | 0 |
| Brentford | 2018–19 | Championship | 13 | 0 | 0 | 0 | 0 | 0 | — | | — | | 13 | 0 |
| Brentford | 2019–20 | Championship | 25 | 2 | 2 | 1 | 1 | 0 | — | | 3 (Note: Appearances in Championship play-offs) | 1 | 31 | 4 |
| Brentford | 2020–21 | Championship | 31 | 1 | 0 | 0 | 6 | 1 | — | | 3 | 1 | 40 | 3 |
| Brentford | Total | | 81 | 3 | 3 | 1 | 7 | 1 | — | | 6 | 2 | 97 | 7 |
| Midtjylland (loan) | 2019–20 | Danish Superliga | 12 | 2 | 0 | 0 | — | | — | | — | | 12 | 2 |
| AFC Bournemouth | 2021–22 | EFL Championship | 17 | 2 | 2 | 3 | 2 | 0 | — | | — | | 21 | 5 |
| AFC Bournemouth | 2022–23 | Premier League | 1 | 0 | 0 | 0 | 2 | 2 | — | | — | | 3 | 2 |
| AFC Bournemouth | 2023–24 | Premier League | 0 | 0 | 0 | 0 | 0 | 0 | — | | — | | 0 | 0 |
| AFC Bournemouth | Total | | 18 | 2 | 2 | 3 | 4 | 2 | — | | — | | 24 | 7 |
| Nordsjælland (loan) | 2022–23 | Danish Superliga | 8 | 3 | 3 | 1 | — | | — | | — | | 11 | 4 |
| Hibernian (loan) | 2023–24 | Scottish Premiership | 15 | 3 | 2 | 0 | — | | — | | — | | 17 | 3 |
| Norwich City | 2024–25 | Championship | 33 | 5 | 0 | 0 | 0 | 0 | — | | — | | 33 | 5 |
| Norwich City | 2025–26 | Championship | 16 | 1 | 0 | 0 | 1 | 0 | — | | — | | 17 | 1 |
| Norwich City | Total | | 49 | 6 | 0 | 0 | 1 | 0 | — | | — | | 50 | 6 |
| Melbourne City | 2026–27 | A-League Men | 0 | 0 | 0 | 0 | — | | — | | 0 | 0 | 0 | 0 |
| Career total | | | 295 | 55 | 14 | 6 | 12 | 3 | 3 | 0 | 6 | 2 | 330 | 66 |

== Honours ==
FC Midtjylland

- Danish Superliga: 2019–20

AFC Bournemouth

- Championship runner-up: 2021–22

Brentford

- EFL Championship play-offs: 2021

Individual

- Danish Football Awards Danish Superliga Player of the Year: 2017
- Danish Superliga Player of the Month: November 2017
