= Kevin Diks =

Indonesian footballer (born 1996)

- Diks with Indonesia in 2025

Personal information
- Full name: Kevin Diks Bakarbessy
- Date of birth: 6 October 1996 (age 30)
- Place of birth: Apeldoorn, Netherlands
- Height: 1.87 m (6 ft 2 in)
- Position: Defender

Team information
- Current team: Borussia Mönchengladbach
- Number: 4

Youth career
- 2002–2004: VIOS Vaassen
- 2004–2005: AGOVV
- 2005–2014: Vitesse

Senior career*
Years	Team	Apps	(Gls)
2014–2016	Vitesse II	11	(1)
2014–2016	Vitesse	56	(2)
2016–2021	Fiorentina	2	(0)
2017	→ Vitesse (loan)	11	(0)
2017	→ Vitesse II (loan)	1	(0)
2017–2018	→ Feyenoord (loan)	23	(0)
2019	→ Empoli (loan)	0	(0)
2019–2021	→ AGF (loan)	44	(8)
2021–2025	Copenhagen	105	(12)
2025–	Borussia Mönchengladbach	38	(5)

International career^{‡}
2014–2015	Netherlands U19	4	(0)
2015	Netherlands U20	5	(0)
2016–2018	Netherlands U21	7	(0)
2024–	Indonesia	16	(3)
Medal record
Men's football
Representing Indonesia
FIFA ASEAN Cup
Winner	2026 Indonesia	Team
FIFA Series
Runner-up	2026 Indonesia
- * Club domestic league appearances and goals as of 21 November 2026 ‡ National team caps and goals as of 17:46, 5 October 2026 (UTC)

Kevin Diks Bakarbessy (born 6 October 1996) is a professional footballer who plays as a defender for Bundesliga club Borussia Mönchengladbach. Born in the Netherlands, he plays for the Indonesia national team.

== Club career ==
=== Vitesse ===
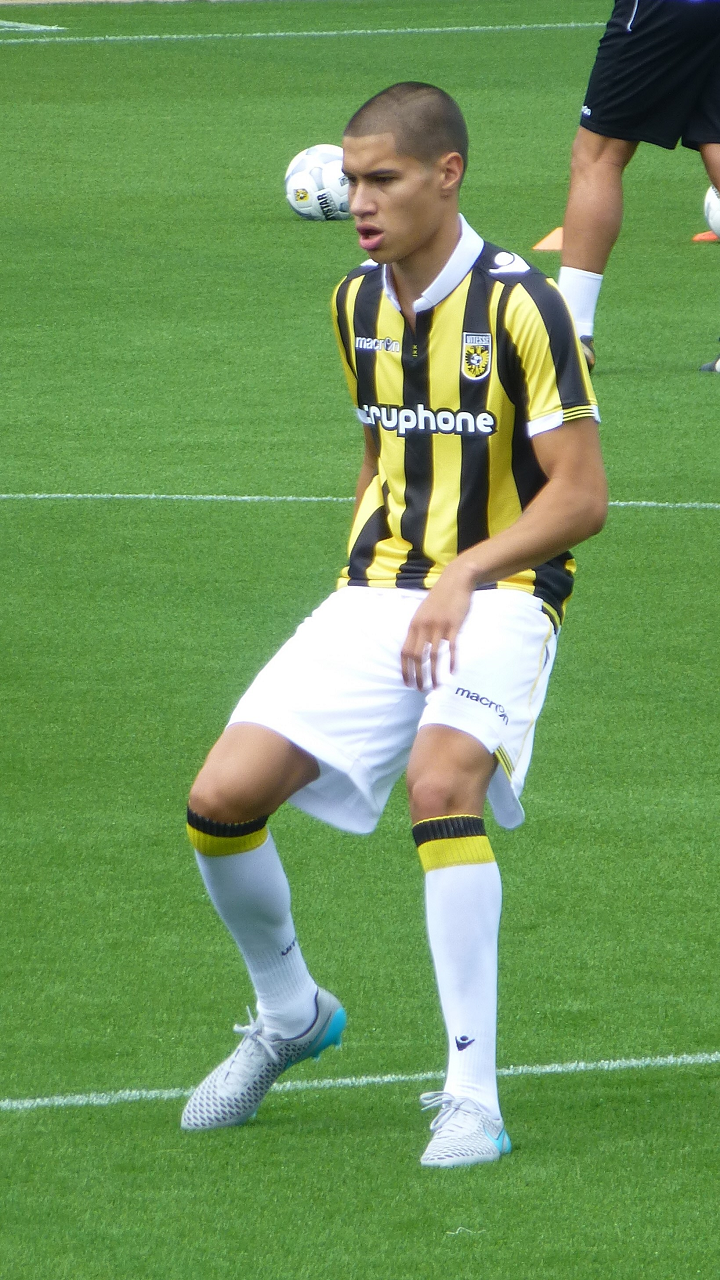
Diks playing for Vitesse in 2015

Born in Apeldoorn, Diks joined Vitesse's youth setup in 2005, aged nine, after playing for VIOS Vaassen and hometown's AGOVV Apeldoorn. In the 2014 summer he was called to the main squad for the pre-season, also appearing in a 1–3 defeat against Chelsea. On 24 August 2014, after profiting from first-choice Wallace's injury, Diks made his first-team – and Eredivisie – debut, starting in a 1–2 away loss against PEC Zwolle. On 8 January of the following year, after being already a permanent part of the main squad, he renewed his link until 2018.

=== Fiorentina ===
On 6 July 2016, Diks joined Serie A side Fiorentina on a five-year deal after impressing at Vitesse. He later requested number 34 shirt in tribute to Abdelhak Nouri, who collapsed and suffered brain damage, ending his career.

On 23 October 2016, three months after signing for the Italian side, Diks finally made his long-awaited debut in a 5–3 away victory against Cagliari, replacing Cristian Tello in the 88th minute.

==== Vitesse (loan) ====
On 31 January 2017, Diks returned to Vitesse on loan for the remainder of the 2016–17 campaign, after failing to make his breakthrough whilst in Italy. On 11 February 2017, Diks made his Vitesse return in their 2–0 home defeat against Willem II, playing the full 90 minutes. On 5 April 2017, Diks got sent off for a second bookable offence during Vitesse's 1–0 away victory against Heracles Almelo.

He came off the bench as Vitesse won the final of the KNVB Beker 2–0 against AZ Alkmaar on 30 April 2017 to help the club, three-time runners up, to the title for the first time in its 125-year history.

==== Feyenoord (loan) ====
On 4 July 2017, Diks joined Feyenoord on a season-long loan.

On 22 April 2018, he played as Feyenoord won the 2017–18 KNVB Cup final 3–0 against AZ Alkmaar.

==== Empoli (loan) ====
On 31 January 2019, Diks joined Serie A side Empoli on loan until 30 June 2019.

==== AGF (loan) ====
On transfer deadline day, 2 September 2019, Diks was loaned out to Danish Superliga club AGF for the 2019–20 season. On 31 August 2020, the loan was renewed for the 2020–21 season.

=== Copenhagen ===
On 5 July 2021, Diks returned to Denmark, signing a four-year deal with Copenhagen.

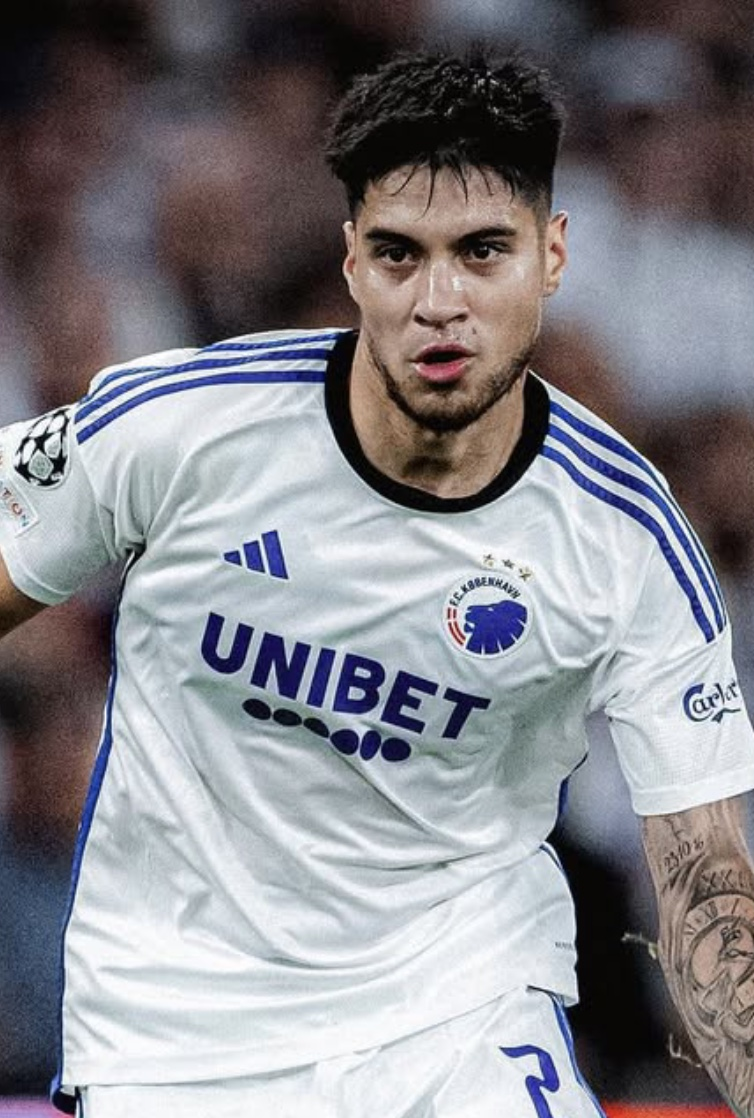
Diks playing for Copenhagen in 2023

He won the Danish championship with the club, and also reached the UEFA Europa Conference League round of 16, where they were eliminated by PSV Eindhoven. In 2023, Diks won the league and the Danish Cup with the team. Thus the club reached the group stage in the Champions League season, where they faced Borussia Dortmund, Sevilla, and Manchester City, with the latter would win the tournament.

In the following season, the club was able to reach the Champions League round of 16 after finishing second in a group with Bayern Munich, Galatasaray, and Manchester United; they earned a point at Bayern's Allianz Arena and won 4–3 at home against United. In his third year in Copenhagen, Diks was an integral part of the defense, playing as a left full-back or as a center-back. However, Copenhagen would lose the league and Danish Cup titles.

In the 2024–25 season, they regained both the league and cup trophies. Diks also played in both legs of the Conference League round of 16 against Chelsea who became the eventual champion.

=== Borussia Monchengladbach ===
On 26 January 2025, Borussia Mönchengladbach announced the signing of Diks on a five-year contract effective 1 July. On 24 August 2025, Diks made his Bundesliga debut, entering in the 77th minute as a substitute in a goalless draw against Hamburg, becoming the first Indonesian to play in the German top-flight.

== International career ==
On 9 October 2014, Diks made his Netherlands U19 debut in a 7–0 victory against Andorra U19, playing the first half before being replaced by Leeroy Owusu. Diks went on to make three more appearances before receiving a call-up to the under-20 squad. He has also represented at under-21 squad. In 2018, Diks was called up to the Netherlands senior team for a training camp, but did not play any matches for the senior team.

In October 2024, Diks confirmed that he had decided to represent Indonesia at international level. On 3 November 2024, he was called up for 2026 FIFA World Cup qualification matches against Japan and Saudi Arabia. On 15 November 2024, he debuted in a 2026 FIFA World Cup qualifier against Japan, but came off as a substitute after 41 minutes due to injury, as the latter defeated Indonesia 4–0.

On 8 October 2025, Diks scored two penalties in a 2–3 loss against Saudi Arabia in the 2026 FIFA World Cup qualifier fourth round.

== Personal life ==
Diks was born in Apeldoorn and has a brother, Jamarro, who was also a footballer. Diks is of Indonesian descent through his Moluccan mother.

On 8 November 2024, Diks officially obtained Indonesian citizenship.

== Career statistics ==
=== Club ===
As of match played 21 November 2026

Appearances and goals by club, season and competition
Club	Season	League			National cup (Note: Includes KNVB Cup, Danish Cup, DFB Pokal)		Europe		Other		Total	
Club	Season	Division	Apps	Goals	Apps	Goals	Apps	Goals	Apps	Goals	Apps	Goals
Vitesse	2014–15	Eredivisie	22	0	4	0	—		4 (Note: Appearances in Eredivisie European play-offs)	0	30	0
Vitesse	2015–16	Eredivisie	30	2	1	0	2 (Note: Appearances in UEFA Europa League)	0	—		33	2
Vitesse	Total		52	2	5	0	2	0	4	0	63	2
Fiorentina	2016–17	Serie A	2	0	0	0	0	0	—		2	0
Vitesse (loan)	2016–17	Eredivisie	11	0	1	0	—		—		12	0
Feyenoord (loan)	2017–18	Eredivisie	23	0	4	0	3 (Note: Appearances in UEFA Champions League)	0	1 (Note: Appearances in Johan Cruyff Shield)	0	31	0
Empoli (loan)	2018–19	Serie A	0	0	0	0	—		—		0	0
AGF (loan)	2019–20	Danish Superliga	19	1	2	0	—		—		21	1
AGF (loan)	2020–21	Danish Superliga	25	7	4	1	0	0	—		29	8
AGF (loan)	Total		44	8	6	1	0	0	—		50	9
Copenhagen	2021–22	Danish Superliga	26	2	1	0	12 (Note: Appearances in UEFA Europa Conference League)	4	—		36	6
Copenhagen	2022–23	Danish Superliga	24	1	6	0	8	0	—		34	1
Copenhagen	2023–24	Danish Superliga	32	4	3	0	14	0	—		49	4
Copenhagen	2024–25	Danish Superliga	24	5	5	0	15	6	—		44	11
Copenhagen	Total		106	12	15	0	49	10	—		168	22
Borussia Mönchengladbach	2025–26	Bundesliga	30	5	3	0	—		—		33	5
Borussia Mönchengladbach	2026–27	Bundesliga	8	0	1	0	—		—		9	0
Borussia Mönchengladbach	Total		38	5	4	0	0	0	—		42	5
Career total			276	27	35	1	54	10	5	0	370	38

=== International ===
As of match played 5 October 2026

Appearances and goals by national team and year
National team	Year	Apps	Goals
Indonesia	2024	1	0
Indonesia	2025	7	2
Indonesia	2026	8	1
Total		16	3

As of match played 1 October 2026
Scores and results list Indonesia's goal tally first, score column indicates score after each Diks goal.

Table key
‡	Indicates goal was scored from a penalty kick

List of international goals scored by Kevin Diks
No.	Date	Venue	Cap	Opponent	Score	Result	Competition
1	8 October 2025	King Abdullah Sports City Stadium, Jeddah, Saudi Arabia	7	Saudi Arabia	1–0‡	2–3	2026 FIFA World Cup qualification
2	8 October 2025	King Abdullah Sports City Stadium, Jeddah, Saudi Arabia	7	Saudi Arabia	2–3‡	2–3	2026 FIFA World Cup qualification
3	1 October 2026	Gelora Bung Karno Stadium, Jakarta, Indonesia	15	Bangladesh	8–2	9–2	2026 FIFA ASEAN Cup

== Honours ==
Vitesse

- KNVB Cup: 2016–17

Feyenoord

- KNVB Cup: 2017–18
- Johan Cruijff Shield: 2017

Copenhagen

- Danish Superliga: 2021–22, 2022–23, 2024–25
- Danish Cup: 2022–23, 2024–25

Indonesia

- FIFA ASEAN Cup: 2026
- FIFA Series runner-up: 2026

Individual

- Danish Superliga Team of the Season: 2023–24

== See also ==
- List of Indonesia international footballers born outside Indonesia
