= Magnus Anbo =

Danish footballer (born 2000)

Personal information
- Full name: Magnus Anbo Clausen
- Date of birth: 18 September 2000 (age 26)
- Place of birth: Risskov, Denmark
- Height: 1.85 m (6 ft 1 in)
- Position: Right-back

Youth career
- VRI
- 2015–2019: AGF

Senior career*
Years	Team	Apps	(Gls)
2019–2021	AGF	7	(0)
2021	→ Stjarnan (loan)	16	(3)
- * Club domestic league appearances and goals as of 15:37, 17 October 2021 (UTC)

Magnus Anbo Clausen (born 18 September 2000) is a Danish retired footballer who played as a right back.

== Club career ==
=== AGF ===
Anbo joined AGF from local Risskov club Vejlby-Risskov Idrætsklub (VRI) in 2015.

Anbo was with the first team squad on training camp in the pre-season 2018/19 at the age of 17. Eight days after he turned 18, he got his official debut for AGF against Aarhus Fremad in the Danish Cup on 26 September 2018. In January 2019 he then signed a contract extension and only one month later, AGF decided to offer him a new contract again after the club had sold Dino Mikanović, this time a professional contract until the summer 2021 and he was permanently promoted to the first team squad to replace Mikanović.

On 15 April 2019, Anbo played his first game in the Danish Superliga against SønderjyskE.

On 9 April 2021, Anbo signed a contract extension until the summer 2022 and was loaned out to Icelandic club Stjarnan until 30 August 2021. The loan deal was later extended with one month, until the end of the Icelandic league.

On 21 October 2021 AGF confirmed, that 21-year old Anbo had decided to retire from football and therefore would leave the club with immediate effect.

== Career statistics ==
As of match played 20 October 2019

Club	Season	League			Danish Cup		Total	
Club	Season	Division	Apps	Goals	Apps	Goals	Apps	Goals
AGF	2018–19	Danish Superliga	3	0	1	0	4	0
AGF	2019–20	Danish Superliga	1	0	1	0	2	0
AGF	Total		4	0	2	0	6	0
Career total			4	0	2	0	6	0
