= Mikael Anderson =

Icelandic-Danish footballer (born 1998)

Personal information
- Full name: Mikael Neville Anderson
- Date of birth: 1 July 1998 (age 28)
- Place of birth: Sandgerði, Iceland
- Height: 1.80 m (5 ft 11 in)
- Position: Winger

Team information
- Current team: AGF

Youth career
- Reynir Sandgerði
- Harlev IK
- AGF
- Midtjylland

Senior career*
Years	Team	Apps	(Gls)
2016–2021	Midtjylland	63	(5)
2017–2018	→ Vendsyssel (loan)	18	(5)
2018–2019	→ Excelsior (loan)	17	(1)
2021–2025	AGF	106	(17)
2025–2026	Djurgårdens IF	18	(6)
2026–	AGF	0	(0)

International career^{‡}
2014	Iceland U16	3	(0)
2016	Denmark U18	1	(0)
2017	Denmark U19	1	(0)
2017–2021	Iceland U21	16	(0)
2018–	Iceland	42	(2)
- * Club domestic league appearances and goals as of 3 July 2026 ‡ National team caps and goals as of 6 October 2026

Mikael Neville Anderson (born 1 July 1998) is an Icelandic professional footballer who plays as a winger in AGF and the Iceland national team.

== Club career ==
=== Midtjylland ===
Mikael is a product of AGF and Reynir Sandgerdi where he played before joining FC Midtjylland as U14 player. At the age of 14, he was invited to a trial at Aston Villa.

After a successful 2015–16 with the U19 squad, eight U19 players including Mikael was promoted to the first team squad. All of them was offered a full time professional contract. FCM offered him a five-year contract in August 2016, but Mikael did not want to sign it. Mikael revealed, that he did not wanted to tell what the problem was, but if the club couldn't accommodate his requirements. However, he signed the contract in October 2016. In November 2016, he went back from a six-month injury in his knee.

He made his professional debut in the Danish Superliga for Midtjylland on 1 December 2016 in a game against Silkeborg IF.

==== On loan to Vendsyssel FF ====
On 31 August 2017, Mikael was loaned out to Vendsyssel FF in the Danish 1st Division for the rest of the season. He scored the winning goal in a 2–1 victory against Lyngby BK and secured a promotion to the Superliga for the first time in the club's history.

==== On loan to Excelsior ====
On 2 July 2018, Mikael was loaned out to Excelsior in the Eredivisie for the rest of the season.

==== Return to FC Midtjylland ====
Mikael returned to FC Midtjylland for the 2019–20 season and was called up for the first game of the Danish Superliga season against Esbjerg. Mikael started on the bench and came on the pitch in the 85th minute. He scored the match winning goal in the last minute which gave Midtjylland a 1–0 victory.

=== AGF ===
On 1 September 2021, AGF confirmed, that Mikael had returned to the club on a deal until June 2026.

== International career ==
Mikael has represented both Iceland and Denmark internationally at youth levels. In late 2017 he decided to represent Iceland internationally. On 15 December 2017 he was called up to the senior Iceland squad for two friendlies against Indonesia in January 2018. On 4 June 2021, Mikael scored his first goal for Iceland in a 1–0 win against Faroe Islands.

== Personal life ==
Mikael has an Icelandic mother and a Jamaican father. He also has Danish citizenship having been partially raised in the country.

== Career statistics ==
=== Club ===
As of match played on 15 December 2024

Appearances and goals by club, season and competition
Club	Season	League			National cup		Other		Total	
Club	Season	Division	Apps	Goals	Apps	Goals	Apps	Goals	Apps	Goals
Midtjylland	2016–17	Danish Superliga	2	0	1	0	—		3	0
Midtjylland	2019–20	Danish Superliga	31	4	0	0	2 (Note: Appearances in the UEFA Europa League)	0	33	4
Midtjylland	2020–21	Danish Superliga	26	1	5	0	8 (Note: Appearances in the UEFA Champions League)	0	39	1
Midtjylland	2021–22	Danish Superliga	4	0	0	0	1	0	5	0
Midtjylland	Total		63	5	6	0	11	0	80	5
Vendsyssel FF (loan)	2017–18	Danish 1st Division	18	5	1	0	2 (Note: Appearances in the 2017–18 Danish Superliga Relegation play-offs)	2	21	7
Excelsior (loan)	2018–19	Eredivisie	17	1	0	0	1 (Note: Appearances in the 2018–19 Eredivisie Promotion/Relegation play-offs)	0	18	1
AGF	2021–22	Danish Superliga	20	5	1	0	—		21	5
AGF	2022–23	Danish Superliga	26	5	1	0	—		27	5
AGF	2023–24	Danish Superliga	30	1	7	1	2 (Note: Appearances in the UEFA Europa Conference League)	0	39	2
AGF	2024–25	Danish Superliga	17	2	4	0	—		21	2
AGF	Total		93	13	13	1	2	0	108	14
Career total			191	24	20	1	16	2	227	27

=== International ===
Scores and results list Iceland's goal tally first, score column indicates score after each Anderson goal.

List of international goals scored by Mikael Anderson
No.	Date	Venue	Opponent	Score	Result	Competition	Ref.
1	4 June 2021	Tórsvøllur, Tórshavn, Faroe Islands	Faroe Islands	1–0	1–0	Friendly	
2	27 September 2022	Air Albania Stadium, Tirana, Albania	Albania	1–1	1–1	2022-23 UEFA Nations League	
