= Marcus Gudmann =

Danish footballer (born 2000)

Personal information
- Full name: Marcus Mustac Gudmann
- Date of birth: 27 February 2000 (age 26)
- Place of birth: Ledøje-Smørum, Denmark
- Height: 1.83 m (6 ft 0 in)
- Position: Centre-back

Team information
- Current team: Helsingborgs IF
- Number: 4

Youth career
- 2006–2011: Ledøje-Smørum
- 2011–2018: Nordsjælland

Senior career*
Years	Team	Apps	(Gls)
2018–2020	Nordsjælland	1	(0)
2020	→ Roskilde (loan)	15	(0)
2020–2021	Kolding	15	(0)
2021–2022	Esbjerg	7	(1)
2022–2023	AB	29	(8)
2023–2025	HB Køge	37	(5)
2025–	Helsingborgs IF	23	(2)

International career
2017	Denmark U18	4	(0)
2017–2019	Denmark U19	10	(0)
- * Club domestic league appearances and goals as of 12 November 2026

Marcus Mustac Gudmann (born 27 February 2000) is a Danish footballer who plays as a centre-back for Swedish Superettan club Helsingborgs IF.

== Club career ==
=== FC Nordsjælland ===
Gudmann came to FC Nordsjælland at the age of 11 from Ledøje-Smørum, where he had played since he was 6 years old. In January 2017, Gudmann signed a 2,5-year youth contract with Nordsjælland.

Gudmann's first senior experience was on 3 January 2018, where he sat on the bench for the whole game against Silkeborg IF. He got his debut for FC Nordsjælland on 11 November 2018. Gudmann started on the bench, but replaced Ulrik Yttergård Jenssen in the 60th minute in a 1–1 draw against Randers FC in the Danish Superliga.

On 9 January 2019, Gudmann signed his first professional contract and would become a permanent part of the first team from the summer 2019.

On the transfer deadline day, 31 January 2020, Gudmann was loaned out to Danish 1st Division club FC Roskilde for the rest of the season.

=== Kolding IF ===
On 2 October 2020, Gudmann joined Danish 1st Division club Kolding IF, signing a one-year contract. After a total of 17 appearances throughout the 2020–21 season, Kolding confirmed on 27 May 2021, that Gudmann was one of seven players that would leave the club.

=== Esbjerg ===
On 30 June 2021, Gudmann moved to Esbjerg fB on a deal until June 2023. After a first season, which ended with a relegation to the Danish 2nd Division, the club confirmed on 5 August 2022, that Gudmann's contract had been terminated by mutual agreement.

=== AB ===
After leaving Esbjerg, Gudmann joined Danish 2nd Division club AB in August 2022.

=== HB Køge ===
On 8 July 2023, Gudmann moved to Danish 1st Division club HB Køge. However, the club did not disclose the length of the contract. Gudmann made his debut for Køge on 21 July 2023 against Hillerød. In his second game for Køge, against Vendsyssel FF on 28 July 2023, Gudmann scored two goals, helping Køge securing a 3–1 victory.

=== Helsingborgs IF ===
On January 31, 2025, it was confirmed that Gudmann joined Swedish Superettan club Helsingborgs IF on a deal until June 2028.
