= Gift Links =

South African soccer player (born 1988)

Personal information
- Full name: Neo Gift Links
- Date of birth: 2 October 1998 (age 28)
- Place of birth: Vryburg, South Africa
- Height: 1.70 m (5 ft 7 in)
- Positions: Winger; forward; wingback

Team information
- Current team: AGF
- Number: 11

Youth career
- Platinum Stars

Senior career*
Years	Team	Apps	(Gls)
2017–2018	Platinum Stars	6	(0)
2018	Al Assiouty Sport	13	(0)
2018–2019	Cape Town City	37	(5)
2019–	AGF	163	(9)

International career
2018–2021	South Africa	5	(0)
- * Club domestic league appearances and goals as of 10 December 2025

Neo Gift Links (born 2 October 1998) is a South African professional soccer player who plays as a left wingback for Danish Superliga club AGF.

== Career ==
Links was part of the Cape Town City team which won the MTN 8 Cup in 2018. On 1 September 2019, Links joined Danish Superliga club AGF on a contract until June 2024. He made his debut for the club on 15 September in a 3–0 home win over AaB, coming on as an 82nd-minute substitute for Jakob Ankersen.

Originally a forward, the arrival of head coach Uwe Rösler in the 2022–23 season saw Links shifted to the wingback position. During the season, Links adapted extremely well, delivering a Man of the Match performance in the final game of the season, in which AGF came back from 0–3 at home against Brøndby IF to draw 3–3 to secure third place in the Superliga.

In June 2025, he extended his contract with AGF until 2029. In 2026, he won the Danish Championship with the club, their first in 40 years. He was one of AGF's best players during that season, and was nominated for the Superliga player of the year award. The following summer he extended his contract with AGF until 2031, despite interest from the French club RC Lens.

== Career statistics ==
=== Club ===
As of match played 10 December 2023

Appearances and goals by club, season and competition
Club	Season	League			National cup (Note: Includes Nedbank Cup, Danish Cup)		League cup (Note: Includes Telkom Knockout)		Continental		Other		Total	
Club	Season	Division	Apps	Goals	Apps	Goals	Apps	Goals	Apps	Goals	Apps	Goals	Apps	Goals
Platinum Stars	2016–17	South African Premier Division	5	0	1	0	1	0	—		0	0	7	0
Platinum Stars	2017–18	South African Premier Division	1	0	0	0	0	0	5 (Note: Appearances in CAF Confederation Cup)	0	0	0	6	0
Platinum Stars	Total		6	0	1	0	1	0	5	0	0	0	13	0
Al Assiouty Sport	2017–18	Egyptian Premier League	12	0	0	0	—		0	0	0	0	12	0
Cape Town City	2018–19	South African Premier Division	26	5	2	0	1	0	—		4 (Note: Appearances in MTN 8)	0	33	5
AGF	2019–20	Danish Superliga	15	0	2	0	—		—		—		17	0
AGF	2020–21	Danish Superliga	29	4	4	1	—		2 (Note: Appearances in UEFA Europa League)	0	—		35	5
AGF	2021–22	Danish Superliga	21	1	1	0	—		1 (Note: Appearance in UEFA Europa Conference League)	0	—		23	1
AGF	2022–23	Danish Superliga	31	3	3	0	—		—		—		34	4
AGF	2023–24	Danish Superliga	16	4	4	0	—		1	0	—		21	3
AGF	Total		113	5	14	1	—		4	0	—		130	13
Career total			156	10	17	1	2	0	9	0	4	0	188	18

=== International ===
Appearances and goals by national team and year
National team	Year	Apps	Goals
South Africa	2018	2	0
South Africa	2019	2	0
South Africa	2021	1	0
Total		5	0

== Honours ==
Cape Town City

- MTN 8: 2018

AGF

- Danish Superliga: 2025–26

Individual

- Danish Superliga Team of the Year: 2025–26
