= Casper Højer =

Danish footballer (born 1994)

Personal information
- Full name: Casper Højer Nielsen
- Date of birth: 20 November 1994 (age 31)
- Place of birth: Copenhagen, Denmark
- Height: 1.83 m (6 ft 0 in)
- Position: Left-back

Youth career
- 2002–2006: Skjold
- 2006–2012: KB

Senior career*
Years	Team	Apps	(Gls)
2012–2014	Copenhagen	0	(0)
2013–2014	→ Brønshøj (loan)	25	(0)
2014–2018	Lyngby	50	(2)
2018–2021	AGF	111	(11)
2021–2023	Sparta Prague	32	(2)
2023–2026	Çaykur Rizespor	86	(2)

International career
2011–2012	Denmark U18	9	(3)
2012–2013	Denmark U19	6	(1)
- * Club domestic league appearances and goals as of 10 June 2026

Casper Højer Nielsen (born 20 November 1994) is a Danish professional footballer who plays as a left-back.

A product of FC Copenhagen's youth academy, Højer failed to break through and mainly played at the lower levels for Brønshøj and Lyngby early on. He moved to AGF in 2018, where he excelled and earned a move to Czech club Sparta Prague in 2021. After two seasons, he joined newly promoted Süper Lig club Çaykur Rizespor.

Højer has been capped 15 times for the Denmark national under-18 and under-19 teams, respectively.

== Club career ==
=== Early years ===
Højer Nielsen, whose father Lars had played professional football himself for B 1903 and their successor club FC Copenhagen, among others, was trained in the academy of FC Copenhagen. In July 2013, he sent on loan within the city to the second-tier Danish 1st Division club Brønshøj Boldklub from the Brønshøj district to player under head coach Bo Henriksen. On 28 July 2013, he played his first senior game in the 4–1 defeat away against Silkeborg IF. At Brønshøj, he was utilised regularly and after a year he moved to Brønshøj's second division competitor Lyngby Boldklub from Lyngby-Taarbæk Municipality in the urban area of Copenhagen. Whereas he would play most games during his first season, Højer Nielsen only appeared in nine games in his second year at Lyngby. Nevertheless, he promoted with the club in the Danish Superliga.

=== AGF ===
Having not played a lot in his first season in the Superliga with Lyngby either, and the situation would not improve in his second year where Lyngby had qualified for the UEFA Europa League, he signed with AGF in the winter transfer window of the 2017–18 season. Originally, he was supposed to move to the Aarhus-based club on a three-year deal in the summer of 2018, but the clubs eventually reached an agreement to send him to his new club in February 2018. There, Højer Nielsen fought for a regular place and helped secure the club's survival in the Superliga relegation round. On 16 September 2018, he scored his first goal for the club in the 2–3 away win over AC Horsens to win the game. In the following season, 2019–20, Højer Nielsen was a regular starter at the left-back position.

=== Sparta Prague ===
On 9 May 2021, it was announced that Højer Nielsen had signed with Czech First League club Sparta Prague for an undisclosed fee, reported to be €700,000. His contract with AGF had been set to expire in December 2021.

=== Çaykur Rizespor ===
On 10 September 2023, Højer Nielsen signed a three-year contract with Turkish club Çaykur Rizespor.

== International career ==
Højer Nielsen played nine games for the national under-18 team from 2011 to 2012, in which he scored three goals. He would then play at the side of, among others, Yussuf Poulsen for the under-19 team a year later, where he gained six caps and scored one goal.

== Personal life ==
He is the son of former professional football player Lars Højer Nielsen.

== Career statistics ==
As of match played 21 April 2024

Appearances and goals by club, season and competition
Club	Season	League			Cup		Continental		Other		Total	
Club	Season	Division	Apps	Goals	Apps	Goals	Apps	Goals	Apps	Goals	Apps	Goals
Copenhagen	2012–13	Danish Superliga	0	0	0	0	0	0	—		0	0
Brønshøj (loan)	2013–14	Danish 1st Division	25	0	2	0	—		—		27	0
Lyngby	2014–15	Danish 1st Division	24	0	1	0	—		—		25	0
Lyngby	2015–16	Danish 1st Division	9	1	4	1	—		—		13	2
Lyngby	2016–17	Danish Superliga	9	0	2	0	—		—		11	0
Lyngby	2017–18	Danish Superliga	8	1	1	0	1	0	—		10	1
Lyngby	Total		50	2	8	1	1	0	—		59	3
AGF	2017–18	Danish Superliga	16	0	—		—		—		16	0
AGF	2018–19	Danish Superliga	31	4	2	0	—		—		33	4
AGF	2019–20	Danish Superliga	35	4	2	0	—		—		37	4
AGF	2020–21	Danish Superliga	28	3	4	0	2	0	—		34	3
AGF	Total		111	11	8	0	2	0	—		121	11
Sparta Prague	2021–22	Czech First League	11	0	2	0	2	0	—		15	0
Sparta Prague	2022–23	Czech First League	21	2	2	0	0	0	—		23	2
Sparta Prague	Total		32	2	4	0	2	0	—		38	2
Çaykur Rizespor	2023–24	Süper Lig	27	1	0	0	—		—		27	1
Career total			245	16	22	1	5	0	0	0	272	17

== Honours ==
Sparta Prague

- Czech First League: 2022–23
