= Jesper Juelsgård =

Danish footballer (born 1989)

Personal information
- Full name: Jesper Lindorff Juelsgård
- Date of birth: 26 January 1989 (age 37)
- Place of birth: Spjald, Denmark
- Height: 1.82 m (6 ft 0 in)
- Position: Centre-back

Team information
- Current team: Horsens FS (player-manager)

Youth career
- Spjald IF
- Midtjylland

Senior career*
Years	Team	Apps	(Gls)
2007–2014	Midtjylland	144	(2)
2008	→ Skive (loan)	0	(0)
2014–2015	Evian	13	(0)
2014–2015	Evian B	5	(0)
2015–2016	Brøndby	19	(0)
2016–2022	AGF	117	(3)
2022	Valur	24	(2)
2023–2025	Fredericia	52	(1)
2025–	Horsens FS		

International career
2005	Denmark U16	1	(0)
2006	Denmark U17	1	(0)
2006–2007	Denmark U18	4	(0)
2007–2008	Denmark U19	8	(1)
2009–2011	Denmark U21	10	(0)
2012–2014	Denmark	2	(0)

Managerial career
- 2025–: Horsens FS (player-manager)
- * Club domestic league appearances and goals as of 29 May 2025

Jesper Lindorff Juelsgård (born 26 January 1989) is a Danish professional footballer who plays as a centre-back. He is currently working as a player-manager for the Denmark Series club Horsens FS.

== Club career ==
Juelsgård is a product of Midtjylland's football academy, which he joined from the childhood club Spjald IF. He was sent on a six-month loan to Skive IK in 2008 alongside fellow talent Christian Sivebæk. Upon his return to Midtjylland, he made his debut against AGF on 2 November 2008 as a starter, before being substituted in the 77th minute for Kim Christensen as his club lost 2–1. He managed to become a starter for the following years and he made a total of 144 league appearances for the club. He also won Player of the Year at the club for 2011.

On 7 July 2014, Juelsgård signed a three-year contract with French Ligue 1 club Évian.

He managed to stay with the French club for just over a year before signing a four-year agreement with Brøndby IF on 28 August 2015. After a promising start at Brøndby, Juelsgård gradually slipped out of the starting line-up on the team, and he then moved to AGF, just before the summer transfer window closed in 2016. He signed a three-year contract extension in June 2019.

On 22 February 2022, Juelsgård was sold to Icelandic club Valur. His contract was terminated in October 2022. On 12 January 2023, Juelsgård signed for Danish 1st Division side FC Fredericia on a deal until June 2024.

On 22 May 2025, Juelsgård announced that he would retire after the season. Despite having announced his retirement, it was confirmed on 11 June 2025 that Juelsgård had been appointed player-manager of the Denmark Series club Horsens FS.

== International career ==
Juelsgård made his debut for the Denmark national team on 15 August 2012 against Slovakia, where Denmark lost 1–3.

== Honours ==
=== Club ===
Midtjylland

- Danish Superliga runner-up: 2007–08
- Danish Cup runner-up: 2009–10, 2010–11

AGF

- The Atlantic Cup: 2018, 2020

=== Individual ===
- Midtjylland Player of the Year: 2011
