= William Eskelinen =

Swedish footballer (born 1996)

Personal information
- Date of birth: 3 September 1996 (age 30)
- Height: 1.91 m (6 ft 3 in)
- Position: Goalkeeper

Team information
- Current team: Nordic United
- Number: 30

Youth career
- 2001–2008: Skogås-Trångsund
- 2008–2013: Brommapojkarna

Senior career*
Years	Team	Apps	(Gls)
2013	Brommapojkarna	0	(0)
2014	Värmdö	11	(0)
2015–2016	Hammarby	0	(0)
2015	→ Värmdö (loan)	20	(0)
2016	→ Aspudden-Tellus (loan)	11	(0)
2016	→ Enskede (loan)	12	(0)
2017–2019	GIF Sundsvall	48	(0)
2019–2022	AGF	33	(0)
2022–2023	Örebro	56	(0)
2024	Vestri	26	(0)
2025	AC Oulu	17	(0)
2026–	Nordic United	14	(0)

International career
2011	Sweden U17	1	(0)
2013	Sweden U19	1	(0)
- * Club domestic league appearances and goals as of 21 July 2026

William Eskelinen (born 3 September 1996) is a Swedish professional footballer who plays for Nordic United as a goalkeeper.

== Career ==
Eskelinen started playing football for Skogås-Trångsunds FF at the age of five. As a 12-year-old he moved to the IF Brommapojkarna academy. Eskelinen started playing senior football at Division 2 club Värmdö IF in 2014.

In March 2015, Eskelinen was signed by Hammarby IF on a one-year contract and was immediately loaned back to Värmdö IF. In January 2016, Eskelinen extended his contract in Hammarby by one year. In March 2016, he was loaned out to the Division 2 club IFK Aspudden-Tellus on a loan agreement until the summer. In August 2016, Eskelinen was loaned out to the Ettan club Enskede IK.

In January 2017, Eskelinen was signed by GIF Sundsvall on a three-year contract. On 18 September 2017, Eskelinen made his Allsvenskan debut in a 2–1 win over AFC Eskilstuna, where he was substituted in the 35th minute for the injured Tommy Naurin.

In July 2019, Eskelinen signed a five-year contract with Danish Superliga club AGF. In March 2022, he returned to Sweden, signing a deal until the end of 2023 with Örebro SK.

On 4 March 2024, Eskelinen signed with Vestri in Iceland.

On 14 January 2025, Eskelinen signed with Veikkausliiga club AC Oulu on a one-year deal with a one-year option. On 12 August, the club announced that Eskelinen would miss the remainder of the season due to injury which occurred in a match against Inter Turku four days earlier.

== Personal life ==
Eskelinen's father is the former professional footballer Kaj Eskelinen, who was a striker. William is of Finnish descent through his father.

== Career statistics ==
As of 21 July 2026

Appearances and goals by club, season and competition
Club	Season	League			Cup (Note: Includes Svenska Cupen, Danish Cup and Suomen Cup)		League cup (Note: Includes Icelandic League Cup and Finnish League Cup)		Europe		Total	
Club	Season	Division	Apps	Goals	Apps	Goals	Apps	Goals	Apps	Goals	Apps	Goals
Brommapojkarna	2013	Allsvenskan	0	0	0	0	–		–		0	0
Värmdö	2014	Swedish Division 2	11	0	2	0	–		–		13	0
Hammarby	2015	Allsvenskan	0	0	0	0	–		0	0	0	0
Hammarby	2016	Allsvenskan	0	0	0	0	–		0	0	0	0
Värmdö (loan)	2015	Swedish Division 2	20	0	–		–		–		20	0
Aspudden-Tellus (loan)	2016	Swedish Division 2	11	0	–		–		–		11	0
Enskede (loan)	2016	Swedish Division 1	12	0	–		–		–		12	0
GIF Sundsvall	2017	Allsvenskan	3	0	4	0	–		–		7	0
GIF Sundsvall	2018	Allsvenskan	30	0	1	0	–		–		31	0
GIF Sundsvall	2019	Allsvenskan	15	0	0	0	–		–		15	0
GIF Sundsvall	Total		48	0	5	0	0	0	0	0	53	0
AGF	2019–20	Danish Superliga	29	0	4	0	–		–		33	0
AGF	2020–21	Danish Superliga	4	0	0	0	–		2 (Note: Appearances in UEFA Europa League)	0	6	0
AGF	2021–22	Danish Superliga	0	0	0	0	–		–		0	0
AGF	Total		33	0	4	0	0	0	2	0	39	0
Örebro	2022	Superettan	27	0	4	0	–		–		31	0
Örebro	2023	Superettan	29	0	1	0	–		–		30	0
Örebro	Total		56	0	5	0	0	0	0	0	61	0
Vestri	2024	Besta deild karla	26	0	0	0	1	0	–		27	0
AC Oulu	2025	Veikkausliiga	17	0	4	0	4	0	–		25	0
Nordic United	2026	Superettan	14	0	0	0	–		–		14	0
Career total			249	0	20	0	5	0	2	0	276	0
