= Bror Blume =

Danish footballer (born 1992)

Personal information
- Full name: Bror Emil Blume-Jensen
- Date of birth: 22 January 1992 (age 34)
- Place of birth: Copenhagen, Denmark
- Height: 1.77 m (5 ft 10 in)
- Position: Midfielder

Team information
- Current team: Helsingør
- Number: 5

Youth career
- 1995–2007: Skjold
- 2007: Hvidovre
- 2007–2011: Lyngby

Senior career*
Years	Team	Apps	(Gls)
2011–2018	Lyngby	121	(11)
2018–2021	AGF	95	(12)
2021–2025	WSG Tirol	91	(5)
2025–2026	Lyngby	25	(3)
2026–	Helsingør	3	(0)

International career
2011–2012	Denmark U20	4	(1)
- * Club domestic league appearances and goals as of 4 October 2026

Bror Emil Blume-Jensen (born 22 January 1992) is a Danish professional footballer who plays as a midfielder for Danish 3rd Division club Helsingør.

== Club career ==
=== Lyngby Boldklub ===
Blume joined Lyngby in 2010 where he played two years on the U19 squad. He signed his first contract with Lyngby in July 2010, but would continue for a while on the U19- and reserve squad. He was promoted to the first team squad in the following summer, and signed a contract extension until 2012. He got his debut for Lyngby in a Danish Cup game, which Lyngby lost after penalty shootout. Blume replaced Bajram Fetai in the 60th minute and missed his penalty in the shootout.

Blume got his Danish Superliga debut against F.C. Copenhagen on 10 September 2011. Blume only got two league games in this season, and three games in the following season. However, he signed a new contract in the summer 2012, that would keep him in the club until the following summer. Blume got his breakthrough in the 2013/14 season. He quickly became a regular part of the squad in this season, and extended his contract two times in 2014 and once again in 2017 after a great season. His coach, David Nielsen, said after the 2016/17 season, that "Bror Blume has gone from being a player I couldn't use to being a player that is an important part of our team."

Blume can play on all offensive positions. In the 2016/17 season, he was used on several positions: Left or right midfielder, central midfielder and attacking midfielder.

Due to the economic situation of Lyngby in 2018, he terminated his contract on 7 February 2018, because he hadn't received his salary.

=== AGF ===
Blume signed for AGF on 1 March 2018.

=== WSG Tirol ===
After three years in AGF, Blume moved to Austrian club WSG Tirol in the summer 2021.

=== Return to Lyngby ===
In late June 2025, Blume trained with his former club, Lyngby Boldklub, which had just been relegated to the Danish 1st Division. On 17 July, Lyngby confirmed that they had signed a one-year contract with Blume.

=== Helsingør ===
On 2 September 2026, Blume joined Danish 3rd Division side FC Helsingør.

== Honours ==
Lyngby

- Danish 1st Division: 2025–26
