= Jón Dagur Þorsteinsson =

Icelandic footballer (born 1998)

Personal information
- Date of birth: 26 November 1998 (age 27)
- Place of birth: Kópavogur, Iceland
- Height: 1.75 m (5 ft 9 in)
- Position: Winger

Team information
- Current team: Hertha BSC
- Number: 24

Youth career
- –2015: HK Kópavogur
- 2015–2018: Fulham

Senior career*
Years	Team	Apps	(Gls)
2014–2015	HK Kópavogur	8	(0)
2018–2019	Fulham	0	(0)
2018–2019	→ Vendsyssel (loan)	24	(3)
2019–2022	AGF	86	(18)
2022–2024	OH Leuven	71	(20)
2024–	Hertha BSC	40	(3)
2026	→ Brann (loan)	12	(2)

International career^{‡}
2014–2015	Iceland U17	12	(0)
2015–2016	Iceland U19	8	(0)
2017–2021	Iceland U21	21	(5)
2018–	Iceland	58	(6)
- * Club domestic league appearances and goals as of 29 May 2026 ‡ National team caps and goals as of 16 November 2026

Jón Dagur Þorsteinsson (born 26 November 1998) is an Icelandic professional footballer who plays as a winger for German 2. Bundesliga club Hertha BSC and the Iceland national team. He is the son of Þorsteinn Halldórsson.

== Club career ==
On 25 June 2019, Danish Superliga club AGF announced that they had signed Jón on a three-year contract. Jón left AGF at the end of the 2021–22 season.

On 27 August 2024, Jón signed a three-season contract with Hertha BSC in Germany.

On 2 February 2026, Jón was loaned by Norwegian club Brann until 30 June 2026.

== International career ==
In October 2018, Jón was named in the Iceland national team's squad for matches against France and Switzerland. On 7 June 2024, he scored the only goal of an upset 1–0 friendly victory over England at Wembley Stadium.

== Career statistics ==
=== Club ===
As of match played 29 May 2026

Appearances and goals by club, season and competition
Club	Season	League			National cup		League Cup		Europe		Other		Total	
Club	Season	Division	Apps	Goals	Apps	Goals	Apps	Goals	Apps	Goals	Apps	Goals	Apps	Goals
HK Kopavogur	2014	1. deild karla	3	0	—		—		—		—		3	0
HK Kopavogur	2015	1. deild karla	5	0	—		5	0	—		—		10	0
HK Kopavogur	Total		8	0	—		5	0	—		—		13	0
Fulham U23	2017–18	—			—		—		—		3 (Note: Appearances in EFL Trophy)	1	3	1
Fulham	2018–19	Premier League	0	0	0	0	0	0	—		—		0	0
Vendsyssel (loan)	2018–19	Danish Superliga	27	3	3	0	—		—		—		30	3
AGF	2019–20	Danish Superliga	31	8	3	0	—		—		—		34	8
AGF	2020–21	Danish Superliga	32	7	5	1	—		2 (Note: Appearances in UEFA Europa League)	0	—		39	8
AGF	2021–22	Danish Superliga	23	3	2	1	—		2 (Note: Appearances in UEFA Conference League)	0	—		27	4
AGF	Total		86	18	10	2	—		4	0	—		100	20
OH Leuven	2022–23	Belgian Pro League	31	12	2	0	—		—		—		33	12
OH Leuven	2023–24	Belgian Pro League	37	7	3	0	—		—		—		40	7
OH Leuven	2024–25	Belgian Pro League	3	1	0	0	—		—		—		3	1
OH Leuven	Total		71	20	5	0	—		—		—		76	20
Hertha BSC	2024–25	2. Bundesliga	18	0	2	0	—		—		—		20	0
Hertha BSC	2025–26	2. Bundesliga	10	0	3	1	—		—		—		13	1
Hertha BSC	2026-27	2. Bundesliga	12	3	2	0	—		—		—		14	3
Hertha BSC	Total		40	3	7	1	—		—		—		47	4
Brann	2026	Eliteserien	12	2	4	1	—		2	0	—		18	3
Career total			244	46	29	4	5	0	6	0	3	1	287	51

=== International ===
As of match played 16 November 2026

Appearances and goals by national team and year
National team	Year	Apps	Goals
Iceland	2018	1	0
Iceland	2019	2	1
Iceland	2020	3	0
Iceland	2021	10	1
Iceland	2022	8	2
Iceland	2023	9	0
Iceland	2024	9	2
Iceland	2025	10	0
Iceland	2026	6	0
Total		58	6

Scores and results list Iceland's goal tally first, score column indicates score after each Jón Dagur goal.

List of international goals scored by Jón Dagur Þorsteinsson
No.	Date	Venue	Opponent	Score	Result	Competition
1	11 January 2019	Khalifa International Stadium, Doha, Qatar	Sweden	2–2	2–2	Friendly
2	14 November 2021	Toše Proeski Arena, Skopje, North Macedonia	North Macedonia	1–1	1–3	2022 FIFA World Cup qualification
3	6 June 2022	Laugardalsvöllur, Reykjavík, Iceland	Albania	1–1	1–1	2022–23 UEFA Nations League B
4	13 June 2022	Laugardalsvöllur, Reykjavík, Iceland	Israel	1–0	2–2	2022–23 UEFA Nations League B
5	7 June 2024	Wembley Stadium, London, England	England	1–0	1–0	Friendly
6	6 September 2024	Laugardalsvöllur, Reykjavík, Iceland	Montenegro	2–0	2–0	2024–25 UEFA Nations League B
