= 2024–25 FC Nordsjælland season =

FC Nordsjælland
2024–25 season
- Chairman: Tom Vernon
- Head Coach: Jens Fønsskov Olsen
- Stadium: Right to Dream Park
- Danish Superliga: 5th
- Danish Cup: Fourth round
| Home colours | Away colours | Third colours |

The 2024–25 season was the 35th season in the history of FC Nordsjælland, and the club's 22nd consecutive season in the Danish Superliga. In addition to the domestic league, the team participated in the Danish Cup.

== Transfers ==
=== In ===
| Pos. | Name | From | Fee | Ref |
|---|---|---|---|---|
| DMF | (Denmark) Mark Brink | (Denmark) Silkeborg IF | ₹11.8 Cr | |
| DF | (Denmark) Tobias Salquist | (United States) Chicago Fire FC | ₹2.16 Cr | |
| RB | (Denmark) Peter Ankersen | (Denmark) F.C. Copenhagen | Free | |

=== Out ===
| Pos. | Player | Transferred to | Fee | Date | Source |
|---|---|---|---|---|---|
| MF | (Ivory Coast) Lasso Coulibaly | (France) Auxerre | Undisclosed | 1 July 2024 | |
| MF | (Denmark) Jeppe Tverskov | (United States) San Diego FC | Undisclosed | 1 January 2025 | |
| FW | (Denmark) Marcus Ingvartsen | (United States) San Diego FC | Undisclosed | 1 January 2025 | |

== Friendlies ==
=== Pre-season ===
| 29 June 2024 Friendly | Nordsjælland (Denmark) | 3–2 | (Denmark) Randers | Farum |
| 14:00 | Iloski 19'; Nygren 78', 90+1' | | Agyiri 48', 64' | Stadium: Farum Park Bane 6 |

| 6 July 2024 Friendly | AZ Alkmaar (Netherlands) | 6–1 | (Denmark) Nordsjælland |
| 15:00 |

| 12 July 2024 Friendly | FC Twente (Netherlands) | 2–1 | (Denmark) Nordsjælland |
| 12:00 |

| 12 July 2024 Friendly | FC Twente (Netherlands) | 0–0 | (Denmark) Nordsjælland |
| 14:30 |

=== Mid-season ===
| 11 January 2025 Friendly | Nordsjælland (Denmark) | 5–1 | (Denmark) B93 København |
| 12:00 |

| 18 January 2025 Friendly | Nordsjælland (Denmark) | 4–0 | (Denmark) Fredericia |
| 13:00 |

| 25 January 2025 Friendly | Lech Poznań (Poland) | 1–7 | (Denmark) Nordsjælland |
| 10:30 |

== Competitions ==
=== Overall record ===
| Competition | First match | Last match | Starting round | Final position | Record | | | | | | | |
| Competition | First match | Last match | Starting round | Final position | Pld | W | D | L | GF | GA | GD | Win % |
|---|---|---|---|---|---|---|---|---|---|---|---|---|
| Superliga | 19 July 2024 | 24 May 2025 | Matchday 1 | 5th | 14 | 6 | 4 | 4 | 27 | 25 | +2 | 42.86 |
| Danish Cup | 25 September 2024 | 23 October 2024 | Third Round | Fourth Round | 2 | 1 | 1 | 0 | 6 | 1 | +5 | 50.00 |
| Total | | | | | 16 | 7 | 5 | 4 | 33 | 26 | +7 | 43.75 |

Last updated: 3 November 2024
Source: Soccerway

=== Superliga ===
==== League table ====
| Pos | Team | Pld | W | D | L | GF | GA | GD | Pts | Qualification |
|---|---|---|---|---|---|---|---|---|---|---|
| 3 | AGF | 22 | 9 | 9 | 4 | 42 | 23 | +19 | 36 | Qualification for the Championship round |
| 4 | Randers | 22 | 9 | 8 | 5 | 39 | 28 | +11 | 35 | Qualification for the Championship round |
| 5 | Nordsjælland | 22 | 10 | 5 | 7 | 39 | 36 | +3 | 35 | Qualification for the Championship round |
| 6 | Brøndby | 22 | 8 | 9 | 5 | 42 | 32 | +10 | 33 | Qualification for the Championship round |
| 7 | Silkeborg | 22 | 8 | 9 | 5 | 38 | 29 | +9 | 33 | Qualification for the Relegation round |

Source: Danish Football Association (in Danish), Soccerway
Rules for classification: 1) Points; 2) Goal difference; 3) Goals scored; 4) Away goals scored; 5) Play-off (played on neutral ground if determining teams for different rounds); 6) Draw.

| Pos | Team | Pld | W | D | L | GF | GA | GD | Pts | |
|---|---|---|---|---|---|---|---|---|---|---|
| 2 | Midtjylland | 32 | 19 | 5 | 8 | 64 | 42 | +22 | 62 | Qualification for the UEFA Europa League second qualifying round |
| 3 | Brøndby | 32 | 13 | 12 | 7 | 58 | 46 | +12 | 51 | Qualification for the UEFA Conference League second qualifying round |
| 4 | Randers | 32 | 13 | 9 | 10 | 57 | 50 | +7 | 48 | Qualification for the European play-off match |
| 5 | Nordsjælland | 32 | 13 | 7 | 12 | 53 | 56 | −3 | 46 | |
| 6 | AGF | 32 | 10 | 10 | 12 | 53 | 46 | +7 | 40 | |

Source: Danish Football Association (in Danish), Soccerway
Rules for classification: 1) Points; 2) Goal difference; 3) Goals scored; 4) Away goals scored; 5) Play-off (played on neutral ground if determining teams for different rounds); 6) Draw.

| Pos | Team | Pld | W | D | L | GF | GA | GD | Pts | |
|---|---|---|---|---|---|---|---|---|---|---|
| 1 | Silkeborg (O) | 32 | 13 | 10 | 9 | 56 | 41 | +15 | 49 | Qualification for the European play-off match |
| 2 | Viborg | 32 | 12 | 11 | 9 | 57 | 50 | +7 | 47 | |
| 3 | Sønderjyske | 32 | 10 | 7 | 15 | 47 | 64 | −17 | 37 | |
| 4 | Vejle | 32 | 7 | 7 | 18 | 37 | 64 | −27 | 28 | |
| 5 | Lyngby (R) | 32 | 5 | 12 | 15 | 26 | 43 | −17 | 27 | Relegation to 1st Division |
| 6 | AaB (R) | 32 | 5 | 9 | 18 | 34 | 67 | −33 | 24 | Relegation to 1st Division |

Source: Danish Football Association (in Danish), Soccerway
Rules for classification: 1) Points; 2) Goal difference; 3) Goals scored; 4) Away goals scored; 5) Play-off (played on neutral ground if determining teams for different rounds); 6) Draw.
(O) Play-off winners; (R) Relegated

==== Results summary ====
| Overall | | | | | | | | Home | | | | | | Away | | | | | |
| Pld | W | D | L | GF | GA | GD | Pts | W | D | L | GF | GA | GD | W | D | L | GF | GA | GD |
|---|---|---|---|---|---|---|---|---|---|---|---|---|---|---|---|---|---|---|---|
| 1 | 1 | 0 | 0 | 3 | 0 | +3 | 3 | 1 | 0 | 0 | 3 | 0 | +3 | 0 | 0 | 0 | 0 | 0 | 0 |

Last updated: 19 July 2024.

==== Results by round ====
| Round | 1 | 2 |
|---|---|---|
| Ground | H | H |
| Result | W | |
| Position | | |

Updated to match(es) played on 19 July 2024. Source:
A = Away; H = Home; W = Win; D = Draw; L = Loss

==== Matches ====
===== Regular season =====
The match schedule was released on 7 June 2024.

| 19 July 2024 1 | Nordsjælland | 3–0 | Aab | Farum |
| 20:00 | Ingvartsen 18'; Ankersen 19'; Hansen 88'; Walle Egeli (yellow card) 90+4' | | Davidsen (yellow card) 50'; Jimenez (yellow card) 86' | Stadium: Right to Dream Park; Referee: Jørgen Daugbjerg Burchardt |

| 27 July 2024 2 | Nordsjælland | 2–2 | Midtjylland | Farum |
| 18:00 CEST | Harder 29' (Antman) 34' (Villadsen) | Report | Sørensen 11' (Şimşir) 45' (Chilufya) | Stadium: Right to Dream Park; Attendance: 4,566; Referee: Jonas Hansen |

| 25 August 2024 6 | Nordsjælland | 3–2 | Copenhagen | Farum |
| 16:00 CEST | Egeli 3' (Ankersen); Ingvartsen 5' (Egeli) (yellow card) 83'; Nygren 30' (Harder) | Report | Óskarsson 54' (Elyounoussi); Vavro (yellow card) 69'; Claesson | Stadium: Right to Dream Park; Attendance: 8,612; Referee: Jacob Karlsen |

| 31 August 2024 7 | AGF | 4–2 | Nordsjælland | Aarhus |
| 16:00 CET | Ingvartsen 10' (o.g.); Kahl (yellow card) 44'; Bech 49' (yellow card) 65'; Anderson 53'; Tingager 89' | Report | Nygren 11'; Egeli 16'; Sertdemir (yellow card) 63'; Dorgeles (yellow card) 65'; Tverskov (yellow card) 76'; Høgsberg (yellow card) 76' | Stadium: Ceres Arena; Attendance: 14,280; Referee: Mads-Kristoffer Kristoffersen |

| 16 September 2024 8 | Nordsjælland | 1–1 | Randers | Farum |
| 19:00 CET | Ankersen (yellow card) 82'; Tverskov 90+6' | Report | Tammer Bany (yellow card) 55'; Campbell 78' | Stadium: Right to Dream Park; Attendance: 3,158; Referee: Michael Tykgaard |

| 22 November 2024 16 | Nordsjælland | 1–0 | AGF | Farum |
| 19:00 CET | Iloski 90+2'; Ankersen (yellow card) 90+7' | Report | | Stadium: Right to Dream Park; Attendance: 4,016; Referee: Aydin Uslu |

| 2 December 2024 17 | Copenhagen | 3–1 | Nordsjælland | Copenhagen |
| 19:00 CET | Robert 41' (Claesson); Delaney 81' (Elyounoussi); Elyounoussi 83' (Delaney); Mattsson (yellow card) 90' | Report | Ankersen 18' (Egeli); Ingvartsen (yellow card) 51'; Tverskov (yellow card) 55' | Stadium: Parken; Attendance: 22,996; Referee: Sandi Putros |

| 2 March 2025 20 | Midtjylland | 2–1 | Nordsjælland | Herning |
| 16:00 CET | Dani Silva (yellow card) 18'; Djú 54' (Şimşir); Bravo 90+2'; Mbabu (yellow card) 90+7' | Report | Nygren 76' | Stadium: MCH Stadium; Attendance: 9,391; Referee: Jakob Kehlet |

===== Championship round =====
| 6 April 2025 24 | Nordsjælland | 0–1 | Copenhagen | Farum |
| 18:00 CEST | Yirenkyi (yellow card) 63' | Report | Chiakha | Stadium: Right to Dream Park; Attendance: 7,788; Referee: Mads-Kristoffer Kristoffersen |

| 22 April 2025 27 | Nordsjælland | 3–2 | Midtjylland | Farum |
| 19:00 CEST | Nygren 3' (Ankersen); Ankersen (yellow card) 54'; Diao 66' (o.g.); Egeli 81' (pen.) (yellow card) 90+2'; Høgsberg (yellow card) 85' | Report | Buksa 31' (Bak); Diao (yellow card) 66' (yellow-red card) 80'; Byskov 87' | Stadium: Right to Dream Park; Referee: Mikkel Redder |

| 27 April 2025 28 | Midtjylland | 5–0 | Nordsjælland | Herning |
| 18:00 CEST | Buksa (yellow card) 16' (goal) 76' (O. Sørensen); Djú 20' (Bak) 33' (Byskov) 41'; Byskov 44' (Gogorza) | Report | | Stadium: MCH Arena; Attendance: 8,891; Referee: Morten Krogh |

| 25 May 2025 32 | Copenhagen | 3–0 | Nordsjælland | Copenhagen |
| 17:00 CEST | Achouri 2' (Froholdt); Larsson 48' (Achouri) (yellow card) 49'; Diks 59' (pen.) | Report | Høgsberg (yellow card) 58' | Stadium: Parken; Attendance: 35,972; Referee: Michael Tykgaard |

=== Danish Cup ===
| 25 September 2024 Third round | Fremad Amager | 0–5 | FC Nordsjælland | Sundby Idrætspark |
| 19:00 |

| 23 October 2024 Fourth round | Brabrand IF | 1−1 (a.e.t.) (10−9 p) | FC Nordsjælland | Brabrandt's Idrætsanlæg |
| 15:00 | Frandsen 68' | Report | Nene 8' | Referee: Lasse Graagaard |
