= 2024–25 FC Midtjylland season =

FC Midtjylland
2024–25 season
- Owner: Anders Holch Povlsen
- Chairman: Cliff Crown
- Manager: Thomas Thomasberg
- Stadium: MCH Arena
- Superliga: 2nd
- Danish Cup: Round of 16
- UEFA Champions League: Play-off round
- UEFA Europa League: Knockout phase
- Top goalscorer: League: Adam Buksa (12); All: Franculino Djú (16)
- Highest home attendance: 12,018 (25 May 2025 vs. Randers)
- Lowest home attendance: 7,224 (16 February 2025 vs. Lyngby BK)
- Average home league attendance: 10,039
- Biggest win: 5–0 (27 April 2025 vs. Nordsjælland)
- Biggest defeat: 1–5 (3 November 2024 vs. Brøndby)
Home colours	Away colours	Third colours

The 2024–25 season was FC Midtjylland's 26th season in existence, and its 24th consecutive season in the Danish Superliga, the top tier of football in Denmark. As a result of Midtjylland winning the 2023–24 Danish Superliga title, the club participated in the 2024–25 UEFA Champions League, and also took part in the 2024-25 UEFA Europa League and the 2024–25 Danish Cup.

== Squad ==
As of 29 March 2025

No.	Name	Nat	Position	Since	Date of birth	Signed from
Goalkeepers
1	Jonas Lössl	(Denmark)	GK	2021	1 February 1989	(England) Everton
16	Elías Rafn Ólafsson	(Iceland)	GK	2020	11 March 2000	(Iceland) Breiðablik
30	Ovie Ejeheri	(England) (Nigeria)	GK	2024	23 April 2003	(England) Arsenal
Defenders
3	Lee Han-beom	(South Korea)	DF	2023	17 June 2002	(South Korea) FC Seoul
4	Ousmane Diao	(Senegal)	DF	2024	8 June 2004	(Portugal) C.D. Mafra
6	Joel Andersson	(Sweden)	DF	2018	11 November 1996	(Sweden) BK Häcken
13	Adam Gabriel	(Czech Republic)	DF	2023	28 May 2001	(Czech Republic) Sparta Prague
15	Christian Sørensen	(Denmark)	DF	2024	6 August 1992	(Denmark) Copenhagen
22	Mads Bech Sørensen (captain)	(Denmark)	DF	2023	7 January 1999	(England) Brentford
29	Paulinho	(Brazil)	DF	2019	3 January 1995	(Brazil) Bahia
43	Kevin Mbabu	(Switzerland)	DF	2024	19 April 1995	(England) Fulham
55	Victor Bak	(Denmark)	DF	2020	3 October 2003	(Denmark) Homegrown
Midfielders
11	Darío Osorio	(Chile)	MF	2023	24 January 2004	Club Universidad de Chile
19	Pedro Bravo	(Colombia)	MF	2024	26 November 2004	(Colombia) América de Cali
20	Valdemar Byskov	(Denmark)	MF	2021	25 January 2005	(Denmark) Homegrown
21	Denil Castillo	(Ecuador)	MF	2024	24 March 2004	(Ukraine) FC Shakhtar Donetsk
24	Oliver Sørensen (vice-captain)	(Denmark)	MF	2019	10 March 2002	(Denmark) Homegrown
58	Aral Şimşir	(Turkey) (Denmark)	MF	2021	19 June 2002	(Denmark) Homegrown
80	Dani Silva	(Portugal)	MF	2025	11 April 2000	(Italy) Hellas Verona
Forwards
7	Franculino Djú	(Guinea-Bissau)	FW	2023	28 June 2004	(Portugal) Benfica U23
9	Ola Brynhildsen	(Norway)	FW	2023	27 April 1999	(Norway) Molde
10	Cho Gue-sung	(South Korea)	FW	2023	25 January 1998	(South Korea) Jeonbuk Hyundai Motors
14	Edward Chilufya	(Zambia)	FW	2022	17 September 1999	(Sweden) Djurgårdens IF
18	Adam Buksa	(Poland)	FW	2024	12 July 1996	(France) Lens
38	Marrony	(Brazil)	FW	2021	5 February 1999	(Brazil) Atlético Mineiro
41	Mikel Gogorza	(Denmark)	FW	2024	27 September 2006	(Denmark) Homegrown

=== Out on loan ===
Note: Flags indicate national team as defined under FIFA eligibility rules; some limited exceptions apply. Players may hold more than one non-FIFA nationality.

No.	Pos.	Nation	Player
—	DF	DEN	Daníel Freyr Kristjánsson (at (Denmark) Fredericia until 30 June 2025)
—	FW	BRA	Júnior Brumado (at (Brazil) Coritiba FC until 30 June 2025)
—	FW	SLE	Alhaji Kamara (at (Portugal) Mafra until 30 June 2025)

No.	Pos.	Nation	Player
—	FW	ANG	Valter Monteiro (at (Portugal) Mafra U23 until 30 June 2025)
—	FW	CZE	Jan Kuchta (at (Czech Republic) Sparta Prague until 30 June 2025)

== Transfers ==
=== In ===
Date	Pos.	Nat.	Name	Club	Fee	Ref.
1 July 2024	MF	(Colombia)	Pedro Bravo	(Colombia) América de Cali	€500k	
1 July 2024	MF	(Ecuador)	Denil Castillo	(Ukraine) FC Shakhtar Donetsk	€4.0M	
1 July 2024	DF	(Senegal)	Ousmane Diao	(Portugal) C.D. Mafra	Undisclosed	
11 July 2024	FW	(Poland)	Adam Buksa	(France) Lens	€4.0M	
11 July 2024	MF	(Norway)	Kristoffer Askildsen	(Italy) Sampdoria	Free transfer	
15 July 2024	GK	(England) (Nigeria)	Ovie Ejeheri	(England) Arsenal	Free transfer	
8 August 2024	DF	(Denmark)	Christian Sørensen	(Denmark) Copenhagen	€500K	
30 August 2024	RB	(Switzerland)	Kevin Mbabu	(England) Fulham	Undisclosed	
31 August 2024	FW	(Czech Republic)	Jan Kuchta	(Czech Republic) Sparta Prague	€2.7M	
3 February 2025	MF	(Portugal)	Dani Silva	(Italy) Hellas Verona	€3.5M	

=== Out ===
Date	Pos.	Nat.	Name	Club	Fee	Ref.
1 July 2024	DF	(Denmark)	Henrik Dalsgaard	(Denmark) AGF	Free transfer	
1 July 2024	GK	(Denmark)	Oscar Hedvall	(Denmark) Viborg	Undisclosed	
1 July 2024	FW	(Denmark)	Jonathan Lind	(Portugal) Mafra	Undisclosed	
10 July 2024	GK	(Nigeria)	Mark Ugboh	(Portugal) Mafra	Undisclosed	
15 July 2024	DF	(Iceland)	Sverrir Ingi Ingason	(Greece) Panathinaikos	€3.50M	
15 July 2024	GK	(Austria)	Martin Fraisl	(Portugal) Mafra	Undisclosed	
16 July 2024	GK	(Denmark)	Valdemar Birksø	(Denmark) Fredericia	Undisclosed	
17 July 2024	DF	(Denmark)	Mikkel Fischer	(Norway) Haugesund	Undisclosed	
24 July 2024	MF	(Brazil)	Charles	(Brazil) Corinthians	€1.60M	
5 August 2024	MF	(Denmark)	August Priske	(Sweden) Djurgården	€300K	
15 August 2024	DF	(Denmark)	Stefan Gartenmann	(Hungary) Ferencváros	Undisclosed	
22 August 2024	MF	(Denmark)	André Rømer	(Denmark) Randers	Undisclosed	
30 August 2024	DF	(Colombia)	Pablo Ortíz	(Slovakia) DAC 1904	Undisclosed	
13 January 2025	FW	(Denmark)	Victor Lind	(Sweden) Brommapojkarna	€250K	
24 January 2025	MF	(Uruguay)	Emiliano Martínez	(Brazil) Palmeiras	Undisclosed	
28 February 2025	DF	(Brazil)	Juninho	(Brazil) Internacional	Undisclosed	
4 March 2025	FW	(Denmark)	Frederik Heiselberg	(Norway) Aalesund	Undisclosed	
26 March 2025	MF	(Norway)	Kristoffer Askildsen	(Norway) Viking FK	Undisclosed	

=== Loans out ===
Date	Pos.	Nat.	Name	Club	Duration	Ref.
1 July 2024	DF	(Iceland)	Daníel Freyr Kristjánsson	(Denmark) Fredericia	30 June 2025	
25 July 2024	FW	(Brazil)	Júnior Brumado	(Brazil) Coritiba	30 June 2025	
1 September 2024	FW	(Norway)	Ola Brynhildsen	(Norway) Molde	31 December 2024	
2 September 2024	FW	(Sierra Leone)	Alhaji Kamara	(Portugal) Mafra	30 June 2025	
15 January 2025	FW	(Czech Republic)	Jan Kuchta	(Czech Republic) Sparta Prague	30 June 2025	

=== Released ===
Date	Pos.	Nat.	Name	Subsequent club	Join date	Ref.
29 March 2025	MF	(Sweden)	Kristoffer Olsson	Without Club		

=== New contracts ===
Date	Pos.	Nat.	Name	Contract until	Ref.
13 July 2024	GK	(Denmark)	Jonas Lössl	30 June 2030	
26 October 2024	GK	(Iceland)	Elías Rafn Ólafsson	30 June 2029	
31 January 2025	MF	(Turkey)	Aral Şimşir	30 June 2029	
22 February 2025	FW	(Denmark)	Mikel Gogorza	31 December 2029	

== Non-competitive ==
=== Pre-season friendlies ===
29 June 2024 Friendly	Midtjylland	2–2	Sønderjyske	Herning
11:00 CEST	Duru 11' (o.g.); Djú 17'	Report	Djantou 70', 73'

4 July 2024 Friendly	Midtjylland	4–0	AGF	Herning
13:00 CEST	Kamara 67' 85'; Nybo 70'; Chilufya 88'	Report		Stadium: Kunstgræsbane 1

10 July 2024 Friendly	Schalke 04 (Germany)	2–4	Midtjylland	Saalfelden, Austria
18:00 CEST	Sylla 16'; Seguin 37'	Report	Brynhildsen 21'; Priske 54'; Kamara 62' (pen.); Gogorza 67'	Stadium: Saalfelden Arena

13 July 2024 Friendly	Sturm Graz (Austria)	3–1	Midtjylland	Irdning, Austria
11:30 and 14:30 CEST	Biereth 24'; Włodarczyk 106'; Aiwu 119'	Report	Chilufya 110'

=== Mid-season friendlies ===
15 January 2025 Friendly	Midtjylland	3–2	Red Bull Salzburg	Algarve, Portugal
16:00 CET	Gogorza 23' (Buksa); Chilufya 65' (Şimşir) 88' (Byskov)		Onisiwo 45+12' (Yeo); Ratkov 63' (pen.)	Stadium: Estádio Algarve; Referee: Flávio Duarte (Portugal)

8 February 2025 Friendly	Midtjylland	2–1	Red Bull Salzburg	Ikast
14:00 CET	Djú 15'; Paulinho 90' (Şimşir)		Elvius 41' (Gammelgaard)	Stadium: Ikast Stadium; Attendance: 400; Referee: Jacob Tornbjerg Rasmussen

== Competitions ==
Competition	First match	Last match	Starting round	Final position	Record							
Competition	First match	Last match	Starting round	Final position	Pld	W	D	L	GF	GA	GD	Win %
Superliga	19 July 2024	25 May 2025	Matchday 1	Second Place	32	19	5	8	64	42	+22	59.38
Danish Cup	17 September 2024	31 October 2024	Third round	Round of 16	2	1	0	1	4	2	+2	50.00
Champions League	23 July 2024	28 August 2024	Second qualifying round	Play-off round	6	3	2	1	10	5	+5	50.00
Europa League	26 September 2024	20 February 2025	League Phase	Knock-out round	10	3	2	5	12	16	−4	30.00
Total					50	26	9	15	90	65	+25	52.00

Last updated: Season Complete
Source: Soccerway

Source: Competitive matches

=== Danish Superliga ===
==== Regular season ====
Pos	Team	Pld	W	D	L	GF	GA	GD	Pts	Qualification
1	Midtjylland	22	14	3	5	42	27	+15	45	Qualification for the Championship round
2	Copenhagen	22	11	8	3	38	24	+14	41	Qualification for the Championship round
3	AGF	22	9	9	4	42	23	+19	36	Qualification for the Championship round
4	Randers	22	9	8	5	39	28	+11	35	Qualification for the Championship round
5	Nordsjælland	22	10	5	7	39	36	+3	35	Qualification for the Championship round

Source: Danish Football Association (in Danish), Soccerway
Rules for classification: 1) Points; 2) Goal difference; 3) Goals scored; 4) Away goals scored; 5) Play-off (played on neutral ground if determining teams for different rounds); 6) Draw.

==== Superliga results summary ====
Overall								Home						Away					
Pld	W	D	L	GF	GA	GD	Pts	W	D	L	GF	GA	GD	W	D	L	GF	GA	GD
32	19	5	8	64	42	+22	62	14	0	2	38	19	+19	5	5	6	26	23	+3

Last updated: Season complete.
Source: Soccerway

==== Results by round - Regular season ====
Matchday	1	2	3	4	5	6	7	8	9	10	11	12	13	14	15	16	17	18	19	20	21	22
Ground	A	A	H	H	A	H	A	H	A	H	A	A	H	H	A	H	A	H	A	H	A	H
Result	D	D	W	W	W	W	W	W	D	W	L	L	W	L	L	W	W	W	L	W	W	W
Position	7	7	6	3	2	2	1	1	1	1	1	2	1	1	3	2	2	2	2	2	1	1

Updated to match(es) played on 16 March 2025. Source: http://www.superliga.dk/
A = Away; H = Home; W = Win; D = Draw; L = Loss

==== Championship round ====
Pos	Team	Pld	W	D	L	GF	GA	GD	Pts	
1	Copenhagen (C)	32	18	9	5	60	33	+27	63	Qualification for the UEFA Champions League second qualifying round
2	Midtjylland	32	19	5	8	64	42	+22	62	Qualification for the UEFA Europa League second qualifying round
3	Brøndby	32	13	12	7	58	46	+12	51	Qualification for the UEFA Conference League second qualifying round
4	Randers	32	13	9	10	57	50	+7	48	Qualification for the European play-off match
5	Nordsjælland	32	13	7	12	53	56	−3	46	

Source: Danish Football Association (in Danish), Soccerway
Rules for classification: 1) Points; 2) Goal difference; 3) Goals scored; 4) Away goals scored; 5) Play-off (played on neutral ground if determining teams for different rounds); 6) Draw.
(C) Champions

==== Results by round - Championship round ====
Matchday	1	2	3	4	5	6	7	8	9	10
Ground	H	A	A	H	A	H	H	A	A	H
Result	L	L	D	W	L	W	W	D	W	W
Position	1	2	2	1	2	2	2	2	2	2

Updated to match(es) played on Season complete. Source: http://www.superliga.dk/
A = Away; H = Home; W = Win; D = Draw; L = Loss

==== Regular season ====
19 July 2024 1	AGF	1–1	Midtjylland	Aarhus
18:00 CEST	Bech 8'; Anderson (yellow card) 35'; Mortensen (penalty missed) 41'; Dalsgaard (yellow card) 90+9'	Report	Buksa 47' (Şimşir)	Stadium: Ceres Park; Attendance: 12,456; Referee: Morten Krogh

27 July 2024 2	Nordsjælland	2–2	Midtjylland	Farum
18:00 CEST	Harder 29' (Antman) 34' (Villadsen)	Report	Sørensen 11' (Şimşir) 45' (Chilufya)	Stadium: Right to Dream Park; Attendance: 4,566; Referee: Jonas Hansen

3 August 2024 3	Midtjylland	2–0	AaB	Herning
16:00 CEST	Buksa 44' (Sørensen); Brynhildsen 77' (Djú); Askildsen (yellow card) 89'	Report	Widell (yellow card) 45'; Diakhité (yellow card) 90'	Stadium: MCH Arena; Attendance: 8,703; Referee: Jacob Karlsen

9 August 2024 4	Midtjylland	2–0	Vejle	Herning
16:00 CEST	O. Sørensen 39' (Chilufya); Brynhildsen 58' (Şimşir)	Report		Stadium: MCH Arena; Attendance: 8,510; Referee: Morten Krogh

16 August 2024 5	Lyngby	1–2	Midtjylland	Lyngby
19:00 CEST	Sandgrav 73' (Jensen); Winther (yellow card) 90'	Report	Martínez (yellow card) 25'; Djú 64' (Gabriel); Şimşir 90+6'	Stadium: Lyngby Stadion; Attendance: 4,149; Referee: Aydin Uslu

24 August 2024 6	Midtjylland	3–2	Sønderjyske	Herning
16:00 CEST	Buksa 15' (Osorio); Osorio (yellow card) 39'; Chilufya 56' (Gabriel); Juninho (yellow card) 70'; Gabriel 76'	Report	Qamili 4' (Björklund); Wilkins (yellow card) 23'; Agger 33' (Oggesen); Grétarsson (yellow card) 35'; Oggesen (yellow card) 45+2'	Stadium: MCH Arena; Attendance: 7,300; Referee: Jorgen Daugberg Burchardt

1 September 2024 7	Silkeborg	1–3	Midtjylland	Silkeborg
16:00 CEST	Adamsen 29'; Andersen (yellow card) 39'	Report	Osorio 4' (Chilufya); Djú 44' (Andersson); Diao 77' (Kuchta)	Stadium: JYSK Park; Attendance: 7,924; Referee: Sandi Putros

14 September 2024 8	Midtjylland	2–1	Copenhagen	Herning
17:00 CEST	O. Sørensen 69' (Diao); Martínez (yellow card) 64'; Diao 79' (yellow card) 79'; Djú (yellow card) 85'	Report	Diks 31' (pen.); Hatzidiakos (yellow card) 68'; Lerager (yellow card) 72'; Gabriel Pereira (yellow card) 90+1'; Cornelius (yellow card) 82'; Delaney (yellow card) 90+3'	Stadium: MCH Arena; Attendance: 11,599; Referee: Jakob A. Sundberg

22 September 2024 9	Randers	2–1	Midtjylland	Randers
14:00 CEST	Campbell 16' (Nordli); Nordli 45+3' (Greve); Dammers (yellow card) 89'	Report	Djú; Osorio (red card) 65'; Bravo (yellow card) 86'; Şimşir 90+1' (pen.)	Stadium: Cepheus Park Randers; Attendance: 5,808; Referee: Mads-Kristoffer Kristoffersen

29 September 2024 10	Midtjylland	3–1	Viborg	Herning
14:00 CEST	Martínez (yellow card) 26'; Şimşir 39'; Andersson 71' (Djú); Djú 73' (Chilufya); Castillo (yellow card) 90+6'	Report	Westergaard 24' (Anyembe) (yellow card) 90+6'; Renato Júnior (yellow card) 30'; Bürgy (yellow card) 43'; Grønning (yellow card) 50'	Stadium: MCH Arena; Attendance: 11,355; Referee: Lasse Graagaard

6 October 2024 11	Brøndby	2–0	Midtjylland	Brøndbyvester
18:00 CEST	Rajović 9' (Bischoff) 68' (Bischoff); Vallys (yellow card) 90+3'	Report	Diao (yellow card) 46' (yellow-red card) 90+3'; Djú (yellow card) 90+4'	Stadium: Brøndby Stadium; Attendance: 23,274; Referee: Jacob Karlsen

20 October 2024 12	Sønderjyske	3–2	Midtjylland	Haderslev
18:00 CEST	Agger (yellow card) 6'; Qamili 41' (Björklund) 51' (Oggesen); Lyng 78' (Emini)	Report	Kuchta 63' (Sørensen); Diao (yellow card) 73'; Bech 85' (Gorgoza); Buksa (yellow card) 87'	Stadium: Sydbank Park; Attendance: 5,211; Referee: Jonas Hansen

27 October 2024 13	Midtjylland	2–0	AGF	Herning
18:00 CEST	Mbabu 34' (yellow card) 86'; Djú 90' (yellow card) 90+1'	Report	Links (yellow card) 50'	Stadium: MCH Arena; Attendance: 11,161; Referee: Michael Tykgaard

3 November 2024 14	Midtjylland	1–5	Brøndby	Herning
14:00 CEST	Martínez (yellow card) 29'; Buksa 45+7' (pen.)	Report	Kvistgaarden 10' (Rasmussen) 71' 83'; Wass (yellow card) 25'; Suzuki 52' (Sebulonsen) 61' (Rajović)	Stadium: MCH Arena; Attendance: 11,358; Referee: Mads-Kristoffer Kristoffersen

10 November 2024 15	Viborg	1–0	Midtjylland	Viborg
16:00 CEST	Näsberg 39' (Jørgensen); Grønning (yellow card) 85'; Søndergaard (yellow card) 88'	Report	Diao (yellow card) 37'	Stadium: Energi Viborg Arena; Attendance: 8,513; Referee: Sandi Putros

25 November 2024 16	Midtjylland	1–0	Silkeborg	Herning
19:00 CEST	Buksa 36' (Andersson); Mbabu (yellow card) 69'; Andersson (yellow card) 90+5'	Report	Sonne (yellow card) 15'	Stadium: MCH Arena; Attendance: 8,703; Referee: Jakob A. Sundberg

1 December 2024 17	Vejle	0–3	Midtjylland	Vejle
16:00 CEST		Report	Diao (yellow card) 4'; Gogorza 37' (Bak); Andersson (yellow card) 54'; Buksa (yellow card) 61'; Lind 84' (Bravo); Juninho 89' (Bech)	Stadium: Vejle Stadium; Attendance: 6,455; Referee: Jørgen Daugbjerg Burchardt

16 February 2025 18	Midtjylland	1–0	Lyngby	Herning
18:00 CET	Buksa 33' (pen.); Chilufya (yellow card) 89'; Bravo (yellow card) 90+3'	Report	Langhoff (yellow card) 45+1'; Vendelbo (yellow card) 90+5'	Stadium: MCH Stadium; Attendance: 7,224; Referee: Jorgen Daugbjerg Burchardt

23 February 2025 19	Copenhagen	1–0	Midtjylland	Copenhagen
18:00 CET	Mattsson 54' (pen.); López (yellow card) 90+3'; Huescas (yellow card) 90+3'; Ramaj (yellow card) 90+10'	Report	Sørensen (yellow card) 53'; Mbabu (yellow card) 90+3'; Bech (yellow card) 90+4'	Stadium: Parken; Attendance: 31,708; Referee: Jakob Karlsen

2 March 2025 20	Midtjylland	2–1	Nordsjælland	Herning
16:00 CET	Dani Silva (yellow card) 18'; Djú 54' (Şimşir); Bravo 90+2'; Mbabu (yellow card) 90+7'	Report	Nygren 76'	Stadium: MCH Stadium; Attendance: 9,391; Referee: Jakob Kehlet

9 March 2025 21	AaB	1–4	Midtjylland	Aalborg
14:00 CET	Kramer (yellow card) 45+6'; Jørgensen 45+8' (Davidsen); Jasson (yellow card) 76'	Report	Sørensen 11' 89' (Gogorza); Bak 23'; Osorio 78' (Andersson)	Stadium: Aalborg Portland Park; Attendance: 8,599; Referee: Lasse Graagaard

16 March 2025 22	Midtjylland	4–2	Randers FC	Herning
17:00 CET	Djú 5' (Bravo); Dani Silva 14' (Şimşir); Diao 14' (Şimşir); Buksa 74' (Chilufya); Castillo (yellow card) 90+3'	Report	Lauenborg 50'; Dammers 59'; Høegh (yellow card) 89'	Stadium: MCH Stadium; Attendance: 9,821; Referee: Sandi Putros

==== Championship round ====
30 March 2025 23	Midtjylland	0–2	Brøndby	Herning
18:00 CEST	Osorio (yellow card) 77'; Bravo (yellow card) 90+4'	Report	Kvistgaarden 44' (Divković); Vallys 57'; Nartey (yellow card) 73'	Stadium: MCH Arena; Attendance: 11,447; Referee: Jakob A. Sundberg

4 April 2025 24	Randers	2–1	Midtjylland	Randers
19:00 CEST	Dammers 15' (Pedersen) 68' (Nordli); Björkengren (yellow card) 45+3'	Report	O. Sørensen 25' (pen.); Osorio (yellow card) 46'	Stadium: Cepheus Park Randers; Attendance: 6,470; Referee: Aydin Uslu

13 April 2025 25	AGF	1–1	Midtjylland	Aarhus
16:00 CEST	Mortensen 49'; Bach (yellow card) 90+4'	Report	Gogorza 51' (Buksa); Dani Silva (yellow card) 79'; Castillo (yellow card) 80'; Buksa (yellow card) 90+6'	Stadium: Ceres Park; Attendance: 8,023; Referee: Jens Maae

17 April 2025 26	Midtjylland	4–2	Copenhagen	Herning
18:00 CEST	Buksa 29' 90+1' (pen.); Mbabu (yellow card) 30'; Gogorza 39' (Mbabu); Diao 86' (Byskov)	Report	Elyounoussi 56' (Achouri); Cornelius (yellow card) 60'; Froholdt 78' (Claesson); Hatziadiakos (yellow card) 90+1'	Stadium: MCH Arena; Attendance: 11,832; Referee: Michael Tykgaard

22 April 2025 27	Nordsjælland	3–2	Midtjylland	Farum
19:00 CEST	Nygren 3' (Ankersen); Ankersen (yellow card) 54'; Diao 66' (o.g.); Egeli 81' (pen.) (yellow card) 90+2'; Høgsberg (yellow card) 85'	Report	Buksa 31' (Bak); Diao (yellow card) 66' (yellow-red card) 80'; Byskov 87'	Stadium: Right to Dream Park; Referee: Mikkel Redder

27 April 2025 28	Midtjylland	5–0	Nordsjælland	Herning
18:00 CEST	Buksa (yellow card) 16' (goal) 76' (O. Sørensen); Djú 20' (Bak) 33' (Byskov) 41'; Byskov 44' (Gogorza)	Report		Stadium: MCH Arena; Attendance: 8,891; Referee: Morten Krogh

4 May 2025 29	Midtjylland	3–1	AGF	Herning
18:00 CEST	Castillo (yellow card) 7'; O. Sørensen 22' (pen.); Byskov (red card) 73'; Djú 83' (pen.); Osorio 88' (Djú)	Report	Bech (yellow card) 21' (yellow-red card) 85'; Arnstad 59' (Bach)	Stadium: MCH Arena; Attendance: 11,303; Referee: Jonas Hansen

11 May 2025 30	Copenhagen	1–1	Midtjylland	Copenhagen
20:00 CEST	Delaney (yellow card) 77' (goal) 83' (Elyounoussi)	Report	O. Sørensen 38' (Lee Han-beom); Gogorza (yellow card) 53'; Mbabu (yellow card) 75'; Bravo (yellow card) 80'; Osorio (yellow card) 85'; Paulinho (yellow card) 90+1'	Stadium: Parken; Attendance: 34,418; Referee: Mikkel Redder

19 May 2025 31	Brøndby	1–2	Midtjylland	Brøndbyvester
19:00 CEST	Sebulonsen (yellow card) 43'; Kvistgaarden (yellow card) 47' (goal) 63' (Wass); Alves (yellow card) 64'; Rasmussen (yellow card) 90+6'	Report	Mbabu (yellow card) 45+2'; Wass 47' (o.g.); Osorio (yellow card) 50'; Buksa 70' (yellow card) 90+4'	Stadium: Brøndby Stadium; Attendance: 20,982; Referee: Michael Tykgaard

25 May 2025 32	Midtjylland	3–2	Randers	Herning
17:00 CEST	Mbabu 13' (Bech); Chilufya 84' (Osorio) 90' (O. Sørensen)	Report	Nordli 37' (pen.); Pedersen (yellow card) 49'; Mahmoud 73' (Rømer) (yellow card) 89'; Danho (yellow card) 86'	Stadium: MCH Arena; Attendance: 12,018; Referee: Jakob Kehlet

=== Danish Cup ===
23 September 2024 Third round	Hillerød	1–4	Midtjylland	Herning
TBD CEST	Allen (yellow card) 44'; Justinussen 61' (Kucukyildiz); Due Grandt (yellow card) 76'	Report	Kuchta 18'; Şimşir 31' (Kuchta); Askildsen (yellow card) 82'; Djú 89'; Chilufya 90+4' (Gogorza)	Stadium: MCH Arena; Attendance: 3,500; Referee: Aydin Uslu
Note: Despite being a home game for Hillerød, this fixture was played at MCH Arena due to a lack of availability at Hillerød's primary ground.

31 October 2024 Round of 16	Brøndby	1–0	Midtjylland	Brøndbyvester
20:00 CEST	Rajović 18' (Bischoff) (red card) 53'; Alves (yellow card) 42'; Suzuki (yellow card) 52'	Report	Osorio (yellow card) 52'; Diao (yellow card) 61'; Andersson (yellow card) 88'; Kuchta (yellow card) 90'; Buksa (yellow card) 90+5'	Stadium: Brøndby Stadium; Referee: Jakob Kehlet

=== UEFA Champions League ===
==== Second qualifying round ====
23 July 2024 First leg	Santa Coloma (Andorra)	0–3	Midtjylland	Andorra la Vella
20:00 CEST	Mohedano (yellow card) 70'; García (yellow card) 73'	Report	Djú 12'; Diao 28' (Bak); Şimşir 63' (Chilufya)	Stadium: Estadi Nacional; Attendance: 664; Referee: Abdulkadir Bitigen (Turkey)

31 July 2024 Second leg	Midtjylland	1–0 (4–0 agg.)	(Andorra) Santa Coloma	Herning
19:15 CEST	Gabriel (yellow card) 60'; Osorio 72' (Djú)	Report	González (yellow card) 13'; Lluch (yellow card) 22' (yellow-red card) 47'; Dacu (yellow card) 56'; El Ghazoui (yellow card) 58'	Stadium: MCH Arena; Attendance: 7,917; Referee: Rob Hennessy (Republic of Ireland)

==== Third qualifying round ====
6 August 2024 First leg	Midtjylland	2–0	(Hungary) Ferencváros	Herning
19:15 CEST	Buksa 17'; Şimşir (penalty missed) 45+4; Djú 69' (Şimşir)	Report	Raul Gustavo (yellow card) 18'; Cissé (yellow card) 42'; Abu Fani (yellow card) 74'; Rommens (yellow card) 83'	Stadium: MCH Arena; Attendance: 8,449; Referee: Matej Jug (Slovenia)

13 August 2024 Second leg	Ferencváros (Hungary)	1–1 (1–3 agg.)	Midtjylland	Budapest (Hungary)
20:00 CEST	Cissé 17'; Ramírez (yellow card) 39'; Zachariassen (yellow card) 67'; Botka (yellow card) 76'; Kady Borges (yellow card) 87'; Raul Gustavo (red card) 90+7'	Report	Askildsen (yellow card) 6'; Sørensen 50' (Djú); Andersson (yellow card) 69'	Stadium: Groupama Arena; Attendance: 18,027; Referee: Orel Grinfeld (Israel)

==== Playoff round ====
21 August 2024 First leg	Midtjylland	1–1	(Slovakia) Slovan Bratislava	Herning
21:00 CEST	Osorio (yellow card) 30'; Chilufya 79' (O. Sørensen)	Report	Szöke (yellow card) 52'; Blackman 59' (Barseghyan)	Stadium: MCH Arena; Attendance: 9,202; Referee: Alejandro Hernández Hernández (Spain)

28 August 2024 Second leg	Slovan Bratislava (Slovakia)	3–2 (4–3 agg.)	Midtjylland	Bratislava (Slovakia)
21:00 CEST	Tolić 33' (Blackman) (yellow card) 45+2' (goal) 82' (Mak); Wimmer (yellow card) 64'; Barseghyan 86' (Metsoko); Blackman (yellow card) 90'	Report	Şimşir 41' (Djú); Djú; Diao (yellow card) 64'; Buksa (yellow card) 90+6'	Stadium: Tehelné pole Attendance: 21,609; Referee: Tobias Stieler (Germany)

=== UEFA Europa League ===
==== League Phase ====
The draw for the league phase pairings was held at the Grimaldi Forum in Monaco on 30 August 2024, 13:00 CEST. All 36 teams were manually drawn using physical balls. For every team manually drawn, automated software digitally drew their opponents at random, determining which of their matches were at home and which ones away. Each team will face two opponents from each of the four pots, one of which they will face at home and one away. Teams could not face opponents from their own association, and could only be drawn against a maximum of two sides from the same association. The draw started with Pot 1, assigning opponents to all teams, one after the other, and continued with the other pots in descending order until all teams were assigned their opponents.

Pos	Team	Pld	W	D	L	GF	GA	GD	Pts	Qualification
18	(Portuguese Football Federation) Porto	8	3	2	3	13	11	+2	11	Advance to knockout phase play-offs (unseeded)
19	(Royal Dutch Football Association) AZ	8	3	2	3	13	13	0	11	Advance to knockout phase play-offs (unseeded)
20	(Danish Football Association) Midtjylland	8	3	2	3	9	9	0	11	Advance to knockout phase play-offs (unseeded)
21	(Royal Belgian Football Association) Union Saint-Gilloise	8	3	2	3	8	8	0	11	Advance to knockout phase play-offs (unseeded)
22	(Hellenic Football Federation) PAOK	8	3	1	4	12	10	+2	10	Advance to knockout phase play-offs (unseeded)

Source: UEFA
Rules for classification: League phase tiebreakers

Round	1	2	3	4	5	6	7	8
Ground	H	A	H	A	H	A	A	H
Result	D	W	W	L	L	L	W	D
Position	16	9	7	13	20	23	19	20
Points	1	4	7	7	7	7	10	11

Updated to match(es) played on 30 January 2025. Source: UEFA
A = Away; H = Home; W = Win; D = Draw; L = Loss

25 September 2024 Matchday 1	Midtjylland	1–1	(Germany) TSG Hoffenheim	Herning
21:00 CEST	Osorio (yellow card) 22' (goal) 42' (Andersson)	Report	Moerstedt 89' (Kadeřábek)	Stadium: MCH Arena; Attendance: 8,561; Referee: Nenad Minakovi (Serbia)

3 October 2024 Matchday 2	Maccabi Tel Aviv (Israel)	0–2	Midtjylland	Belgrade, Serbia
18:45 CEST	Nachmias (yellow card) 65'; Sissokho (yellow card) 75'	Report	Djú 39' (Şimşir); Chilufya 89' (Askildsen)	Stadium: Partizan Stadium; Attendance: 200; Referee: Giorgi Kruashvili (Georgia (country))
Note: Due to the Gaza war, Israeli teams are required to play their home matches at neutral venues until further notice. Therefore, Maccabi Tel Aviv will play their home matches at Partizan Stadium, Belgrade, Serbia, instead of their regular stadium, Bloomfield Stadium, Tel Aviv.

24 October 2024 Matchday 3	Midtjylland	1–0	(Belgium) Union Saint-Gilloise	Herning
18:45 CEST	Diao 18' (Şimşir); Gogorza (yellow card) 87'		Khalaily (yellow card) 23'; Niang (yellow card) 49'; Mac Allister (yellow card) 89'; Ivanović (yellow card) 90+2'; Burgess (yellow card) 90+4'	Stadium: MCH Arena; Attendance: 8,491; Referee: Sebastian Gishamer (Austria)

7 November 2024 Matchday 4	FCSB (Romania)	2–0	Midtjylland	Bucharest, Romania
18:45 CEST	Tănase 16'; Bîrligea 46'		Buksa (yellow card) 89'	Stadium: Arena Națională; Attendance: 37,152; Referee: Duje Strukan (Croatia)

28 November 2024 Matchday 5	Midtjylland	1–2	(Germany) Eintracht Frankfurt	Herning
21:00 CEST	Bak (yellow card) 5'; Collins 49' (o.g.)		Larsson 7' (Marmoush); Marmoush 57' (pen.)	Stadium: MCH Arena; Attendance: 9,521; Referee: Craig Pawson (England)

12 December 2024 Matchday 6	Porto (Portugal)	2–0	Midtjylland	Porto, Portugal
21:00 CEST	Namaso 29' (Eustáquio) (yellow card) 55'; Samu Aghehowa		Bech (yellow card) 90+8'	Stadium: Estádio do Dragão; Attendance: 32,619; Referee: Aleksandr Stavrev (North Macedonia)

23 January 2025 Matchday 7	Ludogorets Razgrad (Bulgaria)	0–2	Midtjylland	Razgrad, Bulgaria
21:00 CET	Piotrowski (yellow card) 28'; Verdon (yellow card) 43'	Report	Osorio 18' (Bech); Mbabu (yellow card) 52'; Chilufya (yellow card) 80'; Byskov 90+5' (Bravo)	Stadium: Huvepharma Arena; Attendance: 3,847; Referee: Mohammed Al-Hakim (Sweden)

30 January 2025 Matchday 8	Midtjylland	2–2	(Turkey) Fenerbahçe	Herning
21:00 CET	Diao 27' (Şimşir); Byskov 86'		En-Nesyri 39' (Džeko); Džeko 47' (Szymański); Söyüncü (yellow card) 76'; Djiku (yellow card) 88'; Fred (yellow card) 90+3'	Stadium: MCH Arena; Attendance: 9,693; Referee: Luís Godinho (Portugal)

==== Knockout Phase Play-offs ====
13 February 2025 First leg	Midtjylland	1–2	(Spain) Real Sociedad	Herning
18:45 CET	Buksa (yellow card) 25' (goal) 38' (Sørensen); Şimşir (yellow card) 51'; Castillo (yellow card) 58'	Report	Jon Balda (yellow card) 2'; Brais Méndez 11' (pen.) (yellow card) 61'; Kubo 31' (Brais Méndez); Aramburu (yellow card) 90+4'; Martín Zubimendi (yellow card) 90+5'	Stadium: MCH Arena; Attendance: 9,401; Referee: Orel Grinfeld (Israel)

20 February 2025 Second leg	Real Sociedad (Spain)	5–2 (7–3 agg.)	Midtjylland	San Sebastián, Spain
21:00 CET	Brais Méndez 5'; Sučić 18' (Barrenetxea) 45+1'; Jon Olasagasti (yellow card) 66'; Mikel Oyarzabal 73' (pen.); Óskarsson 90' (Zakharyan)	Report	Buksa 24' (pen.) (yellow card) 30'; Osorio 38' (Buksa); Paulinho (yellow card) 42'; Dani Silva (red card) 69'	Stadium: Reale Arena; Attendance: 27,728; Referee: Serdar Gözübüyük (Netherlands)

== Statistics ==
As of 25 May 2025

=== Appearances and goals ===
No.	Pos	Nat	Player	Total		Superliga		Danish Cup		Champions League		Europa League	
No.	Pos	Nat	Player	Apps	Goals	Apps	Goals	Apps	Goals	Apps	Goals	Apps	Goals
1	GK	(Denmark) DEN	Jonas Lössl	18	0	10	0	2	0	1	0	4+1	0
3	DF	(South Korea) KOR	Lee Han-beom	12	0	8+2	0	1	0	1	0	0	0
4	DF	(Senegal) SEN	Ousmane Diao	42	7	24+1	4	2	0	5	1	10	2
6	DF	(Sweden) SWE	Joel Andersson	42	1	15+10	1	2	0	4+1	0	10	0
7	FW	(Guinea-Bissau) GBS	Franculino Djú	41	16	22+6	11	0+1	1	4+2	3	2+4	1
9	FW	(Norway) NOR	Ola Brynhildsen	11	2	3+3	2	0	0	1+4	0	0	0
11	MF	(Chile) CHI	Darío Osorio	38	6	18+5	2	0+1	0	6	1	8	3
13	DF	(Czech Republic) CZE	Adam Gabriel	20	1	5+6	1	0	0	2+4	0	2+1	0
14	FW	(Zambia) ZAM	Edward Chilufya	28	6	6+12	3	1	1	1+3	1	2+3	1
15	DF	(Denmark) DEN	Christian Sørensen	5	0	1+3	0	0+1	0	0	0	0	0
16	GK	(Iceland) ISL	Elías Rafn Ólafsson	33	0	22	0	0	0	5	0	6	0
18	FW	(Poland) POL	Adam Buksa	38	15	18+5	12	1	0	6	1	8	2
19	MF	(Colombia) COL	Pedro Bravo	34	1	14+9	1	1	0	0	0	1+9	0
20	MF	(Denmark) DEN	Valdemar Byskov	33	4	10+11	2	1+1	0	0+1	0	1+8	2
21	MF	(Ecuador) ECU	Denil Castillo	36	1	11+11	1	2	0	3+1	0	7+1	0
22	DF	(Denmark) DEN	Mads Bech Sørensen	49	1	30+1	1	2	0	6	0	10	0
24	DF	(Denmark) DEN	Oliver Sørensen	42	10	26+2	9	1+1	0	5	1	7	0
25	FW	(Czech Republic) CZE	Jan Kuchta	16	2	7+2	1	1+1	1	0	0	2+3	0
29	DF	(Brazil) BRA	Paulinho	18	0	4+8	0	0	0	0	0	4+2	0
33	MF	(Denmark) DEN	Sofus Johannesen	1	0	0+1	0	0	0	0	0	0	0
41	FW	(Denmark) DEN	Mikel Gogorza	29	3	10+9	3	1+1	0	0+1	0	3+4	0
43	DF	(Switzerland) SUI	Kevin Mbabu	31	2	22+1	2	0+1	0	0	0	6+1	0
45	FW	(Sierra Leone) SLE	Alhaji Kamara	3	0	0+2	0	0	0	0+1	0	0	0
55	DF	(Denmark) DEN	Victor Bak Jensen	33	1	18+2	1	1+1	0	1	0	2+8	0
58	FW	(Turkey) TUR	Aral Şimşir	37	6	16+7	3	1	1	4+2	2	7	0
80	MF	(Portugal) POR	Dani Silva	15	1	11+2	1	0	0	0	0	2	0
Players who left Midtjylland during the season:
2	MF	(Denmark) DEN	André Rømer	7	0	1+3	0	0	0	0+3	0	0	0
5	MF	(Uruguay) URU	Emiliano Martínez	27	0	13+2	0	1	0	4+1	0	6	0
15	DF	(Denmark) DEN	Christian Sørensen	3	0	2	0	0	0	1	0	0	0
53	FW	(Denmark) DEN	Victor Lind	4	1	0+3	1	0	0	0	0	0+1	0
73	DF	(Brazil) BRA	Juninho	16	1	4+5	1	0+1	0	5	0	0+1	0
17	MF	(Norway) NOR	Kristoffer Askildsen	21	0	6+6	0	1	0	2+3	0	0+3	0

=== Goal scorers ===
Place	Position	Nation	Number	Name	Superliga	Pokalen	Champions League	Europa League	Total
1	FW	(Guinea-Bissau)	7	Franculino Djú	11	1	3	1	16
1	FW	(Poland)	18	Adam Buksa	12	0	1	2	15
3	MF	(Denmark)	24	Oliver Sørensen	9	0	1	0	10
4	DF	(Senegal)	4	Ousmane Diao	4	0	1	2	7
4	MF	(Chile)	11	Darío Osorio	3	0	1	3	7
6	MF	(Turkey)	58	Aral Şimşir	3	1	2	0	6
6	FW	(Zambia)	14	Edward Chilufya	3	1	1	1	6
8	MF	(Denmark)	20	Valdemar Byskov	2	0	0	2	4
9	FW	(Denmark)	41	Mikel Gogorza	3	0	0	0	3
10	FW	(Czech Republic)	25	Jan Kuchta	1	1	0	0	2
10	DF	(Switzerland)	43	Kevin Mbabu	2	0	0	0	2
12	DF	(Czech Republic)	13	Adam Gabriel	1	0	0	0	1
12	DF	(Sweden)	6	Joel Andersson	1	0	0	0	1
12	DF	(Denmark)	22	Mads Bech	1	0	0	0	1
12	MF	(Colombia)	19	Pedro Bravo	1	0	0	0	1
12	DF	(England)	55	Victor Bak	1	0	0	0	1
12	MF	(Portugal)	80	Dani Silva	1	0	0	0	1
Own goal(s)					1	0	0	1	2
Players away on loan:
	FW	(Norway)	9	Ola Brynhildsen	2	0	0	0	2
Players who left Midtjylland during the season:
	FW	(Denmark)	53	Victor Lind	1	0	0	0	1
	DF	(Brazil)	73	Juninho	1	0	0	0	1
Total					64	4	10	12	86

=== Assists ===
Place	Position	Nation	Number	Name	Superliga	Pokalen	Champions League	Europa League	Total
1	MF	(Turkey)	18	Aral Şimşir	6	0	1	3	10
2	FW	(Zambia)	14	Edward Chilufya	5	0	1	0	6
2	FW	(Guinea-Bissau)	7	Franculino Djú	3	0	3	0	6
4	MF	(Denmark)	24	Oliver Sørensen	3	0	1	1	5
5	DF	(Sweden)	6	Joel Andersson	3	0	0	1	4
5	FW	(Denmark)	41	Mikel Gogorza	3	1	0	0	4
5	DF	(Denmark)	55	Victor Bak	3	0	1	0	4
8	DF	(Denmark)	22	Mads Bech	2	0	0	1	3
9	DF	(Czech Republic)	13	Adam Gabriel	2	0	0	0	2
9	MF	(Colombia)	19	Pedro Bravo	1	0	0	1	2
9	FW	(Poland)	18	Adam Buksa	1	0	0	1	2
9	MF	(Denmark)	20	Valdemar Byskov	2	0	0	0	2
9	MF	(Chile)	15	Darío Osorio	2	0	0	0	2
14	DF	(Senegal)	4	Ousmane Diao	1	0	0	0	1
14	MF	(Colombia)	19	Pedro Bravo	1	0	0	0	1
14	DF	(Switzerland)	43	Kevin Mbabu	1	0	0	0	1
14	DF	(South Korea)	3	Lee Han-beom	1	0	0	0	1
Players away on loan:
	FW	(Czech Republic)	25	Jan Kuchta	1	1	0	0	2
Players who left Midtjylland during the season:
	DF	(Denmark)	Christian Sørensen	1	0	0	0	1	
	DF	(Brazil)	Juninho	0	0	1	0	1	
	MF	(Argentina)	Emiliano Martínez	1	0	0	0	1	
	MF	(Norway)	Kristoffer Askildsen	0	0	0	1	1	
Total					43	2	8	9	62

=== Clean sheets ===
Place	Position	Nation	Number	Name	Superliga	Pokalen	Champions League	Europa League	Total
1	GK	(Iceland)	16	Elías Rafn Ólafsson	5	0	2	2	9
2	GK	(Denmark)	1	Jonas Lössl	2	0	1	1	4
Total					7	0	3	4	14

=== Hat-tricks ===
Player	Against	Result	Date	Competition	Ref
Franculino Djú	FC Nordsjælland	5–0	27 April 2025	Superliga	

=== Disciplinary record ===
Number	Position	Nation	Name	Superliga			Pokalen			Champions League			Europa League			Total		
Number	Position	Nation	Name	Booked	(yellow card) (yellow-red card)	Sent off (straight red)	Booked	(yellow card) (yellow-red card)	Sent off (straight red)	Booked	(yellow card) (yellow-red card)	Sent off (straight red)	Booked	(yellow card) (yellow-red card)	Sent off (straight red)	Booked	(yellow card) (yellow-red card)	Sent off (straight red)
4	DF	(Senegal)	Ousmane Diao	5	2	0	1	0	0	1	0	0	0	0	0	7	2	0
5	MF	(Argentina)	Emiliano Martínez	4	0	0	0	0	0	0	0	0	0	0	0	4	0	0
6	DF	(Sweden)	Joel Andersson	2	0	0	1	0	0	1	0	0	0	0	0	4	0	0
7	FW	(Guinea-Bissau)	Franculino Djú	2	0	0	0	0	0	0	0	0	0	0	0	2	0	0
11	MF	(Chile)	Darío Osorio	5	0	1	1	0	0	1	0	0	1	0	0	8	0	1
13	DF	(Czech Republic)	Adam Gabriel	0	0	0	0	0	0	1	0	0	0	0	0	1	0	0
14	FW	(Zambia)	Edward Chilufya	1	0	0	0	0	0	0	0	0	1	0	0	2	0	0
18	FW	(Poland)	Adam Buksa	5	0	0	1	0	0	1	0	0	3	0	0	10	0	0
19	MF	(Colombia)	Pedro Bravo	4	0	0	0	0	0	0	0	0	0	0	0	4	0	0
20	MF	(Denmark)	Valdemar Byskov	0	0	1	0	0	0	0	0	0	0	0	0	0	0	1
21	MF	(Ecuador)	Denil Castillo	4	0	0	0	0	0	0	0	0	1	0	0	5	0	0
22	DF	(Denmark)	Mads Bech	1	0	0	0	0	0	0	0	0	1	0	0	2	0	0
24	MF	(Denmark)	Oliver Sørensen	1	0	0	0	0	0	0	0	0	0	0	0	1	0	0
29	DF	(Brazil)	Paulinho	1	0	0	0	0	0	0	0	0	1	0	0	2	0	0
41	FW	(Denmark)	Mikel Gogorza	1	0	0	0	0	0	0	0	0	1	0	0	2	0	0
43	DF	(Switzerland)	Kevin Mbabu	7	0	0	0	0	0	0	0	0	1	0	0	8	0	0
55	DF	(Denmark)	Bak	0	0	0	0	0	0	0	0	0	1	0	0	1	0	0
58	MF	(Turkey) (Denmark)	Aral Şimşir	0	0	0	0	0	0	0	0	0	1	0	0	1	0	0
80	MF	(Portugal)	Dani Silva	2	0	0	0	0	0	0	0	0	0	0	1	2	0	1
Players away from the club on loan:
25	FW	(Czech Republic)	Jan Kuchta	0	0	0	1	0	0	0	0	0	0	0	0	1	0	0
Players who left Midtjylland during the season:
	DF	(Brazil)	Juninho	1	0	0	0	0	0	0	0	0	0	0	0	1	0	0
	MF	(Norway)	Kristoffer Askildsen	1	0	0	1	0	0	1	0	0	0	0	0	3	0	0
Total				47	2	2	6	0	0	6	0	0	12	0	1	71	2	3

== Home attendance ==
As of 25 May 2025

Competition	Total	Games	Average
Superliga	160,616	16	10,039
Pokalen	0	0	0
Champions League	25,568	3	8,523
Europa League	45,667	5	9,166
Total	231,851	24	9,660
