= Sofus Johannesen =

Danish footballer (born 2007)

Personal information
- Full name: Sofus Østergaard Grandjean Johannesen
- Date of birth: 4 May 2007 (age 19)
- Position: Midfielder

Team information
- Current team: FC Midtjylland
- Number: 27

Youth career
- 2022–2024: FC Midtjylland

Senior career*
Years	Team	Apps	(Gls)
2024–	FC Midtjylland	11	(1)
2025–2026	→ FC Fredericia (loan)	22	(6)

International career^{‡}
2022–2023	Denmark U16	9	(1)
2023–2024	Denmark U17	17	(3)
2024–2025	Denmark U18	9	(0)
2025–	Denmark U19	7	(2)
2026–	Denmark U20	2	(0)
- * Club domestic league appearances and goals as of 08:57, 2 November 2026 (UTC) ‡ National team caps and goals as of 12:40, 9 October 2026 (UTC)

Sofus Østergaard Grandjean Johannesen (born 4 May 2007) is a Danish professional footballer who plays as a midfielder for Danish Superliga club Midtjylland. He also represents Denmark at the youth level as part of the Denmark national under-20 team.

== Club career ==
=== Midtjylland ===
Johannesen joined FC Midtjylland's youth academy at 12 years old. He became part of FC Midtjylland's under-19 team during the 2023–2024 season, taking part in the team's UEFA Youth League campaign. The following year, he became a regular starter for the under-19 team, scoring 10 goals in the under-19 team with two more in the UEFA Youth League.

On his 18th birthday, on 4 May 2024, Johannesen made his Danish Superliga debut, appearing in the closing minutes of Midtjylland's 3–1 win over AGF. The following month, on 25 June, Midtjylland announced they had agreed to a contract with Johannesen, keeping him with the club until the summer of 2030.

=== Fredericia ===
Johannesen was loaned out to Superliga newcomers FC Fredericia on 1 September 2025, with the deal set to keep him with the club for the remainder of the 2025–26 season. The deal came just before the end of the transfer window, following an injury to Ovie Ejeheri. His first goal for Fredericia came on 29 October 2025 in the Danish Cup match against Viborg, scoring a goal to equalise the game at 1–1. Fredericia went on to lose the match in a penalty shoot-out. He scored his first Danish Superliga goal on 15 February 2026, giving Fredericia a 1–1 draw versus AGF. His second goal was scored just a week later in the opening minutes of a 2–1 win over Randers, helping Fredericia move out of the relegation zone.

== International career ==
Johannesen has represented Denmark as part of several youth teams, most recently joining the Denmark national under-19 football team. He played 17 games for the under-17 team, and another nine appearances for the country's under-18 team.

== Career statistics ==
As of match played 19 October 2026

Appearances and goals by club, season and competition
Club	Season	League			Cup (Note: Includes appearances in the Danish Cup)		Other		Total	
Club	Season	Division	Apps	Goals	Apps	Goals	Apps	Goals	Apps	Goals
FC Midtjylland	2024–25	Danish Superliga	1	0	0	0	—		1	0
FC Midtjylland	2026–27	Danish Superliga	8	0	1	0	6 (Note: One appearance in UEFA Europa League, five appearances and two goals in UEFA Conference League)	2	15	2
FC Midtjylland	Total		9	0	1	0	6	2	16	2
FC Fredericia (loan)	2025–26	Danish Superliga	22	6	3	1	—		24	7
Career total			31	6	4	1	6	2	41	9

== Honours ==
Individual

- Danish Superliga Young Player of the Month: March 2026
