= Franculino Djú =

Bissau-Guinean footballer (born 2004)

Franculino
Personal information
- Full name: Franculino Gluda Djú
- Date of birth: 28 June 2004 (age 22)
- Place of birth: Bissau, Guinea-Bissau
- Height: 1.86 m (6 ft 1 in)
- Position: Striker

Team information
- Current team: Trabzonspor
- Number: 9

Youth career
- 2019–2020: Olivais e Moscavide
- 2020–2023: Benfica

Senior career*
Years	Team	Apps	(Gls)
2023–2026	Midtjylland	80	(40)
2026–	Trabzonspor	6	(4)

International career^{‡}
2023–	Guinea-Bissau	18	(3)
- * Club domestic league appearances and goals as of 26 October 2026 ‡ National team caps and goals as of 29 September 2026

Franculino Gluda Djú (born 28 June 2004), also known simply as Franculino, is a Bissau-Guinean professional footballer who plays as a striker for Süper Lig club Trabzonspor and the Guinea-Bissau national team.

== Club career ==
=== Early years ===
Born in Bissau, Guinea-Bissau, Franculino Djú was raised in Portugal, where he began his youth career with Olivais e Moscavide before joining the academy of Benfica in January 2020. On 7 August later that year, he signed his first professional contract with the club.

On 10 September 2022, Franculino scored for Benfica's under-23 side in a 3–0 win over Mafra U23. FC Midtjylland vice sporting director Ove Pedersen attended the match and was impressed by the young forward. He later learned that Franculino's contract with Benfica was due to expire at the end of the season. On 2 February 2023, Midtjylland announced that Franculino would join the club after his Benfica contract expired at the end of the season. Following the announcement in February 2023, Franculino no longer featured for Benfica and did not play another match before joining Midtjylland six months later. He finished the 2022–23 season with 13 goals in 11 appearances for Benfica's under-23 side.

=== Midtjylland ===
After playing youth football for Benfica, Franculino joined Midtjylland in July 2023, following concerns that had emerged regarding his identity and legal age. On 13 August 2023, he made his debut for the club against Vejle Boldklub in the Danish Superliga, where he also scored his first goal for the club in a 2–1 victory. On 17 August, just four days later, he scored his first hat-trick in a UEFA Europa Conference League qualification match against Cypriot side Omonia.

During the 2023–24 season, Franculino scored 17 goals in all competitions for Midtjylland. He also won the Danish Superliga with the club that season. Franculino was also the highest-scoring teenager in European football during the 2023–24 season.

On 19 December 2024, Franculino signed a contract extension with Midtjylland until 2029. During the 2024–25 season, Franculino scored 16 goals in all competitions for Midtjylland. Midtjylland finished second in the Superliga that season.

In August 2025, FC Midtjylland reportedly rejected a bid of around €30 million from a Saudi club for Franculino, which would have represented a record transfer fee for a Danish Superliga player. During the first half of the 2025–26 season, Franculino scored 16 goals in 17 league matches and was the Superliga's top scorer at the winter break. In the final match before the break, he suffered an injury that required surgery and ruled him out until March.

=== Trabzonspor ===
On 2 September 2026, Franculino signed with Turkish Süper Lig club Trabzonspor.

== International career ==
Born in Guinea-Bissau, Djú also holds French citizenship from his father. Djú was called up to the Guinea-Bissau national team for a set of 2023 Africa Cup of Nations qualification matches in September 2023. Shortly after, he scored his first goal for Guinea-Bissau in a 2–1 victory against Sierra Leone.

== Career statistics ==
=== Club ===
As of match played 26 October 2026

Appearances and goals by club, season and competition
Club	Season	League			National cup (Note: Includes Danish Cup, Turkish Cup)		Europe		Other		Total	
Club	Season	Division	Apps	Goals	Apps	Goals	Apps	Goals	Apps	Goals	Apps	Goals
Midtjylland	2023–24	Danish Superliga	27	11	2	1	3 (Note: Appearances in UEFA Conference League)	5	—		32	17
Midtjylland	2024–25	Danish Superliga	28	11	1	1	12 (Note: Six appearances and three goals in UEFA Champions League, six appearances and one goal in UEFA Europa League)	4	—		41	16
Midtjylland	2025–26	Danish Superliga	21	17	2	1	11 (Note: Appearances in UEFA Europa League)	4	—		34	22
Midtjylland	2026–27	Danish Superliga	4	1	0	0	6 (Note: Two appearances in UEFA Europa League, three appearances and two goals in UEFA Conference League)	2	—		10	3
Midtjylland	Total		80	40	5	3	32	15	—		117	58
Trabzonspor	2026–27	Süper Lig	6	4	0	0	2 (Note: Appearances in UEFA Conference League)	3	0	0	8	7
Career total			86	44	5	3	34	18	0	0	125	65

=== International ===
As of match played 29 September 2026

Appearances and goals by national team and year
National team	Year	Apps	Goals
Guinea-Bissau	2023	3	1
Guinea-Bissau	2024	10	0
Guinea-Bissau	2025	3	0
Guinea-Bissau	2026	2	2
Total		18	3

As of match played 29 September 2026
Scores and results list Guinea-Bissau's goal tally first, score column indicates score after each Franculino goal.

List of international goals scored by Franculino Djú
No.	Date	Venue	Opponent	Score	Result	Competition
1	11 September 2023	24 September Stadium, Bissau, Guinea-Bissau	Sierra Leone	2–1	2–1	2023 Africa Cup of Nations qualification
2	25 September 2026	Amaan Stadium, Zanzibar City, Tanzania	Tanzania	1–0	2–0	2027 Africa Cup of Nations qualification
3	29 September 2026	24 September Stadium, Bissau, Guinea-Bissau	Nigeria	1–0	3–0	2027 Africa Cup of Nations qualification

== Honours ==
Benfica Youth

- UEFA Youth League: 2021–22

Midtjylland

- Danish Superliga: 2023–24
- Danish Cup: 2025–26

Individual

- Danish Superliga Young Player of the Month: September 2024
- Danish Superliga Player of the Month: July 2025
- Danish Superliga Goal of the Month: July 2025, October 2025
- Danish Superliga Team of the Year: 2025–26
