= Kevin Mbabu =

Swiss footballer (born 1995)

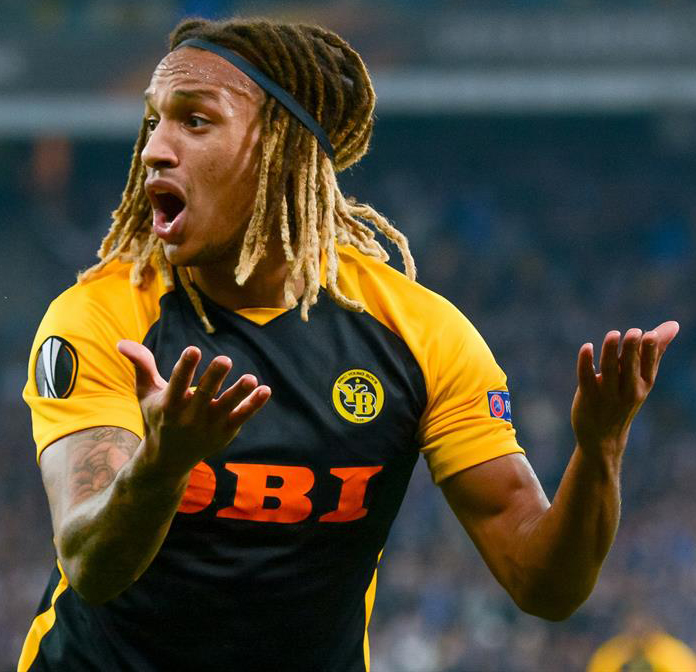
- Mbabu playing for Young Boys in 2018

Personal information
- Full name: Melingo Kevin Mbabu
- Date of birth: 19 April 1995 (age 31)
- Place of birth: Chêne-Bougeries, Switzerland
- Height: 1.85 m (6 ft 1 in)
- Position: Right-back

Team information
- Current team: Sampdoria
- Number: 43

Youth career
- –2012: Servette

Senior career*
Years	Team	Apps	(Gls)
2012–2013	Servette	1	(0)
2013–2017	Newcastle United	3	(0)
2015	→ Rangers (loan)	0	(0)
2016–2017	→ Young Boys (loan)	21	(1)
2017–2019	Young Boys	56	(2)
2019–2022	VfL Wolfsburg	66	(3)
2022–2024	Fulham	6	(0)
2023	→ Servette (loan)	16	(0)
2023–2024	→ FC Augsburg (loan)	25	(0)
2024–2026	Midtjylland	48	(2)
2026–	Sampdoria	1	(0)

International career^{‡}
2011	Switzerland U16	8	(1)
2011–2012	Switzerland U17	7	(0)
2012–2013	Switzerland U18	4	(1)
2012–2014	Switzerland U19	4	(0)
2015	Switzerland U20	2	(0)
2018–2024	Switzerland	25	(0)
- * Club domestic league appearances and goals as of 19 September 2026 ‡ National team caps and goals as of 15 November 2024

Melingo Kevin Mbabu (born 19 April 1995) is a Swiss professional footballer who plays as a right-back for Serie B club Sampdoria and the Switzerland national team.

== Club career ==
=== Servette ===
Born in Chêne-Bougeries, Canton of Geneva, Mbabu started his career at Servette and progressed through the youth team.

At the start of the 2012–13 season, he was promoted to the first team and appeared in number of matches for the side. He made his professional debut as a 66th-minute substitute for Servette in a Swiss Super League match against Lausanne-Sport on 26 September 2012, which turned out to be his only appearance for the club.

=== Newcastle United ===
After a successful trial at the age of 17, Mbabu signed a three-and-a-half-year contract with Newcastle United, moving for an undisclosed fee on 31 January 2013. Upon joining the club, he was immediately assigned to the development squad.

In the second half of the 2012–13 season, Mbabu made his home debut for the development squad on 1 April 2013, in a 2–1 win over Stoke City Development Squad. For the rest of the second half of the 2012–13 season, he quickly impressed for the side and made seven appearances for the development side. The 2013–14 season saw Mbabu appeared in the development squad despite suffering from injuries as the season progressed.

However, in the 2014–15 season, Mbabu was plagued by injuries and affected the first half of the season. On 2 February 2015, Mbabu signed for Scottish Championship club Rangers on loan until the end of the 2014–15 season but he did not play in any games or even make it onto the bench once.

At the start of the 2015–16 season, Mbabu recovered from injury and continued to feature in the development squad. With lack of first team opportunities at the club, he was expected to be loaned out. But he called up to the first team by Manager Steve McClaren following an injuries of defenders and made his Newcastle United debut against Sheffield Wednesday in the League Cup, coming on as a substitute for Daryl Janmaat on 23 September 2015. Three days later, on 26 September 2015, Mbabu made his full Newcastle debut against Chelsea starting at left-back and the game finished 2–2. His performance against Chelsea was praised by pundits. He then made another start in the league on 3 October 2015, in a 6–1 loss against Manchester City. However, he suffered a hamstring injury shortly after that kept him out throughout October. It wasn't until on 7 November 2015 when he returned as a late substitute, in a 1–0 win against Bournemouth.

Two months later, on 9 January 2016, Mbabu returned to the first team in the third round of FA Cup against Watford, where he started and played 52 minutes before being substituted, in a 1–0 loss. Following this, he missed the rest of the season after suffering injuries on two occasions. However, Mbabu went on to make 5 appearances in all competitions, as Newcastle United were relegated from the Premier League after six seasons there. At the end of the 2015–16 season, Mbabu signed a two–year contract with the club. Two years after his departure, Mbabu reflected on his time at Newcastle United.

=== Young Boys ===
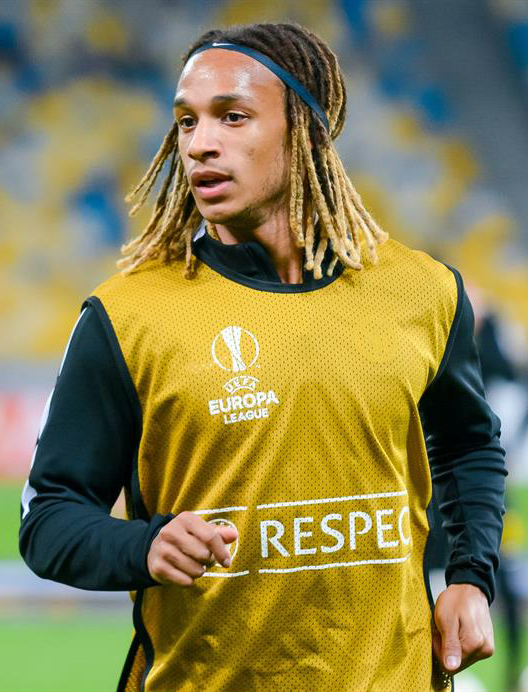
Mbabu training for Young Boys ahead of a match against Dynamo Kyiv on 19 October 2017.

On 23 August 2016, Mbabu completed a season-long loan move to Swiss Super League club Young Boys. However, Mbabu's start of his Young Boys saw him appear on the substitute bench in the first two months there. It wasn't until on 2 October 2016 when he made his Young Boys debut, coming on as a late substitute, in a 2–2 draw against FC St. Gallen. Several weeks later, on 23 October 2016, Mbabu made his first start and played the whole game, in a 4–0 win over Grasshopper. Three days later, on 26 October 2016, Mbabu scored his first goal for the club in the last 16 of Swiss Cup, in a 5–0 win over Grasshoppers.

After missing one match in late–October, he was sent–off in a follow–up match on 3 November 2016, in a 1–0 loss against APOEL in the Group Stage of the UEFA Europa League. Mbabu then scored his first league goal for the club a month later on 3 December 2016, in a 3–1 win over FC Basel. Following this, Mbabu continued to establish himself in the starting eleven, playing in the right–back position for the number of matches. Despite being suspended on three occasions later in the season, Mbabu went on to make 24 appearances and scoring 2 times in all competitions. At the end of the 2016–17 season, Mbabu signed a permanent contract with the club. It was reported that he signed a three–year contract with the club, as Newcastle United agreed to sell him.

In the 2017–18 season, Mbabu started the season well when he started the match and helped the side beat regaining Champions side FC Basel 2–0 in the opening game of the season. He then helped the side keep three more clean sheets in the next two matches against Grasshoppers, Dynamo Kyiv and Lausanne-Sport. He continued to establish himself in the starting eleven for the side, playing in the right–back position. His performance became recognised that there were calls for him to be called up by the national team squad. He then scored his first goal of the season on 1 October 2017, as well as, setting up one of the goals, in a 6–1 win over FC St. Gallen.

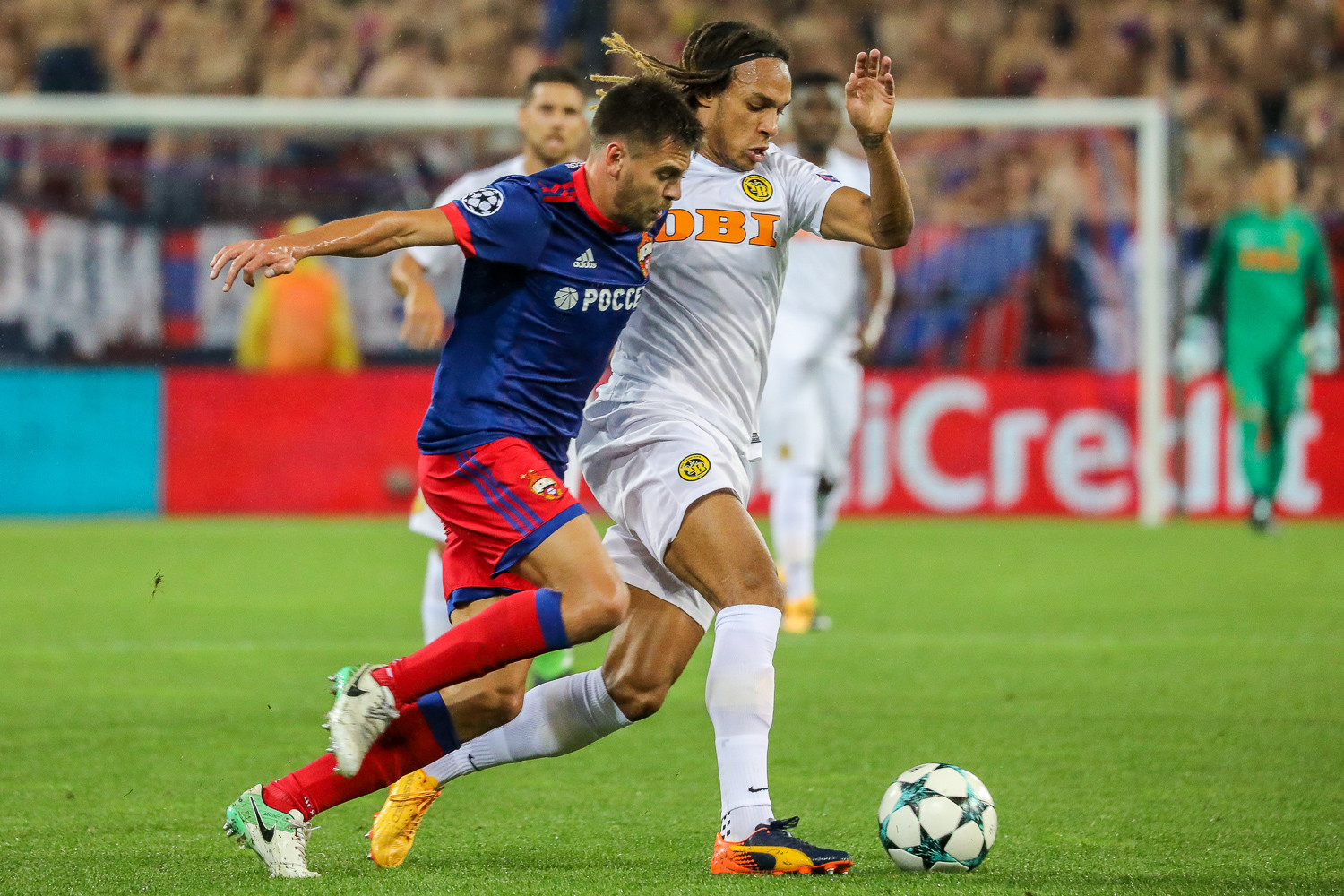
Mbabu and Georgi Shchennikov clashing over a ball during a BSC Young Boys and CSKA Moscow match on 15 August 2017.

Between the three matches on 29 October 2017 and 19 November 2017, Mbabu set up three goals in three separate matches against FC Sion, Basel and FC Zürich. After missing one game through suspension, Mbabu scored on his return on 10 December 2017, in a 1–1 draw against Grasshoppers. By the conclusion of the first half of the season, the club became a title contender, having been at the top of the table.

At the SFL Award Night 2017, Mbabu were among several players to be named Team of the Year. From 17 December 2017 and 17 March 2018, he was involved in the team that saw the side go eight matches winning streak in the league. During the streak, Mbabu was later chosen Player of the Month for this display. Despite suffering two injuries later in the season, Mbabu, nevertheless, was part of the Young Boys squad that won the 2017–18 Swiss Super League, their first league title for 32 years.

=== Wolfsburg ===
On 25 April 2019, Mbabu signed a four-year contract with VfL Wolfsburg, with the player joining the club in July ahead of the 2019–20 season. Mbabu opted to wear the No.19 shirt for Wolfsburg in honour of Junior Malanda who died following a car accident in northern Germany on 10 January 2015.

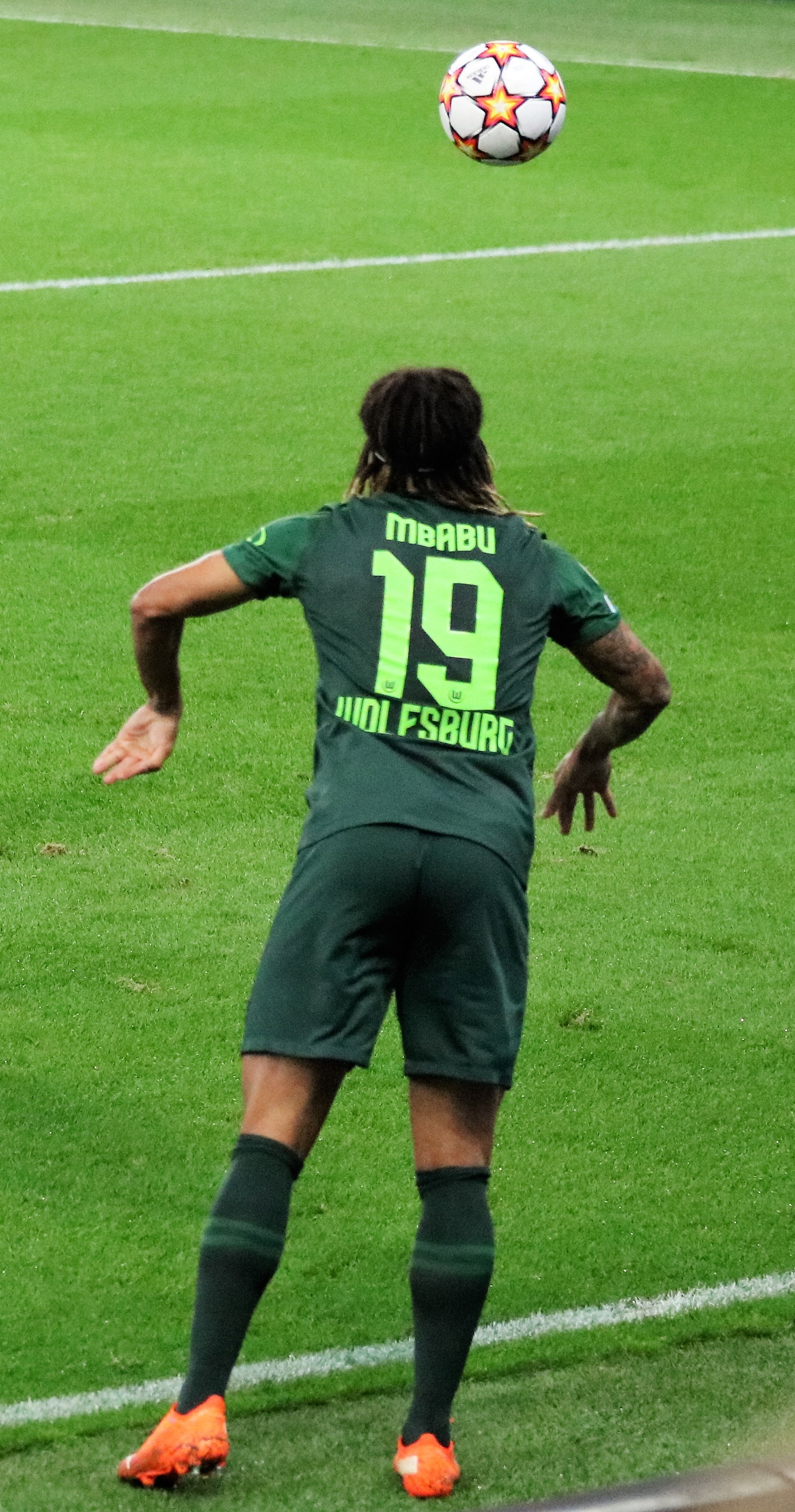
Mbabu in action with VfL Wolfsburg in 2021

On 25 July 2020, during the coronavirus pandemic, it was reported that a COVID-19 test Mbabu had taken on 22 July had returned positive. Mbabu was placed in quarantine at home, and would likely miss a scheduled game on 5 August in Kyiv that had been postponed due to the pandemic. As a precaution, testing was carried out on the athletes before they resumed training, and all other tests carried out on 22 July and 25 July had returned negative.

=== Fulham ===
On 27 July 2022, Mbabu joined newly promoted Premier League club Fulham for a reported fee of €5.5 million with and additional €2 million in add-ons, on a three-year deal, with the option to extend for a further twelve months. "Kevin is a player whom we've pursued for several years. He brings great physical tools to our Club in addition to his vast experience," said club owner Tony Khan.

==== Loan to Servette ====
On 13 February, Mbabu returned to his youth club Servette on loan for the remainder of the 2022–23 season.

==== Loan to FC Augsburg ====
On 1 September 2023, Mbabu joined Bundesliga club FC Augsburg on a season-long loan.

=== Midtjylland ===
On 30 August 2024, Mbabu joined Danish side Midtjylland.

He left the club at the end of the 2025–26 season.

=== Sampdoria ===
On 31 August 2026, Mbabu signed a two-season contract with Serie B club Sampdoria in Italy.

== International career ==
Due to his mixed descent, Mbabu was eligible to play for Switzerland, DR Congo and France. He was a youth international for Switzerland, from the under–16 to under–21 side.

=== Senior career ===
In May 2018, Mbabu was named in the Switzerland's preliminary squad for the 2018 FIFA World Cup in Russia. However, he was cut from the squad after Switzerland's preliminary squad was cut to 26. He made his debut on 8 September 2018, in the starting line-up against the 2018–19 UEFA Nations League match against Iceland. In May 2019, he played in 2019 UEFA Nations League Finals, where his team finished 4th.

In 2021, he was called up to the national team for the 2020 UEFA European Championship, where the team upset favorites France en route to the quarter-finals, where they lost to Spain.

== Personal life ==
Mbabu was born in Chêne-Bougeries, Switzerland, to a Congolese mother and a French father, He has two sisters (one of which is his step–sister) and one brother. However, Mbabu revealed that he never met his biological father and when his mother was remarried, his Austrian step–father raised him and played a role of introducing him to football. As he was introduced to football, he played in the forward position before switching to the defender position.

Alongside his native French, Mbabu reportedly speaks English and German (though he acknowledged the difficulty of the language).

== Career statistics ==
=== Club ===
As of match played 17 May 2026

Appearances and goals by club, season and competition
Club	Season	League			National cup		League cup		Continental		Total	
Club	Season	Division	Apps	Goals	Apps	Goals	Apps	Goals	Apps	Goals	Apps	Goals
Servette	2012–13	Swiss Super League	1	0	0	0	—		0	0	1	0
Newcastle United	2013–14	Premier League	0	0	0	0	0	0	—		0	0
Newcastle United	2014–15	Premier League	0	0	0	0	0	0	—		0	0
Newcastle United	2015–16	Premier League	3	0	1	0	1	0	—		5	0
Newcastle United	2016–17	Championship	0	0	0	0	0	0	—		0	0
Newcastle United	Total		3	0	1	0	1	0	—		5	0
Rangers (loan)	2014–15	Scottish Championship	0	0	0	0	0	0	—		0	0
Young Boys (loan)	2016–17	Swiss Super League	21	1	2	1	—		1 (Note: Appearance(s) in UEFA Europa League)	0	24	2
Young Boys	2017–18	Swiss Super League	32	2	2	0	—		10 (Note: Four appearances in UEFA Champions League, six appearances in UEFA Europa League)	0	44	2
Young Boys	2018–19	Swiss Super League	24	0	2	0	—		7 (Note: Appearance(s) in UEFA Champions League)	1	33	1
Young Boys	Total		77	3	6	1	—		18	1	101	5
VfL Wolfsburg	2019–20	Bundesliga	20	3	2	0	—		5	0	27	3
VfL Wolfsburg	2020–21	Bundesliga	22	0	2	0	—		0	0	24	0
VfL Wolfsburg	2021–22	Bundesliga	24	0	1	0	—		6	0	31	0
VfL Wolfsburg	Total		66	3	5	0	—		11	0	82	3
Fulham	2022–23	Premier League	6	0	0	0	1	0	—		7	0
Servette (loan)	2022–23	Swiss Super League	16	0	1	0	—				17	0
FC Augsburg (loan)	2023–24	Bundesliga	25	0	0	0	—				25	0
Midtjylland	2024–25	Danish Superliga	23	2	1	0	—		7	0	31	2
Midtjylland	2025–26	Danish Superliga	25	0	5	0	—		12	0	42	0
Midtjylland	Total		48	2	6	0	—		19	0	73	2
Career total			242	8	19	1	2	0	48	1	331	10

=== International ===
As of match played 15 November 2024

Appearances and goals by national team and year
National team	Year	Apps	Goals
Switzerland	2018	3	0
Switzerland	2019	5	0
Switzerland	2020	1	0
Switzerland	2021	10	0
Switzerland	2022	3	0
Switzerland	2023	0	0
Switzerland	2024	3	0
Total		25	0

== Honours ==
Young Boys

- Swiss Super League: 2017–18, 2018–19

Midtjylland

- Danish Cup: 2025–26

Individual

- Axpo Swiss League Player of the Year: 2018
- Swiss Super League Player of the Year: 2018–19
- Swiss Super League Team of the Year: 2017–18, 2018–19
