= Edward Chilufya =

Zambian footballer (born 1999)

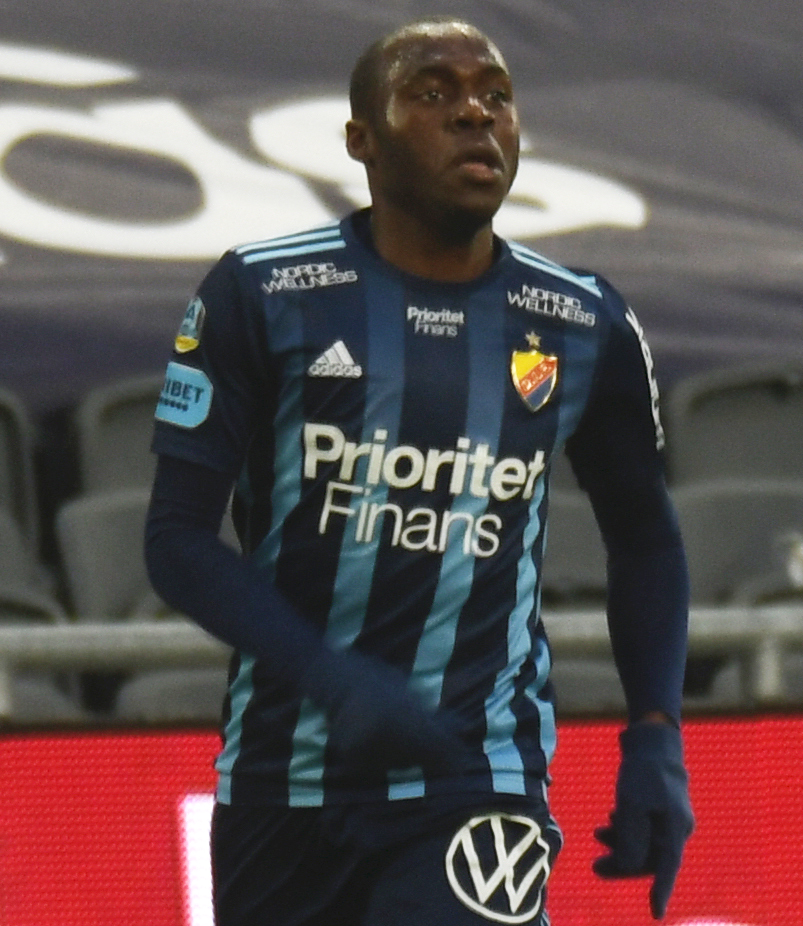
- Chilufya with Djurgården in 2020

Personal information
- Full name: Edward Chilufya Jr.
- Date of birth: 17 September 1999 (age 27)
- Place of birth: Kasama, Zambia
- Height: 1.71 m (5 ft 7 in)
- Position: Midfielder

Team information
- Current team: Midtjylland
- Number: 14

Youth career
- 2016–2017: Mpande Academy
- 2017–2018: Djurgården

Senior career*
Years	Team	Apps	(Gls)
2018–2022	Djurgården	62	(11)
2022–	Midtjylland	75	(8)
2023–2024	→ Häcken (loan)	22	(7)

International career^{‡}
2017	Zambia U20	13	(5)
2019	Zambia U23	3	(0)
2020–	Zambia	23	(2)
- * Club domestic league appearances and goals as of 2 September 2026 ‡ National team caps and goals as of 13 November 2026

Edward Chilufya Jr. (born 17 September 1999) is a Zambian professional footballer who plays as a midfielder for Danish Superliga club Midtjylland and the Zambia national team.

== Club career ==
=== Djurgårdens IF ===
A product of the Mpande Academy in Zambia, Chilufya started training with Djurgården in June 2017. He signed his first professional contract with Djurgården on 15 February 2018. Chilufya made his professional debut for Djurgårdens in a 1–0 Svenska Cupen win over BK Häcken on 12 March 2018. He made his league debut in Allsvenskan in a 3–1 win over IFK Göteborg on 24 May 2018.

=== Midtjylland ===
On 30 January 2022, Chilufya signed with Danish Superliga club Midtjylland, penning a deal keeping him in Herning until December 2026.

On 1 September 2023, he returned to Sweden, signing a one-year loan with BK Häcken. He returned to Midtjylland in the summer 2024 after the loan spell.

On 3 July 2025, Chiluyfa and Midtjylland extended his contract until 31 December 2028.

== International career ==
Chilufya represented the Zambia under-20 national team at the 2017 Africa U-20 Cup of Nations. He helped Zambia win the tournament, scoring in the final against the Senegal U20s in a 2–0 win on 12 March 2017. He ended with four goals, and was joint top scorer for the tournament. He also represented the Zambia at the 2017 FIFA U-20 World Cup, and helped his team make it into the quarterfinals of the competition. He made three appearances for the Zambia U20s 2017 COSAFA U-20 Cup.

Chilufya was called up to the senior national team for a 2018 FIFA World Cup qualification match against Nigeria on 7 October 2017, but could not make the roster because of paperwork issues. He made his debut in a friendly 2–1 loss to Kenya on 9 October 2020.

In December 2023, he was included in the squad of twenty-seven Zambian players selected by Avram Grant to compete in the 2023 Africa Cup of Nations.

== Career statistics ==
=== Club ===
As of match played 2 September 2026

Appearances and goals by club, season and competition
Club	Season	League			National cup		Continental		Total	
Club	Season	Division	Apps	Goals	Apps	Goals	Apps	Goals	Apps	Goals
Djurgården	2018	Allsvenskan	8	0	2	1	2	0	14	1
Djurgården	2019	Allsvenskan	9	1	4	0	0	0	13	1
Djurgården	2020	Allsvenskan	16	2	2	0	3	0	21	2
Djurgården	2021	Allsvenskan	29	8	5	6	0	0	34	14
Djurgården	Total		62	11	15	7	5	0	82	18
Midtjylland	2021–22	Superliga	13	3	3	0	0	0	16	3
Midtjylland	2022–23	Superliga	26	1	2	1	12 (Note: Four appearances in UEFA Champions League, eight appearances in UEFA Europa League)	0	40	2
Midtjylland	2023–24	Superliga	3	0	0	0	2 (Note: Appearances in UEFA Conference League)	0	5	0
Midtjylland	2024–25	Superliga	20	3	1	1	9 (Note: Four appearances and one goal in UEFA Champions League, five appearances and one goal in UEFA Europa League)	2	30	6
Midtjylland	2025–26	Danish Superliga	12	1	3	0	8 (Note: Appearances in UEFA Europa League)	0	23	1
Midtjylland	2026–27	Danish Superliga	1	0	0	0	0	0	1	0
Midtjylland	Total		75	8	9	2	29	2	113	9
Häcken (loan)	2023	Allsvenskan	8	5	1	1	6	0	15	6
Häcken (loan)	2024	Allsvenskan	11	2	0	0	—		11	2
Häcken (loan)	Total		19	7	1	1	6	0	26	8
Career total			156	26	25	10	40	2	221	38

=== International ===
As of match played 13 November 2026

Appearances and goals by national team and year
National team	Year	Apps	Goals
Zambia	2020	1	0
Zambia	2021	3	0
Zambia	2022	3	0
Zambia	2023	5	0
Zambia	2024	6	1
Zambia	2025	4	0
Zambia	2026	1	1
Total		23	2

Scores and results list Zambia's goal tally first.

No.	Date	Venue	Opponent	Score	Result	Competition
1.	7 June 2024	Adrar Stadium, Agadir, Morocco	Morocco	1–2	1–2	2026 FIFA World Cup qualification
2.	13 November 2026	Levy Mwanawasa Stadium, Ndola, Zambia	Burundi	1–0	1–1	2027 Africa Cup of Nations qualification

== Honours ==
Djurgårdens IF

- Allsvenskan: 2019
- Svenska Cupen: 2017–18

Midtjylland

- Danish Cup: 2025–26

Zambia U20

- Africa U-20 Cup of Nations: 2017
