= Pedro Bravo =

Colombian footballer (born 2004)

Personal information
- Full name: Pedro Antonio Bravo Landazuri
- Date of birth: 26 November 2004 (age 21)
- Place of birth: Cali, Valle del Cauca, Colombia
- Height: 1.90 m (6 ft 3 in)
- Position: Midfielder

Team information
- Current team: Midtjylland
- Number: 19

Youth career
- 2017–2021: América de Cali

Senior career*
Years	Team	Apps	(Gls)
2021–2024	América de Cali	5	(0)
2022	→ Orsomarso (loan)	0	(0)
2023–2024	→ Mafra (loan)	33	(0)
2024–	Midtjylland	63	(2)

International career
2019	Colombia U15	7	(0)
2020	Colombia U16	2	(0)
- Colombia U17
- * Club domestic league appearances and goals as of 19 October 2026

Pedro Antonio Bravo Landazuri (born 26 November 2004) is a Colombian professional footballer who plays as a midfielder for Danish Superliga side FC Midtjylland.

== Club career ==
Having joined the club in 2017, Bravo made his professional debut with América de Cali at the end of the 2021 Torneo Finalización, coming on as a second-half substitute in a 2–1 away loss to Millonarios on 17 December 2021. In January of the following season, he was loaned to Categoría Primera B side Orsomarso. However, he did not feature for Orsomarso, and would return to play two more games for América de Cali in the 2022 season.

In 2023, following one appearance in the league with América de Cali, Bravo was linked with a move to Danish side Midtjylland. However, he would go on to join Portuguese side Mafra on loan, with an option to buy, on 15 May 2023. Despite being announced by the Portuguese club, Bravo remained with América de Cali, featuring in a Categoría Primera A game against Atlético Bucaramanga on 17 May, just two days after the announcement.

On 25 June 2024, Midtjylland confirmed that they had bought Bravo, who signed a deal until June 2029.

== International career ==
Bravo has represented Colombia from under-15 to under-17 level.

== Career statistics ==
=== Club ===
As of 19 October 2026.

Appearances and goals by club, season and competition
Club	Season	League			National cup		League cup		Continental		Other		Total	
Club	Season	Division	Apps	Goals	Apps	Goals	Apps	Goals	Apps	Goals	Apps	Goals	Apps	Goals
América de Cali	2021	Categoría Primera A	1	0	0	0	–		0	0	0	0	1	0
América de Cali	2022	Categoría Primera A	2	0	0	0	–		0	0	0	0	2	0
América de Cali	2023	Categoría Primera A	2	0	0	0	–		0	0	0	0	2	0
América de Cali	Total		5	0	0	0	0	0	0	0	0	0	5	0
Orsomarso (loan)	2022	Categoría Primera B	0	0	0	0	–		–		0	0	0	0
Mafra (loan)	2023–24	Liga Portugal 2	33	0	2	0	1	0	–		–		36	0
Midtjylland	2024–25	Danish Superliga	23	1	1	0	–		10 (Note: Appearance(s) in UEFA Europa League)	0	0	0	34	1
Midtjylland	2025–26	Danish Superliga	28	1	7	0	–		15	0	–		50	1
Midtjylland	2026–27	Danish Superliga	11	0	1	0	–		5 (Note: One appearance in UEFA Europa League, four appearances in UEFA Conference League)	0	–		17	0
Midtjylland	Total		63	2	9	0	0	0	30	0	0	0	102	2
Career total			101	2	11	0	1	0	30	0	0	0	143	2

== Honours ==
Midtjylland

- Danish Cup: 2025–26
