= Tobias Bach =

Danish footballer (born 2003)

Personal information
- Date of birth: 4 June 2003 (age 23)
- Place of birth: Bendstrup, Denmark
- Height: 1.93 m (6 ft 4 in)
- Positions: Attacking midfielder; second striker

Team information
- Current team: Vejle
- Number: 16

Youth career
- Todbjerg-Mejlby IF
- Hornslet IF
- 2016–2019: Randers
- 2019: Ikast FC
- 2020–2021: ISI Fodbold
- 2021–2022: VSK Aarhus

Senior career*
Years	Team	Apps	(Gls)
2022–2023	VSK Aarhus	?	(16)
2023	Fredericia	18	(3)
2024–2025	AGF	28	(0)
2025–	Vejle	20	(3)
- * Club domestic league appearances and goals as of 19 May 2026

Tobias Bach (born 4 June 2003) is a Danish professional footballer who plays as an attacking midfielder or a second striker for Danish Superliga club Vejle Boldklub.

== Career ==
=== Early years ===
Bach grew up in the small town of Bendstrup, a village in Aarhus Municipality, close to the village of Todbjerg. It was also here in the small club Todbjerg-Mejlby IF that he started kicking a ball as a child. Later in his youth, Bach switched to Hornslet IF.

After a number of talent sessions in both AGF and Randers FC. Bach was rejected by AGF and ended up moving to Randers. As an U17 player, Bach was sorted out at Randers FC, after which he started at a boarding school in Ikast, playing football under the school team, ISI Fodbold.

After finishing boarding school, Bach started at Aarhus Business College in Risskov. At the same time, he started playing on the U19 team in VSK Aarhus. After a year on VSK Aarhus' U-19 team as a second-year U-19, Bach was promoted to the first team squad, which played in the Danish 3rd Division.

=== Senior years ===
==== FC Fredericia ====
Bach quickly became a profile in VSK Aarhus, where despite his young age, he became top scorer for the club in the 2022–23 season with 16 goals in the league. In June 2023 Bach moved to FC Fredericia in the Danish 1st Division, where he got a contract until June 2026. In six months, he played 24 matches in the Danish Cup and the Danish 1st Division, scoring seven goals.

==== AGF ====
After just half a year in Fredericia, where Bach became a big profile on the team, the Danish Superliga club AGF confirmed on 5 January 2024 that Bach joined the club in a record deal for Fredericia, on a five-year contract. On 18 February 2024 Bach made his debut in a Danish Superliga match against Vejle Boldklub, where he replaced Gift Links in the 87th minute.

=== Vejle ===
On transfer deadline day, September 1, 2025, Bach transferred to the Danish Superliga club Vejle Boldklub on a deal until June 2029.
