= Sindre Walle Egeli =

Norwegian footballer (born 2006)

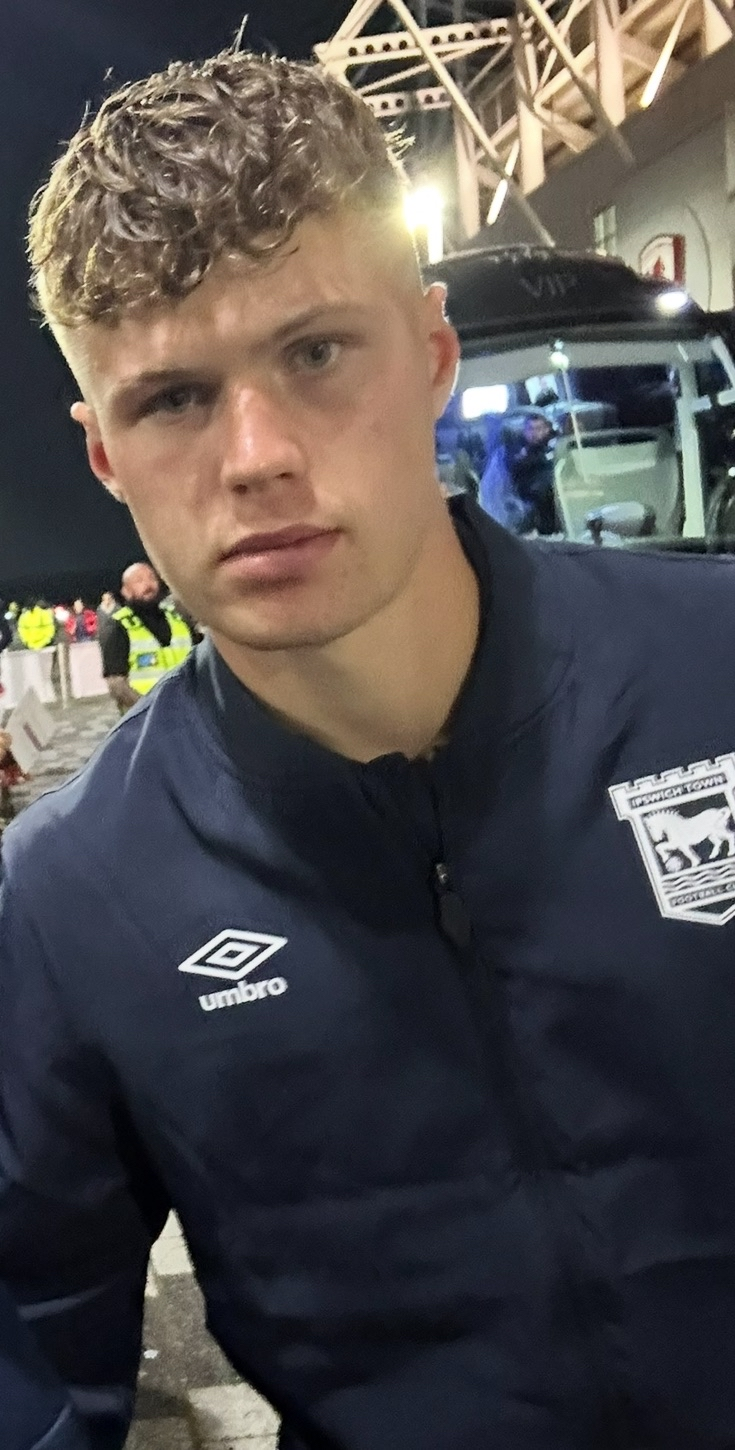
- Egeli with Ipswich Town in 2025

Personal information
- Date of birth: 21 June 2006 (age 20)
- Place of birth: Larvik, Norway
- Height: 1.82 m (6 ft 0 in)
- Position: Forward

Team information
- Current team: Ipswich Town
- Number: 8

Youth career
- Nanset
- 2020–2022: Sandefjord
- 2022–2025: Nordsjælland

Senior career*
Years	Team	Apps	(Gls)
2021–2022	Sandefjord 2	11	(19)
2023–2025	Nordsjælland	40	(11)
2025–	Ipswich Town	29	(4)

International career^{‡}
2021	Norway U15	6	(7)
2022	Norway U16	14	(14)
2023	Norway U17	3	(2)
2023	Norway U18	9	(6)
2024	Norway U19	3	(3)
2024–	Norway U21	16	(10)
2024–	Norway	1	(0)
- * Club domestic league appearances and goals as of 20:26, 23 August 2026 (UTC) ‡ National team caps and goals as of 14 November 2026

Sindre Walle Egeli (born 21 June 2006) is a Norwegian professional footballer who plays as a forward for Premier League club Ipswich Town and the Norway national team.

== Club career ==
Born in Larvik, Egeli spent his youth career between the academies of Nanset IF and Sandefjord. On his debut for Sandefjord 2, he scored all five goals in a 5–0 win against Teie in the 4. divisjon. An unusually prolific striker at youth and reserve level, he was likened to fellow Norwegian footballer Erling Haaland.

In February 2022, it was announced that Egeli would move to Denmark to join the academy of Danish Superliga side Nordsjælland.

On 29 August 2025, Egeli signed for EFL Championship club Ipswich Town on a five-year deal. The reported fee of £17.5 million represented a record transfer fee spent by a Championship club.

On 2 December 2025, Egeli scored his first professional goal in English football. A last-minute equaliser for Ipswich Town against Blackburn Rovers in the EFL Championship. Significant controversy surrounded the goal and game which was being replayed due to the original match having been abandoned in the 79th minute due to a waterlogged pitch in which Blackburn were leading 1–0. His strong start to the season continued in the following game with Egeli scoring his first goal at Portman Road and the first goal of a 3–0 win against Coventry City.

== International career ==
Egeli has represented Norway at under-15 and under-16 level. He continued his prolific club form for both national teams, scoring a six-minute hat-trick against Armenia in qualification for the 2023 UEFA European Under-17 Championship.

Egeli debuted for the senior Norway national team on 6 September 2024 in a Nations League game against Kazakhstan at the Almaty Central Stadium. He substituted Antonio Nusa in the 84th minute of a scoreless draw.

== Personal life ==
Egeli is the younger brother of fellow professional footballer Vetle Walle Egeli.

== Career statistics ==
=== Club ===
As of 25 August 2026

Appearances and goals by club, season and competition
Club	Season	League			National cup (Note: Includes Danish Cup, FA Cup)		League cup (Note: Includes EFL Cup)		Europe		Other		Total	
Club	Season	Division	Apps	Goals	Apps	Goals	Apps	Goals	Apps	Goals	Apps	Goals	Apps	Goals
Sandefjord 2	2021	4. divisjon	6	10	—		—		—		2 (Note: Appearances in 4. division promotion playoffs)	0	8	10
Sandefjord 2	2022	4. divisjon	5	9	—		—		—		0	0	5	9
Sandefjord 2	Total		11	19	—		—		—		2	0	13	19
Nordsjælland	2023–24	Danish Superliga	3	0	1	0	—		0	0	—		4	0
Nordsjælland	2024–25	Danish Superliga	31	9	2	0	—		—		—		33	9
Nordsjælland	2025–26	Danish Superliga	6	2	—		—		—		—		6	2
Nordsjælland	Total		40	11	3	0	—		0	0	—		43	11
Ipswich Town	2025–26	Championship	28	4	2	0	—		—		—		30	4
Ipswich Town	2026–27	Premier League	1	0	0	0	1	0	—		—		2	1
Ipswich Town	Total		29	4	2	0	1	1	—		—		32	5
Career total			80	34	5	0	1	1	0	0	2	0	88	35

=== International ===
As of match played 6 September 2024

Appearances and goals by national team and year
National team	Year	Apps	Goals
Norway	2024	1	0
Total		1	0

== Honours ==
Ipswich Town

- EFL Championship runner-up: 2025–26
