= Victor Bak =

Danish footballer (born 2003)

Personal information
- Full name: Victor Bak Jensen
- Date of birth: 3 October 2003 (age 23)
- Place of birth: Thy, Denmark
- Position: Left-back

Team information
- Current team: Midtjylland
- Number: 55

Youth career
- –2014: IF Nordthy
- 2014–2022: Midtjylland

Senior career*
Years	Team	Apps	(Gls)
2022–	Midtjylland	76	(1)
2022	→ Hobro (loan)	9	(1)
2023	→ Mafra (loan)	15	(0)

International career^{‡}
2019–2020	Denmark U17	10	(0)
2024–	Denmark U21	8	(0)
- * Club domestic league appearances and goals as of 19 September 2026 ‡ National team caps and goals as of 18:22, 21 September 2025 (UTC)

Victor Bak Jensen (born 3 October 2003) is a Danish professional footballer who plays as a left-back for Danish Superliga club FC Midtjylland.

== Career ==
=== FC Midtjylland ===
Bak began his career at IF Nordthy, but switched to FC Midtjylland as an under-12 player, where he became part of the FCM Elite Football School. Bak worked his way up through the youth ranks and began training with the clubs first team squad during the 2021–22 season. At the end of December 2021, Bak signed a new five-year deal with Midtjylland. On 22 May 2022, Bak was called up for his first professional game against Randers FC. He got his debut in the same game, playing the whole second half.

To gain some more experience, the club confirmed on 30 August 2022, that Bak had joined Danish 1st Division side Hobro IK on a one-year loan deal. Bak made his debut for Hobro in a 6–0 defeat against Hvidovre IF on 1 September 2022.

=== On loan to Mafra ===
On 3 August 2023, Liga Portugal 2 side Mafra announced the arrival of Bak on a season-long loan. On 3 January 2024 Midtjylland confirmed that the club had recalled Bak.

== Career statistics ==
As of match played 19 September 2026

Appearances and goals by club, season and competition
Club	Season	League			National cup (Note: Includes Danish Cup, Taça de Portugal)		Europe		Other		Total	
Club	Season	Division	Apps	Goals	Apps	Goals	Apps	Goals	Apps	Goals	Apps	Goals
Midtjylland	2021–22	Danish Superliga	1	0	0	0	0	0	—		1	0
Midtjylland	2022–23	Danish Superliga	12	0	0	0	2 (Note: Appearances in UEFA Europa League)	0	—		14	0
Midtjylland	2023–24	Danish Superliga	10	0	0	0	1 (Note: Appearance in UEFA Europa Conference League)	0	—		11	0
Midtjylland	2024–25	Danish Superliga	20	1	2	0	11 (Note: One appearance in UEFA Champions League, ten appearances in UEFA Europa League)	0	—		33	1
Midtjylland	2025–26	Danish Superliga	28	1	6	1	11	1	—		45	3
Midtjylland	2026–27	Danish Superliga	5	0	1	0	1 (Note: One appearance in UEFA Europa League)	0	—		7	0
Midtjylland	Total		76	2	9	1	26	1	0	0	111	4
Hobro (loan)	2022–23	Danish 1st Division	9	1	2	0	—		—		11	1
Mafra (loan)	2023–24	Liga Portugal 2	15	0	2	0	—		—		17	0
Career total			100	3	13	1	26	1	0	0	139	5

== Honours ==
Midtjylland

- Danish Superliga: 2023–24
- Danish Cup: 2025–26
