= Andreas Oggesen =

Danish footballer (born 1994)

Personal information
- Date of birth: 18 March 1994 (age 32)
- Place of birth: Viborg, Denmark
- Height: 1.77 m (5 ft 10 in)
- Position: Midfielder

Team information
- Current team: SønderjyskE
- Number: 22

Youth career
- Aabenraa BK
- SUB Sønderborg
- SønderjyskE

Senior career*
Years	Team	Apps	(Gls)
2012–2016	SønderjyskE	54	(2)
2016–2021	Fredericia	137	(5)
2021–2023	Silkeborg	38	(1)
2023–	SønderjyskE	85	(0)

International career
2012	Denmark U18	6	(0)
2012	Denmark U19	3	(0)
- * Club domestic league appearances and goals as of 19 May 2026

Andreas Oggesen (born 18 March 1994) is a Danish footballer who plays as a winger for SønderjyskE.

== Club career ==
Born in Viborg but growing up in Aabenraa, Southern Jutland, Oggesen is a product of the SønderjyskE academy, where he arrived from SUB Sønderborg. In 2011, he was on a tryout at German Bundesliga club Hamburger SV, without this materialising into a move.

He made his professional debut on 20 May 2012 in a 1–1 away draw against Silkeborg IF in the Danish Superliga, coming on as a substitute in the 65th minute for Tommy Bechmann. Oggesen scored his first senior goal in a 0–3 away win over Brøndby IF at Brøndby Stadium, in a match played behind closed doors after a series of pitch invasions by Brøndby's fans had led the Danish Football Association (DBU) to suspend spectators at a number of home games.

Following the expiration of his contract with SønderjyskE in 2016, Oggesen moved to FC Fredericia. On 7 January 2021 it was confirmed, that Oggesen would join fellow league club Silkeborg IF on a three-year deal from the summer 2021. In July 2023, Oggesen returned to his former club, SønderjyskE, signing a deal until June 2025.

== International career ==
Oggesen has gained multiple caps for Danish national youth teams, most notably the under-18 and under-19 sides.
