= Ousmane Diao =

Senegalese footballer (born 2004)

Personal information
- Date of birth: 8 June 2004 (age 22)
- Place of birth: Ouakam, Senegal
- Height: 1.87 m (6 ft 2 in)
- Positions: Centre-back; right-back

Team information
- Current team: Midtjylland
- Number: 4

Youth career
- –2019: AS Ouakam
- 2020–2023: AF Darou Salam

Senior career*
Years	Team	Apps	(Gls)
2023–2024	Mafra	46	(2)
2024–	Midtjylland	49	(5)
- * Club domestic league appearances and goals as of 19 October 2026

Ousmane Diao (born 8 June 2004) is a Senegalese professional footballer who plays as a centre-back for Danish Superliga club FC Midtjylland.

== Career ==
=== Youth years ===
Diao was born and raised in Ouakam, a commune in the capital Dakar, where he also started his career in AS Ouakam. In 2019 Diao moved to the football academy Darou Salam - Académie Foot Darou Salam de Dakar - where during his time at the academy he was also selected for the Senegal U-20 national team.

=== Midtjylland and Mafra ===
In August 2022, Diao reportedly signed with Danish club FC Midtjylland. However, Midtjylland never officially confirmed this themselves. In January 2023, Portuguese club C.D. Mafra confirmed that Diao had signed with the club. Several sources - although neither Mafra nor Midtjylland confirmed this - wrote that Diao joined Mafra on a loan deal from Midtjylland, until summer 2024.

In the summer of 2023, Diao was back in Midtjylland and also took part in a training match for the club. He then returned to Mafra, where he became a huge profile for the club in the 2023–24 season. His good performances for Mafra made Diao attract a lot of interest, including from Sporting CP, who according to sources were close signing Diao. On 27 June 2024, FC Midtjylland confirmed that Diao had been brought to the club on a contract until June 2029.

== Career statistics ==
As of match played 19 October 2026

Appearances and goals by club, season and competition
Club	Season	League			National cup (Note: Includes Taça de Portugal, Danish Cup)		League cup (Note: Includes Taça da Liga)		Europe		Total	
Club	Season	Division	Apps	Goals	Apps	Goals	Apps	Goals	Apps	Goals	Apps	Goals
Mafra	2022–23	Liga Portugal 2	13	0	0	0	0	0	—		13	0
Mafra	2023–24	Liga Portugal 2	33	2	2	0	1	0	—		36	2
Mafra	Total		46	2	2	0	1	0	—		49	12
Midtjylland	2024–25	Danish Superliga	25	4	2	0	—		15 (Note: Five appearances and one goal in UEFA Champions League, ten appearances and two goals in UEFA Europa League)	3	42	7
Midtjylland	2025–26	Danish Superliga	22	1	4	0	—		10 (Note: Appearances in UEFA Europa League)	2	36	3
Midtjylland	2026–27	Danish Superliga	2	0	0	0	—		1 (Note: Appearances in UEFA Conference League)	0	3	0
Midtjylland	Total		49	5	6	0	—		26	5	81	10
Career total			96	8	8	0	1	0	26	5	130	13

== Honours ==
Midtjylland

- Danish Cup: 2025–26
