= Ovie Ejeheri =

English footballer (born 2003)

Personal information
- Full name: Ovie Prince Ejeheri
- Date of birth: 23 April 2003 (age 23)
- Place of birth: Greenwich, England
- Height: 1.95 m (6 ft 5 in)
- Position: Goalkeeper

Team information
- Current team: Midtjylland
- Number: 30

Youth career
- 2011–2021: Arsenal

Senior career*
Years	Team	Apps	(Gls)
2021–2024	Arsenal	0	(0)
2022–2023	→ Chelmsford City (loan)	21	(0)
2023	→ SJK (loan)	14	(0)
2024–	Midtjylland	0	(0)
2025	→ Fredericia (loan)	2	(0)
- * Club domestic league appearances and goals as of 08:20, 22 July 2025 (UTC)

Ovie Prince Ejeheri (born 23 April 2003) is an English professional footballer who plays as a goalkeeper for Danish Superliga club Midtjylland.

== Club career ==
Ejeheri joined Arsenal at the age of eight. In August 2021, Ejeheri signed his first professional contract with the club.

On 6 July 2022, Ejeheri signed for National League South club Chelmsford City on loan until January 2023. Over the course of Ejeheri's time at Chelmsford, Ejeheri made 25 appearances in all competitions, keeping 12 clean sheets.

On 19 January 2023, Ejeheri signed for Finnish club SJK until the end of the English season. On 28 January 2023, Ejeheri made his debut for SJK, playing the full 90 minutes in a 1–0 loss against KuPS in the Finnish League Cup. On 8 July 2023, SJK announced Ejeheri would leave SJK after the expiry of his loan deal, with Ejeheri keeping nine clean sheets in 14 Veikkausliiga games during his time at the club.

Ejeheri was released by Arsenal at the end of the 2023–24 season following the expiration of his contract.

In July 2024, Ejeheri joined Danish Superliga reigning champions Midtjylland on a five-year deal. On 13 June 2025 it was confirmed, that Ejeheri had been loaned out to newly promoted Danish Superliga club FC Fredericia for the whole 2025–26 season. After just two matches for the club, it was announced that Ejeheri had undergone surgery for an unspecified injury that would keep him out for an extended period. On 1 September 2025, Fredericia confirmed that Ejeheri had been sent back to Midtjylland as a result of the injury he had sustained.

== International career ==
Born in Greenwich, England, Ejeheri is eligible to represent England, Nigeria or Uganda. In December 2020, Ejeheri was involved in an England youth training camp.

== Career statistics ==
As of match played 27 July 2025

Appearances and goals by club, season and competition
Club	Season	League			National cup (Note: Includes FA Cup and Suomen Cup)		League cup (Note: Includes Finnish League Cup)		Europe		Other		Total	
Club	Season	Division	Apps	Goals	Apps	Goals	Apps	Goals	Apps	Goals	Apps	Goals	Apps	Goals
Arsenal U21	2020–21	—	—		—		—		—		0	0	0	0
Arsenal U21	2021–22	—	—		—		—		—		4 (Note: Appearances in EFL Trophy)	0	4	0
Arsenal U21	2023–24	—	—		—		—		—		3	0	3	0
Arsenal U21	Total		—		—		—		—		7	0	7	0
Chelmsford City (loan)	2022–23	National League South	21	0	2	0	—		—		0	0	23	0
SJK Seinäjoki (loan)	2023	Veikkausliiga	14	0	0	0	4	0	—		—		18	0
Midtjylland	2024–25	Danish Superliga	0	0	0	0	—		0	0	—		0	0
Midtjylland	2025–26	Danish Superliga	0	0	0	0	—		0	0	—		0	0
Midtjylland	2026–27	Danish Superliga	0	0	0	0	—		0	0	—		0	0
Midtjylland	Total		0	0	0	0	—		0	0	—		0	0
Fredericia (loan)	2025–26	Danish Superliga	2	0	—		—		—		—		2	0
Career total			37	0	2	0	4	0	0	0	7	0	50	0

== Honours ==
Midtjylland

- Danish Cup: 2025–26
