= Kasper Davidsen =

Danish footballer (born 2005)

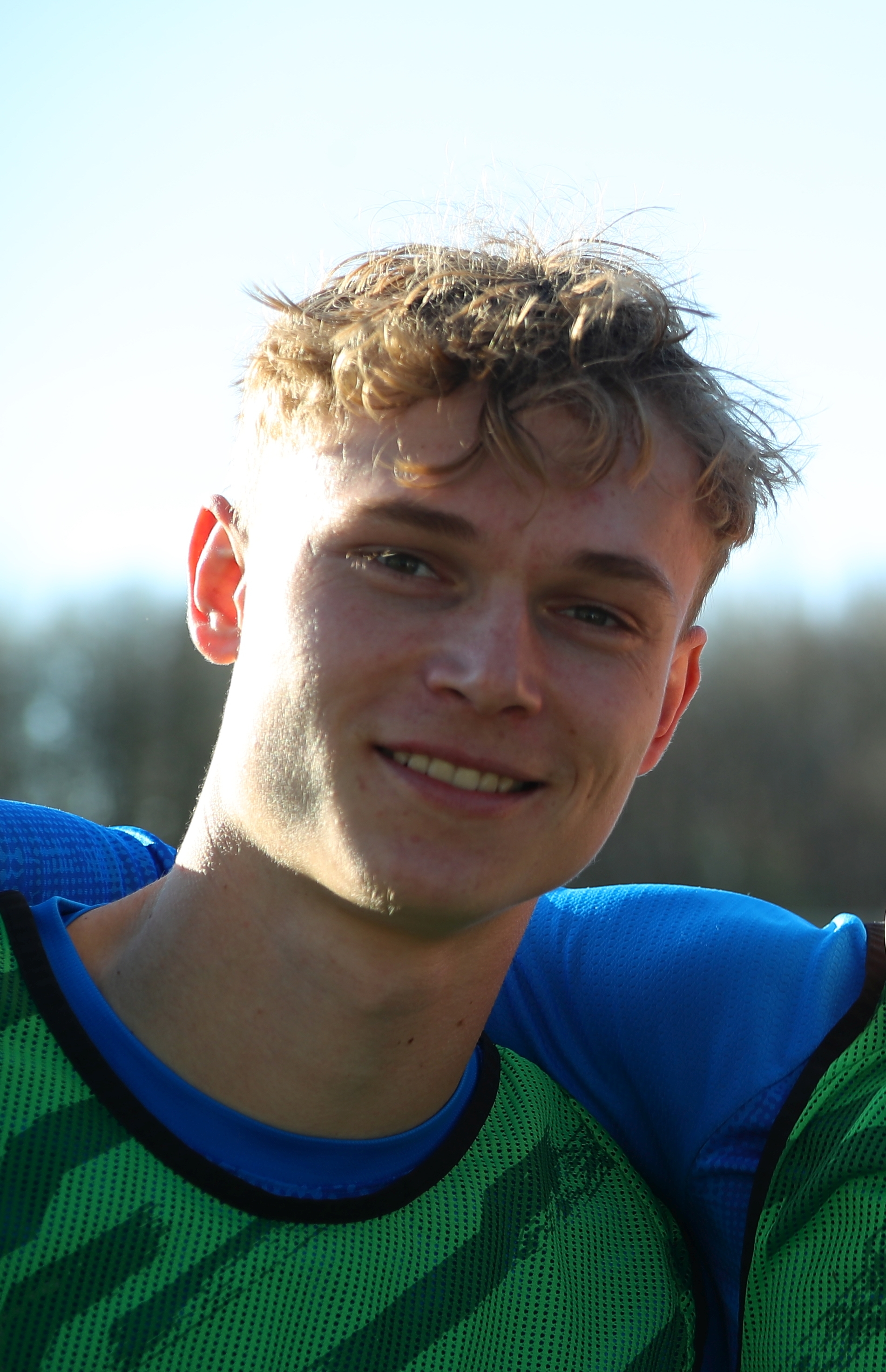
- Davidsen in 2026

Personal information
- Full name: Kasper Stie Davidsen
- Date of birth: 25 January 2005 (age 21)
- Place of birth: Aalborg, Denmark
- Height: 1.91 m (6 ft 3 in)
- Position: Defensive midfielder

Team information
- Current team: Holstein Kiel
- Number: 15

Youth career
- Gug BK
- AaB

Senior career*
Years	Team	Apps	(Gls)
2023–2025	AaB	30	(0)
2025–	Holstein Kiel	28	(3)

International career^{‡}
2020	Denmark U16	2	(0)
2024	Denmark U20	4	(0)
2026–	Denmark U21	3	(0)
- * Club domestic league appearances and goals as of 18 May 2026 ‡ National team caps and goals as of 01:54, 2 April 2026 (UTC)

Kasper Stie Davidsen (born 25 January 2005) is a Danish professional footballer who plays as a defensive midfielder for German 2. Bundesliga club Holstein Kiel.

== Career ==
=== AaB ===
Davidsen joined AaB as a 12-year-old from partner club Gug Boldklub. At AaB, Davidsen worked his way up through the club's youth academy, and in August 2023 made his first-team debut when the 18-year-old midfielder was substituted in a Danish Cup match against Egen UI.

In November 2023, Davidsen extended his contract with AaB until June 2026. During the winter of 2024, Davidsen played more in the first team, where he participated in several training matches. He was also selected for the Danish U-19 national team in February 2024. On 17 May 2024 Davidsen made his league debut for AaB when he came on with 9 minutes left against FC Fredericia; a match where AaB secured promotion to the 2024-25 Danish Superliga. Davidsen made two more appearances before the season ended.

Ahead of the 2024–25 season, Davidsen was permanently promoted to the first team squad. Davidsen made his Danish Superliga debut on 19 July 2024, when he was in the starting lineup in the season opener against FC Nordsjælland. A few days later, on 27 July 2024, Davidsen was rewarded with another contract extension, this time until June 2028.

=== Holstein Kiel ===
On 8 June 2025, it was confirmed that Davidsen had been sold to the newly relegated 2. Bundesliga club Holstein Kiel on a deal running until June 2029.
