= FC Midtjylland =

Danish association football club based in Herning

Midtjylland
- Full name: Football Club Midtjylland
- Nicknames: Hedens Drenge (Boys of the Moor); Ulvene (The Wolves)
- Short name: FCM
- Founded: 2 February 1999; 27 years ago
- Ground: MCH Arena
- Capacity: 12,055
- Owner: Anders Holch Povlsen
- Chairman: Claus Steinlein
- Head coach: Mike Tullberg
- League: Superliga
- 2025–26: Superliga, 2nd of 12
- Website: fcm.dk
Home colours	Away colours	Third colours

Football Club Midtjylland (Danish: [ˈme̝tjyˌlænˀ]; lit. 'Central Jutland') is a Danish professional football club based in Herning and Ikast in western Jutland. The club is the result of a merger between Ikast FS and Herning Fremad. Midtjylland competes in the Danish Superliga, which they have won four times, most recently in 2024.

Midtjylland is based in the western part of Jutland. They have had international stars playing for the club, such as Mohamed Zidan and Alexander Sørloth. Midtjylland also has the oldest football academy in Scandinavia. The academy has produced multiple Danish national team players, such as Simon Kjær, Joachim Andersen, and Rasmus Kristensen.

== Club history ==
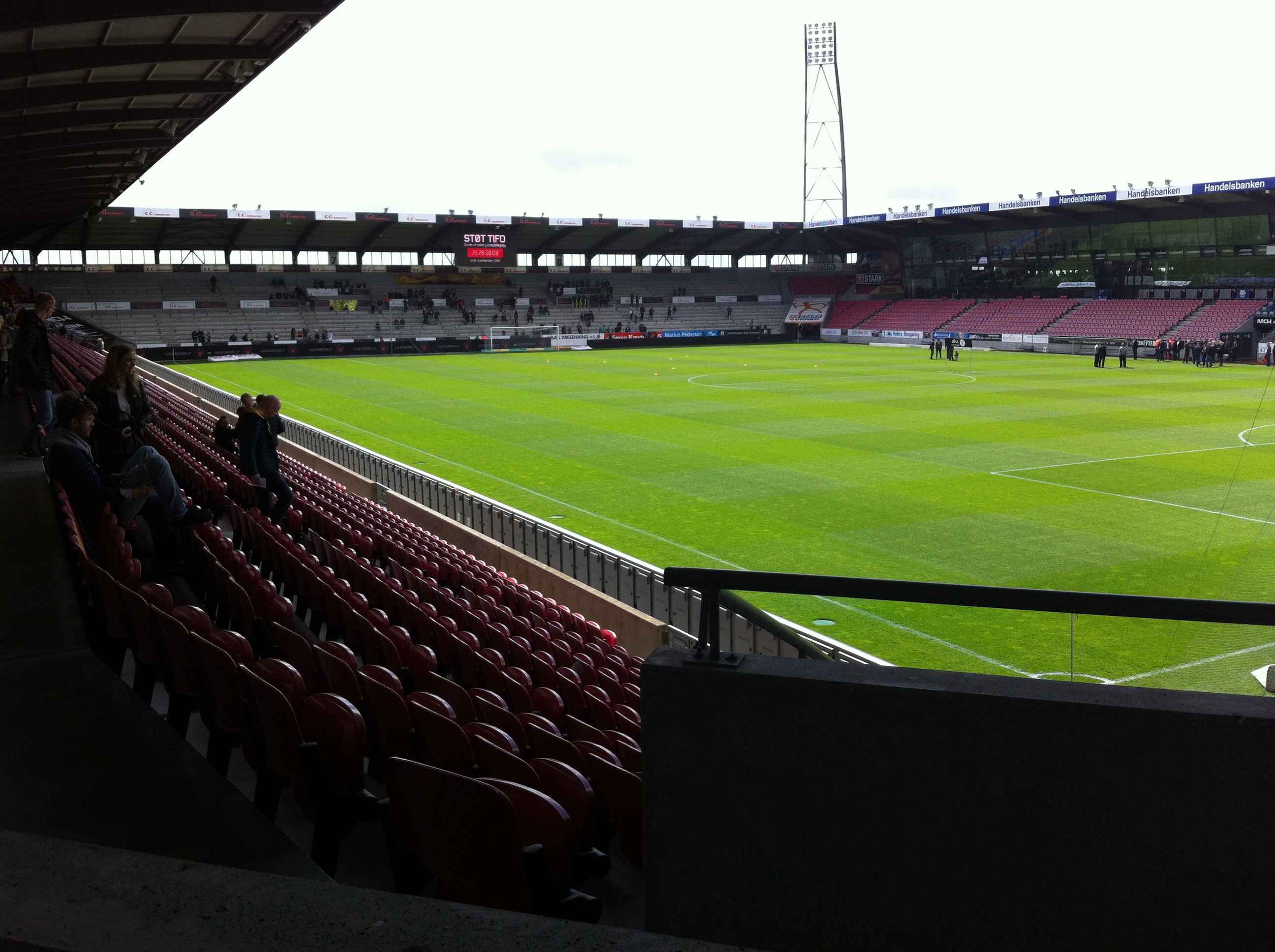
Stadium of FC Midtjylland. MCH Arena

FC Midtjylland was founded by Johnny Rune, a carpenter and owner of a private business in the wood-supply industry, and Steen Hessel, an authorized Mercedes-Benz dealer.

The two men wanted to unite the football clubs Ikast FS (founded 1935) and Herning Fremad (founded 1918) – clubs that for decades had been strong rivals, but had never played any significant role in Danish football. Ikast FS had some success in the late 1970s and '80s and made three Danish Cup final appearances, but had never been a top team in the Danish league. At least ten years had passed with the two clubs being unable to agree on a merger, but on 6 April 1999, a deal was finalised and announced at a press conference the next day.

In 2000, Midtjylland were promoted to the top-flight Danish Superliga after a season in which the team had gathered more points than any other team in the history of the first division.

At the beginning of November 2008, it was announced FC Midtylland had taken over the handball club Ikast-Brande EH, and as a result, the handball team changed their name to 'FC Midtjylland Håndbold' and switched colors from their traditional blue and yellow to Midtjylland's red and black. In November 2017, it was announced that FC Midtjylland had sold off the handball team to a group of investors, and from the 2018–19 season, the handball club were renamed 'Herning Ikast Håndbold'.

In July 2014, Matthew Benham (owner of English club Brentford) became the majority shareholder of Midtjylland's parent company FCM Holding. In the 2014–15 season, they won the Danish football championship for the first time. Later on, they won two league titles in 2017–18 and 2019–20, then qualified to the 2020–21 UEFA Champions League group stage for the first time in their history.

During a celebration of the inauguration of the club's new FCM House, Dream 99 on 15 August 2023, it was announced that HEARTLAND, holding company for the Danish clothing chain Bestseller, purchased Benham's shares and became majority owner of the club, as well as Portuguese team C.D. Mafra. It was also announced that FCM would embark with a women's football program in 2024. On the final matchday of the championship round in the 2023–24 season, Midtjylland clinched their fourth Superliga title by just one point, following a 3–3 home draw against Silkeborg, as rivals Brøndby lost 3–2 at home against AGF.

== Scouting and developing ==
Midtjylland employed a strategy of finding and developing talent, with a notable academy.

In July 2004, Midtjylland was the first Danish club to establish their own football academy, similar to that of French team Nantes. The academy attracts players from throughout Denmark, as well as players from FC Ebedei, a partnering club in Nigeria. The club has developed a network of over 100 clubs located in the western part of Jutland.

In 2008, Danish centre-back Simon Kjær, a talent of the academy, was sold to Palermo for a transfer fee of approximately DKK30 million (€4 million). In 2010, Sune Kiilerich, another talent of the academy, was sold to Sampdoria, while Winston Reid, an academy product and New Zealand international, was sold to West Ham United for DKK32 million (€4.26 million). In 2016, vice-captain Erik Sviatchenko was sold for £1.5 million to Celtic.

Other notable sales of academy products include Pione Sisto to Celta Vigo, Rasmus Nissen to Ajax, Andreas Poulsen to Borussia Mönchengladbach, and Mikkel Duelund to Dynamo Kyiv.

== Stadium ==
In 2004, the team moved to a new stadium in Herning with a capacity of 11,432 spectators. Midtjylland was the first Danish club to sell the stadium naming rights to a sponsor, resulting in the name "SAS Arena" which has since been changed to MCH Arena. The stadium's opening match was on 27 March; it proved to be a success, with Midtjylland beating AB 6–0. Five of the goals were scored by Egyptian striker Mohamed Zidan.

On 22 June 2022, the club started an expansion of MCH Arena that would add a new hospitality lounge and 11 new VIP boxes. The expansion increased the total capacity by 720 seats, taking the capacity from 11,432 to a total of 12,152. The expansion was completed in March 2024.

== Supporters ==
Black Wolves is the official fanclub of FC Midtjylland. It was founded in the beginning of August 1999, as the official fanclub of Ikast FS 1993 "Yellow Flames" changed their name at an extraordinary general meeting. Ultra Boys Midtjylland is the first unofficial faction in Midtjylland, established in 2007 and later renamed Ultras Midtjylland. In 2014, Midtjylland got its second unofficial faction, a youth faction called Midtjylland Ungdom. As of today, there are three unofficial factions: Zartow, Chaos Crew, and Midtjylland Ungdom. Collectively, all FC Midtjylland supporters go under the name of Hedens Drenge.

Hedens Drenge is currently Midtjylland's largest fan-based social media account, with a following of around 11,000 on Instagram and Facebook combined.

The club's main rival is Viborg FF. This rivalry is often referred to as The Battle of the Heath, The Battle of Hatred, and The Derby of Midtjylland. The derby is claimed to be the second biggest in Denmark behind that of FC København and Brøndby IF.

== Seasons ==
Performance graph of Football Club Midtjylland

Season	League	Pos.	Pl.	W	D	L	GS	GA	P	Cup	Europe
1999–00	1D	1	30	24	4	2	78	17	76	Fifth round	
2000–01	SL	4	33	14	11	8	54	43	53	Semi-finals	
2001–02	SL	3	33	16	9	8	47	27	57	Fifth round	UEFA Cup First Round
2002–03	SL	7	33	11	11	11	49	45	44	Finalist	UEFA Cup Second Round
2003–04	SL	6	33	14	6	13	65	51	48	Fourth round	
2004–05	SL	3	33	17	6	10	49	40	57	Finalist	
2005–06	SL	7	33	10	11	12	42	52	41	Fifth round	UEFA Cup First Round
2006–07	SL	2	33	18	9	6	58	39	63	Quarter-finals	
2007–08	SL	2	33	18	8	7	53	36	62	Semi-finals	UEFA Cup First Round
2008–09	SL	4	33	16	7	10	55	46	55	Third round	
2009–10	SL	6	33	14	5	14	41	41	47	Finalist	
2010–11	SL	4	33	13	10	10	50	42	49	Finalist	
2011–12	SL	3	33	17	7	9	50	40	58	Fourth round	UEFA Europa League Third Qualifying Round
2012–13	SL	6	33	12	11	10	51	47	47	Quarter-finals	UEFA Europa League Playoff Round
2013–14	SL	3	33	16	7	10	61	38	55	Fourth round	
2014–15	SL	1	33	22	5	6	64	34	71	Fourth round	UEFA Europa League Playoff Round
2015–16	SL	3	33	17	8	8	57	33	59	Fourth round	UEFA Champions League Third Qualifying Round; UEFA Europa League Round of 32
2016–17	SL	4	36	15	9	12	67	53	54	Semi-finals	UEFA Europa League Playoff Round
2017–18	SL	1	36	27	4	5	80	39	85	Semi-finals	UEFA Europa League Playoff Round
2018–19	SL	2	36	21	8	7	76	43	71	Champion	UEFA Champions League Second Qualifying Round; UEFA Europa League Playoff Round
2019–20	SL	1	36	26	4	6	61	29	82	Third round	UEFA Europa League Third Qualifying Round
2020–21	SL	2	32	18	6	8	57	33	60	Semi-finals	UEFA Champions League Group Stage
2021–22	SL	2	32	20	5	7	59	33	65	Champion	UEFA Champions League Second Qualifying Round; UEFA Europa League Group Stage; UEFA Europa Conference League Knockout Round
2022–23	SL	7	32	13	12	7	55	39	51	Fourth round	UEFA Champions League Third Qualifying Round; UEFA Europa League Group Stage & Knockout Round
2023–24	SL	1	32	19	6	7	62	43	63	Fourth round	UEFA Europa Conference League Playoff Round
2024–25	SL	2	32	19	5	8	64	42	62	Fourth round	UEFA Europa League Group Stage & Knockout Round

== Honours ==
- Danish Superliga
  - Winners (4): 2014–15, 2017–18, 2019–20, 2023–24
  - Runners-up (7): 2006–07, 2007–08, 2018–19, 2020–21, 2021–22, 2024–25, 2025–26
- 1st Division
  - Winners (1): 1999–2000
- Danish Cup
  - Winners (3): 2018–19, 2021–22, 2025–26
  - Runners-up (4): 2002–03, 2004–05, 2009–10, 2010–11

== Players ==
=== Current squad ===
As of 29 September 2026

Note: Flags indicate national team as defined under FIFA eligibility rules; some limited exceptions apply. Players may hold more than one non-FIFA nationality.

No.	Pos.	Nation	Player
1	GK	ISL	Elías Ólafsson
2	DF	DEN	Andreas Maxsø
3	DF	DEN	Magnus Jensen
4	DF	SEN	Ousmane Diao
5	DF	DEN	Rasmus Kristensen (captain)
6	DF	CRO	Martin Erlić
8	MF	DEN	Philip Billing
9	FW	DEN	Mileta Rajović (on loan from Legia Warsaw)
10	FW	KOR	Cho Gue-sung
15	DF	CIV	Djé Beni
17	FW	DEN	Mikael Uhre
18	FW	NGR	Stanley Iheanacho
19	MF	COL	Pedro Bravo
20	MF	KOR	Hong Hyun-seok (on loan from Mainz 05)
21	MF	ECU	Denil Castillo

No.	Pos.	Nation	Player
22	DF	DEN	Mads Bech Sørensen
25	GK	NED	Nordin Bakker
27	MF	DEN	Sofus Johannesen
29	MF	GER	Kjell Wätjen
30	GK	ENG	Ovie Ejeheri
33	MF	GBS	Alamara Djabi
34	DF	SEN	Abdou Aziz Ndiaye
38	FW	DEN	Julius Emefile
41	FW	DEN	Mikel Gogorza
55	DF	DEN	Victor Bak
60	GK	NGR	Mark Ugboh
74	FW	BRA	Júnior Brumado
90	FW	NGR	Friday Etim
98	FW	VEN	David Martínez

=== Out on loan ===
Note: Flags indicate national team as defined under FIFA eligibility rules; some limited exceptions apply. Players may hold more than one non-FIFA nationality.

No.	Pos.	Nation	Player
11	FW	CHI	Darío Osorio (at Crystal Palace until 30 June 2027)
14	FW	ZAM	Edward Chilufya (at Hapoel Jerusalem until 30 June 2027)
24	MF	DEN	Jonathan Lindekilde (at Fredericia until 30 June 2027)
31	GK	SWE	Liam Selin (at Värnamo until 31 December 2026)
35	DF	SWE	Bilal Konteh (at Vendsyssel until 30 June 2027)
80	MF	POR	Dani Silva (at Widzew Łódź until 30 June 2027)

No.	Pos.	Nation	Player
—	DF	DEN	Albert Lodberg (at Hillerød until 30 June 2027)
—	MF	DEN	Frederik Bunten (at Fredericia until 30 June 2027)
—	DF	DEN	Mathis Konradsen (at Nykøbing until 30 June 2027)
—	MF	CIV	Yacouba Ouattara (at Kolding until 30 June 2027)
—	MF	SEN	Papa Thome (at Kolding IF until 30 June 2027)
—	FW	CIV	Deme Jr. (at Mafra until 30 June 2027)

=== Youth team ===
See: FC Midtjylland Academy

=== Notable players ===
1990s

- (Denmark) Søren Skriver (1994–2004)
- (Denmark) Frank Kristensen (1997–2011, 2013–2014)
- (Denmark) Peter Skov-Jensen (1999–2005)

2000s

- (Egypt) Mohamed Zidan (2003–2005)
- (United States) Danny Califf (2008–2009)
- (Denmark) Mads Albæk (2004–2013)
- (Croatia) Kristijan Ipša (2008–2013)
- (New Zealand) Winston Reid (2005–2010)
- (Denmark) Mikkel Thygesen (2004–2007, 2007–2011)
- (Denmark) Jonas Lössl (2008–2014, 2021–)
- (Denmark) Simon Kjær (2007–2008)

2010s

- (Sweden) Petter Andersson (2012–2016)
- (Netherlands) Rafael van der Vaart (2016–2018)
- (Nigeria) Sylvester Igboun (2010–2015)
- (Nigeria) Paul Onuachu (2013–2019)
- (Nigeria) Frank Onyeka (2018–2021)
- (Norway) Alexander Sørloth (2017–2018)
- (Denmark) Jakob Poulsen (2010–2012, 2014–2019)
- (Denmark) Rasmus Nissen Kristensen (2012–2018)
- (Denmark) Morten "Duncan" Rasmussen (2012–2016)
- (Denmark) Pione Sisto (2013–2016, 2020–2023)
- (Finland) Tim Sparv (2014–2020)
- (Ukraine) Artem Dovbyk (2018–2020)

2020s

- (Brazil) Evander (2019–2022)
- (Nigeria) Raphael Onyedika (2020–2022)
- (Denmark) Anders Dreyer (2020–2021, 2022)
- (Brazil) Vagner Love (2022)
- (Egypt) Emam Ashour (2023)

== Personnel ==
=== Current technical staff ===
Role	Name
Head coach	(Denmark) Mike Tullberg
Assistant coach	(Denmark) Morten Rasmussen
Goalkeeping coach	(Denmark) Lasse Heinze
Chief Analyst	(Denmark) Sören Bjerg
Opponent Analyst	(Denmark) Oliver Heil
Sports Scientist	(Finland) Niklas Virtanen

=== Management ===
Role	Name
Director of Football	(Denmark) Svend Graversen
Director of Football	(Denmark) Svend Graversen
Director and Head of Development	(England) Judan Ali
Head of academy coaching	(Denmark) Rene S. Andersen

== Coaches ==
- (Denmark) Ove Pedersen (1 July 1999 – 30 June 2002)
- (Denmark) Troels Bech (1 July 2002 – 31 December 2003)
- (Denmark) Erik Rasmussen (1 Jan 2004 – 30 June 2008)
- (Denmark) Thomas Thomasberg (1 July 2008 – 11 August 2009)
- (Denmark) Allan Kuhn (12 Aug 2009 – 15 April 2011)
- (Denmark) Glen Riddersholm (16 April 2011– 25 June 2015)
- (Denmark) Jess Thorup (12 July 2015 – 10 October 2018)
- (Denmark) Kenneth Andersen (10 October 2018 – 19 August 2019)
- (Denmark) Brian Priske (19 August 2019 – 29 May 2021)
- (Denmark) Bo Henriksen (31 May 2021 – 28 July 2022)
- (Denmark) Henrik Jensen (28 July 2022 – 24 August 2022)
- (Spain) Albert Capellas (24 August 2022 – 13 March 2023)
- (Denmark) Thomas Thomasberg (23 March 2023 – 31 August 2025)
- (Denmark) Mike Tullberg (2 September 2025 – present)

== Midtjylland in European competitions ==
FC Midtjylland's first competitive European match was on 9 August 2001 in the 2001–02 UEFA Cup, playing Northern Ireland's Glentoran to a 1–1 draw in the first leg of the Qualifying Round before ultimately advancing to the First Round where they were eliminated by Sporting CP. In 2016 Midtjylland reached the Round of 32 of the 2015–16 UEFA Europa League, where they achieved a 2–1 home victory over Manchester United but would end up losing 6–3 on aggregate following the second leg.

=== UEFA club coefficient ranking ===
As of 8 November 2024

Rank	Team	Points
64	(Czech Republic) Sparta Prague	29.500
65	(England) Aston Villa	29.000
66	(Denmark) Midtjylland	28.500
67	(Norway) Molde	28.500
68	(Germany) SC Freiburg	28.000

== See also ==
- FC Midtjylland (women) (women's team)
