= 2021–22 FC Midtjylland season =

FC Midtjylland
2021–22 season
- Owner: Matthew Benham
- Chairman: Rasmus Ankersen
- Manager: Bo Henriksen
- Stadium: MCH Arena
- Superliga: 2nd
- Danish Cup: Winners
- UEFA Champions League: Third qualifying round
- UEFA Europa League: Group stage
- UEFA Europa Conference League: Knockout round
- Top goalscorer: League: Evander (12); All: Evander (16)
Home colours	Away colours	Third colours

The 2021–22 season was FC Midtjylland's 23rd season of existence, and their 21st consecutive season in the Danish Superliga, the top tier of football in Denmark. As a result of the club's runner-up finish in 2020–21, it competed in the 2021–22 UEFA Champions League, and subsequently in the 2021–22 UEFA Europa League and the 2021-22 UEFA Europa Conference League. The Black Wolves completed a successful 2021–22 campaign with a second-place finish in the Superliga, again qualifying for the Champions League, and also captured its second Danish Cup, after defeating OB in the final on penalties.

== Squad ==
As of 16 March 2022

No.	Name	Nat	Position	Since	Date of birth	Signed from
Goalkeepers
16	Elías Rafn Ólafsson	(Iceland)	GK	2020	11 March 2000	(Denmark) FC Midtjylland U19
31	David Ousted	(Denmark)	GK	2022	1 February 1985	Retired
30	Jared Thompson	(Northern Ireland) (England)	GK	2021	23 February 1999	(England) Brentford F.C. B
90	Valdemar Birksø	(Denmark)	GK	2021	17 March 2001	(Denmark) Homegrown
Defenders
5	Daniel Høegh	(Denmark)	DF	2020	6 January 1991	(Netherlands) SC Heerenveen
6	Joel Andersson	(Sweden)	DF	2018	11 November 1996	(Sweden) BK Häcken
14	Henrik Dalsgaard	(Denmark)	DF	2021	27 July 1989	(England) Brentford F.C.
17	Mads Døhr Thychosen	(Denmark)	DF	2022	27 June 1997	(Denmark) FC Nordsjælland
26	Pablo Ortiz	(Colombia)	DF	2022	7 January 1998	(Colombia) América de Cali
28	Erik Sviatchenko	(Denmark)	DF	2018	4 October 1991	(Scotland) Celtic F.C.
29	Paulinho	(Brazil)	DF	2019	3 January 1995	(Brazil) Bahia
44	Nikolas Dyhr	(Denmark)	DF	2019	18 June 2001	(Denmark) Homegrown
50	Hosine Bility	(Australia)	DF	2021	10 May 2001	(Denmark) Homegrown
55	Viktor Bak	(Denmark)	DF	2021	3 October 2003	(Denmark) Homegrown
73	Juninho	(Brazil)	DF	2021	1 February 1995	(Brazil) Esporte Clube Bahia
Midfielders
7	Pione Sisto	(Denmark) (South Sudan)	MF	2020	4 February 1995	(Spain) Celta de Vigo
8	Max Meyer	(Germany)	MF	2022	18 September 1995	(Turkey) Fenerbahçe
10	Evander	(Brazil)	MF	2018	9 June 1998	(Brazil) CR Vasco da Gama
11	Awer Mabil	(Australia) (South Sudan)	MF	2015	15 September 1995	(Australia) Adelaide United FC
15	Bozhidar Kraev	(Bulgaria)	MF	2017	23 June 1997	(Hungary) PFC Levski Sofia
18	Edward Chilufya	(Zambia)	MF	2022	17 September 1999	(Sweden) Djurgårdens IF
24	Oliver Sørensen	(Denmark)	MF	2021	10 March 2002	(Denmark) Homegrown
29	Anders Dreyer	(Denmark)	MF	2022	2 May 1998	(Russia) FC Rubin Kazan
35	Charles	(Brazil)	MF	2021	19 June 1996	(Brazil) Ceará
37	Raphael Onyedika	(Nigeria)	MF	2021	19 April 2001	(Denmark) Homegrown
45	Gustav Isaksen	(Denmark)	MF	2019	19 April 2001	(Denmark) Homegrown
54	Oscar Fraulo	(Denmark) (Italy)	MF	2021	6 December 2003	(Denmark) Homegrown
Forwards
19	Vágner Love	(Brazil)	FW	2022	11 June 1984	(Kazakhstan) FC Kairat
38	Marrony	(Brazil)	FW	2021	5 February 1999	(Brazil) Clube Atlético Mineiro
47	Frederik Heiselberg	(Denmark)	FW	2021	11 February 2003	(Denmark) Homegrown
48	Mads Hansen	(Denmark)	FW	2021	28 July 2002	(Denmark) Homegrown
53	Victor Lind	(Denmark)	FW	2021	12 July 2003	(Denmark) Homegrown
58	Aral Şimşir	(Denmark) (Turkey)	FW	2021	19 June 2002	(Denmark) Homegrown
74	Júnior Brumado	(Brazil)	FW	2019	15 May 1999	(Brazil) EC Bahia

=== Out on loan ===
Note: Flags indicate national team as defined under FIFA eligibility rules; some limited exceptions apply. Players may hold more than one non-FIFA nationality.

No.	Pos.	Nation	Player
—	GK	DEN	Jonas Lössl (at Brentford until 30 June 2022)
—	DF	DEN	Tobias Anker (at Fredericia until 30 June 2022)
—	DF	DEN	Oliver Olsen (at Fredericia until 30 June 2022)
—	MF	DEN	Christian Tue Jensen (at Fredericia until 30 June 2022)
—	MF	DEN	Nicolas Madsen (at SC Heerenveen until 30 June 2022)

No.	Pos.	Nation	Player
—	MF	DEN	Victor Torp (at Kortrijk until 30 June 2022)
—	DF	MAS	Dion Cools (at Zulte Waregem until 30 June 2022)
—	FW	GUI	Sory Kaba (at OH Leuven until 30 June 2022)
—	FW	GER	Luca Pfeiffer (at Darmstadt until 30 June 2022)

== Non-competitive ==
=== Pre-season friendlies ===
27 June 2021	Malmö FF (Sweden)	1–2	(Denmark) Midtjylland	Malmö
14:00 CEST				Stadium: Eleda Stadion

7 July 2021	Lech Poznań (Poland)	3–2	(Denmark) Midtjylland	Poznań, Poland
14:00 CEST	Ishak 30' (pen.); Own goal 74'; Marchwiński 80'		Høegh 61' (Sviatchenko); Nicolaisen 87'	Stadium: Stadion Poznań

10 July 2021	SK Sigma Olomouc (Czech Republic)	1–2	(Denmark) Midtjylland	Opalenica, Poland
14:00 CEST	Daněk 42'	FCM Report	Evander 7'; Brumado 22'	Stadium: Stadion Miejski

=== Mid-season friendlies ===
21 January 2022	Midtjylland	5–1	Esbjerg fB	Herning
13:00 CET	Nibe 7'; Hansen 9' (Mabil); Mabil 31' (Ólafsson); Sørensen 65' (Sisto); Andreasen 83' (Sisto)	FCM Report	Kristensen 53'	Stadium: Herning Fremad

28 January 2022	Hamburger SV (Germany)	1–5	Midtjylland	Hamburg, Germany
11:00 CET				Stadium: HSV's Anlæg

=== Atlantic Cup ===
3 February 2022	FC Zenit (Russia)	1–0	Midtjylland	São João da Venda, Algarve, Portugal
15:00 GMT	Alip 40'	Atlantic Cup Report		Stadium: Estádio Algarve

6 February 2022	Midtjylland	3–3 (a.e.t.) (4–5 p)	(Iceland) Breiðablik UBK	Parchal, Portugal
19:30 GMT	Marrony 10'; Lind 17', 32'	Atlantic Cup Report	Vilhjálmsson 53'; Eyjólfsson 82'; Warén 87'	Stadium: Estádio Municipal Bela Vista
	Penalties
	(penalty scored) Paulinho; (penalty scored) Love; (penalty missed) Bonnén; (penalty scored) Sørensen; (penalty scored) Isaksen		Gunnlaugsson (penalty scored); Vilhjálmsson (penalty scored); Eyjólfsson (penalty scored); Einarsson (penalty scored); Muminovic (penalty scored)

11 February 2022	Midtjylland	3–1	(Norway) Vålerenga	Portugal
18:30 GMT	Onyedika 14'; Sisto 48'; Andersson 57'	Atlantic Cup Report	Kjartansson 10'	Stadium: Estádio Municipal de Albufeira

== Competitive ==
=== Competition record ===
Competition	Record							
Competition	G	W	D	L	GF	GA	GD	Win %
Danish Superliga	32	20	5	7	59	33	+26	62.50
Danish Cup	7	5	1	1	15	4	+11	71.43
UEFA Champions League	4	1	1	2	3	6	−3	25.00
UEFA Europa League	6	2	3	1	7	7	+0	33.33
UEFA Europa Conference League	2	1	0	1	2	2	+0	50.00
Total	51	29	10	12	86	52	+34	56.86

Last updated: Season Complete.
Source: Competitive matches

=== Danish Superliga ===
==== Regular season ====
Pos	Team	Pld	W	D	L	GF	GA	GD	Pts	Qualification
1	Copenhagen	22	14	6	2	43	13	+30	48	Qualification for the Championship round
2	Midtjylland	22	13	3	6	37	22	+15	42	Qualification for the Championship round
3	Brøndby	22	11	7	4	30	24	+6	40	Qualification for the Championship round
4	AaB	22	11	5	6	36	26	+10	38	Qualification for the Championship round
5	Randers	22	9	6	7	26	25	+1	33	Qualification for the Championship round

Source: Danish Football Association (in Danish), Soccerway
Rules for classification: 1) Points; 2) Goal difference; 3) Goals scored; 4) Away goals scored; 5) Play-off (played on neutral ground if determining teams for different rounds); 6) Draw.

==== Results by round – Regular season ====
Matchday	1	2	3	4	5	6	7	8	9	10	11	12	13	14	15	16	17	18	19	20	21	22
Ground	H	A	A	H	A	H	A	H	A	H	H	A	H	A	A	H	A	H	A	H	H	A
Result	L	W	W	W	W	W	L	W	W	W	W	D	W	W	L	L	D	L	D	W	L	W
Position	10	5	2	2	2	1	2	2	1	1	1	1	1	1	1	1	1	2	2	2	3	2

Updated to match(es) played on 20 March 2022. Source: http://www.superliga.dk/
A = Away; H = Home; W = Win; D = Draw; L = Loss

==== Championship round ====
Pos	Team	Pld	W	D	L	GF	GA	GD	Pts	Qualification	COP	MID	SIL	BRO	AAB	RAN
1	Copenhagen (C)	32	20	8	4	56	19	+37	68	Qualification for the Champions League play-off round	—	1–0	2–1	2–0	3–0	0–1
2	Midtjylland	32	20	5	7	59	33	+26	65	Qualification for the Champions League second qualifying round	0–0	—	3–2	2–2	2–0	3–2
3	Silkeborg	32	13	10	9	54	37	+17	49	Qualification for the Europa League play-off round	3–1	1–4	—	3–0	4–2	1–0
4	Brøndby	32	13	9	10	40	41	−1	48	Qualification for the Europa Conference League second qualifying round	1–1	1–3	2–1	—	0–1	0–1
5	AaB	32	13	6	13	47	45	+2	45	Qualification for the European play-off match	0–1	1–2	1–2	1–3	—	3–0

Source: Danish Football Association (in Danish), Soccerway
Legend: Blue = home team win; Yellow = draw; Red = away team win.
Rules for classification: 1) Points; 2) Goal difference; 3) Goals scored; 4) Away goals scored; 5) Play-off (played on neutral ground if determining teams for different rounds); 6) Draw.
(C) Champions

==== Results by round – Championship round ====
Matchday	1	2	3	4	5	6	7	8	9	10
Ground	H	A	A	H	A	H	A	H	A	H
Result	W	L	W	W	W	D	W	D	W	W
Position	2	2	2	2	2	2	2	2	2	2

Source: http://www.superliga.dk/
A = Away; H = Home; W = Win; D = Draw; L = Loss

==== Regular season ====
16 July 2021 1	Midtjylland	1–2	OB	Herning
19:00 CEST	Sisto 59' (Dreyer)	FCM Summary	Kadrii 15'; Andersen (yellow card) 51'; Sabbi (yellow card) 54'; Larsen (yellow card) 61'; Skjelvik 90+1'	Stadium: MCH Arena; Attendance: 4,890; Referee: Sandi Putros

24 July 2021 2	AaB	0–1	Midtjylland	Aalborg
18:00 CEST	Pallesen (yellow card) 59'	FCM Summary	Brumado; Sisto (yellow card) 59'	Stadium: Aalborg Portland Park; Attendance: 3,784; Referee: Jakob Kehlet

31 July 2021 3	Viborg FF	0–2	Midtjylland	Viborg
16:00 CEST	J. Grønning (yellow card) 24'	FCM Summary	Paulinho (yellow card) 14'; Evander 71'; Høegh (yellow card) 74'; Dreyer 77'	Stadium: Viborg Stadion; Referee: Anders Poulsen

6 August 2021 4	Midtjylland	4–1	Vejle	Herning
20:30 CEST	Nicolaisen (yellow card) 25'; Isaksen 35' (Andersson); Sviatchenko 57' (Dreyer); Dreyer 75' (Mabil); Mabil 80' (Dreyer) (yellow card) 81'	FCM Summary	Schoop (yellow card) 19'; Muçolli (yellow card) 36'; Ezatolahi (yellow card) 41'; Kolinger 51' (Emmanouilidis) (yellow card) 87'	Stadium: MCH Arena; Referee: Mikkel Redder

13 August 2021 5	SønderjyskE	0–2	Midtjylland	Haderslev
20:00 CEST	Albæk (yellow card) 26'; Gartenmann (yellow card) 26'	FCM Summary	Brumado 4' (Dreyer) (red card) 30'; Andersson (yellow card) 41'; Lind 88' (Mabil)	Stadium: Sydbank Park; Referee: Morten Krogh

20 August 2021 6	Midtjylland	3–0	Silkeborg IF	Herning
19:00 CEST	Evander 5' (pen.); Sisto 45+1' (Dreyer); Dreyer 62' (Isaksen)	FCM Summary	Dahl (yellow card) 4'; Calisir (yellow card) 17'	Stadium: MCH Arena; Referee: Mads-Kristoffer Kristoffersen

29 August 2021 7	Brøndby	2–0	Midtjylland	Brøndbyvester
20:00 CEST	Ben Slimane 54' (Bruus); Uhre 66'	FCM Summary	Sviatchenko (yellow card) 49'; Charles (yellow card) 90+1'	Stadium: Brøndby Stadium; Attendance: 13,777; Referee: Sandi Putros

10 September 2021 8	Midtjylland	2–0	FC Nordsjælland	Herning
19:00 CEST	Isaksen 47' (Brumado); Lind 77' (Olafsson); Sviatchenko (yellow card) 89'	FCM Summary	Diomande (yellow card) 15'; Francis (yellow card) 87'	Stadium: MCH Arena; Referee: Mikkel Redder

19 September 2021 9	Copenhagen	0–1	Midtjylland	Copenhagen
18:00 CEST	Boilesen (yellow card) 13'; Stage (yellow card) 61'; Khocholava (yellow card) 84'	FCM Summary	Evander (red card) 27'; Brumado 47'; Ólafsson (yellow card) 90+4'	Stadium: Telia Parken; Attendance: 34,378; Referee: Jakob Kehlet

26 September 2021 10	Midtjylland	1–0	Randers FC	Herning
19:00 CEST	Sviatchenko 17' (Sisto); Brumado (yellow card) 65'; Onyedika (yellow card) 82'	FCM Summary	Kehinde (yellow card) 26'; Lauenborg (yellow card) 31'; Tibbling (yellow card) 45'	Stadium: MCH Arena; Attendance: 8,500; Referee: Jorgen Daugbjerg Burchardt

3 October 2021 11	Midtjylland	4–0	AGF	Herning
16:00 CEST	Brumado 4' (Andersson) 19' (pen.) 31' (Isaksen); Paulinho 27' (Sisto) (yellow card) 64'	FCM Summary	Hausner (yellow card) 18'	Stadium: MCH Arena; Attendance: 11,432; Referee: Sandi Putros

17 October 2021 12	FC Nordsjælland	2–2	Midtjylland	Farum
13:00 CEST	Adingra 14' (Coulibaly); Thychosen 28' (Adingra); Woledzi (yellow card) 80'	FCM Summary	Brumado (yellow card) 44' (goal) 48' (Evander); Lind 62' (Andersson); Onyedika (yellow card) 77'	Stadium: Right to Dream Park; Referee: Jens Maae

24 October 2021 13	Midtjylland	3–2	SønderjyskE	Herning
18:00 CEST	Evander 42' (Isaksen); Sviatchenko 54' (Sisto); Hansen 90+5' (Mabil)	FCM Summary	Holm 6' (Albæk); Ekani (yellow card) 67'; Frederiksen 90+1' (Simonsen)	Stadium: MCH Arena; Referee: Jakob Kehlet

31 October 2021 14	Randers FC	1–3	Midtjylland	Randers
15:00 CEST	Odey (yellow card) 26' (goal) 53'; Johnsen (yellow card) 70'; Piesinger (yellow card) 77'	FCM Summary	Onyedika 14' (Andersson) 39' (Andersson); Sisto (yellow card) 26'; Lind (yellow card) 44'; Dalsgaard (yellow card) 51'; Paulinho (yellow card) 61'; Evander 64' (Onyedika)	Stadium: Cepheus Park Randers; Referee: Jakob A. Sundberg

7 November 2021 15	AGF	3–0	Midtjylland	Aarhus
20:00 CEST	Mortensen 16' (Brandhof); Anderson 23' (yellow card) 40'; Lund (yellow card) 29'; Bundu 41'	FCM Summary	Onyedika (yellow card) 27'; Paulinho (yellow card) 57'; Evander (yellow card) 89'	Stadium: Ceres Park; Referee: Sandi Putros

21 November 2021 16	Midtjylland	1–2	Brøndby IF	Herning
18:00 CEST	Evander 13' (pen.); Brumado (yellow card) 56'; Marrony (yellow card) 90+5'	FCM Summary	Uhre 36' 41' (Hedlund); Bruus (yellow card) 49'	Stadium: MCH Arena; Referee: Morten Krogh

29 November 2021 17	Vejle	1–1	Midtjylland	Vejle
19:00 CEST	Kolinger (yellow card) 32'; Đorđević 90+4' (Hansson) (yellow card) 90+5'	FCM Summary	Sisto (yellow card) 32'; Sviatchenko 57' (Evander); Juninho (yellow card) 66'; Dyhr (yellow card) 90+3'	Stadium: Vejle Stadium; Referee: Mads-Kristoffer Kristoffersen

20 February 2022 18	Midtjylland	0–2	AaB	Herning
14:00 CET	Sviatchenko (yellow card) 6'; Charles (yellow card) 27'; Fraulo (yellow card) 90'	FCM Summary	Pallesen (yellow card) 12'; Granli 28' (Prip); Højholt (yellow card) 33'; Høgh 56'; Hagelskjær (yellow card) 90+4'	Stadium: MCH Arena; Attendance: 9,004; Referee: Morten Krogh

27 February 2022 19	OB	2–2	Midtjylland	Odense
18:00 CET	Tverskov (yellow card) 29'; King (yellow card) 55'; Jebali 59' (Mickelson) (yellow card) 90+2'; Sviatchenko 62' (o.g.); Okosun (yellow card) 77'	FCM Summary	Brumado 52' (Dyhr); Love	Stadium: Nature Energy Park; Attendance: 8,792; Referee: Jorgen Daugbjerg Burchardt

4 March 2022 20	Midtjylland	3–1	Viborg FF	Herning
18:00 CET	Dyhr 12' (Andersson); Evander 21' 25' (Andersson); Charles (yellow card) 28'	FCM Summary	Grønning (yellow card) 15'; Bonde (yellow card) 27'; Lonwijk (yellow card) 34'; Lauritsen (yellow card) 37' (yellow-red card) 73'; Grot 45' (Bakiz); Bakiz (yellow card) 79'	Stadium: MCH Arena; Referee: Jens Maae

13 March 2022 21	Midtjylland	0–1	Copenhagen	Herning
18:00 CEST	Brumado (yellow card) 9'; Evander (yellow card) 42'; Dalsgaard (yellow card) 74'	FCM Summary	Lerager (yellow card) 71'; Babacar (yellow card) 86' (goal) 90+5'	Stadium: MCH Arena; Attendance: 11,288; Referee: Mads-Kristoffer Kristoffersen

20 March 2022 22	Silkeborg IF	1–2	Midtjylland	Silkeborg
14:20 CET	Þórðarson (yellow card) 58'; Carstensen (yellow card) 74'; Vallys (yellow card) 90+5'	FCM Summary	Dalsgaard 90+3'	Stadium: JYSK Park; Referee: Sandi Putros

==== Championship round ====
4 April 2022 23	Midtjylland	3–2	Silkeborg	Herning
19:00 CEST	Brumado (yellow card) 45+3'; Isaksen 47' (Chilufya); Chilufya 62' (Dyhr); Høegh (yellow card) 69'; Evander 75' (Isaksen)	FCM Summary	Helenius 17' (Gojani) 90+4' (Carstensen)	Stadium: MCH Arena; Referee: Jonas Hansen

10 April 2022 24	Copenhagen	1–0	Midtjylland	Copenhagen
18:00 CET	Vavro (yellow card) 18'; Lerager 63' (Diks); Falk (yellow card) 83'	FCM Summary	Onyedika (yellow card) 46'; Ousted (yellow card) 71'; Paulinho (yellow card) 85'	Stadium: Parken Stadium; Attendance: 28,321; Referee: Jakob A. Sundberg

13 April 2022 25	Randers	1–3	Midtjylland	Randers
18:30 CET	Kopplin (yellow card) 77'; Kehinde 90+2' (Kopplin)	FCM Summary	Charles 17' (Dalsgaard); Dalsgaard 45'; Dreyer 82' (Evander)	Stadium: Cepheus Park; Attendance: 6,334; Referee: Morten Krogh

18 April 2022 26	Midtjylland	2–0	AaB	Herning
18:00 CET	Evander 38' (pen.); Dreyer 42'; Thychosen (yellow card) 54'; Onyedika (yellow card) 90+3'	FCM Summary	Ross (yellow card) 37' (yellow-red card) 59'	Stadium: MCH Arena; Attendance: 8,836; Referee: Jorgen Daugbjerg Burchardt

25 April 2022 27	Brøndby	1–3	Midtjylland	Brøndbyvester
19:00 CET	Maxsø (red card) 8'; Hedlund 24' (pen.) (yellow card) 68'; Rosted (yellow card) 38'	FCM Summary	Høegh (yellow card) 23'; Evander 40' (pen.); Isaksen 43' (Dreyer); Brumado (yellow card) 65'; Dreyer 70' (Onyedika)	Stadium: Brøndby Stadium; Attendance: 15,575; Referee: Jakob Kehlet

1 May 2022 29	Midtjylland	0–0	Copenhagen	Herning
18:00 CET	Andersson (yellow card) 37'; Sviatchenko (yellow card) 76'; Onyedika (yellow card) 78'	FCM Summary	Ankersen (yellow card) 66'; Babacar (yellow card) 87'	Stadium: MCH Arena; Attendance: 11,289; Referee: Morten Krogh

8 May 2022 29	AaB	1–2	Midtjylland	Aalborg
18:00 CET	Makarić (yellow card) 61'; Ross (yellow card) 61'; Hagelskjær (yellow card) 62'; Fossum 66'; Højholt (yellow card) 86'; Høgh (yellow card) 90+3'	FCM Summary	Chilufya 2' (Isaksen); Andersson 10' (Dreyer); Onyedika (yellow card) 61'; Charles (yellow card) 75'; Dalsgaard (yellow card) 90+3'	Stadium: Aalborg Portland Park; Attendance: 8,478; Referee: Peter Kjærsgaard-Andersen

12 May 2022 30	Midtjylland	2–2	Brøndby	Herning
20:00 CET	Evander 79'; Dreyer 82'	FCM Summary	Cappis 14' (Hedlund); Maxsø (yellow card) 52'; Ben Slimane (yellow card) 85'; Bruus 90+5'	Stadium: MCH Arena; Attendance: 10,201; Referee: Jakob A. Sundberg

16 May 2022 31	Silkeborg IF	1–4	Midtjylland	Silkeborg
19:00 CET	Klynge 90+3' (Tengstedt)	FCM Summary	Chilufya 7' (Dreyer); Thychosen 47' (Evander) 53' (Chilufya); Juninho 87' (Evander)	Stadium: JYSK Park; Attendance: 8,410; Referee: Michael Tykgaard

22 May 2022 32	Midtjylland	3–2	Randers	Herning
20:00 CET	Isaksen 8' (Evander); Dreyer 37' (Chilufya); Evander 80'	FCM Summary	Kehinde 42' (Ankersen); Kopplin (yellow card) 45'; Dalsgaard 72' (o.g.); Piesinger (yellow card) 79'	Stadium: MCH Arena; Attendance: 8,461; Referee: Jakob Kehlet

=== Danish Cup ===
22 September 2021 Third round	Kjellerup IF	0–5	Midtjylland	Kjellerup, Central Jutland
16:30 CEST		FCM Summary	Evander 30'; Mabil 34' (Evander); Lind 59' 79' (Mabil); Şimşir 65'	Stadium: XL-byg Arena; Referee: Mads-Kristoffer Kristoffersen

28 October 2021 Fourth round	Midtjylland	3–1 (a.e.t.)	AaB	Herning
18:00 CEST	Sisto (yellow card) 45+3'; Andersson 56' (Sisto); Lössl (yellow card) 90+2'; Evander 102' (Sisto); Isaksen (yellow card) 111'	FCM Summary	Ross (yellow card) 45+3'; Højholt (yellow card) 45+4'; Prip 90+3'; Thelander (yellow card) 118'	Stadium: MCH Arena; Referee: Peter Kjærsgaard-Andersen

5 December 2021 Quarter-finals first leg	Brøndby IF	0–2	Midtjylland	Brøndbyvester
14:30 CET	Mensah (yellow card) 20'; Ben Slimane (yellow card) 27'	FCM Summary	Charles 22' (yellow card) 37'; Brumado 61' (Dyhr); Lind (yellow card) 88'	Stadium: Brøndby Stadium; Referee: Sandi Putros

12 December 2021 Quarter-finals second leg	Midtjylland	1–2 (3–2 agg.)	Brøndby IF	Herning
18:00 CET	Evander (yellow card) 17'; Onyedika 36' (Andersson); Lind (yellow card) 53'; Lössl (yellow card) 90+3'	FCM Summary	Maxsø (yellow card) 16'; Cappis (yellow card) 16'; Divković 28' (Mensah) (yellow card) 45' (goal) 73' (Riveros); Hedlund (yellow card) 89'	Stadium: MCH Arena; Referee: Jens Maae

27 April 2022 Semi-finals first leg	Vejle	0–1	Midtjylland	Vejle
TBD CEST	Ofori (yellow card) 45+2'; Kolinger (yellow card) 56'; Provstgaard (yellow card) 62'; Drammeh (yellow card) 80'; Albornoz (yellow card) 86'	FCM Summary	Høegh (yellow card) 29'; Dreyer 68' (Sisto); Thychosen (yellow card) 84'	Stadium: Vejle Stadium; Attendance: 6,000; Referee: Michael Tykgaard

4 May 2022 Semi-finals second leg	Midtjylland	3–1 (4–1 agg.)	Vejle	Herning
18:00 CEST	Brumado 42' (Meyer); Dreyer 73' (Andersson); Sviatchenko 80' (Andersson)	FCM Summary	Albentosa 22' (Muçolli); Emmanouilidis (yellow card) 49'; Okoku (yellow card) 60'	Stadium: MCH Arena; Referee: Jens Maae

26 May 2022 Final	OB	0–0 (a.e.t.) (3–4 p)	Midtjylland	Brøndby Stadium
15:00 UTC+2	Ivančević (yellow card) 48'	FCM Summary	Onyedika (yellow card) 67'; Thychosen (yellow card) 72'; Dreyer (yellow card) 105+3'	Attendance: 23,328; Referee: Sandi Putros
	Penalties
	Thomasen (penalty scored); Okosun (penalty missed); Jebali (penalty scored); Kadrii (penalty scored); Larsen (penalty missed)		(penalty scored) Dreyer; (penalty missed) Sviatchenko; (penalty scored) Sisto; (penalty scored) Onyedika; (penalty scored) Evander

=== UEFA Champions League ===
20 July 2021 Second qualifying round first leg	Celtic (Scotland)	1–1	(Denmark) Midtjylland	Glasgow, Scotland
20:45 CEST	Bitton (yellow card) 38' (yellow-red card) 44'; Abada 39'	FCM Summary	Dalsggard (yellow card) 26'; Dreyer (yellow card) 44' (yellow-red card) 56'; Evander 66'; Onyedika (yellow card) 81'	Stadium: Celtic Park; Attendance: 9,000; Referee: Sandro Schärer (Switzerland)

28 July 2021 Second qualifying round second leg	Midtjylland (Denmark)	2–1 (a.e.t) (3–1 agg.)	(Scotland) Celtic	Herning
19:45 CEST	Evander (yellow card) 53'; Mabil 61' (Sisto); Brumado (yellow card) 69'; Onyedika 94' (Dalsgaard); Sisto (yellow card) 115'	FCM Summary	Welsh (yellow card) 21'; McGregor 48'; Soro (yellow card) 76'; Édouard (yellow card) 93'; Ajeti (yellow card) 108'	Stadium: MCH Arena; Attendance: 9,000; Referee: Bartosz Frankowski (Poland)

3 August 2021 Third qualifying round first leg	PSV Eindhoven (Netherlands)	3–0	(Denmark) Midtjylland	Eindhoven, Netherlands
20:00 CEST	Madueke 19' (Zahavi); Götze 29' (Ramalho); Gakpo 32' (Zahavi)	FCM Summary	Onyedika (yellow card) 72'	Stadium: Philips Stadion; Attendance: 22,700; Referee: Sergei Karasev (Russia)

10 August 2021 Third qualifying round second leg	Midtjylland (Denmark)	0–1 (0–4 agg.)	PSV Eindhoven (Netherlands)	Herning
19:45 CEST		FCM Summary	Pröpper (yellow card) 61'; Bruma 90+3' (Júnior)	Stadium: MCH Arena; Attendance: 6,288; Referee: Clément Turpin (France)

=== UEFA Europa League ===
==== Group F ====
Pos	Team	Pld	W	D	L	GF	GA	GD	Pts	Qualification
1	(Serbia) Red Star Belgrade	6	3	2	1	6	4	+2	11	Advance to round of 16
2	(Portugal) Braga	6	3	1	2	12	9	+3	10	Advance to knockout round play-offs
3	(Denmark) Midtjylland	6	2	3	1	7	7	0	9	Transfer to Europa Conference League
4	(Bulgaria) Ludogorets Razgrad	6	0	2	4	3	8	−5	2	

Source: UEFA
Rules for classification: Group stage tiebreakers

16 September 2021 1	Midtjylland (Denmark)	1–1	(Bulgaria) Ludogorets Razgrad	Herning
18:45 CEST	Isaksen 3' (Evander); Onyedika (yellow card) 85'	FCM Summary	Despodov 32'; Badji (yellow card) 35'; Santana (yellow card) 45'; Cicinho (yellow card) 90+8'	Stadium: MCH Arena; Attendance: 6,568; Referee: Aliyar Aghayev (Azerbaijan)

30 September 2021 2	Braga (Portugal)	3–1	(Denmark) Midtjylland	Braga, Portugal
21:00 CEST	Leite (yellow card) 18'; Galeno 55' (pen.); Horta; Oliveira (yellow card) 89'	FCM Summary	Evander 19' (pen.) (yellow card) 80'; Sviatchenko (yellow card) 27'; Ólafsson (yellow card) 33'; Juninho (yellow card) 54' (yellow-red card) 84'	Stadium: Estádio Municipal de Braga; Referee: Stéphanie Frappart (France)

21 October 2021 3	Midtjylland (Denmark)	1–1	(Serbia) Red Star Belgrade	Herning
18:45 CEST	Cajuste (yellow card) 57'; Onyedika (yellow card) 67'; Dyhr 78'	FCM Summary	Srnić (yellow card) 39'; Ivanić 58' (Diony) (yellow card) 83'	Stadium: MCH Arena; Referee: Roi Reinshreiber (Israel)

4 November 2021 4	Red Star Belgrade (Serbia)	0–1	(Denmark) Midtjylland	Belgrade, Serbia
21:00 CEST	Katai (yellow card) 6'; Degenk (red card) 11'; Pavkov (yellow card) 38'; Ben (yellow card) 45'; Gobeljić (yellow card) 55' (yellow-red card) 90+4'	FCM Summary	Kanga 56' (o.g.); Charles (yellow card) 65'; Cajuste (yellow card) 75'	Stadium: Rajko Mitić Stadium; Referee: Tamás Bognár (Hungary)

25 November 2021 5	Midtjylland (Denmark)	3–2	(Portugal) Braga	Herning
18:45 CEST	Sviatchenko 2'; Isaksen 48' (Andersson) (yellow card) 52'; Onyedika (yellow card) 64'; Andersson (yellow card) 83'; Evander 90+2' (pen.) (yellow card) 90+3'	FCM Summary	Castro (yellow card) 21'; Horta 43' (Medeiros); Moura (yellow card) 80'; Galeno 85' (Moura) (yellow card) 86'	Stadium: MCH Arena; Referee: Matej Jug (Slovenia)

9 December 2021 6	Ludogorets Razgrad (Bulgaria)	0–0	(Denmark) Midtjylland	Razgrad, Bulgaria
21:00 CEST	Despodov (yellow card) 19'; Cicinho (yellow card) 24'	['https://www.fcm.dk/kampe/pfc-ludogorets-fc-midtjylland-09-12-2021/ FCM Summary]	Dyhr (yellow card) 28'; Paulinho (yellow card) 38'; Charles (yellow card) 74'	Stadium: Huvepharma Arena; Attendance: 556; Referee: Tobias Stieler (Germany)

=== UEFA Europa Conference League ===
17 February 2022 Knockout round play-offs first leg	Midtjylland (Denmark)	1–0	(Greece) PAOK	Herning
18:45 CET	Andersson 20' (Evander); Onyedika (yellow card) 73'	FCM Summary	Mitriță (yellow card) 36'; Schwab (yellow card) 41'; Crespo (yellow card) 90+4'	Stadium: MCH Arena; Attendance: 7,088; Referee: Craig Pawson (England)

24 February 2021 Knockout round play-offs second leg	PAOK (Greece)	2–1 (a.e.t.) (2–2 agg.) (5–3 p)	(Denmark) Midtjylland	Thessaloniki, Greece
21:00 CET	Živković 20' (Čolak); Crespo (yellow card) 23'; Vieirinha 26' (yellow card) 62'; Kurtić (yellow card) 56'; Lyratzis (yellow card) 90+1'	FCM Summary	Høegh 80' (Meyer); Onyedika (yellow card) 90+1'; Dyhr (yellow card) 101'	Stadium: Toumba Stadium; Referee: Lawrence Visser (Belgium)
	Penalties
	Čolak (penalty scored); Sidcley (penalty scored); Schwab (penalty scored); Mitriță (penalty scored); Kurtić (penalty scored)		(penalty missed) Meyer; (penalty scored) Andersson; (penalty scored) Dyhr; (penalty scored) Lind

== Statistics ==
=== Appearances ===
Includes all competitive matches.

Rnk	Pos	No.	Player	Superliga	Danish Cup	UEFA Champions League	UEFA Europa League	UEFA Europa Conference League	Total
1	DF	6	(Sweden) Joel Andersson	31	6	4	6	2	49
2	MF	37	(Nigeria) Raphael Onyedika	31	5	4	5	2	47
3	MF	10	(Brazil) Evander	29	5	4	6	2	46
4	FW	45	(Denmark) Gustav Isaksen	29	6	2	6	2	45
5	DF	14	(Denmark) Henrik Dalsgaard	28	6	2	6	1	43
6	DF	29	(Brazil) Paulinho	23	6	4	6	2	41
6	DF	28	(Denmark) Erik Sviatchenko	25	5	3	6	2	41
8	DF	44	(Denmark) Nikolas Dyhr	25	6	3	4	2	40
9	MF	7	(Denmark) Pione Sisto	24	5	2	6	2	39
10	MF	35	(Brazil) Charles	22	7	3	4	2	38
11	FW	74	(Brazil) Júnior Brumado	23	4	4	4	2	37
12	FW	53	(Denmark) Victor Lind	19	5	3	6	2	35
11	DF	73	(Brazil) Juninho	18	5	1	5	2	30
14	DF	5	(Denmark) Daniel Høegh	19	3	1	0	1	24
15	MF	36	(Denmark) Anders Dreyer	16	3	3	0	0	22
16	DF	2	(Malaysia) Dion Cools	12	2	3	3	0	20
16	GK	16	(Iceland) Elías Rafn Ólafsson	14	1	0	3	2	20
18	GK	1	(Denmark) Jonas Lössl	8	3	4	3	0	18
18	MF	11	(Australia) Awer Mabil	9	1	4	2	0	16
18	MF	18	(Zambia) Edward Chilufya	13	3	0	0	0	16
21	DF	17	(Denmark) Mads Døhr Thychosen	11	3	0	0	1	15
22	FW	48	(Denmark) Mads Hansen	7	2	4	1	0	14
22	GK	31	(Denmark) David Ousted	11	3	0	0	0	14
24	MF	8	(Germany) Max Meyer	8	3	0	0	2	13
25	FW	38	(Brazil) Marrony	7	1	0	2	1	11
26	MF	40	(Sweden) Jens Cajuste	5	1	0	4	0	10
26	FW	19	(Brazil) Vagner Love	9	1	0	0	0	10
28	MF	24	(Denmark) Oliver Sørensen	4	3	0	1	0	8
29	DF	20	(Denmark) Rasmus Nicolaisen	3	0	3	0	0	6
30	MF	34	(Iceland) Mikael Anderson	4	0	1	0	0	5
30	MF	43	(Denmark) Nicolas Madsen	4	0	1	0	0	5
32	MF	54	(Denmark) Oscar Fraulo	1	2	1	0	0	4
33	FW	58	(Denmark) Aral Şimşir	1	1	0	0	0	2
34	MF	39	(Denmark) Victor Torp	1	0	0	0	0	1
34	MF	40	(Hungary) Bozhidar Kraev	0	0	1	0	0	1
34	DF	55	(Denmark) Victor Bak Jensen	1	0	0	0	0	1

=== Goalscorers ===
This includes all competitive matches.

Rnk	Pos	No.	Player	Superliga	Danish Cup	UEFA Champions League	UEFA Europa League	UEFA Europa Conference League	Total
1	MF	10	(Brazil) Evander	12	2	1	2	0	17
2	FW	74	(Brazil) Júnior Brumado	8	2	0	0	0	10
2	MF	36	(Denmark) Anders Dreyer	8	2	0	0	0	10
4	FW	45	(Denmark) Gustav Isaksen	5	1	0	2	0	8
5	DF	28	(Denmark) Erik Sviatchenko	4	1	0	1	0	6
6	FW	53	(Denmark) Victor Lind	3	2	0	0	0	5
7	MF	37	(Nigeria) Raphael Onyedika	2	1	1	0	0	4
8	MF	11	(Australia) Awer Mabil	1	1	1	0	0	3
8	DF	6	(Sweden) Joel Andersson	1	1	0	0	1	3
8	MF	18	(Zambia) Edward Chilufya	3	0	0	0	0	3
11	MF	7	(Denmark) Pione Sisto	2	0	0	0	0	2
11	DF	44	(Denmark) Nikolas Dyhr	1	0	0	1	0	2
11	MF	35	(Brazil) Charles	1	1	0	0	0	2
11	DF	14	(Denmark) Henrik Dalsgaard	2	0	0	0	0	2
11	DF	17	(Denmark) Mads Døhr Thychosen	2	0	0	0	0	2
16	FW	58	(Denmark) (Turkey) Aral Şimşir	0	1	0	0	0	1
16	DF	29	(Brazil) Paulinho	1	0	0	0	0	1
16	FW	48	(Denmark) Mads Hansen	1	0	0	0	0	1
16	DF	5	(Denmark) Daniel Høegh	0	0	0	0	1	1
16	FW	19	(Brazil) Vagner Love	1	0	0	0	0	1
16	DF	73	(Brazil) Juninho	1	0	0	0	0	1
	O.G.		Opponent Own goal	0	0	0	1	0	1
TOTALS				59	15	3	7	2	86

=== Assists ===
This includes all competitive matches.

Rnk	Pos	No.	Player	Superliga	Danish Cup	UEFA Champions League	UEFA Europa League	UEFA Europa Conference League	Total
1	DF	6	(Sweden) Joel Andersson	6	3	0	1	0	10
2	MF	10	(Brazil) Evander	6	1	0	1	1	9
3	MF	36	(Denmark) Anders Dreyer	8	0	0	0	0	8
4	MF	7	(Denmark) Pione Sisto	3	3	1	0	0	7
5	MF	45	(Denmark) Gustav Isaksen	5	0	0	0	0	5
6	MF	11	(Australia) Awer Mabil	3	1	0	0	0	4
7	DF	44	(Denmark) Nikolas Dyhr	2	1	0	0	0	3
7	MF	18	(Zambia) Edward Chilufya	3	0	0	0	0	3
9	DF	14	(Denmark) Henrik Dalsgaard	1	0	1	0	0	2
9	MF	37	(Nigeria) Raphael Onyedika	2	0	0	0	0	2
9	MF	8	(Germany) Max Meyer	0	1	0	0	1	2
12	DF	29	(Brazil) Paulinho	1	0	0	0	0	1
12	GK	16	(Iceland) Elías Rafn Ólafsson	1	0	0	0	0	1
12	FW	29	(Brazil) Paulinho	1	0	0	0	0	1
12	FW	74	(Brazil) Júnior Brumado	1	0	0	0	0	1
12	FW	48	(Denmark) Mads Hansen	0	1	0	0	0	1
12	MF	35	(Brazil) Charles	1	0	0	0	0	1
TOTALS				44	11	2	2	2	61

=== Clean sheets ===
This includes all competitive matches.

Rnk	Pos	No.	Player	Superliga	Danish Cup	UEFA Champions League	UEFA Europa League	UEFA Europa Conference League	Total
1	GK	16	(Iceland) Elías Rafn Ólafsson	6	1	0	0	1	8
2	GK	1	(Denmark) Jonas Lössl	3	1	0	2	0	6
3	GK	31	(Denmark) David Ousted	2	2	0	0	0	4
TOTALS				11	4	0	2	1	18

=== Disciplinary record ===
This includes all competitive matches.

Rnk	Pos.	No.	Player	Superliga		Danish Cup		UEFA Champions League		UEFA Europa League		UEFA Europa Conference League		Total	
Rnk	Pos.	No.	Player	Booked	Sent off (straight red)	Booked	Sent off (straight red)	Booked	Sent off (straight red)	Booked	Sent off (straight red)	Booked	Sent off (straight red)	Booked	Sent off (straight red)
1	MF	37	(Nigeria) Raphael Onyedika	7	0	1	0	2	0	3	0	2	0	15	0
2	FW	74	(Brazil) Júnior Brumado	6	0	0	0	1	0	0	0	0	0	7	0
2	MF	35	(Brazil) Charles	4	0	1	0	0	0	2	0	0	0	7	0
4	MF	53	(Brazil) Evander	2	1	1	0	1	0	2	0	0	0	6	1
4	DF	29	(Brazil) Paulinho	5	0	0	0	0	0	1	0	0	0	5	0
5	MF	7	(Denmark) Pione Sisto	3	0	1	0	1	0	0	0	0	0	5	0
5	DF	5	(Denmark) Erik Sviatchenko	4	0	0	0	0	0	1	0	0	0	5	0
8	DF	44	(Denmark) Nikolas Dyhr	1	0	1	0	0	0	1	0	1	0	4	0
8	DF	5	(Denmark) Daniel Høegh	3	0	1	0	0	0	0	0	0	0	4	0
8	MF	36	(Denmark) Anders Dreyer	0	0	1	0	2	1	0	0	0	0	3	1
11	DF	73	(Brazil) Juninho	1	0	0	0	0	0	1	1	0	0	2	1
11	DF	6	(Sweden) Joel Andersson	2	0	0	0	0	0	1	0	0	0	3	0
11	DF	14	(Denmark) Henrik Dalsgaard	3	0	0	0	0	0	0	0	0	0	3	0
11	DF	17	(Denmark) Mads Døhr Thychosen	1	0	2	0	0	0	0	0	0	0	3	0
15	GK	16	(Iceland) Elías Rafn Ólafsson	1	0	0	0	0	0	1	0	0	0	2	0
15	MF	40	(Sweden) Jens Cajuste	0	0	0	0	0	0	2	0	0	0	2	0
15	FW	45	(Denmark) Gustav Isaksen	0	0	1	0	0	0	1	0	0	0	2	0
15	GK	1	(Denmark) Jonas Lössl	0	0	2	0	0	0	0	0	0	0	2	0
15	FW	53	(Denmark) Victor Lind	1	0	1	0	0	0	0	0	0	0	2	0
20	FW	38	(Denmark) Marrony	1	0	0	0	0	0	0	0	0	0	1	0
20	MF	54	(Denmark) Oscar Fraulo	1	0	0	0	0	0	0	0	0	0	1	0
20	GK	31	(Denmark) David Ousted	1	0	0	0	0	0	0	0	0	0	1	0
TOTALS				47	2	13	0	7	1	15	1	3	0	85	4
