= 2022 Danish Cup final =

2022 Sydbank Pokalen final
- Event: 2021–22 Danish Cup
OB	Midjylland
0	0
- After extra time Midtjylland won 4–3 on penalties
- Date: 26 May 2022
- Venue: Brøndby Stadium, Brøndbyvester

The 2022 Danish Cup final was played on 26 May 2022 between OB and Midjylland at Brøndby Stadium, Brøndbyvester, a neutral ground. The final match was the culmination of the 2021–22 Danish Cup, the 68th season of the Sydbank Pokalen.

OB appeared in their 7th Cup final, sporting a 5–1 record in cup finals. The club's last Cup title came in 2007. Midtjylland, the Cup winner in 2019 and a 4-times runner up, competed in their 6th final.

The winner of the final earned an automatic berth into the playoff round of the 2022–23 UEFA Europa League.

== Teams ==
Team	Previous finals appearances (bold indicates winners)
OB	6 (1974, **1983**, **1992**, **1993**, **2002**, **2007**)
Midtjylland	5 (2003, 2005, 2010, 2011, **2019**)

== Venue ==
For just the fifth time in cup history, the final will be played in a venue other than the Copenhagen Sports Park (1955–1990), or Parken Stadium (1993–2019). Brøndby Stadium in Brøndbyvester will host the 2022 final. Odense Stadium hosted the 1991 final while the 1992 final was played at Aarhus Idrætspark.

== Route to the final ==
Note: In all results below, the score of the finalist is given first (H: home; A: away).

OB		Round	Midtjylland	
Opponent	Result		Opponent	Result
Bye		First round	Bye	
FC Roskilde	1–2 (A)	Second round	Bye	
FC Helsingør	0–3 (A)	Third round	Kjellerup IF	0–5 (A)
FC Nordsjælland	1–4 (a.e.t) (A)	Fourth round	AaB	3–1 (a.e.t) (H)
Randers FC	**3–2 (agg.)**; 0–2 (A) / 1–2 (H)	Quarterfinals	Brøndby IF	**3–2 (agg.)**; 0–2 (A) / 1–2 (H)
SønderjyskE	**5–1 (agg.)**; 1–2 (A) / 3–0 (H)	Semifinals	Vejle	**4–1 (agg.)**; 0–1 (A) / 3–1 (H)

== Match ==
=== Details ===
26 May 2022
15:00

OB (1)	0–0 (a.e.t.)	Midtjylland (1)
Ivančević (yellow card) 48'	Report	Onyedika (yellow card) 67'; Thychosen (yellow card) 72'; Dreyer (yellow card) 105+3'
Penalties
Thomasen (penalty scored); Okosun (penalty missed); Jebali (penalty scored); Kadrii (penalty scored); Larsen (penalty missed)	3–4	(penalty scored) Dreyer; (penalty missed) Sviatchenko; (penalty scored) Sisto; (penalty scored) Onyedika; (penalty scored) Evander

Brøndby Stadium, Brøndbyvester
Attendance: 23,328
Referee: Sandi Putros

**Odense**	**Midtyjlland**

GK	13	(Denmark) Hans Christian Bernat
RB	2	(Norway) Nicholas Mickelson
CB	5	(Denmark) Kasper Larsen
CB	22	(Serbia) Mihajlo Ivančević (yellow card) 48'
LB	16	(Norway) Jørgen Skjelvik
DM	6	(Denmark) Jeppe Tverskov (substituted off) 80'
DM	20	(Denmark) Ayo Simon Okosun
RM	11	(United States) Emmanuel Sabbi (substituted off) 103'
AM	29	(Denmark) Mads Frøkjær-Jensen (substituted off) 74'
LM	10	(Norway) Sander Svendsen (substituted off) 68'
ST	7	(Tunisia) Issam Jebali
Substitutes:
GK	30	(Ivory Coast) Sayouba Mandé
DF	24	(Norway) Robin Østrøm
DF	25	(Australia) Joel King
MF	8	(Denmark) Jakob Breum (substituted on) 68'
MF	14	(Denmark) Jens Jakob Thomasen (substituted on) 80'
FW	9	(Denmark) Bashkim Kadrii (substituted on) 103'
FW	15	(Denmark) Max Fenger (substituted on) 74'
Coach:
(Sweden) Andreas Alm

GK	31	(Denmark) David Ousted
CB	14	(Denmark) Henrik Dalsgaard
CB	5	(Denmark) Daniel Høegh (substituted off) 90+1'
CB	73	(Brazil) Juninho (substituted off) 76'
RM	6	(Sweden) Joel Andersson
CM	17	(Denmark) Mads Døhr Thychosen (yellow card) 72' (substituted off) 96'
CM	37	(Nigeria) Raphael Onyedika (yellow card) 68'
LM	10	(Brazil) Evander
RF	18	(Zambia) Edward Chilufya (substituted off) 76'
CF	36	(Denmark) Anders Dreyer (yellow card) 105+3'
LF	45	(Denmark) Gustav Isaksen (substituted off) 63'
Substitutes:
GK	30	(Northern Ireland) Jared Thompson
DF	28	(Denmark) Erik Sviatchenko (substituted on) 90+1'
DF	29	(Brazil) Paulinho (substituted on) 76'
MF	7	(Denmark) Pione Sisto (substituted on) 63'
MF	8	(Germany) Max Meyer (substituted on) 76'
MF	35	(Brazil) Charles (substituted on) 96'
FW	53	(Denmark) Victor Lind
Coach:
(Denmark) Bo Henriksen

Assistant referees:

**Match rules**

- 90 minutes.
- 30 minutes of extra time if necessary.
- Penalty shoot-out if scores still level.
- Seven named substitutes, of which up to five may be used.
