= Mads Hansen (footballer, born 2002) =

Danish footballer

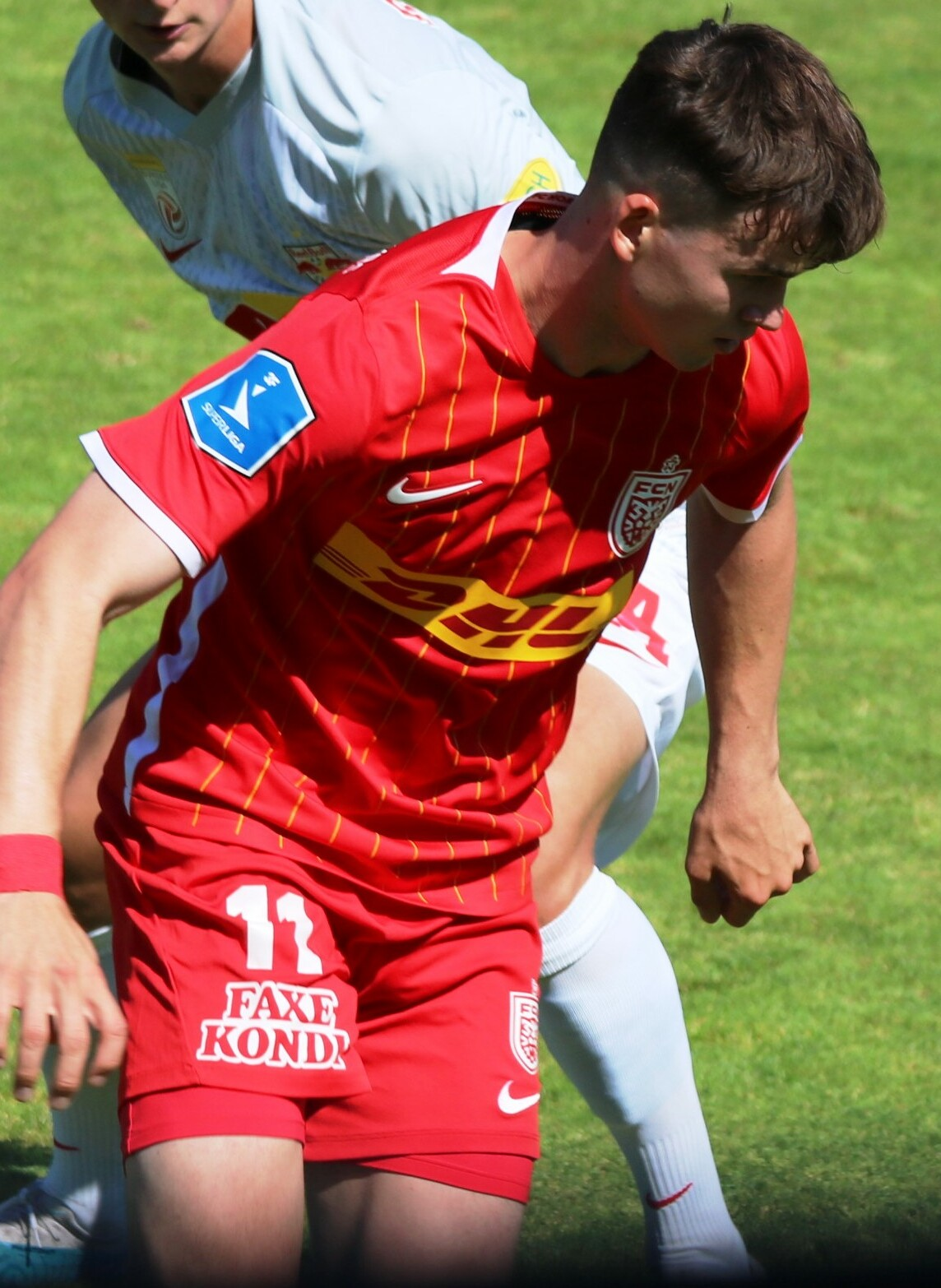
- Mads Hansen with Nordsjælland

Personal information
- Full name: Mads Kristian Hansen
- Date of birth: 28 July 2002 (age 24)
- Place of birth: Ikast, Denmark
- Height: 1.85 m (6 ft 1 in)
- Position: Right winger

Team information
- Current team: Brommapojkarna
- Number: 9

Youth career
- 2007–2015: Ikast FC
- 2015–2021: Midtjylland

Senior career*
Years	Team	Apps	(Gls)
2021–2022	Midtjylland	7	(1)
2022–2025	Nordsjælland	70	(7)
2025–2026	Brann	24	(0)
2026–	Brommapojkarna	10	(4)

International career^{‡}
2019	Denmark U17	7	(0)
2019–2020	Denmark U18	5	(3)
2020	Denmark U19	3	(1)
2022–2025	Denmark U21	11	(2)
- * Club domestic league appearances and goals as of 8 July 2026 ‡ National team caps and goals as of 24 March 2025

Mads Kristian Hansen (born 28 July 2002) is a Danish professional footballer who plays as a right winger for Allsvenskan club Brommapojkarna.

== Club career ==
=== Midtjylland ===
Born in Ikast, Hansen grew up as a fan of local club FC Midtjylland, whose academy he joined at U13-level from his childhood club Ikast FC. After finishing as top goalscorer in the U19 League, he signed his first professional contract on his 18th birthday, 28 July 2020, keeping him at the club until 2025. After a season in which he stood out by scoring 19 goals in 23 games with the U19s, he was named Midtjylland U19 Player of the Year.

Hansen was promoted to the first team in the summer of 2021. He made his professional debut under new head coach Bo Henriksen during a UEFA Champions League preliminary round 1–1 draw against Scottish club Celtic away at Celtic Park. Hansen made his Danish Superliga debut a few days later in a 2–0 away win over rivals Viborg FF, coming on as a substitute for Júnior Brumado. On 24 October, he scored his first goal in injury time against SønderjyskE, which proved to be the winner in a 3–2 victory.

=== Nordsjælland ===
On 1 February 2022, Hansen joined Nordsjælland on a deal until June 2026. He made his competitive debut on 20 February in a 2–0 league loss to Brøndby, starting at centre-back. On 7 March, he scored his first goal for the club in a 3–2 victory against AGF.

=== Brann ===
On 18 January 2025, Hansen signed a four-year contract with Eliteserien club Brann, running until December 2028.

=== Brommapojkarna ===
On 8 February 2026, Hansen signed a contract with Swedish side IF Brommapojkarna.

== International career ==
A youth international, Hansen made his debut for the Denmark U19 team on 3 September 2020, starting in a 2–1 win over Germany U19 at Edmund-Plambeck-Stadion in Norderstedt, Hamburg.

In November 2022, Hansen was called up to the Denmark under-21 team, gaining his first cap at that level on 17 November 2022 in a friendly against Sweden.

== Career statistics ==
As of match played 8 July 2026

Appearances and goals by club, season and competition
Club	Season	League			Cup		Europe		Total	
Club	Season	Division	Apps	Goals	Apps	Goals	Apps	Goals	Apps	Goals
Midtjylland	2021–22	Danish Superliga	7	1	2	0	5 (Note: Four appearances in UEFA Champions League, one appearance in UEFA Europa League)	0	14	1
Nordsjælland	2021–22	Danish Superliga	15	2	—		—		15	2
Nordsjælland	2022–23	Danish Superliga	26	2	5	3	—		31	5
Nordsjælland	2023–24	Danish Superliga	19	2	2	0	2 (Note: Appearances in UEFA Conference League)	0	23	2
Nordsjælland	2024–25	Danish Superliga	10	1	1	0	—		11	1
Nordsjælland	Total		70	7	8	3	2	0	80	10
Brann	2025	Eliteserien	24	0	3	3	7 (Note: Two appearances in UEFA Champions League, five appearances and one goal in UEFA Europa League)	1	34	4
Brommapojkarna	2026	Allsvenskan	10	4	3	2	—		13	6
Career total			111	12	16	8	14	1	141	21
