= Jonas Lössl =

Danish footballer (born 1989)

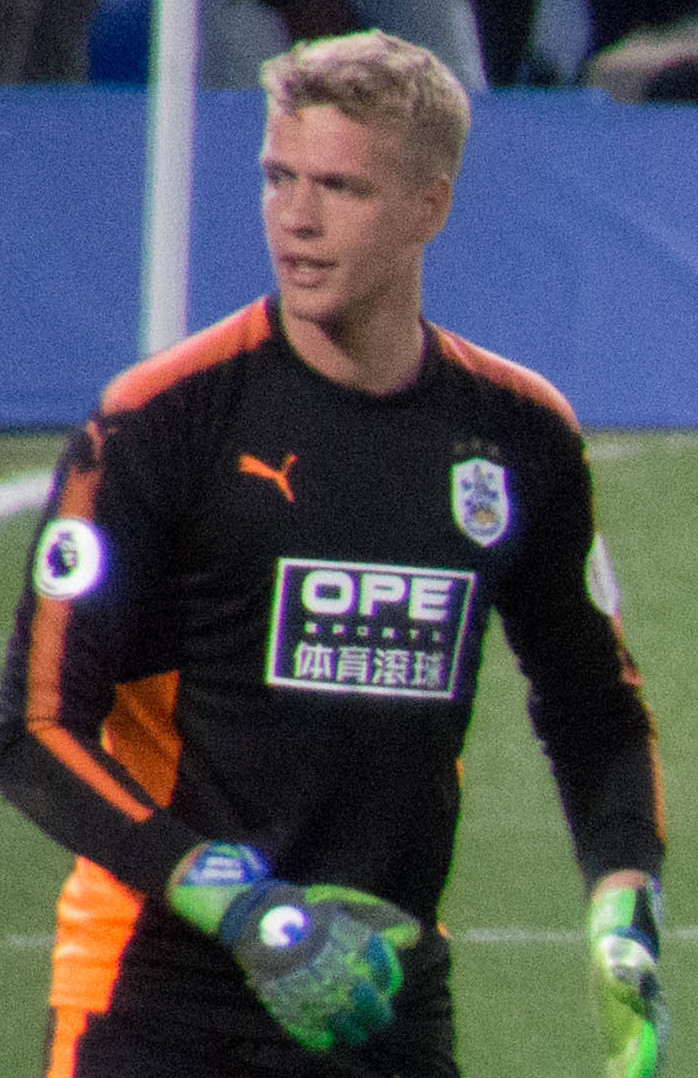
- Lössl with Huddersfield Town in 2018

Personal information
- Full name: Jonas Bybjerg Lössl
- Date of birth: 1 February 1989 (age 37)
- Place of birth: Kolding, Denmark
- Height: 1.95 m (6 ft 5 in)
- Position: Goalkeeper

Youth career
- 1996–2004: Kolding
- 2004–2008: Midtjylland

Senior career*
Years	Team	Apps	(Gls)
2008–2014	Midtjylland	127	(0)
2014–2016	Guingamp	67	(0)
2016–2018	Mainz 05	27	(0)
2017–2018	→ Huddersfield Town (loan)	38	(0)
2018–2019	Huddersfield Town	31	(0)
2019–2021	Everton	0	(0)
2020	→ Huddersfield Town (loan)	15	(0)
2021–2026	Midtjylland	86	(0)
2022	→ Brentford (loan)	2	(0)
Total		393	(0)

International career
2005	Denmark U17	3	(0)
2006	Denmark U18	1	(0)
2007–2008	Denmark U19	2	(0)
2008	Denmark U20	1	(0)
2009–2011	Denmark U21	15	(0)
2016	Denmark	1	(0)
- * Club domestic league appearances and goals

Jonas Bybjerg Lössl (Danish pronunciation: [ˈjoː.næs ˈløː.sl]; born 1 February 1989) is a Danish former professional footballer who played as a goalkeeper.

After beginning his professional career with Midtjylland, he played in France for Guingamp, in Germany for Mainz 05, and in England for Huddersfield Town and Everton. In January 2021, he returned to Midtjylland, where he was usually used as a backup goalkeeper up until his retirement in 2026.

Lössl made his senior international debut for Denmark in March 2016, and was part of their squad at the 2018 FIFA World Cup and UEFA Euro 2020.

== Early and personal life ==
Born in Kolding, Denmark, one of Lössl's grandparents is of German descent. For this reason, his surname is written with "ö" instead of the "ø" which is otherwise the normal spelling of this letter in the Danish language.

== Club career ==
=== Midtjylland ===
A product of the Midtjylland football academy, Lössl made his Danish Superliga debut with Midtjylland in March 2010. He played a total number of 137 matches for the club.

=== Guingamp ===
On 5 June 2014, FC Midtjylland reported that they had sold Lössl to French football club, Guingamp. After initially starting his first season as a backup keeper at the club, Lössl eventually established himself as the club's first-choice keeper in his two seasons at the club.

=== Mainz 05 ===
On 16 June 2016, it was reported that Lössl was making a move to German club Mainz 05. The club cited that they intended Lössl to be the instant replacement for the club's previous keeper, Loris Karius, who himself had transferred to Liverpool.

=== Huddersfield Town and Everton ===
After one season at Mainz, Lössl signed for Huddersfield Town on a season-loan on 30 June 2017. On 12 August 2017, Lössl made his debut for Huddersfield in a 3–0 win against Crystal Palace. In March 2018, following a successful loan spell in which he kept 10 Premier League clean sheets, Huddersfield activated a clause in Lössl's loan deal from Mainz, and signed him permanently for an undisclosed fee. Following Huddersfield Town's relegation from the Premier League in 2019, Lössl joined fellow English club Everton on a free transfer on 1 July 2019. Completely unused, he returned to Huddersfield on loan on 31 January 2020 for the rest of the Championship season.

On 1 February 2021, Lössl left Everton to return to Denmark to sign with Midtjylland.

=== Return to Midtjylland ===
On 1 February 2021, following his departure from Everton, Lössl re-signed with his first professional club, Midtjylland. There, he took over after former starter Jesper Hansen, but eventually saw himself benched in favour of Elías Rafn Ólafsson after returning from injury under new head coach Bo Henriksen during the 2021–22 season.

==== Loan to Brentford ====
On 31 December 2021, Lössl signed for Premier League club Brentford on loan, effective from 1 January 2022. An option to make the deal permanent was included in the six-month loan deal.

==== Second return to Midtjylland and retirement ====
Lössl returned to Midtjylland ahead of the 2022–23 season, after media reports indicated that a move to Bordeaux had fallen through. He then regained the starting goalkeeper position at Midtjylland following the appointment of new head coach Albert Capellas in late August 2022.

In the 2023–24 season, Lössl played a key role as Midtjylland won their fourth Superliga title on the final matchday of the season. He was also voted Superliga Player of the Month for March 2024.

On 14 July 2024, Lössl extended his contract with Midtjylland until 2029 and was appointed club captain as part of the deal. He was also promised an administrative role at the club upon his retirement. Ahead of the 2024–25 season, Lössl was again benched in favor of Elías Rafn Ólafsson.

On 18 June 2026, Lössl announced his retirement from professional football aged 37.

== International career ==
Lössl played 22 games for various Danish national youth teams, including 15 games for the Denmark under-21 national football team. He was first called up to the senior Denmark squad in June 2015.

On 29 March 2016, Lössl made his Denmark debut as a half-time substitute for Kasper Schmeichel in a 1–0 friendly loss to Scotland, keeping a clean sheet in his 45 minutes.

Lössl was included in Denmark's squad for the 2018 FIFA World Cup in Russia, but did not play in the tournament.

On 25 May 2021, Lössl was named in the Denmark squad for UEFA Euro 2020, and was an unused substitute for all matches.

== Career statistics ==
=== Club ===
Appearances and goals by club, season and competition
Club	Season	League			National cup		League cup		Europe		Other		Total	
Club	Season	Division	Apps	Goals	Apps	Goals	Apps	Goals	Apps	Goals	Apps	Goals	Apps	Goals
Midtjylland	2007–08	Danish Superliga	0	0	0	0	—		0	0	—		0	0
Midtjylland	2008–09	Danish Superliga	0	0	0	0	—		0	0	—		0	0
Midtjylland	2009–10	Danish Superliga	12	0	3	0	—		—		—		15	0
Midtjylland	2010–11	Danish Superliga	30	0	3	0	—		—		—		33	0
Midtjylland	2011–12	Danish Superliga	25	0	0	0	—		0	0	—		25	0
Midtjylland	2012–13	Danish Superliga	27	0	1	0	—		2 (Note: Appearances in UEFA Europa League)	0	—		30	0
Midtjylland	2013–14	Danish Superliga	33	0	1	0	—		—		—		34	0
Midtjylland	Total		127	0	8	0	—		2	0	—		137	0
Guingamp	2014–15	Ligue 1	30	0	2	0	1	0	7	0	—		40	0
Guingamp	2015–16	Ligue 1	37	0	2	0	3	0	—		—		42	0
Guingamp	Total		67	0	4	0	4	0	7	0	—		82	0
Mainz 05	2016–17	Bundesliga	27	0	2	0	—		5	0	—		34	0
Huddersfield (loan)	2017–18	Premier League	38	0	2	0	0	0	—		—		40	0
Huddersfield	2018–19	Premier League	31	0	0	0	1	0	—		—		32	0
Huddersfield	Huddersfield Total		69	0	2	0	1	0	—		—		72	0
Everton	2019–20	Premier League	0	0	0	0	0	0	—		—		0	0
Everton	2020–21	Premier League	0	0	0	0	0	0	—		—		0	0
Everton	Total		0	0	0	0	0	0	—		—		0	0
Huddersfield (loan)	2019–20	Championship	15	0	0	0	0	0	—		—		15	0
Midtjylland	2020–21	Danish Superliga	13	0	2	0	—		—		—		15	0
Midtjylland	2021–22	Danish Superliga	8	0	3	0	—		7 (Note: Four appearances in UEFA Champions League, three appearances in UEFA Europa League)	0	—		18	0
Midtjylland	2022–23	Danish Superliga	24	0	1	0	—		8	0	1 (Note: Appearance in Danish Superliga European play-offs)	0	34	0
Midtjylland	2023–24	Danish Superliga	26	0	0	0	—		6 (Note: Appearances in UEFA Europa Conference League)	0	—		32	0
Midtjylland	2024–25	Danish Superliga	10	0	2	0	—		6 (Note: One appearance in UEFA Champions League, five appearances in UEFA Europa League)	0	—		18	0
Midtjylland	2025–26	Danish Superliga	5	0	2	0	—		2	0	—		9	0
Midtjylland	Total		86	0	10	0	—		29	0	1	0	125	0
Brentford (loan)	2021–22	Premier League	2	0	1	0	0	0	—		—		3	0
Career total			393	0	27	0	5	0	43	0	1	0	468	0

=== International ===
Appearances and goals by national team and year
National team	Year	Apps	Goals
Denmark	2016	1	0
Total		1	0

== Honours ==
Midtjylland

- Danish Superliga: 2023–24
- Danish Cup: 2025–26

Individual

- Superliga Player of the Month: March 2024
