= 2021–22 Danish Superliga =

32nd season of Danish Superliga

Superliga
- Season: 2021–22
- Dates: 16 July 2021 – 29 May 2022
- Champions: Copenhagen
- Relegated: Vejle; Sønderjyske
- Champions League: Copenhagen; Midtjylland
- Europa League: Silkeborg
- Europa Conference League: Brøndby; Viborg
- Matches: 193
- Goals: 512 (2.65 per match)
- Top goalscorer: Nicklas Helenius (16 goals)
- Biggest home win: OB 6–0 Vejle (1 October 2021)
- Biggest away win: SønderjyskE 0–6 Silkeborg (31 October 2021)
- Highest scoring: Aalborg 2–5 Viborg (25 October 2021)
- Longest winning run: 4 matches Silkeborg
- Longest unbeaten run: 4 matches Copenhagen; Randers; Silkeborg
- Longest winless run: 4 matches AGF; Brøndby; Vejle
- Longest losing run: 2 matches AGF; OB; SønderjyskE; Vejle; Viborg

The 2021–22 Danish Superliga (officially the 3F Superliga for sponsorship reasons) was the 32nd season of the Danish Superliga. Brøndby were the defending champions. The season began on 16 July 2021 and ended on 29 May 2022.

== Teams ==
Lyngby Boldklub (relegated after two years in the top flight) and AC Horsens (relegated after five years in the top flight) finished the 2020–21 season in 11th and 12th place, respectively, and were relegated to the 2021–22 1st Division.

The relegated teams were replaced by 2020–21 1st Division champions Viborg FF, who returned after four years of absence, as well as the runners-up Silkeborg IF who returned after a one-year absence.

=== Stadia and locations ===
Locations of the Danish Superliga 2021–22 teams

Club	Location	Stadium	Turf	Capacity	2020–21 position
AaB	Aalborg	Aalborg Portland Park	Hybrid	13,797	7th
AGF	Aarhus	Ceres Park	Hybrid	20,032	4th
Brøndby	Brøndby	Brøndby Stadium	Hybrid	29,000	1st
Copenhagen	Copenhagen	Parken	Hybrid	38,065	3rd
Midtjylland	Herning	MCH Arena	Natural	11,800	2nd
Nordsjælland	Farum	Right to Dream Park	Artificial	9,900	5th
OB	Odense	Nature Energy Park	Natural	15,633	9th
Randers	Randers	BioNutria Park Randers	Natural	12,000	6th
Silkeborg IF	Silkeborg	JYSK Park	Artificial	10,000	1D, 2nd
SønderjyskE	Haderslev	Sydbank Park	Natural	10,000	8th
Vejle	Vejle	Vejle Stadion	Natural	10,418	10th
Viborg FF	Viborg	Energi Viborg Arena	Hybrid	9,566	1D, 1st

=== Personnel and sponsoring ===
Note: Flags indicate national team as has been defined under FIFA eligibility rules. Players and Managers may hold more than one non-FIFA nationality.

Team	Head coach	Captain	Kit manufacturer	Shirt sponsor
AaB	(Denmark) Lars Friis	(Denmark) Lucas Andersen	Macron	Spar Nord
AGF	(Denmark) David Nielsen	(Denmark) Patrick Mortensen	Hummel	Ceres
Brøndby IF	(Denmark) Niels Frederiksen	(Denmark) Andreas Maxsø	Hummel	Booztlet
Copenhagen	(Denmark) Jess Thorup	(Greece) Zeca	Adidas	Unibet
Midtjylland	(Denmark) Bo Henriksen	(Denmark) Erik Sviatchenko	Nike	Det Faglige Hus
Nordsjælland	(Denmark) Flemming Pedersen	(Denmark) Kian Hansen	Nike	DHL
OB	(Sweden) Andreas Alm	(Denmark) Jens Jakob Thomasen	Hummel	Albani
Randers	(Denmark) Thomas Thomasberg	(Denmark) Erik Marxen	Puma	Verdo A/S
Silkeborg IF	(Denmark) Kent Nielsen	(Denmark) Nicklas Helenius	Uhlsport	JYSK
SønderjyskE	(Denmark) Henrik Hansen	(Denmark) Marc Dal Hende	Hummel	Danfoss
Vejle Boldklub	(Croatia) Ivan Prelec	(Denmark) Jacob Schoop	Hummel	Arbejdernes Landsbank
Viborg FF	(Denmark) Jacob Friis	(Denmark) Jeppe Grønning	Nike	Peter Larsen Kaffe

=== Managerial changes ===
Team	Outgoing manager	Manner of departure	Date of vacancy	Replaced by	Date of appointment	Position in table
SønderjyskE	(Denmark) Glen Riddersholm	Sacked	26 May 2021	(Germany) Michael Boris	1 July 2021	Pre-season
FC Midtjylland	(Denmark) Brian Priske	Signed by Royal Antwerp	29 May 2021	(Denmark) Bo Henriksen	1 July 2021	Pre-season
OB	(Denmark) Michael Hemmingsen	Returned to Director of Sports	31 May 2021	(Sweden) Andreas Alm	1 June 2021	Pre-season
Vejle Boldklub	(Romania) Constantin Gâlcă	End of contract	30 June 2021	(Denmark) Carit Falch	1 July 2021	Pre-season
Vejle Boldklub	(Denmark) Carit Falch	Sacked	17 August 2021	(Denmark) Peter Sørensen	24 August 2021	12th
SønderjyskE	(Germany) Michael Boris	Sacked	1 November 2021	(Denmark) Henrik Hansen	16 December 2021	11th
AaB	(Spain) Martí Cifuentes	Signed by Hammarby IF	12 January 2022	(Sweden) Oscar Hiljemark (caretaker)	22 February 2022	4th
Viborg FF	(Denmark) Lars Friis	Suspended (Signed by AaB) (Note: Lars Friis was signed by AaB as manager on 25 January, but his contract with Viborg prevented him from starting in that job until 1 August 2022. Viborg FF decided to suspend him and hire a new manager. Viborg and AaB agreed on a compensation in March 2022, which meant that Friis could start on 9 March 2022)	25 January 2022	(Denmark) Jacob Friis	3 February 2022	8th
AaB	(Sweden) Oscar Hiljemark	End of tenure as caretaker	9 March 2022	(Denmark) Lars Friis	9 March 2022	4th
Vejle Boldklub	(Denmark) Peter Sørensen	Sacked	14 March 2022	(Croatia) Ivan Prelec	15 March 2022	11th

== Regular season ==
=== League table ===
Pos	Team	Pld	W	D	L	GF	GA	GD	Pts	Qualification
1	Copenhagen	22	14	6	2	43	13	+30	48	Qualification for the Championship round
2	Midtjylland	22	13	3	6	37	22	+15	42	Qualification for the Championship round
3	Brøndby	22	11	7	4	30	24	+6	40	Qualification for the Championship round
4	AaB	22	11	5	6	36	26	+10	38	Qualification for the Championship round
5	Randers	22	9	6	7	26	25	+1	33	Qualification for the Championship round
6	Silkeborg	22	7	10	5	34	21	+13	31	Qualification for the Championship round
7	Viborg	22	6	9	7	31	33	−2	27	Qualification for the Relegation round
8	AGF	22	6	8	8	24	29	−5	26	Qualification for the Relegation round
9	OB	22	4	9	9	31	35	−4	21	Qualification for the Relegation round
10	Nordsjælland	22	5	6	11	24	37	−13	21	Qualification for the Relegation round
11	Vejle	22	4	4	14	21	48	−27	16	Qualification for the Relegation round
12	SønderjyskE	22	2	7	13	17	41	−24	13	Qualification for the Relegation round

Source: Danish Football Association (in Danish), Soccerway
Rules for classification: 1) Points; 2) Goal difference; 3) Goals scored; 4) Away goals scored; 5) Play-off (played on neutral ground if determining teams for different rounds); 6) Draw.

=== Results ===
Home \ Away	AAB	AGF	BRO	COP	MID	NOR	ODE	RAN	SIL	SON	VEJ	VIB
AaB	—	2–0	3–0	1–3	0–1	2–1	2–0	1–1	1–4	4–0	0–0	2–5
AGF	1–0	—	1–1	1–3	3–0	2–3	2–2	1–2	1–1	1–0	1–0	1–1
Brøndby	2–1	1–1	—	2–1	2–0	0–1	2–1	1–0	1–1	1–0	3–2	1–1
Copenhagen	2–2	1–1	4–2	—	0–1	1–0	2–0	3–0	0–0	2–0	3–0	1–1
Midtjylland	0–2	4–0	1–2	0–1	—	2–0	1–2	1–0	3–0	3–2	4–1	3–1
Nordsjælland	0–2	0–0	0–2	1–5	2–2	—	3–1	0–0	1–1	1–1	3–1	1–2
OB	2–3	0–0	2–2	0–2	2–2	2–0	—	1–2	1–1	2–1	6–0	2–3
Randers	1–1	1–0	1–1	0–2	1–3	3–2	1–1	—	2–1	1–0	4–1	0–1
Silkeborg	0–0	0–2	0–1	0–0	0–1	4–1	1–1	2–1	—	0–0	3–0	4–1
SønderjyskE	1–3	2–3	1–0	1–1	0–2	0–2	2–2	1–1	0–6	—	1–0	2–2
Vejle	0–1	3–2	2–2	0–4	1–1	2–0	2–0	0–2	2–4	3–1	—	1–1
Viborg	2–3	2–0	0–1	0–2	0–2	2–2	1–1	1–2	1–1	1–1	2–0	—

Source: soccerway.com
Legend: Blue = home team win; Yellow = draw; Red = away team win.

==== Results by round ====
Team ╲ Round	1	2	3	4	5	6	7	8	9	10	11	12	13	14	15	16	17	18	19	20	21	22
AaB	D	L	D	W	W	D	W	W	W	L	W	L	L	W	D	W	L	W	L	D	W	W
AGF	D	D	L	L	L	L	D	W	W	W	L	W	L	D	W	D	D	W	L	L	D	D
Brøndby	D	D	D	L	L	D	W	D	L	W	D	W	W	W	W	W	W	W	W	W	D	L
Copenhagen	D	D	W	W	W	W	W	W	L	W	D	D	L	W	D	D	W	W	W	W	W	W
Midtjylland	L	W	W	W	W	W	L	W	W	W	W	D	W	W	L	L	D	L	D	W	L	W
Nordsjælland	L	D	W	W	W	W	L	L	L	L	L	D	L	L	D	D	L	L	D	W	D	L
OB	W	D	L	L	D	D	D	W	L	D	W	L	D	D	L	L	W	L	D	D	L	L
Randers	W	D	W	W	W	D	L	L	W	L	D	W	W	L	D	W	L	L	D	L	W	D
Silkeborg	D	D	D	W	D	L	W	D	L	W	W	D	D	W	D	D	D	W	W	L	L	L
SønderjyskE	D	W	L	L	L	L	D	L	W	L	L	D	L	L	L	L	D	L	L	D	D	D
Vejle	L	L	D	L	L	L	L	L	D	L	L	L	W	L	W	L	D	L	W	D	L	W
Viborg	W	D	L	L	L	W	D	L	D	D	D	D	W	L	D	W	D	W	L	L	W	D

Source: Soccerway

== Championship round ==
Points and goals carried over in full from the regular season.

Pos	Team	Pld	W	D	L	GF	GA	GD	Pts	Qualification	COP	MID	SIL	BRO	AAB	RAN
1	Copenhagen (C)	32	20	8	4	56	19	+37	68	Qualification for the Champions League play-off round	—	1–0	2–1	2–0	3–0	0–1
2	Midtjylland	32	20	5	7	59	33	+26	65	Qualification for the Champions League second qualifying round	0–0	—	3–2	2–2	2–0	3–2
3	Silkeborg	32	13	10	9	54	37	+17	49	Qualification for the Europa League play-off round	3–1	1–4	—	3–0	4–2	1–0
4	Brøndby	32	13	9	10	40	41	−1	48	Qualification for the Europa Conference League second qualifying round	1–1	1–3	2–1	—	0–1	0–1
5	AaB	32	13	6	13	47	45	+2	45	Qualification for the European play-off match	0–1	1–2	1–2	1–3	—	3–0
6	Randers	32	12	7	13	36	42	−6	43		0–2	1–3	1–2	2–1	2–2	—

Source: Danish Football Association (in Danish), Soccerway
Legend: Blue = home team win; Yellow = draw; Red = away team win.
Rules for classification: 1) Points; 2) Goal difference; 3) Goals scored; 4) Away goals scored; 5) Play-off (played on neutral ground if determining teams for different rounds); 6) Draw.
(C) Champions

== Relegation round ==
Points and goals carried over in full from the regular season.

Pos	Team	Pld	W	D	L	GF	GA	GD	Pts	Qualification or relegation	VIB	ODE	NOR	AGF	VEJ	SON
1	Viborg (O)	32	10	14	8	45	43	+2	44	Qualification for the European play-off match	—	1–1	1–1	1–0	2–2	1–0
2	OB	32	8	14	10	45	46	−1	38		1–1	—	2–1	1–0	2–1	1–1
3	Nordsjælland	32	8	12	12	38	47	−9	36		2–0	1–1	—	2–2	2–1	2–0
4	AGF	32	6	12	14	31	43	−12	30		0–2	1–2	2–2	—	0–0	1–1
5	Vejle (R)	32	7	8	17	31	60	−29	29	Relegation to Danish 1st Division	2–2	2–1	0–0	1–0	—	0–3
6	SønderjyskE (R)	32	4	11	17	28	54	−26	23	Relegation to Danish 1st Division	0–2	2–2	1–1	2–1	0–1	—

Source: Danish Football Association (in Danish), Soccerway
Legend: Blue = home team win; Yellow = draw; Red = away team win.
Rules for classification: 1) Points; 2) Goal difference; 3) Goals scored; 4) Away goals scored; 5) Play-off (played on neutral ground if determining teams for different rounds); 6) Draw.
(O) Play-off winners; (R) Relegated

== European play-offs ==
The fifth-placed team of the championship round, advanced to a play-off match against the winning team of the relegation round. The winners earned a place in the Europa Conference League second qualifying round.

=== European play-off match ===
29 May 2022
18:30

AaB	1–1 (a.e.t.)	Viborg FF
Ross 16'	Report	Grønning 24'
Penalties
Rinne (penalty missed); Prip (penalty missed); Ross (penalty scored); Ementa (penalty missed)	1–3	(penalty scored) Bonde; (penalty missed) Sørensen; (penalty scored) Bürgy; (penalty scored) Jatta

Aalborg Portland Park, Aalborg
Attendance: 7,819
Referee: Jakob Kehlet

== Season statistics ==
As of 29 May 2022

=== Top scorers and assists ===
Topscorers ranking
Rank	Player	Club	Goals
1	(Denmark) Nicklas Helenius	Silkeborg	17
2	(Denmark) Louka Prip	AaB	14
3	(Brazil) Evander	Midtjylland	12
4	(Denmark) Mikael Uhre	Brøndby	11
4	(Denmark) Sebastian Jørgensen	Silkeborg	11
4	(Spain) Pep Biel	Copenhagen	11
7	(Denmark) Nicolai Vallys	Silkeborg	10
7	(Tunisia) Issam Jebali	OB	10
9	(Ivory Coast) Simon Adingra	Nordsjælland	9
10	(Denmark) Anders Dreyer	Midtjylland	8
10	(Brazil) Júnior Brumado	Midtjylland	8
10	(Serbia) Milan Makarić	AaB	8
10	(Norway) Iver Fossum	AaB	8
14	(Denmark) Vito Hammershøy-Mistrati	Randers	7
14	(Nigeria) Stephen Odey	Randers	7

Assists ranking
Rank	Player	Club	Assists
1	(Denmark) Nicolai Vallys	Silkeborg	10
2	(Denmark) Sebastian Jørgensen	Silkeborg	9
3	(Denmark) Rasmus Carstensen	Silkeborg	8
3	(Denmark) Christian Sørensen	Viborg	8
3	(Denmark) Anders Dreyer	Midtjylland	8
3	(Sweden) Joel Andersson	Midtjylland	8
3	(Sweden) Simon Hedlund	Brøndby	8
8	(Denmark) Kasper Kusk	AaB	7
9	(Spain) Pep Biel	Copenhagen	6
9	(Brazil) Evander	Midtjylland	6
11	(Denmark) Kristoffer Pallesen	AaB	5
11	(Denmark) Gustav Isaksen	Midtjylland	5
11	(Sweden) Robert Gojani	Silkeborg	5
11	(Tunisia) Anis Slimane	Brøndby	5
11	(Tunisia) Issam Jebali	OB	5

Source: Soccerway

== Awards ==
=== Annual awards ===
Award	Winner	Club
Player of the Year	(Spain) Pep Biel	Copenhagen
Golden Boot	(Denmark) Nicklas Helenius	Silkeborg
Goalkeeper of the Year	(Poland) Kamil Grabara	Copenhagen
Breakthrough of the Year	(Nigeria) Raphael Onyedika	Midtjylland

Team of the Year
Goalkeeper	(Poland) Kamil Grabara (Copenhagen)				
Defence	(Denmark) Rasmus Carstensen (Silkeborg)	(Denmark) Rasmus Thelander (Aalborg)	(Denmark) Henrik Dalsgaard (Midtjylland)	(Denmark) Adam Sørensen (Lyngby)	
Midfield	(Denmark) Louka Prip (AaB)	(Denmark) Lukas Lerager (Copenhagen)	(Spain) Pep Biel (Copenhagen)	(Brazil) Evander (Midtjylland)	(Denmark) Nicolai Vallys (Silkeborg)
Attack	(Denmark) Nicklas Helenius (Silkeborg)				
