= Carit Falch =

Danish football manager

Personal information
- Full name: Carit Falch
- Date of birth: 16 December 1976 (age 49)
- Place of birth: Karlslunde, Denmark

Managerial career
- Years: Team
- 2014–2015: Brønshøj
- 2016–2018: Lithuania U21
- 2018–2019: Enosis Neon Paralimni
- 2020–2021: Lyngby
- 2021: Vejle
- 2023–2024: Fremad Amager

Carit Falch (born 16 December 1976) is a Danish football manager. He was most recently working as the manager of Danish 2nd Division club Fremad Amager.

== Career ==
He started managing youth players at Karlslunde IF, Greve Fodbold, Hvidovre IF, FC Nordsjælland, and HB Køge. In 2011-12 he was head analyzer and international scout for FC Nordsjælland who went on to win the Danish Championship, qualifying for Champions League Groupstage that year.

In HB Køge he was academy Director and at the same time working as a special U21 transition coach for the Danish FA.

In 2014 he got his first senior management job, as manager of Brønshøj Boldklub in the Danish 1st Division. He took the club to the Quarter Finals of the Danish Cup and broke 2 club records with 10 consecutive games without defeat, and 8 consecutive games with a clean sheet. He left the club after disagreements over strategy when the team was in a position to survive in the League. The club was relegated at the end of the season.

Falch then became academy director and later Technical Director at FC Helsingør in July 2015. He held that position until February 2017, when he was announced as new manager of the Lithuania national under-21 football team. Falch won the Baltic Championship with the Lithuanian U21 national team for the first time in 8 years and the team finished 2nd from the bottom in the European Championship Qualification group, with an away victory in the last game against Finland.

In November 2018 Falch moved to Cyprus to become new manager of Enosis Neon Paralimni FC in the Cypriot First Division. He led the club to the semifinals of the 2018–19 Cypriot Cup. This was the best cup result for the club in 17 years. Falch resigned in April 2019. The club survived, but got relegated next season.

Falch then returned to FC Nordsjælland to become 1st team assistant coach and head analyzer, and at the same time helping the youth department of FC Nordsjælland. In June 2020 he became temporary manager of the U19 team in Lyngby BK before being appointed manager of the 1st team in the Danish Superliga Lyngby Boldklub.

Falch took over a team at the very bottom of the League with only 1 point in the first part of the season, and he won 22 points in the 2nd part of the season, playing attractive attacking football and using many young players. But it was not enough to save Lyngby from relegation despite a run of good results. After the season, Superliga club Vejle BK paid a transfer to sign Falch as new manager of Vejle Boldklub. Vejle BK and Falch was to build a new Vejle team in the next 2-3 years with a new attractive playing style but after disagreements concerning transfer strategies and a difficult start to the 2021–22 season with four loses and a draw in the first five games during the transfer window, Vejle already fired Falch on 17 August 2021. Vejle BK hired 2 different coaches during the season but ended up being relegated.

On 4 January 2023 he was named new manager of Danish 1st Division club Fremad Amager. On 16th of June 2024 Fremad Amager and Carit Falch agreed to cancel the contract.
