= Nikolas Dyhr =

Danish footballer (born 2001)

Personal information
- Full name: Nikolas Langberg Dyhr
- Date of birth: 18 June 2001 (age 25)
- Place of birth: Horsens, Denmark
- Height: 1.77 m (5 ft 10 in)
- Position: Left-back

Team information
- Current team: Randers
- Number: 44

Youth career
- 2006–2012: Stensballe IK
- 2012–2015: Horsens
- 2015–2020: Midtjylland

Senior career*
Years	Team	Apps	(Gls)
2019–2024	Midtjylland	69	(2)
2021	→ Horsens (loan)	17	(0)
2023	→ Kortrijk (loan)	1	(0)
2024	St. Louis City	5	(0)
2024–	Randers	57	(3)

International career
2016–2017	Denmark U16	10	(2)
2017–2018	Denmark U17	15	(1)
2018	Denmark U18	4	(0)
2019–2020	Denmark U19	10	(0)
2020–2022	Denmark U21	4	(0)
- * Club domestic league appearances and goals as of 19 May 2026

Nikolas Langberg Dyhr (born 18 June 2001) is a Danish professional footballer who plays as a left-back for Danish Superliga side Randers.

== Career ==
Dyhr started playing football at local club, Stensballe IK, with his father as the coach. At the age of 11, he joined the U13 squad of AC Horsens and became the player of the year on the team. Dyhr then moved to FC Midtjylland as a U15 player in 2015. In July 2016, he signed a three-year youth contract and was promoted to the U17 squad.

In September 2018, 17-year old Dyhr was on the bench for Midtjylland in a Danish Cup game against Dalum IF. On 20 June 2019, two days after his 18th birthday, Dyhr signed a five-year professional contract with Midtjylland and was promoted permanently to the first team squad. On 11 August 2019, Dyhr got his official debut against his former club, AC Horsens, in the Danish Superliga. Dyhr played the entire game which Midtjylland won 2–0.

To find more continuity, Dyhr was loaned out to AC Horsens on 17 January 2021 for the rest of the season. He then played two years back at Midtjylland, before joining Belgian Pro League club KV Kortrijk on 30 January 2023: a loan deal until the end of the season.

On 8 January 2024 it was confirmed that Major League Soccer club St. Louis City SC had acquired Dyhr, who signed a three-year deal with an option for an additional year. Six months later, Dyhr was sold to Danish Superliga side Randers FC on a four-year deal.

== Career statistics ==
=== Club ===
As of match played 22 September 2024

Club	Season	League			National Cup (Note: Includes Danish Cup, Belgian Cup, U.S. Open Cup)		Continental		Other		Total	
Club	Season	Division	Apps	Goals	Apps	Goals	Apps	Goals	Apps	Goals	Apps	Goals
Midtjylland	2019-20	Danish Superliga	15	0	0	0	0	0	—		15	0
Midtjylland	2020-21	Danish Superliga	3	0	0	0	0	0	—		3	0
Midtjylland	2021-22	Danish Superliga	25	1	6	0	9 (Note: Three appearances in UEFA Champions League, Four appearances, one goal in UEFA Europa League, Two appearances in UEFA Europa Conference League)	1	—		40	2
Midtjylland	2022-23	Danish Superliga	13	1	2	0	7 (Note: Four appearances in UEFA Champions League, Three appearances in UEFA Europa League)	0	0	0	22	1
Midtjylland	2023-24	Danish Superliga	13	0	3	0	5 (Note: Appearance(s) in UEFA Europa Conference League)	0	—		21	0
Midtjylland	Total		69	2	11	0	21	1	0	0	101	3
Horsens (loan)	2020-21	Danish Superliga	17	0	0	0	—		—		17	0
Kortrijk (loan)	2022-23	Belgian Pro League	1	0	0	0	—		—		1	0
St. Louis City	2024	MLS	6	0	0	0	0	0	—		6	0
Randers	2024-25	Danish Superliga	9	0	0	0	—		—		9	0
Career total			102	2	11	0	21	1	0	0	134	3
