= Elías Ólafsson =

Icelandic footballer (born 2000)

Personal information
- Full name: Elías Rafn Ólafsson
- Date of birth: 11 March 2000 (age 26)
- Place of birth: Reykjavík, Iceland
- Height: 2.01 m (6 ft 7 in)
- Position: Goalkeeper

Team information
- Current team: Midtjylland
- Number: 16

Youth career
- 2005−2012: Breiðablik
- 2012−2013: Völsungur
- 2013−2018: Breiðablik
- 2018−2019: Midtjylland

Senior career*
Years	Team	Apps	(Gls)
2016–2018	Breiðablik	0	(0)
2017	→ FH (loan)	0	(0)
2018−	Midtjylland	78	(0)
2019−2020	→ Aarhus Fremad (loan)	20	(0)
2020−2021	→ Fredericia (loan)	26	(0)
2023−2024	→ Mafra (loan)	32	(0)

International career^{‡}
2016	Iceland U16	3	(0)
2018	Iceland U19	1	(0)
2019–2021	Iceland U21	7	(0)
2021–	Iceland	15	(0)
- * Club domestic league appearances and goals as of 19 September 2026 ‡ National team caps and goals as of 10 June 2026

Elías Rafn Ólafsson (born 11 March 2000) is an Icelandic professional footballer who plays as a goalkeeper for Danish Superliga side FC Midtjylland and the Iceland national team.

== Early life ==
Elías started playing football at the age of five. He also played both handball and volleyball in his youth and played two games for the Iceland national volleyball team in 2015. He subsequently quit both sports to fully focus on football.

== Club career ==
Elías came through the youth academy of Breiðablik. In July 2018, he was sold to reigning Danish champions Midtjylland. In 2019, he was loaned to Aarhus Fremad where he appeared in 20 games. In August 2020, he was loaned to Fredericia. In December 2020, he signed a five-year contract extension with Midtjylland. In September 2021, he was named the Danish Superliga Player of the Month.

On 18 July 2023 it was confirmed, that Ólafsson had joined Liga Portugal 2 club Mafra on a season-long loan deal. After the loan spell Ólafsson returned to Midtjylland.

== International career ==
Elías was selected to the Icelandic national team ahead of its friendly games against Canada and El Salvador in January 2020. He was an unused substitute in both games. In October 2020, Elías was diagnosed with COVID-19, following Iceland under-21 national team's 2–0 win over Luxembourg U21. In March 2021, he was selected for the Iceland U21 ahead of its games in the 2021 UEFA European Under-21 Championship.

He made his debut for the senior national team on 8 October 2021 in a World Cup qualifier against Armenia.

== Career statistics ==
=== Club ===
As of match played 19 September 2026

Appearances and goals by club, season and competition
Club	Season	League			National cup		League cup		Europe		Total	
Club	Season	Division	Apps	Goals	Apps	Goals	Apps	Goals	Apps	Goals	Apps	Goals
Breiðablik	2017	Úrvalsdeild	0	0	0	0	—		—		0	0
FH (loan)	2017	Úrvalsdeild	0	0	0	0	—		0	0	0	0
Aarhus Fremad (loan)	2019–20	Danish 2nd Division	20	0	0	0	—		—		20	0
Fredericia (loan)	2020–21	Danish 1st Division	26	0	0	0	—		—		26	0
Midtjylland	2021–22	Danish Superliga	14	0	1	0	—		5 (Note: Three appearances in UEFA Europa League, two appearances in UEFA Conference League)	0	20	0
Midtjylland	2022–23	Danish Superliga	8	0	1	0	—		4 (Note: Appearances in UEFA Champions League)	0	13	0
Midtjylland	2024–25	Danish Superliga	20	0	0	0	—		11 (Note: Five appearances in UEFA Champions League, six appearances in UEFA Europa League)	0	31	0
Midtjylland	2025–26	Danish Superliga	27	0	4	0	—		15 (Note: Appearances in UEFA Europa League)	0	46	0
Midtjylland	2026–27	Danish Superliga	9	0	0	0	—		6 (Note: Two appearances in UEFA Europa League, four appearances in UEFA Conference League)	0	15	0
Midtjylland	Total		78	0	6	0	0	0	41	0	125	0
Mafra (loan)	2023–24	Liga Portugal 2	32	0	1	0	0	0	—		33	0
Career total			155	0	7	0	0	0	41	0	203	0

=== International ===
As of match played 9 June 2026

Appearances and goals by national team and year
National team	Year	Apps	Goals
Iceland	2021	4	0
Iceland	2022	0	0
Iceland	2023	2	0
Iceland	2024	0	0
Iceland	2025	7	0
Iceland	2026	2	0
Total		15	0

== Honours ==
Midtjylland

- Danish Cup: 2025–26

Individual

- Danish Superliga Team of the Year: 2025–26
