= Juninho (footballer, born February 1995) =

Brazilian footballer

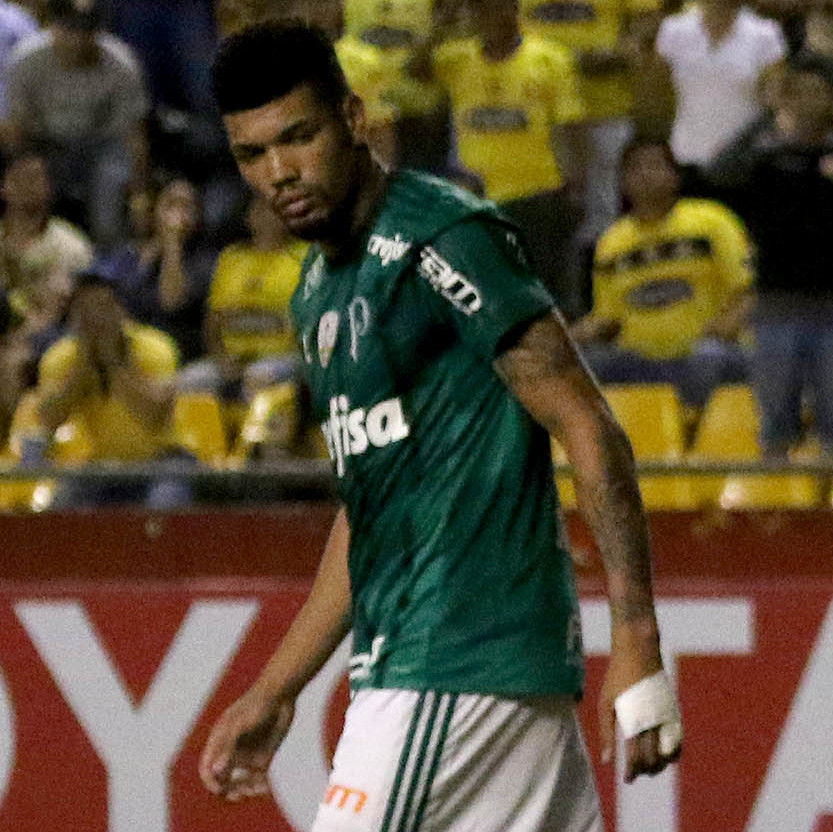
- Juninho playing for Palmeiras in 2017

Personal information
- Full name: José Carlos Ferreira Júnior
- Date of birth: 1 February 1995 (age 31)
- Place of birth: Londrina, Brazil
- Height: 1.87 m (6 ft 2 in)
- Position: Centre-back

Team information
- Current team: Internacional
- Number: 18

Youth career
- Junior Team
- 2012–2015: Coritiba

Senior career*
Years	Team	Apps	(Gls)
2015–2017	Coritiba	90	(1)
2017–2021	Palmeiras	25	(0)
2018	→ Atlético Mineiro (loan)	4	(0)
2019–2021	→ Bahia (loan)	72	(5)
2021–2025	Midtjylland	78	(3)
2025–	Internacional	27	(0)
- * Club domestic league appearances and goals as of 8 April 2026

José Carlos Ferreira Júnior (born 1 February 1995), commonly known as Juninho, is a Brazilian professional footballer who plays as a centre-back for Campeonato Brasileiro Série A club SC Internacional.

== Club career ==
=== Coritiba ===
Born in Londrina, Paraná, Juninho graduated with Coritiba's youth setup, after starting it out at Junior Team. On 6 July 2015 he was promoted to the main squad, after spending a year with the under-23s.

On 26 July 2015 Juninho made his Série A debut, starting in a 1–1 home draw against Corinthians. He became a regular starter in the following campaign, scoring his first professional goal on 2 June 2016 in a 3–4 home loss against Chapecoense.

=== Palmeiras ===
On 13 May 2017, Juninho signed for fellow top tier club Palmeiras until 2022, for a fee of €3 million for 40% of his federative rights.

==== Loan to Atlético Mineiro ====
On 27 April 2018, Palmeiras reached an agreement for Juninho to join Atlético Mineiro on loan until the end of the season.

=== Midtjylland ===
On 13 July 2021 it was confirmed, that Juninho had signed a five-year deal with Danish Superliga club FC Midtjylland.

=== Internacional ===
On February 28, 2025 Juninho was bought by Internacional, where he signed a contract until the end of 2027.

== Career statistics ==
As of match played 20 February 2025

Appearances and goals by club, season and competition
Club	Season	League			State League		National cup		Continental		Other		Total	
Club	Season	Division	Apps	Goals	Apps	Goals	Apps	Goals	Apps	Goals	Apps	Goals	Apps	Goals
Coritiba	2015	Série A	19	0	0	0	1	0	—		—		20	0
Coritiba	2016	Série A	36	1	15	0	2	0	6 (Note: Appearance(s) in Copa Sudamericana)	0	2 (Note: Appearance(s) in Primeira Liga)	0	61	1
Coritiba	2017	Série A	0	0	8	0	2	0	0	0	—		10	0
Coritiba	Total		55	1	23	0	5	0	6	0	2	0	91	1
Palmeiras	2017	Série A	21	0	—		0	0	1 (Note: Appearance(s) in Copa Libertadores)	0	—		22	0
Palmeiras	2018	Série A	0	0	3	0	—		0	0	—		3	0
Palmeiras	2019	Série A	0	0	0	0	0	0	0	0	—		0	0
Palmeiras	Total		21	0	3	0	0	0	1	0	—		25	0
Atlético Mineiro (loan)	2018	Série A	4	0	—		0	0	0	0	—		4	0
Bahia	2019	Série A	27	1	—		2	0	0	0	—		29	1
Bahia	2020	Série A	30	2	1	0	1	0	8	0	12 (Note: Appearance(s) in Copa do Nordeste)	1	52	3
Bahia	2021	Série A	9	1	0	0	2	0	3	1	6	0	20	2
Bahia	Total		66	4	1	0	5	0	11	1	18	1	101	6
Midtjylland	2021–22	Superliga	18	1	—		4	0	8 (Note: One appearance in UEFA Champions League, five appearances in UEFA Europa League, two appearances in UEFA Europa Conference League)	0	—		30	1
Midtjylland	2022–23	Superliga	25	1	—		2	0	9 (Note: Four appearances in UEFA Champions League, five appearances and one goal in UEFA Europa League)	1	1 (Note: Appearance in Superliga Europa Conference League play-off)	0	37	2
Midtjylland	2023–24	Superliga	25	0	—		1	0	6 (Note: Appearances in UEFA Europa Conference League)	1	—		32	1
Midtjylland	2024–25	Superliga	9	1	—		1	0	6 (Note: Five appearances in UEFA Champions League, one appearance in UEFA Europa League)	0	—		16	1
Midtjylland	Total		77	3	—		8	0	29	2	1	0	115	5
Career total			223	8	27	0	18	0	47	3	21	1	336	12

== Honours ==
Internacional

- Recopa Gaúcha: 2026

Individual

- Superliga Team of the Month: July 2023, September 2023
