= Homegrown Player Rule (UEFA) =

UEFA competitions rule

The Homegrown Player Rule is a rule for UEFA competitions that was first introduced in 2006–07 season and fully enforced beginning in the 2008–09 season. On top of a maximum 25 players for List A, clubs had to designate a minimum 8 players that were trained by clubs from the same national league, with 4 of them being from the club's own youth system. The rule in turn capped a maximum of 17 foreign trained players for the club in UEFA competitions.

The English Premier League enforced their own version beginning in 2010.

The purpose was to encourage clubs to develop local talents instead on relying on signing players from other clubs, following the aftermath of the Bosman ruling, which gave more power to richer clubs to buy talented players from smaller clubs.

== Definition ==
UEFA defines locally-trained or 'homegrown' players as those who, regardless of their nationality, have been trained by their club or by another club in the same national association for at least three years between the ages of 15 and 21.

It is thus possible for a player to be homegrown at up to two clubs and in two league systems.

== Criticism ==
In 2020 the Belgium club Royal Antwerp challenged the legibility of the homegrown player rule in the Belgian courts when they could not register Israeli player Lior Refaelov, arguing that Belgium had a natural disadvantage due the country's relatively smaller size, citing EU's competition laws. The case was later brought to the European Court of Justice. Here the advocate-general Maciej Szpunar disagreed with Royal Antwerp's argument, saying that due to the nature of the game, UEFA could have rules that seemed uncompetitive. He also wrote that "Systems in which homegrown players include not only those trained by the club at issue but also those of other clubs in the same national league, are not compatible with free-movement rules.”
