= Raphael Onyedika =

Nigerian footballer (born 2001)

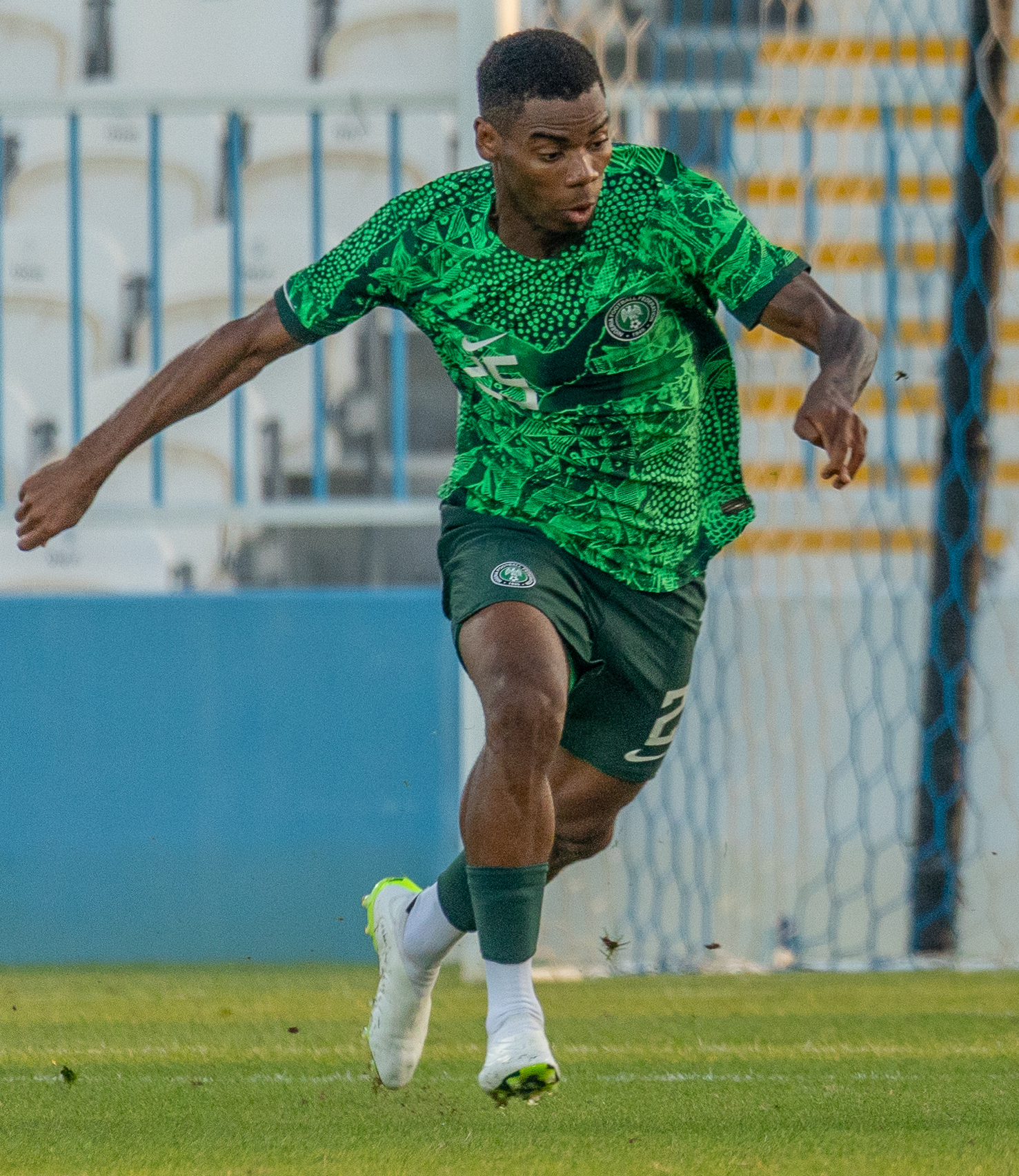
- Onyedika with Nigeria in 2023

Personal information
- Full name: Raphael Onyedika Nwadike
- Date of birth: 19 April 2001 (age 25)
- Place of birth: Onitsha, Anambra State, Nigeria
- Height: 1.84 m (6 ft 0 in)
- Position: Defensive midfielder

Team information
- Current team: Eintracht Frankfurt
- Number: 25

Youth career
- 2016–2019: Ebedei
- 2019–2020: Midtjylland

Senior career*
Years	Team	Apps	(Gls)
2020–2022	Midtjylland	37	(2)
2020–2021	→ Fredericia (loan)	28	(3)
2022–2026	Club Brugge	125	(5)
2026–	Eintracht Frankfurt	8	(1)

International career^{‡}
2022–	Nigeria	27	(3)
Medal record
Men's football
Representing Nigeria
Africa Cup of Nations
Runner-up	2023 Ivory Coast
Third place	2025 Morocco
- * Club domestic league appearances and goals as of 19:30, 1 November 2026 (UTC) ‡ National team caps and goals as of 23:10, 29 September 2026 (UTC)

Raphael Onyedika Nwadike MON (//; born 19 April 2001) is a Nigerian professional footballer who plays as a defensive midfielder for Bundesliga club Eintracht Frankfurt and the Nigeria national team.

== Club career ==
=== Midtjylland ===
Onyedika used to play street football before joining Nigerian club F.C. Ebedei's academy at the age of 15. After three years in Ebedei, Onyedika joined the academy of FC Midtjylland in Denmark, an affiliate club to FC Ebedei, shortly after his 18th birthday.

In his first full season in FC Midtjylland, he impressed in the U19 League and in the UEFA Youth League with his physique, speed and playing style. On 1 July 2020, he signed his first five-year professional contract with the club until June 2025. To gain more experience, Onyedika was loaned out to Midtjylland's affiliate club, Danish 1st Division-side FC Fredericia, on 19 August 2020 for the whole 2020–21 season. Onyedika did well on his loan spell, playing 28 games and scoring three goals. The season went well enough for the Nigerian to be named in TV3 Sport's team of the year in the Danish 1st Division.

Onyedika returned to Midtjylland in the summer 2021 and was promoted to the first team squad. He got his official debut for Midtjylland on 16 July 2021 against Odense Boldklub, the first game of the 2021–22 Danish Superliga, where he was in the starting line-up and played the whole game.

=== Club Brugge ===
On 28 August 2022, Onyedika signed a five-year contract with Club Brugge in Belgium.

== International career ==
In September 2022, Raphael Onyedika was first called up with the Nigeria national team by coach José Peseiro. He honours his first selection at this gathering on 27 September 2022 in a friendly match against Algeria. He came into play in place of Frank Onyeka in this match lost by the Nigerians (2–1 final score).

On 29 December 2023, he was selected in the list of 25 Nigerian players selected by José Peseiro to compete in the 2023 Africa Cup of Nations.

On 11 December 2025, Onyedika was called up to the Nigeria squad for the 2025 Africa Cup of Nations.

== Style of play ==
Raphael Onyedika is primarily a defensive midfielder, known for his physical strength, ball-winning ability, and tactical discipline. He excels at breaking up opposition play through interceptions and well-timed tackles, while also possessing the composure to retain possession under pressure. His athleticism allows him to cover ground quickly, and he often serves as a shield in front of the defense.

Onyedika also contributes to progressive build-up play, demonstrating good passing range and the ability to carry the ball forward. His style has drawn comparisons to classic holding midfielders, combining defensive solidity with transitional play.

== Career statistics ==
=== Club ===
As of match played 1 November 2026

Appearances and goals by club, season and competition
Club	Season	League			National cup (Note: Includes Danish Cup, Belgian Cup, DFB-Pokal)		Europe		Other		Total	
Club	Season	Division	Apps	Goals	Apps	Goals	Apps	Goals	Apps	Goals	Apps	Goals
Midtjylland	2020–21	Danish Superliga	0	0	0	0	0	0	0	0	0	0
Midtjylland	2021–22	Danish Superliga	31	2	6	1	11 (Note: Four appearances and one goal in UEFA Champions League, five appearances in UEFA Europa League, two appearances in UEFA Conference League)	1	—		48	4
Midtjylland	2022–23	Danish Superliga	6	0	0	0	3 (Note: Appearances in UEFA Champions League)	0	—		9	0
Midtjylland	Total		37	2	6	1	14	1	0	0	57	4
Fredericia (loan)	2020–21	Danish 1st Division	28	3	0	0	—		—		28	3
Club Brugge	2022–23	Belgian Pro League	31	0	2	0	7	0	—		40	0
Club Brugge	2023–24	Belgian Pro League	30	3	2	0	17 (Note: Appearances in UEFA Europa Conference League)	1	—		49	4
Club Brugge	2024–25	Belgian Pro League	34	1	6	0	10	1	1 (Note: Appearance in Belgian Super Cup)	0	52	2
Club Brugge	2025–26	Belgian Pro League	30	1	1	0	10	2	1	0	42	3
Club Brugge	Total		125	5	11	0	45	4	2	0	183	9
Eintracht Frankfurt	2026–27	Bundesliga	8	1	2	0	—		—		10	1
Career total			198	11	19	1	59	5	2	0	278	17

=== International ===
As of match played 29 September 2026

Appearances and goals by national team and year
National team	Year	Apps	Goals
Nigeria	2022	1	0
Nigeria	2023	2	0
Nigeria	2024	11	1
Nigeria	2025	5	2
Nigeria	2026	8	0
Total		27	3

Scores and results list Nigeria's goal tally first, score column indicates score after each Onyedika goal.

List of international goals scored by Raphael Onyedika
No.	Date	Venue	Cap	Opponent	Score	Result	Competition
1	10 June 2024	Felix Houphouet Boigny Stadium, Abidjan, Nigeria	9	Benin	1–0	2–1	2026 FIFA World Cup qualification
2	30 December 2025	Fez Stadium, Fez, Morocco	19	Uganda	2–0	3–1	2025 Africa Cup of Nations
3	30 December 2025	Fez Stadium, Fez, Morocco	19	Uganda	3–0	3–1	2025 Africa Cup of Nations

== Honours ==
FC Midtjylland

- Danish Superliga: 2019-20
- Danish Cup: 2021–22

Club Brugge

- Belgian Pro League: 2023–24, 2025–26
- Belgian Cup: 2024–25
- Belgian Super Cup: 2025

Nigeria

- Africa Cup of Nations runner-up: 2023; third place: 2025

Individual

- EaglesTracker Midfielder of the Season: 2023–24

Orders

- Member of the Order of the Niger
