= Joel Andersson =

Swedish footballer (born 1996)

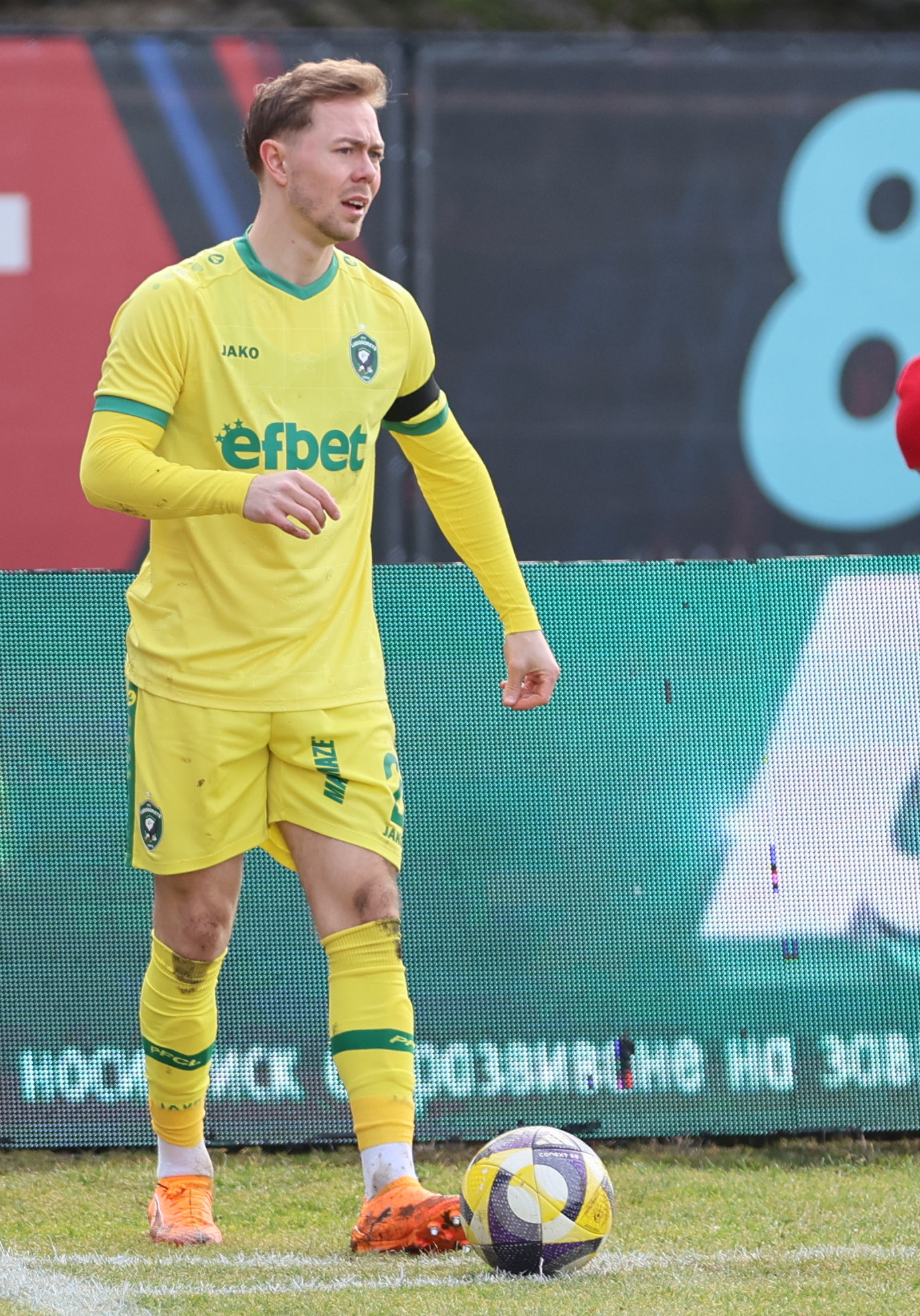

Personal information
- Full name: Eric Joel Andersson
- Date of birth: 11 November 1996 (age 30)
- Place of birth: Gothenburg, Sweden
- Height: 1.78 m (5 ft 10 in)
- Position: Right-back

Team information
- Current team: Ludogorets Razgrad
- Number: 2

Youth career
- –2012: Västra Frölunda IF
- 2013–2014: BK Häcken

Senior career*
Years	Team	Apps	(Gls)
2012	Västra Frölunda IF	4	(0)
2015–2018	BK Häcken	83	(2)
2018–2025	Midtjylland	154	(4)
2025–	Ludogorets Razgrad	25	(1)

International career^{‡}
2011	Sweden U17	3	(0)
2014–2015	Sweden U19	9	(1)
2017–2018	Sweden U21	10	(1)
2018–2022	Sweden	9	(0)
- * Club domestic league appearances and goals as of 9 September 2026 ‡ National team caps and goals as of 22:26, 28 September 2022 (UTC)

Eric Joel Andersson (born 11 November 1996) is a Swedish professional footballer who plays as a right-back for Bulgarian First League club Ludogorets Razgrad. He is the twin brother of Adam Andersson.

== Club career ==
=== BK Häcken ===
A native of Gothenburg, Andersson started playing football with Västra Frölunda IF. At the age of 15, he also made some appearances for the first team, who at the time were competing in the fourth-tier Division 2.

In 2013, Andersson moved to BK Häcken, another team in the Gothenburg area, but the first two years he spent in the youth academy. He was promoted to the first team in 2015 alongside his twin brother, Adam Andersson, and began making regular appearances in Allsvenskan. Joel and Adam, however, were not the only twins appearing for the team, given the presence of the two Gustafson's, Samuel and Simon. From the 2016 season, Joel Andersson established himself permanently as the starting right-back in the team.

=== Midtjylland ===
On 2 July 2018, Andersson signed a five-year contract with Danish Superliga club Midtjylland. He made his competitive debut for the club on 28 July, starting in a 3–1 league victory against Esbjerg fB. On 7 December, he scored his first goal for Ulvene, sealing their 3–0 win in the 89th minute by slotting home a sharp cross from Awer Mabil against OB. In the 2018–19 season, he was part of the Midtjylland team that won the Danish Cup by beating Brøndby in the final. He scored once in 30 league appearances that season, with the team finishing second in the league table.

The following season, Midtjylland won their third Danish Superliga title with Andersson scoring one goal in 31 appearances during the league campaign.

Andersson struggled with injury through the 2020–21 season, making only thirteen league appearances as the team finished in second place, one point behind eventual title winners Brøndby.

On 14 March 2022, Andersson extended his contract with Midtjylland until 2026. During the 2021–22 season, Andersson contributed to Midtjylland winning their second ever Danish Cup, making six appearances and scoring a goal on their journey to the final. In the final, he played the full duration, helping his team secure a win against OB through a penalty shootout.

Halfway through the 2022–23 season, Andersson suffered a setback in the form of a foot injury which sidelined him for the remainder of the season. On 18 July 2023, Midtjylland announced via official channels that Andersson had undergone successful foot surgery, with his return to the pitch expected no sooner than late 2023.

Andersson lost his spot in the starting lineup under head coach Thomas Thomasberg, who was appointed in March 2023. In an interview, Andersson expressed his frustration with the situation: "If I'm not even part of the match squad, there's no reason to stay. I'm 27 years old and I know my qualities."

== International career ==
Andersson made his debut for the Sweden national team on 7 January 2018 in a friendly against Estonia.

== Career statistics ==
=== Club ===
As of match played 9 September 2026

Appearances and goals by club, season and competition
Club	Season	League			Cup (Note: Includes Svenska Cupen, Danish Cup)		Europe		Total	
Club	Season	Division	Apps	Goals	Apps	Goals	Apps	Goals	Apps	Goals
BK Häcken	2015	Allsvenskan	21	2	6	1	—		27	3
BK Häcken	2016	Allsvenskan	26	0	6	0	2 (Note: Appearances in UEFA Europa League)	0	34	0
BK Häcken	2017	Allsvenskan	28	0	5	1	0	0	33	1
BK Häcken	2018	Allsvenskan	8	0	4	0	0	0	12	0
BK Häcken	Total		83	2	21	2	2	0	106	4
Midtjylland	2018–19	Superliga	30	1	3	0	4	0	37	1
Midtjylland	2019–20	Superliga	31	1	1	0	2	0	34	1
Midtjylland	2020–21	Superliga	13	0	3	0	9 (Note: Appearances in UEFA Champions League)	0	25	0
Midtjylland	2021–22	Superliga	31	1	6	1	12 (Note: Four appearances in UEFA Champions League, six appearances in UEFA Europa League, two appearances, one goal in UEFA Europa Conference League)	1	49	3
Midtjylland	2022–23	Superliga	16	0	0	0	9 (Note: Four appearances in UEFA Champions League, five appearances in UEFA Europa League)	0	25	0
Midtjylland	2023–24	Superliga	9	0	0	0	0	0	9	0
Midtjylland	2024–25	Superliga	24	1	2	0	15 (Note: Five appearances in UEFA Champions League, ten appearances in UEFA Europa League)	0	41	1
Midtjylland	Total		154	4	15	1	51	1	220	6
Ludogorets Razgrad	2025–26	First League	18	1	1 (Note: includes appearances in Bulgarian Super Cup)	0	9 (Note: Three appearances in UEFA Champions League, six appearances in UEFA Europa League)	0	28	1
Ludogorets Razgrad	2026–27	First League	7	0	0 (Note: includes appearances in Bulgarian Super Cup)	0	1 (Note: One appearance in UEFA Europa Conference League)	0	8	0
Ludogorets Razgrad	Total		25	1	1	0	10	0	36	1
Career total			262	7	37	3	63	1	362	11

=== International ===
As of 27 September 2022

Appearances and goals by national team and year
National team	Year	Apps	Goals
Sweden	2018	1	0
Sweden	2019	2	0
Sweden	2020	3	0
Sweden	2021	0	0
Sweden	2022	3	0
Total		9	0

== Honours ==
BK Häcken

- Svenska Cupen: 2015–16

Midtjylland

- Danish Superliga: 2019–20
- Danish Cup: 2018–19, 2021–22
