= Andreas Alm =

Swedish footballer and coach (born 1973)

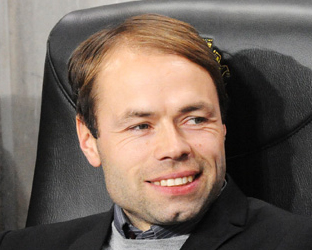
- Alm in 2013

Personal information
- Full name: Gert Andreas Alm
- Date of birth: 19 June 1973 (age 53)
- Place of birth: Gällivare, Sweden
- Height: 1.80 m (5 ft 11 in)
- Position: Striker

Youth career
- 1980–1988: IK City

Senior career*
Years	Team	Apps	(Gls)
1989–1994	IK City		
1995–1997	Hammarby	44	(15)
1998–1999	Kongsvinger	47	(16)
2000–2003	AIK	44	(20)
2004–2005	IFK Norrköping	52	(23)
2006–2007	Eskilstuna City	?	(?)
Total		154	(60)

Managerial career
- 2007–2008: Eskilstuna City
- 2011–2016: AIK
- 2016–2017: Vejle
- 2018–2021: BK Häcken
- 2021–2023: Odense
- 2024: IFK Norrköping
- 2025–2026: Liepāja
- * Club domestic league appearances and goals

Gert Andreas Alm (born 19 June 1973) is a Swedish professional football manager and former player who was most recently the head coach of Latvian Higher League club Liepāja.

He formerly managed AIK and is also a former player for the club. During his active career, he played for the two Stockholm rivals AIK and Hammarby IF in the Swedish Allsvenskan. He also played for IFK Norrköping in the Swedish Superettan and also in Norway and Kongsvinger IL for a short time.

== Commentary career ==
After his active career, he worked as a football commentator in the Swedish national channel TV4.

== Managerial career ==
=== AIK ===
On 27 November 2008, he was appointed as a new assistant manager for AIK following the departure of former assistant Nebojša Novaković earlier the same month in protest against the board’s decision to sack Rikard Norling. Together with other assistant manager Christer Swärd and manager Mikael Stahre, AIK managed to win both Allsvenskan and Svenska Cupen during their first year together.

The following year, AIK started by winning the Supercupen against the recent league runners-up IFK Göteborg. The rest of the season was however diasppointing, and Stahre left the club for Greek outfit Panionios in April 2010. Alm remained as assistant manager during caretaker Björn Wesström's stay and later appointed Alex Miller's stay. When Miller and AIK during mutual consent split up, Alm later on was appointed as AIK's new manager in December 2010. Novaković rejoined the team staff as assistant manager together with Swärd.

Alm became a successful coach for AIK and ended on the second place in both 2011 and 2013 in the Allsvenskan.

=== Vejle Boldklub ===
Alm was linked with a job at the vacant job at Brøndby IF in May 2016, but was instead presented as the new manager of Vejle Boldklub two months later.

After a disappointing season, finishing in 9th place, Alm confirmed on 30 May 2017 that he wouldn't continue as the head coach of Vejle.

=== BK Häcken ===
Alm was appointed as the head coach of BK Häcken on 8 December 2017, his second stint as coach in Allsvenskan.

=== IFK Norrköping ===
Alm signed a contract with IFK Norrköping lasting until 2026, but was sacked in December 2024 following unsatisfactory results.

== Managerial statistics ==
As of 29 August 2025

Team	Nat	From	To	Record				
Team	Nat	From	To	G	W	D	L	Win %
AIK	(Sweden)	16 December 2010	13 May 2016	196	103	42	51	52.55
Vejle Boldklub	(Denmark)	5 July 2016	30 May 2017	35	11	11	13	31.43
BK Häcken	(Sweden)	8 December 2017	31 May 2021	99	46	27	26	46.46
Odense Boldklub	(Denmark)	1 June 2021	2 November 2023	91	32	29	30	35.16
IFK Norrköping	(Sweden)	1 January 2024	9 December 2024	35	11	9	15	31.43
FK Liepāja	(Latvia)	8 May 2025	Present	19	12	2	5	63.16
Total				475	215	120	140	45.26

== Honours ==
=== Manager ===
BK Häcken

- Svenska Cupen: 2018–19
