= Gustav Isaksen =

Danish footballer (born 2001)

Personal information
- Full name: Gustav Tang Isaksen
- Date of birth: 19 April 2001 (age 25)
- Place of birth: Hjerk, Denmark
- Height: 1.78 m (5 ft 10 in)
- Position: Right winger

Team information
- Current team: Lazio
- Number: 11

Youth career
- 2004–2012: Roslev IK
- 2012–2019: Midtjylland

Senior career*
Years	Team	Apps	(Gls)
2019–2023	Midtjylland	100	(24)
2023–	Lazio	107	(16)

International career^{‡}
2016–2017	Denmark U16	4	(1)
2017–2018	Denmark U17	15	(6)
2018–2019	Denmark U18	5	(1)
2019–2020	Denmark U19	6	(1)
2020–2022	Denmark U21	19	(7)
2024–	Denmark	21	(7)
- * Club domestic league appearances and goals as of 19:36, 21 November 2026 (UTC) ‡ National team caps and goals as of 17 November 2026

Gustav Tang Isaksen (Danish pronunciation: [ˈɡus.tæw ˈiː.saɡ.sən]; born 19 April 2001) is a Danish professional footballer who plays as a forward or winger for Serie A club Lazio and the Denmark national team.

== Club career ==
Growing up in Hjerk, Salling, Isaksen began playing football at three years old. From Roslev IK, he moved to the Midtjylland academy at the under-12 level.

=== Midtjylland ===
Isaksen signed his first professional contract in May 2019, a five-year deal with FC Midtjylland. He made his debut on 25 August 2019 in the Danish Superliga when he came on as a substitute for Awer Mabil in the 78th minute of the 2–0 away win over SønderjyskE. He made his first ever start on 29 September in a 1–0 loss to OB in the league. At the end of the season, Midtjylland won the Superliga title, with Isaksen recording 15 appearances.

On 25 November 2020, Isaksen made his first European appearance, coming on as a substitute for Anders Dreyer in the 82nd minute of a 3–1 loss to Ajax in the UEFA Champions League group stage. He scored his first professional goal on 11 February 2021 in the Danish Cup quarter-final first leg against OB. Starting as a right winger, he netted the 2–1 winner.

On 20 February 2023, Isaksen scored his first hat-trick in Midtjylland's spring opener against Viborg, which ended in a 4–0 victory. He was the top scorer of the 2023–24 Danish Superliga season.

=== Lazio ===
On 8 August 2023, Isaksen was signed by Italian club Lazio. He registered his first goal for the club on 29 December 2023, scoring the second in Lazio's 3–1 Serie A victory over Frosinone, as well as providing an assist.

== International career ==
Isaksen played for various Danish national youth teams. On 4 September 2020, he made his Denmark under-21 debut in a 1–1 draw against Ukraine, coming on as a substitute for Rasmus Carstensen in the 81st minute.

He was a part of Denmark's under-21 squad for the 2021 UEFA European Under-21 Championship.

He earned his first international cap for the Denmark national team when he came on as a substitute for Anders Dreyer during Denmark's 2–0 victory over the Faroe Islands on 27 March 2024. On 15 October 2024, he scored his first international goal in a UEFA Nations League 2–2 draw against Switzerland.

== Career statistics ==
=== Club ===
As of match played 21 November 2026

Appearances and goals by club, season and competition
Club	Season	League			National cup (Note: Includes Danish Cup, Coppa Italia)		Europe		Other		Total	
Club	Season	Division	Apps	Goals	Apps	Goals	Apps	Goals	Apps	Goals	Apps	Goals
Midtjylland	2019–20	Danish Superliga	14	0	1	0	0	0	—		15	0
Midtjylland	2020–21	Danish Superliga	22	1	5	2	3 (Note: Appearances in UEFA Champions League)	0	—		30	3
Midtjylland	2021–22	Danish Superliga	30	5	6	1	10 (Note: Two appearances in UEFA Champions League, six appearances and two goals in UEFA Europa League, two appearances in UEFA Europa Conference League)	2	—		46	8
Midtjylland	2022–23	Danish Superliga	32	18	1	1	12 (Note: Four appearances in UEFA Champions League, eight appearances and three goals in UEFA Europa League)	3	—		45	22
Midtjylland	2023–24	Danish Superliga	2	0	—		1 (Note: Appearance in UEFA Europa Conference League)	0	—		3	0
Midtjylland	Total		100	24	13	4	26	5	—		139	33
Lazio	2023–24	Serie A	28	3	3	0	5	0	1 (Note: Appearance in Supercoppa Italiana)	0	37	3
Lazio	2024–25	Serie A	37	4	2	0	10 (Note: Appearances in UEFA Europa League)	2	—		49	6
Lazio	2025–26	Serie A	30	5	5	0	—		—		35	5
Lazio	2026–27	Serie A	12	4	0	0	—		0	0	12	4
Lazio	Total		107	16	10	0	15	2	1	0	133	18
Career total			207	40	23	4	41	7	1	0	272	51

=== International ===
As of match played 17 November 2026

Appearances and goals by national team and year
National team	Year	Apps	Goals
Denmark	2024	6	2
Denmark	2025	7	2
Denmark	2026	8	3
Total		21	7

As of match played 27 September 2026
Scores and results list Denmark's goal tally first, score column indicates score after each Isaksen goal.

List of international goals scored by Gustav Isaksen
No.	Date	Venue	Cap	Opponent	Score	Result	Competition
1	15 October 2024	Kybunpark, St. Gallen, Switzerland	4	Switzerland	1–1	2–2	2024–25 UEFA Nations League A
2	15 November 2024	Parken Stadium, Copenhagen, Denmark	5	Spain	1–2	1–2	2024–25 UEFA Nations League A
3	7 June 2025	Parken Stadium, Copenhagen, Denmark	9	Northern Ireland	1–1	2–1	Friendly
4	15 November 2025	Parken Stadium, Copenhagen, Denmark	12	Belarus	2–2	2–2	2026 FIFA World Cup qualification
5	26 March 2026	Parken Stadium, Copenhagen, Denmark	14	North Macedonia	2–0	4–0	2026 FIFA World Cup qualification play-off
6	26 March 2026	Parken Stadium, Copenhagen, Denmark	14	North Macedonia	3–0	4–0	2026 FIFA World Cup qualification play-off
7	27 September 2026	Parken Stadium, Copenhagen, Denmark	17	Wales	2–0	2–0	2026–27 UEFA Nations League A

== Honours ==
Midtjylland

- Danish Superliga: 2019–20
- Danish Cup: 2021–22

Individual

- Danish Superliga Golden Boot: 2022–23 (18 goals)
