= Júnior Brumado =

Brazilian footballer (born 1999)

Personal information
- Full name: José Francisco dos Santos Júnior
- Date of birth: 15 May 1999 (age 27)
- Place of birth: Brumado, Brazil
- Height: 1.90 m (6 ft 3 in)
- Position: Forward

Team information
- Current team: Midtjylland
- Number: 74

Youth career
- 2015–2017: Bahia

Senior career*
Years	Team	Apps	(Gls)
2016–2019	Bahia	25	(4)
2019–	Midtjylland	90	(15)
2020	→ Silkeborg (loan)	9	(2)
2023–2024	→ Hansa Rostock (loan)	23	(4)
2024–2025	→ Coritiba (loan)	25	(5)
- * Club domestic league appearances and goals as of 10 May 2026

José Francisco dos Santos Júnior (born 15 May 1999), known as Júnior Brumado, is a Brazilian professional footballer who plays as a striker for Danish Superliga side FC Midtjylland.

== Career ==
=== Bahia ===
Born in Brumado, Bahia, Brazil, Júnior Brumado progressed through the academy of EC Bahia. He made his Campeonato Brasileiro Série A debut on 17 July 2017 in a 1–1 draw against Avaí. On 21 April 2018, he scored his first professional goal in a league game against Santos, after coming on as a late substitute for Marco Antonio to seal the narrow 1–0 win.

With Bahia, Brumado participated in the 2018 Copa Sudamericana and contributed with a goal against Bolivian club Blooming on 24 May 2018. Bahia were knocked out in the quarter-finals by eventual winner Athletico Paranaense after a penalty shootout.

=== Midtjylland ===
On 30 January 2019, Brumado signed a five-year contract with Danish Superliga club FC Midtjylland for a fee reported to be DKK 16 million. Bahia had also secured a resale clause of 15 percent. He made his debut on 14 April in a 2–0 win over OB, coming on for Mayron George in the 77th minute.

On 31 January 2020, as part of a deal which sent Silkeborg player Ronnie Schwartz to Midtjylland, Brumado was sent to Silkeborg to replace Schwartz, on a loan deal for the rest of the season. He made his first appearance for the club on 16 February in a 2–0 home loss to AaB. His first goal for Silkeborg – as well as his first goal in the Danish league – followed on 9 March in a 2–1 win over AGF.

Ahead of the 2020–21 season, Brumado returned to Midtjylland. He scored his first goal for the club on 26 August 2020, which proved to be the winner in a 1–0 win in the UEFA Champions League qualifier against Ludogorets Razgrad.

He scored his first hat-trick on 3 October 2021, securing a 4–0 win over AGF. On 15 January 2022, he extended his contract with Midtjylland until December 2026.

==== Loan to Hansa Rostock ====
On 1 September 2023, Brumado joined German 2. Bundesliga club Hansa Rostock on a season-long loan. He made his debut for Hansa on 16 September, replacing Kai Pröger in the 67th minute of a 3–1 home loss against Fortuna Düsseldorf. On 24 September, in his second match for Die Ostseestädter, Brumado not only made his first start but also scored his debut goal for the club as they lost 3–1 to 1. FC Kaiserslautern.

On 4 May 2024, German media reported that Brumado had been kicked off the team after criticising the coach in an interview. Three days later, on 7 May 2024, it was announced that Hansa would not activate Brumado's purchase option and he returned to Midtjylland after his stay in Germany.

==== Return to Midtjylland ====
Upon his return to Midtjylland ahead of the 2024–25 season, Brumado once again criticized his coach, this time describing his relationship with manager Thomas Thomasberg as "bad" due to disagreements over his fitness levels and resulting lack of playing time. Brumado also stated, "I have told FCM [FC Midtjylland, ed.] that I don't want to be here, and their opinion is the same."

==== Loan to Coritiba ====
On 25 July 2024, Brumado was sent on another loan, this time on a one-year deal to recently relegated Brazilian Série B club Coritiba.

== Career statistics ==
As of match played 14 May 2026

Appearances and goals by club, season and competition
Club	Season	League			State league (Note: Includes Campeonato Baiano)		National cup (Note: Includes Danish Cup, DFB-Pokal)		Continental		Other		Total	
Club	Season	Division	Apps	Goals	Apps	Goals	Apps	Goals	Apps	Goals	Apps	Goals	Apps	Goals
Bahia	2017	Série A	3	0	—		—		—		—		3	0
Bahia	2018	Série A	14	1	7	3	—		1 (Note: Appearance in Copa Sudamericana)	0	2 (Note: Appearances in Copa do Nordeste)	0	22	4
Bahia	Total		17	1	7	3	—		1	0	2	0	25	4
Midtjylland	2018–19	Danish Superliga	4	0	—		0	0	—		—		4	0
Midtjylland	2019–20	Danish Superliga	17	0	—		1	0	1 (Note: Appearances in UEFA Europa League)	0	—		19	0
Midtjylland	2020–21	Danish Superliga	12	2	—		2	0	3 (Note: Appearances in UEFA Champions League)	1	—		17	3
Midtjylland	2021–22	Danish Superliga	23	8	—		4	2	10 (Note: Four appearances in UEFA Champions League, four appearances in UEFA Europa League and two appearances in UEFA Conference League)	0	—		37	10
Midtjylland	2022–23	Danish Superliga	11	0	—		0	0	1	0	1 (Note: Appearance in Danish Superliga relegation play-offs)	0	13	0
Midtjylland	2023–24	Danish Superliga	2	0	—		—		2 (Note: Appearances in UEFA Europa Conference League)	0	—		4	0
Midtjylland	2025–26	Danish Superliga	21	5	—		7	6	13	5	—		41	16
Midtjylland	Total		90	15	—		14	8	30	6	1	0	135	29
Silkeborg (loan)	2019–20	Danish Superliga	9	2	—		1	0	—		—		10	2
Hansa Rostock (loan)	2023–24	2. Bundesliga	23	4	—		1	1	—		—		24	5
Coritiba (loan)	2024	Série B	19	5	0	0	0	0	—		—		19	5
Coritiba (loan)	2025	Série B	6	0	6	2	0	0	—		—		12	2
Career total			164	27	13	5	16	9	31	6	3	0	227	47

== Honours ==
Midtjylland

- Danish Cup: 2021–22, 2025–26
