= Bo Henriksen =

Danish footballer (born 1975)

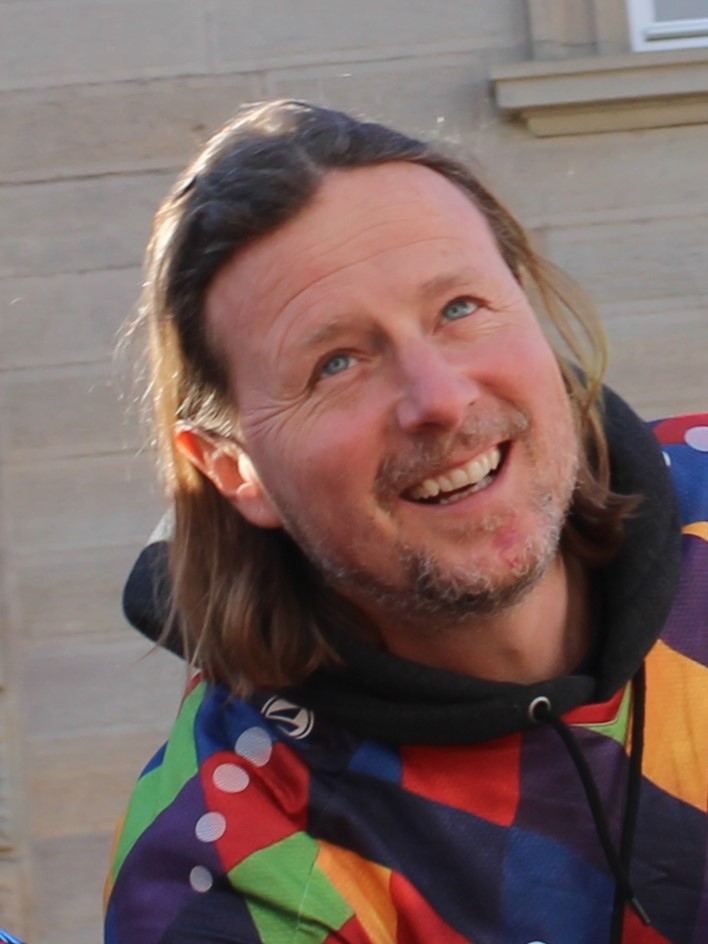

Personal information
- Date of birth: 7 February 1975 (age 51)
- Place of birth: Roskilde, Denmark
- Height: 1.78 m (5 ft 10 in)
- Position: Striker

Youth career
- OKS

Senior career*
Years	Team	Apps	(Gls)
1994–1997	OB	37	(12)
1998–2002	Herfølge	69	(14)
2001	→ Frem (loan)	3	(3)
2001–2002	→ Kidderminster Harriers (loan)	12	(5)
2002–2004	Kidderminster Harriers	72	(25)
2004	Bristol Rovers	4	(0)
2004–2005	Køge		
2005	Valur	1	(0)
2005	Fram Reykjavik	7	(4)
2005–2006	Victory		
2006	ÍBV	10	(3)
2007–2011	Brønshøj	13	(1)

Managerial career
- 2006–2014: Brønshøj
- 2014–2020: Horsens
- 2021–2022: Midtjylland
- 2022–2024: FC Zürich
- 2024–2025: Mainz 05
- * Club domestic league appearances and goals

Bo Henriksen (born 7 February 1975) is a Danish football coach and former player. He was most recently manager of Mainz 05.

Henriksen rose to prominence as a striker in both his home country, where he won the 1999–2000 Danish Superliga with Herfølge, as well as in England, where he played in the Football League with Kidderminster Harriers.

== Playing career ==
Henriksen, famed for his long locks of blonde hair began his career as a footballer with Danish team OB, whom he joined in 1994 as a youth player from OKS. Despite scoring regularly in his first three years at the club, he fell out of the starting line-up under new OB manager Roald Poulsen, but scored ten goals in five reserve team matches. He left in January 1998 to join fellow Danish Superliga club Herfølge. He became, and remained, a regular fixture in their team for the next three years, scoring 14 goals in 69 league appearances. He scored a single goal during the 1999–2000 season, in which Herfølge most surprisingly won the Danish championship.

As Herfølge struggled economically, Henriksen was loaned out to English club Kidderminster Harriers in November 2001. Henriksen first appeared for Kidderminster in a reserve-team fixture against Wigan Athletic two weeks prior to the deal being signed, and he made his official first-team debut just one day after joining the club, in a fixture against Leyton Orient. He scored a goal as a substitute in the match that Kidderminster won 3–1. He quickly became a firm favourite with the club's fans, and scored eight more times in the 2001–02 season. He was bought by Kidderminster's Danish manager Jan Mølby in a £12,500 transfer deal in February 2002.

Somewhat ironically, his career at the club only really took off after his mentor Jan Mølby parted company with the club in 2002. Henriksen will fondly be remembered in Kidderminster for breaking all kinds of records during the club's short five-year stay in the Football League. He became the first, and to date only, player to score three goals in a Football League game for the team as Kidderminster beat Exeter City 5–2 in late 2002. He ended the 2002–03 season as the club's highest-ever Football League goal scorer, with 20 goals in 41 appearances. He went on to score two goals in the first match of the following season against Mansfield Town in August 2003, but failed to score again in his Kidderminster career despite remaining one of their most popular footballers.

Affectionately known as "Bomber Bo", he left Kidderminster and joined Bristol Rovers in March 2004, and returned home to Denmark to play for Køge a few months later. Henriksen moved abroad again in June 2005, to play for Valur and Fram Reykjavik in Iceland, as well as Victory in the Maldives. He failed to agree financial terms with English non-league side Telford United in March 2006, and moved on to Icelandic club ÍBV.

== Managerial career ==
Bo Henriksen was a successful player/manager and later manager of Brønshøj from 2007, getting the club promoted to the second best league (Danish 1st Division) in 2010 and maintaining them in the top half of the league for a handful of seasons, until he left for Horsens in 2014. He managed Horsens for six years, until he left by mutual consent in August 2020.

=== Midtjylland ===
On 31 May 2021, Henriksen was named the new manager of Midtjylland, replacing Brian Priske, who led the team to the 2019–20 Danish Superliga title and had moved to a coaching position at Royal Antwerp.

Henriksen has been released of his managerial duties at Midtjylland as of 28 July 2022, according to an official statement published on Twitter. His tenure at Midtjylland included a second place in the league, only three points off winners Copenhagen and a Danish Cup win. They also competed in the Europa League group stage after losing to PSV Eindhoven in the Champions League qualifying rounds.

=== FC Zürich ===
On 10 October 2022, he was confirmed as the new head coach of FC Zürich. He signed a contract until summer 2024 with the defending Swiss champions, who found themselves at the bottom of the league after ten games played and with only four points, at the time of his Henriksen's assignment. He then transformed the team from being bottom of the league with only four points in ten games, to being one of the Swiss teams who got the most points, in addition to earning their first win in the Europa League that season following a 2–1 victory over Bodø/Glimt.

=== Mainz 05 ===
On 13 February 2024, Henriksen departed FC Zürich by mutual consent to take up the coaching position at Mainz 05, following the dismissal of Jan Siewert. He managed to lead the team to a 1–0 victory over FC Augsburg, to be their second win of the season on matchday 22 in his first match in charge. Following a heavy defeat against Bayern Munich, he guided his club to nine games without defeat including five wins, two of them in the last two matches, propelling the club from the relegation zone to 13th place.

In the 2024–25 season, Henriksen guided Mainz 05 on an impressive run, with the team climbing as high as third place by late March, firmly within the UEFA Champions League spots. However, a late-season slump saw Mainz endure a seven-match winless streak, ultimately slipping to sixth place by the end of the campaign and securing qualification for the Conference League.

Henriksen was sacked on 3 December 2025, after winning just 1 out of 12 games in the Bundesliga while losing 8 matches. He was succeeded by Mainz 05 II manager Benjamin Hoffmann as interim manager.

== Managerial statistics ==
As of 30 November 2025

Managerial record by team and tenure
Team	From	To	Record				
Team	From	To	G	W	D	L	Win %
Brønshøj	15 December 2006	26 June 2014	243	121	50	72	49.79
Horsens	26 June 2014	24 August 2020	227	82	64	81	36.12
Midtjylland	31 May 2021	28 July 2022	55	29	13	13	52.73
FC Zürich	10 October 2022	13 February 2024	55	23	19	13	41.82
Mainz 05	13 February 2024	3 December 2025	69	27	18	24	39.13
Total			649	282	164	203	43.45

== Honours ==
=== Player ===
Herfølge

- Danish Superliga: 2000

Victory

- Maldives President's Cup: 2005

Individual

- Danish Superliga Player of the Year: 2001

=== Manager ===
Midtjylland

- Danish Cup: 2021–22

Individual

- VDV Coach of the Season (Silver Bench): 2024–25
