= List of Danish football transfers summer 2017 =

This is a list of Danish football transfers in the 2017 summer transfer window by club. Only clubs in the Danish Superliga are included.

== Danish Superliga ==
=== AaB ===
In: Note: Flags indicate national team as defined under FIFA eligibility rules; some limited exceptions apply. Players may hold more than one non-FIFA nationality.

No.	Pos.	Nation	Player
1	GK	SWE	Jacob Rinne (from (Belgium) Gent)
5	DF	DEN	Jores Okore (from Copenhagen)
6	DF	DEN	Kristoffer Pallesen (from Viborg)
14	FW	SVK	Pavol Šafranko (from (Slovakia) Dunajská Streda)
22	GK	USA	Michael Lansing (from VB)
23	MF	SVK	Filip Lesniak (from (England) Tottenham Hotspur U23)
24	DF	DEN	Nikolaj Lyngø (from AaB U19)
28	MF	BRA	Yann Rolim (on loan from (Brazil) Barra)
31	DF	DEN	Mathias Andersen (from AaB U19)
40	GK	AUS	Tamati Williams (from (Netherlands) Waalwijk)

Out: Note: Flags indicate national team as defined under FIFA eligibility rules; some limited exceptions apply. Players may hold more than one non-FIFA nationality.

No.	Pos.	Nation	Player
1	GK	NED	Nicolai Larsen (to Nordsjælland)
5	DF	SWE	Markus Holgersson (to (Spain) Lorca)
7	FW	DEN	Thomas Enevoldsen (to (Netherlands) NAC Breda)
11	FW	DEN	Nicklas Helenius (to OB)
14	MF	DEN	Casper Sloth (to Silkeborg)
22	GK	AUT	Ivan Lučić (loan return to (England) Bristol City)
24	DF	DEN	Morten Rokkedal (on loan to Thisted)
29	FW	DEN	Sebastian Grønning (to Hobro)
31	GK	DEN	Joakim Mæhle (to (Belgium) Genk)

=== AGF ===
In: Note: Flags indicate national team as defined under FIFA eligibility rules; some limited exceptions apply. Players may hold more than one non-FIFA nationality.

No.	Pos.	Nation	Player
7	MF	DEN	Jakob Ankersen (from (Belgium) Zulte Waregem)
11	MF	SWE	Tobias Sana (from (Sweden) Malmö)
17	MF	BFA	Adama Guira (from (France) Lens)
20	DF	DEN	Frederik Møller (from Horsens)
21	FW	DEN	André Riel (from Helsingør)
23	DF	DEN	Pierre Kanstrup (from SønderjyskE)
33	DF	DEN	Daniel Thøgersen (from AGF Youth)
37	DF	DEN	Sebastian Hausner (from AGF Youth)

Out: Note: Flags indicate national team as defined under FIFA eligibility rules; some limited exceptions apply. Players may hold more than one non-FIFA nationality.

No.	Pos.	Nation	Player
6	MF	ISL	Björn Daníel Sverrisson (on loan to VB)
11	MF	DEN	Danny Olsen (to Hobro)
16	MF	AUS	Chris Ikonomidis (loan return to (Italy) Lazio)
17	DF	DEN	Oskar Buur (to Brabrand)
20	MF	ISL	Elmar Bjarnason (to (Turkey) Elazığspor)
21	DF	DEN	Thomas Juel-Nielsen (to (Israel) Maccabi Netanya)
24	DF	DEN	Emil Christensen (released)
28	DF	RUS	Dzhamaldin Khodzhaniyazov (released)
31	GK	DEN	Thomas Hagelskjær (to VB)

=== Brøndby ===
In: Note: Flags indicate national team as defined under FIFA eligibility rules; some limited exceptions apply. Players may hold more than one non-FIFA nationality.

No.	Pos.	Nation	Player
3	DF	GER	Anthony Jung (on loan from (Germany) RB Leipzig)
8	MF	DEN	Kasper Fisker (from Randers)
10	MF	GER	Hany Mukhtar (from (Portugal) Benfica, previously on loan)
12	MF	SWE	Simon Tibbling (from (Netherlands) Groningen)
16	GK	GER	Benjamin Bellot (from (Germany) Leipzig II)
18	MF	KOS	Besar Halimi (on loan from (Germany) Mainz 05)
21	MF	DEN	Lasse Vigen Christensen (from (England) Fulham)
25	DF	DEN	Gregers Arndal-Lauritzen (from Brøndby U19)
26	MF	SVK	Filip Blažek (from (Slovakia) Senica)
28	DF	DEN	Mads Juel Andersen (loan return from Køge)

Out: Note: Flags indicate national team as defined under FIFA eligibility rules; some limited exceptions apply. Players may hold more than one non-FIFA nationality.

No.	Pos.	Nation	Player
5	DF	SVN	Gregor Sikošek (on loan to Silkeborg)
7	MF	DEN	Thomas Kahlenberg (released)
8	MF	JAM	Rodolph Austin (to Esbjerg)
11	MF	HUN	Zsolt Kalmár (loan return to (Germany) RB Leipzig)
12	MF	DEN	Frederik Holst (to (Netherlands) Sparta Rotterdam)
16	GK	GHA	Adam Larsen Kwarasey (to (Norway) Vålerenga)
17	MF	DEN	Rezan Corlu (to (Italy) Roma)
18	MF	RSA	Lebogang Phiri (to (France) Guingamp)
22	FW	SWE	Gustaf Nilsson (on loan to Silkeborg)
24	DF	DEN	Joel Kabongo (on loan to Fremad Amager)
30	GK	DEN	Viktor Anker (on loan to Næstved)

=== Copenhagen ===
In: Note: Flags indicate national team as defined under FIFA eligibility rules; some limited exceptions apply. Players may hold more than one non-FIFA nationality.

No.	Pos.	Nation	Player
3	DF	SWE	Pierre Bengtsson (from (Germany) Mainz 05)
10	MF	GRE	Zeca (from (Greece) Panathinaikos)
18	DF	DEN	Mads Roerslev (from Copenhagen U19)
19	DF	SVK	Denis Vavro (from (Slovakia) Žilina)
23	FW	AUT	Martin Pušić (from Midtjylland)
26	FW	DEN	Carlo Holse (from Copenhagen U19)
27	DF	CZE	Michael Lüftner (from (Czech Republic) Slavia Prague)
28	FW	CYP	Pieros Sotiriou (from (Cyprus) APOEL)

Out: Note: Flags indicate national team as defined under FIFA eligibility rules; some limited exceptions apply. Players may hold more than one non-FIFA nationality.

No.	Pos.	Nation	Player
3	DF	SWE	Ludwig Augustinsson (to (Germany) Werder Bremen)
9	FW	DEN	Bashkim Kadrii (on loan to Randers)
11	FW	DEN	Andreas Cornelius (to (Italy) Atalanta)
25	DF	DEN	Mathias Jørgensen (to (England) Huddersfield Town)
26	DF	DEN	Jores Okore (to AaB)
34	DF	DEN	Frederik Bay (to Helsingør, previously on loan)
37	FW	NOR	Julian Kristoffersen (to (Sweden) Djurgården)

=== Helsingør ===
In: Note: Flags indicate national team as defined under FIFA eligibility rules; some limited exceptions apply. Players may hold more than one non-FIFA nationality.

No.	Pos.	Nation	Player
3	DF	DEN	Frederik Bay (from Copenhagen, previously on loan)
11	FW	DEN	Nicolas Mortensen (from Fremad Amager)
12	FW	DEN	Mark Leth Pedersen (from Roskilde)
14	DF	DEN	Jonas Henriksen (from AB)
15	DF	DEN	Daniel Jørgensen (from Roskilde)
16	MF	DEN	Christian Køhler (from Nordsjælland)
18	MF	DEN	Ismail Esen (from Helsingør U19)
19	FW	DEN	Daniel Stückler (from Køge)
23	MF	DEN	Frederik Roepstorff (from Helsingør U19)
25	FW	DEN	Adnan Mohammad (from Arendal)
31	GK	DEN	Adrian Kappenberger (from Fredensborg)
33	DF	DEN	Søren Henriksen (from Vendsyssel)
--	FW	SWE	Måns Herrmann (from (Sweden) Höganäs)
--	MF	SWE	William Kvist (free agent)
--	FW	BRA	Matheus Leiria (from (Brazil) Barra)
--	FW	DEN	Osama Akharraz (from Viborg)

Out: Note: Flags indicate national team as defined under FIFA eligibility rules; some limited exceptions apply. Players may hold more than one non-FIFA nationality.

No.	Pos.	Nation	Player
4	DF	DEN	Rasmus Minor Petersen (to Hobro)
9	FW	DEN	André Riel (to AGF)
10	MF	DEN	Mads Aaquist (to Nordsjælland)
11	FW	DEN	Martin Koch (to Køge)
14	MF	DEN	Vito Hammershøy-Mistrati (to Hobro)
15	MF	DEN	Rasmus Gasberg (to Stenløse)
18	MF	DEN	Morten Bertolt (retired)
19	FW	DEN	Pierre Larsen (on loan to Viborg)
28	MF	DEN	Lukas Svendsen (to Fredensborg BI)

=== Hobro ===
In: Note: Flags indicate national team as defined under FIFA eligibility rules; some limited exceptions apply. Players may hold more than one non-FIFA nationality.

No.	Pos.	Nation	Player
7	MF	DEN	Vito Hammershøy-Mistrati (from Helsingør)
9	MF	DEN	Danny Olsen (from AGF)
16	GK	DEN	Nicolaj Jørgensen (from AaB U19)
17	FW	DEN	Edgar Babayan (from Randers, previously on loan)
19	DF	DEN	Honoré Kalala (from Hobro U19)
23	FW	USA	Emmanuel Chabbi (from (Spain) Las Palmas Atlético)
24	DF	DEN	Rasmus Minor Petersen (from Helsingør)
27	DF	DEN	Mathias Haarup (from Brabrand)
29	FW	DEN	Sebastian Grønning (from AaB)

Out: Note: Flags indicate national team as defined under FIFA eligibility rules; some limited exceptions apply. Players may hold more than one non-FIFA nationality.

No.	Pos.	Nation	Player
2	FW	DEN	Anders Holvad (to Fredericia)
7	MF	DEN	Sebastian Andersen (to Fremad Amager)
9	FW	DEN	Lucas Jensen (to Vendsyssel)
11	MF	DEN	Mads Schäfer Bak (to Brabrand)
16	GK	DEN	Alexander Nybo (to Fredericia)
17	DF	DEN	Rune Hastrup (retired)
23	DF	USA	Babajide Ogunbiyi (retired)
25	MF	DEN	Kasper Povlsen (to Vendsyssel)

=== Horsens ===
In: Note: Flags indicate national team as defined under FIFA eligibility rules; some limited exceptions apply. Players may hold more than one non-FIFA nationality.

No.	Pos.	Nation	Player
1	GK	FIN	Jesse Joronen (from (England) Fulham)
4	MF	DEN	Simon Okosun (from Vendsyssel)
6	DF	PHI	Daisuke Sato (from (Romania) Politehnica Iași)
8	MF	DEN	Bjarke Jacobsen (from Vendsyssel)
14	FW	DEN	Mads Døhr Thychosen (on loan from Midtjylland)
19	FW	DEN	Tobias Arndal (from Tarup-Paarup)
23	FW	DEN	Oliver Drost (on loan from VB)
24	MF	DEN	Nicolai Dohn (from Horsens U19)
27	DF	DEN	Jonas Thorsen (from Viborg)
33	DF	DEN	Alexander Ludwig (from Køge)
40	GK	DEN	Frederik Nørgaard (from VB U19)

Out: Note: Flags indicate national team as defined under FIFA eligibility rules; some limited exceptions apply. Players may hold more than one non-FIFA nationality.

No.	Pos.	Nation	Player
1	GK	DEN	Nicklas Dannevang (to Fremad Amager)
2	DF	ISL	Elfar Freyr Helgason (loan return to (Iceland) Breiðablik)
4	MF	USA	Conor O'Brien (to (Norway) Start)
5	DF	DEN	Frederik Møller (to AGF)
8	MF	DEN	Mikkel Jespersen (to Viborg)
14	MF	DEN	Jonas Gemmer (loan return to Nordsjælland)
19	FW	DEN	Kim Aabech (to Hvidovre)
21	GK	USA	Steve Clark (to (United States) D.C. United)
22	DF	DEN	Mads Bech Sørensen (to (England) Brentford B)
29	FW	DEN	André Bjerregaard (to (Iceland) KR)

=== Lyngby ===
In: Note: Flags indicate national team as defined under FIFA eligibility rules; some limited exceptions apply. Players may hold more than one non-FIFA nationality.

No.	Pos.	Nation	Player
1	GK	DEN	Mikkel Andersen (from Midtjylland)
6	MF	DEN	Mathias Hebo (from Fredericia)
8	MF	KOS	Herolind Shala (from (Czech Republic) Sparta Prague)
12	FW	CRC	Mayron George (on loan from Randers)
18	DF	DEN	Kevin Tshiembe (from Lyngby U19)
26	FW	DEN	Gustav Marcussen (from Lyngby U19)
28	MF	DEN	Oliver Kjærgaard (from Lyngby U19)
40	GK	DEN	Oskar Snorre (from Lyngby U19)
48	DF	DEN	Oliver Lund (from OB)

Out: Note: Flags indicate national team as defined under FIFA eligibility rules; some limited exceptions apply. Players may hold more than one non-FIFA nationality.

No.	Pos.	Nation	Player
1	GK	DEN	Jesper Hansen (to Midtjylland)
8	FW	DEN	Lasse Rise (to (Iceland) Keflavík)
11	FW	DEN	Danilo Arrieta (to Viborg)
13	DF	DEN	Alexander Munksgaard (loan return to Midtjylland)
23	FW	DEN	Jens Odgaard (to (Italy) Internazionale)
28	FW	DEN	Emil Larsen (retired)

=== Midtjylland ===
In: Note: Flags indicate national team as defined under FIFA eligibility rules; some limited exceptions apply. Players may hold more than one non-FIFA nationality.

No.	Pos.	Nation	Player
1	GK	DEN	Jesper Hansen (from Lyngby)
4	DF	HUN	Zsolt Korcsmár (from (Hungary) Vasas)
15	MF	BUL	Bozhidar Kraev (from (Bulgaria) Levski Sofia)
19	FW	NOR	Alexander Sørloth (from (Netherlands) Groningen)
29	MF	DEN	Frederik Brandhof (from Skive)
31	GK	DEN	Michael Falkesgaard (from OB)
88	FW	NOR	Gustav Wikheim (from (Belgium) Gent, previously on loan)

Out: Note: Flags indicate national team as defined under FIFA eligibility rules; some limited exceptions apply. Players may hold more than one non-FIFA nationality.

No.	Pos.	Nation	Player
10	FW	AUT	Martin Pušić (to Copenhagen)
16	GK	SWE	Johan Dahlin (to (Sweden) Malmö)
18	DF	DEN	Kristian Riis (on loan to Vendsyssel)
19	MF	DEN	Marco Larsen (released)
21	MF	FIN	Kaan Kairinen (on loan to Skive)
24	FW	DEN	Mads Døhr Thychosen (on loan to Horsens)
29	MF	DEN	Frederik Brandhof (on loan to Skive)
30	GK	DEN	Andreas Raahauge (to Skive)
31	GK	DEN	Mikkel Andersen (to Lyngby)
34	MF	DEN	Mikael Anderson (on loan to Vendsyssel)
45	FW	AUS	Awer Mabil (on loan to (Portugal) Paços de Ferreira)
77	FW	BRA	Bruninho (loan return to (China) Guangzhou R&F)
--	FW	FRO	Jákup Thomsen (on loan to Thisted)
--	MF	COD	Gloire Rutikanga (on loan to Ringkøbing)
--	MF	DEN	Nikolaj Kirk (on loan to (England) Brentford B)
--	MF	DEN	Jonas Gemmer (to Fremad Amager)

=== Nordsjælland ===
In: Note: Flags indicate national team as defined under FIFA eligibility rules; some limited exceptions apply. Players may hold more than one non-FIFA nationality.

No.	Pos.	Nation	Player
15	MF	DEN	Mads Aaquist (from Helsingør)
16	DF	DEN	Benjamin Hansen (from Fredericia)
18	GK	DEN	Nicolai Larsen (from AaB)
25	DF	DEN	Emil Damgaard (from Nordsjælland U19)
33	MF	GHA	Collins Tanor (from (England) Manchester City U18, previously on loan)
34	FW	DEN	Martin Frese (from Nordsjælland U19)

Out: Note: Flags indicate national team as defined under FIFA eligibility rules; some limited exceptions apply. Players may hold more than one non-FIFA nationality.

No.	Pos.	Nation	Player
1	GK	SWE	Patrik Carlgren (to (Turkey) Konyaspor)
4	DF	DEN	Andreas Maxsø (to (Turkey) Osmanlıspor)
7	MF	SVK	Stanislav Lobotka (to (Spain) Celta)
19	FW	DEN	Marcus Ingvartsen (to (Belgium) Genk)
21	GK	NED	Indy Groothuizen (loan return to (Netherlands) Jong Ajax)
24	MF	DEN	Christian Køhler (to Helsingør)
27	FW	TUN	Souheib Dhaflaoui (to Næstved)

=== OB ===
In: Note: Flags indicate national team as defined under FIFA eligibility rules; some limited exceptions apply. Players may hold more than one non-FIFA nationality.

No.	Pos.	Nation	Player
1	GK	DEN	Thomas Mikkelsen (from Fredericia)
16	MF	DEN	Julius Eskesen (from OB U19)
25	FW	DEN	Nicklas Helenius (from AaB)
27	GK	DEN	Oliver Christensen (from OB U19)

Out: Note: Flags indicate national team as defined under FIFA eligibility rules; some limited exceptions apply. Players may hold more than one non-FIFA nationality.

No.	Pos.	Nation	Player
1	GK	DEN	Michael Falkesgaard (to Midtjylland)
23	FW	DEN	Thomas Mikkelsen (to (Scotland) Ross County)
24	DF	DEN	Oliver Lund (to Lyngby)
26	MF	CIV	Yao Dieudonne (on loan to Vendsyssel)

=== Randers ===
In: Note: Flags indicate national team as defined under FIFA eligibility rules; some limited exceptions apply. Players may hold more than one non-FIFA nationality.

No.	Pos.	Nation	Player
9	FW	DEN	Bashkim Kadrii (on loan from Copenhagen)
15	MF	USA	Perry Kitchen (from (Scotland) Heart of Midlothian)
17	DF	DEN	Kevin Conboy (from (Netherlands) Utrecht)
23	FW	GEO	Saba Lobzhanidze (from (Georgia (country)) Dinamo Tbilisi)
25	GK	DEN	Jonas Dakir (from Randers Freja)
30	FW	SEN	Ibrahima N'Diaye (from (Serbia) Napredak Kruševac)
93	MF	MNE	Vladimir Rodić (from (Turkey) Karabükspor)

Out: Note: Flags indicate national team as defined under FIFA eligibility rules; some limited exceptions apply. Players may hold more than one non-FIFA nationality.

No.	Pos.	Nation	Player
7	FW	DEN	Edgar Babayan (to Hobro, previously on loan)
9	FW	CRC	Mayron George (on loan to Lyngby)
13	DF	DEN	Mads Fenger (to (Sweden) Hammarby)
15	FW	SWE	Sam Lundholm (loan return to (Netherlands) NEC)
16	MF	DEN	Kasper Fisker (to Brøndby)
19	MF	DEN	Mikkel Kallesøe (on loan to Viborg)
21	DF	DEN	Alexander Fischer (to Viborg)
23	FW	SWE	Viktor Lundberg (to (Portugal) Marítimo)
38	MF	DEN	Nicolai Poulsen (on loan to (Norway) Sarpsborg 08)

=== Silkeborg ===
In: Note: Flags indicate national team as defined under FIFA eligibility rules; some limited exceptions apply. Players may hold more than one non-FIFA nationality.

No.	Pos.	Nation	Player
9	FW	SWE	Gustaf Nilsson (on loan from Brøndby)
11	FW	BRA	Alex (from (Mexico) Celaya)
16	GK	DEN	Peter Friis Jensen (from Viborg)
17	MF	DEN	Casper Sloth (from AaB)
20	FW	DEN	Marc Rochester Sørensen (from Køge)
25	DF	SVN	Gregor Sikošek (on loan from Brøndby)
26	FW	GEO	Mate Vatsadze (from Viborg)

Out: Note: Flags indicate national team as defined under FIFA eligibility rules; some limited exceptions apply. Players may hold more than one non-FIFA nationality.

No.	Pos.	Nation	Player
7	FW	DEN	Nicolaj Agger (to Hvidovre)
9	FW	DEN	Andreas Albers (to Viborg)
10	MF	DEN	Emil Scheel (to SønderjyskE)
11	FW	DEN	Nicklas Helenius (loan return to AaB)
20	FW	USA	Rubio Rubin (to (Norway) Stabæk)
31	GK	DEN	Jens Rinke (to Kolding)

=== SønderjyskE ===
In: Note: Flags indicate national team as defined under FIFA eligibility rules; some limited exceptions apply. Players may hold more than one non-FIFA nationality.

No.	Pos.	Nation	Player
10	MF	DEN	Emil Scheel (from Silkeborg)
20	DF	DEN	Stefan Gartenmann (from (Netherlands) Heerenveen)
24	MF	DEN	Rasmus Vinderslev (from SønderjyskE U19)
25	MF	DEN	Niki Zimling (from (Germany) Mainz 05)
27	FW	DEN	Mads Hvilsom (on loan from Esbjerg)
28	GK	GER	Sebastian Mielitz (from (Germany) Greuther Fürth)
29	MF	CMR	Victor Ekani (from (Cameroon) Fortuna)
32	FW	CMR	William Tchuameni (from (Portugal) Feirense)

Out: Note: Flags indicate national team as defined under FIFA eligibility rules; some limited exceptions apply. Players may hold more than one non-FIFA nationality.

No.	Pos.	Nation	Player
1	GK	CRO	Marin Skender (released)
10	MF	DEN	Nicolaj Madsen (to VB)
11	FW	DEN	Johan Absalonsen (to (Australia) Adelaide United)
18	DF	DEN	Nicholas Marfelt (on loan to (Netherlands) Sparta Rotterdam)
23	FW	ZIM	Silas Songani (on loan to (Norway) Elverum)
26	DF	DEN	Pierre Kanstrup (to AGF)
31	DF	AUT	Matthias Maak (to (Austria) Wacker Innsbruck)
