= 2016–17 Lyngby Boldklub season =

Danish football club season

Lyngby Boldklub (Danish pronunciation: [ˈlyːŋby]) is a professional Danish football club founded in 1921. It is based at Lyngby Stadion in Kongens Lyngby, Denmark.During the 2016/17 campaign they will be competing in the following competitions:Superliga, DBU Pokalen.

== Competitions ==
=== Results summary ===
Overall								Home						Away					
Pld	W	D	L	GF	GA	GD	Pts	W	D	L	GF	GA	GD	W	D	L	GF	GA	GD
36	17	7	12	42	35	+7	58	8	5	5	19	14	+5	9	2	7	23	21	+2

Last updated: 28 May 2017.

=== Results by matchday ===
Matchday	1	2	3	4	5	6	7	8	9	10	11	12	13	14	15	16	17	18	19	20	21	22	23	24	25	26	27	28	29	30	31	32	33	34	35	36
Ground	A	H	A	A	H	A	H	A	H	H	A	H	A	H	H	A	H	H	A	A	H	A	H	A	H	A	A	H	H	A	A	H	H	A	H	A
Result	L	D	W	W	D	L	L	L	W	W	W	W	D	W	L	W	L	L	W	L	D	W	D	D	W	L	L	L	D	W	L	W	W	W	W	W
Position	6	6	4	4	4	6	6	6	4	4	3	3	3	3	4	4	6	6	4	4	3	3	4	4	3	3	3	3	5	5	4	4	3	3	3	3

Updated to match(es) played on 28 May 2017. Source:
A = Away; H = Home; W = Win; D = Draw; L = Loss

== Matches ==
16 July 2016 Match 1	Copenhagen	3 - 0	Lyngby	Copenhagen
18:30	Verbič (yellow card) 15' (goal) 52'; Toutouh 33'; Delaney 55' (yellow card) 64'	Report	Ørnskov (yellow card) 39'; Fosgaard (yellow card) 83'	Stadium: Telia Parken; Attendance: 9,953; Referee: (Denmark) Michael Tykgaard

24 July 2016 Match 2	Lyngby	2 - 2	Odense	Lyngby
14:00	Rasmussen (yellow card) 8'; Kjær 43' (yellow card) 48' (goal) 52'	Report	Petersen 8' (pen.) (yellow card) 43' (yellow-red card); Festersen 38' (yellow card) 46'; Desler (yellow card) 78'	Stadium: Lyngby Stadium; Attendance: 2,006; Referee: (Denmark) Jorgen Burchardt

31 July 2016 Match 3	SønderjyskE	0 - 1	Lyngby	Haderslev
12:00	Guira (yellow card) 47'; Drachmann (yellow card) 90'	Report	Ørnskov (yellow card) 57'; Jensen 64'	Stadium: Sydbank Park; Attendance: 4,494; Referee: (Denmark) Lars Christoffersen

5 August 2016 Match 4	Silkeborg	0 - 4	Lyngby	Silkeborg
20:15	Thomsen (yellow card) 52'	Report	Christjansen 18'; Larsen 24'; Kjær 70'; Fosgaard 80'	Stadium: Mascot Park; Attendance: 2,220; Referee: (Denmark) Peter Larsen

12 August 2016 Match 5	Lyngby	0 - 0	AGF	Lyngby
20:15	Sørensen (yellow card) 66'	Report	Bjarnason (yellow card) 33'; Junker (yellow card) 40'; Soares (yellow card) 70'; Mikanović (yellow card) 79'	Stadium: Lyngby Stadium; Attendance: 2,463; Referee: (Denmark) Jens Maae

19 August 2016 Match 6	Horsens	2 - 1	Lyngby	Horsens
20:15	Aabech 5'; Møller (yellow card) 52'; Finnbogason 90'	Report	Jensen 6'; Brandrup (yellow card) 29'	Stadium: CASA Arena Horsens; Attendance: 1,663; Referee: (Denmark) Peter Rasmussen (referee)

26 August 2016 Match 7	Lyngby	0 - 1	Nordsjælland	Lyngby
20:15	Kjær (yellow card) 13'; Larsen (yellow card) 17'; Rasmussen (yellow card) 72'	Report	Ingvartsen 40'; Køhler (yellow card) 68'; Lund (yellow card) 68'; Gregor (yellow card) 81'	Stadium: Lyngby Stadium; Attendance: 2,314; Referee: (Denmark) Morten Krogh

9 September 2016 Match 8	Randers	2 - 0	Lyngby	Randers
18:00	Marxen 27'; Ishak 43' (yellow card) 52'; Kauko (yellow card) 44'; Fenger (red card) 70'	Report	Kjær (yellow card) 44'; Rasmussen (yellow card) 63'; Jensen (yellow card) 72'	Stadium: BioNutria Park Randers; Attendance: 4,128; Referee: (Denmark) Jens Maae
