= 2023–24 FC Midtjylland season =

FC Midtjylland
2023–24 season
- Owner: Anders Holch Povlsen
- Chairman: Cliff Crown
- Manager: Thomas Thomasberg
- Stadium: MCH Arena
- Superliga: 1st (champions)
- Danish Cup: Fourth round
- UEFA Europa Conference League: Play-off round
- Top goalscorer: League: Cho Gue-sung (12); All: Franculino Djú (17)
- Highest home attendance: 11,861 (5 May 2024 vs. Brøndby)
- Lowest home attendance: 6,609 (26 July 2023 vs Progrès)
- Average home league attendance: 9,950 (26 May 2024)
- Biggest win: 13–0 (6 September 2023 vs Aabenraa)
- Biggest defeat: 1–4 (6 August 2023 vs Lyngby); 0–3 (27 August 2023 vs Nordsjælland)
Home colours	Away colours
- All statistics correct as of 26 May 2024.

The 2023–24 season is FC Midtjylland's 25th season in existence, and its 23rd consecutive season in the Danish Superliga, the top tier of football in Denmark. As a result of the club's seventh-place finish and playoff win during the 2022–23 Danish Superliga, it participated in the 2023–24 UEFA Europa Conference League and will also compete in the 2023–24 Danish Cup. Midtjylland finished the 2023–24 season on top of the Danish Superliga, earning the club's fourth league title and qualified for the 2024–25 UEFA Champions League.

== Squad ==
As of 1 February 2024

No.	Name	Nat	Position	Since	Date of birth	Signed from
Goalkeepers
1	Jonas Lössl	(Denmark)	GK	2021	1 February 1989	(England) Everton F.C.
50	Martin Fraisl	(Austria)	GK	2023	10 May 1993	(Germany) Arminia Bielefeld
90	Oscar Hedvall	(Denmark)	GK	2023	9 August 1998	(Denmark) Silkeborg
Defenders
3	Lee Han-beom	(South Korea)	DF	2023	17 June 2002	(South Korea) FC Seoul
6	Joel Andersson	(Sweden)	DF	2018	11 November 1996	(Sweden) BK Häcken
13	Adam Gabriel	(Czech Republic)	DF	2023	28 May 2001	(Czech Republic) Sparta Prague
14	Henrik Dalsgaard (captain)	(Denmark)	DF	2021	27 July 1989	(England) Brentford F.C.
15	Sverrir Ingi Ingason	(Iceland)	DF	2023	5 August 1993	(Greece) PAOK
22	Mads Bech Sørensen	(Denmark)	DF	2023	7 January 1999	(England) Brentford
29	Paulinho	(Brazil)	DF	2019	3 January 1995	(Brazil) Bahia
73	Juninho	(Brazil)	DF	2021	1 February 1995	(Brazil) Esporte Clube Bahia
Midfielders
2	André Rømer	(Denmark)	MF	2023	18 July 1993	(Sweden) Elfsborg
5	Emiliano Martínez	(Uruguay)	MF	2022	17 August 1999	(Brazil) Red Bull Bragantino
8	Kristoffer Olsson	(Sweden)	MF	2023	30 June 1995	(Belgium) Anderlecht
24	Oliver Sørensen	(Denmark)	MF	2019	10 March 2022	(Denmark) Homegrown
25	Iver Fossum	(Norway)	MF	2023	15 July 1996	(Denmark) AaB
35	Charles	(Brazil)	MF	2021	19 June 1996	(Brazil) Ceará
37	Armin Gigović	(Bosnia and Herzegovina)	MF	2023	6 April 2002	(Russia) Rostov
Forwards
9	Ola Brynhildsen	(Norway)	FW	2022	27 April 1999	(Norway) Molde
10	Cho Gue-sung	(South Korea)	FW	2023	25 January 1998	(South Korea) Jeonbuk Hyundai Motors
11	Darío Osorio	(Chile)	FW	2023	24 January 2004	Club Universidad de Chile
17	Franculino Djú	(Guinea-Bissau)	FW	2023	28 June 2004	(Portugal) Benfica U23
18	Edward Chilufya	(Zambia)	FW	2022	17 September 1999	(Sweden) Djurgårdens IF
38	Marrony	(Brazil)	FW	2021	5 February 1999	(Brazil) Atlético Mineiro
45	Alhaji Kamara	(Sierra Leone)	FW	2024	16 April 1994	(Denmark) Randers
58	Aral Şimşir	(Denmark)	FW	2021	19 June 2022	(Denmark) Homegrown

=== Out on loan ===
Note: Flags indicate national team as defined under FIFA eligibility rules; some limited exceptions apply. Players may hold more than one non-FIFA nationality.

No.	Pos.	Nation	Player
—	GK	DEN	Valdemar Birksø (at Fredericia until 30 June 2024)
—	DF	DEN	Mikkel Fischer (at Fredericia until 30 June 2024)
—	GK	ISL	Elías Rafn Ólafsson (at Mafra until 30 June 2024)
—	FW	DEN	August Priske (at FC Eindhoven until 30 June 2024)
—	DF	DEN	Pontus Texel (at Mafra until 30 June 2024)
—	MF	DEN	Andreas Nibe (at Mafra until 30 June 2024)

No.	Pos.	Nation	Player
—	FW	COL	Juan Felipe Moreno (at Mafra until 30 June 2024)
—	FW	DEN	Frederik Heiselberg (at Horsens until 30 June 2024)
—	MF	DEN	Jonathan Lind (at Mafra until 30 June 2024)
—	DF	DEN	Stefan Gartenmann (at Aberdeen until 30 June 2024)
—	DF	COL	Pablo Ortíz (at Pardubice until 30 June 2024)

== Transfers ==
=== In ===
Date	Pos.	Nat.	Name	Club	Fee	Ref.
1 July 2023	GK	(Denmark)	Oscar Hedvall	(Denmark) Silkeborg	Free Transfer	
1 July 2023	FW	(Guinea-Bissau)	Franculino Djú	(Portugal) Benfica U23	Free Transfer	
1 July 2023	FW	(Denmark)	August Priske	(Denmark) Midtjylland U19	Internal Transfer	
3 July 2023	MF	(Sweden)	Kristoffer Olsson	(Belgium) Anderlecht	€2.80m	
7 July 2023	DF	(Iceland)	Sverrir Ingi Ingason	(Greece) PAOK	€3.00m	
10 July 2023	DF	(Norway)	Iver Fossum	(Denmark) AaB	Free Transfer	
11 July 2023	FW	(South Korea)	Cho Gue-sung	(South Korea) Jeonbuk Hyundai Motors	€3.05m	
14 July 2023	DF	(Denmark)	André Rømer	(Sweden) Elfsborg	Unknown	
2 August 2023	GK	(Austria)	Martin Fraisl	(Germany) Arminia Bielefeld	Free Transfer	
23 August 2023	DF	(Czech Republic)	Adam Gabriel	(Czech Republic) Sparta Prague	€830k	
28 August 2023	DF	(South Korea)	Lee Han-beom	(South Korea) FC Seoul	€1.50m	
31 August 2023	FW	(Chile)	Darío Osorio	Universidad de Chile	€5.20m	
1 September 2023	DF	(Denmark)	Mads Bech Sørensen	(England) Brentford	Undisclosed	
1 September 2023	FW	(Norway)	Ola Brynhildsen	(Norway) Molde	€2.50m	
1 February 2024	FW	(Sierra Leone)	Alhaji Kamara	(Denmark) Randers	€125k	

=== Out ===
Date	Pos.	Nat.	Name	Club	Fee	Ref.
1 July 2023	DF	(Denmark)	Mads Døhr Thychosen	(Sweden) AIK	€70k	
18 July 2023	MF	(Egypt)	Emam Ashour	(Egypt) Al Ahly	€2.68m	
31 July 2023	DF	(Denmark)	Oliver Olsen	(Denmark) Randers	Undisclosed	
8 August 2023	FW	(Denmark)	Gustav Isaksen	(Italy) Lazio	€12.00m	
17 August 2023	FW	(Guinea)	Sory Kaba	(Spain) Las Palmas	€1.50m	
14 September 2023	FW	(Denmark) (South Sudan)	Pione Sisto	(Turkey) Alanyaspor	Undisclosed	
31 January 2024	MF	(Denmark)	Nikolas Dyhr	(United States) St. Louis City	€500k	

=== Loans out ===
Date	Pos.	Nat.	Name	Club	Duration	Ref.
2 July 2023	DF	(Denmark)	Mikkel Fischer	(Denmark) Fredericia	30 June 2024	
18 July 2023	GK	(Iceland)	Elías Rafn Ólafsson	(Portugal) Mafra	30 June 2024	
18 July 2023	DF	(Denmark)	Pontus Texel	(Portugal) Mafra	30 June 2024	
18 July 2023	MF	(Denmark)	Andreas Nibe	(Portugal) Mafra	30 June 2024	
18 July 2023	FW	(Colombia)	Juan Felipe Moreno	(Portugal) Mafra	30 June 2024	
21 July 2023	FW	(Denmark)	Frederik Heiselberg	(Denmark) Horsens	30 June 2024	
26 July 2023	MF	(Denmark)	Gustav Fraulo	(Portugal) Mafra	29 January 2024	
26 July 2023	FW	(Denmark)	Jonathan Lind	(Portugal) Mafra	30 June 2024	
30 July 2023	MF	(Denmark)	Valdemar Byskov	(Portugal) Mafra	3 January 2024	
3 August 2023	DF	(Denmark)	Victor Bak Jensen	(Portugal) Mafra	3 January 2024	
22 August 2023	FW	(Denmark)	August Priske	(Netherlands) FC Eindhoven	30 June 2024	
1 September 2023	GK	(Nigeria)	Mark Ugboh	(Denmark) Holstebro	30 June 2024	
1 September 2023	DF	(Denmark)	Stefan Gartenmann	(Scotland) Aberdeen	30 June 2024	
1 September 2023	FW	(Brazil)	Júnior Brumado	(Germany) Hansa Rostock	30 June 2024	
7 September 2023	DF	(Colombia)	Pablo Ortíz	(Czech Republic) Pardubice	30 June 2024	

=== Released ===
Date	Pos.	Nat.	Name	Subsequent club	Join date	Ref.

=== New contracts ===
Date	Pos.	Nat.	Name	Contract until	Team	Ref.
29 June 2023	FW	(Turkey) (Denmark)	Aral Şimşir	30 June 2028	First Team	
22 August 2023	FW	(Denmark)	August Priske	30 June 2028	First Team	

== Non-competitive ==
=== Pre-season friendlies ===
7 July 2023 Friendly	Midtjylland	1–2	AaB	Ikast
TBD	Franculino 82'	Report	Bakiz 10'; Andersen 12'	Stadium: Wunderelf Arena

16 July 2023 Friendly	AGF	2–3	Midtjylland	Herning
TBD	Mortensen 22', 72'	Report	Marrony 97', 102'; Kaba 135'	Stadium: MCH Arena

=== Mid-season friendlies ===
19 January 2024 Friendly	Midtjylland	1–4	Aab	Ikast
12:00	Charles 47'		Bakiz 3'; Prica 5'; Andersen 50'; Møller 83'	Stadium: Ikast Stadium

25 January 2024 Friendly	BK Häcken	2–4	Midtjylland	Gothenburg, Sweden
11:30	Romeo 13'; Layouni 23'; Faye (yellow card) 38'		Şimşir 3' (yellow card) 25' (goal) 41'; Iheanacho 68'; Musa 103'	Stadium: Bravida Arena

30 January 2024 Friendly	Midtjylland	7–0	Fredericia	Ikast
13:00	Şimşir; Franculino; Gorgoza; Lind; Byskov			Stadium: Ikast Stadium

10 February 2024 Friendly	Esbjerg	6–0	Midtjylland	Esbjerg
13:00	Strunck 4', 23', 45'; Sørensen 28', 57'; Montano 89'			Stadium: Blue Water Arena; Attendance: 200

=== Atlantic Cup ===
2 February 2024	Molde (Norway)	2–1	Midtjylland	Albufeira, Portugal
15:30 CET	Gulbrandsen 2'; Berisha 83'		Bech 70'	Stadium: Estádio da Nora

9 February 2023	Midtjylland	0–1	(Norway) Fredrikstad FK	Algarve, Portugal
17:00 CET			Molde 79'	Stadium: Estadio Algarve

== Competitions ==
Competition	First match	Last match	Starting round	Final position	Record							
Competition	First match	Last match	Starting round	Final position	Pld	W	D	L	GF	GA	GD	Win %
Superliga	21 July 2023	26 May 2024	Matchday 1	Winners	32	19	6	7	62	43	+19	59.38
2023–24 Danish Cup	6 September 2023	31 October 2023	Second Round	Fourth Round	3	2	0	1	15	1	+14	66.67
Conference League	26 July 2023	31 August 2023	Second Qualifying Round	Play-off Round	6	2	2	2	12	9	+3	33.33
Total					41	23	8	10	89	53	+36	56.10

Last updated: 26 May 2024
Source: Soccerway

Source: Competitive matches

=== Danish Superliga ===
==== Regular season ====
Pos	Team	Pld	W	D	L	GF	GA	GD	Pts	Qualification
1	Midtjylland	22	15	3	4	43	23	+20	48	Qualification for the Championship round
2	Brøndby	22	14	5	3	44	20	+24	47	Qualification for the Championship round
3	Copenhagen	22	14	3	5	45	23	+22	45	Qualification for the Championship round
4	Nordsjælland	22	10	7	5	35	21	+14	37	Qualification for the Championship round
5	AGF	22	9	9	4	26	21	+5	36	Qualification for the Championship round

Source: Danish Football Association (in Danish), Soccerway
Rules for classification: 1) Points; 2) Goal difference; 3) Goals scored; 4) Away goals scored; 5) Play-off (played on neutral ground if determining teams for different rounds); 6) Draw.

==== Superliga Results Summary ====
Overall								Home						Away					
Pld	W	D	L	GF	GA	GD	Pts	W	D	L	GF	GA	GD	W	D	L	GF	GA	GD
32	19	6	7	62	43	+19	63	10	4	2	34	17	+17	9	2	5	28	26	+2

Last updated: 26 May 2024.
Source: Soccerway

==== Results by round - Regular season ====
Matchday	1	2	3	4	5	6	7	8	9	10	11	12	13	14	15	16	17	18	19	20	21	22
Ground	H	H	A	A	H	A	H	A	H	A	H	A	H	A	H	A	H	A	A	H	A	H
Result	W	W	L	W	L	L	D	D	W	W	D	W	W	W	W	W	W	L	W	W	W	W
Position	5	2	4	3	4	6	6	7	5	5	5	5	4	3	3	2	1	3	3	1	1	1

Updated to match(es) played on 17 March 2024. Source: http://www.superliga.dk/
A = Away; H = Home; W = Win; D = Draw; L = Loss

==== Championship round ====
Pos	Team	Pld	W	D	L	GF	GA	GD	Pts	
1	Midtjylland (C)	32	19	6	7	62	43	+19	63	Qualification for the Champions League second qualifying round
2	Brøndby	32	18	8	6	60	35	+25	62	Qualification for the Conference League second qualifying round
3	Copenhagen (O)	32	18	5	9	64	38	+26	59	Qualification for the European play-off match
4	Nordsjælland	32	16	10	6	60	34	+26	58	
5	AGF	32	11	11	10	42	46	−4	44	

Source: Danish Football Association (in Danish), Soccerway
Rules for classification: 1) Points; 2) Goal difference; 3) Goals scored; 4) Away goals scored; 5) Play-off (played on neutral ground if determining teams for different rounds); 6) Draw.
(C) Champions; (O) Play-off winners

==== Results by round - Championship round ====
Matchday	1	2	3	4	5	6	7	8	9	10
Ground	H	A	H	A	A	H	H	A	A	H
Result	L	W	D	L	L	W	W	W	D	D
Position	2	2	2	2	3	3	2	1	2	1

Updated to match(es) played on 26 May 2024. Source: http://www.superliga.dk/
A = Away; H = Home; W = Win; D = Draw; L = Loss

==== Regular season ====
21 July 2023 1	Midtjylland	1–0	Hvidovre	Herning
19:00 CEST	Cho Gue-sung 56' (Paulinho)	FCM Summary	Gemmer (yellow card) 45+2'	Stadium: MCH Arena; Attendance: 7,846; Referee: Mads-Kristoffer Kristoffersen

30 July 2023 2	Midtjylland	2–0	Silkeborg	Herning
14:00 CEST	Şimşir 45+16'; Cho Gue-sung 45+22' (Olsson); Gartenmann (yellow card) 53'; Kaba (yellow card) 78'	FCM Summary	Adamsen (yellow card) 45+14'	Stadium: MCH Arena; Attendance: 8,843; Referee: Jacob Karlsen

6 August 2023 3	Lyngby	4–1	Midtjylland	Kongens Lyngby
14:00 CEST	Gytkjær 17' (pen); Finnsson 29' (Magnússon) (yellow card) 43'; Sørensen 48' (o.g.); Winther (yellow card) 75'; Chukwuani 82' (Kumado)	FCM Summary	Gartenmann (red card) 6'; Paulinho (yellow card) 16'; Gigović (yellow card) 39'; Cho Gue-sung 90+2' (Dalsgaard)	Stadium: Lyngby Stadium; Attendance: 5,206; Referee: Jakob Kehlet

13 August 2023 4	Vejle	1–2	Midtjylland	Vejle
14:00 CEST	Rólantsson (yellow card) 14'; Onugkha (yellow card) 30' (goal) 83' (Albentosa)	FCM Summary	Cho Gue-sung (yellow card) 38'; Şimşir 51'; Djú 59' (Gigović); Ortíz (red card) 78'	Stadium: Vejle Stadium; Attendance: 8,485; Referee: Simon Duerlund Rasmussen

20 August 2023 5	Midtjylland	0–1	Brøndby	Herning
14:00 CEST	Charles (yellow card) 33'	FCM Summary	Greve (yellow card) 40'; Heggheim (yellow card) 51'; Rasmussen (yellow card) 59'; Vallys 82' (Divković)	Stadium: MCH Arena; Attendance: 10,522; Referee: Jorgen Daugberg Burchardt

27 August 2023 6	Nordsjælland	3–0	Midtjylland	Herning
18:00 CEST	Ingvartsen 7' (Svensson) 53' (Osman); Dorgeles 90' (Ingvartsen)	FCM Summary	Brumado (yellow card) 12'; Gabriel (yellow card) 31'; Charles (yellow card) 86'	Stadium: Right to Dream Stadium; Attendance: 4,905; Referee: Sandi Putros

3 September 2023 7	Midtjylland	1–1	AGF	Herning
20:00 CEST	Brynhildsen 26' (Cho Gue-sung); Lössl (yellow card) 60'; Martínez (yellow card) 80'; Paulinho (yellow card) 85'	FCM Summary	Knudsen (yellow card) 27'; Bech 83' (Mortensen) (yellow card) 90+5'; Poulsen (yellow card) 85'	Stadium: MCH Arena; Attendance: 8,027; Referee: Peter Kjærsgaard-Andersen

15 September 2023 8	Viborg	2–2	Midtjylland	Viborg
19:00 CEST	Kuzmić (yellow card) 43'; Serginho 56' (Júnior); Zaletel 83' (Serginho)	FCM Summary	Gigović (yellow card) 48'; Cho Gue-sung 52' (Paulinho) (yellow card) 85'; Rømer (yellow card) 71'; Franculino 76'; Gabriel (yellow card) 88'	Stadium: Energi Viborg Arena; Attendance: 8,663; Referee: Aydin Uslu

24 September 2023 9	Midtjylland	2–1	OB	Herning
17:00 CEST	Cho Gue-sung 51' (pen); Rømer (yellow card) 86'; Charles 90+4' (Cho Gue-sung) (yellow card) 90+5'	FCM Summary	Deedson (yellow card) 42' (goal) 53'; Al Hajj (yellow card) 44'; Mustafić (yellow card) 66'; Mickelson (yellow card) 71'; Ivančević (yellow card) 90+6'	Stadium: MCH Arena; Attendance: 8,286; Referee: Jakob A. Sundberg

30 September 2023 10	Copenhagen	0–2	Midtjylland	Copenhagen
15:00 CEST	Falk (yellow card) 69'; Larsson (yellow card) 74'; Grabara (yellow card) 76'; Ankersen (yellow card) 82'; Lerager (yellow card) 90'	FCM Summary	Olsson (yellow card) 24'; Ingason (yellow card) 53'; Brynhildsen 63' (Sørensen); Sørensen 71' (Şimşir); Paulinho (yellow card) 74'	Stadium: Parken; Attendance: 32,032; Referee: Sandi Putros

8 October 2023 11	Midtjylland	2–2	Randers	Herning
17:00 CEST	Gigović (yellow card) 40'; Djú 62'; Osorio 67' (Rømer); Olsson (yellow card) 81'; Gabriel (yellow card) 84'	FCM Summary	Coulibaly 9'; Kopplin 71' (Kallesøe)	Stadium: MCH Arena; Attendance: 9,224; Referee: Mikkel Redder

23 October 2023 12	OB	1–2	Midtjylland	Odense
19:00 CEST	Al Hajj 44' (Köhler) (yellow card) 53'	FCM Summary	Sørensen 24' 84'; Ingason (yellow card) 31'; Bech (yellow card) 40'; Rømer (yellow card) 62'; Dalsgaard (yellow card) 57'	Stadium: Nature Energy Park; Attendance: 8,404; Referee: Jorgen Daugberg Burchardt

27 October 2023 13	Midtjylland	2–1	Lyngby	Herning
19:00 CEST	Osorio 10' (Gabriel); Gabriel 47'	FCM Summary	Sigurðsson (yellow card) 22'; Guðjohnsen 23' (Gytkjær); Winther (red card) 90+3'	Stadium: MCH Arena; Attendance: 8,604; Referee: Jakob Kehlet

5 November 2023 14	Hvidovre	1–4	Midtjylland	Hvidovre
18:00 CEST	Gemmer (yellow card) 61'; Fredslund 67' (Thomsen); Spelmann (yellow card) 90+6'	FCM Summary	Djú 19'; Cho Gue-sung 28' (pen); Makienok 43' (o.g.); Brynhildsen 90' (Lee Han-beom)	Stadium: Pro Ventilation Arena; Attendance: 2,650; Referee: Mads-Kristoffer Kristoffersen

12 November 2023 15	Midtjylland	2–0	Nordsjælland	Herning
15:00 CEST	Sørensen (yellow card) 34' (goal) 55' (Paulinho); Dalsgaard (yellow card) 56'; Osorio 90+4' (Djú)	FCM Summary	Frese (yellow card) 37'; Ascone (yellow card) 90+1'	Stadium: MCH Arena; Attendance: 9,320; Referee: Jens Maae

27 November 2023 16	Silkeborg	1–4	Midtjylland	Silkeborg
19:00 CEST	Lind (red card) 32'; Þórðarson (yellow card) 45' (goal) 45+5' (Brink); Klynge (yellow card) 62'	FCM Summary	Ingason 19' (Paulinho) (yellow card) 81'; Djú 51' (Gigović) 73' (Dalsgaard); Dalsgaard 65' (Djú)	Stadium: JYSK Park; Attendance: 6,019; Referee: Peter Kjærsgaard-Andersen

4 December 2023 17	Midtjylland	5–1	Viborg	Herning
19:00 CEST	Cho Gue-sung 45+4' (pen) 66' (Olsson); Charles (yellow card) 45+7'; Osorio 45+9' (Dalsgaard); Dalsgaard 54'; Brynhildsen 84'	FCM Summary	Serginho (yellow card) 24'; Bonde 30' (Ementa); Lund (yellow card) 45+1'	Stadium: MCH Arena; Attendance: 10,438; Referee: Jacob Karlsen

17 February 2024 18	Brøndby	1–0	Midtjylland	Brøndbyvester
18:00 CEST	Heggheim (red card) 17'; Omoijuanfo 45+4'; Wass (yellow card) 49'; Rasmussen (yellow card) 85'	FCM Summary	Cho Gue-sung (penalty missed) 19 (yellow card) 85'; Gabriel (yellow card) 31'; Paulinho (yellow card) 39'; Gogorza (yellow card) 90+3'	Stadium: Brøndby Stadium; Attendance: 21,366; Referee: Jakob Kehlet

25 February 2024 19	AGF	2–3	Midtjylland	Aarhus
18:00 CEST	Mortensen 9' (pen) 9' (pen); Brandhof (yellow card) 47'; Kahl (yellow card) 55'	FCM Summary	Ingason (yellow card) 7' (yellow-red card) 75'; Paulinho (yellow card) 32' (yellow-red card) 49'; Cho Gue-sung 45+4' (pen); Lee Han-beom 48'; Sørensen (yellow card) 88'; Charles 90+6' (Sørensen) (yellow card) 90+7'	Stadium: Ceres Park; Referee: Morten Krogh

1 March 2024 20	Midtjylland	2–0	Copenhagen	Herning
19:00 CET	Bech 34' (Sørensen); Cho Gue-sung (penalty missed) 52'; Osorio 90+4'	FCM Summary	Falk (yellow card) 62'	Stadium: MCH Arena; Attendance: 11,836; Referee: Sandi Putros

11 March 2024 21	Randers	0–1	Midtjylland	Randers
19:00 CEST	Zandén (yellow card) 38'; Enggård (yellow card) 75'	FCM Summary	Sørensen 25' (yellow card) 64'; Şimşir (yellow card) 42'	Stadium: Cepheus Park Randers; Attendance: 4,735; Referee: Jacob Karlsen

17 March 2024 22	Midtjylland	3–0	Vejle	Herning
17:00 CEST	Brynhildsen (yellow card) 7'; Şimşir (yellow card) 55' (goal) 67'; Paulinho 76'; Cho Gue-sung 90+6' (pen)	FCM Summary	Onugkha (yellow card) 44' (yellow-red card) 45+2'	Stadium: MCH Arena; Attendance: 10,994; Referee: Mikkel Redder

==== Championship Round ====
1 April 2024 23	Midtjylland	2–3	Nordsjælland	Herning
16:00 CEST	Brynhildsen (yellow card) 41'; Charles 67'; Bech (yellow card) 79'; Cho Gue-sung 81'	FCM Summary	Schjelderup (yellow card) 31'; Svensson 22' (Schjelderup); Antman 52' (Osman) (yellow card) 57'; Ingvartsen 54' (Schjelderup); Tverskov (yellow card) 81'; Hansen (yellow card) 90+5'	Stadium: MCH Arena; Attendance: 9,333; Referee: Mads-Kristoffer Kristoffersen

7 April 2024 24	AGF	0–1	Midtjylland	Aarhus
18:00 CEST	Kahl (yellow card) 39'; Andersen (yellow card) 73'; Anker (red card) 84'; Duelund (yellow card) 90+8'	FCM Summary	Osorio 21' (pen) (yellow card) 33'; Rømer (yellow card) 57'; Ingason (yellow card) 85'; Şimşir (yellow card) 90+8'	Stadium: Ceres Park; Attendance: 9,034; Referee: Jakob A. Sundberg

14 April 2024 25	Midtjylland	2–2	Copenhagen	Herning
17:00 CEST	Djú 20' (Osorio); Osorio 41'Dalsgaard (yellow card) 85'	FCM Summary	Cornelius 11' (Achouri); Lerager (yellow card) 28'; Elyounoussi (yellow card) 36'; Diks 90+5' (pen)	Stadium: MCH Arena; Attendance: 12,148; Referee: Morten Krogh

21 April 2024 26	Brøndby	2–1	Midtjylland	Brøndbyvester
18:00 CEST	Suzuki 10' (Vallys) 36'; Omoijuanfo (yellow card) 22'; Wass (yellow card) 79'	FCM Summary	Osorio (yellow card) 6'; Djú (yellow card) 52'; Bech 56' (Sørensen)	Stadium: Brøndby Stadium; Attendance: 24,386; Referee: Sandi Putros

29 April 2024 27	Silkeborg	3–0	Midtjylland	Silkeborg
19:00 CEST	Adamsen 17'; Klynge 28' (Lind); Þórðarson 45' (Adamsen); Mattsson (yellow card) 74'	FCM Summary	Juninho (yellow card) 60'; Andersson (yellow card) 77'	Stadium: JYSK Park; Attendance: 6,130; Referee: Mads-Kristoffer Kristoffersen

5 May 2024 28	Midtjylland	3–2	Brøndby	Herning
18:00 CEST	Dalsgaard 9' (yellow card) 21'; Osorio 22'; Ingason (yellow card) 45+2'; Djú 74' (Ingason)	FCM Summary	Vallys 12' (Suzuki) (yellow card) 45+4'; Vanlerberghe (yellow card) 28'; Omoijuanfo 31' (Klaiber)	Stadium: MCH Arena; Attendance: 11,861; Referee: Jakob A. Sundberg

12 May 2024 29	Midtjylland	2–1	AGF	Herning
18:00 CEST	Cho Gue-sung 24'; Bech 32' (Cho Gue-sung); Martínez (yellow card) 45'; Byskov (yellow card) 90+1'	FCM Summary	Anker 45+1' (Kahl); Brandhof (yellow card) 55'	Stadium: MCH Arena; Attendance: 10,762; Referee: Jacob Karlsen

16 May 2024 30	Copenhagen	1–2	Midtjylland	Copenhagen
20:00 CEST	Mattsson (yellow card) 49'; Gonçalves 87' (pen)	FCM Summary	Djú 23'; Emiliano Martínez (yellow card) 30'; Charles (yellow card) 33' (goal) 37' (Djú); Dalsgaard (yellow card) 41'; Osorio (yellow card) 42'; Brynhildsen (yellow card) 65'; Cho Gue-sung (yellow card) 90+3'	Stadium: Parken; Attendance: 34,917; Referee: Mads-Kristoffer Kristoffersen

20 May 2024 31	Nordsjælland	3–3	Midtjylland	Farum
18:00 CEST	Osman 11' (Svensson); Nygren 16' (Schjelderup) 36' (Frese); Frese (yellow card) 86'	FCM Summary	Djú 38' (Osorio); Bech 45+2'; Ingason (yellow card) 70' (goal) 79' (Martínez)	Stadium: Right to Dream Park; Attendance: 8,649; Referee: Jakob Kehlet

26 May 2024 32	Midtjylland	3–3	Silkeborg	Herning
17:00 CEST	Sørensen (yellow card) 68'; Bech (yellow card) 45'; Djú 46' (Paulinho); Brynhildsen 48' (Cho Gue-sung); Şimşir 52' (Martínez)	FCM Summary	Adamsen 13' (Sonne); Sørensen 26' (o.g.); Larsen (yellow card) 30'; McCowatt 82' (Adamsen); Brink (yellow card) 90+2'	Stadium: MCH Arena; Attendance: 11,590; Referee: Sandi Putros

=== Danish Cup ===
6 September 2023 Second round	Aabenraa BK	0–13	Midtjylland	Aabenraa
17:00 CEST		FCM Summary	Rømer Fossum'; Gabriel 9' (Dyhr); Iheanacho 35' (Brynhildsen) 43' (Marrony) 53' (Fossum) 65'; Brynhildsen 37' (Dyhr); Marrony 40' (Dyhr) 83' 90' (Iheanacho); Pedersen 59' (o.g.); Fossum 66'; Voldby 76'	Stadium: Aabenraa Stadium; Attendance: 3,000; Referee: Mads-Kristoffer Kristoffersen

27 September 2023 Third round	Næstved BK	0–2	Midtjylland	Næstved
18:00 CEST	Mølvadgaard (yellow card) 37' (yellow-red card) 39'; Dannevang (yellow card) 85'	Report	Charles 8' (Sørensen); Gabriel (yellow card) 87'; Djú 90+2' (Sørensen)	Stadium: TintShop Park; Referee: Jonas Hansen

31 October 2023 Fourth round	Copenhagen	1–0	Midtjylland	Copenhagen
20:15 CEST	Vavro (yellow card) 71'; Bardghji 77' (Lerager) (yellow card) 90'	Report	Olsson (yellow card) 45+1'; Djú (yellow card) 82'	Stadium: Parken; Attendance: 17,895; Referee: Morten Krogh

=== UEFA Europa Conference League ===
==== Second qualifying round ====
27 July 2023 First leg	Midtjylland	2–0	(Luxembourg) Progrès Niederkorn	Herning
18:45 CEST	Cho Gue-sung (yellow card) 27'; Dalsgaard 37'; Kaba 59' (Dalsgaard); Gigović (yellow card) 86'	FCM Summary	Latik (yellow card) 20'; Peugnet (yellow card) 27'; De Almeida (yellow card) 30'; Lybohy (yellow card) 45+2'; Amofa (yellow card) 46'	Stadium: MCH Arena; Attendance: 6,609; Referee: Volen Chinkov (Bulgaria)

3 August 2023 Second leg	Progrès Niederkorn (Luxembourg)	2–1 (a.e.t.) (2–3 agg.)	Midtjylland	Differdange, Luxembourg
19:30 CEST	De Almeida 15' 52' (Karayer); Amofa (yellow card) 28'; Lybohy (yellow card) 61'; Bastos (yellow card) 103'	FCM Summary	Gigović (yellow card) 90+2'; Sørensen (yellow card) 96'; Chilufya 112'; Olsson (yellow card) 118'	Stadium: Stade Municipal de la Ville de Differdange; Referee: Ferenk Karakó (Hungary)

==== Third qualifying round ====
10 August 2023 First leg	Omonia (Cyprus)	1–0	Midtjylland	Nicosia, Cyprus
19:00 CEST	Bezus 38'	FCM Summary	Cho Gue-sung (yellow card) 60'	Stadium: GSP Stadium; Attendance: 14,571; Referee: Sigurd Smehus Kringstad (Norway)

17 August 2023 Second leg	Midtjylland	5–1 (5–2 agg.)	(Cyprus) Omonia	Herning
19:45 CEST	Cho Gue-sung 27' (pen); Şimşir (yellow card) 34'; Djú 43' (Olsson) 45+3' (Paulinho) 64' (Kaba); Olsson (yellow card) 52'; Martínez (yellow card) 77'; Gigović 80' (Fossum)	Report	Matthews (yellow card) 17'; Kousoulos (red card) 24'; Bachirou (yellow card) 25'; Kakoullis 31'; Bezus (yellow card) 34'; Ansarifard (yellow card) 76'; Simić (yellow card) 90+2'	Stadium: MCH Arena; Attendance: 7,008; Referee: Ian McNabb (Northern Ireland)

==== Play-off round ====
24 August 2023 First leg	Midtjylland	3–3	(Poland) Legia Warsaw	Herning
20:00 CEST	Juninho 16' (Olsson); Djú 34' 71'; Gigović (yellow card) 52'; Dyhr (yellow card) 82'; Brumado (yellow card) 88'	FCM Summary	Gaul 26' (Wszołek) (yellow card) 61'; Wszołek (yellow card) 29'; Josué (yellow card) 43'; Slisz (yellow card) 45+2' (goal) 64' (Josué); Kramer 86' (Rosołek)	Stadium: MCH Arena; Attendance: 7,228; Referee: Mykola Balakin (Ukraine)

31 August 2023 Second leg	Legia Warsaw (Poland)	1–1 (4–4 agg.) (7–6 p)	Midtjylland	Warsaw
21:00 CEST	Pekhart 53'; Slisz (yellow card) 70'	Report	Juninho (yellow card) 48'; Paulinho 70'; Dalsgaard (yellow card) 70'	Stadium: Stadion Wojska Polskiego; Referee: Simone Sozza (Italy)
	Penalties
	Slisz (penalty scored); Muçi (penalty scored); Pankov (penalty scored); Kramer (penalty scored); Josué (penalty scored); Rosołek (penalty scored)		(penalty scored) Cho Gue-sung; (penalty scored) Juninho; (penalty scored) Rømer; (penalty scored) Sørensen; (penalty scored) Dyhr; (penalty missed) Gartenmann

== Statistics ==
As of 26 May 2024

=== Appearances and goals ===
No.	Pos	Nat	Player	Total		Superliga		Danish Cup		Conference League	
No.	Pos	Nat	Player	Apps	Goals	Apps	Goals	Apps	Goals	Apps	Goals
1	GK	(Denmark) DEN	Jonas Lössl	31	0	24+1	0	0	0	6	0
2	MF	(Denmark) DEN	André Rømer	26	1	14+8	0	2+1	1	0+1	0
3	DF	(South Korea) KOR	Lee Han-beom	3	1	1+2	1	0	0	0	0
5	MF	(Uruguay) URU	Emiliano Martínez	20	0	9+5	0	0	0	4+2	0
6	DF	(Sweden) SWE	Joel Andersson	8	0	0+8	0	0	0	0	0
8	MF	(Sweden) SWE	Kristoffer Olsson	20	0	13	0	1	0	6	0
9	FW	(Norway) NOR	Ola Brynhildsen	25	6	16+6	5	3	1	0	0
10	FW	(South Korea) KOR	Cho Gue-sung	36	13	28+1	12	1+1	0	5	1
11	FW	(Chile) CHI	Darío Osorio	23	8	14+8	8	0+1	0	0	0
13	DF	(Czech Republic) CZE	Adam Gabriel	21	2	10+7	1	2+1	1	0+1	0
14	DF	(Denmark) DEN	Henrik Dalsgaard	31	4	18+6	3	2	0	5	1
15	DF	(Iceland) ISL	Sverrir Ingi Ingason	29	2	23	2	2	0	4	0
17	FW	(Guinea-Bissau) GNB	Franculino Djú	31	17	15+11	11	1+1	1	3	5
18	FW	(Zambia) ZAM	Edward Chilufya	5	1	0+3	0	0	0	0+2	1
19	FW	(Nigeria) NGA	Stanley Iheanacho	1	4	0	0	1	4	0	0
20	MF	(Denmark) DEN	Valdemar Byskov	4	0	0+4	0	0	0	0	0
22	DF	(Denmark) DEN	Mads Bech Sørensen	26	4	22+1	4	3	0	0	0
24	DF	(Denmark) DEN	Oliver Sørensen	37	5	28+1	5	2	0	5+1	0
25	MF	(Norway) NOR	Iver Fossum	10	2	2+2	0	2	2	0+4	0
26	DF	(Colombia) COL	Pablo Ortíz	4	0	2+1	0	0	0	0+1	0
29	DF	(Brazil) BRA	Paulinho	32	2	25+1	1	1	0	5	1
33	FW	(Denmark) DEN	Mikel Gogorza	1	0	0+1	0	0	0	0	0
35	MF	(Brazil) BRA	Charles	33	5	13+13	4	2	1	1+4	0
37	MF	(Bosnia and Herzegovina) BIH	Armin Gigović	34	1	14+12	0	1+1	0	4+2	1
38	FW	(Brazil) BRA	Marrony	7	3	0+3	0	1	3	0+3	0
44	MF	(Denmark) DEN	Nikolas Dyhr	21	0	2+11	0	2+1	0	1+4	0
45	FW	(Sierra Leone) SLE	Alhaji Kamara	1	0	0+1	0	0	0	0	0
50	GK	(Austria) AUT	Martin Fraisl	10	0	7	0	3	0	0	0
55	DF	(Denmark) DEN	Victor Bak Jensen	11	0	6+4	0	0	0	0+1	0
58	FW	(Denmark) DEN	Aral Şimşir	32	4	16+8	4	1+1	0	6	0
73	DF	(Brazil) BRA	Juninho	31	1	14+10	0	0+1	0	6	1
74	FW	(Brazil) BRA	Júnior Brumado	4	0	1+1	0	0	0	0+2	0
--	FW	(Denmark) DEN	Julius Voldby	1	1	0	0	0+1	1	0	0
--	DF	(Denmark) DEN	Adam Andersen	1	0	0	0	0+1	0	0	0
--	MF	(Denmark) DEN	Christian Jörgensen	1	0	0	0	0+1	0	0	0
--	FW	(Ghana) GHA	Akwasi Owusu	1	0	0	0	0+1	0	0	0
--	MF	(Guinea-Bissau) GNB	Alamari Djabi	1	0	0	0	0+1	0	0	0
Players away from the club on loan:
4	MF	(Denmark) DEN	Stefan Gartenmann	8	0	3	0	0	0	4+1	0
21	FW	(Denmark) DEN	August Priske	1	0	0+1	0	0	0	0	0
Players who left Midtjylland during the season:
9	FW	(Guinea) GUI	Sory Kaba	8	1	1+3	0	0	0	1+3	1
11	FW	(Denmark) DEN	Gustav Isaksen	3	0	2	0	0	0	1	0

=== Goal scorers ===
Place	Position	Nation	Number	Name	Superliga	Pokalen	Conference League	Total
1	FW	(Guinea-Bissau)	17	Franculino Djú	11	1	5	17
2	FW	(South Korea)	10	Cho Gue-sung	12	0	1	13
3	FW	(Chile)	11	Darío Osorio	8	0	0	8
4	FW	(Norway)	9	Ola Brynhildsen	5	1	0	6
5	DF	(Denmark)	24	Oliver Sørensen	5	0	0	5
5	MF	(Brazil)	35	Charles	4	1	0	5
8	FW	(Nigeria)	13	Stanley Iheanacho	0	4	0	4
8	DF	(Denmark)	14	Henrik Dalsgaard	3	0	1	4
8	DF	(Denmark)	22	Mads Bech Sørensen	4	0	0	4
8	FW	(Turkey)	58	Aral Şimşir	4	0	0	4
10	FW	(Brazil)	38	Marrony	0	3	0	3
11	DF	(Czech Republic)	13	Adam Gabriel	1	1	0	2
11	DF	(Brazil)	29	Paulinho	2	0	1	2
11	DF	(Iceland)	15	Sverrir Ingi Ingason	2	0	0	2
13	MF	(Zambia)	18	Edward Chilufya	0	0	1	1
13	MF	(Bosnia and Herzegovina)	37	Armin Gigović	0	0	1	1
13	DF	(Brazil)	73	Juninho	0	0	1	1
13	MF	(Denmark)	2	André Rømer	0	1	0	1
13	MF	(Norway)	25	Iver Fossum	0	1	0	1
13	FW	(Denmark)	--	Julius Voldby	0	1	0	1
13	DF	(South Korea)	3	Lee Han-beom	1	0	0	1
Own goal(s)					1	1	0	2
Players who left Midtjylland during the season:
	FW	(Guinea)	9	Sory Kaba	0	0	1	1
Total					62	15	12	89

=== Assists ===
Place	Position	Nation	Number	Name	Superliga	Pokalen	Conference League	Total
1	DF	(Brazil)	29	Paulinho	5	0	1	6
2	DF	(Denmark)	24	Oliver Sørensen	3	2	0	5
3	MF	(Sweden)	8	Kristoffer Olsson	2	0	2	4
3	DF	(Denmark)	14	Henrik Dalsgaard	3	0	1	4
3	FW	(Chile)	11	Darío Osorio	4	0	0	4
3	FW	(South Korea)	10	Cho Gue-sung	4	0	0	4
7	DF	(Denmark)	44	Nikolas Dyhr	0	3	0	3
7	MF	(Norway)	25	Iver Fossum	0	2	1	3
7	FW	(Guinea-Bissau)	17	Franculino Djú	2	1	0	3
10	MF	(Bosnia and Herzegovina)	37	Armin Gigović	2	0	0	2
10	MF	(Uruguay)	5	Emiliano Martínez	2	0	0	2
12	FW	(Norway)	9	Ola Brynhildsen	0	1	0	1
12	FW	(Brazil)	38	Marrony	0	1	0	1
12	FW	(Nigeria)	19	Stanley Iheanacho	0	1	0	1
12	FW	(Turkey)	58	Aral Şimşir	1	0	0	1
12	MF	(Denmark)	2	André Rømer	1	0	0	0
12	DF	(South Korea)	3	Lee Han-beom	1	0	0	1
12	DF	(Denmark)	22	Mads Bech Sørensen	1	0	0	1
12	DF	(Iceland)	15	Sverrir Ingi Ingason	1	0	0	1
Players who left Midtjylland during the season:
	FW	(Guinea)	9	Sory Kaba	0	0	1	1
Total					33	10	6	49

=== Clean Sheets ===
Place	Position	Nation	Number	Name	Superliga	Pokalen	Conference League	Total
1	GK	(Denmark)	1	Jonas Lössl	6	0	1	7
2	GK	(Austria)	50	Martin Fraisl	1	2	0	3
Total					7	2	1	10

=== Hat-tricks ===
Player	Against	Result	Date	Competition	Ref
Franculino Djú	Omonia	5–1	17 Aug 2023	Europa Conference League	
Stanley Iheanacho	Aabenraa	13–0	6 Sep 2023	Danish Cup	
Marrony	Aabenraa	13–0	6 Sep 2023	Danish Cup	

=== Disciplinary record ===
Number	Position	Nation	Name	Superliga			Pokalen			Conference League			Total		
Number	Position	Nation	Name	Booked	(yellow card) (yellow-red card)	Sent off (straight red)	Booked	(yellow card) (yellow-red card)	Sent off (straight red)	Booked	(yellow card) (yellow-red card)	Sent off (straight red)	Booked	(yellow card) (yellow-red card)	Sent off (straight red)
1	GK	(Denmark)	Jonas Lössl	1	0	0	0	0	0	0	0	0	1	0	0
2	MF	(Denmark)	André Rømer	4	0	0	0	0	0	0	0	0	4	0	0
5	MF	(Uruguay)	Emiliano Martínez	3	0	0	0	0	0	1	0	0	4	0	0
8	MF	(Sweden)	Kristoffer Olsson	2	0	0	1	0	0	2	0	0	5	0	0
9	FW	(Norway)	Ola Brynhildsen	2	0	0	0	0	0	0	0	0	2	0	0
10	FW	(South Korea)	Cho Gue-sung	4	0	0	0	0	0	2	0	0	6	0	0
11	FW	(Chile)	Darío Osorio	3	0	0	0	0	0	0	0	0	3	0	0
13	DF	(Czech Republic)	Adam Gabriel	4	0	0	1	0	0	0	0	0	5	0	0
14	DF	(Denmark)	Henrik Dalsgaard	5	0	0	0	0	0	1	0	0	6	0	0
15	DF	(Iceland)	Sverrir Ingi Ingason	7	1	0	0	0	0	0	0	0	7	1	0
17	FW	(Guinea-Bissau)	Franculino Djú	1	0	0	1	0	0	0	0	0	2	0	0
20	MF	(Denmark)	Valdemar Byskov	1	0	0	0	0	0	0	0	0	1	0	0
22	DF	(Denmark)	Mads Bech Sørensen	3	0	0	0	0	0	0	0	0	3	0	0
24	MF	(Denmark)	Oliver Sørensen	4	0	0	0	0	0	1	0	0	5	0	0
26	DF	(Colombia)	Pablo Ortíz	0	0	1	0	0	0	0	0	0	0	0	1
29	DF	(Brazil)	Paulinho	5	1	0	0	0	0	0	0	0	5	1	0
33	FW	(Denmark)	Mikel Gogorca	1	0	0	0	0	0	0	0	0	1	0	0
35	MF	(Brazil)	Charles	6	0	0	0	0	0	0	0	0	6	0	0
37	MF	(Bosnia and Herzegovina)	Armin Gigović	3	0	0	0	0	0	3	0	0	6	0	0
44	DF	(Denmark)	Nikolas Dyhr	0	0	0	0	0	0	1	0	0	1	0	0
58	FW	(Turkey)	Aral Şimşir	2	0	0	0	0	0	1	0	0	3	0	0
73	DF	(Brazil)	Juninho	0	0	0	0	0	0	1	0	0	1	0	0
74	FW	(Brazil)	Júnior Brumado	1	0	0	0	0	0	1	0	0	2	0	0
Players away from the club on loan:
4	DF	(Denmark)	Stefan Gartenmann	1	0	1	0	0	0	0	0	0	1	0	1
Players who left Midtjylland during the season:
9	FW	(Guinea)	Sory Kaba	1	0	0	0	0	0	0	0	0	1	0	0
Total				64	2	2	3	0	0	14	0	0	81	2	2

== Home attendance ==
As of 26 May 2024

Competition	Total	Games	Average
Superliga	158,930	16	9,933
Pokalen	0	0	0
Conference League	21,545	3	7,182
Total	180,475	19	9,499
