= Jeppe Kjær =

Jeppe Kjær may refer to:

- Jeppe Kjær (footballer, born 1985), Danish football forward
- Jeppe Kjær (footballer, born 2004), Danish football winger
