= Hastrup (surname) =

Hastrup is a Danish surname. Notable people with the surname include:

- Jannik Hastrup (born 1941), Danish writer, film director, producer, illustrator and animator
- Kirsten Hastrup (born 1948), Danish anthropologist and professor
- Rune Hastrup (born 1991), Danish footballer
- Vibeke Hastrup (born 1958), Danish actress

== See also ==
- Mads Vibe-Hastrup (born 1978), Danish golfer
- 16589 Hastrup, main-belt asteroid
