= Charles (footballer, born 1996) =

Brazilian footballer (born 1996)

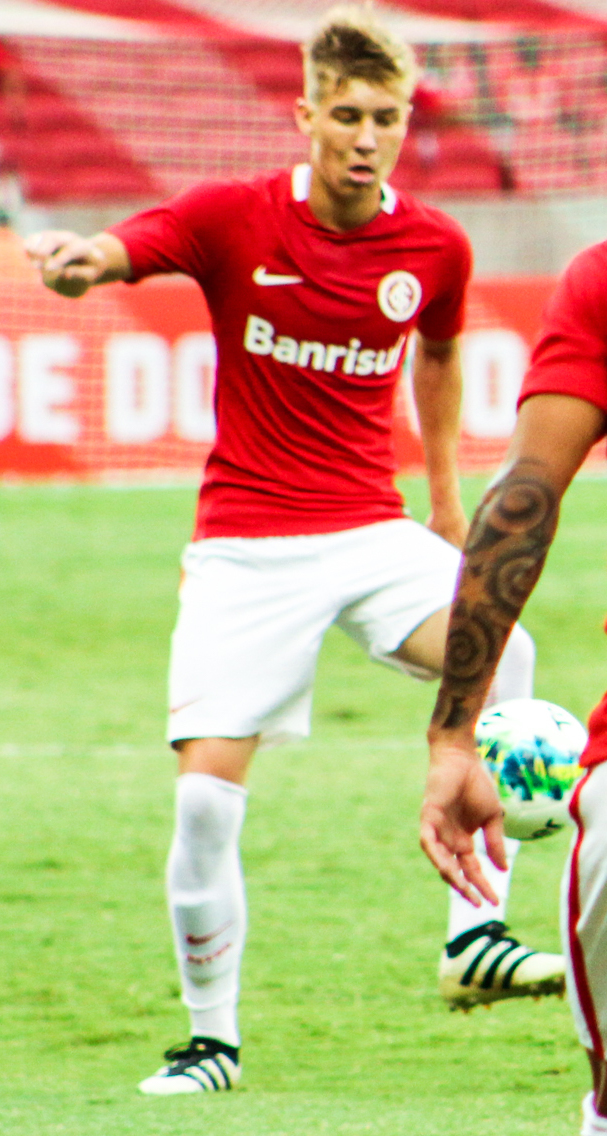
- Charles with Internacional in 2017

Personal information
- Full name: Charles Rigon Matos
- Date of birth: 19 June 1996 (age 30)
- Place of birth: Santiago, Brazil
- Height: 1.87 m (6 ft 2 in)
- Position: Midfielder

Team information
- Current team: Corinthians
- Number: 35

Youth career
- Santo Ângelo
- 2015–2017: Internacional

Senior career*
Years	Team	Apps	(Gls)
2015	Santo Ângelo	14	(2)
2017–2019	Internacional	31	(2)
2019	→ Sport Recife (loan)	46	(3)
2020–2021	Ceará	44	(3)
2021–2024	Midtjylland	70	(8)
2024–	Corinthians	55	(2)
- * Club domestic league appearances and goals as of 5 November 2026

Charles Rigon Matos (born 19 June 1996), simply known as Charles, is a Brazilian professional footballer who plays as a midfielder for Campeonato Brasileiro Série A
Campeonato Paulista club Corinthians.

== Club career ==
=== Early career ===
Born in Santiago, Charles graduated from the youth academy of Santo Ângelo and was promoted to the senior team in 2015. He started the season as an attacking midfielder and later switched to the right back position.

=== Internacional ===
On 11 June 2015, Charles moved to Internacional and was assigned to the youth team. In 2016, while playing for Internacional B, he won the Copa FGF.

On 1 February 2017, Charles made his senior debut by coming on as a 39th minute substitute for Anselmo in a 2–1 win against Brasil de Pelotas, in Primeira Liga. Seven days later, he scored his first goal for the club in a 1–0 victory against Fluminense, in the same competition.

On 2 March 2017, Charles' contract was extended until 2020.

==== Sport Recife (loan) ====
On 16 January 2019, Charles was loaned out to Sport Recife on a one-year contract.

=== Ceará ===
Ceará confirmed on 31 December 2019, that they had acquired 50% of Charles' rights for 3 million R$, where the remaining 50% belonged to Internacional.

=== Midtjylland ===
In June 2021, Charles signed a five-year contract with Danish Superliga runners-up Midtjylland. Upon signing with the club, he stated that the presence of other Brazilian players in the club – including Paulinho, Evander and Júnior Brumado – created comfort in his choice, as well as the prospect of playing in European competitions. He made his debut for Midtjylland on 24 July 2021, on the second matchday of the 2021–22 season in a game against AaB, coming on as a substitute for Mikael Anderson as Midtjylland won 1–0.

=== Corinthians ===
On 24 July 2024, Charles returned to Brazil, joining Corinthians on a four-year deal.

== Career statistics ==
As of match played 5 November 2026

Appearances and goals by club, season and competition
Club	Season	League			State league (Note: Includes Campeonato Gaúcho, Campeonato Pernambucano, Campeonato Cearense, Campeonato Paulista)		National cup (Note: Includes Copa do Brasil, Danish Cup)		Continental		Other		Total	
Club	Season	Division	Apps	Goals	Apps	Goals	Apps	Goals	Apps	Goals	Apps	Goals	Apps	Goals
Santo Ângelo	2015	Gaúcho Série A2	—		14	2	—		—		—		14	2
Internacional	2017	Série B	17	0	7	0	3	1	—		3 (Note: Appearances in Primeira Liga)	1	30	2
Internacional	2018	Série A	2	0	5	0	—		—		—		7	0
Internacional	Total		19	0	12	0	3	1	—		3	1	37	2
Sport Recife (loan)	2019	Série B	34	2	12	1	1	0	—		—		47	3
Ceará	2020	Série A	31	2	6	1	9	0	—		9 (Note: Appearances in Copa do Nordeste)	0	55	3
Ceará	2021	Série A	6	0	1	0	2	0	6 (Note: Appearances in Copa Sudamericana)	0	6	0	21	0
Ceará	Total		37	2	7	1	11	0	6	0	15	0	76	3
Midtjylland	2021–22	Danish Superliga	23	1	—		7	1	9 (Note: Three appearances in UEFA Champions League, four appearances in UEFA Europa League, two appearances in UEFA Europa Conference League)	0	—		39	2
Midtjylland	2022–23	Danish Superliga	20	0	—		2	0	6 (Note: Three appearances in UEFA Champions League, three appearances in UEFA Europa League)	0	—		28	0
Midtjylland	2023–24	Danish Superliga	27	4	—		2	3	5 (Note: Appearances in UEFA Europa Conference League)	0	—		34	7
Midtjylland	Total		70	5	—		11	4	20	0	—		101	9
Corinthians	2024	Série A	13	1	—		5	0	6	0	—		24	1
Corinthians	2025	Série A	17	1	10	0	7	0	3	0	—		37	1
Corinthians	2026	Série A	9	0	6	0	0	0	2 (Note: Appearance in Copa Libertadores)	0	1 (Note: Appearance in Supercopa do Brasil)	0	18	0
Corinthians	Total		39	2	16	0	12	0	11	0	1	0	79	2
Career total			199	11	61	4	38	5	37	0	19	1	354	21

== Honours ==
Sport

- Campeonato Pernambucano: 2019

Ceará

- Copa do Nordeste: 2020

Midtjylland

- Danish Superliga: 2023–24
- Danish Cup: 2021–22

Corinthians

- Campeonato Paulista: 2025
- Copa do Brasil: 2025
- Supercopa do Brasil: 2026
