= Jens Odgaard =

Danish footballer (born 1999)

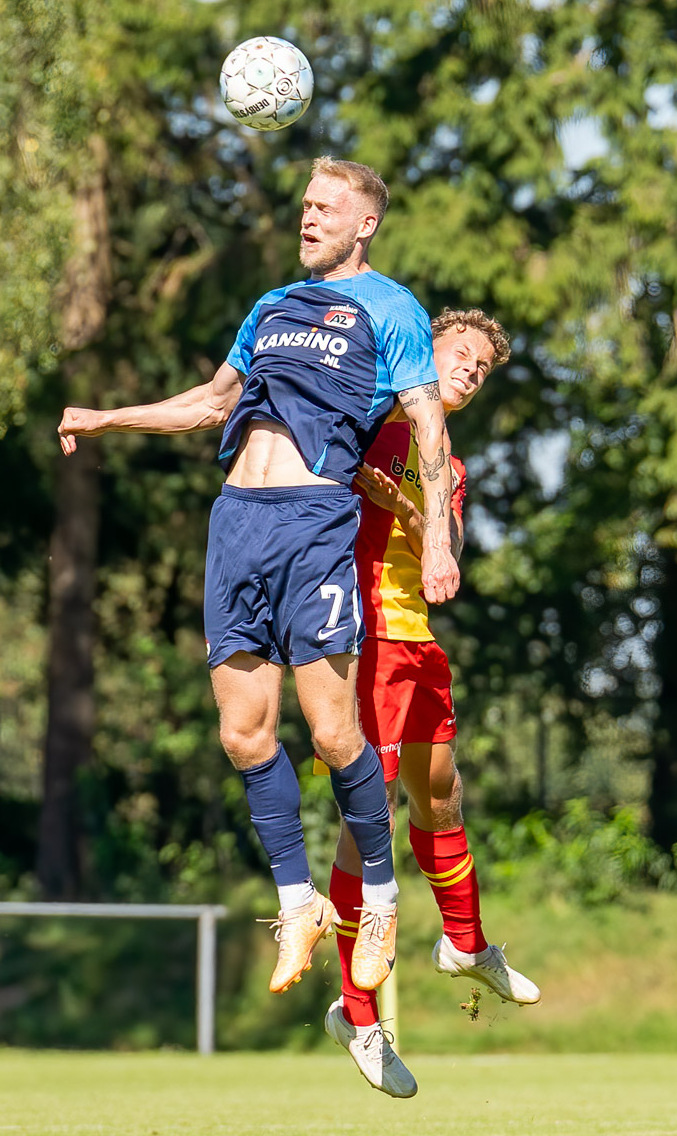
- Odgaard (left) playing for AZ in 2023

Personal information
- Date of birth: 31 March 1999 (age 27)
- Place of birth: Hillerød, Denmark
- Height: 1.91 m (6 ft 3 in)
- Position: Midfielder

Team information
- Current team: Bologna
- Number: 21

Youth career
- –2017: Lyngby
- 2017–2018: Inter Milan

Senior career*
Years	Team	Apps	(Gls)
2016–2017	Lyngby	18	(3)
2017–2018	Inter Milan	0	(0)
2018–2022	Sassuolo	1	(0)
2019–2020	→ Heerenveen (loan)	24	(7)
2020	→ Lugano (loan)	6	(0)
2021	→ Pescara (loan)	19	(1)
2021–2022	→ RKC Waalwijk (loan)	30	(8)
2022–2024	AZ	46	(10)
2024	→ Bologna (loan)	10	(2)
2024–	Bologna	60	(11)

International career^{‡}
2014–2015	Denmark U16	8	(3)
2015–2016	Denmark U17	17	(8)
2016–2017	Denmark U18	5	(3)
2017–2019	Denmark U19	9	(8)
2019	Denmark U21	5	(2)
- * Club domestic league appearances and goals as of 19:18, 19 September 2026 (UTC) ‡ National team caps and goals as of 19 November 2019

Jens Odgaard (Danish pronunciation: [ˈʌðˌkɒˀ]; born 31 March 1999) is a Danish professional footballer who plays as a midfielder for Serie A club Bologna.

== Youth career ==
Odgaard is a youth exponent from Lyngby Boldklub.

== Club career ==
=== Lyngby Boldklub ===
Odgaard got his debut for Lyngby BK on 15 March 2016 at the age of just 16. He started on the bench, but replaced Gustav Therkildsen in the 89th minute in a 1–0 victory against Aalborg in the Danish Cup.

He played his first league game on 17 April 2016, where he came on the pitch in the 65th minute, replacing Jeppe Kjær, in a 2–0 victory against Næstved BK.

Odgaard extended his contract with Lyngby in the summer 2016 until the summer 2018, and was moved up to the senior squad. He was the youngest player ever for Lyngby Boldklub, to have played a match in the Danish Superliga, at the age of 17 years and 115 days.

=== Inter ===
On 5 July 2017, Inter Milan announced the signing of Odgaard. He played for the youth team.

=== Sassuolo ===
On 30 June 2018, Odgaard was transferred to Serie A team Sassuolo, however Inter Milan reserved the right to buy him back.

==== Heerenveen (loan) ====
On 22 June 2019, Odgaard joined to Eredivisie club SC Heerenveen on loan until 30 June 2020.

==== Lugano (loan) ====
On 2 October 2020, Odgaard joined Swiss club Lugano on loan until 30 June 2021.

==== Pescara (loan) ====
On 22 January 2021, Odgaard joined Serie B club Pescara, on a loan until the end of the season.

==== RKC Waalwijk (loan) ====
On 24 July 2021, he moved to RKC Waalwijk in the Netherlands on a new loan.

=== AZ ===
On 24 June 2022, Odgaard moved to Dutch club AZ and signed a five-year contract.

=== Bologna ===
On 1 February 2024, Odgaard returned to Italy and joined Bologna on loan with an option to buy. On 16 May 2024, Bologna exercised their option to make the transfer permanent.

On 14 May 2025, he won Coppa Italia with Bologna, helping the club to their first major trophy in 51 years.

== Career statistics ==
As of match played 19 September 2026

Appearances and goals by club, season and competition
Club	Season	League			National cup (Note: Includes Danish Cup, KNVB Cup, Coppa Italia)		Europe		Other		Total	
Club	Season	Division	Apps	Goals	Apps	Goals	Apps	Goals	Apps	Goals	Apps	Goals
Lyngby	2015–16	Danish 1st Division	2	0	1	0	—		—		3	0
Lyngby	2016–17	Danish Superliga	16	3	1	1	—		—		17	4
Lyngby	Total		18	3	2	1	—		—		20	4
Sassuolo	2018–19	Serie A	1	0	0	0	—		—		1	0
Heerenveen (loan)	2019–20	Eredivisie	24	7	3	0	—		—		27	7
Lugano (loan)	2020–21	Swiss Super League	6	0	0	0	—		—		6	0
Pescara (loan)	2020–21	Serie B	19	1	0	0	—		—		19	1
RKC Waalwijk (loan)	2021–22	Eredivisie	30	8	3	3	—		—		33	11
AZ	2022–23	Eredivisie	29	9	2	1	11 (Note: Appearances in UEFA Europa Conference League)	2	0	0	42	12
AZ	2023–24	Eredivisie	17	1	2	1	7	0	0	0	26	2
AZ	Total		46	10	4	2	18	2	0	0	68	14
Bologna (loan)	2023–24	Serie A	10	2	—		—		—		10	2
Bologna	2024–25	Serie A	29	6	3	0	5 (Note: Appearances in UEFA Champions League)	0	—		37	6
Bologna	2025–26	Serie A	26	5	2	0	11 (Note: Appearances in UEFA Europa League)	2	2 (Note: Appearances in Supercoppa Italiana)	0	41	7
Bologna	2026–27	Serie A	5	0	0	0	—		—		5	0
Bologna	Total		60	11	5	0	16	2	2	0	83	13
Career total			214	42	17	6	34	4	2	0	267	52

== Honours ==
Bologna

- Coppa Italia: 2024–25

Individual

- Eredivisie Team of the Month: December 2021, September 2022
