= Martin Fraisl =

Austrian footballer

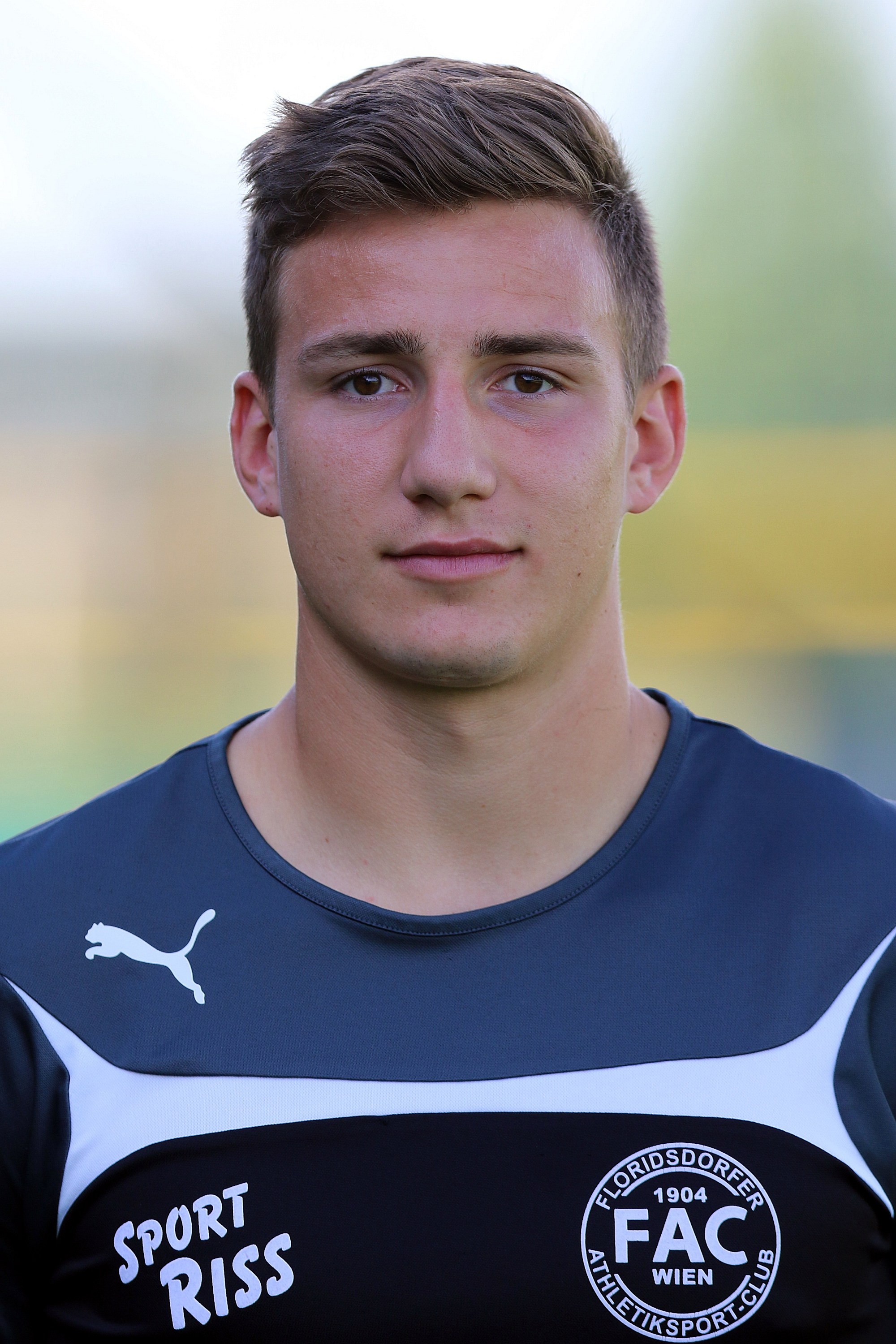
- Fraisl in 2016

Personal information
- Date of birth: 10 May 1993 (age 33)
- Place of birth: Wolfsbach, Austria
- Height: 1.90 m (6 ft 3 in)
- Position: Goalkeeper

Youth career
- 2001–2010: Sportunion Wolfsbach

Senior career*
Years	Team	Apps	(Gls)
2010	Sportunion Wolfsbach	2	(0)
2010–2012	USC Seitenstetten	12	(0)
2012–2013	SV Sierning	25	(0)
2013–2014	Wiener Sport-Club	21	(0)
2014–2016	Wiener Neustadt	1	(0)
2014–2015	→ Wiener Sport-Club (loan)	29	(0)
2016–2018	Floridsdorfer AC	62	(1)
2018–2019	Botoșani	15	(0)
2019–2021	SV Sandhausen	45	(0)
2021	ADO Den Haag	15	(0)
2021–2022	Schalke 04	26	(0)
2021–2022	Schalke 04 II	1	(0)
2022–2023	Arminia Bielefeld	29	(0)
2023–2024	Midtjylland	7	(0)
2024–2025	Mafra	31	(0)
- * Club domestic league appearances and goals

Martin Fraisl (born 10 May 1993) is an Austrian professional footballer who plays as a goalkeeper.

== Club career ==
In July 2021, Fraisl joined Schalke 04.

On 24 August 2022, he moved to Arminia Bielefeld.

On 2 August 2023, Fraisl signed with Danish Superliga club Midtjylland on a two-year contract.

On 15 July 2024, he transferred to Liga Portugal 2 club C.D. Mafra.

On 29 October 2025, 32-year old Fraisl announced his retirement from football.

== International career ==
He was called up to the senior Austria squad for the UEFA Nations League matches against Croatia, Denmark, France and Denmark on 3, 6, 10 and 13 June 2022.

== Career statistics ==
As of match played 30 April 2025

Appearances and goals by club, season and competition
Club	Season	League			National cup (Note: Includes Austrian Cup, Cupa României, DFB-Pokal, Danish Cup, Taça de Portugal)		Other		Total	
Club	Season	Division	Apps	Goals	Apps	Goals	Apps	Goals	Apps	Goals
Wiener Sport-Club	2013–14	Austrian Regionalliga East	21	0	0	0	—		21	0
Wiener Sport-Club	2014–15	Austrian Regionalliga East	29	0	2	0	—		31	0
Wiener Sport-Club	Total		50	0	2	0	—		52	0
Wiener Neustadt	2015–16	Austrian 2. Liga	1	0	2	0	—		3	0
Floridsdorfer AC	2015–16	Austrian 2. Liga	15	0	0	0	—		15	0
Floridsdorfer AC	2016–17	Austrian 2. Liga	13	0	2	0	—		15	0
Floridsdorfer AC	2017–18	Austrian 2. Liga	34	1	1	0	—		35	1
Floridsdorfer AC	Total		62	1	3	0	—		65	1
Botoșani	2018–19	Liga I	15	0	1	0	—		16	0
SV Sandhausen	2019–20	2. Bundesliga	34	0	1	0	—		35	0
SV Sandhausen	2020–21	2. Bundesliga	11	0	1	0	—		12	0
SV Sandhausen	Total		45	0	2	0	—		47	0
ADO Den Haag	2020–21	Eredivisie	15	0	0	0	—		15	0
Schalke 04 II	2021–22	Regionalliga West	1	0	—		—		1	0
Schalke 04	2021–22	2. Bundesliga	26	0	0	0	—		26	0
Arminia Bielefeld	2022–23	2. Bundesliga	29	0	1	0	2 (Note: Appearances in 2. Bundesliga relegation play-offs)	0	32	0
Midtjylland	2023–24	Danish Superliga	7	0	3	0	—		10	0
Mafra	2024–25	Liga Portugal 2	31	0	1	0	—		32	0
Career total			282	1	15	0	2	0	299	1

== Honours ==
Schalke 04

- 2. Bundesliga: 2021–22

Midtjylland

- Danish Superliga: 2023–24
