= Oliver Sørensen =

Danish footballer (born 2002)

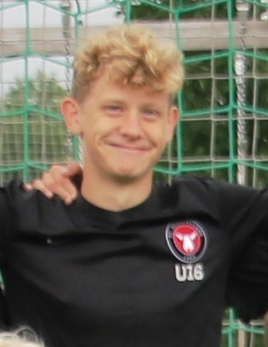
- Sørensen in 2017

Personal information
- Full name: Oliver Sørensen Jensen
- Date of birth: 10 March 2002 (age 24)
- Place of birth: Nørre Aaby, Denmark
- Height: 1.84 m (6 ft 0 in)
- Position: Midfielder

Team information
- Current team: Celtic (on loan from Parma)
- Number: 18

Youth career
- Nørre Aaby IK
- Strib IF
- OKS
- Midtjylland

Senior career*
| Years | Team | Apps | (Gls) |
| 2020–2025 | Midtjylland | 94 | (15) |
| 2021 | → Fredericia (loan) | 11 | (1) |
| 2022 | → HamKam (loan) | 6 | (0) |
| 2025– | Parma | 34 | (1) |
| 2026– | → Celtic (loan) | 4 | (0) |

International career^{‡}
| 2017–2018 | Denmark U16 | 9 | (4) |
| 2018–2019 | Denmark U17 | 11 | (2) |
| 2019–2020 | Denmark U19 | 11 | (2) |
| 2022 | Denmark U20 | 2 | (0) |
| 2023–2025 | Denmark U21 | 15 | (6) |
- * Club domestic league appearances and goals as of 11 October 2026 ‡ National team caps and goals as of 22 June 2025

Oliver Sørensen Jensen (born 10 March 2002) is a Danish professional footballer who plays as a midfielder for Scottish Premiership club Celtic, on loan from Serie A club Parma.

== Club career ==
=== Midtjylland ===
==== Youth ====
Sørensen started playing football at Nørre Aaby IK, then at Strib IF and later joined OKS in 2013. From there, he joined the academy of FC Midtjylland and on his 15th birthday, he signed a three-year youth contract with the club.

Sørensen already began playing with the U19s at the age of 16 and was shortly after promoted permanently to the U19 squad despite his young age, after signing a new three-year youth contract in August 2018. The talentfull midfielder once again signed a new three-year deal with Midtjylland in June 2019, where it was also agreed, that he would become a permanent part of the Danish Superliga squad from the 2020–21 season.

==== FC Midtjylland ====
On 28 June 2020, Sørensen made his official debut for Midtjylland against F.C. Copenhagen in the Danish Superliga. Sørensen started on the bench, but replaced Anders Dreyer in the 88th minute. Sørensen was also subbed in a month later in the second-last game of the season against Brøndby IF.

==== Loan spells ====
In the first half part of the 2020–21 season, Sørensen continued to train with the first team but did only play for the U19s. To gain some more experience, Sørensen was on 26 January 2020 loaned out to Midtjylland affiliate club, Danish 1st Division-side FC Fredericia, for the rest of the season. Sørensen had a good spell at Fredericia, where he played 11 games and scored one goal. Sørensen returned to Midtjylland for the 2021–22 season.

On 31 March 2022, Sørensen was loaned out to Norwegian club HamKam until the end of the year. Two days later, he made his Eliteserien debut against Lillestrøm SK. However, Midtjylland decided to recall Sørensen on 16 June 2022, presumably due to lack of playing time. Sørensen managed to play just 275 minutes over 6 matches.

==== Back at Midtjylland ====
After a season where Sørensen was a big part of Midtjylland's success, winning the 2023–24 Danish Superliga title, the Dane was named FC Midtjylland's Player of the Year and Find of the Year.

=== Parma ===
On 12 August 2025, Sørensen signed a five-season contract with Parma in Italy.

==== Loan to Celtic ====
On 1 September 2026, Sørensen signed on loan with Celtic in Scotland until the end of the season with an option to buy. Sørensen made his Celtic debut the following day, appearing as a substitute in a 3–0 win over Aberdeen.

== International career ==
Sørensen represented Denmark at the 2025 UEFA European Under-21 Championship, where they reached quarter-finals.

== Career statistics ==
As of match played 22 October 2026

Appearances and goals by club, season and competition
| Club | Season | League | | | National cup | | League cup | | Europe | | Total | |
| Club | Season | Division | Apps | Goals | Apps | Goals | Apps | Goals | Apps | Goals | Apps | Goals |
|---|---|---|---|---|---|---|---|---|---|---|---|---|
| Midtjylland | 2019–20 | Danish Superliga | 2 | 0 | 0 | 0 | — | | 0 | 0 | 2 | 0 |
| Midtjylland | 2021–22 | Danish Superliga | 4 | 0 | 3 | 0 | — | | 1 (Note: Appearance(s) in UEFA Europa League) | 0 | 8 | 0 |
| Midtjylland | 2022–23 | Danish Superliga | 27 | 1 | 2 | 0 | — | | 8 (Note: Three appearances in UEFA Champions League, five appearances in UEFA Europa League) | 0 | 37 | 1 |
| Midtjylland | 2023–24 | Danish Superliga | 30 | 5 | 2 | 0 | — | | 6 (Note: Appearances in UEFA Europa Conference League) | 0 | 38 | 5 |
| Midtjylland | 2024–25 | Danish Superliga | 28 | 9 | 1 | 0 | — | | 12 (Note: Five appearances and one goal in UEFA Champions League, seven appearances in UEFA Europa League) | 1 | 41 | 10 |
| Midtjylland | 2025–26 | Danish Superliga | 3 | 0 | 0 | 0 | — | | 3 | 0 | 6 | 0 |
| Midtjylland | Total | | 94 | 15 | 8 | 0 | — | | 30 | 1 | 132 | 16 |
| Frederica (loan) | 2020–21 | Danish 1st Division | 11 | 1 | 0 | 0 | — | | — | | 11 | 1 |
| HamKam (loan) | 2022 | Eliteserien | 6 | 0 | 0 | 0 | — | | — | | 6 | 0 |
| Parma | 2025–26 | Serie A | 34 | 1 | 2 | 0 | — | | — | | 36 | 1 |
| Parma | 2026–27 | Serie A | 0 | 0 | 1 | 0 | — | | — | | 1 | 0 |
| Parma | Total | | 34 | 1 | 3 | 0 | — | | — | | 37 | 1 |
| Celtic (loan) | 2026–27 | Scottish Premiership | 4 | 0 | 0 | 0 | 0 | 0 | 3 | 0 | 7 | 0 |
| Career total | | | 149 | 17 | 11 | 0 | 0 | 0 | 33 | 1 | 193 | 18 |

== Honours ==
Club

- Danish Superliga 2023–2024 with Midtjylland

Individual

- Danish Superliga Team of the Year: 2024–25
