= Emiliano Martínez (footballer, born 1999) =

Uruguayan footballer (born 1999)

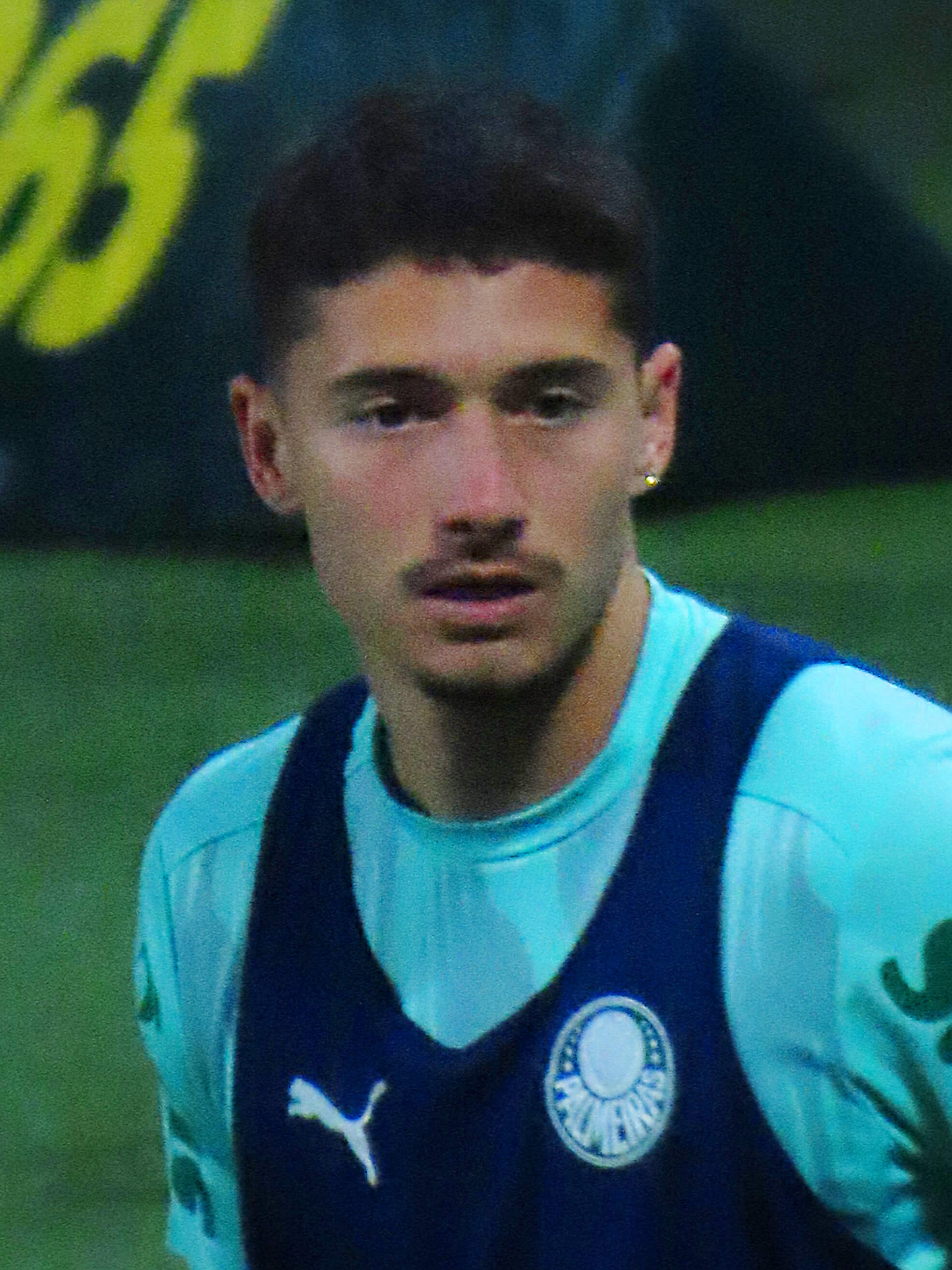
- Martínez with Palmeiras in 2025

Personal information
- Full name: Emiliano Martínez Toranza
- Date of birth: 17 August 1999 (age 27)
- Place of birth: Punta del Este, Uruguay
- Height: 1.84 m (6 ft 0 in)
- Position: Midfielder

Team information
- Current team: Palmeiras
- Number: 32

Youth career
- Charruitas
- Nacional

Senior career*
Years	Team	Apps	(Gls)
2019–2021	Nacional	31	(1)
2021–2022	Red Bull Bragantino	13	(0)
2022	→ Midtjylland (loan)	9	(0)
2022–2025	Midtjylland	46	(0)
2025–	Palmeiras	53	(1)

International career^{‡}
2023–	Uruguay	11	(0)
Medal record
Men's football
Representing Uruguay
Copa América
Third place	2024 United States
- * Club domestic league appearances and goals as of 6 September 2026 ‡ National team caps and goals as of 6 October 2026

Emiliano Martínez Toranza (born 17 August 1999) is a Uruguayan professional footballer who plays as a midfielder for Campeonato Brasileiro Série A club Palmeiras and the Uruguay national team.

== Club career ==
Martínez started his youth football career with Charruitas and joined Nacional later. He was part of Nacional's 2018 U-20 Copa Libertadores winning squad. He made his professional debut for the club on 16 September 2019 in a 4–1 league win against Liverpool Montevideo. On 30 August 2021, Brazilian club Red Bull Bragantino announced the signing of Martínez on a five-year deal.

On 31 August 2022, Martínez joined Danish Superliga club Midtjylland on a season long loan deal with a purchase option. On 16 November 2022, he signed a contract until June 2027 with the club after they exercised their option to buy him on a permanent basis.

== International career ==
In June 2023, Martínez received his first call-up to the senior team for friendly matches against Nicaragua and Cuba. He made his debut on 14 June in a 4–1 win against Nicaragua.

In June 2024, Martínez was named in Uruguay's 26-man squad for the 2024 Copa América. On 31 May 2026, he was named in Uruguay's 26-man squad for the 2026 FIFA World Cup.

== Career statistics ==
=== Club ===
As of match played 12 December 2024

Appearances and goals by club, season and competition
Club	Season	League			Cup		Continental		Other		Total	
Club	Season	Division	Apps	Goals	Apps	Goals	Apps	Goals	Apps	Goals	Apps	Goals
Nacional	2019	Uruguayan Primera División	1	0	—		0	0	0	0	1	0
Nacional	2020	Uruguayan Primera División	21	1	—		8 (Note: Appearances in Copa Libertadores)	0	3 (Note: Two appearances in Championship playoffs and one appearance in Torneo Intermedio final)	0	32	1
Nacional	2021	Uruguayan Primera División	9	0	—		4 (Note: Three appearances in Copa Libertadores and one appearance in Copa Sudamericana)	0	1 (Note: Appearance in Supercopa Uruguaya)	0	14	0
Nacional	Total		31	1	0	0	12	0	4	0	47	1
Red Bull Bragantino	2021	Série A	13	0	0	0	0	0	—		13	0
Red Bull Bragantino	2022	Série A	0	0	0	0	0	0	—		0	0
Red Bull Bragantino	Total		13	0	0	0	0	0	0	0	13	0
Midtjylland (loan)	2022–23	Danish Superliga	9	0	1	0	6 (Note: Appearance(s) in UEFA Europa League)	1	—		16	1
Midtjylland	2022–23	Danish Superliga	15	0	0	0	1	0	1 (Note: Appearance in European play-off)	0	17	0
Midtjylland	2023–24	Danish Superliga	16	0	0	0	6 (Note: Appearances in UEFA Conference League)	0	0	0	22	0
Midtjylland	2024–25	Danish Superliga	15	0	1	0	11 (Note: Five appearances in UEFA Champions League, six appearances in UEFA Europa League)	0	0	0	27	0
Midtjylland	Total		55	0	2	0	24	1	1	0	82	1
Career total			99	1	2	0	36	1	5	0	142	2

=== International ===
As of match played 6 October 2026

Appearances and goals by national team and year
National team	Year	Apps	Goals
Uruguay	2023	2	0
Uruguay	2024	2	0
Uruguay	2025	4	0
Uruguay	2026	3	0
Total		11	0

== Honours ==
Nacional U20

- U-20 Copa Libertadores: 2018

Nacional

- Uruguayan Primera División: 2019, 2020
- Supercopa Uruguaya: 2021

Midtjylland

- Danish Superliga: 2023–24

Palmeiras

- Campeonato Paulista: 2026

Uruguay

- Copa América third place: 2024

Individual

- Uruguayan Primera División Team of the Year: 2020
