= Stefan Gartenmann =

Swiss footballer (born 1997)

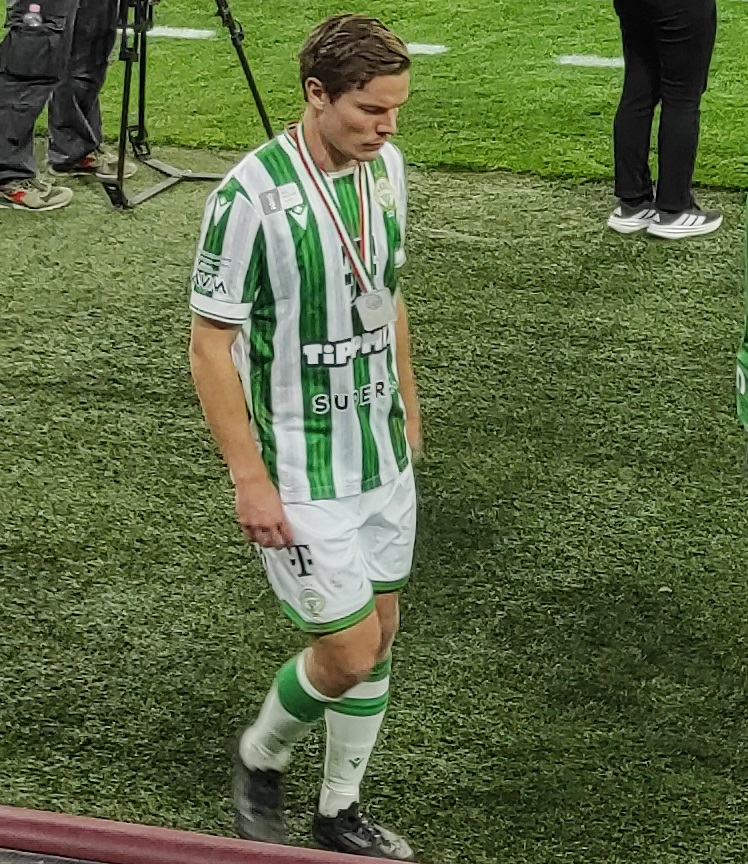
- Gartenmann with Ferencváros in 2025

Personal information
- Date of birth: 2 February 1997 (age 29)
- Place of birth: Roskilde, Denmark
- Height: 1.87 m (6 ft 2 in)
- Position: Centre-back

Team information
- Current team: Sampdoria
- Number: 3

Youth career
- –2013: Roskilde
- 2013–2015: Heerenveen

Senior career*
Years	Team	Apps	(Gls)
2015–2017	Heerenveen	0	(0)
2017–2022	SønderjyskE	150	(8)
2022–2024	Midtjylland	29	(3)
2023–2024	→ Aberdeen (loan)	33	(3)
2024–2026	Ferencváros	34	(4)
2026–	Sampdoria	1	(0)

International career^{‡}
2012	Denmark U16	9	(1)
2013	Denmark U17	11	(2)
2014–2015	Denmark U19	17	(4)
2017	Denmark U20	5	(1)
2019	Denmark U21	2	(0)
2025–	Switzerland	3	(0)
- * Club domestic league appearances and goals as of 23 August 2026 ‡ National team caps and goals as of 10 June 2025

Stefan Gartenmann (born 2 February 1997) is a professional footballer who plays as a centre-back for Serie B club Sampdoria. Born in Denmark, he plays for the Switzerland national team.

== Club career ==
=== Heerenveen ===
Gartenmann moved from the youth academy of FC Roskilde to Dutch club SC Heerenveen in July 2013 – Roskilde's first transfer to a club outside of Denmark – and he initially became a part of the youth teams of the Frisian club. 24 August 2015, Gartenmann made his first appearance as a second-half substitute in the reserves of Heerenveen in a 2–0 win in the Beloften Eredivisie over ADO Den Haag. On 14 September, he scored his first goal for the second team of Heerenveen in a 1–1 draw against the PEC Zwolle reserves with the goal to secure the final score.

Gartenmann signed his first professional contract on 26 October 2015, a three-year contract. However, during his time with the club he did not manage to make an appearance for the senior team in the Eredivisie.

=== Sønderjyske ===
On 5 May 2017, it was announced that Gartenmann would return to Denmark for the 2017–18 season, as he had joined the Danish Superliga club Sønderjyske on a three-year contract. On 7 August 2017, he made his professional debut when he came on as a late substitute for Troels Kløve in a 3–0 win on matchday two of the regular season against AGF. He scored his first goal for Sønderjyske on 28 November 2017 in a 4–1 victory in the round of 16 of the Danish Cup competition against third-tier Danish 2nd Division club Jammerbugt.

On 1 July 2020, Gartenmann was part of the Sønderjyske team winning the 2019–20 Danish Cup by beating AaB in a 2–0 win. The win marked the first trophy in club history. In May 2022 it was confirmed, that Gartenmann would leave the club, as his contract was expiring.

=== Midtjylland ===
On 28 June 2022, it was confirmed that FC Midtjylland had signed Gartenmann on a free transfer, with the player agreeing to a contract until June 2025.

On 1 September 2023, Gartenmann joined Scottish Premiership club Aberdeen on loan for the remainder of the 2023–24 season. He returned to Midtjylland for the pre-season ahead of the 2024–25 season.

=== Ferencváros ===
On 15 August 2024, Hungarian NB1 club Ferencváros announced the signing of Gartenmann. The fee and contract length were undisclosed.

Gartenmann won the 2024–25 Nemzeti Bajnokság I season with Ferencváros after beating Győr 2–1 at the ETO Park on the last match day on 24 May 2025. On 9 May 2026, he won the 2025–26 Magyar Kupa season with Ferencváros by beating Zalaegerszegi TE 1–0 in the 2026 Magyar Kupa final at Puskás Aréna.

== International career ==
On 2 October 2012, Gartenmann played for the first time for the Denmark under-16 team in a 4–2 win in a test match in Lhota, Kladno against the Czech Republic. He was used in nine games at under-16 level. On 5 August 2013, he gained his first of eleven total caps for Denmark at under-17 level in a 4–0 win during a tournament in Norway against Sweden. After he was not used for Denmark under-18, Gartenmann finally appeared in his first game for the Denmark under-19 on 4 September 2014 in a 2–1 win in the friendly against Norway in Lyngdal. In this game he scored his first goal for this age group with the goal to 2–0. The qualification for the 2016 UEFA European Under-19 Championship was missed; Gartenmann played his last game on 15 November 2015 in a goalless draw in the European Championship qualifier against Israel in Hamrun, Malta. On 7 October 2017, Gartenmann played his last of six games for the under-20 team, in a 2–2 draw in a friendly against Sweden in Södra Sandby.

Gartenmann is of Swiss descent through a grandfather, and gained Swiss citizenship in March 2025. On 12 March 2025, his request to switch international allegiance to Switzerland was approved by FIFA. He received his first call-up to the national team the next day.

== Career statistics ==
=== Club ===
As of 19 May 2024

Appearances and goals by club, season and competition
Club	Season	League			National cup (Note: Includes Danish Cup, Scottish FA Cup)		League cup (Note: Includes Scottish League Cup)		Other		Total	
Club	Season	Division	Apps	Goals	Apps	Goals	Apps	Goals	Apps	Goals	Apps	Goals
Sønderjyske	2017–18	Danish Superliga	27	0	2	1	—		0	0	29	1
Sønderjyske	2018–19	Danish Superliga	33	4	2	0	—		0	0	35	4
Sønderjyske	2019–20	Danish Superliga	29	1	5	0	—		0	0	34	1
Sønderjyske	2020–21	Danish Superliga	30	1	6	1	—		1 (Note: Appearance(s) in UEFA Europa League)	0	36	2
Sønderjyske	2021–22	Danish Superliga	31	2	7	0	—		0	0	38	2
Sønderjyske	Total		150	8	22	2	—		1	0	172	10
Midtjylland	2022–23	Danish Superliga	26	3	2	1	—		3	0	31	4
Midtjylland	2023–24	Danish Superliga	3	0	0	0	—		4 (Note: Appearances in UEFA Europa Conference League)	0	7	0
Midtjylland	Total		29	3	2	1	—		7	0	38	4
Aberdeen (loan)	2023–24	Scottish Premiership	33	3	4	0	3	0	5	0	45	3
Career total			212	14	28	3	3	0	13	0	256	17

== Honours ==
Sønderjyske

- Danish Cup: 2019–20

Ferencváros

- Nemzeti Bajnokság I: 2024–25
- Hungarian Cup: 2025–26
