= Paulinho (footballer, born 1995) =

Brazilian footballer (born 1995)

Personal information
- Full name: Paulo Victor da Silva
- Date of birth: 3 January 1995 (age 31)
- Place of birth: São Paulo, Brazil
- Height: 1.78 m (5 ft 10 in)
- Position: Left-back

Team information
- Current team: Botafogo
- Number: 29

Youth career
- Santo André

Senior career*
Years	Team	Apps	(Gls)
2014–2018	Santo André	34	(0)
2016	→ Santos (loan)	0	(0)
2017	→ Boa Esporte (loan)	44	(2)
2018	→ São Bento (loan)	16	(0)
2018–2019	Bahia	15	(0)
2019–2026	Midtjylland	149	(5)
2026–	Botafogo	0	(0)
- * Club domestic league appearances and goals as of 17 May 2026

Paulo Victor da Silva (born 3 January 1995), commonly known as Paulinho, is a Brazilian professional footballer who plays as a left-back for Campeonato Brsaileiro Série A club Botafogo.

== Career ==
=== Early career ===
Born in São Paulo, Paulinho began his career with Santo André. He was loaned to Boa Esporte and São Bento, where he played in Série B.

=== Bahia ===
On 3 August 2018, Paulinho signed a three-year contract with Bahia. Three days after his signing, he made his debut in the top flight against Fluminense in 1–1 draw.

=== Midtjylland ===
On 1 July 2019, Paulinho joined Danish Superliga club Midtjylland on a five-year contract. He made his debut as a starter on 12 July 2019, on the first matchday of the 2019–20 season against Esbjerg fB in a 1–0 win. As part of the team, he won the league title that season.

The following season, Paulinho made his UEFA Champions League debut, playing his first match on 26 August 2020, in a qualifier against Ludogorets Razgrad which finished in a 1–0 win for his team.

During Midtjylland's UEFA Europa League campaign of 2021–22, Paulinho featured as a starter in all games.

== Career statistics ==
As of match played 17 May 2026

Appearances and goals by club, season and competition
Club	Season	League			State League		Cup		Continental		Other		Total	
Club	Season	Division	Apps	Goals	Apps	Goals	Apps	Goals	Apps	Goals	Apps	Goals	Apps	Goals
Santo André	2014	—			0	0	0	0	—		7 (Note: Appearances in the Copa Paulista)	0	7	0
Santo André	2015	—			7 (Note: Appearances in the Campeonato Paulista A2)	0	2 (Note: Appearances in the Copa do Brasil)	0	—		0	0	7	0
Santo André	2016	—			11	0	0	0	—		0	0	11	0
Santo André	2017	—			7 (Note: Appearances in the Campeonato Paulista)	0	0	0	—		0	0	7	0
Santo André	2018	—			9	0	0	0	—		0	0	9	0
Santo André	Total				34	0	2	0	0	0	0	0	36	0
Santos (loan)	2016	Série A	0	0	0	0	0	0	0	0	9	0	9	0
Boa Esporte (loan)	2017	Série B	34	2	10 (Note: Appearances in the Campeonato Mineiro II)	1	0	0	—		0	0	44	3
São Bento (loan)	2018	Série B	16	0	0	0	0	0	—		0	0	16	0
Bahia	2018	Série A	7	0	0	0	0	0	1 (Note: Appearances in the Copa Sudamericana)	0	0	0	8	0
Bahia	2019	Série A	2	0	4 (Note: Appearances in the Campeonato Baiano)	0	1	0	1	0	0	0	8	0
Bahia	Total		9	0	4	0	1	0	2	0	0	0	16	0
Midtjylland	2019–20	Danish Superliga	19	1	—		0	0	0	0	0	0	19	1
Midtjylland	2020–21	Danish Superliga	25	0	—		2	0	10 (Note: Appearances in the UEFA Champions League)	0	0	0	37	0
Midtjylland	2021–22	Danish Superliga	23	1	—		6	0	12 (Note: Appearances in the UEFA Champions League, UEFA Europa League and UEFA Europa Conference League)	0	0	0	41	1
Midtjylland	2022–23	Danish Superliga	29	0	—		0	0	12 (Note: Appearances in the UEFA Champions League and UEFA Europa League)	1	0	0	41	1
Midtjylland	2023–24	Danish Superliga	25	1	—		1	0	5 (Note: Appearances in the UEFA Europa Conference League)	1	1	0	32	2
Midtjylland	2024–25	Danish Superliga	12	1	—		0	0	6 (Note: Appearances in UEFA Europa League)	0	0	0	18	1
Midtjylland	2025–26	Danish Superliga	16	1	—		6	0	6	2	—		28	3
Midtjylland	Total		149	5	0	0	15	0	51	4	1	0	216	9
Career total			244	7	48	1	16	0	51	4	17	0	376	12

== Honours ==
Santo André

- Campeonato Paulista Série A2: 2016
- Copa Paulista: 2014

Bahia

- Campeonato Baiano: 2019

Midtjylland

- Danish Superliga: 2019–20
- Danish Cup: 2025–26
