= Jonas Gemmer =

Danish footballer (born 1996)

Personal information
- Full name: Jonas Skjøtt Gemmer
- Date of birth: 31 January 1996 (age 30)
- Place of birth: Hvidovre, Denmark
- Height: 1.83 m (6 ft 0 in)
- Position: Midfielder

Team information
- Current team: Helsingør
- Number: 6

Youth career
- 2000–: Rosenhøj
- Greve
- –2011: HB Køge
- 2011–2013: Midtjylland

Senior career*
Years	Team	Apps	(Gls)
2013–2017	Midtjylland	5	(0)
2016–2017	→ Horsens (loan)	31	(1)
2017–2019	Fremad Amager	37	(0)
2019–2023	Horsens	94	(3)
2019	→ Kolding (loan)	8	(0)
2023–2025	Hvidovre	47	(0)
2025	ÍA Akraness	3	(0)
2026–	Helsingør	7	(0)

International career
2012	Denmark U16	4	(0)
2012–2013	Denmark U17	11	(0)
2013–2014	Denmark U18	3	(0)
2014–2015	Denmark U19	8	(0)
2015	Denmark U20	2	(0)
- * Club domestic league appearances and goals as of 18 June 2026

Jonas Skjøtt Gemmer (born 31 January 1996) is a Danish footballer who plays as a midfielder for Danish 2nd Division side FC Helsingør.

== Club career ==
=== Midtjylland ===
Gemmer made his official debut for Midtjylland on 29 August 2013, in a Danish Cup match against Vendsyssel when he was just 17 years old. His debut in the Danish Superliga came on 16 September 2013, against Nordsjælland, where he was in the starting lineup.

In the 2013–14 season, Gemmer was nominated as the Academy Player of the Year at Midtjylland. The previous year, he won the Under-17 Player of the Year award at the club. Throughout that season, he trained with the first team squad while also playing for the under-19 and reserve squads.

In October 2014, Gemmer was rewarded with a new contract that extended until 2019.

In January 2015, at the age of 18, Gemmer was permanently moved to the first team squad.

==== Loans to Horsens ====
He was first loaned out to Danish 1st Division club Horsens in January 2016 for the remainder of the season, where he made his debut against Vejle on 20 March 2016. He had a second loan spell during the 2016–17 season, and Horsens expressed interest in signing him permanently. However, Gemmer chose to return to Midtjylland and play for a bigger club.

=== Fremad Amager ===
On 30 May 2017, Gemmer signed with Danish 1st Division club Fremad Amager. The week before, Gemmer's teammate from AC Horsens, Nicklas Dannevang, also joined the club.

In September 2018, he suffered an anterior cruciate ligament injurythat sidelined him for 9–12 months.

On 2 August 2019, Fremad Amager announced the termination of Gemmer's contract by mutual consent.

=== Return to Horsens ===
After a trial with Horsens, the club announced on 27 August 2019, that they had signed a three-year contract with Gemmer. He was immediately loaned out to newly promoted Danish 1st Division club Kolding IF to regain match fitness after his anterior cruciate ligament injury. On 4 January 2020, Kolding announced that Gemmer had been recalled by Horsens after the loan spell.

After 103 appearances for Horsens, in what was his third stint at the club, he left at the end of the 2022–23 season.

=== Hvidovre ===
Following Horsens' relegation to the 2023–24 Danish 1st Division, Gemmer joined newly promoted Danish Superliga club Hvidovre IF. The duration of the contract was not disclosed. He made his debut for the club on 21 July 2023, in a Danish Superliga match against his former club, Midtjylland.

On 13 June 2025, it was confirmed that Gemmer, who made 48 appearances for Hvidovre IF, would leave the club at the end of the month, as his contract was also set to expire.

=== ÍA Akraness ===
In July 2025, Gemmer joined Icelandic Besta deild karla club ÍA Akraness on a deal until the end of 2027.

On 11 September 2025, the club announced that Gemmer was not part of the matchday squad ahead of a match against Breiðablik, as he was forced to travel to Denmark for personal reasons. On 23 October 2025, the club then announced that Gemmer had had his contract terminated.

=== FC Helsingør ===
On 2 February 2026, Gemmer joined Danish 2nd Division club FC Helsingør on a free transfer.
