= Benjamin Lund =

Danish footballer (born 1997)

Personal information
- Full name: Benjamin Christian Lynge Lund
- Date of birth: 12 March 1997 (age 29)
- Place of birth: Rønne, Denmark
- Height: 1.80 m (5 ft 11 in)
- Position: Left-back

Team information
- Current team: NB Bornholm
- Number: 5

Youth career
- Knudsker IF
- Rønne IK
- Nordsjælland

Senior career*
Years	Team	Apps	(Gls)
2016–2017	Nordsjælland	7	(1)
2017–2020	Vendsyssel	12	(1)
2019	→ Thisted (loan)	6	(0)
2019–2020	→ B.93 (loan)	15	(1)
2020–2021	B.93	22	(1)
2021–2022	FC Roskilde		
2022–2023	Holbæk B&I		
2023	Greve	11	(2)
2024–	NB Bornholm		

International career
2014	Denmark U-17	2	(0)
2014–2015	Denmark U-18	6	(0)
2015	Denmark U-19	1	(0)
2016	Denmark U-20	1	(0)
- * Club domestic league appearances and goals as of 18:25, 25 July 2024 (UTC)

Benjamin Christian Lynge Lund (born 12 March 1997) is a Danish footballer who plays as a left-back for Copenhagen Series club NB Bornholm.

== Youth career ==
Born and raised in Rønne, Bornholm, Lund started playing football at the age of 3 at local club Knudsker IF. Lund did later also play for Rønne IK, before moving to FC Nordsjælland.

== Club career ==
=== FC Nordsjælland ===
Lund signed a professional contract with Nordsjælland on July 6, 2016, and was promoted to the first team squad at the age of 19.

He got his official debut on August 14, 2016. Lund played the whole match in a 1–3 defeat against OB in the Danish Superliga. Lund's contract expired in the summer 2017, and he didn't get it extended due to the limited playing time. He began training with Viborg FF and Vendsyssel FF after he left FC Nordsjælland.

=== Vendsyssel FF ===
On 13 July 2017 it was announced, that Lund had signed with Vendsyssel FF.

Lund was loaned out to Thisted FC in the Danish 1st Division on 14 January 2019 due to the lack of playing time at Vendsyssel FF. Lund played the first three games of 2019, before he was diagnosed with mononucleosis. He said to the medias, that he would be out for an unknown period of time.

On transfer deadline day, 2 September 2019, Lund was loaned out again, this time to Danish 2nd Division club B.93 for the 2019/20 season. Vendsyssel then confirmed on 12 August 2020, that Lund had left the club.

=== Later career ===
After his loan spell at the club, it was confirmed on 28 August 2020, that he would continue at the club on a permanent basis.

On 7 June 2021, FC Roskilde confirmed the signing of Lund. After a year in Roskilde, Lund moved to Denmark Series club Holbæk B&I. In July 2023, he moved to fellow league club Greve Fodbold.

In January 2024, Lund joined NB Bornholm.
