= Frederik Møller =

Danish footballer (born 1993)

Personal information
- Date of birth: 8 July 1993 (age 33)
- Place of birth: Ikast, Denmark
- Height: 1.80 m (5 ft 11 in)
- Position: Left-back

Youth career
- –2005: Ikast FS
- 2005–2007: Midtjylland

Senior career*
Years	Team	Apps	(Gls)
2012–2015	Midtjylland	10	(0)
2012–2013	→ Hobro (loan)	10	(0)
2015–2017	Horsens	58	(1)
2017–2018	AGF	17	(1)
2018–2020	Silkeborg	55	(1)

International career
2008–2009	Denmark U16	5	(0)
2009–2010	Denmark U17	6	(0)
2010–2011	Denmark U18	9	(0)
2011–2012	Denmark U19	14	(0)
2012	Denmark U20	4	(0)
2013–2014	Denmark U21	4	(0)
- * Club domestic league appearances and goals

Frederik Møller (born 8 July 1993) is a Danish retired footballer who played as a left-back.

== Club career ==
=== FC Midtjylland ===
Møller is a product of FC Midtjylland and their cooperative club Ikast FS. Møller started playing in FC Midtjylland at the age of 12. He was loaned out to Hobro IK in August 2012 until January 2013, where he played 10 league games for the club.

He was moved up to the first team in the summer 2012, after signing a new 5-year contract. However, he didn't play so many games as he expected, and he left the club after 10 years, in the summer 2015.

=== AC Horsens ===
AC Horsens announced in August 2015, that they had signed Møller from FC Midtjylland.

Møller was one out of 15 players in the Danish Superliga, that had played all matches during the first half season in 2016. After a game against Brøndby IF in March 2017, Møller was taken to the hospital after only playing 36 minutes of the game. It turned out he had a concussion and he later said, that he the first three days had laid down in a dark closet where he couldn't do anything.

On 27 June 2017 AC Horsens confirmed, that Møller wouldn't extend his contract and therefore would leave the club.

=== AGF ===
On 2 July 2017, Møller signed with AGF.

=== Retirement ===
After more than a year without a club, 28-year old Møller confirmed on 5 October 2021, that he had retired from professional football, following two heart attacks in the summer of 2020.

== Disease ==
Møller is color blind, and can't see the difference between many colors.
