= Rune Hastrup =

Danish footballer

Personal information
- Full name: Rune Hastrup
- Date of birth: 16 October 1991 (age 35)
- Place of birth: Randers, Denmark
- Height: 1.75 m (5 ft 9 in)
- Positions: Right-back; centre-back

Youth career
- 2006–2010: Randers

Senior career*
Years	Team	Apps	(Gls)
2010–2012	Randers	3	(0)
2012–2017	Hobro	36	(0)
- * Club domestic league appearances and goals

Rune Hastrup (born 16 October 1991) is a Danish retired footballer.

== Career ==
Hastrup undertook an HHX program, pursuing football on the youth team of Randers FC. He played for Randers' youth team from 2006 until 2010, when he moved to the club's professional team.

In 2012, Hastrup signed with Hobro IK. He played his first game for Hobro on 20 May 2013 against Skive IK; he was introduced as an 83rd-minute substitute. On 28 June 2015 his contract with Hobro was extended. His contract was again renewed in May 2016. At the age of only 25, Hastrup announced his retirement from football with plans to instead pursue a civilian career as a real estate agent.

== Private life ==
In his spare time, Hastrup plays a lot of poker. According to Hobro IK's website, his is fan of Chelsea, and his favourite footballer is Frank Lampard.

Hastrup studied Marketing management.
