= Christian Køhler =

Danish footballer (born 1996)

Christian 'TK' Køhler
Personal information
- Full name: Christian Thobo Køhler
- Date of birth: 10 April 1996 (age 30)
- Place of birth: Øregård, Denmark
- Height: 1.77 m (5 ft 10 in)
- Position: Midfielder

Team information
- Current team: Denmark U-16/U-17 (Team Manager)

Youth career
- Hørshom UI
- Nordsjælland

Senior career*
Years	Team	Apps	(Gls)
2016–2017	Nordsjælland	26	(1)
2017–2019	Helsingør	58	(1)
2019–2020	Trelleborg	24	(0)
2020–2021	Esbjerg	4	(0)
2021	Valur	18	(1)
2022	ÍA Akranes	18	(0)
2023–2024	Fremad Amager	5	(0)

International career
2011	Denmark U-16	2	(0)
- * Club domestic league appearances and goals

Christian Thobo Køhler (born 10 April 1996), also known as TK, is a Danish retired footballer who played as a midfielder and current Team Manager of the Danish U-16 and U-17 national teams.

== Club career ==
=== FC Nordsjælland ===
Køhler is a product of FC Nordsjælland, which he joined as a U12 player. He got his FC Nordsjælland debut on 1 May 2016. Køhler played the whole match in a 2–2 draw against Randers FC in the Danish Superliga, where he also scored a goal.

Køhler got his contract extended in the summer 2016 until the summer 2018. After 19 league games for FCN in the 2016/17 season, Køhler became an attractive player on the market. He had interest from FC Helsingør and Viborg FF.

=== FC Helsingør ===
On 13 July 2017, newly promoted Danish Superliga-side FC Helsingør signed Køhler on a two-year contract. Køhler played his first game for the club on 16 July 2017 against Hobro IK. Køhler left the club at the end of the 2018/19 season.

=== Trelleborgs FF ===
On 12 July 2019, Køhler moved abroad and joined Swedish Superettan club Trelleborgs FF.

=== Esbjerg fB ===
After one year in Sweden, Køhler returned to Denmark and signed a one-year deal with newly relegated Danish 1st Division club Esbjerg fB. On 26 March 2021, three months before time, Køhler's contract was terminated by mutual consent after only playing six games for the club.

=== Valur ===
On 26 March 2021, the same day he terminated his contract with Esbjerg, Køhler signed with Icelandic champions Valur. On 6 October 2021 it was confirmed, that Køhler had left the club at the end of his contract, as the club had to save money due to the lack of qualification to European football.

=== ÍA Akranes ===
On 18 January 2022, Køhler signed a two-year deal with Icelandic club ÍA Akranes.

=== Fremad Amager ===
On 30 January 2023, Køhler returned to Denmark and signed a deal until June 2024 with Danish 1st Division club Fremad Amager.

Køhler made six appearances for Fremad Amager before leaving the club when his contract expired in June 2024.

== Later career ==
On August 29, 2024, it was confirmed that 28-year-old Køhler would end his career as a footballer and instead continue as Team Manager for the Danish U-16 and U-17 national teams, where he would be responsible for budgets related to travel, hotels and basically all non-pitch related matches.

Besides that, Køhler would also spend time on his two businesses: one, together with his former teammate Emiliano Marcondes, where they run Visionary workshops for young athletes on building an identity that is not only based on performance on the pitch. And the other, also with a former teammate, Martin Lauritsen, where they had a business together producing alarm clocks.
