= Jeppe Kjær (footballer, born 1985) =

Danish footballer (born 1985)

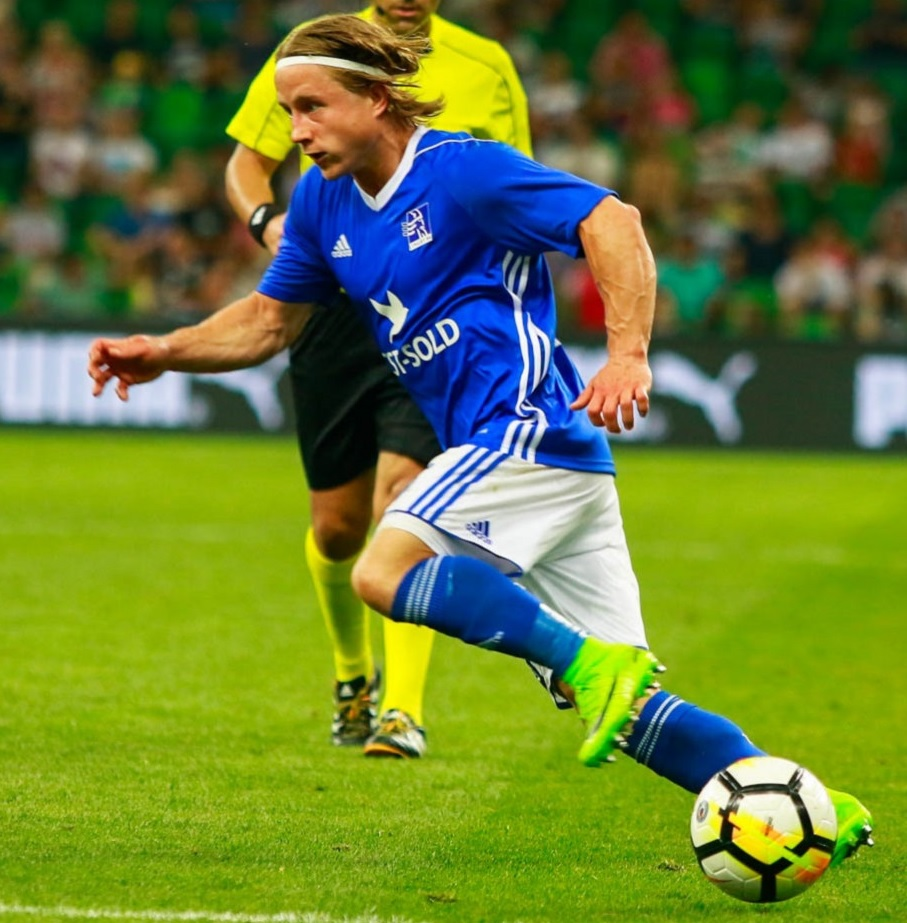
- Kjær with Lyngby in 2017

Personal information
- Full name: Jeppe Borild Kjær
- Date of birth: 6 November 1985 (age 41)
- Place of birth: Roskilde, Denmark
- Height: 1.70 m (5 ft 7 in)
- Position: Forward

Senior career*
Years	Team	Apps	(Gls)
2007–2012	Roskilde	93	(44)
2012–2014	HB Køge	48	(26)
2014–2015	AGF	15	(0)
2015–2019	Lyngby	97	(30)
2019–2021	Helsingør	34	(28)
- * Club domestic league appearances and goals as of 21:39, 21 February 2021 (UTC)

Jeppe Borild Kjær (born 6 November 1985) is a Danish retired footballer.

== Career ==
After leaving Lyngby BK on 25 June 2019, he joined FC Helsingør on 9 July 2019 on a 2-year contract.
