= Nicklas Dannevang =

Danish footballer (born 1990)

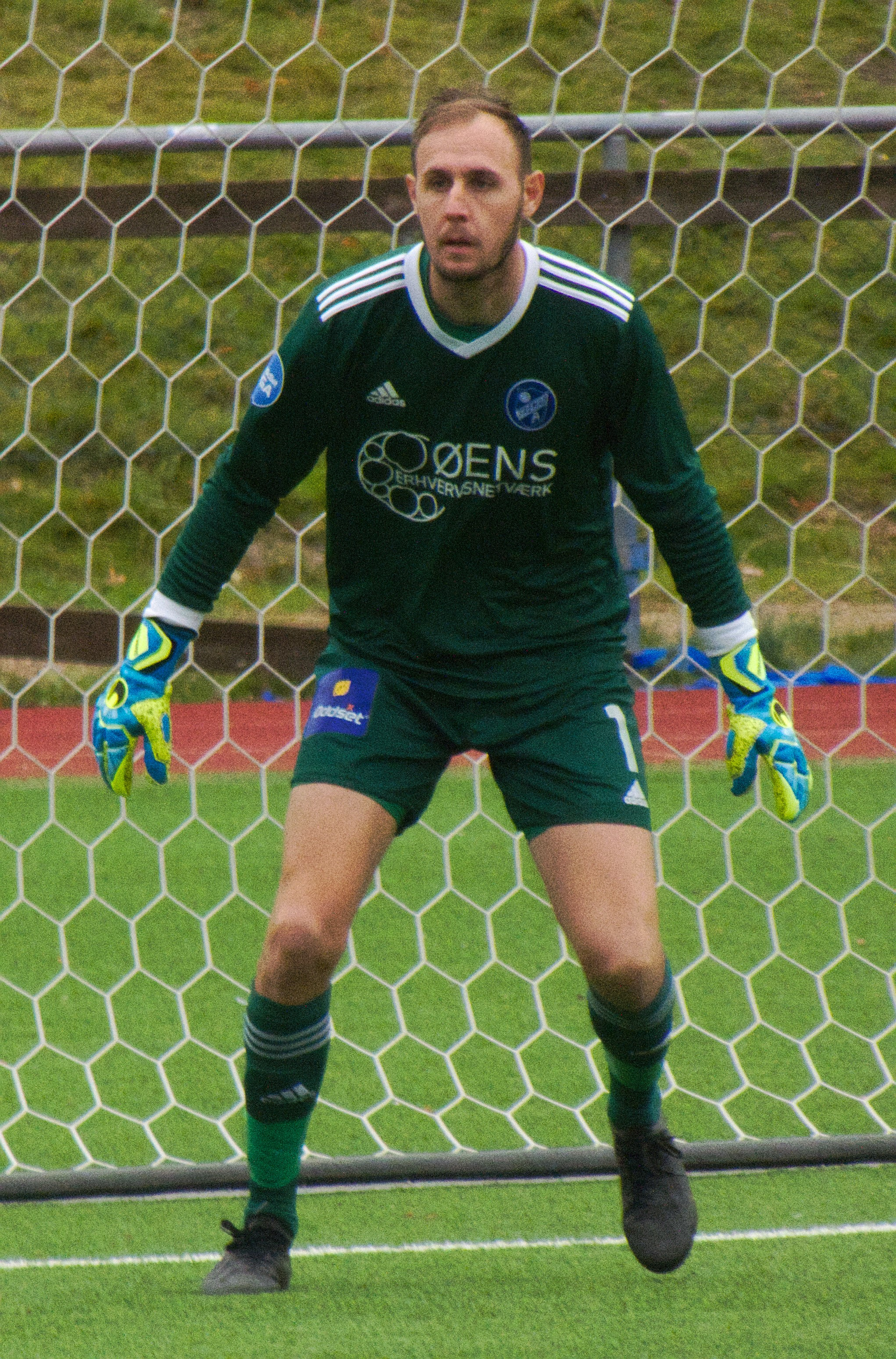
- Fremad Amager goalkeeper Nicklas Dannevang.

Personal information
- Date of birth: 11 September 1990 (age 36)
- Place of birth: Denmark
- Height: 1.95 m (6 ft 5 in)
- Position: Goalkeeper

Team information
- Current team: Sundby BK
- Number: 24

Youth career
- –2008: Hvidovre IF
- 2008-2009: FC Roskilde

Senior career*
Years	Team	Apps	(Gls)
2009–2010	Roskilde	3	(0)
2010–2013	Nordvest	61	(0)
2013–2015	Brønshøj	64	(0)
2015–2017	Horsens	55	(0)
2017–2021	Fremad Amager	102	(0)
2021	→ Næstved (loan)	7	(0)
2021–2024	Næstved	87	(0)
2024–	Sundby BK	25	(0)
- * Club domestic league appearances and goals as of 26 June 2026

Nicklas Dannevang (born 11 September 1990) is a Danish professional footballer who plays as a goalkeeper for Danish 3rd Division club Sundby Boldklub.

== Club career ==
=== FC Roskilde ===
Dannevang made his senior debut for FC Roskilde as an 18-year-old in a home game against Skive IK earning a clean sheet in the 2–0 victory.

=== Nordvest FC ===
Dannevang joined Nordvest FC on a one-year contract in the summer 2010. He was the second choice in the first season, but became the first choice after the first season. He left the club in the summer 2013.

=== Brønshøj Boldklub ===
On 8 August 2013 it was confirmed, that Dannevang had signed a one-year contract with Brønshøj Boldklub. After two good seasons, he was sold.

=== AC Horsens ===
AC Horsens confirmed on 22 July 2015, that they had signed Dannevang on a two-year contract.

The manager of the club, Bo Henriksen, announced in May 2017, that Dannevang together with a teammate would be leaving the club in the summer, as their contract expired.

=== Fremad Amager ===
On 24 May 2017 it was confirmed by Fremad Amager, that they had signed Dannevang on a permanent deal. The transfer would be valid from 1 July 2017.

=== Næstved ===
On 1 February 2021, Dannevang was loaned out to Næstved Boldklub for the rest of the season and would sign permanently for the club at the end of the loan spell, where his contract with Fremad Amager also expired.

On 22 August 2024 Næstved confirmed that Dannevang had his contract terminated by mutual agreement.

=== Sundby BK ===
On 2 September 2024 Danish 3rd Division club Sundby Boldklub confirmed that Dannevang joined the club on a deal until the end of the year.
