= 2025–26 FC Midtjylland season =

FC Midtjylland
2025–26 season
- Owner: Anders Holch Povlsen
- Chairman: Cliff Crown
- Manager: Thomas Thomasberg (until 31 August); Mike Tullberg (from 2 September)
- Stadium: MCH Arena
- Superliga: 2nd
- Danish Cup: Winners
- UEFA Europa League: Round of 16
- Top goalscorer: League: Franculino Djú (16); All: Franculino Djú (21)
- Highest home attendance: 11,619 (3 November 2025 vs. AGF)
- Lowest home attendance: 8,331 (24 September 2025 vs. Sturm Graz)
- Average home league attendance: 9,836
- Biggest win: 6–0 (30 November 2025 vs. Nordsjælland)
- Biggest defeat: 0–1 (14 September 2025 vs. Nordsjælland); 1–2 (23 November 2025 vs. Sønderjyske); 1–2 (14 December 2025 vs. Nordsjælland)
Home colours	Away colours	Third colours
- All statistics correct as of 1 March 2026.

The 2025–26 season is FC Midtjylland's 27th season in existence, and its 25th consecutive season in the Danish Superliga, the top tier of football in Denmark. As a result of Midtjylland's second-place finish in the 2024–25 Danish Superliga title, the club will participate in the 2025–26 UEFA Europa League, and will also vie for the 2025–26 Danish Cup.

== Squad ==
As of 8 January 2026

No.	Name	Nat	Position	Since	Date of birth	Signed from
Goalkeepers
1	Jonas Lössl	(Denmark)	GK	2021	1 February 1989	(England) Everton
16	Elías Rafn Ólafsson	(Iceland)	GK	2020	11 March 2000	(Iceland) Breiðablik
Defenders
3	Lee Han-beom	(South Korea)	DF	2023	17 June 2002	(South Korea) FC Seoul
4	Ousmane Diao	(Senegal)	DF	2024	8 June 2004	(Portugal) C.D. Mafra
6	Martin Erlić	(Croatia)	DF	2025	24 January 1998	(Italy) Bologna
13	Adam Gabriel	(Czech Republic)	DF	2023	28 May 2001	(Czech Republic) Sparta Prague
22	Mads Bech Sørensen (captain)	(Denmark)	DF	2023	7 January 1999	(England) Brentford
29	Paulinho	(Brazil)	DF	2019	3 January 1995	(Brazil) Bahia
43	Kevin Mbabu	(Switzerland)	DF	2024	19 April 1995	(England) Fulham
55	Victor Bak	(Denmark)	DF	2020	3 October 2003	(Denmark) Homegrown
Midfielders
8	Philip Billing	(Denmark)	MF	2025	11 June 1996	(England) Bournemouth
11	Darío Osorio	(Chile)	MF	2023	24 January 2004	Club Universidad de Chile
19	Pedro Bravo	(Colombia)	MF	2024	26 November 2004	(Colombia) América de Cali
20	Valdemar Byskov	(Denmark)	MF	2021	25 January 2005	(Denmark) Homegrown
21	Denil Castillo	(Ecuador)	MF	2024	24 March 2004	(Ukraine) FC Shakhtar Donetsk
58	Aral Şimşir	(Turkey) (Denmark)	MF	2021	19 June 2002	(Denmark) Homegrown
80	Dani Silva	(Portugal)	MF	2025	11 April 2000	(Italy) Hellas Verona
Forwards
7	Franculino Djú	(Guinea-Bissau)	FW	2023	28 June 2004	(Portugal) Benfica U23
10	Cho Gue-sung	(South Korea)	FW	2023	25 January 1998	(South Korea) Jeonbuk Hyundai Motors
14	Edward Chilufya	(Zambia)	FW	2022	17 September 1999	(Sweden) Djurgårdens IF
17	Mikael Uhre	(Denmark)	FW	2026	30 September 1994	(United States) Philadelphia Union
41	Mikel Gogorza	(Denmark)	FW	2024	27 September 2006	(Denmark) Homegrown
74	Júnior Brumado	(Brazil)	FW	2019	15 May 1999	(Brazil) Bahia
90	Friday Etim	(Nigeria)	FW	2025	21 May 2002	(Portugal) Mafra

=== Out on loan ===
Note: Flags indicate national team as defined under FIFA eligibility rules; some limited exceptions apply. Players may hold more than one non-FIFA nationality.

No. / Pos. / Nation / Player; — / DF / ENG / Ovie Ejeheri (at Fredericia until 30 June 2026)	No. / Pos. / Nation / Player; — / FW / NOR / Ola Brynhildsen (at Toronto FC until 31 December 2025)

== Transfers ==
=== In ===
Date	Pos.	Nat.	Name	Club	Fee	Ref.
1 July 2025	FW	(Nigeria)	Friday Etim	(Portugal) Mafra	Undisclosed	
4 August 2025	DF	(Croatia)	Martin Erlić	(Italy) Bologna	€5.00M	
26 August 2025	MF	(Denmark)	Philip Billing	(England) Bournemouth	€5.00M	
8 January 2026	FW	(Denmark)	Mikael Uhre	(United States) Philadelphia Union	Free Transfer	

=== Out ===
Date	Pos.	Nat.	Name	Club	Fee	Ref.
10 June 2025	FW	(Brazil)	Marrony	(Brazil) Remo	Free Transfer	
1 July 2025	FW	(Czech Republic)	Jan Kuchta	(Czech Republic) Sparta Prague	€2.0M	
1 July 2025	DF	(Denmark)	Christian Sørensen	(Denmark) Vejle	€290K	
8 July 2025	DF	(Sweden)	Joel Andersson	(Bulgaria) Ludogorets Razgrad	Undisclosed	
17 July 2025	FW	(Nigeria)	Obule Moses	(Faroe Islands) AB Argir	Free Transfer	
13 August 2025	MF	(Denmark)	Oliver Sørensen	(Italy) Parma	€8.00m	
26 August 2025	FW	(Poland)	Adam Buksa	(Italy) Udinese	€5.00m	

=== Loans out ===
Date	Pos.	Nat.	Name	Club	Duration	Ref.
1 July 2025	GK	(England) (Nigeria)	Ovie Ejeheri	(Denmark) Fredericia	30 June 2026	
1 September 2025	MF	(Denmark)	Sofus Johannesen	(Denmark) Fredericia	30 June 2026	

=== Released ===
Date	Pos.	Nat.	Name	Subsequent club	Join date	Ref.

=== New contracts ===
Date	Pos.	Nat.	Name	Contract until	Ref.
1 July 2025	MF	(Zambia)	Edward Chilufya	30 June 2028	
9 July 2025	DF	(Czech Republic)	Adam Gabriel	30 June 2029	

== Non-competitive ==
=== Pre-season friendlies ===
27 June 2025	Midtjylland	2–0	Silkeborg	Ikast
12:00 CEST	Djú 33' 39' (Lössl)	Report		Stadium: Træningsbanen at Dream99

2 July 2025	Midtjylland	2–3	Randers	Ikast
12:00 CEST	Djú 33' (Şimşir); Bjerge 100' (Overgaard)	Report	Albæk 51'; Themsen 74'; Lux 115'	Stadium: Træningsbanen at Dream99

10 July 2025	Dynamo Kyiv	1–3	Midtjylland	Bad Waltersdorf, Austria
16:00 CEST	Pikhalyonok 21'		Franculino 33'; Gogorza 50'; Etim 56' (Chilufya)	Stadium: Thermenstadion

13 July 2025	Slovan Bratislava	1–4	Midtjylland	Bratislava, Slovakia
14:00 CEST	Pokorný 14'		Cruz 8' (o.g.); Osorio 20'; Djú 57'; Etim 80'	Stadium: Tehelné pole

== Competitions ==
Competition	First match	Last match	Starting round	Final position	Record							
Competition	First match	Last match	Starting round	Final position	Pld	W	D	L	GF	GA	GD	Win %
Superliga	20 July 2025	17 May 2026	Matchday 1	Second place	32	16	12	4	72	36	+36	50.00
Danish Cup	17 September 2025	14 May 2026	Third round	Winners	7	5	1	1	16	4	+12	71.43
Europa League	24 July 2025	19 March 2026	Second Qualifying Round	Round of 16	16	12	2	2	34	13	+21	75.00
Total					55	33	15	7	122	53	+69	60.00

Source: Soccerway

Source: Competitive matches

=== Danish Superliga ===
==== Regular season ====
Pos	Team	Pld	W	D	L	GF	GA	GD	Pts	Qualification
1	AGF	22	15	5	2	46	23	+23	50	Qualification for the Championship round
2	Midtjylland	22	13	7	2	58	23	+35	46	Qualification for the Championship round
3	Sønderjyske	22	10	6	6	34	28	+6	36	Qualification for the Championship round
4	Brøndby	22	10	4	8	31	22	+9	34	Qualification for the Championship round
5	Viborg	22	10	3	9	37	35	+2	33	Qualification for the Championship round

Source: Danish Football Association (in Danish), Soccerway
Rules for classification: 1) Points; 2) Goal difference; 3) Goals scored; 4) Away goals scored; 5) Play-off (played on neutral ground if determining teams for different rounds); 6) Draw.

==== Superliga results summary ====
Overall								Home						Away					
Pld	W	D	L	GF	GA	GD	Pts	W	D	L	GF	GA	GD	W	D	L	GF	GA	GD
32	16	12	4	72	36	+36	60	8	6	2	43	24	+19	8	6	2	29	12	+17

Source: Soccerway

==== Results by round - Regular season ====
Matchday	1	2	3	4	5	6	7	8	9	10	11	12	13	14	15	16	17	18	19	20	21	22
Ground	H	H	A	H	A	H	A	A	H	H	A	H	A	H	A	A	H	A	H	A	A	H
Result	D	W	D	D	W	W	W	L	W	W	D	W	W	D	W	L	W	D	W	W	W	D
Position	4	3	4	5	3	2	2	3	2	2	2	2	2	2	1	2	2	2	2	2	2	2
Points	1	4	5	6	9	12	15	15	18	21	22	25	28	29	32	32	35	36	39	42	45	46

Source: http://www.superliga.dk/
A = Away; H = Home; W = Win; D = Draw; L = Loss

==== Championship round ====
Pos	Team	Pld	W	D	L	GF	GA	GD	Pts	
1	AGF (C)	32	19	10	3	62	32	+30	67	Qualification for the Champions League second qualifying round
2	Midtjylland	32	16	12	4	72	36	+36	60	Qualification for the Europa League second qualifying round (Note: The 2025–26 Danish Cup winners (Midtjylland) qualify for the Europa League second qualifying round.)
3	Nordsjælland	32	15	5	12	51	46	+5	50	Qualification for the Conference League second qualifying round
4	Brøndby	32	13	6	13	44	35	+9	45	Qualification for the European play-off match
5	Viborg	32	13	5	14	49	51	−2	44	

Source: Danish Football Association (in Danish), Soccerway
Rules for classification: 1) Points; 2) Goal difference; 3) Goals scored; 4) Away goals scored; 5) Play-off (played on neutral ground if determining teams for different rounds); 6) Draw.
(C) Champions

==== Results by round - Championship round ====
Matchday	1	2	3	4	5	6	7	8	9	10
Ground	H	A	H	A	H	A	A	H	A	H
Result	L	D	D	W	W	W	D	D	D	L
Position	2	2	2	2	2	2	1	1	2	2

Source: http://www.superliga.dk/
A = Away; H = Home; W = Win; D = Draw; L = Loss

==== Regular season ====
20 July 2025 1	Midtjylland	3–3	OB	Herning
18:00 CEST	Djú 45+2' (Lee Han-beom) 85' (Chilufya); Buksa 45+5'; Mbabu (yellow card) 48'; Lee Han-beom (yellow card) 80'	Report	Ganaus 3'; Grot 30'; Owusu (yellow card) 36'; Arp 62' (pen.) (yellow card) 82'; Grubbe (yellow card) 90+10'	Stadium: MCH Arena; Attendance: 9,401; Referee: Morten Krogh

28 July 2025 2	Midtjylland	6–2	Sønderjyske	Herning
19:00 CEST	Djú 17' (Şimşir) 35' (Gabriel) 75' (pen.); Gabriel 27' (Şimşir); Byskov 65' (Djú); Bech 79' (Byskov)	Report	Lyng 9' (Agger); Sommer (yellow card) 77'; Jensen 85' (pen.)	Stadium: MCH Arena; Attendance: 8,861; Referee: Aydin Uslu

3 August 2025 3	AGF	0–0	Midtjylland	Aarhus
19:00 CEST	Links (yellow card) 55'; Mortensen (penalty missed) '66	Report	Edward Chilufya (red card) 28'; Osorio (yellow card) 83'; Byskov (yellow card) 90+2'	Stadium: Ceres Park Vejlby; Attendance: 8,432; Referee: Sandi Putros

10 August 2025 4	Midtjylland	3–3	Fredericia	Herning
14:00 CEST	Şimşir 5' (Silva); Castillo (yellow card) 20'; Djú 42' (Brumado); Castillo 64' (Djú); Silva (yellow card) 90'	Report	Winther 19' (Marcussen); Buch 72' (Simonsen); Dahl 85' (Simonsen)	Stadium: MCH Arena; Attendance: 9,307; Referee: Lasse Læbel Graagaard

17 August 2025 5	Vejle	0–2	Midtjylland	Vejle
19:00 CEST	Velkov (yellow card) 33' (yellow-red card) 89'	Report	Gogorza (yellow card) 43'; Djú (yellow card) 45+3' (goal) 76' (Osorio); Bravo (yellow card) 90+3'; Osorio 90+7' (Şimşir)	Stadium: Vejle Stadium; Attendance: 9,779; Referee: Jakob A. Sundberg

24 August 2025 6	Midtjylland	4–2	Silkeborg	Herning
TBD CEST	Djú 35' (Şimşir); Şimşir 51' (Osorio); Osorio 64' (Júnior Brumado); Gogorza (yellow card) 69' (goal) 81' (Castillo); Júnior Brumado (yellow card) 72'	Report	Ólafsson 32' (o.g.); Freundlich (yellow card) 65'; McCowatt 70'	Stadium: MCH Arena; Attendance: 9,379; Referee: Mads-Kristoffer Kristoffersen

31 August 2025 7	Brøndby	1–3	Midtjylland	Brøndbyvester
20:00 CEST	Villadsen (yellow card) 29'; Fukuda 88'	Report	Bak (yellow card) 2'; Mbabu (yellow card) 24'; Şimşir 60' (Castillo); Castillo (yellow card) 90+3' (goal) 90+7' (Dani Silva); Osorio 90+5' (Djú)	Stadium: Brøndby Stadium; Attendance: 18,552; Referee: Morten Krogh

14 September 2025 8	Nordsjælland	1–0	Midtjylland	Farum
16:00 CEST	Amoako 8'; Janssen (yellow card) 82'; Yirenkyi (yellow card) 90+1'	Report	Bravo (yellow card) 72' (yellow-red card) 86'; Júnior Brumado (yellow card) 90+3'	Stadium: Right to Dream Park; Attendance: 4,613; Referee: Jacob Karlsen

20 September 2025 9	Midtjylland	2–0	Viborg	Herning
18:00 CEST	Diao (yellow card) 6'; Erlić (yellow card) 13'; Billing 79'Júnior Brumado (yellow card) 84'; Bech (yellow card) 90+4'; Cho Gue-sung 90+6'	Report	Anyembe (yellow card) 17'; Kuzmić (yellow card) 69'	Stadium: MCH Arena; Attendance: 11,440; Referee: Sandi Putros

29 September 2025 10	Midtjylland	2–1	Randers	Herning
12:00 CEST	Tullberg (yellow card) 28'; Franculino (yellow card) 32'; Cho Gue-sung 52' (Bech) (yellow card) 58'; Dyhr 63' (o.g.)	Report	Olsen (yellow card) 43' (goal) 46' (Dyhr); Odey (yellow card) 82'	Stadium: MCH Arena; Attendance: 7,964; Referee: Mikkel Redder

5 October 2025 11	Copenhagen	1–1	Midtjylland	Copenhagen
18:00 CEST	Lerager (yellow card) 78'; Garananga 80' (Larsson) (red card) 90+8'	Report	Franculino 18' (Billing) (yellow card) 53'; Júnior Brumado (yellow card) 84'	Stadium: Parken; Attendance: 30,661; Referee: Jakob A. Sundberg

19 October 2025 12	Midtjylland	5–1	Vejle	Herning
18:00 CEST	Byskov 13' (Osorio) 31' (Osorio); Franculino 22' (Şimşir) 55' (Şimşir); Paulinho 28' (Şimşir)	Report	Hujber (yellow card) 66'; Duelund; Lauritsen (yellow card) 75'; Vestergård (yellow card) 75'	Stadium: MCH Arena; Attendance: 9,948; Referee: Jakob Kehlet

26 October 2025 13	Fredericia	0–4	Midtjylland	Fredericia
14:00 CEST	Simonsen (yellow card) 25'; Crone (yellow card) 62'	Report	Franculino 20' (Castillo); Cho Gue-Sung 34' (Castillo); Gogorza 50'; Júnior Brumado 53' (Diao)	Stadium: Monjasa Stadium; Attendance: Svend Funder; Referee: 3,323

3 November 2025 14	Midtjylland	1–1	AGF	Herning
19:00 CET	Billing (yellow card) 2'; Franculino (yellow card) 27' (goal) 81'; Erlić (yellow card) 47'; Tullberg (yellow card) 48'; Castillo (yellow card) 50'	Report	Bech 35' (Yakob) (yellow card) 90+1'; Mortensen (yellow card) 58'; Carstensen (yellow card) 66'	Stadium: MCH Arena; Attendance: 11,619; Referee: Morten Krogh

9 November 2025 15	Randers	0–2	Midtjylland	Randers
16:00 CET	Olsen (yellow card) 18'; Hansen (yellow card) 42'	Report	Billing (yellow card) 36'; Franculino 49' (Şimşir); Castillo 52' (Şimşir); Bech (yellow card) 67'	Stadium: Cepheus Park; Attendance: 4,918; Referee: Jakob A. Sundberg

23 November 2025 16	Sønderjyske	2–1	Midtjylland	Haderslev
18:00 CET	Ingason 16' (Lyng) (yellow card) 80'; Hyseni (yellow card) 86'; Hoppe (yellow card) 90+9'; Qamili 90+10' (pen.)	Report	Şimşir 14' (Mbabu); Mbabu (yellow card) 35'; Bravo (yellow card) 58'; Billing (yellow card) 76' (yellow-red card) 86'; Tullberg (yellow card) 88'; Erlić (yellow card) 90+9'	Stadium: Sydbank Park; Attendance: 5,355; Referee: Mikkel Redder

30 November 2025 17	Midtjylland	6–0	Nordsjælland	Herning
16:00 CET	Diao 3' (Byskov); Osorio 7'; Şimşir 15' (Osorio); Franculino 44' 47' (Şimşir); Byskov 65' (Bech)	Report	Janssen (yellow card) 49'; Salquist (yellow card) 87'	Stadium: MCH Arena; Attendance: 8,870; Referee: Lasse Graagaard

7 December 2025 18	Viborg	3–3	Midtjylland	Viborg
14:00 CET	Brahimi 18' (Beck); Søndergaard (yellow card) 24'; Freriks 37'; Kuzmić (yellow card) 45'; Hoedemakers 90+2' (Beck)	Report	Bech (yellow card) 35' (goal) 87' (Şimşir); Billing (yellow card) 54'; Byskov 58' (yellow card) 81'; Erlić 69' (Billing); Lee Han-beom (yellow card) 90+4'	Stadium: Energi Viborg Arena; Attendance: 7,699; Referee: Mikkel Tykgaard

8 February 2026 19	Midtjylland	2–1	Copenhagen	Herning
16:00 CET	Şimşir 83'; Bak 85'	Report	Gabriel Pereira (yellow card) 29'; Elyounoussi (yellow card) 76' (goal) 90+7' (Claesson)	Stadium: MCH Arena; Attendance: 11,268; Referee: Morten Krogh

15 February 2026 20	OB	1–4	Midtjylland	Odense
TBD CET	Grot 63' (Niemiec); Bojang (yellow card) 73'; Falk (yellow card) 85'	Report	Billing 3'; Júnior Brumado 8' (pen.) 20' (Osorio) 39'; Cho Gue-sung (yellow card) 76'; Erlić (red card) 81'; Byskov (yellow card) 87'	Stadium: Nature Energy Park; Attendance: 6,987; Referee: Mads-Kristoffer Kristoffersen

22 February 2026 21	Silkeborg	0–4	Midtjylland	Silkeborg
TBD CET	McCowatt (yellow card) 33'; Poulsen (yellow card) 45+2'; Ganchas (yellow card) 90+7'	Report	Şimşir 29' (Bak) 66' (Bak); Mbabu (yellow card) 47'; Castillo 48' (Şimşir); Júnior Brumado 73' (Şimşir)	Stadium: JYSK Park; Attendance: 4,077; Referee: Sandi Putros

1 March 2026 22	Midtjylland	0–0	Brøndby	Herning
TBD CET	Júnior Brumado (yellow card) 47'; Osorio (yellow card) 81'; Tullberg (yellow card) 87'	Report	Frøkjær-Jensen (yellow card) 51'; Vallys (yellow card) 64'; Dennis (yellow card) 76'; Divković (yellow card) 81'; Vanlerberghe (yellow card) 81'	Stadium: MCH Arena; Attendance: Jakob A. Sundberg; Referee: 11,572

==== Championship round ====
15 March 2026 23	Midtjylland	0–1	Nordsjælland	Herning
14:00 CET			Nene 90+9'	Stadium: MCH Arena; Attendance: 8,550; Referee: Jonas Hansen

22 March 2026 24	Viborg	1–1	Midtjylland	Viborg
20:00 CET	Hanza 70'		Byskov 53'	Stadium: Energi Viborg Arena; Attendance: 7,334; Referee: Michael Tykgaard

4 April 2026 25	Midtjylland	2–2	Sønderjyske	Herning
18:00 CEST	Şimşir 12'; Osorio 58'		Haidara 83'; Hyseni 89'	Stadium: MCH Arena; Attendance: 9,256; Referee: Jens Maae

12 April 2026 26	Brøndby	1–2	Midtjylland	Brøndbyvester
16:00 CEST	Vallys 90+7' (pen.)		Franculino 65' (pen.); Slisz 81' (o.g.)	Stadium: Brøndby Stadium; Attendance: 22,340; Referee: Morten Krogh

20 April 2026 27	Midtjylland	2–1	AGF	Herning
19:00 CEST	Hansen 83' (o.g.); Emefile 90+3'		Dalsgaard 20'	Stadium: MCH Arena; Attendance: 12,032; Referee: Sandi Putros

23 April 2026 28	Sønderjyske	1–2	Midtjylland	Haderslev
20:00 CEST	Hoppe 40'		Chilufya 24'; Daníel 49' (o.g.)	Stadium: Sydbank Park; Attendance: 5,135; Referee: Mads-Kristoffer Kristoffersen

26 April 2026 29	AGF	0–0	Midtjylland	Aarhus
20:00 CEST				Stadium: Ceres Park Vejlby; Attendance: 11,335; Referee: Jakob Sundberg

4 May 2026 30	Midtjylland	3–3	Viborg	Herning
19:00 CEST	Osorio 36'; Bravo 45+2'; Erlić 80'		Beck 33', 45'; Dorian Jr. 89'	Stadium: MCH Arena; Attendance: 11,906; Referee: Jakob Kehlet

10 May 2026 31	Nordsjælland	0–0	Midtjylland	Farum
14:00 CEST				Stadium: Right to Dream Park; Attendance: 7,214; Referee: Jacob Karlsen

17 May 2026 32	Midtjylland	2–3	Brøndby	Herning
18:00 CEST	Byskov 12'; Gogorza 23'		Lahdo 66'; Fukuda 81'; Binks 90+3'	Stadium: MCH Arena; Attendance: 10,687; Referee: Michael Tykgaard

=== Danish Cup ===
17 September 2025 Third round	AaB	0–3	Midtjylland	Aalborg
18:00 CEST	Kallesøe (yellow card) 45+3'; John (yellow card) 46'	Report	Billing (yellow card) 45+3'; Júnior Brumado 50'; Byskov 63'; Cho Gue-sung 79' (Chilufya)	Stadium: Aalborg Portland Park; Attendance: 4,700; Referee: Aydin Uslu

30 October 2025 Fourth Round	Midtjylland	4–0	Silkeborg	Herning
20:45 CEST	Castillo 70' (Gogorza); Bak 72'; Franculino 77' (Castillo); Freundlich 84' (o.g.)	Report	Westh (yellow card) 57'	Stadium: MCH Arena; Referee: Mads-Kristoffer Kristoffersen

==== Quarter-finals ====
4 December 2025 First leg	Midtjylland	5–1	Nordsjaelland	Herning
19:00 CEST	Júnior Brumado 34' (Lee Han-beom) 37' 52' (pen.); Cho Gue-sung (yellow card) 49'; Lee Han-beom (yellow card) 72'; Gogorza 81'; Mbabu (yellow card) 90'	Report	Janssen (yellow card) 24'; Ankersen 80' (Heyde); Walker (yellow card) 89'	Stadium: MCH Arena; Attendance: 6,970; Referee: Sandi Putros

14 December 2025 Second leg	Nordsjaelland	2–1 (3–6 agg.)	Midtjylland	Farum
18:00 CEST	Amoako 5' (Røjkjær) (red card) 40'; Nene 90+2'	Report	Castillo (yellow card) 40'; Júnior Brumado 46' (Mbabu) (yellow card) 55'; Cho Gue-sung (yellow card) 65'	Stadium: Right to Dream Park; Referee: Jens Maae

==== Semi-finals ====
12 February 2026 First leg	AGF	0–1	Midtjylland	Risskov
19:00 CEST		Report	Lee Han-beom 62' (Şimşir); Cho Gue-sung (yellow card) 70'; Osorio (yellow card) 70'; Diao (yellow card) 84'; Júnior Brumado (yellow card) 90+5'	Stadium: Ceres Park Vejlby; Attendance: 7,804; Referee: Jacob Karlsen

8 March 2026 Second leg	Midtjylland	1–1 (2–1 agg.)	AGF	Herning
18:00 CEST	Júnior Brumado 68'		Tobias Bech 58'	Stadium: MCH Arena; Attendance: 11,265; Referee: Morten Krogh

==== Finals ====
14 May 2026 Final	Copenhagen	0–1	Midtjylland	Copenhagen
15:00 CEST		Report	Lee Han-beom 82'	Stadium: Parken Stadium; Attendance: 35,485; Referee: Lasse Graagaard

=== UEFA Europa League ===
==== Second qualifying round ====
24 July 2025 First leg	Midtjylland	1–1	(Scotland) Hibernian	Herning
19:30 CEST	Şimşir 72'; Bech (yellow card) 90+1'	Report	McGrath 7'; Smith (yellow card) 68'; Iredale (yellow card) 70'; Manneh (yellow card) 86'; Obita (yellow card) 86'; O'Hora (yellow card) 90+1'	Stadium: MCH Arena; Attendance: 8,863; Referee: Robert Schröder (Germany)

31 July 2025 Second leg	Hibernian (Scotland)	1–2 (a.e.t.) (2–3 agg.)	Midtjylland	Edinburgh, Scotland
21:00 CEST	Cadden (yellow card) 25'; Boyle (yellow card) 80'; Bushiri 105+2' (Youan); McGrath (yellow card) 106'; Campbell (yellow card) 113'	Report	Bravo (yellow card) 2'; Osorio 94' (Castillo); Bech (yellow card) 105+1'; Brumado 119' (Mbabu) (yellow card) 120'	Stadium: Easter Road; Attendance: 19,536; Referee: Gustavo Correia (Portugal)

==== Third qualifying round ====
7 August 2025 First leg	Fredrikstad (Norway)	1–3	Midtjylland	Fredrikstad, Norway
TBD CEST	Bjartalíð 77' (Øhlenschlæger)	Report	Djú 14'; Gogorza 32' (Osorio); Castillo 79' (Byskov); Lee Han-beom (yellow card) 82'	Stadium: Fredrikstad Stadion; Attendance: 8,779; Referee: Igor Pajač (Croatia)

14 August 2025 Second leg	Midtjylland	2–0 (5–1 agg.)	(Norway) Fredrikstad	Herning
18:00 CEST	Bech 9'; Paulinho 17' (Gogorza); Gabriel (yellow card) 85'	Report	Molde (yellow card) 89'	Stadium: MCH Arena; Attendance: 8,464; Referee: Julian Weinberger (Austria)

==== Play-off round ====
21 August 2025 First leg	Midtjylland	4–0	(Finland) KuPS	Herning
TBD CEST	Buksa 15' (Osorio); Osorio 19' (Şimşir); Erlić (yellow card) 71'; Brumado 80' ( Bech) 90+1' (Mbabu)	Report	Cissé (yellow card) 40'; Pennanen (yellow card) 76'	Stadium: MCH Arena; Attendance: 7,408; Referee: Srđan Jovanović (Serbia)

28 August 2025 Second leg	KuPS (Finland)	0–2 (0–6 agg.)	Midtjylland	Kuopio, Finland
18:00 CEST	Lötjönen (red card) 38'	Report	Júnior Brumado 51' (pen.); Şimşir 54' (Chilufya)	Stadium: Väre Areena; Attendance: 1,734; Referee: Simone Sozza (Italy)

==== League Phase ====
===== League phase table =====
Pos	Team	Pld	W	D	L	GF	GA	GD	Pts	Qualification
1	(French Football Federation) Lyon	8	7	0	1	18	5	+13	21	Advance to round of 16 (seeded)
2	(The Football Association) Aston Villa	8	7	0	1	14	6	+8	21	Advance to round of 16 (seeded)
3	(Danish Football Association) Midtjylland	8	6	1	1	18	8	+10	19	Advance to round of 16 (seeded)
4	(Royal Spanish Football Federation) Real Betis	8	5	2	1	13	7	+6	17 (Note: Away goals scored: Real Betis 5, Porto 3.)	Advance to round of 16 (seeded)
5	(Portuguese Football Federation) Porto	8	5	2	1	13	7	+6	17	Advance to round of 16 (seeded)

Source: UEFA
Rules for classification: League phase tiebreakers

===== Results by round =====
- Matchday listings solely for opponent identification - match dates/times to be determined

Round	1	2	3	4	5	6	7	8
Ground	H	A	A	H	A	H	A	H
Result	W	W	W	W	L	W	D	W
Position	3	2	1	1	2	2	4	3
Points	3	6	9	12	12	15	16	19

Updated to match(es) played on 29 January 2025. Source: UEFA
A = Away; H = Home; W = Win; D = Draw; L = Loss; P = Postponed

24 September 2025 Matchday 1	Midtjylland (Denmark)	2–0	(Austria) Sturm Graz	Herning
18:45 CEST	Júnior Brumado (yellow card) 4'; Christensen 7' (o.g.); Djú (yellow card) 24'; Billing (yellow card) 45'; Diao 89' (Şimşir)	Report	Malone (yellow card) 45+3'; Aiwu (yellow card) 71'	Stadium: MCH Arena; Attendance: 8,331; Referee: Orel Grinfeld (Israel)

2 October 2025 Matchday 2	Nottingham Forest (England)	2–3	(Denmark) Midtjylland	West Bridgford, Nottinghamshire, England
18:45 CEST	Morato (yellow card) 1'; Ndoye 22' (Gibbs-White); Igor Jesus (yellow card) 73'; Gibbs-White (yellow card) 76'; Wood 90+3' (pen.)	Report	Diao 18' (Bech); Bech 24' (Erlić); Mbabu (yellow card) 55'; Tullberg (yellow card) 60'; Byskov 88' (Osorio); Diao (yellow card) 90+4'	Stadium: City Ground; Referee: Willy Delajod (France)

23 October 2025 Matchday 3	Maccabi Tel Aviv (Israel)	0–3	(Denmark) Midtjylland	Bačka Topola, Serbia
21:00 CEST		Report	Castillo (yellow card) 41'; Franculino 44' (Bak) 84' (Şimşir); Billing (yellow card) 68' (goal) 71' (Erlić); Gogorza (yellow card) 75'; Lee Han-beom (yellow card) 90+2'	Stadium: TSC Arena; Attendance: 687; Referee: Georgi Kabakov (Bulgaria)
Note: Due to the Gaza war, Israeli teams are required to play their home matches at neutral venues until further notice. Therefore, Maccabi Tel Aviv will play their home matches at TSC Arena, Bačka Topola, Serbia, instead of their regular stadium, Bloomfield Stadium, Tel Aviv.

6 November 2025 Matchday 4	Midtjylland (Denmark)	3–1	(Scotland) Celtic	Herning
21:00 CET	Erlić 34' (Gogorza); Gogorza 35'; Franculino 41'	Report	Scales (yellow card) 13'; Hatate 81' (pen.); Bernardo (yellow card) 90'; Maeda (yellow card) 90+5'	Stadium: MCH Arena; Attendance: 10,387; Referee: Nenad Minaković (Serbia)

27 November 2025 Matchday 5	Roma (Italy)	2–1	(Denmark) Midtjylland	Rome, Italy
18:45 CET	El Aynaoui 7' (Çelik); Cristante (yellow card) 52'; El Shaarawy 83' (Bailey); Mancini (yellow card) 89'	Report	Osorio (yellow card) 77'; Erlić (yellow card) 80'; Bech (yellow card) 85'; Paulinho 86' (Şimşir)	Stadium: Stadio Olimpico; Attendance: 61,653; Referee: Nikola Dabanović (Montenegro)

11 December 2025 Matchday 6	Midtjylland (Denmark)	1–0	(Belgium) KRC Genk	Herning
18:45 CET	Cho Gue-sung 17' (Osorio) (yellow card) 47'; Júnior Brumado (yellow card) 41'	Report	Medina (yellow card) 27'; Fink (yellow card) 90+1'	Stadium: MCH Arena; Attendance: 9,820; Referee: Vasilios Fotias (Greece)

22 January 2026 Matchday 7	Brann (Norway)	3–3	(Denmark) Midtjylland	Bergen, Norway
18:45 CET	Holm 19' (De Roeve); Kornvig 68' (pen.); Soltvedt 90+10' (pen.)	Report	Erlić 4' (Billing) 70' (Lee Han-beom); Júnior Brumado 31'; Billing (yellow card) 49'; Osorio (yellow card) 65'	Stadium: Brann Stadion; Attendance: 15,385; Referee: Georgi Kabakov (Bulgaria)

29 January 2025 Matchday 8	Midtjylland (Denmark)	2–0	(Croatia) Dinamo Zagreb	Herning
21:00 CET	Erlić (yellow card) 37'; Şimşir 49' (Osorio); Osorio (yellow card) 59'; Bak 74' (Byskov)	Report		Stadium: MCH Arena; Attendance: 8,297; Referee: Elchin Masiyev (Azerbaijan)

==== Round of 16 ====
The draw for the round of 16 took place on 27 February 2026.

12 March 2026 Round of 16; 1st Leg	Nottingham Forest (England)	0–1	(Denmark) Midtjylland	West Bridgford, Nottinghamshire, England
21:00 CET	Morato (yellow card) 33'	Report	Cho Gue-sung 80'	Stadium: City Ground; Attendance: 29,502; Referee: Rade Obrenović (Slovenia)

19 March 2026 Round of 16; 2nd Leg	Midtjylland (Denmark)	1–2 (a.e.t.) (2–2 agg.) (0–3 p)	(England) Nottingham Forest	Herning
18:45	Erlić 69'	Report	Domínguez 41'; Yates 52'	Stadium: MCH Arena; Attendance: 10,554; Referee: Felix Zwayer (Germany)
	Penalties
	Cho Gue-sung (penalty missed); Şimşir (penalty missed); Chilufya (penalty missed)		(penalty scored) Gibbs-White; (penalty scored) Sangaré; (penalty scored) Williams

== Statistics ==
As of 1 March 2025

=== Appearances and goals ===
No.	Pos	Nat	Player	Total		Superliga		Danish Cup		Europa League	
No.	Pos	Nat	Player	Apps	Goals	Apps	Goals	Apps	Goals	Apps	Goals
1	GK	(Denmark) DEN	Jonas Lössl	9	0	4	0	3	0	2	0
3	DF	(South Korea) KOR	Lee Han-beom	33	0	16+2	0	4	0	7+4	0
4	DF	(Senegal) SEN	Ousmane Diao	23	3	11+2	1	2	0	6+2	2
6	DF	(Croatia) CRO	Martin Erlić	21	4	9+1	1	2	0	9	3
7	FW	(Guinea-Bissau) GNB	Franculino Djú	30	21	17	16	1+1	1	9+2	4
8	DF	(Denmark) DEN	Philip Billing	25	3	14	2	3+1	0	7	1
10	FW	(South Korea) KOR	Cho Gue-sung	27	6	8+8	3	3+1	2	7	1
11	MF	(Chile) CHI	Darío Osorio	33	6	16+2	4	2+1	0	8+4	2
13	DF	(Czech Republic) CZE	Adam Gabriel	13	1	3+4	1	1	0	3+2	0
14	MF	(Zambia) ZAM	Edward Chilufya	14	0	2+4	0	0+1	0	1+6	0
16	GK	(Iceland) ISL	Elías Rafn Ólafsson	31	0	17	0	1	0	12+1	0
17	FW	(Denmark) DEN	Mikael Uhre	2	0	0+2	0	0+0	0	0+0	0
19	MF	(Colombia) COL	Pedro Bravo	35	0	11+7	0	2+2	0	8+5	0
20	MF	(Denmark) DEN	Valdemar Byskov	37	7	3+16	5	3+1	1	6+8	1
21	MF	(Ecuador) ECU	Denil Castillo	34	6	15+2	4	2+1	1	9+5	1
22	MF	(Denmark) DEN	Mads Bech Sørensen	37	4	18+1	2	4	0	14	2
24	MF	(Denmark) DEN	Oliver Sørensen	6	0	2+1	0	0	0	3	0
29	DF	(Brazil) BRA	Paulinho	18	3	2+6	1	4	0	5+1	2
33	MF	(Guinea-Bissau) GNB	Alamara Djabi	1	0	0	0	0	0	0+1	0
38	FW	(Denmark) DEN	Julius Emefile	1	0	0+1	0	0	0	0+0	0
41	FW	(Denmark) DEN	Mikel Gogorza	26	5	5+9	2	1+2	1	4+5	2
43	DF	(Switzerland) SUI	Kevin Mbabu	30	0	10+7	0	1+1	0	7+4	0
55	DF	(Denmark) DEN	Victor Bak	33	3	18+2	0	0+4	1	7+2	2
58	MF	(Turkey) TUR	Aral Şimşir	35	10	16+3	7	2	0	9+5	3
74	FW	(Brazil) BRA	Júnior Brumado	32	15	7+10	5	3+1	5	7+4	5
80	MF	(Portugal) POR	Dani Silva	17	0	4+6	0	0+3	0	1+3	0
90	FW	(Nigeria) NGA	Friday Etim	4	0	0+1	0	0	0	0+3	0
Players who left Midtjylland during the season:
9	FW	(Poland) POL	Adam Buksa	6	2	2+1	1	0	0	3	1

=== Goal scorers ===
Place	Position	Nation	Number	Name	Superliga	Pokalen	Europa League	Total
1	FW	(Guinea-Bissau)	7	Franculino Djú	16	1	4	21
2	FW	(Brazil)	74	Júnior Brumado	5	5	5	15
4	MF	(Turkey)	58	Aral Şimşir	7	0	3	10
5	MF	(Denmark)	20	Valdemar Byskov	5	1	1	7
5	MF	(Chile)	11	Darío Osorio	4	0	2	6
5	FW	(South Korea)	10	Cho Gue-sung	3	2	1	6
5	MF	(Ecuador)	21	Denil Castillo	4	1	1	6
8	FW	(Denmark)	41	Mikel Gogorza	2	1	2	3
9	DF	(Denmark)	22	Mads Bech	2	0	2	4
9	DF	(Croatia)	6	Martin Erlić	1	0	3	4
11	DF	(Brazil)	29	Paulinho	1	0	2	3
11	DF	(Senegal)	4	Ousmane Diao	1	0	2	3
11	MF	(Denmark)	8	Philip Billing	2	0	1	3
14	DF	(Denmark)	55	Victor Bak	0	1	1	2
15	DF	(Czech Republic)	13	Adam Gabriel	1	0	0	1
Opponent Own goal(s)					1	1	1	3
Players who left Midtjylland during the season:
	FW	(Poland)	9	Adam Buksa	1	0	1	2
Total					56	13	29	98

=== Assists ===
Place	Position	Nation	Number	Name	Superliga	Pokalen	Europa League	Total
1	MF	(Turkey)	58	Aral Şimşir	13	0	4	18
2	MF	(Chile)	11	Darío Osorio	6	0	5	11
3	MF	(Ecuador)	21	Denil Castillo	4	1	1	6
4	DF	(Denmark)	22	Mads Bech	2	0	2	4
4	MF	(Denmark)	20	Valdemar Byskov	2	0	3	4
6	FW	(The Gambia)	7	Franculino Djú	3	0	0	3
6	FW	(Zambia)	14	Edward Chilufya	1	1	1	3
6	FW	(Denmark)	41	Mikel Gogorza	0	1	2	3
6	DF	(Switzerland)	43	Kevin Mbabu	1	0	2	3
6	DF	(South Korea)	3	Lee Han-beom	1	1	1	3
6	MF	(Denmark)	8	Philip Billing	2	0	1	3
6	DF	(Denmark)	55	Victor Bak	2	0	1	3
13	FW	(Brazil)	74	Júnior Brumado	2	0	0	2
13	MF	(Portugal)	80	Dani Silva	2	0	0	2
13	DF	(Croatia)	6	Martin Erlić	0	0	2	2
16	DF	(Czech Republic)	13	Adam Gabriel	1	0	0	1
16	DF	(Senegal)	4	Ousmane Diao	1	0	0	1
16	DF	(Brazil)	29	Paulinho	0	1	0	1
Players away on loan:
Players who left Midtjylland during the season:
Total					43	5	24	72

=== Clean sheets ===
Place	Position	Nation	Number	Name	Superliga	Pokalen	Europa League	Total
1	GK	(Iceland)	16	Elías Rafn Ólafsson	6	0	6	12
2	GK	(Denmark)	1	Jonas Lössl	1	2	0	3
Total					7	2	6	15

=== Hat-tricks ===
Player	Against	Result	Date	Competition	Ref
Franculino Djú	Sønderjyske	6–2	28 July 2025	Danish Superliga	
Júnior Brumado	Nordsjælland	5–1	4 December 2025	Danish Cup	
Júnior Brumado	OB	4–1	15 February 2026	Danish Superliga	

=== Disciplinary record ===
Number	Position	Nation	Name	Superliga			Pokalen			Europa League			Total		
Number	Position	Nation	Name	Booked	(yellow card) (yellow-red card)	Sent off (straight red)	Booked	(yellow card) (yellow-red card)	Sent off (straight red)	Booked	(yellow card) (yellow-red card)	Sent off (straight red)	Booked	(yellow card) (yellow-red card)	Sent off (straight red)
3	(South Korea)	DF	Lee Han-beom	2	0	0	1	0	0	2	0	0	5	0	0
4	(Senegal)	DF	Ousmane Diao	1	0	0	0	0	0	1	0	0	2	0	0
6	(Croatia)	DF	Martin Erlić	3	0	1	0	0	0	3	0	0	6	0	1
7	(Guinea-Bissau)	FW	Franculino Djú	4	0	0	0	0	0	1	0	0	5	0	0
8	(Denmark)	MF	Philip Billing	4	1	0	1	0	0	3	0	0	8	1	0
10	(South Korea)	FW	Cho Gue-sung	2	0	0	2	0	0	1	0	0	5	0	0
11	(Chile)	MF	Darío Osorio	2	0	0	0	0	0	3	0	0	5	0	0
13	(Czech Republic)	DF	Adam Gabriel	0	0	0	0	0	0	1	0	0	1	0	0
14	(Zambia)	FW	Edward Chilufya	0	0	1	0	0	0	0	0	0	0	0	1
19	(Colombia)	MF	Pedro Bravo	3	1	0	0	0	0	1	0	0	4	1	0
20	(Denmark)	MF	Valdemar Byskov	3	0	0	0	0	0	0	0	0	3	0	0
21	(Ecuador)	MF	Denil Castillo	3	0	0	1	0	0	1	0	0	5	0	0
22	(Denmark)	DF	Mads Bech Sørensen	3	0	0	0	0	0	3	0	0	6	0	0
41	(Denmark)	FW	Mikel Gogorza	2	0	0	0	0	0	1	0	0	3	0	0
43	(Switzerland)	DF	Kevin Mbabu	4	0	0	1	0	0	1	0	0	6	0	0
55	(Denmark)	DF	Victor Bak	1	0	0	0	0	0	0	0	0	1	0	0
74	(Brazil)	FW	Júnior Brumado	5	0	0	1	0	0	3	0	0	9	0	0
80	(Portugal)	MF	Dani Silva	1	0	0	0	0	0	0	0	0	1	0	0
Total				43	2	2	7	0	0	25	0	0	75	2	2

== Home attendance ==
As of 1 March 2025

Competition	Total	Games	Average
Superliga	98,361	10	9,836
Pokalen	6,970	1	6,970
Europa League	61,570	7	8,796
Total	166,901	18	9,272
