= Valdemar Byskov =

Danish footballer (born 2005)

Personal information
- Full name: Valdemar Byskov Andreasen
- Date of birth: 25 January 2005 (age 21)
- Place of birth: Herning, Denmark
- Height: 1.80 m (5 ft 11 in)
- Position: Attacking midfielder

Team information
- Current team: AZ
- Number: 17

Youth career
- Herning Fremad
- Ikast
- Midtjylland

Senior career*
Years	Team	Apps	(Gls)
2022–2026	Midtjylland	61	(10)
2023	→ Mafra (loan)	1	(0)
2026–	AZ	5	(0)

International career^{‡}
2020–2021	Denmark U16	4	(0)
2021–2022	Denmark U17	14	(2)
2022	Denmark U18	5	(0)
2023–2024	Denmark U19	19	(6)
2024	Denmark U20	4	(0)
2026–	Denmark U21	6	(0)
- * Club domestic league appearances and goals as of 25 October 2026 ‡ National team caps and goals as of 19:18, 6 October 2026 (UTC)

Valdemar Byskov Andreasen (born 25 January 2005) is a Danish professional footballer who plays as an attacking midfielder for Eredivisie club AZ.

== Professional career ==
Byskov is a youth product of Herning Fremad and Ikast, before joining Midtjylland at the age of 13. On 24 February 2020, he signed his first professional contract with Midtjylland. He worked his way up the latter's youth systems before being promoted to their reserves in 2022. He made his professional and senior debut with Midtjylland as a late substitute in a 5–1 UEFA Europa League win over Lazio on 15 September 2022.

On 28 July 2023, Byskov joined Liga Portugal 2 club Mafra on a season-long loan deal. On 3 January 2024 Midtjylland confirmed that the club had recalled Byskov.

== International career ==
Byskov is a youth international for Denmark, having played for the Denmark U18s.

== Career statistics ==
As of match played 25 October 2026

Appearances and goals by club, season and competition
Club	Season	League			National cup (Note: Includes Danish Cup)		Europe		Total	
Club	Season	Division	Apps	Goals	Apps	Goals	Apps	Goals	Apps	Goals
Midtjylland	2022–23	Danish Superliga	5	0	2	0	4 (Note: Appearances in UEFA Europa League)	0	11	0
Midtjylland	2023–24	Danish Superliga	5	0	0	0	—		5	0
Midtjylland	2024–25	Danish Superliga	19	2	2	0	10 (Note: One appearance in UEFA Champions League, nine appearances and two goals in UEFA Europa League)	2	31	4
Midtjylland	2025–26	Danish Superliga	28	7	6	1	16	1	50	9
Midtjylland	2026–27	Danish Superliga	4	1	0	0	5 (Note: One appearance in UEFA Europa League, four appearances and one goal in UEFA Conference League)	1	9	2
Midtjylland	Total		61	10	10	1	35	4	106	15
Mafra (loan)	2023–24	Liga Portugal 2	1	0	0	0	—		1	0
AZ	2026–27	Eredivisie	5	0	0	0	3	1	8	1
Career total			67	10	10	1	38	5	115	16

== Honours ==
Midtjylland

- Danish Superliga: 2023–24
- Danish Cup: 2025–26
