= Malte Heyde =

Danish footballer (born 2007)

Personal information
- Full name: Malte Såby Heyde
- Date of birth: 18 February 2007 (age 19)
- Place of birth: Dragør, Denmark
- Height: 1.89 m (6 ft 2 in)
- Position: Midfielder

Team information
- Current team: Nordsjælland
- Number: 47

Youth career
- –2017: Dragør
- 2017–2025: Nordsjælland

Senior career*
Years	Team	Apps	(Gls)
2025–	Nordsjælland	23	(1)

International career^{‡}
2022–2023	Denmark U16	13	(3)
2023–2024	Denmark U17	15	(1)
2024–2025	Denmark U18	8	(0)
2025–	Denmark U19	11	(0)
2026–	Denmark U20	2	(0)
- * Club domestic league appearances and goals as of 18 October 2026 ‡ National team caps and goals as of 18:25, 4 October 2026 (UTC)

Malte Såby Heyde (born 18 February 2007) is a Danish footballer who plays as a midfielder for Danish Superliga club FC Nordsjælland.

== Club career ==
=== FC Nordsjælland ===
Born and raised in Dragør, Heyde started playin football at Dragør Boldklub. In 2017, Heyde, along with two teammates, Markus Walker and Jes Pelsmark, moved to FC Nordsjælland.

At Nordsjælland, Heyde worked his way up through the club's academy. Along the way, he also represented several Danish youth national teams.

In June 2025, ahead of the 2025–26 season, 18-year-old Heyde was promoted to the first-team squad and was assigned shirt number 47. On 3 August 2025, Heyde was included in the match squad for the first time in a Danish Superliga match against Sønderjyske. In the same match, he also made his debut when he replaced Nicklas Røjkjær for the last few minutes of the game.

== Career statistics ==
As of match played on 18 October 2026

Appearances and goals by club, season and competition
Club	Season	League			Cup		Europe		Other		Total	
Club	Season	Division	Apps	Goals	Apps	Goals	Apps	Goals	Apps	Goals	Apps	Goals
Nordsjælland	2025–26	Danish Superliga	17	0	2	0	—		—		19	0
Nordsjælland	2026–27	Danish Superliga	6	1	1	0	2 (Note: Appearances in UEFA Conference League)	0	—		9	1
Career total			23	1	3	0	2	0	0	0	28	1
