= Adam Gabriel =

Czech footballer (born 2001)

Personal information
- Date of birth: 28 May 2001 (age 25)
- Place of birth: Prague, Czech Republic
- Position: Right-back

Team information
- Current team: Viktoria Plzeň
- Number: 29

Youth career
- 2008–2011: SK Zbraslav
- 2011–2020: Sparta Prague

Senior career*
Years	Team	Apps	(Gls)
2020–2022	Sparta Prague	1	(0)
2022–2023	Hradec Králové	25	(2)
2023–2026	Midtjylland	40	(3)
2026–	Viktoria Plzeň	0	(0)

International career^{‡}
2019	Czech Republic U19	2	(0)
2021–2023	Czech Republic U21	14	(3)
2024–	Czech Republic	1	(0)
- * Club domestic league appearances and goals as of 2 August 2026 ‡ National team caps and goals as of 26 March 2024

Adam Gabriel (born 28 May 2001) is a Czech professional footballer who plays as a right-back for Czech First League club Viktoria Plzeň and the Czech Republic national team.

== Club career ==
Gabriel began his career in the youth ranks at SK Zbraslav, before moving to Sparta Prague. On 10 August 2021, Gabriel made his debut for Sparta Prague, coming on as an 84th-minute substitute in the UEFA Champions League against Monaco.

On 30 May 2022, Gabriel signed for Hradec Králové, with Jan Mejdr going in the opposite direction.

Gabriel moved to Denmark on 23 August 2023 and joined Midtjylland on a five-year contract. He scored his first goal for the club in a 2–1 home win over Lyngby Boldklub.

On 28 August 2026, Gabriel signed a three-year contract with Czech First League club Viktoria Plzeň.

== International career ==
Having represented the Czech Republic at under-19 and under-21 levels, Gabriel debuted for Czech Republic national team in a friendly match against Armenia on 26 March 2024.

== Personal life ==
Gabriel and his twin, Šimon, are sons of former Czech Republic international Petr Gabriel.

== Career statistics ==
=== Club ===
As of match played 27 August 2026

Appearances and goals by club, season and competition
Club	Season	League			Cup		Europe		Other		Total	
Club	Season	Division	Apps	Goals	Apps	Goals	Apps	Goals	Apps	Goals	Apps	Goals
Sparta Prague	2021–22	Czech First League	1	0	1	0	1 (Note: Appearances in UEFA Champions League)	0	0	0	3	0
Sparta Prague II	2021–22	Czech National Football League	23	2	—		—		—		23	2
Hradec Králové	2022–23	Czech First League	26	2	2	0	—		—		28	2
Hradec Králové	2023–24	Czech First League	5	0	0	0	—		—		5	0
Hradec Králové	Total		32	2	2	0	—		—		34	2
Midtjylland	2023–24	Danish Superliga	19	1	3	1	1 (Note: Appearances in UEFA Conference League)	0	—		23	2
Midtjylland	2024–25	Danish Superliga	11	1	0	0	9 (Note: Six appearrances in UEFA Champions League, three appearances in UEFA Europa League)	0	—		20	1
Midtjylland	2025–26	Danish Superliga	8	1	1	0	6 (Note: Appearances in UEFA Europa League)	0	—		15	1
Midtjylland	2026–27	Danish Superliga	2	0	0	0	4	0	—		6	0
Midtjylland	Total		40	3	4	1	20	0	0	0	64	4
Career total			95	7	7	1	21	0	0	0	123	8

=== International ===
As of match played 26 March 2024

Appearances and goals by national team and year
National team	Year	Apps	Goals
Czech Republic	2024	1	0
Total		1	0

== Honours ==
Midtjylland

- Danish Superliga: 2023–24
- Danish Cup: 2025–26

Individual

- Danish Superliga Team of the Month: March 2024
