= Grønkjær =

Grønkjær is a Danish surname. Notable people with the name include:

- Bertil Grønkjær (born 2007), Danish footballer
- Jesper Grønkjær (born 1977), Danish footballer
- Pernille Rose Grønkjær (born 1973), Danish film director
