= Aral Şimşir =

Footballer (born 2002)

Personal information
- Full name: Doğuhan Aral Şimşir
- Date of birth: 19 June 2002 (age 24)
- Place of birth: Køge, Denmark
- Position: Winger

Team information
- Current team: Trabzonspor
- Number: 58

Youth career
- HB Køge
- 2017–2020: Midtjylland

Senior career*
| Years | Team | Apps | (Gls) |
| 2020–2026 | Midtjylland | 99 | (19) |
| 2022 | → Jerv (loan) | 20 | (3) |
| 2022 | → Lillestrøm (loan) | 6 | (0) |
| 2026– | Trabzonspor | 6 | (0) |

International career^{‡}
| 2017–2018 | Denmark U16 | 9 | (3) |
| 2018–2019 | Denmark U17 | 9 | (2) |
| 2019 | Denmark U18 | 2 | (0) |
| 2020 | Denmark U19 | 1 | (0) |
| 2022–2024 | Turkey U21 | 6 | (0) |
| 2026– | Turkey | 2 | (1) |
- * Club domestic league appearances and goals as of 19 September 2026 ‡ National team caps and goals as of 5 October 2026

Doğuhan Aral Şimşir (born 19 June 2002) is a professional footballer who plays as a winger for Süper Lig club Trabzonspor. Born in Denmark, he represents the Turkey national team.

== Club career ==
=== Early life and youth career ===
Şimşir was born in Køge, Denmark, to parents of Turkish origin whose family comes from Sivas Province in central Turkey. In reference to this, he wears the number 58 shirt number, which corresponds to the province's vehicle registration code. He began his youth career with HB Køge before joining the Midtjylland academy at under-15 level in 2017.

=== Midtjylland ===
Şimşir made his Danish Superliga debut for Midtjylland on 1 June 2020 at the age of 17, replacing Anders Dreyer in a 1–0 defeat to AC Horsens. Midtjylland advanced to the championship round, where Şimşir played two more matches for the first team, contributing to the club's title victory.

His first senior goal came on 22 September 2021 in a 5–0 victory over Kjellerup IF in the Danish Cup.

==== Loan spells in Norway ====
In search of regular senior football, he spent 2022 in Norway. He joined Jerv on loan in March and scored his first Eliteserien goal the following month in a 1–0 win over Kristiansund. In August, Midtjylland recalled him and immediately loaned him to Lillestrøm for the rest of the Norwegian season. Midtjylland later described the year as an important stage in his development, with Şimşir himself saying the period helped him mature both on and off the pitch.

==== Return to Midtjylland ====
After returning to Midtjylland, Şimşir increasingly established himself in the first-team squad. On 9 June 2023, Şimşir scored the lone goal in a 1–0 win over Viborg FF in the 2022–23 Danish Superliga European play-off match, securing a berth in the 2023–24 UEFA Europa Conference League. Later that month he signed a long-term contract extension with Midtjylland until 2028.

During the 2023–24 Danish Superliga season, Şimşir featured regularly as Midtjylland won their fourth Danish championship.

In October 2024, during a UEFA Europa League match against Maccabi Tel Aviv, UEFA opened an investigation after allegations that Şimşir had shouted political remarks during a confrontation between the teams. In November 2024, UEFA concluded the case by issuing Şimşir a reprimand for shouting "Free Palestine", while no suspension or further disciplinary action was imposed. Midtjylland stated that it rejected other accusations made during the incident and handled the matter internally.

On 31 January 2025, he extended his contract again, this time until 2029. On 28 February 2026, he was named the Superliga's Player of the Month for February, having scored three goals and provided two assists during the month; at that stage he had eight league goals and 13 assists for the season. Midtjylland won the 2025–26 Danish Cup and finished as league runners-up. In May 2026, with one match of the campaign remaining, Simsir was voted the Superliga's best player of 2025–26 by the players' union Spillerforeningen, by TV 2's Superliga programme Totalfodbold and by the Danish Superliga. He had by then scored nine goals and provided 15 assists in 30 league appearances, and recorded 12 goals and 21 assists in 52 matches in all competitions.

Simsir left Midtjylland having made 145 appearances, scoring 26 goals and providing 40 assists, and having won two trophies with the club.

=== Trabzonspor ===
On 8 July 2026, after ten years at Midtjylland, Simsir signed for Süper Lig club Trabzonspor. In a stock exchange announcement the following day, Trabzonspor stated that it would pay Midtjylland €13 million in seven instalments, with a 15% sell-on clause included in the deal; the figure was lower than the €15 million that had been reported in the Danish media.

== International career ==
Born in Denmark, Şimşir is of Turkish descent. He has represented Denmark internationally, before switching to Turkey with the Turkey under-21s in 2022.

In November 2025, Şimşir received his first call-up to the Turkey senior squad. He subsequently withdrew due to a hamstring injury and missed the World Cup qualifiers against Bulgaria and Spain.

== Career statistics ==
=== Club ===
As of match played 17 May 2026

Appearances and goals by club, season and competition
| Club | Season | League | | | National cup (Note: Includes Danish Cup, Norwegian Football Cup) | | Europe | | Other | | Total | |
| Club | Season | Division | Apps | Goals | Apps | Goals | Apps | Goals | Apps | Goals | Apps | Goals |
|---|---|---|---|---|---|---|---|---|---|---|---|---|
| Midtjylland | 2019–20 | Danish Superliga | 3 | 0 | 0 | 0 | 0 | 0 | — | | 3 | 0 |
| Midtjylland | 2020–21 | Danish Superliga | 0 | 0 | 1 | 0 | 0 | 0 | — | | 1 | 0 |
| Midtjylland | 2021–22 | Danish Superliga | 1 | 0 | 1 | 1 | 0 | 0 | — | | 2 | 1 |
| Midtjylland | 2022–23 | Danish Superliga | 16 | 3 | — | | 1 (Note: Appearance(s) in UEFA Europa League) | 0 | 1 (Note: Appearance in Danish Superliga European play-off) | 1 | 18 | 4 |
| Midtjylland | 2023–24 | Danish Superliga | 25 | 4 | 2 | 0 | 6 (Note: Appearances in UEFA Europa Conference League) | 0 | — | | 33 | 4 |
| Midtjylland | 2024–25 | Danish Superliga | 23 | 3 | 1 | 1 | 13 (Note: Six appearances and two goals in UEFA Champions League, seven appearances in UEFA Europa League) | 2 | — | | 37 | 6 |
| Midtjylland | 2025–26 | Danish Superliga | 31 | 9 | 5 | 0 | 16 | 3 | — | | 52 | 12 |
| Midtjylland | Total | | 99 | 19 | 10 | 2 | 36 | 5 | 1 | 1 | 146 | 27 |
| Jerv (loan) | 2022 | Eliteserien | 20 | 3 | 3 | 0 | — | | — | | 23 | 3 |
| Lillestrøm (loan) | 2022 | Eliteserien | 6 | 0 | — | | — | | — | | 6 | 0 |
| Trabzonspor | 2026–27 | Süper Lig | 0 | 0 | 0 | 0 | 0 | 0 | 0 | 0 | 0 | 0 |
| Career total | | | 125 | 22 | 13 | 2 | 36 | 5 | 1 | 1 | 175 | 30 |

=== International ===
As of match played 5 October 2026

Appearances and goals by national team and year
| National team | Year | Apps | Goals |
|---|---|---|---|
| Turkey | 2026 | 2 | 1 |
| Total | | 2 | 1 |

As of match played 5 October 2026
Turkey score listed first, score column indicates score after each Şimşir goal

List of international goals scored by Aral Şimşir
| No. | Date | Venue | Opponent | Score | Result | Competition |
|---|---|---|---|---|---|---|
| 1 | 5 October 2026 | Stadio Renato Dall'Ara, Bologna, Italy | Italy | 1–1 | 1–3 | 2026–27 UEFA Nations League A |

== Honours ==
Midtjylland

- Danish Superliga: 2023–24
- Danish Cup: 2025–26

Individual

- Danish Superliga Player of the Year: 2025–26
- Danish Superliga Player of the Month: February 2026
- Danish Superliga Team of the Year: 2025–26
