= Darío Osorio =

Chilean footballer (born 2004)

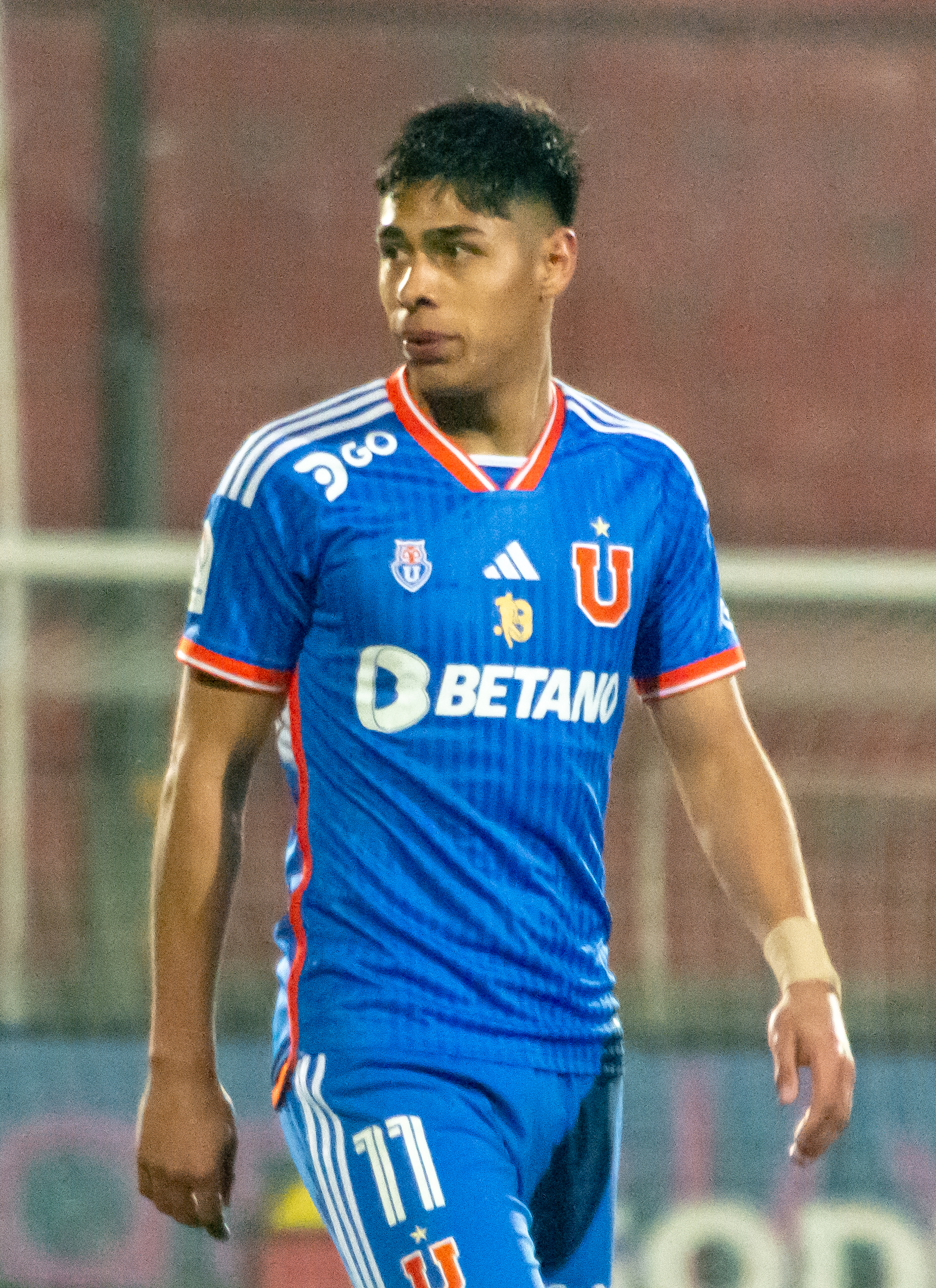
- Osorio with Universidad de Chile in 2023

Personal information
- Full name: Darío Esteban Osorio Osorio
- Date of birth: 24 January 2004 (age 22)
- Place of birth: Hijuelas, Chile
- Height: 1.84 m (6 ft 0 in)
- Positions: Right winger; forward

Team information
- Current team: Crystal Palace (on loan from Midtjylland)
- Number: 24

Youth career
- Santiago Wanderers
- –2015: Escuela Municipal Hijuelas
- 2015–2021: Universidad de Chile

Senior career*
Years	Team	Apps	(Gls)
2021–2023	Universidad de Chile	44	(10)
2023–	Midtjylland	80	(18)
2026–	→ Crystal Palace (loan)	3	(0)

International career^{‡}
2019	Chile U17		
2021–2023	Chile U20	10	(3)
2022	Chile U23	1	(0)
2022–	Chile	28	(3)
- * Club domestic league appearances and goals as of 31 October 2026 ‡ National team caps and goals as of 6 October 2026

Darío Esteban Osorio Osorio (born 24 January 2004) is a Chilean professional footballer who plays as a right winger or forward for Premier League club Crystal Palace, on loan from Danish Superliga club Midtjylland, and the Chile national team.

== Club career ==
=== Universidad de Chile ===
As a child, Osorio was with Santiago Wanderers and Escuela Municipal Hijuelas, but in 2015 he joined Universidad de Chile after a training test in El Melón being recommended by Rubén Farfán who played for the first team. In 2021, he was called up to the first team but he made his professional debut in a 2022 Summer International Tournament played in Argentina, scoring a goal in the match against Colo-Colo.

=== Midtjylland ===
On 31 August 2023, Osorio signed with Danish Superliga side Midtjylland on a deal for five seasons until June 2028.

==== Crystal Palace (loan) ====
On 1 September 2026, Osorio joined Premier League side Crystal Palace on a season-long loan with an option to buy.

== International career ==
Osorio has represented Chile at under-17 and under-20 levels. In December 2021, he represented Chile U20 at the friendly tournament Rául Coloma Rivas, playing three matches and scoring a goal against Paraguay U20. In July 2022, he scored twice in a friendly match against Peru U20. In September 2022, Osorio made an appearance in the Costa Cálida Supercup. In 2023, he made four appearances in the South American U-20 Championship.

Osorio represented Chile at under-23 level in a 1–0 win against Peru U23 on 31 August 2022, in the context of preparations for the 2023 Pan American Games.

At senior level, Osorio made his debut in the 2022 Kirin Cup Soccer match against Tunisia on 10 June 2022.

== Style of play ==
Osorio plays as a right winger or right-sided inside forward. He is known for his ability to drift in-field from wide positions; finding space on the half turn and his fierce striking technique at goal.

== Career statistics ==
=== Club ===
As of match played 31 October 2026

Appearances and goals by club, season and competition
Club	Season	League			National cup (Note: Includes Copa Chile, Danish Cup)		League cup (Note: Includes EFL Cup)		Continental		Total	
Club	Season	Division	Apps	Goals	Apps	Goals	Apps	Goals	Apps	Goals	Apps	Goals
Universidad de Chile	2022	Chilean Primera División	27	7	6	1	—		—		33	8
Universidad de Chile	2023	Chilean Primera División	17	3	1	0	—		—		17	3
Universidad de Chile	Total		44	10	7	1	—		—		51	11
Midtjylland	2023–24	Danish Superliga	23	8	1	0	—		—		24	8
Midtjylland	2024–25	Danish Superliga	24	3	1	0	—		14 (Note: Six appearances and one goal in UEFA Champions League, eight appearances and three goals in UEFA Europa League)	4	39	7
Midtjylland	2025–26	Danish Superliga	28	6	6	0	—		13 (Note: Appearances in UEFA Europa League)	2	47	8
Midtjylland	2026–27	Danish Superliga	5	1	—		—		6 (Note: Two appearances in UEFA Europa League, four appearances and one goal in UEFA Conference League)	1	11	2
Midtjylland	Total		80	18	8	0	—		33	7	120	25
Crystal Palace (loan)	2026–27	Premier League	3	0	0	0	2	0	2	0	7	0
Career total			127	28	15	1	2	0	35	7	179	36

=== International ===
As of match played 6 October 2026

Appearances and goals by national team and year
National team	Year	Apps	Goals
Chile	2022	3	0
Chile	2023	3	0
Chile	2024	9	1
Chile	2025	6	1
Chile	2026	7	1
Total		28	3

Scores and results list Chile's goal tally first, score column indicates score after each Osorio goal.

List of international goals scored by Darío Osorio
No.	Date	Venue	Opponent	Score	Result	Competition
1.	26 March 2024	Stade Vélodrome, Marseille, France	France	2–3	2–3	Friendly
2.	18 November 2025	Fisht Olympic Stadium, Sochi, Russia	Peru	2–1	2–1	Friendly
3.	9 June 2026	Stade de la Source, Orléans, France	DR Congo	1–0	2–1	Friendly

== Honours ==
Midtjylland

- Danish Superliga: 2023–24
- Danish Cup: 2025–26

Individual

- Danish Superliga Goal of the Year: 2024–25
