= Mikel Gogorza =

Danish footballer (born 2006)

Personal information
- Full name: Mikel Johan Gogorza Krüger-Johnsen
- Date of birth: 27 September 2006 (age 20)
- Place of birth: Bergen, Norway
- Height: 1.86 m (6 ft 1 in)
- Position: Left winger

Team information
- Current team: Midtjylland
- Number: 41

Youth career
- B 1903
- BSV
- 2013–2018: Lyngby
- 2018–2021: Copenhagen
- 2021–2024: Midtjylland

Senior career*
Years	Team	Apps	(Gls)
2024–	Midtjylland	45	(6)

International career^{‡}
2023–2024	Denmark U18	7	(0)
2024–	Denmark U19	11	(8)
- * Club domestic league appearances and goals as of 17 May 2026 ‡ National team caps and goals as of 26 March 2025

Mikel Johan Gogorza Krüger-Johnsen (born 27 September 2006) is a Danish professional footballer who plays as a left winger for Danish Superliga club FC Midtjylland.

== Club career ==
=== Early years ===
Gogorza started playing football when he was four years old at B 1903. After a few years, he switched to local club BSV. Here, the offensive player played until the age of eight before moving on to Lyngby BK's youth department.

He spent five years at Lyngby, after which he returned to the Copenhagen football environment to play at U13, U14 and finally U15 for F.C. Copenhagen. Halfway through his time as an U15 player, Gogorza felt it was time to try something new. He then joined FC Midtjylland at the age of 14. After a good start to his new adventure, where Gogorza had scored four goals for his new club in the U15 league, he signed his first contract with Midtjylland, putting his signature on a three-year youth contract in October 2021.

=== FC Midtjylland ===
On 27 September 2023, Gogorza was included in the first team squad for the first time when he was selected for a cup match against Næstved Boldklub, but without playing. In November and December 2023, he was also on the bench for two Danish Superliga matches, again without making his debut.

In January 2024, 17-year-old Gogorza traveled with the first team to Portugal for a training camp. He made his official debut. On 18 February 2024, he came on for the final 11 minutes of the Danish Superliga match against Brøndby IF. At 17 years and 144 days, he became the third-youngest Midtjylland player ever to make his debut.

Ahead of the 2024–25 season, Gogorza was permanently promoted to the first team squad in Midtjylland. In February 2025, he signed a new contract until the end of 2029.

== Personal life ==
Gogorza is of Danish-Basque descent with a mother from Denmark and a father from the Basque Country. Therefore, he has both a Danish and a French passport.

== Career statistics ==
As of match played 17 May 2026

Appearances and goals by club, season and competition
Club	Season	Division	League		National cup		Europe		Other		Total	
Club	Season	Division	Apps	Goals	Apps	Goals	Apps	Goals	Apps	Goals	Apps	Goals
Midtjylland	2023–24	Danish Superliga	1	0	0	0	0	0	—		1	0
Midtjylland	2024–25	Danish Superliga	21	3	2	0	8 (Note: One appearance in UEFA Champions League, seven appearances in UEFA Europa League)	0	—		31	3
Midtjylland	2025–26	Danish Superliga	23	3	3	1	9 (Note: Appearances in UEFA Europa League)	2	—		35	6
Career total			45	6	5	1	17	2	0	0	67	9

== Honours ==
Midtjylland

- Danish Cup: 2025–26

Individual

- Danish Superliga Young Player of the Month: April 2025,
