= Lee Han-beom =

South Korean footballer (born 2002)

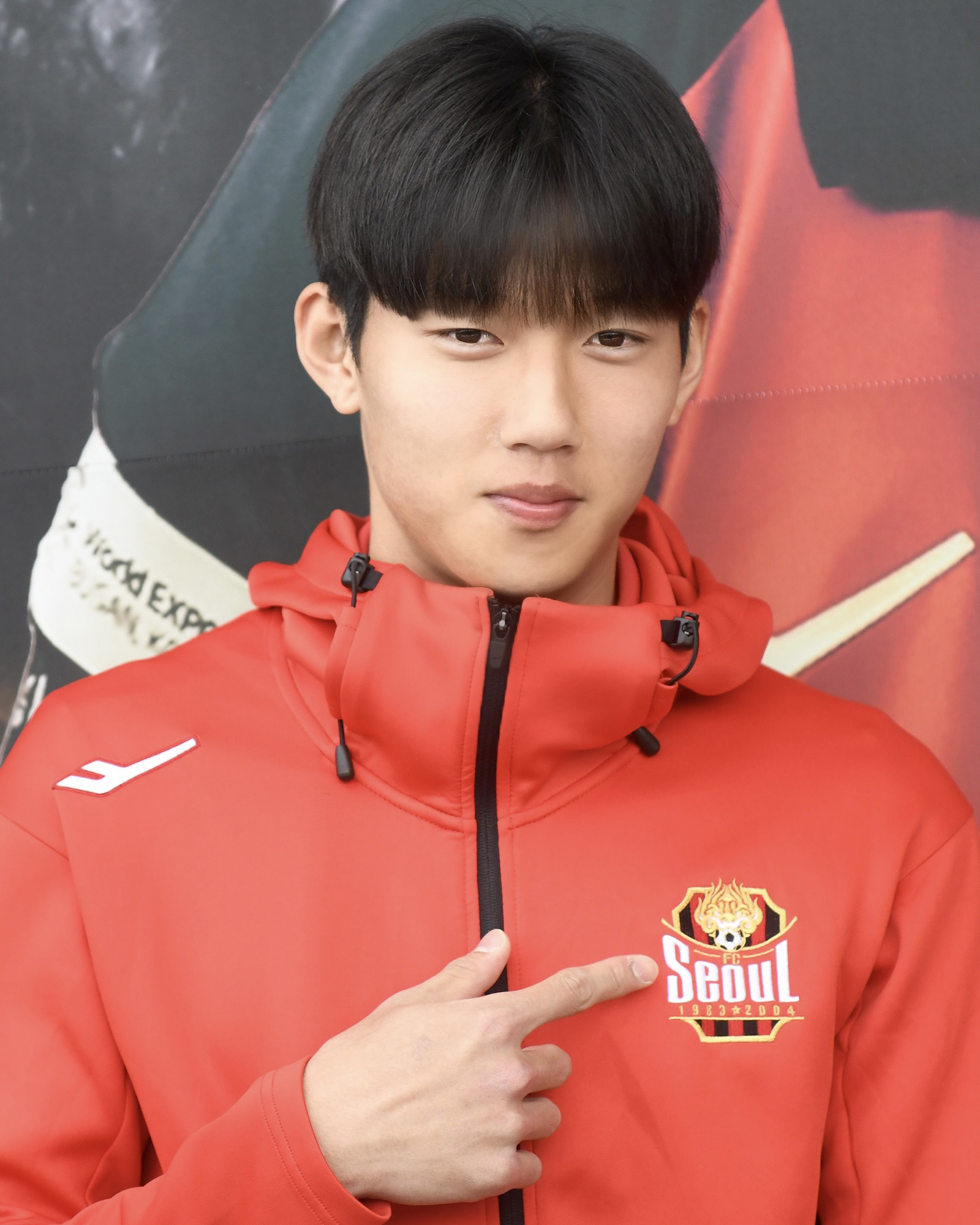
- Lee with FC Seoul in 2023

Personal information
- Date of birth: 17 June 2002 (age 24)
- Place of birth: Daegu, South Korea
- Height: 1.90 m (6 ft 3 in)
- Position: Centre-back

Team information
- Current team: Club Brugge
- Number: 3

Youth career
- 2015–2018: Seil Middle School
- 2018–2021: Boin High School

Senior career*
Years	Team	Apps	(Gls)
2021–2023	FC Seoul	51	(1)
2023–2026	Midtjylland	43	(1)
2026–	Club Brugge	8	(1)

International career^{‡}
2019	South Korea U17	8	(0)
2023	South Korea U23	6	(1)
2025–	South Korea	16	(0)
Medal record
Men's football
Representing South Korea
Asian Games
Gold medal – first place	2022 Hangzhou
- * Club domestic league appearances and goals as of 8 November 2026 ‡ National team caps and goals as of 13 November 2026

- Lee Han-beom
- Hangul: 이한범
- Hanja: 李韓汎
- RR: I Hanbeom
- MR: I Hanbŏm
- IPA: [i.ɦan.bʌm]

Lee Han-beom (Korean: 이한범; born 17 June 2002) is a South Korean professional footballer who plays as a centre-back for Belgian Pro League club Club Brugge and the South Korea national team.

== Club career ==
=== FC Seoul ===
Prior to graduating from Boin High School, Lee joined K League 1 club FC Seoul on 31 December 2020. On 21 April 2021, he made his professional debut in a K League 1 match against Jeju United. In the 2022 season, he played as a main centre-back for the club before having a knee injury in a K League 1 match on 21 August.

=== Midtjylland ===
On 28 August 2023, Lee signed with Danish Superliga club Midtjylland on a four-year contract for a fee reported to be around $1.5 million. On 5 November, he made his debut in a 4–1 away win against Hvidovre, where he assisted the final goal. On 25 February 2024, he scored his first professional goal in a 3–2 win over AGF. However, he made only three appearances in his first season at Midtjylland.

In the 2024–25 season, Lee had played only three matches as a starter during the regular season, but played the last five matches of the championship round after main centre-back Ousmane Diao was sent off in the previous match.

Since his last K League 1 match at Seoul on 19 August 2023, Lee made a 48-match unbeaten run before a 2–1 Superliga loss to Sønderjyske on 23 November 2025. During this time, he earned 40 wins and 8 draws without a loss at clubs and national teams excluding matches from which he was absent. (Note: 1 draw at K League 1, 21 wins and 5 draws at Danish Superliga, 3 wins at Danish Cup, 1 win at UEFA Champions League qualifiers, 4 wins at UEFA Europa League, 3 wins and 1 draw at UEFA Europa League qualifiers, 3 wins and 1 draw at international "A" matches, 5 wins at Asian Games)

In the 2025–26 season, Lee became the club's main centre-back at the Superliga and the Danish Cup. He scored the only goal in the Danish Cup final against Copenhagen, leading his club to win the tournament.

=== Club Brugge ===
On August 3, 2026, Lee officially completed his transfer from FC Midtjylland to Club Brugge on a three year contract until 2029, in which the transfer fee was reported at approximately 10.5million euro.

Lee made his Belgian Pro League on August 8, 2026, where he played the full 90 minuites during Club Bugge's 3-0 victory against KV Kotrtrijk and after he earned man of the match honor and a standing ovation from the home crowd.

On a match against Aston Villa on September 8, 2026, he made a debut at UEFA Champions League, with the result being 2-3 loss.

== International career ==
Lee was South Korea's youth international at the 2019 FIFA U-17 World Cup and the 2022 Asian Games, and won a gold medal at the latter. On 10 June 2025, he made his senior international debut in a World Cup qualifier against Kuwait.

Lee was included in the South Korea squad for the 2026 FIFA World Cup, playing three Group A matches.

== Career statistics ==
=== Club ===
As of match played 8 November 2026

Appearances and goals by club, season and competition
Club	Season	League			National cup (Note: Includes Korean FA Cup, Danish Cup, Belgian Cup)		Continental		Total	
Club	Season	Division	Apps	Goals	Apps	Goals	Apps	Goals	Apps	Goals
FC Seoul	2021	K League 1	10	0	1	0	—		11	0
FC Seoul	2022	K League 1	23	1	2	0	—		25	1
FC Seoul	2023	K League 1	18	0	0	0	—		18	0
FC Seoul	Total		51	1	3	0	—		54	1
Midtjylland	2023–24	Danish Superliga	3	1	0	0	0	0	3	1
Midtjylland	2024–25	Danish Superliga	11	0	1	0	1 (Note: Appearance in UEFA Champions League)	0	13	0
Midtjylland	2025–26	Danish Superliga	29	0	7	2	13 (Note: Appearances in UEFA Europa League)	0	49	2
Midtjylland	2026–27	Danish Superliga	0	0	0	0	2	0	2	0
Midtjylland	Total		43	1	8	2	16	0	67	3
Club Brugge	2026–27	Belgian Pro League	8	1	1	0	2	0	11	1
Career total			102	3	12	2	18	0	132	5

=== International ===
As of match played 13 November 2026

Appearances and goals by national team and year
National team	Year	Apps	Goals
South Korea
South Korea	2025	4	0
South Korea	2026	12	0
Total		16	0

== Honours ==
Midtjylland

- Danish Superliga: 2023–24
- Danish Cup: 2025–26

South Korea U23

- Asian Games: 2022
