= Denil Castillo =

Ecuadorian footballer (born 2004)

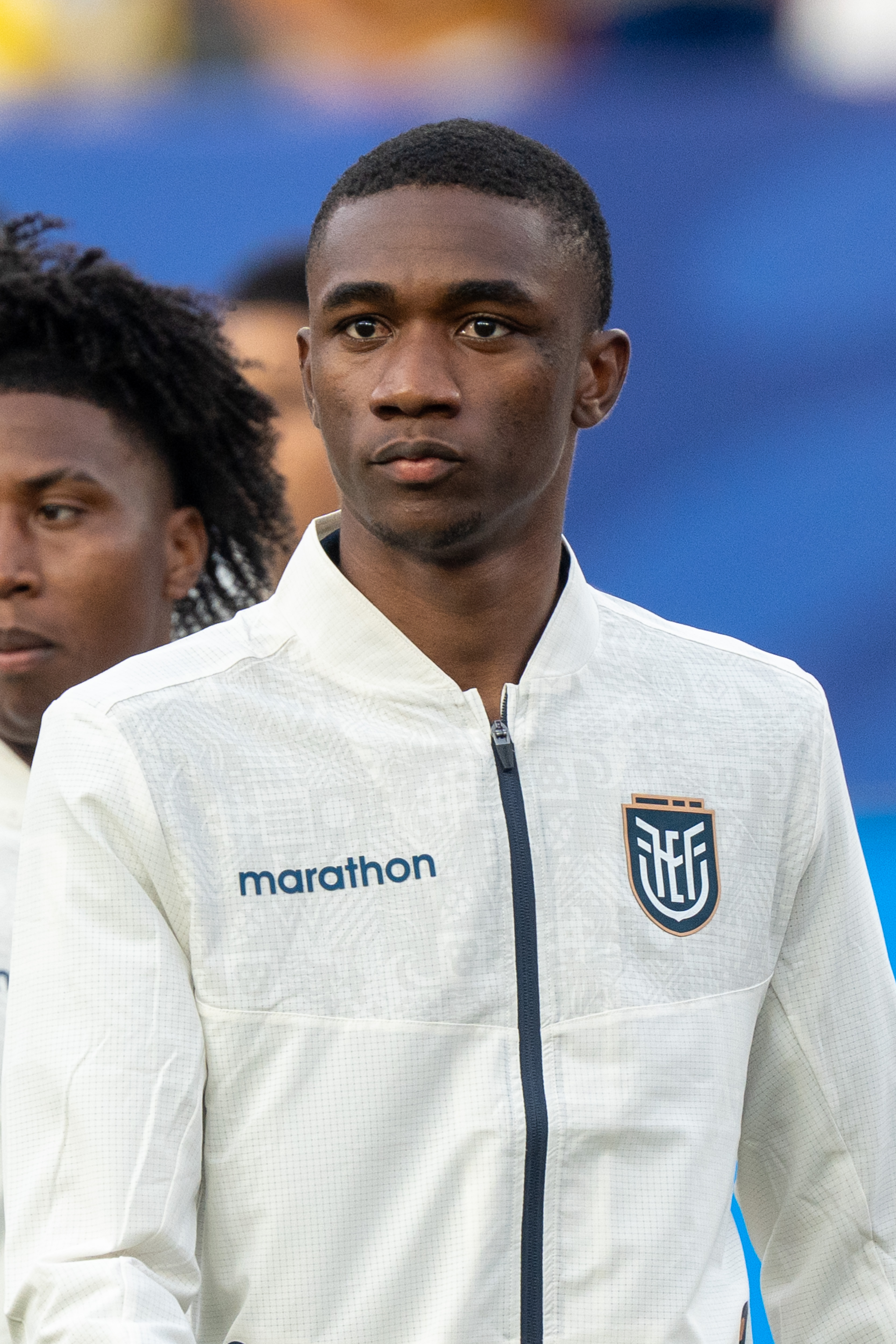
- Castillo with Ecuador in 2026

Personal information
- Full name: Denil Daniel Castillo Preciado
- Date of birth: 24 March 2004 (age 22)
- Place of birth: Eloy Alfaro Canton, Ecuador
- Height: 1.87 m (6 ft 2 in)
- Position: Midfielder

Team information
- Current team: Midtjylland
- Number: 21

Youth career
- LDU Quito

Senior career*
Years	Team	Apps	(Gls)
2020–2023	LDU Quito	0	(0)
2020–2021	→ Atletico Kin	0	(0)
2023–2024	Shakhtar Donetsk	6	(0)
2024	→ Partizan (loan)	14	(2)
2024–	Midtjylland	58	(6)

International career^{‡}
2022–2023	Ecuador U20	18	(0)
2025–	Ecuador	7	(0)
Medal record
Men's football
Representing Ecuador
South American Games
Silver medal – second place	2022 Asunción	Team
- * Club domestic league appearances and goals as of 19 October 2026 ‡ National team caps and goals as of 21:10, 1 October 2026 (UTC)

Denil Daniel Castillo Preciado (born 24 March 2004) is an Ecuadorian professional footballer who plays as a midfielder for FC Midtjylland and the Ecuador national team.

== Club career ==
On 24 April 2023, Shakhtar Donetsk announced that they'd signed Castillo to a five-year contract from LDU Quito, commencing 1 July 2023.

Castillo signed a five-year deal with Danish Superliga side FC Midtjylland for a €4 million transfer fee on 1 July 2024. In March 2026 he extended his contract with Midtjylland until 2031.

== International career ==
Castillo has represented Ecuador at youth level.

On 31 May 2026, Castillo was selected in the 26-man squad for the 2026 FIFA World Cup.

== Style of play ==
Castillo mainly operates as a central midfielder.

== Career statistics ==
=== Club ===
As of match played 19 October 2026

Appearances and goals by club, season and competition
Club	Season	League			National cup (Note: Includes Serbian Cup, Danish Cup)		Continental		Total	
Club	Season	Division	Apps	Goals	Apps	Goals	Apps	Goals	Apps	Goals
LDU Quito	2021	LigaPro Serie A	0	0	0	0	—		0	0
LDU Quito	2022	LigaPro Serie A	0	0	0	0	0	0	0	0
LDU Quito	2023	LigaPro Serie A	0	0	0	0	0	0	0	0
LDU Quito	Total		0	0	0	0	0	0	0	0
Shakhtar Donetsk	2023–24	Ukrainian Premier League	6	0	0	0	0	0	6	0
Partizan (loan)	2023–24	Serbian SuperLiga	14	2	1	0	—		15	2
Midtjylland	2024–25	Danish Superliga	22	0	2	0	13 (Note: Five appearances in UEFA Champions League, eight appearances in UEFA Europa League)	0	37	0
Midtjylland	2025–26	Danish Superliga	26	4	6	1	16 (Note: Appearances in UEFA Europa League)	1	48	6
Midtjylland	2026–27	Danish Superliga	10	2	1	0	7 (Note: Two appearances in UEFA Europa League, five appearances in UEFA Conference League)	0	18	2
Midtjylland	Total		58	6	9	1	35	1	103	8
Career total			78	8	10	1	36	1	124	10

=== International ===
As of match played 1 October 2026

Appearances and goals by national team and year
National team	Year	Apps	Goals
Ecuador	2025	4	0
Ecuador	2026	3	0
Total		7	0

== Honours ==
Midtjylland

- Danish Cup: 2025–26
