= Mads Bech Sørensen =

Danish footballer (born 1999)

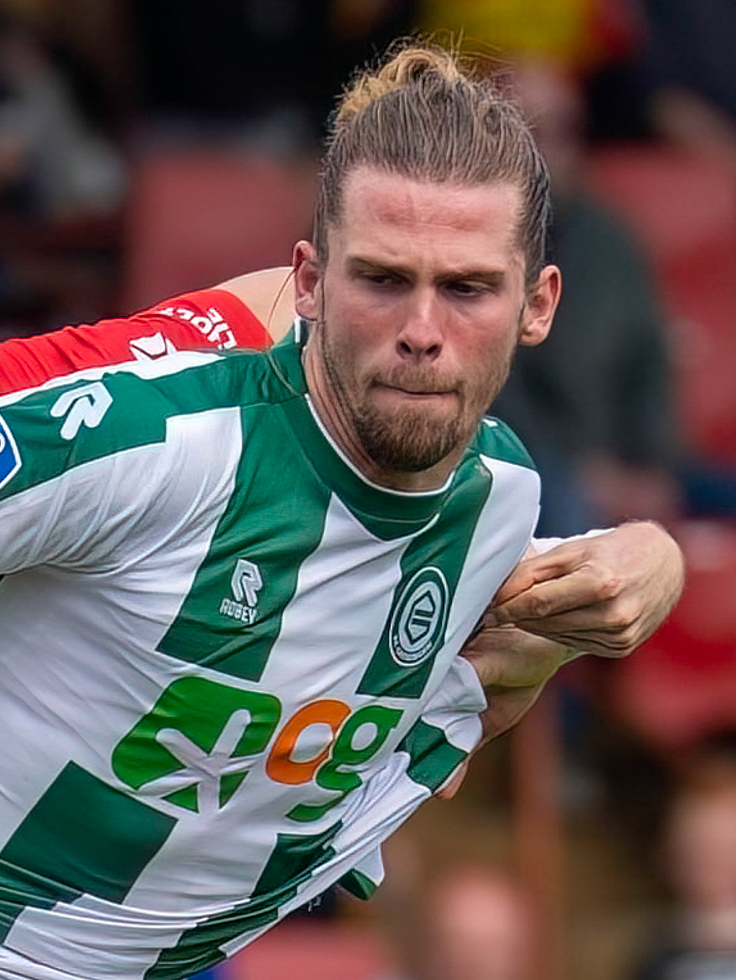
- Bech playing for Groningen in 2023

Personal information
- Full name: Mads Bech Sørensen
- Date of birth: 7 January 1999 (age 27)
- Place of birth: Horsens, Denmark
- Height: 1.89 m (6 ft 2 in)
- Position: Centre-back

Team information
- Current team: Midtjylland
- Number: 22

Youth career
- –2011: Østbirk IF
- 2011–2015: Horsens

Senior career*
Years	Team	Apps	(Gls)
2015–2017	Horsens	20	(1)
2017–2023	Brentford	56	(2)
2020	→ AFC Wimbledon (loan)	9	(0)
2022–2023	→ Nice (loan)	0	(0)
2023	→ Groningen (loan)	11	(0)
2023–	Midtjylland	91	(7)

International career
2016–2017	Denmark U18	7	(1)
2017–2018	Denmark U19	13	(0)
2019–2021	Denmark U21	9	(1)
- * Club domestic league appearances and goals as of 21:01, 19 October 2026 (UTC)

Mads Bech Sørensen (Danish pronunciation: [ˈmæs ˈpe̝k ˈsɶɐ̯ˀn̩sn̩]; born 7 January 1999), sometimes known as Mads Bech, is a Danish professional footballer who plays as a centre-back for and captains Danish Superliga club Midtjylland.

Bech began his career in his native Denmark with Horsens and transferred to Brentford in 2017. Largely a fringe player during six years in England, he returned to Denmark to join Midtjylland in 2023. Bech was capped by Denmark at youth level.

== Club career ==
=== AC Horsens ===
A left-sided central defender, Bech began his youth career with Østbirk IF as a juvenile, before transferring to the academy at AC Horsens in 2011. After progressing through the youth ranks, he won his maiden call into the first team squad for a 1st Division match versus HB Køge on 3 May 2015.

At age 16 years, three months and 26 days, Bech became Horsens' youngest-ever player when he started in the 1–1 draw and he remained on the pitch until being substituted for Malthe Boesen (the player who had previously held the record) after 75 minutes. He made five further appearances during the remainder of the 2014–15 season and signed a new two-year contract on 9 June 2015.

Over the course of the 2015–16 and 2016–17 seasons, Bech continued to make a handful of appearances a season, mostly as a substitute, even after Horsens' promotion to the Superliga in 2016. After signing a new three-year contract in May 2016, Bech made 10 appearances during the 2016–17 season and scored his first senior goal with a consolation in a 3–1 DBU Pokalen last-16 defeat to AGF Aarhus on 15 March 2017.

Bech appeared in Horsens' opening three matches of the 2017–18 season and scored the first league goal of his career in a 4–1 victory over Lyngby on 23 July 2017. Despite that excellent start to the season, he departed the club on 31 July, just two days after his final appearance for the club. In just over two years as a first team player at the CASA Arena, Bech made 25 appearances and scored two goals. While a Horsens player, Bech filled the roles of left back, central defender, left midfield and emerged as a throw-in specialist, after receiving coaching from Thomas Grønnemark.

=== Brentford ===
==== 2017–2019 ====
On 31 July 2017, Bech moved to England to join the B team at Championship club Brentford on a four-year contract for an undisclosed fee. Injuries to first team central defenders John Egan, Andreas Bjelland and Chris Mepham saw Bech feature as an unused substitute on five occasions during the 2017–18 season. He battled with homesickness during the season and adjusting to life in London, but received support on the field from Danish teammate Andreas Bjelland and off it from the club's sleep coach.

Bech was promoted to the first team squad for the 2018–19 season and made his debut for the club with a start in an EFL Cup first round match versus Southend United on 14 August 2018. He was substituted with a dead leg after half an hour of the 4–2 victory. After returning to fitness, a knee injury suffered in October kept Bech out of action for 2 1/2 months. A season-ending injury suffered by central defender Yoann Barbet in late March 2019 allowed Bech to break into the starting lineup and he finished the 2018–19 season with 10 appearances.

==== 2019–20 season and loan to AFC Wimbledon ====
A medial collateral ligament injury suffered prior to Brentford's first friendly of the 2019–20 pre-season kept Bech out until late September 2019. He resumed his involvement with the first team squad in November 2019 and made two appearances before signing a new 3 1/2-year contract (which included the option of a further year) in January 2020.

Down the Brentford defensive pecking order, Bech joined League One club AFC Wimbledon on loan until the end of the 2019–20 season on 9 January 2020. The COVID-19 pandemic and the cancellation of the League One regular season led to his early return from the loan in March 2020. Bech made 9 appearances and helped the Dons to avoid relegation to League Two. Bech was ineligible to play during the remainder of Brentford's 2019–20 season, which ended with defeat in the 2020 Championship play-off final.

==== 2020–21 season ====
After beginning the 2020–21 season restricted to EFL Cup appearances, by November 2020, injury and illness suffered by central defenders Pontus Jansson and new signing Charlie Goode respectively allowed Bech to break into the league lineup alongside Ethan Pinnock. After receiving further coaching from Thomas Grønnemark and extending the length of his throws to 40 metres (44 yd), Bech became the first team's throw-in specialist. On 24 January 2021, Bech scored his first Brentford goal with the opener in a 3–1 FA Cup fourth round defeat to Leicester City. Injury to left back Rico Henry in February 2021 saw Bech deployed in the position until head coach Thomas Frank switched to a 3-5-2 formation in mid-April, at which time he dropped out of the starting lineup.

Bech's breakthrough season was ended prematurely in May 2021, due to the necessary removal of his appendix and a stress fracture to his shin. By that point of the 2020–21 season, he had made 39 appearances, scored three goals and started in all but one match of Brentford's run to the EFL Cup semi-finals. In Bech's absence, Brentford gained promotion to the Premier League after a successful playoff campaign. He was awarded a promotion medal in recognition of his contribution during the regular season.

==== 2021–22 season ====
Bech returned fit for Brentford's 2021–22 pre-season and began the regular season fourth in the central defensive pecking order behind Pontus Jansson, Ethan Pinnock and new signing Kristoffer Ajer. He suffered a medial knee injury on his second appearance of the season, during a 3–1 EFL Cup second round win over Forest Green Rovers on 24 August 2021.

Bech returned to the matchday squad in late November 2021 and had to wait until 22 December to make his comeback, with a start in a 2–0 EFL Cup quarter-final defeat to Chelsea. The departure of Charlie Goode on loan and injuries suffered by Ethan Pinnock and Zanka allowed Bech to start in Brentford's final five Premier League matches of the season. He finished a mid-table 2021–22 season with 15 appearances.

==== 2022–2023 and loans to Nice and Groningen ====
Despite injuries to Ethan Pinnock, Kristoffer Ajer, Charlie Goode and with Zanka yet to sign a new contract, Bech began the 2022–23 season as third-choice centre back, behind Pontus Jansson and new signing Ben Mee. After just 17 minutes of Premier League football and one EFL Cup start (on which he scored) during the opening month of the regular season, Bech joined French Ligue 1 club Nice on loan until the end of the 2022–23 season. Aside from two friendly appearances during a December 2022 training camp, Bech failed to make a competitive appearance for the club and was recalled by Brentford on 1 January 2023.

Following two appearances back with Brentford, the one-year option on Bech's contract was taken up and on 18 January 2023 he joined Eredivisie club Groningen on loan until the end of the 2022–23 season. Though he featured as captain during a spell interrupted by a broken forearm, Bech's 11 appearances failed to prevent the club's relegation to the Eerste Divisie.

Despite a near-full involvement in the 2023–24 pre-season match programme, Bech was absent from Brentford's early regular-season squads and he departed the club on 1 September 2023. During six years with Brentford, he made 72 appearances and scored four goals.

=== FC Midtjylland ===
On 1 September 2023, Bech returned to Denmark to sign a four-year contract with Superliga club FC Midtjylland for an undisclosed fee. He made 27 appearances and scored a season-high four goals during the Superliga championship-winning 2023–24 season. In July 2024, Bech was named as club captain.

Bech made 49 appearances during the 2024–25 season, scoring one goal. He made a career-high 51 appearances during 2025–26 season, in which the club won the Danish Cup. In recognition of his performances, Bech was named in the Superliga Team of the Year.

== International career ==
Bech won his maiden call into the Denmark U18 squad in September 2016 and made 7 appearances during the 2016–17 season, captaining the team and scoring once in a 4–2 friendly victory over Belarus U18 on 18 October.

He was promoted into the U19 squad in January 2017 and made two appearances during the remainder of the 2016–17 season. In mid-August 2017, Bech was named as captain of the Denmark U19 squad for the 2017 Four Nations Tournament, in which he made two appearances.

Bech appeared in six of the 10 matches during the U21 team's successful 2021 European U21 Championship qualifying campaign and he was named in the squad for the Finals. He started each of Denmark's group matches and scored in a 2–0 win over Iceland U21 on 28 March 2021. Injury saw Bech replaced in the squad for the knockout stages, though his group stage performances were such that he was named in the Squad of the Tournament.

On 24 May 2022, Bech won his maiden call-up to the senior team when he was named in the initial 29-man squad for four 2022–23 Nations League A matches in June 2022. He was cut from the final 26-man selection.

== Personal life ==
Bech began his sporting career as a handball player, before switching to football. He is an Arsenal supporter.

== Career statistics ==
As of match played 19 October 2026

Appearances and goals by club, season and competition
Club	Season	League			National cup (Note: Includes Danish Cup, FA Cup, Coupe de France)		League cup (Note: Includes EFL Cup)		Europe		Other		Total	
Club	Season	Division	Apps	Goals	Apps	Goals	Apps	Goals	Apps	Goals	Apps	Goals	Apps	Goals
AC Horsens	2014–15	Danish 1st Division	6	0	0	0	—		—		—		6	0
AC Horsens	2015–16	Danish 1st Division	5	0	1	0	—		—		—		6	0
AC Horsens	2016–17	Danish Superliga	6	0	3	1	—		—		1 (Note: Appearance in Danish Superliga relegation play-offs)	0	10	1
AC Horsens	2017–18	Danish Superliga	3	1	—		—		—		—		3	1
AC Horsens	Total		20	1	4	1	—		—		1	0	25	2
Brentford	2017–18	Championship	0	0	0	0	0	0	—		—		0	0
Brentford	2018–19	Championship	8	0	1	0	1	0	—		—		10	0
Brentford	2019–20	Championship	1	0	1	0	0	0	—		—		2	0
Brentford	2020–21	Championship	32	2	2	1	5	0	—		0	0	39	3
Brentford	2021–22	Premier League	11	0	2	0	2	0	—		—		15	0
Brentford	2022–23	Premier League	4	0	1	0	1	1	—		—		6	1
Brentford	Total		56	2	7	1	9	1	—		0	0	72	4
AFC Wimbledon (loan)	2019–20	League One	9	0	—		—		—		—		9	0
Nice (loan)	2022–23	Ligue 1	0	0	0	0	—		0	0	—		0	0
Groningen (loan)	2022–23	Eredivisie	11	0	—		—		—		—		11	0
FC Midtjylland	2023–24	Danish Superliga	24	4	3	0	—		—		—		27	4
FC Midtjylland	2024–25	Danish Superliga	31	1	2	0	—		16 (Note: 10 appearances in Europa League, 6 appearances in Champions League)	0	—		49	1
FC Midtjylland	2025–26	Danish Superliga	29	2	6	0	—		16 (Note: Appearances in Europa League)	2	—		51	4
FC Midtjylland	2026–27	Danish Superliga	7	1	0	0	—		7 (Note: Two appearances in UEFA Europa League, four appearances in UEFA Conference League, one appearance in UEFA Conference League)	0	—		14	1
FC Midtjylland	Total		91	8	11	0	—		39	2	—		140	9
Career total			185	11	22	2	9	1	39	2	1	0	257	16

== Honours ==
Brentford

- EFL Championship play-offs: 2021

Midtjylland

- Danish Superliga: 2023–24
- Danish Cup: 2025–26

Individual

- UEFA European U21 Championship Squad of the Tournament: 2021
- Danish Superliga Team of the Year: 2025–26
