= Julius Emefile =

Danish footballer (born 2007

Personal information
- Date of birth: 2 April 2007 (age 19)
- Position: Winger

Team information
- Current team: FC Midtjylland
- Number: 38

Youth career
- –2024: FC Copenhagen
- 2024–2026: FC Midtjylland

Senior career*
Years	Team	Apps	(Gls)
2026–	FC Midtjylland	12	(2)

International career^{‡}
2025	Denmark U18	2	(0)
2025–	Denmark U19	7	(2)
2026–	Denmark U20	1	(1)
- * Club domestic league appearances and goals as of 19 October 2026 ‡ National team caps and goals as of 4 October 2026

Julius Emefile (born 2 April 2007) is a Danish professional footballer who plays as a winger for Danish Superliga club FC Midtjylland.

== Club career ==
Emefile began his career in the academy of FC Copenhagen before making the move across Denmark to the under-19s team of FC Midtjylland in June 2024. After 10 months at his new club, his contract was extended until 2030. He eventually made his senior debut on 22 February 2026, coming on as a substitute in a 4–0 win away from home against Silkeborg IF He made his Danish Superliga starting debut on 4 April 2026 against Sønderjyske, and in the following round he scored his first ever senior goal – the 93rd minute 2–1 winner against AGF.

== International career ==
Emefile is a youth international for Denmark.

== Career statistics ==
As of match played 19 October 2026

Appearances and goals by club, season and competition
Club	Season	League			National cup		Europe		Total	
Club	Season	Division	Apps	Goals	Apps	Goals	Apps	Goals	Apps	Goals
FC Midtjylland	2025–26	Danish Superliga	4	1	0	0	0	0	4	1
FC Midtjylland	2026–27	Danish Superliga	8	1	1	3	2 (Note: One appearance on UEFA Europa League, one appearance in UEFA Conference League)	0	11	4
Career total			12	2	1	3	2	0	15	5
