= Markus Walker =

Danish footballer (born 2006)

Personal information
- Full name: Markus Walker Andersen
- Date of birth: 23 November 2006 (age 19)
- Place of birth: Sydney, Australia
- Height: 1.77 m (5 ft 10 in)
- Position: Centre-back

Team information
- Current team: Nordsjælland
- Number: 28

Youth career
- 2011–2017: Dragør Boldklub
- 2017–2025: Nordsjælland

Senior career*
Years	Team	Apps	(Gls)
2025–	Nordsjælland	12	(2)

International career^{‡}
2024	Denmark U18	1	(0)
2024–2025	Denmark U19	13	(0)
2026–	Denmark U20	2	(0)
- * Club domestic league appearances and goals as of 21:04, 9 October 2026 (UTC) ‡ National team caps and goals as of 17:22, 4 October 2026 (UTC)

Markus Walker Andersen (born 23 November 2006) is a professional footballer who plays as a centre-back for Danish Superliga club Nordsjælland. Born in Australia, he represents Denmark at youth level.

== Club career ==
Walker joined FC Nordsjælland from Dragør Boldklub in 2017. Here he worked his way up through the club's youth system.

In June 2024, 17-year-old Walker trained with the first-team squad in pre-season and also attended a training camp in Netherlands. The following month, Walker signed a new deal with the club.

Walker was also part of the first team training camp in winter 2025. On 23 February 2025 Walker made his official debut when he replaced Juho Lähteenmäki in the 81st minute in a Danish Superliga match against Sønderjyske.

On 24 July 2025, just days after Walker made his starting debut for Nordsjælland in the first match of the 2025–26 Danish Superliga season, it was confirmed that he had signed a new deal until June 2030. He was also promoted to the first team immediately.

== Personal life ==
Walker was born in Australia and moved to Denmark when he was almost a year old. He has a Danish mother and an English father.

== Career statistics ==
As of match played 9 October 2026

Appearances and goals by club, season and competition
Club	Season	League			Cup		Europe		Other		Total	
Club	Season	Division	Apps	Goals	Apps	Goals	Apps	Goals	Apps	Goals	Apps	Goals
Nordsjælland	2024–25	Danish Superliga	2	0	—		—		—		2	0
Nordsjælland	2025–26	Danish Superliga	7	0	2	0	—		—		9	0
Nordsjælland	2026–27	Danish Superliga	3	2	1	0	2 (Note: Appearances in UEFA Conference League)	1	—		6	3
Career total			12	2	3	0	2	1	0	0	17	3
