= Justin Janssen =

Danish footballer (born 2006)

Personal information
- Full name: Justin Meltofte Janssen
- Date of birth: 25 July 2006 (age 20)
- Place of birth: Farum, Denmark
- Position: Midfielder

Team information
- Current team: Nordsjælland
- Number: 18

Youth career
- 2012–2014: AB
- 2014–2024: Nordsjælland

Senior career*
Years	Team	Apps	(Gls)
2024–	Nordsjælland	52	(5)

International career^{‡}
2024	Denmark U-18	4	(0)
2024–2025	Denmark U-19	13	(0)
- * Club domestic league appearances and goals as of 18 October 2026 ‡ National team caps and goals as of 21:03, 19 June 2025 (UTC)

Justin Meltofte Janssen (born 25 July 2006) is a Danish footballer who plays as a midfielder for Danish Superliga club FC Nordsjælland.

== Club career ==
=== Nordsjælland ===
Janssen is a product of FC Nordsjælland and played his way up through the club's youth ranks; a club he joined at the age of 8.

In the summer of 2024, Janssen attended a training camp with the Nordsjælland first team squad. From here, Janssen started training more with the first team. In the third round of the 2024-25 Danish Superliga, a match against Vejle Boldklub on 5 August 2024, Janssen was selected for the first time and sat on the bench for the entire match. The following day, on 6 August 2024, Janssen extended his contract with Nordsjælland until June 2028.

On 18 August 2024, Janssen made his debut in the starting lineup against Silkeborg IF in the Danish Superliga. On 1 November 2024, Nordsjælland confirmed that Janssen had been permanently promoted to the first team squad.

On 26 July 2025, it was confirmed that Janssen had signed a new contract with Nordsjælland until 2029.

== Career statistics ==
As of match played 18 October 2026

Appearances and goals by club, season and competition
Club	Season	League			Cup		Europe		Other		Total	
Club	Season	Division	Apps	Goals	Apps	Goals	Apps	Goals	Apps	Goals	Apps	Goals
Nordsjælland	2024–25	Danish Superliga	12	0	1	0	—		—		13	0
Nordsjælland	2025–26	Danish Superliga	29	3	4	1	—		—		33	4
Nordsjælland	2026–27	Danish Superliga	11	2	0	0	7 (Note: Appearances in UEFA Conference League)	0	—		18	2
Career total			52	5	5	1	7	0	0	0	64	6
