= Friday Etim =

Nigerian footballer (born 2002)

Personal information
- Full name: Friday Ubi Etim
- Date of birth: 21 May 2002 (age 24)
- Place of birth: Lagos, Nigeria
- Height: 1.86 m (6 ft 1 in)
- Position: Striker

Team information
- Current team: Midtjylland
- Number: 90

Youth career
- DN10 Football Academy
- 2021: Dominion Hotspurs
- 2021–2022: Vizela

Senior career*
Years	Team	Apps	(Gls)
2022–2023	Vizela	21	(2)
2023–2025	Mafra	33	(7)
2025–2026	Midtjylland	1	(0)
2026	Fredericia	14	(5)
2026–	Midtjylland	11	(5)
- * Club domestic league appearances and goals as of 19 October 2026

Friday Ubi Etim (born 21 May 2002) is a Nigerian professional footballer who plays as a striker for Danish Superliga club Midtjylland.

== Club career ==
A youth product of Dominion Hotspurs and DN10 Football Academy. Etim moved to Vizela U23s on 2 September 2021, signing until 2025. With the Vizela U23s he was named the top scorer for the 2021–22 Liga Revelação season. He made his professional debut with Vizela in a 3–1 Taça de Portugal loss to Porto on 12 January 2022. He was promoted to their Primeira Liga squad ahead of the 2022–23 season.

On 30 June 2023, Etim signed for Liga Portugal 2 club Mafra, for a transfer fee reported to be over €1 million.

On 20 June 2025, Danish club FC Midtjylland announced the signing of Etim, on a contract until summer 2029. Just six months later, on 22 January 2026, Etim moved to fellow league club, Danish Superliga club FC Fredericia, on a deal until June 2029. He enjoyed a goalscoring debut for the club on February 9th, when they won 3-2 against Vejle BK.

== Career statistics ==
As of match played 19 October 2026

Appearances and goals by club, season and competition
Club	Season	League			Cup		League cup		Europe		Total	
Club	Season	Division	Apps	Goals	Apps	Goals	Apps	Goals	Apps	Goals	Apps	Goals
Vizela	2021–22	Primeira Liga	2	0	1	0	0	0	—		3	0
Vizela	2022–23	Primeira Liga	19	2	1	0	2	1	—		22	3
Vizela	Total		21	2	2	0	2	1	—		25	3
Mafra	2023–24	Liga Portugal 2	3	0	0	0	1	0	—		4	0
Mafra	2024–25	Liga Portugal 2	30	7	1	1	0	0	—		31	8
Mafra	Total		33	7	1	1	1	0	—		35	8
Midtjylland	2025–26	Danish Superliga	1	0	0	0	—		3 (Note: Appearances in UEFA Europa League)	0	4	0
Fredericia	2025–26	Danish Superliga	14	5	—		—		—		14	5
Midtjylland	2026–27	Danish Superliga	11	5	1	1	—		5 (Note: One appearance in UEFA Europa League, four appearances in UEFA Conference League)	0	17	6
Career total			81	19	4	2	3	0	8	1	96	22
