= Emilio Simonsen =

Danish footballer (born 1999)

Personal information
- Full name: Emilio Stuberg Simonsen
- Date of birth: 31 October 1999 (age 27)
- Place of birth: Denmark
- Position: Midfielder

Team information
- Current team: Fredericia
- Number: 10

Youth career
- 2012–2017: Lyngby

Senior career*
Years	Team	Apps	(Gls)
2017–2021	Lyngby	31	(1)
2020	→ Nykøbing (loan)	14	(2)
2021–2022	HB Køge	30	(2)
2022–2023	Nykøbing	24	(7)
2023–	Fredericia	56	(10)
- * Club domestic league appearances and goals as of 19 May 2026

Emilio Simonsen (born 31 October 1999) is a Danish professional footballer who plays as a midfielder for Danish Superliga club FC Fredericia.

== Club career ==
=== Lyngby ===
Simonsen arrived in the Lyngby Boldklub youth academy as a 12-year-old in 2012. He extended his contract with the club on 24 March 2018, keeping him a part of De Kongeblå until 2021. As part of the contract extension, he was promoted to the first team. At the age of 17, Simonsen made his first team debut for Lyngby in the Danish Superliga on 3 March against Hobro IK. He made 10 league appearances during the 2017–18 season.

==== Loan to Nykøbing ====
On 21 January 2020, Simonsen joined Danish second tier club Nykøbing FC on a year-long loan.

=== HB Køge ===
On 26 January 2021 it was confirmed, that Simonsen had signed a three-year deal with Danish 1st Division club HB Køge.

== International career ==
In August 2016, Simonsen received a call-up for the Denmark under-18 team without making an appearance.
