= Bertil Grønkjær =

Danish footballer

Personal information
- Full name: Bertil Magne Grønkjær Pedersen
- Date of birth: 24 July 2007 (age 19)
- Place of birth: Aalborg, Denmark
- Height: 1.95 m (6 ft 5 in)
- Position: Goalkeeper

Team information
- Current team: AaB
- Number: 40

Youth career
- Aalborg Chang
- AaB

Senior career*
Years	Team	Apps	(Gls)
2025–	AaB	10	(0)

International career
2022–2023	Denmark U-16	5	(0)
2023–2024	Denmark U-17	7	(0)
2024–2025	Denmark U-18	3	(0)
2025–	Denmark U-19	1	(0)
- * Club domestic league appearances and goals as of 2 June 2026

Bertil Magne Grønkjær Pedersen (born 24 July 2007) is a Danish footballer who plays as a goalkeeper for Danish 1st Division club AaB.

== Club career ==
=== AaB ===
Grønkjær is a product of Aalborg Chang, before joining AaB as a U13 player. He worked his way up through the club's academy, and during his youth, he was also selected for various Danish youth national teams several times.

In December 2023, Grønkjær extended his contract with AaB until the end of 2026. A year later, in December 2024, there were several clubs reportedly interested in Grønkjær, with suitors from both foreign and domestic clubs.

On May 23, 2025, Grønkjær signed a new contract with the club until the end of 2027. The following day, Grønkjær made his official debut, starting in a Danish Superliga match against Lyngby Boldklub; a match AaB lost 1–3.

Ahead of the 2025–26 season, 17-year old Grønkjær was permanently promoted to the first team squad.
