= Adam Herdonsson =

Swedish footballer (born 2004)

Personal information
- Full name: Adam Herman Bengt Herdonsson
- Date of birth: 7 April 2004 (age 22)
- Place of birth: Ljungby, Sweden
- Height: 1.81 m (5 ft 11 in)
- Position: Midfielder

Team information
- Current team: AC Horsens
- Number: 17

Youth career
- –2019: Ljungby IF
- 2019–2020: IFK Värnamo
- 2020–2022: Östers IF

Senior career*
Years	Team	Apps	(Gls)
2022–2024	Östers IF	45	(1)
2024–	Horsens	51	(2)

International career^{‡}
2023–2024	Sweden U19	3	(0)
2026	Sweden U21	2	(0)
- * Club domestic league appearances and goals as of 13:17, 27 July 2026 (UTC) ‡ National team caps and goals as of 17:14, 6 October 2026 (UTC)

Adam Herdonsson (born 7 April 2004) is a Swedish professional footballer who plays as a midfielder for Danish Superliga club AC Horsens. He previously played for Östers IF and has represented Sweden at under-20 level.

== Club career ==
Herdonsson began his career with his hometown club Ljungby IF. At age 14 he joined the youth setup of IFK Värnamo, before later moving to Växjö for upper secondary school and signing with the academy of Östers IF. In the summer of 2022 he signed his first senior contract and was promoted to the first team.

In February 2023 he extended his contract through the 2025 season.

During the 2023 season he was named Sports Surprise of the Year in Kronoberg by Sveriges Radio.

On 2 July 2024 he transferred to Danish club AC Horsens. The transfer fee was reported by Smålandsposten to be around 6 million SEK, making it one of the largest sales in Östers IF's history. He signed a contract running until 30 June 2028.

During the 2025–26 season Herdonsson played an important role in AC Horsens' promotion to the Danish Superliga. In the decisive match against Kolding IF on 1 June 2026, he provided the assist for Kristian Kirkegaard's 1–0 goal, the only goal of the match.

== International career ==
Herdonsson represented Sweden at U20 level, earning three caps between 2023 and 2024.

== Honours ==
- Sports Surprise of the Year in Kronoberg: 2023 (Sveriges Radio)
