= Mike Tullberg =

Danish footballer and manager (born 1985)

Personal information
- Date of birth: 25 December 1985 (age 40)
- Place of birth: Farum, Denmark
- Height: 1.87 m (6 ft 2 in)
- Position: Forward

Team information
- Current team: FC Midtjylland (manager)

Youth career
- AB
- Farum BK

Senior career*
Years	Team	Apps	(Gls)
–2003	Randers Freja		
2003–2006	Grenaa IF	28	(5)
2006–2007	AGF	28	(4)
2007–2009	Reggina	5	(0)
2008–2009	→ Heart of Midlothian (loan)	7	(0)
2009–2011	Rot-Weiß Oberhausen	4	(0)

Managerial career
- 2014–2017: Rot-Weiß Oberhausen U19
- 2017–2018: AGF U19
- 2019–2020: Borussia Dortmund II
- 2020–2025: Borussia Dortmund U19
- 2025: Borussia Dortmund (caretaker)
- 2025: Borussia Dortmund II
- 2025–: FC Midtjylland
- * Club domestic league appearances and goals

Mike Tullberg (born 25 December 1985) is a Danish professional football manager and former player who is currently in charge of FC Midtjylland.

== Playing career ==
A forward, Tullberg got his national breakthrough with Danish Superliga club AGF when he scored a goal against Danish giants Brøndby IF which was named Danish goal of the year 2007. Tullberg signed for Reggina together with fellow Dane Kris Stadsgaard in 2007. He struggled to gain a regular place in the Reggina team, and Tullberg joined Hearts on a one-year loan deal. In August 2009, he joined Rot-Weiß Oberhausen in the German 2nd Bundesliga. Due to injuries, over the course of two years he was limited to making just four appearances. For this reason his contract was not renewed. A year later, he retired from football.

== Coaching career ==
A short time later Tullberg took over the post of assistant coach at the German district League club SG Schönebeck. A year later he went as a youth coach to his former club Rot-Weiß Oberhausen and a half years later he took over the post of coach at the U-19 of the clubs from Oberhausen.

On 24 March 2017, it was confirmed Tullberg would be the new manager of AGF Aarhus U19 starting from the summer 2017.

On 25 March 2019, Borussia Dortmund announced that Tullberg had signed with the club and would start his new job as manager of the club's reserve team from the 2019–20 season. In May 2020, the club announced that Tullberg would become manager of the U19 team for the following season; seen as a more prestigious position within the ranks of the club.

On 22 January 2025, Tullberg was named interim head coach of Borussia Dortmund's first team, competing in the Bundesliga, the top tier of the German football league system. He coached the first team in three matches at home, a 2–2 draw against Werder Bremen, a 3–1 victory over Shakhtar Donetsk in the Champions League, and a 2–1 away victory over Heidenheim.

On 5 May 2025, Tullberg once again became manager of Borussia Dortmund II in the 3. Liga following the sacking of Jan Zimmermann.

On 2 September 2025, Tullberg left Dortmund to become new manager of Danish Superliga club FC Midtjylland, replacing Thomas Thomasberg. In his first season, Midtjylland came second to Aarhus GF, and he won the Danish Cup. Tullberg was however suspended for the final against FC København, following a yellow card in the 31st league match against FC Nordsjælland. He said afterwards, that he was not aware that suspensions in the league could be carried over to the Cup tournament. During the season he was suspended due to accumulation of yellow cards on 3 separate occasions.

== Managerial statistics ==
As of match played 8 November 2026

Team	From	To	Record					Ref.
Team	From	To	P	W	D	L	Win %	Ref.
Borussia Dortmund II	1 July 2019	30 June 2020	25	9	7	9	36.00	
Borussia Dortmund	22 January 2025	1 February 2025	3	2	1	0	66.67	
Borussia Dortmund II	5 May 2025	2 September 2025	8	2	2	4	25.00	
FC Midtjylland	2 September 2025	Present	67	39	17	11	58.21	
Total			103	52	27	24	50.5	—

== Honours ==
=== Manager ===
Midtjylland

- Danish Cup: 2025–26
