= 2026–27 Danish Superliga =

37th season of Danish Superliga

Superliga
- Season: 2026–27
- Dates: 24 July 2026 – 30 May 2027
- Matches: 84
- Goals: 253 (3.01 per match)
- Top goalscorer: Mohamed Elyounoussi; Oliver Ross; (7 goals)
- Best goalkeeper: Diant Ramaj; (6 clean sheets)
- Biggest home win: Viborg 4–0 Copenhagen; (23 August 2026); Sønderjyske 4–0 Silkeborg; (18 October 2026); Horsens 5–1 Sønderjyske; (25 October 2026)
- Biggest away win: OB 0–5 Copenhagen; (16 August 2026); Randers 1–6 Nordsjælland
- Highest scoring: Sønderjyske 2–5 Horsens; (6 September 2026); Brøndby 5–2 Lyngby; (11 October 2026)
- Longest winning run: 5 matches; Copenhagen
- Longest unbeaten run: 14 matches; Midtjylland
- Longest winless run: 9 matches; AGF
- Longest losing run: 4 matches; Brøndby; Sønderjyske
- Highest attendance: 28,359; Copenhagen 1–0 AGF; (18 October 2026)
- Lowest attendance: 3,413; Nordsjælland 1–0 Randers; (2 August 2026)
- Total attendance: 196,239
- Average attendance: 10,902
- All statistics correct as of 8 November 2026.

The 2026–27 Danish Superliga (officially the 3F Superliga for sponsorship purposes) is the 37th season of the Danish Superliga. The season began on 24 July 2026 and is set to end on 30 May 2027, after the conclusion of the matches of both the championship and relegation round. AGF entered the season as the defending champions after securing the first title in 40 years in the previous season.

The schedule for the first seven matchdays was released on 3 June 2026, with a match between Viborg and OB scheduled as the opening fixture.

The third match day, during the weekend of 8–9 August, was postponed for four teams who were competing in European competitions. The four clubs involved in the decision—AGF, Copenhagen, Midtjylland, and Nordsjælland—agreed unanimously to the change to maximise their chances of success in Europe and reduce player fatigue. The postponed games were moved to early September.

== Teams ==
Lyngby made an immediate return to the Superliga after winning the 2025–26 Danish 1st Division. They were joined by AC Horsens who secured second place. Fredericia and Vejle were both relegated after spending one and three seasons respectively in the Superliga.

=== Stadiums and locations ===
Locations of the Danish Superliga 2026–27 teams

Club	Location	Stadium	Turf	Capacity	2025–26 position
AGF	Aarhus	Ceres Park Vejlby	Hybrid	12,000	1st
Brøndby	Brøndby	Brøndby Stadium	Hybrid	28,000	4th
Copenhagen	Copenhagen	Parken	Hybrid	38,009	7th
Horsens	Horsens	CASA Arena Horsens	Grass	10,400	1D, 2nd
Lyngby	Kongens Lyngby	Lyngby Stadium	Natural	10,100	1D, 1st
Midtjylland	Herning	MCH Arena	Natural	11,809	2nd
Nordsjælland	Farum	Right to Dream Park	Artificial	9,900	3rd
OB	Odense	Nature Energy Park	Natural	15,633	8th
Randers	Randers	Cepheus Park Randers	Natural	11,801	10th
Silkeborg	Silkeborg	JYSK Park	Artificial	10,000	9th
Sønderjyske	Haderslev	Sydbank Park	Natural	10,100	6th
Viborg	Viborg	Energi Viborg Arena	Hybrid	10,000	5th

=== Personnel and sponsoring ===
Note: Flags indicate national team as has been defined under FIFA eligibility rules. Players and Managers may hold more than one non-FIFA nationality. Sponsors are as of the 2024/25 season and will be updated when new kits are revealed.

Team	Head coach	Captain	Kit manufacturer	Shirt sponsor (front)	Shirt sponsor (back)	Shirt sponsor (sleeve)	Shorts sponsor
AGF	(Denmark) Jakob Poulsen	(Denmark) Patrick Mortensen	Craft	H: Ceres, Arbejdernes Landsbank; A/T: Bravida	A/T: Arbejdernes Landsbank	Mybanker	H: Bravida; A/T: Faxe Kondi
Brøndby	(Denmark) Thomas Nørgaard	(Denmark) Daniel Wass	Hummel	Betano	NTG Nordic Transport	Opendo	None
Copenhagen	(Denmark) Bo Svensson	(Sweden) Viktor Claesson	Adidas	Unibet	Carlsberg	Carlsberg	Unibet
Horsens	(Denmark) Niki Zimling	(Croatia) Matej Delač	Hummel	ComeOn	P. Olesen and Sons A/S	Hybel Danmark A/S	VELUX
Lyngby	(Denmark) Andreas Bjelland (Denmark) Mikkel Jespersen	(Denmark) Mathias Hebo	Select	Magasin du Nord; Sparekassen	Carl Ras	V8 Construction	Johannes Fog
Midtjylland	(Denmark) Mike Tullberg	(Denmark) Mads Bech Sørensen	Puma	H: Vestjysk Bank; A/T: Arbejdernes Landsbank; All: Jack & Jones	Ejner Hessel	AL Finans	Arbejdernes Landsbank
Nordsjælland	(Denmark) Jens Fønsskov Olsen	(Denmark) Mark Brink	Nike	DHL	Arbejdernes Landsbank	Arbejdernes Landsbank	Faxe Kondi
OB	(Denmark) Thomas Thomasberg	(Denmark) Rasmus Falk	Hummel	Albani Brewery	Scan Global Logistics	None	None
Randers	(Denmark) Rasmus Bertelsen	(Netherlands) Wessel Dammers	Puma	Verdo, Sparekassen Kronjylland	Jysk Vin (H)/Gardin Lis (A)	ACTEC Batterier	Klodskassen
Silkeborg	(Denmark) Morten Dahm Kjærgaard	(Norway) Robin Østrøm	Adidas	Jysk, Lars Larsen Group	Various	SPORT 24 A/S	None
Sønderjyske	vacant	(Denmark) Rasmus Vinderslev	Hummel	Sydjysk Sparekasse, Davidsen	Kræftens Bekæmpelse	SPORT 24 A/S	Dansk Fliserens
Viborg	(Denmark) Nickolai Lund	(Denmark) Jeppe Grønning	Capelli Sport	H: Skanlux Byggefirma; A: VillaVilla	Vexa Ejendomskreditselskab	VillaVilla	Vexa Ejendomskreditselskab

=== Managerial changes ===
Team	Outgoing manager	Manner of departure	Date of vacancy	Position in table	Replaced by	Date of appointment
Brøndby	(Wales) Steve Cooper	Sacked	22 May 2026	Pre-season	(Denmark) Thomas Nørgaard	10 June 2026
Sønderjyske	(Denmark) Thomas Nørgaard	Signed by Brøndby	10 June 2026	Pre-season	(Denmark) Fatah Abdirahman	19 June 2026
Silkeborg	(Denmark) Kent Nielsen	Signed by Denmark (assistant)	11 June 2026	Pre-season	(Denmark) Morten Dahm Kjærgaard	11 June 2026
OB	(Germany) Alexander Zorniger	Sacked	30 July 2026	12th	(Denmark) Thomas Thomasberg	30 July 2026
Sønderjyske	(Denmark) Fatah Abdirahman	Sacked	6 November 2026	12th		

== Regular season ==
=== League table ===
Pos	Team	Pld	W	D	L	GF	GA	GD	Pts	Qualification
1	Copenhagen	15	10	2	3	29	17	+12	32	Qualification for the Championship round
2	Midtjylland	14	9	5	0	29	17	+12	32	Qualification for the Championship round
3	Viborg	15	8	3	4	22	13	+9	27	Qualification for the Championship round
4	Nordsjælland	15	7	5	3	31	18	+13	26	Qualification for the Championship round
5	Brøndby	14	7	1	6	23	21	+2	22	Qualification for the Championship round
6	OB	15	5	5	5	18	20	−2	20	Qualification for the Championship round
7	Horsens	15	5	4	6	26	24	+2	19	Qualification for the Relegation round
8	AGF	15	4	6	5	21	22	−1	18	Qualification for the Relegation round
9	Silkeborg	15	3	6	6	19	27	−8	15	Qualification for the Relegation round
10	Randers	15	3	3	9	14	27	−13	12	Qualification for the Relegation round
11	Lyngby	15	2	5	8	20	31	−11	11	Qualification for the Relegation round
12	Sønderjyske	15	2	3	10	20	35	−15	9	Qualification for the Relegation round

Updated to match(es) played on 22 November 2026. Source: Danish Football Association (in Danish), Soccerway
Rules for classification: 1) Points; 2) Goal difference; 3) Goals scored; 4) Away goals scored; 5) Play-off (played on neutral ground if determining teams for different rounds); 6) Draw.

=== Results ===
Home \ Away	AGF	BRO	COP	ACH	LYN	MID	NOR	ODE	RAN	SIL	SON	VIB
AGF		1–1		2–0	2–1	0–2		2–2		2–2	3–0	2–1
Brøndby	2–0		0–1		5–2				0–3	3–1	3–2	1–0
Copenhagen	1–1	1–0		2–0	3–2		2–0	1–1			3–1	
Horsens	2–2	0–2			2–1		1–1		0–0	3–1	5–1	2–3
Lyngby	2–2					1–1	3–3	1–1	2–1	0–4	1–1	
Midtjylland		4–1	2–1	2–1	3–2		2–2		1–0		2–2	
Nordsjælland	2–0	3–1	5–0			2–3		0–0	1–0	1–0		
OB		2–1	0–5	1–2		1–1				4–1	1–0	1–2
Randers	2–1	1–3	0–4		2–0		1–6	1–2		1–1		0–2
Silkeborg			1–3	3–3	1–0	1–1	1–1	1–0				1–1
Sønderjyske			0–2	2–5		2–3	0–3	1–2	4–2	4–0		
Viborg	2–1		4–0	1–0	0–2	1–2	4–1	1–0	0–0			

Updated to match(es) played on 22 November 2026. Source: Soccerway
Legend: Blue = home team win; Yellow = draw; Red = away team win.

== Championship round ==
=== League table ===
Points and goals carried over in full from the regular season.

Pos	Team	Pld	W	D	L	GF	GA	GD	Pts	
1	1st	0	0	0	0	0	0	0	0	Qualification for the Champions League play-off round
2	2nd	0	0	0	0	0	0	0	0	Qualification for the Champions League second qualifying round
3	3rd	0	0	0	0	0	0	0	0	Qualification for the Conference League second qualifying round
4	4th	0	0	0	0	0	0	0	0	Qualification for the European play-off match
5	5th	0	0	0	0	0	0	0	0	
6	6th	0	0	0	0	0	0	0	0	

Updated to match(es) played on 7 July 2026. Source: Danish Football Association (in Danish), Soccerway
Rules for classification: 1) Points; 2) Goal difference; 3) Goals scored; 4) Away goals scored; 5) Play-off (played on neutral ground if determining teams for different rounds); 6) Draw.

=== Results ===
Home \ Away	1st	2nd	3rd	4th	5th	6th
1st						
2nd						
3rd						
4th						
5th						
6th						

Updated to match(es) played on 7 July 2026. Source: Soccerway
Legend: Blue = home team win; Yellow = draw; Red = away team win.

== Relegation round ==
=== League table ===
Points and goals carried over in full from the regular season.

Pos	Team	Pld	W	D	L	GF	GA	GD	Pts	
1	7th	0	0	0	0	0	0	0	0	Qualification for the European play-off match
2	8th	0	0	0	0	0	0	0	0	
3	9th	0	0	0	0	0	0	0	0	
4	10th	0	0	0	0	0	0	0	0	
5	11th	0	0	0	0	0	0	0	0	Relegation to 1st Division
6	12th	0	0	0	0	0	0	0	0	Relegation to 1st Division

Updated to match(es) played on 7 July 2026. Source: Danish Football Association (in Danish), Soccerway
Rules for classification: 1) Points; 2) Goal difference; 3) Goals scored; 4) Away goals scored; 5) Play-off (played on neutral ground if determining teams for different rounds); 6) Draw.

=== Results ===
Home \ Away	7th	8th	9th	10th	11th	12th
7th						
8th						
9th						
10th						
11th						
12th						

Updated to match(es) played on 7 July 2026. Source: Soccerway
Legend: Blue = home team win; Yellow = draw; Red = away team win.

== European play-offs ==
The 4th-placed team of the championship round advanced to a play-off match against the winning team of the qualification round (no. 7) in a single-leg tie, with the team from the championship round as hosts. The winner earned a place in the Conference League second qualifying round.

=== European play-off match ===
v

== Season statistics ==
As of 8 November 2026

=== Top scorers ===
Rank	Player	Club	Goals
1	(Norway) Mohamed Elyounoussi	Copenhagen	7
1	(Denmark) Oliver Ross	Silkeborg	7
3	(Nigeria) Friday Etim	Midtjylland	6
3	(Equatorial Guinea) Dorian Jr.	Viborg	6
3	(Denmark) Alexander Lind	Nordsjælland	6
6	(Canada) Simon Colyn	Lyngby	5
6	(Denmark) Mads Frøkjær-Jensen	Brøndby	5
6	(Guinea) Mohamed Cherif Haidara	Sønderjyske	5
6	(Norway) Birger Meling	Copenhagen	5
6	(Germany) Janni Serra	AGF	5
6	(Denmark) Mike Themsen	Randers	5

==== Hat-tricks ====
Player	For	Against	Result	Date
(Norway) Mohamed Elyounoussi	Copenhagen	Silkeborg	3–1 (A)	2 August 2026
(Denmark) Oliver Ross	Silkeborg	Horsens	3–3 (H)	11 October 2026

=== Clean sheets ===
Rank	Player	Club	Clean sheets
1	(Germany) Diant Ramaj	Copenhagen	6
2	(Denmark) Andreas Hansen	Nordsjælland	5
2	(Denmark) Kasper Kiilerich	Viborg	5
4	(Denmark) Aske Andrésen	Silkeborg	3
4	(Austria) Patrick Pentz	Brøndby	3
6	(Denmark) Jesper Hansen	AGF	2
6	(Australia) Paul Izzo	Randers	2
6	(Iceland) Elías Rafn Ólafsson	Midtjylland	2
6	(Norway) Viljar Myhra	OB	2

=== Discipline ===
==== Player ====
- Most yellow cards: 6
  - (Sweden) Adam Herdonsson (Horsens)
- Most red cards: 1
  - Ten players

==== Club ====
- Most yellow cards: 32
  - Horsens
- Fewest yellow cards: 18
  - Viborg
- Most red cards: 3
  - Randers
- Fewest red cards: 0
  - Six clubs

== Monthly awards ==
Month	Player of the Month		Young Player of the Month		Goal of the Month	
Month	Player	Club	Player	Club	Player	Club
August	(Norway) Mohamed Elyounoussi	Copenhagen	(Denmark) Justin Janssen	Nordsjælland	(Guinea-Bissau) Franculino Djú	Midtjylland
September	(Nigeria) Friday Etim	Midtjylland	(Denmark) Justin Janssen	Nordsjælland	(Guyana) Osaze De Rosario	Sønderjyske
October	(Denmark) Philip Billing	Midtjylland	(Denmark) Frederik Emmery	AGF	(Denmark) Frederik Emmery	AGF
