= Mohamed Cherif Haidara =

Guinean footballer (born 2005)

Personal information
- Full name: Sidi Mohamed Cherif Haidara
- Date of birth: 2 October 2005 (age 21)
- Place of birth: Conakry, Guinea
- Height: 1.90 m (6 ft 3 in)
- Positions: Defensive midfielder; attacking midfielder

Team information
- Current team: Sønderjyske
- Number: 31

Youth career
- Academie Sportive M.L.K
- –2023: Ankaragücü

Senior career*
Years	Team	Apps	(Gls)
2024	Ishøj	16	(2)
2024–	Sønderjyske	44	(5)

International career^{‡}
2026–	Guinea	1	(0)
- * Club domestic league appearances and goals ‡ National team caps and goals as of 19:00, 4 June 2026 (UTC)

Sidi Mohamed Cherif Haidara (born 2 October 2005) is a Guinean professional footballer who plays as a midfielder for Danish Superliga club Sønderjyske and the Guinea national team.

== Career ==
Haidara was born on 2 October 2005 in Guinea and started his football journey at Académie Sportive Marie Louise Mandet in Guinea. After a training camp with Danish 3rd Division club Ishøj IF in February 2023, the club confirmed in January 2024, a year later, that they had signed Haidara from Turkish MKE Ankaragücü, where he had played for the club's U-19 team.

Haidara had a very good season in Ishøj, which also ended with the club being promoted to the 2024–25 Danish 2nd Division. After the season, there was great interest from many clubs in Haidara, who also ended up trying out for both FC Midtjylland and Sønderjyske.

On 4 July 2024, newly promoted Danish Superliga club Sønderjyske confirmed that Haidara joined the club on a deal until June 2028. On 26 July 2024 Haidara made his debut in the Danish Superliga when he came on with just under 20 minutes left in a match against Lyngby Boldklub. He scored his first league goal for Sønderjyske in the last game of the season in a 2–3 away win against Vejle Boldklub.

On 14 August 2025, Cherif signed a new contract with Sønderjyske until June 2029.

Already a year later, Cherif signed a new contract with Sønderjyske until June 2031, where is also changed his number from 31 to 8.

== International career ==
Haidara was called up to the senior Guinea national team for friendlies in June 2026.
