= Denmark national under-19 football team =

National association football team

Denmark Under-19
- Association: Danish Football Association (Dansk Boldspil-Union)
- Confederation: UEFA
- Head coach: Mads Lyng
- Most caps: Henrik Jensen (25)
- Top scorer: David Nielsen (14)
- FIFA code: DEN
First colours	Second colours

First international
- Norway 1–1 Denmark (Oslo, Norway; 5 July 1950)

Biggest win
- Denmark 10–0 Poland (Nakskov, Denmark; 9 November 1994)

Biggest defeat
- Denmark 0–8 West Germany (Givat Haim, Israel; 29 December 1977)

UEFA U-19 Championship
- Appearances: 3 (first in 2024)
- Best result: Group stage

The Denmark national under-19 football team is a team under the Danish Football Association, selected among all Danish football players under the age of 19, to represent Denmark in international U / 19 football tournaments organized by FIFA and UEFA. The team was founded in 1950 as an under-18 team. In 2001, it was changed to an under-19 team.

== Players ==
=== Current squad ===
The following players were called up for the 2026 UEFA European Under-19 Championship preliminary squad.

No.	Pos.	Player	Date of birth (age)	Club
	GK	Bertil Grønkjær	24 July 2007 (age 19)	(Danish Football Association) AaB
	GK	Marcus Eskildsen	3 December 2007 (age 18)	(Danish Football Association) OB
	GK	Tobias Breum-Harild	25 October 2007 (age 19)	(Danish Football Association) Copenhagen
	GK	Thorbjørn Pløger	5 November 2008 (age 18)	(Danish Football Association) Vejle
	GK	Otto Lyhne	20 November 2008 (age 17)	(Danish Football Association) AGF
	DF	Philip Søndergaard	28 February 2007 (age 19)	(Royal Dutch Football Association) Emmen
	DF	Villads Rutkjær	4 October 2008 (age 18)	(Danish Football Association) Nordsjælland
	DF	William Møller	9 January 2008 (age 18)	(Danish Football Association) Silkeborg
	DF	Gustav Schjøtt	20 February 2007 (age 19)	(German Football Association) Bochum
	DF	Oliver Vest	13 April 2007 (age 19)	(Danish Football Association) Nordsjælland
	DF	Adam Amrani	9 October 2008 (age 18)	(Danish Football Association) OB
	DF	Gustav Ruby-Johansen	13 October 2008 (age 18)	(Danish Football Association) Brøndby
	DF	Frej Elkjær	5 May 2007 (age 19)	(Royal Dutch Football Association) AZ
	DF	Emil Monrad	5 April 2008 (age 18)	(Danish Football Association) Viborg
	DF	Victor Gustafsen	14 November 2007 (age 19)	(Danish Football Association) Nordsjælland
	DF	Simon Stüker	23 April 2007 (age 19)	(Danish Football Association) Silkeborg
	DF	Johan Hvistendahl	3 February 2008 (age 18)	(Danish Football Association) AaB
	MF	Malte Heyde	18 February 2007 (age 19)	(Danish Football Association) Nordsjælland
	MF	Marcus Bonde	11 February 2007 (age 19)	(Danish Football Association) AaB
	MF	Mikkel Øxenberg	25 January 2007 (age 19)	(Danish Football Association) Silkeborg
	MF	Christian Jørgensen	26 July 2008 (age 18)	(Danish Football Association) AC Horsens
	MF	Sofus Johannesen	4 May 2007 (age 19)	(Danish Football Association) FC Fredericia
	MF	Viktor Bender	12 July 2007 (age 19)	(Norwegian Football Federation) Molde
	MF	Valdemar Møller	20 May 2007 (age 19)	(Danish Football Association) AaB
	MF	Oliver Højer	24 January 2007 (age 19)	(Danish Football Association) Copenhagen
	MF	Max Jensen	27 March 2008 (age 18)	(Danish Football Association) Vejle
	MF	Sean Fetterlein	8 February 2008 (age 18)	(Danish Football Association) Copenhagen
	MF	Frederik Bunten	22 June 2008 (age 18)	(Danish Football Association) Midtjylland
	MF	Philip Keller	22 January 2008 (age 18)	(Danish Football Association) Viborg
	MF	William Martin	23 April 2007 (age 19)	(Danish Football Association) OB
	MF	Viggo Poulsen	7 April 2008 (age 18)	(Danish Football Association) Brøndby
	MF	Luca Dahl Tomasson	19 June 2008 (age 18)	(Royal Dutch Football Association) Feyenoord
	FW	Olti Hyseni	17 July 2007 (age 19)	(Danish Football Association) Sønderjyske
	FW	Julius Lucena	5 March 2008 (age 18)	(Danish Football Association) Esbjerg fB
	FW	Malik Pimpong	1 January 2008 (age 18)	(Danish Football Association) Midtjylland
	FW	Nicolas Gammelgaard	6 November 2008 (age 18)	(Danish Football Association) Vejle
	FW	Hjalte Boe	15 October 2007 (age 19)	(Danish Football Association) Nordsjælland
	FW	Julius Emefile	2 April 2007 (age 19)	(Danish Football Association) Midtjylland
	FW	Hjalte Lærke	23 April 2007 (age 19)	(Italian Football Federation) Lecce
	FW	Jacob Ambæk	28 March 2008 (age 18)	(Danish Football Association) Brøndby
	FW	Alfred Gøthler	24 June 2007 (age 19)	(Danish Football Association) HB Køge
	FW	Oskar Fenger	7 March 2008 (age 18)	(Danish Football Association) Brøndby

== UEFA European Under-19 Championship ==
Winners Runners-up Third place Tournament hosted

UEFA European Under-19 Championship										Qualification						
Year	Host	Round	Pld	W	D	L	F	A	Squad							
2002	Norway	Did not qualify														
2003	Liechtenstein	Did not qualify														
2004	Switzerland	Did not qualify														
2005	Northern Ireland	Did not qualify														
2006	Poland	Did not qualify														
2007	Austria	Did not qualify														
2008	Czech Republic	Did not qualify														
2009	Ukraine	Did not qualify														
2010	France	Did not qualify														
2011	Romania	Did not qualify														
2012	Estonia	Did not qualify														
2013	Lithuania	Did not qualify														
2014	Hungary	Did not qualify														
2015	Greece	Did not qualify														
2016	Germany	Did not qualify														
2017	Georgia	Did not qualify														
2018	Finland	Did not qualify														
2019	Armenia	Did not qualify														
2020	Northern Ireland	Cancelled														
2021	Romania	Cancelled														
2022	Slovakia	Did not qualify														
2023	Malta|	Did not qualify														
2024	Northern Ireland	Group stage	3	0	1	2	6	9	Squad	1st	6	5	1	0	14	4
2025	Romania	Group stage	3	1	0	2	5	4	Squad	1st	6	6	0	0	13	3
2026	Wales	Group stage	4	1	1	2	6	7	Squad	1st	6	4	1	1	18	2
2027	Czech Republic	To be determined								To be determined						
Total:3/25		Group stage	10	2	2	6	17	20	—	—	-	-	-	-	-	-

== See also ==
- Denmark men's national football team
- Denmark men's national under-21 football team
- Denmark men's national under-17 football team
- Denmark women's national football team
- Denmark women's national under-19 football team
- Denmark women's national under-17 football team
