= 2025–26 Viborg FF season =

Danish football club season

Viborg FF
2025–26 season
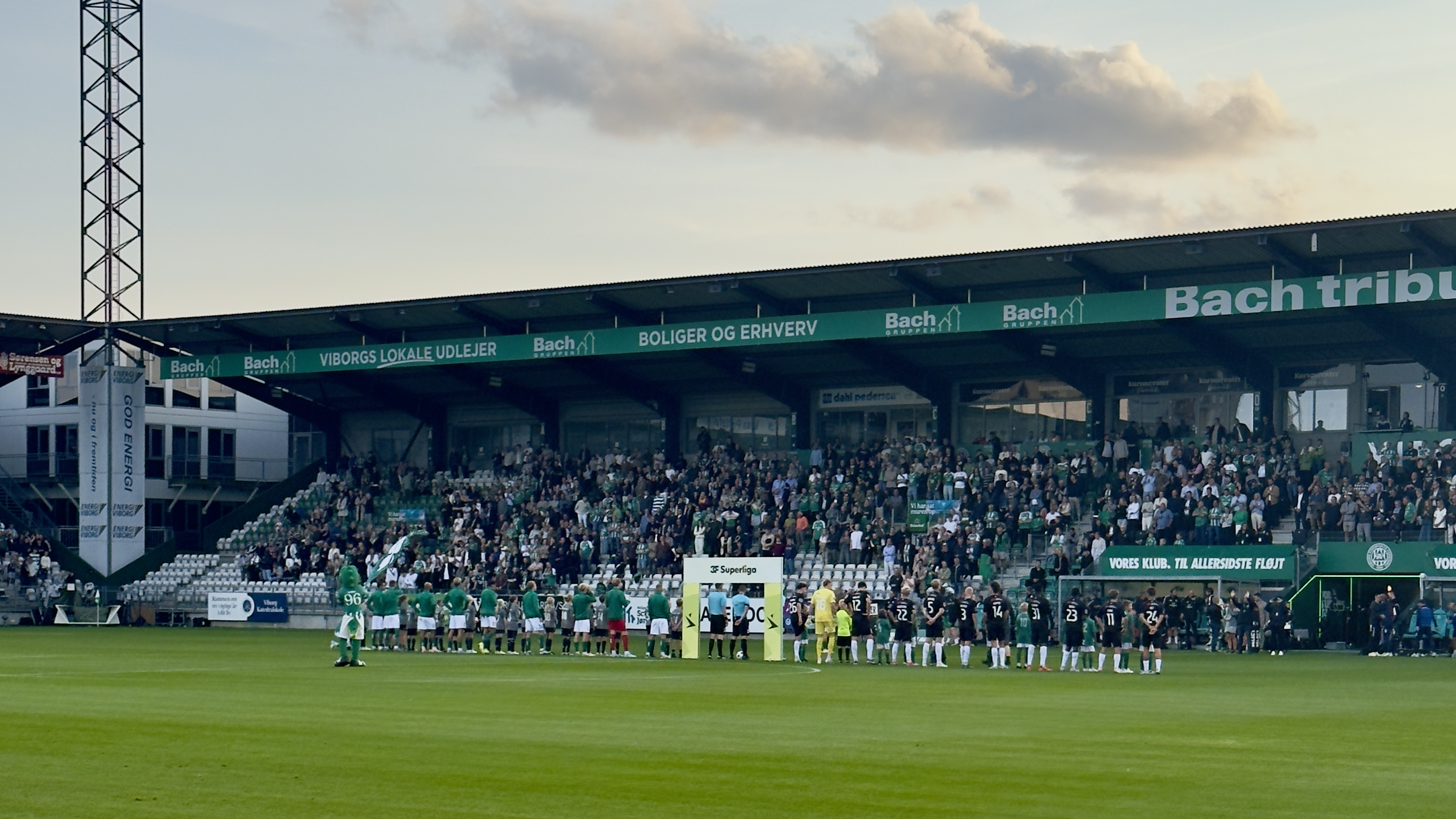
- Pre-match between Viborg and Sønderjyske
- Chairman: Kim Nielsen
- Head coach: Jakob Poulsen; (until 20 June); Nickolai Lund; (from 16 July)
- Stadium: Energi Viborg Arena
- Danish Superliga: 5th
- Danish Cup: Semi-final
- Top goalscorer: League: Charly Nouck (6); All: Charly Nouck (7)
- Highest home attendance: 8,430; (vs Copenhagen, 7 March 2026)
- Lowest home attendance: 3,490; (vs Vejle, 3 December 2025)
- Average home league attendance: 6,319
- Biggest win: 6–0; (24 September 2025 vs. BV Oksbøl)
- Biggest defeat: 2–5; (22 February 2026 vs. AGF)

The 2025–26 season was the 129th season in the history of Viborg FF, and their fifth consecutive year in the Danish Superliga, the top level of football in Denmark. During the season, the club competed in the Danish Superliga and the Danish Cup, the country's official knockout tournament.

Head coach Jakob Poulsen departed the club on 20 June 2025 after agreeing to become the head coach of fellow Superliga club AGF. Nickolai Lund, who joined Viborg as an assistant in May, was promoted to interim head coach on 16 July. Viborg announced on 24 July they had promoted Lund to permanent head coach, as he signed a three-year deal with the club.

The club played in the championship round during the spring, only their second time of doing so under the league's existing format. After a series of losses, including four losses in the final six matches, the team finished 5th in the league. Much like the previous season, in the Danish Cup, the team managed to get to the semi-finals before being eliminated by Copenhagen for the second consecutive season.

== Pre-season and friendlies ==
Viborg announced their preseason schedule on 25 June 2025, featuring home matches against Randers and AaB, and an away fixture against newly promoted Danish Superliga side Fredericia. The team opened their preseason campaign with a friendly against Randers at Energi Viborg Arena on 28 June, led by interim coach Nickolai Lund following Jakob Poulsen's departure the previous week. The squad included most regular first-team players as well as six members of the under-19 team. Randers secured a 2–0 win with goals from Oliver Olsen and Stephen Odey, while Viborg fielded 22 players over the course of the match.

The following Saturday, 5 July, Viborg faced Fredericia in a match consisting of two 60-minute halves. At Monjasa Park, Fredericia's Gustav Marcussen opened the scoring in the 9th minute, but Viborg responded before the interval with goals from Anosike Ementa and Charly Nouck in the 20th and 23rd minutes, respectively. Viborg introduced a new lineup for the second half and went on to score five additional goals, earning a 7–1 victory.

Viborg's final preseason match took place on 12 July against recently relegated AaB. After an evenly contested first half, Nouck gave Viborg the lead heading into the break with a goal in the 41st minute. Yonis Njoh, who joined the club on a permanent transfer earlier in the summer, extended the advantage with a goal in the 65th minute. Viborg held on for a 2–0 win in their final friendly before the start of the Superliga season.

28 June 2025	Viborg	0–2	Randers	Viborg
12:00 CEST (UTC+2)		Report	Olsen 51'; Odey 70'	Stadium: Energi Viborg Arena

5 July 2025	Fredericia	1–7	Viborg	Fredericia
13:00 CEST (UTC+2)	Marcussen 9'	Report	Ementa 20'; Nouck 23'; Jørgensen 66'; Serginho 84'; Júnior 96', 118'; Damkjer 116'	Stadium: Monjasa Park

12 July 2025	Viborg	2–0	AaB	Viborg
12:00 CEST (UTC+2)	Nouck 41'; Njoh 65'	Report		Stadium: Energi Viborg Arena

=== Winter break ===
On 18 December 2025, Viborg announced their training schedule during the Superliga's annual winter break. The club announced two fixtures against Superliga clubs, as well as three exhibition matches taking place in Alicante, Spain, against Polish clubs Piast Gliwice and Śląsk Wrocław, and one against Swedish club Kalmar FF.

Viborg lost 2–0 away to Randers in their first pre-season friendly of the new year, a match primarily used to give playing time to the full squad as well as reserved. Viborg held possession for long periods but did not convert their opportunities, while Randers were clinical, with Hector Lux scoring in the first half and Musa Toure adding a second after the break. Despite positive passages of play, the match highlighted areas for improvement in Viborg's attacking efficiency.

Viborg next played fellow Superliga club Vejle on 17 January, with the match again being used to provide playing time across the squad. Viborg had more possession in the opening stages and created the first scoring opportunities, including a chance for Dorian Jr. The visitors took the lead shortly before half-time when Thomas Jørgensen scored following a move involving Asker Beck on the left side. Vejle equalized early in the second half after a turnover in Viborg's buildup was converted by Mikkel Duelund. Viborg regained a measure of control as the half progressed and applied pressure in the final stages. No further goals were scored, with Filip Đukić making a key save to keep the match level.

13 January 2026	Randers	0–2	Viborg	Randers
11:30 CET (UTC+1)	Lux 13'; Toure 81'	Report

17 January 2026	Vejle	1–1	Viborg	Vejle
12:00 CET (UTC+1)	Duelund 46'	Report	Jørgensen 40'

== Superliga ==
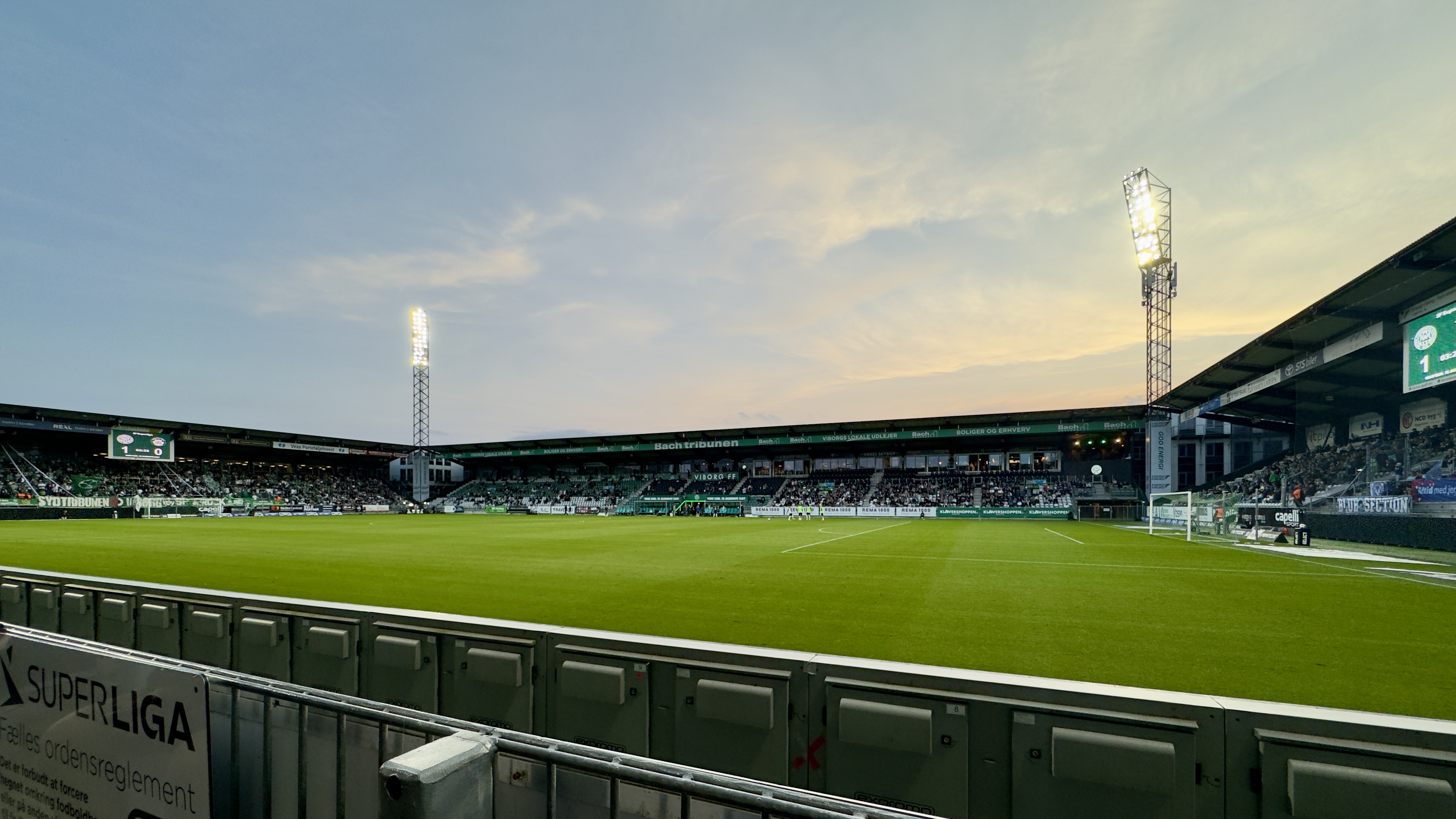
Energi Viborg Arena hosted the opening fixture of the Superliga season on 18 July 2025.

One week after the conclusion of the 2024–25 Danish Superliga season on 6 June, the league released the fixture list for the first seven matchdays. Viborg were scheduled to open the 2025–26 campaign on Friday, 18 July 2025, against defending champions Copenhagen at Energi Viborg Arena. The match marked the managerial debut of interim head coach Nickolai Lund, who had been appointed two days earlier. Lund had joined Viborg in May, six months after departing Copenhagen.

Viborg captain Jeppe Grønning scored the first goal of the Superliga season, converting a penalty in the 24th minute. Copenhagen equalised before halftime when Elias Achouri, a former Viborg player who had departed in 2023, levelled the score at 1–1 in the 37th minute. Shortly after the break, Mohamed Elyounoussi gave the visitors a narrow lead. Mads Søndergaard brought Viborg back on level terms in the 73rd minute, scoring from a corner delivered by Serginho. The draw was short-lived as Magnus Mattsson converted a penalty after Jean-Manuel Mbom was adjudged to have committed a foul inside the box. Both teams created chances in the closing minutes; however, Copenhagen held on for a 3–2 victory at Energi Viborg Arena. Nickolai Lund led Viborg as head coach in a match against OB, having been named as permanent head coach on 24 July. His first match ended in defeat at Nature Energy Park when OB took a 3–0 lead in the second half, after former Viborg defender Nicolas Bürgy scored twice against his old club. Viborg nearly scored in the 60th minute before the goal was ruled offside by VAR. The game ended 3–1 despite a late goal from Charly Nouck, who joined Viborg from OB in 2024.

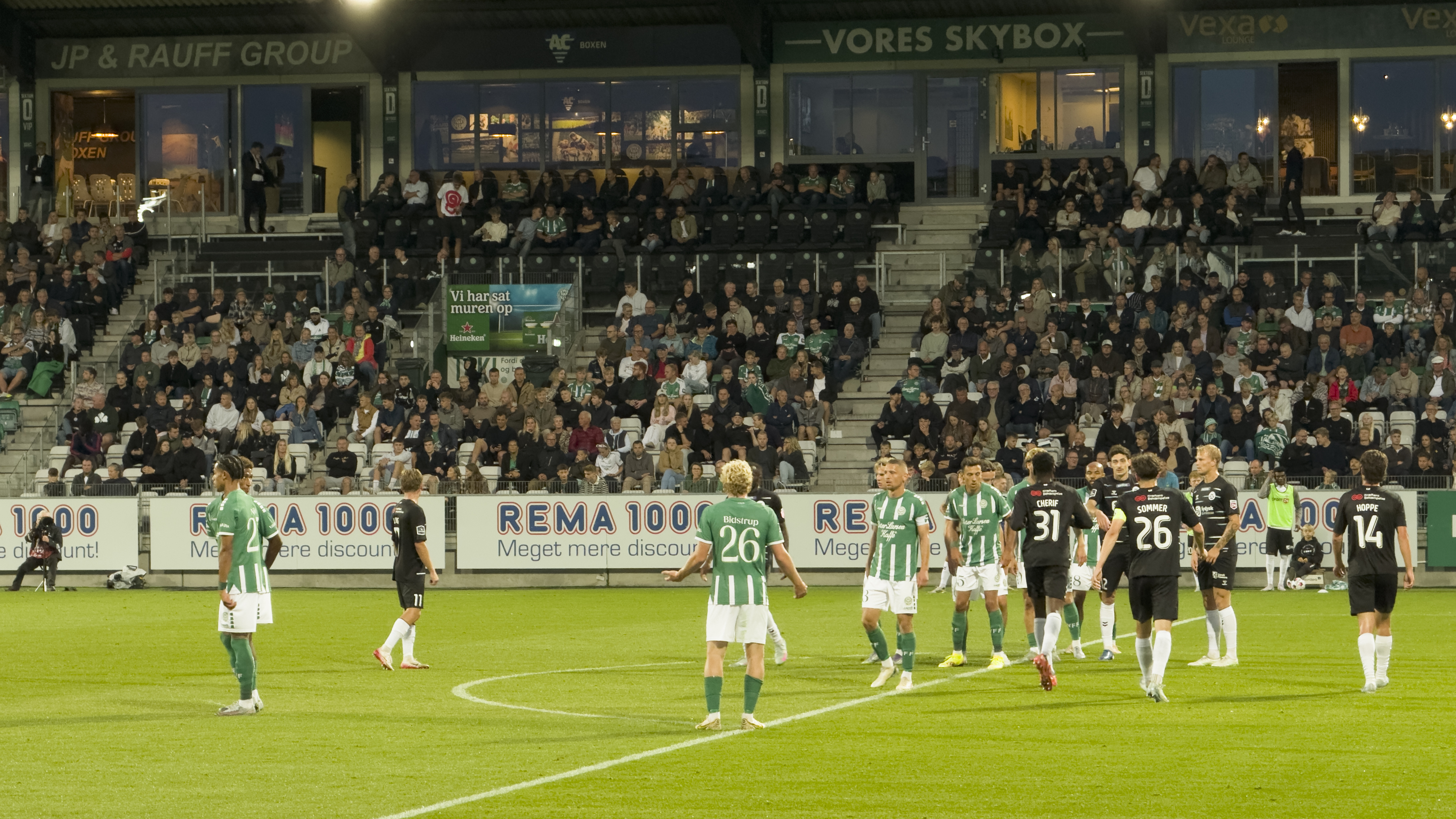
Viborg in action against Sønderjyske (in black)

The first match of August gave Viborg their first win of the season, a 2–0 result against Brøndby with goals from Yonis Njoh and Anosike Ementa in each half respectively. The club's first home game of August was played on Friday, 8 August, and gave them their second consecutive victory when Mads Søndergaard scored in the 33rd minute against Sønderjyske. Despite a late opportunity from Kristall Máni Ingason, Viborg held on to win and move themselves up to 4th place in the league. Silkeborg visited Energi Viborg Arena in the following week and got off to a fast start against Viborg, with Alexander Busch scoring in just the second minute of the match and Tonni Adamsen adding a second in the 11th minute. Viborg fought back with Mads Søndergaard scoring his third goal of the season, and Jakob Vester scoring to make it 2–2. Tim Freriks momentarily gave Viborg a 3–2 lead right before the halftime break; however, it was ruled out following a VAR review to keep the scores level. The second half again saw Freriks score following a corner kick before VAR ruled out a goal for the second time. The game ended with a 3–2 victory for Silkeborg, following a handball penalty kick, which was converted by Jens Martin Gammelby. The club traveled to Farum to face Nordsjælland, who were entering the game having lost four consecutive matches. Nordsjælland got off to an early start when Sindre Walle Egeli gave the home team an early 1–0 lead in the fourth minute, which was the score at the halftime break. Both clubs continued a back-and-forth for the rest of the game, though neither side was able to find the back of the net, with Nordsjælland managing their first victory in five matches. In a short turnaround of four days, Viborg traveled to face last-place Vejle on Friday, 29 August. Andrew Hjulsager gave Vejle an early 1–0 lead when he scored in the 15th minute, however Viborg's Mads Søndergaard would level the score again in the 40th minute for this fourth goal of the season. In the 54th minute, Charly Nouck scored his first goal of the season to give Viborg a 2–1 lead and the win. Viborg finished August with three wins and two losses as the league entered into a two week international break.

Following a two-week international break, AGF traveled to Viborg for their first match of September. This was Jakob Poulsen's first match against Viborg since leaving during the previous summer. The visiting side scored an early goal from Nicolai Poulsen in the 14th minute, following a corner kick. The lead was short-lived as Thomas Jørgensen scored his first goal of the season just four minutes later. Following a handball from Jeppe Grønning minutes later, AGF were awarded a penalty kick which Kristian Arnstad converted to return the lead to the visitors. The remainder of the match continued to see other chances by both sides; however, no other goals would get past either goalkeeper and Viborg was left with a 1–2 loss, moving them down to 9th in the Superliga table. On 20 September, Viborg travelled to Herning to face their rival FC Midtjylland in hadets kamp (lit. 'the Battle of Hatred'), in a game which had fighting between fans of each club. The first half of the match went without significant action from either side, sending both teams into the break at 0–0. While Viborg goalkeeper Lucas Lund kept out the home team, Midtjylland did break through with the game's first goal in the 79th minute. Philip Billing scored a goal at close-range following an initial save from Lund. Late intro extra time, Cho Gue-sung guaranteed a victory for Midtjylland with a goal to cement a 2–0 final score. In the last weekend of October, the club met Danish Superliga newcomers FC Fredericia, who were in their first season in Denmark's top division., as both teams were seeking their first league win in September. Dutch forward Tim Freriks almost gave Viborg an early lead; however, his shot went over the crossbar to keep the game scoreless. In the 15th minute, Gustav Marcussen sent Fredericia into the lead following a corner kick. The lead lasted only seven minutes when Freriks was able to make up for his earlier miss. Yonis Njoh made his return following an injury which kept him out of action since early August, coming on as a substitute in the 74th minute. He ended up scoring the winning goal 15 minutes later, securing the victory for Viborg 2–1. The win sent Viborg to sixth place in the league standings.

Viborg began October at Cepheus Park Randers to take on Randers on 5 October, where all goals were scored within the first third of the match. Randers left-back Nikolas Dyhr scored first with a 13th minute goal from close range, and teammates Mohamed Toure scoring just two minutes later to give the home team an early 2–0 lead. Dutch forward Tim Freriks scored his second Superliga goal for Viborg in the 26th minute, bringing the score back to 2–1. No more goals were scored during the game, though both sides picked up a pair of yellow cards, and the game ended in favour of Randers. Head coach Nickolai Lund expressed frustration following the match as Viborg had several opportunities to equalise but did not do so. Following a two-week international break, Viborg suffered a second consecutive defeat as they hosted OB on 19 October. Viborg took the lead early through Jakob Vester's goal in the opening minutes of the match, where the game stayed at 1–0 through the rest of the opening half. OB equalized after the break via Noah Ganaus in the 57th minute, before Jona Niemiec scored the decisive goal in a 2–1 away victory. The result marked Viborg's fourth defeat in five league matches, while OB secured three important points on the road. In the 13th round of the season, Copenhagen drew 0–0 at home against Viborg, a result that extended FCK's challenging run of form. Copenhagen controlled possession in the second half and registered several chances, but were denied by Viborg's defense and key saves by Lucas Lund. The draw left Copenhagen in third place with 22 points, while Viborg climbed to tenth place with 13 points from 13 matches.

On 2 November, Viborg recorded a victory over Randers in a match decided in stoppage time. Thomas Jørgensen scored in the opening minutes for a 1–0 Viborg lead, before Mohamed Toure brought the teams back level in the 12th minute. Within several minutes, Srđan Kuzmić restored Viborg's lead after a shot from close range went into the goal. Toure sent the teams into halftime at 2–2 when he scored his second of the game in the 41st minute. Randers would pick up four yellow cards in the second half as the two teams became physical with each other. The final goal came in stoppage time after Wessel Dammers, following a shot from Viborg's Charly Nouck, sent the ball into his own goal to give Viborg a late 3–2 win. In the following match, Viborg met Fredericia after having previously beaten them two weeks prior in the Danish Cup. While the first half remained scoreless, Viborg made the most of their chances in the second half with a goal from Charly Nouck in the 51st minute, with Fredericia defender Frederik Rieper scoring an own goal two minutes later with a header. Viborg defender Stipe Radić scored his first of the season late in the game, ensuring a Viborg victory and moving the team into mid-table in the Superliga.

Following back-to-back wins, Viborg took on Vejle at home on 23 November. The visitors took an early lead when Anders K. Jacobsen scored in the 10th minute. The rest of the first half went in favor of Viborg, following goals from Charly Nouck in the 17th minute and Lasse Flø own goal in the 24th minute. Tim Freriks scored in the 40th before Nouck scored his second of the match, giving Viborg a 4–1 lead at halftime. Christian Gammelgaard cut into the lead in the 63rd minute before Mads Søndergaard secured a Viborg win in the 90th minute with his sixth goal of the season. The final match of November took place Sydbank Park as Sønderjyske hosted Viborg. The home team took a very early lead when Mads Agger headed the ball into the net in the 3rd minute. Viborg had several chances to equalise in the rest of the period, though it remained 1–0 at halftime. Agger doubled the score in the 53rd minute, before Bilal Brahimi answered back two minutes later for 2–1. After a missed Sønderjyske opportunity to score from Kristall Máni Ingason, Viborg's counter-attack made a difference in the closing minutes when Thomas Jørgensen in the 86th minute. After VAR upheld the goal, the game ended 2–2. Viborg's last match before the winter break was against rival FC Midtjylland at home. Viborg capitalised on early mistakes from the visitors and took a 2–0 in the first half with goals from Bilal Brahimi and Tim Freriks. Midtjylland composed themselves and fought back in the second half. Goals from Valdemar Byskov and Martin Erlić brought the game back to 2–2 by the 69th minute. Mads Bech Sørensen completed Midtjylland's comeback in the 87th minute for a 3–2 lead in the closing minutes. Viborg's Mees Hoedemakers put the game back level, scoring in the 92nd minute to prevent Midtjylland from taking a victory, the game ending 3–3.

In the first match back following the winter break, Viborg traveled to take on Silkeborg on 8 February. While Viborg controlled the opening half, the game remained scoreless by halftime. The breakthrough came through when defender Srđan Kuzmić sent a volley into the back of the net for a 1–0 lead for Viborg. Goalkeeper Lucas Lund kept Viborg's lead intact with several late saves against Silkeborg's attack, securing the win for the visitors. The following week, Viborg hosted Brøndby as they pushed for the upper-half of the league table. After just 68 seconds, Srđan Kuzmić scored again to give Viborg a 1–0 lead following a deflected cross. Viborg maintained control for the first half, though missed one opportunity to double their advantage. Brøndby applied more pressure after halftime, requiring Viborg's Lucas Lund again to make crucial saves. Viborg held on for a second consecutive victory with a single goal from Kuzmić. The move momentarily moved Viborg to 4th place in the Superliga. It was their first home win over Brøndby in 7,259 days.

Viborg next played AGF, who were looking to maintain their position on top of the Superliga table. Midway through the first half, a controversial situation arose when Charly Nouck went down near the corner of the penalty area. The referee did not award a foul, and VAR did not intervene. AGF took the lead in the 31st minute through Kevin Yakob, giving the home team a narrow advantage at halftime. Dorian Jr. scored his first Superliga goal ten minutes after halftime, leveling the game at 1–1. AGF then scored three goals in quick succession, with Yakob scoring a second goal and Kristian Arnstad scoring to make it 3–1. Minutes later, following a challenge from Mikkel Løndal, AGF were awarded a penalty which was converted by Arnstad. Another goal was added minutes later by AGF's Gift Links for a 5–1 lead. Viborg newcomer Osman Addo scored in his Superliga debut for the club as a consolation goal in a 5–2 AGF win. Viborg hosted FC Nordsjælland on 1 March, with both teams competing to remain in the top six to advance to the championship round. Viborg took an early lead in the 8th minute when Sami Jalal headed a cross into the back of the net. The game remained 1–0 at halftime following several saves from Nordsjælland goalkeeper Andreas Hansen. Debutant Lamine Sadio scored for the visitors to equalise the game again at 1–1. Hjalte Bidstrup restored Viborg's lead in the 72nd minute with his first goal for the club, which ultimately secured the win for Viborg and a top-half finish in the Superliga. The win confirmed Viborg would move to the championship round for only the second time under the league's format.

=== Results ===
18 July 2025 1	Viborg	2–3	Copenhagen	Viborg
19:00 CEST (UTC+2)	Grønning 24' (pen.); Søndergaard 73'	Report	Achouri 37'; Elyounouss 65'; Mattsson 78' (pen.)	Stadium: Energi Viborg Arena; Attendance: 6,696; Referee: Sandi Putros

27 July 2025 2	OB	3–1	Viborg	Odense
14:00 CEST (UTC+2)	Ganaus 42'; Bürgy 57', 63'	Report	Nouck 85'	Stadium: Nature Energy Park; Attendance: 12,394; Referee: Michael Tykgaard

3 August 2025 3	Brøndby	0–2	Viborg	Brøndbyvester
18:00 CEST (UTC+2)		Report	Njoh 44'; Ementa 52'	Stadium: Brøndby Stadium; Attendance: 21,909; Referee: Jakob Alexander Sundberg

8 August 2025 4	Viborg	1–0	Sønderjyske	Viborg
20:00 CEST (UTC+2)	Søndergaard 33'	Report		Stadium: Energi Viborg Arena; Attendance: 5,622; Referee: Mads-Kristoffer Kristoffersen

17 August 2025 5	Viborg	2–3	Silkeborg	Viborg
16:00 CEST (UTC+2)	Søndergaard 18'; Vester 39'	Report	Busch 2'; Adamsen 11'; Gammelby 90+1' (pen.)	Stadium: Energi Viborg Arena; Attendance: 6,387; Referee: Jacob Karlsen

25 August 2025 6	Nordsjælland	1–0	Viborg	Farum
19:00 CEST (UTC+2)	Egeli 4'	Report		Stadium: Right to Dream Park; Attendance: 3,175; Referee: Mikkel Redder

29 August 2025 7	Vejle	1–2	Viborg	Vejle
19:00 CEST (UTC+2)	Hjulsager 15'	Report	Søndergaard 40'; Nouck 54'	Stadium: Vejle Stadium; Attendance: 7,894; Referee: Lasse Graagaard

14 September 2025 8	Viborg	1–2	AGF	Viborg
14:00 CEST (UTC+2)	Jørgensen 18'	Report	Poulsen 14'; Arnstad 26' (pen.)	Stadium: Energi Viborg Arena; Attendance: 7,655; Referee: Svend Funder

20 September 2025 9	Midtjylland	2–0	Viborg FF	Herning
18:00 CEST (UTC+2)	Billing 79'; Cho 90+6'	Report		Stadium: MCH Arena; Attendance: 11,440; Referee: Sandi Putros

28 September 2025 10	Viborg	2–1	FC Fredericia	Viborg
14:00 CEST (UTC+2)	Freriks 22'; Njoh 89'	Report	Marcussen 15'	Stadium: Energi Viborg Arena; Attendance: 5,330; Referee: Jakob Kehlet

5 October 2025 11	Randers	2–1	Viborg	Randers
12:00 CEST (UTC+2)	Dyhr 13'; Toure 15'	Report	Freriks 26'	Stadium: Cepheus Park Randers; Attendance: 5,888; Referee: Michael Tykgaard

19 October 2025 12	Viborg	1–2	OB	Viborg
14:00 CEST (UTC+2)	Vester 5'	Report	Ganaus 57'; Niemiec 60'	Stadium: Energi Viborg Arena; Attendance: 5,560; Referee: Sandi Putros

26 October 2025 13	Copenhagen	0–0	Viborg	Copenhagen
19:00 CET (UTC+1)		Report		Stadium: Parken Stadium; Attendance: 20,485; Referee: Mads-Kristoffer Kristoffersen

2 November 2025 14	Viborg	3–2	Randers	Viborg
14:00 CET (UTC+1)	Jørgensen 8'; Kuzmić 15'; Dammers 90+4' (o.g.)	Report	Toure 12', 41'	Stadium: Energi Viborg Arena; Attendance: 5,028; Referee: Jakob Kehlet

9 November 2025 15	Fredericia	0–3	Viborg	Fredericia
14:00 CET (UTC+1)		Report	Nouck 53'; Rieper 55' (o.g.); Radić 79'	Stadium: Monjasa Park; Attendance: 2,057; Referee: Mikkel Redder

23 November 2025 16	Viborg	5–2	Vejle	Viborg
14:00 CET (UTC+1)	Nouck 17', 42'; Flø 24' (o.g.); Freriks 40' (pen.); Søndergaard 90'	Report	Jacobsen 10'; Gammelgaard 63'	Stadium: Energi Viborg Arena; Attendance: 4,467; Referee: Svend Funder

28 November 2025 17	Sønderjyske	2–2	Viborg	Haderslev
19:00 CET (UTC+1)	Agger 3', 53'	Report	Brahimi 55'; Jørgensen 86'	Stadium: Sydbank Park; Attendance: 4,125; Referee: Jens Grabski Maae

7 December 2025 18	Viborg	3–3	Midtjylland	Viborg
14:00 CET (UTC+1)	Brahimi 18'; Freriks 37'; Hoedemakers 90+2'	Report	Byskov 58'; Erlić 69'; Sørensen 87'	Stadium: Energi Viborg Arena; Attendance: 7,699; Referee: Michael Tykgaard

8 February 2026 19	Silkeborg	0–1	Viborg	Silkeborg
14:00 CET (UTC+1)		Report	Kuzmić 60'	Stadium: JYSK Park; Attendance: 2,733; Referee: Mikkel Redder

15 February 2026 20	Viborg	1–0	Brøndby	Viborg
18:00 CET (UTC+1)	Kuzmić 2'	Report		Stadium: Energi Viborg Arena; Attendance: 6,040; Referee: Aydin Uslu

22 February 2026 21	AGF	5–2	Viborg	Aarhus
18:00 CET (UTC+1)	Yakob 31', 57'; Arnstad 60', 64' (pen.); Links 70'	Report	Dorian Jr. 55'; Addo 90+5'	Stadium: Vejlby Stadium; Referee: Lasse Graagaard

1 March 2026 22	Viborg	2–1	Nordsjælland	Viborg
17:00 CET (UTC+1)	Jalal 8'; Bidstrup 72'	Report	Sadio 62'	Stadium: Energi Viborg Arena; Attendance: 6,180; Referee: Morten Krogh

15 March 2026 23	Brøndby	0–1	Viborg	Brøndbyvester
17:00 CET (UTC+1)		Report	Anyembe 77'	Stadium: Brøndby Stadium; Referee: Mads-Kristoffer Kristoffersen

22 March 2026 24	Viborg	1–1	Midtjylland	Viborg
19:00 CET (UTC+1)	Dorian Jr. 70'	Report	Byskov 53'	Stadium: Energi Viborg Arena; Attendance: 7,334; Referee: Michael Tykgaard

6 April 2026 25	Viborg	1–2	AGF	Viborg
18:00 CEST (UTC+2)	Jalal 7'	Report	Serra 14', 41'	Stadium: Energi Viborg Arena; Attendance: 8,134; Referee: Jakob Alexander Sundberg

12 April 2026 26	Sønderjyske	0–2	Viborg	Haderslev
14:00 CEST (UTC+2)		Report	Kirkegaard 48'; Addo 90+1'	Stadium: Sydbank Park; Referee: Jakob Kehlet

19 April 2026 27	Nordsjælland	2–1	Viborg	Farum
16:00 CEST (UTC+2)	Amoako Jr. 32'; Janssen 90'	Report	Nouck 19'	Stadium: Right to Dream Park; Attendance: 4,089; Referee: Frederik Veis Svendsen

22 April 2026 28	Viborg	0–1	Brøndby	Viborg
20:00 CEST (UTC+2)		Report	Dennis 90+1'	Stadium: Energi Viborg Arena; Attendance: 7,049; Referee: Svend Funder-Kristensen

26 April 2026 29	Viborg	1–0	Nordsjælland	Viborg
18:00 CEST (UTC+2)	Kuzmić 10'	Report		Stadium: Energi Viborg Arena; Attendance: 5,671; Referee: Michael Tykgaard

4 May 2026 30	Midtjylland	3–3	Viborg	Herning
19:00 CEST (UTC+2)	Osorio 36'; Bravo 45+2'; Erlić 80'	Report	Beck 33', 45'; Dorian Jr. 89'	Stadium: MCH Arena; Attendance: 11,906; Referee: Jakob Kehlet

10 May 2026 31	Viborg	0–1	Sønderjyske	Viborg
19:00 CEST (UTC+2)		Report	Emini 49'	Stadium: Energi Viborg Arena; Attendance: 7,023; Referee: Aydin Uslu

17 May 2026 32	AGF	4–1	Viborg	Aarhus
18:00 CEST (UTC+2)	Emmery 1'; Mortensen 27'; Links 35'; Jørgensen 70'; Kristjánsson 86', 90+5'	Report	Jørgensen 34'; Kirkegaard 90+2'	Stadium: Vejlby Stadium; Referee: Sandi Putros

=== League table ===
==== Regular season ====
Pos	Team	Pld	W	D	L	GF	GA	GD	Pts	Qualification
3	Sønderjyske	22	10	6	6	34	28	+6	36	Qualification for the Championship round
4	Brøndby	22	10	4	8	31	22	+9	34	Qualification for the Championship round
5	Viborg	22	10	3	9	37	35	+2	33	Qualification for the Championship round
6	Nordsjælland	22	10	1	11	37	39	−2	31	Qualification for the Championship round
7	Copenhagen	22	8	5	9	35	34	+1	29	Qualification for the Relegation round

Source: Danish Football Association (in Danish), Soccerway
Rules for classification: 1) Points; 2) Goal difference; 3) Goals scored; 4) Away goals scored; 5) Play-off (played on neutral ground if determining teams for different rounds); 6) Draw.

==== Championship round ====
Pos	Team	Pld	W	D	L	GF	GA	GD	Pts	
2	Midtjylland	32	16	12	4	72	36	+36	60	Qualification for the Europa League second qualifying round (Note: The 2025–26 Danish Cup winners (Midtjylland) qualify for the Europa League second qualifying round.)
3	Nordsjælland	32	15	5	12	51	46	+5	50	Qualification for the Conference League second qualifying round
4	Brøndby	32	13	6	13	44	35	+9	45	Qualification for the European play-off match
5	Viborg	32	13	5	14	49	51	−2	44	
6	Sønderjyske	32	12	8	12	44	49	−5	44	

Source: Danish Football Association (in Danish), Soccerway
Rules for classification: 1) Points; 2) Goal difference; 3) Goals scored; 4) Away goals scored; 5) Play-off (played on neutral ground if determining teams for different rounds); 6) Draw.

== Danish Cup ==
=== Early rounds ===
As Viborg finished the previous Superliga season in 8th place, they entered into the cup competition in the second round. The club finished the previous season's cup competition in the semi-final, being eliminated by eventual champion Copenhagen 2–0 on aggregate.

On 12 August 2025, Viborg's second round opposition was determined when AC Horsens secured a 2–1 victory over Næsby in the first round of the competition. The match was scheduled for 4 September and was the second consecutive season in which Viborg met the 1st Division club in the second round. Despite an early chance from Viborg, the game remained without a goal in the first half. In the second half, Viborg would capitalise on a chance in the 57th minute when Dutch forward Tim Freriks scored his first goal for the club following a pass from teammate Jakob Vester. With late pressure, Horsens were unable to equalise and were eliminated from the cup as Viborg left with a 1–0 victory in front of 1,469 spectators.

Following their second round victory, Viborg was drawn against BV Oksbøl. As Superliga clubs are not allowed to be drawn against each other, Viborg was scheduled to play against a team in the Denmark Series, the fifth tier of Danish football. The two teams met on 24 September at Oksbøl Stadion in Oksbøl, with Viborg running away with a 6–0 victory. Bilal Brahimi scored his first goal for the club in the 12th minute, with Dorian Jr. following with his first Viborg goal to make it 2–0 in the 16th minute. Frederik Damkjer made it 3–0 heading into the halftime break. The second half included another flurry of goals with Asker Beck scoring in the 60th and 72nd minutes, with Yonis Njoh making his return from injury with a goal of his own. Filip Đukić, who joined Viborg in July 2025, marked his debut for the club with a clean sheet. The game marked debuts for several Viborg youth players, including Adam Kleis-Kristoffersen.

Viborg were drawn to face fellow Superliga club FC Fredericia in the fourth round at Monjasa Park. Viborg took an early lead after a foul by Jeppe Kudsk awarded them a penalty, which captain Jeppe Grønning successfully converted. Fredericia equalized shortly afterward when Sofus Johannesen scored from close range, sending the teams into halftime tied at 1–1. Substitute Oscar Buch gave Fredericia a 2–1 lead in the 82nd minute, scoring 20 minutes after entering the match. However, Viborg forward Charly Nouck leveled the score ten minutes later, making it 2–2 at the end of regular time. The match proceeded to extra time, but neither side managed to find a decisive goal, leading to a penalty shoot-out. Viborg converted four of their five attempts, defeating Fredericia 4–2 on penalties to advance to the next round.

4 September 2025 Second round	AC Horsens	0–1	Viborg	Horsens
18:30 CEST (UTC+2)		Report	Freriks 57'	Stadium: Nordstern Arena Horsens; Attendance: 1,469; Referee: Jens Maae

24 September 2025 Third round	BV Oksbøl	0–6	Viborg	Oksbøl
16:00 CEST (UTC+2)		Report	Brahimi 13'; Dorian Jr. 16'; Damkjer 23'; Beck 60', 72'; Njoh 69'	Stadium: Oksbøl Stadion; Attendance: 1,971

29 October 2025 Fourth round	FC Fredericia	2–2 (a.e.t.) (2–4 p)	Viborg	Fredericia
18:00 CET (UTC+1)	Johannesen 33'; Buch 82'	Report	Grønning 30' (pen.); Nouck 86'	Stadium: Monjasa Park
	Penalties
	Madsen (penalty missed); Simonsen (penalty scored); Nygaard (penalty missed); Rieper (penalty scored)		Freriks (penalty scored); Kirkegaard (penalty scored); Anyembe (penalty scored); Vester (penalty missed); Mbom (penalty scored)

=== Quarter-finals ===
For a second consecutive season, Viborg reached the quarter-finals of the Danish Cup. They were drawn against fellow Superliga club Vejle as the competition entered a two-legged format. The two teams met at Energi Viborg Arena for the first leg of the cup tie on 3 December, with Viborg starting strong with a goal from Dorian Jr. in the 12th minute. Despite multiple chances, including Sami Jalal hitting the goal post twice, the game remained at 1–0 for halftime. Like the first half, Viborg scored in the opening minutes of the second half with a goal from Bilal Brahimi. Three minutes after coming into the game as a substitute, Asker Beck scored to give Viborg a comfortable 3–0 lead. After a late goal from Vejle's Alexi Pitu, Viborg restored the three-goal lead when Frederik Damkjer scored to help Viborg defeat Vejle 4–1.

The second leg of the quarter-final saw less action as Viborg and Vejle played to a 0–0 score at halftime, with a missed chance for Viborg right before the halftime break. The second chance saw more missed opportunities from Viborg, as Thomas Jørgensen set up two scoring opportunities for teammates which both missed giving the visiting team the lead. At the other end, the decisive moment came in the 74th minute when Frederik Damkjer fouled Jonathan Amon inside the penalty area. While the penalty was missed, Anders Jacobsen received the rebound and gave Vejle a 1–0 lead in the match. After a Daniel Anyembe red card in the 85th minute, Viborg were reduced to 10 players on the pitch but held on for a 4–2 aggregate victory over to advance to the semi-final for the second consecutive year.

3 December 2025 Quarter-final first leg	Viborg	4–1	Vejle	Viborg
20:15 CET (UTC+1)	Dorian Jr. 12'; Brahimi 54'; Beck 67'; Damkjer 90'	Report	Pitu 84'	Stadium: Energi Viborg Arena; Attendance: 3,490; Referee: Jacob Karlsen

13 December 2025 Quarter-final second leg	Vejle	1–0 (2–4 agg.)	Viborg	Vejle
15:00 CET (UTC+1)	Jacobsen 75'	Report	Anyembe (red card) 85'	Stadium: Vejle Stadium; Attendance: 2,793; Referee: Lasse Læbel Graagaard

=== Semi-finals ===
Following their quarter-final aggregate win, Viborg were drawn against defending champions Copenhagen. The first leg was scheduled during week 7 in February, with the first match played at Parken, and the return match in Viborg in early March.

The first leg was played on 11 February. Viborg captain Jeppe Grønning gave Viborg a 1–0 lead in the 7th minute. He was, however, ruled offside and the game remained scoreless. In the 14th minute, Copenhagen instead scored the first goal as William Clem put the ball past Viborg's goalkeeper Lucas Lund. The game was put level again in the 25th minute when Dorian Jr. scored following a cross from Charly Nouck. It remained 1–1 through the remainder of the half. Four minutes after the return from the halftime break, Elyounoussi restored Copenhagen's lead as he scored from a cross by teammate Oliver Højer. No more goals were scored during the match, though both teams both had opportunities. Copenhagen won the first leg 2–1, giving an advantage ahead of the second leg in March.

On 7 March, the second leg was played at Energi Viborg Arena. Viborg applied pressure early to Copenhagen's defence, but it was the visitors who scored the first goal. After a series of missed and blocked shots, Youssoufa Moukoko found the back of the net in the 29th minute to give Copenhagen a 1–0 lead in the match. The lead was doubled when Robert Silva appeared to score before the goal was ruled offside, keeping the score at 1–0. In the 37th minute, Viborg struck back when Thomas Jørgensen scored from outside the penalty area. Moukoko scored his second of the game very quickly after halftime, restoring Copenhagen's lead in the match. Viborg continued to pressure for the second half of the game, but was unable to find any goals of their own. The game ended 2–1, with Copenhagen advancing 4–2 on aggregate and, for the second consecutive season, knocking Viborg out of the Danish Cup in the semi-final.

11 February 2026 Semi-final first leg	Copenhagen	2–1	Viborg	Copenhagen
17:00 CET (UTC+1)	Clem 14'; Elyounoussi 49'	Report	Dorian Jr. 25'	Stadium: Parken; Attendance: 15,885; Referee: Mads-Kristoffer Kristoffersen

7 March 2026 Semi-final second leg	Viborg	1–2 (2–4 agg.)	Copenhagen	Viborg
17:00 CET (UTC+1)	Jørgensen 38'	Report	Moukoko 29', 46'	Stadium: Energi Viborg Arena; Attendance: 8,430; Referee: Aydin Uslu

== Squad statistics ==
As of 17 May 2026

No.	Pos	Player	Superliga		Danish Cup		Total	
No.	Pos	Player	Apps	Goals	Apps	Goals	Apps	Goals
1	GK	(Denmark) Lucas Lund	32	0	6	0	38	0
4	MF	(Netherlands) Mees Hoedemakers	19	1	6	0	25	1
5	DF	(Slovenia) Žan Zaletel	7	0	2	0	9	0
6	MF	(Denmark) Mads Søndergaard	23	5	5	0	28	5
7	FW	(France) Yonis Njoh	10	2	1	1	11	3
8	MF	(Denmark) Asker Beck	30	2	6	3	36	5
9	FW	(Netherlands) Tim Freriks	23	4	4	1	27	5
10	MF	(Denmark) Thomas Jørgensen	31	4	5	1	36	5
11	FW	(Denmark) Charly Nouck	29	6	4	1	33	7
13	MF	(Denmark) Jeppe Grønning	30	1	6	1	36	2
14	MF	(Iceland) Ísak Andri Sigurgeirsson	5	0	1	0	6	0
16	GK	(Montenegro) Filip Đukić	0	0	1	0	1	0
17	MF	(Somalia) Osman Addo	8	2	2	0	10	2
18	MF	(Germany) Jean-Manuel Mbom	23	0	6	0	29	0
19	FW	(Equatorial Guinea) Dorian Jr.	30	3	6	3	36	6
21	MF	(France) Bilal Brahimi	16	2	4	2	20	4
23	DF	(Denmark) Oliver Bundgaard	7	0	0	0	7	0
24	DF	(Kenya) Daniel Anyembe	29	1	5	0	34	1
26	DF	(Denmark) Hjalte Bidstrup	27	1	6	0	33	1
29	FW	(Denmark) Sami Jalal	31	2	5	0	36	2
30	DF	(Slovenia) Srđan Kuzmić	26	4	6	0	32	4
31	DF	(Denmark) Mikkel Løndal	1	0	2	0	3	0
32	DF	(Denmark) Lukas Kirkegaard	15	2	7	0	22	2
33	MF	(Denmark) Frederik Damkjer	7	0	3	2	10	2
34	MF	(Denmark) Philip Keller	0	0	1	0	1	0
36	FW	(Denmark) Adam Kleis-Kristoffersen	3	0	3	0	6	0
38	MF	(Denmark) Nicklas Pedersen	0	0	0	0	0	0
39	MF	(Denmark) Marcus Nielsen	0	0	0	0	0	0
55	DF	(Croatia) Stipe Radić	19	1	4	0	23	1
Own goals			—	0	—	0	–	0
Players who departed mid-season
2	DF	(Norway) Ivan Näsberg	5	0	0	0	5	0
7	FW	(Cape Verde) Serginho	2	0	0	0	2	0
14	FW	(Denmark) Anosike Ementa	3	1	0	0	3	1
37	MF	(Denmark) Jakob Vester	15	2	5	0	20	2

== Transfers ==
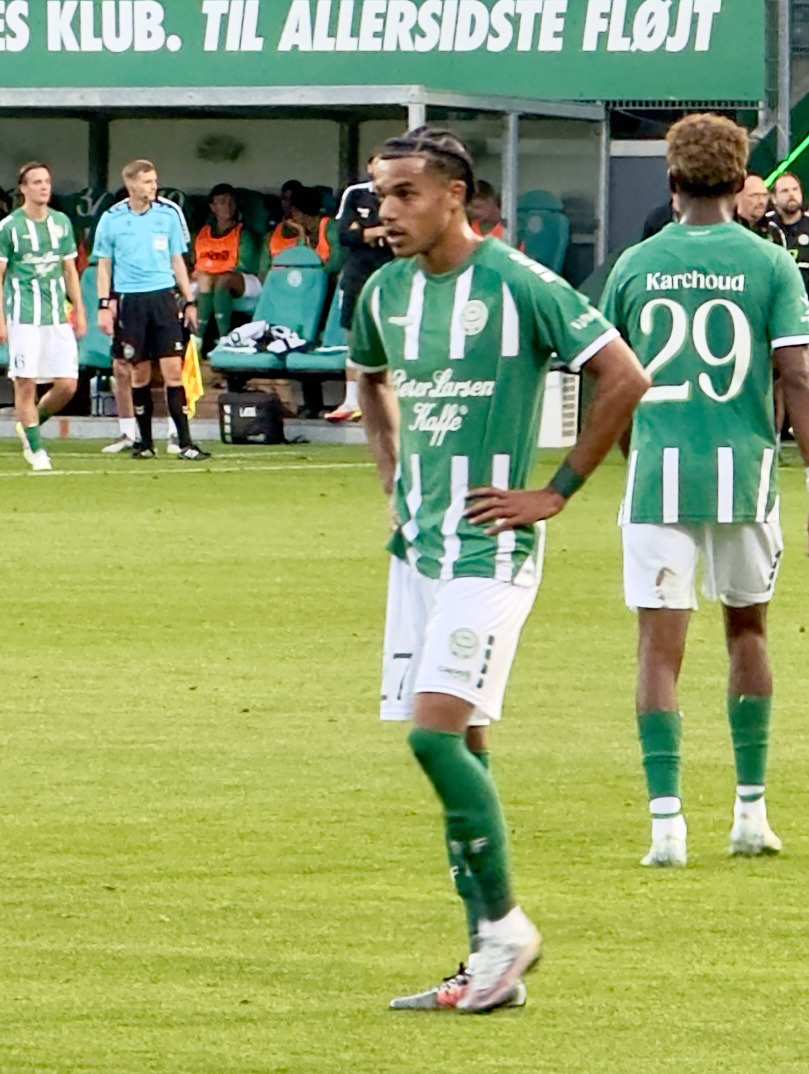
Yonis Njoh joined the club from French club Pau FC, following a loan during the previous season.

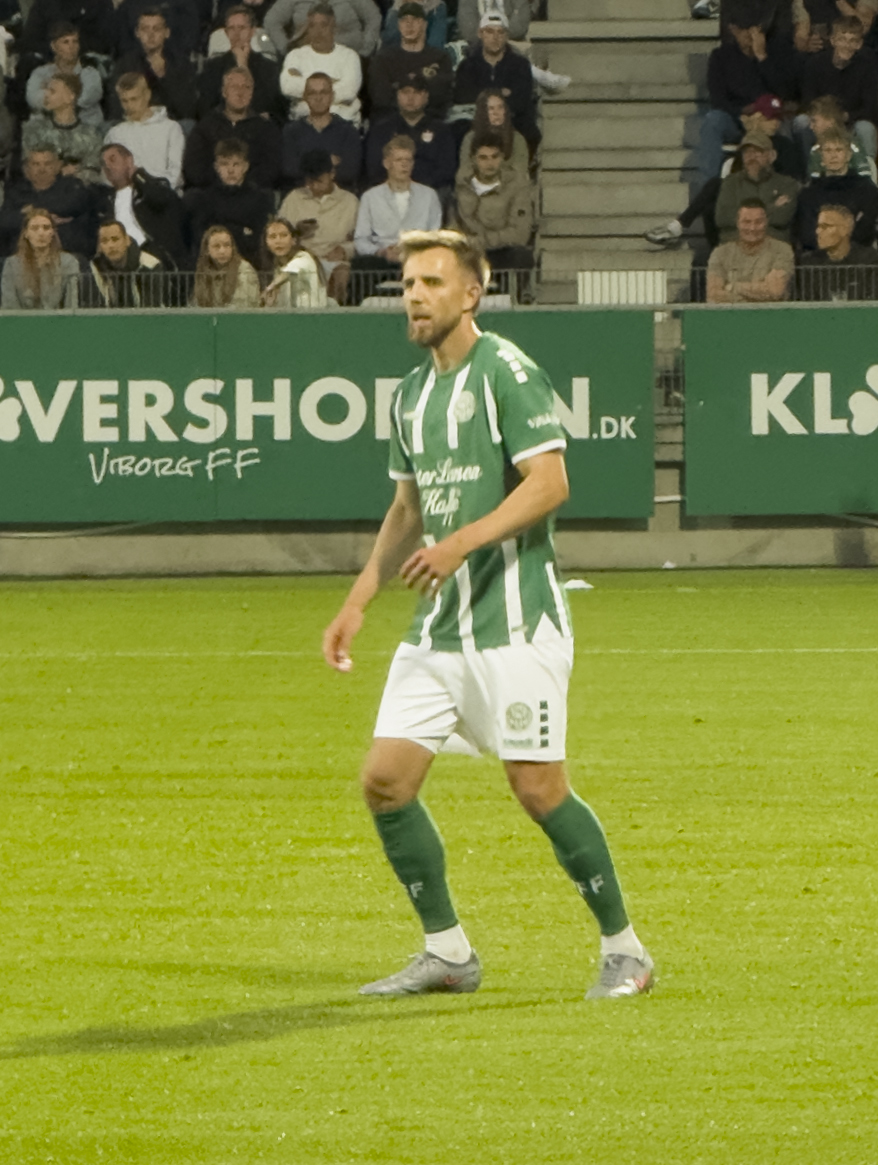
Ivan Näsberg departed Viborg to rejoin Norwegian club Vålerenga one year after joining.

=== In ===
Date	Pos.	Nat.	Name	Club	Fee	Ref.
16 June 2025	FW	(France)	Yonis Njoh	(France) Pau FC	undisclosed (Note: Reported as kr. 1,000,000)	
15 July 2025	FW	(Equatorial Guinea)	Dorian Jr.	(Spain) Marbella	undisclosed	
22 July 2025	FW	(Denmark)	Sami Jalal	(Denmark) Kolding	undisclosed (Note: Reported as kr. 6,000,000)	
24 July 2025	GK	(Montenegro)	Filip Đukić	(Denmark) AC Horsens	undisclosed	
4 August 2025	FW	(Netherlands)	Tim Freriks	(Denmark) Esbjerg fB	undisclosed	
6 August 2025	MF	(Netherlands)	Mees Hoedemakers	(Netherlands) NEC Nijmegen	undisclosed	
1 September 2025	MF	(France)	Bilal Brahimi	(France) Caen	undisclosed	
21 January 2026	FW	(Somalia)	Osman Addo	(Denmark) B.93	undisclosed (Note: Reported as kr. 750,000)	

=== Out ===
Date	Pos.	Nat.	Name	Club	Fee	Ref.
2 July 2025	DF	(Slovenia)	Anel Zulić	(Slovenia) ND Ilirija 1911	free	
8 July 2025	FW	(Brazil)	Renato Júnior	(United Arab Emirates) Al Wasl	undisclosed	
11 July 2025	MF	(Nigeria)	Ibrahim Said	(Scotland) Motherwell	undisclosed (Note: Reported as €115,000 (kr. 990,115))	
14 July 2025	FW	(Portugal)	Paulinho	(Romania) Oțelul Galați	undisclosed	
15 July 2025	FW	(Denmark)	Isak Jensen	(Netherlands) AZ	undisclosed	
23 July 2025	GK	(Denmark)	Oscar Hedvall	(Norway) Vålerenga	undisclosed	
4 August 2025	FW	(Cape Verde)	Serginho	(United Arab Emirates) Al Wasl	undisclosed (Note: Reported as €3,500,000 (kr. 26,120,000))	
7 August 2025	FW	(Denmark)	Anosike Ementa	(Belgium) Zulte Waregem	undisclosed (Note: Reported as €800,000 (kr. 6,000,000))	
8 August 2025	MF	(Netherlands)	Nigel Thomas	(Netherlands) Den Haag	undisclosed	
2 September 2025	DF	(Norway)	Ivan Näsberg	(Norway) Vålerenga	undisclosed	
31 December 2025	MF	(Denmark)	Jakob Vester	(Norway) Sandefjord	undisclosed (Note: Reported as kr. 4,000,000)	

=== Loan in ===
Date	Pos.	Nat.	Name	Club	Duration	Ref.
2 February 2026	MF	(Iceland)	Ísak Andri Sigurgeirsson	(Sweden) Norrköping	30 June 2026	

=== Loan out ===
Date	Pos.	Nat.	Name	Club	Duration	Ref.
12 June 2025	GK	(Denmark)	Kasper Kiilerich	(Denmark) Aarhus Fremad	30 June 2026	
