= 2024–25 Viborg FF season =

Danish football club season

Viborg FF
2024–25 season
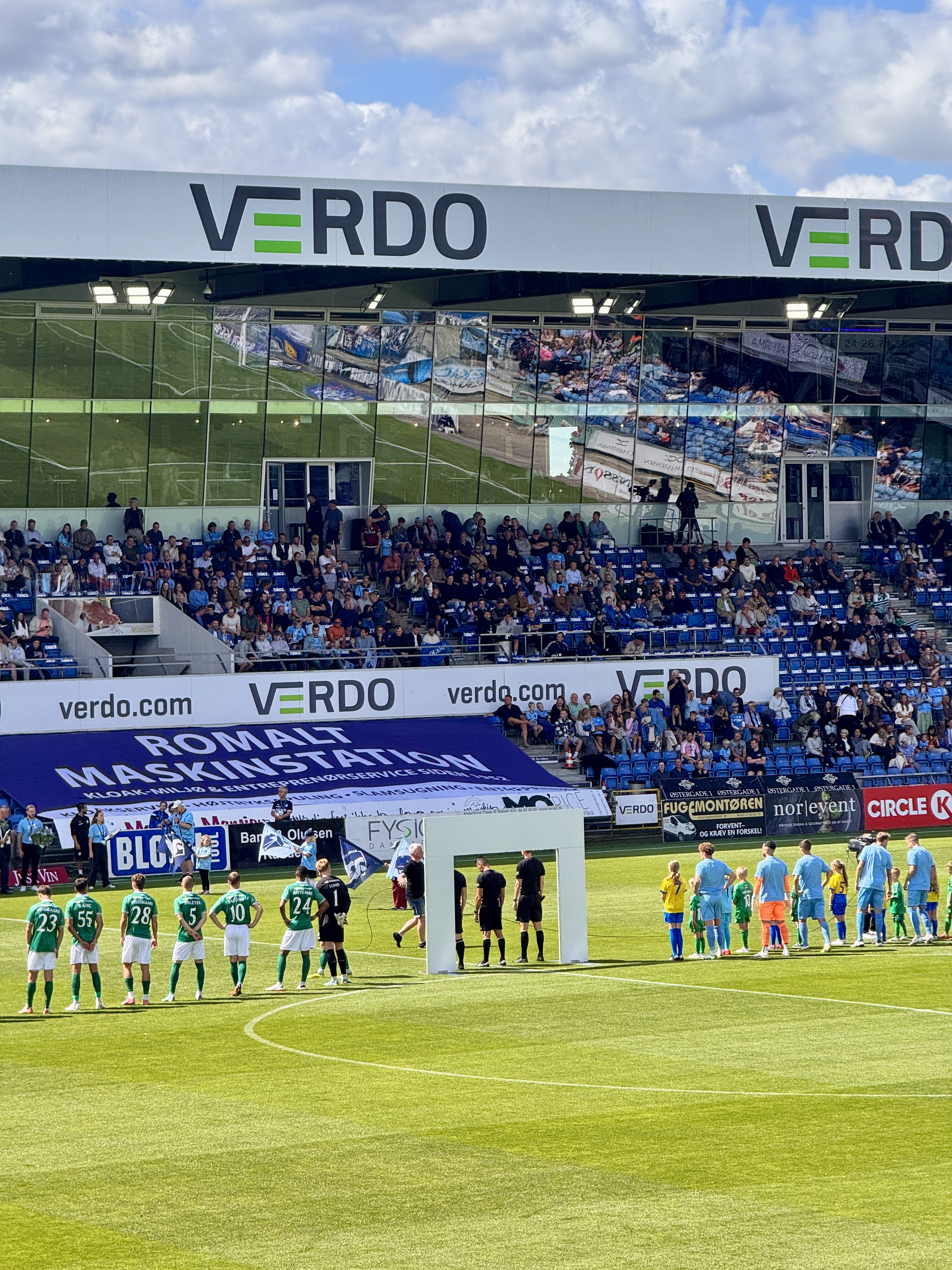
- Pre-match between Viborg and Randers, July 2024
- Managing Director: Morten Jensen
- Head coach: Jakob Poulsen
- Stadium: Energi Viborg Arena
- Danish Superliga: 8th
- Danish Cup: Semi-finals
- Top goalscorer: League: Isak Jensen (9); All: Isak Jensen (11)
- Highest home attendance: 8,513; (vs Midtjylland, 10 November 2024); (vs Copenhagen, 1 May 2025)
- Lowest home attendance: 4,481; (vs Brabrand, 13 December 2024)
- Average home league attendance: 6,461
- Biggest win: 5–0 (15 September 2024 vs. Vejle)
- Biggest defeat: 1–4 (14 February 2025 vs. Brøndby); 1–4 (24 February 2025 vs. Silkeborg)
Home colours	Away colours	Third colours

The 2024–25 season was the 128th season in the history of Viborg FF, and their fourth consecutive year in the Danish Superliga, the top level of football within Denmark. Additionally, the team competed within the Danish Cup, the country's official knockout tournament. This was the first full season under head coach Jakob Poulsen, who took charge midway through the previous season.

== Pre-season and friendlies ==
26 June 2024	Viborg	0–1	FK Haugesund	Viborg
3:00 PM CEST (UTC+2)		Report	Sauer 6'	Stadium: Vildbjerg Sportscenter

3 July 2024	Randers	1–3	Viborg	Randers
1:00 PM CEST (UTC+2)	75' (Themsen)	Report	Serginho 12'; Júnior 14'; Bonde 90+19'

13 July 2024	AaB	1–4	Viborg	Aalborg
1:30 PM CEST (UTC+2)	Ross 17'	Report	Júnior 14', 29'; Ementa 75', 84'	Stadium: Aalborg Kunstgræsbane

18 January 2025	Viborg	2–0	AaB	Viborg
12:00 PM CET (UTC+1)	Løndal 9'; Søndergaard 32'	Report		Stadium: Rughavevej

29 January 2025	Hobro	1–2	Viborg	Aalestrup
1:00 PM CET (UTC+1)	Klitten 25'	Report	Berger 4'; Ementa 35'

9 February 2025	Viborg	2–1	IK Sirius	Spain
2:00 PM CET (UTC+1)	Kirkegaard 76'; Júnior 87'	Report	Walta 47'	Stadium: Campo AGS 1

== Superliga ==
=== Results summary ===
Overall								Home						Away					
Pld	W	D	L	GF	GA	GD	Pts	W	D	L	GF	GA	GD	W	D	L	GF	GA	GD
32	12	11	9	57	50	+7	47	9	3	4	31	25	+6	3	8	5	26	25	+1

Source: FBref

=== Regular season ===
Pos	Team	Pld	W	D	L	GF	GA	GD	Pts	Qualification
6	Brøndby	22	8	9	5	42	32	+10	33	Qualification for the Championship round
7	Silkeborg	22	8	9	5	38	29	+9	33	Qualification for the Relegation round
8	Viborg	22	7	7	8	38	39	−1	28	Qualification for the Relegation round
9	AaB	22	5	6	11	23	41	−18	21	Qualification for the Relegation round
10	Lyngby	22	3	9	10	15	26	−11	18	Qualification for the Relegation round

Source: Danish Football Association (in Danish), Soccerway
Rules for classification: 1) Points; 2) Goal difference; 3) Goals scored; 4) Away goals scored; 5) Play-off (played on neutral ground if determining teams for different rounds); 6) Draw.

==== Results by round ====
Matchday	1	2	3	4	5	6	7	8	9	10	11	12	13	14	15	16	17	18	19	20	21	22
Ground	H	A	A	H	A	H	A	A	H	A	H	A	H	A	H	A	H	A	H	H	A	H
Result	D	L	L	L	D	W	D	W	W	L	D	D	W	L	W	D	L	L	L	W	D	W
Position	6	10	9	10	10	9	8	8	7	8	8	8	8	8	8	8	8	8	8	8	8	8

Source: http://www.superliga.dk/
A = Away; H = Home; W = Win; D = Draw; L = Loss

=== Relegation round ===
Pos	Team	Pld	W	D	L	GF	GA	GD	Pts	
1	Silkeborg (O)	32	13	10	9	56	41	+15	49	Qualification for the European play-off match
2	Viborg	32	12	11	9	57	50	+7	47	
3	Sønderjyske	32	10	7	15	47	64	−17	37	
4	Vejle	32	7	7	18	37	64	−27	28	
5	Lyngby (R)	32	5	12	15	26	43	−17	27	Relegation to 1st Division

Source: Danish Football Association (in Danish), Soccerway
Rules for classification: 1) Points; 2) Goal difference; 3) Goals scored; 4) Away goals scored; 5) Play-off (played on neutral ground if determining teams for different rounds); 6) Draw.
(O) Play-off winners; (R) Relegated

==== Results by round ====
Matchday	1	2	3	4	5	6	7	8	9	10
Ground	A	H	H	A	H	A	A	H	H	A
Result	W	W	W	D	D	D	D	W	L	W
Position	8	8	7	8	8	8	8	8	8	8

Source: http://www.superliga.dk/
A = Away; H = Home; W = Win; D = Draw; L = Loss

=== Results ===
21 July 2024 1	Viborg	3–3	Brøndby	Viborg
6:00 PM CEST (UTC+2)	Vester 11', 33'; Jensen 90+6'	Report	Bischoff 30'; Yeboah 90+2', 90+8'	Stadium: Energi Viborg Arena; Attendance: 7,658; Referee: Lasse Læbel Graagaard

28 July 2024 2	Randers	3–1	Viborg	Randers
2:00 PM CEST (UTC+2)	Danho 27'; Campbell 45+4'; Toure 75'	Report	Grønning 39'	Stadium: Cepheus Park Randers; Attendance: 5,695; Referee: Sandi Putros

4 August 2024 3	Silkeborg	3–2	Viborg	Silkeborg
12:00 PM CEST (UTC+2)	Pyndt 9'; Bakiz 12'; Rödin 40'	Report	Anyembe 47'; Grønning 52' (pen.)	Stadium: JYSK park Attendance: 4,712; Referee: Aydin Uslu

12 August 2024 4	Viborg	2–3	AaB	Viborg
13:00 PM CEST (UTC+2)	Jensen 14'; Vester 45+8'	Report	Ross 35'; Jasson 39'; Jørgensen 56'	Stadium: Energi Viborg Arena; Attendance: 6,852; Referee: Mads-Kristoffer Kristoffersen

18 August 2024 5	Copenhagen	1–1	Viborg	Copenhagen
6:00 PM CEST (UTC+2)	Óskarsson 83'	Report	Vester 58'	Stadium: Parken; Attendance: 26,035; Referee: Sandi Putros

26 August 2024 6	Viborg	1–0	Lyngby	Viborg
7:00 PM CEST (UTC+2)	Bürgy 57'	Report		Stadium: Energi Viborg Arena; Attendance: 5,816; Referee: Jakob Kehlet

1 September 2024 7	Sønderjyske	2–2	Viborg	Haderslev
2:00 PM CEST (UTC+2)	Qamili 34'; Ingason 36'	Report	Kuzmić 52'; Serginho 72'	Stadium: Sydbank Park; Attendance: 4,879; Referee: Jakob Sundberg

15 September 2024 8	Vejle	0–5	Viborg	Vejle
4:00 PM CEST (UTC+2)		Report	Grønning 46'; Serginho 55'; Jensen 65'; Ementa 68', 84'	Stadium: Vejle Stadion; Attendance: 5,496; Referee: Jens Grabski Maae

20 September 2024 9	Viborg	3–2	Nordsjælland	Viborg
7:00 PM CEST (UTC+2)	Radić 28'; Júnior 39'; Jensen 46'	Report	Egeli 15'; Hey 86'	Stadium: Energi Viborg Arena; Attendance: 6,290; Referee: Sandi Putros

29 September 2024 10	Midtjylland	3–1	Viborg	Herning
4:00 PM CEST (UTC+2)	Simsir 39'; Andersson 71'; Djú 73'	Report	Westergaard 24'	Stadium: MCH Arena; Attendance: 11,355; Referee: Lasse Graagaard

6 October 2024 11	Viborg	1–1	AGF	Viborg
4:00 PM CEST (UTC+2)	Westergaard 26'	Report	Bech 68'	Stadium: Energi Viborg Arena; Attendance: 8,351; Referee: Mikkel Redder

20 October 2024 12	Lyngby	0–0	Viborg	Lyngby
2:00 PM CEST (UTC+2)		Report		Stadium: Lyngby Stadium; Attendance: 4,425; Referee: Jakob Kehlet

27 October 2024 13	Viborg	4–2	Sønderjyske	Viborg
5:00 PM CET (UTC+1)	Mbom 4'; Jørgensen 43'; Jensen 70' (pen.); Nouck 82'	Report	Qamili 58' (pen.); Lyng 75'	Stadium: Energi Viborg Arena; Attendance: 6,227; Referee: Aydin Uslu

3 November 2024 14	Nordsjælland	2–1	Viborg	Farum
2:00 PM CET (UTC+1)	Ankersen 6'; Bundgaard 44' (o.g.)	Report	Bundgaard 50'	Stadium: Right to Dream Park; Attendance: 3,413; Referee: Morten Krogh

10 November 2024 15	Viborg	1–0	Midtjylland	Viborg
4:00 PM CET (UTC+1)	Näsberg 39'	Report		Stadium: Energi Viborg Arena; Attendance: 8,513; Referee: Sandi Putros

24 November 2024 16	AaB	0–0	Viborg	Aalborg
2:00 PM CET (UTC+1)		Report		Stadium: Aalborg Portland Park; Attendance: 7,659; Referee: Jacob Karlsen

1 December 2024 17	Viborg	1–2	Randers	Viborg
2:00 PM CET (UTC+1)	Nouck 90+1'	Report	Greve 45'; Toure 63'	Stadium: Energi Viborg Arena; Attendance: 5,681; Referee: Jens Grabski Maae

14 February 2025 18	Brøndby	4–1	Viborg	Brøndby
7:00 PM CET (UTC+1)	Kvistgaarden 3'; Anyembe 46' (o.g.); Suzuki 64'; Rajović 82' (pen.)	Report	Näsberg 27'	Stadium: Brøndby Stadium; Attendance: 24,067; Referee: Sandi Putros

24 February 2025 19	Viborg	1–4	Silkeborg	Viborg
7:00 PM CET (UTC+1)	Näsberg 5'	Report	Larsen 30'; Bakiz 37'; Andersson 83' (o.g.); McCowatt 86'	Stadium: Energi Viborg Arena; Attendance: 5,208; Referee: Michael Tykgaard

2 March 2025 20	Viborg	3–1	Vejle	Viborg
12:00 PM CET (UTC+1)	Júnior 14'; Lonwijk 32'; Njoh 44'	Report	Onugkha 52'	Stadium: Energi Viborg Arena; Attendance: 5,346; Referee: Mikkel Redder

9 March 2025 21	AGF	1–1	Viborg	Risskov
4:00 PM CET (UTC+1)	Anderson 77'	Report	Tingager 53' (o.g.)	Stadium: Vejlby Stadium; Attendance: 8,777; Referee: Jørgen Daugbjerg Burchardt

16 March 2025 22	Viborg	3–2	Copenhagen	Viborg
5:00 PM CET (UTC+1)	Serginho 48'; Radić 60'; Damkjer 66'	Report	Gocholeishvili 26'; Larsson 41'	Stadium: Energi Viborg Arena; Attendance: 7,750; Referee: Jakob Kehlet

28 March 2025 23	AaB	0–4	Viborg	Aalborg
7:00 PM CEST (UTC+2)		Report	Jørgensen 21'; Serginho 41'; Njoh 64'; Nouck 90+5'	Stadium: Aalborg Portland Park; Attendance: 7,036; Referee: Morten Krogh

6 April 2025 24	Viborg	2–1	Sønderjyske	Viborg
2:00 PM CEST (UTC+2)	Njoh 18'; Júnior 63'	Report	Grønning 13' (o.g.)	Stadium: Energi Viborg Arena; Attendance: 6,265; Referee: Sandi Putros

13 April 2025 25	Viborg	2–1	Silkeborg	Viborg
7:00 PM CEST (UTC+2)	Jensen 74', 89'	Report	Rödin 25'	Stadium: Energi Viborg Arena; Attendance: 6,002; Referee: Mikkel Redder

17 April 2025 26	Vejle	3–3	Viborg	Vejle
2:00 PM CEST (UTC+2)	Velkov 22'; Onugkha 55', 60'	Report	Damkjer 27'; Jensen 39'; Júnior 85'	Stadium: Vejle Stadion; Attendance: 6,203; Referee: Jonas Hansen

21 April 2025 27	Viborg	1–1	Lyngby	Viborg
2:00 PM CEST (UTC+2)	Serginho 17'	Report	Gytkjær 75'	Stadium: Energi Viborg Arena; Attendance: 5,536; Referee: Mads-Kristoffer Kristoffersen

27 April 2025 28	Sønderjyske	2–2	Viborg	Haderslev
2:00 PM CEST (UTC+2)	Näsberg 3' (o.g.); Hyseni 11'	Report	Njoh 73', 83'	Stadium: Sydbank Park; Attendance: 5,823; Referee: Jens Grabski Maae

4 May 2025 29	Lyngby	0–0	Viborg	Lyngby
2:00 PM CEST (UTC+2)		Report		Stadium: Lyngby Stadium; Attendance: 5,529; Referee: Jørgen Daugbjerg Burchardt

11 May 2025 30	Viborg	3–1	AaB	Viborg
6:00 PM CEST (UTC+2)	Kramer 53' (o.g.); Jørgensen 75'; Radić 82'	Report	Helenius 65'	Stadium: Energi Viborg Arena; Referee: Jonas Hansen

18 May 2025 31	Viborg	0–1	Vejle	Viborg
2:00 PM CEST (UTC+2)		Report	Velkov 45+2'	Stadium: Energi Viborg Arena; Attendance: 6,136; Referee: Aydin Uslu

24 May 2025 32	Silkeborg	1–2	Viborg	Silkeborg
3:00 PM CEST (UTC+2)	Carlsen 19'	Report	Njoh 23'; Jensen 30' (pen.)	Stadium: JYSK park Attendance: 4,838; Referee: Jørgen Daugbjerg Burchardt

== Danish Cup ==
=== Early rounds ===
4 September 2024 Second Round	AC Horsens	0–4	Viborg	Horsens
12:00 PM CEST (UTC+2)		Report	Radić 22'; Júnior 41'; Westergaard 77'; Serginho 89'	Stadium: Nordstern Arena Horsens; Attendance: 2,031; Referee: Aydin Uslu

25 September 2024 Third Round	Middelfart	2–2 (a.e.t.) (4–6 p)	Viborg	Middelfart
4:00 PM CEST (UTC+2)		Report	Westergaard 61'; Jensen 109'	Stadium: Middelfart Stadium; Attendance: 1,767; Referee: Mads-Kristoffer Kristoffersen

31 October 2024 Fourth Round	Næsby	1–4	Viborg	Odense
5:00 PM CEST (UTC+2)	Dauerhöj 90+2'		Nouck 19'; Grønning 41'; Kirkegaard 43'; Júnior 88'	Stadium: ALPI Arena; Attendance: 1,337; Referee: Michael Tykgaard

=== Quarter-finals ===
8 December 2024 Quarter-final first leg	Brabrand	1–1	Viborg	Brabrand
1:00 PM CET (UTC+1)	Berwald 31'	Report	Horneman 38'	Stadium: Brabrand Stadion; Attendance: 2,900; Referee: Aydin Uslu

13 December 2024 Quarter-final second leg	Viborg	6–0 (7–1 agg.)	Brabrand	Viborg
7:00 PM CET (UTC+1)	Westergaard 25'; Bürgy 30'; Jensen 50'; Damkjer 57'; Berger 68'; Ementa 86'	Report		Stadium: Energi Viborg Arena; Attendance: 4,481; Referee: Jacob Karlsen

=== Semi-finals ===
1 May 2025 Semi-final first leg	Viborg	0–1	Copenhagen	Viborg
7:30 PM CEST (UTC+2)		Report	Larsson 58'	Stadium: Energi Viborg Arena; Attendance: 8,513; Referee: Sandi Putros

8 May 2025 Semi-final second leg	Copenhagen	1–0 (2–0 agg.)	Viborg	Copenhagen
7:00 PM CEST (UTC+2)	Lerager 32'	Report		Stadium: Parken; Attendance: 26,441; Referee: Morten Krogh

== Squad statistics ==
As of final match played on 24 May 2025

No.	Pos	Player	Superliga		Danish Cup		Total	
No.	Pos	Player	Apps	Goals	Apps	Goals	Apps	Goals
1	GK	(Denmark) Lucas Lund	18	0	7	0	25	0
2	DF	(Norway) Ivan Näsberg	14	3	3	0	17	3
3	DF	(Sweden) Elias Andersson	6	0	0	0	6	0
5	DF	(Slovenia) Žan Zaletel	5	0	0	0	5	0
6	MF	(Denmark) Mads Søndergaard	14	0	6	0	20	0
7	FW	(Cape Verde) Serginho	24	5	5	1	29	6
8	FW	(Nigeria) Ibrahim Said	14	0	2	0	16	0
10	FW	(Denmark) Isak Jensen	27	9	6	2	33	11
11	FW	(Brazil) Renato Júnior	29	4	5	2	34	6
12	MF	(Denmark) Thomas Jørgensen	27	3	5	0	32	3
13	MF	(Denmark) Jeppe Grønning	26	3	3	1	29	4
14	FW	(Denmark) Anosike Ementa	30	3	7	1	37	4
15	MF	(Denmark) Asker Beck	11	0	2	0	13	0
16	GK	(Denmark) Oscar Hedvall	14	0	0	0	14	0
17	FW	(Denmark) Charly Nouck	26	2	5	2	31	4
18	MF	(Germany) Jean-Manuel Mbom	29	1	6	0	35	1
19	MF	(Suriname) Justin Lonwijk	20	1	6	0	26	1
20	GK	(Denmark) Kasper Kiilerich	0	0	0	0	0	0
23	DF	(Denmark) Oliver Bundgaard	9	1	2	0	11	1
24	DF	(Kenya) Daniel Anyembe	30	1	4	0	34	1
26	DF	(Denmark) Hjalte Bidstrup	7	0	0	0	7	0
27	FW	(France) Yonis Njoh	14	6	2	0	16	6
30	DF	(Slovenia) Srđan Kuzmić	21	1	4	0	25	1
31	MF	(Denmark) Carl Christensen	0	0	0	0	0	0
31	DF	(Denmark) Mikkel Løndal	2	0	1	0	3	0
32	DF	(Denmark) Lukas Kirkegaard	2	0	5	1	7	1
33	MF	(Denmark) Frederik Damkjer	5	1	1	1	6	2
34	DF	(Denmark) Carl Nygaard	0	0	0	0	0	0
37	MF	(Denmark) Jakob Vester	25	4	7	0	32	4
55	DF	(Croatia) Stipe Radić	20	3	7	1	27	4
Own goals			—	5	—	0	–	5
Players who departed mid-season
4	DF	(Switzerland) Nicolas Bürgy	13	1	3	1	16	2
21	MF	(Denmark) Sofus Berger	3	0	2	1	5	1
28	MF	(Denmark) Magnus Westergaard	15	2	5	3	20	5

== Transfers ==
=== In ===
Date	Pos.	Nat.	Name	Club	Fee	Ref.
8 June 2024	MF	(Denmark)	Isak Jensen	(United States) St. Louis City SC	undisclosed	
18 June 2024	GK	(Denmark)	Oscar Hedvall	(Denmark) Midtjylland	undisclosed	
15 July 2024	MF	(Denmark)	Charly Nouck	(Denmark) OB	€536K	
22 August 2024	MF	(Denmark)	Thomas Jørgensen	(Denmark) Copenhagen	€600k	
2 September 2024	DF	(Norway)	Ivan Näsberg	(Greece) PAOK	free	
31 January 2025	MF	(Denmark)	Asker Beck	(Denmark) Kolding	€150k	
3 February 2025	DF	(Denmark)	Hjalte Bidstrup	(Denmark) Copenhagen	€135k	

=== Out ===
Date	Pos.	Nat.	Name	Club	Fee	Ref.
3 July 2024	MF	(Czech Republic)	Jan Žambůrek	(Netherlands) Heracles	€402k	
15 July 2024	MF	(Denmark)	Jakob Bonde	(Denmark) OB	€670k	
16 July 2024	FW	(Sweden)	Marokhy Ndione	released		
2 September 2024	DF	(Faroe Islands)	Martin Agnarsson	(Denmark) Aarhus Fremad	undisclosed	
2 September 2024	MF	(Netherlands)	Jamie Jacobs	(Netherlands) Volendam	undisclosed	
16 January 2025	MF	(Denmark)	Magnus Westergaard	(England) Wycombe Wanderers	€945k	
1 February 2025	MF	(Denmark)	Sofus Berger	(Denmark) Silkeborg	€300k	
3 February 2025	DF	(Switzerland)	Nicolas Bürgy	(Denmark) OB	undisclosed	

=== Loan in ===
Date	Pos.	Nat.	Name	Club	Duration	Ref.
31 August 2024	MF	(Suriname)	Justin Lonwijk	(Ukraine) Dynamo Kyiv	30 June 2025	
21 January 2025	DF	(Sweden)	Elias Andersson	(Poland) Lech Poznań	30 June 2025	
3 February 2025	FW	(France)	Yonis Njoh	(France) Pau	30 June 2025	

=== Loan out ===
Date	Pos.	Nat.	Name	Club	Duration	Ref.
1 July 2024	FW	(Portugal)	Paulinho	(Turkey) Bandırmaspor	30 June 2025	
19 July 2024	DF	(Denmark)	Viktor Hjorth	(Denmark) Skive	31 December 2024	
23 July 2024	MF	(Netherlands)	Nigel Thomas	(Portugal) Nacional	30 June 2025 (Note: Loan was terminated mid-season.)	
21 August 2024	DF	(Slovenia)	Anel Zulić	(Slovenia) NŠ Mura	30 June 2025 (Note: Loan was terminated mid-season.)	
6 January 2025	DF	(Slovenia)	Anel Zulić	(Slovenia) Koper	30 June 2025	
6 January 2025	GK	(Denmark)	Kasper Kiilerich	(Denmark) Aarhus Fremad	30 June 2025	
23 January 2025	MF	(Netherlands)	Nigel Thomas	(Portugal) Académico de Viseu	30 June 2025	
