= Njoh =

Njoh is a Cameroonian surname. Notable people with the surname include:

- Alain Njoh Njoh Mpondo (born 1985), Cameroonian footballer
- Lilian Njoh (born 2001), Cameroonian footballer
- Richard Emmanuel Njoh (born 1995), Cameroonian footballer
- Yonis Njoh (born 2004), French footballer
