= Thomas Jørgensen (disambiguation) =

Thomas Jørgensen may refer to:

- Thomas Jørgensen (speedway rider) (born 1982), Danish motorcycle speedway rider
- Thomas Jørgensen (born 2005), Danish footballer
