= Mikkel Løndal =

Danish footballer (born 2006)

Personal information
- Full name: Mikkel Bach Løndal
- Date of birth: 31 May 2006 (age 20)
- Place of birth: Skive, Denmark
- Height: 1.77 m (5 ft 10 in)
- Positions: Right-back; right winger

Team information
- Current team: Hobro

Youth career
- Skive IK
- FC Salling
- 2023–2025: Viborg

Senior career*
Years	Team	Apps	(Gls)
2025–2026	Viborg	3	(0)
2026–	Hobro	5	(0)

International career^{‡}
2025	Denmark U19	1	(0)
- * Club domestic league appearances and goals as of 10:46, 1 September 2026 (UTC) ‡ National team caps and goals as of 14 May 2025

Mikkel Bach Løndal (born 31 May 2006) is a Danish professional footballer who plays as a right-back for Danish 1st Division club Hobro.

== Club career ==
=== Viborg ===
Løndal came through the youth ranks at Skive IK and later FC Salling, before joining Viborg as a U15 player. Joining Viborg in December 2023, he signed a contract through to the summer of 2026. Here, he worked his way up through the club's youth academy. On 13 December 2024, 18-year old Løndal made his first-team debut for Viborg in the second-leg of a Danish Cup quarter-final tie against Brabrand IF. Coming on in the 73rd minute to replace Nicolas Bürgy, Viborg went on to win the match by a score of 6–0 to advance to the semi-final. His league did not occur until 6 April 2025 in a 2–1 victory over Sønderjyske, when he again made a substitute appearance, coming on in the 62nd minute to replace Elias Andersson.

On 10 June 2025, Viborg announced that Løndal had extended his contract, signing a new deal until the summer of 2028. With the move, he was also promoted to a member of the first team squad ahead of the 2025–26 Danish Superliga season. The club reaffirmed this in a later announcement on 16 July, stating that he would play the upcoming season wearing the number 31.

=== Hobro ===
On 12 June 2026, Løndal was sold to Danish 1st Division club Hobro where he signed a three-year contract. Viborg reportedly retained a high resale clause in the deal, if Løndal is sold in the future.

== International career ==
Løndal made his debut for the Denmark under-19 team on 14 May 2025, appearing in a 1–1 draw against Germany. He appeared as a substitute in the match, coming on in the 46th minute.

== Career statistics ==
As of match played 30 August 2026

Appearances and goals by club, season and competition
Club	Season	League			Cup (Note: Includes Danish Cup)		Other		Total	
Club	Season	Division	Apps	Goals	Apps	Goals	Apps	Goals	Apps	Goals
Viborg	2024–25	Danish Superliga	2	0	1	0	—		3	0
Viborg	2025–26	Danish Superliga	1	0	2	0	—		3	0
Viborg	Total		3	0	3	0	0	0	6	0
Hobro	2026–27	Danish 1st Division	5	0	1	2	—		6	2
Career total			8	0	4	2	0	0	12	2
