= Lukas Kirkegaard =

Danish footballer (born 2005)

- Kirkegaard in 2026

Personal information
- Full name: Lukas Emil Kirkegaard
- Date of birth: 31 August 2005 (age 21)
- Place of birth: Viborg, Denmark
- Height: 1.92 m (6 ft 4 in)
- Position: Centre-back

Team information
- Current team: Viborg
- Number: 4

Youth career
- Viborg

Senior career*
Years	Team	Apps	(Gls)
2024–	Viborg	29	(2)

International career^{‡}
2026–	Denmark U21	1	(0)
- * Club domestic league appearances and goals as of 21:24, 25 October 2026 (UTC) ‡ National team caps and goals as of 01:48, 2 April 2026 (UTC)

Lukas Emil Kirkegaard (born 31 August 2005) is a Danish professional footballer who plays as a centre-back for Danish Superliga club Viborg. He has also made an appearance for the Denmark national under-21 football team.

== Career ==
Kirkegaard is a product of Viborg, where he spent his entire youth career. After several years within the Viborg youth system, he became regularly involved with Viborg's first team during the 2023–24 Danish Superliga season. Though he was frequently on the bench during league matches, he did not see any playing time. In December 2023, he agreed to and signed a new contract with the club, which saw his contract extended until June 2025. At the same time, it was announced that he would be permanently promoted to the first-team squad beginning in the 2024–25 season.

On 4 September 2024, Kirkegaard made his debut, coming on in the 75th minute to replace Thomas Jørgensen in a Danish Cup match against AC Horsens. A few days later, on 16 September 2024, Kirkegaard extended his contract with Viborg until June 2028. In a Danish Cup match against Næsby Boldklub, Kirkegaard scored his first professional goal in a 4–1 win in the fourth round.

On 28 March 2025, Kirkegaard made his Danish Superliga debut, coming on in the 88th minute to replace Daniel Anyembe in the 4–0 victory over AaB. His first Superliga goal for the club came on 12 April 2026 when he scored the first goal in a 2–0 win over Sønderjyske. Ahead of Viborg's 2026–27 season, it was announced he signed a new contract with the club until 2030.

== International ==
Kirkegaard made his international for Denmark U21 on 31 March 2026, in a 4–0 win over Wales U21.

== Career statistics ==
As of match played 25 October 2026

Appearances and goals by club, season and competition
Club	Season	League			Cup (Note: Includes appearances in the Danish Cup)		Other		Total	
Club	Season	Division	Apps	Goals	Apps	Goals	Apps	Goals	Apps	Goals
Viborg	2024–25	Danish Superliga	2	0	5	1	—		7	1
Viborg	2025–26	Danish Superliga	15	2	7	0	—		22	2
Viborg	2026–27	Danish Superliga	12	0	1	0	—		13	0
Career total			29	2	13	1	0	0	42	3
