= Sami Jalal =

Danish footballer (born 2004)

Personal information
- Full name: Sami Jalal Karchoud
- Date of birth: 8 August 2004 (age 22)
- Place of birth: Frederiksberg, Denmark
- Position: Winger

Team information
- Current team: Viborg
- Number: 10

Youth career
- –2019: B.93
- 2019–2024: FA 2000

Senior career*
Years	Team	Apps	(Gls)
2022–2024	FA 2000		
2024–2025	Kolding	31	(2)
2025–	Viborg	42	(2)

International career^{‡}
2025	Denmark U20	1	(0)
- * Club domestic league appearances and goals as of 21:39, 25 October 2026 (UTC) ‡ National team caps and goals as of 4 June 2025

Sami Jalal Karchoud (born 8 August 2004) is a Danish footballer who plays as a winger for Viborg in the Danish Superliga. He has also made an appearance for the Denmark national under-20 football team.

== Career ==
Jalal's youth career began at B.93 before moving to FA 2000 in 2019. After several years in the club's youth teams, he signed his first professional contract with Danish 3rd Division club FA 2000 on 19 April 2023 at 18 years old. A year later, on 29 April 2024, he was sold for a reported fee of 150,000 kr. to Kolding. In his one season at the club, he appeared in 36 matches, scoring twice and assisting in an additional five goals.

On 22 July 2025, Jalal made his move to the top flight of Danish football when he was signed by Superliga club Viborg for a reported 6,000,000 kr. fee. He signed with the club on a five-year contract, valid until 2030. He made his debut for the club on 27 July in a 3–1 loss to OB, starting the game before he was substituted off in the 59th minute. Jalal was named as Danish Superliga Player of the Month for March 2026, receiving the award on 6 April.

Early in Viborg's 2026–27 season, Jalal signed a new contract with the club on a five-year contract.

== International career ==
In May 2025, Jalal was called up to the Denmark national under-20 football team, making an appearance in a 3–3 draw versus Mexico in the Maurice Revello Tournament on 4 June. He was replaced after one appearance for the remainder of the tournament by Gustav Fraulo.

Jalal was called up to the Denmark U21 team in March 2026, replacing Viborg teammate Charly Nouck.

== Personal life ==
Jalal is eligible to represent Denmark, Morocco, or Tunisia.

== Career statistics ==
As of match played 25 October 2026

Appearances and goals by club, season and competition
Club	Season	League			Cup (Note: Includes Danish Cup)		Other		Total	
Club	Season	Division	Apps	Goals	Apps	Goals	Apps	Goals	Apps	Goals
FA 2000	2022–23	Danish 3rd Division	0	0	2	1	—		2	1
FA 2000	2023–24	Danish 2nd Division	0	0	2	1	—		2	1
FA 2000	Total		0	0	4	2	0	0	4	2
Kolding	2024–25	Danish 1st Division	31	2	5	0	—		36	2
Viborg	2025–26	Danish Superliga	31	2	5	0	—		36	2
Viborg	2026–27	Danish Superliga	11	0	1	0	—		12	0
Viborg	Total		42	2	5	0	0	0	48	2
Career total			73	4	14	2	0	0	89	4

== Honours ==
- Danish Superliga Player of the Month: March 2026
