= Frederik Damkjer =

Danish footballer (born 2007)

Personal information
- Full name: Frederik Damkjer
- Date of birth: 31 July 2007 (age 19)
- Place of birth: Viborg, Denmark
- Position: Midfielder

Team information
- Current team: Viborg
- Number: 33

Youth career
- NUGF Viborg
- Søndermarken IK
- Viborg

Senior career*
Years	Team	Apps	(Gls)
2024–	Viborg	16	(1)

International career^{‡}
2025	Denmark U-18	2	(0)
2025–	Denmark U-19	2	(0)
- * Club domestic league appearances and goals as of 22:07, 25 October 2026 (UTC) ‡ National team caps and goals as of 22:28, 6 December 2025 (UTC)

Frederik Damkjer (born 31 July 2007) is a Danish professional footballer who plays as a midfielder for Danish Superliga club Viborg.

== Club career ==
Damkjer started at NUGF Viborg where he played from U6 to U10, and later played U11-U12 at Søndermarken IK before moving to FK Viborg as a U13 player. Here he worked his way up through the club's youth academy and was already a regular in the club's U-19 team at the age of 16.

Damkjer was selected for the Viborg's first-team squad for the first time as a 16-year-old in October 2023 against Brøndy, and was also on the bench for another five matches that same season, though without making his debut. In June 2024, Damkjer signed a new deal until June 2027, and the club also announced that from the start of the 2025–26 season, he would be promoted to the first team squad.

Damkjer made his debut for Viborg's first-team squad on 13 December 2024, being substituted onto the pitch in the 39th minute in place of teammate Mads Søndergaard, in a Danish Cup match against Danish 3rd Division club Brabrand. He later scored in the 57th minute and was named as Man of the Match. His Superliga debut later came against AGF on 9 March 2025, playing for 65 minutes of the match.

On 31 July 2025, Damkjer extended his contract with the club until June 2029.

== International career ==
In March 2025, Damkjer was selected for the Denmark national under-18 football team's friendly matches against Netherlands and Wales. He made his debut against the Netherlands on 20 March 2025, playing for 61 minutes before he was substituted off.

== Career statistics ==
As of match played 25 October 2026

Appearances and goals by club, season and competition
Club	Season	League			Cup		Other		Total	
Club	Season	Division	Apps	Goals	Apps	Goals	Apps	Goals	Apps	Goals
Viborg	2023–24	Danish Superliga	0	0	0	0	—		0	0
Viborg	2024–25	Danish Superliga	5	1	1	1	—		6	1
Viborg	2025–26	Danish Superliga	7	0	3	2	—		10	2
Viborg	2026–27	Danish Superliga	4	0	0	0	—		4	0
Career total			16	1	4	3	0	0	20	4
