= Hjalte Bidstrup =

Danish footballer (born 2006)

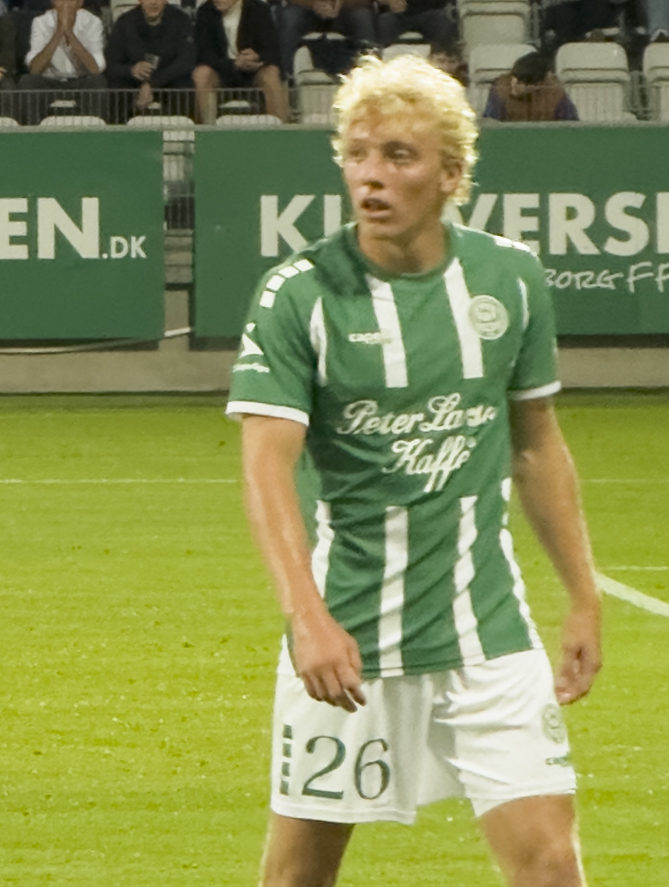
- Bidstrup in 2025

Personal information
- Date of birth: 15 February 2006 (age 20)
- Height: 1.78 m (5 ft 10 in)
- Position: Defender

Team information
- Current team: Viborg
- Number: 26

Youth career
- 2015–2017: HB Køge
- 2017–2025: Copenhagen

Senior career*
Years	Team	Apps	(Gls)
2024–2025	Copenhagen	0	(0)
2025–	Viborg	42	(1)

International career^{‡}
2022–2023	Denmark U17	9	(2)
2023–2024	Denmark U18	7	(0)
2024–2025	Denmark U19	17	(0)
2025–	Denmark U21	1	(0)
- * Club domestic league appearances and goals as of 21:56, 25 October 2026 (UTC) ‡ National team caps and goals as of 01:25, 4 February 2026 (UTC)

Hjalte Bidstrup (born 15 February 2006) is a Danish footballer who currently plays for Viborg in the Danish Superliga.

== Club career ==
Bidstrup moved from HB Køge at the age of 12 to join Copenhagen. He spent more than seven years in the club's youth academy, making eight appearances during the youth team's 2023–24 UEFA Youth League campaign, where he scored one goal in a 6–0 win over Galatasaray on 12 December 2023. During Copenhagen's 2024–25 season, he made three match-day squad lists for the first team, though he was an unused substitution in each of those occasions.

On 3 February 2025, it was announced that Bidstrup had moved to Viborg, citing his desire for first-team football. He agreed with the club to a contract through to the summer of 2029, which included a clause in which Copenhagen may match future transfer offers. He made his debut for the club on 2 March, coming on as a substitute in a 3–1 league victory over Vejle. During the team's 2025–26 season, he was moved to left-back as teammate Jean-Manuel Mbom frequently played as right-back. On 1 March 2026, he scored his first goal for Viborg in a 2–1 win over FC Nordsjælland. His goal was the match winner, and secured Viborg a place in the 2025–26 Danish Superliga Championship round. He became a regular starter for the Viborg first-team during his first full season, appearing in 27 of Viborg's 32 Superliga games with one goal.

== International career ==
Bidstrup made his international debut for the Denmark U17 team on 4 August 2022 in a 12–0 victory over Northern Ireland U17. On 11 February 2023, he scored his first goal for the U17 team in a 4–4 draw against Croatia U17.

== Personal life ==
Hjalte is the younger brother of Mads Bidstrup.

== Career statistics ==
As of match played 25 October 2026

Appearances and goals by club, season and competition
Club	Season	League			Cup (Note: Includes Danish Cup)		Other		Total	
Club	Season	Division	Apps	Goals	Apps	Goals	Apps	Goals	Apps	Goals
Copenhagen	2024–25	Danish Superliga	0	0	0	0	0	0	0	0
Viborg	2024–25	Danish Superliga	7	0	0	0	—		7	0
Viborg	2025–26	Danish Superliga	27	1	6	0	—		33	1
Viborg	2026–27	Danish Superliga	8	0	0	0	—		8	0
Viborg	Total		42	1	6	0	0	0	48	1
Career Total			42	1	6	0	0	0	48	1
