= Filip Đukić =

Montenegrin footballer (born 1999)

Personal information
- Date of birth: 6 August 1999 (age 27)
- Place of birth: Hvidovre, Denmark
- Height: 1.81 m (5 ft 11 in)
- Position: Goalkeeper

Team information
- Current team: Hvidovre

Youth career
- 2003–2012: Rosenhøj Boldklub
- 2012–2018: Copenhagen

Senior career*
| Years | Team | Apps | (Gls) |
| 2018–2020 | Hvidovre | 51 | (0) |
| 2020–2021 | Fremad Amager | 0 | (0) |
| 2021–2025 | Hvidovre | 108 | (0) |
| 2025 | Horsens | 3 | (0) |
| 2025–2026 | Viborg | 0 | (0) |
| 2026– | Hvidovre | 7 | (0) |

International career^{‡}
| 2017 | Montenegro U19 | 1 | (0) |
| 2019–2020 | Montenegro U21 | 5 | (0) |
| 2023– | Montenegro | 1 | (0) |
- * Club domestic league appearances and goals as of 20:42, 7 September 2026 (UTC) ‡ National team caps and goals as of 07:49, 20 November 2023 (UTC)

Filip Đukić (Montenegrin: Филип Ђукић, also transliterated Djukić, born 6 August 1999) is a Montenegrin professional footballer who plays as a goalkeeper for Danish 1st Division club Hvidovre. Born in Denmark, he plays for the Montenegro national team.

== Club career ==
Filip Đukić was born in Hvidovre, Capital Region of Denmark, and started playing football as a four-year-old for local club Rosenhøj Boldklub. In 2012, he joined FC Copenhagen's youth academy, a club he had supported as a youth.

After progressing through Copenhagen's academy, Đukić joined hometown club Hvidovre IF on a senior contract in 2018. On 15 August 2018, he made his senior debut in a first-round Danish Cup loss to Fremad Amager. Đukić made his league debut two months later, on 7 October 2018, replacing Alexander Horsebøg as the team performed poorly. After a shaky start Hvidovre decided to keep him as first choice. His first starter for a Danish 1st Division match against Fremad Amager, which ended in a 2–2 draw.

In October 2020, Đukić joined league rivals Fremad Amager, before returning to Hvidovre on a short-term contract just months later, in January 2021. He signed a contract extension with the club in June 2021. He reached promotion to the Danish Superliga with Hvidovre in the 2022–23 season, and extended his contract with the club until 2024 shortly after. On 21 July 2023, he made his Superliga debut in a 1–0 loss to Midtjylland, where he saved Gustav Isaksen's penalty.

On 3 February 2025, on transfer deadline day, it was confirmed that Đukić moved to Danish 1st Division club AC Horsens on a deal until June 2026. Several months later, on 24 July 2025, he moved to Viborg on a two-year contract. He returned to Hvidovre on 15 July 2026 after making only one appearance for Viborg.

== International career ==
On 5 June 2019, Đukić gained his first cap for the Montenegro national under-21 team, coming on as a substitute during the second half of a 0–0 friendly draw against Georgia.

== Career statistics ==
=== Club ===
As of match played 4 September 2026

Appearances and goals by club, season and competition
| Club | Season | League | | | Danish Cup | | Other | | Total | |
| Club | Season | Division | Apps | Goals | Apps | Goals | Apps | Goals | Apps | Goals |
|---|---|---|---|---|---|---|---|---|---|---|
| Hvidovre | 2018–19 | 1st Division | 22 | 0 | 1 | 0 | — | | 23 | 0 |
| Hvidovre | 2019–20 | 1st Division | 29 | 0 | 0 | 0 | — | | 29 | 0 |
| Hvidovre | Total | | 51 | 0 | 1 | 0 | — | | 52 | 0 |
| Fremad Amager | 2020–21 | 1st Division | 0 | 0 | 0 | 0 | — | | 0 | 0 |
| Hvidovre | 2020–21 | 1st Division | 11 | 0 | 0 | 0 | — | | 11 | 0 |
| Hvidovre | 2021–22 | 1st Division | 22 | 0 | 6 | 0 | — | | 28 | 0 |
| Hvidovre | 2022–23 | 1st Division | 32 | 0 | 1 | 0 | — | | 33 | 0 |
| Hvidovre | 2023–24 | Superliga | 25 | 0 | 0 | 0 | 0 | 0 | 25 | 0 |
| Hvidovre | 2024–25 | 1st Division | 18 | 0 | 1 | 0 | — | | 19 | 0 |
| Hvidovre | Total | | 108 | 0 | 8 | 0 | 0 | 0 | 116 | 0 |
| Viborg | 2025–26 | Danish Superliga | 0 | 0 | 1 | 0 | — | | 1 | 0 |
| Hvidovre | 2026–27 | Danish 1st Division | 7 | 0 | 0 | 0 | — | | 7 | 0 |
| Career total | | | 166 | 0 | 10 | 0 | 0 | 0 | 176 | 0 |

=== International ===
As of match played 19 November 2023

Appearances and goals by national team and year
| National team | Year | Apps | Goals |
|---|---|---|---|
Montenegro
| Montenegro | 2023 | 1 | 0 |
| Total | | 1 | 0 |
