= Viktor Hjorth =

Danish footballer (born 2005)

Personal information
- Date of birth: 24 February 2005 (age 21)
- Place of birth: Denmark
- Position: Centre-back

Youth career
- NUGF Viborg
- Viborg FF

Senior career*
Years	Team	Apps	(Gls)
2023–2025	Viborg FF	1	(0)
2024	→ Skive (loan)	12	(0)
- * Club domestic league appearances and goals as of 21:03, 1 January 2025 (UTC)

Viktor Hjorth (born 24 February 2005) is a retired Danish professional footballer who played as a centre-back.

== Club career ==
=== Viborg FF ===
Hjorth is a product of NUGF Viborg and later joined Viborg FF as a youth player. In the 2021–22 season, 16-year-old Hjorth was promoted to the club's U-19 team a year early, and he also got playing time in training matches and in the Reserve League for the first team.

In February 2023, Hjorth began to make his way into the first-team, when he was selected for the first-team squad to attend a training camp in Spain. One month later, on 12 March 2023, Hjorth made his official debut for Viborg FF when he was substituted for the last few minutes of the Danish Superliga match against FC Nordsjælland.

In July 2024 it was confirmed, that Hjorth joined Danish 2nd Division side Skive IK on a six-months loan deal. However, on January 21, 2025, Skive confirmed that the parties had extended the loan until the end of the season.

In the summer of 2025, Hjorth was without a contract and therefore decided to end his professional career at the age of 20.
