= Lasse Flø =

Danish footballer (born 2005)

Personal information
- Full name: Lasse Flø Borregaard
- Date of birth: 15 October 2005 (age 21)
- Place of birth: Rask Mølle, Hedensted Municipality, Denmark
- Height: 1.87 m (6 ft 2 in)
- Position: Right-back

Team information
- Current team: Westerlo
- Number: 2

Youth career
- 2008–2015: Rask Mølle OI
- 2015–2017: Hedensted
- 2017–2024: Vejle

Senior career*
Years	Team	Apps	(Gls)
2023–2026	Vejle	40	(1)
2026–	Westerlo	2	(0)

International career^{‡}
2023	Denmark U18	2	(0)
2024	Denmark U19	2	(0)
2024	Denmark U20	3	(0)
- * Club domestic league appearances and goals as of 15 August 2026 ‡ National team caps and goals as of 19 November 2024

Lasse Flø Borregaard (born 15 October 2005) is a Danish professional footballer who plays as a right-back for Belgian Pro League club Westerlo.

== Career ==
=== Vejle Boldklub ===
Born on 15 October 2005, Flø laced up his first football boots at Rask Mølle OI before he was three years old. With his mother as coach, he played on his older sister's team, and later he also played on a boys' team with his father as coach in the small East Jutland club. As an U10 player, Flø then moved to Hedensted IF, before joining Vejle Boldklub as an U13 player in 2017.

In Vejle, Flø worked his way up through the club's youth system, but not without bumps in the road, as he suffered a anterior cruciate ligament injury in March 2022 and had to sit out for almost a year. However, Flø made a strong return and made his official debut for Vejle in the Danish 1st Division on 28 May 2023, in a match against FC Helsingør, replacing Miiko Albornoz in the 62nd minute.

In 2024, Flø was a regular in the first team before he was permanently promoted in May 2024 and extended his contract until June 2026.

In the 2023–24 season Flø didn't get a single game for Vejle in the Danish Superliga, but when the club got new coaches in February 2025, after being sold to Danish investors, Flø could finally made his debut in the Danish Superliga when he started at right back against Silkeborg IF on 16 February 2025.

On 25 July 2026, Flø moved to Belgium and signed a four-year contract with Westerlo.

== Honours ==
Vejle

- Danish 1st Division: 2022–23
