= Adam Nygaard =

Danish footballer (born 2005)

Personal information
- Full name: Adam Nygaard Andersen
- Date of birth: 23 September 2005 (age 21)
- Place of birth: Viborg, Denmark
- Position: Centre-back

Team information
- Current team: Fredericia
- Number: 3

Youth career
- Viborg FF
- Midtjylland

Senior career*
Years	Team	Apps	(Gls)
2023–2025	Midtjylland	0	(0)
2024–2025	→ Fredericia (loan)	12	(0)
2025–	Fredericia	27	(0)

International career
2024	Denmark U-19	1	(0)
- * Club domestic league appearances and goals as of 19 May 2026

Adam Nygaard Andersen (born 23 September 2005) is a Danish professional footballer who plays as a centre-back for Danish Superliga side FC Fredericia.

== Club career ==
=== FC Midtjylland ===
Nygaard came through the youth system of FC Midtjylland, having joined the club from Viborg FF as an under-14 player and signed his first youth contract with Midtjylland before the 2020–21 season, when he turned 15. During his time at Midtjylland, he was part of the youth setup that won the Danish U19 Championship and played in the UEFA Youth League.

On 6 September 2023, Nygaard made his official debut for FC Midtjylland in a Danish Cup match against Aabenraa BK. One month later, Nygaard signed a contract extension with Midtjylland that would keep him at the club until June 2028.

=== FC Fredericia ===
In August 2024, Nygaard joined FC Fredericia on loan from Midtjylland for the 2024–25 season to gain first-team experience. With 12 league appearances for the club, Nygaard was part of the FC Fredericia squad that secured promotion to the 2025–26 Danish Superliga for the first time in the club's history.

Following his loan spell, he signed a permanent contract with FC Fredericia on 25 June 2025, agreeing a deal until June 2029. On 20 July 2025, Nygaard made his Danish Superliga debut for FC Fredericia in a league match against FC Nordsjælland.
