= Tim Freriks =

Dutch footballer (born 1998)

Personal information
- Date of birth: 2 October 1998 (age 28)
- Place of birth: Zaandam, Netherlands
- Height: 1.94 m (6 ft 4 in)
- Position: Forward

Team information
- Current team: Viborg
- Number: 9

Youth career
- –2010: PSCK Zaandam
- 2010–2012: Hercules Zaandam
- 2012–2016: KFC
- 2016–2017: Groningen

Senior career*
Years	Team	Apps	(Gls)
2017–2019	Jong Groningen	46	(12)
2018–2019	Groningen	7	(0)
2019	Jong FC Utrecht	4	(0)
2019–2020	OFC Oostzaan	20	(12)
2020–2023	Katwijk	72	(15)
2023–2024	AB	25	(12)
2024–2025	Esbjerg fB	34	(16)
2025–	Viborg	23	(4)
- * Club domestic league appearances and goals as of 21:30, 25 October 2026 (UTC)

Tim Freriks (born 2 October 1998) is a Dutch footballer who plays as a forward for Danish Superliga club Viborg

== Career ==
Freriks took his first steps in football at PSCK Zaandam. Meanwhile, the club merged with VVZ to become Hercules Zaandam. He then moved to KFC before being scouted by FC Groningen, who he ended up joining.

Freriks quickly became a prolific scorer for Groningen's U-19 team and the U-21 team, Jong FC Groningen. He made his Eredivisie debut on 6 May 2018 in a match against PSV Eindhoven, with 19-year-old Freriks coming on for the final few minutes. In the following 2018–19 season, Freriks made just seven appearances for Groningen in the first half of the season.

In January 2019 Freriks made the switch to FC Utrecht. However, it was not a successful stay as Freriks suffered from chronic intestinal inflammation during his time at the club and only played four games for the club's Jong FC Utrecht team. To get back on track, Freriks took a step back and joined OFC Oostzaan in the Dutch fourth tier. Already six months later, in December 2019, it was confirmed that he would join Tweede Divisie club VV Katwijk for the upcoming 2020–21 season.

After three seasons at VV Katwijk, Freriks moved to Danish 2nd Division club Akademisk Boldklub in the summer of 2023. After a good season where he scored 15 goals in 30 games in all competitions, Freriks was sold to newly promoted Danish 1st Division club Esbjerg fB in the summer of 2024, where he was signed until June 2027.

On 4 August 2025, Freriks was sold to Danish Superliga club Viborg on a three-year contract. He was given the number 9 shirt. He made his debut for the club in a 1–0 victory against Sønderjyske on 8 August. On 4 September, he scored his first goal of the club in a 1–0 victory over AC Horsens in the Danish Cup.
