= Gustav Marcussen =

Danish footballer (born 1998)

Personal information
- Full name: Gustav Ølsted Marcussen
- Date of birth: 12 June 1998 (age 28)
- Place of birth: Hørsholm, Denmark
- Height: 1.78 m (5 ft 10 in)
- Position: Winger

Team information
- Current team: Vejle
- Number: 18

Youth career
- Hørsholm-Usserød
- B 1903
- Frem
- Lyngby

Senior career*
| Years | Team | Apps | (Gls) |
| 2017–2020 | Lyngby | 72 | (6) |
| 2020–2021 | Uerdingen 05 | 25 | (4) |
| 2021 | Silkeborg | 3 | (0) |
| 2022–2023 | Fremad Amager | 47 | (10) |
| 2023–2026 | Fredericia | 86 | (23) |
| 2026– | Vejle | 9 | (1) |

International career
| 2015 | Denmark U17 | 0 | (0) |
| 2016 | Denmark U18 | 2 | (4) |
| 2016–2017 | Denmark U19 | 7 | (1) |
| 2017–2019 | Denmark U20 | 6 | (0) |
| 2018–2020 | Denmark U21 | 3 | (0) |
- * Club domestic league appearances and goals as of 08:55, 12 October 2026 (UTC)

Gustav Ølsted Marcussen (Danish pronunciation: [ˈmɑːkʰusn̩]; born 12 June 1998) is a Danish professional footballer who plays as a winger for Danish 1st Division club Vejle.

== Club career ==
=== Lyngby ===
Marcussen played youth football in Hørsholm-Usserød, B 1903 and Frem before joining the academy of Lyngby. He was promoted to the first team in 2016, where he signed his first professional deal with the club. On 31 August 2016, Marcussen made his official debut for Lyngby, starting in a 3–1 win in the Danish Cup over Frederiksværk FK in the second round. Marcussen made his Danish Superliga-debut for Lyngby on 18 May 2017 in a match against Brøndby IF. He came off the bench in the 87th minute, replacing David Boysen as the match ended in a 0–2 away win for Lyngby. Three days later, he made his second appearance for the club, once again replacing Boysen as Lyngby beat F.C. Copenhagen in a 3–1 home win. Those two appearances were his only during the 2016–2017 season. Marcussen made his first professional goal the following season, scoring an 86th-minute equaliser which secured a 1–1 home draw against SønderjyskE on 12 August 2017. He ended the season with 15 league appearances and the one goal, as Lyngby suffered relegation to the second division.

The departure of first-team profiles such as Mikkel Rygaard and talents such as Bror Blume, due to relegation and Lyngby's poor financial situation, meant that Marcussen saw more playing time during the 2018–19 season. He had an eventful season, making 28 total appearances in which he scored two goals. The campaign culminated with a third place in the league table and promotion play-offs, which Lyngby won 4–3 over two legs against Vendsyssel FF and thereby secured promotion back to the Superliga after one year. Prior to the new Superliga-season, Marcussen signed a new contract with Lyngby on 25 June 2019, keeping him a part of De Kongeblå until 2021.

=== Uerdingen 05 ===
On 23 September 2020, it was announced that Marcussen had moved to German 3. Liga club Uerdingen 05. He made his debut for the club on 4 October in a 0–0 draw against Hansa Rostock. He scored his first goal for the club on 24 October in a 2–0 away win over MSV Duisburg. For Uerdingen he made 25 appearances and scored four goals, but he was only in the starting line-up in eleven games. After Uerdingen had their license to play in the 3. Liga revoked due to financial problems, Marcussen terminated his contract on 3 June 2021.

=== Silkeborg ===
After a trial, Marcussen joined Danish Superliga club Silkeborg IF on 30 July 2021, signing a deal for the rest of 2021. He made his debut for the club on 15 August, coming on as a substitute in the 74th minute for Mads Kaalund in a 1–1 league draw against OB. Marcussen left the club again at the end of the year.

=== Fremad Amager ===
On 12 January 2022, Marcussen signed with Danish 1st Division club Fremad Amager on a contract running until 2024. He made his competitive debut for the club on 19 February, starting in a 1–1 away draw against Jammerbugt. He scored his first goal for the club on 25 February in a 4–2 home victory over Esbjerg fB.

Marcussen went on to score 10 goals in 50 appearances for Fremad Amager before departing the club after a season and a half.

=== Fredericia ===
On 4 July 2023, following his departure from Fremad Amager, FC Fredericia announced the signing of Marcussen on a contract valid until June 2026. He made his debut on 23 July, coming on as a 69th-minute substitute for Eskild Dall in a 2–0 home defeat to Hobro on the opening matchday of the season. He scored his first goal for Fredericia on 18 August, contributing to a 5–0 away win over B.93 at Østerbro Stadium.

Marcussen finished the 2023–24 season with five goals in 34 appearances, as Fredericia secured a fifth-place league finish and reached the semi-finals of the Danish Cup, equalling their best performance in the competition alongside the 2017–18 campaign.

On 1 September 2024, he recorded his first senior hat-trick, scoring all three goals in Fredericia's 4–3 away win over HB Køge. In his first season he helped the club getting promoted to the Danish Superliga for the first time in club history existence.

=== Vejle ===
On 20 May 2026, Marcussen joined recently relegated Danish 1st Division club Vejle on a free transfer, signing a three-year contract.

== International career ==
Marcussen represented Denmark at every age group from under-18 to under-21 level. On 22 March 2018, he made his first appearance for the Denmark under-21 team in a 5–0 friendly win over Austria in Wiener Neustadt.

== Career statistics ==
As of match played 7 October 2025

Appearances and goals by club, season and competition
| Club | Season | League | | | Cup | | Other | | Total | |
| Club | Season | Division | Apps | Goals | Apps | Goals | Apps | Goals | Apps | Goals |
|---|---|---|---|---|---|---|---|---|---|---|
| Lyngby | 2016–17 | Superliga | 2 | 0 | 2 | 0 | — | | 4 | 0 |
| Lyngby | 2017–18 | Superliga | 16 | 1 | 2 | 0 | 2 (Note: Appearances in the Superliga play-offs) | 0 | 20 | 1 |
| Lyngby | 2018–19 | 1st Division | 26 | 2 | 1 | 0 | 2 | 0 | 29 | 2 |
| Lyngby | 2019–20 | Superliga | 26 | 3 | 1 | 1 | 2 | 0 | 29 | 4 |
| Lyngby | 2020–21 | Superliga | 2 | 0 | 0 | 0 | — | | 2 | 0 |
| Lyngby | Total | | 72 | 6 | 6 | 1 | 6 | 0 | 84 | 7 |
| Uerdingen 05 | 2020–21 | 3. Liga | 25 | 4 | 0 | 0 | 1 (Note: Appearance(s) in Lower Rhine Cup) | 0 | 26 | 2 |
| Silkeborg | 2021–22 | Superliga | 3 | 0 | 1 | 0 | — | | 4 | 0 |
| Fremad Amager | 2021–22 | 1st Division | 15 | 5 | — | | — | | 15 | 5 |
| Fremad Amager | 2022–23 | 1st Division | 32 | 5 | 3 | 0 | — | | 35 | 5 |
| Fremad Amager | Total | | 47 | 10 | 3 | 0 | — | | 50 | 10 |
| Fredericia | 2023–24 | 1st Division | 27 | 3 | 7 | 2 | — | | 34 | 5 |
| Fredericia | 2024–25 | 1st Division | 30 | 16 | 3 | 0 | — | | 33 | 16 |
| Fredericia | 2025–26 | Danish Superliga | 11 | 3 | 2 | 0 | — | | 13 | 3 |
| Fredericia | Total | | 68 | 22 | 12 | 2 | — | | 80 | 14 |
| Career total | | | 215 | 42 | 22 | 3 | 7 | 0 | 237 | 45 |
