= Charly Nouck =

Danish footballer (born 2004)

- Nouck (front) in 2026

Personal information
- Full name: Charly Ngos Nouck Hornemann
- Date of birth: 21 March 2004 (age 22)
- Place of birth: Odense, Denmark
- Height: 1.84 m (6 ft 0 in)
- Position: Winger

Team information
- Current team: Viborg
- Number: 11

Youth career
- –2019: OKS
- 2019–2021: Næsby
- 2021–2022: OB

Senior career*
Years	Team	Apps	(Gls)
2022–2024	OB	41	(3)
2024–	Viborg	64	(12)

International career^{‡}
2022–2023	Denmark U19	7	(2)
2023	Denmark U20	2	(0)
2026	Denmark U21	1	(0)
- * Club domestic league appearances and goals as of 16:28, 3 October 2026 (UTC) ‡ National team caps and goals as of 10:22, 7 October 2026 (UTC)

Charly Ngos Nouck Horneman (born 21 March 2004) is a Danish professional footballer who plays as a winger or a forward for Viborg FF in the Danish Superliga.

== Club career ==
=== OB ===
Nouck's youth career began at smaller clubs in Odense, OKS and Næsby. He joined OB in the summer of 2021 where he started with the club's youth team as an under-19 player. In July 2022, he was promoted to the first team while also signing a contract until 2026. He made his professional debut on 24 July 2022, scoring once in a 2–2 draw against Randers in the Danish Superliga. His debut season saw him make 17 appearances while scoring two goals in the Superliga, as well as two assists. His second season with the first team saw him struggle to score, with only one goal over 26 total appearances, while OB was relegated.

=== Viborg ===
Nouck was sold to fellow Danish club Viborg, signing a contract until June 2028. The deal which saw him move to Viborg included OB receiving Jakob Bonde. He made his debut on 4 August, playing the final 13 minutes in a 3–2 loss to Silkeborg. His first goal for the club came on 27 October, scoring the final goal in a 4–2 win. His first season finished with five goals from 31 appearances.

In November 2025, Nouck scored twice in a 5–2 over Vejle. One of his two goals was named as the Superliga goal of the round. Nouck extended his contract with Viborg on 24 February 2026, keeping him with the club until the summer of 2029.

== Career statistics ==
As of match played 20 September 2026

Appearances and goals by club, season and competition
Club	Season	League			Cup (Note: Includes appearances in the Danish Cup)		Other		Total	
Club	Season	Division	Apps	Goals	Apps	Goals	Apps	Goals	Apps	Goals
OB	2022–23	Danish Superliga	17	2	1	0	—		18	2
OB	2023–24	Danish Superliga	24	1	2	0	—		26	1
OB	Total		41	3	3	0	0	0	44	3
Viborg	2024–25	Danish Superliga	26	3	5	2	—		31	5
Viborg	2025–26	Danish Superliga	29	6	4	1	—		33	7
Viborg	2026–27	Danish Superliga	9	3	1	0	—		10	3
Viborg	Total		64	12	10	3	0	0	74	15
Career total			105	15	13	3	0	0	118	19
