= Frederik Rieper =

Danish footballer (born 1999)

Personal information
- Full name: Frederik Thykær Rieper
- Date of birth: 19 June 1999 (age 27)
- Place of birth: Aarhus, Denmark
- Height: 1.96 m (6 ft 5 in)
- Position: Centre-back

Team information
- Current team: Fredericia
- Number: 5

Youth career
- ASA
- AGF
- –2016: Vejle
- 2016–2018: IF Lyseng

College career
Years	Team	Apps	(Gls)
2019–2020	Hofstra Pride	19	(5)

Senior career*
Years	Team	Apps	(Gls)
2018–2019	IF Lyseng		
2020–2021	IF Lyseng		
2021–2024	Aarhus Fremad	73	(8)
2024	Silkeborg	5	(0)
2024–	Fredericia	64	(2)
- * Club domestic league appearances and goals as of 19 May 2026

Frederik Thykær Rieper (born 19 June 1999) is a Danish professional footballer who plays as a centre-back for and captains Danish Superliga club FC Fredericia.

== Career ==
=== Club career ===
Born and raised in Aarhus, Rieper started his football journey in ASA Fodbold. At the age of 13, Rieper switched to AGF's academy, which he was a part of until he went to continuation school and then spent some time at Vejle Boldklub.

After Vejle, IF Lyseng became the new destination, where Rieper played for a number of years with only one break, when he crossed the Atlantic in the summer of 2019 and became part of Hofstra Pride, which is the football team affiliated with Hofstra University on Long Island in New York. Unfortunately, the adventure was cut short when corona sent Rieper home.

On 22 June 2021 the Danish 2nd Division club Aarhus Fremad confirmed that they had signed Rieper on a two-year contract. In January 2023, after 47 games and 3 goals, Rieper signed a new contract with the Aarhus club until the end of 2024.

In early January 2024, it emerged that Rieper was on a trial stay at Danish Superliga club Silkeborg IF. A week later, the club confirmed that Rieper had signed a contract until the end of the season. On 18 February 2024 Rieper made his official debut in professional football when he was in the starting lineup in a Danish Superliga match against F.C. Copenhagen, which Rieper and co. lost 0–3.

On 28 May 2024 it was confirmed that Rieper would leave the club at the end of the season after his short stay in Silkeborg, and from the coming season he would represent Danish 1st Division club FC Fredericia, where he had signed a deal until June 2027. In his first season he helped the club getting promoted to the Danish Superliga for the first time in club history existence.

== Personal life ==
Frederik Rieper is the son of former Danish international and West Ham United player, Marc Rieper. Frederik's uncle, Mads Rieper, is also a former football player who played several years in the Danish clubs AGF and AC Horsens.
