= Lilian Njoh =

Cameroonian footballer (born 2005)

Personal information
- Full name: Lilian Paul René Njoh
- Date of birth: 21 November 2001 (age 24)
- Place of birth: Toulouse, France
- Height: 1.80 m (5 ft 11 in)
- Position: Left-back

Team information
- Current team: Servette
- Number: 14

Youth career
- Albi
- Muret
- Union Saint-Jean
- Colomiers

Senior career*
Years	Team	Apps	(Gls)
2021–2022	Colomiers	9	(0)
2022–2023	Le Mans FC II	14	(0)
2022–2024	Le Mans FC	29	(0)
2024–2025	Salernitana	26	(0)
2025–	Servette	45	(1)

International career^{‡}
2026–	Cameroon	2	(0)
- * Club domestic league appearances and goals as of 19 September 2026 ‡ National team caps and goals as of 29 September 2026

Lilian Paul René Njoh (born 21 November 2001) is a professional footballer who plays as a left-back for Swiss Super League club Servette. Born in France, he plays for the Cameroon national team.

== Career ==
Njoh is a product of the youth academies of the French clubs Albi, Muret, Union Saint-Jean and Colomiers. He made his senior debut with Colomiers in the Championnat National 2 in 2021. On 4 June 2022, he transferred to Le Mans FC in the Championnat National. On 11 July 2024, he transferred to the Serie B team Salernitana. On 31 July 2025, he joined the Swiss Super League club Servette on a two-year contract.

== Personal life ==
Njoh was born in France to a Cameroonian father and French mother, and holds dual French-Cameroonian citizenship. He is the older brother of the professional footballer Yonis Njoh.

== Career statistics ==
=== Club ===
As of match played 19 September 2026

Appearances and goals by club, season and competition
Club	Season	League			National cup (Note: Includes Coupe de France, Coppa Italia, Swiss Cup)		Europe		Other		Total	
Club	Season	Division	Apps	Goals	Apps	Goals	Apps	Goals	Apps	Goals	Apps	Goals
Colomiers	2021–22	CFA 1	9	0	—		—		—		9	0
Le Mans FC II	2022–23	CFA 1	14	0	—		—		—		14	0
Le Mans FC	2022–23	Ligue 3	8	0	2	0	—		—		10	0
Le Mans FC	2023–24	Ligue 3	21	0	2	0	—		—		23	0
Le Mans FC	Total		29	0	4	0	—		—		33	0
Salernitana	2024–25	Serie B	26	0	1	0	—		—		27	0
Servette	2025–26	Swiss Super League	37	1	2	0	2 (Note: Appearances in UEFA Conference League)	1	—		41	2
Servette	2026–27	Swiss Super League	8	0	1	2	—		—		9	2
Servette	Total		45	1	3	2	2	1	—		50	4
Career total			123	1	8	2	2	1	0	0	133	4

=== International ===
As of match played 29 September 2026

Appearances and goals by national team and year
National team	Year	Apps	Goals
Cameroon	2026	2	0
Total		2	0
