= Srđan Kuzmić =

Slovenian footballer (born 2004)

Personal information
- Date of birth: 16 January 2004 (age 22)
- Place of birth: Slovenia
- Height: 1.83 m (6 ft 0 in)
- Position: Right-back

Team information
- Current team: Lorient
- Number: 30

Youth career
- –2016: Dragomer
- 2016–2017: Dobrova
- 2017–2021: Ilirija 1911

Senior career*
Years	Team	Apps	(Gls)
2020–2022	Ilirija 1911	24	(0)
2022–2023	Mura	25	(0)
2023–2026	Viborg	74	(6)
2026–	Lorient	2	(0)

International career^{‡}
2018–2019	Slovenia U15	9	(1)
2019	Slovenia U16	8	(1)
2020	Slovenia U17	1	(0)
2021–2022	Slovenia U18	4	(1)
2021–2023	Slovenia U19	12	(1)
2022–2026	Slovenia U21	22	(0)
2024–	Slovenia	6	(0)
- * Club domestic league appearances and goals as of 03:49, 16 November 2026 (UTC) ‡ National team caps and goals as of 23:35, 16 November 2026 (UTC)

Srđan Kuzmić (born 16 January 2004) is a Slovenian professional footballer who plays as a right-back for Ligue 1 club Lorient and the Slovenia national team.

== Club career ==
Kuzmić played youth football for Ilirija 1911, where he made his senior debut and became a regular for the team that competed in the Slovenian second division in the 2021–22 season. On 27 May 2022, Kuzmić joined Slovenian top division club Mura on a contract until the end of the 2024–25 season.

On 22 July 2023, Kuzmić transferred to the Danish Superliga club Viborg FF for an alleged transfer fee of €500,000, and signed a deal until 2027. He made his league debut on 24 July 2023 in a 4–1 defeat to Nordsjælland. During his time at Viborg, he appeared in 86 matches and scored six goals.

French club Lorient announced on 31 August 2026 that they had signed Kuzmić on a four-year contract until 2030, for a rumoured transfer fee of €3 million.

== International career ==
Kuzmić made his debut for the senior Slovenia national team on 20 January 2024 in a friendly against the United States.
