= Thomas Jørgensen =

Danish footballer (born 2005)

- Jørgensen with Viborg in 2025

Personal information
- Date of birth: 30 September 2005 (age 21)
- Place of birth: Denmark
- Height: 1.84 m (6 ft 0 in)
- Position: Midfielder

Team information
- Current team: Toulouse
- Number: 8

Youth career
- Herfølge
- –2024: Copenhagen

Senior career*
Years	Team	Apps	(Gls)
2023–2024	Copenhagen	0	(0)
2024	→ Hvidovre (loan)	15	(0)
2024–2026	Viborg	62	(8)
2026–	Toulouse	10	(3)

International career^{‡}
2023	Denmark U18	5	(2)
2023–2024	Denmark U19	15	(1)
2024–	Denmark U21	11	(2)
2026–	Denmark	1	(0)
- * Club domestic league appearances and goals as of 21:58, 6 November 2026 (UTC) ‡ National team caps and goals as of 20:45, 24 September 2026 (UTC)

Thomas Jørgensen (born 30 September 2005) is a Danish professional footballer who plays as a midfielder for Ligue 1 club Toulouse and the Denmark national team.

== Club career ==
Jørgensen joined Copenhagen from Herfølge Boldklub in his youth. He played for the Copenhagen youth teams and, as a 17-year-old, Jørgensen signed a new three-year contract in December 2022. In May 2023, he was included in the first-team squad for the first time for a Danish Superliga match against AGF. However, it did not turn into a debut.

Still with his professional debut still to come, Jørgensen was loaned out to Hvidovre IF in January 2024 until the end of the 2024–25 season. During his loan spell, Jørgensen played every game for Hvidovre, starting most of them. He was named Young Player of the Month in the Danish Superliga in March 2024. However, Hvidovre were relegated to the Danish 1st Division and Jørgensen returned to Copenhagen at the end of his loan.

=== Viborg ===
On 20 August 2024, Viborg confirmed that they had signed Jørgensen on a deal until the summer of 2028 for a reported fee of kr. 4,500,000. He made his debut for the club six days later on 26 August in a 1–0 home victory for Viborg over Lyngby. After initially being assigned number 12 upon his transfer, the club announced on 16 July that he would play the upcoming season wearing the number 10. On 7 December, the Danish Superliga announced that he had been selected as Player of the Month and Young Player of the Month for November 2025. After appearing in 31 of Viborg's 32 league matches during the 2025–26 season, he was named to the Superliga's team of the year.

=== Toulouse ===
Jørgensen joined French club Toulouse on 19 August 2026 with a four-year contract. With a reported fee of kr. 57,500,000, he became the most expensive player sold in Viborg's history. Three days later, on 22 August, he made his debut for the club in a 2–0 Ligue 1 loss to Lyon. On 12 September, he scored his first goal for the club, scoring in the 69th minute to secure a 2–2 draw versus Lorient. He scored again the following week, winning a penalty, assisting in one goal, and scoring the decisive goal in a 3–2 win.

== International career ==
After initially being invited to train with the senior national team, Jørgensen was instead called up to the Denmark national team ahead of a friendly match versus Ukraine. He was an unused substitute during the match, which was ultimately abandoned during the second half.

Jørgensen was one of the players who were called-up with the Denmark national team by head coach Brian Riemer for the UEFA Nations League matches against Norway, Wales, and Portugal during September and October 2026. He made his national team debut on 24 September, coming on as a substitute in a 3–2 loss to Norway.

== Career statistics ==
=== Club ===
As of match played 6 November 2026

Appearances and goals by club, season and competition
Club	Season	League			National cup (Note: Includes appearances in Danish Cup)		Other		Total	
Club	Season	Division	Apps	Goals	Apps	Goals	Apps	Goals	Apps	Goals
Hvidovre (loan)	2023–24	Danish Superliga	15	0	0	0	—		15	0
Viborg	2024–25	Danish Superliga	27	3	5	0	—		32	3
Viborg	2025–26	Danish Superliga	31	4	5	1	—		36	5
Viborg	2026–27	Danish Superliga	4	1	0	0	—		4	1
Viborg	Total		62	8	10	1	0	0	72	9
Toulouse	2026–27	Ligue 1	10	3	0	0	—		10	3
Career Total			87	11	10	1	0	0	97	12

=== International ===
As of match played 24 September 2026

Appearances and goals by national team and year
National team	Year	Apps	Goals
Denmark	2026	1	0
Total		1	0

== Honours ==
Individual

- Danish Superliga Player of the Month: November 2025
- Danish Superliga Young Player of the Month: March 2024, November 2025
- Danish Superliga Team of the Year: 2025–26
- Viborg Player of the Year: 2025–26
