= Yonis Njoh =

French footballer (born 2004)

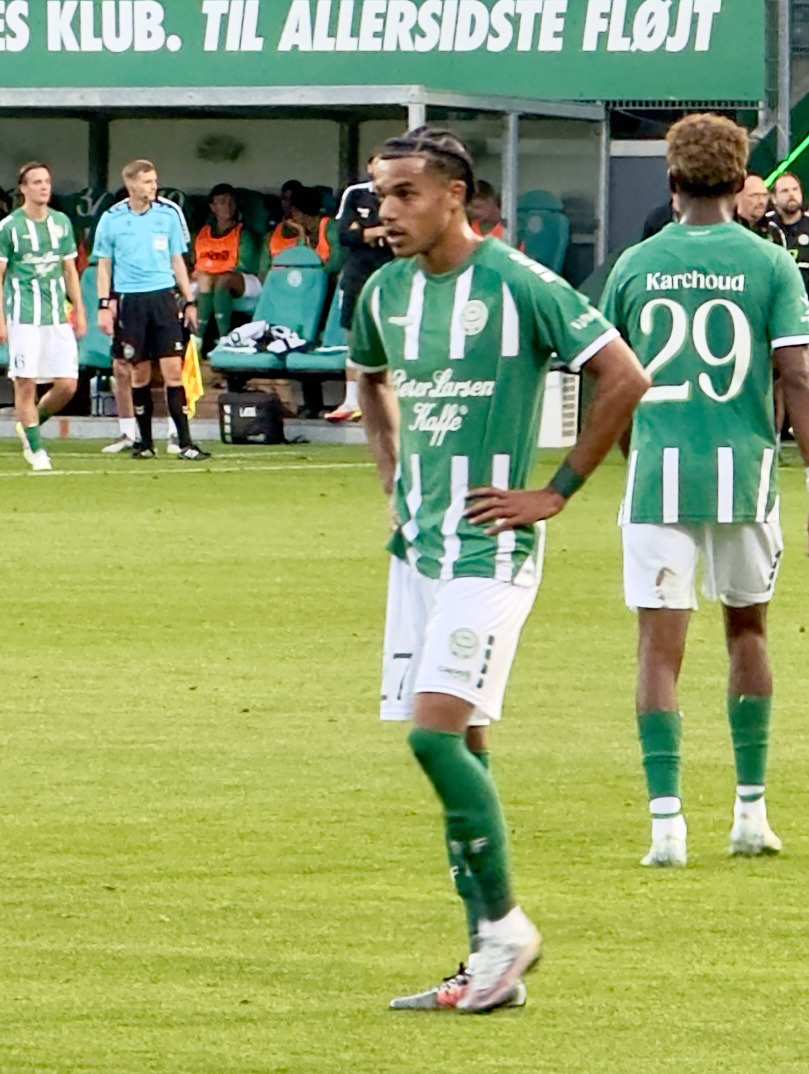
- Njoh with Viborg in 2025

Personal information
- Full name: Yonis Lucien Alexandre Njoh
- Date of birth: 17 January 2004 (age 22)
- Place of birth: Toulouse, France
- Height: 1.85 m (6 ft 1 in)
- Position: Forward

Team information
- Current team: Viborg
- Number: 7

Youth career
- 2010–2017: L'Union
- 2017–2022: Toulouse

Senior career*
Years	Team	Apps	(Gls)
2022	Toulouse II	2	(0)
2022–2023	Orléans II	11	(3)
2022–2023	Orléans	11	(0)
2023–2025	Pau II	16	(3)
2023–2025	Pau FC	24	(1)
2025	→ Viborg (loan)	14	(5)
2025–	Viborg	10	(2)
- * Club domestic league appearances and goals as of 18:08, 17 May 2026 (UTC)

Yonis Lucien Alexandre Njoh (born 17 January 2004) is a French professional footballer who plays as a forward for Danish Superliga side Viborg FF, having joined the club following a loan from Ligue 2 club Pau FC.

== Career ==
Njoh began playing football with L'Union Saint Jean Football Club in L'Union, near Toulouse. He joined the Toulouse FC academy at the U12 level after impressing during trials and steadily progressed through the ranks. At 14, Njoh joined the Castelmaurou elite training centre.

After three years at Toulouse, Njoh chose to leave the club in search of new opportunities, declining a one-year amateur contract. He signed with US Orléans, where he quickly made an impression during an internal match. This led to his integration into the professional squad by coach Xavier Colin, bypassing the reserve team entirely. Despite a mid-season coaching change with Nicolas Usaï replacing Colin, Njoh continued to progress and made his debut in the Championnat National, the third tier of the French football league system, in February 2023.

In July 2023, Njoh transferred to Pau FC from US Orléans after just one season. He made his professional debut with Pau in a 3–0 Ligue 2 victory against FC Girondins de Bordeaux on 7 August 2023.

Njoh scored his first professional goal at the Stade Armand-Cesari against SC Bastia, helping Pau FC secure a 4–1 victory.

During the summer 2024 pre-season, Njoh excelled as a starter, scoring three goals, including one against his former club Toulouse. With key players like Mons Bassouamina and Moussa Sylla departing, Njoh sees an opportunity to cement his place in the team, aiming to build on the promise he showed during his first season with Pau.

=== Move to Viborg ===
On 3 February 2025, on transfer deadline day, it was confirmed that Njoh joined Danish Superliga side Viborg on a loan agreement until the end of the season, with an option to buy included. The option was exercised on 31 March when the club announced they had signed him on a permanent contract until 2029, which started during the summer transfer window.

In his first start, Njoh scored his first goal for Viborg in a 3–1 victory over Vejle on 2 March. In a match against Sønderjyske on 26 April, he was substituted on in the 70th minute of the match as Viborg trailed 0–2. He went on to score twice within 15 minutes to secure a 2–2 draw for Viborg. His substitute appearance led to him being named to the Superliga team of the week.

== Personal life ==
Born in France, Njoh is of Cameroonian descent and holds both French and Cameroonian nationalities. His older brother, Lilian Njoh, also plays professionally as a defender.
