= Nicolas Bürgy =

Swiss footballer (born 1995)

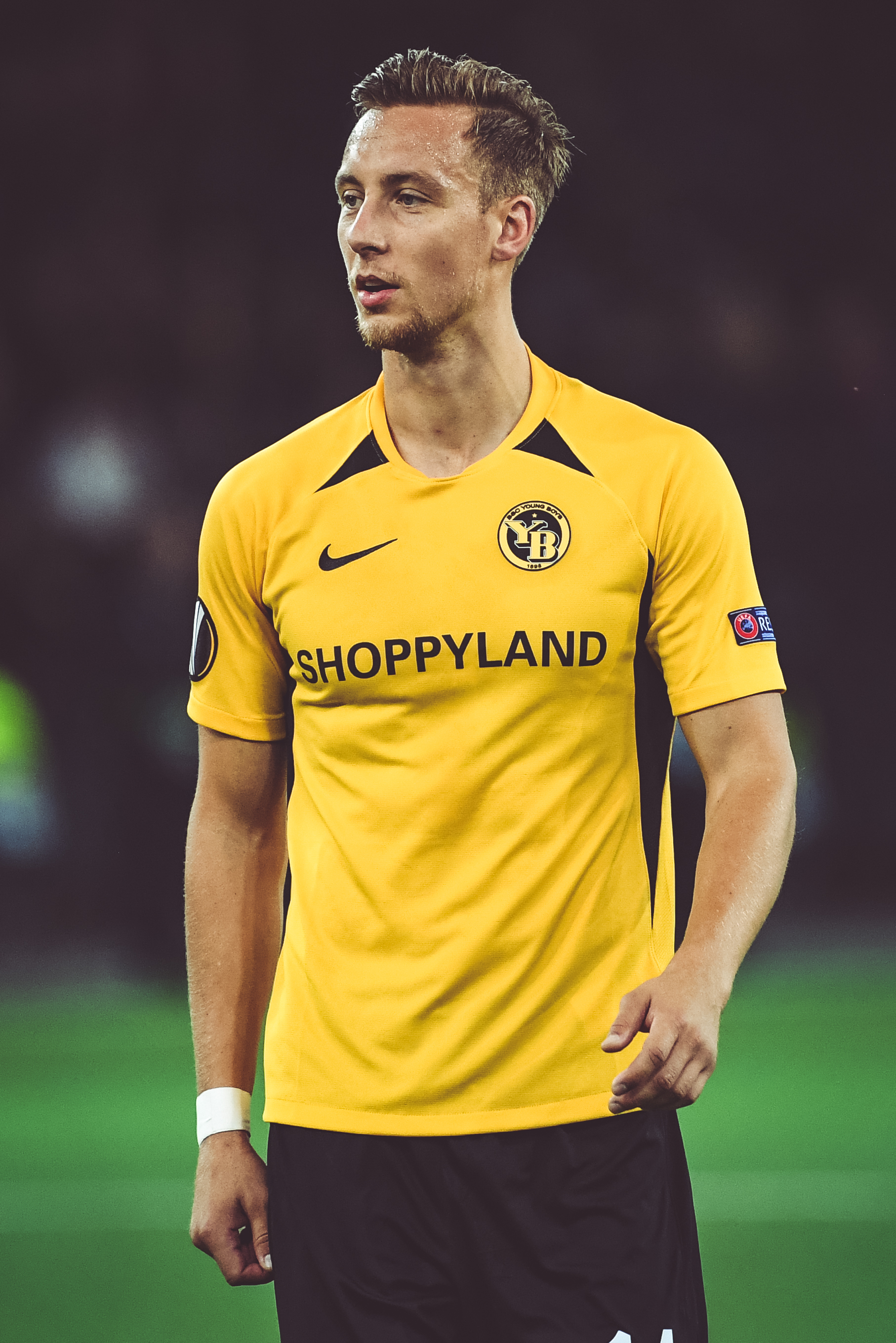
- Bürgy with Young Boys in 2019

Personal information
- Full name: Nicolas Sandro Bürgy
- Date of birth: 7 August 1995 (age 31)
- Place of birth: Belp, Switzerland
- Height: 1.86 m (6 ft 1 in)
- Position: Centre-back

Team information
- Current team: Thun
- Number: 5

Youth career
- FC Belp
- Young Boys

Senior career*
Years	Team	Apps	(Gls)
2015–2022	Young Boys	31	(1)
2015–2016	→ Wohlen (loan)	26	(1)
2017–2018	→ Thun (loan)	32	(1)
2018–2019	→ Aarau (loan)	27	(1)
2021	→ SC Paderborn (loan)	0	(0)
2022	→ Viborg (loan)	15	(2)
2022–2025	Viborg	80	(5)
2025–2026	OB	40	(2)
2026–	Thun	6	(2)
- * Club domestic league appearances and goals as of 28 September 2026

Nicolas Bürgy (born 7 August 1995) is a Swiss professional footballer who plays as a centre-back for Swiss Super League club Thun.

== Club career ==
=== Young Boys ===
He started his career in the youth of local club FC Belp before joining the academy of Young Boys where he signed his first professional contract in 2015.

==== Wolhen (Loan) ====
After that signing his first professional contract with Young Boys he was loaned out to FC Wohlen, a club in the second division (Challenge League). He made his debut in the professional football aged 19 in a local derby against Argovian rivals FC Aarau. He made 26 appearances for Wohlen, scoring one goal.

==== Back to Young Boys ====
He returned to Young Boys in the summer of 2016 and debuted in the top flight (Super League) on 10 September 2016 during a 2–1 victory against FC Luzern. One month earlier he had made his first official appearance for the first team in a cup tie against SC Veltheim.

Bürgy returned to the BSC Young Boys for the 2016–17 season and made his debut on 10 September 2016 in a 2–1 home win over FC Luzern in the Super League. A month earlier he had made his first official appearance for the Young Boys first team in the Swiss Cup against SC Veltheim.

==== FC Thun (loan) ====
In February 2017 he was loaned out to Super League rivals FC Thun. In the Bernese Oberland he made 36 appearances with one goal and two assists. In 2018 he was sidelined for several months due to a violation of the central nervous system.

==== FC Aarau (loan) ====
In September 2018, after his recovery, he moved on loan to second division club FC Aarau for the rest of the season where he made 30 appearances. He scored one goal and provided two assists.

At the end of the season 2018–19 he was voted "Player of the Season" by an expert jury at FC Aarau. The club was bottom of the league with six consecutive losses at the beginning of the season when they signed Bürgy on loan. He quickly became the leading defender and had a major part in the unparalleled race to catch up by the club which qualified for the promotional play-offs at the end of the season.

==== Back to Young Boys ====
He returned to Young Boys for the 2019–20 season and scored his first goal for his hometown club on 19 October 2019 during a 4–1 home victory against Neuchâtel Xamax. One month earlier he had debuted in the UEFA Europa League in an away match at Porto. In January 2020 he renewed his contract with Young Boys until June 2023.

=== Viborg FF ===
On 31 January 2022, Bürgy joined Danish Superliga club Viborg FF on a loan for the rest of the season with an buying option. Bürgy made 15 appearances and scored two goals for Viborg, before the club announced in June 2022, that they had triggered the purchase option and signed Bürgy permanently on a deal until June 2025.

=== OB ===
On 3 February 2025, on transfer deadline day, it was confirmed that Bürgy moved to Danish 1st Division club OB on a deal until June 2027.

=== Back to Thun ===
On 24 June 2026, Bürgy returned to Switzerland to play for FC Thun.

== International career ==
Bürgy has represented Switzerland at under-20 level in two matches against Poland and Germany.

== Honours ==
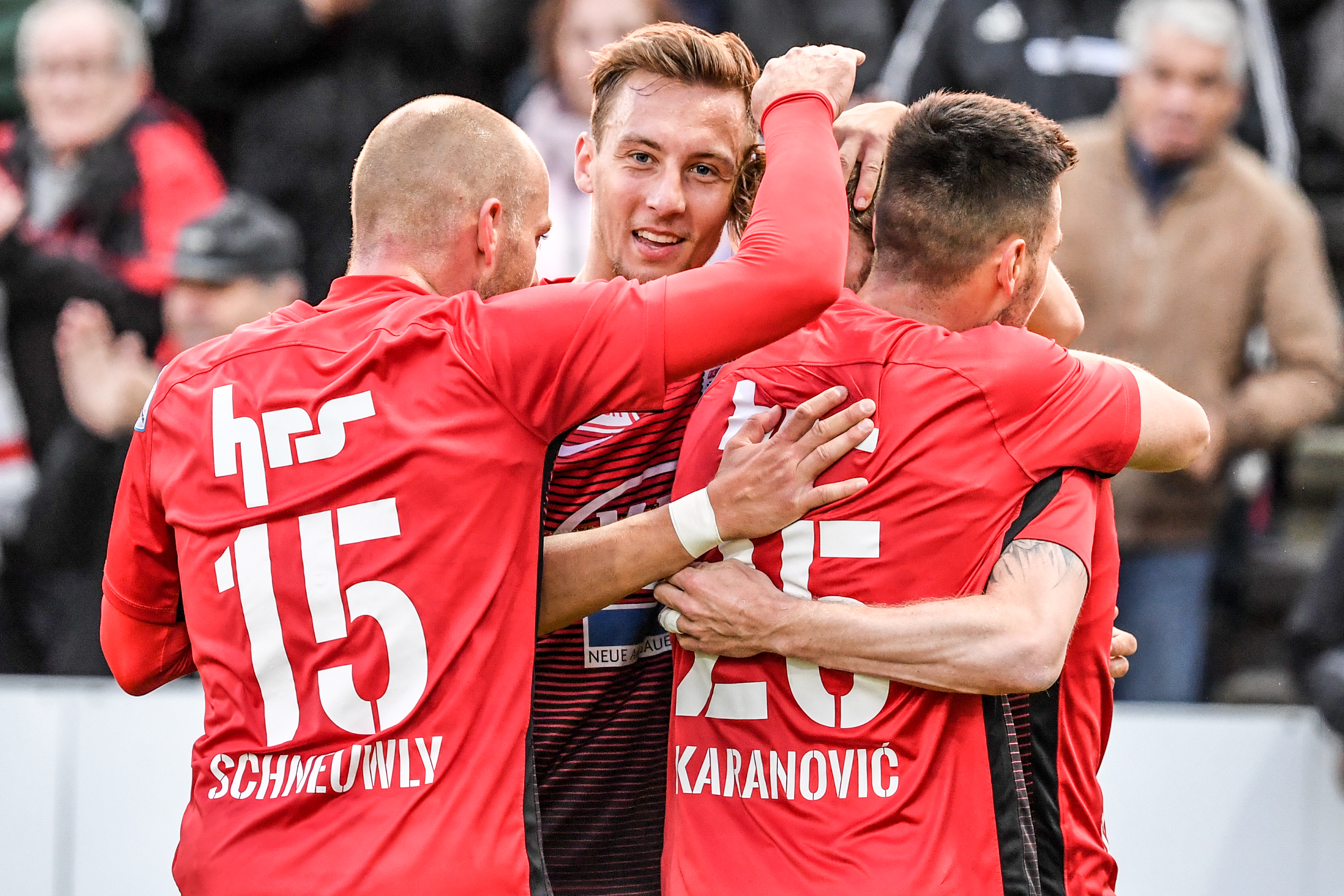
Bürgy celebrating with teammates

Young Boys

- Swiss Super League: 2019–20
- Swiss Cup: 2019–20

OB

- Danish 1st Division: 2024–25

Individual

- FC Aarau Player of the Season: 2018–19
