= 2025–26 Aarhus Gymnastikforening season =

AGF
2025–26 season
- Chairman: Jacob Nielsen
- Manager: Jakob Poulsen
- Stadium: Ceres Park Vejlby (Temporary stadium)
- Danish Superliga: 1st
- Danish Cup: Semi-finals
- Top goalscorer: League: Tobias Bech (12)
- Highest home attendance: 11,573 v Viborg (17 May 2026, Danish Superliga)
- Lowest home attendance: 3,472 v Sønderjyske (29 October 2025, Danish Cup)
- Average home league attendance: 9,244
- Biggest win: 5–1 v OB (Away, 18 August 2025, Danish Superliga); 6–2 v Viborg (Home, 17 May 2026, Danish Superliga)
- Biggest defeat: 1–2 v Randers (Home, 25 July 2025, Danish Superliga); 2–3 v Sønderjyske (Home, 9 November 2025, Danish Superliga); 0–1 v OB (Away, 11 December 2025, Danish Cup); 0–1 v Midtjylland (Home, 12 February 2026, Danish Cup); 1–2 v Midtjylland (Away, 20 April 2026, Danish Superliga)
Home colours	Away colours	Third colours

The 2025–26 season was Aarhus Gymnastikforening's 11th consecutive season in the Danish Superliga and 119th season in existence as a football club. In addition to the domestic league, AFG participated in the Danish Cup.

== Squad ==
Squad at end of season

Note: Flags indicate national team as defined under FIFA eligibility rules; some limited exceptions apply. Players may hold more than one non-FIFA nationality.

No.	Pos.	Nation	Player
1	GK	DEN	Jesper Hansen
3	DF	DEN	Henrik Dalsgaard
4	MF	NOR	Magnus Knudsen
5	DF	DEN	Frederik Tingager
6	MF	DEN	Nicolai Poulsen
7	MF	NOR	Markus Solbakken
8	FW	DEN	Sebastian Jørgensen (on loan from Malmö FF)
9	FW	DEN	Patrick Mortensen (captain)
10	MF	NOR	Kristian Arnstad
11	MF	RSA	Gift Links
13	FW	GER	Janni Serra

No.	Pos.	Nation	Player
14	DF	DEN	Tobias Mølgaard
17	MF	IRQ	Kevin Yakob
19	DF	SWE	Eric Kahl
20	MF	ISL	Tómas Kristjánsson
21	GK	NOR	Mads Hedenstad Christiansen
26	DF	DEN	Jacob Andersen
27	FW	DEN	Stefen Tchamche
29	DF	DEN	Rasmus Carstensen (on loan from 1. FC Köln)
31	FW	DEN	Tobias Bech
39	FW	DEN	Frederik Emmery
40	DF	DEN	Jonas Jensen-Abbew

== Transfers ==
=== Summer ===
In:

No.	Pos.	Nation	Player
8	MF	DEN	Sebastian Jørgensen (on loan from (Sweden) Malmö, previously on loan at (Sweden) Norrköping)
29	DF	DEN	Rasmus Carstensen (on loan from (Germany) 1. FC Köln, previously on loan at (Poland) Lech Poznań)

Out:

No.	Pos.	Nation	Player
8	MF	ISL	Mikael Anderson (to (Sweden) Djurgården)
20	MF	DEN	Mikkel Duelund (to Vejle)
27	MF	GHA	Michael Akoto (to (Iceland) KR Reykjavík)
29	MF	DEN	Frederik Brandhof (to Horsens)
—	DF	DEN	Aksel Halsgaard (on loan to Næstved, previously on loan at Roskilde)
—	FW	GHA	Richmond Gyamfi (on loan to Esbjerg, previously on loan at Hobro)
—	MF	DEN	Mathias Sauer (to (Norway) Egersund, previously on loan)
—	FW	NOR	Sigurd Haugen (to (Germany) 1860 Munich, previously on loan at (Germany) Hansa Rostock)

=== Winter ===
In:

No.	Pos.	Nation	Player
4	MF	NOR	Magnus Knudsen (from (Germany) Holstein Kiel)
21	GK	NOR	Mads Hedenstad Christiansen (from (Norway) Lillestrøm)

Out:

No.	Pos.	Nation	Player
15	FW	SEN	Youssouph Badji (on loan to (Greece) Panetolikos)
22	GK	SWE	Leopold Wahlstedt (to (Norway) Rosenborg)
32	GK	DEN	Jonathan Hutters (to Middelfart)
—	DF	DEN	Aksel Halsgaard (to Næstved, previously on loan)

== Competitions ==
=== Overview ===
Competition	First match	Last match	Starting round	Final position	Record							
Competition	First match	Last match	Starting round	Final position	Pld	W	D	L	GF	GA	GD	Win %
Danish Superliga	20 July 2025	17 May 2026	Matchday 1	Winners	32	19	10	3	62	32	+30	59.38
Danish Cup	24 September 2025	8 March 2026	Third round	Semi-finals	6	3	1	2	8	6	+2	50.00
Total					38	22	11	5	70	38	+32	57.89

Source: Competitions

=== Danish Superliga ===
==== Regular season ====
===== League table =====
Pos	Team	Pld	W	D	L	GF	GA	GD	Pts	Qualification
1	AGF	22	15	5	2	46	23	+23	50	Qualification for the Championship round
2	Midtjylland	22	13	7	2	58	23	+35	46	Qualification for the Championship round
3	Sønderjyske	22	10	6	6	34	28	+6	36	Qualification for the Championship round
4	Brøndby	22	10	4	8	31	22	+9	34	Qualification for the Championship round
5	Viborg	22	10	3	9	37	35	+2	33	Qualification for the Championship round

Source: Danish Football Association (in Danish), Soccerway
Rules for classification: 1) Points; 2) Goal difference; 3) Goals scored; 4) Away goals scored; 5) Play-off (played on neutral ground if determining teams for different rounds); 6) Draw.

===== Results summary =====
Overall								Home						Away					
Pld	W	D	L	GF	GA	GD	Pts	W	D	L	GF	GA	GD	W	D	L	GF	GA	GD
22	15	5	2	46	23	+23	50	8	1	2	22	10	+12	7	4	0	24	13	+11

Source: Soccerway

===== Results by round =====
Round	1	2	3	4	5	6	7	8	9	10	11	12	13	14	15	16	17	18	19	20	21	22
Ground	A	H	H	A	A	H	H	A	H	A	H	A	H	A	H	A	H	A	H	A	H	A
Result	D	L	D	W	W	W	W	W	W	W	W	D	W	D	L	W	W	W	W	D	W	W
Position	6	8	11	7	4	4	3	1	1	1	1	1	1	1	3	1	1	1	1	1	1	1
Points	1	1	2	5	8	11	14	17	20	23	26	27	30	31	31	34	37	40	43	44	47	50

Source: Worldfootball
A = Away; H = Home; W = Win; D = Draw; L = Loss

==== Matches ====
20 July 2025 1	Sønderjyske	1–1	AGF	Haderslev
16:00 CEST (UTC+2)	Hyseni 53'	Report	Bech 1'; Dalsgaard (yellow card) 66'; N. Poulsen (yellow card) 71'	Stadium: Haderslev Football Stadium; Attendance: 6,175; Referee: L. Graagaard

25 July 2025 2	AGF	1–2	Randers	Aarhus
19:00 CEST (UTC+2)	Mortensen 4', (penalty missed) 45+3', (yellow card) 64'; Arnstad (yellow card) 8'	Report	Campbell 51'; Mahmoud 53'; Björkengren (yellow card) 60'; Storch (yellow card) 90'; Danho (yellow card) 90+1'	Stadium: Ceres Park Vejlby; Attendance: 8,215; Referee: J. Sundberg

3 August 2025 3	AGF	0–0	Midtjylland	Aarhus
16:00 CEST (UTC+2)	Links (yellow card) 55'; Mortensen (penalty missed) 66'	Report	Chilufya (red card) 28'; Osorio (yellow card) 83'; Byskov (yellow card) 90+2'	Stadium: Ceres Park Vejlby; Attendance: 8,432; Referee: S. Putros

8 August 2025 4	Copenhagen	2–3	AGF	Copenhagen
18:00 CEST (UTC+2)	Pereira (yellow card) 63'; Larsson 76'; Cornelius (yellow card) 83'; Mattsson 84' (pen.)	Report	Mortensen 10'; Bech 52'; Links 74', (yellow card) 75'; Arnstad (yellow card) 38'; Beijmo (yellow card) 90+6'; J. Hansen (yellow card) 90+10'	Stadium: Parken Stadium; Attendance: 28,812; Referee: M. Redder

18 August 2025 5	OB	1–5	AGF	Odense
19:00 CEST (UTC+2)	Ejdum (yellow card) 26'; Gomez (yellow card) 36'; Arp 45+4' (pen.), (yellow card) 68'	Report	Bech 21', 24'; Arnstad 57'; Mortensen 66'; Links 71'	Stadium: Nature Energy Park; Attendance: 13,073; Referee: M. Krogh

24 August 2025 6	AGF	1–0	Vejle	Aarhus
18:00 CEST (UTC+2)	Mortensen 7'; Arnstad (yellow card) 41'	Report	Vestergaard (yellow card) 54'; Duelund (yellow card) 68'	Stadium: Ceres Park Vejlby; Attendance: 9,333; Referee: M. Tykgaard

31 August 2025 7	AGF	4–1	Fredericia	Aarhus
14:00 CEST (UTC+2)	Bech 37'; Mortensen 41'; Carstensen 75'; Beijmo 86' (pen.)	Report	Winther (yellow card) 17'; Muçolli 79'	Stadium: Ceres Park Vejlby; Attendance: 9,649; Referee: A. Uslu

14 September 2025 8	Viborg	1–2	AGF	Viborg
14:00 CEST (UTC+2)	T. Jørgensen 18'; Grønning (yellow card) 63'; Mbom (yellow card) 75'	Report	N. Poulsen 14'; Arnstad 26' (pen.), (yellow card) 90+4'; Beijmo (yellow card) 30'; Kahl (yellow card) 72'	Stadium: Energi Viborg Arena; Attendance: 7,655; Referee: S. Funder

21 September 2025 9	AGF	1–0	Brøndby	Aarhus
18:00 CEST (UTC+2)	Bech (yellow card) 15'; Kahl (yellow card) 20'; Arnstad 31' (pen.); Tingager (yellow card) 90+8'	Report	Klaiber (yellow card) 29'; Spierings (yellow card) 61'; Divković (yellow card) 75'; Binks (yellow card) 90+8'	Stadium: Ceres Park Vejlby; Attendance: 10,818; Referee: J. Sundberg

28 September 2025 10	Nordsjælland	1–2	AGF	Farum
18:00 CEST (UTC+2)	Lind (yellow card) 67', (goal) 78'	Report	Solbakken (yellow card) 49', (goal) 83'; Tingager (yellow card) 57'; Arnstad (penalty missed) 70'; Beijmo 81'	Stadium: Right to Dream Park; Attendance: 4,449; Referee: M. Kristoffersen

5 October 2025 11	AGF	3–1	Silkeborg	Aarhus
16:00 CEST (UTC+2)	N. Poulsen (yellow card) 7'; Arnstad 10'; Yakob 27'; Bech 65'	Report	McCowatt 32'; Westh (yellow card) 58'	Stadium: Ceres Park Vejlby; Attendance: 8,849; Referee: J. Hansen

19 October 2025 12	Brøndby	3–3	AGF	Brøndby
16:00 CEST (UTC+2)	Ambæk 20'; Nartey 51'; Divković 69'	Report	Arnstad 68'; Bech 86'; Kahl (yellow card) 89'; Tchamche 90+2'	Stadium: Brøndby Stadium; Attendance: 25,641; Referee: L. Graagaard

24 October 2025 13	AGF	1–0	Nordsjælland	Aarhus
19:00 CEST (UTC+2)	Emmery 89'	Report	Brink (red card) 54'; O. Solbakken (yellow card) 65'	Stadium: Ceres Park Vejlby; Attendance: 8,593; Referee: J. Sundberg

3 November 2025 14	Midtjylland	1–1	AGF	Herning
19:00 CET (UTC+1)	Billing (yellow card) 2'; Franculino (yellow card) 27', (goal) 81'; Erlić (yellow card) 47'; Tullberg (yellow card) 48' (not on pitch); Castillo (yellow card) 40'	Report	Bech 35', (yellow card) 90+1'; Mortensen (yellow card) 58'; Carstensen (yellow card) 66'	Stadium: MCH Arena; Attendance: 11,619; Referee: M. Krogh

9 November 2025 15	AGF	2–3	Sønderjyske	Aarhus
18:00 CET (UTC+1)	Arnstad (yellow card) 7', (goal) 44'; Mortensen 27'	Report	Hoppe 19', (yellow card) 63'; Ingason 59'; Haidara 80'	Stadium: Ceres Park Vejlby; Attendance: 7,386; Referee: A. Uslu

21 November 2025 16	Silkeborg	0–2	AGF	Silkeborg
19:00 CET (UTC+1)		Report	Carstensen 34'; M. Solbakken 79'	Stadium: JYSK Park; Attendance: 6,173; Referee: J. Sundberg

30 November 2025 17	AGF	2–0	Copenhagen	Aarhus
14:00 CET (UTC+1)	Mortensen 8'; Arnstad (yellow card) 53'; N. Poulsen (yellow card) 58'; Carstensen 65'	Report	Elyounoussi (yellow card) 30'; Robert (yellow card) 54'; Pereira (yellow card) 58'; Chatzidiakos (yellow card) 63'	Stadium: Ceres Park Vejlby; Attendance: 10,289; Referee: M. Kristoffersen

7 December 2025 18	Randers	1–2	AGF	Randers
16:00 CET (UTC+1)	Campbell (yellow card) 35'; Seck (yellow card) 37'; Høegh 43'; Björkengren (yellow card) 76'	Report	Bech 14', 20'; Carstensen (yellow card) 90+4'	Stadium: Cepheus Park Randers; Attendance: 7,146; Referee: K. Karlsen

9 February 2026 19	AGF	2–1	OB	Aarhus
21:00 CET (UTC+1)	Arnstad (yellow card) 30'; Dalsgaard (yellow card) 83'; Emmery 86'; Serra 89'	Report	Ganaus 10'; Askou (yellow card) 61'; Zorniger (yellow card) 84' (not on pitch); Paulsen (yellow card) 87'; Bojang (yellow card) 90+2'	Stadium: Ceres Park Vejlby; Attendance: 4,492; Referee: S. Putros

15 February 2026 20	Fredericia	1–1	AGF	Fredericia
14:00 CET (UTC+1)	Johannesen 4'; Crone (yellow card) 57'; Winther (yellow card) 78'; Jessen (yellow card) 86'	Report	Jessen 32' (pen.)	Stadium: Monjasa Park; Attendance: 3,272; Referee: J. Maae

22 February 2026 21	AGF	5–2	Viborg	Aarhus
18:00 CET (UTC+1)	Yakob (yellow card) 18', (goal) 31', 57'; Dalsgaard (yellow card) 53'; Arnstad 60', 64' (pen.); Links 70'	Report	Jalal (yellow card) 44'; Dorian Jr. 55', (yellow card) 90+6'; Addo 90+5'	Stadium: Ceres Park Vejlby; Attendance: 6,558; Referee: L. Graagaard

1 March 2026 22	Vejle	1–2	AGF	Vejle
17:00 CET (UTC+1)	Gundelund (yellow card) 34'; Velkov 61'	Report	Carstensen (yellow card) 43', (goal) 46', 71'	Stadium: Vejle Stadium; Attendance: 6,804; Referee: M. Redder

==== Championship round ====
===== League table =====
Pos	Team	Pld	W	D	L	GF	GA	GD	Pts	
1	AGF (C)	32	19	10	3	62	32	+30	67	Qualification for the Champions League second qualifying round
2	Midtjylland	32	16	12	4	72	36	+36	60	Qualification for the Europa League second qualifying round (Note: The 2025–26 Danish Cup winners (Midtjylland) qualify for the Europa League second qualifying round.)
3	Nordsjælland	32	15	5	12	51	46	+5	50	Qualification for the Conference League second qualifying round
4	Brøndby	32	13	6	13	44	35	+9	45	Qualification for the European play-off match
5	Viborg	32	13	5	14	49	51	−2	44	

Source: Danish Football Association (in Danish), Soccerway
Rules for classification: 1) Points; 2) Goal difference; 3) Goals scored; 4) Away goals scored; 5) Play-off (played on neutral ground if determining teams for different rounds); 6) Draw.
(C) Champions

===== Results summary =====
Overall								Home						Away					
Pld	W	D	L	GF	GA	GD	Pts	W	D	L	GF	GA	GD	W	D	L	GF	GA	GD
10	4	5	1	16	9	+7	17	2	3	0	9	4	+5	2	2	1	7	5	+2

Source: Worldfootball

===== Results by round =====
Round	23	24	25	26	27	28	29	30	31	32
Ground	A	H	A	H	A	A	H	H	A	H
Result	D	D	W	D	L	D	D	W	W	W
Position	1	1	1	1	1	2	2	1	1	1
Points	51	52	55	56	56	57	58	61	64	67

Source: Worldfootball
A = Away; H = Home; W = Win; D = Draw; L = Loss

===== Matches =====
15 March 2026 23	Sønderjyske	1–1	AGF	Haderslev
16:00 CET (UTC+1)	Haidara (yellow card) 49'; Vinderslev (yellow card) 52'; Mag. Jensen 90+3'	Report	Knudsen (yellow card) 22'; Beijmo (yellow card) 39'; Bech 68'; N. Poulsen (yellow card) 89'	Stadium: Haderslev Football Stadium; Attendance: 6,009; Referee: S. Putros

22 March 2026 24	AGF	0–0	Brøndby	Aarhus
18:00 CET (UTC+1)	Links (yellow card) 52'; Bech (yellow card) 75'; Mortensen (yellow card) 86'	Report	Slisz (yellow card) 20'; Köhlert (yellow card) 23'; Sow (yellow card) 45+2'; Mat. Jensen (yellow card) 66'; Binks (yellow card) 84'	Stadium: Ceres Park Vejlby; Attendance: 11,016; Referee: J. Karlsen

6 April 2026 25	Viborg	1–2	AGF	Viborg
18:00 CEST (UTC+2)	Jalal 7', (yellow card) 65'; T. Jørgensen (yellow card) 58'	Report	Serra 14', 41'; Arnstad (yellow card) 36'	Stadium: Energi Viborg Arena; Attendance: 8,134; Referee: J. Sundberg

10 April 2026 26	AGF	1–1	Nordsjælland	Aarhus
19:00 CEST (UTC+2)	Tingager 82'	Report	Lähteenmäki 9'; Sadio (yellow card) 14'; Yirenkyi (yellow card) 36'; Lind (yellow card) 48'; Janssen (yellow card) 66'; Amoako (yellow card) 89'; A. Hansen (yellow card) 90+1'	Stadium: Ceres Park Vejlby; Attendance: 10,620; Referee: M. Redder

20 April 2026 27	Midtjylland	2–1	AGF	Herning
19:00 CEST (UTC+2)	Şimşir (yellow card) 45+1'; Osorio (yellow card) 70'; J. Hansen 83' (o.g.); Emefile 90+3'	Report	Dalsgaard 20'; Beijmo (yellow card) 57'; N. Poulsen (yellow card) 77'	Stadium: MCH Arena; Attendance: 12,032; Referee: S. Putros

23 April 2026 28	Nordsjælland	1–1	AGF	Farum
18:00 CEST (UTC+2)	Amoako (yellow card) 45'; Janssen (yellow card) 71'; Nene 83'	Report	Mortensen 31'	Stadium: Right to Dream Park; Attendance: 6,105; Referee: M. Krogh

26 April 2026 29	AGF	0–0	Midtjylland	Aarhus
20:00 CEST (UTC+2)		Report	Franculino (yellow card) 59'; Gogorza (yellow card) 90+1'; Bech (yellow card) 90+5'	Stadium: Ceres Park Vejlby; Attendance: 11,335; Referee: J. Sundberg

3 May 2026 30	AGF	2–1	Sønderjyske	Aarhus
18:00 CEST (UTC+2)	Bech 52'; Links (yellow card) 54'; Soulas 90+4' (o.g.); Bogere (yellow card) 90+5'	Report	Hyseni 81'	Stadium: Ceres Park Vejlby; Attendance: 10,745; Referee: J. Karlsen

10 May 2026 31	Brøndby	0–2	AGF	Brøndby
18:00 CEST (UTC+2)	Vallys (yellow card) 30'; Fukuda (yellow card) 31'; Slisz (yellow card) 59'; Dennis (yellow card) 90+1'	Report	Dalsgaard 3'; Yakob 26', (yellow card) 90+4'; Kahl (yellow card) 75'	Stadium: Brøndby Stadium; Attendance: 23,322; Referee: M. Redder

17 May 2026 32	AGF	6–2	Viborg	Aarhus
18:00 CEST (UTC+2)	Emmery 1'; Mortensen 27'; Links 35'; Knudsen (yellow card) 45+5'; Beijmo (yellow card) 56'; S. Jørgensen 70'; Kristjánsson 86', 90+4'	Report	T. Jørgensen 34'; Anyembe (yellow card) 54'; Grønning (yellow card) 74'; Kirkegaard 90+1'	Stadium: Ceres Park Vejlby; Attendance: 11,573; Referee: S. Putros

=== Danish Cup ===
24 September 2025 Third round	Hillerød	1–2	AGF	Hillerød
15:00 CEST (UTC+2)	Sulemana (yellow card) 22'; Jalaei 53'; Glindtvad (yellow card) 90+1'	Report	Links 5'; Badji (yellow card) 28'; Beijmo (yellow card) 80'; Tingager 90+2'	Stadium: Hillerød Stadium

29 October 2025 Fourth round	AGF	2–1	Sønderjyske	Aarhus
20:45 CET (UTC+1)	Arnstad 2'; Mortensen 87'	Report	Soulas (yellow card) 40' (yellow-red card) 65'; Mag. Jensen 57'	Stadium: Ceres Park Vejlby; Attendance: 3,472; Referee: M. Redder

11 December 2025 Quarter-finals First leg	OB	1–0	AGF	Odense
19:00 CET (UTC+1)	Arp 59' (pen.); Ouédraogo (yellow card) 78'	Report	Bech (yellow card) 29'	Stadium: Nature Energy Park; Attendance: 7,507; Referee: A. Uslu

14 December 2025 Quarter-finals Second leg	AGF	3–1 (3–2 agg.)	OB	Aarhus
15:00 CET (UTC+1)	Mortensen 13', (yellow card) 78'; Links 45+1'; N. Poulsen (yellow card) 63'; Beijmo 90+2'	Report	Bürgy (yellow card) 48'; Askou (yellow card) 84'; Ganaus 85'; Paulsen (yellow card) 87'; Falk (yellow card) 90'	Stadium: Ceres Park Vejlby; Attendance: 8,383; Referee: M. Tykgaard
Note: AGF won 3–2 on aggregate.

12 February 2026 Semi-finals First leg	AGF	0–1	Midtjylland	Aarhus
19:00 CET (UTC+1)		Report	Lee 62'; Cho (yellow card) 70'; Osorio (yellow card) 70'; Diao (yellow card) 84'; Brumado (yellow card) 90+5'	Stadium: Ceres Park Vejlby; Attendance: 7,804; Referee: J. Karlsen

8 March 2026 Semi-finals Second leg	Midtjylland	1–1 (2–1 agg.)	AGF	Herning
18:00 CET (UTC+1)	Erlić (yellow card) 62'; Brumado 68'; Billing (yellow card) 88'	Report	Bech 58'; Beijmo (yellow card) 86'	Stadium: MCH Arena; Attendance: 11,265; Referee: M. Krogh
Note: Midtjylland won 2–1 on aggregate.
