= 2023–24 Aarhus Gymnastikforening season =

Aarhus Gymnastikforening
2023–24 season
- Chairman: Jacob Nielsen
- Head coach: Uwe Rösler
- Stadium: Aarhus Stadium
- Superliga: 5th
- Danish Cup: Runners-up
- UEFA Europa Conference League: Second qualifying round
- Top goalscorer: League: Patrick Mortensen (13); All: Patrick Mortensen (14)
Home colours	Away colours
- All statistics correct as of 26 May 2024.

The 2023–24 Aarhus Gymnastikforening season was AGF's ninth consecutive season in top division of the Danish football league, the Danish Superliga. Besides the Superliga, the club competed in the Danish Cup and the UEFA Europa Conference League, losing to Belgian side Club Brugge in the second qualifying round. It was the second season with head coach Uwe Rösler.

== Transfers ==
=== In ===
Date	Position	No.	Name	From	Fee	Ref.
21 June 2023	DF	2	(Sweden) Felix Beijmo	(Sweden) Malmö FF	Undisclosed	
26 June 2023	FW	31	(Denmark) Tobias Bech	(Germany) Ingolstadt 04	Undisclosed	
29 June 2023	MF	15	(Norway) Magnus Knudsen	(Russia) Rostov	Loan	
30 June 2023	MF	27	(Germany) Michael Akoto	(Germany) Dynamo Dresden	Free	
4 July 2023	FW	13	(Germany) Janni Serra	(Germany) Arminia Bielefeld	Free	
24 July 2023	GK	45	(Northern Ireland) Bailey Peacock-Farrell	(England) Burnley	Loan	
1 September 2023	DF	3	(Netherlands) Mats Knoester	(Hungary) Ferencváros	Loan	
1 September 2023	DF	3	(Denmark) Julius Beck	(Italy) Spezia	Loan	
5 January 2024	MF	23	(Denmark) Tobias Bach	(Denmark) Fredericia	Undisclosed	
1 February 2024	DF		(Denmark) Jonas Jensen-Abbew	(Denmark) Nordsjælland	Undisclosed	

=== Out ===
Date	Position	Name	To	Fee	Ref.
17 July 2023	FW	(Denmark) Frederik Ihler	(Sweden) Landskrona BoIS	Undisclosed	
23 August 2023	FW	(Norway) Sigurd Hauso Haugen	(Netherlands) NAC Breda	Loan	
30 August 2023	FW	(Denmark) Adam Daghim	(Austria) Red Bull Salzburg	Undisclosed	
1 September 2023	DF	(Denmark) Thomas Thiesson Kristensen	(Italy) Udinese	Undisclosed	
1 January 2024	MF	(Australia) Zach Duncan	(United States) Memphis 901	Undisclosed	

== Competitions ==
=== Danish Superliga ===
==== Regular season ====
Pos	Team	Pld	W	D	L	GF	GA	GD	Pts	Qualification
3	Copenhagen	22	14	3	5	45	23	+22	45	Qualification for the Championship round
4	Nordsjælland	22	10	7	5	35	21	+14	37	Qualification for the Championship round
5	AGF	22	9	9	4	26	21	+5	36	Qualification for the Championship round
6	Silkeborg	22	8	3	11	28	32	−4	27	Qualification for the Championship round
7	OB	22	6	6	10	25	32	−7	24	Qualification for the Relegation round

Source: Danish Football Association (in Danish), Soccerway
Rules for classification: 1) Points; 2) Goal difference; 3) Goals scored; 4) Away goals scored; 5) Play-off (played on neutral ground if determining teams for different rounds); 6) Draw.

==== Superliga results summary ====
Overall								Home						Away					
Pld	W	D	L	GF	GA	GD	Pts	W	D	L	GF	GA	GD	W	D	L	GF	GA	GD
17	7	7	3	21	17	+4	28	4	2	2	10	10	0	3	5	1	11	7	+4

Last updated: 3 December 2023.
Source: Superstats

==== Results by round – Regular season ====
Matchday	1	2	3	4	5	6	7	8	9	10	11	12	13	14	15	16	17	18	19	20	21	22
Ground	H	H	A	H	A	H	A	H	A	A	H	A	H	A	H	A	A	A	H	H	A	H
Result	W	L	W	D	D	W	D	L	D	L	D	W	W	D	W	D	W					
Position	4	6	3	4	5	4	5	5	6	7	7	6	6	6	6	6	4					

Updated to match(es) played on 4 December 2023. Source: FBREF
A = Away; H = Home; W = Win; D = Draw; L = Loss

==== Matches ====
23 July 2023 1	AGF	1–0	Vejle	Aarhus
14:00 CEST	Bech 23'	Report		Stadium: Aarhus Stadium; Attendance: 12,215; Referee: Jonas Hansen

31 July 2023 2	AGF	1–3	Nordsjælland	Aarhus
19:00 CEST	Poulsen 41'	Report	Nygren 35'; Osman 51'; Ingvartsen 86'	Stadium: Aarhus Stadium; Attendance: 9,774; Referee: Peter Kjærsgaard-Andersen

6 August 2023 3	Hvidovre IF	0–2	AGF	Hvidovre
14:00 CEST	Mortensen 25'; Knudsen 75'	Report		Stadium: Hvidovre Stadium; Attendance: 5,771; Referee: Jørgen Burchardt

13 August 2023 4	AGF	2–2	Silkeborg IF	Aarhus
18:00 CEST	Mortensen 43'; Anderson 90+12'	Report	Lind 90+1'; Tengstedt 90+4'	Stadium: Aarhus Stadium; Attendance: 10,773; Referee: Jens Maae

20 August 2023 5	Odense	1–1	AGF	Odense
20:00 CEST	Manneh (yellow card) 26'; Mickelson 38'; Al Hajj (yellow card) 84'	Report	Mortensen 2'; Bech (yellow card) 39'; Knudsen (yellow card) 52'; Beijmo (yellow card) 64'	Stadium: Odense Stadium; Attendance: 9,577; Referee: Aydın Uslu

27 August 2023 6	AGF	1–0	Lyngby	Aarhus
14:00 CEST	Mortensen 6'	Report		Stadium: Aarhus Stadium; Attendance: 13,367; Referee: Jakob Karlsen

3 September 2023 7	Midtjylland	1–1	AGF	Herning
20:00 CEST	Brynhildsen 26' (Cho Gue-sung); Lössl (yellow card) 60'; Martínez (yellow card) 80'; Paulinho (yellow card) 85'	FCM Summary	Knudsen (yellow card) 27'; Bech 83' (Mortensen) (yellow card) 90+5'; Poulsen (yellow card) 85'	Stadium: MCH Arena; Attendance: 8,027; Referee: Peter Kjærsgaard-Andersen

17 September 2023 8	AGF	0–3	Brøndby	Aarhus
18:00 CEST	Peacock-Farrell (red card) 23'; Poulsen (yellow card) 51'; Anderson (yellow card) 64'	Summary	Wass 25' (pen.), (yellow card) 28'; Omoijuanfo 40' (Radošević); Alves (yellow card) 45+3'; Vallys 52' (Kvistgaarden)	Stadium: Aarhus Stadium; Attendance: 18,386; Referee: Mikkel Redder

24 September 2023 9	Randers	1–1	AGF	Randers
16:00 CEST	Odey 34'	Report	Mortensen 89'	Stadium: Randers Stadium; Attendance: 8,066; Referee: Jørgen Burchardt

1 October 2023 10	Viborg	2–1	AGF	Viborg
18:00 CEST	Jensen 35'; Kuzmić 72'	Report	Tingager 59'	Stadium: Viborg Stadium; Attendance: 7,244; Referee: Jakob Karlsen

8 October 2023 11	AGF	1–1	Copenhagen	Aarhus
20:00 CEST	Knoester (yellow card) 32'; Serra 73' (Mortensen); Kahl (yellow card) 75'; Mortensen (yellow card) 78'	Report	Kevin Diks (yellow card) 83' (yellow-red card) 90+5'; Falk 90+3'	Stadium: Ceres Park; Attendance: 15,018; Referee: Jakob A. Sundberg

22 October 2023 12	Lyngby	0–2	AGF	Lyngby
14:00 CET		Report	Bech 36', 51'	Stadium: Lyngby Stadium; Attendance: 7,625; Referee: Mads-Kristoffer Kristoffersen

30 October 2023 13	AGF	2–1	Randers	Aarhus
19:00 CET	Serra 27'; Bech 85'	Report	Bundgaard 35'	Stadium: Aarhus Stadium; Attendance: 12,783; Referee: Peter Kjærsgaard-Andersen

6 November 2023 14	Brøndby	1–1	AGF	Brøndbyvester
19:00 CET	Vallys 8' (Wass); Kvistgaarden (yellow card) 16'; Alves (yellow card) 47'	Summary	Mortensen 66' (Beijmo); Andersen (yellow card) 47'	Stadium: Brøndby Stadium; Attendance: 21,063; Referee: Jakob Sundberg

12 November 2023 15	AGF	2–0	Viborg	Aarhus
20:00 CET	Mortensen 46'; Bech 77'	Report		Stadium: Aarhus Stadium; Attendance: 8,856; Referee: Jørgen Burchardt

26 November 2023 16	Nordsjælland	0–0	AGF	Farum
14:00 CET		Report		Stadium: 4,043; Attendance: Right to Dream Park; Referee: Aydin Uslu

3 December 2023 17	Copenhagen	1–2	AGF	Copenhagen
18:00 CET	Boilesen (yellow card) 48'; Achouri 58'; Sørensen (yellow card) 59'	Report	Poulsen (yellow card) 1' (goal) 8' (Brandhof); Tingager 34' (Links); Kahl (yellow card) 44'; Brandhof (yellow card) 80'; Hansen (yellow card) 90+4'	Stadium: Parken Stadium; Attendance: 24,675; Referee: Sandi Putros

19 February 2024 18	Vejle	v	AGF	Vejle
19:00 CET				Attendance: Vejle Stadium

25 February 2024 19	AGF	v	Midtjylland	Aarhus
18:00 CET				Stadium: Aarhus Stadium

3 March 2024 20	AGF	v	Odense	Aarhus
18:00 CET				Stadium: Aarhus Stadium

10 March 2024 21	Silkeborg IF	v	AGF	Silkeborg
14:00 CET				Stadium: Silkeborg Stadium

17 March 2024 22	AGF	v	Hvidovre IF	Aarhus
17:00 CET				Stadium: Aarhus Stadium

=== Danish Cup ===
28 September 2023 Third round	Nykøbing FC	0–1	AGF	Nykøbing Falster Idrætspark
19:00	Pank (yellow card) 59'; Vendelbo (yellow card) 87'		Kahl (yellow card) 56'; Beijmo 64'; Mølgaard (yellow card) 70'	Referee: Simon Rasmussen

2 November 2023 Round of 16	Ishøj	0–4	AGF	Ishøj Idrætscenter
18:00	Sahin (yellow card) 12'		Anderson (yellow card) 40' (goal) 73' (Mortensen); Beijmo 46'; Bjur (yellow card) 63'; Sauer 72' (Andersen) 90' (Anderson)	Referee: Lasse Label Graagaard

7 December 2023 Quarter-finals first leg	AGF	2–0	Brøndby	Aarhus
	Serra 42'; Poulsen (yellow card) 45+4'; Tingager 65' (Links)		Wass (yellow card) 55'	Stadium: Aarhus Stadium; Attendance: 9,869; Referee: Peter Kjærsgaard-Andersen

10 December 2023 Quarter-finals second leg	Brøndby	2–1 (2–3 agg.)	AGF	Brøndbyvester
	Suzuki (yellow card) 18'; Kvistgaarden 25' (Wass) 43' (Divković); Sebulonsen (yellow card) 48'; Divković (yellow card) 73'		Mortensen 49' (yellow card) 71'	Stadium: Brøndby Stadium; Referee: Morten Krogh

29 March 2024 Semi-finals first leg	Nordsjælland	2-3	AGF	Farum
18:00	Osman 44'; Schjelderup 61'	Report	Links 33'; Bech 45+2'; Tingager 79'	Stadium: Right to Dream Park; Referee: Jens Maae

10 April 2024 Semi-finals second leg	AGF	1–0 (4–2 agg.)	Nordsjælland	Aarhus
20:00	Links 90+2'	Report		Stadium: Aarhus Stadium; Referee: Morten Krogh

9 May 2024 Finals	Silkeborg	1–0	AGF	Copenhagen
17:00	Sonne 38'			Stadium: Parken; Attendance: 36,300; Referee: Mikkel Redder

=== UEFA Europa Conference League ===
==== Second qualifying round ====
27 July 2023 First leg	Club Brugge (Belgium)	3–0	(Denmark) AGF	Jan Breydel Stadium, Bruges
20:00	Buchanan 10'; Rits 48'; Vetlesen 76'	Report		Attendance: 18,925; Referee: Goga Kikacheishvili (Georgia)

3 August 2023 Second leg	AGF (Denmark)	1–0 (1–3 agg.)	(Belgium) Club Brugge	Aarhus Stadium, Aarhus
20:00	Beijmo 3'	Report		Attendance: 12,651; Referee: Atilla Karaoğlan (Turkey)

== Statistics ==
=== Goals ===
As of 10 December 2023

Rank	No.	Nat.	Pos.	Player	Superliga	Danish Cup	Conference League	Total
1	9	(Denmark)	FW	Patrick Mortensen	7	1	0	8
2	31	(Denmark)	FW	Tobias Bech	6	0	0	6
3	2	(Sweden)	DF	Felix Beijmo	0	2	1	3
3	5	(Denmark)	DF	Frederik Tingager	2	1	0	3
3	13	(Germany)	FW	Janni Serra	2	1	0	3
6	6	(Denmark)	MF	Nicolai Poulsen	2	0	0	2
6	8	(Iceland)	MF	Mikael Anderson	1	1	0	2
6	30	(Denmark)	MF	Mathias Sauer	0	2	0	2
9	15	(Norway)	MF	Magnus Knudsen	1	0	0	1
Own goals					0	0	0	0
Totals					21	8	1	30
