= 2024–25 Aarhus Gymnastikforening season =

Aarhus Gymnastikforening
2024–25 season
- Manager: Jacob Poulsen
- Stadium: Ceres Arena
- Danish Superliga: 3rd
- Danish Cup: Quarter-finals
- Top goalscorer: League: Patrick Mortensen (12); All: Patrick Mortensen (13)

The 2024–25 season is the 123rd season in the history of Aarhus Gymnastikforening as a football club, and the club's 10th consecutive season in the Danish Superliga. In addition to the domestic league, the team participated in the Danish Cup.

== Transfers ==
=== In ===
Pos.	Player	Transferred to	Fee	Date	Source
DF	(Denmark) Aksel Halsgaard	(Denmark) FC Copenhagen U19	Free	1 July 2024	
FW	(Ghana) Richmond Gyamfi	(Denmark) Hobro IK	Undisclosed	10 July 2024	

=== Out ===
Pos.	Player	Transferred to	Fee	Date	Source
MF	(Denmark) Benjamin Hvidt	(Denmark) Esbjerg fB	Undisclosed	1 July 2024	
DF	(Australia) Diesel Herrington	(Australia) Central Coast Mariners		1 July 2024	
FW	(Germany) Janni Serra	(Germany) 1. FC Nürnberg	Loan	26 July 2024	

== Friendlies ==
22 June 2024 Friendly	Brabrand IF (Denmark)	0–0	(Denmark) AGF
11:00 UTC+2

4 July 2024 Friendly	Midtjylland (Denmark)	4–0	(Denmark) AGF
13:00 UTC+2
Note: Four periods of 30 minutes

10 October 2024 Friendly	Hamburg (Germany)	1–1	(Denmark) AGF	Hamburg
12:15 CET	Jatta 60'	Report	Duelund (yellow card) 5'; Bech (yellow card) 20'; Mortensen 70'	Stadium: HSV-Trainingsgelände Platz 2

16 January 2025 Friendly	AGF (Denmark)	4–1	(Denmark) OB	Aarhus
13:00 CET	Bech 34'; Andersen 40'; Beijmo 48'; Duelund 76'	Report	Kjerrumgaard 25'	Stadium: Ceres Park

21 January 2025 Friendly	AGF (Denmark)	4–0	(Czech Republic) Pardubice	Marbella
16:00 CET	Tingager 6'; Sauer 54'; Power 90+1'; Arnstad 90+3'	Report		Stadium: Estadio Municipal de Marbella

26 January 2025 Friendly	AGF (Denmark)	2–1	(United States) Philadelphia Union	Estepona
16:00 CET	Duelund 67'; Frej Elkjaer 78'	Report	Sullivan 26'	Stadium: Complejo Deportivo Arroyo Enmedio

1 February 2025 Friendly	AGF (Denmark)	1–0	(Sweden) AIK	Marbella
13:00 CET	Mortensen 15'	Report		Stadium: Banús Football Center

8 February 2025 Friendly	AGF (Denmark)	4–3	(Denmark) Copenhagen	Aarhus
14:00 CET	Anderson 55' 59'; Mortensen 87'; Poulsen 90+3'	Report	Chiakha 13'; Robert 22'; Mattsson 29'	Stadium: Ceres Park

== Competitions ==
=== Overall record ===
Competition	First match	Last match	Starting round	Record							
Competition	First match	Last match	Starting round	Pld	W	D	L	GF	GA	GD	Win %
Superliga	19 July 2024		Matchday 1	2	0	1	1	3	4	−1	0.00
Danish Cup				0	0	0	0	0	0	+0	—
Total				2	0	1	1	3	4	−1	0.00

Last updated: 28 July 2024
Source: Soccerway

=== Superliga ===
==== League table ====
Pos	Team	Pld	W	D	L	GF	GA	GD	Pts	Qualification
1	Midtjylland	22	14	3	5	42	27	+15	45	Qualification for the Championship round
2	Copenhagen	22	11	8	3	38	24	+14	41	Qualification for the Championship round
3	AGF	22	9	9	4	42	23	+19	36	Qualification for the Championship round
4	Randers	22	9	8	5	39	28	+11	35	Qualification for the Championship round
5	Nordsjælland	22	10	5	7	39	36	+3	35	Qualification for the Championship round

Source: Danish Football Association (in Danish), Soccerway
Rules for classification: 1) Points; 2) Goal difference; 3) Goals scored; 4) Away goals scored; 5) Play-off (played on neutral ground if determining teams for different rounds); 6) Draw.

Pos	Team	Pld	W	D	L	GF	GA	GD	Pts	
2	Midtjylland	32	19	5	8	64	42	+22	62	Qualification for the UEFA Europa League second qualifying round
3	Brøndby	32	13	12	7	58	46	+12	51	Qualification for the UEFA Conference League second qualifying round
4	Randers	32	13	9	10	57	50	+7	48	Qualification for the European play-off match
5	Nordsjælland	32	13	7	12	53	56	−3	46	
6	AGF	32	10	10	12	53	46	+7	40	

Source: Danish Football Association (in Danish), Soccerway
Rules for classification: 1) Points; 2) Goal difference; 3) Goals scored; 4) Away goals scored; 5) Play-off (played on neutral ground if determining teams for different rounds); 6) Draw.

Pos	Team	Pld	W	D	L	GF	GA	GD	Pts	
1	Silkeborg (O)	32	13	10	9	56	41	+15	49	Qualification for the European play-off match
2	Viborg	32	12	11	9	57	50	+7	47	
3	Sønderjyske	32	10	7	15	47	64	−17	37	
4	Vejle	32	7	7	18	37	64	−27	28	
5	Lyngby (R)	32	5	12	15	26	43	−17	27	Relegation to 1st Division
6	AaB (R)	32	5	9	18	34	67	−33	24	Relegation to 1st Division

Source: Danish Football Association (in Danish), Soccerway
Rules for classification: 1) Points; 2) Goal difference; 3) Goals scored; 4) Away goals scored; 5) Play-off (played on neutral ground if determining teams for different rounds); 6) Draw.
(O) Play-off winners; (R) Relegated

==== Results summary ====
Overall								Home						Away					
Pld	W	D	L	GF	GA	GD	Pts	W	D	L	GF	GA	GD	W	D	L	GF	GA	GD
22	9	9	4	42	23	+19	36	6	5	0	26	10	+16	3	4	4	16	13	+3

Last updated: 16 March 2025.
Source: soccerway

==== Results by round ====
Round	1	2	3	4	5	6	7	8	9	10	11	12	13	14	15	16	17	18	19	20	21	22	23	24	25	26	27	28
Ground	H	A	H	A	H	A	H	H	A	H	A	H	A	H	H	A	A	A	H	A	H	A	H	A	H	A	A	H
Result	D	L	W	W	W	W	W	D	D	D	D	W	L	W	D	L	D	W	W	D	D	L						
Position	7	8	7	5	4	3	2	2	2	3	3	3	3	2	1	3	4	3	3	3	3	3						

Updated to match(es) played on 16 March 2025. Source: worldfootball
A = Away; H = Home; W = Win; D = Draw; L = Loss

==== Matches ====
The match schedule was released on 7 June 2024.

19 July 2024 1	AGF	1–1	Midtjylland	Aarhus
18:00	Bech 8'; Mortensen (penalty missed) 41'		Buksa 47'	Stadium: Ceres Arena; Referee: Morten Krogh

28 July 2024 2	Copenhagen	3–2	AGF	Copenhagen
18:00				Stadium: Parken Stadium

2 August 2024 3	AGF	4–0	Sønderjyske	Aarhus
19:00	Brandhof (yellow card) 34'; Mortensen 35' 49'; Bech 45+5'; Madsen 56'	Report	Björklund (yellow card) 45+1'; Oggesen (yellow card) 81'	Stadium: Ceres Arena; Attendance: 11,218; Referee: (Denmark) Jørgen Burchardt

11 August 2024 4	Brøndby	0–1	AGF	Brøndbyvester
16:00 CET	Klaiber (yellow card) 28'; Rasmussen (yellow card) 90+6'	Report	Mortensen 71'	Stadium: Brøndby Stadium; Attendance: 20,976; Referee: (Denmark) Jacob Karlsen

19 August 2024 5	AGF	5–1	Vejle	Aarhus
19:00 CET	Beijmo 6'; Madsen 22'; Links 32'; Anderson 59'; Mortensen 65'	Report	Onugkha 36'	Stadium: Ceres Arena; Attendance: 11,564; Referee: (Denmark) Jonas Hansen

23 August 2024 6	AaB	0–4	AGF	Aalborg
19:00 CET	Diakhité (yellow card) 78'; Jasson (yellow card) 83'	Report	Madsen 16'; Links 20'; Mortensen 38' 85' (pen.); Poulsen (yellow card) 79'	Stadium: Aalborg Portland Park; Attendance: 9,499; Referee: (Denmark) Jens Maae

31 August 2024 7	AGF	4–2	Nordsjælland	Aarhus
16:00 CET	Ingvartsen 10' (o.g.); Kahl (yellow card) 44'; Bech 49' (yellow card) 65'; Anderson 53'; Tingager 89'	Report	Nygren 11'; Egeli 16'; Sertdemir (yellow card) 63'; Dorgeles (yellow card) 65'; Tverskov (yellow card) 76'; Høgsberg (yellow card) 76'	Stadium: Ceres Arena; Attendance: 14,280; Referee: (Denmark) Mads-Kristoffer Kristoffersen

15 September 2024 8	AGF	1–1	Silkeborg	Aarhus
14:00 CET	Poulsen 28' (yellow card) 63'; Madsen (yellow card) 72'; Arnstad (yellow card) 73'	Report	Adamsen 22'; Andersen (yellow card) 75'	Stadium: Ceres Arena; Attendance: 15,627; Referee: (Denmark) Jacob Karlsen

22 September 2024 9	Lyngby	0–0	AGF	Lyngby
16:00 CET	Klassen (yellow card) 39'; Gregor (yellow card) 57'; Magnússon (yellow card) 75'; Rømer (yellow card) 87'	Report	Madsen (yellow card) 45'; Bech (yellow card) 78'	Stadium: Lyngby Stadium; Attendance: 7,115; Referee: (Denmark) Jørgen Burchardt

28 September 2024 10	AGF	2–2	Randers	Aarhus
16:00 CET	Bech 25' (yellow card) 74'; Anderson (yellow card) 63'; Madsen 79'; Beijmo (yellow card) 90+2'; Andersen (yellow card) 90+9'	Report	Danho (yellow card) 4' (goal) 61'; Olsen (yellow card) 24'; Björkengren 44'; Campbell (yellow card) 68'; Dammers (yellow card) 74'; Rømer (yellow card) 90+5'; Nordli (yellow card) 90+9'	Stadium: Ceres Arena; Attendance: 13,280; Referee: (Denmark) Jakob Sundberg

6 October 2024 11	Viborg	1–1	AGF	Viborg
16:00 CET	Westergaard 26'; Lonwijk (yellow card) 74'	Report	Mortensen (yellow card) 54'; Anderson (yellow card) 61'; Bech 68'; Jensen-Abbew (red card) 85'; Poulsen (yellow card) 90+2'	Stadium: Energi Viborg Arena; Attendance: 8,351; Referee: (Denmark) Mikkel Redder

21 October 2024 12	AGF	1–0	Brøndby	Aarhus
19:00 CET	Mortensen 32' (pen.); Poulsen (yellow card) 69'; Beijmo (yellow card) 88' (yellow-red card) 90+7'	Report	Bischoff (yellow card) 30'; Spierings (yellow card) 39'; Kvistgaarden (yellow card) 90+5'	Stadium: Ceres Arena; Attendance: 15,736; Referee: (Denmark) Morten Krogh Hansen

27 October 2024 13	Midtjylland	2–0	AGF	Herning
18:00 CET	Mbabu 34' (yellow card) 86'; Djú 90' (yellow card) 90+1'	Report	Links (yellow card) 50'	Stadium: MCH Arena; Attendance: 11,161; Referee: (Denmark) Michael Tykgaard

3 November 2024 14	AGF	2–1	Lyngby	Aarhus
16:00 CET	Gregor 34' (o.g.); Andersen (yellow card) 90+1'; Mortensen 90+5'	Report	Magnússon (yellow card) 24'; Rømer (yellow card) 29'; Jensen (yellow card) 32'; Gytkjær 88'; Klassen (yellow card) 90' (yellow-red card) 90+5'; Abubakari (yellow card) 90+1'; Storch (yellow card) 90+5'	Stadium: Ceres Arena; Attendance: 10,838; Referee: (Denmark) Jacob Karlsen

10 November 2024 15	AGF	1–1	Copenhagen	Aarhus
18:00 CET	Dalsgaard 47'; Madsen (yellow card) 62'	Report	Chatzidiakos 2'; Delaney (yellow card) 80'	Stadium: Ceres Arena; Attendance: 15,894; Referee: (Denmark) Jens Maae

22 November 2024 16	Nordsjælland	1–0	AGF	Farum
19:00 CET	Iloski 90+2'; Ankersen (yellow card) 90+7'	Report		Stadium: Right to Dream Park; Attendance: 4,016; Referee: (Denmark) Aydin Uslu

1 December 2024 17	Silkeborg	1–1	AGF	Silkeborg
18:00 CET	Mattsson (yellow card) 23'; Sonne 70' (yellow card) 73'; Freundlich (yellow card) 81'	Report	Mortensen 82' (pen.); Kahl (yellow card) 90+1'; Power (yellow card) 90+4'	Stadium: JYSK Park; Attendance: 6,859; Referee: (Denmark) Lasse Graagaard

=== Danish Cup ===
25 September 2024 Third round	VSK Aarhus	0–2	AGF	Aarhus
17:00 CET	Peter Némec (yellow card) 13'; Oscar Jacobsen (yellow card) 32'; Kasper Green-Pedersen (yellow card) 82'; Frederik Søvndahl (yellow card) 88'	Report	Tingager 37'; Badji 82' (pen.) (yellow card) 90'	Stadium: Aarhus Stadium; Attendance: 3,392; Referee: Jens Maae

7 November 2024 Fourth round	Skive	2–3 (a.e.t.)	AGF	Skive
18:30 CET	Huldahl (yellow card) 16' (goal) 87' (pen.); Marco Vesterholm 23'; Oliver Østergaard (yellow card) 50'; Zifarlino Nsoni (yellow card) 70'	Report	Badji 52'; Andersen (yellow card) 68'; Madsen 90+4'; Links 104'; Arnstad (yellow card) 105+3'	Stadium: Skive Stadium; Attendance: 3,493; Referee: Jørgen Burchardt

8 December 2024 Quarter-finals first leg	AGF	1–0	Brøndby	Aarhus
18:30 CET	Beijmo (yellow card) 37'; Links 74'; Arnstad (yellow card) 78'	Report	Rasmussen (yellow card) 36'; Nartey (yellow card) 78'	Stadium: Aarhus Stadium; Attendance: 8,919; Referee: Mads-Kristoffer Kristoffersen

15 December 2024 Quarter-finals second leg	Brøndby	4–2 (4–3 agg.)	AGF	Brøndby
19:00 CET	Wass 11' (pen.); Kvistgaarden 30'; Vallys 57'; Nartey 77'; Spierings (yellow card) 83' (yellow-red card) 83'	Report	Tingager (yellow card) 10'; Mortensen 80' (yellow card) 89'; Links (yellow card) 83'; Duelund 85'; Madsen (yellow card) 85'	Stadium: Brøndby Stadium; Attendance: 13,096; Referee: Jakob Alexander Sundberg
