= Frederik Emmery =

Danish footballer (born 2006)

Personal information
- Full name: Frederik Emmery Søgaard
- Date of birth: 25 December 2006 (age 19)
- Place of birth: Aarhus, Denmark
- Height: 1.78 m (5 ft 10 in)
- Position: Winger

Team information
- Current team: AGF
- Number: 29

Youth career
- 2013–2016: Skødstrup SF
- 2016–2018: HEI Fodbold
- 2018–2024: AGF

Senior career*
Years	Team	Apps	(Gls)
2024–	AGF	31	(2)

International career^{‡}
2025–	Denmark U19	2	(0)
- * Club domestic league appearances and goals as of 18:30, 3 September 2026 (UTC) ‡ National team caps and goals as of 3 September 2026

Frederik Emmery Søgaard (born 10 December 2006) is a Danish professional footballer who plays as a winger for Danish Superliga club AGF.

== Career ==
=== AGF ===
Emmery grew up in Skødstrup, a district of Aarhus, and started playing football in the local club VRI Fodbold (Vejlby-Risskov Idrætsklub). Later, he joined AGF in 2018, where he worked his way up through the clubs' academy.

On 16 May 2024, Emmery was called up for the first team squad for a Danish Superliga match against Silkeborg IF for the first time. He made his official debut in the same match when he replaced Jacob Andersen in the 74th minute, becoming the 10th youngest debutant in AGF's history at 17 years and 143 days. The debut ended up being his only game for the club that season.

In the 2024–25 pre-season, Emmery trained with AGF's first team.

On 30 April 2025, AGF and Emmery extended the contract until summer 2029. He was also permanently promoted to the first-team squad in the summer of 2025.

On 24 October 2025, he scored his first league goal for AGF, in a 1–0 victory against FC Nordsjælland, where he became the match winner with a goal in overtime.

Coaches and teammates point to Emmery's ability to beat experienced Superliga players in 1-v-1 situations, something they thought separated him from many academy talents who succeed only at youth level. He has already been trusted in senior matches, and has delivered goals and decisive actions despite limited time in the game.

In 2026 he won the Danish Championship with the club, the first in 40 years. He was however mostly a back-up during the season.

== Honours ==
AGF

- Danish Superliga: 2025–26
