= Rasmus Carstensen =

Danish footballer (born 2000)

Personal information
- Full name: Rasmus Bjerregaard Carstensen
- Date of birth: 10 November 2000 (age 26)
- Place of birth: Virklund, Denmark
- Height: 1.83 m (6 ft 0 in)
- Position: Right-back

Team information
- Current team: AGF
- Number: 29

Youth career
- –2013: Virklund BK
- 2013–2018: Silkeborg

Senior career*
Years	Team	Apps	(Gls)
2018–2022	Silkeborg	85	(2)
2022–2024	Genk	4	(0)
2022–2024	Jong Genk	9	(0)
2023–2024	→ 1. FC Köln (loan)	23	(0)
2024–2026	1. FC Köln	3	(0)
2025	→ Lech Poznań (loan)	15	(2)
2025–2026	→ AGF (loan)	24	(5)
2026–	AGF	0	(0)

International career
2021	Denmark U20	2	(0)
2020–2022	Denmark U21	17	(0)
- * Club domestic league appearances and goals as of 16:51, 11 May 2026 (UTC)

Rasmus Bjerregaard Carstensen (born 10 November 2000) is a Danish professional footballer who plays as a right-back for Danish Superliga club AGF.

== Club career ==
=== Silkeborg ===
Born in Virklund, 6 kilometres (3.7 mi) south of Silkeborg, Central Jutland, Carstensen initially played youth football at local club Virklund IF, before moving to the Silkeborg IF youth academy at age 13.

After practicing with the first team, he signed a one-year contract on 6 February 2019, and made his debut on 20 March at the age of 19 in a 2–0 away loss to Lyngby Boldklub in the second-tier Danish 1st Division. With Silkeborg, Carstensen won promotion to the top-tier Danish Superliga at the end of the season, where he initially remained on the bench before finally emerging in the starting lineup in the relegation round. However, with Carstensen in the starting lineup, Silkeborg could not prevent relegation back to the 1st Division. After the contract had meanwhile been extended to 2021, he signed another contract extension on 24 July 2020, keeping him part of the club until 2024.

=== Genk ===
On 9 August 2022, it was confirmed that Carstensen had joined Belgian First Division A side Genk on a deal until 2026.

=== Köln ===
On 3 August 2023, Carstensen moved to Bundesliga club 1. FC Köln on a season-long loan. He later joined the club permanently.

==== Loan to Lech Poznań ====
On 16 January 2024, Carstensen was sent on loan to Ekstraklasa club Lech Poznań for the remainder of the season. On 24 May 2025, in a title-deciding match against Piast Gliwice, he provided the assist to Afonso Sousa, who scored in the 39th minute to give Lech their ninth league title.

=== AGF ===
On 7 July 2025, Carstensen returned to Denmark, joining AGF on a season-long loan with an option to buy. During his loan, he won the Danish Championship with the club, the first in 40 years.

On 8 July 2026, Carstensen joined AGF on a permanent basis and signed a four-year contract.

== International career ==
On 4 September 2020, Carstensen made his debut for the Denmark under-21 team in a 1–1 draw in the 2021 UEFA European Under-21 Championship qualifier against Ukraine in Aalborg.

== Career statistics ==
As of match played 22 March 2026

Appearances and goals by club, season and competition
Club	Season	League			National cup (Note: Includes Danish Cup, Belgian Cup, DFB-Pokal)		Europe		Other		Total	
Club	Season	Division	Apps	Goals	Apps	Goals	Apps	Goals	Apps	Goals	Apps	Goals
Silkeborg	2018–19	Danish 1st Division	7	0	0	0	—		—		7	0
Silkeborg	2019–20	Danish Superliga	14	1	2	0	—		—		16	1
Silkeborg	2020–21	Danish 1st Division	30	0	0	0	—		—		30	0
Silkeborg	2021–22	Danish Superliga	31	1	1	0	—		—		32	1
Silkeborg	2022–23	Danish Superliga	3	0	0	0	—		—		3	0
Silkeborg	Total		85	2	3	0	—		—		88	2
Genk	2022–23	Belgian Pro League	4	0	0	0	0	0	—		4	0
Jong Genk	2022–23	Challenger Pro League	9	0	—		—		—		9	0
1. FC Köln (loan)	2023–24	Bundesliga	23	0	1	0	—		—		24	0
1. FC Köln	2024–25	2. Bundesliga	3	0	1	0	—		—		4	0
1. FC Köln	Total		26	0	2	0	—		—		28	0
Lech Poznań (loan)	2024–25	Ekstraklasa	15	2	—		—		—		15	2
AGF (loan)	2025–26	Danish Superliga	24	5	6	0	—		—		30	5
Career total			163	9	11	0	0	0	0	0	174	9

== Honours ==
Silkeborg

- Danish 1st Division: 2018–19

Lech Poznań

- Ekstraklasa: 2024–25

AGF

- Danish Superliga: 2025–26
