= Tómas Kristjánsson =

Icelandic footballer (born 2008)

Personal information
- Full name: Tómas Óli Kristjánsson
- Date of birth: 27 February 2008 (age 18)
- Place of birth: Iceland
- Height: 1.73 m (5 ft 8 in)
- Position: Left winger

Team information
- Current team: AGF
- Number: 20

Youth career
- –2024: Stjarnan
- 2024–2025: AGF

Senior career*
Years	Team	Apps	(Gls)
2025–	AGF	10	(2)

International career^{‡}
2022	Iceland U15	5	(2)
2023–2024	Iceland U16	4	(2)
2023–2025	Iceland U17	12	(4)
2025–	Iceland U19	10	(1)
- * Club domestic league appearances and goals as of 19:20, 17 May 2026 (UTC) ‡ National team caps and goals as of 31 March 2026

Tómas Óli Kristjánsson (born 27 February 2008) is an Icelandic professional footballer who plays as a left winger for Danish Superliga club AGF.

== Club career ==
On 4 March 2024, Tómas signed for AGF on a three year-contract, having previously trialed with the Danish club several times for the preceding two years. He chose AGF ahead of European giants like Benfica and Real Sociedad. 18 months later he was promoted to the senior team after strong performances with the club's U17 and U19 teams. Following his promotion, Tómas made his professional debut as an 88th-minute substitute against Silkeborg IF on 5 October 2025. He made his first professional start on 15 February 2026 in a 1–1 draw against FC Fredericia, being substituted in the 64th minute for Sebastian Jørgensen. On 17 May 2026, the final matchday of the season, Tómas scored his first two professional goals in a 6–2 win against Viborg FF, despite coming on as a substitute only in the 74th minute. In his first professional season he finished with 10 league appearances, scoring 2 goals and being awarded AGF's Young Player of the Year, as the club also won the 2025–26 Danish Superliga, their first league title in 40 years.

== International career ==
Tómas is a youth international for Iceland.

== Personal life ==
Tómas' favorite team growing up was Arsenal, and his idol was Lionel Messi.

== Honours ==
AGF

- Danish Superliga: 2025–26
