= Jonas Jensen-Abbew =

Danish footballer (born 2002)

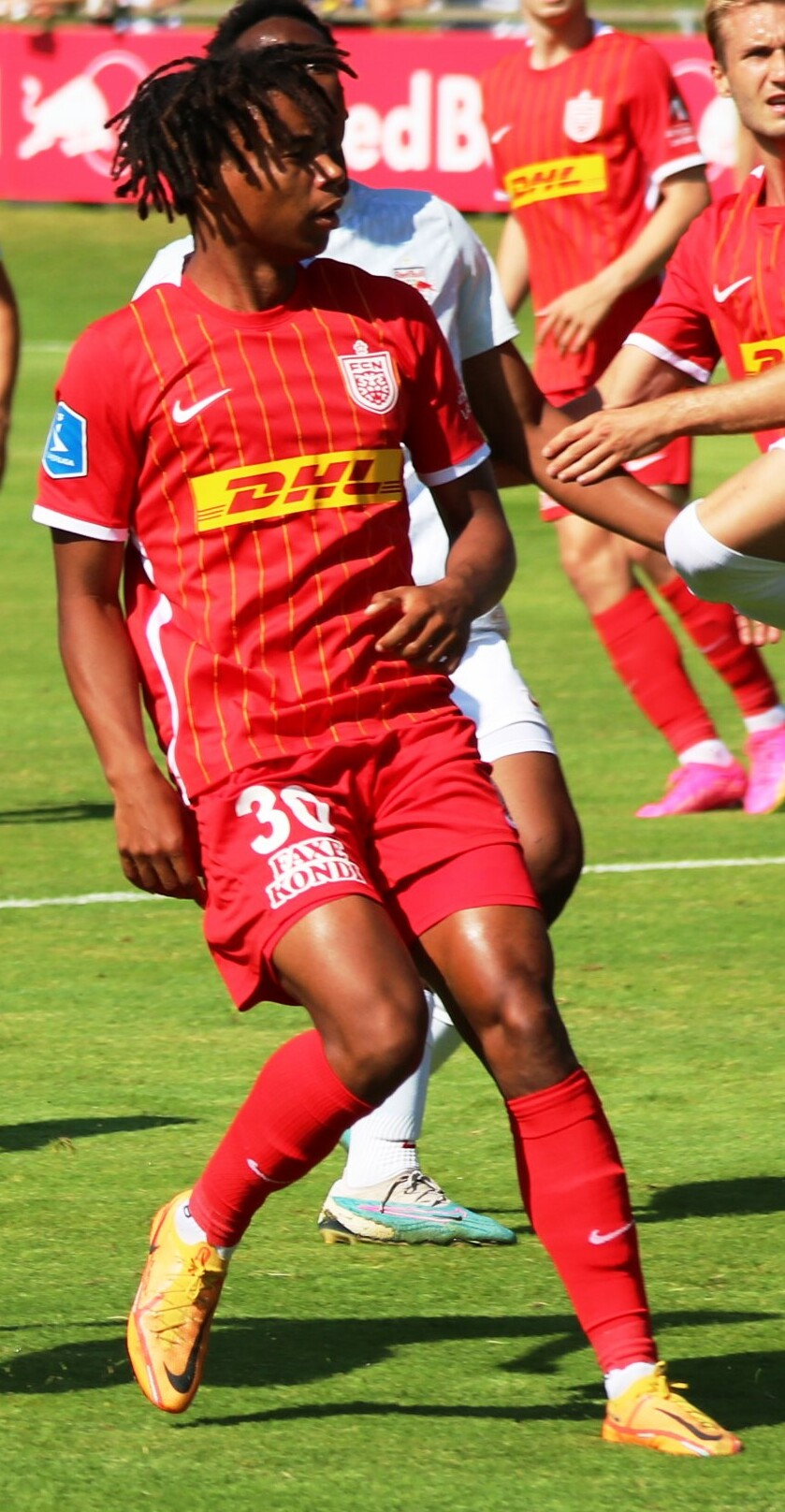
- Jensen-Abbew with Nordsjælland in 2023

Personal information
- Date of birth: 20 April 2002 (age 24)
- Place of birth: Herlev, Denmark
- Height: 1.89 m (6 ft 2 in)
- Position: Centre-back

Team information
- Current team: ADO Den Haag
- Number: 5

Youth career
- B1973
- AB
- 2019–2022: Nordsjælland

Senior career*
Years	Team	Apps	(Gls)
2021–2024	Nordsjælland	18	(0)
2022	→ HB Køge (loan)	13	(0)
2024–2026	AGF	37	(1)
2026–	ADO Den Haag	6	(0)

International career
2019–2020	Denmark U18	6	(0)
2023–2024	Denmark U21	2	(0)
- * Club domestic league appearances and goals as of 23:03, 24 October 2026 (UTC)

Jonas Jensen-Abbew (born 20 April 2002), also known as AJ, is a Danish professional footballer who plays as a centre-back for Eredivisie club ADO Den Haag.

== Club career ==
=== Early years ===
Jensen-Abbew started his career at B1973 in Herlev, before joining AB as a U15 player. In September 2018, 16-year old Jensen-Abbew also went on a trial at Premier League club Tottenham's U18 team.

=== Nordsjælland ===
As a U17 player, in January 2019, Jensen-Abbew joined FC Nordsjælland. In his first six months in Nordsjælland, he won the Danish U17 league with his team. His first year as a U19 player, the 2019–20 season, was plagued by injuries for Jensen-Abbew, but it turned into six U18 national matches that season, and he also played a number of matches for the club's first team, against a number of Danish 1st Division clubs in the winter training matches. In the 2020–21 season, Jensen-Abbew captained the U19 team.

On 4 April 2021, 18-year old Jensen-Abbew made his official debut for Nordsjælland in the Danish Superliga against AGF. Jensen-Abbew started on the bench, before replacing Adamo Nagalo in the 66th minute. This was his only professional appearance in the 2020–21 season.

Jensen-Abbew was permanently promoted to the first team squad ahead of the 2021–22 season. At the end of July 2022, Jensen-Abbew was loaned out to Danish 1st Division club HB Køge for the rest of the year.

In the 2022–23 season, Jensen-Abbew made only four official appearances for Nordsjælland. In July 2023, he signed a new deal with Nordsjælland until June 2026.

=== AGF ===
On transfer deadline day, 1 February 2024, Jensen-Abbew was sold for around 1.5 million euros to AGF, where he signed a five-year deal. In 2026 he won the Danish Championship with the club, the first in 40 years. He was however mostly a back-up during the season.

=== ADO Den Haag ===
On 26 August 2026, it was announced that he had signed with ADO Den Haag until June 2030.The move marked his first transfer outside Denmark and followed his breakthrough season with AGF.

== Personal life ==
Jensen-Abbew has a Danish mother and a Ghanaian father.

== Career statistics ==
As of match played 24 October 2026

Appearances and goals by club, season and competition
Club	Season	League			Danish Cup		Europe		Total	
Club	Season	Division	Apps	Goals	Apps	Goals	Apps	Goals	Apps	Goals
Nordsjælland	2020–21	Danish Superliga	1	0	—		—		1	0
Nordsjælland	2021–22	Danish Superliga	11	0	1	0	0	0	12	0
Nordsjælland	2022–23	Danish Superliga	3	0	1	0	0	0	4	0
Nordsjælland	2023–24	Danish Superliga	3	0	1	0	3 (Note: Appearances in UEFA Europa Conference League)	1	7	1
Nordsjælland	Total		18	0	3	0	3	1	24	1
HB Køge (loan)	2022–23	1.Division	13	0	0	0	—		13	0
AGF	2023–24	Danish Superliga	7	1	2	0	—		9	1
AGF	2024–25	Danish Superliga	17	0	2	0	—		19	0
AGF	2025–26	Danish Superliga	12	0	1	0	—		13	0
AGF	2026–27	Danish Superliga	1	0	0	0	2 (Note: Appearances in UEFA Champions League)	0	3	0
AGF	Total		37	1	5	0	2	0	44	1
ADO Den Haag	2026–27	Eredivisie	6	0	0	0	—		6	0
Career total			74	1	8	0	5	1	87	2

== Honours ==
AGF

- Danish Superliga: 2025–26
