= Virklund =

- Town
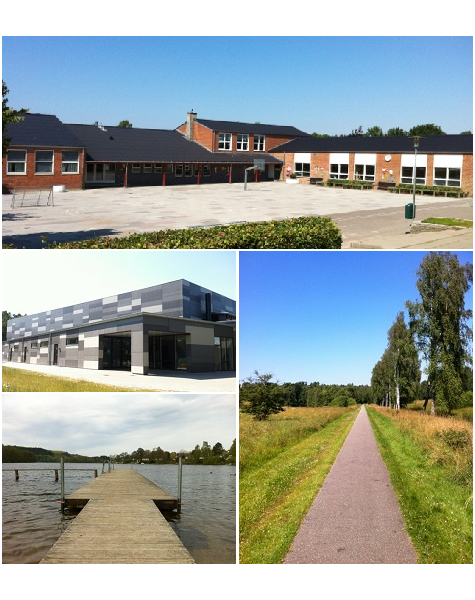
- Clockwise: Virklund School, nature trail towards Silkeborg, view from Thorsøbad and Virklund Fritidscenter

- Location in Denmark Virklund (Central Denmark Region)
- Coordinates: 56°07′50″N 9°33′33″E
- Country: Denmark
- Region: Midtjylland
- Municipality: Silkeborg
- Foundation: pre-history (unknown)
- First mentioned: Late-1300s as Virklang

Area
  - Total: 2.6 km^{2} (1.0 sq mi)

Population (1. January 2026)
  - Total: 3,932
  - Density: 1,500/km^{2} (3,900/sq mi)
- Time zone: UTC+1 (CET)
  - Summer (DST): UTC+1 (CEST)
- Postal code: 8600
- Area code: (+45) 86

Virklund is a town in Denmark, located about 5 km (3.1 mi) south of Silkeborg, to which it functions as a satellite city. It has a population of 3,932 (1 January 2026). Virklund is located in Silkeborg Municipality and therefore is part of the Central Denmark Region.

== Geography ==
Virklund is surrounded by the Silkeborg Forests. Between Silkeborg and Virklund is Silkeborg Western Forest, whose southern end is adjacent to Thorsø Lake. Towards the southern part of Thorsø is Rustrup Forest. East of Virklund is the large Sønderskov Forest.

Thorsø Lake has a length of three km, and in 2006 a trail was built around the lake with a 8 km (5.0 mi) length. At the eastern end of the lake, which faces the town itself, there are several places where one has access to swim in the lake.

Between 1944 and 1955, there was a ski jumping hill at Duedal Bjerg, located south of Thorsø Lake, where several events were arranged.

== Notable residents ==
- Asger Sørensen (born 1996, in Virklund) a Danish professional footballer
- Rasmus Carstensen (born 2000, in Virklund) a Danish professional footballer
