= Prince Amoako Jr. =

Ghanaian footballer (born 2007)

Personal information
- Date of birth: 19 February 2007 (age 19)
- Place of birth: Amasaman, Ghana
- Position: Midfielder

Team information
- Current team: Nordsjælland
- Number: 10

Youth career
- –2025: Right to Dream Academy

Senior career*
Years	Team	Apps	(Gls)
2025–	Nordsjælland	40	(8)

International career^{‡}
2026–	Ghana	1	(0)
- * Club domestic league appearances and goals as of 16:00, 18 October 2026 (UTC) ‡ National team caps and goals as of 22 May 2026

Prince Amoako Junior (born 19 February 2007) is a Ghanaian footballer who plays as a midfielder for FC Nordsjælland in the Danish Superliga and the Ghana national team.

== Club career ==
After having attended the Right to Dream Academy in his native Ghana, Amoako signed his first professional contract with FC Nordsjælland on 25 February 2025. He was sidelined while recovering from injury upon his arrival to the club.

On the opening day of the 2025–26 Danish Superliga season, Amoako made his debut for the club against FC Fredericia, as he was named to the starting lineup. In his debut, he scored a goal in the 4th minute and assisted in another as Nordsjælland won the game 3–2. He scored his second goal in his third appearance, in a 3–2 defeat to Sønderjyske on 3 August. He finished his inaugural season as the club's top scorer, with nine goals from 35 appearances, as the club finished in third place in the Superliga.

== International career ==
Amoako was called up to the Ghana national team for the first time ahead of a friendly against Mexico on 22 May 2026. He made his international debut in the match, coming on in the 66th minute in a 2–0 victory for Ghana.

== Career statistics ==
=== Club ===
As of match played 18 October 2026

Appearances and goals by club, season and competition
Club	Season	League			Cup (Note: Includes Danish Cup)		Continental		Total	
Club	Season	Division	Apps	Goals	Apps	Goals	Apps	Goals	Apps	Goals
Nordsjælland	2025–26	Danish Superliga	31	8	4	1	—		35	9
Nordsjælland	2026–27	Danish Superliga	9	0	1	0	7 (Note: Appearances in UEFA Conference League)	2	17	2
Career total			40	8	5	1	7	2	52	11

=== International ===
As of match played 22 May 2026

Appearances and goals by national team and year
National team	Year	Apps	Goals
Ghana	2026	1	0
Total		1	0
