= Marcus McCoy =

Danish footballer (born 2005)

Personal information
- Date of birth: 24 August 2005 (age 21)
- Place of birth: Odense, Denmark
- Height: 1.87 m (6 ft 2 in)
- Position: Left-back

Team information
- Current team: OB
- Number: 15

Youth career
- –2015: Højby S&G
- 2015–2024: OB

Senior career*
Years	Team	Apps	(Gls)
2023–	OB	42	(2)

International career
2022–2023	Denmark U18	7	(0)
2024	Denmark U19	2	(0)
- * Club domestic league appearances and goals as of 19 May 2026

Marcus McCoy (born 24 August 2005) is a Danish professional footballer who plays as a left-back for Danish Superliga club OB.

== Career ==
=== OB ===
McCoy began his youth career at Højby S&G before joining the OB academy as a U10 player.

Already in February 2022, 16-year-old McCoy was already involved with OB's first team, as he featured in friendly matches. McCoy made his senior competitive debut for OB on 7 September 2023 in a Danish Cup match against Tune IF.

After progressing through the youth ranks, he signed a professional contract with OB in April 2024, ahead of the 2024–25 season and was promoted to the first-team squad. He made his league debut for OB on 3 March 2025, coming on as a substitute in OB's 1–1 draw against Hobro IK in a Danish 1st Division match.

With 11 league appearances during the 2024–25 season, McCoy was part of the OB squad that secured promotion back to the 2025–26 Danish Superliga. During the 2025–26 season, McCoy established himself as a regular member of the OB first-team squad, which led to him signing a new contract with the club in January 2026, extending his deal until June 2030.

== International career ==
At international level, McCoy has represented Denmark at youth levels, appearing for the under-18 and under-19 teams.

McCoy, who has represented Denmark at youth international levels, has also discussed his eligibility to play for the United States through his American father. In an interview in April 2025, he stated that although he would prefer to represent Denmark, he is open to the possibility of switching to the U.S. national team if circumstances made that the better option.

== Honours ==
OB

- Danish 1st Division: 2024–25
