= Michael Akoto =

Ghanaian footballer (born 1997)

Personal information
- Date of birth: 3 October 1997 (age 29)
- Place of birth: Accra, Ghana
- Height: 1.88 m (6 ft 2 in)
- Position: Defensive midfielder

Team information
- Current team: KR Reykjavík
- Number: 4

Youth career
- –2013: SV Frauenstein
- 2013–2016: SV Wehen Wiesbaden

Senior career*
Years	Team	Apps	(Gls)
2016–2018	Wehen Wiesbaden	4	(0)
2018–2021	Mainz 05 II	52	(3)
2021–2023	Dynamo Dresden	52	(1)
2023–2025	AGF	19	(0)
2025–	KR Reykjavík	23	(1)
- * Club domestic league appearances and goals as of 1 November 2026

Michael Akoto (born 3 October 1997) is a German professional footballer who plays as a defensive midfielder for KR Reykjavík in Iceland.

== Career ==
On 1 June 2018, Akoto joined Mainz from Wehen Wiesbaden, where he came through the youth ranks and made his professional debut. He signed a two-year contract with the club.

On 30 June 2021, Akoto joined 3. Liga club Dynamo Dresden, signing a two-year contract.

On 5 June 2023, Akoto joined Danish Superliga club AGF on a free transfer, signing a two-year contract. Before the last match of the 2024-25 season, it was announced that Akoto will leave the club after the season.

In August 2025, Akoto joined Icelandic club KR Reykjavík until the end of 2027.

== Career statistics ==
As of 19 November 2024

Appearances and goals by club, season and competition
Club	Season	League			Cup		Europe		Other		Total	
Club	Season	Division	Apps	Goals	Apps	Goals	Apps	Goals	Apps	Goals	Apps	Goals
Wehen Wiesbaden	2017–18	3. Liga	4	0	0	0	—		—		4	0
Mainz 05 II	2018–19	Regionalliga Südwest	7	0	0	0	—		—		7	0
Mainz 05 II	2019–20	Regionalliga Südwest	20	1	0	0	—		—		20	1
Mainz 05 II	2020–21	Regionalliga Südwest	25	2	0	0	—		—		25	2
Mainz 05 II	Total		52	3	0	0	0	0	0	0	52	3
Dynamo Dresden	2021–22	3. Liga	30	1	2	0	—		1 (Note: Appearance in promotion/relegation playoffs.)	0	33	1
Dynamo Dresden	2022–23	2. Bundesliga	21	0	1	0	—		—		22	0
Dynamo Dresden	Total		51	1	3	0	0	0	1	0	55	1
AGF	2023–24	Danish Superliga	11	0	5	0	2 (Note: Appearances in UEFA Champions League)	0	—		18	0
AGF	2024–25	Danish Superliga	3	0	0	0	—		—		3	0
AGF	Total		14	0	5	0	2	0	0	0	21	0
Career total			121	4	8	0	2	0	1	0	132	4
