= Tobias Bech =

Danish footballer (born 2002)

Personal information
- Full name: Tobias Bech Kristensen
- Date of birth: 19 February 2002 (age 24)
- Place of birth: Møldrup, Denmark
- Height: 1.89 m (6 ft 2 in)
- Position: Winger

Team information
- Current team: AGF
- Number: 31

Youth career
- 2006–2011: Møldrup-Tostrup IF
- 2011–2013: Viborg Søndermarken
- 2013–2014: Klejtrup IF
- 2014–2018: Viborg

Senior career*
Years	Team	Apps	(Gls)
2018–2022	Viborg	88	(17)
2022–2023	Ingolstadt 04	35	(13)
2023–	AGF	87	(25)

International career
2019	Denmark U18	1	(0)
2020	Denmark U19	2	(0)
2022	Denmark U20	1	(0)
2023–2024	Denmark U21	5	(2)
- * Club domestic league appearances and goals as of 16:51, 11 May 2026 (UTC)

Tobias Bech Kristensen (born 19 February 2002) is a Danish professional footballer who plays as a winger for Danish Superliga club AGF.

== Career ==
=== Viborg ===
Bech started playing football at the age of four and played for a few clubs, before joining Viborg FF as a youth player. In August 2015, he scored a hattrick at the age of 15 for the U17s. Later in October, he signed a contract until June 2021 with the club. Bech's Danish 1st Division debut on 11 March 2018 made him the youngest player ever to play in the league. Bech was 16 years and 20 days old on his debut. Bech was also the youngest player ever to debut for Viborg FF, taking over the record from his cousin, Oliver Haurits.

=== Ingolstadt 04 ===
After failing to agree on a contract extension with Viborg, it was confirmed on 5 August 2022 that Bech had been sold to German 3. Liga club FC Ingolstadt 04, signing a contract until June 2025.

=== AGF ===
After one season in Germany, Bech returned to Denmark, signing a five-year deal on 26 June 2023 with AGF. He scored on his debut for the club, securing a 1–0 victory against rivals Vejle on the first matchday of the season.

In the 2025–26 season he won the Danish Championship with the club, the first in 40 years. Afterwards, he was nominated for the Superliga player of the year award.

== Personal life ==
Bech was diagnosed with ADHD, which prevented him from playing with the Danish youth national teams.

== Career statistics ==
As of match played 8 March 2026

Appearances and goals by club, season and competition
Club	Season	League			National cup (Note: Includes Danish Cup)		Continental		Total	
Club	Season	Division	Apps	Goals	Apps	Goals	Apps	Goals	Apps	Goals
Viborg	2017–18	Danish 1st Division	3	0	0	0	—		3	0
Viborg	2018–19	Danish 1st Division	3	0	0	0	—		3	0
Viborg	2019–20	Danish 1st Division	21	4	1	1	—		22	5
Viborg	2020–21	Danish 1st Division	31	8	0	0	—		31	8
Viborg	2021–22	Danish Superliga	27	3	0	0	—		27	3
Viborg	2022–23	Danish Superliga	3	2	0	0	1 (Note: Appearances in UEFA Europa Conference League)	0	4	2
Viborg	Total		88	17	1	1	1	0	90	18
Ingolstadt 04	2022–23	3. Liga	35	13	—		—		35	13
AGF	2023–24	Danish Superliga	30	7	7	1	2	0	39	8
AGF	2024–25	Danish Superliga	30	8	3	0	—		33	8
AGF	2025–26	Danish Superliga	22	10	6	1	—		28	11
AGF	2026–27	Danish Superliga	5	0	0	0	6 (Note: Four appearances and one goal in UEFA Champions League, two appearances in UEFA Europa League)	1	11	1
AGF	Total		87	25	16	2	8	1	111	27
Career total			210	55	17	3	9	1	236	58

== Honours ==
Viborg

- Danish 1st Division: 2020–21

AGF

- Danish Superliga: 2025–26

Individual

- Danish Superliga Team of the Month: October 2023
- Danish Superliga Team of the Year: 2025–26
