= Stefen Tchamche =

Danish footballer (born 2006)

Personal information
- Full name: Stefen Erwan Tchamche
- Date of birth: 8 January 2006 (age 20)
- Place of birth: Hørning, Denmark
- Position: Forward

Team information
- Current team: AGF
- Number: 27

Youth career
- Hørning IF
- –2022: IF Lyseng
- 2022–2025: AGF

Senior career*
| Years | Team | Apps | (Gls) |
| 2025– | AGF | 13 | (1) |

International career^{‡}
| 2025– | Denmark U19 | 2 | (0) |
- * Club domestic league appearances and goals as of 16:50, 11 May 2026 (UTC) ‡ National team caps and goals as of 19:52, 9 August 2025 (UTC)

Stefen Erwan Tchamche (born 8 January 2006) is a Danish professional footballer who plays as a forward for Danish Superliga club AGF.

== Career ==
=== AGF ===
Tchamche grew up in Hørning, a town located in Skanderborg Municipality, and started playing football in the local club Hørning IF, later joining IF Lyseng, before moving to AGF in 2022.

In April 2025, following a strong season with the club's U-19 team, AGF confirmed that the parties had agreed on a contract extension until June 2027, which would take effect from 1 July 2025. In the pre-season ahead of the 2025–26 season, 19-year-old Tchamche made his mark on the club's first team, which is why, just one week into his contract period, he had it replaced with a new one until June 2029 and was permanently moved up to the first-team squad.

Just a few days after the contract extension, Tchamche came off the bench in a friendly match against the Dutch giants Ajax and scored, making the final score 1–1. On 20 July 2025, Tchamche also made his official debut for AGF when he came on with about fifteen minutes left in the club's first match of the 2025–26 Danish Superliga season, a 1–1 draw against Sønderjyske. He scored his first senior goal in a 3–3 draw against Brøndby IF, where he scored the equalising goal in the 91st minute. That season he won the Danish Championship with the club, the first in 40 years.

== Honours ==
AGF

- Danish Superliga: 2025–26
