= Magnus Jensen (footballer) =

Danish footballer (born 1996)

Personal information
- Full name: Magnus Riisgaard Sigmann-Jensen
- Date of birth: 27 October 1996 (age 30)
- Place of birth: Kolding, Denmark
- Height: 1.95 m (6 ft 5 in)
- Position: Centre-back

Team information
- Current team: Midtjylland
- Number: 3

Youth career
- 2009–2014: Viborg

Senior career*
Years	Team	Apps	(Gls)
2014–2016	Viborg	0	(0)
2016–2019	Skive	55	(3)
2020–2023	Horsens	68	(14)
2023–2025	Lyngby	51	(3)
2025–2026	Sønderjyske	29	(4)
2026–	Midtjylland	7	(0)
- * Club domestic league appearances and goals as of 19 September 2026

Magnus Riisgaard Jensen (born 27 October 1996) is a Danish professional footballer who plays as a centre-back for Danish Superliga club Midtjylland.

== Club career ==
He made his Danish Superliga debut for AC Horsens on 24 February 2020 in a game against AGF. After three and a half seasons at Horsens, Jensen joined Lyngby Boldklub in July 2023, signing a deal until June 2026.

On 27 May 2025, Jensen signed with Sønderjyske Fodbold on a four-year contract.

In 2026, Jensen signed with Midtjylland on a three-year contract.

== Career statistics ==
As of match played 19 September 2026

Appearances and goals by club, season and competition
Club	Season	League			Cup		Europe		Other		Total	
Club	Season	Division	Apps	Goals	Apps	Goals	Apps	Goals	Apps	Goals	Apps	Goals
Viborg	2015–16	Danish Superliga	0	0	0	0	—		—		0	0
Skive	2016–17	Danish 1st Division	15	1	1	0	—		—		16	1
Skive	2017–18	Danish 1st Division	23	0	3	0	—		—		26	0
Skive	2018–19	Danish 2nd Division	25	3	1	1	—		—		26	4
Skive	2019–20	Danish 1st Division	18	2	3	0	—		—		21	2
Skive	Total		81	6	8	1	—		—		89	7
Horsens	2019–20	Danish Superliga	2	0	0	0	—		0	0	2	0
Horsens	2020–21	Danish Superliga	9	0	3	0	—		—		12	0
Horsens	2021–22	Danish 1st Division	32	10	4	1	—		—		36	11
Horsens	2022–23	Danish Superliga	25	4	0	0	—		—		25	4
Horsens	Total		68	14	7	1	—		0	0	75	15
Lyngby	2023–24	Danish Superliga	23	2	4	0	—		—		27	2
Lyngby	2024–25	Danish Superliga	28	1	0	0	—		—		28	1
Lyngby	Total		51	3	4	0	—		—		55	3
Sønderjyske	2025–26	Danish Superliga	29	4	2	1	—		—		31	5
Midtjylland	2026–27	Danish Superliga	7	0	0	0	2 (Note: Appearances in UEFA Conference League)	1	—		9	1
Career total			236	27	21	3	2	1	0	0	259	31
