= Jakob Jessen =

Danish footballer (born 2004)

Personal information
- Full name: Jakob Vestergaard Jessen
- Date of birth: 5 March 2004 (age 22)
- Place of birth: Svendborg, Denmark
- Height: 1.84 m (6 ft 0 in)
- Position: Left-back

Team information
- Current team: Kasımpaşa
- Number: 5

Youth career
- –2016: Stjernen BK
- 2016–2018: OB
- 2018–2020: SfB-Oure FA
- 2020–2023: OB

Senior career*
Years	Team	Apps	(Gls)
2023–2026	Fredericia	81	(3)
2026–	Kasımpaşa	5	(0)

International career^{‡}
2025	Denmark U-21	1	(0)
- * Club domestic league appearances and goals as of 18 October 2026 ‡ National team caps and goals as of 4 September 2025

Jakob Vestergaard Jessen (born 5 March 2004) is a Danish professional footballer who plays as a left-back for Turkish Süper Lig club Kasımpaşa.

== Club career ==
=== Early career ===
Jessen began his career at local club Tved Boldklub before later joining Odense Boldklub, commonly known as OB. He played there between 2016 and 2018 before returning to Svendborg to represent SfB-Oure FA. In the summer of 2020, he returned to OB, joining the club on a three-year contract. In the summer of 2023, he was assessed as not yet ready for senior football, and as a result his contract was not renewed, leading to his departure from the club.

=== Fredericia ===
On 25 July 2023, Jessen joined Danish 1st Division club FC Fredericia on a deal until the end of 2025. After making 18 appearances and scoring two goals, Jessen signed a contract extension in March 2024, two days after his 20th birthday, extending his deal with FC Fredericia until June 2027.

=== Kasımpaşa ===
On 12 July 2026, Jessen signed with Kasımpaşa in Turkey.

== International career ==
In September 2025, Jessen received a call-up to the Denmark under-21 national team, making his debut in a friendly match against Norway.
