= Tobias Mølgaard =

Danish footballer (born 1996)

Personal information
- Full name: Tobias Mølgaard Henriksen
- Date of birth: 22 July 1996 (age 30)
- Place of birth: Gudum, Denmark
- Position: Right-back

Team information
- Current team: AGF
- Number: 14

Youth career
- 2001–2005: Gudum IF
- 2005–2009: Lemvig GF
- 2010–2011: Holstebro
- 2011–2014: Thisted

Senior career*
Years	Team	Apps	(Gls)
2014–2018	Thisted	44	(1)
2018–2022	Vejle	89	(2)
2022–	AGF	68	(1)
- * Club domestic league appearances and goals as of 16:32, 11 May 2026 (UTC)

Tobias Mølgaard Henriksen (born 22 July 1996) is a Danish professional footballer who plays as a right-back for Danish Superliga club AGF.

== Career ==
=== Thisted ===
Mølgaard was born in Gudum, Lemvig Municipality, Denmark. As a youth, he started playing football for local clubs Gudum IF, Lemvig GF and Holstebro Boldklub, before joining the Thisted FC youth academy. He made his senior debut on the last matchday of the 2013–14 Danish 2nd Divisions season under head coach Christian Flindt Bjerg. In September 2014, he signed a two-year contract extension with the club.

=== Vejle ===
On 4 January 2018, it was announced that Vejle Boldklub had signed a two-and-a-half-year with Mølgaard starting from 1 July 2018, after he had made his breakthrough for the Thisted first team. In May 2019, he extended his contract with Vejle until 2022.

=== AGF ===
On 13 June 2022, Danish Superliga club AGF announced they had reached a deal to sign Mølgaard from Vejle on a three-year contract. In 2026 he won the Danish Championship with the club, the first in 40 years.

== Honours ==
AGF

- Danish Superliga: 2025–26
