= Sebastian Jørgensen =

Danish footballer (born 2000)

Personal information
- Full name: Sebastian Vinther Jørgensen
- Date of birth: 8 June 2000 (age 26)
- Place of birth: Silkeborg, Denmark
- Height: 1.78 m (5 ft 10 in)
- Position: Right winger

Team information
- Current team: AGF (on loan from Malmö FF)
- Number: 8

Youth career
- HA85
- Silkeborg IF

Senior career*
Years	Team	Apps	(Gls)
2018–2023	Silkeborg IF	111	(27)
2023–	Malmö FF	31	(2)
2025	→ IFK Norrköping (loan)	14	(5)
2025–	→ AGF (loan)	15	(0)

International career
2018–2019	Denmark U19	4	(0)
2022	Denmark U21	5	(0)
- * Club domestic league appearances and goals as of 10 December 2025

Sebastian Vinther Jørgensen (born 8 June 2000) is a Danish professional footballer who plays as a right winger for Danish Superliga club AGF, on loan from Allsvenskan club Malmö FF.

== Honours ==
Malmö FF

- Allsvenskan: 2023, 2024
- Svenska Cupen: 2023–24

AGF

- Danish Superliga: 2025–26
