= Patrick Mortensen =

Danish footballer (born 1989)

Personal information
- Full name: Patrick Mortensen
- Date of birth: 13 July 1989 (age 37)
- Place of birth: Copenhagen, Denmark
- Height: 1.88 m (6 ft 2 in)
- Position: Striker

Team information
- Current team: Brøndby

Youth career
- AB 70
- Amager United
- FC Amager

Senior career*
Years	Team	Apps	(Gls)
2006–2007	Fremad Amager	10	(1)
2007–2009	Brøndby	3	(0)
2009	→ Lyngby (loan)	9	(5)
2010–2015	Lyngby	157	(56)
2015–2019	Sarpsborg 08	94	(32)
2019–2026	AGF	232	(106)
2026–	Brøndby	6	(1)

International career
2010–2011	Denmark U21	7	(2)
- * Club domestic league appearances and goals as of 6 September 2026

Patrick Mortensen (born 13 July 1989) is a Danish professional footballer who plays as a striker for Danish Superliga club Brøndby.

Born in Copenhagen, Mortensen progressed through several youth academies on Amager and made his senior debut for Fremad Amager in October 2006. He signed for Brøndby the following year but did not break into the first team, and at Lyngby Boldklub he established himself as a goalscorer. After joining Norwegian club Sarpsborg 08 in 2015, he reached two Norwegian Cup finals and played in the group stage of the 2018–19 UEFA Europa League. He returned to Denmark with AGF in January 2019 and spent seven seasons at the club, becoming its all-time leading scorer in the Superliga. As captain, he led AGF to the 2025–26 title, their first in 40 years, before rejoining Brøndby in 2026. He holds Superliga records for the most penalty goals and, among outfield players, the most consecutive appearances.

Mortensen made seven appearances for the Denmark under-21 team, scoring twice, and was first named in the senior squad in November 2020.

== Club career ==
=== Early career ===
Born in Copenhagen, through his youth years, Mortensen has represented several clubs from Copenhagen such as AB 70, Amager United and the merger youth academy of several clubs from Amager, FS Amager, which changed its name to Amager - Øens Hold in the time Mortensen played there.

Mortensen began his senior career for the second-tier Danish 1st Division club Fremad Amager. In the period before his debut at senior level, he had been allowed to practice as an amateur with club's first team by the then head coach Benny Johansen and convinced the club's professional management to offer him a more permanent contract, which he signed on 5 November 2006. He officially made his debut as a 17-year-old for the club's first team on 15 October 2006, a month after his 17th birthday, in a home game at Sundby Idrætspark against Lyngby Boldklub in the 1st Division, when he came on as a substitute for Lars Brøgger in the 84th minute. Mortensen subsequently reached a total of 10 appearances with one goal, in the home game against Thisted on 15 April 2007, in the 2006–07 season, after which Fremad Amager suffered relegation to the third-tier Danish 2nd Division.

=== Brøndby ===
With effect from 1 August 2007, Mortensen moved to Danish Superliga club Brøndby on a two-year contract and thus accompanied one of his former head coaches Peer F. Hansen to Brøndby, where Hansen had recently been hired as a U21 coach. Mortensen began his tenure at the club's reserve team in the third-tier Danish 2nd Division East, where he made his debut on 19 August 2007 in an away match against FC Roskilde. In early March 2008, Mortensen was on a three-day trial practice with the northern French Ligue 1 club Lille, but this did not result in a move.

=== Lyngby ===
On 1 September 2009, Brøndby sent Mortensen on a six-month loan to Lyngby Boldklub in the second-tier 1st Division. He played his first game for the club on 6 September, when he came on as a substitute for Anders Christiansen in a 1–0 defeat at Viborg. On 27 September, he scored his first goal, in a 3–0 win over Brabrand. On 15 December 2009, Mortensen's move to Lyngby became permanent, joining the club on a three-year deal. At the end of that same season, Lyngby earned promotion to the Superliga.

On 29 August 2010, Mortensen managed to score his first goal in the top division, in the 3–3 home draw against his former team Brøndby. The match became mostly known for Remco van der Schaaf scoring a hat-trick for the away team. Lyngby suffered relegation back to the 1st Division at the end of the next season, with Mortensen remaining in the team until the summer of 2015. He finished his five-and-a-half-year stint with the club with 172 appearances in which he scored 66 goals.

=== Sarpsborg 08 ===
In March 2015, Mortensen signed with Norwegian club Sarpsborg 08, with him joining the team from June in the same year. He played his first game for the club on 26 July 2015, in an Tippeligaen fixture against Mjøndalen IF. As a starter in the match, he immediately showed goal scoring prowess by scoring his first goal for the team, which was, however, not enough for his team to win the game, as it ended in a 2–2 draw. He scored again the next league game against Rosenborg in a 3–2 loss. While at Sarpsborg, Mortensen was part of two Norwegian Football Cup finals; in 2015 and 2017. Both finals were lost, to Rosenborg and Lillestrøm, respectively.

With Sarpsborg, he participated in the group stage of the 2018–19 UEFA Europa League where he distinguished himself on 4 October 2018 by scoring a brace against Belgian club Genk, contributing to the 3–1 victory of his team. He scored another European goal against Malmö FF on 8 November in a 1–1 draw. His team, however, finished bottom of the group and failed to advance in the competition.

=== AGF ===
On 12 January 2019, Mortensen moved from Sarpsborg to AGF on a four-year contract. He scored his first goal for the club on 15 February in a 2–0 away win over SønderjyskE. He scored nine goals in his first 12 appearances for AGF, as the team reached play-offs for European football.

Mortensen experienced as strong second season in Aarhus, especially in the second half of the season, as AGF finished third in the league table. Part of the success was thanks to Mortensen's sharpness in front of goal, as he finished runner-up in the top goalscorer title of the Superliga, one goal behind Ronnie Schwartz. He made 39 league appearances in which he scored 18 goals. He was subsequently voted AGF Player of the Year for 2019–20.

Mortensen scored eight goals before the winter break of the 2020–21 Danish Superliga, along with two goals in two appearances in the Europa League, as AGF were knocked out in the second qualifying round to Slovenian club NŠ Mura.

On 21 October 2024, Mortensen broke the record for most penalty kick goals in the Danish Superliga with 22 goals, in a 1–0 win against Brøndby. In February 2026 he beat the superliga record for most matches played in a row with 122.

During the 2024–25 season, there was speculation that the club did not want to extend his contract, despite Mortensen wanting to stay. In the end, they did agree on a one-year extension, keeping him at AGF until 2026. In 2026 he won the Danish Championship with the club, the first in 40 years.

By the time of his departure, Mortensen had become AGF's all-time leading scorer in the Superliga, with 115 goals in 265 matches across all competitions for the club. He also set two Superliga records during his time at AGF: in 2024 he overtook Jakob Poulsen for the most penalty goals in the competition's history, and on 22 February 2026, in a 5–1 win over Viborg, he passed Magnus Kofod Andersen's mark of 121 consecutive Superliga appearances for an outfield player, reaching 122.

=== Return to Brøndby ===
On 1 June 2026, following the expiry of his AGF contract, Mortensen returned to Brøndby on a free transfer, signing a two-year deal until 2028. The move reunited him with the club where he had made his first Superliga appearances almost two decades earlier; Brøndby's director of football, Julius Ohnesorge, said Mortensen was signed as much for his leadership and influence on the club's younger players as for his on-field qualities. Danish media reported that AGF had been close to agreeing a contract extension before Brøndby intervened with the offer of a second year.

== International career ==
Mortensen made his debut for the Denmark under-21 national team in 2010.

In November 2020, he was called up to Kasper Hjulmand's senior squad for the friendly against Sweden due to several cancellations from, among others, the Danish national team players playing in England, due to the COVID-19 restrictions, as well as a case of COVID-19 in the squad, which had put several national team players in quarantine. He was on the bench for the game against Sweden.

== Career statistics ==
=== Club ===
As of match played 6 September 2026

Appearances and goals by club, season and competition
Club	Season	League			National cup (Note: Includes Danish Cup, Norwegian Cup)		Europe		Total	
Club	Season	Division	Apps	Goals	Apps	Goals	Apps	Goals	Apps	Goals
Fremad Amager	2006–07	Danish 1st Division	10	1	0	0	—		10	1
Brøndby	2007–08	Danish Superliga	3	0	0	0	0	0	3	0
Brøndby	2008–09	Danish Superliga	0	0	1	2	—		1	2
Brøndby	Total		3	0	1	2	0	0	4	2
Lyngby	2009–10	Danish 1st Division	21	8	0	0	—		21	8
Lyngby	2010–11	Danish Superliga	27	4	2	1	—		29	5
Lyngby	2011–12	Danish Superliga	27	6	0	0	—		27	6
Lyngby	2012–13	Danish 1st Division	31	12	2	2	—		33	14
Lyngby	2013–14	Danish 1st Division	33	23	2	2	—		35	25
Lyngby	2014–15	Danish 1st Division	27	8	0	0	—		27	8
Lyngby	Total		166	61	6	5	—		172	66
Sarpsborg 08	2015	Tippeligaen	10	3	3	3	—		13	6
Sarpsborg 08	2016	Tippeligaen	26	5	3	2	—		29	7
Sarpsborg 08	2017	Eliteserien	30	12	6	3	—		36	15
Sarpsborg 08	2018	Eliteserien	28	12	1	0	14 (Note: Appearances in UEFA Europa League)	7	43	19
Sarpsborg 08	Total		94	32	13	8	14	7	121	47
AGF	2018–19	Danish Superliga	12	9	0	0	—		12	9
AGF	2019–20	Danish Superliga	35	18	4	1	—		39	19
AGF	2020–21	Danish Superliga	29	15	5	2	2	2	36	19
AGF	2021–22	Danish Superliga	28	6	2	0	—		30	6
AGF	2022–23	Danish Superliga	32	16	1	0	—		33	16
AGF	2023–24	Danish Superliga	32	13	7	1	2 (Note: Appearances in UEFA Europa Conference League)	0	41	14
AGF	2024–25	Danish Superliga	32	20	3	1	—		34	21
AGF	2025–26	Danish Superliga	32	9	6	2	—		38	11
AGF	Total		232	104	28	7	4	2	264	113
Brøndby	2026–27	Danish Superliga	6	1	0	0	—		6	1
Career total			507	198	48	22	18	9	573	229

== Honours ==
Sarpsborg 08

- Norwegian Football Cup runner-up: 2015, 2017

AGF

- Danish Superliga: 2025–26

Individual

- AGF Player of the Year: 2019–20, 2024–25
- Danish Superliga Top Scorer: 2022–23, 2024–25
- Danish Superliga Player of the Month: February 2025
- Danish Superliga Team of the Year: 2024–25
