= Eric Kahl =

Swedish footballer (born 2001)

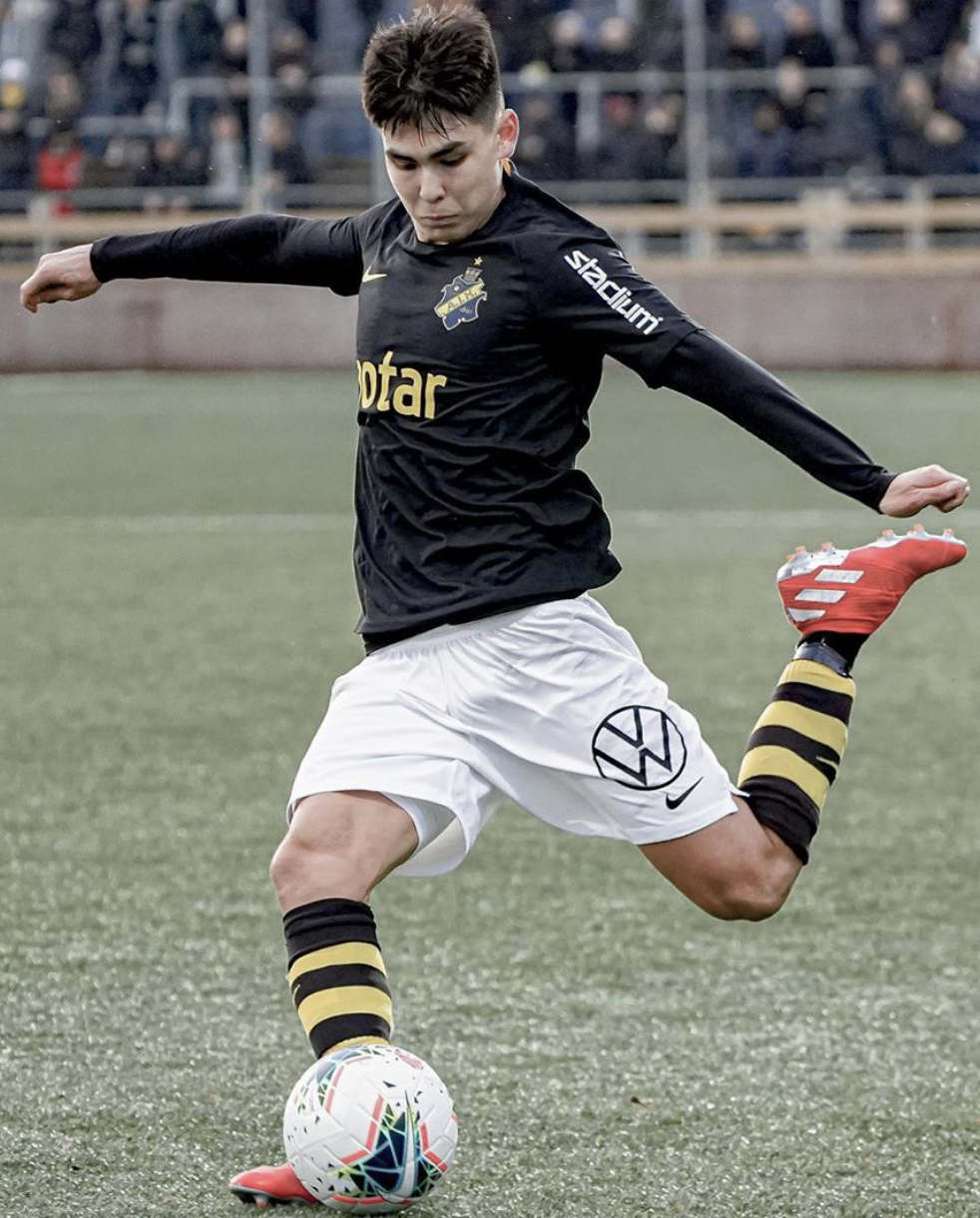
- Kahl with AIK in 2020

Personal information
- Full name: Eric Andre Kahl
- Date of birth: 27 September 2001 (age 25)
- Place of birth: Solna, Stockholm, Sweden
- Height: 1.83 m (6 ft 0 in)
- Position: Left-back

Team information
- Current team: AGF
- Number: 19

Youth career
- 2005–2019: AIK

Senior career*
Years	Team	Apps	(Gls)
2019–2021	AIK	29	(0)
2021–	AGF	141	(3)

International career
2020–2022	Sweden U21	13	(0)
- * Club domestic league appearances and goals as of 16:48, 11 May 2026 (UTC)

Eric Andre Kahl (born 27 September 2001) is a Swedish professional footballer who plays as a left-back for Danish Superliga club AGF.

Kahl has represented AIK since he was 4 years old, when he joined the clubs academy. From there he has gone from youth and junior teams all the way to the first squad. Kahl signed in October 2019 his first professional contract with the club. He has since played over 30 games and has been one of the decisive players in the team.

From 2020 to 2022, Kahl played for the Sweden U21 national team. Prior to that, he had not represented any of Sweden's youth teams, apart from training with the U18 team but without playing time.

== Club career ==
=== Early life ===
Kahl was born and raised in Solna Municipality, in central Stockholm County, by a Thai mother and a Swedish father. He started playing for the youth team of the largest club in the Swedish capital, the team he supports, AIK, at age four.

=== AIK ===
==== 2020 season ====
Kahl signed his first professional contract with AIK on October 17, 2019. The contract made him linked to the club until 31 December 2022.

Kahl made his first-team debut for AIK and Allsvenskan debut on 28 June 2020 playing the full match in a 2–2-draw against Malmö FF on Friends Arena in Solna. After the match, Kahl was highly praised by the media and also by the then head coach Rikard Norling. Norling meant that Kahl made a simple and stable effort.

Kahl made his first assist in the Allsvenskan on October 18, 2020, when AIK played a home match at Friends Arena against rival IFK Göteborg. The assist came in the 61st minute when Kahl sent a ball to Henok Goitom who could then place the ball in the right cross after he shot outside the penalty area. The goal meant a 2–0 lead for AIK and it also became the final result.

In November 2020, AIK's sports director Henrik Jurelius confirmed that the club had received an offer for Kahl, but they chose to refuse, reason? The bid must simply have been too low for AIK to agree to make a deal. Eric Kahl's agent Fredrik Söderström confirmed in an interview that there was interest in Kahl already during the summer of 2020, but that no concrete offer had been received by then. In September 2020, the Portuguese newspaper A Bola wrote that the Primeira Liga club Famalicão had shown interest in Kahl. According to the Transfermarket survey from 10 December 2020, Kahl's value will be around 1 million euros.

==== 2021 season ====
At the beginning of 2021, AIK received a bid for Kahl from the MLS club New York Red Bulls on $600,000, a bid that AIK thought was "shameful" and that the club valuing the player at $2,400,000 at least. There must also have been interest in Kahl from the Belgian club Club Brügge and from Italian clubs. Kahl also said in an interview with the Fotbollskanalen that it is in AIK that he will play for at least until the summer of 2021.

However, Kahl and AIK began the season 2021 with an exhibition game against AIK's cooperative club Vasalunds IF. AIK lost 2–0 after two quick goals at the start of the match. AIK then played three more exhibition games against Örebro SK twice and IF Elfsborg once (3–1, 0–1, 1–0) all games at Friends Arena.

The competition games then started February 20, 2021 with a cup-match against Oskarshamns AIK. Kahl and AIK won the game with 2–1 and Kahl played the whole game. Following to the second game in the cup AIK beat AFC Eskilstuna at home with 4–0 and Kahl played 68 minutes before he was replaced by Yasin Ayari. The former Birmingham City and Sunderland midfielder Sebastian Larsson scored twice. Before what will be the last match in the Swedish Cup for Kahl and his AIK was a derby against arch-rival Hammarby IF. Hammarby pulled the longest straw in the derby and won the match 3–2, which meant that AIK did not advance from the group stage after finishing second in the group.

=== AGF ===
On 24 July 2021, Kahl joined Danish Superliga club AGF on a five-year deal. In 2026 he won the Danish Championship with the club, the first in 40 years. The following summer he extended his contract with the club until 2029.

== International career ==
=== Youth ===
After only training with Sweden's U18 team before, Kahl had never represented any of Sweden's youth teams. Despite that, he was called up to the Swedish U21 national team on 28 August 2020 together with teammate Bilal Hussein. The reason was that Jens Cajuste and Kalle Björklund had been forced to rebid. Sweden would play two European Championship qualifiers against Iceland and Italy on September 4, and September 8, 2020.

Although Kahl had been called in as a kind of emergency solution, he still played both matches against Iceland and Italy from the start. The match against Iceland ended with a loss for Kahl and his Sweden with 1–0, but the match against Italy the Swedes pulled up and beat the Italians 3–0.

== Personal life ==
Kahl was born and raised in Solna Municipality, in central Stockholm County, to a Thai mother and a Swedish father. Kahl has a brother, Oscar Kahl, who is three years his senior and who is also a professional football player in the Thai League 1.

== Career statistics ==
As of match played 26 May 2024

Appearances and goals by club, season and competition
Club	Season	League			National cup (Note: Includes Svenska Cupen, Danish Cup)		Continental		Other		Total	
Club	Season	Division	Apps	Goals	Apps	Goals	Apps	Goals	Apps	Goals	Apps	Goals
AIK	2019	Allsvenskan	0	0	0	0	—		0	0	0	0
AIK	2020	Allsvenskan	26	0	1	0	—		0	0	27	0
AIK	2021	Allsvenskan	3	0	3	0	—		0	0	6	0
AIK	Total		29	0	4	0	—		0	0	33	0
AGF	2021–22	Danish Superliga	24	2	2	0	0	0	0	0	26	2
AGF	2022–23	Danish Superliga	31	0	3	0	—		0	0	34	0
AGF	2023–24	Danish Superliga	30	1	7	0	2 (Note: Appearances in UEFA Europa Conference League)	0	0	0	39	1
AGF	Total		85	4	12	0	2	0	0	0	99	4
Career total			114	4	16	0	2	0	0	0	132	4

== Honours ==
AGF

- Danish Superliga: 2025–26
