= Jannich Storch =

Danish footballer (born 1993)

Personal information
- Full name: Jannich Victor Bøgelund Storch
- Date of birth: 12 May 1993 (age 33)
- Place of birth: Helsinge, Denmark
- Position: Goalkeeper

Team information
- Current team: Randers
- Number: 32

Youth career
- Helsinge
- Nordsjælland

Senior career*
Years	Team	Apps	(Gls)
2012–2014	Nordsjælland	1	(0)
2014–2017	AB	78	(0)
2018	Roskilde	9	(0)
2019–2023	Nykøbing	76	(0)
2023–2025	Lyngby	31	(0)
2025–	Randers	6	(0)

International career
2009	Denmark U16	3	(0)

Managerial career
- 2021–2023: Brøndby (youth gk coach)
- 2023–2025: Lyngby (youth gk coach)
- * Club domestic league appearances and goals as of 19 May 2026

Jannich Victor Bøgelund Storch (born 12 May 1993) is a Danish footballer who plays as a goalkeeper for Randers FC in the Danish Superliga. Storch has amassed 3 youth caps for Denmark, playing for the Danish under-16s.

== Club career ==
=== Early years ===
Jannich Storch began his youth career at his hometown club of Helsinge Fodbold, where he was later picked up by Superliga team Nordsjælland in February 2009.

In the summer of 2009, Storch attracted the attention of Blackburn Rovers during a Danish under-16 match in Portugal, with whom he would go on trial. He was later offered a contract by the English club after an impressive match for the youth team, making 12 saves and a penalty kick, but decided against signing with the Premier League team saying it was too early for him to leave Denmark.

=== Nordsjælland ===
Storch was included in the first team squad for FCN's 2011-12 Superliga season, as third choice goalkeeper behind Jesper Hansen and David Jensen. 2 October 2011, Storch made his league debut, coming on as a half time substitute in a 1–0 win over SønderjyskE.

=== Nykøbing FC ===
On 7 January 2019, Nykøbing FC announced the signing of Storch.

=== Lyngby Boldklub ===
On 23 January 2023, Storch signed for Lyngby Boldklub on an eighteen-month contract, combining his playing role with a goalkeeper coaching role in the academy. In March 2024, his contract with Lyngby was extended by a year, running to the Summer of 2025.

=== Randers FC ===
After a 2024–25 season that ended in relegation for Lyngby, Storch turned down a contract extension with the club and instead joined Randers FC, signing a deal until June 2028.

== Coaching career ==
In May 2018, Storch founded the company JS Keepers, which offered goalkeeping training to both clubs and individuals.

In October 2020, Storch was hired as a youth goalkeeper coach at RB Køge. Storch was later also a part of the coaching team at the academy of Brøndby IF.

== Career statistics ==
=== Club ===
As of match played 9 March 2025

Club	Season	League			Danish Cup		Continental		Total	
Club	Season	Division	Apps	Goals	Apps	Goals	Apps	Goals	Apps	Goals
Nordsjælland	2010-11	Danish Superliga	0	0	0	0	0	0	0	0
Nordsjælland	2011-12	Danish Superliga	1	0	0	0	0	0	1	0
Nordsjælland	2012-13	Danish Superliga	0	0	0	0	0	0	0	0
Nordsjælland	2013-14	Danish Superliga	0	0	0	0	0	0	0	0
Nordsjælland	Total		1	0	0	0	0	0	1	0
AB	2013-14	Danish 1st Division	15	0	0	0	—		15	0
AB	2014-15	Danish 1st Division	33	0	0	0	—		33	0
AB	2016-17	Danish 1st Division	30	0	0	0	—		30	0
AB	Total		78	0	0	0	0	0	78	0
Roskilde	2017-18	Danish 1st Division	0	0	0	0	—		0	0
Roskilde	2018-19	Danish 1st Division	9	0	0	0	—		9	0
Roskilde	Total		9	0	0	0	0	0	9	0
Nykøbing	2018-19	Danish 1st Division	1	0	0	0	—		1	0
Nykøbing	2019-20	Danish 1st Division	29	0	0	0	—		29	0
Nykøbing	2021-22	Danish 1st Division	30	0	1	0	—		31	0
Nykøbing	2022-23	Danish 1st Division	16	0	0	0	—		16	0
Nykøbing	Total		76	0	1	0	0	0	77	0
Lyngby	2022-23	Danish Superliga	0	0	0	0	—		0	0
Lyngby	2023-24	Danish Superliga	7	0	2	0	—		9	0
Lyngby	2024-25	Danish Superliga	18	0	0	0	—		18	0
Lyngby	Total		25	0	2	0	0	0	27	0
Career total			189	0	3	0	0	0	192	0
