= Nicolai Poulsen =

Danish footballer (born 1993)

Personal information
- Full name: Nicolai Søberg Poulsen
- Date of birth: 15 August 1993 (age 33)
- Place of birth: Randers, Denmark
- Height: 1.80 m (5 ft 11 in)
- Position: Midfielder

Team information
- Current team: AGF
- Number: 6

Youth career
- –2003: Helsted-Fremad IF
- 2003–2013: Randers Freja

Senior career*
Years	Team	Apps	(Gls)
2013–2019	Randers FC	159	(4)
2017	→ Sarpsborg 08 (loan)	8	(0)
2019–	AGF	182	(5)

International career
2014	Denmark U21	6	(0)
- * Club domestic league appearances and goals as of 16:36, 11 May 2026 (UTC)

Nicolai Søberg Poulsen (born 15 August 1993) is a Danish professional footballer who plays as a midfielder for Danish Superliga club AGF.

== Club career ==
=== Randers ===
Having progressed through the club's youth system, Poulsen made his first team debut for Randers in the 2012–13 season, ending up with a total of nine appearances.

Poulsen soon established himself as a first team regular, forming the central midfield with Randers' captain Christian Keller in the 2014–15 season.

=== AGF ===
On 3 June 2019, Poulsen joined AGF for the 2019–20 season.

In October 2025, he set the record of most suspensions in Danish Superliga history, taking the record from Rasmus Würtz. In 2026 he won the Danish Championship with the club, the first in 40 years.

== International career ==
In the autumn of 2014, Poulsen made his debut for the Denmark national under-21 football team in a friendly match against the Czech Republic.

On 30 July 2016, Poulsen was selected for the Denmark Olympic national team that was to participate in the 2016 Summer Olympics. However, in a Danish Superliga match against AGF the next day, Poulsen suffered a broken jaw in a head-to-head duel with his former teammate, AGF's Mustafa Amini and was therefore forced to stay at home.

== Honours ==
AGF

- Danish Superliga: 2025–26
