= Frederik Brandhof =

Danish footballer (born 1996)

Personal information
- Full name: Frederik Brandhof
- Date of birth: 5 July 1996 (age 30)
- Place of birth: Skive, Denmark
- Height: 1.82 m (6 ft 0 in)
- Position: Midfielder

Team information
- Current team: Horsens
- Number: 29

Youth career
- Skive
- FK Viborg
- Skive

Senior career*
Years	Team	Apps	(Gls)
2014–2017	Skive	79	(4)
2017–2019	Midtjylland	0	(0)
2017	→ Skive (loan)	15	(2)
2018	→ Skive (loan)	13	(0)
2019–2021	Viborg	68	(12)
2021–2025	AGF	92	(1)
2025–	Horsens	24	(1)

International career
2015	Denmark U19	1	(0)
2015–2016	Denmark U20	2	(0)
- * Club domestic league appearances and goals as of 14:25, 27 July 2026 (UTC)

Frederik Brandhof (born 5 July 1996) is a Danish professional footballer who plays as a midfielder for Danish Superliga club AC Horsens.

== Career ==
=== Skive IK ===
Born in Skive, Brandhof started playing football at Skive IK. He later moved to FK Viborg, where he played for a few seasons, before returning to Skive IK, where he later signed a youth contract in July 2013. And from here, things got trickier.

Brandhof made his debut for Skive in the Danish 2nd Division in the spring of 2014, while he at the age of 17, scored his first goal for the club in a game against Brabrand IF on 28 May 2014. Brandhof was promoted to the first team squad for the 2014–15 season after signing a new two-year deal with the club in June 2014, just as Skive had been promoted to the Danish 1st Division for the 2014–15 season.

Already three months after signing his last contract, Brandhof signed a new contract with Skive in October 2014, this time until June 2017. In his first season in the 1st Division, he played 13 out of 35 games (12 as a substitute, one in the starting lineup). In the following season (2015–16) he became more established player on the team, playing 22 out of 33 matches.

=== FC Midtjylland ===
On 11 April 2017, 20-year old Brandhof signed a four-year deal until June 2021 with Danish Superliga club FC Midtjylland. His contract with Midtjylland would run from July 2017, but initially he would be load out to Skive for the rest of 2017. At the same time, however, he would primarily train with FC Midtjylland.

During his six-month loan spell at Skive, Brandhof made 15 appearances and scored two goals. On 28 January 2018, Skive signed a new loan deal with Brandhof, this time for the rest of the season.

After returning to Midtjylland in the summer 2018, Brandhof got his official debut for Midtjylland in a Danish Cup game against Dalum IF on 26 September 2018. This game became his only official appearances for Midtjylland.

=== Viborg FF ===
On 19 January 2019, Brandhof joined Danish 1st Division club Viborg FF on deal until June 2021. Brandhof made his debut on 10 March 2019 against Hvidovre IF.

Brandhof scored 10 goals and made five assist in 29 league games as a midfielder in the 2019–20, and was also named player of the year in Viborg for the 2019/20 season.

=== AGF ===
On 12 January 2021, it was announced that Brandhof would switch from Viborg FF to Danish Superliga club AGF with effect from the summer of 2021, when the contract with Viborg expired. He signed a contract valid until the end of 2024. Brandhof made his Superliga and AGF debut on 15 August 2021 against F.C. Copenhagen.

=== AC Horsens ===
On 13 June 2025, Brandhof made a move to Danish 1st Division side AC Horsens on a deal until June 2028.

== Personal life ==
Frederik Brandhof's uncle, Rasmus Brandhof, has for several years worked as sports director in Skive IK, while his father, just as his father, Claus Brandhof, has sat on the board of the elite department of the same club.
