= Jacob Andersen (footballer) =

Danish footballer (born 2004)

Personal information
- Full name: Jacob Florentin Andersen
- Date of birth: 26 January 2004 (age 22)
- Place of birth: Galten, Denmark
- Position: Right-back

Team information
- Current team: AGF
- Number: 26

Youth career
- Galten FS
- AGF

Senior career*
Years	Team	Apps	(Gls)
2021–	AGF	42	(0)

International career
2021	Denmark U18	2	(0)
2023	Denmark U19	2	(0)
2023–2024	Denmark U20	3	(0)
2024	Denmark U21	3	(0)
- * Club domestic league appearances and goals as of 16:49, 11 May 2026 (UTC)

Jacob Florentin Andersen (born 26 January 2004) is a Danish professional footballer who plays as a right-back for Danish Superliga club AGF.

== Career ==
=== AGF ===
Born in Galten, Andersen joined AGF at the age of nine from local club Galten FS. Shortly after he turned 17, Andersen began playing with AGF's U-19 team. Andersen did well with the U19s, which earned him his professional debut on 24 May 2021 in the Danish Superliga against FC Midtjylland, where he came on from the bench, playing the last 11 minutes of the game.

In June 2021, Andersen signed a youth contract with AGF. In February 2023, Andersen signed his first professional contract with AGF; a deal until June 2025 and which also included that from summer 2023 he would become a permanent part of the first team squad.

On 19 August 2024, Andersen extended his contract until June 2028. During AGF's training camp in January 2025, Andersen suffered an anterior cruciate ligament injury, which was expected to keep him out for the next 10–12 months.

In the 2025–26 season he won the Danish Championship with the club, the first in 40 years.

== Honours ==
AGF

- Danish Superliga: 2025–26
