= Frederik Tingager =

Danish footballer (born 1993)

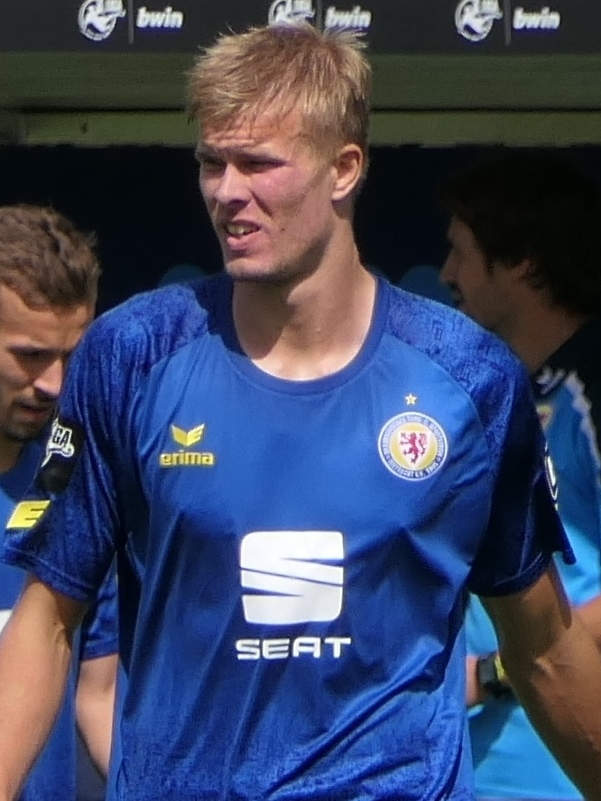
- Tingager with Eintracht Braunschweig in 2018

Personal information
- Full name: Frederik Beyer Tingager
- Date of birth: 22 February 1993 (age 33)
- Place of birth: Tuse, Denmark
- Height: 1.98 m (6 ft 6 in)
- Position: Centre-back

Team information
- Current team: AGF
- Number: 5

Youth career
- 1996–2006: Tuse IF
- 2006–2009: Holbæk B&I
- 2009–2012: Brøndby

Senior career*
Years	Team	Apps	(Gls)
2012–2016	Holbæk B&I (Note: Nordvest FC changed its name back to Holbæk B&I in 2014.)		
2016–2018	OB	49	(3)
2018–2019	Eintracht Braunschweig	24	(1)
2019–	AGF	187	(9)
- * Club domestic league appearances and goals as of 16:38, 11 May 2026 (UTC)

Frederik Beyer Tingager (born 22 February 1993) is a Danish professional footballer who plays as a centre-back for Danish Superliga club AGF.

== Career ==
=== Early career ===
Born in Tuse, Holbæk Municipality, Tingager began his career at Tuse IF and eventually joined the Brøndby IF academy after spending a few years in the youth department of Holbæk B&I. In January 2012, Tingager returned to Holbæk, to play for their first team competing in the third division.

=== OB ===
In January 2016, Tingager joined Danish Superliga club OB after a successful trial. He made his professional debut on 8 May 2016, when OB lost 1–0 to FC Copenhagen. He came to six appearances and one goal that season, as OB finished seventh in the league table. In the 2016–17 season, the club also managed to avoid relegation.

=== Eintracht Braunschweig ===
In January 2018, Tingager moved to Eintracht Braunschweig in Germany. He made 14 appearances and one goal in his first season. The club suffered relegation at the end of the season from the 2. Bundesliga. On 29 December 2018, his contract, which ran until June 2020, was terminated at the end of the year; the team had been in the relegation zone of the 3. Liga since the third matchday.

=== AGF ===
In January 2019, days after agreeing the termination of his contract with Eintracht Braunschweig, Tingager returned to Denmark signing with AGF. He made his debut as a starter on 8 February in AGF's 2–0 league win over Esbjerg fB.

On 27 August 2020, Tingager scored his first goal for AGF, opening the score in a 5–2 victory against Finnish club FC Honka in the UEFA Europa League qualifiers.

Tingager continued as a regular starter in the subsequent seasons, initially under the leadership of head coach David Nielsen, and, since 2022, under Uwe Rösler. He helped AGF to third-place finishes in 2020 and 2023. In 2026 he won the Danish Championship with the club, the first in 40 years. During the season he had however transitioned to be primarily a back-up.

== Honours ==
AGF

- Danish Superliga: 2025–26

Individual

- Danish Superliga Team of the Year: 2024–25
- Danish Superliga Player of the Month: August 2025
