= Mathias Sauer =

Danish footballer (born 2004)

Personal information
- Full name: Mathias Dahl Sauer
- Date of birth: 2 April 2004 (age 22)
- Place of birth: Rønde, Denmark
- Height: 1.81 m (5 ft 11 in)
- Position: Attacking midfielder

Team information
- Current team: Sandefjord
- Number: 18

Youth career
- Thorsager Rønde IF
- AGF
- –2019: Silkeborg
- 2019–2023: AGF

Senior career*
Years	Team	Apps	(Gls)
2021–2025	AGF	7	(0)
2024	→ Haugesund (loan)	27	(1)
2025	→ Egersund (loan)	12	(5)
2025–2026	Egersund	18	(3)
2026	Górnik Zabrze	3	(0)
2026–	Sandefjord	1	(0)

International career
2019	Denmark U16	2	(0)
2023	Denmark U20	2	(0)
- * Club domestic league appearances and goals as of 19:59, 18 July 2026 (UTC)

Mathias Dahl Sauer (born 2 April 2004) is a Danish professional footballer who plays as an attacking midfielder for Eliteserien club Sandefjord.

== Career ==
=== AGF ===
Sauer started playing football at Thorsager Rønde IF (TRIF). He later moved to AGF and then played for Silkeborg IF, before returning to AGF again in July 2019. After returning, 16-year old Sauer became an established played for the U19 team, although his young age.

Sauer did well with the U19s, which earned him his professional debut on 24 May 2021 - just over a month after his 17th birthday - in the Danish Superliga against FC Midtjylland, where he came on from the bench, playing the last 11 minutes of the game. On 6 March 2023, Sauer signed a new deal until June 2026 with AGF, meaning that he would be promoted to the first team squad from the start of the 2023–24 season.

On 3 April 2024, AGF confirmed that they had extended Sauer's contract until June 2027 and that he was simultaneously loaned to Norwegian Eliteserien club FK Haugesund for the rest of the year. Despite a lot of chances, Sauer never made it in Norway and returned to AGF in 2025. It later emerged that Haugesund had wanted Sauer to stay at the club, but that AGF manager, Uwe Rösler, had asked for Sauer to return to the club.

=== Egersunds IK ===
On transfer deadline day in Norway, 27 March 2025, Sauer joined Norwegian First Division club Egersunds IK on a loan deal until June 2025, with an option to buy included. On 19 June 2025, AGF confirmed that the Norwegian club had exercised their option to buy and signed Sauer on a permanent deal lasting three years.

=== Górnik Zabrze ===
On 20 January 2026, Sauer joined Ekstraklasa club Górnik Zabrze on a deal until the end of June 2029, with an option for a one-year extension.

=== Sandefjord ===
Sauer spent six months in Poland before returning to Norway on 16 July 2026, joining Sandefjord on a three-and-a-half-year deal.
