= 2025–26 Danish Superliga =

36th season of Danish Superliga

Superliga
- Season: 2025–26
- Dates: 18 July 2025 – 17 May 2026
- Champions: AGF
- Relegated: Fredericia; Vejle
- Champions League: AGF
- Europa League: Midtjylland
- Conference League: Nordsjælland; Copenhagen
- Matches: 193
- Goals: 599 (3.1 per match)
- Top goalscorer: Franculino Djú (17 goals)
- Best goalkeeper: Patrick Pentz (11 clean sheets)
- Biggest home win: Copenhagen 7–0 Silkeborg (5 April 2026)
- Biggest away win: OB 1–5 AGF (18 August 2025); Randers 1–5 Copenhagen (31 August 2025); Fredericia 0–4 Midtjylland (26 October 2025); Silkeborg 0–4 Midtjylland (22 February 2026)
- Highest scoring: Midtjylland 6–2 Sønderjyske (28 July 2025); AGF 6–2 Viborg (17 May 2026)
- Longest winning run: 8 matches AGF
- Longest unbeaten run: 12 matches AGF
- Longest winless run: 12 matches Vejle
- Longest losing run: 8 matches Fredericia
- Highest attendance: 34,442; Copenhagen 1–0 Brøndby (23 November 2025)
- Lowest attendance: 1,771; Nordsjælland 2–1 Sønderjyske (8 February 2026)
- Total attendance: 1,735,639
- Average attendance: 9,183

The 2025–26 Danish Superliga (officially the 3F Superliga for sponsorship purposes) was the 36th season of the Danish Superliga. Copenhagen entered the season as the defending champions, having secured the 2024–25 title.

The schedule for the first seven matchdays was released on 6 June 2025, with the opening fixture set for 18 July between Viborg and Copenhagen. Between early December and mid-February, the league entered into its standard winter break during which no league fixtures will be played.

On 10 May, in the penultimate matchday, AGF defeated Brøndby 2–0 and Midtjylland drew 0–0 away at Nordsjælland, which meant that AGF had sealed their first league title in 40 years, having last won the division in 1986.

== Teams ==
OB made an immediate return to the Superliga after winning the 2024–25 Danish 1st Division title in a rare appearance at the lower level. Fredericia joined OB in promotion, marking that club's first appearance in the top flight in its existence. Those two teams replaced AaB and Lyngby, which were relegated at the end of the previous season, ending their top flight spells of one and three years respectively.

=== Stadiums and locations ===
Locations of the Danish Superliga 2025–26 teams

Club	Location	Stadium	Turf	Capacity	2024–25 position
AGF	Aarhus	Ceres Park Vejlby	Hybrid	12,000	6th
Brøndby	Brøndby	Brøndby Stadium	Hybrid	28,000	3rd
Copenhagen	Copenhagen	Parken	Hybrid	38,009	1st
Fredericia	Fredericia	Monjasa Park	Natural	6,000	1D, 2nd
Midtjylland	Herning	MCH Arena	Natural	11,809	2nd
Nordsjælland	Farum	Right to Dream Park	Artificial	9,900	5th
OB	Odense	Nature Energy Park	Natural	15,633	1D, 1st
Randers	Randers	Cepheus Park Randers	Natural	11,801	4th
Silkeborg	Silkeborg	JYSK Park	Artificial	10,000	7th
Sønderjyske	Haderslev	Sydbank Park	Natural	10,100	9th
Vejle	Vejle	Vejle Stadion	Natural	11,060	10th
Viborg	Viborg	Energi Viborg Arena	Hybrid	10,000	8th

=== Personnel and sponsoring ===
Note: Flags indicate national team as has been defined under FIFA eligibility rules. Players and Managers may hold more than one non-FIFA nationality. Sponsors are as of the 2024/25 season and will be updated when new kits are revealed.

Team	Head coach	Captain	Kit manufacturer	Shirt sponsor (front)	Shirt sponsor (back)	Shirt sponsor (sleeve)	Shorts sponsor
AGF	(Denmark) Jakob Poulsen	(Denmark) Patrick Mortensen	Craft	Ceres (H)/Bravida (A & T), Arbejdernes Landsbank (H)	Arbejdernes Landsbank (A & T)	Mybanker	Bravida (H)/Faxe Kondi (A & T)
Brøndby	(Wales) Steve Cooper	(Denmark) Daniel Wass	Hummel	None	NTG Nordic Transport	Opendo	None
Copenhagen	(Denmark) Bo Svensson	(Sweden) Viktor Claesson	Adidas	Unibet	Carlsberg	Carlsberg	Unibet
Fredericia	(Denmark) Michael Hansen	(Denmark) Frederik Rieper	Hummel	Monjasa, ComeOn!	Thansen	Fredericia Kommune	None
Midtjylland	(Denmark) Mike Tullberg	(Denmark) Mads Bech Sørensen	Puma	Vestjysk Bank (H)/Arbejdernes Landsbank (A & T), Jack & Jones	Ejner Hessel	AL Finans	Arbejdernes Landsbank
Nordsjælland	(Denmark) Jens Fønsskov Olsen	(Denmark) Mark Brink	Nike	DHL	Arbejdernes Landsbank	Arbejdernes Landsbank	Faxe Kondi
OB	(Germany) Alexander Zorniger	(Denmark) Rasmus Falk	Hummel	Arbejdernes Landsbank	Scan Global Logistics	None	None
Randers	(Denmark) Rasmus Bertelsen	(Netherlands) Wessel Dammers	Puma	Verdo, Sparekassen Kronjylland	Jysk Vin (H)/Gardin Lis (A)	ACTEC Batterier	Klodskassen
Silkeborg	(Denmark) Kent Nielsen	(Denmark) Nicolai Larsen	Adidas	Jysk, Lars Larsen Group	Various	SPORT 24 A/S	None
Sønderjyske	(Denmark) Thomas Nørgaard	(Denmark) Rasmus Vinderslev	Hummel	Sydjysk Sparekasse, Davidsen	Kræftens Bekæmpelse	SPORT 24 A/S	Dansk Fliserens
Vejle	(Denmark) Claus Nørgaard	(Denmark) Thomas Gundelund	Adidas	Arbejdernes Landsbank/Vestjysk Bank	5E Byg (H)/StockGroup A/S (A)	SPORT 24 A/S	Various
Viborg	(Denmark) Nickolai Lund	(Denmark) Jeppe Grønning	Capelli Sport	Peter Larsen Kaffe	None	VillaVilla	Vexa Ejendomskreditselskab

=== Managerial changes ===
Team	Outgoing manager	Manner of departure	Date of vacancy	Position in table	Replaced by	Date of appointment
AGF	(Germany) Uwe Rösler	Sacked	31 May 2025	Pre-season	(Denmark) Jakob Poulsen	20 June 2025
OB	(Denmark) Søren Krogh	Sacked	31 May 2025	Pre-season	(Germany) Alexander Zorniger	31 May 2025
Vejle	(Denmark) Steffen Kielstrup (Denmark) Johnny Mølby	End of contract	31 May 2025	Pre-season	(Croatia) Ivan Prelec	16 June 2025
Viborg	(Denmark) Jakob Poulsen	Signed by AGF	20 June 2025	Pre-season	(Denmark) Nickolai Lund	16 July 2025
Midtjylland	(Denmark) Thomas Thomasberg	Sacked	31 August 2025	2nd	(Denmark) Mike Tullberg	2 September 2025
Brøndby	(Denmark) Frederik Birk	Sacked	9 September 2025	4th	(Wales) Steve Cooper	9 September 2025
Vejle	(Croatia) Ivan Prelec	Sacked	3 November 2025	12th	(Denmark) Morten Bisgaard (Denmark) Steffen Kielstrup (caretakers)	3 November 2025
Vejle	(Denmark) Morten Bisgaard (Denmark) Steffen Kielstrup (caretakers)	End of caretaker spell	18 December 2025	12th	(Denmark) Claus Nørgaard	18 December 2025
Copenhagen	(Denmark) Jacob Neestrup	Mutual agreement	29 March 2026	8th	(Denmark) Bo Svensson	30 March 2026

== Regular season ==
=== League table ===
Pos	Team	Pld	W	D	L	GF	GA	GD	Pts	Qualification
1	AGF	22	15	5	2	46	23	+23	50	Qualification for the Championship round
2	Midtjylland	22	13	7	2	58	23	+35	46	Qualification for the Championship round
3	Sønderjyske	22	10	6	6	34	28	+6	36	Qualification for the Championship round
4	Brøndby	22	10	4	8	31	22	+9	34	Qualification for the Championship round
5	Viborg	22	10	3	9	37	35	+2	33	Qualification for the Championship round
6	Nordsjælland	22	10	1	11	37	39	−2	31	Qualification for the Championship round
7	Copenhagen	22	8	5	9	35	34	+1	29	Qualification for the Relegation round
8	OB	22	7	6	9	36	46	−10	27	Qualification for the Relegation round
9	Randers	22	7	5	10	22	27	−5	26	Qualification for the Relegation round
10	Fredericia	22	7	3	12	30	49	−19	24	Qualification for the Relegation round
11	Silkeborg	22	5	4	13	24	45	−21	19	Qualification for the Relegation round
12	Vejle	22	3	5	14	26	45	−19	14	Qualification for the Relegation round

Source: Danish Football Association (in Danish), Soccerway
Rules for classification: 1) Points; 2) Goal difference; 3) Goals scored; 4) Away goals scored; 5) Play-off (played on neutral ground if determining teams for different rounds); 6) Draw.

=== Results ===
Home \ Away	AGF	BRO	COP	FRE	MID	NOR	OB	RAN	SIL	SON	VEJ	VIB
AGF		1–0	2–0	4–1	0–0	1–0	2–1	1–2	3–1	2–3	1–0	5–2
Brøndby	3–3		1–0	1–3	1–3	2–0	5–1	0–0	3–0	0–0	2–1	0–2
Copenhagen	2–3	1–0		3–2	1–1	1–2	1–1	1–2	3–3	0–2	2–0	0–0
Fredericia	1–1	0–2	0–2		0–4	2–3	1–3	1–0	2–1	3–2	1–1	0–3
Midtjylland	1–1	0–0	2–1	3–3		6–0	3–3	2–1	4–2	6–2	5–1	2–0
Nordsjælland	1–2	0–1	1–3	5–0	1–0		2–4	1–0	5–0	2–1	3–3	1–0
OB	1–5	1–4	2–2	3–2	1–4	1–2		3–2	1–1	1–1	3–0	3–1
Randers	1–2	0–2	1–5	1–2	0–2	3–0	0–0		1–0	0–0	2–0	2–1
Silkeborg	0–2	0–2	3–1	0–2	0–4	4–2	2–1	0–0		0–2	1–1	0–1
Sønderjyske	1–1	2–0	1–2	3–0	2–1	3–2	1–0	0–1	2–1		2–1	2–2
Vejle	1–2	2–1	2–0	2–3	0–2	0–3	4–0	1–1	1–2	2–2		1–2
Viborg	1–2	1–0	2–3	2–1	3–3	2–1	1–2	3–2	2–3	1–0	5–2	

Source: Soccerway
Legend: Blue = home team win; Yellow = draw; Red = away team win.

== Championship round ==
=== League table ===
Points and goals carried over in full from the regular season.

Pos	Team	Pld	W	D	L	GF	GA	GD	Pts	
1	AGF (C)	32	19	10	3	62	32	+30	67	Qualification for the Champions League second qualifying round
2	Midtjylland	32	16	12	4	72	36	+36	60	Qualification for the Europa League second qualifying round (Note: The 2025–26 Danish Cup winners (Midtjylland) qualify for the Europa League second qualifying round.)
3	Nordsjælland	32	15	5	12	51	46	+5	50	Qualification for the Conference League second qualifying round
4	Brøndby	32	13	6	13	44	35	+9	45	Qualification for the European play-off match
5	Viborg	32	13	5	14	49	51	−2	44	
6	Sønderjyske	32	12	8	12	44	49	−5	44	

Source: Danish Football Association (in Danish), Soccerway
Rules for classification: 1) Points; 2) Goal difference; 3) Goals scored; 4) Away goals scored; 5) Play-off (played on neutral ground if determining teams for different rounds); 6) Draw.
(C) Champions

=== Results ===
Home \ Away	AGF	BRO	MID	NOR	SON	VIB
AGF		0–0	0–0	1–1	2–1	6–2
Brøndby	0–2		1–2	1–1	6–0	0–1
Midtjylland	2–1	2–3		0–1	2–2	3–3
Nordsjælland	1–1	2–1	0–0		2–0	2–1
Sønderjyske	1–1	3–0	1–2	1–4		0–2
Viborg	1–2	0–1	1–1	1–0	0–1	

Source: Soccerway
Legend: Blue = home team win; Yellow = draw; Red = away team win.

== Relegation round ==
=== League table ===
Points and goals carried over in full from the regular season.

Pos	Team	Pld	W	D	L	GF	GA	GD	Pts	
1	Copenhagen (O)	32	15	6	11	67	44	+23	51	Qualification for the European play-off match
2	OB	32	11	8	13	51	60	−9	41	
3	Silkeborg	32	10	6	16	41	67	−26	36	
4	Randers	32	9	8	15	33	47	−14	35	
5	Fredericia (R)	32	9	7	16	45	68	−23	34	Relegation to 1st Division
6	Vejle (R)	32	5	9	18	36	60	−24	24	Relegation to 1st Division

Source: Danish Football Association (in Danish), Soccerway
Rules for classification: 1) Points; 2) Goal difference; 3) Goals scored; 4) Away goals scored; 5) Play-off (played on neutral ground if determining teams for different rounds); 6) Draw.
(O) Play-off winners; (R) Relegated

=== Results ===
Home \ Away	COP	FRE	OB	RAN	SIL	VEJ
Copenhagen		1–2	2–1	5–0	7–0	3–0
Fredericia	3–3		0–2	0–3	4–1	2–2
OB	2–1	1–0		3–1	2–3	0–1
Randers	1–2	2–2	2–2		0–3	1–0
Silkeborg	0–4	2–2	3–1	2–0		1–1
Vejle	1–4	2–0	1–1	1–1	1–2	

Source: Soccerway
Legend: Blue = home team win; Yellow = draw; Red = away team win.

== European play-offs ==
The 4th-placed team of the championship round advanced to a play-off match against the winning team of the qualification round (no. 7) in a single-leg tie, with the team from the championship round as hosts. The winner earned a place in the Conference League second qualifying round. Initially intended to be played on 24 May, due to an agreement with local police as a result of Brøndby's qualification for the match against Copenhagen (i.e. the Copenhagen derby), it was moved to 21 May.

=== European play-off match ===
21 May 2026
18:30 CEST (UTC+2)

Brøndby	1–3 (a.e.t.)	Copenhagen
Frøkjær 80'	Report	Buta 77'; Moukoko 103', 120+3'

Brøndby Stadium, Brøndbyvester
Attendance: 26,408
Referee: Morten Krogh

== Season statistics ==
=== Top scorers ===
Rank	Player	Club	Goals
1	(Guinea-Bissau) Franculino Djú	Midtjylland	17
2	(Denmark) Tonni Adamsen	Silkeborg	14
3	(Sweden) Jordan Larsson	Copenhagen	13
4	(Denmark) Tobias Bech	AGF	12
5	(Germany) Noah Ganaus	OB	11
5	(New Zealand) Callum McCowatt	Silkeborg	11
5	(Germany) Youssoufa Moukoko	Copenhagen	11
8	(Germany) Fiete Arp	OB	10
9	(Norway) Kristian Arnstad	AGF	9
9	(Denmark) Patrick Mortensen	AGF	9
9	(Turkey) Aral Şimşir	Midtjylland	9

==== Hat-tricks ====
Player	For	Against	Result	Date
(Guinea-Bissau) Franculino Djú	Midtjylland	Sønderjyske	6–2 (H)	28 July 2025
(Denmark) Tonni Adamsen	Silkeborg	Nordsjælland	4–2 (H)	10 August 2025
(New Zealand) Callum McCowatt	Silkeborg	Copenhagen	3–3 (A)	21 September 2025
(Suriname) Jay-Roy Grot	OB	Copenhagen	4–2 (A)	2 November 2025
(Brazil) Júnior Brumado	Midtjylland	OB	4–1 (A)	15 February 2026
(Germany) Youssoufa Moukoko	Copenhagen	Silkeborg	7–0 (H)	5 April 2026

=== Clean sheets ===
Rank	Player	Club	Clean sheets
1	(Austria) Patrick Pentz	Brøndby	11
2	(Denmark) Andreas Hansen	Nordsjælland	9
2	(Denmark) Jesper Hansen	AGF	9
2	(Denmark) Lucas Lund	Viborg	9
2	(Iceland) Elías Rafn Ólafsson	Midtjylland	9
6	(Australia) Paul Izzo	Randers	8
6	(Croatia) Dominik Kotarski	Copenhagen	8
8	(Denmark) Marcus Bundgaard	Sønderjyske	7
9	(Norway) Viljar Myhra	OB	4
10	(Denmark) Nicolai Larsen	Silkeborg	3

=== Discipline ===
==== Player ====
- Most yellow cards: 10
  - (England) Luis Binks (Brøndby)
- Most red cards: 2
  - (Georgia (country)) Giorgi Tabatadze (Vejle)

==== Club ====
- Most yellow cards: 68
  - Midtjylland
- Fewest yellow cards: 34
  - Silkeborg
- Most red cards: 5
  - Brøndby
  - Midtjylland
- Fewest red cards: 0
  - AGF
  - Viborg

== Awards ==
=== Monthly awards ===
Month	Player of the Month		Young Player of the Month		Goal of the Month	
Month	Player	Club	Player	Club	Player	Club
July	(Guinea-Bissau) Franculino Djú	Midtjylland	(Denmark) Clement Bischoff	Brøndby	(Guinea-Bissau) Franculino Djú	Midtjylland
August	(Denmark) Frederik Tingager	AGF	(Ghana) Caleb Yirenkyi	Nordsjælland	(Sweden) Jordan Larsson	Copenhagen
September	(Norway) Kristian Arnstad	AGF	(Denmark) Noah Nartey	Brøndby	(South Korea) Cho Gue-sung	Midtjylland
October	(Denmark) Philip Billing	Midtjylland	(Denmark) Noah Nartey	Brøndby	(Guinea-Bissau) Franculino Djú	Midtjylland
November	(Denmark) Thomas Jørgensen	Viborg	(Denmark) Thomas Jørgensen	Viborg	(Denmark) Tobias Bech	AGF
February	(Turkey) Aral Şimşir	Midtjylland	(Ghana) Caleb Yirenkyi	Nordsjælland	(Iraq) Kevin Yakob	AGF
March	(Denmark) Sami Jalal	Viborg	(Denmark) Sofus Johannesen	Fredericia	(Egypt) Ibrahim Adel	Nordsjælland
April	(Denmark) Henrik Dalsgaard	AGF	(Denmark) Marcus McCoy	OB	(Germany) Fiete Arp	OB
May	(Denmark) Henrik Dalsgaard	AGF	(Denmark) Olti Hyseni	Sønderjyske	(Germany) Fiete Arp	OB

=== Annual awards ===
Award	Winner	Club
Player of the Year	(Turkey) Aral Şimşir	Midtjylland
Young Player of the Year	(Ghana) Caleb Yirenkyi	Nordsjælland
Goal of the Year	(Iraq) Kevin Yakob	AGF

Team of the Year
Pos.	Player	Club
GK	(Iceland) Elías Ólafsson	Midtjylland
DF	(South Africa) Gift Links	AGF
DF	(Denmark) Mads Bech Sørensen	Midtjylland
DF	(Sweden) Felix Beijmo	AGF
DF	(Denmark) Henrik Dalsgaard	AGF
MF	(Turkey) Aral Şimşir	Midtjylland
MF	(Ghana) Caleb Yirenkyi	Nordsjælland
MF	(Denmark) Thomas Jørgensen	Viborg
MF	(Denmark) Tobias Bech	AGF
FW	(Guinea-Bissau) Franculino Djú	Midtjylland
FW	(Denmark) Tonni Adamsen	Silkeborg

== Attendances ==
Danish Superliga clubs listed by average home league attendance:

Pos	Club	Average attendance
1	FC København	24,487
2	Brøndby IF	20,295
3	FC Midtjylland	10,155
4	OB	9,904
5	AGF	9,244
6	Vejle BK	6,588
7	Viborg FF	6,350
8	SønderjyskE	5,938
9	Randers FC	5,005
10	Silkeborg IF	4,569
11	FC Nordsjælland	4,218
12	FC Fredericia	3,602

== See also ==
- 2025–26 Danish 1st Division
- 2025–26 Danish 2nd Division
- 2025–26 Danish 3rd Division
- 2025–26 Denmark Series
- 2025–26 Danish Cup
