= 2026–27 Viborg FF season =

Danish football club season

Viborg FF
2026–27 season
- Players before a match in October 2026
- Chairman: Kim Nielsen
- Head coach: Nickolai Lund
- Stadium: Energi Viborg Arena
- Danish Superliga: 3rd
- Danish Cup: Third round
- Top goalscorer: League: Dorian Jr. (6); All: Dorian Jr. (7)
- Highest home attendance: 9,212; (vs Midtjylland, 19 October 2026)
- Lowest home attendance: 5,237; (vs Randers, 22 November 2026)
- Average home league attendance: 6,800
- Biggest win: 4–0; (vs Copenhagen, 23 August 2026)
- Biggest defeat: 0–2; (vs Lyngby, 4 September 2026)
Home colours	Away colours

The 2026–27 season is the 130th season in the history of Viborg FF, and their sixth consecutive season in the Danish Superliga, the top level of football in Denmark. The team will compete in the Danish Cup, the country's official knockout tournament.

The club is managed by head coach Nickolai Lund, who is in his second season in charge, having been named to his position in July 2025. The 2025–26 season saw Viborg finish in 5th in the Danish Superliga. The club also reached the semi-final of the 2025–26 Danish Cup, before being eliminated by Copenhagen.

== Pre-season and friendlies ==
Danish Superliga defending champions AGF announced their pre-season schedule on 22 May 2026, the day following the end of the 2025–26 season. In the announcement, the club revealed that AGF and Viborg would play a friendly on 27 June. Additional friendlies were announced by AaB, to be hosted at AaB's training facility in Aalborg on 3 July, and English club Notts County, scheduled for 11 July. An additional friendly was set for 16 July against Copenhagen at Copenhagen's training facility.

During a three week international break between late September to early October, Viborg arranged a friendly against 2. Bundesliga club Holstein Kiel to take place on 3 October in Malente, Germany.

27 June 2026	AGF	1–1	Viborg	Fredensvang, Aarhus
13:00 CEST (UTC+2)	Jørgensen 17'	Report	Grønning 22'

3 July 2026	AaB	3–1	Viborg	Aalborg
13:00 CEST (UTC+2)	Kaasa 41', 50'; Nwadike 53'	Report	Olsen 10'

11 July 2026	Viborg	2–0	Notts County	Viborg
13:00 CEST (UTC+2)	Dorian Jr. 50', 57'	Report		Stadium: Energi Viborg Arena; Attendance: 1,608

16 July 2026	Copenhagen	2–1	Viborg	Copenhagen
14:00 CEST (UTC+2)	Elyounoussi 45'; Delaney 65'		Bundgaard 9'

3 October 2026	Holstein Kiel	3–1	Viborg	Uwe Seeler Fußball Park
14:00 CEST (UTC+2)	Harres 53'; Therkelsen 78'; Tasdelen 90+2'	Report	Jalal 39'	Stadium: Malente, Germany

== Danish Superliga ==
The schedule for the 2026–27 Danish Superliga season was unveiled by the league on 3 June 2026. Viborg opened the new Superliga season on Friday, 24 July against OB in Viborg. With a goal from midfielder Thomas Jørgensen in the 56th minute, Viborg won their opening match 1–0. In the second match of the season, Viborg travelled to Brøndbyvester to take on Brøndby on 2 August. Olti Hyseni, who joined Brøndby on 31 July, scored a late winning goal to give his side the 1–0 win over Viborg. Viborg's next game was in Haderslev versus Sønderjyske—a game that finished scoreless after a goal from Thomas Jørgensen was ruled offside in the opening minutes. In week four, Viborg returned home to face defending Superliga champions AGF and Viborg's former coach, Jakob Poulsen. Mads Søndergaard scored two goals to secure three points for Viborg in a 2–1 victory. Copenhagen was the next team to travel to Viborg when the two teams met on 23 August. An early own goal from Birger Meling gave the hosts a 1–0 lead in the opening minute. The lead was doubled in the 8th minute when Dorian Jr. scored his first goal of the season, before Asker Beck further extended the lead in the 16th minute to make it 3–0 in Viborg's favour. The final goal of the match came from Charly Nouck in the 68th minute to further secure Viborg's win over Copenhagen by a score of 4–0. The win moved Viborg into first place in the Danish Superliga. Viborg finished August with a trip to Horsens on 28 August. The three goalscorers from Viborg's previous game against Copenhagen repeated, with goals from Dorian Jr, Nouck, and Beck. Horsens scored two goals in the second half: however, Viborg would hold on for a 3–2 win.

Lyngby travelled to Viborg to begin September for both clubs in the Superliga. Ísak Thorvaldsson scored for the third consecutive match to give Lyngby a 1–0 lead. Simon Colyn doubled the lead in the 62nd minute following a penalty kick. Viborg applied pressure late in the match with an attacking focus, but did not score as Lyngby won their first match of the season. Viborg bounced back in their next match, drawing 1–1 at Silkeborg after falling behind early due to a Lucas Riisgaard goal in the 11th minute. Asker Beck scored his third goal in four games to secure a point for Viborg.

=== Results ===
18 July 2026 1	Viborg	1–0	OB	Viborg
19:00 CEST (UTC+2)	Thomas Jørgensen 56'	Report		Stadium: Energi Viborg Arena; Attendance: 6,111; Referee: Frederik Veis Svendsen

2 August 2026 2	Brøndby	1–0	Viborg	Brøndbyvester
16:00 CEST (UTC+2)	Hyseni 80'	Report		Stadium: Brøndby Stadium; Attendance: 23,841; Referee: Jakob Alexander Sundberg

7 August 2026 3	Sønderjyske	0–0	Viborg	Haderslev
19:00 CEST (UTC+2)		Report		Stadium: Sydbank Park; Attendance: 4,024; Referee: Michael Tykgaard

14 August 2026 4	Viborg	2–1	AGF	Viborg
19:00 CEST (UTC+2)	Søndergaard 11', 60'	Report	Emmery 31'	Stadium: Energi Viborg Arena; Attendance: 8,192; Referee: Mikkel Redder

23 August 2026 5	Viborg	4–0	Copenhagen	Viborg
18:00 CEST (UTC+2)	Meling 1' (o.g.); Dorian Jr. 8'; Beck 16'; Nouck 68'	Report		Stadium: Energi Viborg Arena; Attendance: 7,889; Referee: Jakob Karlsen

28 August 2026 6	Horsens	2–3	Viborg	Horsens
19:00 CEST (UTC+2)	Ehibhatiomhan 47'; Miličević 71'	Report	Dorian Jr. 34'; Nouck 45+1'; Beck 55'	Stadium: Hybel Arena Horsens; Attendance: 3,168; Referee: Svend Funder

4 September 2026 7	Viborg	0–2	Lyngby	Viborg
19:00 CEST (UTC+2)		Report	Þorvaldsson 32'; Colyn 62' (pen.)	Stadium: Energi Viborg Arena; Attendance: 6,047; Referee: Morten Krogh

13 September 2026 8	Silkeborg	1–1	Viborg	Silkeborg
14:00 CEST (UTC+2)	Riisgaard 11'	Report	Beck 56'	Stadium: JYSK Park; Attendance: 5,112; Referee: Michael Tykgaard

20 September 2026 9	Viborg	4–1	Nordsjælland	Viborg
18:00 CEST (UTC+2)	Søndergaard 16'; Dorian Jr. 33'; Nouck 41'; Kleis-Kristoffersen 81'	Report	Lind 26'	Stadium: Energi Viborg Arena; Attendance: 5,624; Referee: Lasse Graagaard

11 October 2026 10	Randers	0–2	Viborg	Randers
14:00 CEST (UTC+2)		Report	Dorian Jr. 26'; Friðriksson 82'	Stadium: Cepheus Park Randers; Referee: Frederik Svendsen

19 October 2026 11	Viborg	1–2	Midtjylland	Viborg
17:00 CEST (UTC+2)	Dorian Jr. 59'	Report	Kristensen 51'; Billing 66'	Stadium: Energi Viborg Arena; Attendance: 9,212; Referee: Sandi Putros

25 October 2026 12	AGF	2–1	Viborg	Risskov
17:00 CET (UTC+1)	Emmery 8'; Bech 56'	Report	Giulio 81'	Stadium: Ceres Park Vejlby; Attendance: 8,225; Referee: Mikkel Redder

1 November 2026 13	Viborg	1–0	Horsens	Viborg
17:00 CET (UTC+1)	Dorian Jr. 67'	Report		Stadium: Energi Viborg Arena; Attendance: 6,095; Referee: Aydin Uslu

7 November 2026 14	OB	1–2	Viborg	Odense
18:00 CET (UTC+1)	Arp 68'	Report	Søndergaard 11'; Kirkegaard 45'	Stadium: Nature Energy Park; Referee: Jakob Kehlet

22 November 2026 15	Viborg	0–0	Randers	Viborg
14:00 CET (UTC+1)		Report		Stadium: Energi Viborg Arena; Attendance: 5,237; Referee: Jonas Hansen

=== League table ===
Pos	Team	Pld	W	D	L	GF	GA	GD	Pts	Qualification
1	Copenhagen	14	10	2	2	29	12	+17	32	Qualification for the Championship round
2	Midtjylland	14	9	5	0	29	17	+12	32	Qualification for the Championship round
3	Viborg	14	8	2	4	22	13	+9	26	Qualification for the Championship round
4	Nordsjælland	14	6	5	3	26	18	+8	23	Qualification for the Championship round
5	Brøndby	14	7	1	6	23	21	+2	22	Qualification for the Championship round

Updated to match(es) played on 20 November 2026. Source: Danish Football Association (in Danish), Soccerway
Rules for classification: 1) Points; 2) Goal difference; 3) Goals scored; 4) Away goals scored; 5) Play-off (played on neutral ground if determining teams for different rounds); 6) Draw.

== Danish Cup ==
=== Results ===
25 September 2026 Third round	Brabrand	2–1	Viborg	Brabrand
16:30 CEST (UTC+2)	Frandsen 10'; Jørgensen 44'	Report	Dorian Jr. 51' (pen.)	Stadium: Brabrand Stadion

== Squad statistics ==
As of 22 November 2026

No.	Pos	Player	Superliga		Danish Cup		Total	
No.	Pos	Player	Apps	Goals	Apps	Goals	Apps	Goals
1	GK	(Denmark) Lucas Lund	0	0	1	0	1	0
2	DF	(Tunisia) Mohamed Iyadh Riahi	0	0	0	0	0	0
3	DF	(Iceland) Valgeir Lunddal Friðriksson	6	1	0	0	6	1
4	DF	(Denmark) Lukas Kirkegaard	15	1	1	0	16	1
5	DF	(Slovenia) Žan Zaletel	13	0	0	0	13	0
6	MF	(Denmark) Mads Søndergaard	14	4	1	0	15	4
7	FW	(France) Yonis Njoh	0	0	0	0	0	0
8	MF	(Denmark) Asker Beck	15	3	0	0	15	3
9	FW	(Netherlands) Tim Freriks	0	0	0	0	0	0
10	FW	(Denmark) Sami Jalal	14	0	1	0	15	0
11	FW	(Denmark) Charly Nouck	15	3	0	0	15	3
13	MF	(Denmark) Jeppe Grønning	15	0	1	0	16	0
17	FW	(Somalia) Osman Addo	0	0	0	0	0	0
18	MF	(Norway) Ruben Alte	9	0	1	0	10	0
19	FW	(Equatorial Guinea) Dorian Jr.	15	6	1	1	16	7
20	DF	(Denmark) Kasper Kiilerich	15	0	0	0	15	0
23	DF	(Denmark) Oliver Bundgaard	15	0	1	0	16	0
24	DF	(Kenya) Daniel Anyembe	9	0	0	0	9	0
25	FW	(Brazil) Giulio	4	1	1	0	5	1
26	DF	(Denmark) Hjalte Bidstrup	11	0	0	0	11	0
28	MF	(Ivory Coast) Lasso Coulibaly	5	0	0	0	5	0
29	FW	(Trinidad and Tobago) Roald Mitchell	2	0	1	0	3	0
33	MF	(Denmark) Frederik Damkjer	4	0	0	0	4	0
34	MF	(Denmark) Philip Keller	12	0	1	0	13	0
36	FW	(Denmark) Adam Kleis-Kristoffersen	14	1	1	0	15	1
38	DF	(Denmark) Emil Monrad	1	0	0	0	1	0
41	DF	(Denmark) Andreas Søndergaard	0	0	1	0	1	0
Own goals			—	0	—	0	–	0
Players who departed mid-season
10	MF	(Denmark) Thomas Jørgensen	4	1	0	0	4	1
21	MF	(France) Bilal Brahimi	5	0	0	0	5	0
30	DF	(Slovenia) Srđan Kuzmić	6	0	0	0	6	0

== Transfers ==
Ruben Alte joined the club from Norwegian club Viking on a season-long loan.

Thomas Jørgensen was sold to Ligue 1 club Toulouse for a reported fee of kr. 57,500,000.

=== In ===
Date	Pos.	Nat.	Name	Club	Fee	Ref.
15 June 2026	GK	(Denmark)	Kasper Kiilerich	end of loan		
6 July 2026	DF	(Tunisia)	Mohamed Iyadh Riahi	(Tunisia) Stade Tunisien	undisclosed (Note: Reported as kr. 880,000)	
12 August 2026	DF	(Iceland)	Valgeir Lunddal Friðriksson	unattached	free	
25 August 2026	FW	(Brazil)	Giulio	(Brazil) Ceará	undisclosed (Note: Reported as kr. 5,200,000)	

=== Out ===
Date	Pos.	Nat.	Name	Club	Fee	Ref.
15 June 2026	MF	(Germany)	Jean-Manuel Mbom	end of contract		
15 June 2026	MF	(Iceland)	Ísak Andri Sigurgeirsson	end of loan		
15 June 2026	DF	(Denmark)	Mikkel Løndal	(Denmark) Hobro	undisclosed	
8 July 2026	DF	(Croatia)	Stipe Radić	(Hungary) MTK Budapest	undisclosed	
15 July 2026	GK	(Montenegro)	Filip Đukić	(Denmark) Hvidovre	undisclosed	
19 August 2026	MF	(Denmark)	Thomas Jørgensen	(France) Toulouse	undisclosed (Note: Reported as kr. 57,500,000)	
31 August 2026	DF	(Slovenia)	Srđan Kuzmić	(France) Lorient	undisclosed (Note: Reported as kr. 22,500,000)	

=== Loan in ===
Date	Pos.	Nat.	Name	Club	Duration	Ref.
1 September 2026	MF	(Norway)	Ruben Alte	(Norway) Viking	15 June 2027	
2 September 2026	FW	(Trinidad and Tobago)	Roald Mitchell	(United States) New York Red Bulls	15 June 2027	
2 September 2026	MF	(Ivory Coast)	Lasso Coulibaly	(France) Auxerre	15 June 2027	

=== Loan out ===
Date	Pos.	Nat.	Name	Club	Duration	Ref.
4 August 2026	MF	(Netherlands)	Mees Hoedemakers	(Netherlands) Almere City FC	15 June 2027	
31 August 2026	FW	(France)	Bilal Brahimi	(France) Pau FC	15 June 2027	
1 September 2026	MF	(Somalia)	Osman Addo	(Sweden) Helsingborgs	1 January 2027	
