= 2022–23 FC Midtjylland season =

FC Midtjylland
2022–23 season
- Owner: Matthew Benham
- Chairman: Rasmus Ankersen
- Manager: Thomas Thomasberg
- Stadium: MCH Arena
- Superliga: 7th (Qualified for 2023-24 UEFA Europa Conference League)
- Danish Cup: Round of 16
- UEFA Champions League: Third qualifying round
- UEFA Europa League: Knock-out round play-offs
- Top goalscorer: League: Gustav Isaksen (18); All: Gustav Isaksen (22)
- Highest home attendance: 10,911 (18 Sep 2022 vs. Copenhagen)
- Lowest home attendance: 6,912 (22 July 2022 vs. Silkeborg)
- Average home league attendance: 8,663
- Biggest win: 6–0 (19 Oct 2022 vs. FA 2000)
- Biggest defeat: 0–4 (23 Feb 2023 vs. Sporting CP)
Home colours	Away colours	Third colours

The 2022–23 season is FC Midtjylland's 24th season of existence, and their 22nd consecutive season in the Danish Superliga, the top tier of football in Denmark. As a result of the club's runner-up finish in the 2021–22 Danish Superliga, it competed in the 2022–23 UEFA Champions League through the Third Qualifying Round, and subsequently competed in the 2022-23 UEFA Europa League, advancing to the Knockout Round Play-offs.

== Squad ==
As of 24 March 2023

No.	Name	Nat	Position	Since	Date of birth	Signed from
Goalkeepers
1	Jonas Lössl	(Denmark)	GK	2021	1 February 1989	(England) Everton F.C.
16	Elías Rafn Ólafsson	(Iceland)	GK	2020	11 March 2000	(Denmark) FC Midtjylland U19
30	Mark Ugboh	(Nigeria)	GK	2022	3 January 2004	(Denmark) FC Midtjylland U19
Defenders
4	Stefan Gartenmann	(Denmark)	DF	2022	2 February 1997	(Denmark) SønderjyskE
6	Joel Andersson	(Sweden)	DF	2018	11 November 1996	(Sweden) BK Häcken
14	Henrik Dalsgaard (captain)	(Denmark)	DF	2021	27 July 1989	(England) Brentford F.C.
17	Mads Døhr Thychosen	(Denmark)	DF	2022	27 June 1997	(Denmark) FC Nordsjælland
22	Pontus Texel	(Denmark)	DF	2022	27 February 2004	(Denmark) Homegrown
29	Paulinho	(Brazil)	DF	2019	3 January 1995	(Brazil) Bahia
55	Victor Bak Jensen	(Denmark)	DF	2021	3 October 2003	(Denmark) Homegrown
73	Juninho	(Brazil)	DF	2021	1 February 1995	(Brazil) Esporte Clube Bahia
Midfielders
5	Emiliano Martínez	(Uruguay)	MF	2022	17 August 1999	(Brazil) Red Bull Bragantino
8	Kristoffer Olsson	(Sweden)	MF	2022	30 June 1995	(Belgium) Anderlecht
10	Emam Ashour	(Egypt)	MF	2023	20 February 1998	(Egypt) Zamalek
20	Valdemar Andreasen	(Denmark)	MF	2022	5 January 2005	(Denmark) Homegrown
24	Oliver Sørensen	(Denmark)	MF	2019	10 March 2022	(Denmark) Homegrown
35	Charles	(Brazil)	MF	2021	19 June 1996	(Brazil) Ceará
37	Armin Gigović	(Sweden)	MF	2023	6 April 2002	(Russia) Rostov
Forwards
7	Pione Sisto	(Denmark) (South Sudan)	MF	2020	4 February 1995	(Spain) Celta de Vigo
11	Gustav Isaksen	(Denmark)	MF	2019	19 April 2001	(Denmark) Homegrown
18	Edward Chilufya	(Zambia)	MF	2022	17 September 1999	(Sweden) Djurgårdens IF
25	Astrit Selmani	(Kosovo) (Sweden)	MF	2023	13 May 1997	(Israel) Hapoel Be'er Sheva
39	Juan Felipe Moreno	(Colombia)	FW	2022	21 September 2002	(Denmark) Homegrown
47	Frederik Heiselberg	(Denmark)	FW	2021	11 February 2023	(Denmark) Homegrown
58	Aral Şimşir	(Denmark)	FW	2021	19 June 2022	(Denmark) Homegrown
74	Júnior Brumado	(Brazil)	FW	2019	15 May 1999	(Brazil) EC Bahia

=== Out on loan ===
Note: Flags indicate national team as defined under FIFA eligibility rules; some limited exceptions apply. Players may hold more than one non-FIFA nationality.

No.	Pos.	Nation	Player
—	DF	DEN	Oliver Olsen (at Fredericia until 30 June 2023)
—	GK	DEN	Valdemar Birksø (at Fredericia until 30 June 2023)
—	FW	BRA	Marrony (at Fluminense until 30 June 2023)
—	DF	CIV	Ousmane Diomande (at Mafra until 30 June 2023)

== Non-competitive ==
=== Pre-season friendlies ===
25 June 2022 Friendly	Midtjylland	3–2	OB	Tarm
14:00 CEST	Sisto 50' (Heiselberg); Lind 58' (Heiselberg); Moses 90'	FCM Report	Fenger 23'; Horneman 36'	Stadium: Tarm Stadium; Attendance: 500

30 June 2022 Friendly	Midtjylland	2–1	AaB	Vildbjerg
14:00 CEST	Paulinho 31'; Kaba 82'	FCM Report	Makarić 81'	Stadium: Vildbjerg Stadium

9 July 2022 Friendly	K.A.A. Gent (Belgium)	2–1	Midtjylland	Ghent, Belgium
19:30 CEST	Castro-Montes 55'; Tissoudali 78'	FCM Report	Onyedika 30'; Evander (yellow card) 41'	Stadium: Ghelamco Arena

=== Mid-season friendlies ===
21 January 2023 Friendly	St. Pauli (Germany)	0–0	Midtjylland	Hamburg, Germany
12:30 CEST				Stadium: Millerntor-Stadion

27 January 2023 Friendly	Midtjylland	4–2	OB	Herning
12:00 CEST	Olsson 14' (Heiselberg); Heiselberg 32' (Byskov) 42' (Andersson); Isaksen 60' (Sørensen)	Report	Tongya 112' (pen); Muçolli 117'	Stadium: Herning Fremad's Kunstgræsbane 1

=== Atlantic Cup ===
6 February 2023	Midtjylland	1–0	(South Korea) Ulsan Hyundai	Portugal
18:00 GMT	Olsson 48'	Report	Joo Min-kyu (penalty missed) 26'	Stadium: Estadio Algarve

10 February 2022	Midtjylland	1–1 (4–3 p)	(Sweden) Elfsborg	Albufeira, Portugal
18:00 GMT	Heiselberg 90'	Report	Bernhardsson 36'	Stadium: Estádio Municipal de Albufeira

== Competitive ==
=== Competition record ===
Competition	Record							
Competition	G	W	D	L	GF	GA	GD	Win %
Danish Superliga	32	13	12	7	55	39	+16	40.63
Danish Cup	2	1	0	1	7	3	+4	50.00
UEFA Champions League	4	0	2	2	4	9	−5	0.00
UEFA Europa League	8	2	3	3	13	13	+0	25.00
Total	46	16	17	13	78	64	+14	34.78

Last updated: 3 June 2023.
Source: Competitive matches

=== Danish Superliga ===
==== Regular season ====
Pos	Team	Pld	W	D	L	GF	GA	GD	Pts	Qualification
6	Brøndby	22	8	6	8	32	34	−2	30	Qualification for the Championship round
7	Silkeborg	22	8	5	9	34	35	−1	29	Qualification for the Qualification round
8	Midtjylland	22	6	10	6	32	29	+3	28	Qualification for the Qualification round
9	OB	22	7	7	8	27	38	−11	28	Qualification for the Qualification round
10	Horsens	22	6	5	11	26	37	−11	23	Qualification for the Qualification round

Source: Danish Football Association (in Danish), Soccerway
Rules for classification: 1) Points; 2) Goal difference; 3) Goals scored; 4) Away goals scored; 5) Play-off (played on neutral ground if determining teams for different rounds); 6) Draw.

==== Results by round - Regular season ====
Matchday	1	2	3	4	5	6	7	8	9	10	11	12	13	14	15	16	17	18	19	20	21	22
Ground	H	H	A	A	A	H	A	H	A	H	A	H	H	A	H	A	H	A	H	A	H	A
Result	D	L	W	D	D	L	W	L	D	W	D	W	W	D	L	D	D	W	L	D	L	D
Position	8	10	5	8	7	8	7	8	8	7	7	5	5	5	8	8	7	4	6	7	9	8

Source: http://www.superliga.dk/
A = Away; H = Home; W = Win; D = Draw; L = Loss

==== Relegation round ====
Pos	Team	Pld	W	D	L	GF	GA	GD	Pts	Qualification or relegation	MID	ODE	SIL	LYN	ACH	AAB
1	Midtjylland (O)	32	13	12	7	55	39	+16	51	Qualification for the European play-off match	—	4–2	3–0	1–0	3–1	1–1
2	OB	32	12	10	10	47	53	−6	46		1–3	—	2–0	2–2	2–1	1–1
3	Silkeborg	32	11	8	13	44	49	−5	41		3–3	0–1	—	1–0	1–2	2–2
4	Lyngby	32	6	10	16	30	49	−19	28		2–1	0–4	1–1	—	2–1	2–1
5	Horsens (R)	32	7	7	18	33	58	−25	28	Relegation to Danish 1st Division	0–2	2–2	0–1	0–0	—	0–4

Source: Danish Football Association (in Danish), Soccerway
Rules for classification: 1) Points; 2) Goal difference; 3) Goals scored; 4) Away goals scored; 5) Play-off (played on neutral ground if determining teams for different rounds); 6) Draw.
(O) Play-off winners; (R) Relegated

==== Results by round – Relegation round ====
Matchday	1	2	3	4	5	6	7	8	9	10
Ground	A	H	H	A	H	A	H	A	A	H
Result	W	W	D	W	W	L	W	W	D	W
Position	7	7	7	7	7	7	7	7	7	7

Source: http://www.superliga.dk/
A = Away; H = Home; W = Win; D = Draw; L = Loss

==== Regular season ====
15 July 2022 1	Midtjylland	1–1	Randers FC	Herning
19:00 CEST	Isaksen 54'; Sviatchenko (yellow card) 59'; Thychosen (yellow card) 61'; Dalsgaard (yellow card) 87'; Kaba (yellow card) 90+4'	FCM Report	Brock-Madsen (yellow card) 48'; A. Andersson 60'; Kehinde (yellow card) 72'	Stadium: MCH Arena; Attendance: 7,359; Referee: Jonas Hansen

22 July 2022 2	Midtjylland	1–3	Silkeborg IF	Herning
19:00 CEST	Onyedika (yellow card) 45'; Dreyer 51' (Charles)	FCM Report	Vallys 31' (R. Carstensen); Klynge (yellow card) 37' (goal) 57' (Vallys); Salquist (yellow card) 60'; Helenius 61' (Sonne)	Stadium: MCH Arena; Attendance: 6,912; Referee: Jakob A. Sundberg

30 July 2022 3	OB	1–5	Midtjylland	Odense
19:00 CEST	Frøkjær-Jensen 32' (Kadrii); Tverskov (yellow card) 41'	FCM Report	Dreyer 24' 58' (Andersson); Andersson (yellow card) 42'; Isaksen 52' (Kaba); Dyhr (yellow card) 54'; Kaba 61' (Dreyer); Sisto 73' (Charles)	Stadium: Nature Energy Park; Attendance: 6,164; Referee: Jorgen Daugbjerg Burchardt

5 August 2022 4	Lyngby	3–3	Midtjylland	Kongens Lyngby
20:00 CEST	Bjelland (yellow card) 40'; Nielsen 44' (Rømer); Kristensen 61' (pen) (yellow card) 78'; Magnússon 87' (Kristensen)	FCM Report	Kaba 4' (Andersson); Dyhr 15' (Dalsgaard); Dreyer 32' (Dyhr); Onyedika (yellow card) 69'	Stadium: Lyngby Stadion; Attendance: 5,148; Referee: Aydin Uslu

12 August 2022 5	Horsens	3–3	Midtjylland	Horsens
19:00 CEST	Musonda 57'; Sigurðarson 89' (pen); Jensen 90+2' (Musonda)	FCM Report	Isaksen 8' (Sviatchenko) 41' (Kaba); Sisto 23'; Dalsgaard (red card) 67'; Juninho (yellow card) 80' (yellow-red card) 87'	Stadium: CASA Arena Horsens; Attendance: 4,300; Referee: Jakob Kehlet

20 August 2022 6	Midtjylland	0–2	AGF	Herning
16:00 CEST	Thychosen (yellow card) 76'	FCM Report	Kahl (yellow card) 22'; Bisseck 61' (Madsen); Anderson 86' (Poulsen)	Stadium: MCH Arena; Attendance: 8,950; Referee: Jens Maae

29 August 2022 7	Brøndby IF	0–2	Midtjylland	Brøndbyvester
19:00 CEST	Cappis (yellow card) 10'; Maxsø (yellow card) 13'; Kvistgaarden (yellow card) 43'; Slimane (yellow card) 80'; Wass (yellow card) 90'	FCM Report	Evander 14' (pen) (yellow card) 89'; Paulinho (yellow card) 18'; Sisto 26' (Isaksen); Sviatchenko (yellow card) 62'; Isaksen (yellow card) 90+4'	Stadium: Brøndby Stadium; Attendance: 16,622; Referee: Mikkel Redder

4 September 2022 8	Midtjylland	0–2	Aab	Herning
18:00 CEST	Evander (yellow card) 90+1'	FCM Report	Ferreira 30' (yellow card) 66'; Sousa 58' (Andersen)	Stadium: MCH Arena; Attendance: 8,953; Referee: Morten Krogh

11 September 2022 9	FC Nordsjælland	1–1	Midtjylland	Farum
14:00 CEST	Nuamah 15' (Villadsen); Christensen (yellow card) 66'; Dorgeles (yellow card) 90+2'	FCM Report	Charles (yellow card) 60'; Kaba (yellow card) 90'; Paulinho (yellow card) 90+1'; Evander 90+11' (pen)	Stadium: Right to Dream Park; Attendance: 4,616; Referee: Sandi Putros

18 September 2022 10	Midtjylland	2–1	Copenhagen	Herning
18:00 CEST	Evander 36' (pen); Dreyer 36' (Kaba) (yellow card) 65'; Andersson (yellow card) 52'; Sviatchenko (yellow card) 72'	FCM Summary	Daramy 25' (Jóhannesson); Khocholava (yellow card) 59'; Claesson (yellow card) 88'; Kristiansen (yellow card) 90+2'	Stadium: MCH Arena; Attendance: 10,911; Referee: Mads-Kristoffer Kristoffersen

2 October 2022 11	Midtjylland	1–1	Viborg FF	Herning
14:00 CEST	Olsson 44' (yellow card) 45'; Evander (yellow card) 90+4'	FCM Report	Bonde (yellow card) 31'; Grot 43' (Said); Zalatel (yellow card) 90+4'	Stadium: MCH Arena; Attendance: 10,284; Referee: Jonas Hansen

9 October 2022 12	AGF	0–1	Midtjylland	Aarhus
14:00 CEST	Tingager (red card) 28'; Links (yellow card) 85'; Poulsen (yellow card) 89'; Emil Madsen (yellow card) 90+2'	FCM Report	Olsson (yellow card) 44'; Evander (yellow card) 46'; Dreyer 87' (Kaba)	Stadium: Ceres Park; Attendance: 18,356; Referee: Morten Krogh

16 October 2022 13	Midtjylland	2–1	AC Horsens	Herning
18:00 CEST	Dreyer 22' (Sisto); Olsson 86' (Sviatchenko); Sviatchenko (yellow card) 90+1'	FCM Report	Musonda 20' (Kruse); Ludwig (red card) 81'; Iyede (yellow card) 85'; Delač (yellow card) 90'	Stadium: MCH Arena; Attendance: 8,649; Referee: Jakob A. Sundberg

22 October 2022 14	Copenhagen	1–1	Midtjylland	Copenhagen
16:00 CEST	Stamenic (yellow card) 25'; Claesson 31' (Jelert); Daramy (yellow card) 52'; Lerager (yellow card) 57'; Khocholava (yellow card) 71'; Jóhannesson (yellow card) 90+1'	FCM Summary	Olsson (yellow card) 59'; Evander 72'; Kaba (yellow card) 64'; Thychosen (yellow card) 78'; Sviatchenko (yellow card) 84'; Paulinho (yellow card) 90+1'	Stadium: Parken; Attendance: 29,664; Referee: Mads-Kristoffer Kristoffersen

31 October 2022 15	Midtjylland	1–2	OB	Herning
19:00 CEST	Dreyer 53' (pen)	FCM Summary	Tverskov (yellow card) 14'; Jebali 45+3' (pen); Hansen (yellow card) 60'; Þrándarson 90+4' (Horneman)	Stadium: MCH Arena; Attendance: 7,776; Referee: Aydin Uslu

7 November 2022 16	Midtjylland	0–0	Nordsjælland	Herning
19:00 CEST	Sviatchenko (yellow card) 54'; Gartenmann (yellow card) 90+3'	FCM Summary	Frese (yellow card) 7'; Ascone (yellow card) 51'	Stadium: MCH Arena; Attendance: 7,935; Referee: Peter Kjærsgaard-Andersen

13 November 2022 17	Randers	0–0	Midtjylland	Randers
20:00 CEST		FCM Summary		Stadium: Cepheus Park; Attendance: 3,631; Referee: Jakob Kehlet

20 February 2023 18	Viborg	0–4	Midtjylland	Viborg
19:00 CEST	Zaletel (yellow card) 74'; Mortimer (yellow card) 90+2'	FCM Summary	Ashour 5'; Gartenmann (yellow card) 45+1'; Isaksen 48' (Paulinho) 67' (Olsson) 69'; Thychosen (yellow card) 85'	Stadium: Energi Viborg Stadium; Attendance: 7,218; Referee: Jacob Karlsen

27 February 2023 19	Midtjylland	0–1	Brøndby	Herning
19:00 CEST	Selmani (yellow card) 2'; Heiselberg (yellow card) 90+5'	FCM Summary	Hedlund (yellow card) 12'; Omoijuanfo 57' (Hedlund); Vallys (yellow card) 82'; Tshiembe (yellow card) 83'	Stadium: MCH Arena; Attendance: 9,865; Referee: Mikkel Redder

6 March 2023 20	AaB	0–0	Midtjylland	Aalborg
19:00 CEST	Granli (yellow card) 24'	FCM Summary	Isaksen (yellow card) 41'; Dalsgaard (yellow card) 87'	Stadium: Aalborg Portland Park; Attendance: 6,396; Referee: Peter Kjærsgaard-Andersen

12 March 2023 21	Midtjylland	1–3	Lyngby	Herning
14:00 CEST	Şimşir 57' (Olsson); Brumado (yellow card) 78' (yellow-red card) 82'; Lössl (yellow card) 81'; Sørensen (yellow card) 89'	FCM Summary	Magnússon 16' 79' (Finnsson); Hey (yellow card) 51'; Winther (yellow card) 69'; Gytkjær 86' (Finnbogason) (yellow card) 89'	Stadium: MCH Arena; Attendance: 8,178; Referee: Mikkel Redder

19 March 2023 22	Silkeborg	3–3	Midtjylland	Silkeborg
15:00 CEST	Adamsen 30' (Tengstedt); Sonne 60' (Engel) (yellow card) 74'; Lind 86' (Salquist); Engel (yellow card) 88'	Report	Gartenmann 14'; Isaksen (yellow card) 40' (goal) 45+3' (76); Bak (yellow card) 85'; Thychosen (yellow card) 88'	Stadium: JYSK Park; Attendance: 7,978; Referee: Sandi Putros

==== Relegation season ====
31 March 2023 23	OB	1–3	Midtjylland	Odense
19:00 CEST	Tongya (yellow card) 7'; Sabbi 31' (Tongya) (yellow card) 36'; Paulsen (yellow card) 82'; Minteh (yellow card) 90+6'	FCM Summary	Heiselberg 9'; Juninho 14' (Isaksen); Gartenmann (yellow card) 84'; Chilufya 90+1' (Şimşir)	Stadium: Nature Energy Park; Attendance: 7,864; Referee: Jakob Kehlet

10 April 2023 24	Midtjylland	1–0	Lyngby	Herning
14:00 CEST	Gigović (yellow card) 23'; Olsson 72' (Şimşir)	FCM Summary	Bjelland (yellow card) 60'; Mortensen (yellow card) 80'; Chukwuani (yellow card) 88'	Stadium: MCH Arena; Attendance: 7,351; Referee: Jonas Hansen

14 April 2023 25	Midtjylland	1–1	AaB	Herning
19:00 CEST	Thychosen (yellow card) 33'; Juninho (yellow card) 59'; Isaksen 82' (Şimşir)	FCM Summary	Sousa 42' (Granli); Thelander (yellow card) 78'; Ferreira (yellow card) 87'; Fossum (yellow card) 90+3'	Stadium: MCH Arena; Attendance: 7,334; Referee: Jacob Karlsen

23 April 2023 26	Horsens	0–2	Midtjylland	Horsens
14:00 CEST	Kruse (yellow card) 27'; Jensen (yellow card) 36'	FCM Summary	Gomes 9' (o.g.); Isaksen 69' (Olsson)	Stadium: Nordstern Arena Horsens; Attendance: 5,966; Referee: Lasse Graagaard

1 May 2023 27	Midtjylland	3–0	Silkeborg	Herning
19:00 CEST	Isaksen 5' 10' (Gartenmann); Dalsgaard 20' (Juninho)	FCM Summary		Stadium: MCH Arena; Attendance: 8,582; Referee: Jorgen Daugberg Burchardt

7 May 2023 28	Lyngby BK	2–1	Midtjylland	Lyngby
14:00 CEST	Chukwuani 2' (Finnsson); Magnússon 32' (Hey); Knudsen (yellow card) 40'; Gytkjær (yellow card) 84'; Finnsson (yellow card) 87'	FCM Summary	Gartenmann 13' (Isaksen); Juninho (yellow card) 52'; Heiselberg (yellow card) 78'	Stadium: Lyngby Stadion; Attendance: 7,438; Referee: Mikkel Redder

14 May 2023 29	Midtjylland	3–1	Horsens	Herning
14:00 CEST	Gartenmann 20' (Olsson); Olsson (yellow card) 44'; Kiilerich 50' (o.g.); Dalsgaard (yellow card) 53'; Isaksen 72' (Olsson)	FCM Summary	Santos 24' (Jacobsen); Jacobsen (yellow card) 53'	Stadium: MCH Arena; Attendance: 8,383; Referee: Jacob Karlsen

19 May 2023 30	AaB	0–2	Midtjylland	Aalborg
14:00 CEST	Ahlmann (yellow card) 38'; Jørgensen (yellow card) 37'; Bakiz (yellow card) 45'	FCM Summary	Isaksen 5'; Dalsgaard (yellow card) 26'; Paulinho 50' (Isaksen)	Stadium: Aalborg Portland Park; Attendance: 10,185; Referee: Jørgen Daugbjerg Burchardt

29 May 2023 31	Silkeborg	3–3	Midtjylland	Silkeborg
14:00 CEST	Kusk 14'; Mattsson (yellow card) 68'; Tengstedt 75' 86' (pen)	FCM Summary	Isaksen 45+2' (Olsson) 79' (Şimşir); Martínez (yellow card) 52'; Olsson (yellow card) 67' (goal) 69' (Şimşir); Paulinho (yellow card) 86'	Stadium: JYSK Park; Attendance: 6,139; Referee: Jakob A. Sundberg

3 June 2023 32	Midtjylland	4–2	OB	Herning
14:00 CEST	Isaksen 28' (pen); Thychosen (yellow card) 35'; Olsson 38' (Juninho); Şimşir 57' (Olsson); Sørensen 82' (Isaksen)	FCM Summary	Tversekov (yellow card) 35'; Frøkjær-Jensen 36' (pen) 79' (pen)	Stadium: MCH Arena; Attendance: 8,977; Referee: Mads-Kristoffer Kristoffersen

== European play-offs ==
The 4th-placed team of the championship round advances to a play-off match against the winning team of the qualification round (no. 7) in a single-leg tie, with the team from the championship round as hosts. The winner earns a place in the Europa Conference League second qualifying round.

=== European play-off match ===
9 June 2023 Playoff	Viborg	0–1	Midtjylland	Viborg
19:00 CEST	Bundgaard (yellow card) 72'; Westergaard (yellow card) 88'; Achouri (yellow card) 90+14'	FCM Summary	Martínez (yellow card) 42'; Brumado (yellow card) 49'; Juninho (yellow card) 60'; Şimşir 66' (Sørensen)	Stadium: Energi Viborg Stadium; Attendance: 8,356; Referee: Peter Kjærsgaard

=== Danish Cup ===
19 October 2022 Third round	FA 2000	0–6	Midtjylland	Frederiksberg
18:00 CEST	Rimmen (yellow card) 70'	FCM Summary	Kaba 13' (Gartenmann); Evander 20' (pen) 30' (Sørensen); Gartenmann 44' (Juninho); Christensen 65' (yellow card) 77'; Texel (yellow card) 71'; Chilufya 82'	Stadium: Frederiksberg Idrætspark; Referee: Jakob Kehlet

10 November 2022 Fourth round	Viborg FF	3–1	Midtjylland	Viborg
TBD CEST	Søndergaard 14'; Bürgy 19'; Said 36' (Achouri); Jatta (yellow card) 90+2'	FCM Summary	Olsson (yellow card) 38'; Isaksen 53' (Dreyer); Sviatchenko (yellow card) 90'	Stadium: Energi Viborg Arena; Attendance: 7,117; Referee: Mikkel Redder

=== UEFA Champions League ===
19 July 2022 Second qualifying round first leg	Midtjylland (Denmark)	1–1	(Cyprus) AEK Larnaca FC	Herning
19:00 CEST	Onyedika (yellow card) 19'; Charles (yellow card) 57'; Sviatchenko 84' (Dreyer); Lind (yellow card) 87'	Report	Miličević (yellow card) 47'; Gyurcsó 81' (Pirić); Pirić (yellow card) 90+4'	Stadium: MCH Arena; Attendance: 7,359; Referee: Novak Simović (Serbia)

26 July 2022 Second qualifying round second leg	AEK Larnaca FC (Cyprus)	1–1 (a.e.t.) (2–2 agg.) (3–4 p)	(Denmark) Midtjylland	Larnaca, Cyprus
17:30 CEST	Olatunji 9' (Faraj); Rosales (yellow card) 77'; Gama (yellow card) 100'	FCM Report	Dalsgaard 12' (Andersson); Onyedika (yellow card) 58'; Juninho (yellow card) 69'	Stadium: AEK Arena – Georgios Karapatakis; Attendance: 6,163; Referee: István Vad (Hungary)
	Penalties
	Altman (penalty missed); Miličević (penalty scored); Romo (penalty scored); Gama (penalty scored); Ledes (penalty missed)		(penalty scored) Dreyer; (penalty scored) Sisto; (penalty scored) Oliver Sørensen; (penalty scored) Dyhr; (penalty missed) Kaba

2 August 2022 Third qualifying round first leg	S.L. Benfica (Portugal)	4–1	(Denmark) Midtjylland	Lisbon, Portugal
21:00 CEST	Ramos 16' (Neres) 33' (Neres) 61' (Silva); Otamendi (yellow card) 22'; Fernández 40' (Mário); Morato (yellow card) 76'	FCM Report	Sisto 77' (pen)	Stadium: Estádio da Luz; Attendance: 53,346; Referee: Alejandro Hernández (Spain)

9 August 2022 Third qualifying round second leg	Midtjylland (Denmark)	1–3 (2–7 agg.)	(Portugal) S.L. Benfica	Randers
19:45 CEST	Sisto 63'; Onyedika (yellow card) 69'	FCM Report	Fernández 23' (Ramos); Ramos (yellow card) 28'; Silva (yellow card) 40'; Araújo 56' (Mário); Gonçalves 88' (Yaremchuk)	Stadium: Cepheus Park Randers; Attendance: 5,111; Referee: Srđan Jovanović (Serbia)

=== UEFA Europa League ===
Pos	Team	Pld	W	D	L	GF	GA	GD	Pts	Qualification
1	(Netherlands) Feyenoord	6	2	2	2	13	9	+4	8 (Note: Tied on head-to-head results. Overall goal difference is used as the tiebreaker. Between Feyenoord and Midtjylland, overall goals scored is used as the tiebreaker.)	Advance to round of 16
2	(Denmark) Midtjylland	6	2	2	2	12	8	+4	8	Advance to knockout round play-offs
3	(Italy) Lazio	6	2	2	2	9	11	−2	8	Transfer to Europa Conference League
4	(Austria) Sturm Graz	6	2	2	2	4	10	−6	8	

Source: UEFA
Rules for classification: Group stage tiebreakers

==== Group stage ====
8 September 2022 1	Sturm Graz (Austria)	1–0	(Denmark) Midtjylland	Graz, Austria
21:00 C.E.T	Emegha 8' (Dante) (yellow card) 40'; Hierländer (yellow card) 65' (yellow-red card) 73'; Ljubić (yellow card) 90'; Gazibegović (yellow card) 90+2'; Ajeti (yellow card) 90+6'	FCM Report	Isaksen (yellow card) 90+2'	Stadium: Liebenauer Stadium; Attendance: 10,521; Referee: Aliyar Aghayev (Azerbaijan)

15 September 2022 2	Midtjylland (Denmark)	5–1	(Italy) Lazio	Herning
18:45 C.E.T	Paulinho 26' (Evander) (yellow card) 55'; Kaba 30' (Dreyer); Evander 52' (pen); Lössl (yellow card) 61'; Isaksen 67'; Sviatchenko 72' (Evander)	FCM Report	Milinković-Savić 57' (Immobile); Romagnoli (yellow card) 70'	Stadium: MCH Arena; Attendance: 9,052; Referee: Nikola Dabanović (Montenegro)

6 October 2022 3	Midtjylland (Denmark)	2–2	(Netherlands) Feyenoord	Herning
21:00 C.E.T	Sviatchenko (yellow card) 29'; Dalsgaard (yellow card) 40'; Evander (yellow card) 44'; Juninho (footballer, born February 1995) (yellow card) 47' (goal) 85' (Evander); Isaksen 54'; Martinez (yellow card) 75'; Paulinho (yellow card) 77'	FCM Summary	Szymański 21'; Kökçü 45' (pen); López (yellow card) 45+2'; Hancko (yellow card) 45+5'; Jahanbakhsh (yellow card) 68'	Stadium: MCH Arena; Attendance: 9,044; Referee: Mohammed Al-Hakim (Sweden)

13 October 2022 4	Feyenoord (Netherlands)	1–1	(Denmark) Midtjylland	Rotterdam, Netherlands
18:45 C.E.T	Timber 32' (Szymański); Hancko 48' (Geertruida); Geertruida (yellow card) 63'; Kökçü (yellow card) 71'; Wålemark (yellow card) 74'	FCM Summary	Martínez (yellow card) 12' (goal) 16' (Paulinho); Sviatchenko 58' (Evander); Olsson (yellow card) 63'; Lössl (yellow card) 89'	Stadium: De Kuip; Attendance: 43,086; Referee: (Slovenia) Rade Obrenović

27 October 2022 5	Lazio (Italy)	2–1	(Denmark) Midtjylland	Rome, Italy
18:45 C.E.T	Romagnoli (yellow card) 15'; Milinković-Savić 36' (Felipe Anderson); Pedro 58'; Mario Gila (yellow card) 69'; Vecino (yellow card) 89'	FCM Summary	Isaksen 8'; Andersson (yellow card) 42'; Juninho (yellow card) 90'; Sviatchenko (yellow card) 90+5'	Stadium: Stadio Olimpico; Attendance: 17,756; Referee: Daniel Stefański (Poland)

3 November 2022 6	Midtjylland (Denmark)	2–0	(Austria) Sturm Graz	Herning
18:45 C.E.T	Dreyer 15' (Isaksen) 72' (Isaksen); Evander (yellow card) 28'; Sviatchenko (yellow card) 88'; Olsson (yellow card) 90+4'	FCM Summary	Kiteishvili (yellow card) 30'; Dante (yellow card) 33'; Schnegg (yellow card) 55'; Emegha (yellow card) 88'	Stadium: MCH Arena; Attendance: 9,134; Referee: Matej Jug (Slovenia)

==== Knock-out round play-offs ====
16 February 2023 First leg	Sporting CP (Portugal)	1–1	(Denmark) Midtjylland	Lisbon, Portugal
21:00 CEST	Coates (yellow card) 88' (goal) 90+4'; Tanlongo (yellow card) 90+3'	FCM Report	Emiliano Martínez (yellow card) 63'; Ashour 77'; Isaksen (yellow card) 83'; Gigović (yellow card) 86'	Stadium: Estádio José Alvalade; Attendance: 23,279; Referee: François Letexier (France)

23 February 2023 Second leg	Midtjylland (Denmark)	0–4 (1–5 agg.)	(Portugal) Sporting CP	Herning, Denmark
TBD CEST	Paulinho (yellow card) 36' (yellow-red card) 38'; Ashour (yellow card) 74'; Gigović (yellow card) 90'	FCM Summary	Coates 21'; Esgaio (yellow card) 33'; Pote 50' 77' (Nuno Santos); Gartenmann 85' (o.g.)	Stadium: MCH Arena; Attendance: 9,576; Referee: Ivan Kružliak (Slovakia)

== Statistics ==
=== Appearances ===
Includes all competitive matches.

Rnk	Pos	No.	Player	Superliga	Danish Cup	UEFA Champions League	UEFA Europa League	Total
1	FW	11	(Denmark) Gustav Isaksen	31	1	4	8	44
2	DF	29	(Brazil) Paulinho	29	0	4	8	41
3	MF	18	(Zambia) Edward Chilufya	26	2	4	8	40
4	DF	73	(Brazil) Juninho	26	2	4	5	37
4	MF	24	(Denmark) Oliver Sørensen	27	2	3	5	37
6	DF	17	(Denmark) Mads Døhr Thychosen	24	1	4	6	36
7	DF	14	(Denmark) Henrik Dalsgaard	24	0	4	7	35
8	GK	1	(Denmark) Jonas Lössl	25	1	0	8	34
9	MF	5	(Uruguay) Emiliano Martínez	25	1	0	7	33
10	MF	8	(Sweden) Kristoffer Olsson	24	1	0	7	32
11	DF	4	(Denmark) Stefan Gartenmann	26	2	0	3	31
12	MF	35	(Brazil) Charles	20	2	3	3	28
13	FW	9	(Guinea) Sory Kaba	16	2	4	5	27
14	MF	36	(Denmark) Anders Dreyer	15	1	4	6	26
14	DF	28	(Denmark) Erik Sviatchenko	16	1	3	6	26
16	DF	6	(Sweden) Joel Andersson	16	0	4	5	25
17	DF	44	(Denmark) Nikolas Dyhr	12	2	4	3	21
18	MF	7	(Denmark) Pione Sisto	12	0	3	5	20
19	MF	10	(Brazil) Evander	10	1	2	6	19
20	MF	37	(Sweden) Armin Gigović	16	0	0	2	18
21	FW	58	(Denmark) Aral Şimşir	16	0	0	1	17
22	DF	55	(Denmark) Victor Bak Jensen	12	0	0	2	14
23	GK	16	(Iceland) Elías Rafn Ólafsson	8	1	4	0	13
23	FW	74	(Brazil) Júnior Brumado	12	0	1	0	13
25	FW	47	(Denmark) Frederik Heiselberg	9	0	0	2	11
25	MF	20	(Denmark) Valdemar Byskov	5	2	0	4	11
27	MF	15	(Nigeria) Raphael Onyedika	6	0	3	0	9
28	MF	10	(Egypt) Emam Ashour	5	0	0	2	7
29	FW	53	(Denmark) Victor Lind	3	0	1	0	4
29	MF	19	(Ivory Coast) Chris Kouakou	1	1	2	0	4
29	FW	25	(Kosovo) (Sweden) Astrit Selmani	3	0	0	1	4
32	MF	15	(Denmark) Gustav Christensen	0	1	0	1	2
32	DF	22	(Denmark) Pontus Texel	1	1	0	0	2
34	MF	21	(Denmark) Andreas Nibe	0	1	0	0	1
34	DF	26	(Colombia) Pablo Ortíz	0	1	0	0	1
34	MF	33	(Nigeria) Jamiu Musbaudeen	1	0	0	0	1

=== Goalscorers ===
This includes all competitive matches.

Rnk	Pos	No.	Player	Superliga	Danish Cup	UEFA Champions League	UEFA Europa League	Total
1	FW	45	(Denmark) Gustav Isaksen	18	1	0	3	22
2	MF	36	(Denmark) Anders Dreyer	8	0	0	2	10
3	MF	10	(Brazil) Evander	4	2	0	1	7
4	MF	7	(Denmark) Pione Sisto	3	0	2	0	5
4	MF	8	(Sweden) Kristoffer Olsson	5	0	0	0	5
6	FW	8	(Guinea) Sory Kaba	2	1	0	1	4
6	DF	4	(Denmark) Stefan Gartenmann	3	1	0	0	4
8	DF	28	(Denmark) Erik Sviatchenko	0	0	2	1	3
8	FW	58	(Denmark) Aral Şimşir	3	0	0	0	3
10	MF	10	(Egypt) Emam Ashour	1	0	0	1	2
10	DF	73	(Brazil) Juninho	1	0	1	0	2
10	FW	18	(Zambia) Edward Chilufya	1	1	0	0	2
10	DF	14	(Denmark) Henrik Dalsgaard	1	0	1	0	2
10	DF	29	(Brazil) Paulinho	1	0	0	1	2
15	DF	44	(Denmark) Nikolas Dyhr	1	0	0	0	1
15	MF	5	(Uruguay) Emiliano Martínez	0	0	0	1	1
15	MF	15	(Denmark) Gustav Christensen	0	1	0	0	1
15	FW	47	(Denmark) Frederick Heiselberg	1	0	0	0	1
15	MF	24	(Denmark) Oliver Sørensen	1	0	0	0	1
	O.G.		Opponent Own goal	2	0	0	0	2
TOTALS				56	7	4	13	79

=== Assists ===
This includes all competitive matches.

Rnk	Pos	No.	Player	Superliga	Danish Cup	UEFA Champions League	UEFA Europa League	Total
1	FW	11	(Denmark) Gustav Isaksen	5	0	0	2	7
1	MF	8	(Sweden) Kristoffer Olsson	7	0	0	0	7
3	FW	58	(Denmark) Aral Şimşir	5	0	0	0	5
4	MF	10	(Brazil) Evander	0	0	0	4	4
4	MF	36	(Denmark) Anders Dreyer	1	1	1	1	4
6	DF	6	(Sweden) Joel Andersson	2	0	1	0	3
6	FW	9	(Guinea) Sory Kaba	3	0	0	0	3
6	DF	73	(Brazil) Juninho	2	0	0	1	3
9	MF	35	(Brazil) Charles	2	0	0	0	2
9	FW	7	(Denmark) Pione Sisto	2	0	0	0	2
9	DF	28	(Denmark) Erik Sviatchenko	2	0	0	0	2
9	DF	29	(Brazil) Paulinho	1	0	0	1	2
9	DF	4	(Denmark) Stefan Gartenmann	1	1	0	0	2
9	MF	24	(Denmark) Oliver Sørensen	1	1	0	0	2
15	DF	6	(Denmark) Henrik Dalsgaard	1	0	0	0	1
15	DF	44	(Denmark) Nikolas Dyhr	1	0	0	0	1
TOTALS				36	4	2	9	51

=== Clean sheets ===
This includes all competitive matches.

Rnk	Pos	No.	Player	Superliga	Danish Cup	UEFA Champions League	UEFA Europa League	Total
1	GK	1	(Denmark) Jonas Lössl	10	0	0	1	11
2	GK	16	(Iceland) Elías Rafn Ólafsson	1	1	0	0	2
TOTALS				11	1	0	1	13

=== Disciplinary record ===
This includes all competitive matches.

Rnk	Pos.	No.	Player	Superliga		Danish Cup		UEFA Champions League		UEFA Europa League		Total	
Rnk	Pos.	No.	Player	Booked	Sent off (straight red)	Booked	Sent off (straight red)	Booked	Sent off (straight red)	Booked	Sent off (straight red)	Booked	Sent off (straight red)
1	DF	29	(Brazil) Paulinho	4	0	0	0	0	0	4	1	8	1
1	DF	73	(Brazil) Juninho	5	1	0	0	1	0	2	0	8	1
3	DF	28	(Denmark) Erik Sviatchenko	5	0	0	0	0	0	3	0	8	0
4	MF	8	(Sweden) Kristoffer Olsson	5	0	0	0	0	0	2	0	7	0
4	DF	17	(Denmark) Mads Døhr Thychosen	7	0	0	0	0	0	0	0	7	0
6	MF	10	(Brazil) Evander	4	0	0	0	0	0	2	0	6	0
6	DF	14	(Denmark) Henrik Dalsgaard	4	1	0	0	0	0	1	0	5	1
7	MF	15	(Nigeria) Raphael Onyedika	2	0	0	0	3	0	0	0	5	0
7	FW	11	(Denmark) Gustav Isaksen	3	0	0	0	0	0	2	0	5	0
7	MF	5	(Uruguay) Emiliano Martínez	2	0	0	0	0	0	3	0	5	0
10	FW	9	(Guinea) Sory Kaba	3	0	0	0	0	0	0	0	3	0
10	DF	6	(Sweden) Joel Andersson	2	0	0	0	0	0	1	0	3	0
10	GK	1	(Denmark) Jonas Lössl	1	0	0	0	0	0	2	0	3	0
10	FW	74	(Brazil) Júnior Brumado	2	1	0	0	0	0	0	0	2	1
10	DF	4	(Denmark) Stefan Gartenmann	3	0	0	0	0	0	0	0	3	0
10	MF	37	(Sweden) Armin Gigović	1	0	0	0	0	0	2	0	3	0
16	MF	35	(Brazil) Charles	1	0	0	0	1	0	0	0	2	0
16	FW	47	(Denmark) Frederick Heiselberg	2	0	0	0	0	0	0	0	3	0
18	FW	9	(Denmark) Victor Lind	0	0	0	0	1	0	0	0	1	0
18	DF	44	(Denmark) Nikolas Dyhr	1	0	0	0	0	0	0	0	1	0
18	MF	36	(Denmark) Anders Dreyer	1	0	0	0	0	0	0	0	1	0
18	MF	15	(Denmark) Gustav Christensen	0	0	1	0	0	0	0	0	1	0
18	MF	10	(Egypt) Emam Ashour	0	0	0	0	0	0	1	0	1	0
18	FW	25	(Kosovo) Astrit Selmani	1	0	0	0	0	0	0	0	1	0
18	MF	24	(Denmark) Oliver Sørensen	1	0	0	0	0	0	0	0	1	0
18	DF	55	(Denmark) Victor Bak Jensen	1	0	0	0	0	0	0	0	1	0
18	FW	74	(Brazil) Júnior Brumado	1	0	0	0	0	0	0	0	1	0
TOTALS				62	3	1	0	6	0	25	1	94	4
