= Kasper Kiilerich =

Danish footballer (born 2005)

Personal information
- Full name: Kasper Hartly Kiilerich
- Date of birth: 22 November 2005 (age 20)
- Place of birth: Viborg, Denmark
- Height: 2.02 m (6 ft 8 in)
- Position: Goalkeeper

Team information
- Current team: Viborg
- Number: 20

Youth career
- Viborg Nørremarken
- FK Viborg

Senior career*
Years	Team	Apps	(Gls)
2022–	Viborg FF	13	(0)
2025–2026	→ Aarhus Fremad (loan)	44	(0)

International career^{‡}
2024–	Denmark U19	1	(0)
- * Club domestic league appearances and goals as of 21:48, 25 October 2026 (UTC) ‡ National team caps and goals as of 21:16, 13 July 2024 (UTC)

Kasper Hartly Kiilerich (born 22 November 2005) is a Danish professional footballer who plays as a goalkeeper for Danish Superliga club Viborg.

== Career ==
Kiilerich started playing football in Viborg Nørremarken, and later moved to FK Viborg as a U13 player. At the age of 15, Kiilerich was already a regular on the U19 team and trained regularly with the senior squad. On his 16th birthday, Kiilerich was permanently promoted to the first team squad. On 31 August 2022, 16-year-old Kiilerich made his official debut for Viborg in a Danish Cup match against Viby IF.

In March 2023, Killerich was given a new contract in Viborg until the end of 2025.

On 4 December 2023, Killerich finally made his Danish Superliga debut when first goalkeeper Lucas Lund was injured in the match against FC Midtjylland after a collision at the end of the first half. Viborg would lose the match 5–1.

On 6 January 2025, in search of more playing time, it was confirmed that Kiilerich joined Danish 2nd Division club Aarhus Fremad on a loan deal until the end of the season. On 12 June 2025, Viborg confirmed that Kiilerich's contract had been extended until the end of 2028, and that he would also be loaned out for the upcoming season to Aarhus Fremad, where he had helped secure promotion to the 2025–26 Danish 1st Division. During the club's 2025–26, Kiilerich played in 30 matches for Fremad with 8 clean sheets. The club announced on 22 May that he would return to Viborg after the end of the season, ending his two years spent with the club on loan.

Following his return to Viborg, Kiilerich became the starting goalkeeper for the club ahead their opening match of the 2026–27 season. He kept a clean sheet during the match, helping Viborg secure a 1–0 win over OB.

== Personal life ==
Kasper Kiilerich is the son of former Danish professional goalkeeper Roald Kiilerich, who played for AGF and Viborg FF in the 1990s.
