= Christian Keller (footballer) =

Danish footballer (born 1980)

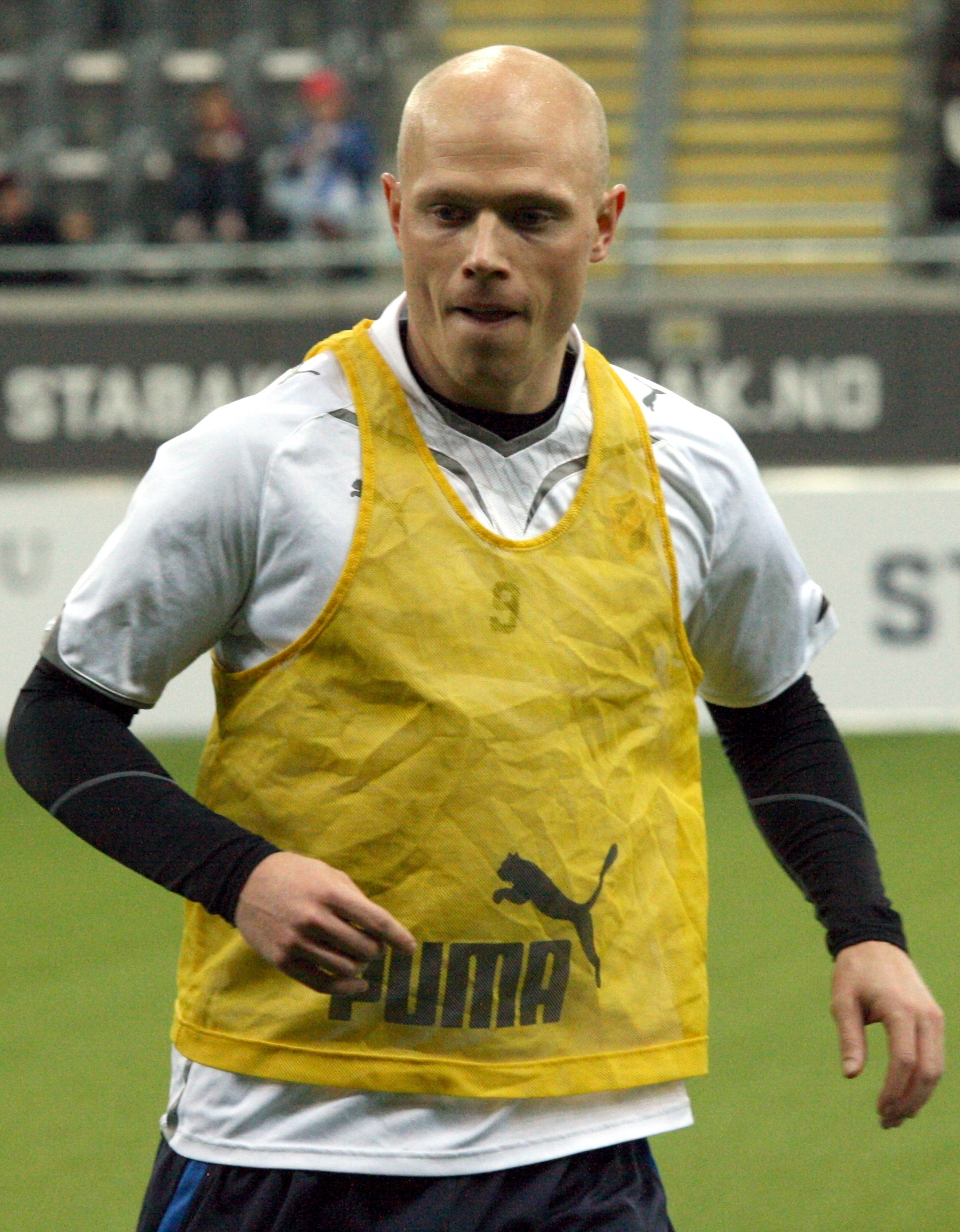

Personal information
- Full name: Christian Thielsen Keller
- Date of birth: 17 August 1980 (age 46)
- Place of birth: Brørup, Denmark
- Height: 1.82 m (6 ft 0 in)
- Position: Defensive midfielder

Senior career*
Years	Team	Apps	(Gls)
1999–2002	Vejle BK	85	(11)
2002–2005	Viborg FF	92	(11)
2005	Torino		
2005–2006	Lazio	7	(0)
2006–2009	Stabæk	56	(8)
2009–2011	Kasımpaşa	57	(0)
2011–2016	Randers FC	104	(2)
2016–2017	Viborg FF	22	(1)

International career
1996	Denmark U-16	4	(0)
1996–1997	Denmark U-17	16	(2)
1997–1998	Denmark U-19	5	(0)
2000	Denmark U-21	2	(0)
2007	Danish League XI	3	(0)
- * Club domestic league appearances and goals

Christian Thielsen Keller (born 17 August 1980) is a Danish former professional footballer who played as a defensive midfielder. He represented Denmark at various youth levels, making a combined total of 27 appearances.

== Career ==
Born in Brørup, Keller started playing football in nearby Vejen, before moving to top-flight club Vejle BK. He was called up for the Danish under-17 national team in January 1996, at age 15, before making his under-16 national debut in March 1996. He made his senior debut for Vejle in April 1999. A regular in the Vejle starting line-up, he moved to Viborg FF when Vejle were relegated to the secondary Danish 1st Division at the end of the 2001–02 season. He spent three years at Viborg, playing 92 league games and scoring 11 goals, until his contract ran out in June 2005.

He moved abroad on a free transfer, to play for Italian club Torino F.C., who looked to win promotion for the top-flight Serie A championship. Because of financial irregularities, Torino were not allowed to compete in the Serie A, and were relegated to the secondary Serie B division. After a few games for Torino, Keller was brought to Serie A club S.S. Lazio in August 2005. He played seven Serie A games for the club before moving to Stabæk Fotball in August 2006.

While at Stabæk, Keller was called up for the league national team by national team manager Morten Olsen in January 2007, to play a number of unofficial national team games in the United States, El Salvador and Honduras. He played in all three games of the tour. Keller was also voted 'Player of the Year' by the Stabæk supporters in 2008, after the club took home the Norwegian Championship.

In June 2009, Keller signed a contract with Turkish club Kasımpaşa S.K. On 23 June 2011, he returned to Denmark after signing a four-year deal with Randers.

After signing a one-year contract with Viborg FF in the summer of 2016, the club announced in January 2017, that Keller would retire when his contract expired in the summer of 2017.

== Personal life ==
In March 2016, it emerged that Keller had been together with Jonas Borring's now ex-wife. This episode escalated quickly, and Keller's teammates in Randers FC would not play with him, though he was the captain of the team. Keller was out of the squad after this episode. Borring left the club in March shortly after the incident, and on 20 June 2016 it was announced that Randers FC had released Keller.

Christian is the father of Viborg midfielder Philip Keller.

== Honours ==
Stabæk

- Tippeliga: 2008

Individual

- Stabæk player of the year: 2008 (selected by the fans)
