= Asker Beck =

Danish footballer (born 2003)

- Beck in 2026

Personal information
- Full name: Asker Beck Jensen
- Date of birth: 7 July 2003 (age 23)
- Place of birth: Skanderborg, Denmark
- Height: 1.84 m (6 ft 0 in)
- Position: Midfielder

Team information
- Current team: Viborg
- Number: 8

Youth career
- Skanderborg
- AGF

Senior career*
Years	Team	Apps	(Gls)
2021–2023	AGF	1	(0)
2023–2025	Kolding	45	(6)
2025–	Viborg	54	(5)
- * Club domestic league appearances and goals as of 21:29, 25 October 2026 (UTC)

Asker Beck Jensen (born 7 July 2003) is a Danish footballer who plays as a midfielder for Danish Superliga club Viborg.

== Career ==
=== AGF ===
Born and raised in Skanderborg, Beck started his football career as a youngster in FC Skanderborg, before later switching to AGF.

In the summer of 2022, Beck began training regularly with the first team squad. From there, it wasn't long before he made his official debut: on 3 April 2021, he got his first minutes when he was substituted in the Danish Cup victory over BK Frem. In April 2022, he also made his debut in the Danish Superliga against Vejle Boldklub.

=== Kolding IF ===
On 31 January 2023, Beck was sold to Danish 2nd Division side Kolding IF. During his first six months at the club, he made 16 appearances, which helped Kolding secure promotion to the 2023-24 Danish 1st Division.

=== Viborg FF ===
On 31 January 2025, Beck was sold to Danish Superliga club Viborg, signing a deal until June 2029. His debut for the club came on 24 February, in a 4–1 loss to Silkeborg. After initially being assigned number 15 upon his transfer, the club announced on 16 July that he would play the 2025–26 season wearing the number eight.

Beck became a regular in the Viborg first-team, usually appearing in games as a substitute. He scored his first Superliga goals for the club in a 3–3 draw against rivals FC Midtjylland, scoring twice.

== Career statistics ==
As of match played 25 October 2026

Appearances and goals by club, season and competition
Club	Season	League			Cup (Note: Includes Danish Cup)		Other		Total	
Club	Season	Division	Apps	Goals	Apps	Goals	Apps	Goals	Apps	Goals
AGF	2021–22	Danish Superliga	1	0	0	0	—		1	0
Kolding	2023–24	Danish 1st Division	29	5	3	1	—		32	6
Kolding	2024–25	Danish 1st Division	16	1	6	2	—		22	3
Kolding	Total		45	6	9	3	0	0	54	9
Viborg	2024–25	Danish Superliga	12	0	2	0	—		14	0
Viborg	2025–26	Danish Superliga	30	2	6	3	—		36	5
Viborg	2026–27	Danish Superliga	9	3	1	0	—		10	3
Viborg	Total		54	5	9	3	0	0	63	8
Career total			99	11	18	6	0	0	118	17

== Honours ==
Kolding IF

- Danish 2nd Division: 2022–23
