= Adam Kleis-Kristoffersen =

Danish footballer (born 2008)

Personal information
- Date of birth: 14 July 2008 (age 18)
- Position: Forward

Team information
- Current team: Viborg
- Number: 36

Youth career
- Viborg Søndermarken IK
- Viborg

Senior career*
Years	Team	Apps	(Gls)
2025–	Viborg	11	(1)

International career^{‡}
2026–	Denmark U19	2	(1)
- * Club domestic league appearances and goals as of 22:12, 25 October 2026 (UTC) ‡ National team caps and goals as of 01:37, 4 October 2026 (UTC)

Adam Kleis-Kristoffersen (born 14 July 2008) is a Danish footballer forward who plays for Danish Superliga club Viborg and the Danish national under-19 team.

== Career ==
Kleis-Kristoffersen began his youth career at Viborg Søndermarken IK, before moving to Viborg FF as an under-13 player. In July 2023, it was announced that he had won the Viborg's player of the year as part of their under-15 squad, before signing a new three-year contract with the club in September. 11 months later in August 2024, he was awarded a new contract with the club following a season in which he scored 34 goals in 30 games as part of Viborg's under-17 youth team. The new contract extended his deal with the club until August 2027. In May 2025, he scored both goals for Viborg's under-19 team in a 3–2 loss to Silkeborg's under-19 team, losing the Jutland Cup final.

Kleis-Kristoffersen began making sporadic appearances with Viborg's first team in 2025 during friendlies. On 24 September, he made his professional debut for Viborg in a Danish Cup third round match against BV Oksbøl. He played 29 minutes in Viborg's 6–0 win. He again made an appearance in Viborg's next cup match against fellow Danish Superliga club FC Fredericia, replacing captain Jeppe Grønning in the 84th minute and receiving a yellow card in the closing minutes of the second half.

On 22 April 2026, Kleis-Kristoffersen made his Danish Superliga debut in a 0–1 loss against Brøndby. In a rivalry match versus FC Midtjylland on 3 May, he assisted in the game's decisive 89th minute goal for a 3–3 draw.

Klein-Kristoffersen signed a new contract with Viborg ahead of the 2026–27 season until the summer of 2030. He was promoted to the first-team squad permanently with the contract. He scored his first goal in a 4–1 victory versus FC Nordsjælland on 20 September 2026.

== Career statistics ==
As of match played 25 October 2026

Appearances and goals by club, season and competition
Club	Season	League			Cup (Note: Includes appearances in the Danish Cup)		Other		Total	
Club	Season	Division	Apps	Goals	Apps	Goals	Apps	Goals	Apps	Goals
Viborg	2025–26	Danish Superliga	3	0	3	0	—		6	0
Viborg	2026–27	Danish Superliga	11	1	1	0	—		12	1
Career total			14	1	4	0	0	0	18	1
