= Bruunshaab Gamle Papfabrik =

Former factory in Bruunshåb, Denmark

Coordinates: 56°25′21.7″N 9°26′44.71″E

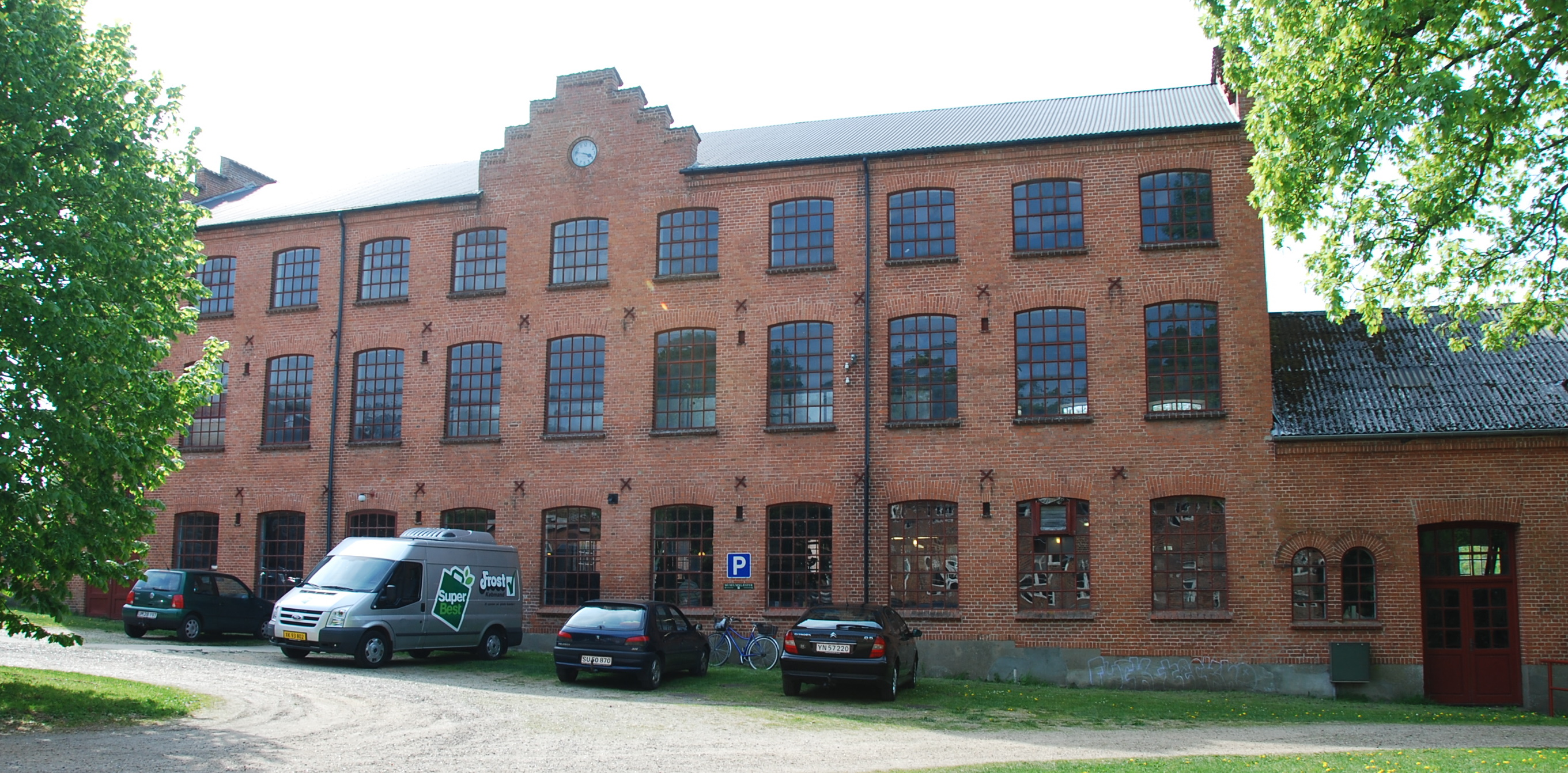
- Industry: Former pulp and paper
- Founded: 1821
- Headquarters: Bruunshåb, Viborg, Denmark
- Key people: Peter Daniel Bruun, Mads Pagh Bruun
- Website: www.papfabrik.dk

Bruunshaab Gamle Papfabrik (Bruunshaab Old Cardboard Factory) is a former textile and cardboard factory located in the town Bruunshåb, a few kilometers south of Viborg, Denmark. It was built as a textile factory by manufacturer Bertel Bruun in 1821. His sons Peter Daniel Bruun and Mads Pagh Bruun later took over the factory. The latter established the cloth mill Ny Bruunshaab at Aarhus.

After a large fire in the early 1900s, a new main building was built in 1909, designed by architect Søren Vig-Nielsen. In 1919, the factory was adapted for cardboard production. All production ended in the late 1960s.

The buildings have been protected since 1999. The factory has been a working museum since 1986.
