= Osman Addo =

Danish-born Somali footballer (born 2004)

Personal information
- Full name: Osman Abdulkadir Addo
- Date of birth: 31 March 2004 (age 22)
- Place of birth: Denmark
- Height: 1.83 m (6 ft 0 in)
- Position: Winger

Team information
- Current team: Viborg
- Number: 17

Youth career
- Vanløse IF
- KB
- B.93

Senior career*
Years	Team	Apps	(Gls)
2024–2026	B.93	56	(11)
2026–	Viborg	8	(2)
2026	→ Helsingborgs (loan)	8	(0)

International career
2026–	Somalia	1	(0)
- * Club domestic league appearances and goals as of 13:05, 10 November 2026 (UTC)

Osman Abdulkadir Addo (born 31 March 2004) is a professional footballer who plays as a winger for Danish Superliga club Viborg. He also plays for the Somalia national team.

== Club career ==
Addo played in the youth teams for Vanløse IF, KB, and B.93. He initially joined the B.93 under-13 team.

Addo made his competitive senior debut for B.93 in the spring of 2024, appearing in a 3–2 win over AC Horsens in the Danish 1st Division. He made a total of 10 appearances for the club during the remainder of the 2023–24 season, scoring three goals over the final eight games. Of B.93's 35 matches during the 2024–25 Danish 1st Division, Addo appeared in 32 games where he scored six goals. During B.93's 2025–26 Danish Cup campaign, he made one appearance for the club in a 10–0 win against Ålholm IF, where he scored four goals in eight minutes—a club record for B.93.

=== Viborg ===
On 21 January 2026, Addo was announced as Viborg's newest signing for a rumoured DKK 750,000. He signed a contract with Viborg until the summer of 2030, receiving the squad number 17. He traveled to Spain to continue training with the club during the Danish Superliga's winter break. He made his debut for the club in a Danish Cup semi-final match against Copenhagen on 11 February, coming on as a substitute in the closing minutes of a 2–1 defeat. He later scored his first goal for the club in a 5–2 defeat to AGF on 22 February. His first season for the club saw him finish with two goals across 10 appearances in all competitions.

Addo was loaned out to Swedish club Helsingborgs on 1 September 2026. The deal concluded at the end of the 2026 season. His time in Sweden finished with eight appearances, with no goals.

== International career ==
Addo made his debut for the Somalia national team on 29 September 2026, playing 21 minutes against Ivory Coast in the 2027 Africa Cup of Nations qualifying.

== Career statistics ==
=== Club ===
As of match played 7 November 2026

Appearances and goals by club, season and competition
Club	Season	League			Cup (Note: Includes appearances in the Danish Cup)		Other		Total	
Club	Season	Division	Apps	Goals	Apps	Goals	Apps	Goals	Apps	Goals
B.93	2023–24	Danish 1st Division	10	4	0	0	—		10	4
B.93	2024–25	Danish 1st Division	31	6	1	0	—		32	6
B.93	2025–26	Danish 1st Division	15	1	3	4	—		18	5
B.93	Total		56	11	4	4	0	0	60	15
Viborg	2025–26	Danish Superliga	8	2	2	0	—		10	2
Viborg	2026–27	Danish Superliga	0	0	0	0	—		0	0
Viborg	Total		8	2	2	0	0	0	10	2
Helsingborgs (loan)	2026	Superettan	8	0	—		—		8	0
Career total			72	13	6	4	0	0	78	17

=== International ===
As of match played 29 September 2026

Appearances and goals by national team and year
National team	Year	Apps	Goals
Somalia	2026	1	0
Total		1	0

== Honours ==
B.93

- B.93 Player of the Year: 2024–25
