= Lucas Lund =

Danish footballer (born 2000)

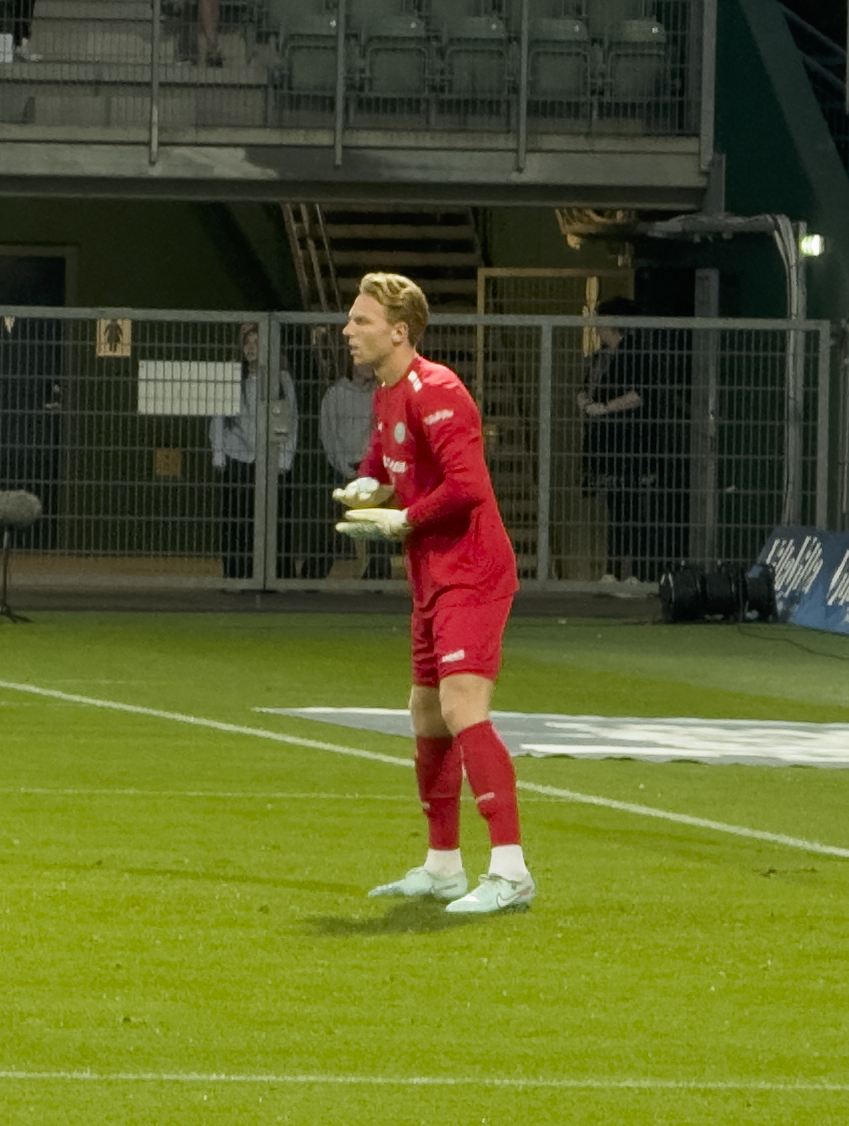
- Lund in 2025

Personal information
- Full name: Lucas Lund Pedersen
- Date of birth: 19 March 2000 (age 26)
- Place of birth: Bruunshåb, Denmark
- Height: 1.95 m (6 ft 5 in)
- Position: Goalkeeper

Team information
- Current team: Viborg
- Number: 1

Youth career
- 2011–2018: Viborg

Senior career*
Years	Team	Apps	(Gls)
2018–	Viborg	147	(0)

International career
2017	Denmark U17	1	(0)
2018	Denmark U18	1	(0)
2018–2019	Denmark U19	3	(0)
2021	Denmark U20	1	(0)
2021	Denmark U21	1	(0)
- * Club domestic league appearances and goals as of 16:12, 3 October 2026 (UTC)

Lucas Lund Pedersen (born 19 March 2000) is a Danish professional footballer who plays as a goalkeeper for Danish Superliga club Viborg.

== Career ==
Born in Bruunshåb, Viborg Municipality, Lund joined the youth academy of Viborg FF at U12 level.

On 8 August 2018, Lund made his senior debut in the first round of the Danish Cup in a 10–0 away win over Vildbjerg SF.

Ahead of the 2019–20 season, Lund became the new starting goalkeeper for the club. He made his league debut on 26 July 2019 in a 3–0 home win over Roskilde, where he delivered a Man of the Match performance.

Being part of the Viborg-team winning promotion to the Danish Superliga in the 2020–21 season, Lund made his debut at the highest level on 18 July 2021 in a 2–1 away win over Nordsjælland.

== Career statistics ==
As of match played 20 September 2026

Appearances and goals by club, season and competition
Club	Season	League			Danish Cup		Continental		Other		Total	
Club	Season	Division	Apps	Goals	Apps	Goals	Apps	Goals	Apps	Goals	Apps	Goals
Viborg	2018–19	Danish 1st Division	0	0	2	0	—		—		2	0
Viborg	2019–20	Danish 1st Division	4	0	0	0	—		—		4	0
Viborg	2020–21	Danish 1st Division	16	0	0	0	—		—		16	0
Viborg	2021–22	Danish Superliga	27	0	0	0	—		1 (Note: Appearance in the 2021–22 Superliga Conference League playoff)	0	28	0
Viborg	2022–23	Danish Superliga	33	0	1	0	6 (Note: Appearances in UEFA Conference League)	0	—		40	0
Viborg	2023–24	Danish Superliga	17	0	2	0	—		—		19	0
Viborg	2024–25	Danish Superliga	18	0	7	0	—		—		25	0
Viborg	2025–26	Danish Superliga	32	0	6	0	—		—		38	0
Viborg	2026–27	Danish Superliga	0	0	1	0	—		—		1	0
Career total			147	0	19	0	6	0	1	0	173	0

== Honours ==
Viborg

- Danish 1st Division: 2020–21
