= Dorian Jr. =

Equatoguinean footballer (born 2001)

Dorian Junior
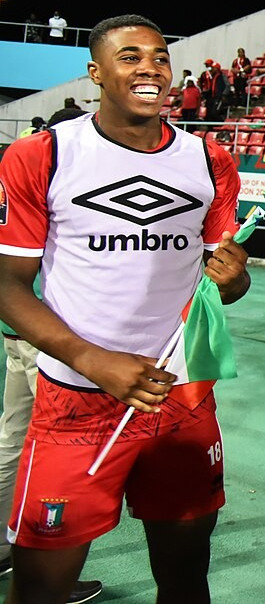
- Dorian with Equatorial Guinea in 2022

Personal information
- Full name: Dorian Junior Hanza Meha
- Date of birth: 12 May 2001 (age 25)
- Place of birth: Fuenlabrada, Spain
- Height: 1.87 m (6 ft 2 in)
- Position: Forward

Team information
- Current team: Viborg
- Number: 19

Youth career
- 2015–2018: Atlético Fuenlabreño
- 2018–2020: Alcobendas

Senior career*
Years	Team	Apps	(Gls)
2020–2021	San Martín	25	(9)
2021–2024	Cultural Leonesa	24	(1)
2021–2022	→ Langreo (loan)	28	(9)
2022–2023	→ Leganés B (loan)	32	(13)
2023	→ Leganés (loan)	1	(0)
2024–2025	Marbella	29	(8)
2025–	Viborg	42	(8)

International career^{‡}
2021–	Equatorial Guinea	22	(1)
- * Club domestic league appearances and goals as of 21:46, 25 October 2026 (UTC) ‡ National team caps and goals as of 18:09, 12 November 2026 (UTC)

Dorian Junior Hanza Meha (born 12 May 2001) is a professional footballer who plays as a forward for Danish Superliga club Viborg. Born in Spain, he represents Equatorial Guinea at international level.

== Early life ==
Dorian Jr. was born in Fuenlabrada, Spain to Equatoguinean Bubi parents.

== Club career ==
Dorian Jr. is a CD Atlético Fuenlabreño and Alcobendas CF product. He has played for EI San Martín and Langreo in Spain.

On 15 July 2025, Dorian Jr. signed for Danish club Viborg. Signing a four-year contract through the summer of 2029, he was assigned number 19. He made his debut three days later on 18 July in a 3–2 loss against Copenhagen.

== International career ==
Dorian Jr. made his senior debut for Equatorial Guinea on 16 November 2021.

== Career statistics ==
=== Club ===
As of match played 25 October 2026

Appearances and goals by club, season and competition
Club	Season	League			Cup		Other		Total	
Club	Season	Division	Apps	Goals	Apps	Goals	Apps	Goals	Apps	Goals
San Martín	2020–21	Tercera División	24	9	—		1 (Note: Appearance(s) in 2021 Tercera División play-offs)	0	25	9
Langreo (loan)	2021–22	Segunda Federación	28	9	—		—		28	9
Leganés B (loan)	2022–23	Segunda Federación	32	13	—		—		32	13
Leganés (loan)	2022–23	Segunda División	1	0	0	0	—		1	0
Cultural Leonesa	2023–24	Primera Federación	24	1	—		—		24	1
Marbella	2024–25	Primera Federación	29	8	3	2	—		32	10
Viborg	2025–26	Danish Superliga	30	3	6	3	—		36	6
Viborg	2026–27	Danish Superliga	12	5	1	1	—		13	6
Viborg	Total		42	8	6	4	0	0	49	12
Career total			179	48	10	6	1	0	190	54

=== International ===
As of match played 12 November 2026

Appearances and goals by national team and year
National team	Year	Apps	Goals
Equatorial Guinea	2021	1	0
Equatorial Guinea	2022	9	0
Equatorial Guinea	2023	3	0
Equatorial Guinea	2024	7	1
Equatorial Guinea	2025	1	0
Equatorial Guinea	2026	1	0
Total		22	1

Scores and results list Equatorial Guinea's goal tally first, score column indicates score after each Dorian Junior goal.

List of international goals scored by Dorian Junior
No.	Date	Venue	Opponent	Score	Result	Competition	Ref.
1	14 October 2024	Samuel Kanyon Doe Sports Complex, Paynesville, Liberia	Liberia	2–1	2–1	2025 Africa Cup of Nations qualification	
