= Philip Keller =

Danish footballer (born 2008)

Personal information
- Date of birth: 22 January 2008 (age 18)
- Position: Midfielder

Team information
- Current team: Viborg
- Number: 34

Youth career
- Viborg Søndermarken
- –2026: Viborg

Senior career*
Years	Team	Apps	(Gls)
2026–	Viborg	11	(0)

International career^{‡}
2025–	Denmark U18	6	(1)
2026–	Denmark U19	4	(0)
- * Club domestic league appearances and goals as of 22:09, 25 October 2026 (UTC) ‡ National team caps and goals as of 02:46, 17 November 2026 (UTC)

Philip Keller (born 22 January 2008) is a Danish professional footballer who plays as a midfielder for Danish Superliga club Viborg. He also plays for the Denmark national under-19 football team.

== Career ==
Keller began his youth career with Viborg Søndermarken before joining Viborg FF as an under-13 player. In January 2023, shortly after his 15th birthday, he signed a three-year youth contract with Viborg until 2026. He progressed through the youth ranks, later playing with Viborg's under-19 team.

In September 2025, Keller made his professional debut in the third round of the 2025–26 Danish Cup, replacing teammate Mees Hoedemakers in a 6–0 win over BV Oksbøl. He later joined the first-team in January 2026 during the Danish Superliga's winter break, accompanying the team to Spain where he took part in the team's friendly matches.

On his 18th birthday, Keller signed a professional contract with Viborg through the summer of 2031. The contract began in the following summer, when he was promoted to the first-team squad. In the opening fixture of Viborg's 2026–27 season, he made his Superliga debut in a 1–0 win over OB when he came on as a substitute in the 76th minute.

== International career ==
Keller made his debut for the Denmark under-18 football team in October 2025 against the Czech Republic, scoring in the 49th minute to give Denmark a 1–0 win. He was later called up to the under-18 team again in March 2026.

== Personal life ==
Philip is the son of former Viborg midfielder Christian Keller.

== Career statistics ==
As of match played 25 October 2026

Appearances and goals by club, season and competition
Club	Season	League			National cup (Note: Includes appearances in the Danish cup)		Other		Total	
Club	Season	Division	Apps	Goals	Apps	Goals	Apps	Goals	Apps	Goals
Viborg	2025–26	Danish Superliga	0	0	1	0	—		1	0
Viborg	2026–27	Danish Superliga	11	0	1	0	—		12	0
Career total			11	0	2	0	0	0	13	0
