= Mohamed Iyadh Riahi =

Tunisian footballer (born 2005)

Personal information
- Date of birth: 21 December 2005 (age 20)
- Height: 1.78 m (5 ft 10 in)
- Position: Right back

Team information
- Current team: Viborg
- Number: 2

Youth career
- Stade Tunisien

Senior career*
Years	Team	Apps	(Gls)
2023–2026	Stade Tunisien	23	(1)
2026–	Viborg	0	(0)

International career^{‡}
- Tunisia U20
2026–	Tunisia U23	5	(0)
- * Club domestic league appearances and goals as of 15:28, 11 July 2026 (UTC) ‡ National team caps and goals as of 15:28, 11 July 2026 (UTC)

Mohamed Iyadh Riahi (Arabic: محمد عياض الرياحي; born 21 December 2005) is a Tunisian professional footballer who plays as a right back for Danish Superliga club Viborg. He also plays for the Tunisia under-23 team.

== Career ==
Riahi made his debut for Stade Tunisien during the 2022–23 Tunisian Ligue Professionnelle 1 playout matches for the club, appearing in four games. During his time with the club, he made 31 appearances in all competitions, scoring one goal.

Riahi signed for Danish Superliga club Viborg on 6 July 2026, for a reported fee of DKK 880,000. He signed a four-year contract with the club until 2030, and was assigned to wear number two for the club. One week after joining the club, he injured his knee and missed the beginning of the club's 2026–27 season.

== International career ==
Riahi made four appearances for the Tunisia under-23 team during the 2026 Maurice Revello Tournament, where Tunisia finished as runner-up.

== Career statistics ==
As of match played 13 May 2026

Appearances and goals by club, season and competition
Club	Season	League			National cup (Note: Includes Tunisian Cup)		Continental		Other		Total	
Club	Season	Division	Apps	Goals	Apps	Goals	Apps	Goals	Apps	Goals	Apps	Goals
Stade Tunisien	Tunisian Ligue Professionnelle 1	2022–23	0	0	0	0	0	0	4 (Note: Includes appearances in 2022–23 Tunisian Ligue Professionnelle 1 playout)	0	4	0
Stade Tunisien	Tunisian Ligue Professionnelle 1	2024–25	3	0	1	0	0	0	1 (Note: Includes appearance in 2024–25 Tunisian Super Cup)	0	5	0
Stade Tunisien	Tunisian Ligue Professionnelle 1	2025–26	20	1	1	0	1 (Note: Includes appearance in 2025–26 CAF Confederation Cup)	0	0	0	22	1
Stade Tunisien	Total		23	1	2	0	1	0	5	0	31	1
Viborg	Danish Superliga	2026–27	0	0	0	0	—		—		0	0
Career total			23	1	2	0	1	0	5	0	31	1
