= Ruben Alte =

Norwegian footballer (born 2000)

- Alte with Viking in 2025

Personal information
- Full name: Ruben Kristensen Alte
- Date of birth: 28 February 2000 (age 26)
- Place of birth: Namsos, Norway
- Height: 1.77 m (5 ft 10 in)
- Position: Midfielder

Team information
- Current team: Viborg (on loan from Viking)
- Number: 18

Youth career
- Bangsund
- –2018: Namsos
- 2019–2020: Ranheim

Senior career*
Years	Team	Apps	(Gls)
2016–2018	Namsos	15	(6)
2018	Steinkjer	5	(1)
2019	Namsos	11	(11)
2020–2023	Ranheim	94	(7)
2024–2025	Kristiansund	45	(7)
2025–	Viking	13	(0)
2026	→ Sandefjord (loan)	9	(1)
2026–	→ Viborg (loan)	6	(0)
- * Club domestic league appearances and goals as of 21:42, 25 October 2026 (UTC)

Ruben Kristensen Alte (born 28 February 2000) is a Norwegian professional footballer who plays as a midfielder for Danish Superliga club Viborg, on loan from Viking.

== Career ==
Alte grew up in Namsos and played youth and—from 2016—senior football for Namsos IL. He moved to Steinkjer FK in mid-2018, but failed to get considerable playing time in the 2018 3. divisjon. He instead started 2019 in Namsos before moving to the youth team of Ranheim IL in mid-season. In 2020, the league was postponed until the summer. Alte was then drafted into Ranheim's first team squad.

Becoming a firm central midfielder in the 1. divisjon, rumours of a transfer to the highest league arose in the summer of 2023. Ranheim's larger neighbours Rosenborg BK showed interest, and Kongsvinger IL even had a bid accepted that was turned down by the player. In the end, the sale took place in January 2024 and Kristiansund BK was the club that managed to get his signature.

He made his Eliteserien debut in April 2024, and started 30 of 30 league matches in the 2024 Eliteserien.

In July 2025, he signed a four-and-a-half-year contract with Viking, with whom he won the 2025 Eliteserien. On 31 March 2026, he was loaned to Sandefjord. He returned to Viking in July 2026.

On 1 September 2026, Alte joined Danish Superliga club Viborg on a season-long loan. He received the number 18 shirt.

== Career statistics ==
As of match played 25 October 2026

Appearances and goals by club, season and competition
Club	Season	League			National cup (Note: Includes Norwegian Cup, Danish Cup)		Continental		Total	
Club	Season	Division	Apps	Goals	Apps	Goals	Apps	Goals	Apps	Goals
Namsos	2016	3. divisjon	1	0	0	0	—		1	0
Namsos	2017	4. divisjon	10	2	0	0	—		10	2
Namsos	2018	4. divisjon	4	4	2	0	—		6	4
Namsos	Total		15	6	2	0	—		17	6
Steinkjer	2018	3. divisjon	5	1	0	0	—		5	1
Namsos	2019	4. divisjon	11	11	0	0	—		11	11
Ranheim	2020	1. divisjon	12	0	—		—		12	0
Ranheim	2021	1. divisjon	23	1	3	0	—		26	1
Ranheim	2022	1. divisjon	29	2	4	1	—		33	3
Ranheim	2023	1. divisjon	30	4	1	1	—		31	5
Ranheim	Total		94	7	8	2	—		102	9
Kristiansund	2024	Eliteserien	30	4	3	0	—		33	4
Kristiansund	2025	Eliteserien	15	3	6	1	—		21	4
Kristiansund	Total		45	7	9	1	—		54	8
Viking	2025	Eliteserien	9	0	0	0	3 (Note: Appearances in UEFA Conference League)	0	12	0
Viking	2026	Eliteserien	4	0	2	1	0	0	6	1
Viking	Total		13	0	2	1	3	0	18	1
Sandefjord (loan)	2026	Eliteserien	9	1	0	0	—		9	1
Viborg (loan)	2026–27	Danish Superliga	6	0	1	0	—		7	0
Career total			195	33	21	4	3	0	222	37

== Honours ==
Viking

- Eliteserien: 2025
