= Daniel Anyembe =

Kenyan footballer (born 1998)

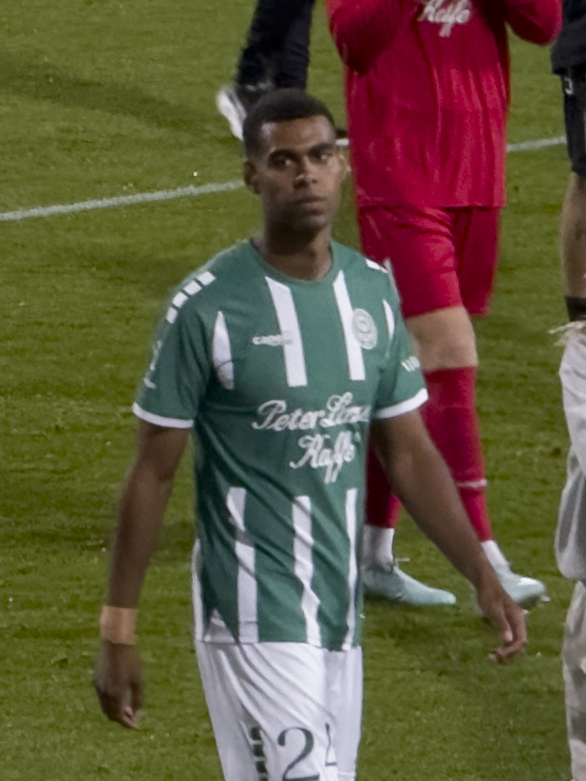
- Anyembe in 2025

Personal information
- Full name: Daniel Francis Anyembe
- Date of birth: 22 July 1998 (age 28)
- Place of birth: Esbjerg, Denmark
- Height: 1.89 m (6 ft 2 in)
- Position: Right-back

Team information
- Current team: Viborg
- Number: 24

Youth career
- –2009: Esbjerg IF 92
- 2009–2016: Esbjerg fB

Senior career*
Years	Team	Apps	(Gls)
2016–2021	Esbjerg fB	100	(1)
2021–	Viborg	136	(3)

International career^{‡}
2015	Denmark U-17	2	(0)
2015	Denmark U-18	2	(0)
2016–2017	Denmark U-19	6	(0)
2017–2019	Denmark U-20	4	(0)
2019	Denmark U-21	6	(0)
2023–	Kenya	11	(0)
- * Club domestic league appearances and goals as of 21:53, 25 October 2026 (UTC) ‡ National team caps and goals as of 19:47, 9 December 2024 (UTC)

Daniel Francis Anyembe (born 22 July 1998) is a professional footballer who plays as a right-back for Danish Superliga club Viborg FF. Born in Denmark, he plays for the Kenya national team.

== Club career ==
=== Esbjerg fB ===
Anyembe was born in Esbjerg, and started playing football for Esbjerg IF 92. In 2009, he joined partner club Esbjerg fB where he progressed through their youth academy.

On 20 September 2016, Esbjerg fB confirmed, that they had extended Anyembe's contract one year until 2018. He would continue to play for their under-19 squad.

Anyembe made his debut for Esbjerg on 8 November 2016 against Middelfart in the Danish Cup, a match which Esbjerg won 1–0. He played his first match in the Danish Superliga on 4 December 2016 against Brøndby IF, which ended in a 1–1 draw. He came on the pitch in the 46th minute, where he replaced Andreas Nordvik. Anyembe signed a three-year contract extension on 1 June 2017 until 2020.

He was promoted to the first team squad for the 2017–18 season in the Danish 1st Division. Anyembe signed another contract extension in August 2018, keeping him a part of the club until 2022. Following promotion back to the Danish Superliga, Anyembe played more regularly as Esbjerg managed to qualify for European football by finishing third.

Anyembe made his European debut on 25 July 2019 in the second qualifying round of the UEFA Europa League, as Esbjerg lost 2–0 away at Stroitel Stadium to Belarusian club Shakhtyor Soligorsk. He was a starter through most of the season, until suffering a knee injury in January 2020 which sidelined him for the remainder of the season as Esbjerg suffered another relegation to the 1st Division.

=== Viborg ===
On 17 July 2021, Anyembe joined newly promoted Danish Superliga club Viborg on a deal until 30 June 2025. He made his debut on 25 July in a 1–1 draw against defending champions Brøndby, coming on as a substitute in the 78th minute for Frans Putros.

== International career ==
Anyembe was born in Denmark to a Kenyan father and Danish mother. He is a youth international for Denmark. He represented the Kenya national team on 28 March 2023.

== Career statistics ==
As of match played 25 October 2026

Appearances and goals by club, season and competition
Club	Season	League			Danish Cup		Europe		Other		Total	
Club	Season	Division	Apps	Goals	Apps	Goals	Apps	Goals	Apps	Goals	Apps	Goals
Esbjerg fB	2016–17	Danish Superliga	1	0	3	0	—		—		4	0
Esbjerg fB	2017–18	Danish 1st Division	15	0	0	0	—		—		15	0
Esbjerg fB	2018–19	Danish Superliga	28	0	2	0	—		—		30	0
Esbjerg fB	2019–20	Danish Superliga	27	1	2	0	2 (Note: Appearances in UEFA Europa League)	0	—		31	1
Esbjerg fB	2020–21	Danish 1st Division	29	0	3	0	—		—		32	0
Esbjerg fB	Total		100	1	10	0	2	0	—		112	1
Viborg FF	2021–22	Danish Superliga	22	0	1	0	—		1 (Note: Appearances in the Danish Superliga European play-offs)	0	23	0
Viborg FF	2022–23	Danish Superliga	23	0	5	0	4 (Note: Appearances in UEFA Europa Conference League)	0	1	0	32	0
Viborg FF	2023–24	Danish Superliga	24	1	1	0	—		—		25	1
Viborg FF	2024–25	Danish Superliga	30	1	4	0	—		—		34	1
Viborg FF	2025–26	Danish Superliga	29	1	5	0	—		—		34	1
Viborg FF	2026–27	Danish Superliga	8	0	0	0	—		—		8	0
Viborg FF	Total		136	3	16	0	4	0	2	0	157	3
Career total			236	4	26	0	6	0	2	0	270	4
