= Lasso Coulibaly =

Ivorian footballer (born 2002)

Personal information
- Date of birth: 19 October 2002 (age 24)
- Place of birth: Bouaké, Ivory Coast
- Height: 1.86 m (6 ft 1 in)
- Position: Midfielder

Team information
- Current team: Viborg (on loan from Auxerre)
- Number: 28

Youth career
- Right to Dream
- 2021: Nordsjælland

Senior career*
Years	Team	Apps	(Gls)
2021–2024	Nordsjælland	45	(2)
2023–2024	→ Randers (loan)	26	(4)
2024–	Auxerre	20	(1)
2026–	→ Viborg (loan)	2	(0)
- * Club domestic league appearances and goals as of 21:59, 25 October 2026 (UTC)

Lasso Coulibaly (born 19 October 2002) is an Ivorian professional footballer who plays as a midfielder for Danish Superliga club Viborg, on loan from Ligue 1 club AJ Auxerre.

== Career ==
=== Nordsjælland ===
Coulibaly started his career with the Right to Dream Academy in Ghana, before joining Danish side Nordsjælland in July 2021. He made his professional debut for the club on 18 July 2021, in a 2–1 league loss to Viborg FF.

On 1 September 2023, Coulibaly joined fellow Danish Superliga side Randers on a one-year loan, with a purchase option included. He scored four goals and five matches in 32 matches for the club in all competitions.

=== Auxerre ===
On 20 June 2024, it was announced that Coulibaly would join French side Auxerre on a permanent deal on 1 July, signing a four-year contract with the club. The deal reportedly commanded a €2 million fee. He marked his competitive debut on 18 August with a stoppage-time winner, scoring in the fifth minute of injury time to secure Auxerre's 2–1 victory over Nice on the opening day of the 2024–25 season, after replacing Gaëtan Perrin in the 86th minute. Later that month, he suffered a serious knee injury, which sidelined him for the majority of the season.

==== Loan to Viborg ====
On 2 September 2026, Coulibaly returned to Denmark on a season-long loan. He joined Viborg on a deal which included an option to buy.

== Honours ==
Individual

- Danish Superliga Team of the Month: October 2023
