= Lucas Riisgaard =

Danish footballer (born 2004)

Personal information
- Full name: Lucas Thorst Riisgaard
- Date of birth: 26 March 2004 (age 22)
- Place of birth: Osted, Denmark
- Height: 1.74 m (5 ft 9 in)
- Position: Winger

Team information
- Current team: Silkeborg
- Number: 21

Youth career
- FC Lejre
- Roskilde
- Vejle
- 2023: Marítimo

Senior career*
Years	Team	Apps	(Gls)
2023–2024	Roskilde		
2024	Såby Fodbold		
2025	Greve		
2025	Næstved	14	(3)
2026	Aarhus Fremad	13	(6)
2026–	Silkeborg	13	(2)
- * Club domestic league appearances and goals as of 11:31, 6 November 2026 (UTC)

Lucas Thorst Riisgaard (born 26 March 2004) is a Danish professional football winger currently playing for Silkeborg in the Danish Superliga.

== Club career ==
=== Youth ===
Riisgaard started playing football at FC Lejre in Osted, where he grew up, and later moved to FC Roskilde's youth team. He later moved to Vejle Boldklub's youth department.

At the age of 18, Riisgaard moved to the Portuguese club CS Marítimo in Madeira in 2023. The stay lasted only a few months, after which he returned home to Denmark.

=== Early career ===
Riisgaard returned to Roskilde in the summer of 2023, joining the club's first team. After six months and failing to make his debut for the club, he moved to Såby Fodbold in the Zealand Series. He played for the Kirke Såby club for one season before stepping up to play for Greve in the Denmark Series. After scoring in two friendly matches against Næstved's second team, he was given a trial with Næstved's first team in the Danish 2nd Division. His contract with the club was announced on 23 July 2025. He played 14 matches for the club, scoring three times.

On 19 November 2025, Aarhus Fremad announced that Riisgaard had signed a contract until the summer of 2028, starting on 1 January 2026. The move became his first full-time professional contract. In the spring of 2026, he played 13 games and scored six goals in the Danish 1st Division.

=== Silkeborg ===
On 11 June 2026, Morten Dahm Kjærgaard was presented as the new head coach of Silkeborg, succeeding Kent Nielsen. On 15 July 2026, Silkeborg confirmed that Riisgaard had signed a contract until 30 June 2031. Kjærgaard had previously managed Riisgaard at Aarhus Fremad, and Riisgaard highlighted his own knowledge of Kjærgaard as a significant reason for the switch. Sports director Jesper Stüker justified the purchase with the desire to add speed to the offensive positions.

Riisgaard made his Danish Superliga debut on 27 July 2026, when he was substituted in the second half in a match against Randers. He scored his first goal on 5 September 2026, when he put Silkeborg ahead 2–0 in the first half away against AGF. The match ended 2–2.

== Career statistics ==
As of match played 18 October 2026

Appearances and goals by club, season and competition
Club	Season	League			National cup		Total	
Club	Season	Division	Apps	Goals	Apps	Goals	Apps	Goals
Næstved	2025–26	Danish 2nd Division	14	3	0	0	14	3
Aarhus Fremad	2025–26	Danish 1st Division	13	6	—		13	6
Silkeborg	2026–27	Danish Superliga	13	2	1	0	14	2
Career total			40	11	1	0	41	11
