= Oliver Bundgaard =

Danish footballer (born 2001)

Personal information
- Full name: Oliver Bundgaard Kristensen
- Date of birth: 15 June 2001 (age 25)
- Place of birth: Randers, Denmark
- Position: Left-back

Team information
- Current team: Viborg
- Number: 23

Youth career
- Hornbæk SF
- –2020: Randers Freja

Senior career*
Years	Team	Apps	(Gls)
2020–2022	Randers	48	(0)
2022–	Viborg	82	(3)

International career^{‡}
2021	Denmark U20	2	(0)
- * Club domestic league appearances and goals as of 21:51, 25 October 2026 (UTC) ‡ National team caps and goals as of 8 June 2021

Oliver Bundgaard Kristensen (born 15 June 2001) is a Danish professional footballer who plays as a left-back for Danish Superliga club Viborg FF.

== Club career ==
A product of the Randers FC youth academy, Bundgaard made his first team debut on 30 October 2019 in the 2–0 win over Viby IF in the Danish Cup. He made his debut in the domestic league on 7 June 2020, coming on as a substitute in the 83rd minute for Johnny Thomsen in a 2–1 loss to FC Copenhagen.

On 31 May 2021, Bundgaard extended his contract with Randers until 2024. Upon signing the extension, sporting director Søren Pedersen stated that "[i]t's so great to be able to extend the deal with one of our own guys, who during the spring showed that he can play at the highest level in Denmark".

On 27 October 2021, Bundgaard scored his first professional goal in a 4–0 win in the Danish Cup over Middelfart Boldklub, a strike from inside the penalty ark after an assist by Vincent Onovo.

On 31 August 2022, Bundgaard joined fellow league club Viborg FF on a deal until June 2026.

== International career ==
On 5 June 2021, Bundgaard made his Denmark U20 debut during a 1–0 win over Republic of Ireland in a friendly in Marbella, Spain.

== Career statistics ==
As of match played 25 October 2026

Club	Season	League			Cup		Continental		Other		Total	
Club	Season	Division	Apps	Goals	Apps	Goals	Apps	Goals	Apps	Goals	Apps	Goals
Randers	2019–20	Danish Superliga	5	0	2	0	–		1 (Note: Appearance(s) in Superliga play-offs)	0	8	0
Randers	2020–21	Danish Superliga	12	0	3	0	–		—		15	0
Randers	2021–22	Danish Superliga	28	0	3	2	8 (Note: Two appearances in UEFA Europa League and six appearances in UEFA Europa Conference League)	0	—		39	2
Randers	2022–23	Danish Superliga	3	0	0	0	—		—		3	0
Randers	Total		48	0	8	2	8	0	1	0	65	2
Viborg	2022–23	Danish Superliga	22	1	3	0	—		—		25	1
Viborg	2023–24	Danish Superliga	32	1	2	0	—		—		34	1
Viborg	2024–25	Danish Superliga	9	1	2	0	—		—		11	1
Viborg	2025–26	Danish Superliga	7	0	0	0	—		—		7	0
Viborg	2026–27	Danish Superliga	12	0	1	0	—		—		13	0
Viborg	Total		82	3	8	0	0	0	0	0	90	3
Career total			130	3	16	2	8	0	1	0	157	5

== Honours ==
Randers

- Danish Cup: 2020–21
