= Nickolai Lund =

Danish football manager (born 1988)

- Lund in 2026

Personal information
- Full name: Nickolai Stokvad Lund
- Date of birth: 28 May 1988 (age 38)

Team information
- Current team: Viborg

Managerial career
- Years: Team
- 2012–2015: Team Viborg
- 2025–: Viborg

Nickolai Stokvad Lund (born 28 May 1988) is a Danish football manager currently serving as head coach of Danish Superliga club Viborg. In addition to various assistant roles, he also led the Team Viborg team between 2012 and 2015.

== Career ==
=== Early career ===
Lund grew up in Sminge, a village near Silkeborg, and started his coaching career at Silkeborg IF. In 2012, he became head coach of Team Viborg, a team competing in the Danish Women's 1st Division at the time. He guided the club back to the Elitedivision in 2015, the top division of women's football in Denmark. However, in his final match in charge, Team Viborg lost 2–1 to Vejle and were relegated back to the 1st Division.

After serving as a youth coach with Randers and Silkeborg, Lund moved back to Viborg to join the men's first team under head coach Jacob Neestrup. He joined as the club's under-15 team while also serving as an analyst for the first team. He was named as assistant coach, as well as a transition coach, on 10 July 2019.

While working to acquire his UEFA Pro Licence, Lund left Viborg to join Copenhagen as assistant on 7 June 2023, reuniting with Neestrup who had become the club's head coach in 2022. He was later fired from Copenhagen in January 2025 due to problems with the team's set pieces.

=== Viborg ===
After the 2024–25 season ended, Lund returned to Viborg under head coach Jakob Poulsen as an assistant. By June 2025, he was promoted alongside fellow assistants Pål Fjelde and Ralf Pedersen to take charge of Viborg's first team after Poulsen departed Viborg to fill a vacant head coaching role at fellow Superliga club AGF. On 16 July, after Viborg sports director Mads Agesen stated the club was unlikely to find a permanent head coach before the opening game of the club's 2025–26 season, Lund was promoted to interim head coach for the club's match against Copenhagen. His debut as interim head coach resulted in a 3–2 loss.

Viborg announced on 24 July 2025 that Lund had been promoted to head coach, no longer being an interim. He signed a three-year deal with the club. His first competitive win for the club came on 3 August with a 2–0 win against Brøndby. Following the 22nd round of the 2025–26 season, Viborg were confirmed for the championship round for only the second time under the league's format. Viborg ultimately finished the season in 5th place, having lost four of their final six matches and narrowly missing out on a European play-off spot.

== Personal life ==
Lund has two children, announcing the birth of his second child in September 2025.

== Career statistics ==
As of match played 22 November 2026

Managerial record by team and tenure
Team	From	To	Record					Ref.
Team	From	To	G	W	D	L	Win %	Ref.
Team Viborg	15 July 2012	15 June 2015	66	32	9	25	48.5	
Viborg	16 July 2025	present	55	24	9	22	43.6	
Career total			121	56	18	47	46.3	
