= Valgeir Lunddal Friðriksson =

Icelandic footballer

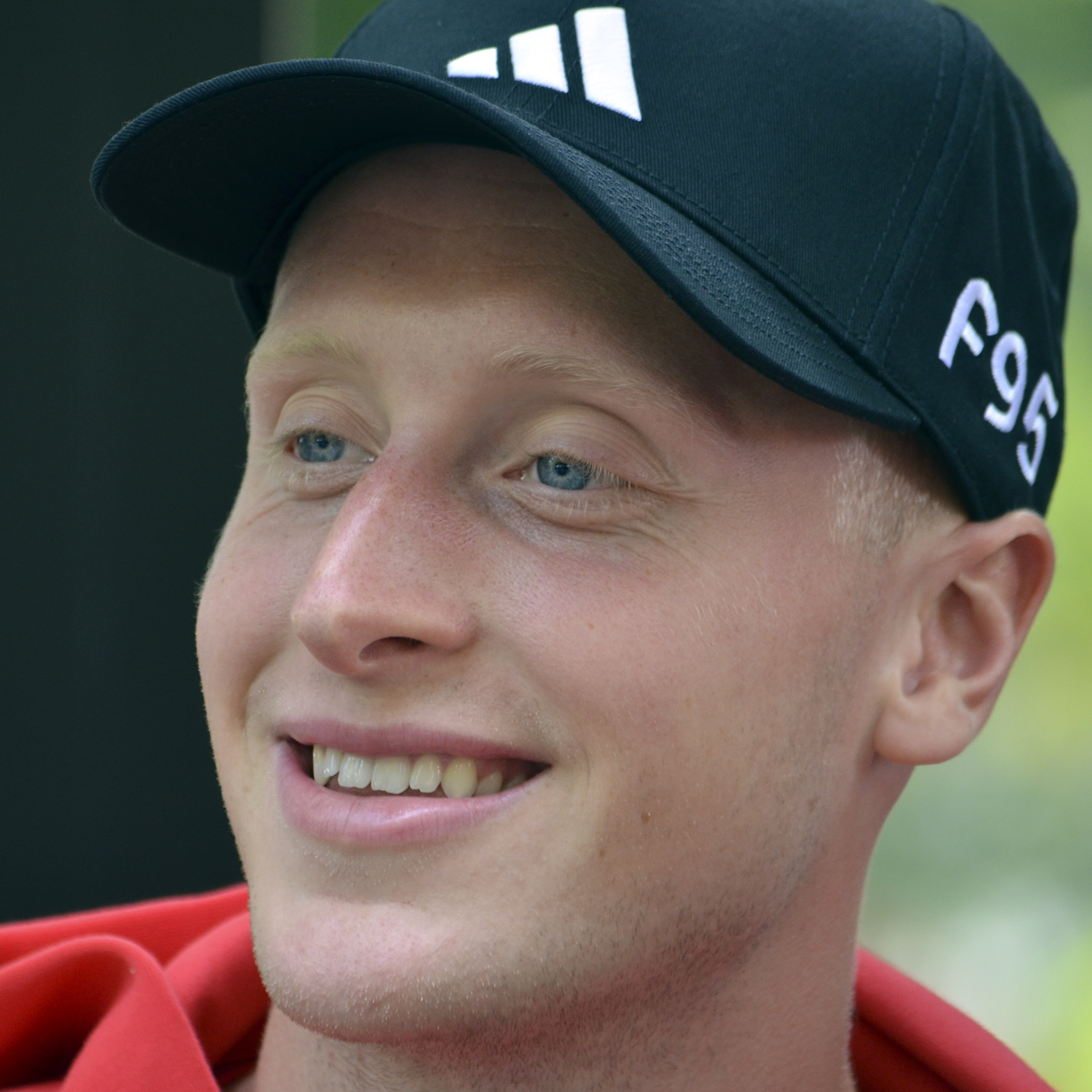
- Valgeir in 2025

Personal information
- Date of birth: 24 September 2001 (age 25)
- Place of birth: Iceland
- Height: 1.91 m (6 ft 3 in)
- Position: Right-back

Team information
- Current team: Viborg
- Number: 3

Youth career
- –2018: Fjölnir

Senior career*
Years	Team	Apps	(Gls)
2018	Fjölnir	11	(0)
2019–2020	Valur	16	(3)
2021–2024	Häcken	66	(3)
2024–2026	Fortuna Düsseldorf	36	(0)
2026–	Viborg	3	(1)

International career^{‡}
2017	Iceland U16	2	(0)
2018	Iceland U17	3	(0)
2018	Iceland U18	1	(0)
2020–2022	Iceland U21	11	(0)
2021–	Iceland	16	(0)
- * Club domestic league appearances and goals as of 21:22, 25 October 2026 (UTC) ‡ National team caps and goals as of 23 March 2025

Valgeir Lunddal Friðriksson (born 24 September 2001) is an Icelandic professional footballer who plays as a right-back for Danish Superliga club Viborg, as well as the Iceland national team.

== Club career ==
On 28 December 2020, Valgeir signed his first professional contract with Häcken. Valgeir made his professional debut with Häcken in a 2–0 Svenska Cupen win over Dalkurd FF on 21 February 2021. On 30 August 2024, Fortuna Düsseldorf announced his signing and that Valgeir would wear the number 12 jersey.

Valgeir joined Danish Superliga club Viborg on 12 August 2026, signing a three-year contract. He scored his first goal for the club in a 2–0 win over Randers.

== International career ==
Valgeir was a youth international for Iceland, and was called up to represent the Iceland U21s at the 2021 UEFA European Under-21 Championship.

He made his debut for Iceland national team on 4 June 2021 in a friendly against Faroe Islands.

== Honours ==
Valur

- Úrvalsdeild: 2020

BK Häcken

- Allsvenskan: 2022
