= Mads Søndergaard =

Danish footballer (born 2002)

- Søndergaard in 2026

Personal information
- Full name: Mads Søndergaard Clausen
- Date of birth: 26 December 2002 (age 23)
- Place of birth: Viborg, Denmark
- Height: 1.78 m (5 ft 10 in)
- Position: Midfielder

Team information
- Current team: Viborg
- Number: 6

Youth career
- NUGF Viborg
- Viborg

Senior career*
Years	Team	Apps	(Gls)
2020–	Viborg	115	(10)

International career^{‡}
2024	Denmark U21	1	(0)
- * Club domestic league appearances and goals as of 21:27, 25 October 2026 (UTC) ‡ National team caps and goals as of 22 March 2024

Mads Søndergaard Clausen (born 26 December 2002) is a Danish professional footballer who plays as a midfielder for Danish Superliga club Viborg.

== Club career ==
Søndergaard joined Viborg FF at the age of 12 from NUGF, a club in his hometown Viborg where he started as a 4-year-old. At the age of 16, he was rewarded with a youth contract in Viborg and shortly after, began training with the first team.

On 24 June 2020, Søndergaard made his competitive debut for Viborg in a Danish 1st Division game against Skive IK. He ended the 2019–20 season with six appearances; three from the start and three from the bench. As of the beginning of the 2020–21 season, he became a permanent part of the first team squad at Viborg and on 17 September 2020, he signed a new deal with the club until June 2023, which would see him go on full-time from the summer 2021.

The following 2020–21 season saw Søndergaard pick up multiple injuries; first an injury that kept him out from late September to mid-November, followed by a meniscus tear which left him out of action for nine months.

Søndergaard played his first match after his serious injury, in January 2022; a friendly match against Hobro IK. Søndergaard finished the 2021–22 season with six appearances in the Danish Superliga.

In April 2024, Søndergaard extended his contract until June 2027. It was also during this spring that Søndergaard made his breakthrough for Viborg. At the start of the 2024–25 season, he was injured and was out for two months until September 2024, when he returned in a match against Sønderjyske.

In January 2025, Søndergaard suffered a fracture in his foot, which forced him to sit out the rest of the season.

== Personal life ==
Mads Søndergaard is the son of former Viborg captain Preben Søndergaard.

== Career statistics ==
As of match played on 25 October 2026

Appearances and goals by club, season and competition
Club	Season	League			Danish Cup		Continental		Other		Total	
Club	Season	Division	Apps	Goals	Apps	Goals	Apps	Goals	Apps	Goals	Apps	Goals
Viborg	2019–20	Danish 1st Division	6	0	0	0	—		—		6	0
Viborg	2020–21	Danish 1st Division	1	0	0	0	—		—		1	0
Viborg	2021–22	Danish Superliga	6	0	0	0	—		1 (Note: Appearance in the 2021–22 Danish Superliga European play-off match)	0	7	0
Viborg	2022–23	Danish Superliga	27	0	4	3	5 (Note: Appearances in the UEFA Europa Conference League)	0	—		36	0
Viborg	2023–24	Danish Superliga	27	2	2	1	—		—		29	2
Viborg	2024–25	Danish Superliga	14	0	6	0	—		—		20	0
Viborg	2025–26	Danish Superliga	23	5	5	0	—		—		28	5
Viborg	2026–27	Danish Superliga	11	3	1	0	—		—		12	3
Career total			115	10	18	4	5	0	1	0	139	14
