= Bruunshåb =

- Town
- Location within Denmark Location within Central Denmark Region
- Coordinates: 56°25′25″N 9°26′40″E
- Country: Denmark
- Region: Central Denmark (Midtjylland)
- Municipality: Viborg
- Parish: Asmild Sogn
- Founder: Bertel Bruun

Area
  - Urban: 0.64 km^{2} (0.25 sq mi)

Population (2024)
  - Urban: 776
  - Urban density: 1,200/km^{2} (3,100/sq mi)
- Time zone: UTC+1 (Central European Time)
  - Summer (DST): UTC+2 (Central European Summer Time)
- Postal code: 8800
- Area code: Viborg
- ISO 3166 code: DK

Bruunshåb is a little town in Viborg Municipality, Denmark. The town was established in 1821 around Bruunshaab Gamle Papfabrik.
