= Žan Zaletel =

Slovenian footballer (born 1999)

Personal information
- Date of birth: 16 September 1999 (age 27)
- Place of birth: Zagorje ob Savi, Slovenia
- Height: 1.85 m (6 ft 1 in)
- Position: Centre-back

Team information
- Current team: Viborg
- Number: 5

Youth career
- 2008–2015: Rudar Trbovlje
- 2015–2018: Bravo

Senior career*
Years	Team	Apps	(Gls)
2017–2018	Bravo	12	(1)
2018–2022	Celje	125	(6)
2022–	Viborg	75	(1)

International career^{‡}
2015–2016	Slovenia U17	5	(1)
2017	Slovenia U18	5	(0)
2019–2021	Slovenia U21	13	(0)
2024–	Slovenia	4	(0)
- * Club domestic league appearances and goals as of 21:26, 25 October 2026 (UTC) ‡ National team caps and goals as of 16 November 2026

Žan Zaletel (born 16 September 1999) is a Slovenian professional footballer who plays as a centre-back for Danish Superliga club Viborg FF.

== Club career ==
Zaletel made his Slovenian PrvaLiga debut for Celje on 20 July 2018 in a game against Aluminij.

On 22 July 2022, Zaletel signed a three-year contract with Danish Superliga club Viborg.

== International career ==
Zaletel made his debut for Slovenia in a January 2024 friendly match against the United States. Previously, he also played for Slovenia at youth international levels with the under-17, under-18, and under-21 teams.
