= Viborg FF =

Association football club in Denmark

Viborg
- Full name: Viborg Fodsports Forening
- Nickname: De Grønne (the Greens)
- Short name: VFF
- Founded: 1 April 1896; 130 years ago
- Ground: Energi Viborg Arena
- Capacity: 10,000
- Coordinates: 56°27′21″N 9°24′7″E
- Owners: Better Holding 2012 A/S; Reedtz Football ApS; Green Heart Capital ApS
- Chairman: Kim Nielsen
- Head coach: Nickolai Lund
- League: Danish Superliga
- 2025–26: Superliga, 5th of 12
- Website: vff.dk
Home colours	Away colours

Viborg Fodsports Forening (lit. 'Viborg Footsport Association'), also referred to as Viborg FF or simply VFF, is a Danish association football club based in the Central Jutland city of Viborg. The club currently competes in the Danish Superliga, the highest league of the Danish football league system. Nicknamed De Grønne, the club was founded on 1 April 1896. As of the end of their 2025–26 season, the club's only trophies are the 1999–2000 Danish Cup and the 2000 Danish Super Cup.

After originally playing their football matches at Eksercerpladsen, Viborg moved into their current stadium, Energi Viborg Arena, in 1931. Following the stadium's reconstruction in the early 2000s, the current capacity is 10,000.

== History ==
Viborg performance from 1930 to 2024

Viborg Fodsports Forening was established on 1 April 1896. The club originally encompassed several sports, including cricket, gymnastics, boxing, and others. Football was not initially a sport included within the club; however, the club won Mesterrækken in 1924, which was highest football league on the Jutland peninsula in Denmark at the time. By 1929, as other sports had separated into other independent organisations, football remained as the club's only sport. For the following decades, Viborg FF competed in the regional Danish leagues before finally reaching the national divisions in 1959, when it qualified for the 4th division after several unsuccessful attempts. Erik Bundgaard was one player involved in the club's achievement, and his 421 matches played for the club were a record until 2008, when Jakob Glerup surpassed his mark.

During the early 1970s, Viborg FF was relegated from the national divisions to the Danmarksserien, but returned to the national divisions in 1974. Since this time, the club has stayed within the national divisions of the Danish football pyramid. After a series of promotions, Viborg reached the Danish 1st Division in 1980, which was then the highest division in Danish football. After only one season, the club were relegated to the 2nd Division and would not return to the 1st Division until 1989. After several years of progress and investing in their youth football programs, Viborg returned to the top level in 1993, gaining promotion to the newly established Danish Superliga, which had been created in 1991. Once again, however, the club were relegated after only one season. In 1995, the club again returned to the Superliga where they would remain for more than a decade.

Viborg FF's highest achievement came during the 1999–2000 Danish Cup. With a 1–0 victory over AaB in the final, the club won the biggest football tournament in the country. The club was given the opportunity to play in the Danish Super Cup in the season following their cup win, defeating Herfølge BK on penalties. The club received an invitation to the UEFA Cup for the 2000–01 tournament, marking their participation in continental football for the first time in the club's history. Their participation would be short-lived however, as they were eliminated in the second round by Spanish club Rayo Vallecano. The same season, the club established full-time professional contracts for all its playing staff. By 2002, Viborg FF had fully established a youth academy of their own in FK Viborg.

While Viborg FF continued to enjoy varying degrees of success in the years after, including a 4th place finish in 2005–06, the club was once again relegated in the spring of 2008. After several more years in the 1st Division, the club became a yo-yo club for the next several years with two promotions and two more relegations between the 2012–13 and the 2016–17 seasons. The club captured their fourth 1st Division title during the 2020–21 season and once more returned to the Superliga. Their first season back in the Superliga proved to be successful as the club reached the UEFA Conference League, after defeating AaB in a European play-off match. The club advanced to the play-off round following victories over Lithuan club FK Sūduva and Faroese-side B36 Tórshavn, before losing 6–1 on aggregate to eventual-tournament winner West Ham United. As of the 2026–27 season, the club remains in the top-flight.

== Stadium ==
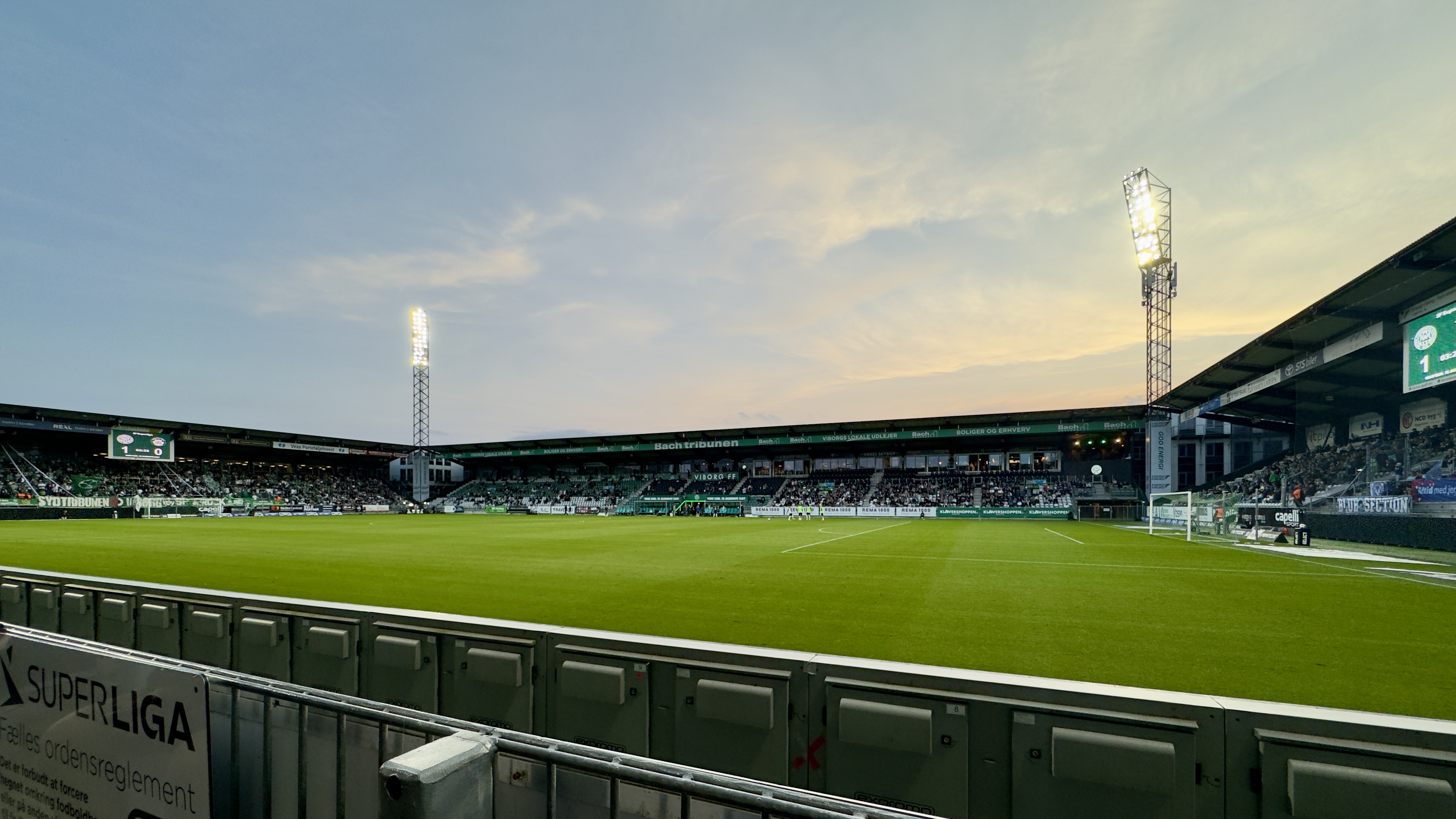
The interior of Energi Viborg Arena in 2025

Viborg plays its home matches at Viborg Stadium, known as Energi Viborg Arena since 2011 due to sponsorship. Originally built in 1931, the stadium was demolished and rebuilt in 2001 at a cost of 62.1 million Danish kroner (93.8 million DKK in 2023). The stadium has a capacity of 10,000, of which 9,566 is seated. The seats are divided in multiple sections with the eastern stand having the highest capacity at 2,792 seats, and the southern stand with the lowest capacity at 2,040 seats. The pitch size is the same dimensions as the national stadium at 105 metres (115 yd) long and 68 metres (74 yd) wide. UEFA, the governing body of football in Europe, has approved the stadium for international use, and the stadium is also home to the Danish women's national football team. The men's national team has also played select matches at the ground.

Viborg Stadium itself is part of the Viborg Stadion Center and is owned by the Viborg Municipality.

== Supporters ==
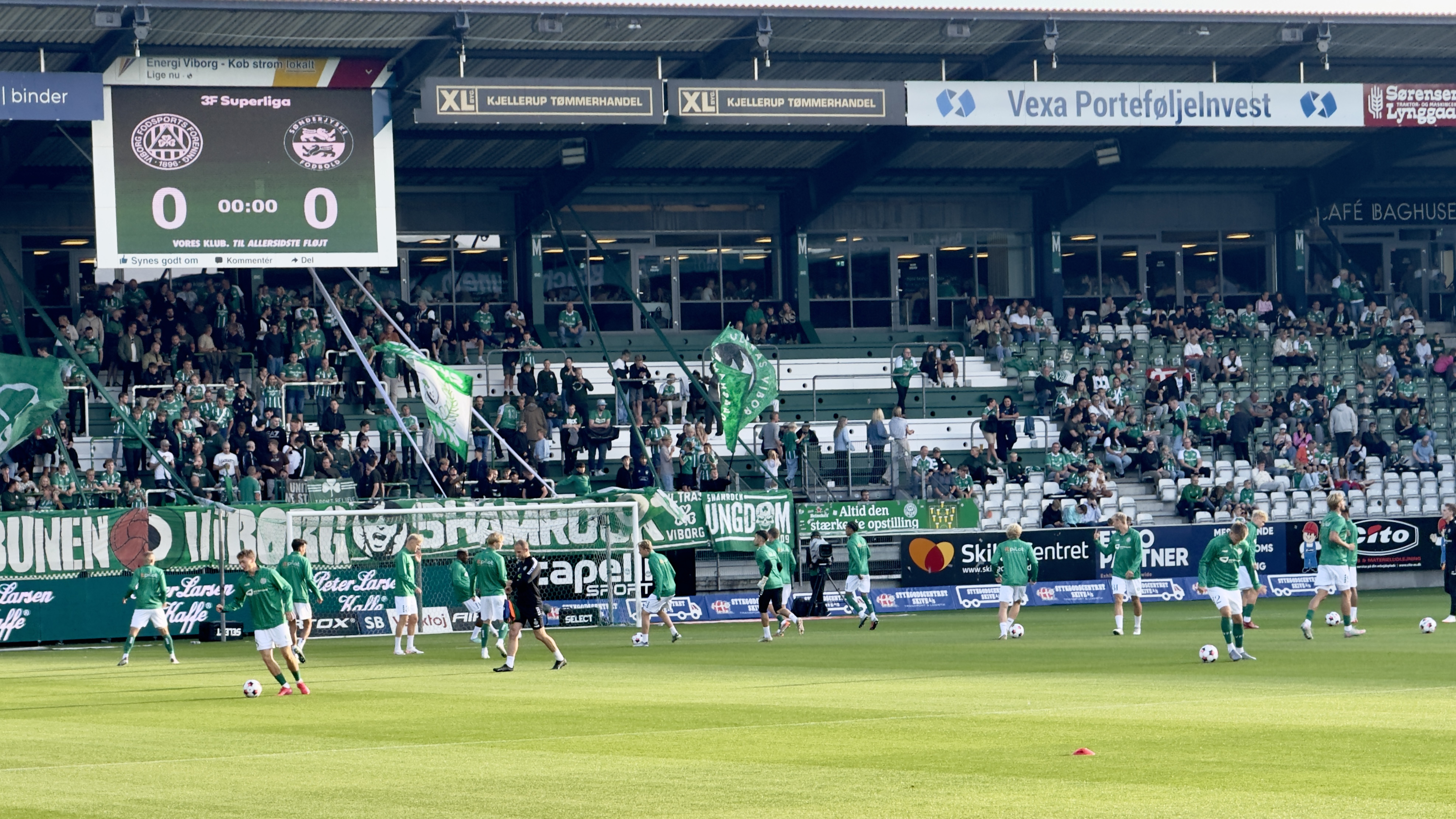
Supporters of Viborg FF at a match in August 2025

Viborg FF has no official Fanclub. A former official Fanclub is The Green Pride. It closed in June 2024 however. The first ultra group was established in 2002, when a group of young adults established Fanatikos. In 2004 a new group, Shamrock Ultras, was created.

Viborg's primary rivalry is with FC Midtjylland, in a game frequently called hadets opgør (transl. Showdown of Hatred) or det midtjyske derby (transl. Mid-Jutland Derby). Viborg fans frequently refer to Midtjylland as FC Vestjylland (FC Western Jutland). One former Viborg captain, Thomas Frandsen, transferred to Midtjylland and his home was subsequently vandalised.

== Players ==
=== First-team squad ===
As of 10 November 2026

Note: Flags indicate national team as defined under FIFA eligibility rules; some limited exceptions apply. Players may hold more than one non-FIFA nationality.

No.	Pos.	Nation	Player
1	GK	DEN	Lucas Lund
2	DF	TUN	Mohamed Iyadh Riahi
3	DF	ISL	Valgeir Lunddal Friðriksson
4	DF	DEN	Lukas Kirkegaard
5	DF	SLO	Žan Zaletel
6	MF	DEN	Mads Søndergaard
7	FW	FRA	Yonis Njoh
8	MF	DEN	Asker Beck
9	FW	NED	Tim Freriks
10	FW	DEN	Sami Jalal
11	FW	DEN	Charly Nouck
13	MF	DEN	Jeppe Grønning (captain)
17	FW	SOM	Osman Addo

No.	Pos.	Nation	Player
18	MF	NOR	Ruben Alte (on loan from Viking)
19	FW	GEQ	Dorian Jr.
20	GK	DEN	Kasper Kiilerich
23	DF	DEN	Oliver Bundgaard
24	DF	KEN	Daniel Anyembe
25	FW	BRA	Giulio Gabriel da Silva
26	DF	DEN	Hjalte Bidstrup
28	MF	CIV	Lasso Coulibaly (on loan from Auxerre)
29	FW	TTO	Roald Mitchell (on loan from New York Red Bulls)
33	MF	DEN	Frederik Damkjer
34	MF	DEN	Philip Keller
36	FW	DEN	Adam Kleis-Kristoffersen
38	DF	DEN	Emil Monrad

==== Out on loan ====
Note: Flags indicate national team as defined under FIFA eligibility rules; some limited exceptions apply. Players may hold more than one non-FIFA nationality.

No.	Pos.	Nation	Player
4	MF	NED	Mees Hoedemakers (at Almere City FC until 16 June 2027)
21	MF	FRA	Bilal Brahimi (at Pau FC until 16 January 2027)

=== Retired numbers ===
- 22 (Denmark) Søren Frederiksen, Forward, (1989–94, 1995–96, 1998, 2001–05)

=== Academy ===
Forenede Klubber i Viborg (English: United Clubs in Viborg), more commonly known as FK Viborg, was the youth academy of Viborg FF. FK Viborg consists of several youth teams ranging from under-12 to under-16. It was founded in 2002 as a collaborative effort between Viborg FF, Overlund GF, Viborg B67, Viborg Søndermarken IK, Viborg Nørremarken and Houlkær IF's best youth teams. The under-17 and under-19 teams, previously under FK Viborg, now operate under Viborg FF instead.

== First-team coaching staff ==
As of 26 October 2026

Position	Staff
Head coach	(Denmark) Nickolai Lund
Assistant coaches	(Denmark) Martin Thomsen (Denmark) Theis Larsen
Transition coach	(Denmark) Simon Vetter
Goalkeeper coach	(Denmark) Kresten Vedstesen
Head of physical performance	(Denmark) Tobias Elstrup
Physical trainer	(Denmark) Anders Pallisgaard
Physical trainer Sports psychologist	(Denmark) Camilla Goul
Performance analyst	Anders Nedergaard
Analyst	Marcus Friis
Club doctor	Michael Weasel
Physiotherapists	Lars Møller
Physiotherapists	Michel Behrndtz
Physiotherapists	Simon Bredvig
Team leader	Søren Unger
Kit manager	Lars Vetter
Massage therapist	Tommy Mogensen

=== Managerial history ===
- (Denmark) Harald Hansen (1926–27)
- (Denmark) Axel Holm (1930–31)
- (Denmark) Sophus Nielsen (1932–33)
- (Germany) Charlie Pohl (1933–35)
- (Denmark) Arnold Thisted (1935–37)
- (Denmark) Valdemar Bodilsen (1937–38)
- (Denmark) Emil Asmussen (1940–41)
- (Denmark) Willy Henriksen (1942–44)
- (Denmark) Valdemar Bodilsen (1945–47)
- (Denmark) Poul Snedker (1947–49)
- (Denmark) Aksel Larsen (1949–50)
- (Denmark) Svend H. Mønster (1950–53)
- (Denmark) Walter Presch (1953–54)
- (Denmark) Harry Albertsen (1954–55)
- (Denmark) Svend H. Mønster (1955–56)
- (Denmark) Walter Presch (1956–57)
- (Finland) Kaarlo Niilonen (1957–60)
- (Denmark) Leo Nielsen (1961–63)
- (Denmark) Rudi Strittich (1964)
- (Denmark) Erik Schou (1965)
- (Denmark) Knud Schou (1966–68)
- (Northern Ireland) Jim Magill (1969)
- (Denmark) Robert Andreasen (1970–71)
- (Denmark) Kaj Stærk (1972–74)
- (Germany) Eduard Bründl (1975)
- (Denmark) Bent Martin (1976)
- (Denmark) Erik Bundgaard (1977–79)
- (Denmark) Svend Hugger (1980–81)
- (Germany) Eduard Bründl (1982–83)
- (Denmark) Erik Bundgaard (1984)
- (Denmark) Jens Tang Olesen (1984–87)
- (Denmark) Hans Ove Andersen (1988–89)
- (Denmark) Peter Rudbæk (1990–93)
- (Denmark) Roald Poulsen (1993–94)
- (Denmark) Ole Skouboe (1994)
- (Denmark) Viggo Jensen (1995)
- (Denmark) Ove Christensen (1995–99)
- (Denmark) Kim Poulsen (1 July 1999 – 23 October 2001)
- (Denmark) Søren Kusk (2001–03)
- (Sweden) Benny Lennartsson (2003)
- (Denmark) Ove Christensen (1 July 2003 – 30 June 2006)
- (Denmark) Tommy Møller Nielsen (2 February 2006 – 9 November 2006)
- (Sweden) Anders Linderoth (1 December 2006 – 30 November 2007)
- (Sweden) Hans Eklund (26 November 2007 – 8 April 2009)
- (Denmark) Søren Frederiksen (8 April 2009 – 30 June 2009)
- (Denmark) Lars Søndergaard (3 July 2009 – 24 November 2010)
- (Denmark) Steffen Højer & Søren Frederiksen (24 November 2010 – 30 June 2011)
- (Denmark) Ove Christensen (1 July 2011 – 31 January 2014)
- (Lithuania) Auri Skarbalius (1 February 2014 – 30 June 2015)
- (Denmark) Johnny Mølby (1 July 2015 – 2 August 2017)
- (Denmark) Steffen Højer (2 August 2017 – 3 June 2019)
- (Denmark) Jacob Neestrup (20 June 2019 – 22 December 2020)
- (Denmark) Lars Friis (16 January 2021 – 25 January 2022)
- (Denmark) Jacob Friis (3 February 2022 – 8 November 2023)
- (Denmark) Jakob Poulsen (8 November 2023 – 20 June 2025)
- (Denmark) Nickolai Lund (16 July 2025 – present)

== Honours ==
=== League ===
- Danish 1st Division
  - Champions (5): Autumn 1991, 1997–98, 2012–13, 2014–15, 2020–21

=== Cup ===
- Danish Cup
  - Winners (1): 1999–2000
- Danish Super Cup
  - Winners (1): 2000

== European record ==
Season	Competition	Round	Opponent	Home	Away	Aggregate	Ref.
2000–01	UEFA Cup	First round	(Russia) CSKA Moscow	0–0	1–0 (a.e.t.)	1–0 (a.e.t.)	
2000–01	UEFA Cup	Second round	(Spain) Rayo Vallecano	0–1	2–1	2–2 (a)	
2022–23	UEFA Europa Conference League	Second qualifying round	(Lithuania) Sūduva	1–0	1–0	2–0	
2022–23	UEFA Europa Conference League	Third qualifying round	(Faroe Islands) B36 Tórshavn	3–0	2–1	5–1	
2022–23	UEFA Europa Conference League	Play-off round	(England) West Ham United	0–3	1–3	1–6	

== See also ==
- Viborg FF (women)
