= List of Danish football transfers summer 2026 =

This is a list of Danish football transfers for the 2026 summer transfer window. Only transfers featuring Superliga and 1. Division are listed.

== Superliga ==
Note: Flags indicate national team as has been defined under FIFA eligibility rules. Players may hold more than one non-FIFA nationality.

=== AGF ===
In:

No.	Pos.	Nation	Player
3	DF	ISL	Daníel Leó Grétarsson (from Sønderjyske)
8	FW	DEN	Sebastian Jørgensen (from (Sweden) Malmö, previously on loan)
16	MF	DEN	Jens Jønsson (from (Greece) AEK Athens)
18	MF	NZL	Callum McCowatt (from Silkeborg)
23	MF	ISL	Mikael Anderson (from (Sweden) Djurgården)
25	DF	NOR	Colin Rösler (from (Sweden) Malmö)
29	DF	DEN	Rasmus Carstensen (from (Germany) 1. FC Köln, previously on loan)

Out:

No.	Pos.	Nation	Player
2	DF	SWE	Felix Beijmo (to Copenhagen)
3	DF	DEN	Henrik Dalsgaard (retired)
9	FW	DEN	Patrick Mortensen (to Brøndby)
40	DF	DEN	Jonas Jensen-Abbew (to (Netherlands) ADO Den Haag)
—	MF	NGR	Ekemini Ime (on loan to Brabrand)
—	FW	GHA	Richmond Gyamfi (on loan to (Norway) Egersund, previously on loan at Esbjerg)

=== Midtjylland ===
In:

No.	Pos.	Nation	Player
3	DF	DEN	Magnus Jensen (from Sønderjyske)
5	DF	DEN	Rasmus Kristensen (from (Germany) Eintracht Frankfurt)
9	FW	DEN	Mileta Rajović (on loan from (Poland) Legia Warsaw)
15	DF	CIV	Djé Beni (from (Portugal) Mafra)
18	FW	NGR	Stanley Iheanacho (from (Portugal) Mafra)
25	GK	NED	Nordin Bakker (from (Netherlands) Heerenveen)
20	MF	KOR	Hong Hyun-seok (on loan from (Germany) Mainz 05, previously on loan at (Belgium) Gent)
29	MF	GER	Kjell Wätjen (from (Germany) Borussia Dortmund, previously on loan at (Germany) VfL Bochum)
90	FW	NGR	Friday Etim (from Fredericia)
98	FW	VEN	David Martínez (from (United States) Los Angeles FC)

Out:

No.	Pos.	Nation	Player
1	GK	DEN	Jonas Lössl (retired)
3	DF	KOR	Lee Han-beom (to (Belgium) Club Brugge)
7	FW	GBS	Franculino Djú (to (Turkey) Trabzonspor)
11	FW	CHI	Darío Osorio (on loan to (England) Crystal Palace)
13	DF	CZE	Adam Gabriel (to (Czech Republic) Viktoria Plzeň)
14	FW	ZAM	Edward Chilufya (on loan to (Israel) Hapoel Jerusalem)
20	MF	DEN	Valdemar Byskov (to (Netherlands) AZ)
29	DF	BRA	Paulinho (to (Brazil) Botafogo)
31	GK	SWE	Liam Selin (on loan to (Sweden) Värnamo)
35	DF	SWE	Bilal Konteh (on loan to Vendsyssel)
39	FW	SUI	Arlet Junior Zé (loan return to (Switzerland) Basel)
43	DF	SUI	Kevin Mbabu (to (Italy) Sampdoria)
58	FW	TUR	Aral Şimşir (to (Turkey) Trabzonspor)
—	DF	DEN	Mathis Konradsen (on loan to Nykøbing)
—	MF	DEN	Jonatan Lindekilde (reloan to Fredericia)
—	MF	POR	Dani Silva (on loan to (Poland) Widzew Łódź, previously on loan at (Cyprus) Pafos)
—	DF	ISL	Daníel Freyr Kristjánsson (to Lyngby, previously on loan at Fredericia)

=== Nordsjælland ===
In:

No.	Pos.	Nation	Player
11	FW	DEN	Alexander Lind (from (Italy) Pisa, previously on loan)
14	FW	EGY	Ibrahim Adel (from (United Arab Emirates) Al Jazira, previously on loan)
22	GK	FIN	Carljohan Eriksson (from (Norway) Sarpsborg 08)
25	DF	DEN	Victor Nelsson (from (Turkey) Galatasaray, previously on loan at (Italy) Hellas Verona)
—	MF	CMR	David Mimbang (from (Cameroon) Brasseries du Cameroun)

Out:

No.	Pos.	Nation	Player
17	FW	CIV	Levy Nene (on loan to (Switzerland) Lausanne-Sport)
20	MF	GHA	Araphat Mohammed (free agent)
22	GK	DEN	Andreas Gülstorff (to Fredericia)
27	MF	CIV	Diallo Sanoussi (to (Greece) Aris)
36	MF	GHA	Caleb Yirenkyi (to (England) Coventry City)
39	FW	ISL	Daniel Jóhannesson (on loan to Kolding)
—	MF	CMR	David Mimbang (on loan to (United States) San Diego FC)
—	GK	DEN	William Lykke (on loan to Esbjerg, previously on loan at (Sweden) Halmstad)
—	DF	GHA	Issaka Seidu (on loan to (Sweden) Göteborg, previously on loan at (Sweden) Ljungskile)
—	FW	DEN	Villum Dalsgaard (to (Sweden) Mjällby, previously on loan at (Norway) Hødd)

=== Brøndby ===
In:

No.	Pos.	Nation	Player
3	DF	AUT	Christopher Olivier (from (Germany) VfB Stuttgart II)
7	FW	DEN	Olti Hyseni (from Sønderjyske)
9	FW	DEN	Patrick Mortensen (from AGF)
15	MF	DEN	Casper Winther (from Lyngby)
16	GK	DEN	Adrian Kappenberger (from Hillerød)
18	MF	DEN	Max Ejdum (from OB)

Out:

No.	Pos.	Nation	Player
5	DF	DEN	Rasmus Lauritsen (to (Greece) Iraklis)
7	MF	DEN	Nicolai Vallys (to (Japan) FC Tokyo)
8	MF	BIH	Benjamin Tahirović (on loan to (Belgium) Genk)
14	DF	ENG	Ben Godfrey (loan return to (Italy) Atalanta)
16	GK	DEN	Thomas Mikkelsen (to Silkeborg)
22	FW	SEN	Ousmane Sow (on loan to (Poland) Jagiellonia Białystok)
23	FW	SWE	Mayckel Lahdo (loan return to (Netherlands) AZ)
31	DF	SUR	Sean Klaiber (to (Germany) VfL Bochum)
42	MF	DEN	Mathias Jensen (to Vejle)
—	FW	JPN	Kōtarō Uchino (on loan to (Japan) Mito HollyHock, previously on loan at (Japan) Vissel Kobe)
—	DF	DEN	Philip Søndergaard (to AaB, previously on loan at (Netherlands) Emmen)
—	FW	SWE	Carl Björk (to (Sweden) Sundsvall, previously on loan at B.93)
—	FW	AUT	Michael Gregoritsch (to (Germany) FC Augsburg, previously on loan)
—	FW	GHA	Emmanuel Yeboah (to (Romania) Corvinul Hunedoara, previously on loan at (Sweden) Halmstad)

=== Viborg ===
In:

No.	Pos.	Nation	Player
2	DF	TUN	Mohamed Iyadh Riahi (from (Tunisia) Stade Tunisien)
3	DF	ISL	Valgeir Lunddal Friðriksson (free agent)
18	MF	NOR	Ruben Alte (on loan from (Norway) Viking, previously on loan at (Norway) Sandefjord)
25	FW	BRA	Giulio (from (Brazil) Ceará)
28	MF	CIV	Lasso Coulibaly (on loan from (France) Auxerre)
29	FW	TTO	Roald Mitchell (on loan from (United States) New York Red Bulls)

Out:

No.	Pos.	Nation	Player
4	DF	NED	Mees Hoedemakers (on loan to (Netherlands) Almere City)
10	MF	DEN	Thomas Jørgensen (to (France) Toulouse)
14	FW	ISL	Ísak Andri Sigurgeirsson (loan return to (Sweden) Norrköping)
16	GK	MNE	Filip Đukić (to Hvidovre)
17	FW	DEN	Osman Addo (on loan to (Sweden) Helsingborg)
18	MF	GER	Jean-Manuel Mbom (free agent)
21	MF	FRA	Bilal Brahimi (on loan to (France) Pau)
30	DF	SLO	Srđan Kuzmić (to (France) Lorient)
31	DF	DEN	Mikkel Løndal (to Hobro)
55	DF	CRO	Stipe Radić (to (Hungary) MTK Budapest)

=== Sønderjyske ===
In:

No.	Pos.	Nation	Player
3	DF	DEN	Alexander Munksgaard (from (Norway) Kristiansund)
10	MF	LUX	Mathias Olesen (from (Germany) Greuther Fürth, previously on loan at (Austria) Grazer AK)
11	FW	GUY	Osaze De Rosario (on loan from (United States) Seattle Sounders)
14	FW	NOR	Teodor Berg Haltvik (from (Norway) KFUM)
18	FW	DEN	Omran Khatar (from HB Køge youth)
21	DF	BUL	Stefan Velkov (from Vejle)
24	GK	BEL	Nick Shinton (free agent)
25	DF	ISL	Brynjar Ingi Bjarnason (from (Germany) Greuther Fürth)
26	FW	GAM	Bubacarr Tambedou (from (Estonia) Levadia)
27	GK	DEN	Berkant Bayrak (from HB Køge)
31	FW	FRA	Ismaïl Seydi (from (Austria) Rapid Wien II, previously on loan at (Portugal) Torreense)
32	FW	GHA	David Boison (from (Ghana) Medeama, previously on loan at Copenhagen youth)
33	MF	DEN	Jacob Steen Christensen (on loan from (Norway) Molde)

Out:

No.	Pos.	Nation	Player
3	DF	DEN	Simon Wæver (to B.93)
4	DF	ISL	Daníel Leó Grétarsson (to AGF)
5	DF	DEN	Magnus Jensen (to Midtjylland)
11	FW	DEN	Alexander Lyng (to Fredericia)
24	FW	DEN	Olti Hyseni (to Brøndby)
26	MF	DEN	Tobias Sommer (to (Netherlands) PEC Zwolle)
27	GK	DEN	Benicio Peña (to Roskilde)
29	FW	KOS	Albert Rrahmani (on loan to Nykøbing)
—	DF	DEN	Alberto Vogtmann (to Middelfart, previously on loan at Roskilde)

=== Copenhagen ===
In:

No.	Pos.	Nation	Player
1	GK	GER	Diant Ramaj (on loan from (Germany) Borussia Dortmund, previously on loan at (Germany) 1. FC Heidenheim)
2	DF	SWE	Felix Beijmo (from AGF)
4	DF	DEN	Asger Sørensen (from (Czech Republic) Sparta Prague)
6	DF	HUN	Ákos Markgráf (from (Hungary) Újpest)
7	FW	ARG	Maher Carrizo (on loan from (Netherlands) Ajax)
12	FW	RSA	Thapelo Maseko (from (South Africa) Mamelodi Sundowns, previously on loan at (Cyprus) AEL Limassol)
33	MF	CZE	Alex Král (from (Germany) Union Berlin)

Out:

No.	Pos.	Nation	Player
1	GK	CRO	Dominik Kotarski (on loan to (Croatia) Dinamo Zagreb)
5	DF	BRA	Gabriel Pereira (on loan to (Brazil) Vasco da Gama)
6	DF	GRE	Pantelis Hatzidiakos (to (Greece) PAOK)
7	FW	SWE	Viktor Claesson (to (Sweden) Värnamo)
9	FW	GER	Youssoufa Moukoko (on loan to (Turkey) Çorum)
11	FW	SWE	Jordan Larsson (to (Saudi Arabia) Al-Ettifaq)
17	DF	POR	Aurélio Buta (to (Brazil) São Paulo)
23	MF	MAR	Amir Richardson (loan return to (Italy) Fiorentina)
25	DF	DEN	Zanka (free agent)
26	FW	NOR	Liam West (to (Norway) Fredrikstad)
29	MF	DEN	Jonathan Moalem (on loan to (Norway) Strømsgodset)
30	FW	TUN	Elias Achouri (to (United States) San Diego FC)
38	MF	DEN	Oliver Højer (on loan to Lyngby)
61	GK	DEN	Oscar Buur (on loan to (Norway) Hødd)
—	DF	ZIM	Munashe Garananga (on loan to Lyngby, previously on loan at (Scotland) Hibernian)
—	MF	POL	Dominik Sarapata (on loan to (Czech Republic) Artis Brno, previously on loan at (Poland) Wisła Płock)
—	GK	ENG	Nathan Trott (to (Wales) Cardiff City, previously on loan)
—	GK	DEN	Theo Sander (to (Sweden) Elfsborg, previously on loan at OB)
—	FW	ALG	Amin Chiakha (to (Norway) Rosenborg, previously on loan)

=== OB ===
In:

No.	Pos.	Nation	Player
2	DF	DEN	Peter Therkildsen (free agent)
4	DF	GER	Julian Pauli (on loan from (Germany) 1. FC Köln, previously on loan at (Germany) Dynamo Dresden)
5	DF	NOR	Ulrik Yttergård Jenssen (from (Norway) Rosenborg, previously on loan at (Norway) Lillestrøm)
6	MF	NOR	Fredrik Ulvestad (from (Poland) Pogoń Szczecin)
9	FW	FIN	Topi Keskinen (from (Scotland) Aberdeen)
14	MF	DEN	Christian Gammelgaard (from Vejle)
18	FW	SWE	Alexander Ahl Holmström (from (Germany) 1. FC Magdeburg)
24	DF	NOR	Mikkel Rakneberg (on loan from (Germany) VfL Bochum)

Out:

No.	Pos.	Nation	Player
4	DF	DEN	Bjørn Paulsen (to Midtals)
5	DF	SUI	Nicolas Bürgy (to (Switzerland) Thun)
6	MF	DEN	Jakob Bonde (to Horsens)
14	MF	DEN	Gustav Grubbe (to Esbjerg)
18	MF	DEN	Max Ejdum (to Brøndby)
19	MF	GER	Tom Trybull (to (Sweden) Halmstad)
20	DF	NED	Leeroy Owusu (to (Israel) Bnei Sakhnin)
24	DF	GAM	Yaya Bojang (to (Portugal) Alverca)
25	FW	DEN	Mads Abrahamsen (to B.93)
30	GK	DEN	Theo Sander (loan return to Copenhagen)
—	FW	DEN	Markus Jensen (to (Portugal) Nacional, previously on loan at (Netherlands) Jong Utrecht)

=== Silkeborg ===
In:

No.	Pos.	Nation	Player
6	DF	FRA	Maël de Gevigney (from (England) Barnsley)
8	MF	DEN	Kristian Kirkegaard (from Horsens)
21	FW	DEN	Lucas Riisgaard (from Aarhus Fremad)
30	GK	DEN	Thomas Mikkelsen (from Brøndby)

Out:

No.	Pos.	Nation	Player
1	GK	DEN	Nicolai Larsen (to Vejle)
6	MF	SWE	Adam Wikman (loan return to (Sweden) Sirius)
8	MF	DEN	Jeppe Andersen (free agent)
9	FW	DEN	Alexander Simmelhack (to (Sweden) Göteborg)
10	FW	DEN	Younes Bakiz (on loan to (Morocco) Raja CA)
17	MF	NZL	Callum McCowatt (to AGF)
23	FW	DEN	Tonni Adamsen (to (Austria) Rapid Wien)
28	DF	DEN	Simon Stüker (to Randers)
—	MF	DEN	Oskar Boesen (to Esbjerg, previously on loan at (Norway) Stabæk)

=== Randers ===
In:

No.	Pos.	Nation	Player
21	MF	SWE	Axel Henriksson (on loan from (England) Blackburn Rovers)
27	DF	NOR	Nikolai Hopland (from (Netherlands) Heerenveen)
29	DF	DEN	Simon Stüker (from Silkeborg)
30	FW	NED	Mohamed Sankoh (from (Germany) VfB Stuttgart II)
36	FW	MLI	Amady Camara (from (Austria) Sturm Graz, previously on loan at (France) Nantes)
77	FW	DEN	Kasper Junker (from (Thailand) Buriram United)

Out:

No.	Pos.	Nation	Player
9	FW	IRQ	Amin Al-Hamawi (on loan to (Sweden) Helsingborg)
19	FW	AUS	Musa Touré (to (Australia) Macarthur)
21	FW	GHA	Ernest Agyiri (on loan to (Malta) Mosta)
28	MF	DEN	André Rømer (to (Iceland) KA)
30	FW	TOG	Thibault Klidjé (loan return to (Scotland) Hibernian)
38	MF	DEN	Max Albæk (on loan to VSK Aarhus)
—	FW	SYR	Noah Shamoun (on loan to (Sweden) Kalmar, previously on loan at (Sweden) Värnamo)
—	FW	GHA	Abdul Hakim Sulemana (to Hillerød, previously on loan)

=== Lyngby ===
In:

No.	Pos.	Nation	Player
4	DF	DEN	Cornelius Allen (from Hillerød)
5	MF	DEN	Oliver Højer (on loan from Copenhagen)
6	DF	ISL	Daníel Freyr Kristjánsson (from Midtjylland, previously on loan at Fredericia)
10	FW	ISL	Ísak Þorvaldsson (from (Norway) Rosenborg, previously on loan)
12	DF	ISL	Davíd Aronsson (on loan from (Iceland) Víkingur, previously on loan at (Iceland) Keflavík)
16	MF	DEN	Zidan Sertdemir (from (Germany) Preußen Münster)
22	MF	DEN	Sanders Ngabo (on loan from (Sweden) Häcken)
24	DF	ZIM	Munashe Garananga (on loan from Copenhagen, previously on loan at (Scotland) Hibernian)
31	GK	USA	Diego Kochen (on loan from (Spain) Barcelona Atlètic)
35	FW	USA	Markus Anderson (on loan from (United States) Philadelphia Union, previously on loan at (United States) Brooklyn FC)
40	GK	ISL	Jón Sölvi Símonarson (on loan from (Iceland) ÍA)
—	DF	FIN	Arttu Hoskonen (free agent)

Out:

No.	Pos.	Nation	Player
3	DF	NED	Django Warmerdam (to (Netherlands) Katwijk)
5	DF	SRB	Mihajlo Ivančević (to (Romania) Corvinul Hunedoara)
6	MF	DEN	Bror Blume (to Helsingør)
9	FW	GHA	Malik Abubakari (to (Portugal) Torreense)
11	FW	DEN	Magnus Warming (on loan to HB Køge)
13	MF	DEN	Casper Winther (to Brøndby)
15	DF	DEN	Nicklas Mouritsen (to B.93)
16	FW	DEN	Asbjørn Bøndergaard (to Fredericia)
20	MF	DEN	Mathias Kaarsbo (on loan to (Norway) Hødd)
24	DF	DEN	Tobias Storm (to (Netherlands) NEC)
31	GK	DEN	Anton Mayland (to (Sweden) Rosengård)
36	MF	DEN	Jonathan Otoa (on loan to Skive)
—	DF	DEN	Malthe Henriksen (on loan to (Norway) Sandnes Ulf, previously on loan at Vendsyssel)
—	MF	DEN	Aksel Jørgensen (on loan to (Norway) Sandnes Ulf, previously on loan at Helsingør)
—	FW	DEN	Adam Vendelbo (to Vendsyssel, previously on loan)

=== Horsens ===
In:

No.	Pos.	Nation	Player
6	MF	DEN	Jakob Bonde (from OB)
11	FW	ENG	Kelvin Ehibhatiomhan (from (England) Reading)
12	DF	CIV	Valassina Diomande (from (Sweden) Sandviken)
18	FW	FIN	Julius Körkkö (from (Finland) Oulu)
19	MF	FIN	Jimi Tauriainen (from (England) Chelsea)
21	DF	GRE	Anestis Tricholidis (from (Norway) Sandnes Ulf)

Out:

No.	Pos.	Nation	Player
4	DF	DEN	Sebastian Hausner (on loan to (Sweden) AIK)
9	FW	CRO	Roko Baturina (loan return to (Portugal) Gil Vicente)
10	MF	DEN	Kristian Kirkegaard (to Silkeborg)
12	DF	CIV	Christ Tapé (to (France) Toulouse)
13	DF	DEN	Mads Fenger (free agent)
21	FW	SEN	Mansour Samb (on loan to (France) La Roche-sur-Yon)
32	MF	DEN	Patrick Olsen (to B.93)
33	DF	DEN	Alexander Ludwig (to Aarhus Fremad)
—	FW	KOS	Muhamet Hyseni (on loan to (Romania) Farul Constanța, previously on loan at (Kosovo) Llapi)
—	MF	CIV	Odilon Kouassi (to (Qatar) Umm Salal, previously on loan at (France) Versailles)
—	FW	GHA	Kwaku Karikari (to (Serbia) Železničar Pančevo, previously on loan)

== 1. Division ==
Note: Flags indicate national team as has been defined under FIFA eligibility rules. Players may hold more than one non-FIFA nationality.

=== Fredericia ===
In:

No.	Pos.	Nation	Player
7	FW	DEN	Alexander Lyng (from Sønderjyske)
8	FW	NOR	Bork Bang-Kittilsen (from (Sweden) Mjällby)
16	DF	DEN	Lauritz Dauerhøj (from Næsby)
17	FW	GRL	Nemo Thomsen (from Brabrand)
19	FW	DEN	Asbjørn Bøndergaard (from Lyngby)
21	DF	DEN	Oliver Vest (from Nordsjælland youth)
22	MF	DEN	Frederik Bunten (on loan from Midtjylland youth)
23	MF	DEN	Jonatan Lindekilde (reloan from Midtjylland)
24	MF	DEN	Casper Jørgensen (from Kolding)
31	GK	DEN	Andreas Gülstorff (from Nordsjælland)
44	GK	DEN	Christian Risom (from Silkeborg youth)
99	GK	DEN	Victor Øberg (from Nordsjælland youth)

Out:

No.	Pos.	Nation	Player
7	MF	DEN	Gustav Marcussen (to Vejle)
8	DF	DEN	Jakob Jessen (to (Turkey) Kasımpaşa)
11	MF	UGA	Moses Opondo (free agent)
16	MF	DEN	Sofus Johannesen (loan return to Midtjylland youth)
17	DF	ISL	Daníel Freyr Kristjánsson (loan return to Midtjylland)
19	FW	DEN	Eskild Dall (to (Sweden) Kalmar)
22	GK	DEN	Christoffer Petersen (free agent)
23	GK	DEN	Mads Eriksen (to (Norway) Egersund)
24	DF	DEN	Kristian Pedersen (to B.93)
25	FW	NGR	Friday Etim (to Midtjylland)
42	GK	ENG	Etienne Green (free agent)
97	FW	DEN	Oscar Buch (to (Spain) Juventud Torremolinos)
98	FW	ALB	Agon Muçolli (to (Kosovo) Llapi)
—	DF	DEN	Daniel Thøgersen (to Skive, previously on loan)

=== Vejle ===
In:

No.	Pos.	Nation	Player
1	GK	DEN	Nicolai Larsen (from Silkeborg)
5	DF	DEN	Valdemar Lund (reloan from (Norway) Molde)
8	MF	DEN	Mathias Jensen (from Brøndby)
11	FW	DEN	Lucas From (from Esbjerg)
15	DF	FRO	Gunnar Vatnhamar (from (Iceland) Víkingur Reykjavík)
18	MF	DEN	Gustav Marcussen (from Fredericia)
23	DF	SWE	Johan Karlsson (from (Sweden) Malmö)
31	GK	DEN	Kasper Kristensen (from Esbjerg)

Out:

No.	Pos.	Nation	Player
1	GK	SLO	Igor Vekić (to (Croatia) Rijeka)
7	MF	DEN	Christian Gammelgaard (to OB)
8	MF	DEN	Tobias Lauritsen (to (Sweden) Kalmar)
11	FW	USA	Jonathan Amon (to (Austria) SKN St. Pölten)
13	DF	BUL	Stefan Velkov (to Sønderjyske)
14	DF	NED	Damian van Bruggen (to (Netherlands) Almere City)
15	DF	GEO	Luka Latsabidze (loan return to (Ukraine) Shakhtar Donetsk)
18	FW	DEN	Anders K. Jacobsen (retired)
23	DF	DEN	Lasse Flø (to (Belgium) Westerlo)
24	GK	DEN	Tobias Haahr (to Middelfart)
27	MF	DEN	Clemens Astrup (to (United States) Wofford Terriers)
30	MF	DEN	Mads Enggård (loan return to (Norway) Molde)
33	GK	DEN	Gustav Knudsen (free agent)
80	MF	ROU	Alexi Pitu (to (Romania) UTA Arad)

=== Esbjerg ===
In:

No.	Pos.	Nation	Player
1	GK	DEN	William Lykke (on loan from Nordsjælland, previously on loan at (Sweden) Halmstad)
2	DF	SWE	Frode Aronsson (from (Sweden) Elfsborg)
7	MF	DEN	Nicklas Strunck (from (Norway) Bryne)
9	FW	GHA	James Ampofo (from (Norway) Strømsgodset, previously on loan at (Norway) Start)
10	MF	DEN	Oskar Boesen (from Silkeborg, previously on loan at (Norway) Stabæk)
24	MF	DEN	Gustav Grubbe (from OB)
25	DF	DEN	Gustav Bjerge (from Midtjylland youth, previously on loan at Hobro)
99	FW	DEN	Adam Ahmad (from B.93)

Out:

No.	Pos.	Nation	Player
7	FW	DEN	Lucas From (to Vejle)
10	FW	GHA	Richmond Gyamfi (loan return to AGF)
12	MF	DEN	Andreas Lausen (to (Portugal) Gil Vicente)
16	GK	DEN	Kasper Kristensen (to Vejle)
21	GK	SCO	Robby McCrorie (loan return to (Scotland) Kilmarnock)
23	FW	DEN	Alexander Ammitzbøll (free agent)
25	DF	RSA	Waylon Renecke (loan return to Copenhagen youth)
27	MF	ISL	Breki Baldursson (on loan to (Norway) Åsane)
40	DF	DEN	Emil Larsen (to (Italy) Lecce youth)

=== Hillerød ===
In:

No.	Pos.	Nation	Player
2	DF	DEN	Andreas Høyer (from Thisted)
3	DF	DEN	Albert Lodberg (on loan from Midtjylland youth)
6	MF	DEN	Hocine Derrar (from Fremad Amager)
23	FW	ISL	Jakob Gunnar Sigurðsson (on loan from Lyngby youth)
24	FW	DEN	Frederik Høgh (from Hvidovre)
26	GK	DEN	Felix Østergaard (from Brønshøj)
27	FW	GHA	Abdul Hakim Sulemana (from Randers, previously on loan)
28	MF	DEN	Gustav Nøhr (from (Italy) Lecce youth)
30	GK	DEN	Axel Mortensen (from Brøndby youth)
31	DF	DEN	Lucas Lundgren (from Vanløse)
47	MF	DEN	Magnus Munck (from Vendsyssel)
—	DF	DEN	Rasmus Thelander (from (Cyprus) Omonia Aradippou)
—	FW	DEN	Basem Alkhoudari (from HB Køge)

Out:

No.	Pos.	Nation	Player
1	GK	DEN	Adrian Kappenberger (to Brøndby)
3	DF	DEN	Cornelius Allen (to Lyngby)
4	DF	DEN	Gregers Arndal-Lauritzen (retired)
5	DF	DEN	Lucas Bøje-Larsen (free agent)
6	MF	DEN	Marinus Due Grandt (to (Sweden) Öster)
15	FW	DEN	Noah Kretzschmar (on loan to Frem)
16	MF	DEN	Hjalte Toftegaard (on loan to Brønshøj)
38	GK	USA	Ayden Huss (free agent)
—	DF	DEN	Rasmus Thelander (to (Cyprus) Enosis Neon Paralimni)
—	FW	DEN	Basem Alkhoudari (to FA 2000)

=== Hvidovre ===
In:

No.	Pos.	Nation	Player
1	GK	MNE	Filip Đukić (from Viborg)
3	DF	DEN	Oliver Juul (from Roskilde)
8	MF	DEN	Oliver Bjerrum Jensen (from Thisted)
11	FW	DEN	Donavan Bagou (from HIK)
18	MF	DEN	Morten Knudsen (free agent)
22	MF	BEL	Nathan Huygevelde (from (Belgium) Union SG)
26	FW	CHI	Roberto Risnæs (from Copenhagen youth)
77	MF	DEN	Abdoulie Njai (from Helsingør)

Out:

No.	Pos.	Nation	Player
8	MF	NOR	Fredrik Krogstad (to (Norway) Stabæk)
9	FW	DEN	Frederik Høgh (to Hillerød)
11	MF	DEN	Mads Kaalund (free agent)
18	MF	DEN	Morten Knudsen (free agent)
20	FW	DEN	Sebastian Koch (to B.93)
30	DF	DEN	Magnus Fredslund (retired)
59	MF	DEN	Marius Elvius (to (Norway) Kristiansund)
—	FW	DEN	Jagvir Singh (to Ishøj, previously on loan at Helsingør)

=== Kolding ===
In:

No.	Pos.	Nation	Player
5	DF	SWE	Gustav Friberg (from (Sweden) Halmstad)
6	MF	DEN	Mikkel Lynge (from Brønshøj)
7	MF	DEN	Tobias Augustinus-Jensen (from Helsingør)
8	DF	DEN	Aksel Halsgaard (from Næstved)
15	DF	DEN	Anton Klaster (from Vejle youth)
18	FW	BLR	Vladislav Morozov (from (Portugal) Arouca, previously on loan)
20	FW	ISL	Daniel Jóhannesson (on loan from Nordsjælland)
24	MF	EST	Markus Soomets (from (Norway) Start)
25	DF	GAM	Mustapha Nyassi (on loan from Copenhagen youth)
29	DF	DEN	Jonas Hansen (from Thisted)
34	MF	GAM	Alasana Manneh (from (Scotland) Hibernian)
42	MF	SEN	Papa Thome (on loan from Midtjylland youth)
45	MF	CIV	Yacouba Ouattara (on loan from Midtjylland youth)
99	GK	DEN	Tobias Elnegaard (from OB youth)
—	GK	IRI	Nima Mirzazad (free agent)

Out:

No.	Pos.	Nation	Player
1	GK	CZE	Jakub Trefoil (loan return to (Czech Republic) Sigma Olomouc)
5	DF	ISL	Ari Leifsson (to (Iceland) Stjarnan)
6	DF	MNE	Nemanja Nedić (free agent)
7	FW	NOR	Mikael Ingebrigtsen (free agent)
8	MF	ESP	Jesús Alfaro (to (Spain) Atlético Central)
10	FW	FRO	Meinhard Olsen (to (Faroe Islands) NSÍ Runavík)
12	MF	DEN	Frederik Møller (to Middelfart)
16	FW	DEN	Jeffrey Papa (to B.93)
20	MF	DEN	Magnus Saaby (retired)
24	MF	DEN	Casper Jørgensen (to Fredericia)
25	MF	DEN	Nicolai Bossen (to Middelfart)
30	DF	GER	Eric Voufack (on loan to (Germany) TSV Havelse)
44	DF	DEN	Pontus Texel (loan return to (Portugal) Mafra)

=== AaB ===
In:

No.	Pos.	Nation	Player
16	DF	BEL	Tibo Persyn (from (Belgium) RWDM Brussels)
18	MF	NED	Mathijs Tielemans (from (Netherlands) Excelsior)
19	FW	JPN	Brian Nwadike (from (Japan) Toin University of Yokohama)
21	DF	DEN	Philip Søndergaard (from Brøndby, previously on loan at (Netherlands) Emmen)

Out:

No.	Pos.	Nation	Player
3	DF	SWE	Adam Andersson (to (Sweden) Örgryte)
18	MF	DEN	Andreas Maarup (to Roskilde)
32	DF	MDA	Christian Tcacenco (on loan to Skive)
35	DF	GHA	Eugene Amankwah (free agent)
37	FW	DEN	Amar Diagne (free agent)

=== Aarhus Fremad ===
In:

No.	Pos.	Nation	Player
3	MF	DEN	Tristan Andrew (free agent)
9	FW	DEN	Søren Andreasen (from Hobro)
14	FW	FIN	Linus Rönnberg (from (Poland) Zagłębie Sosnowiec)
17	FW	DEN	Devon Appu (from FA 2000)
23	MF	ISL	Ingimar Arnar Kristjánsson (from (Iceland) Þór Akureyri)
30	GK	DEN	Tobias Brandt (from Kolding youth)
33	DF	DEN	Alexander Ludwig (from Horsens)

Out:

No.	Pos.	Nation	Player
1	GK	DEN	Kasper Kiilerich (loan return to Viborg)
3	DF	FRO	Martin Agnarsson (to (Sweden) Mjällby)
9	FW	DEN	Kasper Andersen (to (Norway) Odd)
16	FW	DEN	Anders Holvad (retired)
19	DF	FRA	Baptiste Rolland (to (France) Entente Feignies Aulnoye)
24	DF	DEN	Jonas Thorsen (retired)
33	DF	DEN	Luka Callø (loan return to AGF)
47	FW	DEN	Lucas Riisgaard (to Silkeborg)

=== Hobro ===
In:

No.	Pos.	Nation	Player
2	DF	DEN	Mikkel Løndal (from Viborg)
10	FW	DEN	Frederik Christensen (from (Norway) Tromsø, previously on loan at (Germany) FC Ingolstadt)
20	DF	DEN	Anders Noshe (from AaB youth)
29	MF	NGR	Onyebuchi Obasi (from (Norway) Vålerenga, previously on loan at (Sweden) FC Stockholm)

Out:

No.	Pos.	Nation	Player
6	MF	DEN	Frederik Mortensen (to Vendsyssel)
9	FW	DEN	Søren Andreasen (to Aarhus Fremad)
15	DF	DEN	Gustav Bjerge (loan return to Midtjylland youth)
29	DF	DEN	Mathias Haarup (retired)
40	FW	DEN	Mikkel Boye (to (Slovakia) Trenčín)
43	MF	DEN	Alexander Nathan (free agent)
44	MF	DEN	Albert Heyde (free agent)
47	MF	DEN	August Bryld (to Skive)
77	FW	DEN	Valdemar Schmølker (to (Norway) Mjøndalen)

=== HB Køge ===
In:

No.	Pos.	Nation	Player
11	FW	DEN	Magnus Warming (on loan from Lyngby)
16	GK	DEN	Casper Mols (from (United States) Kentucky Wildcats)
25	MF	MKD	Fisnik Isaki (from B.93)

Out:

No.	Pos.	Nation	Player
1	GK	DEN	Berkant Bayrak (to Sønderjyske)
8	MF	DEN	Marc Rochester (retired)
12	GK	KAZ	Dulat Talyspayev (to (Kazakhstan) Kyzylzhar)
17	FW	DEN	Basem Alkhoudari (to Hillerød)
18	FW	JOR	Mohamad Al-Naser (free agent)
19	FW	DEN	Alfred Gøthler (to (Spain) Leganés)
25	DF	DEN	Vinicius Faloni (career break)

=== AB ===
In:

No.	Pos.	Nation	Player
14	DF	BRA	Gabriel Noga (from (Bulgaria) Botev Plovdiv)
17	DF	DEN	Marius Stenner (from (United States) Delaware)
21	MF	DEN	Mikkel Clement (from VSK Aarhus)
24	DF	USA	Aidan Liu (from Austria Klagenfurt)
29	FW	SEN	Saliou Diop (from (France) Brest)
33	DF	DEN	William Warrer (from Kolding youth)
77	FW	SUR	Jermain Fernandes (from (Netherlands) De Graafschap youth)

Out:

No.	Pos.	Nation	Player
2	DF	DEN	Jeppe Gertsen (on loan to Næstved)
9	FW	DEN	Emil Mygind (retired)
34	MF	DEN	Mikkel Brund (on loan to Roskilde)
43	DF	DEN	Noah Ibsen (to (Norway) Kristiansund)
45	MF	DEN	Noah Maale (to Frem)
—	MF	ALB	Steven Bala (on loan to (England) Chorley, previously on loan at Fremad Amager)
—	MF	DEN	Daniel A. Pedersen (free agent, previously on loan at Fremad Amager)
—	FW	DEN	Osama Murshed (to Hørsholm-Usserød, previously on loan at Sundby)

=== Vendsyssel ===
In:

No.	Pos.	Nation	Player
4	DF	SWE	Bilal Konteh (on loan from Midtjylland)
12	FW	DEN	Adam Vendelbo (from Lyngby, previously on loan)
14	MF	DEN	Frederik Mortensen (from Hobro)
15	MF	NOR	Harald Nilsen Tangen (on loan from (Norway) Sarpsborg 08, previously on loan at (England) Notts County)
17	MF	DEN	Sebastian Lodberg (from Midtjylland youth)
27	DF	DEN	Jeppe Sommer (from FA 2000)
30	MF	FRO	Árni Nóa Atlason (from (Faroe Islands) Víkingur)

Out:

No.	Pos.	Nation	Player
3	DF	DEN	Mads Bager (free agent)
4	DF	DEN	Malthe Henriksen (loan return to Lyngby youth)
5	DF	CMR	Hassan Ndam (free agent)
7	FW	DEN	Mostafa Maarouf (free agent)
14	MF	DEN	Akwasi Owusu (to Næstved)
17	MF	DEN	Kasper Kusk (retired)
47	MF	DEN	Magnus Munck (to Hillerød)

== See also ==
- 2025–26 Danish Superliga
- 2025–26 Danish 1st Division
