= Jakob Hjorth =

Danish footballer (born 1994)

Personal information
- Date of birth: 19 September 1994 (age 32)
- Place of birth: Aalborg, Denmark
- Height: 1.93 m (6 ft 4 in)
- Position: Centre-back

Team information
- Current team: Hobro (U19 manager)

Youth career
- Vester Hassing GF
- AaB
- Aalborg Freja

Senior career*
Years	Team	Apps	(Gls)
2012–2014	Lindholm		
2015–2016	Jammerbugt		
2016–2021	Vendsyssel	71	(5)
2021–2022	Hobro	9	(0)

Managerial career
- 2022: Hobro (U23 assistant)
- 2022–2024: Hobro (U23 manager)
- 2025–: Hobro (U19 manager)
- 2025: Hobro (interim manager)
- * Club domestic league appearances and goals

Jakob Hjorth (born 19 September 1994) is a Danish former professional footballer who played as a centre-back.

== Career ==
=== Early years and Vendsyssel ===
Hjorth moved to Jammerbugt FC from Lindholm IF in January 2015, where head coach Bo Zinck described him as "strong, but also technically capable". He quickly developed into a starter for the club, and was signed on a three-year contract by second-tier Danish 1st Division club Vendsyssel FF on 20 June 2016. There, he became part of the team which reached promotion to the top-tier Danish Superliga in the 2017–18 season. He subsequently signed a contract extension keeping him at the club until 2021, after having made 24 league appearances that season.

Hjorth scored in his debut in the Superliga in a 3–2 win over OB. In his third appearance at the highest level, Hjorth suffered a concussion against Nordsjælland, which sidelined him for several months. He made his comeback in March 2019, having also suffered a series of shoulder injuries.

After Vendsyssel relegated after only one season at the highest level, Hjorth started playing more, and headed home the equalising 1–1 goal against Fredericia on 18 October 2020, after an assist by Mikkel Wohlgemuth, who himself had been sidelined by injury for more than a year.

=== Hobro ===
After Skive-manager Martin Thomsen was appointed manager at Hobro IK, effective from 1 July 2021, Hjorth also joined Hobro on a two-year deal, confirming the deal on 23 June 2021. On 29 May 2022, Hjorth announced his retirement from football at age 27 due to a knee injury.

== Managerial career ==
Hjorth was assistant coach for the U23 team in spring 2022 and on 11 July 2022 Hobro IK confirmed, that Hjorth now had been appointed manager of the U-23 team. In December 2024, he was appointed U19 manager at the club.

On 28 July 2025, after the departure of manager Martin Thomsen, Hjorth was appointed caretaker manager of Hobro IK's Danish 1st Division side, together with Emil Antonsen.
