= Frederik Mortensen =

Frederik Mortensen may refer to:

- Frederik Søgaard Mortensen (born 1997), Danish badminton player
- Frederik Mortensen (footballer) (born 1998), Danish footballer
