= Hillerød Fodbold =

Danish football club

- Full name: Hillerød Fodbold
- Nickname: Slotsbyens hold (English: The castle town's team)
- Founded: 1937; 89 years ago as Ullerød GF; 1968 (renamed Hillerød G&IF); 2009 (renamed Hillerød Fodbold)
- Ground: Hillerød Stadium
- Capacity: Bane 1: 5,000 (no grandstands); Bane 2: 1,500 (240 seated)
- Chairman: Jesper Lolk-Nielsen
- Head coach: Christian Lønstrup
- League: Danish 1st Division
- 2025–26: Danish 1st Division, 3rd of 12
- Website: http://www.hilleroedfodbold.dk/
Home colours	Away colours

Hillerød Fodbold is a Danish association football club, located in the district of Ullerød in the western part of Hillerød, that is an independent men's football department of the sports club, Hillerød Gymnastik- og Idrætsforening (HGI). The club is playing their home games at Hillerød Stadium (previously known as Selskov Stadium) at either the exhibition ground (known as bane 1), that can hold 5,000 standing spectators or at a fenced football field (known as bane 2), that can hold approx. 1,500 spectators and features 240 seats. After having been founded as a multi-sports club under the name Ullerød Gymnastikforening (abbreviated UGF) in 1937, the club changed their name to Hillerød G&IF in 1968. With the introduction of a women's football department in 1970, the men's football department was then referred to as Hillerød GI Herrefodbold until 2009, when the senior men's team was renamed Hillerød Fodbold.

A slow ascent from the lower regional league levels started in the 1970s, reaching the highest regional division, Zealand Series, in 1977, and the highest amateur league, Denmark Series, in 1992. After a series of promotions and relegations between the fourth, fifth and sixth levels from the late 1970s up until the late 2000s, the team was sent back to the third best regional league in the 2011/12-season, before they one season later secured four promotions over the course of six seasons to reach the national professional leagues in 2017. As of the 2018/19-season, the club's first men's team play in Danish 2nd Division after winning promotion to the third level from the Denmark Series in the 2016/17-season for the first time in the club's history. At the 1990/91-edition of the Danish Cup, the Hillerød-based team reached the fourth round (round of 16), where they were ultimately defeated at Brøndby Stadium by Brøndby IF.

The Hillerød-based club has fielded two active players on the national football teams, a youth player for the Under-17 and Under-19 teams, and a senior player (Christopher Jakobsen) on the Denmark national football team.

== History ==
=== Ullerød GF (1937–1968) ===
During the 1920s, the Danish trade union movement had introduced a new work day structure, consisting of eight hours of work with six weekly work days (compared to the previous situation of 10-12 work hours with 6-7 work days per week), which was a noticeable change, giving the Danes a lot of extra spare time and starting a wave of health interest across the country. Vagn Christensen — a high school teacher in the period 1936–1940 at Grundtvigs Højskole located at Frederiksværksgade 119, who had previously been on the first Danish gymnastics team sent abroad to perform — noticed an interest in the local community and the idea of establishing a sport club, using the school's old, little gym hall as a base, grew in the fall of 1936. To get a better feeling of the local interest, Vagn Christensen and a small group of initiative takers invited a wide range of interested parties for the first real meeting, which was held on 12 December 1936 at Frederiksborg Højskole (since 1937 known as Grundtvig Højskole). Due to the huge interest present at the meeting, a decision was immediately made to form a work group, consisting of Niels Jensen, Oskar Petersen, Marie Madsen, Martin Petersen and Linda Sørensen, who were tasked to design the new laws and just one day later call for an additional founding meeting of a new gymnastics club. The club was officially founded on 11 January 1937 at the club's first general assembly meeting held at Grundtvig Højskole and was named Ullerød Gymnastik Forening (abbreviated UGF), reflecting the club's location at the district of Ullerød in the western part of Hillerød and the primary sport activity among its members. Dairy worker Niels Jensen became the club's first chairman.

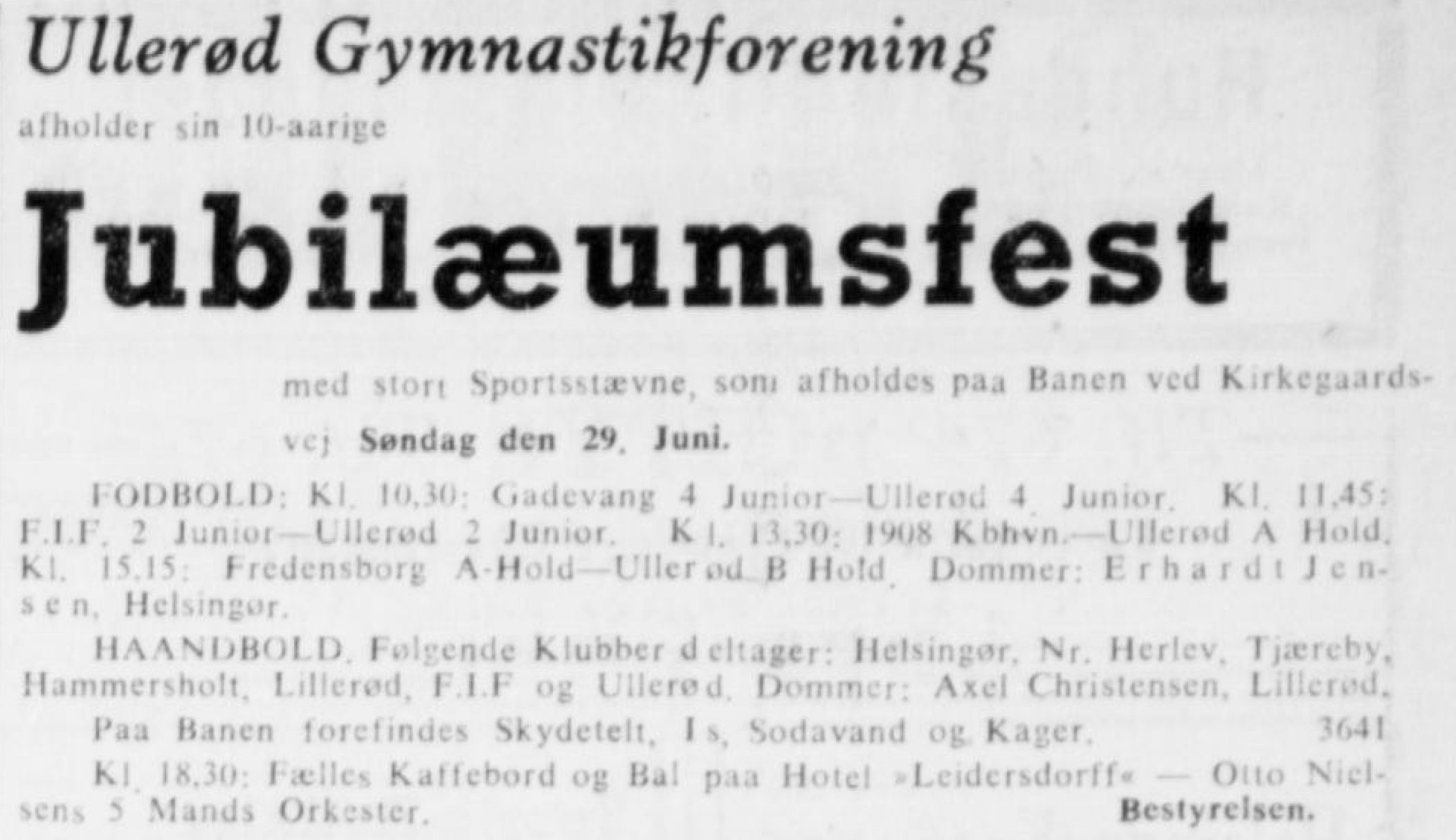
Newspaper advertisement for the club's 10 years anniversary event in 1947.

A few months after the foundation, the gymnastics season for the club's three first teams was over. With spring approaching, the board recognized the need for outdoor sports activities during the summer months for its male members and in May 1937, association football and handball was added to the club's repertoire. In the first season, one men's association football team was created. In 1940, Ullerød GF moved in to their first club house located at Frejasvej, containing a small meeting room on the ground floor and a changing room on the first floor, next to an association football field, that was also used for (outdoor) handball. Athletics became part of the sports club in 1938 or 1939. As a consequence of the new sport activities being included, a reorganisation was decided by the board in 1941, that created five independent sports departments (for athletics, gymnastics for women, gymnastics for men, handball and association football) and one unifying main organisation. At the 25 years anniversary, the club had approximately 800 members, where 500 members were attached to the gymnastics department, which at the time was one of Zealand's largest departments membership wise.

During the early mid 1960s, the local politicians at the city and parish councils expressed their wishes for a merger between Ullerød GF and Frederiksborg IF in connection with the upcoming merger in 1966 between the local municipalities; the central Hillerød Købstadskommune and the surrounding Frederiksborg Slotssogns Kommune and Nørre Herlev Kommune, but the proposal for the club merger was eventually rejected with a large majority by the board and members.

Up until the 1960s, the then small football department did not draw great attention to itself, playing in the lower ranking regional leagues, primarily the SBU's A-række, with players such as Edvin Nilsson, Svend A. Nielsen og Charly Hansen as the most prominent names in the club's first thirty years. In the 1966/67-season of the Danish Cup, the club reached the first proper round under the Danish FA for the first time, where it was defeated 4–0 by Kastrup BK, while reaching the SBU's Serie 1 in 1967 following two consecutive promotions.

=== Hillerød G&IF (1968–2009) ===
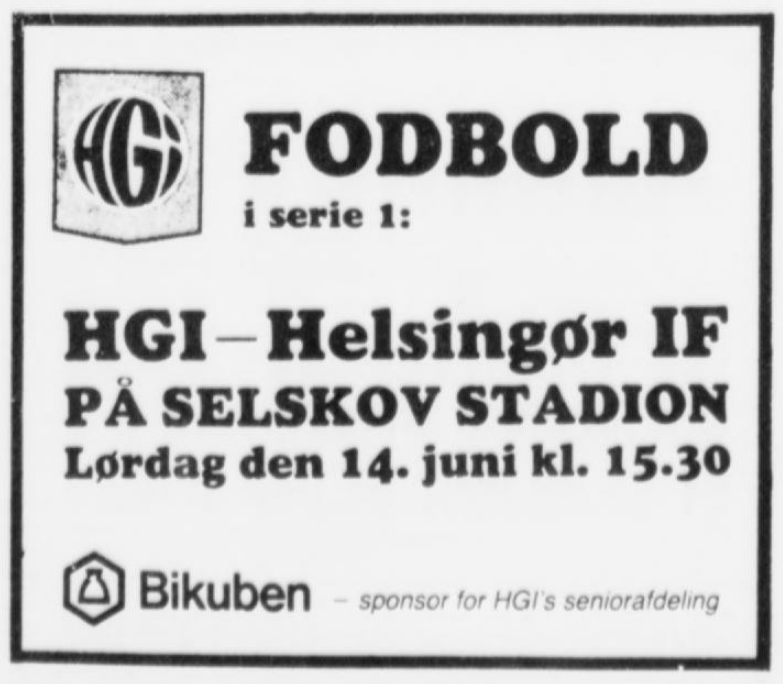
Newspaper advertisement for the SBU Series 1 match on 14 June 1980 at Selskov Stadium against Helsingør IF reserves.

The club was renamed Hillerød Gymnastik- og Idrætsforening (abbreviated HGI) in the spring of 1968 after the debate regarding a name change had been initiated in 1962. A reference to only one of several sports was kept in the name to signify the importance of the gymnastics department and its strong foundation within the club. The need for a name change was in part justified by a judgment from the Zealand FA, that ruled in favour of the away team, Køge, whose players were not able to find the playing ground for Ullerød GF during a league match in the 1960s, thinking that the home team were playing their matches in the district of Ullerød.

The club's first real club house was inaugurated in October 1968 at Selskov Stadium, funded partly by grants from Frederiksborg Slotssogn (on the condition that the work would be done by volunteers) and following a two year long construction period, that was started in 1966, and which underway was affected by a storm in February 1967. After the sport club introduced a women's football department in 1970, the men's association football department started being referred as Hillerød GI Herrefodbold, while the women's department was referred to as Hillerød GI Damefodbold. At the club's 40 years anniversary in 1977, the number of memberships were grown to approximately 2,100, with 1,000 members attached to the gymnastics department. The football department introduced the youth tournament, Copenhagen Tivoli Cup, in 1991. In the spring of 2000, the club house at Hillerød Stadium burnt down and a new club house was not built until some years later, featuring several more changing rooms and a weight training center.

In the 1970s, Hillerød G&IF surpassed the local rivals, Frederiksborg IF as the leading club in Hillerød. While Frederiksborg IF was regarded as the city's old renowned upper class sports club, both the sports management and the active athletes at Ullerød GF/Hillerød G&IF viewed themselves as being a working class club — which in practice was embodied by the local politicians and business community being more responsive and supportive towards Frederiksborg IF. Hillerød G&IF's senior men's team won their regional Series 1 league group in the 1976-season, including winning the Zealand Series 1 League Championship the same year, securing a promotion to the Zealand Series in the upcoming 1977-season for the first time in the club's history under the guidance of playing head coach Finn Wiberg. The team managed to compete in the top regional league for three years until a relegation in the 1979-season sent them back to the second highest league level on Zealand. Wiberg left the club after the 1979-season, but returned for a second round at the club in 1983, managing to secure the club's return to the Zealand Series for a second time.

=== Hillerød Fodbold (2009–present) ===
Initially, Hillerød Fodbold was started in January 2007 as a youth cooperation between four clubs; Hillerød GI, KBK Hillerød, Gadevang and Ålholm IF. Beginning from 1 July 2009 the senior men's football team of Hillerød G&IF were now renamed Hillerød Fodbold. At the end of the 2009/10-season, the entire senior team consisted of homegrown club players.

A completely new team with a low average age was put together for the 2011/12-season, consisting of six U19-players and 22 years old team captain. In November 2015 the youth and reserve men's teams of Hillerød G&IF were also renamed and changed their shirt colours from blue/yellow to orange/black.

== Ground ==
During the first season, the men's association football team played on a grass field behind Grundtvig High School, at the location of the current Teglværksvej. The spot was not ideal, and after a year they instead found a grass field located at the end of Birgitte Gøyesvej down to Pøleåen (a stream running through the district of Ullerød) — due to the location, the field was hence nicknamed skråningen (English: the slope) or grusgraven (English: the gravel pit).

Frederiksborg Slotssogn stood behind the 1958 construction of a new sports facility at the Selskov Stadium (which itself was built in 1954), consisting of a couple of association football fields and a small changing room on a hill. The North Zealandian club moved to the stadium the same year. Selskov Stadium was expanded in 1977, when an old to nearby Gadevang was closed (moving the road from being an extension of Ødamsvej to becoming an extension of Selskovsvej) and three new association football fields were established close to Frydenborgvej. The expansion involved an area, that consisted of underground marsh lands and a water connection from Gribskov towards the lake at Frederiksborg Castle, which complicated the entire construction process. The increasing number of members and others, who used the stadium and its club house facilities, meant that the city council funded the construction of a new club house (opened in 1986), that was almost twice as big as the previous one. A self-management deal in 1989 between Hillerød G&IF and Hillerød Municipality resulted in the establishment of a new independent department on 1 January 1990 with the purpose of managing the sports facilities at Selskov Stadium, and funded by a yearly operating grant from the regional municipality.

For several years, up until 1990, the athletic course in the southwest corner of the stadium had been used for motorcycle speedway races, often gathering attendances of up to 10,000 people, but new safety regulations and several noise complaints from neighbors resulted in this activity being moved to Slangerup. Speedway had worn out the running tracks at the athletic ground. When the local politicians declined to make a bid for the DGI's Landsstævne in 1998, a decision was made to instead invest DKK 15 million on new sports facilities, about half of the amount was to be used on Selskov Stadium, including the athletic ground at Selskov Stadium. A new athletic ground was inaugurated in 1997. At the same time, the club convinced the local politicians that the most important outdoor activities in the city would be placed at the stadium, which therefore changed its name to Hillerød Stadium. In 2005, Hillerød Municipality constructed a new association field, measuring 120x80 meters and name "Bane 8", at the area behind Ødammen in the east section of the sports center, which was officially inaugurated in 2008.

The association football men's team are still playing their home games at Hillerød Stadium, historically at the exhibition ground surrounded by terraces (no grandstands) and a running track (referred to as bane 1) that can hold approx. 5,000 standing spectators or since the 2000s at a fenced football field, that can host approx. 1,500 spectators, and includes a small four row grandstand (referred to as bane 2) featuring 240 seats. In February 2013, two artificial football turfs were inaugurated at the northern part of the sports facility, which are in use during the winter months.

== Crest and colours ==
The first crest was introduced in the club's inaugural year and mounted on top of the official flag of the club. It had a simple design consisting of a decorative interlacing of the three initials of the club, "UGF" for Ullerød Gymnastikforening, encased in a shield with . As consequence of the name change in 1968, a new crest was introduced, consisting of a pentagon-like shaped blue shield with the club's initials, "HGI" for Hillerød Gymnastik- og Idrætforening in black decoratively shaped to form a circle on top of a yellow ring. In 2009, the club's senior men's team was renamed Hillerød Fodbold, and given new colours and a new crest demonstrating its identification with Hillerød Municipality and a desire to be recognised as one. When the senior men's team was promoted to the 2nd Division in 2017, the logo was revised and an orange/black shield was added around the exiting design, returning to the shield-based design.

Logos used in the history of the association football department/club:

Ullerød GF
(1937–19??)

Hillerød G&IF
(1968–30.06.2009)

Hillerød Fodbold
(01.07.2009–30.06.2017)

Hillerød Fodbold
(01.07.2017–present)

== Players ==
=== Current squad ===
As of 3 September 2026

Note: Flags indicate national team as defined under FIFA eligibility rules; some limited exceptions apply. Players may hold more than one non-FIFA nationality.

No.	Pos.	Nation	Player
1	GK	DEN	Andreas Dithmer
2	DF	DEN	Andreas Høyer
6	MF	DEN	Hocine Derrar
7	DF	DEN	Jonathan Witt
8	MF	DEN	Tobias Arndal
9	FW	DEN	Frederik Heiselberg
10	FW	FRO	Poul Kallsberg
11	MF	DEN	Mikkel Mouritz
12	MF	DEN	Nicklas Bjerre-Schmidt
13	DF	DEN	Sebastian Larsen
14	MF	DEN	Solomon Opoku
17	DF	DEN	Mads Julø
18	DF	DEN	Oliver Sejer
19	FW	DEN	Rezan Corlu

No.	Pos.	Nation	Player
20	MF	DEN	Berzan Kucukyildiz
21	DF	DEN	Kasper Enghardt
22	FW	DEN	Saman Jalaei
23	FW	ISL	Jakob Gunnar Sigurðsson (on loan from Lyngby)
24	FW	DEN	Frederik Høgh
25	DF	DEN	William Glindtvad
26	GK	DEN	Felix Østergaard
27	FW	GHA	Abdul Hakim Sulemana
28	MF	DEN	Gustav Nøhr
30	GK	DEN	Axel Mortensen
31	DF	DEN	Lucas Lundgren
47	MF	DEN	Magnus Munck
99	DF	DEN	Albert Lodberg (on loan from Midtjylland)

=== Youth players in use 2025-26 ===
Note: Flags indicate national team as defined under FIFA eligibility rules; some limited exceptions apply. Players may hold more than one non-FIFA nationality.

No. / Pos. / Nation / Player; 6 / MF / DEN / Marcus Voigt	No. / Pos. / Nation / Player; 14 / MF / DEN / Niklas Wilmerskov

=== Out on loan ===
Note: Flags indicate national team as defined under FIFA eligibility rules; some limited exceptions apply. Players may hold more than one non-FIFA nationality.

No.	Pos.	Nation	Player
15	FW	DEN	Noah Kretzschmar (at BK Frem until 30 June 2027)
16	MF	DEN	Hjalte Toftegaard (at Brønshøj until 31 December 2026)

== Managerial history ==
The person responsible for direction of the first senior team has traditionally been given the title of head coach/trainer.

Name	Nationality	From	To	Refs
Poul Petersen	Denmark	1 January 1973	1976	
Finn Wiberg ‡	Denmark	January 1976	31 December 1979	
Orla Astrup	Denmark	1 January 1980	4 June 1980	
Niels Jensen and Ole Thulin †	Denmark	5 June 1980	30 June 1980	
Torben Nielsen ‡	Denmark	1 July 1980	31 December 1980	
Benny Johansen ‡	Denmark	1 January 1981	31 December 1982	
Finn Wiberg ‡	Denmark	1 January 1983	198?	
Torsten Andersen	Denmark	198?	31 December 1985	
Egon Warny	Denmark	1 January 1986	198?	
Anders Sundstrup ‡	Denmark	late 1990s	late 1990s	
Kim Rasmussen	Denmark	200?	30 June 2006	
René Olsson	Denmark	1 July 2006	31 December 2007	
Kim Rasmussen	Denmark	1 January 2008	30 June 2010	
Peter Ebbe Tønder	Denmark	1 July 2010	17 February 2013	
Tommy Schram	Denmark	18 February 2013	3 September 2017	
Kasper Jørgensen	Denmark	3 September 2017	22 December 2020	
Christian Lønstrup	Denmark	1 January 2021	Present	

- † Managers with this symbol in the "Name" column are italicised to denote caretaker appointments.
- ‡ Persons with this symbol in the "Name" column denote status as a playing head coach/trainer.

== Honours ==
=== Domestic ===
==== National leagues ====
- 2nd Division (DBU level 3)
  - Best league performance:
    5th place (1): 2017–18 (q)

==== Regional leagues ====
- Zealand Series (DBUS level 1)
  - Winners (2): 1991, 2014–15
- Series 1 League Championship (DBUS level 2)
  - Winners (3): 1976, 1983, 2012–13
  - Runners-up (1): 1988
- Series 2 League Championship (DBUS level 3)
  - Runners-up (1): 1966
- Series 3 League Championship (DBUS level 4)
  - Winners (1): 1970

==== Cups ====
- DBU Pokalen
  - Best cup performance:
    Round of 16 (1): 1990–91

== Achievements ==
=== League summary ===
- 2 seasons in the Third Highest Danish League

=== Statistical breakdown season-by-season ===
Season		League										Cup	Europe / Other		Avg. Home Attendance^{1}	Top goalscorer(s)^{1}		Refs
Season		Level	Division	P	W	D	L	F	A	Pts	Position	Cup	Competition	Result	Avg. Home Attendance^{1}	Name	Goals	Refs
1937 fall		The club did not start playing league football until 1938										—N/a	—		The club only participated in friendly matches			
1938 spring		—N/a	SBU B-række, Group ?	—N/a	—N/a	—N/a	—N/a	—N/a	—N/a	—N/a	—N/a	—N/a	—		—N/a	—N/a	—N/a	—N/a
1938 fall		—N/a	SBU B-række, Group ?	—N/a	—N/a	—N/a	—N/a	—N/a	—N/a	—N/a	—N/a	—N/a	—		—N/a	—N/a	—N/a	—N/a
1939 spring		—N/a	SBU B-række, Group ?	—N/a	—N/a	—N/a	—N/a	—N/a	—N/a	—N/a	—N/a	—N/a	—		—N/a	—N/a	—N/a	—N/a
1939–40		—N/a	—N/a	—N/a	—N/a	—N/a	—N/a	—N/a	—N/a	—N/a	—N/a	—N/a	—		—N/a	—N/a	—N/a	—N/a
1940–41		4	SBU A-række, Group ?	—N/a	—N/a	—N/a	—N/a	—N/a	—N/a	—N/a	—N/a	—N/a	—		—N/a	—N/a	—N/a	—N/a
1941–42		4	SBU A-række, Group ?	—N/a	—N/a	—N/a	—N/a	—N/a	—N/a	—N/a	—N/a	—N/a	—		—N/a	—N/a	—N/a	—N/a
1942–43		4	SBU A-række, Group ?	—N/a	—N/a	—N/a	—N/a	—N/a	—N/a	—N/a	—N/a	—N/a	—		—N/a	—N/a	—N/a	—N/a
1943–44		4	SBU A-række, Group ?	—N/a	—N/a	—N/a	—N/a	—N/a	—N/a	—N/a	—N/a	—N/a	—		—N/a	—N/a	—N/a	—N/a
1944–45		4	Not finished									—N/a	—		Not finished			
1945–46		6	SBU A-række, Group ?	—N/a	—N/a	—N/a	—N/a	—N/a	—N/a	—N/a	—N/a	—N/a	—		—N/a	—N/a	—N/a	—N/a
1946–47		6	SBU A-række, Group ?	—N/a	—N/a	—N/a	—N/a	—N/a	—N/a	—N/a	—N/a	—N/a	—		—N/a	—N/a	—N/a	—N/a
1947–48		6	SBU A-række, Group ?	14	13	1	0	78	19	27	1st of 8 Lost promotion playoffs	—N/a	—		—N/a	—N/a	—N/a	—N/a
1948–49		6	SBU A-række, Group ?	—N/a	—N/a	—N/a	—N/a	—N/a	—N/a	—N/a	—N/a	—N/a	—		—N/a	—N/a	—N/a	—N/a
1949–50		6	SBU A-række, Group ?	—N/a	—N/a	—N/a	—N/a	—N/a	—N/a	—N/a	—N/a	—N/a	—		—N/a	—N/a	—N/a	—N/a
1950–51		6	SBU A-række, Group ?	—N/a	—N/a	—N/a	—N/a	—N/a	—N/a	—N/a	—N/a	—N/a	—		—N/a	—N/a	—N/a	—N/a
1951–52		6	SBU A-række, Group ?	—N/a	—N/a	—N/a	—N/a	—N/a	—N/a	—N/a	—N/a	—N/a	—		—N/a	—N/a	—N/a	—N/a
1952–53		6	SBU A-række, Group 8	—N/a	—N/a	—N/a	—N/a	—N/a	—N/a	—N/a	—N/a	—N/a	—		—N/a	—N/a	—N/a	—N/a
1953–54		6	SBU A-række, Group ?	—N/a	—N/a	—N/a	—N/a	—N/a	—N/a	—N/a	—N/a	—N/a	—		—N/a	—N/a	—N/a	—N/a
1954–55		6	SBU A-række, Group ?	—N/a	—N/a	—N/a	—N/a	—N/a	—N/a	—N/a	—N/a	—N/a	—		—N/a	—N/a	—N/a	—N/a
1955–56		6	SBU A-række, Group 8	—N/a	—N/a	—N/a	—N/a	—N/a	—N/a	—N/a	—N/a	—N/a	—		—N/a	—N/a	—N/a	—N/a
1956–57		6	SBU A-række, Group 8	—N/a	—N/a	—N/a	—N/a	—N/a	—N/a	—N/a	—N/a	—N/a	—		—N/a	—N/a	—N/a	—N/a
1958		6	SBU A-række, Group 8	—N/a	—N/a	—N/a	—N/a	—N/a	—N/a	—N/a	? of 10	—N/a	—		—N/a	—N/a	—N/a	—N/a
1959		8	SBU Series 3, Group ?	—N/a	—N/a	—N/a	—N/a	—N/a	—N/a	—N/a	—N/a	—N/a	—		—N/a	—N/a	—N/a	—N/a
1960		8	SBU Series 3, Group 8	—N/a	—N/a	—N/a	—N/a	—N/a	—N/a	—N/a	2nd of ? Lost promotion playoffs	—N/a	—		—N/a	—N/a	—N/a	—N/a
1961		8	SBU Series 3, Group 9	22	—N/a	—N/a	—N/a	68	35	30	2nd of 12	—N/a	—		—N/a	—N/a	—N/a	
1962		8	SBU Series 3, Group 9	—N/a	—N/a	—N/a	—N/a	—N/a	—N/a	—N/a	—N/a	—N/a	—		—N/a	—N/a	—N/a	—N/a
1963		8	SBU Series 3, Group 9	—N/a	—N/a	—N/a	—N/a	—N/a	—N/a	—N/a	—N/a	—N/a	—		—N/a	—N/a	—N/a	—N/a
1964		8	SBU Series 3, Group 9	22	—N/a	—N/a	—N/a	—N/a	—N/a	—N/a	? of 12	—N/a	—		—N/a	—N/a	—N/a	—N/a
1965		8	SBU Series 3, Group 9	22	—N/a	—N/a	—N/a	89	31	34	1st of 12	—N/a	Zealand Series 3 League Championship	QF	—N/a	—N/a	—N/a	
1966		7	SBU Series 2, Group 4	22	—N/a	—N/a	—N/a	68	21	34	1st of 12	R1	Zealand Series 2 League Championship	RU	—N/a	—N/a	—N/a	
1967		6	SBU Series 1, Group 2	22	—N/a	—N/a	—N/a	29	42	17	11th of 12	—N/a	—		—N/a	—N/a	—N/a	
1968		7	SBU Series 2, Group 4	22	—N/a	—N/a	—N/a	46	48	21	9th of 12	—N/a	—		—N/a	—N/a	—N/a	—N/a
1969		7	SBU Series 2, Group 4	22	—N/a	—N/a	—N/a	37	59	13	11th of 12	—N/a	—		—N/a	—N/a	—N/a	
1970		8	SBU Series 3, Group 8	22	—N/a	—N/a	—N/a	63	26	36	1st of 12	—N/a	Zealand Series 3 League Championship	W	—N/a	—N/a	—N/a	—N/a
1971		7	SBU Series 2, Group 4	22	—N/a	—N/a	—N/a	55	44	26	5th of 12	—N/a	—		—N/a	—N/a	—N/a	—N/a
1972		7	SBU Series 2, Group 4	22	—N/a	—N/a	—N/a	51	39	28	4th of 12	—N/a	—		—N/a	—N/a	—N/a	—N/a
1973		7	SBU Series 2, Group 4	22	—N/a	—N/a	—N/a	49	24	32	2nd of 12	—N/a	—		—N/a	—N/a	—N/a	—N/a
1974		7	SBU Series 2, Group 4	22	—N/a	—N/a	—N/a	63	29	36	1st of 12	—N/a	Zealand Series 2 League Championship	SF	—N/a	Tonny Jønsson	29	
1975		6	SBU Series 1, Group 2	22	—N/a	—N/a	—N/a	48	20	32	2nd of 12	—N/a	—		—N/a	—N/a	—N/a	—N/a
1976		6	SBU Series 1, Group 2	22	—N/a	—N/a	—N/a	41	21	34	1st of 12	—N/a	Zealand Series 1 League Championship	W	—N/a	—N/a	—N/a	
1977		5	Zealand Series	26	—N/a	—N/a	—N/a	47	38	31	5th of 14	—N/a	—		—N/a	—N/a	—N/a	—N/a
1978		5	Zealand Series	26	—N/a	—N/a	—N/a	42	36	30	5th of 14	—N/a	—		—N/a	—N/a	—N/a	—N/a
1979		5	Zealand Series	26	5	9	12	47	54	19	12th of 14	—N/a	—		—N/a	—N/a	—N/a	
1980		6	SBU Series 1, Group 2	22	—N/a	—N/a	—N/a	40	22	29	4th of 12	—N/a	—		—N/a	—N/a	—N/a	—N/a
1981		6	SBU Series 1, Group 2	22	—N/a	—N/a	—N/a	35	14	30	3rd of 12; Lost promotion playoffs	—N/a	—		—N/a	—N/a	—N/a	—N/a
1982		6	SBU Series 1, Group 2	22	—N/a	—N/a	—N/a	45	34	25	7th of 12	—N/a	—		—N/a	—N/a	—N/a	—N/a
1983		6	SBU Series 1, Group 2	22	—N/a	—N/a	—N/a	36	28	30	1st of 12	—N/a	Zealand Series 1 League Championship	W	—N/a	—N/a	—N/a	—N/a
1984		5	Zealand Series	26	12	7	7	55	30	31	4th of 14	—N/a	—		—N/a	—N/a	—N/a	—N/a
1985		5	Zealand Series	26	—N/a	—N/a	—N/a	35	24	31	5th of 14	—N/a	—		—N/a	—N/a	—N/a	—N/a
1986		5	Zealand Series	26	—N/a	—N/a	—N/a	49	30	26	7th of 14	—N/a	—		—N/a	—N/a	—N/a	—N/a
1987		5	Zealand Series	26	—N/a	—N/a	—N/a	45	45	23	11th of 14	—N/a	—		—N/a	—N/a	—N/a	—N/a
1988		6	SBU Series 1, Group 1	22	—N/a	—N/a	—N/a	44	23	30	1st of 12	—N/a	Zealand Series 1 League Championship	RU	—N/a	—N/a	—N/a	—N/a
1989		5	Zealand Series	26	13	5	8	33	25	31	4th of 14	—N/a	—		—N/a	—N/a	—N/a	—N/a
1990		5	Zealand Series	26	14	7	5	48	30	35	4th of 14	—N/a	—		—N/a	—N/a	—N/a	—N/a
1991		5	Zealand Series	26	18	7	1	49	17	43	1st of 14	—N/a	—		—N/a	—N/a	—N/a	—N/a
1992		5→4	Denmark Series, Group 1	30	14	6	10	51	32	34	5th of 16	—N/a	—		—N/a	—N/a	—N/a	—N/a
1993		5→4	Denmark Series, Group 1	30	13	7	10	61	44	33	5th of 16	—N/a	—		—N/a	—N/a	—N/a	—N/a
1994		5→4	Denmark Series, Group 1	30	11	5	14	48	51	27	12th of 16	—N/a	—		—N/a	—N/a	—N/a	—N/a
1995		5→4	Denmark Series, Group 1	29	14	8	7	57	42	50	4th of 15	—N/a	—		—N/a	—N/a	—N/a	—N/a
1996		4	Denmark Series, Group 1	26	8	2	16	29	50	26	11th of 14	—N/a	—		—N/a	—N/a	—N/a	—N/a
1997		4	Denmark Series, Group 2	26	6	2	18	34	57	20	12th of 14	—N/a	—		—N/a	—N/a	—N/a	—N/a
1998		5	Denmark Series, Group 1	26	11	6	9	40	40	39	6th of 14	—N/a	—		—N/a	—N/a	—N/a	—N/a
1999		5	Denmark Series, Group 1	26	14	5	7	68	48	47	5th of 14	—N/a	—		—N/a	—N/a	—N/a	—N/a
2000 spring		5	Denmark Series, Group 1	13	4	3	6	17	17	15	11th of 14	—N/a	—		—N/a	—N/a	—N/a	—N/a
2000 fall		5	Kvalifikationsrækken, Group 1	14	11	1	2	47	14	34	1st of 8	—N/a	—		—N/a	—N/a	—N/a	—N/a
2001 spring		5	Kvalifikationsrækken, Group 1	14	6	4	4	28	23	22	4th of 8	—N/a	—		—N/a	—N/a	—N/a	—N/a
2001–02		4	Denmark Series, Group 1	30	6	6	18	35	69	24	15th of 16	—N/a	—		—N/a	—N/a	—N/a	—N/a
2002 fall		5	Kvalifikationsrækken, Group 1	14	6	2	6	26	25	20	5th of 8	—N/a	—		—N/a	—N/a	—N/a	—N/a
2003		6	Zealand Series	26	17	3	6	76	31	54	3rd of 14	—N/a	—		—N/a	—N/a	—N/a	—N/a
2004 spring		5	Kvalifikationsrækken, Group 1	14	5	3	6	28	26	18	6th of 8	—N/a	—		—N/a	—N/a	—N/a	—N/a
2004 fall		5	Kvalifikationsrækken, Group 1	14	7	1	6	35	22	22	4th of 8	—N/a	—		—N/a	—N/a	—N/a	—N/a
2005 spring		5	Kvalifikationsrækken, Group 1	18	7	6	5	34	27	27	6th of 10	—N/a	—		—N/a	—N/a	—N/a	—N/a
2005 fall		5	Kvalifikationsrækken, Group 1	14	10	1	3	35	15	31	1st of 8	—N/a	—		—N/a	Jakob Kvist	14	
2006 spring		5	Kvalifikationsrækken, Group 2	14	2	3	9	17	28	9	8th of 8	—N/a	—		—N/a	Allan Petersen	5	
2006 fall		5	Kvalifikationsrækken, Group 1	14	4	1	9	28	40	13	6th of 8	—N/a	—		—N/a	Anders Henriksen	9	
2007		6	Zealand Series	26	3	4	19	37	80	13	13th of 14	—N/a	—		—N/a	—N/a	—N/a	—N/a
2008 spring		7	SBU Series 1, Group 1	11	3	2	6	16	24	11	7th of 12	—N/a	—		—N/a	—N/a	—N/a	—N/a
2008–09		6	SBU Series 1, Group 1	26	14	3	9	60	41	45	4th of 14	—N/a	—		—N/a	—N/a	—N/a	—N/a
2009–10		6	SBU Series 1, Group 1	26	13	4	9	56	37	43	6th of 14	—N/a	—		—N/a	—N/a	—N/a	—N/a
2010–11		6	DBU Zealand Series 1, Group 1	26	6	3	17	42	57	21	14th of 14	—N/a	—		—N/a	—N/a	—N/a	—N/a
2011–12		7	DBU Zealand Series 2, Group 1	22	20	1	1	73	15	61	1st of 12	R2	Zealand Series 2 League Championship	SF	—N/a	—N/a	—N/a	—N/a
2012–13		6	DBU Zealand Series 1, Group 1	26	19	5	2	83	30	62	1st of 14	QR5	Zealand Series 1 League Championship	W	—N/a	—N/a	—N/a	—N/a
2013–14		5	Zealand Series	26	14	5	7	52	33	47	4th of 14	QR3	—		—N/a	—N/a	—N/a	—N/a
2014–15		5	Zealand Series	26	18	6	2	91	31	60	1st of 14	QR4	—		—N/a	—N/a	—N/a	—N/a
2015–16		4	Denmark Series, Group 1	26	10	5	11	43	42	35	9th of 14	R2	—		—N/a	Mikkel Schultz Andersen	16 ♦	
2016–17		4	Denmark Series, Group 1	27	16	6	5	65	31	54	1st of 10	QR4	—		—N/a	Tobias Vistisen Andersen	11	
2017–18	a	3	2nd Division, Group 1	14	2	4	8	18	35	10	8th of 8	QR4	—		—N/a	Tobias Vistisen Andersen	17	
2017–18	s	3	2nd Division, Qualification Play	22	11	1	10	47	40	34	5th of 12	QR4	—		—N/a	Tobias Vistisen Andersen	17	
2018–19	a	3	2nd Division East	—N/a	—N/a	—N/a	—N/a	—N/a	—N/a	—N/a	—N/a	R3	—		—N/a	—N/a	—N/a	—N/a
2018–19	s	3	—N/a	—N/a	—N/a	—N/a	—N/a	—N/a	—N/a	—N/a	—N/a	R3	—		—N/a	—N/a	—N/a	—N/a

^{1}: League games only, not including championship, promotion and relegation play-offs.
