= Tobias Arndal =

Danish footballer (born 1997)

Personal information
- Full name: Tobias Arndal
- Date of birth: 1 September 1997 (age 29)
- Place of birth: Tarup, Denmark
- Position: Winger

Team information
- Current team: Hillerød
- Number: 8

Youth career
- Tarup-Paarup IF

Senior career*
Years	Team	Apps	(Gls)
2013–2017	Oure FA	?	(?)
2017–2019	Horsens	30	(2)
2019	→ Næstved (loan)	0	(0)
2019–2020	Arendal	25	(4)
2021–	Hillerød	138	(19)
- * Club domestic league appearances and goals as of 2 June 2026

Tobias Arndal (born 1 September 1997) is a Danish professional footballer who plays as a midfielder for Danish 1st Division club Hillerød.

== Career ==
=== AC Horsens ===
Arndal started his career in Tarup-Paarup IF, and later joined Oure FA, where he played as a senior player for three years in the Funen Series and Denmark Series. In July 2017, Arndal joined AC Horsens on a one-year contract after a successful trial.

Arndal was loaned out from AC Horsens to Næstved on 31 January 2019 for the rest of the season. However, he did not become eligible to play for the club because they didn't got his license registered in time. AC Horsens then decided to recall the player on 17 March and registered him so he could play the rest of the season with Horsens.

On 12 June 2019, it was confirmed, that Arndal's contract had been terminated by mutual consent.

=== Arendal ===
On 4 July 2019, Arndal joined Norwegian club Arendal on a one-and-a-half-year contract.

=== Later career ===
On 18 February 2021, Arndal returned to Denmark and joined Danish 2nd Division club Hillerød.
