= Oscar Meedom =

Danish footballer (born 2005)

Personal information
- Full name: Oscar Nørgaard Meedom
- Date of birth: 6 August 2005 (age 21)
- Place of birth: Sunds, Denmark
- Position: Right winger

Team information
- Current team: Hobro
- Number: 16

Youth career
- Sunds IF
- Midtjylland
- 2020–2024: AaB

Senior career*
Years	Team	Apps	(Gls)
2022–2024	AaB	1	(0)
2024–	Hobro	18	(1)

International career
2021	Denmark U16	2	(0)
- * Club domestic league appearances and goals as of 2 June 2026

Oscar Nørgaard Meedom (born 6 August 2005) is a Danish professional footballer who plays as a right winger for Danish 1st Division club Hobro IK.

== Career ==
=== AaB ===
Born in Sunds, Meedom started his career at his childhood club Sunds IF and then moved FC Midtjylland at the age of 11. He left Midtjylland in the summer 2020 and joined AaB. During the spring of 2022, 16-year-old Meedom began training with the first team and was selected several times for the gross squad. On 22 May 2022 Meedom made his official debut for AaB in a match against F.C. Copenhagen, coming off the bench for the last few minutes of the match.

After his debut, Meedom didn't play a first-team game until 15 August 2023, when he played just 25 minutes in a cup match.

=== Hobro IK ===
At the end of June 2024, Meedom signed a deal until June 2027 with Danish 1st Division club Hobro IK. He made his debut on 19 August 2024 in a league game against FC Roskilde.
