= Kasper Enghardt =

Danish footballer (born 1992)

Personal information
- Full name: Kasper Enghardt Pedersen
- Date of birth: 27 May 1992 (age 34)
- Place of birth: Gladsaxe, Denmark
- Height: 1.86 m (6 ft 1 in)
- Position: Centre-back

Team information
- Current team: Hillerød
- Number: 21

Youth career
- Hillerød
- AB

Senior career*
Years	Team	Apps	(Gls)
2011–2015	FC Helsingør (Note: Elite 3000 changed its name to FC Helsingør in 2012.)	140	(9)
2016–2019	Randers FC	86	(3)
2019–2021	Lyngby	61	(1)
2021–2024	FC Helsingør	65	(0)
2024–	Hillerød	40	(0)
- * Club domestic league appearances and goals as of 2 June 2026

Kasper Enghardt Pedersen (Danish pronunciation: [ˈeŋhɑˀt]; born 27 May 1992) is a Danish professional footballer who plays as a centre-back for Danish 1st Division club Hillerød.

A versatile defender, Enghardt captained FC Helsingør to promotion from the Danish third tier to second tier, before being signed by Superliga club Randers FC. After three years in Randers, he moved to Lyngby Boldklub.

== Career ==
=== Helsingør ===
Enghardt came to Danish third tier club FC Helsingør, then named Elite 3000, in 2011 after coming through the ranks in the academy of AB. After establishing himself as a regular starter in defense, he signed a one-year contract extension in June 2013. The following season, Enghardt was appointed as club captain at only 21 years of age, and signed a one-and-a-half-year contract extension in March 2014.

Enghardt captained FC Helsingør to promotion to the Danish second tier during the 2014–15 season, with the club finishing first in the Eastern division. Preparing for the new season in a higher division, Helsingør extended Enghardt's contract another two years.

=== Randers ===
On 1 June 2016, Danish Superliga club Randers FC announced the signing of Enghardt, with the player announced to sign a three-year contract with the club. The transfer was called the largest sale in FC Helsingør history by their chairman Janus Kyhl.

On 12 August, Enghardt made his competitive debut for Randers, coming on as a 90th-minute substitute for Kasper Fisker in a 1–0 away win over Viborg FF. After regular centre-backs Mads Fenger and Mads Agesen suffered injuries during the fall, Enghardt, who had mostly played holding midfielder in his career, stepped in and played centre-back. He afterwards became a full-time starter for Randers in the heart of defense after the departure of Fenger in June 2017. Enghardt made 34 total appearances in his first season in the Superliga, scoring one goal.

After three seasons in Randers, Enghardt announced in January 2019 that he would leave Randers FC when his contract expired, citing a desire to try something new. He ended his tenure for the club with 90 total appearances in which he scored three goals.

=== Lyngby ===
On 4 July 2019, Enghardt joined newly promoted Superliga club Lyngby Boldklub. He made his competitive debut for Lyngby on 14 July as a starter in a 2–0 home win over AaB. During his time at the club, he grew out to become team captain.

=== Return to Helsingør ===
On 12 June 2021, after Lyngby suffered relegation to the second tier, Enghardt signed a three-year contract with his former club Helsingør, also competing in the second tier. After signing, he stated that his ambition was to lead the club back to the Danish Superliga.

=== Return to Hillerød ===
On July 1, 2024, Hillerød confirmed the return of Enhardt, who joined the club on a deal until June 2026.

== Personal life ==
In 2016, while playing on a semi-professional contract for Helsingør, Enghardt graduated as Bachelor of Engineering and was appointed as enterprise resource planner for the construction of the Copenhagen Metro. He was responsible for overseeing the connection between Frederiksberg and Enghave Plads. After signing a fully professional contract with Randers FC, he resigned from the job.
