= Mads Justesen =

Danish footballer (born 1982)

Personal information
- Full name: Mads Bærentsen Justesen
- Date of birth: 31 December 1982 (age 43)
- Place of birth: Hvilsom, Denmark
- Height: 1.96 m (6 ft 5 in)
- Position: Centre-back

Youth career
- Hobro IK
- Viborg FF
- FC Nordjylland

Senior career*
Years	Team	Apps	(Gls)
2004–2018	Hobro IK	333	(34)
- * Club domestic league appearances and goals

Mads Bærentsen Justesen (born 31 December 1982) is a Danish former professional footballer who played his entire career for Hobro IK.

== Career ==
Justesen had a part-time job as upper secondary school teacher, due to Hobro's limited success in Danish football. However, the club reached the Danish Superliga after a great 2013–14 Danish 1st Division campaign, where the small club reached promotion after a goal by Justesen against Brønshøj BK. Justesen was one of the players who helped Hobro with promotion from the Danish fourth tier to the Danish Superliga.

After 14 years at Hobro, Justesen announced that he would retire at the end of the 2017–18 season but continue at the club as a Sales Manager. On 4 March 2019 Hobro confirmed, that Justesen had decided to step back from the position. In the following years, Justesen was part of the club's two boards; Respectively as a board member of Hobro IK A/S and as chairman of the association Hobro IK af 1913.

In June 2024 it was confirmed that Justesen, as of 1 September 2024, took up the position as CEO of Hobro IK.
