= William Lykke =

Danish footballer (born 2004)

Personal information
- Full name: William Johannes Lykke
- Date of birth: 28 September 2004 (age 22)
- Place of birth: Allerød, Denmark
- Height: 1.88 m (6 ft 2 in)
- Position: Goalkeeper

Team information
- Current team: Esbjerg (on loan from Nordsjælland)
- Number: 1

Youth career
- –2016: Allerød
- 2016–2023: Nordsjælland

Senior career*
Years	Team	Apps	(Gls)
2023–	Nordsjælland	7	(0)
2023–2024	→ Hillerød (loan)	26	(0)
2026	→ Halmstad (loan)	1	(0)
2026–	→ Esbjerg (loan)	0	(0)

International career^{‡}
2022	Denmark U18	1	(0)
2022–2023	Denmark U19	5	(0)
2023–2024	Denmark U20	4	(0)
2024–	Denmark U21	3	(0)
- * Club domestic league appearances and goals as of 17:25, 28 April 2026 (UTC) ‡ National team caps and goals as of 14 November 2025

William Johannes Lykke (born 28 September 2004) is a Danish footballer who plays as a goalkeeper for Danish 1st Division club Esbjerg fB, on loan from Danish Superliga club FC Nordsjælland.

== Club career ==
=== Nordsjælland ===
Lykke joined FC Nordsjælland as an under-12 player from hometown club Allerød. There, he worked his way up through the club's youth system and, at the age of 18, was loaned out ahead of the 2023–24 season to Hillerød Fodbold, a club in the Danish 1st Division, in pursuit of senior experience.

After a loan spell that saw him make 26 appearances for Hillerød, Lykke returned to Nordsjælland following the end of the season. That same summer, Lykke was permanently promoted to Nordsjælland's first-team squad and also extended his contract until June 2028.

On 23 October 2024, Lykke made his official debut, starting in goal in a Danish Cup match against Brabrand IF. Despite saving a penalty in the shootout, Nordsjælland ultimately lost the match and were knocked out of the cup.

On 30 March 2025, Lykke made his Danish Superliga debut, starting in the 2–0 defeat to AGF. However, Lykke became a major talking point after the match, as he was involved in both of the game's goals, which were described by the media as "two major blunders." However, Lykke was given a second chance in the following match, where he again started—this time against Copenhagen.

On 14 January 2026 it was confirmed, that Lykke had signed a new contract with Nordsjælland until June 2029 and at the same time had been loaned out to Swedish Allsvenskan club Halmstads BK until the end of 2026.

== Career statistics ==
As of match played 28 April 2026

Appearances and goals by club, season and competition
Club	Season	League			Cup		Europe		Other		Total	
Club	Season	Division	Apps	Goals	Apps	Goals	Apps	Goals	Apps	Goals	Apps	Goals
Nordsjælland	2024–25	Danish Superliga	2	0	1	0	—		—		3	0
Nordsjælland	2025–26	Danish Superliga	5	0	0	0	—		—		5	0
Nordsjælland	Total		7	0	1	0	0	0	—		8	0
Hillerød (loan)	2024–25	Danish 1st Division	26	0	—		—		—		26	0
Halmstad (loan)	2026	Allsvenskan	1	0	1	0	—		—		2	0
Esbjerg (loan)	2026–27	Danish 1st Division	0	0	0	0	—		—		0	0
Career total			34	0	2	0	0	0	0	0	36	0
