= Baptiste Rolland =

French footballer (born 2003)

Personal information
- Full name: Baptiste Jean Rolland
- Date of birth: 14 January 2003 (age 23)
- Place of birth: Seclin, France
- Height: 1.86 m (6 ft 1 in)
- Position: Centre-back

Team information
- Current team: Aarhus Fremad
- Number: 19

Youth career
- Lille
- 2023: Lyngby

Senior career*
Years	Team	Apps	(Gls)
2021–2022	Lille B	13	(0)
2023–2025	Lyngby	10	(0)
2023–2024	→ Vendsyssel (loan)	3	(0)
2024	→ FA 2000 (loan)	14	(1)
2025–	Aarhus Fremad	11	(0)
- * Club domestic league appearances and goals as of 2 June 2026

Baptiste Jean Rolland (born 14 January 2003) is a French footballer who plays as a centre-back for Danish 1st Division club Aarhus Fremad.

== Club career ==
=== Youth years ===
Rolland is a product of Lille OSC, which he joined at the age of eight. He spent 10 years at the club's academy before and later also at the clubs reserve team, before leaving the club by mutual agreement in September 2022. After leaving, Rolland stayed in training at Iris Club de Croix.

=== Lyngby BK ===
After just under four months without a club, Rolland signed with Danish Superliga club Lyngby Boldklub on 3 January 2023, where he was given a contract until June 2025, after having been on trial at the club in the month leading up to it. In his first half-season in Lyngby, Rolland made just four appearances; two for the club's U-19 team and two for the club's reserve team.

In search of more playing time, Rolland was loaned out to Danish 1st Division club Vendsyssel FF on 22 August 2023. However, it was a very disappointing stay, with only three performances for Rolland, which is why the loan spell was terminated early, on 1 February 2024. Later that day Rolland was presented to Danish 2nd Division club FA 2000 for the rest of the season.

Ahead of the 2024–25 season, Rolland was once again back in Lyngby. He made his official debut for the club on 26 August 2024, in a league match against Viborg FF.

=== Aarhus Fremad ===
On transfer deadline day, 1 September 2025, Rolland transferred to newly promoted Danish 1st Division club Aarhus Fremad on a deal until June 2027.
