= Tobias Haahr =

Danish footballer (born 2003)

Tobias Haahr Jacobsen
Personal information
- Full name: Tobias Haahr Jacobsen
- Date of birth: 3 July 2003 (age 23)
- Place of birth: Vejle, Denmark
- Height: 1.91 m (6 ft 3 in)
- Position: Goalkeeper

Team information
- Current team: Middelfart
- Number: 1

Youth career
- Vinding SF
- –2017: Vejle
- 2017–2019: OB
- 2019–2023: Vejle

Senior career*
Years	Team	Apps	(Gls)
2023–2026	Vejle	6	(0)
2024	→ Aarhus Fremad (loan)	4	(0)
2026–	Middelfart	10	(0)

International career
2021–2022	Denmark U19	6	(0)
- * Club domestic league appearances and goals as of 20:35, 3 October 2026 (UTC)

Tobias Haahr Jacobsen (born 3 July 2003) is a Danish professional footballer who plays as a goalkeeper for Danish 2nd Division club Middelfart.

== Career ==
=== Vejle Boldklub ===
Haahr started his football career at Vinding SF and later transferred to the partner club Vejle Boldklub. In 2017, he had a stint at Odense Boldklub before returning to Vejle Boldklub ahead of the 2019–20 season. In November 2020, he signed his first contract with Vejle.

In the summer of 2021, ahead of the 2021–22 season, 18-year-old Haahr was permanently promoted to the first-team squad and extended his contract until June 2023. He did, however, continue to primarily play for the club's U-19 squad. He didn't make his official debut for Vejle until May 27, 2023, when he was in the starting lineup for a Danish 1st Division match against FC Helsingør. One month after his debut, Haahr extended his contract until June 2026.

In January 2024, Haahr moved on loan to Danish 2nd Division club Aarhus Fremad for the remainder of the season. However, it only resulted in four matches in the third tier before he returned to Vejle.

On 24 May 2025, when Vejle had secured survival in the 2024–25 Danish Superliga, Haahr made his official debut in the top Danish league, the Danish Superliga, when he was in the starting lineup for the final match of the season against Sønderjyske.

On 22 February 2026, he signed a contract with Middelfart Boldklub from 1st July 2026.

== Honours ==
Vejle

- Danish 1st Division: 2022–23
