= Alberto Vogtmann =

Danish footballer (born 2006)

Personal information
- Full name: Alberto Vogtmann
- Date of birth: 10 March 2006 (age 20)
- Place of birth: Vejle, Denmark
- Height: 1.79 m (5 ft 10 in)
- Position: Left-back

Team information
- Current team: Middelfart
- Number: 77

Youth career
- Hover IF
- Bredballe IF
- Jelling FS
- –2022: Vejle
- 2022–2024: Kolding
- 2024–2025: Sønderjyske

Senior career*
| Years | Team | Apps | (Gls) |
| 2025–2026 | Sønderjyske | 2 | (0) |
| 2026 | → Roskilde (loan) | 11 | (0) |
| 2026– | Middelfart | 10 | (0) |
- * Club domestic league appearances and goals as of 20:35, 3 October 2026 (UTC)

Alberto Vogtmann (born 10 March 2006) is a Danish footballer who plays as a left-back for Danish 2nd Division club Middelfart.

== Career ==
=== Club career ===
In his early youth, Vogtmann played for several clubs in the Vejle area, namely Hover IF, Bredballe IF, and Jelling FS, before he later in his youth career transferred to Vejle Boldklub. Later, Vogtmann transferred to Kolding IF where he stayed for two seasons, before moving to Sønderjyske's U19 team ahead of the 2024–25 season.

Vogtmann performed so well on both the U19 team and the club's reserve team that on May 8, 2025, he signed a one-year contract and was simultaneously promoted to the first-team squad permanently from the 2025–26 season.

Just 10 days later, on May 18, 2025, Vogtmann was called up to the first-team squad for the first time ahead of a Danish Superliga match against Lyngby Boldklub. He made his official debut in the same match when he came on in the 88th minute to replace Marc Dal Hende.

On 3 February 2026, Danish 2nd Division club FC Roskilde loaned 19-year-old Vogtmann from Sønderjyske for the remainder of the season.
