= Andreas Gülstorff =

Danish footballer (born 2003)

Personal information
- Full name: Andreas Gülstorff Pedersen
- Date of birth: 26 January 2003 (age 23)
- Place of birth: Copenhagen, Denmark
- Height: 1.81 m (5 ft 11 in)
- Position: Goalkeeper

Team information
- Current team: Fredericia
- Number: 31

Youth career
- Nordsjælland

Senior career*
Years	Team	Apps	(Gls)
2020–2025	Nordsjælland	1	(0)
2024	→ Aalesunds (loan)	1	(0)
2025	Jerv	20	(0)
2026–	Fredericia	0	(0)

International career
2018–2019	Denmark U16	5	(2)
2019–2020	Denmark U17	7	(0)
2020	Denmark U18	1	(0)
2021–2022	Denmark U19	6	(0)
- * Club domestic league appearances and goals as of 09:17, 4 November 2026 (UTC)

Andreas Gülstorff Pedersen (born 26 January 2003) is a Danish footballer who plays as a goalkeeper for Danish 1st Division club Fredericia.

== Club career ==
=== Nordsjælland ===
Gülstorff is a product of FC Nordsjælland. In August 2020, 17-year-old Gülstorff was brought into the first team squad permanently.

However, he did not make his official debut before Nordsjælland until August 2022, where he was involved from the start in a Danish Cup match against BK Frem.

Gülstorff did not make his Danish Superliga debut until 3 December 2023, when he had to step in as third goalkeeper, as both the first and second goalkeepers were unavailable. He was therefore given the chance from the start against OB, a match that ended 1–1.

==== Loan to Aalesunds ====
On 1 September 2024 it was confirmed that Gülstorff had been loaned to Norwegian Norwegian First Division club Aalesunds for the rest of the year, with an option to buy. Gülstorff was injured during his stay, so he only managed to play one game for the club before returning to Nordsjælland at the end of the year.

=== Jerv ===
On 8 January 2025, it was confirmed that Gülstorff returned to Norway when he signed a 1.5-year contract with Norwegian Second Division club FK Jerv.

On 15 January 2026, FK Jerv confirmed that the parties had agreed to terminate the cooperation with immediate effect. Subsequently, he travelled with the Danish Superliga club Sønderjyske to a training camp.

=== Fredericia ===
On 18 June 2026, Gülstorff joined Danish 1st Division club Fredericia.

== Career statistics ==
=== Club ===
As of match played 5 October 2024

Appearances and goals by club, season and competition
Club	Season	League			National cup (Note: Includes Danish Cup, Norwegian Cup)		Continental		Total	
Club	Season	Division	Apps	Goals	Apps	Goals	Apps	Goals	Apps	Goals
Nordsjælland	2020–21	Danish Superliga	0	0	0	0	—		0	0
Nordsjælland	2021–22	Danish Superliga	0	0	0	0	—		0	0
Nordsjælland	2022–23	Danish Superliga	0	0	2	0	—		2	0
Nordsjælland	2023–24	Danish Superliga	1	0	2	0	0	0	3	0
Nordsjælland	2024–25	Danish Superliga	0	0	0	0	—		0	0
Nordsjælland	Total		1	0	4	0	0	0	5	0
Aalesunds (loan)	2024	Norwegian First Division	1	0	0	0	—		1	0
Career total			2	0	4	0	0	0	6	0
