= Hobro IK =

Association football club

- Full name: Hobro Idræts Klub
- Founded: 13 June 1913; 113 years ago
- Ground: DS Arena
- Capacity: 7,500
- Owner: Hobro IK A/S
- Chairman: Thomas Floor
- Head coach: Jens Gjesing
- League: Danish 1st Division
- 2025–26: Danish 1st Division, 9th of 12
- Website: hobroik.dk
Home colours	Away colours

Hobro Idræts Klub (Danish pronunciation: [hoˈpʁoˀ]), commonly referred to as Hobro IK or HIK, is a professional football club based in Hobro, Denmark. The club currently competes in the Danish 1st Division, the second tier of the Danish football league system, and plays its home matches at DS Arena, which has served as its primary ground since 1958. Hobro IK is affiliated with the Jutland Football Association (DBU Jutland).

Founded on 13 June 1913 as Hobro Idrætsforening, the club adopted its present name in the late 1920s following a merger with the newly established Hobro Boldklub. For much of its history, Hobro competed in the lower tiers of Danish football, gradually gaining prominence through youth development and local support. A significant milestone was achieved in 2014, when the club secured promotion to the Danish Superliga for the first time, marking one of the most unexpected ascents in the league's history. Hobro IK claimed the Danish 1st Division title in the 2016–17 season and has since been recognised for its disciplined playing style and overachievement relative to its size and resources.

== History ==
=== Foundation and early years (1913–58) ===
Hobro IK traces its origins to 27 May 1913, when a group of young people in Hobro decided to form a football club. The club was officially established on 13 June 1913, under the name Hobro Idrætsforening. In the late 1920s, following a merger with the newly founded Hobro Boldklub, the club adopted its current name, Hobro Idræts Klub.

Initially, matches were played on a grass field at Vilhelmsminde before relocating to the town's market square. However, visiting teams refused to play on the unsuitable surface, prompting the creation of a proper pitch on Vester Alle—later dubbed the "mud pitch" (mudderbanen). In the early 1930s, the team moved again to a field near Rosendal, which served as Hobro's primary football ground for the next 25 years.

In 1958, the club inaugurated Hobro Stadium at Ledsagers Jorde near Østerskoven. This coincided with the Jutland Football Association's modernisation of league structures, placing Hobro IK's first team in Series I and the reserves in Series II.

=== Cup highlights and challenges (1961–89) ===
A notable early milestone for Hobro IK occurred in 1961, when the club reached the round of 16 in the Danish Cup, hosting B 1909. The visitors, featuring several Danish internationals, won 11–1 in front of 1,912 spectators. Hobro's sole goal was scored by Carl Erik Kristensen, father of future nine-time 24 Hours of Le Mans winner Tom Kristensen.

The club experienced significant challenges in the mid-1970s, falling to Series III and facing severe financial difficulties. Stability was gradually restored through a no-interest loan from the local municipality, the appointment of a new executive board, and the creation of a financial oversight committee.

By the late 1980s, Hobro had returned to the Jutland Series. In 1987, they hosted second-tier Randers Freja in a Danish Cup fixture, drawing a crowd of 2,532. Hobro lost the match 4–1.

=== Path to national success (1999–2010) ===
The foundation for Hobro IK's modern success was laid in 1999, when the club's under-19 side won the national championship in the 1st Division. That team included brothers Lars and Mads Justesen, as well as Peter and Martin Thomsen.

In 2005, Hobro's senior team earned promotion to the third-tier Danish 2nd Division. Players from the youth squad, including the Justesen brothers and Rasmus Ingemann, were joined by sports director Jens Hammer Sørensen.

Hobro finished second in the 2nd Division West in the 2009–10 season, earning a promotion playoff against B.93. The first leg, played at Østerbro Stadium, ended 2–0 in Hobro's favour, with goals from Kasper Fisker and Mark Vestergaard. In the return leg at Hobro Stadium, Anders Syberg and Eno Hald Møller secured a 3–1 win (5–1 aggregate), sending Hobro to the second-tier Danish 1st Division for the first time in club history.

=== Superliga promotion and breakthrough (2010–2015) ===
Following promotion in 2010, Hobro remained in the 1st Division for four seasons. The club narrowly avoided relegation in the 2012–13 campaign but stunned Danish football in 2013–14 by finishing second, just behind Silkeborg, thereby securing a historic promotion to the Danish Superliga. The achievement was considered one of the biggest surprises in the league's history.

Hobro IK's debut season in the 2014–15 Danish Superliga was met with widespread skepticism, with many analysts predicting immediate relegation. Defying expectations, the club opened the campaign with a 2–1 away victory over OB. The strong start continued with a 2–0 win against Brøndby and a 3–0 upset over defending champions FC Copenhagen at Parken Stadium. Hobro ultimately secured a seventh-place finish with 43 points, earning widespread praise for their discipline and competitive spirit.

=== Recent years (2015–present) ===
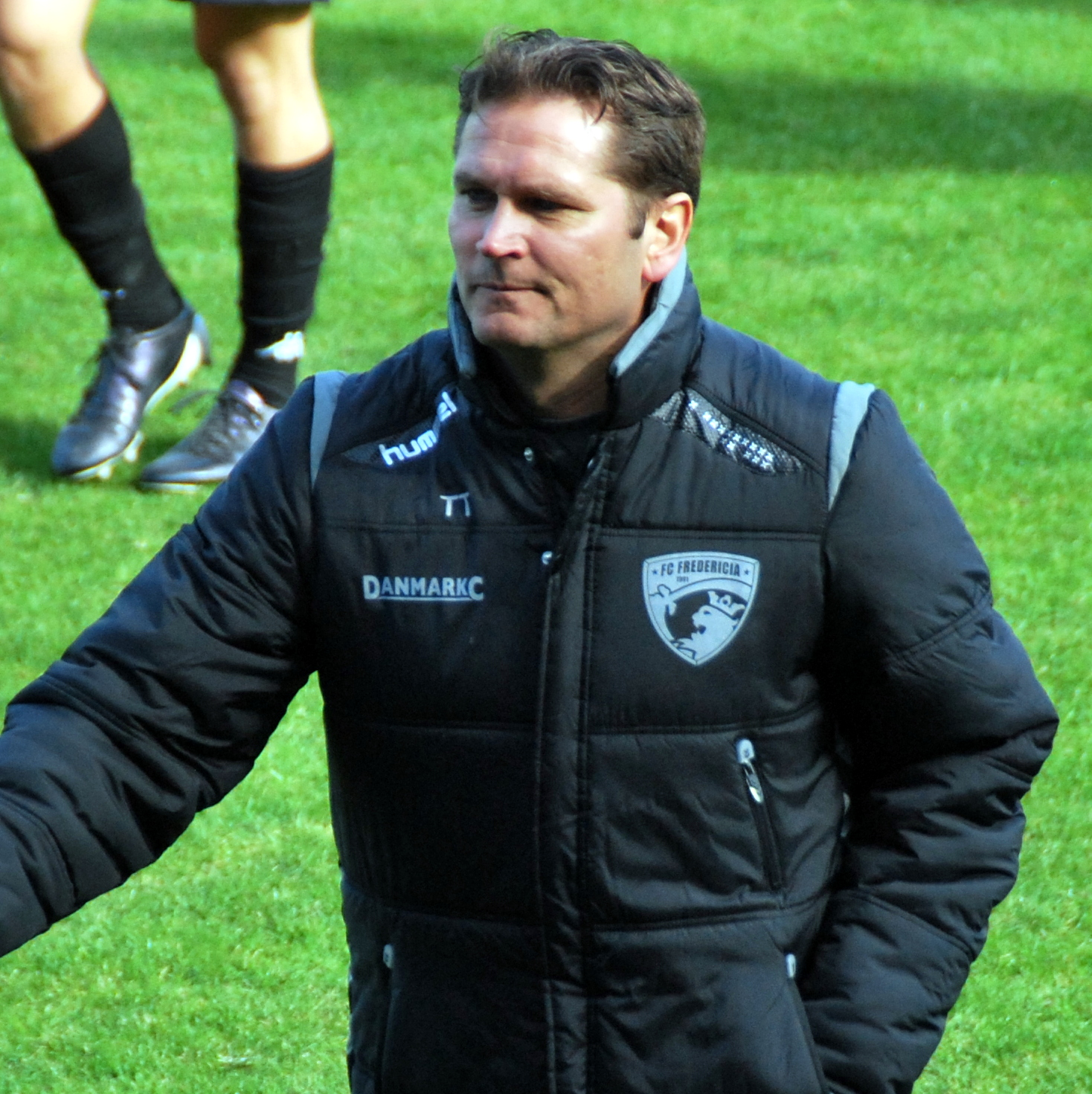
Thomas Thomasberg led the club to promotion, winning the 2017–18 Danish 1st Division title

Following the 2015–16 season, Hobro IK experienced a period of fluctuation between Denmark's top two football divisions. After finishing at the bottom of the Superliga table in 2015–16, the club was relegated to the Danish 1st Division. In November 2015, Hobro had appointed veteran coach Ove Pedersen as head coach in an effort to stabilise the club.

During the 2016–17 season, Thomas Thomasberg was appointed head coach, taking over midway through the campaign. Under Thomasberg's leadership, Hobro secured the 1st Division title and achieved immediate promotion back to the Superliga.

Thomasberg continued as head coach during Hobro's return to the Superliga, maintaining the club's top-flight status until his departure in June 2018 to manage Randers. Assistant coach Allan Kuhn was subsequently promoted to the head coach position.

In early 2019, Peter Sørensen succeeded Kuhn as head coach. Under Sørensen's leadership, Hobro avoided relegation by defeating Vejle 3–0 on aggregate in the May 2019 promotion/relegation play-off. Despite this success, the club struggled in the following season, finishing last in the 2019–20 Superliga with 23 points, and was relegated to the 1st Division. Sørensen continued as head coach in the 1st Division but resigned in February 2021, citing differences with the club's sporting direction. Assistant coach Michael Kryger took over on an interim basis for the remainder of the 2020–21 season.

In June 2021, former club captain Martin Thomsen was appointed head coach on a three-year contract. Since returning to the 1st Division, Hobro has generally posted mid-table finishes. The club has continued to focus on developing young talents from its academy as part of a long-term strategy.

== Players ==
=== Current squad ===
As of 3 September 2026

Note: Flags indicate national team as defined under FIFA eligibility rules; some limited exceptions apply. Players may hold more than one non-FIFA nationality.

No.	Pos.	Nation	Player
1	GK	DEN	Andreas Søndergaard
2	DF	DEN	Mikkel Løndal
3	DF	DEN	Christian Enemark
4	DF	DEN	Oliver Dorph
5	DF	DEN	Mikkel Kannegaard
7	MF	DEN	Oliver Klitten
8	MF	DEN	Mikkel Pedersen
10	FW	DEN	Frederik Christensen
11	MF	NOR	Runar Hauge
12	DF	DEN	Marius Jacobsen
13	DF	DEN	Frederik Dietz
14	MF	DEN	Lukas Falk
16	MF	DEN	Oscar Meedom

No.	Pos.	Nation	Player
17	MF	DEN	Zander Hyltoft
18	DF	DEN	Emil Søgaard
19	MF	DEN	Vedad Halilovic
20	DF	DEN	Anders Noshe
21	FW	DEN	Jonathan Lind
22	FW	DEN	Martin Huldahl
23	FW	DEN	Marco Bruhn
25	GK	DEN	Jonas Dakir
26	MF	DEN	Theo Ekié Hansen
27	DF	DEN	Lukas Klitten
29	MF	NGA	Onyebuchi Obasi
37	FW	DEN	Magnus Rosengreen
78	MF	DEN	Hjalte Dahl

=== Youth players in use 2026-27 ===
Note: Flags indicate national team as defined under FIFA eligibility rules; some limited exceptions apply. Players may hold more than one non-FIFA nationality.

No.	Pos.	Nation	Player

=== Out on loan ===
Note: Flags indicate national team as defined under FIFA eligibility rules; some limited exceptions apply. Players may hold more than one non-FIFA nationality.

No.	Pos.	Nation	Player

== Coaching staff ==
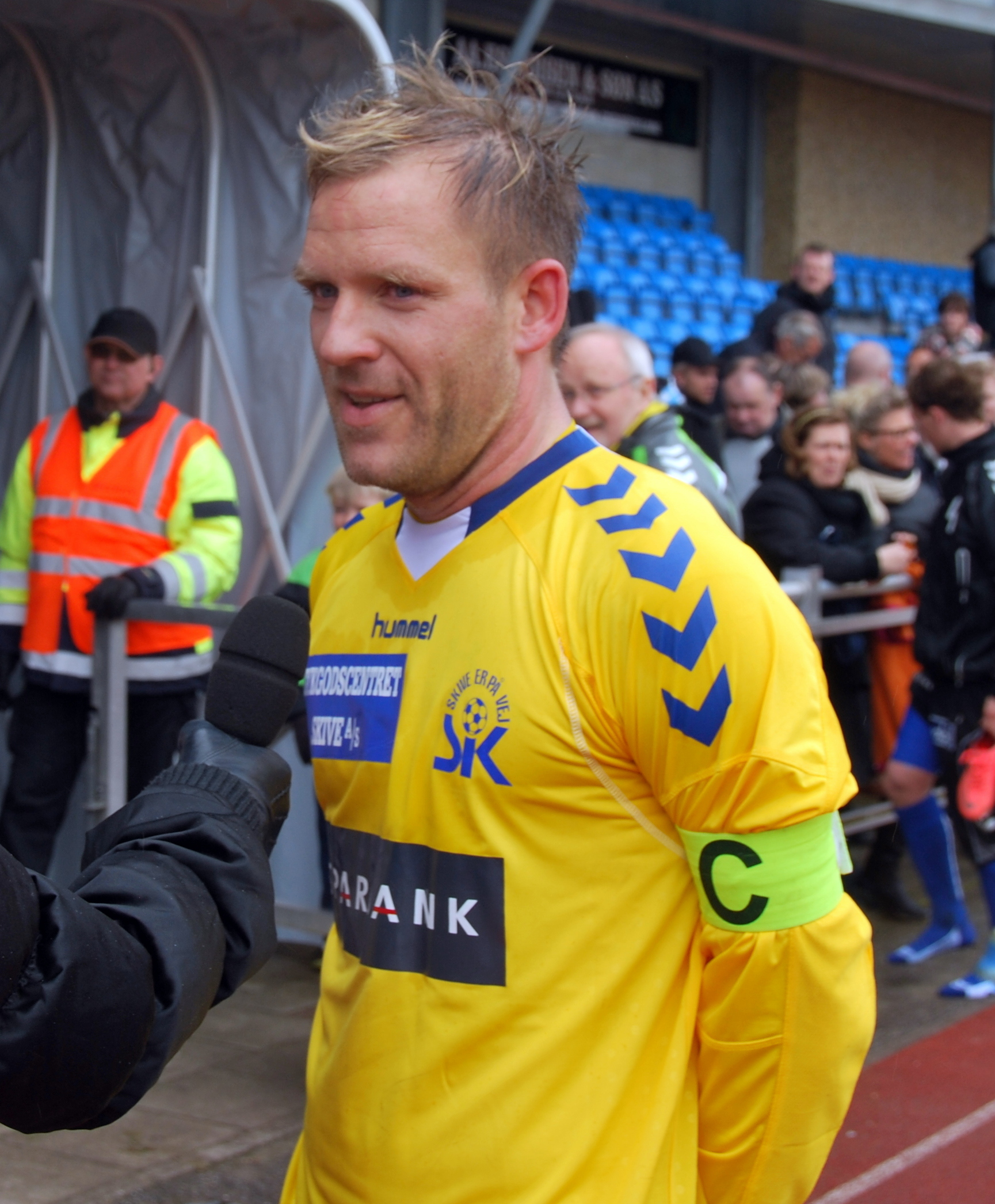
Martin Thomsen served as the club's head coach between 2021 and 2025

Position	Staff
Head coach	(Denmark) Jens Gjesing
Assistant coaches	(Denmark) Emil Antonsen (Denmark) Jakob Hjorth
Goalkeeping coach	(Denmark) Martin S. Jensen
Physiotherapist	(Denmark) Mikkel Poulsen
Fitness coach	(Denmark) Sebastian Dam
Team coordinator	(Denmark) Brian Axelsen

=== List of managers ===
List of Hobro managers since 2002 is shown in the following table:

Information correct as of the match played on 20 August 2025. Only competitive matches are counted. Caretakers are shown in italics.

Manager	Nat.	From	To	G	W	D	L	GF	GA	Win%	Honours
Per Sørensen	(Denmark)	2002	2004	—	—	—	—	—	—	—	–
Jens Hammer Sørensen	(Denmark)	2004	2007	—	—	—	—	—	—	—	–
Søren Kusk	(Denmark)	24 September 2007	31 December 2007	—	—	—	—	—	—	—	–
Calle Facius	(Denmark)	21 January 2008	16 May 2008	—	—	—	—	—	—	—	–
Søren Kusk	(Denmark)	1 July 2008	30 June 2010	67	36	15	16	141	100	53.73	–
Jan Østergaard	(Denmark)	1 July 2010	2 November 2010	13	4	3	6	21	25	30.77	–
Jens Hammer Sørensen	(Denmark)	2 November 2010	31 December 2010	2	1	0	1	2	3	50.00	–
Jakob Michelsen	(Denmark)	8 January 2011	30 June 2012	41	11	15	15	55	62	26.83	–
Klavs Rasmussen	(Denmark)	11 July 2012	17 January 2013	19	4	8	7	17	25	21.05	–
Jonas Dal	(Denmark)	22 January 2013	20 October 2015	97	39	20	38	140	139	40.21	–
Lars Justesen	(Denmark)	21 October 2015	24 November 2015	4	1	1	2	7	12	25.00	–
Ove Pedersen	(Denmark)	25 November 2015	28 November 2016	38	12	7	19	44	59	31.58	–
Thomas Thomasberg	(Denmark)	4 January 2017	30 June 2018	52	24	11	17	79	60	46.15	1 Danish 1st Division title
Allan Kuhn	(Denmark)	7 June 2018	21 February 2019	25	6	5	14	23	45	24.00	–
Peter Sørensen	(Denmark)	21 February 2019	26 February 2021	70	17	25	28	93	108	24.29	–
Michael Kryger	(Denmark)	26 February 2020	30 June 2021	13	2	5	6	10	17	15.38	–
Martin Thomsen	(Denmark)	1 July 2021	28 July 2025	139	47	38	54	183	199	33.81	–
Jakob Hjorth	(Denmark)	28 July 2025	11 August 2025	3	1	1	1	6	7	33.33	–
Jens Gjesing	(Denmark)	11 August 2025	Present	2	1	0	1	2	1	50.00	–

== Honours ==
Hobro IK honours
Honour	No.	Years
Danish 1st Division	1	2016–17

== Statistics and records ==
Defender Mads Justesen holds the record for Hobro appearances, having played 340 matches in all competitions between 2004 and 2018. Pål Alexander Kirkevold is the club's all-time leading league goalscorer in its professional era, having scored a total of 43 goals between 2015 and 2021. He also became the top goalscorer of the 2017–18 Danish Superliga, a season in which he was also voted Player of the Season of Hobro IK. The highest transfer fee received by the club is reported to be €1.2 million for Richmond Gyamfi, paid by AGF in 2024.

The club's record home attendance is 6,596, for a Danish Superliga match against AaB on 16 March 2015. The team's biggest ever professional win was a 7–0 away defeat of Lyseng in the Danish Cup in September 2020.
