= Tommy Schram =

Danish footballer (born 1971)

Personal information
- Date of birth: 9 November 1971 (age 54)
- Place of birth: Denmark
- Position: Midfielder

Senior career*
Years	Team	Apps	(Gls)
199x-1995	Brøndby IF	45	(7)
1995-2001	Herfølge Boldklub	159	(13)
2001	Íþróttabandalag Vestmannaeyja	10	(0)
2001	Yeovil Town F.C.	4	(0)
2002-2004	Vejle Boldklub	44	(2)
- * Club domestic league appearances and goals

Tommy Schram (born 9 November 1971 in Denmark) is a Danish retired footballer who now works as a salesman at Ljungdahl in his home country.

== Career ==
Schram started his senior career with Brøndby IF, where he made fifty-nine appearances and scored twelve goals. After that, he played for Danish club Herfølge Boldklub, Icelandic club Íþróttabandalag Vestmannaeyja, English club Yeovil Town, and Danish club Vejle Boldklub before retiring in 2004.
