= Magnus Munck =

Danish footballer (born 2005)

Personal information
- Full name: Magnus Munck Bjørnholm
- Date of birth: 5 January 2005 (age 21)
- Place of birth: Copenhagen, Denmark
- Height: 1.73 m (5 ft 8 in)
- Position: Midfielder

Team information
- Current team: Vendsyssel
- Number: 47

Youth career
- B.93
- Nordsjælland

Senior career*
Years	Team	Apps	(Gls)
2023–2025	Nordsjælland	1	(0)
2024	→ RSCA Futures (loan)	4	(0)
2025–	Vendsyssel	33	(7)

International career
2020–2021	Denmark U-16	4	(0)
2021–2022	Denmark U-17	14	(3)
2022–2023	Denmark U-18	4	(1)
2023–2024	Denmark U-19	2	(0)
- * Club domestic league appearances and goals as of 18 June 2026

Magnus Munck Bjørnholm (born 5 January 2005) is a Danish footballer who plays as a midfielder for Danish 2nd Division side Vendsyssel FF.

== Club career ==
=== FC Nordsjælland ===
Munck joined FC Nordsjælland as a 12-year-old from B.93. He worked his way up through the club's youth academy, and on 31 August 2022, 17-year-old Munck made his official debut for Nordsjælland when he was substituted in a Danish Cup match against BK Frem.

Munck made another appearance in a Danish Cup match in October 2022, before he started training regularly with the first team around the turn of 2023. As a result, after sitting on the bench in a Danish Superliga match in early April 2023, he was promoted permanently to the club's first team later that month. On 19 May 2023, Munck signed a new contract until June 2027. Ten days later, on 29 May 2023, he made his debut in the Danish Superliga when he came on for the last few minutes against Brøndby IF.

In the 2023–24 season, Munck didn't get any first team appearances, playing primarily for the club's U-19 team.

==== Loan to RSCA Futures ====
On 2 August 2024, it was confirmed that Munck moved to RSCA Futures, the reserve team of Belgian club Anderlecht, on loan from FC Nordsjælland, for one year with an option to buy. The team played in the Belgian Challenger Pro League, the second-highest division in Belgium.

Munck made his debut on 24 August 2024, when he came on for the final few minutes against Patro Eisden. On 15 November 2024, it was confirmed that Munck's tenancy had been terminated and the player returned to Nordsjælland.

=== Vendsyssel FF ===
On 21 January 2025 it was confirmed that Munck moved to Danish 1st Division side Vendsyssel FF on a deal until June 2027.

== Career statistics ==
As of match played 20 September 2024

Club	Season	League			National cup		Europe		Other		Total	
Club	Season	Division	Apps	Goals	Apps	Goals	Apps	Goals	Apps	Goals	Apps	Goals
Nordsjælland	2022–23	Danish Superliga	1	0	3	0	—		—		4	0
Nordsjælland	2023–24	Danish Superliga	0	0	0	0	0	0	0	0	0	0
Nordsjælland	2024–25	Danish Superliga	0	0	0	0	0	0	0	0	0	0
Nordsjælland	Total		1	0	3	0	0	0	0	0	4	0
RSCA Futures (loan)	2024–25	Challenger Pro League	4	0	—		—		—		4	0
Career total			5	0	3	0	0	0	0	0	8	0
