= Adam Vendelbo =

Danish footballer

Personal information
- Full name: Adam Vendelbo Clement
- Date of birth: 20 February 2003 (age 23)
- Place of birth: Virum, Denmark
- Height: 1.87 m (6 ft 2 in)
- Position: Winger

Team information
- Current team: Vendsyssel (on loan from Lyngby)
- Number: 12

Youth career
- Virum-Sorgenfri
- Lyngby

Senior career*
Years	Team	Apps	(Gls)
2021–	Lyngby	2	(0)
2023–2024	→ Nykøbing (loan)	27	(3)
2025–	→ Vendsyssel (loan)	30	(5)
- * Club domestic league appearances and goals as of 18 June 2026

Adam Vendelbo Clement (born 20 February 2003 is a Danish footballer who plays as a winger for Danish 2nd Division side Vendsyssel FF, on loan from Lyngby Boldklub.

== Club career ==
=== Lyngby ===
Vendelbo began his football career at Virum-Sorgenfri Boldklub at the age of six, before joining Lyngby Boldklub as a U13 player. There, he progressed through the club's academy and made his official debut for Lyngby’s first team in August 2021, coming on as a substitute in a 9–0 Danish Cup win over Østerbro IF.

After making his first-team debut, Vendelbo continued to play for the club's U-19 side but regularly trained with the senior squad. In April 2023, he signed a new contract with Lyngby, extending his stay until June 2025.

In July 2023, 20-year-old Vendelbo was loaned out to Nykøbing FC of the Danish 2nd Division for the 2023–24 season in pursuit of more senior experience. Vendelbo made 30 appearances for Nykøbing, scoring three goals, before returning to Lyngby in the summer of 2024.

On 12 February 2025, Vendelbo extended his contract until June 2027, and just four days later, he made his official Danish Superliga debut, coming on as a substitute for Jesper Cornelius in the match against FC Midtjylland.

On 6 August 2025, Vendelbo joined newly relegated Danish 2nd Division side Vendsyssel FF on a one-year loan deal.
