= Martin Thomsen (footballer, born 1982) =

Danish footballer (born 1982)

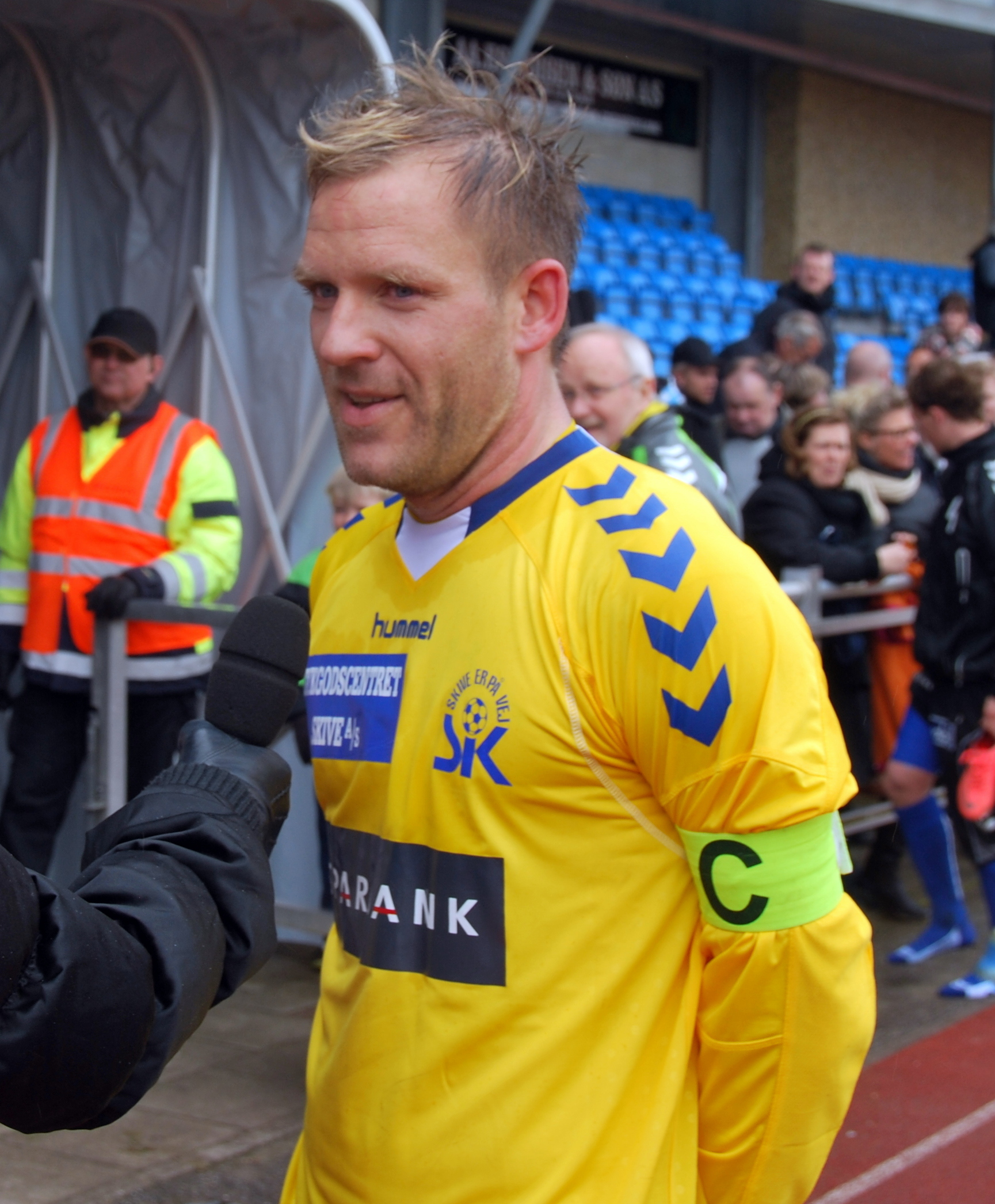
- Thomsen in 2012

Personal information
- Full name: Martin Thomsen
- Date of birth: 6 August 1982 (age 44)
- Place of birth: Hobro, Denmark
- Height: 1.83 m (6 ft 0 in)
- Position: Midfielder

Team information
- Current team: Viborg (assistant)

Youth career
- Valsgård IF 83
- Hobro

Senior career*
Years	Team	Apps	(Gls)
–2001	Hobro		
2001–2004	Viborg	1	(0)
2003–2004	→ Skive (loan)	?	(?)
2004–2013	Skive	225	(21)
2013–2015	Hobro	76	(16)
2015–2016	Silkeborg	37	(8)
2017	Jammerbugt	13	(4)
2017–2018	Skive	18	(3)

Managerial career
- 2017: Jammerbugt (player-assistant)
- 2017–2018: Skive (player-assistant)
- 2018–2020: Skive (assistant)
- 2020–2021: Skive
- 2021–2025: Hobro
- 2025–: Viborg (assistant)
- * Club domestic league appearances and goals

Martin Thomsen (born 6 August 1982) is a Danish professional football manager and former player. He is currently the assistant coach of Viborg FF.

== Playing career ==
Thomsen started his career playing for Valsgård IF 83, before joining his hometown side Hobro IK. Viborg FF quickly caught notion of the midfielder, and he signed a three-year contract at the Superliga team. Thomsen only played nine minutes altogether in the Superliga, as a substitute against F.C. Copenhagen on 21 July 2001. In the summer of 2003 he was loaned to Skive IK on a one-year basis. Viborg terminated Thomsen's contract after his loan spell at Skive.

Thomsen signed with Skive IK on a permanent basis in 2004. He would stay at the club until 2013. In 2011, Thomsen scored 12 goals in the Danish second division, which was a decisive factor in Skive's surprising fourth place in the league. He was therefore awarded the Most Valuable Player award, ahead of players like Simon Makienok, Peter Graulund and Stephan Petersen.

On the last day of the transfer window on 31 January 2013, Thomsen moved from Skive IK to his former club Hobro IK, who bought him free from his contract. He experienced promotion to the Danish Superliga during his first season back at the club. In the 2014–15 season, Thomsen played all 33 matches with six goals and two assists as a result. On 28 May 2015, it was announced that Silkeborg IF had signed Thomsen on a free transfer, with him signing a two-year contract. It was announced on 16 December 2016 that Silkeborg and Thomsen had agreed to terminate the agreement. In January 2017, it was announced that he was taking up a position as player-assistant at Jammerbugt FC for a period of six months.

In the summer of 2017, Thomsen returned to Skive IK, where he also played from 2004 to 2013. There, he signed a two-year contract, where he was to both act as a player and be part of the coaching team.

== Managerial career ==
Thomsen announced his retirement as a player in August 2018, and was instead appointed as the assistant coach to Thomas Røll at Skive. He signed a two-year contract extension as assistant coach for the club on 3 May 2019. Røll and Thomsen became a head coaching duo in July 2019, as the club wanted to use his talent in discovering and developing talents in the first team.

Thomsen became the only head coach of Skive on 18 July 2020, as the club could not afford to pay two head coaches. As a result, Røll was dismissed.

In June 2021, Thomsen left Skive and was announced as the new manager of Hobro IK. After four years, Thomsen announced his departure on 28 July 2025, as he had been sold to Danish Superliga club Viborg FF, where he had been appointed assistant coach under new head coach Nickolai Lund.
