= Abdul Hakim Sulemana =

Ghanaian footballer (born 2005)

Personal information
- Full name: Abdul Hakim Sulemana
- Date of birth: 19 February 2005 (age 21)
- Place of birth: Techiman, Ghana
- Height: 1.64 m (5 ft 5 in)
- Position: Left winger

Youth career
- –2023: Right to Dream
- 2023–2024: Lyon
- 2024–: Randers

Senior career*
Years	Team	Apps	(Gls)
2024–	Randers	9	(0)
2025–2026	→ Hillerød (loan)	8	(0)

International career
2024–	Ghana U20	4	(0)
- * Club domestic league appearances and goals as of 30 May 2026

Abdul Hakim Sulemana (born 19 February 2005) is a Ghanaian professional footballer who plays as a left winger for Randers FC.

== Club career ==
A product of Right to Dream Academy, Sulemana moved abroad at a young age, joining Olympique Lyon in 2023, where he was a part of the clubs academy.

Despite interest from several foreign clubs, it was confirmed at the end of July 2024 that Sulemana had joined Danish Superliga club Randers FC on a deal until June 2026. Sulemana later stated that Randers' assistant coach Fatah Abdirahman had played a key role in the transfer, as the two knew each other from their time together at the Right to Dream Academy.

Sulemana made his debut for Randers on August 25, 2024, in a Danish Superliga game against Brøndby IF, replacing Simen Nordli after 84 minutes.

On 1st September 2025, Sulemana was loaned out to Danish 1st Division side Hillerød Fodbold for the rest of the season.

== International career ==
In March 2024, Sulemana was a part of Ghana's U20 squad for the Football at the 2023 African Games event. He played four games for the team, contributing to their gold medal victory.

== Personal life ==
Abdul Hakim Sulemana is the younger brother of Atalanta player Kamaldeen Sulemana. Their older brother, Abdul-Rauf Sulemana, also plays football and, like his two younger brothers, has also played football in Denmark.

Sulemana's father is Gonja and his mother is Dagomba. He is a Muslim.
