= Frederik Mortensen (footballer) =

Danish footballer (born 1998)

Personal information
- Date of birth: 30 October 1998 (age 28)
- Place of birth: Dronninglund, Denmark
- Height: 1.76 m (5 ft 9 in)
- Position: Midfielder

Team information
- Current team: Vendsyssel
- Number: 14

Youth career
- Hjørring
- Viborg

Senior career*
Years	Team	Apps	(Gls)
2016–2018	Viborg	1	(0)
2018–2019	Horsens	1	(0)
2019–2021	Skive	48	(0)
2021–2026	Hobro	78	(3)
2026–	Vendsyssel	2	(0)
- * Club domestic league appearances and goals as of 7 September 2026

Frederik Mortensen (born 30 October 1998) is a Danish professional footballer who plays as a midfielder for Danish 1st Division club Vendsyssel.

== Career ==
=== Viborg FF ===
Mortensen joined Viborg FF from Hjørring IF as a U17 player. On 25 April 2017 the club announced, that Mortensen had been promoted permanently into the first team squad.

=== AC Horsens ===
On 7 June 2018 AC Horsens announced, that Mortensen had joined the club on a 2-year contract. A month after his arrival, Mortensen was not able to play due to infectious mononucleosis and was out indefinitely.

On 27 June 2019 his contract was terminated by mutual consent after playing only two games for the club.

=== Skive IK ===
Skive IK announced on 4 July 2019, that Mortensen had joined the club on a 1-year contract.

=== Hobro IK ===
On 16 June 2021, after two season in Skive, Mortensen signed a three-year deal with Hobro IK. On 28 September 2023, Hobro IK and Mortensen extended the contract until the summer of 2026.

=== Vendsyssel ===
On 5 August 2026, Mortensen signed a one-year contract with Vendsyssel FF.
