= Mohamad Al-Naser =

Jordanian footballer born in 1997

Personal information
- Full name: Mohamad Fakhri Al-Naser
- Date of birth: 23 March 1997 (age 29)
- Place of birth: Zarqa, Jordan
- Height: 1.84 m (6 ft 0 in)
- Position: Winger

Team information
- Current team: HB Køge
- Number: 11

Youth career
- –2016: BK Frem

Senior career*
Years	Team	Apps	(Gls)
2016–2018	BK Frem		
2018–2021	Vanløse IF	56	(12)
2021	Hellerup IK	12	(5)
2021–2023	Hvidovre IF	48	(9)
2023	Al-Mesaimeer	8	(1)
2023–2024	Burgan		
2024–	HB Køge	49	(8)
- * Club domestic league appearances and goals as of 2 June 2026

Mohamad Fakhri Al-Naser (Arabic: محمد فخري النصر; born 23 March 1997), nicknamed Mudi (Arabic: مودي), is a Jordanian footballer who plays as a winger for Danish 1st Division side HB Køge and the Jordan national team.

== Club career ==
=== Al-Mesaimeer ===
Al-Naser was noted for having played in the Qatari Second Division with Al-Mesaimeer.

=== HB Køge ===
On 30 August 2024, Al-Naser signed a two-year contract with Danish 1st Division club HB Køge, after spending a year and a half in the Middle East.

== International career ==
Al-Naser received his first call-up to the Jordan national football team on 10 January 2025, for a set of training camps in Amman and Doha.

On 8 March 2025, Al-Naser received another call up to the Jordan national football team for the 2026 FIFA World Cup qualification matches against Palestine and South Korea.

== Playing style ==
Al-Naser is described as a player with speed, who can both set up and score goals with direct play.
