= Anders Noshe =

Danish footballer (born 2006)

Personal information
- Full name: Anders Abdull-Gaffar Haidar Noshe
- Date of birth: 9 January 2006 (age 20)
- Place of birth: Aalborg, Denmark
- Position: Right winger

Youth career
- B52
- Gug Boldklub
- Aalborg Chang
- AaB

Senior career*
Years	Team	Apps	(Gls)
2022–2026	AaB	3	(0)

International career
2021	Denmark U16	2	(1)
2022–2023	Denmark U17	12	(2)
- * Club domestic league appearances and goals as of 19:58, 26 May 2022 (UTC)

Anders Abdull-Gaffar Haidar Noshe (born 9 January 2006) is a Danish professional footballer who plays as a right winger.

== Career ==
=== AaB ===
Raised in Gug, a district in the south of Aalborg, Noshe began his career at Gug Boldklub, before joining Aalborg Chang and later AaB.

Already in November 2021, 15-year old Noshe began training with AaB's Danish Superliga team. In February 2022, Noshe was called up for his first ever professional game. On 20 March 2022, Noshe became the youngest (16 years & 70 days) debutant ever in the Danish Superliga for AaB, when he came on from the bench in the 87th minute against Brøndby IF. On 22 June 2022 AaB confirmed, that Noshe had signed a contract extension until the end of 2024.

In August 2023, Noshe again signed a new contract, this time until June 2026. Noshe didn't play many games in the 2023–24 season as he struggled with a lot of injuries. Around the end of October 2024, just as Noshe had started to play a bit more for the club's U-19 team, he suffered a serious torn ACL injury.
