= Vendsyssel FF =

Association football club in Hjørring, Denmark

- Full name: Vendsyssel Forenede Fodboldklubber
- Short name: VFF
- Founded: 1886; 140 years ago (as Hjørring Gymnastikforening); Newest reformation in 2013; 13 years ago (as Vendsyssel FF)
- Ground: Nord Energi Arena, Hjørring
- Capacity: 7,500
- Owner: FC Hjørrings venner ApS
- Chairman: Henrik Sørensen
- Manager: Kim Engstrøm
- League: 2nd Division
- 2024–25: 1st Division, 11th of 12 (relegated)
- Website: www.vendsysselff.dk
Home colours	Away colours	Third colours

Vendsyssel Forenede Fodboldklubber is a professional football club based in Hjørring, Denmark. The team competes in the Danish 1st Division, the second tier of the Danish football league system. The club plays home matches at Nord Energi Arena, which has a capacity of 7,500. The club is playing on a license from Hjørring IF, which used to belong to FC Hjørring. The club is a cooperation between Hjørring IF and Frederikshavn fI.

== History ==
The roots of Vendsyssel FF can be traced to 9 November 1886, where Hjørring Gymnastikforening was founded. After multiple mergers, the club was named Hjørring IF in 1921. The club's existence has been marked by relative anonymity, bouncing between the lower divisions of the Danish football pyramid. Renamed FC Hjørring in 2006, the club, however, soon found success, secured promotion in their 2009–10 Danish 2nd Divisions campaign. This meant their first promotion to the Danish 1st Division, the second tier in the Danish football league system.

In May 2013, the Danish Football Association announced that FC Hjørring's licence would be revoked due to poor economy, resulting in a relegation to the Danish 2nd Divisions. FC Hjørring appealed the decision, which was successful, as the Danish Football Association assessed that the financial situation had improved sufficiently in order to renew the licence for the 2010-11 Danish 1st Division.

On 24 June 2013, FC Hjørring announced a merger with Frederikshavn fI, which would subsequently change the name of the club to Vendsyssel FF. On 3 March 2014, Frederikshavn fI officially announced that they would step out of the merger on the senior level, but that they intended to continue a partnership with Vendsyssel FF on the youth level.

In the summer of 2018 the club earned its first promotion to the highest tier in Danish football by beating Lyngby BK in two games in the Superliga playoffs, after losing in the playoffs the year before to AC Horsens. They only lasted one season in the Superliga, however, as they were relegated the following season.

On the 1st December 2024, Vendsyssel FF got a new ownership group consisting of 20 people. Among them were Colombian rapper Blessd and Danish national team player Joachim Andersen. Former owner Jacob Andersen still owns 15 percent of the ownership in the club.

On May 16, 2025, Vendsyssel FF was relegated to the Danish 2nd Division.

In November 2025, Vendsyssel FF was taken over by a new group of local investors organized through the company FC Hjørrings Venner ApS. The takeover marked the end of a brief period of foreign ownership, during which the club had been controlled by an international investor group that included the Colombian artist Blessd. The new ownership group consists of several North Jutland business figures, including Henrik Fjordbak, Henrik Stoksted Sørensen, and Morten Simonsen. The purpose of the takeover was to ensure stronger local anchoring, financial stability, and a long-term strategic development of the club, both on and off the pitch. The takeover followed a period characterized by financial challenges, sporting decline, and organizational uncertainty. With the new owners, plans were introduced to reorganize the club and increase the focus on youth development and local support.

== Stadium ==
Vendsyssel FF's Nord Energi Arena, more popularly known as Hjørring Stadion, was opened in 1930 and went through renovations in 2014. Besides being the home ground for Vendsyssel FF, it also functions as home ground for nine-time Danish women's football league winners, Fortuna Hjørring.

== Players ==
=== Current squad ===
As of 3 September 2026

Note: Flags indicate national team as defined under FIFA eligibility rules; some limited exceptions apply. Players may hold more than one non-FIFA nationality.

No.	Pos.	Nation	Player
1	GK	FIN	Lasse Schulz
4	DF	SWE	Bilal Konteh (on loan from FC Midtjylland)
6	MF	NGR	Stephen Michael
8	MF	FIN	Rasmus Schüller
9	DF	DEN	Lasse Steffensen
10	FW	CAN	Steven Simpson
11	MF	DEN	Marcus Hannesbo
12	FW	DEN	Adam Vendelbo
13	GK	DEN	Anton Hvidberg
14	MF	DEN	Frederik Mortensen
15	MF	NOR	Harald Nilsen Tangen (on loan from Sarpsborg)
16	GK	DEN	Magnus Worsøe
17	MF	DEN	Sebastian Lodberg

No.	Pos.	Nation	Player
18	MF	DEN	Malthe Holt
19	FW	NOR	Emil Grønn Pedersen
20	DF	DEN	Mathias Werther
21	DF	DEN	Benjamin Clemmensen
22	FW	NGR	Precious Williams
23	DF	FRO	Ari Olsen
27	DF	DEN	Jeppe Sommer
30	MF	FRO	Árni Atlason
31	MF	DEN	Andreas Rise
32	DF	DEN	Kasper Kjellingbro
37	DF	DEN	Mads Houkjær
73	DF	DEN	Mads Nybo

=== Youth players in use 2026–27 ===
Note: Flags indicate national team as defined under FIFA eligibility rules; some limited exceptions apply. Players may hold more than one non-FIFA nationality.

No.	Pos.	Nation	Player

=== Out on loan ===
Note: Flags indicate national team as defined under FIFA eligibility rules; some limited exceptions apply. Players may hold more than one non-FIFA nationality.

No.	Pos.	Nation	Player
