= 2020–21 Randers FC season =

Randers
2020–21 season
- Chairman: Per Hastrup
- Manager: Thomas Thomasberg
- Stadium: Randers Stadium
- Danish Superliga: 6th
- Danish Cup: Winners
- Top goalscorer: League: Alhaji Kamara (9 goals); All: Alhaji Kamara (10 goals)
Home colours	Away colours

The 2020–21 Randers FC season is the club's eighth consecutive campaign in the Danish Superliga, the top division of football in the country.

In addition to the domestic league, the club also competed in this season's edition of the Danish Cup. On 13 May 2021, Randers defeated SønderjyskE 4–0 in the Danish Cup final, winning just their second ever trophy in Danish football.

== Players ==
As of 7 March 2021

Note: Flags indicate national team as defined under FIFA eligibility rules; some limited exceptions apply. Players may hold more than one non-FIFA nationality.

No.	Pos.	Nation	Player
1	GK	SWE	Patrik Carlgren
2	DF	DEN	Simon Graves Jensen
5	DF	DEN	Mathias Nielsen
7	MF	DEN	Mikkel Kallesøe
8	MF	AUT	Simon Piesinger
10	MF	NGR	Tosin Kehinde
11	DF	DEN	Erik Marxen (captain)
14	MF	DEN	Frederik Lauenborg
15	DF	GER	Björn Kopplin
16	MF	NOR	Lasse Berg Johnsen
17	DF	DEN	Jesper Lauridsen
18	FW	DEN	Tobias Klysner

No.	Pos.	Nation	Player
19	MF	DEN	Oliver Bundgaard
20	MF	DEN	Vito Hammershøy-Mistrati
21	FW	GER	Bassala Sambou (on loan from Fortuna Sittard)
22	MF	DEN	Mathias Greve
23	FW	AUS	Nikola Mileusnic
25	GK	DEN	Jonas Dakir
35	MF	DEN	Mads Enggård
37	DF	DEN	Christoffer Petersen
38	FW	DEN	Karl Leth
40	MF	DEN	Filip Bundgaard
42	FW	DEN	Kasper Høgh
45	FW	AUT	Marvin Egho
99	FW	SLE	Alhaji Kamara

== Transfers ==
=== In ===
No.	Pos	Player	Transferred from	Fee	Date	Source
10	MF	(Nigeria) Tosin Kehinde	(Portugal) Feirense	Undisclosed	24 August 2020	
21	FW	(Germany) Bassala Sambou	(Netherlands) Fortuna Sittard	Loan	5 October 2020	
23	FW	(Australia) Nikola Mileusnic	(Australia) Adelaide United	Free	5 October 2020	
16	MF	(Norway) Lasse Berg Johnsen	(Norway) Raufoss	Undisclosed	31 January 2021	

=== Out ===
No.	Pos	Player	Transferred to	Fee	Date	Source
18	FW	(Norway) Benjamin Stokke	(Norway) Vålerenga	Undisclosed	23 June 2020	
4	DF	(Denmark) Johnny Thomsen	Unattached	Released	30 June 2020	
6	DF	(Denmark) André Rømer	(Sweden) Elfsborg	Undisclosed	30 January 2021	
9	FW	(Denmark) Emil Riis Jakobsen	(England) Preston North End	Undisclosed	1 October 2020	
24	MF	(Niger) Issah Salou	(Denmark) Jammerbugt	Undisclosed	1 February 2021	

== Competitions ==
=== Overview ===
Competition	First match	Last match	Starting round	Final position	Record							
Competition	First match	Last match	Starting round	Final position	Pld	W	D	L	GF	GA	GD	Win %
Superliga	11 September 2020	May 2021	Matchday 1		29	10	6	13	39	34	+5	34.48
Danish Cup	6 October 2020	13 May 2021	Second round	Winners	8	6	2	0	20	5	+15	75.00
Total					37	16	8	13	59	39	+20	43.24

Last updated: 13 May 2021
Source: Weltfussball

=== Danish Superliga ===
==== Results summary ====
Overall								Home						Away					
Pld	W	D	L	GF	GA	GD	Pts	W	D	L	GF	GA	GD	W	D	L	GF	GA	GD
29	10	6	13	39	34	+5	36	5	3	7	24	21	+3	5	3	6	15	13	+2

Last updated: 9 May 2021.
Source: FBref

==== Regular season ====
===== Results by matchday =====
Matchday	1	2	3	4	5	6	7	8	9	10	11	12	13	14	15	16	17	18	19	20	21	22
Ground	A	H	A	H	A	H	A	H	A	H	A	H	A	H	H	A	H	A	A	H	A	H
Result	W	D	L	L	L	L	W	L	W	W	W	W	W	W	L	D	D	L	D	L	D	W
Position	1	2	6	8	8	10	10	10	9	8	6	5	4	3	5	5	5	5	5	5	5	5

Updated to match(es) played on 21 March 2021. Source: Weltfussball
A = Away; H = Home; W = Win; D = Draw; L = Loss

===== League table =====
Pos	Team	Pld	W	D	L	GF	GA	GD	Pts	Qualification
3	AGF	22	10	8	4	35	22	+13	38	Qualification for the Championship round
4	Copenhagen	22	10	5	7	39	35	+4	35	Qualification for the Championship round
5	Randers	22	9	5	8	31	21	+10	32	Qualification for the Championship round
6	Nordsjælland	22	7	8	7	35	30	+5	29	Qualification for the Championship round
7	SønderjyskE	22	8	4	10	30	32	−2	28	Qualification for the Relegation round

Source: Danish Football Association (in Danish), Soccerway
Rules for classification: 1) Points; 2) Goal difference; 3) Goals scored; 4) Away goals scored; 5) Play-off (played on neutral ground if determining teams for different rounds); 6) Draw.

===== Championship round =====
Pos	Team	Pld	W	D	L	GF	GA	GD	Pts	Qualification	BRO	MID	COP	AGF	NOR	RAN
2	Midtjylland	32	18	6	8	57	33	+24	60	Qualification for the Champions League second qualifying round	1–0	—	4–1	4–0	3–0	1–1
3	Copenhagen	32	16	7	9	61	53	+8	55	Qualification for the Europa Conference League second qualifying round	2–1	4–2	—	3–2	2–2	2–1
4	AGF (O)	32	13	9	10	48	42	+6	48	Qualification for the European play-off match	1–2	1–4	1–2	—	3–1	2–0
5	Nordsjælland	32	11	10	11	51	51	0	43		0–3	3–2	2–2	2–0	—	2–1
6	Randers	32	11	7	14	43	38	+5	40	Qualification for the Europa League play-off round (Note: Randers qualified for the Europa League play-off round by winning the 2020–21 Danish Cup.)	4–2	0–0	2–1	0–1	3–4	—

Source: Danish Football Association (in Danish), Soccerway
Legend: Blue = home team win; Yellow = draw; Red = away team win.
Rules for classification: 1) Points; 2) Goal difference; 3) Goals scored; 4) Away goals scored; 5) Play-off (played on neutral ground if determining teams for different rounds); 6) Draw.
(O) Play-off winners

==== Matches ====
===== Regular season =====
13 September 2020 1	Horsens	0–3	Randers	Horsens
14:00 CEST	Jacobsen (red card) 77'	Report	Piesinger 72'; Jakobsen 78', 90'	Stadium: CASA Arena; Attendance: 300; Referee: Jakob A. Sundberg

20 September 2020 2	Randers	1–1	AGF	Randers
16:00 CEST	Kamara 87'	Report	Hausner (red card) 2'; Mortensen 90'	Stadium: Randers Stadium; Attendance: 300; Referee: Mikkel Redder

26 September 2020 3	Midtjylland	1–0	Randers	Herning
20:00 CEST	Kraev 6'; Onyeka (yellow card) 22'; Brumado (yellow card) 49'	FCM Summary	Graves (yellow card) 29'; Lauenborg (yellow card) 38'	Stadium: MCH Arena; Attendance: 300; Referee: Morten Krogh

2 October 2021 4	Randers	1–2	Brøndby	Randers
19:00 CEST	Kamara 74'	Report	Rosted 14'; Uhre 64'; Schwäbe (yellow card) 90+1'	Stadium: Randers Stadium; Referee: Mads Kristoffersen

19 October 2020 5	Nordsjælland	1–0	Randers	Farum
19:00 CEST	Jenssen 36'; Rygaard (yellow card) 68'; Diomande (yellow card) 73'; Hansen (yellow card) 80'; Amon 85'	Report	Kallesøe (yellow card) 37'; Rømer (yellow card) 69'; Sambou (yellow card) 89'	Stadium: Farum Park; Attendance: 300; Referee: Benjamin Willaume-Jantzen

25 October 2020 6	Randers	1–2	SonderjyskE	Randers
16:00 CEST	Greve 8'; Kopplin (yellow card) 45+3'	Report	Jacobsen 6'; Ekani (yellow card) 25' (yellow-red card) 27'; Wright (yellow card) 39' (goal) 42'; Simonsen (yellow card) 83'; Bah (yellow card) 85'	Attendance: 300; Referee: Michael Tykgaard

30 October 2021 7	Vejle	0–3	Randers	Vejle
17:00 CET	Mucolli (yellow card) 45+1'; Milošević (yellow card) 53'; Greve (yellow card) 82'; Montao (yellow card) 82'; Sousa (yellow card) 90+2'	Report	Rømer (yellow card) 27' (goal) 54' (pen.); Egho (yellow card) 50'; Mistrati 84'; Klysner 90+4'	Stadium: Vejle Stadium; Attendance: 0 Referee: Jakob Kehlet

6 November 2020 8	Randers	1–2	AaB	Randers
19:00 CET	Rømer 79' (pen.)	Report	Okore 21'; Hiljemark 53'	Stadium: Randers Stadium; Attendance: 300; Referee: Mikkel Redder

23 November 2020 9	Copenhagen	1–2	Randers	Copenhagen
19:00 CET	Nelsson (yellow card) 26'; Kaufmann (yellow card) 39' (goal) 54'; Stamenic (yellow card) 66'	FCK Summary	Egho 40'; Kamara 70'; Kallesøe (yellow card) 90'	Stadium: Parken Stadium; Attendance: 246; Referee: Jørgen Daugbjerg Burchardt

27 November 2020 10	Randers	2–1	OB	Randers
19:00 CET	Kamara 35'; Lauenborg 55'; Rømer (yellow card) 90+7'	Report	O. Lund 82'; Larsen (yellow card) 90+7'; Gudjohnsen (yellow card) 90+7'	Stadium: Randers Stadium; Attendance: 250; Referee: Aydin Uslu

6 December 2020 11	Lyngby	0–3	Randers	Lyngby
18:00 CET	Fosgaard (yellow card) 70'	Report	Kamara (yellow card) 8' (goal) 46'; Lauenborg (yellow card) 26'; Kallesøe (yellow card) 63'; Rømer (yellow card) 70' (goal) 77' (pen.); Sambou 86'	Stadium: Lyngby Stadium; Attendance: 300; Referee: Jakob A. Sundberg; Fourth official: Mostafa Seyfi

12 December 2020 12	Randers	3–1	Vejle	Randers
19:00 CET	Kehinde (yellow card) 39'; Kamara 47'; Kopplin (yellow card) 52'; Mistrati 67'; Rømer 71' (pen.)	Report	Faghir 33'; Ramadani (yellow card) 70'	Stadium: Randers Stadium; Attendance: 300; Referee: Mads-Kristoffer Kristoffersen; Fourth official: Mikkel Redder

20 December 2020 13	SønderjyskE	0–1	Randers	Haderslev
14:00 CET	Wright (yellow card) 34' (yellow-red card) 45'; Ekani (yellow card) 85'	Report	Kamara (yellow card) 22'; Rømer (yellow card) 32'; Sambou (yellow card) 47' (goal) 71'; Greve (yellow card) 70'	Stadium: Sydbank Park; Attendance: 300; Referee: https://fbref.com/en/matches/577e8818/SonderjyskE-Randers-December-20-2020-Superliga

2 February 2021 14	Randers	3–0	Horsens	Randers
18:00 CET	Greve 5'; Mistrati 11'; Kamara 58'	Report		Stadium: Randers Stadium; Attendance: 0 Referee: Sandi Putros

8 February 2021 15	Randers	1–2	Midtjylland	Randers
19:00 CET	Marxen (yellow card) 63'; Kehinde (yellow card) 64'; Kamara 71'	FCM Summary	Pfeiffer 68'; Paulinho (yellow card) 70'; Cools (yellow card) 86'; Mabil 90+3'	Stadium: Randers Stadium; Attendance: 0 Referee: Mads-Kristoffer Kristoffersen

14 February 2021 16	AaB	0–0	Randers	Aalborg
14:00 CET	Granli (red card) 85'	Report		Stadium: Aalborg Stadium; Attendance: 0 Referee: Michael Tykgaard

21 February 2021 17	Randers	1–1	Nordsjælland	Randers
14:00 CET	Kehinde 43'; Rømer (yellow card) 60'; Høgh (yellow card) 90'	Report	Andersen 52'; Nnamani (yellow card) 81'	Stadium: Randers Stadium; Referee: Aydin Uslu

28 February 2021 18	OB	2–1	Randers	Odense
14:00 CET	Sabbi 45+3'; Lieder 58'; Laursen (yellow card) 77'; Kløve (yellow card) 79'; Christensen (yellow card) 87'	Report	Kamara 23'; Kehinde (yellow card) 45+2'; Høgh (yellow card) 59'; Egho (yellow card) 80'	Stadium: Odense Stadium; Attendance: 0 Referee: Jonas Hansen

4 March 2021 19	Brøndby	0–0	Randers	Brøndbyvester
20:00 CET	Vigen (yellow card) 15'; Lindstrøm (yellow card) 87'	Report	Piesinger (yellow card) 45+1'	Stadium: Brøndby Stadium; Attendance: 0 Referee: Mads-Kristoffer Kristoffersen; Fourth official: Benjamin Svedborg

7 March 2021 20	Randers	1–2	Lyngby	Randers
12:00 CET	Egho 29'; Lauenborg (yellow card) 51'; Greve (yellow card) 54'; Nielsen (yellow card) 26' (yellow-red card) 60'; Johnsen (yellow card) 90'	Report	Gammelby (yellow card) 56'; Jakobsen (yellow card) 75'; Nielsen 87' (pen.); Kaastrup 90'	Stadium: Randers Stadium; Attendance: 0 Referee: Anders Poulsen; Fourth official: Lasse Graagaard

15 March 2021 21	AGF	1–1	Randers	Aarhus
19:00 CET	Links 5'; Juelsgård (yellow card) 48'; Mortensen (yellow card) 87'; Olsen (yellow card) 90+3'	Report	Piesinger (yellow card) 64'; Kopplin (yellow card) 81'; Mistrati 90'; Kehinde (yellow card) 90+2'	Stadium: Aarhus Stadium; Attendance: 0 Referee: Michael Tykgaard; Fourth official: Peter Kjærsgaard-Andersen

21 March 2021 22	Randers	2–1	Copenhagen	Randers
17:00 CET	Johnsen 38'; Greve 81'; Lauridsen (yellow card) 90+1'	FCK Summary	Lerager 41'; Daramy (yellow card) 45'; Wind (yellow card) 86'	Stadium: Randers Stadium; Attendance: 0 Referee: Jens Maae

===== Championship round =====
5 April 2021 23	Copenhagen	2–1	Randers	Copenhagen
16:00 CET	Wilczek 10' (Wind); Fischer 18' (Falk)	FCK Summary	Egho 7' (Marxen) Kopplin (yellow card) 25'	Stadium: Telia Parken; Attendance: 0 Referee: Morten Krogh

11 April 2021 24	Randers	3–4	Nordsjælland	Randers
14:00 CET	Egho 32'; Hammershøy-Mistrati 54', 87'	Report	Jensen 9', 71'; Sulemana 29', 42'	Stadium: Randers Stadium; Attendance: 0 Referee: Jakob Kehlet

19 April 2021 25	Randers	0–0	Midtjylland	Randers
18:00 CEST	Nielsen (yellow card) 86'	FCM Summary	Kaba (yellow card) 50'; Cajuste (yellow card) 57'; Sviatchenko (yellow card) 74'	Stadium: Cepheus Park Randers; Attendance: 0 Referee: Morten Krogh

22 April 2021 26	AGF	2–0	Randers	Aarhus
17:45 CEST	Grønbæk 7'; Ammitzbøll 90+3'	Report		Stadium: Aarhus Stadium; Attendance: 0 Referee: Sandi Putros

26 April 2021 27	Brøndby	2–0	Randers	Brøndbyvester
16:00 CEST	Uhre 41'; Slimane 78'	Report		Stadium: Brøndby Stadium; Attendance: 7,488; Referee: Jakob Kehlet

2 May 2021 28	Randers	4–2	Brøndby	Randers
16:00 CEST	Kehinde 29'; Hammershøy-Mistrati 46', 48' (pen.); Klysner 87'	Report	Hermannsson 16'; Hedlund 73'	Stadium: Randers Stadium; Attendance: 3,157; Referee: Jakob A. Sundberg

9 May 2021 29	Randers	0–1	AGF	Randers
16:00 CEST		Report	Diks 22'	Stadium: Randers Stadium; Referee: Michael Tykgaard

16 May 2021 30	Midtjylland	1–1	Randers	Herning
18:00 CEST	Sviatchenko (yellow card) 45+2'; Evander 80'	FCM Summary	Hammershøy-Mistrati 45+2' (pen.); Graves (yellow card) 53'; Egho (yellow card) 70'; Greve (yellow card) 72'; Kopplin (yellow card) 88'; Lauenborg (yellow card) 88'	Stadium: MCH Arena; Attendance: 4,450; Referee: Jakob Kehlet

24 May 2021 32	Randers	v	Copenhagen	Randers
17:00 CET				Stadium: Randers Stadium

=== Danish Cup ===
6 October 2020 Second round	FC Sydvest 05	1–4	Randers	Tønder
	Clausen 44'	Report	Egho 17'; Nielsen 31'; Lauridsen 54'; Sambou 67'	Stadium: BankParken

10 November 2020 Third round	Aarhus Fremad	1–3	Randers	Aarhus
	Ullum	Report	Sambou; Bundgaard	Stadium: Riisvangen Stadium

15 December 2020 Fourth round	Holstebro	1–3	Randers	Holstebro
	Lauridsen 88'	Report	Nielsen 44'; Kamara 56'; Klysner 81'	Stadium: Holstebro Idrætspark

11 February 2021 Quarter-finals 1st leg	Vejle	0–0	Randers	Vejle
20:15 CET		Report		Stadium: Vejle Stadium; Attendance: 0 Referee: Morten Krogh

10 March 2021 Quarter-finals 2nd leg	Randers	3–1 (3–1 agg.)	Vejle	Randers
18:00 CET	Egho 13', 38'; Mileusnic 45+1'	Report	Engel 10'	Stadium: Randers Stadium; Attendance: 0 Referee: Jens Maae

8 April 2021 Semi-finals 1st leg	AGF	0–2	Randers	Aarhus
19:00 CEST	Hausner (yellow card) 70'	Report	Hammershøy-Mistrati 66'; Egho 71' (pen.)	Stadium: Aarhus Stadium; Attendance: 0 Referee: Michael Tykgaard

15 April 2021 Semi-finals 2nd leg	Randers	1–1 (3–1 agg.)	AGF	Randers
19:00 CEST	Egho 41'; Marxen (yellow card) 90+2'	Report	Mortensen 24'; Links (yellow card) 54'	Stadium: Randers Stadium; Attendance: 0 Referee: Mads-Kristoffer Kristoffersen

13 May 2021 Final	Randers	4–0	SønderjyskE	Aarhus
16:30 CEST	Marxen 2'; Greve 7', 81'; Piesinger 52'; Kallesøe (yellow card) 71'	Report	Eskesen (yellow card) 19'; Albæk (yellow card) 83'; Dal Hende (yellow card) 86'	Stadium: Aarhus Stadium

== Statistics ==
=== Goalscorers ===
Rank	No.	Pos	Nat	Name	Superliga	Danish Cup	Total
1	99	FW	(Sierra Leone)	Alhaji Kamara	9	1	10
2	20	MF	(Denmark)	Vito Hammershøy-Mistrati	8	1	9
2	45	FW	(Austria)	Marvin Egho	4	5	9
4	21	FW	(Germany)	Bassala Sambou	2	3	5
4	22	MF	(Denmark)	Mathias Greve	3	2	5
6	6	DF	(Denmark)	André Rømer	4	0	4
7	18	FW	(Denmark)	Tobias Klysner	2	1	3
8	5	DF	(Denmark)	Mathias Nielsen	0	2	2
8	8	MF	(Austria)	Simon Piesinger	1	1	2
8	9	FW	(Denmark)	Emil Riis Jakobsen	2	0	2
8	10	MF	(Nigeria)	Tosin Kehinde	2	0	2
12	11	DF	(Denmark)	Erik Marxen	0	1	1
12	14	MF	(Denmark)	Frederik Lauenborg	1	0	1
12	16	MF	(Norway)	Lasse Berg Johnsen	1	0	1
12	17	DF	(Denmark)	Jesper Lauridsen	0	1	1
12	23	FW	(Australia)	Nikola Mileusnic	0	1	1
12	40	MF	(Denmark)	Filip Bundgaard	0	1	1
Own goals					0	0	0
Totals					39	20	59

Last updated: 13 May 2021

=== Clean sheets ===
Rank	No.	Pos	Nat	Name	Superliga	Danish Cup	Total
1	1	GK	(Sweden)	Patrik Carlgren	8	3	11

Last updated: 13 May 2021
