= 2021 Danish Cup final =

2021 Sydbank Pokalen final
- Event: 2020–21 Danish Cup
Randers FC	SønderjyskE
4	0
- Date: 13 May 2021
- Venue: Ceres Park, Aarhus
- Attendance: 7,981

The 2021 Danish Cup final was played on 13 May 2021 between SønderjyskE and Randers FC at Ceres Park, Aarhus, a neutral ground. Randers captured their second title in team history in the culmination of the 2020–21 Danish Cup, the 67th season of the Sydbank Pokalen.

SønderjyskE appeared in its second consecutive Sydbank Pokalen final, after capturing their first club title of any kind in 2020. Randers appeared in its third championship game, and its first since 2013. Randers is now 2–1 in Sydbank Pokalen finals, having won its other title in 2006.

By virtue of the win, Randers earned an automatic berth into the playoff round of the 2021–22 UEFA Europa League.

== Teams ==
Team	Previous finals appearances (bold indicates winners)
SønderjyskE	1 (**2020**)
Randers FC	2 (**2006**, 2013)

== Venue ==
For just the fourth time in cup history, the final will be played in a venue other than the Copenhagen Sports Park (1955–1990), or Parken Stadium (1993–2019). Ceres Park in Aarhus will host its first ever Sydbank Pokalen final in 2021. Odense Stadium hosted the 1991 final while the 1992 final was played at Aarhus Idrætspark.

== Route to the final ==
Note: In all results below, the score of the finalist is given first (H: home; A: away).

SønderjyskE		Round	Randers FC	
Opponent	Result		Opponent	Result
Bye		First round	Bye	
Bye		Second round	FC Sydvest 05	1–4 (A)
Skive IK	0–1 (A)	Third round	Aarhus Fremad	1–3 (A)
Lyngby BK	2–1 (a.e.t) (H)	Fourth round	Holstebro BK	1–3 (A)
Fremad Amager	**6–2 (agg.)**; 1–2 (A) / 4–1 (H)	Quarterfinals	Vejle BK	**3–1 (agg.)**; 0–0 (A) / 3–1 (H)
FC Midtjylland	**3–2 (agg.)**; 1–0 (A) / 3–1 (H)	Semifinals	AGF	**3–1 (agg.)**; 0–2 (A) / 1–1 (H)

== Match ==
=== Details ===
13 May 2021
15:00

Randers FC (1)	4–0	SønderjyskE (1)
Marxen 2'; Greve 7', 81'; Piesinger 52'; Kallesøe (yellow card) 71'		Eskesen (yellow card) 19'; Albæk (yellow card) 83'; Dal Hende (yellow card) 86'

Ceres Park, Aarhus
Attendance: 7,981
Referee: Morten Krogh

**Randers**	**SønderjyskE**

GK	1	(Sweden) Patrik Carlgren
DF	7	(Denmark) Mikkel Kallesøe	(substituted off) 80' (yellow card) 71'
DF	8	(Austria) Simon Piesinger	53'
DF	11	(Denmark) Erik Marxen	2'
DF	15	(Germany) Björn Kopplin
MF	6	(Norway) Lasse Berg Johnsen	(substituted off) 89'
MF	10	(Nigeria) Tosin Kehinde	(substituted off) 70'
MF	14	(Denmark) Frederik Lauenborg
MF	22	(Denmark) Mathias Greve	(substituted off) 88' (goal) 7', 81'
FW	20	(Denmark) Vito Hammershøy-Mistrati	(substituted off) 80'
FW	45	(Austria) Marvin Egho
Substitutes:
FW	18	(Denmark) Tobias Klysner	(substituted on) 70'
DF	17	(Denmark) Jesper Lauridsen	(substituted on) 80'
DF	2	(Denmark) Simon Graves Jensen	(substituted on) 80'
FW	23	(Australia) Nikola Mileusnic	(substituted on) 88'
DF	5	(Denmark) Mathias Nielsen	(substituted on) 89'
GK	25	(Denmark) Jonas Dakir
FW	42	(Denmark) Kasper Høgh
Coach:
(Denmark) Thomas Thomasberg

GK	1	(Australia) Lawrence Thomas
DF	2	(Denmark) Stefan Gartenmann
DF	5	(Denmark) Marc Dal Hende	(yellow card) 86'
DF	12	(Denmark) Pierre Kanstrup
DF	26	(Denmark) Patrick Banggaard	(substituted off) 46'
MF	7	(Denmark) Julius Eskesen	(substituted off) 46' (yellow card) 19'
MF	21	(Denmark) Jeppe Simonsen
MF	29	(Cameroon) Victor Ekani	(substituted off) 74'
MF	77	(Nigeria) Rilwan Hassan	(substituted off) 65'
FW	10	(Denmark) Anders K. Jacobsen
FW	25	(United States) Haji Wright	(substituted off) 74'
Substitutes:
MF	22	(Denmark) Emil Frederiksen	(substituted on) 46'
DF	3	(Sweden) Emil Holm	(substituted on) 46'
MF	90	(Denmark) Mads Albæk	(substituted on) 65' (yellow card) 83'
FW	11	(Norway) Bård Finne	(substituted on) 74'
MF	20	(Denmark) Peter Christiansen	(substituted on) 74'
GK	28	(Denmark) Nicolai Flø
DF	6	(Austria) Philipp Schmiedl
Coach:
(Denmark) Glen Riddersholm

Assistant referees: Jakob Mastrup and Steffen Beck Bramsen

**Match rules**

- 90 minutes.
- 30 minutes of extra time if necessary.
- Penalty shoot-out if scores still level.
- Seven named substitutes, of which up to five may be used.
