= 2020–21 FC Midtjylland season =

FC Midtjylland
2020–21 season
- Owner: Matthew Benham
- Chairman: Rasmus Ankersen
- Manager: Brian Priske
- Stadium: MCH Arena
- Superliga: 2nd
- Danish Cup: Semi-finals
- UEFA Champions League: Group stage
- Top goalscorer: League: Sory Kaba (11 goals); All: Sory Kaba (14 goals)
- Biggest win: 5–0 (21 March 2021 vs. Vejle)
- Biggest defeat: 0–4 (21 October 2020 vs. Atalanta
Home colours	Away colours	Third colours

The 2020–21 FC Midtjylland season was FC Midtjylland's 22nd season of existence, and their 20th consecutive season in the Danish Superliga, the top tier of football in Denmark. As a result of the club's league title in 2019–20, it qualified for the 2020–21 UEFA Champions League, advancing to the group stage and vied for the 2020–21 Danish Cup, losing in the semi-finals.

== Squad ==
As of 1 February 2021

No.	Name	Nat	Position	Since	Date of birth	Signed from
Goalkeepers
1	Jesper Hansen	(Denmark)	GK	2017	31 March 1985	(Denmark) Lyngby BK
16	Valdemar Birksø	(Denmark)	GK	2021	17 March 2001	(Denmark) Homegrown
30	Oliver Ottesen	(Denmark)	GK	2017	22 August 1998	(Denmark) Roskilde
31	Mikkel Andersen	(Denmark)	GK	2018	17 December 1988	(Denmark) Lyngby BK
49	Jonas Lössl	(Denmark)	GK	2021	1 February 1989	(England) Everton F.C.
Defenders
2	Dion Cools	(Belgium) (Malaysia)	DF	2020	4 June 1996	(Belgium) Club Brugge
5	Daniel Høegh	(Denmark)	DF	2020	6 January 1991	(Netherlands) SC Heerenveen
6	Joel Andersson	(Sweden)	DF	2018	11 November 1996	(Sweden) BK Häcken
14	Alexander Scholz	(Denmark) (Germany)	DF	2018	24 October 1992	(Belgium) Club Brugge
17	Ailton	(Brazil)	DF	2021	16 March 1995	(Germany) VfB Stuttgart
18	Kristian Riis	(Denmark)	DF	2016	17 February 1997	Homegrown
27	Oliver Olsen	(Denmark)	DF	2018	13 August 2000	(Denmark) Esbjerg fB Youth
28	Erik Sviatchenko	(Denmark)	DF	2018	4 October 1991	(Scotland) Celtic F.C.
29	Paulinho	(Brazil)	DF	2019	3 January 1995	(Brazil) Bahia
46	Japhet Sery Larsen	(Denmark)	DF	2020	10 April 2000	(England) Brentford F.C. B
50	Hosine Bility	(Australia)	DF	2021	10 May 2001	(Denmark) FC Midtjylland U19
Midfielders
7	Pione Sisto	(Denmark) (South Sudan)	MF	2020	4 February 1995	(Spain) Celta de Vigo
10	Evander	(Brazil)	MF	2018	9 June 1998	(Brazil) CR Vasco da Gama
11	Awer Mabil	(Australia)	MF	2015	15 September 1995	(Australia) Adelaide United FC
34	Mikael Anderson	(Iceland)	MF	2019	1 July 1998	(Netherlands) SBV Excelsior
36	Anders Dreyer	(Denmark)	MF	2020	2 May 1998	(England) Brighton & Hove Albion F.C.
38	Frank Onyeka	(Nigeria)	MF	2017	1 January 1998	(Nigeria) F.C. Ebedei
40	Jens Cajuste	(Sweden)	MF	2018	10 August 1999	(Sweden) Örgryte IS
43	Nicolas Madsen	(Denmark)	MF	2017	17 March 2000	Homegrown
45	Gustav Isaksen	(Denmark)	MF	2019	19 April 2001	Homegrown
Forwards
9	Sory Kaba	(Guinea)	FW	2019	28 July 1995	(France) Dijon FCO
26	Lasse Vibe	(Denmark)	FW	2020	22 February 1987	(Sweden) IFK Göteborg
33	Luca Pfeiffer	(Germany)	FW	2020	20 August 1996	(Germany) Würzburger Kickers
48	Mads Hansen	(Denmark)	FW	2021	28 July 2002	Homegrown
58	Aral Simsir	(Denmark) (Turkey)	FW	2021	19 June 2002	Homegrown
74	Júnior Brumado	(Brazil)	FW	2019	15 May 1999	(Brazil) EC Bahia

=== Out on loan ===
Note: Flags indicate national team as defined under FIFA eligibility rules; some limited exceptions apply. Players may hold more than one non-FIFA nationality.

No.	Pos.	Nation	Player
—	FW	CRC	Mayron George (at Pau until 30 June 2021)
—	MF	BUL	Bozhidar Kraev (at Famalicão until 30 June 2021)
—	MF	NGR	Babajide David (at Hatayspor until 30 June 2021)
—	DF	CAN	Manjrekar James (at Lamia until 30 June 2021)
—	DF	DEN	Rasmus Nicolaisen (at Portsmouth until 30 June 2021)
—	DF	DEN	Nikolas Dyhr (at AC Horsens until 30 June 2021)
—	DF	DEN	Søren Reese (at AC Horsens until 30 June 2021)
—	FW	DEN	Casper Tengstedt (at AC Horsens until 30 June 2021)

No.	Pos.	Nation	Player
—	MF	DEN	Victor Torp (at Lyngby Boldklub until 30 June 2021)
—	GK	ISL	Elías Ólafsson (at Fredericia until 30 June 2021)
—	MF	NGR	Raphael Onyedika (at Fredericia until 30 June 2021)
—	DF	DEN	Tobias Anker (at Fredericia until 30 June 2021)
—	MF	DEN	Christian Tue Jensen (at Fredericia until 30 June 2021)
—	MF	DEN	Oliver Sørensen (at Fredericia until 30 June 2021)
—	FW	DEN	Sebastian Buch (at Skive IK until 30 June 2021)
—	MF	COD	Gloire Rutikanga (at Thisted until 30 June 2021)

== Transfers ==
=== Arrivals ===
==== Summer ====
Position	Player	Transferred from	Date	Fee	Source
MF	(Denmark) Pione Sisto	(Spain) Celta de Vigo	5 September 2020	£2,500,000	
FW	(Germany) Luca Pfeiffer	(Germany) Würzburger Kickers	5 October 2020	£1,500,000	
DF	(Denmark) Daniel Høegh	(Netherlands) Heerenveen	5 October 2020	Free	

==== Winter ====
Position	Player	Transferred from	Date	Fee	Source
MF	(Brazil) Ailton	(Germany) Stuttgart	1 February 2020	Undisclosed	
GK	(Denmark) Jonas Lössl	(England) Everton	1 February 2020	Free	

=== Departures ===
==== Summer ====
Position	Player	Transferred to	Date	Fee	Source
MF	(Ukraine) Artem Dovbyk	(Ukraine) SC Dnipro-1	1 August 2020	€450,000	
MF	(Finland) Tim Sparv	(Greece) AE Larisa	26 August 2020	Free transfer	
MF	(Denmark) Nikolaj Kirk	(Denmark) Aarhus Fremad	5 August 2020	Undisclosed	
MF	(Denmark) Marc Dal Hende	(Denmark) SønderjyskE	9 August 2020	Undisclosed	
MF	(Denmark) Ayo Simon Okosun	(Denmark) Odense BK	5 October 2020	Undisclosed	

==== Winter ====
Position	Player	Transferred to	Date	Fee	Source
MF	(Finland) Kaan Kairinen	(Norway) Lillestrøm	15 December 2020	Undisclosed	
MF	(Ghana) Michael Baidoo	(Norway) Jerv	16 December 2020	Undisclosed	
FW	(Denmark) Ronnie Schwartz	(England) Charlton Athletic	4 January 2021	€295,000	

== Non-competitive ==
=== Mid-season friendlies ===
19 January 2021	AGF	0–2	Midtjylland	Aarhus
13:00 CEST				Stadium: Anlæg Kunstgræsbane 2 (Viby J)

28 January 2021	Silkeborg IF	0–2	Midtjylland	Silkeborg
13:00 CEST				Stadium: JYSK Park

29 January 2021	Midtjylland	2–0	Esbjerg fB	Ikast
13:00 CEST				Stadium: Wunderelf Arena

== Competitive ==
=== Competition record ===
Competition	Record							
Competition	G	W	D	L	GF	GA	GD	Win %
Danish Superliga	32	18	6	8	57	33	+24	56.25
Danish Cup	6	4	1	1	9	4	+5	66.67
UEFA Champions League	10	3	3	4	12	14	−2	30.00
Total	48	25	10	13	78	51	+27	52.08

Last updated: 24 May 2021.
Source: Competitive matches

=== Danish Superliga ===
==== Regular season ====
Pos	Team	Pld	W	D	L	GF	GA	GD	Pts	Qualification
1	Brøndby	22	14	3	5	40	24	+16	45	Qualification for the Championship round
2	Midtjylland	22	13	4	5	35	20	+15	43	Qualification for the Championship round
3	AGF	22	10	8	4	35	22	+13	38	Qualification for the Championship round
4	Copenhagen	22	10	5	7	39	35	+4	35	Qualification for the Championship round
5	Randers	22	9	5	8	31	21	+10	32	Qualification for the Championship round
6	Nordsjælland	22	7	8	7	35	30	+5	29	Qualification for the Championship round
7	SønderjyskE	22	8	4	10	30	32	−2	28	Qualification for the Relegation round
8	OB	22	7	7	8	25	28	−3	28	Qualification for the Relegation round
9	AaB	22	7	7	8	24	30	−6	28	Qualification for the Relegation round
10	Vejle	22	6	6	10	25	37	−12	24	Qualification for the Relegation round
11	Lyngby	22	5	5	12	25	43	−18	20	Qualification for the Relegation round
12	Horsens	22	2	6	14	15	37	−22	12	Qualification for the Relegation round

Source: Danish Football Association (in Danish), Soccerway
Rules for classification: 1) Points; 2) Goal difference; 3) Goals scored; 4) Away goals scored; 5) Play-off (played on neutral ground if determining teams for different rounds); 6) Draw.

==== Championship round ====
Pos	Team	Pld	W	D	L	GF	GA	GD	Pts	Qualification	BRO	MID	COP	AGF	NOR	RAN
1	Brøndby (C)	32	19	4	9	58	38	+20	61	Qualification for the Champions League play-off round	—	3–1	1–3	2–2	2–0	2–0
2	Midtjylland	32	18	6	8	57	33	+24	60	Qualification for the Champions League second qualifying round	1–0	—	4–1	4–0	3–0	1–1
3	Copenhagen	32	16	7	9	61	53	+8	55	Qualification for the Europa Conference League second qualifying round	2–1	4–2	—	3–2	2–2	2–1
4	AGF (O)	32	13	9	10	48	42	+6	48	Qualification for the European play-off match	1–2	1–4	1–2	—	3–1	2–0
5	Nordsjælland	32	11	10	11	51	51	0	43		0–3	3–2	2–2	2–0	—	2–1

Source: Danish Football Association (in Danish), Soccerway
Legend: Blue = home team win; Yellow = draw; Red = away team win.
Rules for classification: 1) Points; 2) Goal difference; 3) Goals scored; 4) Away goals scored; 5) Play-off (played on neutral ground if determining teams for different rounds); 6) Draw.
(C) Champions; (O) Play-off winners

===== Regular season =====
11 September 2020 1	SonderjyskE	2–0	Midtjylland	Haderslev
19:00 CEST	Bah 57'; Wright 90' (Ekani)	FCM Summary	Cools (yellow card) 48'	Stadium: Sydbank Park; Attendance: 2,210; Referee: Mads-Kristoffer Kristoffersen

19 September 2020 2	Midtjylland	1–0	Lyngby BK	Herning
15:30 CEST	Evander (yellow card) 13'; Sisto 14'; Kraev (yellow card) 41'; Scholz (yellow card) 45'	FCM Summary	Winther (yellow card) 20'; Gytkjær (yellow card) 37'	Stadium: MCH Arena; Attendance: 300; Referee: Jakob Kehlet

26 September 2020 3	Midtjylland	1–0	Randers	Herning
20:00 CEST	Kraev 6' (Dyhr); Onyeka (yellow card) 22'; Brumado (yellow card) 49'	FCM Summary	Graves (yellow card) 29'; Lauenborg (yellow card) 38'	Stadium: MCH Arena; Attendance: 300; Referee: Morten Krogh

4 October 2020 4	Horsens	2–2	Midtjylland	Horsens
18:00 CEST	Pohl 35' (Tengstedt) 45' (pen.) (yellow card) 56'; Ludwig (yellow card) 56'; Jensen (yellow card) 89'	FCM Summary	Dreyer 23' (Sisto); Brumado 23' (Dreyer) (yellow card) 72'	Stadium: CASA Arena Horsens; Attendance: 300; Referee: Peter Kjærsgaard-Andersen

17 October 2020 5	Midtjylland	3–1	OB	Herning
16:00 CEST	Cajuste (yellow card) 33'; Kaba (yellow card) 50' (goal) 66' (Sviatchenko); Dreyer 81' (Kaba); Sisto 86'	FCM Summary	Sabbi 26' (Frøkjær-Jensen) (yellow card) 56'; Okosun (yellow card) 31'; Thomasen (yellow card) 31'	Stadium: MCH Arena; Attendance: 300; Referee: Michael Tykgaard

24 October 2020 6	Brøndby IF	2–3	Midtjylland	Brøndbyvester
19:00 CEST	Rosted (yellow card) 15' (yellow-red card) 80'; Bruus 16' (Frendrup); Pavlović (yellow card) 38'; Uhre (yellow card) 45+1'; Lindstrøm 51' (Uhre); Radošević (yellow card) 72'; Maxsø (yellow card) 90+4'		Evander (yellow card) 45+1'; Sviatchenko (yellow card) 56'; Dreyer; Sisto 73'; Cajuste (yellow card) 85'; Schwäbe 90+4' (o.g.)	Stadium: Brøndby Stadion; Attendance: 300; Referee: Jorgen Daugburg Burchardt

31 October 2020 7	Nordsjælland	4–1	Midtjylland	Farum
16:00 CEST	Francis 11' (Jenssen) 45' (Diomande); Frese 52' (Francis); Sulemana 70' (Hansen)	FCM Report	James (yellow card) 33'; Dreyer 34'	Stadium: Right to Dream Park; Attendance: 300; Referee: Jakob A. Sundberg

8 November 2020 8	Midtjylland	4–0	Copenhagen	Herning
18:00 CET	Kaba 36'; Evander 41' (Kaba); Sisto 48' (Dreyer) 68' (Kaba); Paulinho (yellow card) 64'	FCM Summary	Falk (yellow card) 15'; Fischer (yellow card) 26' (yellow-red card) 50'; Nelsson (yellow card) 90+2'	Stadium: MCH Arena; Attendance: 258; Referee: Mads-Kristoffer Kristoffersen

22 November 2020 9	AGF	1–2	Midtjylland	Aarhus
16:00 CET	Sviatchenko (yellow card) 25'; Onyeka 27' (yellow card) 51'; Kaba 34' (Onyeka)	FCM Summary	Juelsgård (yellow card) 43'; Mortensen 63' (pen.)	Stadium: Ceres Park; Referee: Jens Maae

28 November 2020 10	Midtjylland	0–0	AaB	Herning
16:00 CET	Madsen (yellow card) 39'; Cools (yellow card) 68'	FCM Summary	Thelander (yellow card) 23'; Ahlmann (yellow card) 42'; Højholt (yellow card) 72'	Stadium: MCH Arena; Referee: Anders Poulsen

5 December 2020 11	Vejle BK	0–2	Midtjylland	Vejle
19:00 CET	Mølgaard (yellow card) 71'; Jensen (yellow card) 81'; Hetemi (yellow card) 90+6'	FCM Summary	Paulinho (yellow card) 15'; Sviatchenko 45+2' (Evander); Scholz 67' (pen.)	Stadium: Vejle Stadium; Referee: Morten Krogh

14 December 2020 12	OB	1–1	Midtjylland	Odense
17:00 CET	Opondo 14' (Sabbi) (yellow card) 90+4'; Drachmann (yellow card) 45+3'	FCM Summary	Anderson (yellow card) 63'; Kaba; Isaksen (yellow card) 84'	Stadium: Nature Energy Park; Referee: Sandi Putros

21 December 2020 13	Midtjylland	3–1	Nordsjælland	Herning
16:00 CET	Dreyer 8'; Scholz 12' (Dreyer); Kaba 67' (Cools)	FCM Summary	Mesík (yellow card) 33'; Rygaard 45+3'	Stadium: MCH Arena; Referee: Mads-Kristoffer Kristoffersen

4 February 2021 14	Midtjylland	1–2	SønderjyskE	Herning
18:00 CET	Cajuste (yellow card) 33'; Sviatchenko 90+'	FCM Summary	Frederiksen (yellow card) 23'; Albæk 45'; Gartenmann (yellow card) 47'; Eskesen (yellow card) 76'; Jacobsen 80' (Gartenmann); Kanstrup (yellow card) 88'; Dal Hende (yellow card) 89'	Stadium: MCH Arena; Referee: Peter Kjærsgaard-Andersen

8 February 2021 15	Randers	1–2	Midtjylland	Randers
19:00 CET	Marxen (yellow card) 63'; Kehinde (yellow card) 64'; Kamara 71' (Marxen)	FCM Summary	Pfeiffer; Paulinho (yellow card) 70'; Cools (yellow card) 86'; Mabil 90+3' (Dreyer)	Stadium: Cepheus Park; Attendance: 0 Referee: Mads-Kristoffer Kristoffersen

14 February 2021 16	Midtjylland	1–0	Horsens	Herning
18:00 CET	Onyeka (yellow card) 50'; Cools 71' (Sisto)	FCM Summary	Jacobsen (yellow card) 3'; Qamili (yellow card) 90+1'	Stadium: MCH Arena; Attendance: 0 Referee: Jakob Kehlet

19 February 2021 17	AaB	0–2	Midtjylland	Aalborg
19:00 CET	Thelander (yellow card) 79'	FCM Summary	Kaba 27' (yellow card) 38'; Evander 72'	Stadium: Aalborg Portland Park; Attendance: 0 Referee: Jørgen Burchardt

28 February 2021 18	Midtjylland	1–0	Brøndby	Herning
18:00 CET	Isaksen 65'; Paulinho (yellow card) 87' (yellow-red card) 90+3'; Cools (yellow card) 90'	FCM Summary	Bjur (yellow card) 64'	Stadium: MCH Arena; Attendance: 0 Referee: Jakob Kehlet

4 March 2021 19	Lyngby BK	2–0	Midtjylland	Lyngby
18:00 CET	Nielsen 34' (Kaastrum); Warming (yellow card) 90+2' (goal) 90+3' (Torp)	FCM Summary	Evander (yellow card) 35'; Isaksen (yellow card) 42' (yellow-red card) 51'; Mabil (yellow card) 65'; Madsen (red card) 90'	Stadium: Lyngby Stadium; Attendance: 0 Referee: Jens Maae

7 March 2021 20	Midtjylland	0–1	AGF	Herning
16:00 CET	Kaba (yellow card) 54'; Cajuste (yellow card) 56'	FCM Summary	Mortensen 9' (Links); Poulsen (yellow card) 38'; Diks (yellow card) 90+3'	Stadium: MCH Arena; Attendance: 0 Referee: Peter Kjærsgaard-Andersen

14 March 2021 21	Copenhagen	0–0	Midtjylland	Copenhagen
18:00 CET	Lerager (yellow card) 44'; Wind (yellow card) 53'; Bartolec (yellow card) 57'	FCM Summary	Scholz (yellow card) 5'; Sviatchenko (yellow card) 52'; Ailton (yellow card) 88'; Onyeka (yellow card) 90+1'	Stadium: Telia Parken; Attendance: 0 Referee: Mads-Kristoffer Kristoffersen

21 March 2021 22	Midtjylland	5–0	Vejle BK	Herning
17:00 CET	Evander (yellow card) 21' (goal) 70' (Mabil); Scholz 27' (Sviatchenko); Sery (yellow card) 30'; Cajuste 45+3' (Mabil); Kaba 52' 86'; Paulinho (yellow card) 63'	FCM Summary	Ojala (red card) 35'	Stadium: MCH Arena; Attendance: 0 Referee: Mikkel Redder

===== Championship round =====
5 April 2021 23	Midtjylland	1–0	Brøndby IF	Herning
18:00 CEST	Kaba 19' (Sviatchenko); Lössl (yellow card) 89'; Cajuste (yellow card) 90+6'	FCM Summary	Mensah (yellow card) 65'; Slimane (yellow card) 82'	Stadium: MCH Arena; Attendance: 0 Referee: Mads-Kristoffer Kristoffersen

11 April 2021 24	AGF	1–4	Midtjylland	Aarhus
18:00 CEST	Grønbæk (yellow card) 44'; Olsen (yellow card) 45+5'; Mortensen (yellow card) 45+4' (goal) 61'; Links (yellow card) 56'; Hvidt (yellow card) 58'; Juelsgård (yellow card) 88'	FCM Summary	Onyeka 16'; Dreyer (yellow card) 43'; Scholz (yellow card) 45+4' (goal) 52' (pen.); Anderson 83' (Isaksen); Evander 89'	Stadium: Aarhus Stadium; Attendance: 0 Referee: Peter Kjærsgaard-Andersen

19 April 2021 25	Randers FC	0–0	Midtjylland	Randers
18:00 CEST	Nielsen (yellow card) 86'	FCM Summary	Kaba (yellow card) 50'; Cajuste (yellow card) 57'; Sviatchenko (yellow card) 74'	Stadium: Cepheus Park Randers; Attendance: 0 Referee: Morten Krogh

22 April 2021 26	Midtjylland	4–1	Copenhagen	Herning
21:00 CET	Cajuste (yellow card) 22'; Brumado 25' (Evander); Onyeka (yellow card) 38'; Dreyer 49' (Evander); Sisto 56' (Evander); Vibe 81'; Høegh (yellow card) 90'	FCM Summary	Wind (yellow card) 37'; Daramy (yellow card) 45'; Bundu 71' (Kristiansen)	Stadium: MCH Arena; Attendance: 4,450; Referee: Jørgen Daugbjerg Burchardt

26 April 2021 27	Nordsjælland	3–2	Midtjylland	Farum
19:00 CEST	Onyeka 29' (o.g.); Sulemana 66' (pen.) (yellow card) 89'; Frese (yellow card) 74'; Tyhcosen (yellow card) 80'; Villadsen (yellow card) 84'; Adingra 90' (Kofod Andersen) (yellow card) 90+6'	FCM Summary	Kaba 45' (Cajuste); Sisto 54' (Anderson); Scholz (yellow card) 73'; Lössl (yellow card) 83'	Stadium: Right to Dream Park; Attendance: 1,793; Referee: Aydin Uslu

2 May 2021 28	Midtjylland	3–0	Nordsjælland	Herning
18:00 CEST	Scholz 22' (pen.); Sisto 24' (Dreyer); Onyeka 77' (Kaba)	FCM Summary	Jenssen (yellow card) 85'	Stadium: MCH Arena; Attendance: 4,450; Referee: Jens Maae

9 May 2021 29	Brøndby IF	3–1	Midtjylland	Brøndbyvester
18:00 CEST	Uhre 37'; Radošević (yellow card) 57'; Hedlund 70' (Lindstrøm); Pavlović 83' (Slimane)	FCM Summary	Scholz 32' (pen.); Paulinho (red card) 40'	Stadium: Brøndby Stadium; Attendance: 8,158; Referee: Peter Kjærsgaard-Andersen

16 May 2021 30	Midtjylland	1–1	Randers	Herning
18:00 CEST	Sviatchenko (yellow card) 45+2'; Evander 80'	FCM Summary	Hammershøy-Mistrati 45+2' (pen.); Graves (yellow card) 53'; Egho (yellow card) 70'; Greve (yellow card) 72'; Kopplin (yellow card) 88'; Lauenborg (yellow card) 88'	Stadium: MCH Arena; Attendance: 4,450; Referee: Jakob Kehlet

19 May 2021 31	Copenhagen	4–2	Midtjylland	Copenhagen
21:00 CEST	Lerager 30' (Wind); Zeca (yellow card) 40'; Wilczek 44'; Wind 76' (pen.); Daramy 87' (Fischer); Falk (yellow card) 90'	FCM Summary	Kaba 34' (Evander); Scholz 40' (pen.); Brumado (yellow card) 72'; Cools (red card) 75'; Anderson (yellow card) 90+5'	Stadium: Telia Parken; Attendance: 10,927; Referee: Jørgen Daugbjerg Burchardt

24 May 2021 32	Midtjylland	4–0	AGF	Herning
17:00 CEST	Evander 18' (Andersson); Dreyer 45' (Onyeka) 73'; Sviatchenko 70' (Evander)	FCM Summary	Andersen (yellow card) 85'	Stadium: MCH Arena; Attendance: 4,450; Referee: Mads-Kristoffer Kristoffersen

=== Danish Cup ===
11 November 2020 Third Round	HB Køge	0–1	Midtjylland	Køge
16:30 CEST			Høegh 21'	Stadium: Capelli Sport Stadium

17 December 2020 Fourth Round	Copenhagen	0–1 (a.e.t.) (5−6 p)	Midtjylland	Copenhagen
20:15 CEST	Johnsson (yellow card) 1'; Stage (yellow card) 5' (goal) 9'; Zeca (yellow card) 104'	FCM Summary	Kaba 3' (pen.); Cajuste (yellow card) 13'; Onyeka (yellow card) 48'; Sviatchenko (yellow card) 83'; Cools (yellow card) 89'	Stadium: Telia Parken; Attendance: 266; Referee: Jørgen Daugbjerg Burchardt
	Penalties
	Wilczek (penalty scored); Pep Biel (penalty scored); Ankersen (penalty scored); Boilesen (penalty scored); Oviedo (penalty scored); Thomsen (penalty missed)		(penalty scored) Mabil; (penalty scored) Dreyer; (penalty scored) Andersson; (penalty scored) Sviatchenko; (penalty scored) Evander; (penalty scored) Paulinho

11 February 2021 Quarter-finals 1st leg	OB	1–2	Midtjylland	Odense
18:00 CEST	Opondo 32'; Hyllegaard (yellow card) 36'	FCM Summary	Isaksen (yellow card) 22' (goal) 50'; Pfeiffer 39' (Cools); Sery (yellow card) 84'	Stadium: Nature Energy Park; Attendance: 0 Referee: Sandi Putros

10 March 2020 Quarter-finals 2nd leg	Midtjylland	3–0 (5–1 agg.)	OB	Herning
16:30 CEST	Sery 45' (Scholz); Isaksen 49'; Onyeka (yellow card) 57'; Vibe 75'	FCM Summary	Okosun (yellow card) 42'; Frøkjær-Jensen (yellow card) 71'; Guðjohnsen (yellow card) 77'; Sabbi (yellow card) 85'	Stadium: MCH Arena; Attendance: 0 Referee: Peter Rasmussen

8 April 2020 Semi-finals 1st leg	Midtjylland	1–0	SønderjyskE	Herning
16:30 CEST	Kaba 49' (Evander)	FCM Summary	Vinderslev (yellow card) 34'; Holm (yellow card) 69'	Stadium: MCH Arena; Attendance: 0 Referee: Jens Maae\

15 April 2020 Semi-finals 2nd leg	SønderjyskE	3–1 (3–2 agg.)	Midtjylland	Haderslev
TBD CEST	Simonsen 49', 83'; Scholz 55' (o.g.); Banggaard (yellow card) 75'; Eskesen (yellow card) 87'	FCM Summary	Scholz (yellow card) 3'; Evander 86'	Stadium: Sydbank Park; Attendance: 0 Referee: Jakob Kehlet

=== UEFA Champions League ===
==== Qualifying round and Play-off round ====
26 August 2020 Second qualifying round	Ludogorets Razgrad (Bulgaria)	0–1	(Denmark) Midtjylland	Razgrad, Bulgaria
20:30 EEST	Abel (yellow card) 45'; Marín (yellow card) 81'; Moți (yellow card) 85'	FCM Summary	Kraev (yellow card) 7'; Onyeka (yellow card) 42'; Paulinho (yellow card) 62'; Brumado 78'	Stadium: Huvepharma Arena; Attendance: 0 Referee: (Ukraine) Denys Shurman

16 September 2020 Third qualifying round	Midtjylland (Denmark)	3–0	(Switzerland) BSC Young Boys	Herning
20:30 CEST	Kaba (yellow card) 31'; Onyeka (yellow card) 41'; Lefort 51' (o.g.); Dreyer 61' (Kaba); Sviatchenko (yellow card) 76'; Mabil 81'	FCM Summary	Aebischer (yellow card) 59'; Fassnacht (yellow card) 76'	Stadium: MCH Arena; Attendance: 0 Referee: (Bulgaria) Georgi Kabakov

22 September 2020 Play-off round 1st leg	Slavia Prague (Czech Republic)	0–0	(Denmark) Midtjylland	Prague, Czech Republic
21:00 CEST	Holeš (yellow card) 51'; Masopust (yellow card) 70'	FCM Summary	Paulinho (yellow card) 87'	Stadium: Sinobo Stadium; Attendance: 0 Referee: (Turkey) Cüneyt Çakır

30 September 2020 Play-off round 2nd leg	Midtjylland (Denmark)	4–1 (4–1 agg.)	(Czech Republic) Slavia Prague	Herning
21:00 CEST	Sviatchenko (yellow card) 56'; Kaba 65' (Mabil); Scholz 84' (pen.); Onyeka 88' (Dreyer); Dreyer 90+1' (Kraev), (yellow card) 90+1'		Olayinka 3'; Hovorka (yellow card) 53'; Bořil (yellow card) 81'	Stadium: MCH Arena; Attendance: 0 Referee: (Slovenia) Damir Skomina

==== Group stage ====
===== Group D =====
Pos	Team	Pld	W	D	L	GF	GA	GD	Pts	Qualification	LIV	ATA	AJX	MID
1	(England) Liverpool	6	4	1	1	10	3	+7	13	Advance to knockout phase	—	0–2	1–0	2–0
2	(Italy) Atalanta	6	3	2	1	10	8	+2	11	Advance to knockout phase	0–5	—	2–2	1–1
3	(Netherlands) Ajax	6	2	1	3	7	7	0	7	Transfer to Europa League	0–1	0–1	—	3–1
4	(Denmark) Midtjylland	6	0	2	4	4	13	−9	2		1–1	0–4	1–2	—

Source: UEFA

21 October 2020 1	Midtjylland (Denmark)	0–4	(Italy) Atalanta	Herning, Denmark
21:00	Sisto (yellow card) 74'	FCM Report	Zapata; Gómez 36' (Zapata); Muriel 42'; Romero (yellow card) 84'; Miranchuk 89' (Iličić)	Stadium: MCH Arena; Attendance: 132; Referee: (Portugal) Artur Soares Dias

27 October 2020 2	Liverpool (England)	2–0	(Denmark) Midtjylland	Liverpool, England
21:00	Milner (yellow card) 41'; Jota 55' (Alexander-Arnold); Salah 90+3' (pen.)	Report	Scholz (yellow card) 19'; Onyeka (yellow card) 25'; Cajuste (yellow card) 32'; Paulinho (yellow card) 90+1'	Stadium: Anfield; Attendance: 0 Referee: (Poland) Paweł Raczkowski

3 November 2020 3	Midtjylland (Denmark)	1–2	(Netherlands) Ajax	Herning, Denmark
21:00	Dreyer 18' (Cajuste); Vibe (yellow card) 84'	FCM Report	Antony 1' (Tadić); Tadić 13' (Promes); Schuurs (yellow card) 25'	Stadium: MCH Arena; Attendance: 132; Referee: (Scotland) Bobby Madden

25 November 2020 4	Ajax (Netherlands)	3–1	(Denmark) Midtjylland	Amsterdam, Netherlands
21:00	Neres (yellow card) 40' (goal) 66' (Traoré); Gravenberch 47' (Tadić); Mazraoui 49' (Tadić)	Report	Madsen (yellow card) 43'; Mabil 80' (pen.); Sviatchenko (red card) 90+1'	Stadium: Johan Cruyff Arena; Attendance: 0 Referee: (Russia) Sergei Karasev

1 December 2020 5	Atalanta (Italy)	1–1	(Denmark) Midtjylland	Bergamo, Italy
21:00	Djimsiti (yellow card) 30'; Romero (yellow card) 62' (goal) 79' (Hateboer)	Report	Scholz 13' (Kaba); Kaba (yellow card) 28'; Paulinho (yellow card) 89'	Stadium: Gewiss Stadium; Attendance: 0 Referee: (Greece) Anastasios Sidiropoulos

9 December 2020 6	Midtjylland (Denmark)	1–1	(England) Liverpool	Herning, Denmark
18:55	Onyeka (yellow card) 9'; Cools (yellow card) 31'; Scholz 62' (pen.); Anderson (yellow card) 81'	Report	Salah 1'; Kelleher (yellow card) 61'	Stadium: MCH Arena; Attendance: 0 Referee: (France) François Letexier

== Statistics ==
=== Appearances ===
As of 24 May 2021

Includes all competitive matches.

Rnk	Pos	No.	Player	Superliga	Danish Cup	UEFA Champions League	Total
1	MF	36	(Denmark) Anders Dreyer	31	4	10	45
1	DF	14	(Denmark) Alexander Scholz	31	4	10	45
3	MF	45	(Australia) Awer Mabil	29	4	10	43
4	FW	9	(Guinea) Sory Kaba	27	5	10	42
4	MF	7	(Denmark) Pione Sisto	29	4	9	42
6	28	DF	(Ukraine) Erik Sviatchenko	28	4	9	41
7	FW	38	(Nigeria) Frank Onyeka	27	4	9	40
8	MF	10	(Brazil) Evander	28	3	7	38
8	MF	34	(Iceland) Mikael Anderson	26	4	8	38
10	MF	40	(Sweden) Jens Cajuste	27	3	8	37
10	DF	29	(Brazil) Paulinho	25	2	10	37
12	FW	45	(Denmark) Gustav Isaksen	22	5	3	30
13	GK	1	(Denmark) Jesper Hansen	18	3	8	29
14	DF	29	(Belgium) Dion Cools	21	2	3	26
15	DF	6	(Sweden) Joel Andersson	13	3	9	25
16	MF	43	(Denmark) Nicolas Madsen	16	3	4	23
17	FW	33	(Germany) Luca Pfeiffer	12	2	3	17
17	FW	74	(Brazil) Júnior Brumado	12	2	3	17
19	MF	15	(Bulgaria) Bozhidar Kraev	9	0	7	16
20	GK	49	(Denmark) Jonas Lössl	12	2	0	14
21	FW	26	(Denmark) Lasse Vibe	7	2	3	12
21	DF	17	(Brazil) Ailton	8	4	0	12
23	DF	46	(Denmark) Japhet Sery Larsen	4	4	0	8
23	DF	5	(Denmark) Daniel Høegh	3	3	1	8
25	DF	25	(Canada) (Dominica) Manjrekar James	4	0	1	5
26	GK	31	(Denmark) Mikkel Andersen	2	0	2	4
27	DF	44	(Denmark) Nikolas Dyhr	3	0	0	3
28	FW	48	(Denmark) Mads Hansen	0	1	0	1
28	DF	55	(Denmark) Kristoffer Hansen	1	0	0	1
28	DF	18	(Denmark) Kristian Riis	1	0	0	1

=== Goalscorers ===
As of 24 May 2021

This includes all competitive matches.

Rnk	Pos	No.	Player	Superliga	Danish Cup	UEFA Champions League	Total
1	FW	9	(Guinea) Sory Kaba	11	2	1	14
2	MF	36	(Denmark) Anders Dreyer	8	0	3	11
3	DF	14	(Denmark) Alexander Scholz	7	0	3	10
4	MF	7	(Denmark) Pione Sisto	8	0	0	8
5	MF	10	(Brazil) Evander	6	1	0	7
6	MF	38	(Nigeria) Frank Onyeka	3	0	1	4
7	MF	11	(Australia) Awer Mabil	1	0	2	3
7	FW	45	(Denmark) Gustav Isaksen	1	2	0	3
7	FW	74	(Brazil) Júnior Brumado	2	0	1	3
7	DF	28	(Denmark) Erik Sviatchenko	3	0	0	3
11	FW	33	(Germany) Luca Pfeiffer	1	1	0	2
12	MF	15	(Bulgaria) Bozhidar Kraev	1	0	0	1
12	DF	5	(Denmark) Daniel Høegh	0	1	0	1
12	DF	2	(Belgium) Dion Cools	1	0	0	1
12	DF	46	(Denmark) Japhet Sery Larsen	0	1	0	1
12	FW	26	(Germany) Luca Pfeiffer	0	1	0	1
12	MF	40	(Sweden) Jens Cajuste	1	0	0	1
12	MF	34	(Iceland) Mikael Anderson	1	0	0	1
12	FW	26	(Denmark) Lasse Vibe	1	0	0	1
	O.G.		Opponent Own goal	1	0	1	2
TOTALS				57	9	12	78

=== Assists ===
As of 24 May 2021

This includes all competitive matches.

Rnk	Pos	No.	Player	Superliga	Danish Cup	UEFA Champions League	Total
1	MF	10	(Brazil) Evander	6	1	0	7
2	FW	9	(Guinea) Sory Kaba	4	0	2	6
2	MF	36	(Denmark) Anders Dreyer	5	0	1	6
4	DF	2	(Belgium) Dion Cools	2	1	0	3
4	DF	29	(Brazil) Paulinho	3	0	0	3
4	MF	11	(Australia) Awer Mabil	2	0	1	3
4	DF	28	(Denmark) Erik Sviatchenko	2	1	0	3
8	MF	40	(Sweden) Jens Cajuste	1	0	1	2
8	MF	38	(Nigeria) Frank Onyeka	2	0	0	2
10	DF	44	(Denmark) Nikolas Dyhr	1	0	0	1
10	MF	15	(Bulgaria) Bozhidar Kraev	0	0	1	1
10	FW	74	(Brazil) Júnior Brumado	1	0	0	1
10	DF	28	(Denmark) Erik Sviatchenko	1	0	0	1
10	MF	7	(Denmark) (South Sudan) Pione Sisto	1	0	0	1
10	MF	45	(Denmark) Gustav Isaksen	1	0	0	1
10	MF	34	(Iceland) Mikael Anderson	1	0	0	1
10	DF	6	(Sweden) Joel Andersson	1	0	0	1
TOTALS				34	3	6	43

=== Clean sheets ===
As of 24 May 2021

This includes all competitive matches.

Rnk	Pos	No.	Player	Superliga	Danish Cup	UEFA Champions League	Total
1	GK	1	(Denmark) Jesper Hansen	8	2	3	13
2	GK	46	(Denmark) Jonas Lössl	6	1	0	7
TOTALS				14	3	3	20

=== Disciplinary record ===
As of 24 May 2021

This includes all competitive matches.

Rnk	Pos.	No.	Player	Superliga		Danish Cup		UEFA Europa League		Total	
Rnk	Pos.	No.	Player	Yellow card	Red card	Yellow card	Red card	Yellow card	Red card	Yellow card	Red card
1	DF	29	(Brazil) Paulinho	6	2	0	0	4	0	10	2
2	FW	38	(Nigeria) Frank Onyeka	5	1	1	0	4	0	10	1
3	DF	28	(Denmark) Erik Sviatchenko	5	0	1	0	2	1	8	1
4	MF	40	(Sweden) Jens Cajuste	7	0	1	0	1	0	8	0
5	MF	2	(Belgium) Dion Cools	4	1	1	0	1	0	6	1
6	DF	14	(Denmark) Alexander Scholz	4	0	1	0	1	0	6	0
6	FW	9	(Guinea) Sory Kaba	4	0	0	0	2	0	6	0
8	FW	45	(Denmark) Gustav Isaksen	3	1	1	0	0	0	4	1
9	MF	10	(Brazil) Evander	4	0	0	0	0	0	4	0
10	MF	43	(Denmark) Nicolas Madsen	1	1	0	0	1	0	2	1
10	FW	74	(Brazil) Júnior Brumado	3	0	0	0	0	0	3	0
10	MF	34	(Iceland) Mikael Anderson	2	0	0	0	1	0	3	0
13	MF	15	(Bulgaria) Bozhidar Kraev	1	0	0	0	1	0	2	0
13	DF	46	(Denmark) Japhet Sery Larsen	1	0	1	0	0	0	2	0
13	MF	36	(Denmark) Anders Dreyer	1	0	0	0	1	0	2	0
13	GK	49	(Denmark) Jonas Lössl	2	0	0	0	0	0	2	0
17	MF	7	(Denmark) Pione Sisto	0	0	0	0	1	0	1	0
17	DF	25	(Canada) (Dominica) Manjrekar James	1	0	0	0	0	0	1	0
17	FW	26	(Denmark) Lasse Vibe	0	0	0	0	1	0	1	0
17	MF	11	(Australia) Awer Mabil	1	0	0	0	0	0	1	0
17	DF	17	(Brazil) Ailton	1	0	0	0	0	0	1	0
17	DF	5	(Denmark) Daniel Høegh	1	0	0	0	0	0	1	0
TOTALS				57	6	7	0	21	1	85	7
