= List of Danish football transfers winter 2021–22 =

This is a list of Danish football transfers for the 2021–22 winter transfer window. Only transfers featuring Danish Superliga are listed.

== Danish Superliga ==
Note: Flags indicate national team as has been defined under FIFA eligibility rules. Players may hold more than one non-FIFA nationality.

=== Brøndby ===
In:

No.	Pos.	Nation	Player
6	MF	NZL	Joe Bell (from (Norway) Viking FK)
12	FW	SWE	Carl Björk (from (Sweden) Norrköping)
19	DF	DEN	Frederik Alves (from (England) West Ham United, previously on loan at (England) Sunderland)

Out:

No.	Pos.	Nation	Player
2	DF	DEN	Jens Martin Gammelby (on loan to (Poland) Miedź Legnica)
11	FW	DEN	Mikael Uhre (to (United States) Philadelphia Union)
12	DF	DEN	Michael Lumb (to Fremad Amager)
19	MF	DEN	Morten Frendrup (to (Italy) Genoa)
28	DF	DEN	Anton Skipper (to (Norway) Sarpsborg 08)
34	MF	DEN	Andreas Pyndt (on loan to B93)
42	MF	NOR	Tobias Børkeeiet (to (Norway) Rosenborg)

=== Midtjylland ===
In:

No.	Pos.	Nation	Player
8	MF	GER	Max Meyer (on loan from (Turkey) Fenerbahçe)
17	DF	DEN	Mads Døhr Thychosen (from Nordsjælland)
18	MF	ZAM	Edward Chilufya (from (Sweden) Djurgården)
19	FW	BRA	Vágner Love (from (Kazakhstan) Kairat Almaty)
26	DF	COL	Pablo Ortíz (on loan from (Colombia) América)
31	GK	DEN	David Ousted (free agent)

Out:

No.	Pos.	Nation	Player
1	GK	DEN	Jonas Lössl (on loan to (England) Brentford)
2	DF	MAS	Dion Cools (on loan to (Belgium) Zulte Waregem)
11	FW	AUS	Awer Mabil (on loan to (Turkey) Kasımpaşa)
40	MF	SWE	Jens Cajuste (to (France) Reims)
48	FW	DEN	Mads Hansen (to Nordsjælland)
—	MF	CYP	Antonis Martis (to (Cyprus) AEK Larnaca, previously on loan at (Australia) Macarthur)

=== Copenhagen ===
In:

No.	Pos.	Nation	Player
3	DF	SVK	Denis Vavro (on loan from (Italy) Lazio)
9	FW	DEN	Nicolai Jørgensen (from (Turkey) Kasımpaşa)
11	FW	SEN	Khouma Babacar (from (Italy) Sassuolo, previously on loan at (Turkey) Alanyaspor)
17	FW	NGA	Paul Mukairu (from (Turkey) Antalyaspor)
23	FW	NGA	Akinkunmi Amoo (from (Sweden) Hammarby)
29	FW	FRA	Mamoudou Karamoko (from (Austria) LASK)

Out:

No.	Pos.	Nation	Player
3	DF	SWE	Pierre Bengtsson (to (Sweden) Djurgården)
4	DF	NOR	Ruben Gabrielsen (loan return to (France) Toulouse)
9	FW	POL	Kamil Wilczek (to (Poland) Piast Gliwice)
23	FW	DEN	Jonas Wind (to (Germany) VfL Wolfsburg)
28	FW	DEN	Rasmus Højlund (to (Austria) Sturm Graz)
—	MF	CRO	Robert Mudražija (on loan to (Slovenia) Olimpija Ljubljana, previously on loan at (Croatia) Rijeka)

=== AGF ===
In:

No.	Pos.	Nation	Player
25	FW	DEN	Eskild Dall (on loan from (Netherlands) Jong Ajax)

Out:

No.	Pos.	Nation	Player
—	DF	DEN	Mikkel Lassen (to Horsens, previously on loan)
—	MF	DEN	Magnus Anbo (retired, previously on loan at (Iceland) Stjarnan)

=== Nordsjælland ===
In:

No.	Pos.	Nation	Player
9	FW	SWE	Benjamin Nygren (from (Belgium) Genk, previously on loan at (Netherlands) Heerenveen)
13	GK	DEN	Andreas Hansen (on loan from AaB)
15	DF	DEN	Erik Marxen (from Randers)
18	MF	DEN	Mads Bidstrup (on loan from (England) Brentford)
36	MF	FRA	Rocco Ascone (on loan from (France) Lille)
37	FW	GHA	Ernest Nuamah (from (Ghana) Right to Dream)
48	FW	DEN	Mads Hansen (from Midtjylland)

Out:

No.	Pos.	Nation	Player
2	DF	DEN	Mads Døhr Thychosen (to Midtjylland)
19	MF	DEN	Oliver Rimmen (on loan to FA 2000)
21	FW	DEN	Emeka Nnamani (on loan to Nykøbing)
34	MF	SWE	Jesper Dickman (to (Sweden) Värnamo)
38	DF	GHA	Clinton Antwi (to (Finland) KuPS)

=== Randers ===
In:

No.	Pos.	Nation	Player
3	DF	SWE	Mattias Andersson (from (Switzerland) Sion)
5	DF	SWE	Hugo Andersson (from (Sweden) Malmö)
22	GK	DEN	Alexander Nybo (from Fredericia)

Out:

No.	Pos.	Nation	Player
11	DF	DEN	Erik Marxen (to Nordsjælland)
21	FW	DEN	Karl Leth (to (Faroe Islands) Argja Bóltfelag)
24	MF	NIG	Issah Salou (to Skive)
51	GK	DEN	Andreas Søndergaard (loan return to (England) Wolves)

=== AaB ===
In:

No.	Pos.	Nation	Player
39	FW	DEN	Kasper Høgh (from Hobro)

Out:

No.	Pos.	Nation	Player
7	FW	MKD	Aleksandar Trajkovski (loan return to (Spain) Mallorca)
11	FW	SWE	Tim Prica (on loan to (Austria) WSG Tirol)
22	GK	DEN	Andreas Hansen (on loan to Nordsjælland)
35	MF	DEN	Marcus Hannesbo (on loan to Fredericia)

=== SønderjyskE ===
In:

No.	Pos.	Nation	Player
10	MF	DEN	Nicolaj Thomsen (from (Norway) Vålerenga)
11	FW	DEN	Emil Berggreen (from (Germany) Greuther Fürth)
15	MF	USA	Jose Gallegos (from (United States) San Antonio)
21	DF	ISL	Atli Barkarson (from (Iceland) Víkingur Reykjavik)
35	GK	DEN	Benjamin Schubert (from Jammerbugt)

Out:

No.	Pos.	Nation	Player
6	DF	DEN	Søren Reese (loan return to Midtjylland)
21	DF	HAI	Jeppe Simonsen (to (Poland) Podbeskidzie)
23	MF	DEN	Mads Hansen (on loan to Kolding)
29	MF	CMR	Victor Mpindi (on loan to (Sweden) Örebro)

=== OB ===
In:

No.	Pos.	Nation	Player
22	DF	SRB	Mihajlo Ivančević (from (Serbia) Spartak Subotica)
25	DF	AUS	Joel King (from (Australia) Sydney)

Out:

No.	Pos.	Nation	Player
9	FW	NED	Mart Lieder (to (Netherlands) Emmen)
22	DF	DEN	Daniel Obbekjær (to (Canada) York United)
25	MF	UGA	Moses Opondo (on loan to Horsens)

=== Vejle ===
In:

No.	Pos.	Nation	Player
3	DF	CHI	Miiko Albornoz (from (Chile) Colo-Colo)
6	DF	ESP	Raúl Albentosa (free agent)
12	FW	DEN	Marius Elvius (from Køge)
15	MF	GHA	Ebenezer Ofori (on loan from (Sweden) AIK)
30	FW	ARM	Edgar Babayan (from (Cyprus) Pafos)
32	GK	SWE	Lucas Hägg-Johansson (from (Sweden) Kalmar)

Out:

No.	Pos.	Nation	Player
3	DF	FRO	Viljormur Davidsen (to (Sweden) Helsingborg)
6	MF	IRN	Saeid Ezatolahi (on loan to (Qatar) Al-Gharafa)
8	MF	DEN	Lukas Engel (on loan to Silkeborg)
13	GK	NOR	Sten Grytebust (loan return to Copenhagen)
15	MF	FRO	Hallur Hansson (to (Iceland) KR Reykjavík)
20	MF	DEN	Jacob Schoop (to Helsingør)
21	GK	RUS	Aleksey Chernov (free agent)
35	MF	RUS	Ivan Repyakh (to (Russia) SKA Rostov)
37	DF	DEN	Mathias Voss (to (Faroe Islands) 07 Vestur)

=== Viborg ===
In:

No.	Pos.	Nation	Player
9	FW	SWE	Marokhy Ndione (from (Sweden) Elfsborg)
19	MF	CZE	Jan Žambůrek (from (England) Brentford)
26	DF	SUI	Nicolas Bürgy (on loan from (Switzerland) Young Boys)

Out:

No.	Pos.	Nation	Player
9	FW	DEN	Sebastian Grønning (to (South Korea) Suwon Bluewings)
10	MF	DEN	Jeff Mensah (retired)
15	MF	DEN	Mads Aaquist (to Fremad Amager)
18	DF	NED	Kellian van der Kaap (to (Bulgaria) Levski Sofia)

=== Silkeborg ===
In:

No.	Pos.	Nation	Player
29	MF	DEN	Lukas Engel (on loan from Vejle)

Out:

No.	Pos.	Nation	Player
1	GK	DEN	Oscar Hedvall (on loan to Fredericia)
19	FW	DEN	Gustav Marcussen (to Fremad Amager)

== See also ==
- 2021–22 Danish Superliga
