= Bassala Sambou =

German footballer (born 1997)

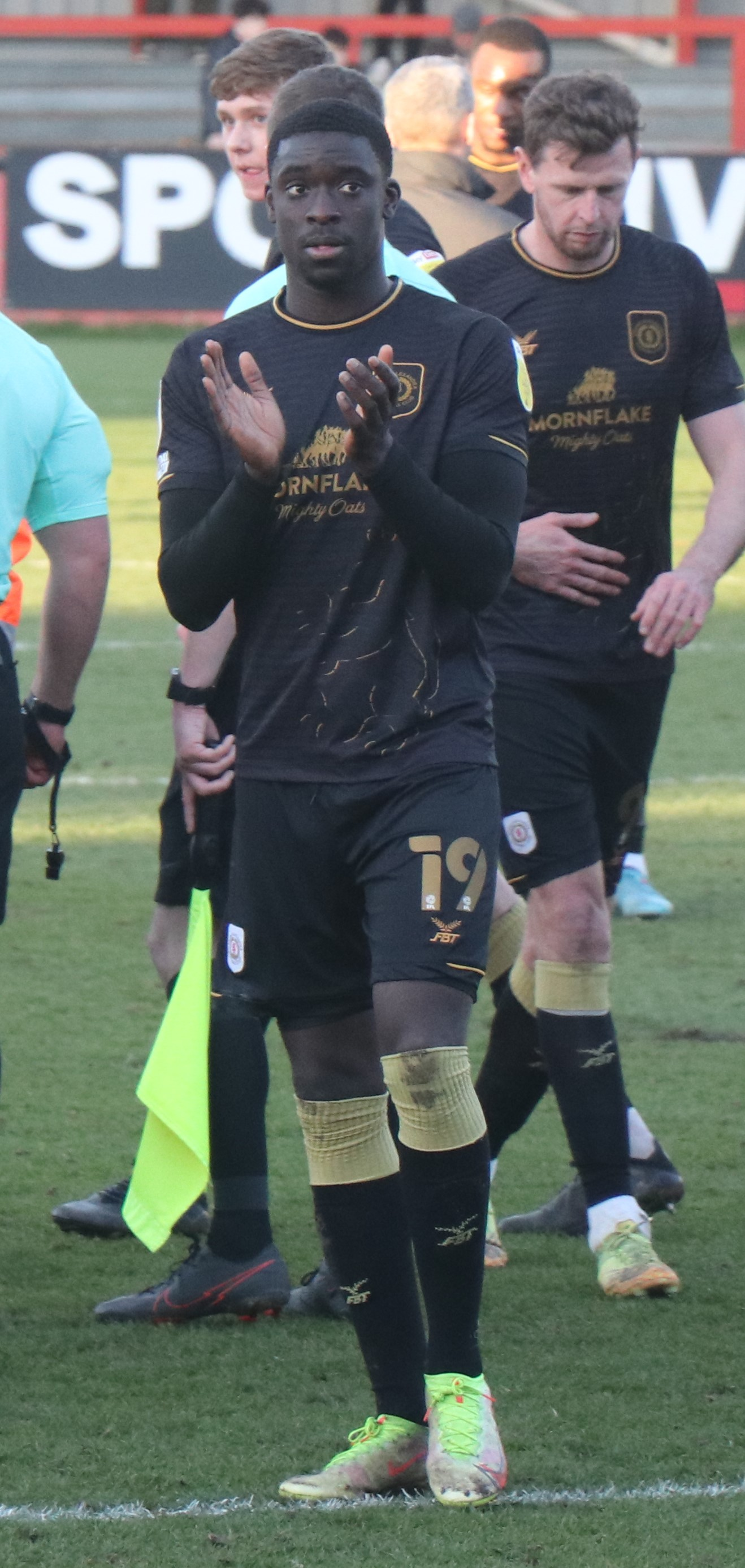
- Bassala Sambou (February 2022)

Personal information
- Full name: Bassala Sambou
- Date of birth: 15 October 1997 (age 29)
- Place of birth: Hannover, Germany
- Height: 1.84 m (6 ft 0 in)
- Position: Striker

Team information
- Current team: Neftçi
- Number: 97

Youth career
- 2011–2016: Coventry City
- 2016–2019: Everton

Senior career*
Years	Team	Apps	(Gls)
2019–2022	Fortuna Sittard	33	(2)
2020–2021	→ Randers (loan)	23	(1)
2022–2023	Crewe Alexandra	43	(2)
2023	→ Oldham Athletic (loan)	9	(2)
2023–2025	Enosis Neon Paralimni	46	(5)
2025–	Neftçi	40	(14)
- * Club domestic league appearances and goals as of 31 May 2026

Bassala Sambou (born 15 October 1997) is an English footballer who plays as a striker for Neftçi in Azerbaijan Premier League.

== Career ==
Sambou was born in Hannover, to Senegalese parents but moved to London aged seven with his family.

=== Coventry City ===
Sambou played Sunday League football before joining Coventry City as a 15-year-old. He progressed through the youth team and was among six players to be signed for the club from the academy as part of an apprenticeship.

Sambou made his professional debut as a substitute for Coventry City on November 7th, 2015 in a 2–1 FA Cup first round loss to Northampton Town at the Ricoh Arena, coming on to replace Conor Thomas after 58 minutes. During his final season with Coventry, he scored 25 goals across the under-18s and under-21s teams.

=== Everton ===
On June 3rd, 2016 Sambou signed for side Everton on a three-year deal, being assigned to the under-23 team managed by David Unsworth. Sambou was previously offered a professional contract with Coventry City in February.

=== Fortuna Sittard ===
On July 23rd, 2019, after turning down a new deal with Everton, Sambou joined Eredivisie side Fortuna Sittard on a three-year deal.

On October 5th, 2020, Sambou was loaned out to Danish Superliga club Randers FC for the 2020–21 season with an option to buy.

=== Crewe Alexandra ===
On January 27th, 2022, Sambou signed an 18-month deal to join EFL League One side Crewe Alexandra, making his debut two days later, coming on as a 75th minute substitute for Oliver Finney in a home defeat by Rotherham United. He scored his first Crewe goal in a 2–1 defeat at Milton Keynes Dons on 5 April 2022.

Early the following season, Sambou was sent off after grabbing Theo Vassell by the throat during an off-the-ball incident in the 31st minute of Crewe's 3–0 League Two defeat at Salford City on 13 August 2022. He apologised for his actions after the game, but faced an automatic three-match suspension plus further disciplinary action by Crewe manager Alex Morris.

=== Oldham Athletic ===
On 17 March 2023, Sambou signed for National League club Oldham Athletic on loan until the end of the season (Sambou had played for Oldham manager David Unsworth at the Everton academy). Sambou scored his first goal for Oldham in a 2–2 draw against Altrincham on 7 April 2023.

Following his return to Crewe, discussions about his future with the club were said to be "ongoing" on 15 May 2023. He left Crewe by mutual consent in June 2023.

=== Neftçi ===
On February 8, 2025, Sambou moved from Enosis Neon Paralimni FC to Neftçi on a fee of €100 thousand and signed a 1.5 year contract.

== Career statistics ==
As of match played February 1, 2026

Appearances and goals by club, season and competition
Club	Season	League			National Cup		League Cup		Total	
Club	Season	Division	Apps	Goals	Apps	Goals	Apps	Goals	Apps	Goals
Coventry City	2015–16	League One	0	0	1	0	0	0	1	0
Fortuna Sittard	2019–20	Eredivisie	22	2	3	1	0	0	25	3
Fortuna Sittard	2020–21	Eredivisie	3	0	0	0	0	0	3	0
Fortuna Sittard	2021–22	Eredivisie	8	0	2	0	0	0	10	0
Fortuna Sittard	Total		33	2	5	1	0	0	38	3
Randers FC (loan)	2020–21	Danish Superliga	23	1	5	3	0	0	28	4
Crewe Alexandra	2021–22	League One	16	2	0	0	0	0	16	2
Crewe Alexandra	2022–23	League Two	27	0	2	1	4	0	33	1
Crewe Alexandra	Total		43	2	2	1	4	0	49	3
Oldham Athletic (loan)	2022–23	National League	9	2	0	0	0	0	9	2
Enosis Neon	2023-24	Cypriot Second Division	28	2	1	0	0	0	29	2
Enosis Neon	2024-25	Cypriot First Division	18	3	3	2	0	0	21	5
Enosis Neon	Total		46	5	4	2	0	0	50	7
Neftçi Baku	2024–25	Azerbaijan Premier League	13	3	1	1	0	0	14	4
Neftçi Baku	2025–26	Azerbaijan Premier League	18	7	2	0	0	0	20	7
Neftçi Baku	Total		31	10	3	1	0	0	34	11
Career total			185	22	20	8	4	0	209	30

== Honours ==
Everton U23

- Premier League 2: 2016–17, 2018–19
- Premier League Cup: 2018–19

Randers

- Danish Cup: 2020–21
