= Lasse Berg Johnsen =

Norwegian footballer (born 1999)

Personal information
- Date of birth: 18 August 1999 (age 27)
- Place of birth: Stavanger, Norway
- Height: 1.79 m (5 ft 10 in)
- Position: Midfielder

Team information
- Current team: Sporting Kansas City
- Number: 4

Youth career
- –2012: Forus & Gausel
- 2013–2018: Viking

Senior career*
Years	Team	Apps	(Gls)
2019	Viking	2	(0)
2019	→ Tromsdalen (loan)	22	(1)
2020	Raufoss	29	(0)
2021–2023	Randers	79	(4)
2023–2026	Malmö FF	63	(5)
2026–	Sporting Kansas City	6	(1)

International career^{‡}
2024–	Norway	3	(0)
- * Club domestic league appearances and goals as of 25 April 2026 ‡ National team caps and goals as of 10 June 2025

Lasse Berg Johnsen (né Lasse Egeland; born 18 August 1999) is a Norwegian professional footballer who plays as a central midfielder for Sporting Kansas City and the Norway national team.

== Club career ==
On 28 November 2018, Berg Johnsen signed a professional contract with Viking FK. He made his senior league debut for the club in a 2–1 win against Brann on 13 April 2019, coming on as a substitute. On 29 May 2019, he was loaned out to 1. divisjon club Tromsdalen. Berg Johnsen's contract with Viking expired at the end of the 2019 season.

On 23 January 2020, he signed a two-year contract with 1. divisjon club Raufoss. One year later, on 1 February 2021, he joined Danish Superliga club Randers.

On 13 July 2023, Berg Johnsen signed a four-and-a-half-year contract with Allsvenskan club Malmö FF.

On 18 February 2026, Berg Johnsen signed a two-and-a-half-year contract with Major League Soccer club Sporting Kansas City.

== International career ==
Berg Johnsen made his Norway national team debut on 14 November 2024 in a Nations League game against Slovenia. He started the game and played 60 minutes, as Norway won 4–1.

== Personal life ==
In 2019 he changed his last name from Egeland to Berg Johnsen.

== Career statistics ==
=== Club ===
As of match played 29 January 2026

Appearances and goals by club, season and competition
Club	Season	League			Cup		Continental		Other		Total	
Club	Season	Division	Apps	Goals	Apps	Goals	Apps	Goals	Apps	Goals	Apps	Goals
Viking	2019	Eliteserien	2	0	1	0	—		—		3	0
Tromsdalen (loan)	2019	1. divisjon	22	1	1	0	—		—		23	1
Raufoss	2020	1. divisjon	29	0	—		—		1 (Note: Appearance in Eliteserien play-offs)	0	30	0
Randers	2020–21	Danish Superliga	16	1	4	0	—		—		20	1
Randers	2021–22	Danish Superliga	31	2	3	0	10 (Note: Two appearances in UEFA Europa League, eight appearances in UEFA Europa Conference League)	0	—		44	2
Randers	2022–23	Danish Superliga	32	1	2	0	—		—		34	1
Randers	Total		79	4	9	0	10	0	—		98	4
Malmö FF	2023	Allsvenskan	13	0	0	0	—		—		13	0
Malmö FF	2024	Allsvenskan	28	2	6	1	12 (Note: Six appearances in UEFA Champions League, six appearances in UEFA Europa League)	2	—		44	5
Malmö FF	2025	Allsvenskan	22	3	7	1	14 (Note: Six appearances and one goal in UEFA Champions League, eight appearances and one goal in UEFA Europa League)	2	—		43	6
Malmö FF	2026	Allsvenskan	0	0	0	0	2 (Note: Appearances in UEFA Europa League)	0	—		2	0
Malmö FF	Total		63	5	13	2	28	4	—		104	11
Career total			195	10	24	2	38	2	1	0	258	14

=== International ===
As of match played 9 June 2025

Appearances and goals by national team and year
National team	Year	Apps	Goals
Norway	2024	1	0
Norway	2025	2	0
Total		3	0

== Honours ==
Viking

- Norwegian Football Cup: 2019

Randers

- Danish Cup: 2020–21

Malmö FF

- Allsvenskan: 2023, 2024
- Svenska Cupen: 2023–24
