= Tobias Klysner =

Danish footballer (born 2001)

Personal information
- Full name: Tobias Klysner Breuner
- Date of birth: 3 July 2001 (age 25)
- Place of birth: Randers, Denmark
- Height: 1.83 m (6 ft 0 in)
- Position: Winger

Team information
- Current team: Sønderjyske
- Number: 20

Youth career
- Randers
- Hornbæk SF
- Randers

Senior career*
Years	Team	Apps	(Gls)
2019–2024	Randers	99	(3)
2023	→ Aalesund II (loan)	2	(0)
2023	→ Aalesund (loan)	1	(0)
2024–	Sønderjyske	51	(1)

International career
2017	Denmark U-16	3	(0)
- * Club domestic league appearances and goals as of 19 May 2026

Tobias Klysner Breuner (born 3 July 2001) is a Danish professional footballer who plays as a winger for Danish Superliga club Sønderjyske.

== Club career ==
=== Randers FC ===
Klysner started playing football at Randers FC, before moving to Randers' cooperative club, Hornbæk SF. However, he later returned to Randers again and signed a three-year youth contract with the club on his 15th birthday.

On 14 April 2019, Klysner made his professional debut for Randers, in a Danish Superliga match against Hobro IK. Klysner started on the bench, but replaced Mikkel Kallesøe in the 91st minute, contributing to a 2–1 win. He was called up for four more games season, however as an unused substitute. Randers confirmed on 11 June 2019, that Klysner had signed a professional four-year contract with the club and was permanently promoted to the first team squad.

Klysner scored his first professional goal on 30 October 2020, in a league game against Vejle Boldklub. After coming off the bench for Tosin Kehinde he scored only a few minutes later to help Randers to a 3–0 away win. In January 2021, 19-year old Klysner once again, signed a new deal with Randers, this time until June 2024. He won his first trophy at the end of the season, as Randers beat SønderjyskE by 4–0 in the final.

==== Loan to Aalesund ====
On 1 September 2023, Klysner joined Norwegian Eliteserien side Aalesund on a loan deal for the rest of 2023, with a purchase option included. Klysner had barely landed in Norway before he got injured, and therefore didn't get more than three minutes of playing time in Aalesund before returning to OB at the turn of the year.

=== Sønderjyske ===
On 25 January 2024, Klysner joined Danish 1st Division leaders Sønderjyske on a three-year contract.

== Honours ==
Randers

- Danish Cup: 2020–21
