= Vito Hammershøy-Mistrati =

Danish footballer (born 1992)

Personal information
- Date of birth: 15 June 1992 (age 34)
- Place of birth: Copenhagen, Denmark
- Height: 1.77 m (5 ft 10 in)
- Position: Midfielder

Team information
- Current team: B.93
- Number: 30

Youth career
- B.93
- –2007: KB
- 2007–2011: Midtjylland

Senior career*
Years	Team	Apps	(Gls)
2011–2012	Næstved	17	(3)
2012–2014	HB Køge	58	(5)
2014–2016	Lyngby	29	(1)
2016–2017	Helsingør	43	(5)
2017–2019	Hobro	63	(3)
2019–2022	Randers	94	(24)
2022–2023	CFR Cluj	5	(1)
2023–2024	IFK Norrköping	48	(10)
2025–	B.93	44	(3)
- * Club domestic league appearances and goals as of 3 October 2026

Vito Hammershøy-Mistrati (born 15 June 1992) is a Danish professional footballer who plays as a midfielder for Danish 2nd Division club B.93.

== Career ==
Hammershøy-Mistrati progressed through FC Midtjylland's academy after joining from KB in 2007, but did not make his breakthrough into the first team. He joined Næstved in 2011 where he began his professional career. In the June 2012, he moved to HB Køge.

On 24 July 2014, Hammershøy-Mistrati signed a one-year contract with Lyngby. This contract was extended in December until 2017. In February 2016, his contract with Lyngby Boldklub was terminated by mutual consent. A few days later, it was announced that he was moving to FC Helsingør. His contract was extended in July of the same year, where he signed a one-year extension keeping him at Helsingør until 2017.

In July 2017, he joined Danish Superliga club Hobro IK. He made his debut at the top level on 16 July 2017, starting against his former side Helsingør on the first matchday of the 2017–18 season, as Hobro won 2–1. On 10 December, he stood out in the league match against FC Nordsjælland, providing two assists for Quincy Antipas in a 3–2 loss.

Hammershøy-Mistrati joined Randers FC on 6 July 2019, signing a four-year contract. He made his debut for the club on 14 July, the first matchday of the 2019–20 season, starting in a 2–1 loss to SønderjyskE. He won his first trophy at the end of the 2020–21 season, as Randers beat SønderjyskE by 4–0 in the Danish Cup final. In the game, he provided an assist to Simon Piesinger. In January 2022, he was named team captain after Erik Marxen's departure to Nordsjælland.

On 8 June 2022, Hammershøy-Mistrati joined Romanian champions CFR Cluj, ending his spell at Randers. His stay in Romania proved brief, and after six months he left the club to sign a contract running to the end of 2025 with Swedish Allsvenskan side IFK Norrköping.

On 30 January 2025, it was announced that Hammershøy-Mistrati had rejoined his formative club B.93, then competing in the Danish 1st Division, on a contract lasting until June 2027.

== Personal life ==
Hammershøy-Mistrati was born in Denmark to parents of Danish and Italian heritage. He is the son of journalist Miki Mistrati.

== Honours ==
Randers

- Danish Cup: 2020–21

CFR Cluj

- Supercupa României runner-up: 2022
