= Nikola Mileusnic =

Australian soccer player

Nikola Mileusnić
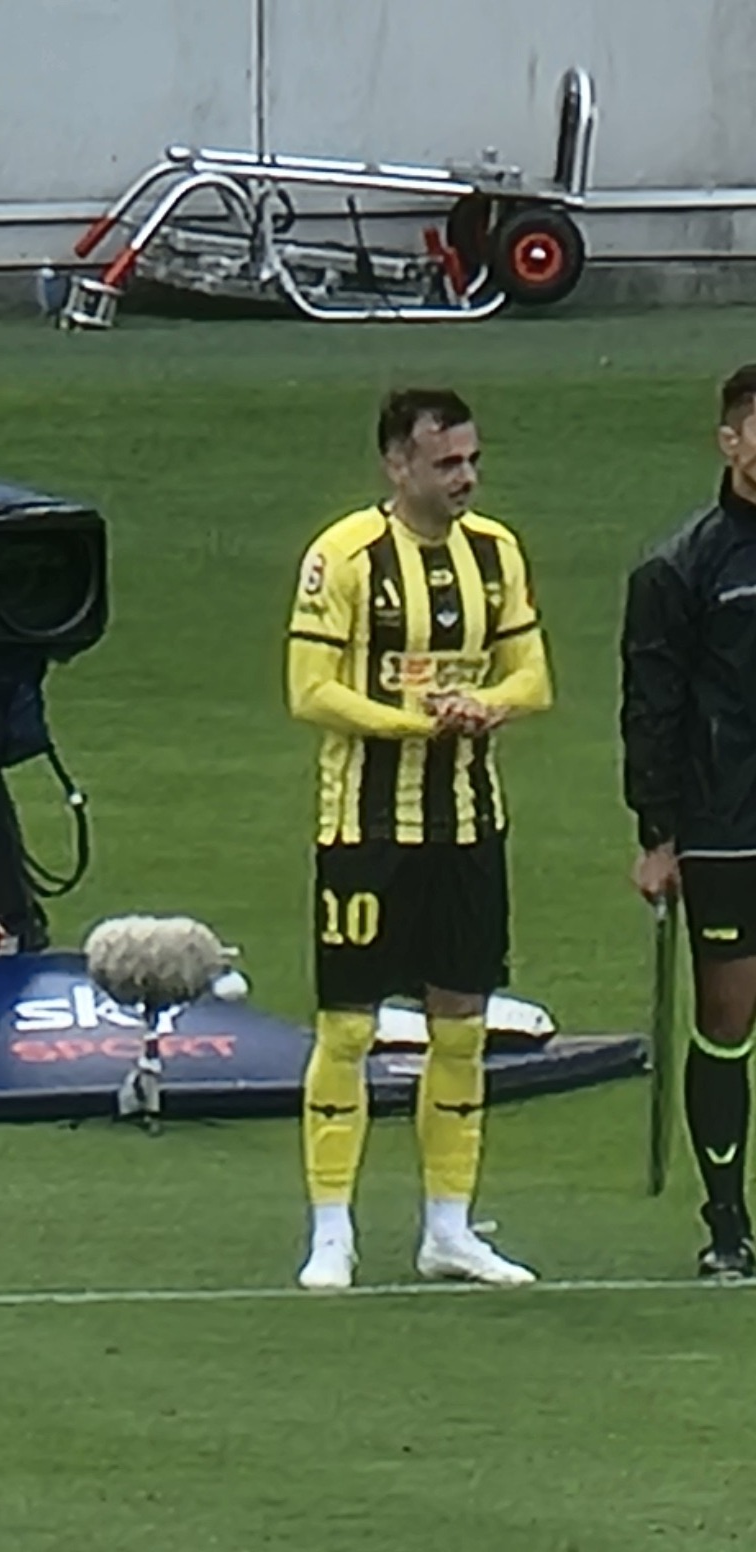
- Mileusnic playing for the Wellington Phoenix in 2026.

Personal information
- Full name: Nikola Mileusnić
- Date of birth: 17 July 1993 (age 33)
- Place of birth: Adelaide, Australia
- Height: 1.80 m (5 ft 11 in)
- Position: Winger

Youth career
- White City
- Western Strikers
- West Torrens Birkalla
- 2012–2014: Adelaide United

Senior career*
Years	Team	Apps	(Gls)
2011–2015	White City	82	(24)
2016	Adelaide City	25	(16)
2016–2020	Adelaide United	86	(14)
2020–2021	Randers	16	(0)
2021–2024	Brisbane Roar	62	(12)
2024–2025	Perth Glory	14	(0)
2025–2026	Wellington Phoenix	7	(0)
- * Club domestic league appearances and goals as of 17 April 2026

Nikola Mileusnić (Serbian Cyrillic: Никола Милеуснић, pronounced [nǐkola mileǔsɲitɕ]; born 17 July 1993) is an Australian soccer player who most recently played as a winger for A-League Men club Wellington Phoenix. He previously played for Danish Superliga club Randers as well as A-League Men clubs Adelaide United, Brisbane Roar, and Perth Glory. In 2018, he was considered one of the fastest players in the world, having exceeded 36 km/h in games.

== Career ==
=== Adelaide United ===
Mileusnic made his professional football debut for A-League side Adelaide United in a 1-1 draw against the Brisbane Roar on 11 November 2016, coming off the bench in the 65th minute. He scored in the 2017 FFA Cup Final against Sydney FC, in which the Reds lost 2–1 in extra time. He played in Adelaide's FFA Cup final wins in 2018 and 2019, scoring in the 2019 final.

=== Randers FC ===
On 5 October 2020, Mileusnic joined Danish Superliga club Randers on a deal for the 2020–21 season and became a regular starter in both the League and Cup. He played in the 2021 Danish Cup final victory over SønderjyskE and featured throughout the campaign, including scoring in the quarter-final against Vejle. Following the conclusion of the season, Randers announced they would not extend Mileusnic's contract, Mileusnic then returned to Australia.

=== Brisbane Roar ===
On 21 June 2021, it was confirmed he had signed for Brisbane Roar ahead of the 2021-22 A-League season.

=== Perth Glory ===
Perth Glory revealed the signing of Mileusnic on 17 July 2024. Mileusnic made 14 appearances in the league and one in the Australia Cup, before his contract ended on 30 June 2025.

=== Wellington Phoenix ===
On 13 August 2025, the Wellington Phoenix announced the signing of Mileusnic on a 1-year contract. On 11 January 2026, Mileusnic made his debut for the club in a 2–2 draw at home to Adelaide United.

On 29 May 2026, the club confirmed Mileusnic's departure.

== Personal life ==
Mileusnic holds a Master's degree in Petroleum Engineering.

== Honours ==
=== Club ===
Adelaide United

- FFA Cup: 2018, 2019

Randers

- Danish Cup: 2020–21
