= Simon Piesinger =

Austrian footballer

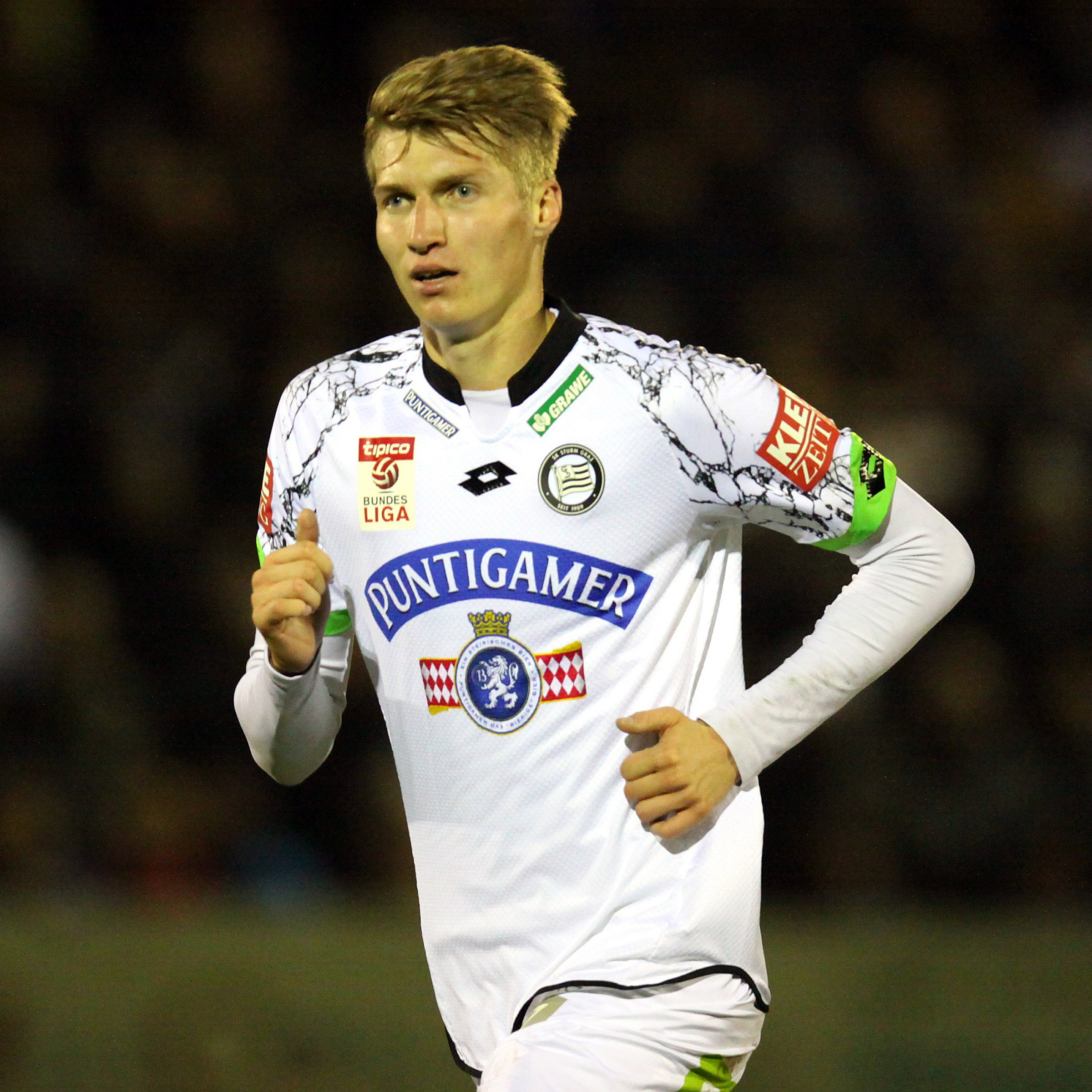
- Piesinger in 2015

Personal information
- Date of birth: 13 May 1992 (age 34)
- Place of birth: Linz, Austria
- Height: 1.96 m (6 ft 5 in)
- Positions: Centre-back; defensive midfielder

Team information
- Current team: Wolfsberger AC
- Number: 8

Youth career
- 1998–2006: SK St. Magdalena
- 2006–2010: LASK

Senior career*
Years	Team	Apps	(Gls)
2010–2011	LASK (A)	21	(1)
2011–2012	Blau-Weiß Linz	28	(0)
2012–2014	Wacker Innsbruck	43	(1)
2013–2014	Wacker Innsbruck II	5	(0)
2014–2017	Sturm Graz	60	(11)
2017–2019	Rheindorf Altach	34	(2)
2019–2022	Randers	84	(4)
2022–	Wolfsberger AC	105	(7)

International career
2012–2014	Austria U21	11	(1)
- * Club domestic league appearances and goals as of 10 June 2026

Simon Piesinger (born 13 May 1992) is an Austrian professional footballer who plays as a centre-back for Austrian Bundesliga club Wolfsberger AC.

== Club career ==
Piesinger, whose father is former professional footballer Gerald Piesinger, started playing football with his twin brother Markus at SK St. Magdalena. From 2006 to 2010, he played for the Football Academy Linz and also for the youth teams of LASK. He then started his professional career with LASK Linz Juniors playing in the Austrian Regional League. He afterwards moved to Blau-Weiß Linz to play in the Austrian Football First League. In the summer of 2012, he was transferred to Austrian Bundesliga side FC Wacker Innsbruck. On 10 July 2014, he signed with SK Sturm Graz.

In June 2019, Piesinger signed a two-year contract with Danish Superliga club Randers FC. During the 2020–21 season, Randers achieved a significant milestone in their history by securing a place in the championship playoffs of the Danish Superliga via a fifth-place finish in the regular season. Moreover, the club claimed victory in the Danish Cup after defeating SønderjyskE 4–0 in the final at Ceres Park in Aarhus, with Piesinger contributing with a goal. On 14 June 2021, he extended his contract until 2023.

On 3 June 2022, Randers announced that they had sold Piesinger to Wolfsberger AC, marking his return to Austria. He signed a three-year contract.

== International career ==
He made his debut for the Austria under-21 team in 2012.

== Style of play ==
Piesinger started his career as a defensive midfielder, and during his time at Sturm Graz he was described someone with his strengths being his ability to pass the ball with precision, his tireless work ethic, and his leadership qualities. After joining Randers in 2019, he was increasingly utilised as a centre-back under head coach Thomas Thomasberg in a four-man defense next to Erik Marxen.

== Honours ==
Randers

- Danish Cup: 2020–21
