= Alexander Nybo =

Danish footballer (born 1995)

Personal information
- Full name: Alexander Jungklas Nybo
- Date of birth: 12 April 1995 (age 31)
- Place of birth: Randers, Denmark
- Height: 1.88 m (6 ft 2 in)
- Position: Goalkeeper

Youth career
- –2009: Sønderhald IF
- 2009–2015: Randers

Senior career*
Years	Team	Apps	(Gls)
2014–2015	Randers	0	(0)
2015–2017	Hobro	2	(0)
2017–2022	Fredericia	121	(0)
2022–2023	Randers	1	(0)

International career
2010–2011	Denmark U16	5	(0)
2011	Denmark U17	4	(0)
2013	Denmark U18	1	(0)
2013–2014	Denmark U19	2	(0)
2015	Denmark U20	1	(0)

Managerial career
- 2022–2023: Randers (youth gk coach)
- * Club domestic league appearances and goals as of 1 May 2023

Alexander Jungklas Nybo (born 12 April 1995) is a Danish retired professional footballer who played as a goalkeeper.

== Career ==
=== Randers FC ===
Nybo joined Randers FC in the summer 2009 from Sønderhald IF as a U-15 player. At the age of 16, Nybo was already training with the first team squad in Randers and in the 2014–15 season, he was promoted to the first team squad.

Nybo was on the bench for Randers in October 2014 against OB in the Danish Superliga.

=== Hobro IK ===
On 6 July 2015, 20-year old Nybo joined fellow league club, Danish Superliga side Hobro IK, on a two-year contract, where he was signed to substitute for Jesper Rask. He made his debut on 2 September 2015 against Vejle Boldklub in the Danish Cup. The match went on to penalty shootout, where Nybo saved the decisive penalty kick.

Nybo got his Danish Superliga debut on 15 May 2016 against OB, where he also saved a penalty in the game, which Hobro won 1–0. Nybo also started the game a week later against Brøndby IF. He made a total of four appearances in his first season in Hobro.

In the 2016–17, Nybo made two appearances, both in the Danish Cup.

=== Fredericia ===
On 6 June 2017, Nybo signed a two-year deal with Danish 1st Division club FC Fredericia, to replace Thomas Mikkelsen. Nybo quickly became the first choice in Fredericia, where he made 35 appearances in all tournaments in his first season at the club, despite the fact that he was injured for a few months when, from November 2017 until March 2018, he sat out with an injury in the hip flexor.

Nybo started the 2018–19 season again as the first choice and in October 2018, he signed a new contract with Fredericia until June 2021. He made 34 appearances throughout the 2018–19 season and 32 appearances in the following 2019–20 season.

After sitting heavily on the goalkeeper-position in Fredericia for the last three seasons, loan-player Elías Rafn Ólafsson started the 2020–21 season as the first choice. Nybo got the chance again in three league games in October 2021, when Ólafsson was out with COVID-19. Despite making only seven appearances in the 2020–21 season, he signed a new one-year contract extension in May 2021.

=== Return to Randers ===
On 22 January 2022 Randers FC confirmed, that Nybo had returned to the club on a deal until the end of 2024. In addition to being part of the player squad, Nybo would also serve as a goalkeeping coach for the youth teams.

On January 9, 2024, Randers confirmed that 28-year-old Nybo had decided to pull the plug and end his professional career with immediate effect.

== Personal life ==
Alexander Nybo is the son of Jens Nybo, who has worked as an international top handball referee for several years.
