= Jesper Lauridsen =

Danish footballer (born 1991)

Personal information
- Full name: Jesper Lauridsen
- Date of birth: 27 March 1991 (age 35)
- Place of birth: Midtjylland, Denmark
- Height: 1.80 m (5 ft 11 in)
- Positions: Left-back; centre-back

Youth career
- Midtjylland

Senior career*
Years	Team	Apps	(Gls)
2010–2016	Midtjylland	64	(3)
2013–2014	→ Hobro (loan)	27	(1)
2016–2020	Esbjerg fB	114	(3)
2020–2022	Randers	42	(0)
2022–2025	Esbjerg fB	35	(0)

International career
2010	Denmark U19	2	(0)
2010–2011	Denmark U20	4	(2)
2011–2012	Denmark U21	6	(0)
- * Club domestic league appearances and goals

Jesper Lauridsen (born 27 March 1991) is a Danish retired professional footballer who played as a left-back or centre-back.

== Career ==
Lauridsen joined Esbjerg fB in February 2016. On 16 January 2020, he moved to Randers FC. On 31 August 2022, he returnede to Esbjerg.

After Esbjerg fB's promotion to the 2024-25 Danish 1st Division, Lauridsen struggled to make the team and didn't get a single minute on the pitch in the league for the first six months of the season. On January 13, 2025, Lauridsen announced that he had decided to hang up his boots.

== Honours ==
Midtjylland

- Danish Superliga: 2014–15

Randers

- Danish Cup: 2020–21

Esbjerg fB

- Danish 2nd Division: 2023–24
