= Frederik Lauenborg =

Danish footballer (born 1997)

Personal information
- Full name: Fredrick Lauenborg
- Date of birth: 18 May 1997 (age 29)
- Place of birth: Denmark
- Height: 1.81 m (5 ft 11 in)
- Position: Midfielder

Team information
- Current team: Randers
- Number: 14

Youth career
- Vejlby
- –2009: Skovbakken
- 2009–2017: Randers

Senior career*
Years	Team	Apps	(Gls)
2017–	Randers	182	(4)
- * Club domestic league appearances and goals as of 19 May 2026

Frederik Lauenborg (born 18 May 1997) is a Danish professional footballer who plays as a midfielder for Randers FC in the Danish Superliga.

== Career ==
Lauenborg first appeared for the senior side of Danish Superliga club Randers on 9 July 2015 in their UEFA Europa League fixture against Sant Julià. He made his professional debut for Randers two years later on 26 August 2017 against Helsingør. He came on as a 79th-minute substitute for Perry Kitchen as Randers were defeated 2–0.

In the preseason for the 2023-24 Superliga he was injured with a knee ligament injury. A month after his comeback, he had a second cruciate ligament injury, which kept him out until May 2024. From August 2024 to November 2024 he was out with internal bleeding in the kidney following an injury in a match against FC København.

== Career statistics ==
As of 22 February 2026

Club	Season	League			Domestic Cup		Continental		Total	
Club	Season	Division	Apps	Goals	Apps	Goals	Apps	Goals	Apps	Goals
Randers	2017–18	Danish Superliga	18	0	0	0	—	—	18	0
Randers	2018–19	Danish Superliga	20	0	0	0	—	—	20	0
Randers	2019–20	Danish Superliga	31	0	1	0	—	—	32	0
Randers	2020–21	Danish Superliga	28	1	6	0	—	—	34	1
Randers	2021–22	Danish Superliga	27	0	1	0	9	1	37	1
Randers	2022–23	Danish Superliga	16	1	0	0	—	—	16	1
Randers	2023–24	Danish Superliga	5	0	0	0	—	—	5	0
Randers	2024–25	Danish Superliga	15	2	0	0	—	—	15	2
Randers	2025–26	Danish Superliga	15	0	1	0	—	—	16	0
Career total			175	4	9	0	9	1	193	5

== Honours ==
Randers

- Danish Cup: 2020–21
