= Karl Leth =

Danish football player (born 2002)

Personal information
- Full name: Karl Dreier Leth
- Date of birth: 22 August 2002 (age 24)
- Place of birth: Randers, Denmark
- Position: Right winger

Youth career
- Randers

Senior career*
Years	Team	Apps	(Gls)
2020–2022	Randers	1	(0)
2022	AB Argir	15	(0)
2022–2024	Skive	50	(3)
- * Club domestic league appearances and goals as of 19:21, 1 July 2024 (UTC)

Karl Dreier Leth (born 22 August 2002) is a Danish football player.

== Club career ==
He made his Danish Superliga debut for Randers FC on 13 September 2020 in a game against AC Horsens. On 4 February 2022, Leth moved to Faroese club Argja Bóltfelag. After much chaos at the club, Leth confirmed in early July 2022 that he had had his contract terminated at his own request.

On 3 August 2022, Leth joined Danish 2nd Division club Skive IK. Leth left Skive in the summer of 2024 and announced that he was taking a break from football.

== Honours ==
Randers

- Danish Cup: 2020–21
