= Mikkel Kallesøe =

Danish footballer (born 1997)

Personal information
- Full name: Mikkel Kallesøe Andreasen
- Date of birth: 20 April 1997 (age 29)
- Place of birth: Lemvig‚ Denmark
- Height: 1.93 m (6 ft 4 in)
- Position: Right-back

Team information
- Current team: AaB
- Number: 2

Youth career
- Lemvig GF
- –2012: Holstebro Boldklub
- 2012–2014: Randers

Senior career*
Years	Team	Apps	(Gls)
2014–2024	Randers	176	(10)
2017	→ Viborg (loan)	11	(0)
2024–2025	Horsens	27	(3)
2025–	AaB	18	(0)

International career
2012	Denmark U16	4	(1)
2013	Denmark U17	1	(0)
2014–2015	Denmark U18	4	(1)
2015–2016	Denmark U19	9	(0)
2016	Denmark U20	1	(0)
- * Club domestic league appearances and goals as of 2 June 2026

Mikkel Kallesøe Andreasen (born 20 April 1997) is a Danish professional footballer who plays as a right-back for Danish 1st Division club AaB.

== Club career ==
=== Randers FC ===
In the summer 2014, Kallesøe got promoted to the first team squad, at age 17, after signing a three-year professional- and full-time contract with the Randers.

On 26 October 2014, Kallesøe got his debut for Randers FC, at age 17. Kallesøe started on the bench, but replaced Kasper Fisker in the 80th minute in a 3–0 victory against OB.

In October 2016 in a match between Randers and Lyngby Boldklub, Kallesøe suffered a horrible concussion, which was the fifth concussion in his career. The concussion kept Kallesøe sidelined for 6 months and was close to making an end of his football career. Since this incident, Kallesøe has played with either a helmet or a special headband.

==== Loan to Viborg FF ====
On 31 August 2017, Kallesøe was loaned out to Viborg FF for the rest of 2017. Kallesøe made 12 appearances for Viborg, and despite the club expressing an interest in keeping him for longer, Kallesøe and Randers agreed on his return to the club from January 2018.

==== Return to Randers ====
Kallesøe signed a contract extension until 2023 with Randers on 4 January 2019. His deal was extended further on 21 September 2021, as he signed a five-year contract until 2026.

=== AC Horsens ===
On 6 July 2024, the Danish 1st Division club AC Horsens confirmed that Kallesøe joined the club on a contract until June 2027. He got his debut on July 21, 2024, in a league game against FC Fredericia.

=== AaB ===
On 19 June 2025, it was confirmed that AaB had signed Kallesøe from Horsens.

== Career statistics ==
=== Club ===
As of match played 10 April 2025

Appearances and goals by club, season and competition
Club	Season	League			Danish Cup		Continental		Other		Total	
Club	Season	Division	Apps	Goals	Apps	Goals	Apps	Goals	Apps	Goals	Apps	Goals
Randers	2013-14	Danish Superliga	0	0	0	0	0	0	—		0	0
Randers	2014-15	Danish Superliga	8	0	1	0	—		—		9	0
Randers	2015-16	Danish Superliga	12	1	2	0	1 (Note: Appearance(s) in UEFA Europa League)	0	—		15	1
Randers	2016-17	Danish Superliga	18	3	1	0	—		0	0	19	3
Randers	2017-18	Danish Superliga	14	0	1	0	—		4 (Note: Appearance(s) in Danish Superliga Relegation play-offs)	1	19	1
Randers	2018-19	Danish Superliga	24	3	0	0	—		0	0	24	3
Randers	2019-20	Danish Superliga	28	2	0	0	—		2 (Note: Appearance(s) in Danish Superliga European play-offs)	0	30	2
Randers	2020-21	Danish Superliga	22	0	4	0	—		—		26	0
Randers	2021-22	Danish Superliga	17	1	2	0	9 (Note: Two appearances in UEFA Europa League, Seven appearances in UEFA Europa Conference League)	0	—		28	1
Randers	2022-23	Danish Superliga	14	0	1	0	—		—		15	0
Randers	2023-24	Danish Superliga	17	0	2	0	—		0	0	19	0
Randers	Total		174	10	14	0	10	0	6	1	204	11
Viborg (loan)	2017-18	Danish 1st Division	11	0	0	0	—		—		11	0
Horsens	2024-25	Danish 1st Division	25	3	0	0	—		—		25	3
Career total			210	13	14	0	10	0	6	1	240	14

== Honours ==
Randers

- Danish Cup: 2020–21
