= Björn Kopplin =

German footballer (born 1989)

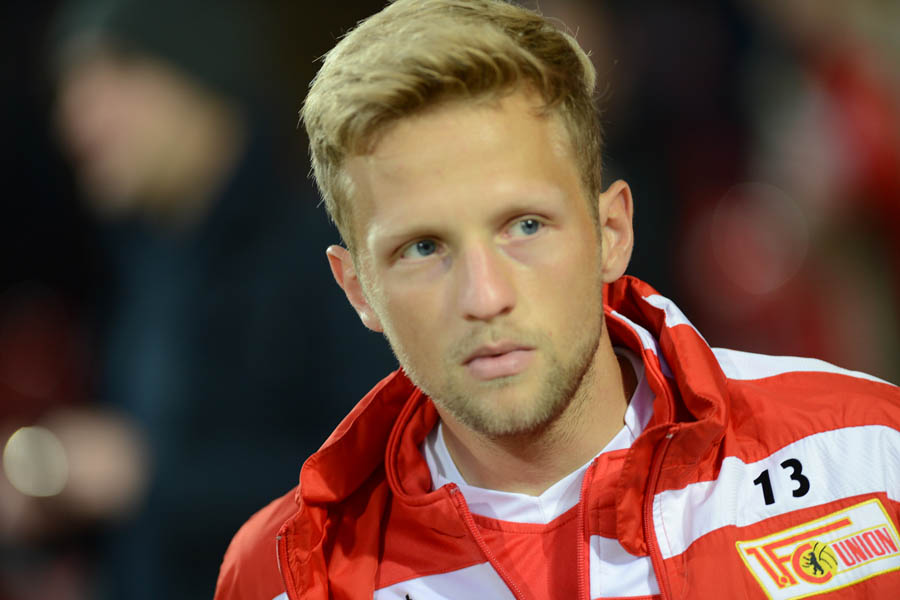
- Kopplin with 1. FC Union Berlin in 2013

Personal information
- Full name: Björn Kopplin
- Date of birth: 7 January 1989 (age 37)
- Place of birth: West Berlin, West Germany
- Height: 1.84 m (6 ft 0 in)
- Position: Right-back

Team information
- Current team: Randers U-19 (assistant)

Youth career
- 1996–2004: Union Berlin
- 2004–2008: Bayern Munich

Senior career*
Years	Team	Apps	(Gls)
2008–2010	Bayern Munich II	55	(0)
2010–2012	VfL Bochum	60	(1)
2012–2013	Union Berlin II	6	(0)
2012–2015	Union Berlin	37	(0)
2015–2016	Preußen Münster	38	(2)
2017–2018	Hobro	45	(4)
2018–2019	Brøndby	3	(0)
2019–2025	Randers	174	(9)

International career
2005–2006	Germany U17	13	(3)
2007–2008	Germany U19	16	(0)
2009	Germany U20	7	(2)

Managerial career
- 2025–: Randers U-19 (assistant)
- * Club domestic league appearances and goals

Björn Kopplin (born 7 January 1989) is a German retired professional footballer who played as a right-back and current youth coach at Randers FC.

== Club career ==
Kopplin was named in Bayern Munich's squad for the 2008–09 and 2009–10 UEFA Champions League. He was given the number 37 in the first team. On 13 June 2010, VfL Bochum announced that they had signed Kopplin for the following season.

In 2017, Kopplin was signed by Danish team, Hobro IK.

On 26 October 2018, Randers FC announced that they had signed Kopplin from Brøndby IF. He would join the club at the end of 2018.

In May 2025, Randers FC confirmed that Kopplin had decided to retire at the end of the season, but would remain at the club as he was set to become assistant coach of the club’s U19 team from the following season.

== International career ==
Kopplin was part of the Germany squad that won the 2008 UEFA Under-19 Championship. Kopplin is member of the Germany U20 team and played with the team at 2009 FIFA U-20 World Cup and scored two goals in the Round of 16.

== Career statistics ==
As of 4 June 2023

Appearances and goals by club, season and competition
Club	Season	League			Cup		Other		Total	
Club	Season	Division	Apps	Goals	Apps	Goals	Apps	Goals	Apps	Goals
Bayern Munich II	2007–08	Regionalliga Süd	1	0	–		–		1	0
Bayern Munich II	2008–09	3. Liga	20	0	–		–		20	0
Bayern Munich II	2009–10	3. Liga	34	0	–		–		34	0
Bayern Munich II	Total		55	0	0	0	0	0	55	0
VfL Bochum	2010–11	2. Bundesliga	34	0	0	0	–		34	0
VfL Bochum	2011–12	2. Bundesliga	26	1	3	0	–		29	1
VfL Bochum	Total		60	1	3	0	—		63	1
Union Berlin	2012–13	2. Bundesliga	11	0	0	0	—		11	0
Union Berlin	2013–14	2. Bundesliga	8	0	1	0	—		9	0
Union Berlin	2014–15	2. Bundesliga	18	0	0	0	—		18	0
Union Berlin	Total		37	0	1	0	—		38	0
Union Berlin II	2012–13	Regionalliga Nordost	1	0	—		—		1	0
Union Berlin II	2013–14	Regionalliga Nordost	5	0	—		—		5	0
Union Berlin II	Total		6	0	0	0	—		6	0
Preußen Münster	2015–16	3. Liga	38	2	–		2	1	40	3
Hobro	2016–17	NordicBet Liga	14	1	0	0	—		14	1
Hobro	2017–18	Superliga	31	3	4	0	2	0	37	3
Hobro	Total		45	4	4	0	2	0	51	4
Brøndby	2018–19	Superliga	3	0	2	0	—		5	0
Randers	2018–19	Superliga	13	2	0	0	—		13	2
Randers	2019–20	Superliga	33	3	3	0	—		36	3
Randers	2020–21	Superliga	26	0	7	0	—		33	0
Randers	2021–22	Superliga	29	0	2	0	10	0	41	0
Randers	2022–23	Superliga	26	2	2	0	—		28	2
Randers	Total		127	7	14	0	10	0	151	7
Career total			370	14	24	0	14	1	408	15
