= Mathias Nielsen =

Danish footballer (born 1991)

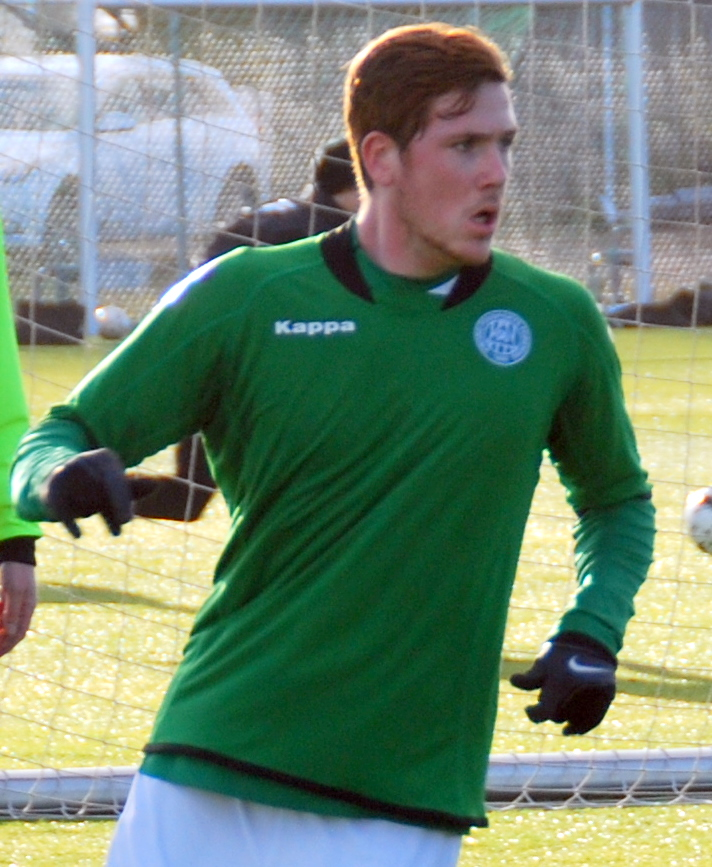

Personal information
- Full name: Mathias Aaris Kragh Nielsen
- Date of birth: 2 March 1991 (age 35)
- Place of birth: Nuuk, Greenland
- Height: 1.87 m (6 ft 2 in)
- Position: Centre-back

Team information
- Current team: Slagelse B&I

Youth career
- 1995–2009: Herfølge BK
- 2009–2010: HB Køge

Senior career*
Years	Team	Apps	(Gls)
2010–2012	Nordsjælland	2	(0)
2012	→ Viborg (loan)	9	(0)
2012–2014	Næstved		
2014–2019	Horsens	117	(4)
2019–2021	Randers	49	(1)
2021–2022	HB Køge	21	(0)
2022	NSÍ Runavík	11	(0)
2026–	Slagelse B&I	0	(0)

International career
2010	Denmark U20	1	(0)
- * Club domestic league appearances and goals as of 2 August 2023

Mathias Aaris Kragh Nielsen (born 2 March 1991) is a Danish footballer. He plays at centre-back for Slagelse B&I. Nielsen has 1 youth cap for Denmark, playing for the Danish under-20s.

A versatile player, Nielsen's preference is playing as a defensive midfielder, though mostly utilized at centre back and occasionally right back.

== Early life ==
Mathias Nielsen spent his entire youth career with Herfølge Boldklub, joining the club at 4 years of age, he went on to sign a contract with this childhood club in the summer of 2007. During the winter he would play indoor football with the team's indoor division, playing as goalkeeper. When Herfølge BK merged with Køge BK, Nielsen was carried over in to the newly formed club HB Køge.

== Senior career ==
=== F.C. Nordsjælland ===
1 July 2010 Nielsen moved to Superliga team F.C. Nordsjælland on a free transfer, signing a 1-year contract. He made his debut the following month as a substitute during the second leg of FCN's third qualifying round of the Europa League, against Portuguese side Sporting Lisbon. Amid interest from Italian clubs Parma and Napoli in March 2011, the young defender extended his contract with FCN for another two years.

17 July 2012, Nielsen left FCN for Næstved BK, having made a single appearance for the Farum club.

=== Næstved BK ===
After getting his contract with FC Nordsjælland terminated, he joined Danish 2nd Division club Næstved BK. After only a few months in his new club, he got his contract extended until the summer 2015. However, he was sold in 2014.

=== AC Horsens ===
AC Horsens announced in July 2014, that they had signed Nielsen. His contract was extended with two years in July 2015 and once again in September 2016, this time until 2019. During his second season in the club, he became the captain of the team.

In March 2017, Nielsen suffered a knee injury and that resulted in aa operation, that kept him out for the rest of the season.

=== Randers FC ===
Already in January 2019 it was confirmed, that Nielsen would join Randers FC for the 2019/20 season.

=== Later career ===
After a short stint in Faroese football with NSÍ Runavík, Nielsen retired from his playing career at the end of 2022. However, in November 2025, it was announced that Nielsen would return to football from January 2026, having signed a contract with the Danish Zealand Series club Slagelse B&I. He joined both as a player and in an off-field role, where he was given 'responsibilities for preparing the young players for senior football'."

== Career statistics ==
=== Club ===
As of July 1, 2012

Club	Season	League		Cup		Continental		Other		Total	
Club	Season	Apps	Goals	Apps	Goals	Apps	Goals	Apps	Goals	Apps	Goals
F.C. Nordsjælland	2010–11	1	0	2	0	1	0	0	0	4	0
F.C. Nordsjælland	2011–12	0	0	1	0	0	0	0	0	1	0
F.C. Nordsjælland	Total	1	0	3	0	1	0	0	0	5	0
Viborg FF	2011–12	9	0	0	0	0	0	0	0	9	0
Viborg FF	Total	9	0	0	0	0	0	0	0	9	0
Viborg FF	Career total	10	0	3	0	1	0	0	0	14	0

== Honours ==
=== Club ===
Nordsjælland

- Danish Cup: 2010–11

Randers

- Danish Cup: 2020–21
