= 2020–21 Danish Superliga =

31st season of Danish Superliga

Superliga
- Season: 2020–21
- Dates: 11 September 2020 – 28 May 2021
- Champions: Brøndby
- Relegated: Lyngby; Horsens
- Champions League: Brøndby; Midtjylland
- Europa League: Randers
- Europa Conference League: Copenhagen; AGF
- Matches: 193
- Goals: 559 (2.9 per match)
- Top goalscorer: Mikael Uhre (19)
- Biggest home win: Midtjylland 4–0 Copenhagen (8 November 2020)
- Biggest away win: Lyngby 0–4 Brøndby (14 February 2021)
- Highest scoring: Copenhagen 4–2 Lyngby (1 November 2020); Copenhagen 4–2 Midtjylland (19 May 2021)
- Longest winning run: 6 matches Randers
- Longest unbeaten run: 10 matches Copenhagen
- Longest winless run: 13 matches Lyngby
- Longest losing run: 4 matches Horsens; Lyngby; Nordsjælland; Randers; Vejle
- All statistics correct as of 28 May 2021.

The 2020–21 Danish Superliga (officially the 3F Superliga for sponsorship reasons) was the 31st season of the Danish Superliga. The season began on 11 September with reigning champions FC Midtjylland playing against the winners of the Danish Cup, SønderjyskE, losing 2–0 away from home.

This season marked the first season with the video assistant referee (VAR) system.

== Teams ==
Twelve teams competed in the league – the top ten teams from the previous season, the winner of the Relegation Playoffs and the champion of the 2019–20 Danish 1st Division. Lyngby BK retained its position in the Superliga by winning the Relegation Playoffs and Vejle BK joined the top flight after winning the 1st Division title.

=== Stadiums and locations ===
Locations of the Danish Superliga 2020–21 teams

Club	Stadium	Turf	Capacity	2019–20 position
AaB	Aalborg Portland Park	Hybrid	13,797	5th
AGF	Ceres Park	Hybrid	20,032	3rd
Brøndby	Brøndby Stadium	Hybrid	29,000	4th
Copenhagen	Telia Parken	Hybrid	38,065	2nd
Horsens	CASA Arena Horsens	Natural	10,400	8th
Lyngby	Lyngby Stadium	Natural	8,000	11th
Midtjylland	MCH Arena	Natural	11,800	1st
Nordsjælland	Right to Dream Park	Artificial	9,900	6th
OB	Nature Energy Park	Natural	15,633	7th
Randers	Cepheus Park Randers	Natural	12,000	9th
SønderjyskE	Sydbank Park	Natural	10,000	10th
Vejle	Vejle Stadium	Natural	10,418	1D, 1st

=== Personnel and sponsoring ===
Note: Flags indicate national team as has been defined under FIFA eligibility rules. Players and Managers may hold more than one non-FIFA nationality.

Team	Head coach	Captain	Kit manufacturer	Shirt sponsor
AaB	(Spain) Martí Cifuentes	(Denmark) Lucas Andersen	Hummel	Spar Nord
AGF	(Denmark) David Nielsen	(Sweden) Niklas Backman	Hummel	Ceres
Brøndby	(Denmark) Niels Frederiksen	(Denmark) Andreas Maxsø	Hummel	Booztlet
Copenhagen	(Denmark) Jess Thorup	(Greece) Zeca	Adidas	Carlsberg
Horsens	(Denmark) Jens Berthel Askou	(Faroe Islands) Hallur Hansson	Hummel	NG ZINK A/S
Lyngby	(Denmark) Carit Falch	(Denmark) Martin Ørnskov	Adidas	Jetbull
Midtjylland	(Denmark) Brian Priske	(Denmark) Erik Sviatchenko	Nike	Det Faglige Hus
Nordsjælland	(Denmark) Flemming Pedersen	(Denmark) Nicolai Larsen	Nike	DHL
OB	(Denmark) Michael Hemmingsen	(Denmark) Janus Drachmann	Hummel	Albani
Randers	(Denmark) Thomas Thomasberg	(Denmark) Erik Marxen	Puma	Verdo A/S
SønderjyskE	(Denmark) Glen Riddersholm	(Denmark) Marc Pedersen	Hummel	Frøs Herreds Sparekasse
Vejle	(Romania) Constantin Gâlcă	(Denmark) Jacob Schoop	Hummel	Arbejdernes Landsbank

=== Managerial changes ===
Team	Outgoing manager	Manner of departure	Date of vacancy	Replaced by	Date of appointment	Position in table
Horsens	(Denmark) Bo Henriksen	Mutual consent	24 August 2020	(Denmark) Jonas Dal	24 August 2020	Pre-season
Copenhagen	(Norway) Ståle Solbakken	Sacked	10 October 2020	(Denmark) Jess Thorup	2 November 2020	9th
AaB	(Denmark) Jacob Friis	Resigned	29 October 2020	(Denmark) Peter Feher (interim)	29 October 2020	7th
Horsens	(Denmark) Jonas Dal	Sacked	8 December 2020	(Denmark) Jens Berthel Askou	17 January 2021	11th
Lyngby	(Denmark) Christian Nielsen	Sacked	21 December 2020	(Denmark) Carit Falch	21 December 2020	12th
AaB	(Denmark) Peter Feher	End of tenure as caretaker	31 December 2020	(Spain) Martí Cifuentes	1 January 2021	7th
OB	(Denmark) Jakob Michelsen	Sacked	15 March 2021	(Denmark) Michael Hemmingsen	15 March 2021	9th

== Regular season ==
=== League table ===
Pos	Team	Pld	W	D	L	GF	GA	GD	Pts	Qualification
1	Brøndby	22	14	3	5	40	24	+16	45	Qualification for the Championship round
2	Midtjylland	22	13	4	5	35	20	+15	43	Qualification for the Championship round
3	AGF	22	10	8	4	35	22	+13	38	Qualification for the Championship round
4	Copenhagen	22	10	5	7	39	35	+4	35	Qualification for the Championship round
5	Randers	22	9	5	8	31	21	+10	32	Qualification for the Championship round
6	Nordsjælland	22	7	8	7	35	30	+5	29	Qualification for the Championship round
7	SønderjyskE	22	8	4	10	30	32	−2	28	Qualification for the Relegation round
8	OB	22	7	7	8	25	28	−3	28	Qualification for the Relegation round
9	AaB	22	7	7	8	24	30	−6	28	Qualification for the Relegation round
10	Vejle	22	6	6	10	25	37	−12	24	Qualification for the Relegation round
11	Lyngby	22	5	5	12	25	43	−18	20	Qualification for the Relegation round
12	Horsens	22	2	6	14	15	37	−22	12	Qualification for the Relegation round

Source: Danish Football Association (in Danish), Soccerway
Rules for classification: 1) Points; 2) Goal difference; 3) Goals scored; 4) Away goals scored; 5) Play-off (played on neutral ground if determining teams for different rounds); 6) Draw.

=== Positions by round ===
Team ╲ Round	1	2	3	4	5	6	7	8	9	10	11	12	13	14	15	16	17	18	19	20	21	22
Brøndby	4	1	1	1	1	4	5	4	3	1	3	2	2	1	1	1	1	2	2	1	1	1
Midtjylland	11	8	4	5	5	3	3	2	1	2	1	1	1	2	2	2	2	1	1	2	2	2
AGF	2	3	2	2	2	5	4	3	4	6	4	3	3	4	3	3	3	3	4	3	3	3
Copenhagen	8	11	10	9	9	8	8	9	10	9	7	6	6	6	4	4	4	4	3	4	4	4
Randers	1	2	6	8	8	10	10	10	9	8	6	5	4	3	5	5	5	5	5	5	5	5
Nordsjælland	9	9	5	7	7	6	6	7	7	4	5	8	8	8	10	10	10	10	8	10	8	6
SønderjyskE	3	7	3	4	4	2	1	1	2	3	2	4	5	5	6	6	6	7	7	7	6	7
OB	5	4	8	10	10	9	9	8	8	10	9	9	9	9	8	8	7	6	6	6	9	8
AaB	6	5	9	6	6	7	7	6	5	5	8	7	7	7	7	7	8	8	9	8	7	9
Vejle	10	6	7	3	3	1	2	5	6	7	10	10	10	10	9	9	9	9	10	9	10	10
Lyngby	7	10	11	11	11	11	11	11	11	12	12	12	12	11	11	11	11	11	11	11	11	11
Horsens	12	12	12	12	12	12	12	12	12	11	11	11	11	12	12	12	12	12	12	12	12	12

Source: Weltfussball

=== Results ===
Home \ Away	AAB	AGF	BRO	COP	HOR	LYN	MID	NOR	ODE	RAN	SON	VEJ
AaB	—	1–1	2–1	2–3	1–0	3–2	0–2	1–1	0–2	0–0	1–0	1–3
AGF	3–0	—	3–1	0–1	3–0	1–0	1–2	0–1	4–2	1–1	2–0	4–2
Brøndby	1–1	1–1	—	2–1	2–1	4–1	2–3	3–2	3–1	0–0	2–1	2–1
Copenhagen	1–2	3–3	1–2	—	2–0	4–2	0–0	3–2	1–1	1–2	3–2	2–1
Horsens	2–1	1–2	1–2	0–2	—	1–2	2–2	1–1	0–0	0–3	0–3	3–1
Lyngby	0–0	1–2	0–4	2–2	1–1	—	2–0	0–3	0–3	0–3	2–2	0–0
Midtjylland	0–0	0–1	1–0	4–0	1–0	1–0	—	3–1	3–1	1–0	1–2	5–0
Nordsjælland	2–2	3–1	0–1	0–1	2–2	4–1	4–1	—	0–2	1–0	2–1	1–1
OB	2–1	0–0	0–3	3–2	1–0	0–1	1–1	1–1	—	2–1	1–1	0–1
Randers	1–2	1–1	1–2	2–1	3–0	1–2	1–2	1–1	2–1	—	1–2	3–1
SønderjyskE	3–1	1–1	2–0	1–3	2–0	1–4	2–0	2–1	1–1	0–1	—	0–1
Vejle	0–2	0–0	0–2	2–2	0–0	3–2	0–2	2–2	2–0	0–3	4–1	—

Source: soccerway.com
Legend: Blue = home team win; Yellow = draw; Red = away team win.

== Championship round ==
Points and goals carried over in full from the regular season.

Pos	Team	Pld	W	D	L	GF	GA	GD	Pts	Qualification	BRO	MID	COP	AGF	NOR	RAN
1	Brøndby (C)	32	19	4	9	58	38	+20	61	Qualification for the Champions League play-off round	—	3–1	1–3	2–2	2–0	2–0
2	Midtjylland	32	18	6	8	57	33	+24	60	Qualification for the Champions League second qualifying round	1–0	—	4–1	4–0	3–0	1–1
3	Copenhagen	32	16	7	9	61	53	+8	55	Qualification for the Europa Conference League second qualifying round	2–1	4–2	—	3–2	2–2	2–1
4	AGF (O)	32	13	9	10	48	42	+6	48	Qualification for the European play-off match	1–2	1–4	1–2	—	3–1	2–0
5	Nordsjælland	32	11	10	11	51	51	0	43		0–3	3–2	2–2	2–0	—	2–1
6	Randers	32	11	7	14	43	38	+5	40	Qualification for the Europa League play-off round (Note: Randers qualified for the Europa League play-off round by winning the 2020–21 Danish Cup.)	4–2	0–0	2–1	0–1	3–4	—

Source: Danish Football Association (in Danish), Soccerway
Legend: Blue = home team win; Yellow = draw; Red = away team win.
Rules for classification: 1) Points; 2) Goal difference; 3) Goals scored; 4) Away goals scored; 5) Play-off (played on neutral ground if determining teams for different rounds); 6) Draw.
(C) Champions; (O) Play-off winners

=== Positions by round ===
Below the positions per round are shown. As teams did not all start with an equal number of points, the initial pre-playoffs positions are also given.

Team ╲ Round	22	23	24	25	26	27	28	29	30	31	32
Brøndby	1	2	2	2	2	2	2	2	2	1	1
Midtjylland	2	1	1	1	1	1	1	1	1	2	2
Copenhagen	4	3	3	3	4	3	3	3	3	3	3
AGF	3	4	4	4	3	4	4	4	4	4	4
Nordsjælland	6	5	5	5	5	5	5	5	5	5	5
Randers	5	6	6	6	6	6	6	6	6	6	6

== Relegation round ==
Points and goals carried over in full from the regular season.

Pos	Team	Pld	W	D	L	GF	GA	GD	Pts	Qualification or relegation	AAB	SON	ODE	VEJ	LYN	HOR
1	AaB	32	12	10	10	44	41	+3	46	Qualification for the European play-off match	—	3–2	3–2	2–1	4–0	1–1
2	SønderjyskE	32	13	5	14	45	48	−3	44		0–4	—	2–0	1–0	2–0	2–3
3	OB	32	11	10	11	40	39	+1	43		1–0	1–1	—	0–1	2–0	4–0
4	Vejle	32	9	11	12	42	50	−8	38		1–1	4–2	2–2	—	2–2	3–0
5	Lyngby (R)	32	6	8	18	36	63	−27	26	Relegation to Danish 1st Division	2–2	0–1	1–2	0–0	—	3–4
6	Horsens (R)	32	5	9	18	30	59	−29	24	Relegation to Danish 1st Division	1–0	1–2	1–1	3–3	1–3	—

Source: Danish Football Association (in Danish), Soccerway
Legend: Blue = home team win; Yellow = draw; Red = away team win.
Rules for classification: 1) Points; 2) Goal difference; 3) Goals scored; 4) Away goals scored; 5) Play-off (played on neutral ground if determining teams for different rounds); 6) Draw.
(R) Relegated

=== Positions by round ===
Below the positions per round are shown. As teams did not all start with an equal number of points, the initial pre-playoffs positions are also given.

Team ╲ Round	22	23	24	25	26	27	28	29	30	31	32
AaB	3	1	1	1	1	1	1	1	1	2	1
SønderjyskE	1	3	3	3	2	2	2	2	2	1	2
OB	2	2	2	2	4	3	3	3	3	3	3
Vejle	4	4	4	4	3	4	4	4	4	4	4
Lyngby	5	5	5	5	5	5	5	5	5	5	5
Horsens	6	6	6	6	6	6	6	6	6	6	6

== European play-offs ==
The fourth-placed team of the championship round, AGF, advanced to a Europa Conference League play-off match against the winning team of the relegation round, AaB. The winners earned a place in the Europa Conference League second qualifying round.

=== European play-off match ===
28 May 2021
19:00

AGF	2–2 (a.e.t.)	AaB
Blume 20'; J. Thorsteinsson 120'	Report	T. van Weert 69'; Kusk 109'
Penalties
	3–1

Ceres Park, Aarhus
Attendance: 8,083
Referee: Jens Grabski Maae

== Season statistics ==
=== Top goalscorers ===
As of 28 May 2021.

Rank	Player	Club	Goals
1	(Denmark) Mikael Uhre	Brøndby	19
2	(Denmark) Patrick Mortensen	AGF	15
2	(Denmark) Jonas Wind	Copenhagen	15
4	(Guinea) Sory Kaba	Midtjylland	11
4	(United States) Haji Wright	SønderjyskE	11
6	(Denmark) Anders K. Jacobsen	SønderjyskE	10
6	(Denmark) Jesper Lindstrøm	Brøndby	10
6	(Brazil) Allan Gonçalves Sousa	Vejle	10
6	(Tunisia) Issam Jebali	OB	10
6	(Poland) Kamil Wilczek	Copenhagen	10
6	(Ghana) Kamaldeen Sulemana	Nordsjælland	10
12	(Denmark) Vito Hammershøy-Mistrati	Randers	9
12	(Sierra Leone) Alhaji Kamara	Randers	9
12	(Norway) Iver Fossum	AaB	9
