= Erik Marxen =

Danish footballer (born 1990)

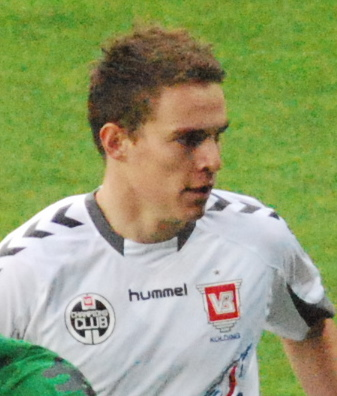
- Marxen with Vejle-Kolding in 2011

Personal information
- Date of birth: 2 December 1990 (age 35)
- Place of birth: Middelfart, Denmark
- Height: 1.85 m (6 ft 1 in)
- Position: Centre-back

Youth career
- Middelfart G&BK
- Vejle

Senior career*
Years	Team	Apps	(Gls)
2009–2011	Vejle	37	(5)
2011–2013	Vejle-Kolding	50	(5)
2013–2015	Horsens	30	(2)
2014–2015	→ SønderjyskE (loan)	30	(0)
2015–2021	Randers	174	(7)
2022–2025	Nordsjælland	37	(0)
Total		358	(19)
- * Club domestic league appearances and goals

Erik Marxen (born 2 December 1990) is a Danish former professional footballer who played as a centre-back.

== Career ==
=== Vejle ===
Marxen was born in Middelfart. He began his career in the youth academy of the local club Middelfart G&BK where he played alongside the likes of Christian Eriksen and Rasmus Falk. He eventually joined Vejle Boldklub, and made his professional debut on 13 April 2009 in a 4–1 loss in the Danish Superliga to FC Copenhagen. He came on as a late substitute for Marc Pedersen. On 10 June 2009, he signed a contract until 2011 which promoted him to the first team.

=== Horsens ===
An integral part of the Vejle side in the second-tier 1st Division, in January 2013 he signed a contract with AC Horsens that would see him move in the summer transfer window.

=== Randers ===
On 9 March 2015, it was announced that Marxen would join Randers FC on a three-year deal starting from 1 July 2015. He made his debut on 2 July 2015 in a 1–0 away win over Andorran club UE Sant Julià in the UEFA Europa League, coming on as a substitute for goalscorer Jonas Borring in the 82nd minute. He made his domestic league debut for the club on 9 August in a 3–3 home draw against Brøndby. Marxen scored his first goal for the club on 23 November in a 3–2 defeat away against AaB. The goal was a special one, as Marxen scored directly from a corner kick, swerving over AaB-goalkeeper Nicolai Larsen.

On 23 June 2018, Marxen extended his contract with Randers until December 2020.

Marxen was appointed the new team captain of Randers on 30 January 2019, taking over the role from Nicolai Poulsen who would leave the club as a free agent for rivals AGF. The following season, he won his first trophy as Randers clinched the Danish Cup victory in a 4–0 beatdown of SønderjyskE in the final, with Marxen scoring the opening goal in the second minute.

=== Nordsjælland ===
On 22 December 2021, Marxen signed a four‑year contract with Nordsjælland, effective from the opening of the January 2022 transfer window. He made his competitive debut on 20 February 2022, starting at centre‑back in a 2–0 Superliga defeat to Brøndby.

Used chiefly as cover during the following two seasons, Marxen did not start a league match between April 2023 and February 2025. He returned to the starting line-up on 25 February 2025, contributing to a 3–2 home win over Sønderjyske. Head coach Jens Fønsskov Olsen praised the defender's professionalism, stating that Marxen "sets the standard every day on the training pitch and passes on his experience to the younger players."

On 14 October 2025, Nordsjælland announced that Marxen had retired from professional football due to injury.

== Career statistics ==
Appearances and goals by club, season and competition
Club	Season	League			National cup		Europe		Other		Total	
Club	Season	Division	Apps	Goals	Apps	Goals	Apps	Goals	Apps	Goals	Apps	Goals
Vejle	2008–09	Danish Superliga	1	0	0	0	—		—		1	0
Vejle	2009–10	Danish 1st Division	19	1	2	0	—		—		21	2
Vejle	2010–11	Danish 1st Division	17	4	5	0	—		—		23	4
Vejle	Total		37	5	7	0	—		—		44	6
Vejle-Kolding	2011–12	Danish 1st Division	22	1	2	0	—		—		23	1
Vejle-Kolding	2012–13	Danish 1st Division	28	4	2	2	—		—		30	6
Vejle-Kolding	Total		50	5	4	2	—		—		53	7
Horsens	2013–14	Danish 1st Division	30	2	6	1	—		—		36	3
Sønderjyske (loan)	2014–15	Danish Superliga	30	0	6	1	—		—		36	1
Randers	2015–16	Danish Superliga	22	1	2	0	4 (Note: Appearance(s) in UEFA Europa League)	0	—		28	1
Randers	2016–17	Danish Superliga	30	2	3	1	—		—		33	3
Randers	2017–18	Danish Superliga	25	2	4	0	—		4 (Note: Appearance(s) in Danish Superliga play-off)	0	33	2
Randers	2018–19	Danish Superliga	34	1	0	0	—		—		34	1
Randers	2019–20	Danish Superliga	26	1	2	0	—		—		28	1
Randers	2020–21	Danish Superliga	23	0	5	1	—		—		28	1
Randers	2021–22	Danish Superliga	14	0	1	0	5 (Note: Appearances in UEFA Conference League)	0	—		20	0
Randers	Total		174	7	17	2	9	0	4	0	204	9
Nordsjælland	2021–22	Danish Superliga	8	0	—		—		—		8	0
Nordsjælland	2022–23	Danish Superliga	19	0	6	0	—		—		25	0
Nordsjælland	2023–24	Danish Superliga	2	0	4	0	3	0	—		9	0
Nordsjælland	2024–25	Danish Superliga	8	0	1	0	—		—		9	0
Nordsjælland	Total		37	0	11	0	3	0	—		51	0
Career total			358	19	51	6	12	0	4	0	424	25

== Honours ==
Randers

- Danish Cup: 2020–21
