= 2019–20 AaB season =

AaB
2019–20 season
- Sports director: Allan Gaarde (until 22 October 2019); Thomas Bælum & Jacob Friis (from 22 October 2019 to 31 March 2020); Inge André Olsen (from 1 April 2020)
- Head coach: Jacob Friis
- Stadium: Aalborg Portland Park
- Danish Superliga: 6th
- Danish Cup: Runners-up
- Top goalscorer: League: Lucas Andersen (10); All: Lucas Andersen; Kasper Kusk (11 each)
- Highest home attendance: 11,645 vs F.C. København (1 September 2019, 3F Superliga)
- Lowest home attendance: 0 vs Lyngby BK (8 March 2020, 3F Superliga); 0 vs AGF (7 June 2020, 3F Superliga); Matches were played behind closed doors to prevent spreading COVID-19.
- Average home league attendance: 5,610
Home colours	Away colours	Third colours

The 2019–20 season is AaB's 37th consecutive season in the top flight of Danish football, 30th consecutive season in the Danish Superliga, and 134th year in existence as a football club.

After AaB had played its first 24 matches of the 3F Superliga season and reached the semi-final of the Sydbank Pokalen, all Danish sports were postponed, starting from 18 March 2020, due to the COVID-19 pandemic. On 7 May 2020, the Danish government allowed professional sports taking place outdoors to return behind closed doors, thus also football. As a result of the unexpected break, the season was prolonged to include the months of June and July with two additional friendlies being played before the restart of the tournaments. AaB qualified for the club's 12th Danish Cup final.

== Club ==
=== Coaching staff ===
Position	Staff
Head coach	(Denmark) Jacob Friis
Assistant coaches	(Denmark) Allan K. Jepsen (until 24 June 2020) (Denmark) Lasse Stensgaard (until 24 June 2020) (Denmark) Thomas Augustinussen (from 24 June 2020) (Denmark) Rasmus Würtz (from 24 June 2020)
Development manager	(Denmark) Poul Erik Andreasen (until 1 August 2019)
Head of coaching	(Denmark) Søren Krogh (from 1 January 2020)
Goalkeeping coach	(Denmark) Poul Buus
Analyst	(Denmark) Jim Holm Larsen
Team Leader	(Denmark) Ernst Damborg
Doctor	(Denmark) Søren Kaalund
Physiotherapist	(Denmark) Morten Skjoldager
Physical trainer	(England) Ashley Tootle
Mental trainer	(Denmark) Rasmus Würtz
U/19 League coach	(Denmark) David Olsen
U/17 League coach	(Denmark) Nikolaj Hørby
U/15 League coach	(Faroe Islands) Claus Bech Jørgensen

Source: AaB Fodbold

=== Other information ===
Owner	(Denmark) AaB A/S
Chief executive	(Denmark) Thomas Bælum
Sports director	(Denmark) Allan Gaarde (until 22 October 2019) (Denmark) Thomas Bælum (from 22 October 2019 to 31 March 2020) (Denmark) Jacob Friis (from 22 October 2019 to 31 March 2020) (Norway) Inge André Olsen (from 1 April 2020)
Head of press and communications	(Denmark) Brian Andersen
Head of experience	(Denmark) Martin Stigaard Skammelsen
Head of sales	(Denmark) Morten Brinkmann
Ground (capacity and dimensions)	Nordjyske Arena (13,997 / 105x70 metres)
Training ground	AaB Training Ground

Source: AaB Fodbold

== Squad ==
=== First team squad ===
This squad list includes any first team squad player who has been available for the line-up during the season.

No.	Pos.	Nation	Player
1	GK	(Sweden) SWE	Jacob Rinne
2	DF	(Denmark) DEN	Patrick Kristensen
3	DF	(Denmark) DEN	Jakob Ahlmann
4	DF	(Denmark) DEN	Jakob Blåbjerg (until 2 September 2019)
5	DF	(Denmark) DEN	Jores Okore
6	DF	(Denmark) DEN	Kristoffer Pallesen
7	MF	(Denmark) DEN	Oliver Abildgaard (until 3 February 2020)
8	MF	(Norway) NOR	Iver Fossum (from 16 August 2019)
9	FW	(Netherlands) NED	Tom van Weert (vice-captain)
10	FW	(Denmark) DEN	Lucas Andersen (captain)
14	FW	(Slovakia) SVK	Pavol Šafranko (until 1 August 2019)
14	MF	(Denmark) DEN	Malthe Højholt (from 1 January 2020)
15	DF	(Denmark) DEN	Lukas Klitten
16	MF	(Denmark) DEN	Magnus Christensen
17	MF	(Denmark) DEN	Kasper Kusk

No.	Pos.	Nation	Player
18	MF	(Denmark) DEN	Rasmus Thellufsen (until 29 August 2019)
19	FW	(Canada) CAN	Aramis Kouzine (from 27 February 2019)
20	DF	(Denmark) DEN	Oliver Klitten
21	MF	(Denmark) DEN	Patrick Olsen
22	GK	(Denmark) DEN	Andreas Hansen
23	MF	(Uganda) UGA	Robert Kakeeto (until 13 August 2019, from 1 January 2020)
24	DF	(Denmark) DEN	Mathias Ross
25	MF	(Denmark) DEN	Frederik Børsting
26	DF	(Denmark) DEN	Rasmus Thelander (from 22 August 2019)
27	FW	(Denmark) DEN	Søren Tengstedt
28	MF	(Denmark) DEN	Jeppe Pedersen (from 1 January 2020)
29	FW	(Denmark) DEN	Mikkel Kaufmann (until 31 January 2020)
30	FW	(Denmark) DEN	Wessam Abou Ali (until 23 August 2019)
32	DF	(Denmark) DEN	Kasper Pedersen (from 20 July 2019)
34	DF	(Denmark) DEN	Anders Bærtelsen

Source: AaB Fodbold website

=== Youth players in use ===
This list includes any youth player from AaB Academy who has been used in the season.

No.	Pos.	Nation	Player
14	MF	(Denmark) DEN	Malthe Højholt (from AaB U19)
28	MF	(Denmark) DEN	Jeppe Pedersen (from AaB U19)
31	DF	(Denmark) DEN	Marcus Hannesbo (from AaB U19)

== Transfers and loans ==
=== In ===
==== Summer ====
Squad #	Position	Player	Transferred from	Date	Source
22	GK	(Denmark) Andreas Hansen	(Denmark) HB Køge	1 July 2019	
10	FW	(Denmark) Lucas Andersen	(Switzerland) Grasshoppers	1 July 2019	
15	DF	(Denmark) Lukas Klitten	(Denmark) AaB Academy	1 July 2019	
20	MF	(Denmark) Oliver Klitten	(Denmark) AaB Academy	1 July 2019	
27	MF	(Denmark) Søren Tengstedt	(Denmark) AaB Academy	1 July 2019	
29	FW	(Denmark) Mikkel Kaufmann	(Denmark) AaB Academy	1 July 2019	
34	DF	(Denmark) Anders Bærtelsen	(Denmark) AaB Academy	1 July 2019	
21	MF	(Denmark) Patrick Olsen	(Denmark) FC Helsingør	26 June 2019	
32	DF	(Denmark) Kasper Pedersen	Free agent	20 July 2019	
8	MF	(Norway) Iver Fossum	(Germany) Hannover 96	16 August 2019	
26	DF	(Denmark) Rasmus Thelander	(Netherlands) Vitesse	22 August 2019	

==== Winter ====
Squad #	Position	Player	Transferred from	Date	Source
14	MF	(Denmark) Malthe Højholt	(Denmark) AaB Academy	1 January 2020	
28	MF	(Denmark) Jeppe Pedersen	(Denmark) AaB Academy	1 January 2020	
19	FW	(Canada) Aramis Kouzine	(Ukraine) SC Dnipro-1	27 February 2020	

=== Out ===
==== Summer ====
Squad #	Position	Player	Transferred to	Date	Source
33	DF	(Albania) Bardhec Bytyqi	(Denmark) Jammerbugt FC	1 July 2019	
22	GK	(United States) Michael Lansing	(Denmark) AC Horsens	1 July 2019	
21	MF	(Denmark) Kasper Risgård	Retirement	1 July 2019	
8	MF	(Denmark) Rasmus Würtz	Retirement	1 July 2019	
32	DF	(Denmark) Kasper Pedersen	Free agent	1 July 2019	
19	FW	(Denmark) Marco Ramkilde	(England) Queens Park Rangers	1 July 2019	
14	FW	(Slovakia) Pavol Šafranko	(Romania) Sepsi Sfântu Gheorghe	1 August 2019	

==== Winter ====
Squad #	Position	Player	Transferred to	Date	Source
29	FW	(Denmark) Mikkel Kaufmann	(Denmark) F.C. København	31 January 2020	

=== Loan in ===
Squad #	Position	Player	Loaned from	Start	End	Source

=== Loan out ===
Squad #	Position	Player	Loaned to	Start	End	Source
23	MF	(Slovakia) Filip Lesniak	(Denmark) Silkeborg IF	12 July 2019	31 July 2020	
26	MF	(Uganda) Robert Kakeeto	(Finland) HIFK Fotboll	13 August 2019	31 December 2020	
30	FW	(Denmark) Wessam Abou Ali	(Denmark) Vendsyssel FF	13 August 2019	31 December 2019	
18	MF	(Denmark) Rasmus Thellufsen	(Germany) F.C. Hansa Rostock	29 August 2019	30 June 2020	
4	DF	(Denmark) Jakob Blåbjerg	(Denmark) Vendsyssel FF	2 September 2019	31 July 2020	
30	FW	(Denmark) Wessam Abou Ali	(Denmark) Vendsyssel FF	5 January 2020	31 July 2020	
7	MF	(Denmark) Oliver Abildgaard	(Russia) FC Rubin Kazan	3 February 2020	30 June 2020	

== Friendlies ==
=== Pre-season ===
21 June 2019 Friendly	Thorup/Klim Boldklub (Denmark)	0 – 13	AaB	Thorup, Denmark
18:00 CEST		Report	Kusk 6', 17', 29', 45'; Thellufsen 22'; Christensen 27'; Kaufmann 34' van Weert 53', 58'; Højholt 60', 71'; Tengstedt 68'; Børsting 83'	Stadium: Thorup Stadion

22 June 2019 Friendly	Veddum IF XI (Denmark)	1 – 7	AaB	Veddum, Denmark
15:00 CEST	Sørensen 25'	Report	Andersen 13' van Weert 33', 36'; Kusk 38'; O. Klitten 48'; Pallesen 85'; Kaufmann 88'	Stadium: Veddum Stadion; Referee: Morten B. Georgsen

29 June 2019 Friendly	Ajax (Netherlands)	1 – 1	AaB	Oldenzaal, Netherlands
12:00 CEST	Danilo 49'	Report	van Weert 17' van Weert (penalty missed) 42'	Stadium: Sportpark Vondersweijde; Attendance: 2,000

5 July 2019 Friendly	AC Horsens (Denmark)	0 – 4	AaB	Horsens, Denmark
13:00 CEST		Report	Olsen 23', 35'; Børsting 38'; Kaufmann 77'	Stadium: Casa Arena Horsens

4 September 2019 Friendly	FC St. Pauli (Germany)	0 – 2	AaB	Norderstedt, Germany
12:00 CEST		Report	Kusk 32'; Fossum 64'	Stadium: Edmund-Plambeck-Stadion

14 November 2019 Friendly	Hamburger SV (Germany)	1 – 0	AaB	Hamburg, Germany
12:00 CET	Wood 9'	Report		Stadium: Trainingsplatz Volksparkstadion

=== Mid-season ===
21 January 2020 Friendly	AGF (Denmark)	0 – 2	AaB	Aarhus, Denmark
13:00 CET		Report	van Weert 29' (pen.); O. Klitten 32'	Stadium: Fredensvang

26 January 2020 Friendly	IFK Göteborg (Sweden)	2 – 3	AaB	Gothenburg, Sweden
14:00 CET	Sana; Affane 82'	Report	Abildgaard 45'; Kaufmann 65'; Tengstedt 72'; Okore (red card) 90+1'	Stadium: Prioritet Serneke Arena; Attendance: 1,915; Referee: Bojan Pandžić, Sweden

4 February 2020 Friendly	AaB	Cancelled^{1}	(China) Wuhan Zall F.C.	Marbella, Spain
		Report

5 February 2020 Friendly	AaB	1 – 1^{(Match played 4 x 30 minutes)}	(Germany) SC Freiburg under-23	La Línea de la Concepción, Spain
15:30 CET	Pallesen 116'	Report	Pieringer 39'	Stadium: Estadio Municipal de La Línea de la Concepción

11 February 2020^{2} Friendly	Vendsyssel FF (Denmark)	0 – 3	AaB	Vrå, Denmark
11:00 CET		Report	Kusk 7', 34'; Andersen 16' (pen.); Thelander (red card) 67'	Stadium: Idrætscenter Vendsyssel; Referee: Mikkel Redder, Denmark

Notes

- Note 1: The match was cancelled due to the COVID-19 pandemic.
- Note 2: The match was initially scheduled for 9 February 2020, but postponed due to Storm Ciara.

=== Post-coronabreak ===
22 May 2020 Friendly	AaB	0 – 3	(Denmark) FC Midtjylland	Aalborg, Denmark
13:00 CEST		Report	Kaba 43'; Schwartz 59'; Vibe 63'	Stadium: Aalborg Portland Park; Attendance: 0 Referee: Mikkel Redder, Denmark

26 May 2020 Friendly	OB (Denmark)	3 – 4	AaB	Odense, Denmark
18:00 CEST	Opondo 40'; Tverskov 44'; Svendsen 65' (pen.)	Report	O. Klitten 15'; Okore 53'; Pallesen 74' van Weert 53'	Stadium: Nature Energy Park; Attendance: 0 Referee: Mads-Kristoffer Kristoffersen, Denmark

== Competitions ==
=== Competition record ===
Competition	Record							
Competition	G	W	D	L	GF	GA	GD	Win %
3F Superliga	30	12	5	13	48	42	+6	40.00
Sydbank Pokalen	5	5	0	0	22	2	+20	100.00
Total	35	17	5	13	70	44	+26	48.57

=== Superliga ===
==== Results summary ====
Overall								Home						Away					
Pld	W	D	L	GF	GA	GD	Pts	W	D	L	GF	GA	GD	W	D	L	GF	GA	GD
30	12	5	13	48	42	+6	41	7	2	6	24	21	+3	5	3	7	24	21	+3

Last updated: 26 June 2020.
Source: Competitive matches

==== Regular season ====
Pos	Team	Pld	W	D	L	GF	GA	GD	Pts	Qualification
4	Brøndby	26	13	3	10	47	37	+10	42	Qualification for the Championship round
5	Nordsjælland	26	12	5	9	48	35	+13	41	Qualification for the Championship round
6	AaB	26	11	5	10	44	33	+11	38	Qualification for the Championship round
7	Randers	26	10	5	11	39	35	+4	35	Qualification for the Relegation round
8	Horsens	26	10	4	12	25	44	−19	34	Qualification for the Relegation round

Source: Danish Football Association (in Danish), Soccerway
Rules for classification: 1) Points; 2) Goal difference; 3) Goals scored; 4) Away goals scored; 5) Play-off (played on neutral ground if determining teams for different rounds); 6) Draw.

===== Matches =====
14 July 2019 1	Lyngby BK	2 – 0	AaB	Kongens Lyngby
14:00 CEST	Gytkjær 36', 47'	Report		Stadium: Lyngby Stadion; Attendance: 2,971; Referee: Jørgen Daugbjerg Burchardt

21 July 2019 2	AaB	1 – 1	SønderjyskE	Aalborg
14:00 CEST	Andersen 71'	Report	Albæk 79'	Stadium: Aalborg Portland Park; Attendance: 4,355; Referee: Jakob Kehlet

29 July 2019 3	AaB	3 – 1	Silkeborg IF	Aalborg
18:00 CEST	van Weert 21', 39'; Kaufmann 41'	Report	Schwartz 78'	Stadium: Aalborg Portland Park; Attendance: 5,885; Referee: Jens Grabski Maae

4 August 2019 4	FC Midtjylland	1 – 0	AaB	Herning
18:00 CEST	Sviatchenko (red card) 53'; Evander 89'	Report	van Weert (penalty missed) 27'	Stadium: MCH Arena; Attendance: 7,965; Referee: Morten Krogh

11 August 2019 5	AaB	4 – 0	Esbjerg fB	Aalborg
14:00 CEST	Andersen 19' (pen.), 45'; Børsting 31'; Kaufmann 33'	Report		Stadium: Aalborg Portland Park; Attendance: 4,380; Referee: Peter Kjærsgaard

18 August 2019 6	Brøndby IF	2 – 1	AaB	Brøndbyvester
18:00 CEST	Kaiser 32'; Wilczek 49'	Report	Olsen 55'	Stadium: Brøndby Stadion; Attendance: 11,349; Referee: Jens Grabski Maae

26 August 2019 7	AC Horsens	0 – 5	AaB	Horsens
19:00 CEST		Report	Andersen 10', 84'; Okore 13'; Olsen 79', 82'	Stadium: Casa Arena Horsens; Attendance: 2,709; Referee: Benjamin Willaume-Jantzen

1 September 2019 8	AaB	1 – 0	F.C. København	Aalborg
16:00 CEST	Kusk 18'	Report		Stadium: Aalborg Portland Park; Attendance: 11,645; Referee: Jakob Kehlet

15 September 2019 9	AGF	3 – 0	AaB	Aarhus
12:00 CEST	Bundu 6', 35', 65' (pen.)	Report		Stadium: Ceres Park; Attendance: 10,235; Referee: Anders Poulsen

22 September 2019 10	FC Nordsjælland	2 – 1	AaB	Farum
14:00 CEST	Rasmussen 23'; Francis 39'	Report	Kaufmann 58'	Stadium: Right to Dream Park; Attendance: 3,031; Referee: Morten Krogh

29 September 2019 11	AaB	0 – 3	Randers FC	Aalborg
14:00 CEST	Fossum (penalty missed) 59'	Report	Egho 23'; Lobzhanidze 76'; Kallesøe 89'	Stadium: Aalborg Portland Park; Attendance: 5,083; Referee: Peter Kjærsgaard

5 October 2019 12	Hobro IK	0 – 2	AaB	Hobro
16:00 CEST		Report	Olsen 20'; Fossum 56'	Stadium: DS Arena; Attendance: 2,734; Referee: Benjamin Willaume-Jantzen

18 October 2019 13	AaB	1 – 0	OB	Aalborg
19:00 CEST	Andersen 14' (pen.)	Report		Stadium: Aalborg Portland Park; Attendance: 6,086; Referee: Sandi Putros

27 October 2019 14	SønderjyskE	1 – 3	AaB	Haderslev
18:00 CET	Lieder 25'	Report	Kaufmann 79', 90+3'; Kusk 90' (pen.)	Stadium: Sydbank Park; Attendance: 3,843; Referee: Jørgen Daugbjerg Burchardt

3 November 2019 15	AaB	0 – 1	FC Midtjylland	Aalborg
16:00 CET		Report	Onyeka 11'	Stadium: Aalborg Portland Park; Attendance: 6,305; Referee: Mads-Kristoffer Kristoffersen

8 November 2019 16	Randers FC	3 – 3	AaB	Randers
19:00 CET	Hammershøy-Mistrati 8'; Nielsen 20'; Kamara 68'	Report	Kaufmann 2', 73'; Christensen 62'	Stadium: Cepheus Park Randers; Attendance: 4,156; Referee: Morten Krogh

24 November 2019 17	AaB	4 – 0	AC Horsens	Aalborg
14:00 CET	Børsting 55'; Olsen 61' van Weert 87'; Abildgaard 90+1'	Report	Ludwig (red card) 48'	Stadium: Aalborg Portland Park; Attendance: 4,048; Referee: Michael Tykgaard

1 December 2019 18	AaB	1 – 1	Hobro IK	Aalborg
18:00 CET	van Weert 9'	Report	Thelander 5' (o.g.)	Stadium: Aalborg Portland Park; Attendance: 4,520; Referee: Peter Kjærsgaard

9 December 2019 19	OB	0 – 0	AaB	Odense
19:00 CET		Report		Stadium: Nature Energy Park; Attendance: 5,801; Referee: Mikkel Redder

13 December 2019 20	AaB	1 – 3	FC Nordsjælland	Aalborg
19:00 CET	Pallesen 74'	Report	Rasmussen 3'; Kristensen 28' (o.g.); Rygaard 90+2'	Stadium: Aalborg Portland Park; Attendance: 3,791; Referee: Jakob Kehlet

16 February 2020 21	Silkeborg IF	0 – 2	AaB	Silkeborg
14:00 CET		Report	Kusk 46', 60'	Stadium: JYSK Park; Attendance: 2,667; Referee: Jørgen Daugbjerg Burchardt

23 February 2020 22	AaB	3 – 2	Brøndby IF	Aalborg
18:00 CET	van Weert 53', 55'; Andersen 77' (pen.)	Report	Mráz 57'; Jung 63'	Stadium: Aalborg Portland Park; Attendance: 7,896; Referee: Mads-Kristoffer Kristoffersen

1 March 2020 23	F.C. København	3 – 2	AaB	Copenhagen
18:00 CET	Santos 55', 64'; Biel 57'	Report	Andersen 72'; Fossum 78'	Stadium: Telia Parken; Attendance: 13,240; Referee: Jakob Kehlet

8 March 2020 24	AaB	3 – 0	Lyngby BK	Aalborg
14:00 CET	van Weert 19'; Kusk 28'; Andersen 37'	Report		Stadium: Aalborg Portland Park; Attendance: 0^{1} Referee: Mikkel Redder

13 March 2020 25	Esbjerg fB	Postponed^{2}	AaB	Esbjerg
19:00 CET				Stadium: Blue Water Arena

22 March 2020 26	AaB	Postponed^{2}	AGF	Aalborg
14:00 CET				Stadium: Aalborg Portland Park

31 May 2020 25	Esbjerg fB	1 – 1	AaB	Esbjerg
18:00 CEST	Yakovenko 67'	Report	Tengstedt 83'	Stadium: Blue Water Arena; Attendance: 0^{1} Referee: Jakob Kehlet

7 June 2020 26	AaB	2 – 3	AGF	Aalborg
17:00 CET	Pallesen 59'; Andersen 88'	Report	Blume 27'; Mortensen 65', 79' (pen.)	Stadium: Aalborg Portland Park; Attendance: 0^{1} Referee: Morten Krogh

Notes

- Note 1: Matches played behind closed doors to prevent spreading of coronavirus.
- Note 2: Matches were postponed due to the COVID-19 pandemic.

==== Championship round ====
Pos	Team	Pld	W	D	L	GF	GA	GD	Pts	Qualification	MID	COP	AGF	BRO	AaB	NOR
1	Midtjylland (C)	36	26	4	6	61	29	+32	82	Qualification for the Champions League second qualifying round	—	3–1	3–4	0–0	1–2	6–3
2	Copenhagen	36	21	5	10	58	42	+16	68	Qualification for the Europa League second qualifying round	1–2	—	2–4	0–0	2–0	2–1
3	AGF (O)	36	19	7	10	58	41	+17	64	Qualification for the European play-off match	3–0	1–0	—	0–1	1–4	2–1
4	Brøndby	36	16	8	12	56	42	+14	56		1–1	1–1	0–0	—	0–1	4–0
5	AaB	36	16	6	14	54	44	+10	54		0–2	0–1	1–0	2–0	—	0–4
6	Nordsjælland	36	13	8	15	59	54	+5	47		0–1	1–1	1–1	0–2	0–0	—

Source: Danish Football Association (in Danish), Soccerway
(C) Champions; (O) Play-off winners

===== Matches =====
14 June 2020 27	AaB	0 – 2	FC Midtjylland	Aalborg
14:00 CET		Report	Sviatchenko 28'; Andersson 40'	Stadium: Aalborg Portland Park; Attendance: 280^{1} Referee: Peter Kjærsgaard

17 June 2020 28	F.C. København	2 – 0	AaB	Copenhagen
20:00 CET	Daramy 2', 27'	Report		Stadium: Telia Parken; Attendance: 500^{2} Referee: Benjamin Willaume-Jantzen

20 June 2020 29	AaB	0 – 4	FC Nordsjælland	Aalborg
18:00 CET		Report	Damsgaard 34', 37'; Kudus 51', 58'	Stadium: Aalborg Portland Park; Attendance: 280^{1} Referee: Jens Grabski Maae

26 June 2020 30	AGF	1 – 4	AaB	Aarhus
19:00 CET	Ankersen 45+2'	Report	Thelander 38' van Weert 40'; Fossum 44'; Tengstedt 90+2'	Stadium: Ceres Park; Attendance: 300^{3} Referee: Morten Krogh

5 July 2020 31	AaB	2 – 0	Brøndby IF	Aalborg
18:00 CET	Thelander (yellow card) 23'; Børsting 40'; Fossum (yellow card) 67'; Olsen 69'	Summary	Gammelby (yellow card) 52'	Stadium: Aalborg Portland Park; Attendance: 280; Referee: (Denmark) Anders Poulsen

9 July 2020 32	AaB	1 – 0	AGF	Aalborg
18:00 CET–	Børsting 38'; Rhine (yellow card) 68'	Summary	Poulsen (yellow card) 32' (yellow-red card) 51'; Diks (yellow card) 58'; Þorsteinsson (yellow card) 79'	Stadium: Aalborg Portland Park; Attendance: 1,627; Referee: (Denmark) Sandi Putros

12 July 2020 33	FC Nordsjælland	0 – 0	AaB	Farum
14:00 CET	Mesík (yellow card) 23'; Atanga (yellow card) 47'	Summary	Christensen (yellow card) 80'; Olsen (yellow card) 87'	Stadium: Right to Dream Park; Attendance: 910; Referee: (Denmark) Peter Kjærsgaard-Andersen

19 July 2020 34	Brøndby IF	0 – 1	AaB	Brøndbyvester
18:00 CET	Slimane (yellow card) 90+3'; Fisker (yellow card) 90+6'	Summary	van Weert 10' (pen.); Ross (yellow card) 41'; Ahlmann (yellow card) 49'; Thelander (yellow card) 67'; Okore (yellow card) 90+6'	Stadium: Brøndby Stadion; Attendance: 5,219; Referee: (Denmark) Jorgen Burchardt

23 July 2020 35	AaB	0 – 1	F.C. København	Aalborg
20:00 CET		Summary	Zeca 53'; Falk (yellow card) 55'; Wind (yellow card) 70'; Papagiannopoulos (yellow card) 81'; Kaufmann (yellow card) 90+1'	Stadium: Aalborg Portland Park; Attendance: 3,347; Referee: (Denmark) Peter Kjærsgaard-Andersen

26 July 2020 36	FC Midtjylland	1 – 2	AaB	Herning
19:00 CET	Evander 53' (pen.)	Summary	Van Weert 18'; Olsen 21'; Klitten (yellow card) 24'; Pallesen (yellow card) 43'	Stadium: MCH Arena; Attendance: 4,792; Referee: (Denmark) Jakob Kehlet

- Note 1: The capacity of Aalborg Portland Park was limited to 280 as a measure to prevent spreading of coronavirus.
- Note 2: The capacity of Telia Parken was limited to 500 as a measure to prevent spreading of coronavirus.
- Note 3: The capacity of Ceres Park was limited to 300 as a measure to prevent spreading of coronavirus.

=== Danish Cup ===
11 September 2019 Second round	Nørresundby FB	0–8	AaB	Nørresundby
17:15 CEST		Report	Fossum 10', 43' (pen.), 85'; Thelander 37'; Børsting 59'; Kusk 63'; Olsen 76', 77'	Stadium: Nordjyske Bank Arena; Referee: Aydın Uslu

25 September 2019 Third round	Vejgaard BK	0–6	AaB	Aalborg
16:30 CEST		Report	Kristensen 46'; Kusk 52' (pen.), 56', 75', 77', 90+1'	Stadium: Soffy Road; Attendance: 2,000; Referee: Mikkel Redder

27 November 2019^{1} Fourth round	HB Køge	0–3	AaB	Køge
18:00 CET		Report	Abildgaard 24'; Fossum 59' van Weert 86'	Stadium: Capelli Sport Stadion; Attendance: 1,651; Referee: Jakob Sundberg

4 March 2020 Quarter-final	AaB	2–0	Copenhagen	Aalborg
18:30 CET	Ross 43'; O. Klitten 48'	Report		Stadium: Aalborg Portland Park; Attendance: 7,739; Referee: Jens Grabski Maae

10 June 2020 Semi-final	AaB	3–2	AGF	Aalborg
20:45 CEST	Fossum 35', 54'; Andersen 50'	Report	Blume 77'; Helenius 90'	Stadium: Aalborg Portland Park; Attendance: 280^{1} Referee: Sandi Putros

1 July 2020 Final	AaB	0–2	SønderjyskE	Esbjerg
20:00 CEST	Okore (yellow card) 13'; Christensen (yellow card) 21'; Ross (yellow card) 71'	Summary	Eskesen (yellow card) 23' (yellow-red card) 65'; Jónsson (yellow card) 32'; Jacobsen 38' 56'; Bah (yellow card) 46'; Jakobsen (yellow card) 49'; Banggaard (yellow card) 75'	Stadium: Blue Water Arena; Attendance: 1,750; Referee: (Denmark) Jorgen Burchardt

Notes

- Note 1: The match was originally scheduled for 30 October 2019, 18:00 CET, but was postponed as AaB's kit manager got stuck in traffic on his way to Køge.
- Note 2: The capacity of Aalborg Portland Park was limited to 280 as a measure to prevent spreading of coronavirus.

== Statistics ==
=== Appearances ===
As of 26 June 2020

This includes all competitive matches. The list is sorted by shirt number when appearances are equal.

Rnk	Pos	No.	Player	Superliga	Danish Cup	Total
1	MF	21	(Denmark) Patrick Olsen	29	4	33
2	DF	6	(Denmark) Kristoffer Pallesen	28	4	32
3	DF	5	(Denmark) Jores Okore	29	2	31
3	MF	17	(Denmark) Kasper Kusk	26	5	31
3	MF	25	(Denmark) Frederik Børsting	27	4	31
6	MF	8	(Norway) Iver Fossum	25	4	29
6	FW	10	(Denmark) Lucas Andersen	27	2	29
8	GK	1	(Sweden) Jacob Rinne	28	0	28
9	DF	3	(Denmark) Jakob Ahlmann	24	3	27
10	MF	16	(Denmark) Magnus Christensen	22	4	26
11	FW	9	(Netherlands) Tom van Weert	18	4	22
11	DF	24	(Denmark) Mathias Ross	17	5	22
13	DF	2	(Denmark) Patrick Kristensen	17	3	20
13	MF	20	(Denmark) Oliver Klitten	15	5	20
15	FW	29	(Denmark) Mikkel Kaufmann	17	2	19
16	DF	32	(Denmark) Kasper Pedersen	17	1	18
17	DF	26	(Denmark) Rasmus Thelander	14	3	17
18	MF	7	(Denmark) Oliver Abildgaard	11	1	12
18	FW	27	(Denmark) Søren Tengstedt	10	2	12
20	MF	23	(Uganda) Robert Kakeeto	9	1	10
21	DF	15	(Denmark) Lukas Klitten	7	1	8
21	GK	22	(Denmark) Andreas Hansen	3	5	8
23	DF	34	(Denmark) Anders Bærtelsen	2	1	3
24	MF	14	(Denmark) Malthe Højholt	1	1	2
24	MF	18	(Denmark) Rasmus Thellufsen	2	0	2
24	MF	28	(Denmark) Jeppe Pedersen	0	2	2
24	FW	30	(Denmark) Wessam Abou Ali	2	0	2
28	DF	31	(Denmark) Marcus Hannesbo	0	1	1

=== Goalscorers ===
As of 26 June 2020

This includes all competitive matches. The list is sorted by shirt number when total goals are equal.

Rnk	Pos	No.	Player	Superliga	Danish Cup	Total
1	FW	10	(Denmark) Lucas Andersen	10	1	11
1	MF	17	(Denmark) Kasper Kusk	5	6	11
3	MF	8	(Norway) Iver Fossum	3	6	9
3	FW	9	(Netherlands) Tom van Weert	8	1	9
5	MF	21	(Denmark) Patrick Olsen	5	2	7
5	FW	29	(Denmark) Mikkel Kaufmann	7	0	7
7	MF	25	(Denmark) Frederik Børsting	2	1	3
8	DF	6	(Denmark) Kristoffer Pallesen	2	0	2
8	MF	7	(Denmark) Oliver Abildgaard	1	1	2
8	DF	26	(Denmark) Rasmus Thelander	1	1	2
8	FW	27	(Denmark) Søren Tengstedt	2	0	2
12	DF	2	(Denmark) Patrick Kristensen	0	1	1
12	DF	5	(Denmark) Jores Okore	1	0	1
12	MF	7	(Denmark) Magnus Christensen	1	0	1
12	MF	20	(Denmark) Oliver Klitten	0	1	1
12	DF	24	(Denmark) Mathias Ross	0	1	1
TOTALS				48	22	70

=== Assists ===
As of 26 June 2020

This includes all competitive matches. The list is sorted by shirt number when total assists are equal.

Rnk	Pos	No.	Player	Superliga	Danish Cup	Total
1	FW	10	(Denmark) Lucas Andersen	8	1	9
1	MF	17	(Denmark) Kasper Kusk	6	3	9
3	MF	25	(Denmark) Frederik Børsting	3	3	6
4	MF	21	(Denmark) Patrick Olsen	3	2	5
5	MF	8	(Norway) Iver Fossum	3	1	4
6	DF	6	(Denmark) Kristoffer Pallesen	2	1	3
7	DF	3	(Denmark) Jakob Ahlmann	2	0	2
7	FW	9	(Netherlands) Tom van Weert	0	2	2
7	MF	20	(Denmark) Oliver Klitten	1	1	2
10	GK	1	(Sweden) Jacob Rinne	1	0	1
10	DF	2	(Denmark) Patrick Kristensen	1	0	1
10	FW	27	(Denmark) Søren Tengstedt	0	1	1
TOTALS				40	15	45

=== Clean sheets ===
As of 26 June 2020

This includes all competitive matches. The list is sorted by shirt number when total clean sheets are equal.

Rnk	Pos	No.	Player	Superliga	Danish Cup	Total
1	GK	1	(Sweden) Jacob Rinne	9	0	9
2	GK	22	(Denmark) Andreas Hansen	0	4	4
TOTALS				9	4	13

=== Disciplinary record ===
As of 26 June 2020

This includes all competitive matches. The list is sorted by shirt number when total cards are equal.

Rnk	Pos.	No.	Player	Superliga		Danish Cup		Total	
Rnk	Pos.	No.	Player	Booked	Sent off (straight red)	Booked	Sent off (straight red)	Booked	Sent off (straight red)
1	DF	3	(Denmark) Jakob Ahlmann	7	0	1	0	8	0
1	MF	16	(Denmark) Magnus Christensen	8	0	0	0	8	0
3	FW	9	(Netherlands) Tom van Weert	7	0	0	0	7	0
3	MF	21	(Denmark) Patrick Olsen	5	0	2	0	7	0
5	DF	24	(Denmark) Mathias Ross	5	0	1	0	6	0
6	FW	10	(Denmark) Lucas Andersen	5	0	0	0	5	0
6	MF	17	(Denmark) Kasper Kusk	4	0	1	0	5	0
8	DF	5	(Denmark) Jores Okore	4	0	0	0	4	0
9	MF	25	(Denmark) Frederik Børsting	3	0	0	0	3	0
10	GK	1	(Sweden) Jacob Rinne	2	0	0	0	2	0
10	DF	6	(Denmark) Kristoffer Pallesen	1	0	1	0	2	0
10	MF	8	(Norway) Iver Fossum	1	0	1	0	2	0
10	MF	23	(Uganda) Robert Kakeeto	2	0	0	0	2	0
10	DF	26	(Denmark) Rasmus Thelander	1	0	1	0	2	0
10	DF	32	(Denmark) Kasper Pedersen	2	0	0	0	2	0
16	MF	7	(Denmark) Oliver Abildgaard	1	0	0	0	1	0
16	MF	14	(Denmark) Malthe Højholt	0	0	1	0	1	0
16	DF	15	(Denmark) Lukas Klitten	0	0	1	0	1	0
16	MF	20	(Denmark) Oliver Klitten	1	0	0	0	1	0
16	FW	29	(Denmark) Mikkel Kaufmann	1	0	0	0	1	0
16	HC	–	(Denmark) Jacob Friis	1	0	0	0	1	0
TOTALS				58	0	10	0	68	0

=== Suspensions ===
As of 26 June 2020

This includes all competitive matches. The list is sorted by shirt number when total matches suspended are equal.

Rnk	Pos	No.	Player	Superliga	Danish Cup	Total
1	DF	3	(Denmark) Jakob Ahlmann	2	0	2
1	MF	16	(Denmark) Magnus Christensen	2	0	2
3	DF	5	(Denmark) Jores Okore	1	0	1
3	FW	9	(Netherlands) Tom van Weert	1	0	1
3	FW	10	(Denmark) Lucas Andersen	1	0	1
3	MF	17	(Denmark) Kasper Kusk	1	0	1
3	MF	21	(Denmark) Patrick Olsen	1	0	1
3	DF	24	(Denmark) Mathias Ross	1	0	1
TOTALS				10	0	10

== Awards ==
=== Team ===
Award	Month	Source

=== Individual ===
No.	Player	Award	Month	Source
10	(Denmark) Lucas Andersen	Superliga Player of the Month	August 2019	
10	(Denmark) Lucas Andersen	Danish goal of the year	28 February 2020	
