= 2020–21 AaB season =

AaB
2020–21 season
- Sports director: Inge André Olsen
- Head coach: Jacob Friis (until 29 October 2020); Peter Feher (interim, from 29 October 2020 to 31 December 2020); Martí Cifuentes (from 1 January 2021)
- Stadium: Aalborg Portland Park
- Danish Superliga: 7th
- Danish Cup: Fourth round
- Top goalscorer: League: Iver Fossum (9); All: Iver Fossum (9)
- Highest home attendance: 3,369 (Note: The capacity of Aalborg Portland Park limited to prevent the spread of COVID-19)
- Lowest home attendance: 0
- Average home league attendance: 894
Home colours	Away colours	Third colours

The 2020–21 season was AaB's 38th consecutive season in the top flight of Danish football, 31st consecutive season in the Danish Superliga, and 135th year in existence as a football club.

== Club ==
=== Coaching staff ===
Position	Staff
Head coach	(Denmark) Jacob Friis (until 29 October 2020, resigned) (Denmark) Peter Feher (interim, from 29 October 2020 to 31 January 2021) (Spain) Martí Cifuentes (from 1 January 2021)
Assistant coaches	(Denmark) Peter Feher (Denmark) Rasmus Würtz
Head of football	(Denmark) Søren Krogh
Goalkeeping coach	(Denmark) Poul Buus
Analyst	(Denmark) Jim Holm Larsen
Team Leader	(Denmark) Ernst Damborg
Doctor	(Denmark) Søren Kaalund
Physiotherapist	(Denmark) Morten Skjoldager
Physical trainer	(England) Ashley Tootle
U/19 League coach	(Denmark) Kim Leth Andersen
U/17 League coach	(Denmark) Nikolaj Hørby
U/15 League coach	(Denmark) Theis Larsen
U/14 League coach	(Denmark) Jonas Westmark
U/13 League coach	(Denmark) Philip Nødgaard

Source: AaB Fodbold

=== Other information ===
Owner	(Denmark) AaB A/S
Chief executive	(Denmark) Thomas Bælum
Sports director	(Norway) Inge André Olsen
Head of press and communications	(Denmark) Brian Andersen
Head of experience	(Denmark) Martin Stigaard Skammelsen
Head of sales	(Denmark) Morten Brinkmann
Head of talents	(Denmark) Anders Damgaard
Head of security	(Denmark) Kim Kyst
Ground (capacity and dimensions)	Nordjyske Arena (13,997 / 105x70 metres)
Training ground	AaB Training Ground

Source: AaB Fodbold

== Squad ==
=== First team squad ===
This squad list includes any first team squad player who has been available for the line-up during the season.

No.	Pos.	Nation	Player
1	GK	SWE	Jacob Rinne
2	DF	DEN	Kristoffer Pallesen
3	DF	DEN	Jakob Ahlmann
4	DF	DEN	Mathias Ross
5	DF	DEN	Jores Okore (until 25 February 2021)
6	MF	POR	Pedro Ferreira
7	MF	SWE	Oscar Hiljemark (from 5 October 2020)
8	MF	NOR	Iver Fossum
9	FW	NED	Tom van Weert (vice-captain)
10	FW	DEN	Lucas Andersen (captain)
11	FW	SWE	Tim Prica
14	MF	DEN	Malthe Højholt
15	DF	DEN	Lukas Klitten
16	MF	DEN	Magnus Christensen
17	FW	DEN	Kasper Kusk

No.	Pos.	Nation	Player
18	FW	NOR	Martin Samuelsen (from 1 February 2021)
19	FW	FRA	Timothé Nkada (until 2 May 2021)
20	MF	DEN	Oliver Klitten (until 1 October 2020; from 4 January 2021)
22	GK	DEN	Andreas Hansen
23	MF	UGA	Robert Kakeeto
24	DF	SRB	Vladimir Prijović
25	MF	DEN	Frederik Børsting
26	DF	DEN	Rasmus Thelander
28	MF	DEN	Jeppe Pedersen (until 27 January 2021)
30	FW	ESP	Rufo (from 8 February 2021)
31	DF	NOR	Daniel Granli
32	DF	DEN	Kasper Pedersen (until 15 January 2021)
33	DF	DEN	Thomas Christiansen (until 25 January 2021)
35	FW	DEN	Marcus Hannesbo (from 11 February 2021)

Source: AaB Fodbold website

=== Youth players in use ===
This list includes any youth player from AaB Academy who has been used in the season.

No.	Pos.	Nation	Player
35	FW	DEN	Marcus Hannesbo (from AaB U19)

== Transfers and loans ==
=== In ===
==== Summer ====
Squad #	Position	Player	Transferred from	Date	Source
33	DF	(Denmark) Thomas Christiansen	(Denmark) AaB Academy	1 August 2020	
11	FW	(Sweden) Tim Prica	(Sweden) Malmö FF	10 August 2020	
24	DF	(Serbia) Vladimir Prijović	(Serbia) Crvena Zvezda	11 August 2020	
6	MF	(Portugal) Pedro Ferreira	(Portugal) Varzim S.C.	19 August 2020	
7	MF	(Sweden) Oscar Hiljemark	(Italy) Genoa C.F.C.	5 October 2020	

==== Winter ====
Squad #	Position	Player	Transferred from	Date	Source
31	DF	(Norway) Daniel Granli	(Sweden) AIK	4 January 2021	
30	FW	(Spain) Rufo	(Norway) Sandefjord Fotball	8 February 2021	
35	FW	(Denmark) Marcus Hannesbo	(Denmark) AaB Academy	11 February 2021	

=== Out ===
==== Summer ====
Squad #	Position	Player	Transferred to	Date	Source
7	MF	(Denmark) Oliver Abildgaard	(Russia) FC Rubin Kazan	20 June 2020	
2	MF	(Denmark) Patrick Kristensen	Retirement	1 August 2020	
4	DF	(Denmark) Jakob Blåbjerg	Retirement	1 August 2020	
19	FW	(Canada) Aramis Kouzine	Released	1 August 2020	
23	MF	(Slovakia) Filip Lesniak	(Poland) Wisła Płock	1 August 2020	
27	FW	(Denmark) Søren Tengstedt	(Denmark) AGF	1 August 2020	
34	DF	(Denmark) Anders Bærtelsen	(Denmark) Vendsyssel FF	7 August 2020	
21	MF	(Denmark) Patrick Olsen	(Denmark) AGF	19 August 2020	
18	MF	(Denmark) Rasmus Thellufsen	(Denmark) Lyngby Boldklub	6 September 2020	
30	FW	(Denmark) Wessam Abou Ali	(Denmark) Silkeborg IF	8 September 2020	

==== Winter ====
Squad #	Position	Player	Transferred to	Date	Source
32	DF	(Denmark) Kasper Pedersen	(Denmark) Esbjerg fB	15 January 2021	
33	DF	(Denmark) Thomas Christiansen	(Denmark) Vendsyssel FF	25 January 2021	
5	DF	(Denmark) Jores Okore	(China) Changchun Yatai F.C.	25 February 2021	

=== Loan in ===
Squad #	Position	Player	Loaned from	Start	End	Source
19	FW	(France) Timothé Nkada	(France) Stade de Reims	4 August 2020	2 May 2021^{1}	
31	DF	(Norway) Daniel Granli	(Sweden) AIK	3 September 2020	31 December 2020	
18	FW	(Norway) Martin Samuelsen	(England) Hull City	1 February 2021	30 June 2021	

- Note 1: In the initial agreement between AaB and Stade de Reims, the loan of Timothé Nkada was to run until 30 June 2021. However, AaB chose to return Nkada in the beginning of May 2021, as the player frequently was left out of the squad.

=== Loan out ===
Squad #	Position	Player	Loaned to	Start	End	Source
20	MF	(Denmark) Oliver Klitten	(Norway) FK Haugesund	1 October 2020	4 January 2021^{2}	
28	MF	(Denmark) Jeppe Pedersen	(Denmark) Skive IK	27 January 2021	30 June 2021	

- Note 2: In the initial agreement between AaB and FK Haugesund, the loan of Oliver Klitten was to run until 31 December 2021, with AaB being able to bring home the player in any intermediate transfer window. AaB activated this clause on 4 January 2021.

== Friendlies ==
=== Pre-season ===
19 August 2020 VAR test, (friendly)	Esbjerg fB (Denmark)	2 – 1	AaB	Ikast, Denmark
17:15 CEST	Kauko 8', 44'	Report	Prica 57'	Stadium: Wunderelf Arena

22 August 2020 Friendly	AaB	1 – 2	(Denmark) Silkeborg IF	Aalborg, Denmark
12:00 CEST	Prica 54'	Report	Kaalund 10'; Holten 55'	Stadium: AaB Training Ground

29 August 2020 Friendly	AaB	4 – 3	(Denmark) Randers FC	Aalborg, Denmark
13:00 CEST	Kusk 18' van Weert 62'; Pallesen 67'; Nkada 88'	Report	Riis 31', 34' (pen.), 44'	Stadium: AaB Training Ground; Referee: Mikkel Redder

4 September 2020 Friendly	AaB	2 – 1	(Denmark) OB	Aalborg, Denmark
15:00 CEST	van Weert 48' (pen.); Prica 62'	Report	Sabbi 1'	Stadium: AaB Training Ground; Referee: Patrick Remon Gammelholm

=== Mid-season ===
20 January 2021 Friendly	Randers FC (Denmark)	3 – 1	AaB	Randers, Denmark
13:00 CET	Høgh 49'; Egho 59' (pen.); Bundgaard 80'	Report	van Weert 86'	Stadium: Randers FC Training Ground

24 January 2021 Friendly	FC Midtjylland (Denmark)	3 – 1^{(Match played 2x45 + 30 minutes)}	AaB	Herning, Denmark
13:00 CET	Pfeiffer 6'; Dreyer 35'; Heiselberg 82'	Report	Hannesbo 72'	Stadium: Herning Fremads Kunstgræsbane

27 January 2021 Friendly	AaB	0 – 1	(Denmark) Lyngby BK	Gistrup, Denmark
12:30 CET		Report	Jørgensen 27'	Stadium: Gistrup Idrætscenter; Referee: Mikkel Redder

26 March 2021 Friendly	AaB	1 – 4	(Denmark) Silkeborg IF	Aalborg, Denmark
12:00 CET	Samuelsen 86'	Report	Klynge 4'; Abou Ali 17'; Vallys 33'; Mattsson 64'	Stadium: AaB Training Ground

== Competitions ==
=== Competition record ===
Competition	Record							
Competition	G	W	D	L	GF	GA	GD	Win %
Superliga	32	12	10	10	44	41	+3	37.50
Superliga European play-off	1	0	1	0	2	2	+0	0.00
Danish Cup	2	1	0	1	2	2	+0	50.00
Total	35	13	11	11	48	45	+3	37.14

=== Superliga ===
==== Results summary ====
Overall								Home						Away					
Pld	W	D	L	GF	GA	GD	Pts	W	D	L	GF	GA	GD	W	D	L	GF	GA	GD
32	12	10	10	44	41	+3	46	8	4	4	25	21	+4	4	6	6	19	20	−1

Last updated: 24 May 2021.
Source: Competitive matches

==== Regular season ====
Pos	Team	Pld	W	D	L	GF	GA	GD	Pts	Qualification
7	SønderjyskE	22	8	4	10	30	32	−2	28	Qualification for the Relegation round
8	OB	22	7	7	8	25	28	−3	28	Qualification for the Relegation round
9	AaB	22	7	7	8	24	30	−6	28	Qualification for the Relegation round
10	Vejle	22	6	6	10	25	37	−12	24	Qualification for the Relegation round
11	Lyngby	22	5	5	12	25	43	−18	20	Qualification for the Relegation round

Source: Danish Football Association (in Danish), Soccerway
Rules for classification: 1) Points; 2) Goal difference; 3) Goals scored; 4) Away goals scored; 5) Play-off (played on neutral ground if determining teams for different rounds); 6) Draw.

===== Matches =====
13 September 2020 1	Lyngby BK	0 – 0	AaB	Kongens Lyngby
14:00 CEST		Report	Prica (red card) 77'	Stadium: Lyngby Stadion; Attendance: 2,138; Referee: Mikkel Redder

21 September 2020 2	AaB	1 – 0	AC Horsens	Aalborg
19:00 CEST	van Weert 53'	Report		Stadium: Aalborg Portland Park; Attendance: 280; Referee: Sandi Putros

27 September 2020 3	SønderjyskE	3 – 1	AaB	Haderslev
14:00 CEST	Absalonsen 41' (pen.); Wright 88', 90+7'	Report	van Weert 63' (pen.)	Stadium: Sydbank Park; Attendance: 300; Referee: Benjamin Willaume-Jantzen

4 October 2020 4	AaB	1 – 1	AGF	Aalborg
16:00 CEST	Børsting 76'	Report	Mortensen 40' (pen.)	Stadium: Aalborg Portland Park; Attendance: 280; Referee: Jørgen Daugbjerg Burchardt

18 October 2020 5	F.C. København	1 – 2	AaB	Copenhagen
18:00 CEST	Falk 90+3'	Report	Fossum 35', 44'	Stadium: Parken; Attendance: 242; Referee: Jakob Kehlet

26 October 2020 6	AaB	1 – 3	Vejle Boldklub	Aalborg
19:00 CET	Børsting 12'	Report	Sousa 30', 86'; Ezatolahi 90+1'	Stadium: Aalborg Portland Park; Attendance: 300; Referee: Morten Krogh

1 November 2020 7	AaB	2 – 1	Brøndby IF	Aalborg
18:00 CET	Fossum 32' van Weert 85'	Report	Uhre 39'	Stadium: Aalborg Portland Park; Attendance: 300; Referee: Peter Kjærsgaard

6 November 2020 8	Randers FC	1 – 2	AaB	Randers
19:00 CET	Rømer 79' (pen.)	Report	Okore 21'; Hiljemark 53'	Stadium: Cepheus Park Randers; Attendance: 300; Referee: Mikkel Redder

22 November 2020 9	AaB	1 – 1	FC Nordsjælland	Aalborg
14:00 CET	Fossum 62'	Report	Diomande 29'	Stadium: Aalborg Portland Park; Attendance: 300; Referee: Jonas Hansen

28 November 2020 10	FC Midtjylland	0 – 0	AaB	Herning
16:00 CET		Report		Stadium: MCH Arena; Attendance: 300; Referee: Anders Poulsen

4 December 2020 11	OB	2 – 1	AaB	Odense
19:00 CET	Guðjohnsen 79'; Hyllegaard 87'	Report	Ahlmann 41'	Stadium: Nature Energy Park; Attendance: 300; Referee: Jens Maae

13 December 2020 12	AaB	3 – 2	Lyngby BK	Aalborg
14:00 CET	Kusk 2', 39'; Fossum 77'	Report	Pallesen 20' (o.g.); Gammelby 41'	Stadium: Aalborg Portland Park; Attendance: 300; Referee: Mikkel Redder

20 December 2020 13	AGF	3 – 0	AaB	Aarhus
16:00 CET	Links 16'; Þorsteinsson 25', 34'	Report		Stadium: Ceres Park; Attendance: 300; Referee: Anders Poulsen

3 February 2021 14	AaB	2 – 3	F.C. København	Aalborg
20:00 CET	Thelander 10'; Hannesbo 39'	Report	Bartolec 53'; Stage 58'; Falk 79'	Stadium: Aalborg Portland Park; Attendance: 0 Referee: Mads-Kristoffer Kristoffersen

7 February 2021 15	Brøndby IF	1 – 1	AaB	Brøndbyvester
20:00 CET	Uhre 72' (pen.)	https://aabsport.dk/nyheder/2021/februar/pointdeling-mellem-aab-og-broendby-if/ Report]	Hannesbo 51'	Stadium: Brøndby Stadion; Attendance: 0 Referee: Morten Krogh

14 February 2021 16	AaB	0 – 0	Randers FC	Aalborg
14:00 CET	Granli (red card) 85'	Report		Stadium: Aalborg Portland Park; Attendance: 0 Referee: Michael Tykgaard

19 February 2021 17	AaB	0 – 2	FC Midtjylland	Aalborg
19:00 CET		Report	Kaba 27'; Evander 72'	Stadium: Aalborg Portland Park; Attendance: 0 Referee: Jørgen Daugbjerg Burchardt

28 February 2021 18	FC Nordsjælland	2 – 2	AaB	Farum
14:00 CET	Chukwuani 5'; Woledzi 67'	Report	Prica 22'; Fossum 77' (pen.)	Stadium: Right to Dream Park; Attendance: 0 Referee: Sandi Putros

3 March 2021 19	AC Horsens	2 – 1	AaB	Horsens
18:00 CET	Qamili 31'; Brock-Madsen 90+5'	Report	Ross 90'	Stadium: Casa Arena Horsens; Attendance: 0 Referee: Peter Kjærsgaard-Andersen

8 March 2021 20	AaB	1 – 0	SønderjyskE	Aalborg
19:00 CET	Fossum 90+3' (pen.)	Report		Stadium: Aalborg Portland Park; Attendance: 0 Referee: Aydin Uslu

14 March 2021 21	Vejle Boldklub	0 – 2	AaB	Vejle
14:00 CET		Report	van Weert 12'; Ahlmann 54'	Stadium: Vejle Stadion; Attendance: 0 Referee: Jakob Sundberg

21 March 2021 22	AaB	0 – 2	OB	Aalborg
17:00 CET		Report	Þrándarson 14'; Jebali 56'	Stadium: Aalborg Portland Park; Attendance: 0 Referee: Peter Kjærsgaard

==== Qualification round ====
Pos	Team	Pld	W	D	L	GF	GA	GD	Pts	Qualification or relegation	AAB	SON	ODE	VEJ	LYN	HOR
1	AaB	32	12	10	10	44	41	+3	46	Qualification for the European play-off match	—	3–2	3–2	2–1	4–0	1–1
2	SønderjyskE	32	13	5	14	45	48	−3	44		0–4	—	2–0	1–0	2–0	2–3
3	OB	32	11	10	11	40	39	+1	43		1–0	1–1	—	0–1	2–0	4–0
4	Vejle	32	9	11	12	42	50	−8	38		1–1	4–2	2–2	—	2–2	3–0
5	Lyngby (R)	32	6	8	18	36	63	−27	26	Relegation to Danish 1st Division	2–2	0–1	1–2	0–0	—	3–4
6	Horsens (R)	32	5	9	18	30	59	−29	24	Relegation to Danish 1st Division	1–0	1–2	1–1	3–3	1–3	—

Source: Danish Football Association (in Danish), Soccerway
Legend: Blue = home team win; Yellow = draw; Red = away team win.
Rules for classification: 1) Points; 2) Goal difference; 3) Goals scored; 4) Away goals scored; 5) Play-off (played on neutral ground if determining teams for different rounds); 6) Draw.
(R) Relegated

===== Matches =====
5 April 2021 23	AaB	3 – 2	SønderjyskE	Aalborg
14:00 CEST	Kusk 40'; Kanstrup 51' (o.g.); Rufo 84'	Report	Jacobsen 33' (pen.); Hassan 90+4'	Stadium: Aalborg Portland Park; Attendance: 0 Referee: Jonas Hansen

12 April 2021 24	Lyngby BK	2 – 2	AaB	Kongens Lyngby
19:00 CEST	Warming 63'; Nielsen 66'	Report	Ross 55'; Fossum 90+5'	Stadium: Lyngby Stadion; Attendance: 0 Referee: Morten Krogh

16 April 2021 25	Vejle Boldklub	1 – 1	AaB	Vejle
19:00 CEST	Sousa 51'	Report	Rufo 19'	Stadium: Vejle Stadion; Attendance: 0 Referee: Aydin Uslu

21 April 2021 26	AaB	3 – 2	OB	Aalborg
19:00 CEST	van Weert 8'; Fossum (penalty missed) 28'; Juel Andersen 55' (o.g.); Kusk (penalty missed) 73'; Prica 87'	Report	Okosun 66'; Juel Andersen 90+2'	Stadium: Aalborg Portland Park; Attendance: 2,627; Referee: Mikkel Redder

25 April 2021 27	AC Horsens	1 – 0	AaB	Horsens
14:00 CEST	Hansson 61'	Report		Stadium: Casa Arena Horsens; Attendance: 784; Referee: Michael Tykgaard

30 April 2021 28	AaB	4 – 0	Lyngby BK	Aalborg
18:05 CEST	Andersen 11' van Weert 45'; Prica 80', 88'	Report		Stadium: Aalborg Portland Park; Attendance: 3,369; Referee: Jørgen Daugbjerg Burchardt

7 May 2021 29	OB	1 – 0	AaB	Odense
19:00 CEST	Kadrii 45+1'	Report		Stadium: Nature Energy Park; Attendance: 4,083; Referee: Mads-Kristoffer Kristoffersen

16 May 2021 30	AaB	1 – 1	AC Horsens	Aalborg
14:00 CEST	Prica 64'; Prica (penalty missed) 87'	Report	Tengstedt 12'	Stadium: Aalborg Portland Park; Attendance: 3,277; Referee: Morten Krogh

19 May 2021 31	AaB	2 – 1	Vejle Boldklub	Aalborg
17:00 CEST	Onugkha 61' (o.g.) van Weert 73'	Report	Onugkha 45+1'; Saeid Ezatolahi (red card) 72'	Stadium: Aalborg Portland Park; Attendance: 3,273; Referee: Peter Kjærsgaard

24 May 2021 32	SønderjyskE	0 – 4	AaB	Haderslev
14:00 CEST		Report	van Weert 20'; Fossun 33' (pen.); Rufo 60'; Ahlmann 69'	Stadium: Sydbank Park; Attendance: 3,011; Referee: Jørgen Daugbjerg Burchardt

=== Superliga European play-off ===
28 May 2021 Play-off	AGF	2 – 2 (3 – 1 p)	AaB	Aarhus
19:00 CEST	Blume 20'; Þorsteinsson 120' (pen.)	Report	van Weert 69' (pen.); Kusk 109'	Stadium: Ceres Park; Attendance: 8,083; Referee: Jens Grabski Maae
	Penalties
	Þorsteinsson (penalty scored); Diks (penalty scored); Links (penalty missed); Jevtović (penalty scored)		(penalty missed) Kusk; (penalty scored) Hiljemark; (penalty missed) Thelander; (penalty missed) Samuelsen

=== Danish Cup ===
11 November 2020 3rd round	AB (2)	1 – 2	AaB	Gladsaxe
17:00 CET	Kisum 10'; Seeger-Hansen (penalty missed) 54'	Report	Okore 24'; Kusk 40'	Stadium: Gladsaxe Stadion; Attendance: 400; Referee: Benjamin Helm Svedborg

8 December 2020 4th round	B.93 (2)	1 – 0	AaB	Farum^{1}
17:00 CET	Bany 30'	Report	Prica (red card) 90+4'	Stadium: Right to Dream Park; Attendance: 400; Referee: Jakob Sundberg

- Note 1: The match was moved away from B.93's normal ground, Østerbro Stadion, by authorities in Copenhagen Municipality.

== Statistics ==
=== Appearances ===
As of 14 February 2021

This includes all competitive matches. The list is sorted by shirt number when appearances are equal.

Rnk	Pos	No.	Player	Superliga	Danish Cup	Total
1	DF	2	(Denmark) Kristoffer Pallesen	16	2	18
2	FW	9	(Netherlands) Tom van Weert	15	2	17
2	FW	17	(Denmark) Kasper Kusk	15	2	17
4	GK	1	(Sweden) Jacob Rinne	16	0	16
4	MF	6	(Portugal) Pedro Ferreira	15	1	16
4	MF	8	(Norway) Iver Fossum	15	1	16
7	DF	3	(Denmark) Jakob Ahlmann	14	1	15
7	DF	5	(Denmark) Jores Okore	13	2	15
7	MF	25	(Denmark) Frederik Børsting	13	2	15
7	DF	31	(Norway) Daniel Granli	14	1	15
11	FW	11	(Sweden) Tim Prica	11	2	13
11	FW	19	(France) Timothé Nkada	11	2	13
11	DF	26	(Denmark) Rasmus Thelander	12	1	13
14	DF	4	(Denmark) Mathias Ross	10	2	12
14	DF	15	(Denmark) Lukas Klitten	11	1	12
16	FW	10	(Denmark) Lucas Andersen	10	1	11
17	MF	23	(Uganda) Robert Kakeeto	7	1	8
18	MF	14	(Denmark) Malthe Højholt	4	2	6
19	MF	7	(Sweden) Oscar Hiljemark	5	0	5
20	MF	16	(Denmark) Magnus Christensen	4	0	4
21	GK	22	(Denmark) Andreas Hansen	1	2	3
21	FW	35	(Denmark) Marcus Hannesbo	3	0	3
23	FW	18	(Norway) Martin Samuelsen	2	0	2
23	MF	20	(Denmark) Oliver Klitten	2	0	2
25	MF	28	(Denmark) Jeppe Pedersen	0	1	1
25	FW	30	(Spain) Rufo	1	0	1
25	DF	32	(Denmark) Kasper Pedersen	1	0	1

=== Goalscorers ===
As of 14 February 2021

This includes all competitive matches. The list is sorted by shirt number when total goals are equal.

Rnk	Pos	No.	Player	Superliga	Danish Cup	Total
1	MF	8	(Norway) Iver Fossum	5	0	5
2	FW	9	(Netherlands) Tom van Weert	3	0	3
2	FW	17	(Denmark) Kasper Kusk	2	1	3
4	DF	5	(Denmark) Jores Okore	1	1	2
4	MF	25	(Denmark) Frederik Børsting	2	0	2
4	FW	35	(Denmark) Marcus Hannesbo	2	0	2
7	DF	3	(Denmark) Jakob Ahlmann	1	0	1
7	MF	7	(Sweden) Oscar Hiljemark	1	0	1
7	DF	26	(Denmark) Rasmus Thelander	1	0	1
TOTALS				18	2	20

=== Assists ===
As of 14 February 2021

This includes all competitive matches. The list is sorted by shirt number when total assists are equal.

Rnk	Pos	No.	Player	Superliga	Danish Cup	Total
1	FW	11	(Sweden) Tim Prica	2	1	3
2	DF	2	(Denmark) Kristoffer Pallesen	2	0	2
2	DF	3	(Denmark) Jakob Ahlmann	2	0	2
2	MF	6	(Portugal) Pedro Ferreira	2	0	2
2	FW	17	(Denmark) Kasper Kusk	2	0	2
6	DF	5	(Denmark) Jores Okore	1	0	1
6	MF	8	(Norway) Iver Fossum	1	0	1
6	FW	9	(Netherlands) Tom van Weert	1	0	1
6	FW	10	(Denmark) Lucas Andersen	1	0	1
6	DF	31	(Norway) Daniel Granli	0	1	1
TOTALS				14	2	16

=== Clean sheets ===
As of 14 February 2021

This includes all competitive matches. The list is sorted by shirt number when total clean sheets are equal.

Rnk	Pos	No.	Player	Superliga	Danish Cup	Total
1	GK	1	(Sweden) Jacob Rinne	4	0	4
TOTALS				4	0	4

=== Disciplinary record ===
As of 14 February 2021

This includes all competitive matches. The list is sorted by shirt number when total cards are equal.

Rnk	Pos.	No.	Player	Superliga		Danish Cup		Total	
Rnk	Pos.	No.	Player	Yellow card	Red card	Yellow card	Red card	Yellow card	Red card
1	FW	11	(Sweden) Tim Prica	0	1	1	1	1	2
2	DF	31	(Norway) Daniel Granli	1	1	1	0	2	1
3	MF	6	(Portugal) Pedro Ferreira	7	0	1	0	8	0
4	DF	3	(Denmark) Jakob Ahlmann	3	0	0	0	3	0
4	DF	5	(Denmark) Jores Okore	2	0	1	0	3	0
6	DF	2	(Denmark) Kristoffer Pallesen	1	0	1	0	2	0
6	MF	7	(Sweden) Oscar Hiljemark	2	0	0	0	2	0
6	MF	23	(Uganda) Robert Kakeeto	2	0	0	0	2	0
6	DF	26	(Denmark) Rasmus Thelander	2	0	0	0	2	0
10	DF	4	(Denmark) Mathias Ross	1	0	0	0	1	0
10	FW	9	(Netherlands) Tom van Weert	1	0	0	0	1	0
10	MF	14	(Denmark) Malthe Højholt	1	0	0	0	1	0
10	DF	15	(Denmark) Lukas Klitten	1	0	0	0	1	0
10	AC	–	(Denmark) Rasmus Würtz	1	0	0	0	1	0
TOTALS				23	2	5	1	28	3

=== Suspensions ===
As of 14 February 2021

This includes all competitive matches. The list is sorted by shirt number when total matches suspended are equal.

Rnk	Pos	No.	Player	Superliga	Danish Cup	Total
1	FW	11	(Sweden) Tim Prica	3	0	3
2	MF	6	(Portugal) Pedro Ferreira	1	0	1
TOTALS				4	0	4

== Awards ==
=== Team ===
Award	Month	Source

=== Individual ===
No.	Player	Award	Month	Source
