= 2020 Danish Cup final =

2020 Sydbank Pokalen final
- Event: 2019–20 Danish Cup
SønderjyskE	AaB
2	0
- Date: 1 July 2020
- Venue: Blue Water Arena, Esbjerg
- Man of the Match: Anders Jacobsen
- Referee: Jørgen Daugberg Burchardt
- Attendance: 1,750
- Weather: 17˚C/63˚F, Passing Clouds, 59% Humidity

The 2020 Danish Cup final was played on 1 July 2020 between SønderjyskE and AaB at Blue Water Arena, Esbjerg, a neutral ground. The final was the culmination of the 2019–20 Danish Cup, the 66th season of the Sydbank Pokalen. Originally scheduled to be played in May, the final was delayed due to the COVID-19 shutdown through Europe.

SønderjyskE won its first major championship of any kind in its 13-year history, beating AaB 2–0. It was SønderjyskE's first ever appearance in the Danish Cup final. AaB appeared in its 12th Pokalen final, having previously won the cup in 1966, 1970 and 2014, finishing as runners-up for the 9th time, adding 2020 to its second-place runs in 1967, 1987, 1991, 1993, 1999, 2000, 2004 and 2009.

By virtue of its victory, SønderjyskE earns a place in at least the second qualifying round of the 2020–21 UEFA Europa League.

== Teams ==
Team	Previous finals appearances (bold indicates winners)
SønderjyskE	0
AaB	11 (**1966**, 1967, **1970**, 1987, 1991, 1993, 1999, 2000, 2004, 2009, **2014**)

== Venue ==
In just third time in cup history, the final was played in a venue other than the Copenhagen Sports Park (1955–1990), or Parken Stadium (1993–2019). Blue Water Arena in Esbjerg hosted its first ever Sydbank Pokalen final in 2020. Odense Stadium hosted the 1991 final while the 1992 final was played at Aarhus Idrætspark.

== Route to the final ==
Note: In all results below, the score of the finalist is given first (H: home; A: away).

SønderjyskE		Round	AaB	
Opponent	Result		Opponent	Result
Bye		First round	Bye	
Boldklubben Viktoria	5–0 (A)	Second round	Nørresundby FB	8–0 (A)
Hvidovre IF	4–2 (A)	Third round	Vejgaard BK	6–0 (A)
Brøndby IF	1–0 (A)	Fourth round	HB Køge	3–0 (A)
Randers FC	2–1 (A)	Quarterfinals	F.C. København	2–0 (H)
AC Horsens	2–1 (H)	Semifinals	AGF	3–2 (H)

== Effects of COVID-19 ==
In addition to the scheduling changes caused by the national COVID-19 shutdown, the final match was delayed for 14 minutes in the first half due to a group of fans not adhering to social distancing guidelines.

The limited capacity crowd of 1,750 (10% of capacity) included an allotment of 725 tickets for each team's fan base, provided they sat 2 meters apart. Just before the 30-minute mark of the first half, a group of Ultras from AaB had grouped together and refused to move, despite pleas from the club's coaches and other fans. This group was subsequently ejected from the stadium and, after a 14-minute delay, the game resumed.

== Match ==
=== Details ===
1 July 2020
20:00

SønderjyskE (1)	2–0	AaB (1)
Eskesen (yellow card) 23' (yellow-red card) 65'; Jónsson (yellow card) 32'; Jacobsen 38', 56'; Bah (yellow card) 46'; Jakobsen (yellow card) 49'; Banggaard (yellow card) 75'	Report	Okore (yellow card) 13'; Christensen (yellow card) 21'; Ross (yellow card) 71'

Blue Water Arena, Esbjerg
Attendance: 1,750
Referee: Jørgen Daugbjerg Burchardt

**SønderjyskE**	**AaB**

GK	28	(Germany) Sebastian Mielitz
DF	12	(Denmark) Pierre Kanstrup
DF	2	(Denmark) Stefan Gartenmann
MF	6	(Iceland) Eggert Jónsson	(substituted off) 63' (yellow card) 32'
MF	90	(Denmark) Mads Albæk	(substituted off) 87'
MF	8	(Denmark) Christian Jakobsen	(substituted off) 76' (yellow card) 49'
MF	7	(Denmark) Julius Eskesen	(yellow card) 23' (yellow-red card) 65'
MF	9	(Denmark) Alexander Bah	(yellow card) 46'
MF	29	(Cameroon) Victor Ekani	(substituted off) 87'
FW	15	(Denmark) Johan Absalonsen
FW	10	(Denmark) Anders Jacobsen	38' (Absalonsen) 56' (Alexander Bah)
Substitutes:
DF	26	(Denmark) Patrick Banggaard	(substituted on) 63' (yellow card) 75'
MF	77	(Nigeria) Rilwan Hassan	(substituted on) 76'
MF	22	(Denmark) Emil Frederiksen	(substituted on) 87'
MF	24	(Denmark) Rasmus Vinderslev	(substituted on) 87'
FW	47	(Ukraine) Artem Dovbyk
GK	1	(Croatia) Nikola Mirković
FW	20	(Denmark) Peter Christiansen
Coach:
(Denmark) Glen Riddersholm

GK	22	(Denmark) Andres Hansen
DF	3	(Denmark) Jakob Nielsen	(substituted off) 59'
DF	26	(Denmark) Rasmus Thelander
DF	5	(Denmark) Jores Okore	(yellow card) 13'
DF	6	(Denmark) Kristoffer Pallesen	(substituted off) 81'
MF	17	(Denmark) Kasper Kusk
MF	21	(Denmark) Patrick Olsen
MF	10	(Denmark) Lucas Andersen	(substituted off) 42'
MF	8	(Norway) Iver Fossum
MF	16	(Denmark) Magnus Christensen	(substituted off) 46' (yellow card) 21'
FW	9	(Netherlands) Tom van Weert	(substituted off) 59'
Substitutes:
MF	27	(Denmark) Søren Tengstedt	(substituted on) 42'
MF	23	(Uganda) Robert Kakeeto	(substituted on) 46'
MF	25	(Denmark) Frederik Børsting	(substituted on) 59'
DF	24	(Denmark) Mathias Ross	(substituted on) 59' (yellow card) 71'
DF	2	(Denmark) Patrick Kristensen	(substituted on) 81'
GK	1	(Sweden) Jacob Rinne
DF	32	(Denmark) Kasper Pedersen
Coach:
(Denmark) Jacob Friis

Assistant referees: Heine Sørensen, Amir Sabic

**Match rules**

- 90 minutes.
- 30 minutes of extra time if necessary.
- Penalty shoot-out if scores still level.
- Seven named substitutes, of which up to five may be used.
