= Mads Albæk =

Danish footballer (born 1990)

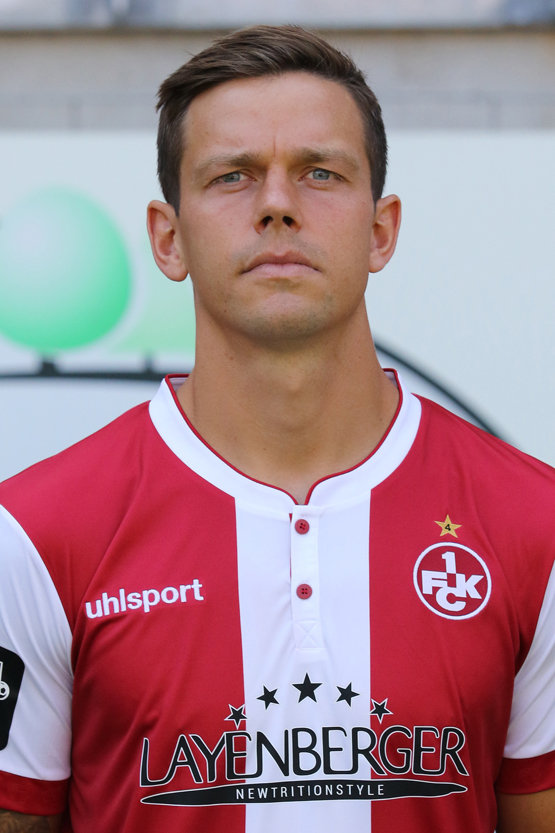
- Albæk with 1. FC Kaiserslautern in July 2018

Personal information
- Full name: Mads Winther Albæk
- Date of birth: 14 January 1990 (age 36)
- Place of birth: Roskilde, Denmark
- Height: 1.82 m (6 ft 0 in)
- Position: Midfielder

Team information
- Current team: Ikast FS (Manager)

Youth career
- Hvalsø
- 1996–2001: Gadstrup
- 2001–2004: Herfølge
- 2004–2008: Midtjylland

Senior career*
Years	Team	Apps	(Gls)
2008–2013	Midtjylland	120	(12)
2013–2015	Reims	39	(2)
2015–2017	IFK Göteborg	48	(9)
2017–2019	1. FC Kaiserslautern	29	(1)
2019–2023	SønderjyskE	107	(7)
2023–2024	Randers	15	(0)
2024–2026	Weiche Flensburg	35	(0)
Total		393	(31)

International career
2006–2007	Denmark U17	10	(0)
2007–2009	Denmark U19	14	(2)
2009–2012	Denmark U21	26	(5)

Managerial career
- 2026–: Ikast FS
- * Club domestic league appearances and goals

Mads Albæk (born 14 January 1990) is a former Danish professional footballer who played as a midfielder. He is the manager of Ikast FS.

He has also represented the Danish national under-21 team.

== Youth career ==
Born in Roskilde, Albæk began his footballing career started in the small Zealandic club, Gadstrup IF. At the age of 11, he moved to play for Herfølge Boldklub. When playing for Herfølge's youth team, Albæk was on trial at SC Heerenveen from the Netherlands, and later on, he was tested by Tottenham Hotspur from England. His talent was discovered by the Danish Superliga club FC Midtjylland, who brought Albæk through the ranks of their youth academy.

== Club career ==
=== FC Midtjylland ===
Albæk signed his first professional contract in January 2008, and was permanently promoted in the first team squad. However, he continued playing games for the U19 squad, while training with the first team. In the summer 2008, Albæk suffered from a twist in the knee and that resulted in an operation. Due to the injury, he debuted in February 2009 in a match against Esbjerg fB where he played the whole match. Albæk extended his contract in March 2010 until the summer 2014. He played 28 league matches in this season despite his young age.

Having established himself as a starter in the Midtjylland line-up, and he revealed in January 2013, that he would like to leave the club and take the step up. However, he wasn't sold in this transfer windows. Albæk was named as the player of the year 2012/13. With one year left of his contract, he left the club in the summer windows 2013.

=== Reims ===
Albæk had several interested club, but decided to join French side Stade de Reims in the summer of 2013.

He got his debut for the club on 17 August 2013. Albæk played the whole match and scored a goal in the 7th minute, helping his team win 2–1 against Lille. However, besides his good first match, the rest of the season wasn't so good. He didn't fit in and did only score two goals in 27 league matches.

Albæk suffered from a stomach injury October 2014, that resulted in an operation in December that held him out for some months. He went back from this injury in April 2015.

=== IFK Göteborg ===
In August 2015, Albæk signed a two-year contract with Swedish team IFK Göteborg. He played his first match for the club only 5 days later against BK Häcken.

According to a Swedish media, IFK Göteborg rejected a bid from MLS-club Toronto FC for Albæk in January 2017.

=== Sønderjyske ===
On 20 June 2019, Albæk signed with Danish Superliga club Sønderjyske on a four-year deal. On July 20, 2020, he was part of the historic triumph when Sønderjyske won the 2020 Danish Cup final for the first time ever.

=== Randers ===
He left Sønderjyske in the beginning of Summer 2023, and joined Superliga club Randers FC on a one-year deal.

=== Later career ===
On 2 July 2024, Albæk joined German Regionalliga club SC Weiche Flensburg 08. In January 2026, while he was still playing for German club Weiche Flensburg, Albæk was also appointed as manager of the Danish Jutland Series club Ikast FC.

On 7 May 2026, Albæk announced his retirement from football.

== International career ==
Albæk has played for various national youth sides, and he was rewarded with the Arla U17 youth prize.

== Honours ==
SønderjyskE

- Danish Cup: 2019–20
