= Thomas Bælum =

Danish footballer (born 1978)

Personal information
- Full name: Thomas Bælum
- Date of birth: 5 June 1978 (age 48)
- Place of birth: Aalborg, Denmark
- Height: 1.85 m (6 ft 1 in)
- Position: Centre back

Youth career
- Aalborg Chang

Senior career*
Years	Team	Apps	(Gls)
1996–2003	AaB	179	(0)
2004–2006	MSV Duisburg	77	(3)
2006–2008	Willem II	62	(1)
2009–2011	Silkeborg	22	(0)
2011	Grauballe UGF		

International career
1997–1999	Denmark U21	18	(0)
- * Club domestic league appearances and goals as of July 10, 2011

Thomas Bælum (born 5 June 1978) is a Danish former professional footballer who played as a defender. He is currently chief executive and caretaking sports director for AaB. Bælum has played 18 games for the Danish national U21 team.

== Career ==
Born in Aalborg, Bælum made his debut in professional football with local club Aalborg Boldspilklub (AaB) in the 1996–97 Superliga season. He helped AaB win the 1998–99 Superliga championship, as well as reaching two Danish Cup finals. In the winter 2003, he moved abroad to play for MSV Duisburg in Germany. He helped Duisburg win promotion for the top-flight Bundesliga in the summer 2005. When Duisburg were swiftly relegated back into the 2. Bundesliga in the summer 2006, he moved to Dutch club Willem II Tilburg in the Eredivisie where he spent two seasons, playing 62 league games and scoring one goal. Bælum was signed by the Danish second level side Silkeborg IF in the summer of 2008.

== Honours ==
- Danish Superliga: 1998–99
