= Vladimir Prijović =

Serbian footballer (born 2002)

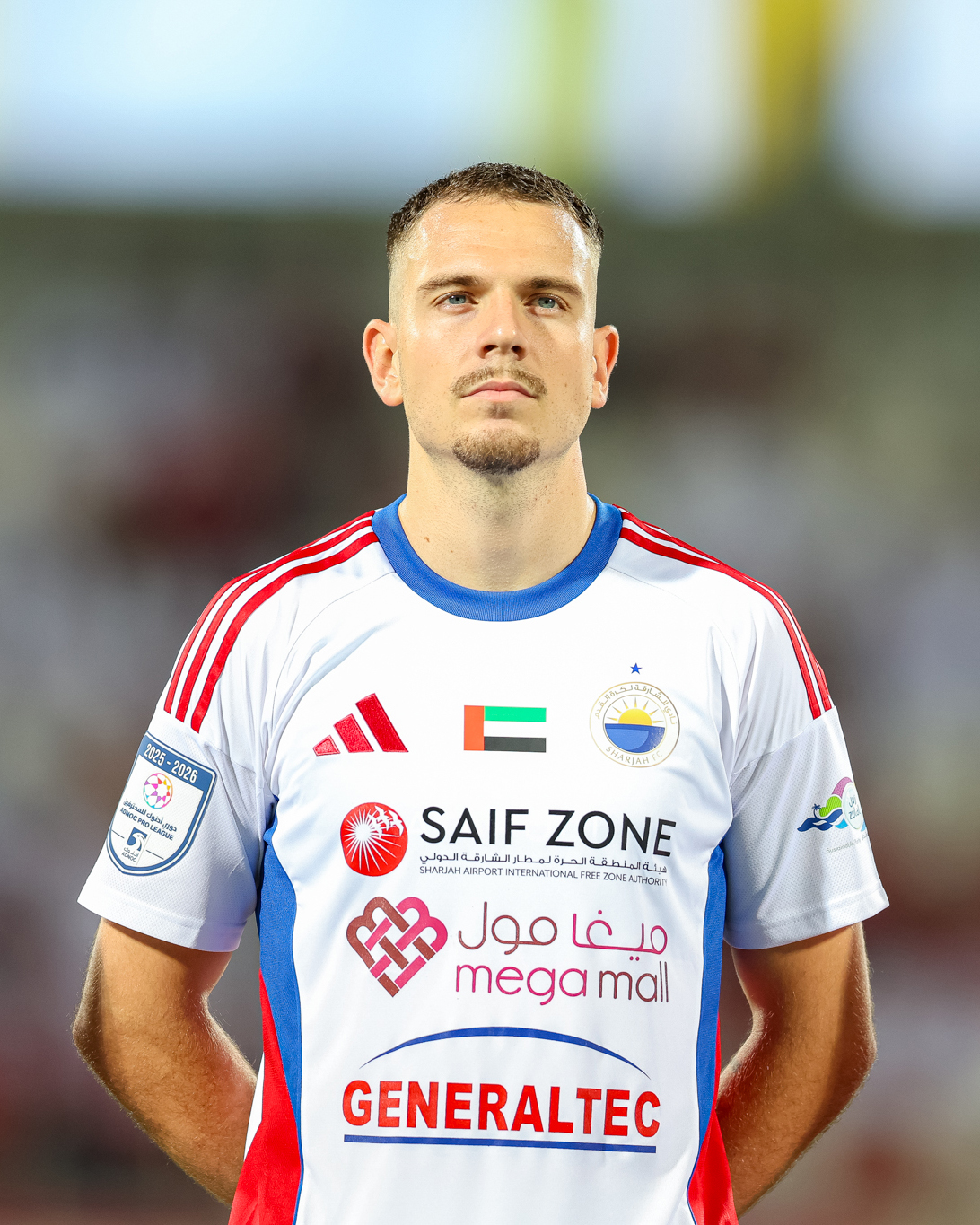
- Prijović in 2026

Personal information
- Full name: Vladimir Prijović
- Date of birth: 26 June 2002 (age 24)
- Place of birth: Priboj, Serbia and Montenegro
- Height: 1.85 m (6 ft 1 in)
- Position: Left-back

Team information
- Current team: Sharjah FC
- Number: 33

Youth career
- –2020: Red Star Belgrade
- 2020–2021: AaB

Senior career*
Years	Team	Apps	(Gls)
2019–2020	→ Grafičar (loan)	1	(0)
2021–2022	AaB	2	(0)
2022–2023	Napredak Kruševac	19	(1)
2023–2025	Spartak Subotica	50	(1)
2025–	Sharjah FC	6	(0)

International career
2016–2017	Serbia U15	4	(0)
2017	Serbia U-16	4	(0)
2018	Serbia U-17	2	(0)
2024	Serbia U-21	1	(0)
- * Club domestic league appearances and goals as of 21:32, 25 January 2026 (UTC)

Vladimir Prijović (born 26 June 2002) is a Serbian professional footballer who plays as a left-back for Sharjah FC.

== Career ==
=== Club career ===
Prijović is a product of Red Star Belgrade. He was loaned out to Grafičar in the 2019-20 season, where he made one appearance for the club in the Serbian First League.

On 11 August 2020, Danish Superliga club AaB bought 18-year old Prijović for a fee around €210.000, with the player signing a four-year deal. In his first season at the club, Prijović only played for AaB's U-19 squad and reserve team. He made a total of two appearances for the Danish club, both in the Danish Superliga in 2021-22.

On 27 July 2022, Prijović returned to his homeland, as he signed with Napredak Kruševac. On 31 August 2023, Spartak Subotica confirmed the signing of Prijović on a three-year deal with an option for one further year.
