= Tom van Weert =

Dutch footballer (born 1990)

Personal information
- Date of birth: 7 June 1990 (age 36)
- Place of birth: Sint-Michielsgestel, Netherlands
- Height: 1.83 m (6 ft 0 in)
- Position: Forward

Youth career
- RKVV Sint-Michielsgestel
- Den Bosch

Senior career*
Years	Team	Apps	(Gls)
2008–2014	Den Bosch	97	(41)
2014–2016	Excelsior	64	(24)
2016–2018	Groningen	48	(17)
2018–2021	AaB	91	(31)
2021–2022	Volos	34	(18)
2022–2024	AEK Athens	19	(6)
2024-2026	Atromitos	41	(3)
- * Club domestic league appearances and goals as of 5 October 2026

Tom van Weert (born 7 June 1990) is a Dutch former professional footballer who played as a forward

== Career ==
=== Den Bosch ===
Van Weert made his debut in professional football in the Eerste Divisie for Den Bosch on 5 December 2008 in a match against PEC Zwolle. On 6 March 2009, he scored his first senior goal in a 7–1 win over Eindhoven. In the 2010–11 season he grew into a regular starter for the club. Van Weert suffered a serious injury during a match against Eindhoven on 28 April 2013, with the MRI scan revealing that he had torn off his anterior cruciate ligament. Due to this injury, he was only able to make his comeback in the play-offs of the 2013–14 season.

=== Excelsior ===
On 10 June 2014, Excelsior announced that they had signed van Weert on a transfer. At Excelsior, he took over after Lars Veldwijk who had moved to Nottingham Forest. He made his debut for the Rotterdam club in the first game of the season, on 9 August against NAC Breda, match which finished 1–1. A week later, he scored his first goal for Excelsior against Go Ahead Eagles. Van Weert played two seasons for Excelsior, who both years finished in fifteenth place in the Eredivisie, one place ahead of relegation. He contributed avoiding relegation by scoring thirteen and eleven goals, respectively, in his two seasons there.

=== Groningen ===
Van Weert signed a three-year contract with Groningen in June 2016, coming over on a free. He made 112 appearances for the club, in which he scored 41 goals.

=== AaB ===
On 29 August 2019, van Weert signed a three-year contract with Danish Superliga club AaB. He later revealed that he also had offers from Portuguese club Sporting CP, but that chaotic circumstances in the club meant that the move did not go through.

=== Volos ===
On 25 June 2021, Van Weert was announced by the Greek top-level club Volos. By early January 2022, he had emerged as his team's leader, having scored ten goals and leading the top scorers table.

=== AEK Athens ===
On 7 September 2022, he joined the Greek giants AEK Athens on a two-year deal. On 11 September, he made his debut with the club, coming off as a substitute in a match against rivals Panathinaikos. 11 days after his debut, he suffered a fracture, that would put him aside for two months. He returned in action on 16 December in a cup game against Kifisia, where he scored his first goal for AEK, from the penalty spot. On the 21st, he came off as a substitute in the 60th minute, in a match against Lamia, that was still 0–0. He scored a brace helping his team secure the victory. This led to coach Matías Almeyda, having no other option but to start him in the next game against Volos, his previous club, where he scored again.

=== Atromitos ===
On 10 June 2024, van Weert joined fellow Super League Greece club Atromitos on a two-year contract.

In October 2026, he announced his retirement from football.

== Career statistics ==
As of match played 18 February 2024

Appearances and goals by club, season and competition
Club	Season	League			National cup (Note: Includes KNVB Cup, Danish Cup, Greek Cup)		Other		Total	
Club	Season	Division	Apps	Goals	Apps	Goals	Apps	Goals	Apps	Goals
Den Bosch	2008–09	Eerste Divisie	14	2	—		—		14	2
Den Bosch	2009–10	Eerste Divisie	11	0	1	0	1 (Note: Appearances in Eerste Divisie promotion play-offs)	0	13	0
Den Bosch	2010–11	Eerste Divisie	20	6	1	0	3	0	24	6
Den Bosch	2011–12	Eerste Divisie	20	15	2	2	6	1	28	18
Den Bosch	2012–13	Eerste Divisie	32	17	4	2	—		36	19
Den Bosch	2013–14	Eerste Divisie	1	0	—		2	0	3	0
Den Bosch	Total		98	40	8	4	12	1	118	45
Excelsior	2014–15	Eredivisie	32	13	4	3	—		36	16
Excelsior	2015–16	Eredivisie	32	11	2	4	—		34	15
Excelsior	Total		64	24	6	7	—		70	31
Groningen	2016–17	Eredivisie	15	5	2	1	2 (Note: Appearances in Eredivisie play-offs)	0	19	6
Groningen	2017–18	Eredivisie	31	12	2	0	—		33	12
Groningen	2018–19	Eredivisie	2	0	—		—		2	0
Groningen	Total		48	17	4	1	2	0	54	18
AaB	2018–19	Danish Superliga	25	8	3	3	—		28	11
AaB	2019–20	Danish Superliga	24	10	5	1	—		29	11
AaB	2020–21	Danish Superliga	32	9	2	0	—		34	9
AaB	Total		81	27	10	4	—		91	31
Volos	2021–22	Super League Greece	31	17	3	0	—		34	17
Volos	2022–23	Super League Greece	3	1	—		—		3	1
Volos	Total		34	18	3	0	—		37	18
AEK Athens	2022–23	Super League Greece	13	5	4	1	—		17	6
AEK Athens	2023–24	Super League Greece	6	1	1	0	—		7	1
AEK Athens	Total		19	6	4	1	—		23	7
Career total			345	130	36	17	14	1	394	149

== Honours ==
AEK Athens

- Super League Greece: 2022–23
- Greek Cup: 2022–23

=== Individual ===
- Volos Player of the Season: 2021–22
- Super League Greece top scorer: 2021–22
- Super League Greece Player of the Month: December 2022
- Super League Greece Team of the Season: 2021–22
