= Oliver Klitten =

Danish footballer (born 2000)

Personal information
- Full name: Oliver Augustus Sparre Klitten
- Date of birth: 1 May 2000 (age 26)
- Place of birth: Aalborg, Denmark
- Position: Left winger

Team information
- Current team: Hobro
- Number: 7

Youth career
- Skalborg Sportsklub
- AaB

Senior career*
Years	Team	Apps	(Gls)
2019–2023	AaB	23	(0)
2020	→ Haugesund (loan)	5	(0)
2021–2022	→ Hobro (loan)	32	(6)
2022–2023	→ Helsingør (loan)	27	(1)
2023–	Hobro	91	(11)

International career
2018–2019	Denmark U-19	15	(2)
- * Club domestic league appearances and goals as of 2 June 2026

Oliver Augustus Sparre Klitten (born 1 May 2000) is a Danish professional footballer who plays as a left winger for Hobro IK.

== Club career ==
=== AaB ===
Klitten had his first experience AaB's first-team squad on 29 April 2018, where he was on the bench against FC Midtjylland in the Danish Superliga. In January 2019, Klitten was a part of first team squad, that went to Turkey on a training camp. On 26 April 2019, he made his debut for AaB, coming off the bench with two minutes remaining against Hobro IK.

Klitten and his twin brother, Lukas, were promoted to the first team squad for the 2019–20 season.

==== Loan spells ====
On 1 October 2020, Klitten was loaned out to Norwegian club FK Haugesund until the end of 2021. However, after only 92 minutes of playing time spread over 5 matches, the loan deal was terminated on 31 December 2020 and Klitten returned to AaB.

In order to gain playing time, Klitten was loaned out to Danish 1st Division club Hobro IK on 22 July 2021, for the 2021–22 season. After returning from Hobro, Klitten was once again loaned out; this time to FC Helsingør until the end of the 2022–23 season, where his contract with AaB also would expire.

=== Return to Hobro IK ===
On 14 June 2023 Danish 1st Division club Hobro IK confirmed, that Klitten had returned to his former club on a deal until June 2026.

== Personal life ==
Oliver has a twin brother, Lukas Klitten, who also is a football player.
