= Marcus Hannesbo =

Danish footballer (born 2002)

Personal information
- Full name: Marcus Serup Hannesbo
- Date of birth: 11 May 2002 (age 24)
- Place of birth: Støvring, Denmark
- Height: 1.84 m (6 ft 0 in)
- Position: Left midfielder

Team information
- Current team: Vendsyssel
- Number: 11

Youth career
- –2013: Støvring IF
- 2013–2021: AaB

Senior career*
Years	Team	Apps	(Gls)
2021–2023	AaB	29	(2)
2022	→ Fredericia (loan)	12	(0)
2022–2023	→ Horsens (loan)	10	(0)
2023–	Vendsyssel	56	(2)

International career
2020	Denmark U19	1	(0)
2021	Denmark U20	2	(0)
- * Club domestic league appearances and goals as of 18 June 2026

Marcus Serup Hannesbo (born 11 May 2002) is a Danish professional footballer who plays as a midfielder for Danish 1st Division club Vendsyssel.

== Club career ==
A product of the AaB academy, which he joined from hometown club Støvring IF in 2013, Hannesbo made his Danish Superliga debut for AaB on 3 February 2021 in a game against F.C. Copenhagen and scored a goal on his debut. He scored his second goal four days later against Brøndby IF.

On 31 January 2022, Hannesbo joined Danish 1st Division club FC Fredericia on a loan deal until the end of the season. On 8 July 2022, Hannesbo was loaned out again, this time to newly promoted Danish Superliga club AC Horsens.

In July 2023, Hannesbo joined Vendsyssel FF on a deal until June 2026.
