= Jeppe Pedersen =

Danish footballer (born 2001)

Personal information
- Full name: Jeppe Pedersen
- Date of birth: 3 March 2001 (age 25)
- Place of birth: Hirtshals, Denmark
- Height: 1.80 m (5 ft 11 in)
- Position: Midfielder

Team information
- Current team: KA
- Number: 8

Youth career
- –2016: Hirtshals BK
- 2016–2020: AaB

Senior career*
Years	Team	Apps	(Gls)
2019–2024	AaB	8	(1)
2021	→ Skive (loan)	16	(2)
2021–2022	→ Vendsyssel (loan)	27	(1)
2023–2024	→ Kolding (loan)	10	(0)
2024–2025	Vestri	34	(3)
2026–	KA	26	(1)

International career
2016–2017	Denmark U16	9	(2)
2017–2018	Denmark U17	13	(0)
2018–2019	Denmark U18	7	(0)
2019	Denmark U19	3	(2)
- * Club domestic league appearances and goals as of 16 November 2026

Jeppe Pedersen (born 3 March 2001) is a Danish professional footballer who plays as a midfielder for Icelandic club KA.

== Career ==
=== AaB ===
Born in Hirtshals, Pedersen started his career at Hirtshals Boldklub, before joining AaB in 2016. He made his way up through the youth ranks and was already on the bench for a Danish Superliga game in May 2018.

In the 2018–19 season, he was a part of the U-19 squad, while he got his official debut for AaB on 11 September 2019 against Nørresundby FB in the Danish Cup. He also played in the following cup match later that month, and later that season, sat on the bench in a number of Danish Superliga matches, before making his league debut on 23 July 2020 against FC Copenhagen. He also played in the following match against FC Midtjylland. Six months before then, in January 2020, Pedersen had been promoted to the first team squad.

After only two games on the bench for AaB in the first half of the 2020–21 season, Pedersen went on trial at Kolding IF, but the young midfielder failed to secure a deal. After only two games on the bench for AaB, Pedersen was loaned out in January 2021 to Danish 1st Division side Skive IK until the end of the season. Here, he made 16 appearances and scored two goals. Ahead of the 2021–22 season, Pedersen was once again loaned out, this time to Vendsyssel FF for the whole season, and at the same time extended his contract with AaB until June 2023. He made 27 appearances for Vendsyssel, before returning to AaB ahead of the 2022–23 season.

On 12 January 2023, Pedersen signed a new deal with AaB until June 2025. From here, and one year on, Pedersen only appeared in 10 matches. In pursuit of more playing time, he was therefore loaned out to Kolding IF on 30 January 2024 until the end of the year.

=== Vestri ===
On 10 August 2024, both AaB and Vestri confirmed that Pedersen exchanged his rental agreement in Kolding IF for a permanent deal with Vestri. On 22 August 2025, he won the Icelandic Cup after scoring the only goal in Vestri's 1–0 win against heavy favorites Valur.

== Honours ==
Vestri

- Icelandic Men's Football Cup: 2025
