= Andreas Hansen (footballer) =

Danish footballer (born 1995)

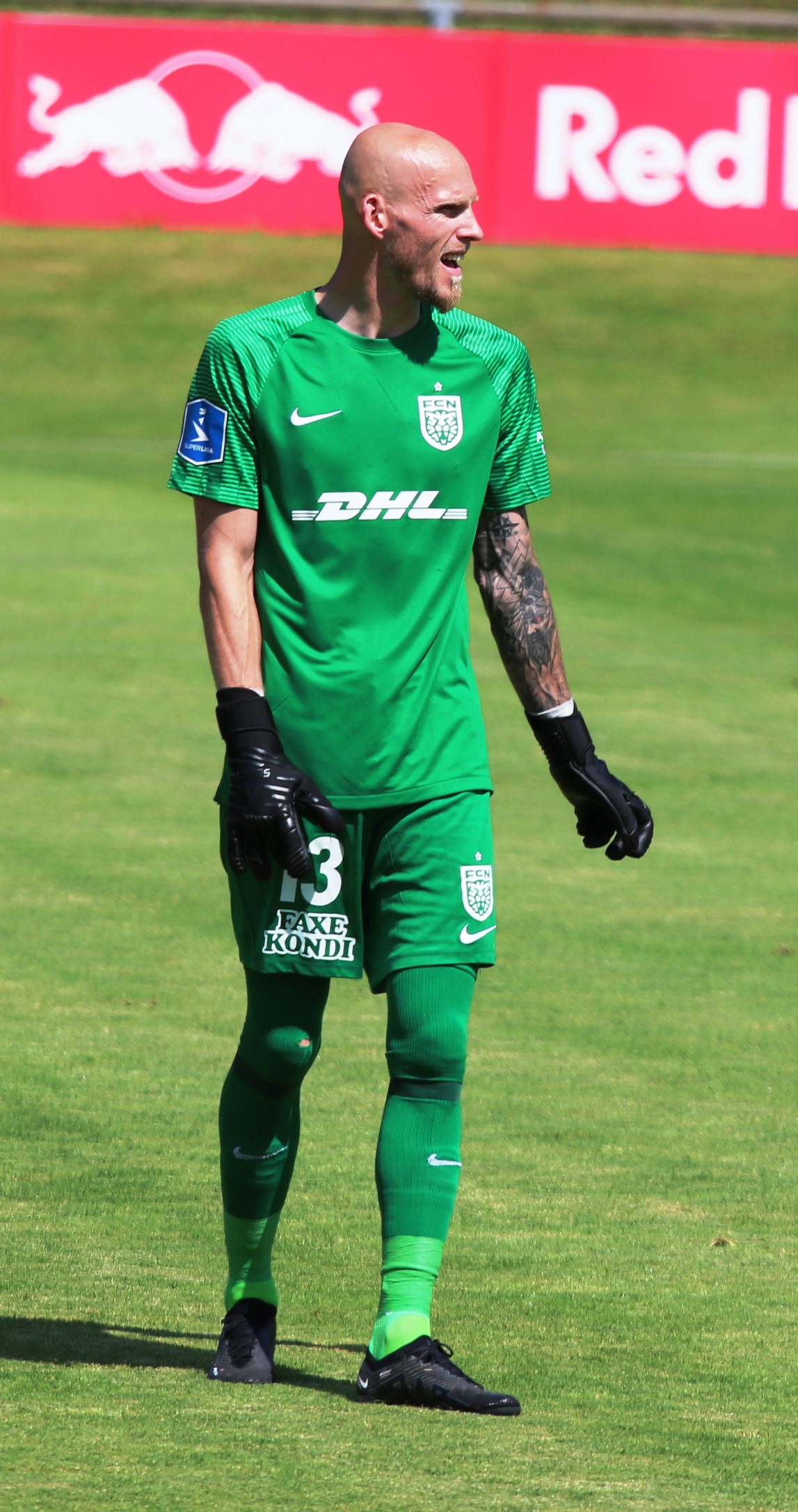
- Hansen in 2023 with Nordsjælland

Personal information
- Full name: Andreas Hansen
- Date of birth: 11 August 1995 (age 31)
- Place of birth: Brøndbyøster, Denmark
- Height: 1.86 m (6 ft 1 in)
- Position: Goalkeeper

Team information
- Current team: Nordsjælland
- Number: 13

Youth career
- Brøndby

Senior career*
Years	Team	Apps	(Gls)
2012–2016	Brøndby	0	(0)
2016–2019	HB Køge	99	(0)
2019–2022	AaB	5	(0)
2022	→ Nordsjælland (loan)	15	(0)
2022–	Nordsjælland	129	(0)

International career
2010	Denmark U16	1	(0)
2014	Denmark U19	2	(0)
2017	Denmark U21	1	(0)
- * Club domestic league appearances and goals as of 18 October 2026

Andreas Hansen (born 11 August 1995) is a Danish professional footballer who plays as a goalkeeper for Danish Superliga club Nordsjælland.

== Club career ==
He made his Danish Superliga debut for AaB on 20 June 2020 in a game against Nordsjælland.

On 27 January 2022, Hansen was sent on loan to league rivals Nordsjælland for the remainder of the 2021–22 season, with an option to buy. On 5 May 2022, Nordsjælland confirmed that they had triggered the option and signed Hansen on a permanently deal.

== Career statistics ==
As of match played 18 October 2026

Appearances and goals by club, season and competition
Club	Season	League			Danish Cup		Continental		Total	
Club	Season	Division	Apps	Goals	Apps	Goals	Apps	Goals	Apps	Goals
Brøndby	2012–13	Danish Superliga	0	0	0	0	—		0	0
Brøndby	2013–14	Danish Superliga	0	0	0	0	0	0	0	0
Brøndby	2014–15	Danish Superliga	0	0	0	0	0	0	0	0
Brøndby	2015–16	Danish Superliga	0	0	0	0	0	0	0	0
Brøndby	Total		0	0	0	0	0	0	0	0
HB Køge	2016–17	Danish 1st Division	33	0	1	0	—		34	0
HB Køge	2017–18	Danish 1st Division	33	0	1	0	—		34	0
HB Køge	2018–19	Danish 1st Division	33	0	0	0	—		33	0
HB Køge	Total		99	0	2	0	0	0	101	0
AaB	2019–20	Danish Superliga	3	0	4	0	—		7	0
AaB	2020–21	Danish Superliga	2	0	1	0	—		3	0
AaB	2021–22	Danish Superliga	0	0	3	0	—		3	0
AaB	Total		5	0	8	0	0	0	13	0
Nordsjælland (loan)	2021–22	Danish Superliga	15	0	0	0	—		15	0
Nordsjælland	2022–23	Danish Superliga	32	0	4	0	—		36	0
Nordsjælland	2023–24	Danish Superliga	29	0	3	0	9 (Note: Appearances in UEFA Conference League)	0	41	0
Nordsjælland	2024–25	Danish Superliga	30	0	1	0	—		31	0
Nordsjælland	2025–26	Danish Superliga	27	0	4	0	—		31	0
Nordsjælland	2026–27	Danish Superliga	11	0	0	0	7	0	18	0
Nordsjælland	Total		129	0	12	0	16	0	157	0
Career total			246	0	22	0	16	0	284	0
