= Patrick Olsen =

Danish footballer (born 1994)

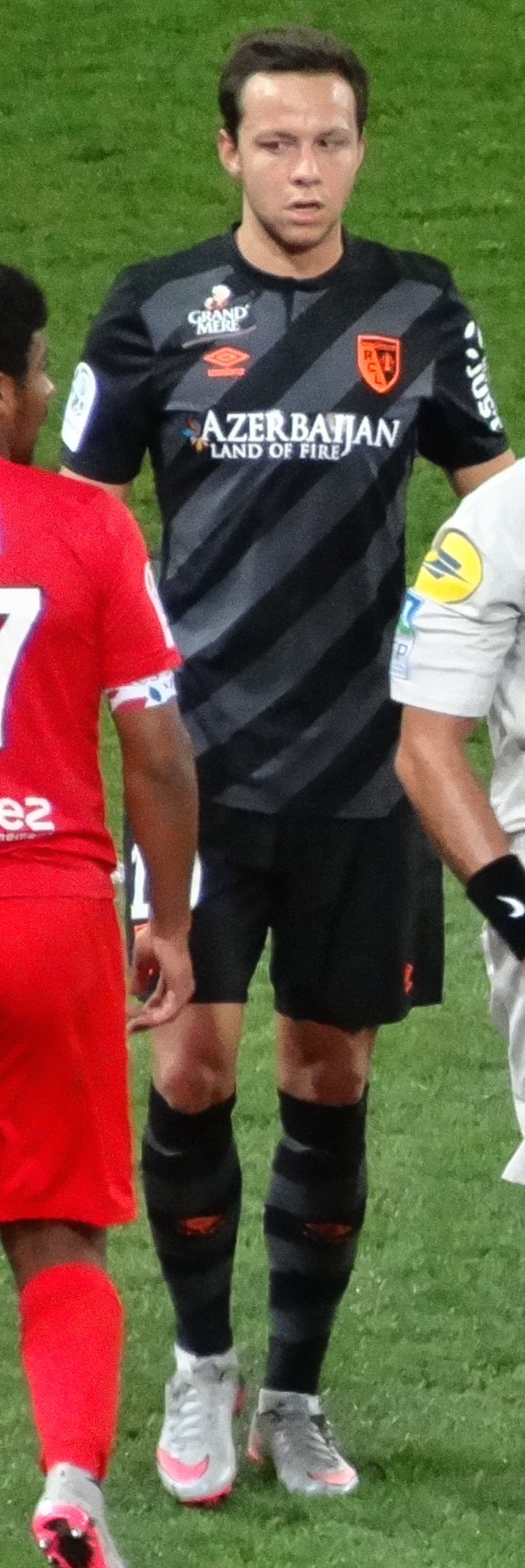
- Olsen with Lens in 2015

Personal information
- Full name: Patrick Haakon Olsen
- Date of birth: 23 April 1994 (age 32)
- Place of birth: Tårnby, Denmark
- Height: 1.78 m (5 ft 10 in)
- Position: Midfielder

Team information
- Current team: B.93
- Number: 33

Youth career
- 2002–2012: Brøndby
- 2012–2013: Inter Milan

Senior career*
Years	Team	Apps	(Gls)
2012	Brøndby	3	(0)
2013–2015	Inter Milan	0	(0)
2014	→ Strømsgodset (loan)	6	(0)
2015	Haugesund	11	(0)
2015–2017	Lens	25	(4)
2017	Grasshopper	6	(0)
2017–2019	Helsingør	52	(3)
2019–2020	AaB	35	(7)
2020–2022	AGF	43	(3)
2022–2024	Śląsk Wrocław	68	(3)
2024–2025	Dinamo București	28	(1)
2025–2026	Horsens	20	(1)
2026–	B.93	9	(1)

International career
2009–2010	Denmark U16	6	(1)
2010–2011	Denmark U17	23	(0)
2012	Denmark U18	2	(0)
2011–2013	Denmark U19	12	(1)
2012	Denmark U20	3	(0)
2013	Denmark U21	3	(0)
- * Club domestic league appearances and goals as of 3 October 2026

Patrick Haakon Olsen (born 23 April 1994) is a Danish professional footballer who plays as a midfielder for Danish 2nd Division club B.93.

A talent of the Brøndby academy, Olsen joined Italian Serie A club Inter Milan at age 18. After several spells with clubs in Norway, France and Switzerland, he returned to Denmark to play for Helsingør. After successive relegations, he moved to AaB before joining rivals AGF in 2020 after a breakout season. In early 2022, he signed for Polish top-flight side Śląsk Wrocław.

Olsen has gained 43 caps for several Danish national youth teams, including 23 appearances for the under-17 team.

== Club career ==
=== Brøndby ===
Born in Tårnby, Olsen joined the youth academy of Brøndby as an eight-year-old. He was promoted to the first-team squad in 2012, and made his professional debut in the Danish Superliga on 6 May 2012 against AaB. He made three appearances for the club.

=== Inter Milan ===
On 31 August 2012, Olsen signed with Serie A club Inter Milan on a three-year contract.

He played in Guinness Cup in 2013 with Inter and appeared in one Coppa Italia match, coming on as a substitute against Trapani. In February 2014, he was loaned out to Norwegian club Strømsgodset.

He spent 2014 on loan to Strømsgodset, but failed to break into the team, playing only 6 matches. He played instead mostly for the reserve team, where he received three red cards in total during the season. On 2 February 2015, Olsen was released from Inter.

=== Years abroad ===
On 24 April 2015, Olsen joined Norwegian side Haugesund. On 20 July 2015, after playing 11 of the 12 next league matches, Olsen left on a free transfer, despite that the club wanting to keep him.

On 27 August 2015, it was announced, that Olsen had signed a contract with Ligue 2 club RC Lens.

After a new coach arrived at Lens, Olsen played less during the 2016–17 season and in the winter break he moved to Swiss club Grasshoppers on 27 January 2017.

=== Return to Denmark ===
On 16 September 2017, Olsen moved to Danish club FC Helsingør, who had just won promotion to the Danish Superliga. He signed a three-year contract valid until the summer of 2020. Helsingør suffered relegation to the 1st Division during his first season at the club. After another disappointing season, Olsen even experienced relegation to the third-tier 2nd Division with the club.

On 26 June 2019, Olsen joined Superliga club AaB on a three-year contract. He evolved into a key player for the club, making 40 total appearances during the season in which he scored nine goals. AaB finished as runner-up in the Danish Cup and sixth in the league table.

On 19 August 2020, it was announced that Olsen had signed a five-year contract with fellow Danish Superliga club AGF. AGF paid DKK 6 million for him, and could end up – if all bonus clauses were triggered – end up paying close to DKK 9 million.

=== Śląsk Wrocław ===
On 15 February 2022, Olsen moved abroad yet again, as he was announced to have joined Polish Ekstraklasa side Śląsk Wrocław on a three-and-a-half-year deal. He served as the club's captain for the majority of the 2022–23 season and helped Śląsk finish the following league campaign as runners-up. On 4 September 2024, it was announced that Olsen had left the club by mutual consent.

=== Dinamo București ===
On the day of his departure from Śląsk, Olsen signed for Romanian Liga I outfit Dinamo București on a two-year contract.

=== AC Horsens ===
On 25 June 2025, Olsen returned to Denmark to sign a two-year contract with AC Horsens of the Danish 1st Division. He was one of the team's leading players for much of his first season. In April 2026, however, he was removed from the first-team squad and spent around three months training with the club's under-19 team, a period in which the players' union Spillerforeningen became involved; as a result, he did not feature as Horsens won promotion to the Danish Superliga. He returned to first-team training before the new season, and left the club having made 21 appearances, scoring once and providing five assists.

=== B.93 ===
On 12 July 2026, Olsen signed a three-year contract with B.93 of the Danish 2nd Division, recently relegated from the 1st Division. He made his competitive debut for the club on 31 July, the first matchday of the season, starting in a 3–1 away win over FA 2000.

== International career ==
He has played 43 official matches for the Danish national youth teams. In 2011, he was part of the Denmark national under-17 football team, which participated in the 2011 UEFA European U-17 Football Championship. He was later praised as one out of 11 talents to watch by UEFA. He also played in the 2011 FIFA U-17 World Cup.

In May 2013, Olsen was suspended for two days by his U19 national team coach Thomas Frank, as he had broken some internal rules. Unlike the other players, he had not been to the hotel on time.

== Career statistics ==
As of match played 7 August 2026

Appearances and goals by club, season and competition
Club	Season	League			Cup		Europe		Other		Total	
Club	Season	Division	Apps	Goals	Apps	Goals	Apps	Goals	Apps	Goals	Apps	Goals
Brøndby	2011–12	Danish Superliga	3	0	0	0	—		—		3	0
Inter Milan	2013–14	Serie A	0	0	1	0	—		—		1	0
Strømsgodset (loan)	2014	Tippeligaen	6	0	1	0	—		—		7	0
Haugesund	2015	Tippeligaen	11	0	1	0	—		—		12	0
Lens	2015–16	Ligue 2	25	4	0	0	—		—		25	4
Grasshopper	2016–17	Swiss Super League	6	0	0	0	—		—		6	0
Helsingør	2017–18	Danish Superliga	21	0	1	0	—		4 (Note: Appearances in the Superliga relegation play-offs)	0	26	0
Helsingør	2018–19	Danish 1st Division	31	3	1	0	—		—		32	3
Helsingør	Total		52	3	2	0	—		4	0	58	3
AaB	2019–20	Danish Superliga	35	7	5	2	—		—		40	9
AGF	2020–21	Danish Superliga	30	3	5	0	2 (Note: Appearances in the UEFA Europa League)	1	1 (Note: Appearances in the Superliga European play-offs)	0	38	4
AGF	2021–22	Danish Superliga	13	0	2	0	2 (Note: Appearances in the UEFA Europa Conference League)	1	0	0	17	1
AGF	Total		43	3	7	0	4	2	1	0	55	5
Śląsk Wrocław	2021–22	Ekstraklasa	12	0	—		—		—		12	0
Śląsk Wrocław	2022–23	Ekstraklasa	27	3	4	0	—		—		31	3
Śląsk Wrocław	2023–24	Ekstraklasa	29	0	1	0	—		—		30	0
Śląsk Wrocław	Total		68	3	5	0	—		—		73	3
Dinamo București	2024–25	Liga I	28	1	1	0	—		—		29	1
Horsens	2025–26	Danish 1st Division	20	1	1	0	—		—		21	1
B.93	2026–27	Danish 2nd Division	2	0	1	0	—		—		3	0
Career total			299	22	25	2	4	2	5	0	333	26

== Honours ==
AaB

- Danish Cup runner-up: 2019–20
