= Anders K. Jacobsen =

Danish footballer (born 1989)

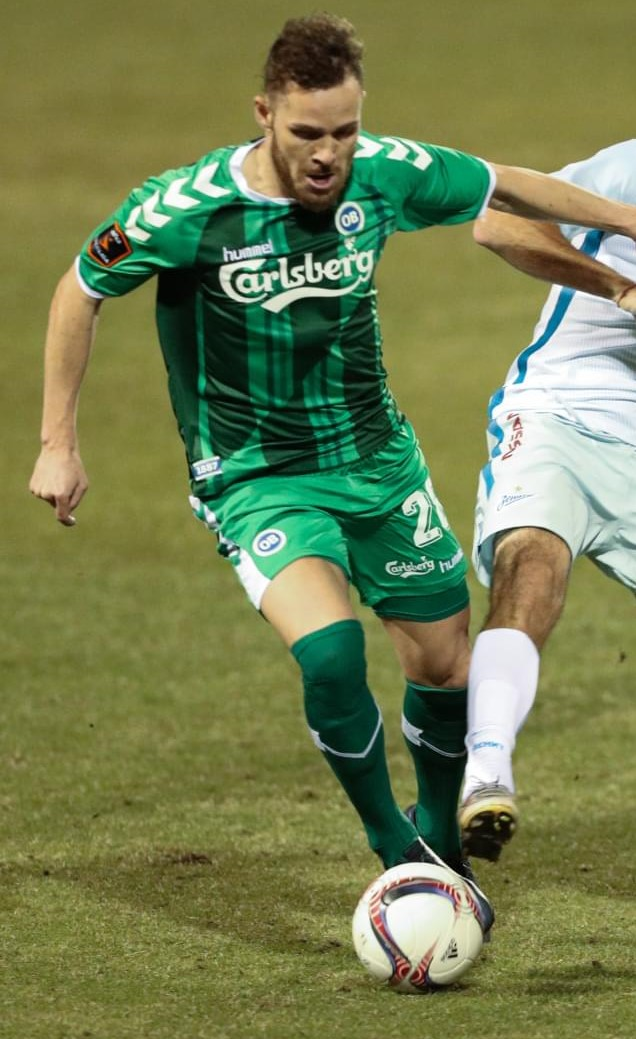
- Jacobsen in 2017

Personal information
- Full name: Anders Kvindebjerg Jacobsen
- Date of birth: 27 October 1989 (age 37)
- Place of birth: Odense, Denmark
- Height: 1.81 m (5 ft 11 in)
- Position: Forward

Team information
- Current team: Vejle
- Number: 18

Youth career
- Næsby
- 2006–2007: OB

Senior career*
Years	Team	Apps	(Gls)
2007–2010	OB	20	(0)
2008	→ Vejle (loan)	3	(0)
2010–2011	Næstved	7	(0)
2011–2012	Næsby	40	(32)
2012–2013	Fredericia	26	(14)
2013–2015	AaB	74	(21)
2015–2020	OB	131	(33)
2020–2021	SønderjyskE	48	(13)
2021–2024	Horsens	74	(26)
2024	→ Vejle (loan)	15	(0)
2024–	Vejle	33	(4)

International career
2005–2006	Denmark U17	6	(0)
2006–2007	Denmark U18	4	(1)
2007–2008	Denmark U20	2	(0)
- * Club domestic league appearances and goals as of 19 May 2026

Anders Kvindebjerg Jacobsen (born 27 October 1989) is a Danish professional footballer who plays as a striker for Danish Superliga club Vejle Boldklub.

He gained the nickname AK47 due to his initials and his good shooting abilities in front of goal.

Jacobsen came to the Odense Boldklub (OB) youth academy from Næsby Boldklub at an early age, but failed to break through to the first team. A return to Næsby in 2011 revived his career, and a subsequent move to Fredericia rekindled interest from the Danish Superliga. He signed with AaB in 2013, and returned to OB two years later as a proven goalscorer in the Danish top tier. In January 2020, Jacobsen moved to SønderjyskE where he won the Danish Cup in his first season, scoring two goals in the final against former team AaB.

He is a former youth international for Denmark, having gained 12 caps for several national youth teams.

== Club career ==
=== OB ===
Jacobsen moved to the Odense Boldklub (OB) youth academy from Næsby Boldklub in March 2006. In June 2007, he signed a three-year professional contract with OB, after having impressed for the reserve team competing in the fourth-tier Denmark Series, where he scored 13 goals in 15 games, and thus had a large share in the promotion of the second team to the Danish 2nd Division. On 22 July, Jacobsen made his first-team debut for the club, when he came on as a substitute for David Nielsen in the 2–0 victory over AGF.

On 1 September 2008, Jacobsen was sent on a one-season loan to Vejle Boldklub. However, the loan was not a success, and already in November, Jacobsen was dismissed in Vejle due to disciplinary issues. He had been going out ahead of a match against Midtjylland together with teammates Brian Nielsen, Danilo Arrieta and Slađan Perić against team rules. Jacobsen only made one appearance for Vejle; a match in the Danish Cup. Jacobsen later described his stint at Vejle as a "wake-up call".

=== Lower tiers ===
His contract with OB was not extended at its expiration in June 2010, and Næstved Boldklub signed him. Næstved picked him up on a free transfer next, and he signed a two-year contract with the club. He, however, already left Næstved after six months, when both parties agreed terminate his contract with immediate effect in December 2010 due to him "failing to live up to expectations".

After leaving Næstved, Jacobsen returned to his youth club Næsby. His tenure in the club was a success, with him scoring frequently for the third-tier club, and attracting interest from clubs at a higher level, which among other things led to a trial practice for Danish Superliga club Silkeborg.

However, it was second-tier Danish 1st Division club Fredericia who ended up signing Jacobsen on a two-year contract in May 2012.

=== AaB ===
On 30 July 2013, he moved from Fredericia to AaB, who triggered his release clause. He signed a two-and-a-half-year contract with the club from Aalborg. He scored his first goal for AaB against Midtjylland in his fourth league appearance for the club. He also scored in the two subsequent league matches against Brøndby and SønderjyskE, respectively.

=== Return to OB ===
In the summer of 2015, he returned to OB, with whom he had already signed a contract which would start from January 2016, but the parties involved agreed to make the transfer immediate, with the contract beginning as per 14 August 2015.

=== SønderjyskE ===
On 28 January 2020, Jacobsen terminated his contract with OB and joined SønderjyskE on a one-and-a-half-year deal. In the 2020 Danish Cup Final he scored both goals against his former club AaB as SønderjyskE won 2–0.

=== Horsens ===
On 31 August 2021, Jacobsen joined AC Horsens on a deal until June 2024.

After 2,5 years at Horsens, with 26 goals and 14 assists to his name, Jacobsen returned to his former club, Vejle Boldklub, in January 2024 on a loan deal for the rest of the season.

== International career ==
Jacobsen is a former youth international for Denmark, having gained 12 caps for several national youth teams, scoring one goal.

== Honours ==
=== Club ===
AaB

- Danish Superliga: 2013–14
- Danish Cup: 2013–14

SønderjyskE

- Danish Cup: 2019–20; runner-up: 2020–21
