= Magnus Christensen =

Danish footballer (born 1997)

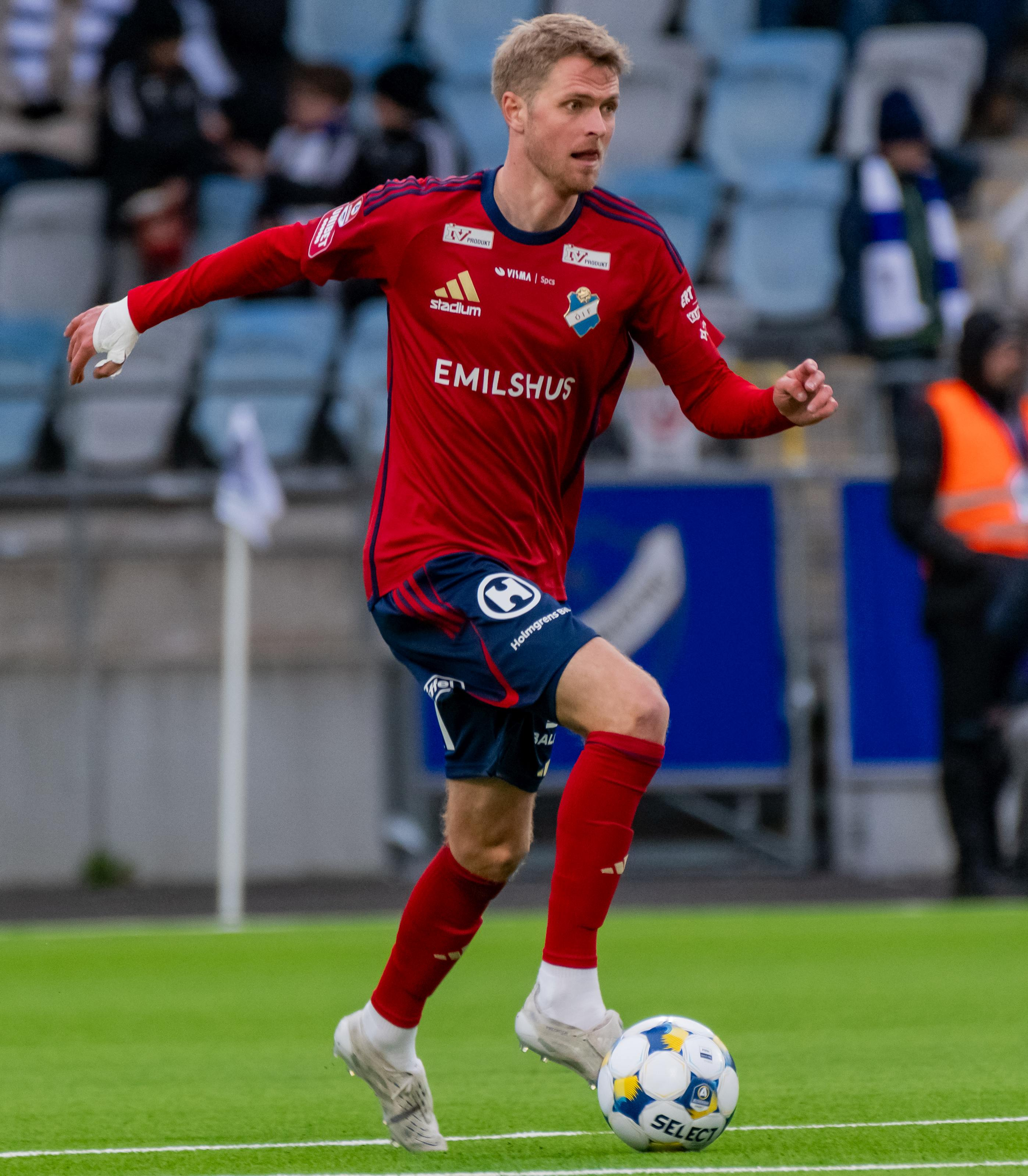

Personal information
- Date of birth: 20 August 1997 (age 29)
- Place of birth: Frederikshavn, Denmark
- Height: 1.90 m (6 ft 3 in)
- Position: Midfielder

Team information
- Current team: Östers IF
- Number: 26

Youth career
- Bangsbo Freja
- AaB

Senior career*
Years	Team	Apps	(Gls)
2016–2022	AaB	133	(3)
2022–2023	Haugesund	42	(1)
2024	Stabæk	28	(0)
2025–	Östers IF	32	(2)

International career
2015–2016	Denmark U-19	6	(0)
2016–2017	Denmark U-20	3	(0)
2017–2019	Denmark U-21	6	(1)
- * Club domestic league appearances and goals as of 12 November 2026

Magnus Christensen (born 20 August 1997) is a Danish professional footballer who plays as a midfielder for Superettan club Östers IF.

== Club career ==
=== AaB ===
Christensen was born in Frederikshavn, Denmark. At the age of 13 - as a U13 player - he moved to AaB from Bangsbo Freja.

On 10 June 2016, 18-year old Christensen was promoted to the first team squad, signing his first full-time professional contract with AaB. A month later, on 24 July 2016, Christensen got his official debut for the club. Christensen started on the bench, but replaced Casper Sloth in the 70th minute in a 1–0 victory against Randers FC in the Danish Superliga. On 23 November 2016 AaB announced, that they had extended the contract with Christensen until the summer 2020.

Christensen quickly became a regular part of the team, why he also signed a new three-year deal with AaB in June 2019. However, in the 2020–21 season, he lost his starting spot on the team, and later also in October 2020, broke his hand in a reserve team game. In November 2020, Christen told Danish newspaper Nordjyske Stiftstidende, that he wanted to leave AaB, after playing only one minute of professional football from the beginning of the season to the month of November. In January 2021, he was rumored to Randers, but in the end, decided to stay at AaB, after a new manager arrived at the end of January 2021. After a total of 149 games for AaB, it was confirmed, that Christensen had left the club, as his contract came to an end in June 2022.

=== Haugesund ===
On 11 July 2022 it was confirmed, that Christensen had joined Norwegian Eliteserien club Haugesund on a free transfer, signing a deal until June 2025. In early January 2024, Christensen didn't show up for Haugesund's winter kickoff. The club announced that it was because the player was looking for a new club. In early January 2024, it emerged that Christensen was keeping himself busy at his former club, AaB, while looking for another club, despite his contract at Haugesund not expiring until June 2025. It later emerged that Christensen and his girlfriend were not happy in Haugesund, which is why Christensen was looking for a new club.

=== Stabæk ===
On 30 January 2024 it was confirmed, that Christensen had signed a two-year deal with newly relegated Norwegian First Division club Stabæk.

=== Östers IF ===
On March 18, 2025, Christensen joined newly promoted Swedish Allsvenskan club Östers IF.
