= Jores Okore =

Danish footballer (born 1992)

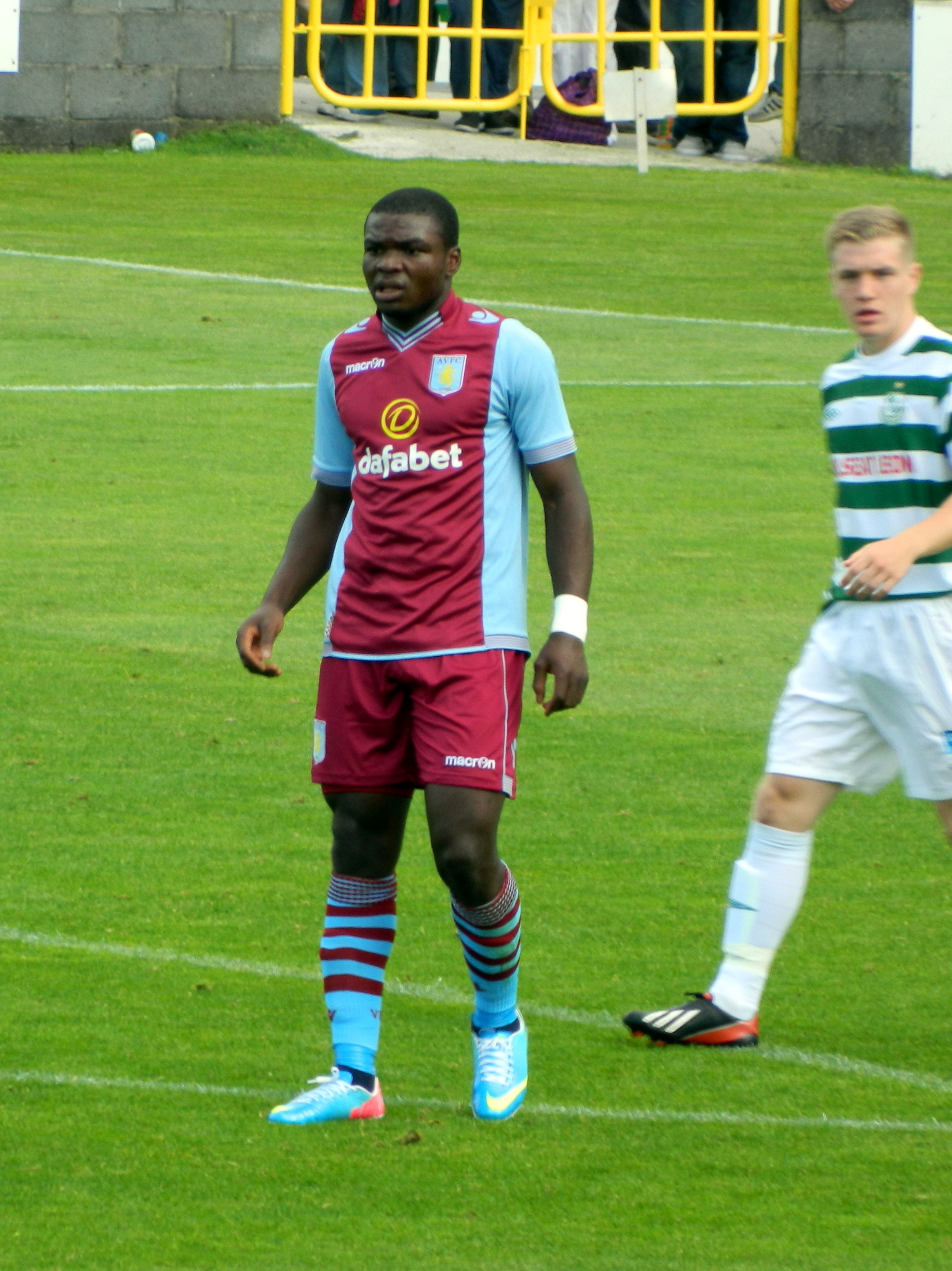
- Okore playing for Aston Villa

Personal information
- Full name: Tetchi Jores Charlemagne; Ulrich Okore
- Date of birth: 11 August 1992 (age 34)
- Place of birth: Abidjan, Ivory Coast
- Height: 1.83 m (6 ft 0 in)
- Position: Centre-back

Team information
- Current team: Ledøje-Smørum (assistant)

Youth career
- 2000–2007: B.93
- 2007–2011: Nordsjælland

Senior career*
Years	Team	Apps	(Gls)
2011–2013	Nordsjælland	65	(5)
2013–2016	Aston Villa	38	(1)
2016–2017	Copenhagen	5	(0)
2017–2020	AaB	104	(4)
2021–2023	Changchun Yatai	78	(3)
2024	B.93	5	(0)
Total		293	(12)

International career
2011–2014	Denmark U21	7	(0)
2016	Denmark U23	1	(0)
2011–2014	Denmark	11	(0)

Managerial career
- 2025–2026: Ledøje-Smørum (assistant)
- 2026–: Ledøje-Smørum
- * Club domestic league appearances and goals

Tetchi Jores Charlemagne Ulrich Okore (French pronunciation: [ʒɔ.ʁɛs ɔ.kɔ.ʁe]; Danish pronunciation: [ˈjoːɐs oˈkʰoːɐ]; born 11 August 1992), simply known as Jores Okore, is a retired professional footballer who played as a centre-back and current assistant coach of Denmark Series club Ledøje-Smørum.

Born in Ivory Coast, he has represented the Denmark national team.

Okore is considered a capable and aggressive defender, who is known for his pace and strength.

== Early life ==
Okore was born in Abidjan, Ivory Coast. He moved to Denmark with his family at the age of three and began to play football five years later with B.93 in the Østerbro district of Copenhagen. He moved to Nordsjælland in 2007, captaining the club's youth sides.

== Club career ==
=== Nordsjælland ===
Having previously made a handful of appearances in Danish Cup games, including being part of the Nordsjælland Cup-winning team in 2010–11, Okore made his league debut against Horsens on 3 April 2011, coming on as a substitute for Michael Parkhurst. Okore would continue to making first-team appearances in place of the injured Parkhurst for the remainder of the 2010–11 season, going on to make 11 league appearances and creating one assist. Okore signed a new four-year contract with the Farum-based club in June 2011, and was made an official member of the senior squad for the 2011–12 Superliga season by newly appointed head coach Kasper Hjulmand.

On 18 September 2011, Jores scored his first senior goal for Nordsjælland in a 2–0 league win over Brøndby. It was his only goal in that season. In November 2011, he signed a new contract, extending his stay with the club to December 2016. He was made vice-captain of Nordsjælland for the 2012–13 season.

=== Aston Villa ===
On 13 June 2013, Okore signed for English Premier League club Aston Villa on a four-year deal for a fee believed to be in the region of £4 million. Nordsjælland confirmed via the club's official Twitter and Facebook accounts that he was their most expensive sale ever. He made his Premier League debut on 21 August 2013 at Stamford Bridge against Chelsea, replacing the injured Ciaran Clark a few minutes before half-time. Okore made his first Premier League start on 24 August in Villa's home game against Liverpool. On 16 September 2013, Villa announced that Okore will be sidelined for the 2013–14 season after suffering a ruptured anterior cruciate ligament injury in his right knee in a game against Newcastle United on 14 September; the injury required season-ending surgery.

On 24 November 2014, Okore made his return to the Villa first team in a 1–1 draw against Southampton at Villa Park, 14 months after his injury. He scored his first goal for Villa in a 2–1 defeat to Chelsea at Villa Park, nodding in a cross from Carles Gil. On 9 April 2016, Okore refused to take a position as a substitute on the bench for Villa's game against AFC Bournemouth. Subsequently, he told caretaker manager, Eric Black that he did not want to be considered for any further games in the 2015–16 season. He was removed from the first-team squad and ordered to train with the under-21 side.

=== FC Copenhagen ===
On 27 August 2016, it was confirmed, that Okore had signed a four-year contract with Danish Superliga-club FC Copenhagen. He made his Superliga debut for the club on 18 November 2016, when he came on as a substitute in the 89th minute instead of Rasmus Falk in a 2–1 victory over AaB. In his sole season at the club, Okore made five Superliga appearance, in which he played full time in three of the matches.

=== AaB ===
On 6 July 2017, it was announced that Okore moved to AaB from Copenhagen for a reported fee of DKK 4.2 million. He signed a three-year contract keeping him at the club until 30 June 2020.

=== Changchun Yatai ===
Okore signed a three-year contract with recently promoted Chinese Super League club Changchun Yatai on 25 February 2021, after having made 116 official appearances for AaB. After the move, Okore stated: "As a club and as a city, AaB and Aalborg have more than matched my expectations, and I look back on a good time". He made his debut as a starter for Changchun Yatai on 22 April 2021, the opening game of the Super League in a 2–1 win over Dalian Pro. On 3 July 2022, he scored his first goal for Yatai in a 2–2 draw against Dalian Pro.

=== Return to B.93 ===
On September 7, 2024, after Okore had trained with his former youth club, B.93 for a while, the club confirmed that the partners had reached an agreement. It is not known how long an agreement.

Although Okore's contract expired at the end of 2024, he played in a training match in early January for the club, despite the fact that the parties had not yet agreed on a new deal. However, on February 4, 2025, B.93 confirmed that the club would not offer Okore a new contract.

== International career ==
On 6 September 2011, Okore made his international youth debut for the Denmark under-21 team at the age of 19, participating in a UEFA Under-21 Championship Qualifier, winning 3–0 over Northern Ireland.

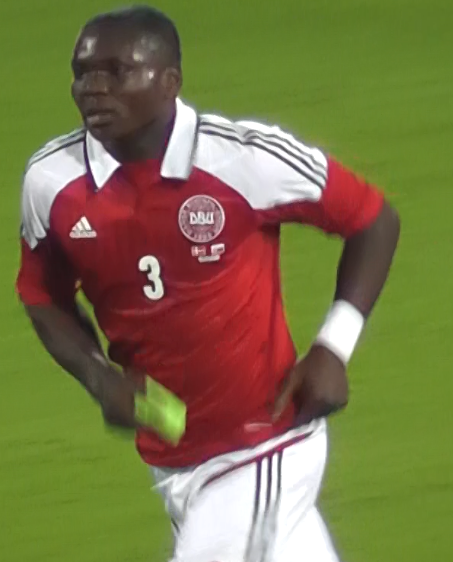
Okore playing for Denmark against Slovakia in 2012

Having made his debut two months earlier for the U21s, on 6 November 2011 Jores Okore was called up to the Danish senior team as a replacement for Simon Kjær, for a friendly against Sweden on 11 November 2011. He made his senior debut in that match, coming on at the 62nd minute, replacing his club teammate Andreas Bjelland. Okore was retained for the following international friendly against Finland, where he received his second cap and first start on 15 November 2011.

Okore was once again called up in December 2011 for Denmark's tour of Thailand in January. On 24 May 2012, it was announced that Okore had been selected for Denmark's squad for UEFA Euro 2012 as well as the preceding friendly matches against Brazil and Australia.

== Coaching career ==
On August 2, Okore confirmed that he had hung up his boots and would instead begin as an assistant coach at the Denmark Series club Ledøje-Smørum.

== Career statistics ==
=== Club ===
Appearances and goals by club, season and competition
Club	Season	League			Cup		League cup		Continental		Other		Total	
Club	Season	Division	Apps	Goals	Apps	Goals	Apps	Goals	Apps	Goals	Apps	Goals	Apps	Goals
Nordsjælland	2009–10	Danish Superliga	0	0	1	0	—		0	0	—		1	0
Nordsjælland	2010–11	Danish Superliga	11	0	3	0	—		0	0	—		14	0
Nordsjælland	2011–12	Danish Superliga	25	1	3	0	—		2	0	—		30	1
Nordsjælland	2012–13	Danish Superliga	29	4	0	0	—		5	0	—		34	4
Nordsjælland	Total		65	5	7	0	—		7	0	—		79	5
Aston Villa	2013–14	Premier League	3	0	0	0	1	0	—		—		4	0
Aston Villa	2014–15	Premier League	23	1	3	0	0	0	—		—		26	1
Aston Villa	2015–16	Premier League	12	0	2	0	0	0	—		—		14	0
Aston Villa	2016–17	Championship	0	0	—		1	0	—		—		1	0
Aston Villa	Total		36	1	5	0	2	0	—		—		43	1
Copenhagen	2016–17	Danish Superliga	5	0	2	0	—		1	0	—		8	0
AaB	2017–18	Danish Superliga	27	2	3	0	—		—		—		30	2
AaB	2018–19	Danish Superliga	29	0	2	0	—		—		2	0	33	0
AaB	2019–20	Danish Superliga	35	1	3	0	—		—		—		38	1
AaB	2020–21	Danish Superliga	13	1	2	1	—		—		—		15	2
AaB	Total		104	4	10	1	—		—		2	0	116	5
Changchun Yatai	2021	Chinese Super League	22	0	0	0	—		—		—		22	0
Changchun Yatai	2022	Chinese Super League	29	1	0	0	—		—		—		29	1
Changchun Yatai	2023	Chinese Super League	27	2	0	0	—		—		—		27	2
Changchun Yatai	Total		78	3	0	0	—		—		—		78	3
B.93	2024–25	Danish 1st Division	5	0	1	0	—		—		—		6	0
Career total			293	12	25	1	2	0	8	0	2	0	330	13

== Honours ==
Nordsjælland

- Danish Superliga: 2011–12
- Danish Cup: 2010–11

Aston Villa

- FA Cup runner-up:2014–15

Copenhagen

- Danish Superliga: 2016–17
- Danish Cup: 2016–17

AaB

- Danish Cup runner-up: 2019–20
