= Iver Fossum =

Norwegian footballer (born 1996)

Personal information
- Full name: Iver Tobias Rørvik Fossum
- Date of birth: 15 July 1996 (age 30)
- Place of birth: Klokkarstua, Norway
- Height: 1.80 m (5 ft 11 in)
- Position: Midfielder

Team information
- Current team: Rosenborg
- Number: 8

Youth career
- –2011: Huringen IF
- 2012–2013: Strømsgodset

Senior career*
Years	Team	Apps	(Gls)
2012–2014	Strømsgodset 2	37	(6)
2013–2015	Strømsgodset	60	(14)
2016–2019	Hannover 96	62	(2)
2019–2023	AaB	121	(23)
2023–2024	Midtjylland	4	(0)
2024–2025	KV Kortrijk	17	(0)
2025–	Rosenborg	38	(6)

International career
2011	Norway U15	4	(1)
2012	Norway U16	14	(5)
2013	Norway U17	13	(3)
2013	Norway U18	3	(0)
2014	Norway U19	2	(1)
2014–2019	Norway U21	28	(1)
2016–2019	Norway	14	(1)
- * Club domestic league appearances and goals as of 7 November 2026

Iver Tobias Rørvik Fossum (born 15 July 1996) is a Norwegian professional footballer who plays as a midfielder for Rosenborg.

== Club career ==
=== Strømsgodset ===
Born and raised in Klokkarstua, Fossum started his career at the local club Huringen IF. After Fossum lost his father in a car accident when he was 14 years old in 2011, the Fossum-family moved to Drammen, to have the opportunity to fulfill their – Iver and his brother Emil Fossum – dreams of becoming professional football players. Soon after, he joined Strømsgodset.

In the same period, Iver Fossum made his debut for Strømsgodset's second team in the Norwegian 2. divisjon. At that time he was still only 14 years old, but seen as one of the country's greatest talents. Rosenborg BK offered him a contract, but Fossum continued in Strømsgodset, where he was promoted to the first team at the age of 16.

Fossum made his debut for Strømsgodset in the 2–1 win against Molde on 28 April 2013. He got his breakthrough in the 2014 season, when he gradually worked his way into the first team, featuring in 26 of the 30 league matches. In the 2015 season, he became the top scorer for his club, which finished second in 2015 Tippeligaen.

=== Hannover 96 ===
Fossum signed a contract until June 2020 with Hannover 96 on 23 December 2015, in a deal worth 20 million NOK.

=== Denmark ===
On 16 August 2019, Fossum signed with the Danish Superliga club AaB.

On 27 April 2023, during AaB's battle to avoid relegation, it was confirmed by Fossum that he would not be renewing his contract with AaB upon its expiration, thus becoming a free agent effective from 1 July 2023.

On 10 July 2023, Fossum moved to fellow Danish Superliga club Midtjylland on a free transfer, signing a 3-year contract.

=== KV Kortrijk ===
During transfer deadline day on 1 February 2024, Fossum was sold to Belgian Pro League side KV Kortrijk, signing a contract until June 2026. On 30 January 2025, his contract with Kortrijk was terminated by mutual consent.

=== Rosenborg ===
On 3 February 2025, Fossum signed a three-year contract with Rosenborg.

== International career ==
Fossum was first called up to Norway national football team on 18 May 2016. He made his debut for Norway in the match against Portugal on 29 May 2016.

== Career statistics ==
=== Club ===
As of 7 November 2026

Appearances and goals by club, season and competition
Club	Season	League			Cup		Europe		Total	
Club	Season	Division	Apps	Goals	Apps	Goals	Apps	Goals	Apps	Goals
Strømsgodset	2013	Tippeligaen	4	0	1	1	0	0	5	1
Strømsgodset	2014	Tippeligaen	26	3	2	0	2	0	30	3
Strømsgodset	2015	Tippeligaen	30	11	2	1	6	0	38	12
Strømsgodset	Total		60	14	5	2	8	0	73	16
Hannover 96	2015–16	Bundesliga	9	0	0	0	–		9	0
Hannover 96	2016–17	2. Bundesliga	25	1	2	0	0	0	27	1
Hannover 96	2017–18	Bundesliga	19	1	0	0	0	0	19	1
Hannover 96	2018–19	Bundesliga	9	0	1	0	0	0	10	0
Hannover 96	Total		62	2	3	0	0	0	65	2
AaB	2019–20	Danish Superliga	29	3	4	3	–		34	6
AaB	2020–21	Danish Superliga	32	9	1	0	–		33	9
AaB	2021–22	Danish Superliga	30	8	3	3	–		33	11
AaB	2022–23	Danish Superliga	17	1	2	0	–		19	1
AaB	Total		108	21	10	6	0	0	118	27
Midtjylland	2023–24	Danish Superliga	4	0	2	2	4	0	10	2
KV Kortrijk	2023–24	Belgian Pro League	6	0	0	0	–		6	0
KV Kortrijk	2024–25	Belgian Pro League	11	0	2	0	–		13	0
KV Kortrijk	Total		17	0	2	0	0	0	19	0
Rosenborg	2025	Eliteserien	22	3	4	1	4	0	30	4
Rosenborg	2026	Eliteserien	16	3	2	0	–		18	3
Rosenborg	Total		38	6	6	1	4	0	48	7
Career total			289	43	28	11	16	0	333	55

=== International ===
As of match played on 18 November 2019

Appearances and goals by national team and year
National team	Year	Apps	Goals
Norway	2016	3	0
Norway	2017	–	
Norway	2018	9	0
Norway	2019	2	1
Total		14	1

Scores and results list Norway's goal tally first, score column indicates score after each Fossum goal.

List of international goals scored by Iver Fossum
No.	Date	Venue	Opponent	Score	Result	Competition
1	15 November 2019	Ullevaal Stadion, Oslo, Norway	Faroe Islands	1–0	4–0	UEFA Euro 2020 qualification

== Honours ==
Strømsgodset

- Tippeligaen: 2013

Individual

- Eliteserien Breakthrough of the Year: 2015
