= Kristoffer Pallesen =

Danish footballer (born 1990)

Personal information
- Date of birth: 30 April 1990 (age 36)
- Place of birth: Aarhus, Denmark
- Height: 1.75 m (5 ft 9 in)
- Position: Right-back

Youth career
- AGF

Senior career*
Years	Team	Apps	(Gls)
2010–2011	Skovbakken		
2011–2013	Hobro	43	(1)
2013–2017	Viborg	84	(0)
2017–2023	AaB	160	(2)
- * Club domestic league appearances and goals

Kristoffer Pallesen (born 30 April 1990) is a Danish retired professional footballer who played as a right back.

== Career ==
=== Early career ===
Pallesen played as a youth player for AGF, but never broke through to the first team. He therefore moved to another Aarhus club IK Skovbakken, where he played until Hobro IK signed him in February 2011, following his coach Jakob Michelsen. Initially, he received a six-month contract with Hobro, but the agreement was soon extended by another year, which meant that it ran until June 2013. Pallesen played primarily as a full-back in the defense. Half a year before his contract expired, in January 2013, Viborg FF announced that they had entered into a three-year agreement with Pallesen from 1 July 2013.

=== Viborg ===
After signing his three-year contract with Viborg FF in January 2013, Pallesen had his first practice with the team on 24 June and was assigned jersey number 15. He made his debut for Viborg in the Danish Cup match against Jammerbugt on 28 August 2013 which ended in a 0–1 away win. During his time at Viborg, Pallesen was part of the team which won the 2014–15 Danish 1st Division, achieving promotion to the Danish Superliga.

=== AaB ===
On 3 July 2017, Pallesen was officially presented as a new player in AaB, who needed a new full-back after the departure of Joakim Mæhle. The club signed him on a free transfer. According to Ekstra Bladet, Viborg initially rejected a bid of DKK 1.7 million from AaB, after which Viborg a few days later, according to TV3 Sport, accepted a bid of DKK 2.5 million. He made his official debut for AaB in the first round of the 2017–18 Danish Superliga season when he was in the starting lineup and played 90 minutes in the 1–1 away draw against Copenhagen. During his first season at the club, he was mostly a substitute as Patrick Kristensen held the position as starting right back. He finished his first season with 24 appearances.

In the 2018–19 season, Pallesen began as the starting right back, but again lost his spot to Kristensen during the second half of the season. He had 20 appearances that season.

In November 2019, he extended his contract with AaB until 2024. This followed a period, in which Pallesen had grown into a starter at right back. On 13 December 2019, he scored his first goal for the club in a 3–1 home loss to Nordsjælland. He ended the season with 37 appearances in which he scored two goals.

Pallesen started the 2021–22 season strong, recording 5 assists in his first 8 games of the season.

On 10 October 2023, AaB confirmed that 33-year-old Pallesen had been forced to end his football career after tearing his Achilles tendon in May 2023. At the same time, Pallesen was employed as a legal advisor in AaB's administration with primary connection to the sports department.

== Personal life ==
Pallesen studied law alongside his career as a professional footballer, obtaining his degree in 2020 from Aarhus University. His father is dean at the school's department of Business and Social Sciences.

== Honours ==
Viborg

- 1st Division: 2014–15

AaB

- Danish Cup runner-up: 2019–20
