= 2020–21 SønderjyskE Fodbold season =

SønderjyskE
2020–21 season
- Chairman: Gynther Kohls
- Head coach: Glen Riddersholm
- Stadium: Sydbank Park
- Danish Superliga: 8th
- Danish Cup: Runners-up
- UEFA Europa League: Third qualifying round
- Top goalscorer: League: Haji Wright (11 goals); All: Haji Wright (13 goals)
Home colours	Away colours

The 2020–21 season, was SønderjyskE's 20th season as a professional football club and their 12th consecutive season in the Superliga, the top-flight of Danish football. In addition to the domestic league, the club is competing in this season's editions of the Danish Cup and UEFA Europa League, which they appeared in for the second time following their win in the 2019–20 Danish Cup. The season covers the period from July 2020 to 30 June 2021.

== Players ==
As of 6 February 2021

Note: Flags indicate national team as defined under FIFA eligibility rules; some limited exceptions apply. Players may hold more than one non-FIFA nationality.

No.	Pos.	Nation	Player
1	GK	AUS	Lawrence Thomas
2	DF	DEN	Stefan Gartenmann
3	DF	SWE	Emil Holm
4	DF	ISL	Ísak Ólafsson
5	DF	DEN	Marc Dal Hende
6	DF	AUT	Philipp Schmiedl
7	MF	DEN	Julius Eskesen
10	FW	DEN	Anders K. Jacobsen
11	FW	NOR	Bård Finne
12	DF	DEN	Pierre Kanstrup
16	FW	DEN	Jannick Liburd
17	FW	DEN	Roni Arabaci
18	FW	BFA	Adama Guira

No.	Pos.	Nation	Player
19	DF	DEN	Mads Winther
20	FW	DEN	Peter Christiansen
21	FW	DEN	Jeppe Simonsen
22	DF	DEN	Emil Frederiksen
23	MF	DEN	Mads Hansen
24	MF	DEN	Rasmus Vinderslev
25	FW	USA	Haji Wright
26	DF	DEN	Patrick Banggaard
28	GK	DEN	Nicolai Flø
29	MF	CMR	Victor Ekani
77	MF	NGR	Rilwan Hassan
90	MF	DEN	Mads Albæk

=== Youth players in use ===
Note: Flags indicate national team as defined under FIFA eligibility rules; some limited exceptions apply. Players may hold more than one non-FIFA nationality.

No.	Pos.	Nation	Player
30	MF	DEN	Isak Jensen

== Transfers ==
=== In ===
No.	Pos	Player	Transferred from	Fee	Date	Source
25	FW	(United States) Haji Wright	(Netherlands) VVV-Venlo	Free	2 August 2020	
22	DF	(Denmark) Emil Frederiksen	(Netherlands) SC Heerenveen	Undisclosed	2 August 2020	
1	GK	(Australia) Lawrence Thomas	(Australia) Melbourne Victory	Free	2 August 2020	
5	DF	(Denmark) Marc Dal Hende	(Denmark) Midtjylland	Undisclosed	9 August 2020	
28	GK	(Denmark) Nicolai Flø	(Denmark) Vendsyssel	Free	13 August 2020	
6	DF	(Austria) Philipp Schmiedl	(Austria) SCR Altach	Undisclosed	3 October 2020	
11	FW	(Norway) Bård Finne	(Norway) Vålerenga	Undisclosed	10 October 2020	
3	DF	(Sweden) Emil Holm	(Sweden) Göteborg	Undisclosed	26 January 2021	
18	MF	(Burkina Faso) Adama Guira	(Hong Kong) R&F	Undisclosed	6 February 2021	

=== Out ===
No.	Pos	Player	Transferred to	Fee	Date	Source
28	GK	(Germany) Sebastian Mielitz	(Germany) Viktoria Köln	Free	15 July 2020	
14	DF	(Portugal) João Pereira	Unattached	Released	1 August 2020	
8	FW	(Denmark) Christian Jakobsen	(Denmark) Lyngby	Undisclosed	3 August 2020	
6	MF	(Iceland) Eggert Jónsson	(Iceland) FH	Free	4 August 2020	
1	GK	(Serbia) Nikola Mirković	Unattached	Released	5 October 2020	
3	DF	(Denmark) Marc Pedersen		Retired	23 October 2020	
15	FW	(Denmark) Johan Absalonsen		End of contract	31 December 2020	
14	DF	(Denmark) Mads Steenberg	(Denmark) Middelfart	Undisclosed	2 January 2021	
9	MF	(Denmark) Alexander Bah	(Czech Republic) Slavia Prague	Undisclosed	5 January 2021	
8	MF	(Nigeria) Ogenyi Onazi	Unattached	Released	5 January 2021	

== Non-competitive friendlies ==
Win Draw Loss Fixtures

== Competitions ==
=== Overview ===
Competition	First match	Last match	Starting round	Record							
Competition	First match	Last match	Starting round	Pld	W	D	L	GF	GA	GD	Win %
Superliga	11 September 2020	May 2021	Matchday 1	22	8	4	10	30	32	−2	36.36
Danish Cup	11 November 2020		Third round	4	4	0	0	9	2	+7	100.00
Europa League	24 September 2020		Third qualifying round	1	0	0	1	0	3	−3	0.00
Total				27	12	4	11	39	37	+2	44.44

Last updated: 21 March 2021
Source: Weltfussball

=== Danish Superliga ===
==== Results by matchday ====
Matchday	1	2	3	4	5	6	7	8	9	10	11	12	13	14	15	16	17	18	19	20	21	22
Ground	H	A	H	A	H	A	H	A	A	H	H	A	H	A	H	A	A	H	H	A	H	A
Result	W	L	W	D	W	W	D	W	D	L	W	L	L	W	L	L	L	L	D	L	W	L
Position	3	7	3	4	4	2	1	1	2	3	2	4	5	5	6	6	6	7	7	7	6	7

Updated to match(es) played on 21 March 2021. Source: Weltfussball
A = Away; H = Home; W = Win; D = Draw; L = Loss

==== Regular season ====
Pos	Team	Pld	W	D	L	GF	GA	GD	Pts	Qualification
5	Randers	22	9	5	8	31	21	+10	32	Qualification for the Championship round
6	Nordsjælland	22	7	8	7	35	30	+5	29	Qualification for the Championship round
7	SønderjyskE	22	8	4	10	30	32	−2	28	Qualification for the Relegation round
8	OB	22	7	7	8	25	28	−3	28	Qualification for the Relegation round
9	AaB	22	7	7	8	24	30	−6	28	Qualification for the Relegation round

Source: Danish Football Association (in Danish), Soccerway
Rules for classification: 1) Points; 2) Goal difference; 3) Goals scored; 4) Away goals scored; 5) Play-off (played on neutral ground if determining teams for different rounds); 6) Draw.

==== Relegation round ====
Pos	Team	Pld	W	D	L	GF	GA	GD	Pts	Qualification or relegation	AAB	SON	ODE	VEJ	LYN	HOR
1	AaB	32	12	10	10	44	41	+3	46	Qualification for the European play-off match	—	3–2	3–2	2–1	4–0	1–1
2	SønderjyskE	32	13	5	14	45	48	−3	44		0–4	—	2–0	1–0	2–0	2–3
3	OB	32	11	10	11	40	39	+1	43		1–0	1–1	—	0–1	2–0	4–0
4	Vejle	32	9	11	12	42	50	−8	38		1–1	4–2	2–2	—	2–2	3–0
5	Lyngby (R)	32	6	8	18	36	63	−27	26	Relegation to Danish 1st Division	2–2	0–1	1–2	0–0	—	3–4

Source: Danish Football Association (in Danish), Soccerway
Legend: Blue = home team win; Yellow = draw; Red = away team win.
Rules for classification: 1) Points; 2) Goal difference; 3) Goals scored; 4) Away goals scored; 5) Play-off (played on neutral ground if determining teams for different rounds); 6) Draw.
(R) Relegated

==== Matches ====
11 September 2020 1	SonderjyskE	2–0	Midtjylland	Haderslev
19:00 CEST	Bah 57'; Wright 90'	FCM Summary	Cools (yellow card) 48'	Stadium: Sydbank Park; Attendance: 2,210; Referee: Mads-Kristoffer Kristoffersen

20 September 2020 2	Vejle	4–1	SonderjyskE	Vejle
18:00 CEST	Allan Sousa 45+2' (pen.), 62' (pen.); Mucolli 84', 90+7'; Ezatolahi (yellow card) 87'	Report	Jacobsen 52' (yellow card) 53'; Wright (yellow card) 90+3'	Stadium: Vejle Stadium; Referee: Aydin Uslu

27 September 2020 3	SonderjyskE	3–1	AaB	Haderslev
14:00 CEST	Absalonsen 41' (pen.); Banggaard (yellow card) 43'; Christiansen (yellow card) 45+1'; Ekani (yellow card) 45+2'; Absalonsen (yellow card) 45+4'; Wright 88', 90+7'	Report	van Weert 63' (pen.)	Stadium: Sydbank Park; Referee: Benjamin Willaume-Jantzen

4 October 2020 4	Lyngby	2–2	SonderjyskE	Lyngby
14:00 CEST	Jakobsen 42'; Geertsen 90'; Riel (red card) 90+4'	Report	Jacobsen 25', 71'	Stadium: Lyngby Stadium; Referee: Jakob Kehlet

18 October 2021 5	SønderjyskE	2–0	Brøndby	Haderslev
16:00 CEST	Wright 48'; Bah 54'	Report		Stadium: Sydbank Park; Referee: Sandi Putros

25 October 2020 6	Randers	1–2	SonderjyskE	Randers
16:00 CEST	Greve 8'; Kopplin (yellow card) 45+3'	Report	Jacobsen 6'; Ekani (yellow card) 25' (yellow-red card) 27'; Wright (yellow card) 39' (goal) 42'; Simonsen (yellow card) 83'; Bah (yellow card) 85'	Stadium: Randers Stadium; Attendance: 300; Referee: Michael Tykgaard

2 November 2020 7	SønderjyskE	1–1	AGF	Haderslev
19:00 CET	Wright (yellow card) 10'; Jacobsen 37' (pen.) (yellow card) 45'; Albæk (yellow card) 61'	Report	Blume 32' (yellow card) 58'; Olsen (yellow card) 63'; Helenius (yellow card) 90+3'	Stadium: Haderslev Football Stadium; Attendance: 300; Referee: Jørgen Burchardt

8 November 2020 8	Horsens	0–3	SønderjyskE	Horsens
20:00 CET	Jacobsen (yellow card) 9'; Frantsen (yellow card) 11'; Thorsen (yellow card) 80'; Qamili (yellow card) 87'; Brajanac (yellow card) 90+1'	Report	Ekani 22'; Bah (yellow card) 52' (goal) 68'; Thomas (yellow card) 56'; Wright 78'	Stadium: CASA Arena Horsens; Referee: Peter Kjærsgaard-Andersen

22 November 2020 9	OB	1–1	SønderjyskE	Odense
14:00 CEST	Skjelvik (yellow card) 49'; Thomasen 83'; Gudjohnsen (yellow card) 87'	Report	Bah (yellow card) 86'; Tverskov 90+2' (o.g.)	Stadium: Nature Energy Park; Attendance: 300; Referee: Jakob Kehlet

29 November 2020 10	SønderjyskE	1–3	Copenhagen	Haderslev
16:00 CEST	Daramy 3'; Zeca 34'; Oviedo (yellow card) 76'; Falk 81'	Report	Bah 73'	Stadium: Sydbank Park; Attendance: 300; Referee: Morten Krogh

6 December 2020 11	SønderjyskE	2–1	Nordsjælland	Haderslev
14:00 CET	Bah (yellow card) 18'; Simonsen 44'; Wright 47'; Albæk (yellow card) 90+1'	Report	Abu 52' (yellow card) 90+1'	Stadium: Sydbank Park; Attendance: 300; Referee: Benjamin Willaume-Jantzen

13 December 2021 12	Brøndby	2–1	SønderjyskE	Brøndbyvester
18:00 CET	Uhre 32' (yellow card) 41'; Vigen (yellow card) 55'; Slimane 83'	Report	Jacobsen 42' (pen.) (yellow card) 53'; Hassan (yellow card) 81'; Simonsen (yellow card) 86'	Stadium: Brøndby Stadium; Referee: Peter Kjaersgaard-Andersen

20 December 2020 13	SønderjyskE	0–1	Randers	Haderslev
14:00 CET	Wright (yellow card) 34' (yellow-red card) 45'; Ekani (yellow card) 85'	Report	Kamara (yellow card) 22'; Rømer (yellow card) 32'; Sambou (yellow card) 47' (goal) 71'; Greve (yellow card) 70'	Stadium: Sydbank Park; Attendance: 300; Referee: Jørgen Burchardt

4 February 2021 14	FC Midtjylland	1–2	SønderjyskE	Herning
18:00 CEST	Cajuste (yellow card) 33'; Sviatchenko 90+'	FCM Summary	Frederiksen (yellow card) 23'; Albæk 45'; Gartenmann (yellow card) 47'; Eskesen (yellow card) 76'; Jacobsen 80' (Gartenmann); Kanstrup (yellow card) 88'; Dal Hende (yellow card) 89'	Stadium: MCH Arena; Referee: Peter Kjærsgaard-Andersen

7 February 2021 15	SønderjyskE	0–1	Vejle	Haderslev
18:00 CET		Report	Hetemi (yellow card) 21'; Allan Sousa (yellow card) 27'; Faghir 48' (yellow card) 63'	Stadium: Sydbank Park; Referee: Aydin Uslu

15 February 2021 16	Copenhagen	3–2	SønderjyskE	Copenhagen
19:00 CET	Fischer 38'; Wind 48' (pen.), 81' (pen.); Stage (yellow card) 57'; Jørgensen (yellow card) 82'; Boilsen (yellow card) 87'; Bartolec (yellow card) 90+5'	FCK Summary	Ekani (yellow card) 35' (yellow-red card) 47'; Albæk (yellow card) 40' (goal) 45+1'; Banggaard (yellow card) 80'; Dal Hende 83' (pen.)	Stadium: Telia Parken; Attendance: 0 Referee: Sandi Putros

21 February 2021 17	AGF	2–0	SønderjyskE	Aarhus
16:00 CET	Mortensen 74' (pen.); Olsen 80'	Report	Gartenmann (red card) 74'	Stadium: Ceres Park; Referee: Mads Kristoffersen

1 March 2021 18	SønderjyskE	1–4	Lyngby	Haderslev
19:00 CET	Jacobsen 82' (pen.)		Warming 37'; Gammelby 44', 52'; Kaastrup 84'	Stadium: Sydbank Park; Attendance: 0

4 March 2021 19	SønderjyskE	1–1	OB	Haderslev
18:00 CET	Vinderslev (yellow card) 30'; Dal Hende 53'; Thomas (yellow card) 89'; Eskesen (yellow card) 90+5'	Report	Jebali 78'	Stadium: Sydbank Park; Attendance: 0 Referee: Mikkel Redder

8 March 2021 20	AaB	1–0	SønderjyskE	Aalborg
19:00 CET	Nielsen (yellow card) 15'; Thelander (yellow card) 33'; Fossum 90+3' (pen.); Børsting (yellow card) 90+6'	Report	Vinderslev (yellow card) 32'; Jacobsen (yellow card) 75'; Simonsen (yellow card) 90+2'	Stadium: Aalborg Portland Park; Attendance: 0 Referee: Aydin Uslu; Fourth official: Michael Rasmussen

14 March 2021 21	SonderjyskE	2–0	Horsens	Haderslev
14:00 CET	Jacobsen 4'; Dal Hende 9'	FCM Summary		Stadium: Sydbank Park; Attendance: 0 Referee: Sandi Putros

21 March 2021 22	Nordsjælland	2–1	SønderjyskE	Farum
17:00 CET	Schjelderup 16', 34'	Report	Thychosen 57' (o.g.)	Stadium: Right to Dream Park; Attendance: 0 Referee: Michael Tykgaard

=== Danish Cup ===
11 November 2020 Third round	Skive IK	0–1	SønderjyskE	Skive
		Report	Christiansen 2'	Stadium: Skive Stadium

16 December 2020 Fourth round	SønderjyskE	2–1 (a.e.t.)	Lyngby	Haderslev
	Wright 40'; Gartenmann 114'	Report	Torp 33'	Stadium: Haderslev Football Stadium

10 February 2021 Quarter-finals 1st leg	Fremad Amager	1–2	SønderjyskE	Copenhagen
18:00 CET	Soulas 65'	Report	Finne 37'; Ekani 83'	Stadium: Sundby Idrætspark; Referee: Jens Maae

11 March 2021 Quarter-finals 2nd leg	SønderjyskE	4–1 (6–2 agg.)	Fremad Amager	Haderslev
16:30 CET	Wright 13'; Holm 38', 56'; Frederiksen 89'	Report	Bay 48' (pen.)	Stadium: Haderslev Football Stadium; Referee: Peter Kjærsgaard

8 April 2021 Semi-finals 1st leg	Midtjylland	1–0	SønderjyskE	Herning
16:30 CEST	Kaba 48'	Report	Vinderslev (yellow card) 34'; Holm (yellow card) 69'	Stadium: MCH Arena; Attendance: 0 Referee: Jens Maae

15 April 2021 Semi-finals 2nd leg	SønderjyskE	3–1 (3–2 agg.)	Midtjylland	Haderslev
16:30 CEST	Simonsen 49', 83'; Scholz 55' (o.g.); Banggaard (yellow card) 75'; Eskesen (yellow card) 88'	Report	Scholz (yellow card) 4'; Evander 87'	Stadium: Sydbank Park; Attendance: 0 Referee: Jakob Kehlet

13 May 2021 Final	Randers	4–0	SønderjyskE	Aarhus
16:30 CEST	Marxen 2'; Greve 7', 81'; Piesinger 52'; Kallesøe (yellow card) 71'	Report	Eskesen (yellow card) 19'; Albæk (yellow card) 83'; Dal Hende (yellow card) 86'	Stadium: Ceres Park; Attendance: 7,981; Referee: Morten Krogh

=== UEFA Europa League ===
24 September 2020 Third qualifying round	Viktoria Plzeň (Czech Republic)	3–0	(Denmark) SønderjyskE	Doosan Arena, Plzeň
18:00	Ondrášek 35' (pen.); Ba Loua 41'; Káčer 51'	Report		Attendance: 0 Referee: Donatas Rumšas (Lithuania)

== Statistics ==
=== Goalscorers ===
Rank	No.	Pos	Nat	Name	Superliga	Danish Cup	Europa League	Total
1	25	FW	(United States)	Haji Wright	11	2	0	13
2	10	FW	(Denmark)	Anders K. Jacobsen	10	0	0	10
3	3	DF	(Sweden)	Emil Holm	3	2	0	5
4	5	MF	(Denmark)	Alexander Bah	4	0	0	4
4	5	DF	(Denmark)	Marc Dal Hende	4	0	0	4
4	21	FW	(Denmark)	Jeppe Simonsen	2	2	0	4
7	2	DF	(Denmark)	Stefan Gartenmann	1	1	0	2
7	22	MF	(Denmark)	Emil Frederiksen	1	1	0	2
7	29	MF	(Cameroon)	Victor Ekani	1	1	0	2
7	77	MF	(Nigeria)	Rilwan Olanrewaju Hassan	2	0	0	2
7	90	MF	(Denmark)	Mads Albæk	2	0	0	2
12	11	FW	(Norway)	Bård Finne	0	1	0	1
12	20	FW	(Denmark)	Peter Christiansen	0	1	0	1
12	26	DF	(Denmark)	Patrick Banggaard	1	0	0	1
12		FW	(Denmark)	Johan Absalonsen	1	0	0	1
Own goals					2	1	0	3
Totals					45	12	0	57

Last updated: 24 May 2021

=== Clean sheets ===
Rank	No.	Pos	Nat	Name	Superliga	Danish Cup	Europa League	Total
1	1	GK	(Australia)	Lawrence Thomas	8	0	0	8
2	28	GK	(Denmark)	Nicolai Flø	0	1	0	1
Totals					8	1	0	9

Last updated: 24 May 2021
