= 2019–20 SønderjyskE Fodbold season =

SønderjyskE
2020–21 season
- Chairman: Gynther Kohls
- Head coach: Glen Riddersholm
- Stadium: Sydbank Park
- Danish Superliga: 10th
- Danish Cup: Winners
- Top goalscorer: League: Christian Jakobsen (8); All: Christian Jakobsen (9)
- Highest home attendance: 7,417
- Lowest home attendance: 0
- Average home league attendance: 3,478
Home colours	Away colours

The 2019–20 season, was SønderjyskE's 19th season as a professional football club and their 11th consecutive season in the Superliga, the top-flight of Danish football. In addition to the domestic league, the club competed in the Danish Cup.

In the Danish Cup, SønderjyskE reached the final for the first time in club history, defeating AaB by a score of 2–0 to secure the club's first major honour and a spot in the third qualifying round of the 2020–21 UEFA Europa League.

== Players ==
As of 31 January 2020

Note: Flags indicate national team as defined under FIFA eligibility rules; some limited exceptions apply. Players may hold more than one non-FIFA nationality.

No.	Pos.	Nation	Player
1	GK	SRB	Nikola Mirković
2	DF	DEN	Stefan Gartenmann
3	DF	DEN	Marc Pedersen
4	DF	ISL	Ísak Ólafsson
5	DF	GRE	Fanis Mavrommatis (on loan from Panathinaikos)
6	MF	ISL	Eggert Jónsson
7	MF	DEN	Julius Eskesen
8	FW	DEN	Christian Jakobsen
9	MF	DEN	Alexander Bah
10	FW	DEN	Anders K. Jacobsen
12	DF	DEN	Pierre Kanstrup
14	DF	POR	João Pereira
15	FW	DEN	Johan Absalonsen

No.	Pos.	Nation	Player
18	DF	DEN	Nicholas Marfelt
20	FW	DEN	Peter Christiansen
21	FW	DEN	Jeppe Simonsen
22	MF	DEN	Emil Frederiksen (on loan from Heerenveen)
23	MF	DEN	Mads Hansen
24	MF	DEN	Rasmus Vinderslev
26	DF	DEN	Patrick Banggaard
28	GK	GER	Sebastian Mielitz
29	MF	CMR	Victor Ekani
35	GK	CAN	Oliver Saundry
47	FW	UKR	Artem Dovbyk (on loan from FC Midtjylland)
77	MF	NGA	Rilwan Hassan
90	MF	DEN	Mads Albæk

== Transfers ==
=== In ===
No.	Pos	Player	Transferred to	Fee	Date	Source
77	MF	(Nigeria) Rilwan Hassan	(Denmark) Midtjylland	Free	30 June 2019	
90	MF	(Denmark) Mads Albæk	(Germany) 1. FC Kaiserslautern	Free	30 June 2019	
47	FW	(Ukraine) Artem Dovbyk	(Denmark) Midtjylland	Loan	2 September 2019	
7	MF	(Denmark) Julius Eskesen	(Denmark) OB	Undisclosed	28 January 2020	
10	FW	(Denmark) Anders K. Jacobsen	(Denmark) OB	Free	28 January 2020	
5	DF	(Greece) Theofanis Mavrommatis	(Greece) Panathinaikos	Loan	30 January 2020	

=== Out ===
No.	Pos	Player	Transferred to	Fee	Date	Source
17	MF	(New Zealand) Marco Rojas	(Australia) Melbourne Victory	Free	16 December 2019	
10	MF	(Netherlands) Mart Lieder	(Denmark) OB	Free	28 January 2020	

== Competitions ==
=== Overview ===
Competition	First match	Last match	Starting round	Final position	Record							
Competition	First match	Last match	Starting round	Final position	Pld	W	D	L	GF	GA	GD	Win %
Superliga	14 September 2019	8 July 2020	Matchday 1	10th	32	9	11	12	37	49	−12	28.13
Danish Cup	2019	Final	Third round	Winners	5	5	0	0	11	4	+7	100.00
Total					37	14	11	12	48	53	−5	37.84

Last updated: 1 July 2021
Source: FBref

=== Danish Superliga ===
==== Results by matchday ====
Matchday	1	2	3	4	5	6	7	8	9	10	11	12	13	14	15	16	17	18	19	20	21	22	23	24	25	26
Ground	H	A	A	H	H	A	H	A	H	A	H	A	H	H	A	A	H	A	H	A	H	A	A	H	A	H
Result	W	D	W	L	D	D	L	D	D	D	W	W	L	L	L	L	D	L	W	L	W	L	L	D	L	D
Position	5	4	4	4	5	5	7	8	9	9	8	7	9	10	10	10	10	11	10	11	10	10	10	11	11	11

Updated to match(es) played on 8 July 2021. Source: Weltfussball
A = Away; H = Home; W = Win; D = Draw; L = Loss

==== Regular season ====
Pos	Team	Pld	W	D	L	GF	GA	GD	Pts	Qualification
9	OB	26	9	6	11	34	30	+4	33	Qualification for the Relegation round
10	Lyngby	26	9	5	12	31	45	−14	32	Qualification for the Relegation round
11	SønderjyskE	26	6	9	11	31	44	−13	27	Qualification for the Relegation round
12	Hobro	26	3	14	9	25	35	−10	23	Qualification for the Relegation round
13	Esbjerg	26	4	6	16	22	44	−22	18	Qualification for the Relegation round

Source: Danish Football Association (in Danish), Soccerway
Rules for classification: 1) Points; 2) Goal difference; 3) Goals scored; 4) Away goals scored; 5) Play-off (played on neutral ground if determining teams for different rounds); 6) Draw.

==== Relegation round ====
Pos	Team	Pld	W	D	L	GF	GA	GD	Pts	Qualification or relegation	ODE	SON	LYN	SIL
1	OB	32	12	7	13	43	42	+1	43	Qualification for the European play-offs	—	2–0	3–1	1–3
2	SønderjyskE	32	9	11	12	37	49	−12	38	Qualification for the Europa League third qualifying round (Note: SønderjyskE qualified for the Europa League third qualifying round by winning the 2019–20 Danish Cup.)	1–1	—	1–0	1–0
3	Lyngby (O)	32	9	7	16	34	54	−20	34	Qualification for the relegation play-offs	1–2	1–1	—	0–0
4	Silkeborg (R)	32	6	8	18	43	59	−16	26	Relegation to 2020–21 Danish 1st Division	6–0	1–2	2–0	—

Source: Soccerway
Legend: Blue = home team win; Yellow = draw; Red = away team win.
Rules for classification: 1) Points; 2) Goal difference; 3) Goals scored; 4) Away goals scored; 5) Play-off.
(O) Play-off winners; (R) Relegated

=== Danish Cup ===
25 September 2019 Third round	Hvidovre IF	2–4 (a.e.t.)	SønderjyskE	Hvidovre
18:30 CEST	Buch 81'; Nygaard 86'	Report	Jakobsen 23'; Rojas 33'; Absalonsen 102'; Lieder 117'	Stadium: Hvidovre Stadium

30 October 2019 Fourth round	Brøndby	0–1	SønderjyskE	Brøndbyvester
18:00 (20:00 postponed) CET			Lieder 84'	Stadium: Brøndby Stadium; Attendance: 6,582

5 March 2020 Quarter-final	Randers FC	1–2	SønderjyskE	Cepheus Park Randers, Randers
17:45 CET	Greve 5'; Lauenborg (yellow card) 40'; Kehinde (yellow card) 70'	Horsens Highlights	Bah (yellow card) 44'; Jacobsen 67'; Ólafsson (yellow card) 82'; Frederiksen 89' (yellow card) 90+5'	Attendance: 1,919; Referee: Peter Kjærsgaard-Andersen

10 June 2020 Semi-final	SønderjyskE	2–1	Horsens	Sydbank Park, Haderslev
18:00 CEST	Ekani (yellow card) 51'; Eskesen 63' (Bah); Jónsson (yellow card) 81'; Jacobsen 89'	AC Horsens Report	Okosun 53' (Prip)	Attendance: 0 Referee: Jakob Kehlet

1 July 2020 Final	SønderjyskE	2–0	AaB	Blue Water Arena, Esbjerg
20:00 CEST	Eskesen (yellow card) 23' (yellow-red card) 65'; Jónsson (yellow card) 32'; Jacobsen 45+5' 56'; Bah (yellow card) 46'; Jakobsen (yellow card) 49'; Banggaard (yellow card) 75'		Okore (yellow card) 13'; Christensen (yellow card) 21'; Ross (yellow card) 71'	Attendance: 1,750; Referee: Jørgen Daugbjerg Burchardt

== Statistics ==
=== Goalscorers ===
Rank	No.	Pos	Nat	Name	Superliga	Danish Cup	Total
1	8	FW	(Denmark)	Christian Jakobsen	8	1	9
2	10	MF	(Netherlands)	Mart Lieder	6	2	8
3	27	FW	(Denmark)	Anders K. Jacobsen	3	4	7
4	15	FW	(Denmark)	Johan Absalonsen	3	1	4
5	17	MF	(New Zealand)	Marco Rojas	2	1	3
5	20	FW	(Denmark)	Peter Christiansen	3	0	3
7	47	FW	(Ukraine)	Artem Dovbyk	2	0	2
7	90	MF	(Denmark)	Mads Albæk	2	0	2
9	2	DF	(Denmark)	Stefan Gartenmann	1	0	1
9	6	MF	(Iceland)	Eggert Jónsson	1	0	1
9	7	MF	(Denmark)	Julius Eskesen	0	1	1
9	9	MF	(Denmark)	Alexander Bah	1	0	1
9	14	MF	(Portugal)	João Pereira	1	0	1
9	21	FW	(Denmark)	Jeppe Simonsen	1	0	1
9	22	MF	(Denmark)	Emil Frederiksen	0	1	1
9	26	DF	(Denmark)	Patrick Banggaard	1	0	1
9	77	MF	(Nigeria)	Rilwan Hassan	1	0	1
Own goals					1	0	1
Totals					37	11	48

Last updated: 1 July 2021

=== Clean sheets ===
Rank	No.	Pos	Nat	Name	Superliga	Danish Cup	Total
1	28	GK	(Germany)	Sebastian Mielitz	6	1	7
2	1	GK	(Serbia)	Nikola Mirković	0	1	1
Totals					6	2	8

Last updated: 1 July 2021
