= 2023–24 Danish 1st Division =

84th season of Danish 1st Division

NordicBet Liga
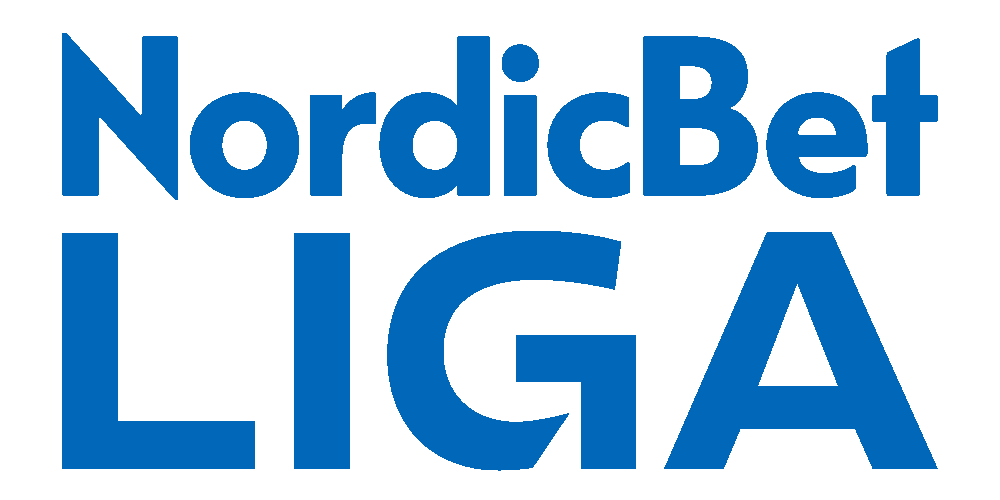
- Season: 2023–24
- Champions: Sønderjyske; 2nd Danish 1st Division title
- Promoted: Sønderjyske; AaB
- Relegated: Næstved; FC Helsingør
- Matches: 192
- Goals: 570 (2.97 per match)
- Top goalscorer: Sebastian Pingel (Hillerød) (18 goals)
- Biggest home win: Sønderjyske 6–0 AC Horsens (12 August 2023)
- Biggest away win: HB Køge 1–7; B.93 (11 August 2023)
- Highest scoring: HB Køge 1–7; B.93 (11 August 2023); Vendsyssel 4–4 Hillerød (23 February 2024)
- Highest attendance: 10,044; AaB 2–3 Hobro (5 May 2024)
- Average attendance: 2,226

The 2023–24 Danish 1st Division (known as the NordicBet Liga due to sponsorship by NordicBet) marked the 28th season of the league operating as the second tier of Danish football and the 84th season overall under the 1st Division name. The league is governed by the Danish Football Association (DBU).

== Participants ==
Horsens and AaB finished the 2022–23 season of the Superliga in 11th and 12th place, respectively, and were relegated to the 1st Division. They replaced Vejle BK and Hvidovre IF, who were promoted to the 2023–24 Danish Superliga.

Kolding IF and B.93 won promotion from the 2022–23 Danish 2nd Division. They replaced Fremad Amager and Nykøbing FC.

=== Stadia and locations ===
Locations of the 2023–24 Danish 1st Division teams.

Club	Location	Stadium	Turf	Capacity	2022–23 position
AaB	Aalborg	Aalborg Portland Park	Hybrid	13,797	SL 11th
AC Horsens	Horsens	CASA Arena Horsens	Natural	10,400	SL 12th
B.93	Copenhagen	Østerbro Stadium; Vanløse Idrætspark (2024)	Natural; Artificial	7,000; 10,000	2D 2nd
FC Fredericia	Fredericia	Monjasa Park	Natural	4,000	7th
FC Helsingør	Helsingør	Helsingør Stadion	Natural	4,500	5th
HB Køge	Herfølge/Køge	Capelli Sport Stadion	Artificial	4,000	8th
Hillerød Fodbold	Hillerød	Right to Dream Park, Farum	Artificial	9,900	9th
Hobro IK	Hobro	DS Arena	Natural	10,700	10th
Kolding IF	Kolding	Autocentralen Park	Natural	10,000	2D 1st
Næstved BK	Næstved	Tintshop Park (until 2023); Slagelse Stadium (from 2024)	Natural	7,500; 10,000	6th
SønderjyskE	Haderslev	Sydbank Park	Natural	10,000	3rd
Vendsyssel FF	Hjørring	Hjørring Stadion	Natural	7,500	4th

=== Personnel and sponsoring ===
Note: Flags indicate national team as has been defined under FIFA eligibility rules. Players and Managers may hold more than one non-FIFA nationality.

Team	Head coach	Captain	Kit manufacturer	Shirt sponsor
AaB	(Netherlands) Menno van Dam	(Denmark) Lucas Andersen	Macron	Arbejdernes Landsbank
AC Horsens	(Denmark) Claus Troelsen	(Croatia) Matej Delac	Hummel	NG ZINK A/S
B.93	(Denmark) Kim Engstrøm	(Denmark) Mikkel Mouritz Jensen	Adidas	Sparekassen Danmark
FC Fredericia	(Denmark) Michael Hansen	(Denmark) Christian Ege Nielsen	Hummel	Monjasa
FC Helsingør	(Brazil) Álvaro Santos	(Denmark) Nikolaj Hansen	Diadora	GardinXperten
HB Køge	(Denmark) Nicklas Pedersen	(Denmark) Mike Jensen	Capelli	Castus
Hillerød Fodbold	(Denmark) Christian Lønstrup	(Denmark) Jonathan Witt	Adidas	Dansk Varme Service
Hobro IK	(Denmark) Martin Thomsen	(Denmark) Jonas Damborg	Puma	DS Gruppen, Spar Nord
Kolding IF	(Denmark) Kristoffer Wichmann	(Denmark) Sebastian Sommer	Hummel	Mos Mosh
Næstved BK	(Denmark) Patrick Birch Braune	(Denmark) Jesper Christiansen	Joma	Sydbank, Meny, Mærk Næstved
SønderjyskE	(Denmark) Thomas Nørgaard	(Denmark) Marc Dal Hende	Hummel	Danfoss
Vendsyssel FF	(Denmark) Bo Zinck	(Denmark) Mikkel Wohlgemuth	Select	Nordjyske Bank

=== Managerial changes ===
Team	Outgoing manager	Manner of departure	Date of vacancy	Replaced by	Date of appointment	Position in table
HB Køge	(Denmark) Daniel Agger	Mutual consent	2 June 2023	(Denmark) Nicklas Pedersen	5 June 2023	Pre-season
AC Horsens	(Denmark) Jens Berthel Askou	Signed by IFK Göteborg	7 June 2023	(Sweden) Joakim Persson	28 June 2023	Pre-season
Næstved BK	(Denmark) Peter Bonde	Sacked	10 September 2023	(Denmark) Patrick Birch Braune	15 September 2023	12th
Vendsyssel FF	(Denmark) Henrik Pedersen	Signed by Sheffield Wednesday	20 October 2023	(Denmark) Bo Zinck	2 November 2023	6th
FC Helsingør	(Denmark) Daniel K. Pedersen	Resigned	23 October 2023	(Brazil) Álvaro Santos	23 October 2023	11th
AC Horsens	(Sweden) Joakim Persson	Sacked	13 March 2024	(Denmark) Claus Troelsen	13 March 2024	8th
AaB	(Sweden) Oscar Hiljemark	Signed by IF Elfsborg	16 April 2024	(Norway) Mathias Haugaasen	16 April 2024	2nd
AaB	(Norway) Mathias Haugaasen	End of tenure as caretaker	27 May 2024	(Netherlands) Menno van Dam	27 May 2024	2nd

== League table ==
Pos	Team	Pld	W	D	L	GF	GA	GD	Pts	Promotion or Relegation
1	AaB	22	15	6	1	48	22	+26	51	Qualification to Promotion Group
2	SønderjyskE	22	15	4	3	58	24	+34	49	Qualification to Promotion Group
3	Vendsyssel	22	10	6	6	34	28	+6	36	Qualification to Promotion Group
4	FC Fredericia	22	9	8	5	34	27	+7	35	Qualification to Promotion Group
5	Kolding	22	10	3	9	34	32	+2	33	Qualification to Promotion Group
6	Hobro	22	10	3	9	26	24	+2	33	Qualification to Promotion Group
7	Hillerød	22	8	6	8	39	32	+7	30	Qualification to Relegation Group
8	B.93	22	8	4	10	26	37	−11	28	Qualification to Relegation Group
9	AC Horsens	22	7	4	11	28	35	−7	25	Qualification to Relegation Group
10	HB Køge	22	5	3	14	24	50	−26	18	Qualification to Relegation Group
11	Næstved	22	1	11	10	25	42	−17	14	Qualification to Relegation Group
12	FC Helsingør	22	2	6	14	23	46	−23	12	Qualification to Relegation Group

Updated to match(es) played on 10 March 2024. Source: Danish FA
Rules for classification: 1) points; 2) goal difference; 3) number of goals scored

== Promotion Group ==
The top 6 teams will compete for 2 spots in the 2024–25 Danish Superliga. Points and goals carried over in full from the regular season.

Pos	Team	Pld	W	D	L	GF	GA	GD	Pts	Qualification or relegation	SØN	AAB	KOL	HOB	FRE	VEN
1	SønderjyskE (C, P)	32	20	8	4	71	29	+42	68	Promotion to Danish Superliga	—	1–0	1–1	2–0	2–1	0–0
2	AaB (P)	32	19	8	5	66	38	+28	65	Promotion to Danish Superliga	1–0	—	3–3	2–3	1–0	4–1
3	Kolding	32	14	7	11	52	46	+6	49		0–3	2–3	—	2–1	4–0	0–0
4	Hobro	32	14	5	13	42	40	+2	47		2–2	2–1	1–1	—	1–2	4–1
5	FC Fredericia	32	13	8	11	46	42	+4	47		0–2	2–1	0–1	0–1	—	3–1
6	Vendsyssel	32	11	10	11	45	50	−5	43		0–0	2–2	2–4	3–1	1–4	—

Legend: Blue = home team win; Yellow = draw; Red = away team win.
Rules for classification: 1) Points; 2) Goal difference; 3) Goals scored; 4) Away goals scored; 5) Play-off (played on neutral ground if determining teams for different rounds); 6) Draw.
(C) Champions; (P) Promoted

== Relegation Group ==
The bottom 6 teams will compete to avoid the 2 relegations to the 2024–25 Danish 2nd Division. Points and goals carried over in full from the regular season.

Pos	Team	Pld	W	D	L	GF	GA	GD	Pts	Qualification or relegation	HIL	ACH	B93	HBK	NST	HEL
1	Hillerød	32	13	10	9	58	41	+17	49		—	2–0	4–0	1–1	0–0	3–2
2	AC Horsens	32	12	7	13	37	45	−8	43		1–0	—	1–1	1–1	1–0	1–1
3	B.93	32	11	6	15	45	55	−10	39		1–3	0–1	—	7–1	2–0	2–2
4	HB Køge	32	9	7	16	43	66	−23	34		1–1	5–0	5–3	—	1–0	3–1
5	Næstved (R)	32	5	12	15	33	53	−20	27	Relegation to 2nd Division	1–3	0–2	1–0	2–1	—	1–0
6	FC Helsingør (R)	32	2	10	20	32	65	−33	16	Relegation to 2nd Division	2–2	0–1	0–3	0–0	1–3	—

Legend: Blue = home team win; Yellow = draw; Red = away team win.
Rules for classification: 1) Points; 2) Goal difference; 3) Goals scored; 4) Away goals scored; 5) Play-off (played on neutral ground if determining teams for different rounds); 6) Draw.
(R) Relegated

== Season statistics ==
=== Top scorers ===
Rank	Player	Club	Goals
1	(Denmark) Sebastian Pingel	Hillerød	18
2	(Denmark) Peter Christiansen	Sønderjyske	17
3	(Denmark) Thomas Mikkelsen	Kolding	12
4	(Denmark) Carl Lange	Vendsyssel	11
4	(Denmark) Mathias Jørgensen	AaB	11
6	(Denmark) Søren Andreasen	Sønderjyske	10
6	(Denmark) Sebastian Clemmensen	B.93	10
8	(Denmark) Mikkel Agger	Sønderjyske	9
8	(Denmark) Anders K. Jacobsen	AC Horsens	9
8	(Denmark) Muamer Brajanac	Hobro IK	9

=== Clean sheets ===
Rank	Player	Club	Clean sheets
1	(Denmark) Nicolai Flø	Sønderjyske	13
2	(Denmark) William Lykke	Hillerød	9
3	(Denmark) Marcus Bundgaard	Vendsyssel	8
3	(Croatia) Matej Delač	AC Horsens	8
5	(Croatia) Josip Posavec	AaB	7
6	(Denmark) Jonathan Fischer	Hobro	6
7	(Philippines) Michael Falkesgaard	B.93	5
7	(Denmark) Valdemar Birksø	Fredericia	5
9	(Turkey) Berkant Bayrak	HB Køge	4

=== Discipline ===
==== Player ====
- Most yellow cards: 10
  - (Denmark) Casper Jørgensen (HB Køge)
- Most red cards: 2
  - (Portugal) Pedro Ferreira (AaB)
  - (Denmark) Casper Gedsted (HB Køge)

==== Club ====
- Most yellow cards: 57
  - Næstved
- Most red cards: 4
  - AaB
- Fewest yellow cards: 34
  - Sønderjyske
  - B.93
- Fewest red cards: 0
  - Kolding

== Attendances ==
#	Club	Average
1	AaB	7,427
2	SønderjyskE	4,038
3	Kolding	2,611
4	B.93	1,828
5	Horsens	1,785
6	Hobro	1,546
7	Vendsyssel	1,517
8	Køge	1,363
9	Næstved	1,289
10	Fredericia	985
11	Helsingør	872
12	Hillerød	592
