= Peter Christiansen (footballer, born 1999) =

Danish footballer (born 1999)

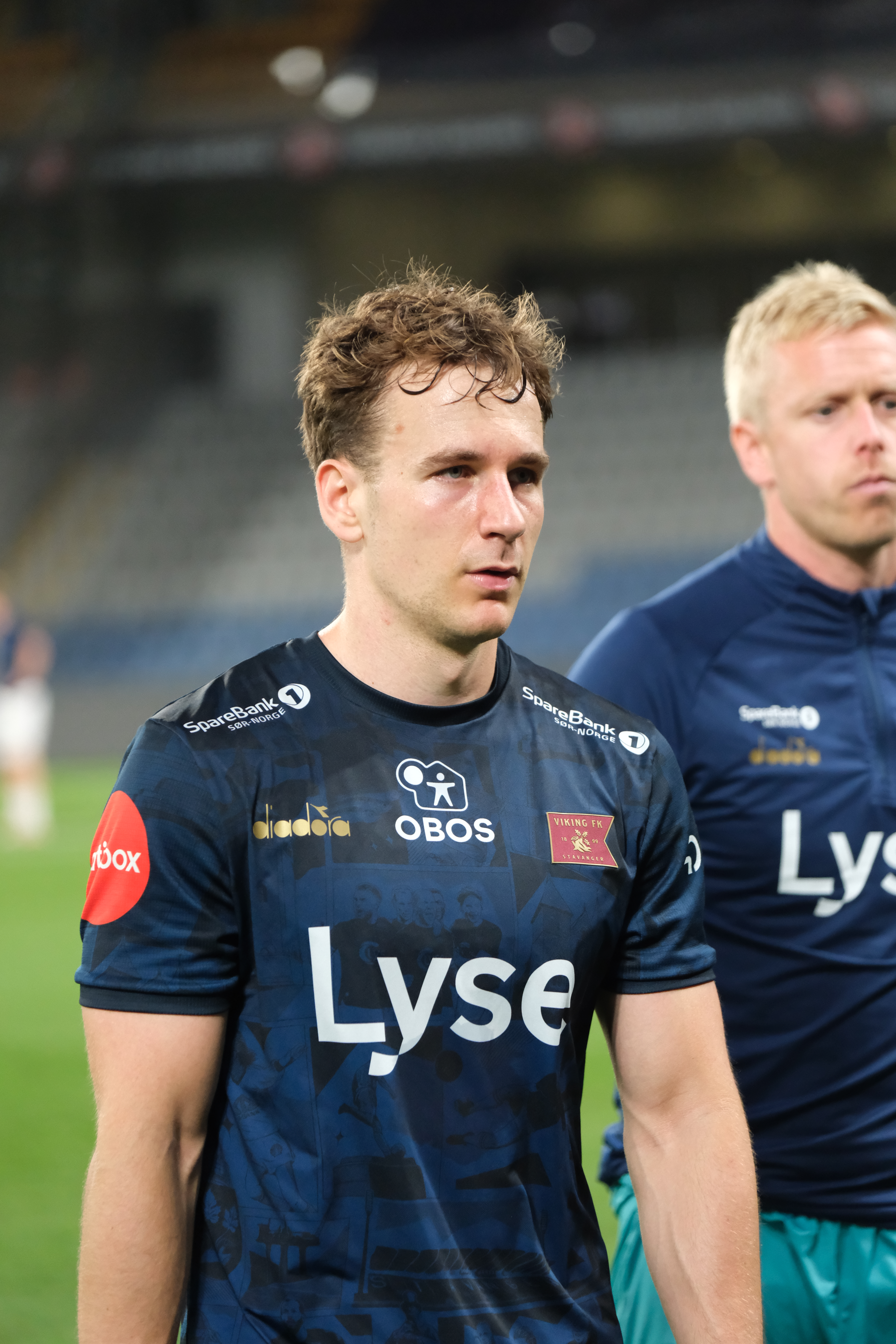
- Christiansen in 2025

Personal information
- Full name: Peter Buch Christiansen
- Date of birth: 2 December 1999 (age 26)
- Place of birth: Starup, Denmark
- Height: 1.75 m (5 ft 9 in)
- Position: Striker

Team information
- Current team: Viking
- Number: 20

Youth career
- Starup UIF
- Haderslev FK
- SønderjyskE

Senior career*
Years	Team	Apps	(Gls)
2018–2024	SønderjyskE	120	(34)
2021	→ Helsingør (loan)	12	(3)
2024–	Viking	83	(39)
- * Club domestic league appearances and goals as of 21 November 2026

Peter Buch Christiansen (born 2 December 1999) is a Danish professional footballer who plays as a striker for Eliteserien club Viking.

== Career ==
After a good season for the SønderjyskE under-17 squad, Christiansen signed a three-year youth contract with the club. He made his senior debut on 8 December 2018, against Hobro IK, where he started on the pitch but was replaced by Rasmus Vinderslev in the 68th minute. Later that month he signed a new three-year contract, starting after the expiry of his youth contract in summer 2019.

On 17 June 2021 Christiansen signed on loan for FC Helsingør for the 2021–22 season. The loan ended early in December 2021, due to lack of playing time at Helsingør.

In March 2024, Christiansen joined Eliteserien club Viking. He was Viking's top scorer with 14 goals as the club won the 2025 Eliteserien.

== Career statistics ==
As of match played 21 November 2026

Appearances and goals by club, season and competition
Club	Season	League			National cup (Note: Includes Danish Cup, Norwegian Football Cup)		Continental		Total	
Club	Season	Division	Apps	Goals	Apps	Goals	Apps	Goals	Apps	Goals
Sønderjyske	2018–19	Danish Superliga	12	2	1	0	—		13	2
Sønderjyske	2019–20	Danish Superliga	18	3	2	0	—		20	3
Sønderjyske	2020–21	Danish Superliga	23	0	6	1	—		29	1
Sønderjyske	2021–22	Danish Superliga	15	3	2	1	—		17	4
Sønderjyske	2022–23	Danish 1st Division	30	9	6	1	—		36	10
Sønderjyske	2023–24	Danish 1st Division	22	17	2	0	—		24	17
Sønderjyske	Total		120	34	19	3	—		139	37
Helsingør (loan)	2021–22	Danish 1st Division	12	3	3	0	—		15	3
Viking	2024	Eliteserien	28	6	4	3	—		32	9
Viking	2025	Eliteserien	29	14	7	4	1 (Note: Appearance in UEFA Conference League)	0	37	18
Viking	2026	Eliteserien	26	19	1	0	6 (Note: Appearance in UEFA Champions League)	3	33	22
Viking	Total		83	39	12	7	7	3	102	49
Career total			215	76	34	11	6	3	256	89

== Honours ==
SønderjyskE

- Danish Cup: 2019–20

Viking

- Eliteserien: 2025

Individual

- Danish 1st Division Player of the Season: 2023–24
- Eliteserien Player of the Month: October 2025
