= Nicholas Marfelt =

Danish footballer (born 1994)

Personal information
- Date of birth: 15 September 1994 (age 32)
- Place of birth: Brønshøj, Denmark
- Height: 1.87 m (6 ft 2 in)
- Position: Left-back

Youth career
- –2008: Hvidovre
- 2008–2012: Nordsjælland
- 2012–2013: Hvidovre

Senior career*
Years	Team	Apps	(Gls)
2013–2016	Hvidovre	9	(1)
2016–2017	Helsingør	16	(3)
2017–2020	SønderjyskE	62	(0)
2017–2018	→ Sparta Rotterdam (loan)	7	(0)
2020–2022	HB Køge	20	(2)
2022–2023	Brønshøj	35	(2)
2023	Ishøj IF	4	(0)
2024	Brønshøj	7	(1)
- * Club domestic league appearances and goals as of 19:25, 10 May 2024 (UTC)

Nicholas Marfelt (born 15 September 1994) is a Danish footballer who plays as a left-back.

== Football career ==
Marfelt progressed through the youth academy of Hvidovre IF apart from a four-year spell in the renowned Nordsjælland academy. He joined FC Helsingør as a senior player in 2016.

On 30 January 2017, it was announced that Marfelt had moved to SønderjyskE, where he had signed a three-and-a-half-year contract. He had previously been on a trial with Brøndby, which, however, did not result in a contract. He made his Danish Superliga debut for SønderjyskE on 12 March 2017 in a game against OB. Just six months after signing with SønderjyskE, Marfelt joined Dutch Eredivisie club Sparta Rotterdam on a loan agreement valid for the remainder of the 2017–18 season. He was released from his loan only six months into the deal due to lacking playing time, and returned to SønderjyskE.

On 30 July 2020, it was announced that HB Køge had signed Marfelt on a two-year contract. He immediately scored in his debut for the club, helping secure a 2–1 win over his former team, Hvidovre, on 11 September. On 6 January 2022 Køge confirmed, that Marfelt had got his contract terminated by mutual consent, retiring from professional football to instead focus on studying.

On 16 January 2022, Marfelt signed with Denmark Series club Brønshøj Boldklub on an amateur deal. Marfelt left the club in June 2023. Later in the same month, he joined Ishøj IF. In February 2024, Marfelt returned to Brønshøj Boldklub on a deal until June 2024. He left the club in August 2024.

== Honours ==
SønderjyskE

- Danish Cup: 2019–20
