= Lawrence Thomas (soccer) =

Australian soccer player (born 1992)

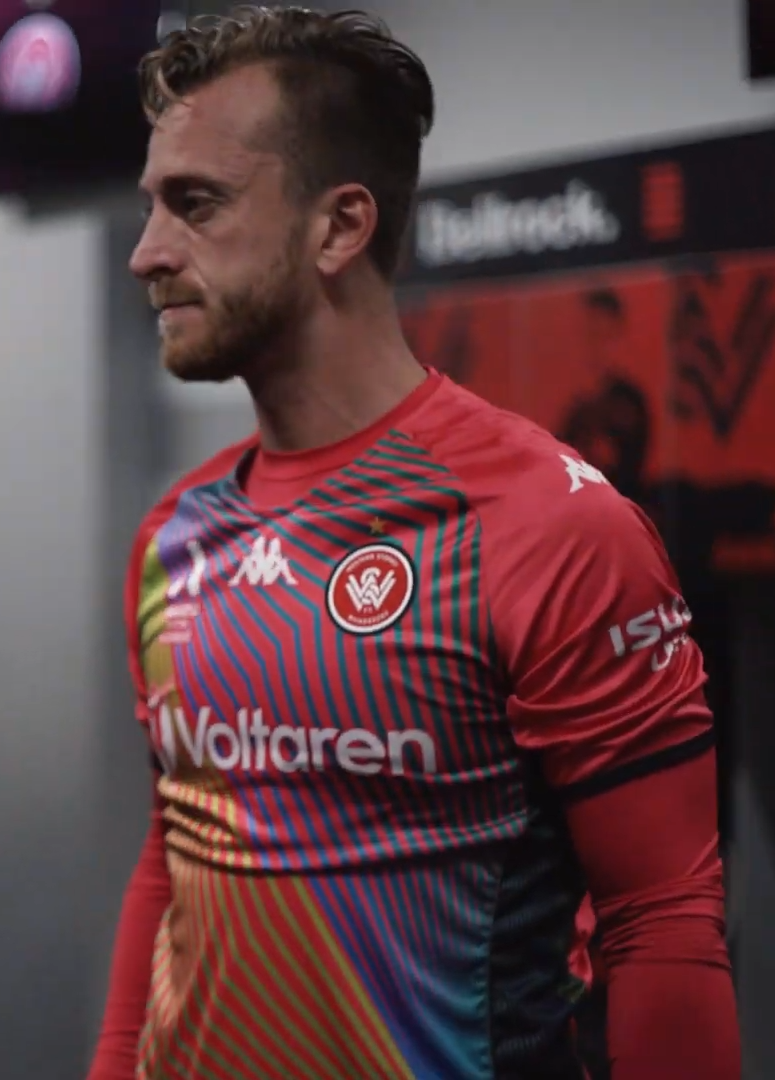
- Thomas with Western Sydney Wanderers in 2023

Personal information
- Full name: Lawrence Andrew Kingsley Thomas
- Date of birth: 9 May 1992 (age 34)
- Place of birth: Toongabbie, Australia
- Height: 1.91 m (6 ft 3 in)
- Position: Goalkeeper

Team information
- Current team: Western Sydney Wanderers
- Number: 20

Youth career
- Winston Hills Bears
- Marconi Stallions
- Bankstown City Lions
- Blacktown City
- 2009–2010: AIS

Senior career*
| Years | Team | Apps | (Gls) |
| 2010–2011 | Bankstown City | 25 | (0) |
| 2011 | Sheffield United | 0 | (0) |
| 2011–2020 | Melbourne Victory | 112 | (0) |
| 2012 | → Bentleigh Greens (loan) | 19 | (0) |
| 2020–2022 | SønderjyskE | 56 | (0) |
| 2022– | Western Sydney Wanderers | 78 | (0) |

International career^{‡}
| 2007–2008 | Australia U17 | 4 | (0) |
| 2009 | Australia U20 | 1 | (0) |
| 2021 | Australia | 1 | (0) |
- * Club domestic league appearances and goals as of 1 January 2026 ‡ National team caps and goals as of 12 June 2021

Lawrence Andrew Kingsley Thomas (born 9 May 1992) is an Australian professional soccer player who plays as a goalkeeper for Australian A-league club Western Sydney Wanderers and the Australia national team, having previously represented Australia at Australia U-17s and Australia U-20s.

Thomas is Melbourne Victory's most capped goalkeeper, with 151 appearances in all competitions.

== Club career ==
=== Early career ===
Born in Sydney, Australia, Thomas played for NSW Premier League club Marconi Stallions, Blacktown City Demons and the Australian Institute of Sport for the National Youth League season. Thomas was signed to Bankstown City for the 2010 NSW Premier League season in which Bankstown finished 8th.

Thomas went on a trial with Football League Championship club Coventry City F.C. in 2010, however this was not successful and was released. In 2011 fellow Championship club Sheffield United signed Thomas until the end of the 2010–11 season.

=== Melbourne Victory ===
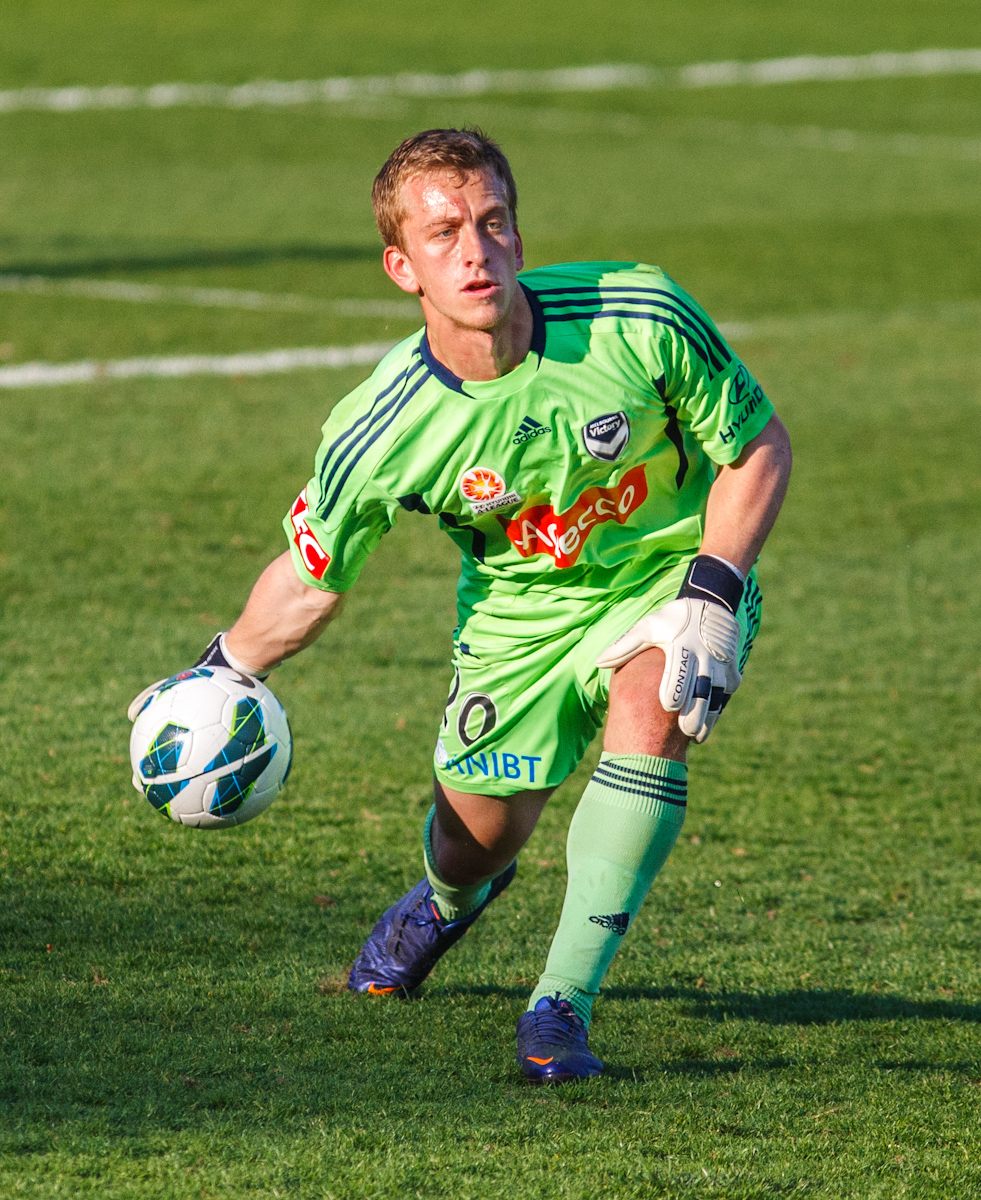
Thomas playing for Melbourne Victory in 2012

In September 2011, Thomas began trialling with A-League club Melbourne Victory. On 15 September the club announced that he had signed a two-year contract.

Thomas made his debut with Melbourne Victory as a player in the Round 5 clash with reigning premiers and champions Brisbane Roar at Docklands Stadium, coming on as a substitute after Victory first choice goalkeeper Ante Čović was sent off by referee Ben Williams for bringing down a Roar player in the Penalty area. He made an impressive debut, pulling off brilliant saves and helping Victory to a two all draw. Thomas made his second appearance in the Round 6 clash against A-League runners-up Central Coast, again putting up an impressive performance, pulling off brilliant saves and keeping a clean sheet in the Victory's nil-all draw.

Thomas made his third appearance in the Round 1 clash against crosstown rivals Melbourne Heart. Despite putting up an impressive performance, and making several brilliant saves, the Victory went down 2–1 to the Heart, with goals coming from David Williams and Dylan Macallister.

While Thomas improved, he would struggle to get regular game time, often being the second choice goal keeper behind Covic, Nathan Coe and later Danny Vukovic.

A drop in form from Coe in the latter stages of the 2013/14 season would see Thomas get a chance to become the number one keeper but failed to grasp it, allowing Coe to be recalled back into the starting lineup. A year later a similar situation arose, however this time through a Coe injury. This time Thomas made the most of the opportunity, putting in consistently good performances, culminating in a very good albeit somewhat quiet game in the grand final against Sydney FC, to make it hard for Coe to return to the team as first choice keeper.

Coe would depart the club at the off-season with most assuming that meant Thomas would be taking the number one goal keeping position. However, in a slightly surprising move, Melbourne Victory would sign Perth Glory goalkeeper Danny Vukovic meaning that yet again, Thomas would have to settle for the backup 'keeping spot again.

In the 2015–16 season, Vukovic would make a decent start to the season but then, against Brisbane Roar, would concede five goals, opening the door up again for Thomas to come in to the side again and wouldn't go out of the side for the rest of the year.

Vukovic would depart for Sydney FC at the end of the season, which again most people thought that Thomas would become the number one 'keeper. This would finally happen with Victory signing a former backup 'keeper from the Central Coast Mariners as a backup for Thomas.

During the 2016–17 season, Thomas would put in consistent performances, with the exception of the derby which ended in a 4–1 defeat.

On 5 May 2018, Lawrence was named the best on ground in his team's 1–0 grand final win over Newcastle Jets, and he received the Joe Marston Medal.

=== SønderjyskE ===
In July 2020, the Victory announced that Thomas had left the club to pursue overseas opportunities. On 2 August 2020, Lawrence signed a 2-year deal with Danish Superliga club SønderjyskE.

=== Western Sydney Wanderers ===
On 30 May 2022, it was announced that Thomas signed a three-year contract with Western Sydney Wanderers in May 2022.

== Career statistics ==
As of match played on 27 April 2024

Appearances and goals by club, season and competition
| Club | Season | League | | | National Cup | | Continental | | Other | | Total | |
| Club | Season | Division | Apps | Goals | Apps | Goals | Apps | Goals | Apps | Goals | Apps | Goals |
|---|---|---|---|---|---|---|---|---|---|---|---|---|
| Melbourne Victory | 2011–12 | A-League | 2 | 0 | — | | — | | — | | 2 | 0 |
| Melbourne Victory | 2012–13 | A-League | 2 | 0 | — | | — | | — | | 2 | 0 |
| Melbourne Victory | 2013–14 | A-League | 5 | 0 | — | | 3 (Note: Appearances in the AFC Champions League) | 0 | — | | 8 | 0 |
| Melbourne Victory | 2014–15 | A-League | 5 | 0 | 0 | 0 | — | | 2 (Note: Appearances in the 2014–15 A-League Finals series) | 0 | 7 | 0 |
| Melbourne Victory | 2015–16 | A-League | 4 | 0 | 0 | 0 | 5 | 0 | 1 (Note: Appearance in the 2015–16 A-League Finals series) | 0 | 10 | 0 |
| Melbourne Victory | 2016–17 | A-League | 26 | 0 | 0 | 0 | — | | 2 (Note: Appearances in the 2016–17 A-League Finals series) | 0 | 28 | 0 |
| Melbourne Victory | 2017–18 | A-League | 25 | 0 | 0 | 0 | 5 | 0 | 3 (Note: Appearances in the 2017–18 A-League Finals series) | 0 | 33 | 0 |
| Melbourne Victory | 2018–19 | A-League | 22 | 0 | 0 | 0 | 4 | 0 | 2 (Note: Appearances in the 2018–19 A-League Finals series) | 0 | 28 | 0 |
| Melbourne Victory | 2019–20 | A-League | 21 | 0 | 1 | 0 | 4 | 0 | — | | 26 | 0 |
| Melbourne Victory | Total | | 112 | 0 | 1 | 0 | 21 | 0 | 10 | 0 | 144 | 0 |
| Sønderjyske | 2020–21 | Danish Superliga | 32 | 0 | 1 | 0 | — | | 1 (Note: Appearance in the UEFA Europa League) | 0 | 34 | 0 |
| Sønderjyske | 2021–22 | Danish Superliga | 24 | 0 | 0 | 0 | — | | — | | 24 | 0 |
| Sønderjyske | Total | | 56 | 0 | 1 | 0 | 0 | 0 | 1 | 0 | 58 | 0 |
| Western Sydney Wanderers | 2022–23 | A-League Men | 26 | 0 | 0 | 0 | — | | 1 (Note: Appearance in the 2022–23 A-League Men Finals series) | 0 | 27 | 0 |
| Western Sydney Wanderers | 2023–24 | A-League Men | 17 | 0 | 3 | 0 | — | | — | | 20 | 0 |
| Western Sydney Wanderers | Total | | 43 | 0 | 3 | 0 | 0 | 0 | 1 | 0 | 47 | 0 |
| Career totals | | | 211 | 0 | 5 | 0 | 21 | 0 | 12 | 0 | 249 | 0 |

== International career ==
Thomas has represented Australia at 2008 Qantas Joeys under-16 ASEAN Youth Championship 2009 HKFC IP Global Soccer 7s U-17s and Australia U-20 level, with four caps at under-17 level and one cap at under-20 level.

On 7 March 2011 he was selected to represent the Australia Olympic football team in an Asian Olympic Qualifier match against Iraq.

On 11 June 2021, Thomas made his debut for Australia against Nepal, with Australia achieving a 3–0 victory.

== Personal life ==
Thomas was born on 9 May 1992 in Sydney, New South Wales, to an Australian father (deceased) and a mother of Italian descent. He went to St Pauls Catholic College in Greystanes.

== Honours ==
Melbourne Victory

- A-League Premiership: 2014–15
- A-League Championship: 2014–15, 2017–18
- FFA Cup: 2015

Individual

- Joe Marston Medal: 2018
- PFA A-League Team of the Season: 2022–23
- A-League Goalkeeper of the Year: 2022–23
- A-Leagues All Stars: 2024
