= Alexander Bah =

Danish footballer (born 1997)

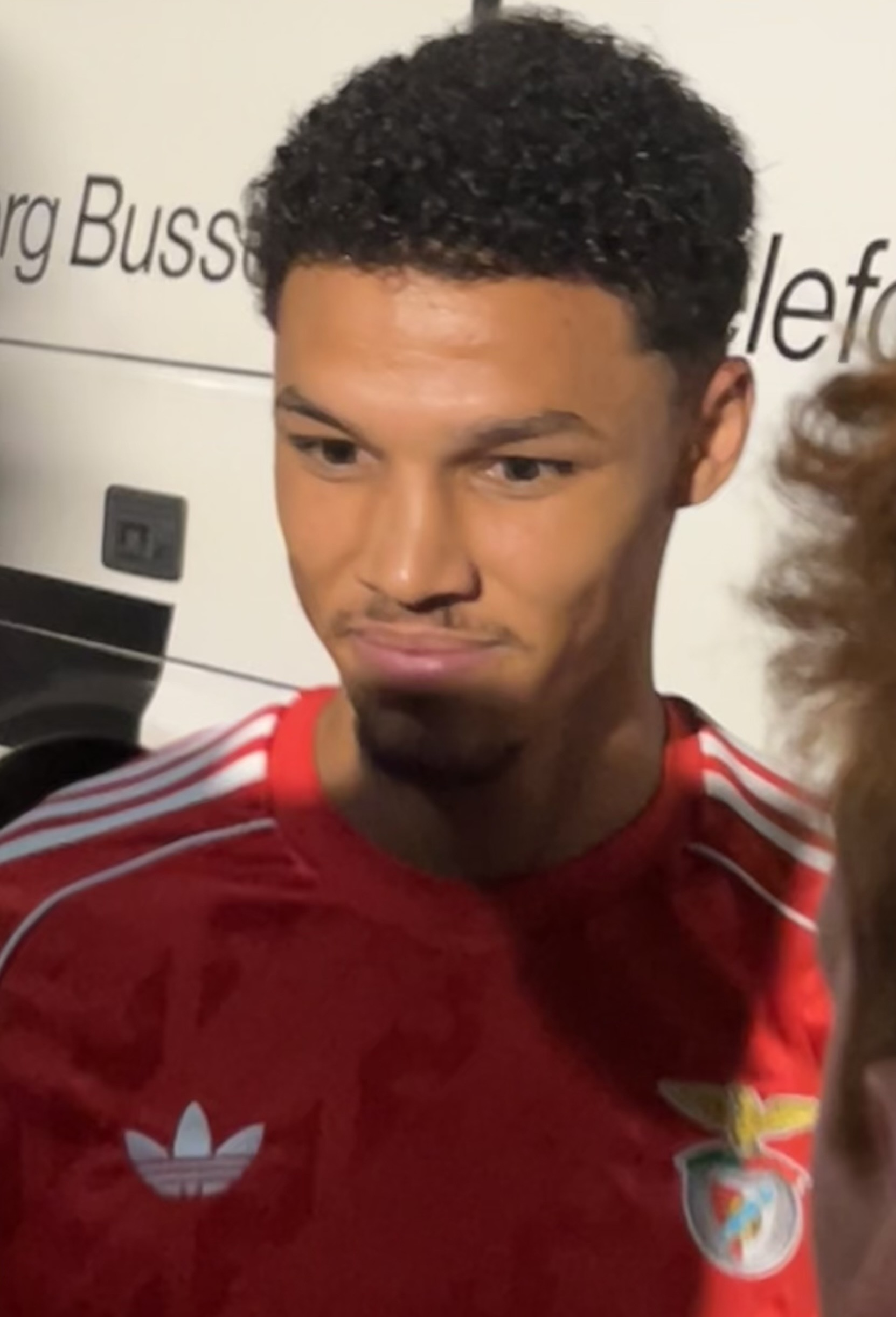
- Bah with Benfica in 2026

Personal information
- Full name: Alexander Hartmann Bah
- Date of birth: 9 December 1997 (age 28)
- Place of birth: Årslev, Denmark
- Height: 1.83 m (6 ft 0 in)
- Position: Right-back

Team information
- Current team: Benfica
- Number: 6

Youth career
- 1998–2011: Aarslev Boldklub
- 2011–2013: B 1913
- 2013–2014: Næsby
- 2014–2015: Ikast FS
- 2015–2016: Næsby

Senior career*
Years	Team	Apps	(Gls)
2016	Næsby	17	(0)
2016–2018	HB Køge	59	(8)
2018–2020	SønderjyskE	58	(6)
2021–2022	Slavia Prague	43	(4)
2022–	Benfica	80	(6)

International career^{‡}
2017	Denmark U20	4	(0)
2018–2019	Denmark U21	2	(0)
2020–	Denmark	25	(1)
- * Club domestic league appearances and goals as of 23:54, 11 October 2026 (UTC) ‡ National team caps and goals as of 22:10, 17 November 2026 (UTC)

Alexander Hartmann Bah (born 9 December 1997) is a Danish professional footballer who plays as a right-back for Primeira Liga club Benfica and the Denmark national team.

After coming through Næsby's youth academy, he was promoted to the first team in 2016, and later represented fellow Danish side HB Køge and spent two years with SønderjyskE in Danish Superliga. In January 2021, Bah joined Slavia Prague, where he won the Czech First League and Czech Cup in 2021 and was named the Czech First League's Defender of the Season in 2022, and then transferred to Benfica for €8 million.

After representing Denmark at various youth levels, Bah was called up to the full international team for the first time in November 2020. He scored on his international debut against Sweden, and went on to represent the side at the 2022 FIFA World Cup and UEFA Euro 2024.

== Early life ==
Bah was born in Årslev on the island of Funen, Denmark, and is of Danish and Gambian descent. He later attended efterskole education at ISI Idrætsefterskole in Ikast, where he also made appearances for local side Ikast FS.

== Club career ==
=== Early career ===
Bah started his footballing career with local club Aarslev Boldklub, where he played for ten years before joining B 1913. He joined Næsby Boldklub three years later, in the spring of 2013, because the club according to Bah "[...] had a good reputation for developing young players". Furthermore, his youth coach Andreas Bech had also moved to Næsby Boldklub, which was also a significant factor in Bah's choice. After attending ISI Idrætsefterskole in Ikast in 2014–15, he returned to Næsby.

=== Næsby Boldklub ===
Bah made his breakthrough on the first team of Næsby Boldklub in the spring of 2016. He started on the bench in the first three games of the season, where he impressed as a substitute. He made his first start in the fourth matchday of the spring against Avarta on 2 April 2016, which Næsby won 4–0 at home at ALPI Arena Næsby, putting on a strong performance. He continued the season as a starter during the spring of 2016, where he made a total of six assists in 16 appearances in the third-tier Danish 2nd Division.

=== HB Køge ===
In August 2016, it was announced that Bah moved to HB Køge, where he signed a three-year contract. He made his debut for the club in the Danish Cup as part of the starting lineup, where he played the first 60 minutes before being replaced by Ahmed Hassan in a 0–2 win over Karlslunde IF in the 1st round. In November 2017, he was named "Talent of the Year", also known as the "Danske Bank Award", for HB Køge in 2017.

=== SønderjyskE ===
On 7 August 2018, Bah signed a five-year contract with Danish Superliga club SønderjyskE. He arrived at the club as a right winger, but largely played as a right wing-back with great success, which, among other things, have contributed to SønderjyskE winning a Danish Cup title and Bah making his full international debut for the Denmark national team. He was among the three nominated for Superliga Player of the Month in November 2020, but saw the award go to Jesper Lindstrøm of Brøndby IF.

=== Slavia Prague ===
On 5 January 2021, Bah signed for Czech First League club Slavia Prague on a four-and-a-half-year contract. In doing so, SønderjyskE received a club record fee reported to be around DKK 13 million. He made his debut for the club as a starter on 16 January in a 3–1 win over Sigma Olomouc. Bah arrived at the club as a replacement for Vladimír Coufal, who left the for English Premier League side West Ham United, during the season, quickly became a starter in the right-back slot, after impressing his coach Jindřich Trpišovský for his defensive positioning and attacking play, helping his team win the domestic double of the Czech First League and Czech Cup.

The following season, Bah was named the Czech First League's Defender of the Season, making 26 appearances and scoring three goals as Slavia Prague finished runners-up behind Viktoria Plzeň, while also helping the club reached the quarter-finals of the inaugural UEFA Europa Conference League, where his team were eliminated, after losing 6–4 on aggregate to eventual finalists Feyenoord.

=== Benfica ===
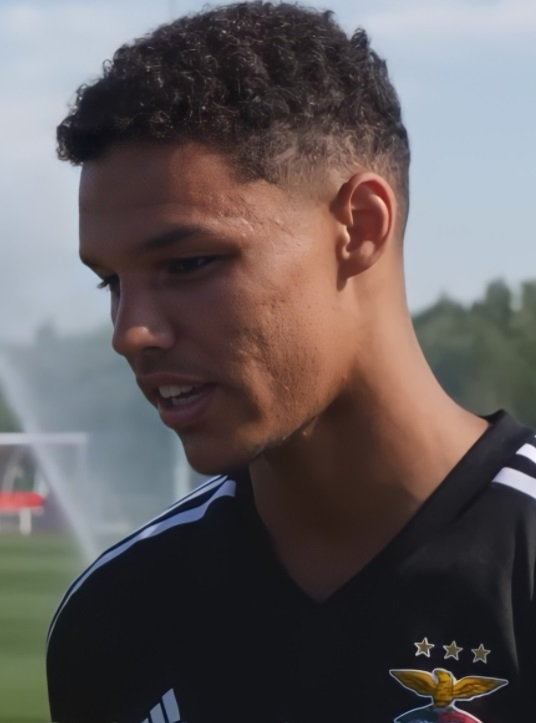
Bah in 2022

On 7 June 2022, Bah signed a five-year contract with Primeira Liga side Benfica, for a reported fee of €8 million, joining former Slavia Prague teammate Petar Musa. He made his debut for the club on 5 August, replacing Gilberto in the 63rd minute and providing the assist for Rafa Silva's goal in a 4–0 home win over Arouca in the Primeira Liga.

== International career ==
Bah represented Denmark at under-20 and under-21, for a total of 2 caps.

On 9 November 2020, he was called up to Kasper Hjulmand's senior squad for the friendly against Sweden due to several cancellations from, among others, the Danish national team players playing in England, due to the COVID-19 restrictions, as well as a case of COVID-19 in the squad, which had put several national team players in quarantine. He came on as a substitute at half-time during the match against Sweden and scored the final goal in a 2–0 win at Brøndby Stadium in his debut match, on 11 November 2020.

== Style of play ==
Bah is mainly known for his speed, energy and offensive capabilities, as well as his technique, creativity and crossing ability. He is capable of playing as a full-back or winger on the right flank. He is an aggressive player who attacks spaces and seeks to break deep blocks with accurate passes, capable of receiving a pass from on the byline and finding the penalty spot with a pinpoint cross to allow his teammate to convert.

== Career statistics ==
=== Club ===
As of match played 15 October 2026

Appearances and goals by club, season and competition
Club	Season	League			National cup (Note: Includes Danish Cup, Czech Cup, Taça de Portugal)		League cup (Note: Includes Taça da Liga)		Europe		Other		Total	
Club	Season	Division	Apps	Goals	Apps	Goals	Apps	Goals	Apps	Goals	Apps	Goals	Apps	Goals
Næsby	2015–16	Danish 2nd Division	16	0	0	0	—		—		—		16	0
Næsby	2016–17	Danish 2nd Division	1	0	—		—		—		—		1	0
Næsby	Total		17	0	0	0	—		—		—		17	0
HB Køge	2016–17	Danish 1st Division	27	4	4	0	—		—		—		31	4
HB Køge	2017–18	Danish 1st Division	30	3	3	1	—		—		—		33	4
HB Køge	2018–19	Danish 1st Division	2	1	—		—		—		—		2	1
HB Køge	Total		59	8	7	1	—		—		—		66	9
SønderjyskE	2018–19	Danish Superliga	21	2	3	1	—		—		2 (Note: Appearances in Danish Superliga relegation play-offs)	0	26	3
SønderjyskE	2019–20	Danish Superliga	29	1	5	0	—		—		—		34	1
SønderjyskE	2020–21	Danish Superliga	12	4	0	0	—		1 (Note: Appearance(s) in UEFA Europa League)	0	—		13	4
SønderjyskE	Total		62	7	8	1	—		1	0	2	0	73	8
Slavia Prague	2020–21	Czech First League	17	1	3	0	—		6	0	—		26	1
Slavia Prague	2021–22	Czech First League	26	3	1	0	—		15 (Note: Two appearances in UEFA Champions League, two appearances and one goal in UEFA Europa League, eleven appearances and two goals in UEFA Europa Conference League)	3	—		42	6
Slavia Prague	Total		43	4	4	0	—		21	3	—		68	7
Benfica	2022–23	Primeira Liga	28	1	3	0	1	0	10 (Note: Appearances in UEFA Champions League)	0	—		42	1
Benfica	2023–24	Primeira Liga	19	2	3	0	0	0	9 (Note: Three appearances in UEFA Champions League, six appearances in UEFA Europa League)	0	1 (Note: Appearance in Supertaça Cândido de Oliveira)	0	32	2
Benfica	2024–25	Primeira Liga	18	0	2	1	2	0	7	1	0	0	29	2
Benfica	2025–26	Primeira Liga	9	2	0	0	0	0	0	0	0	0	9	2
Benfica	2026–27	Primeira Liga	6	1	0	0	0	0	6	1	—		12	2
Benfica	Total		80	6	8	1	3	0	32	2	1	0	124	9
Career total			261	25	27	3	3	0	54	5	3	0	348	33

=== International ===
As of match played 17 November 2026

Appearances and goals by national team and year
National team	Year	Apps	Goals
Denmark	2020	1	1
Denmark	2021	1	0
Denmark	2022	4	0
Denmark	2023	3	0
Denmark	2024	11	0
Denmark	2025	0	0
Denmark	2026	5	0
Total		25	1

As of match played 7 June 2026
Scores and results list Denmark's goal tally first, score column indicates score after each Bah goal.

List of international goals scored by Alexander Bah
No.	Date	Venue	Cap	Opponent	Score	Result	Competition
1	11 November 2020	Brøndby Stadium, Brøndbyvester, Denmark	1	Sweden	2–0	2–0	Friendly

== Honours ==
SønderjyskE

- Danish Cup: 2019–20

Slavia Prague

- Czech First League: 2020–21
- Czech Cup: 2020–21

Benfica

- Primeira Liga: 2022–23
- Taça da Liga: 2024–25
- Supertaça Cândido de Oliveira: 2023

Individual

- Danish 1st Division Talent of the Year: 2017
- Czech First League Defender of the Season: 2022
