= Jeppe Simonsen =

Haitian footballer (born 1995)

Personal information
- Full name: Jeppe Friborg Simonsen
- Date of birth: 21 November 1995 (age 30)
- Place of birth: Kolding, Denmark
- Height: 1.84 m (6 ft 0 in)
- Positions: Full-back; winger

Team information
- Current team: BK Frem
- Number: 24

Youth career
- Haderslev FK
- Sønderjyske

Senior career*
Years	Team	Apps	(Gls)
2015–2022	Sønderjyske	105	(7)
2016–2017	→ HB Køge (loan)	19	(2)
2022–2023	Podbeskidzie	51	(4)
2023–2024	Académico de Viseu	5	(0)
2024	Sønderjyske	4	(0)
2025–2026	Fremad Amager	31	(4)
2026–	BK Frem	1	(0)

International career^{‡}
2014–2015	Denmark U20	2	(0)
2015	Denmark U21	1	(0)
2021–	Haiti	14	(2)
- * Club domestic league appearances and goals as of 4 October 2026 ‡ National team caps and goals as of 21 November 2024

Jeppe Friborg Simonsen (born 21 November 1995) is a professional footballer who plays as a full-back or winger for Danish 3rd Division club BK Frem. Born in Denmark, he plays for the Haiti national team.

== Club career ==
=== Sønderjyske ===
At the age of 19, Simonsen was promoted to the first team squad in January 2015. He also signed a new 3-year contract with SønderjyskE in January 2015.

Simonsen got his debut for SønderjyskE on 27 July 2014. He started on the bench, but replaced Silas Songani in the 74th minute in a 1–1 draw against Esbjerg fB in the Danish Superliga.

On 18 September 2015, Simonsen scored his first official goal for SønderjyskE, which became the matchwining goal. He came on the pitch in the 75nd minute replacing Andreas Oggesen, and scores to the final result, 2–1, in the 86th minute.

On 1 February 2018, Simonsen got his contract extended until the summer 2021.

==== Loan to HB Køge ====
In the summer 2016, Simonsen was loaned out to Danish 1st Division club HB Køge until the winter break. On 21 December 2016, HB Køge announced that they didn't want to keep the forward, because they were looking for a goal machine. He played 19 league matches scoring 2 goals, before returning to SønderjyskE.

=== Podbeskidzie ===
On 1 February 2022, Simonsen signed a two-and-a-half-year deal with Polish second division side Podbeskidzie Bielsko-Biała.

=== Académico de Viseu and return to Sønderjyske ===
On 24 August 2023, Simonsen joined Liga Portugal 2 club Académico de Viseu on a two-year contract.

On 14 August 2024, after making seven appearances for Académico de Viseu throughout the year, it was confirmed that Simonsen was training with his former club Sønderjyske. On 27 August 2024, Sønderjyske confirmed that Simonsen had signed a contract for the rest of 2024. In December, Sønderjyske confirmed that the parties did not extend the collaboration and therefore went their separate ways when the contract would expire on 31 December 2024.

=== Fremad Amager ===
On 7 February 2025, Simonsen moved to the Danish 1st Division side Fremad Amager. The club did not announce the duration of the contract.

=== BK Frem ===
On 22 September 2026, Simonsen signed a contract with BK Frem.

== International career ==
Born in Denmark, Simonsen is of Haitian descent. His birth parents are from Haiti, but he was adopted at a young age by a Danish family. A youth international for Denmark, he debuted for the Haiti national team in a 10–0 2022 FIFA World Cup qualification win over Turks and Caicos Islands on 5 June 2021.

=== International goals ===
Scores and results list Haiti's goal tally first.

List of international goals scored by Jeppe Simonsen
No.	Date	Venue	Team	Score	Result	Competition
1	14 June 2022	Félix Sánchez Olympic Stadium, Santo Domingo, Dominican Republic	Guyana	4–0	6–0	2022–23 CONCACAF Nations League B
2	28 March 2023	Estadio Panamericano, San Cristóbal, Dominican Republic	Bermuda	2–0	3–1	2022–23 CONCACAF Nations League B

== Honours ==
SønderjyskE

- Danish Cup: 2019–20
