= Pierre Kanstrup =

Danish footballer (born 1989)

Personal information
- Date of birth: 21 February 1989 (age 37)
- Place of birth: Brøndby, Denmark
- Height: 1.88 m (6 ft 2 in)
- Position: Centre-back

Youth career
- 1994–2008: Brøndby

Senior career*
Years	Team	Apps	(Gls)
2008–2011	Brøndby	7	(1)
2010	→ Lyngby (loan)	4	(0)
2011	→ Brønshøj (loan)	14	(3)
2011–2012	Brønshøj	41	(5)
2012–2014	Fredericia	49	(6)
2014	→ SønderjyskE (loan)	14	(0)
2014–2017	SønderjyskE	101	(4)
2017–2018	AGF	50	(2)
2019	BB Erzurumspor	14	(0)
2019	Vålerenga	11	(0)
2020–2022	SønderjyskE	40	(0)
2021–2022	→ Fremad Amager (loan)	24	(0)
2022–2023	Fremad Amager	21	(0)
2023–2024	Brønshøj		

International career
2005	Denmark U16	2	(0)
2005	Denmark U17	4	(0)
2006–2007	Denmark U18	4	(0)
2007–2008	Denmark U19	5	(0)
2009	Denmark U21	1	(0)
- * Club domestic league appearances and goals

Pierre Kanstrup (born 21 February 1989) is a Danish former professional footballer who played as a centre-back. A versatile defender, his professional career spanned 16 years, and led him from the Danish lower divisions to the Danish Superliga, alongside stints in Turkey and Norway.

Kanstrup has played for various Danish youth sides, including the Denmark national under-21 team.

== Club career ==
=== Brøndby ===
Kanstrup played for Brøndby since his youth. On 5 April 2008, he made his professional debut when he came on as a substitute on for Mike Jensen in the 82nd minute in a 3–1 victory against AC Horsens. In the 2007–08 season, he made three appearances. In the 2008–09 season, he was permanently promoted to the first-team squad and played once in the Danish Superliga and in the second qualifying round for the UEFA Cup, and he also played three times in the Danish Cup. On 23 August 2009, Kanstrup scored his first goal in professional football in a 6–1 win over HB Køge.

Kanstrup played for Lyngby Boldklub on a six-month loan from Brøndby during the second half of the 2010–11 season. After a total of four league appearances, he returned to Brøndby.

=== Brønshøj and Fredericia ===
After six months in Brøndby again without an appearance, Kanstrup was loaned out again, this time to second-tier 1st Division club Brønshøj Boldklub. On 20 March 2011, he made his debut for Hvepsene in a 1–1 draw against FC Fyn. On 16 April 2011, he scored his first goal for Brønshøj in a 2–0 win over Hobro IK. Kanstrup was utilised in all matches for the club. For the new season, he signed a permanent deal with the club and made 24 league appearances in the 2011–12 season, in which he scored two goals. In the 2012–13 season he played three more times for Brønshøj and was even named team captain, before moving to division rivals Fredericia. He came to 28 appearances in the league, in which he scored three goals. The following season, he made 17 league appearances.

=== SønderjyskE ===
For the second half of the 2013–14 season, Kanstrup was loaned by Superliga club SønderjyskE and immediately became a regular starter in defense, making his debut in the 0–4 away win over Vestsjælland. The deal was made permanent on 11 June 2014, as he signed a three-year contract. In July 2015, he was named the new captain after Henrik Hansen and vice-captain Niels Lodberg had left the club. On 2 August 2015, he scored his first goal for the club in the 3–1 defeat against Copenhagen. Kanstrup appeared in all Superliga games in 2015–16 season, as SønderjyskE finished runner-up in the league and qualified for participation in the second qualifying round for the UEFA Europa League. There, the club advanced after knocking out Norwegian club Strømsgodset and Polish side Zagłębie Lubin, before they were eliminated in the play-off round after a late goal by Sparta Prague. Kanstrup was used in all games; in the preliminary round of the Superliga and in the championship round he came to a total of 36 appearances.

=== AGF ===
On 11 June 2017, Kanstrup moved to AGF on a two-year contract. With the Aarhus-based team he quickly fought for a regular starting spot and was used in 25 games in the regular season. He scored his first goal for the club in a 1–4 home loss to Nordsjælland on 27 October 2017. After only six months at the club, he was named team captain after the departure of Morten "Duncan" Rasmussen, which was the "natural choice" according to head coach David Nielsen. In the relegation round and in the subsequent play-offs he played in all ten games.

=== BB Erzurumspor and Vålerenga ===
In January 2019, he left Denmark and joined the Turkish Süper Lig club Büyükşehir Belediye Erzurumspor. After only half a year at club, he returned to Scandinavia to sign with Norwegian club Vålerenga on a six-month contract.

=== Return to SønderjyskE ===
On 27 December 2019, it was announced, that Kanstrup had returned to SønderjyskE Fodbold on a three-year contract. In his first season back at the club, he was part of the team winning the Danish Cup.

=== Fremad Amager ===
On 27 August 2021, Kanstrup was loaned out to Danish 1st Division club Fremad Amager for the rest of the season. He made his debut for the club on the same day against FC Fredericia. Shortly after his arrival, he was named captain of the team. On 26 May 2022 Fremad Amager confirmed, that they had signed Kanstrup permanently until June 2024. On 18 July 2023, after Fremad Amager was relegated to the 2023–24 Danish 2nd Division, the club confirmed that Kanstrup had left the club, as he got his contract terminated by mutual consent.

=== Brønshøj ===
After leaving Fremad Amager, Kanstrup signed for Denmark Series side Brønshøj Boldklub in July 2023: a club he had already played for previously, in 2011–12. After a single year at the club, Kanstrup retired in August 2024.

== Honours ==
SønderjyskE

- Danish Cup: 2019–20
