= Marcus Bundgaard =

Danish footballer (born 2001)

Personal information
- Full name: Marcus Bundgaard Sørensen
- Date of birth: 5 August 2001 (age 25)
- Place of birth: Brønderslev, Denmark
- Height: 1.97 m (6 ft 6 in)
- Position: Goalkeeper

Team information
- Current team: Sønderjyske
- Number: 16

Youth career
- –2013: Brønderslev
- 2013–2020: AaB

Senior career*
| Years | Team | Apps | (Gls) |
| 2020–2022 | Jammerbugt | 40 | (0) |
| 2022–2024 | Vendsyssel | 56 | (0) |
| 2024–2025 | IF Elfsborg | 13 | (0) |
| 2025– | Sønderjyske | 38 | (0) |
- * Club domestic league appearances and goals as of 19 May 2026

Marcus Bundgaard Sørensen (born 5 August 2001) is a Danish professional footballer who plays as a goalkeeper for Danish Superliga club Sønderjyske.

== Career ==
=== Club career ===
Bundgaard was born and raised in Brønderslev, and started his career in Brønderslev IF. In the summer 2013, he joined AaB's academy.

Bundgaard never got the chance in AaB on senior level and therefore, the 18-year-old goalkeeper moved to Danish 2nd Division club Jammerbugt FC in July 2020, where he became 1st goalkeeper and in his first season contributed to the club's promotion to the 2021-22 Danish 1st Division.

On 31 January 2022, Bundgaard was bought by neighboring club Vendsyssel FF, who played in the same league. Bundgaard was the first choice for the following two years before he was sold for a record amount for Vendsyssel.

On March 7, Bundgaard was presented as a new player in the Swedish Allsvenskan club IF Elfsborg, on a deal until the end of 2028. Bundgaard was the first choice for the first two months, but after the club hired manager Oscar Hiljemark in June 2024, Bundgaard was moved behind Isak Pettersson in the queue.

On February 3, 2025, following the departure of Jakob Busk, Sønderjyske confirmed that Bundgaard had joined the club on a deal until June 2028.
