= Jonas Thorsen =

Danish footballer (born 1990)

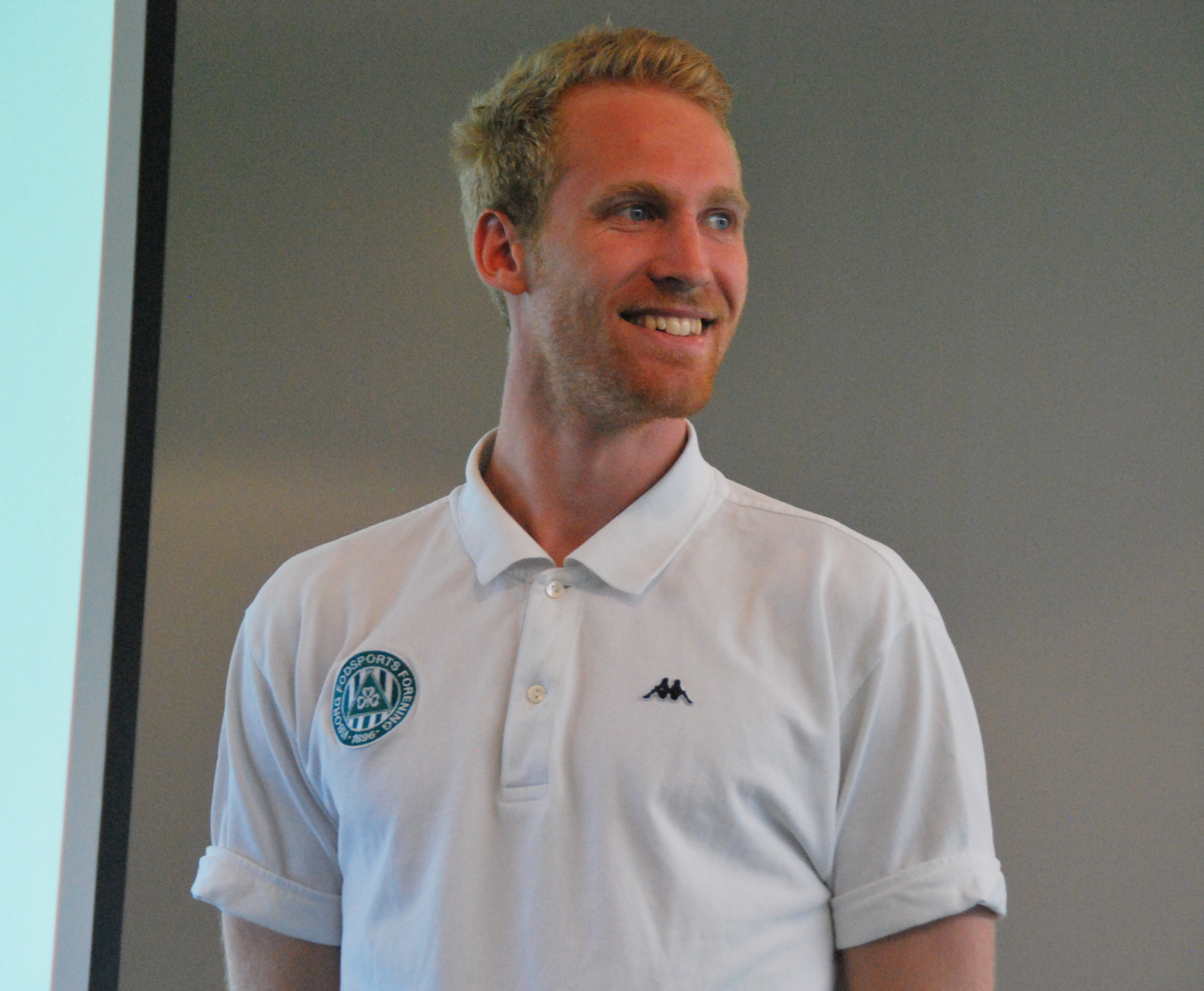
- Thorsen in 2012

Personal information
- Full name: Jonas Søndberg Thorsen
- Date of birth: 19 April 1990 (age 36)
- Place of birth: Skæring, Denmark
- Height: 1.85 m (6 ft 1 in)
- Position: Right-back

Team information
- Current team: Aarhus Fremad
- Number: 24

Youth career
- Hjortshøj-Egaa IF
- AGF

Senior career*
Years	Team	Apps	(Gls)
2008–2009	AGF	0	(0)
2009–2017	Viborg	195	(1)
2017–2018	Horsens	35	(6)
2018–2019	Eintracht Braunschweig	14	(1)
2019–2022	Horsens	59	(4)
2022–2023	Viborg	3	(0)
2023–2024	SønderjyskE	29	(0)
2024–	Aarhus Fremad	15	(0)

International career
2008–2009	Denmark U19	4	(1)
2009	Denmark U20	3	(0)
- * Club domestic league appearances and goals as of 2 June 2026

Jonas Søndberg Thorsen (born 19 April 1990) is a Danish professional footballer who plays as a right-back for Danish 1st Division club Aarhus Fremad.

== Club career ==
=== AGF ===
In 2008, he was on trial with Austrian powerhouse Red Bull Salzburg, where the later head-coach of Viborg FF, Lars Søndergaard, was leading the club's talents. Thorsen signed with Viborg FF in August 2009 after spending a season partly with AGF reserves, and since January 2009 on a professional contract.

=== Viborg FF ===
At the age of 19, Thorsen signed with Viborg FF on 31 August 2009. He left the club after eight years in the summer 2017.

=== AC Horsens ===
On 21 June 2017, Thorsen signed for AC Horsens on a free transfer.

In July 2019, he returned to AC Horsens after one year in Germany with Eintracht Braunschweig. In late 2020, Thorsen underwent surgery for testicular cancer and was subsequently declared healthy. However, the cancer returned in July 2021, after which he started chemotherapy again. For this reason, Thorsen did not play much in the 2021–22 season, just as he left the club after the season when his contract expired.

=== Return to Viborg ===
On 12 July 2022, after training with the team for a couple of days, it was confirmed, that Thorsen had signed a one-year deal with his former club Viborg FF.

=== SønderjyskE ===
On transfer deadline day, 31 January 2023, Thorsen joined Danish 1st Division club SønderjyskE on a deal for the rest of the season. On 1 May 2024 Thorsen confirmed that he would not extend his contract at the club and would therefore leave SønderjyskE after the season.

=== Aarhus Fremad ===
On 13 September 2024 it was confirmed that Thorsen had signed with Danish 2nd Division club Aarhus Fremad. Already two days later, on 15 September 2024 he made his debut in a match against Thisted FC.
