= Julius Eskesen =

Danish footballer (born 1999)

- Eskesen with Dundee United in 2026

Personal information
- Date of birth: 16 March 1999 (age 27)
- Place of birth: Odense, Denmark
- Height: 1.75 m (5 ft 9 in)
- Position: Midfielder

Team information
- Current team: KuPS
- Number: 34

Youth career
- 2004–2010: B1913
- 2010–2017: OB

Senior career*
Years	Team	Apps	(Gls)
2017–2020	OB	35	(0)
2020–2022	SønderjyskE	55	(0)
2022–2025	Haugesund	85	(8)
2025–2026	Dundee United	14	(1)
2026–	→ KuPS (loan)	10	(0)

International career
2014–2015	Denmark U16	8	(1)
2015	Denmark U17	5	(0)
2016–2017	Denmark U18	4	(0)
2017–2018	Denmark U19	5	(0)
- * Club domestic league appearances and goals as of 12 November 2026

Julius Eskesen (born 16 March 1999) is a Danish professional footballer who plays as a midfielder for Veikkausliiga club Kuopion Palloseura.

== Youth career ==
Eskesen joined OB at the age of ten from B1913 in Odense. On his fifteenth birthday, Eskesen signed his first contract with OB. In 2016, Eskesen suffered from an injury, and was operated on for it. Already at the age of 17, had he been on a trial at Spanish club Málaga CF.

== Club career ==
=== OB ===
Already at the age of 17, Eskesen was invited to his first team training camp in Spain. On 20 June 2017, Eskesen signed his first professional contract. The contract, which was valid until the summer 2021, also secured him a promotion to the first team squad.

Eskesen debuted as OB on 29 August 2017. He started on the bench, but replaced Nana Welbeck in the 65th minute and scored the winning goal in a 1–0 victory against Dalum IF in the Danish Cup.

=== SønderjyskE ===
On 28 January 2020, Eskesen joined SønderjyskE on a deal until the summer 2024. He made 67 official appearances and scored two goals for SønderjyskE during his time at the club.

=== Haugesund ===
On 31 March 2022, Eskesen moved to Norway, where he signed a four-year deal with Haugesund. He made his debut for Haugesund on 18 April 2022 against Strømsgodset.

=== Dundee United ===
On 12 August 2025, Eskesen completed a move to Scottish club Dundee United, signing a two-year-deal. Eskesen scored his first goal for the club on 14 February 2026, netting the winner in a 2–3 victory at Falkirk.

=== KuPS ===
On 25 August 2026, Eskesen joined Finnish Veikkausliiga club Kuopion Palloseura on loan, with an obligation to make the transfer permanent in January.

== Honours ==
SønderjyskE

- Danish Cup: 2019–20
