= Victor Mpindi =

Cameroonian footballer

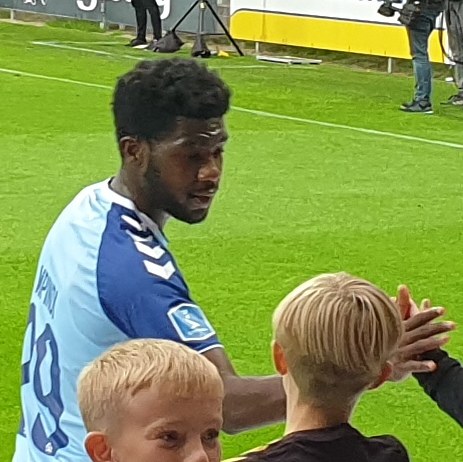

Personal information
- Full name: Victor Sylvestre Mpindi Ekani
- Date of birth: 27 February 1997 (age 29)
- Place of birth: Cameroon
- Height: 1.90 m (6 ft 3 in)
- Position: Midfielder

Youth career
- AS Fortuna Mfou

Senior career*
Years	Team	Apps	(Gls)
2017–2022	SønderjyskE	88	(2)
2022	→ Örebro (loan)	13	(1)
2022–2025	Vendsyssel	39	(1)
- * Club domestic league appearances and goals as of 5 December 2024

Victor Sylvestre Mpindi Ekani (born 27 February 1997) is a Cameroonian.

== Honours ==
SønderjyskE

- Danish Cup: 2019–20
