= Rasmus Vinderslev =

Danish footballer (born 1997)

Personal information
- Full name: Rasmus Hjorth Vinderslev
- Date of birth: 12 August 1997 (age 29)
- Place of birth: Aalborg, Denmark
- Height: 1.85 m (6 ft 1 in)
- Position: Midfielder

Team information
- Current team: Sønderjyske
- Number: 6

Youth career
- Haderslev FK
- Sønderjyske

Senior career*
Years	Team	Apps	(Gls)
2017–	Sønderjyske	193	(1)
2019	→ Vendsyssel FF (loan)	15	(0)
- * Club domestic league appearances and goals as of 19 May 2026

Rasmus Hjorth Vinderslev (born 12 August 1997) is a Danish professional footballer who plays for and captains Danish Superliga club Sønderjyske.

== Career ==
Vinderslev was born in Aalborg, where he lived until he was six years old. The family then moved to Haderslev, where as a six-year-old he was registered with Haderslev FK. As a U17 player, Vinderslev had a hard time getting on the first team for each game, so he often played with the club's second-best team. These problems continued while he was a U19 player, and it was not until the last six months as a youth player in the spring 2016, that he seriously prayed as firmly as one of the leading players in the squad.

After the summer 2016, the club didn't consider him as part of the first team plans and he was instead offered a 1-year contract where he would continue playing for the U19's. He had a good half year with the U19's which gained him a place in the first team squad training camp in Spain in January 2017.

In the beginning of May 2017, Vinderslev signed his first professional contract with Sønderjyske until the summer 2018 and was permanently promoted into the first team from the summer 2018. On 21 May 2017, Vinderslev finally got his first team debut in the Danish Superliga. He started on the bench, but replaced Marcel Rømer in the 90th minute in a 3–0 victory against Brøndby.

In January 2018, he extended his contract with further 3 years. On 31 July 2019 it was confirmed, that Vinderslev had been loaned out to Danish 1st Division club Vendsyssel for the rest of 2019 and also had extended his contract with SønderjyskE until June 2023.

== Honours ==
Sønderjyske

- Danish Cup: 2019–20
