= Nicolai Flø =

Danish footballer (born 1995)

Personal information
- Full name: Nicolai Flø Jepsen
- Date of birth: 25 September 1995 (age 31)
- Place of birth: Ry, Denmark
- Height: 1.90 m (6 ft 3 in)
- Position: Goalkeeper

Team information
- Current team: Sønderjyske
- Number: 1

Youth career
- 2006–2014: Silkeborg

Senior career*
| Years | Team | Apps | (Gls) |
| 2014–2016 | Silkeborg | 0 | (0) |
| 2016–2020 | Vendsyssel | 77 | (0) |
| 2020– | Sønderjyske | 85 | (0) |
- * Club domestic league appearances and goals as of 19 May 2026

Nicolai Flø Jepsen (Danish pronunciation: [ˈne̝koˌlɑjˀ ˈfløˀ ˈjepsn̩]; born 25 September 1995) is a Danish professional footballer who plays as a goalkeeper for Sønderjyske.

== Club career ==
=== Silkeborg IF ===
After having played youth football for Silkeborg IF, Flø was promoted to the first team on 23 May 2014, where he signed a professional contract. He signed a two-year contract. On 1 June 2016, after spending two years as a backup behind first goalkeeper, Thomas Nørgaard, it was announced that he would leave the club on a free transfer.

=== Vendsyssel FF ===
On 12 June 2016, Flø joined Vendsyssel FF on a two-year deal. Flø made his professional first-team debut on 24 July 2016, starting in a 1–0 home defeat against HB Køge. Afterwards, he stated that he wanted to play as a starter, and that he regarded the competition with fellow Vendsyssel-goalkeeper, Simon Enevoldsen as "healthy".

On 20 February 2018, Flø signed a new contract with Vendsyssel, keeping him at the club until 2020. At the end of the 2017-18 season, Flø and Vendsyssel FF reached promotion to the Danish Superliga after reaching third place during regular season and beating Lyngby Boldklub over two matches in a direct battle for a spot in the Superliga. On 27 May 2018, in the second and final match against Lyngby, Flø saved a penalty by Herolind Shala in a match that ended in a 3–1 win for Vendsyssel. Thereby, Vendsyssel FF secured promotion to the Superliga for the first time in the history of the club.

=== Sønderjyske ===
On 13 August 2020, Flø moved to Sønderjyske on a free transfer, signing a two-year deal. On 9 December 2025, Flø extended his contract with Sønderjyske until 30 June 2029.
