= Rune Frantsen =

Danish footballer (born 1991)

Personal information
- Date of birth: 15 October 1991 (age 35)
- Place of birth: Denmark
- Height: 1.84 m (6 ft 0 in)
- Position: Full-back

Senior career*
Years	Team	Apps	(Gls)
2011–2018	Vendsyssel	151	(10)
2018–2021	Horsens	87	(3)
2021–2024	Vendsyssel	74	(0)
- * Club domestic league appearances and goals as of 17 April 2024

Rune Frantsen (born 15 October 1991) is a Danish retired professional footballer who played as a full-back.
