= Haderslev Football Stadium =

Football stadium in Haderslev, Denmark

Haderslev Football Stadium Sydbank Park
- Naming rights agreement since December 2013

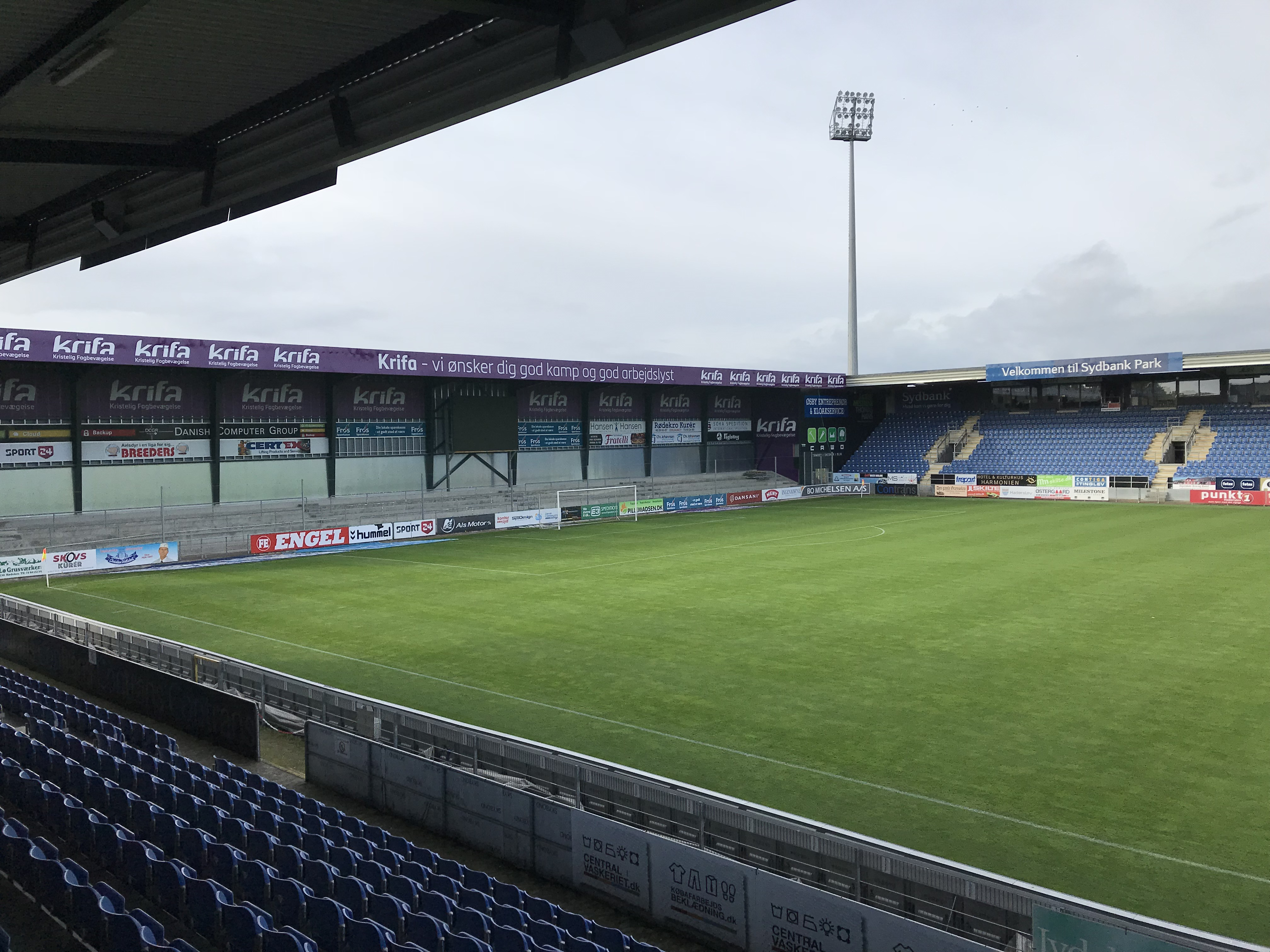
- The south end of the stadium in September 2018
- Interactive map of Haderslev Football Stadium; Sydbank Park
- Full name: Sydbank Park
- Former names: Haderslev Fodboldstadion (2001–present); Sydbank Park (2013–present)
- Location: Stadionvej 7 DK-6100 Haderslev
- Coordinates: 55°15′41″N 9°29′16″E
- Owner: Haderslev Kommune and HFK Tribune
- Capacity: 10,100 (5,100 seatings)
- Surface: Natural grass
- Field size: 105 by 68 metres (114.8 yd × 74.4 yd)

Construction
- Groundbreaking: 2001
- Built: 2001
- Opened: 2001
- Renovated: 2013-2014, 2018-2019
- Cost: DKK 79 million (2013-2014)
- Architect: P+P arkitekter (2013-2014)

Tenants
- Sønderjyske Fodbold; Sønderjyske Kvindefodbold (–2009)

Haderslev Football Stadium (Danish: Haderslev Fodboldstadion, pronounced [ˈhæðˀɐˌsle̝w ˈfoðpʌltˌstɛˀtjʌn]) is an association football stadium located in Haderslev, Denmark. It is the home ground of SønderjyskE. It has been known as Sydbank Park due to a sponsorship arrangement with the Danish bank Sydbank since December 2013. It was built in 2001 and has a capacity of 10,100 with 5,100 seatings. It has been renovated in 2013 by building a new stand of about 3.000 seats to respect the criteria of the Danish Superliga, and again in 2018 and 2019 by expanding the eastern stands, and upgrading the north and south stands with roofs.

The south stand is a standing-only area for away fans. The north stand is a standing-only area for the singing home fans and the official supporters club. The east and west stands are seating only. The official supporters have a club house beneath the east stand. The stadium has four sky boxes in the west stand, and one sponsor lounge in the east stand. Two LED screens are able to show instant highlights, times and results.
