= 2019–20 Danish Cup =

DBU Pokalen (The DBU Cup)
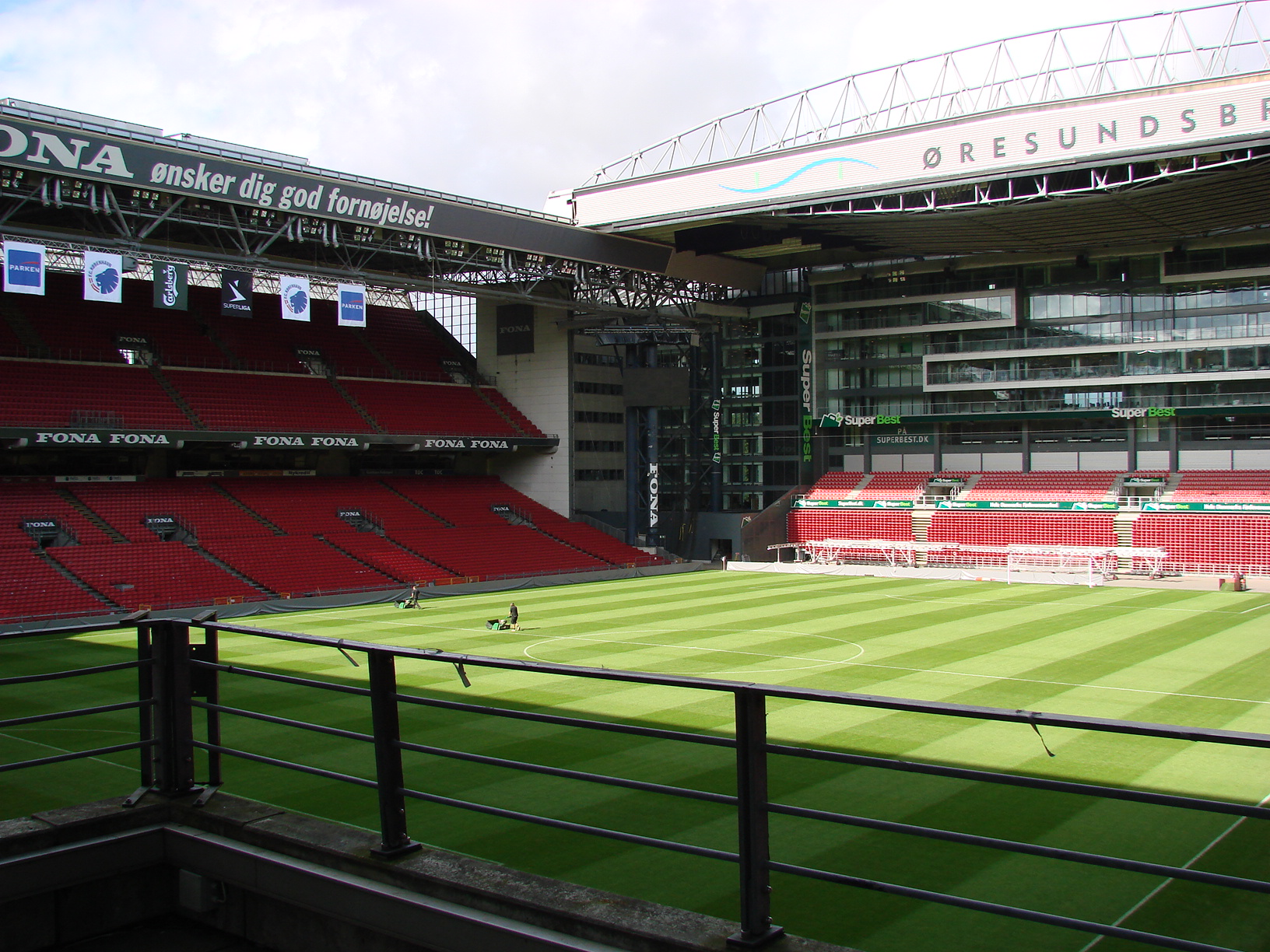
- Parken Stadium hosted the final

Tournament details
- Country: Denmark
- Teams: 102

Final positions
- Champions: SønderjyskE (1st title)
- Runners-up: AaB
- UEFA Europa League: SønderjyskE

The 2019–20 Danish Cup, also known as Sydbank Pokalen, was the 66th season of the Danish Cup competition. The winners of the tournament, SønderjyskE, in winning their first major championship in club history, earned qualification into the second qualifying round of the 2020–21 UEFA Europa League.

== Structure ==
In the first round, there 88 teams participated, coming from all levels of competition. Eight additional teams joined in round two and the top six teams from the 2018-19 Danish Superliga entered the 3rd round.

== Notable Dates ==
The draw date and matchdays for the 2019–20 Sydbank Pokalen were as follows:
First Round Draw – July 2, 2019
First Round – August 6–8, 2019
Second Round Draw – August 15, 2019
Second Round – September 3–5, 2019
Third Round – September 24–26, 2019
Fourth Round – October 29–31, 2019
Quarterfinals – March 3–5, 2020
Semifinals – April 22–23, 2020
Final – May 21, 2020

== Participants ==
102 teams will compete for the Danish Cup. All teams from the top three divisions in 2018–19 were automatically entered while lower division teams played qualifying matches to enter the competition.

== First round ==
In the first round of the tournament the teams were divided into a West and East pool. In the West Pool, 46 teams participated, divided into two groups, "Funen / Southern Jutland" and " Middle / North Jutland". The East Pool consisted of 42 teams and was divided into the "Zealand 1" and "Zealand 2" groups.

The draw was held on Friday, 2 July 2019.

=== Middle / North Jutland ===
| 6 August 2019 | Jammerbugt FC (3) | 1–2 | Viborg FF (2) | Jetsmark Stadion, Pandrup |
| 18:30 |

| 6 August 2019 | Vildbjerg GF (5) | 2–3 | Vejgaard BK (3) | Vildbjerg Sportscenter, Vildbjerg |
| 18:00 |

| 6 August 2019 | Nørresundby FB (4) | 2–1 | Lyseng (4) | Nordjyske Bank Arena, Nørresundby |
| 18:00 |

| 6 August 2019 | Aarhus Fremad (4) | 2–3 | Brabrand IF (3) | Riisvangen Stadion, Aarhus |
| 18:00 |

| 6 August 2019 | Fuglebakken KFUM (5) | 3–1 | Vatanspor (4) | Højlyngen, Aarhus |
| 18:00 |

| 7 August 2019 | Ringkøbing IF (4) | 0–1 | VSK Aarhus (4) | Green Arena, Ringkøbing |
| 18:00 |

| 7 August 2019 | Holstebro Boldklub (4) | 3–0 | Odder IGF (3) | Holstebro Idrætspark, Holstebro |
| 18:00 |

| 7 August 2019 | Dronninglund (5) | 0–3 | FC Djursland (4) | Dronninglund Ny Stadion, Dronninglund |
| 18:00 |

| 8 August 2019 | Skagen IK (4) | 0–8 | Thisted FC (3) | Sparekassen Vendsyssel Arena, Skagen |
| 18:00 |

| 8 August 2019 | Lystrup IF (4) | 1–16 | Skive IK (2) | Lystrup Enge Idrætsanlæg, Lystrup |
| 18:00 |

| 13 August 2019 | Fårvang IF (7) | 2–3 | Viby IF (4) | Fårvang Stadion, Fårvang |
| 19:00 |

| 28 August 2019 | Kjellerup IF (3) | 0–9 | Vendsyssel FF (2) | Bjergets Idrætsanlæg, Kjellerup |
| 17:30p |

=== Funen / South Jutland ===
| 6 August 2019 | Marstal/Rise (5) | 5–3 (a.e.t.) | Kolding B (3) | Marstal Stadion, Marstal |
| 18:00 |

| 6 August 2019 | Flemløse/Haarby (4) | 1–2 | Otterup B&IK (5) | Haarby Stadion, Haarby |
| 18:00 |

| 6 August 2019 | SfB-Oure FA (5) | 0–1 | Middelfart G&BK (3) | Høje Bøge Stadion, Svendborg |
| 18:00 |

| 6 August 2019 | BK Marienlyst (3) | 3–1 | Hedensted IF (4) | Marienlystcentret, Odense |
| 18:00 |

| 6 August 2019 | BK Chang (5) | 1–1 (a.e.t.) (2–3 p) | FC Sønderborg (4) | Chang's Baner, Aalborg |
| 18:00 |

| 6 August 2019 | Sædding/Guldager (4) | 1–6 | Tarup-Paarup IF (3) | Guldager Idrætscenter, Esbjerg |
| 18:00 |

| 7 August 2019 | Dalum IF (3) | 0–3 | Kolding IF (3) | Dalum Stadion, Odense |
| 18:00 |

| 7 August 2019 | Hatting/Torsted (5) | 0–5 | FC Fredericia (2) | Torsted Stadion, Horsens |
| 18:00 |

| 7 August 2019 | OKS (5) | 1–2 | FC Sydvest 05 (3) | OKSon-Park, Odense |
| 18:00 |

| 8 August 2019 | Allesø GF (5) | 0–6 | Vejle Boldklub (2) | Spurvelund Skolen, Odense |
| 18:00 |

| 8 August 2019 | Krarup/Espe (5) | 2–3 | Varde IF (3) | Espehallen, Ringe |
| 18:00 |

=== Zealand 1 ===
| 6 August 2019 | FC Sunshine (4) | 0–3 | BK Frem (3) | Kløvermarken Idrætsanlæg (Sundby Field), København |
| 18:00 |

| 6 August 2019 | FC Helsingør (3) | 0–2 | AB (3) | Gladsaxe Stadion, Søborg |
| 18:45 |

| 6 August 2019 | Union (4) | 1–0 | B.93 (3) | Genforeningspladsen, København |
| 18:00 |

| 6 August 2019 | Jægersborg BK (6) | 1–2 | HIK (3) | Jægersborg Stadion, Gentofte |
| 18:00 |

| 7 August 2019 | FC Rudersdal (4) | 0–5 | Hillerød (3) | Vedbæk Stadion, Vedbæk |
| 18:00 |

| 7 August 2019 | BK Skjold (3) | 0–1 | Fremad Amager (2) | Østerbro Stadion, København |
| 18:00 |

| 7 August 2019 | Frederiksberg BK (5) | 3–2 (a.e.t.) | KFUM (5) | Frederiksberg Idrætspark, Frederiksberg |
| 18:00 |

| 7 August 2019 | Rønne IK (5) | 0–2 | B.1908 (5) | Rønne Stadion Nord, Rønne |
| 18:00 |

| 8 August 2019 | BK Avarta (3) | 4–2 | Skovshoved IF (3) | Espelundens Idrætsanlæg, Rødovre |
| 18:00 |

| 13 August 2019 | IF Skjold Birkerød (4) | 1–4 | Vanløse IF (3) | Birkerød Sadion, Birkerød |
| 18:00 |

| 14 August 2019 | BK Viktoria (4) | 3–1 | Hundested IK (3) | Fælledparken Kunst, København |
| 19:00 |

| 28 August 2019 | Brønshøj BK (3) | 1–2 (a.e.t.) | Hvidovre IF (2) | Tingbjerg Idrætspark, København |
| 19:00 |

=== Zealand 2 ===
| 6 August 2019 | FC 77 Næstved (5) | 0–8 | Ledøje-Smørum Fodbold (4) | Dyrskuepladsen (Animal ground), Næstved |
| 18:00 |

| 6 August 2019 | Eskilstrup BK (5) | 0–12 | KFUM Roskilde (5) | Eskilstrup Stadion, Eskilstrup |
| 18:00 |

| 6 August 2019 | Herlev IF (3) | 4–1 | Karlslunde IF (5) | Herlev Stadion, Herlev |
| 18:00 |

| 6 August 2019 | Herstedøster IC (5) | 1–0 | Taastrup FC (4) | Herstedøster Stadion, Albertslund |
| 18:00 |

| 7 August 2019 | Holbæk B&I (3) | 1–2 | Nykøbing FC (2) | Holbæk Sportsby, Holbæk |
| 18:00 |

| 7 August 2019 | Avedøre IF (5) | 0–1 | Slagelse B&I (3) | Avedøre Stadion, Hvidovre |
| 18:00 |

| 8 August 2019 | Nordfalster BK (4) | 1–7 | FC Roskilde (2) | Kvickly Park, Gyldenbjerg |
| 18:00 |

| 8 August 2019 | Vordingborg IF (4) | 1–3 | Næstved BK (2) | Vordingborg Stadion, Vordingborg |
| 18:00 |

| 13 August 2019 | Toreby-Grænge BK (5) | 0–9 | HB Køge (2) | TGB's Anlæg, Toreby |
| 19:00 |

== Second round ==
The draw was held on 15 August 2019.

There were

- 44 teams from the 1st round (winners)
- 4 teams from the 1st division (1st–4th placed)
- 8 teams from the Superliga (5th–12th placed)

| 3 September 2019 | Otterup B&IK (4) | 4–0 | FC Sydvest 05 (3) | Nordfyns Bank Arena, Otterup |
| 17:15 |

| 3 September 2019 | Vejgaard BK (3) | 2–1 | Hobro IK (1) | Soffy Road, Aalborg |
| 17:15 |

| 3 September 2019 | FC Djursland (4) | 1–4 | VSK Aarhus (3) | HSM Arena Grenå, Grenaa |
| 17:15 |

| 3 September 2019 | Fuglebakken KFUM (5) | 0–3 | Viby IF (4) | Højlyngen, Aarhus |
| 17:15 |

| 3 September 2019 | Hillerød Fodbold (3) | 1–0 | Næstved BK (2) | Hillerød Stadion, Hillerød |
| 17:15 |

| 3 September 2019 | Herstedøster IC (5) | 4–7 | Hellerup IK (3) | Herstedøster Stadion, Albertslund |
| 17:15 |

| 3 September 2019 | Ledøje-Smørum Fodbold (4) | 1–4 | Nykøbing FC (2) | Smørum Idrætscenter, Smørum |
| 17:15 |

| 3 September 2019 | KFUM Roskilde (4) | 1–3 | HB Køge (2) | Lillevang Idrætscenter, Roskilde |
| 17:15 |

| 3 September 2019 | Tarup-Paarup IF (4) | 0–3 | FC Roskilde (2) | Home Tarup Park, Odense |
| 17:15 |

| 3 September 2019 | Frederiksbergs Boldklub (5) | 2–3 | Vanløse IF (3) | Frederiksberg Idrætspark, Frederiksberg |
| 19:00 |

| 3 September 2019 | Boldklubben Marienlyst (4) | 2–1 | Holstebro Boldklub (4) | Marienlystcentret, Odense |
| 19:00 |

| 4 September 2019 | Herlev IF (4) | 1–3 | Silkeborg IF (1) | Herlev Stadion, Herlev |
| 17:15 |

| 4 September 2019 | Boldklubben Avarta (3) | 2–1 | Boldklubben Frem (3) | Espelundens Idrætsanlæg, København |
| 17:15 |

| 4 September 2019 | Brabrand IF (3) | 1–4 | FC Fredericia (2) | Brabrand IF's Idrætsanlæg, Brabrand |
| 17:15 |

| 4 September 2019 | Boldklubben Union (4) | 0–2 | AC Horsens | Genforeningspladsen, København |
| 18:15 |

| 4 September 2019 | Slagelse B&I (3) | 1–2 | Akademisk Boldklub (3) | Harboe Arena Slagelse, Slagelse |
| 19:00 |

| 4 September 2019 | Kolding IF (2) | 0–4 | Randers FC (1) | Autocentralen Park, Kolding |
| 19:00 |

| 5 September 2019 | Boldklubben Viktoria (6) | 0–5 | SønderjyskE (1) | Fælledparken, København |
| 18:15 |

| 10 September 2019 | Middelfart G&BK (3) | 0–2 | Skive IK (2) | Middelfart Stadium, Middelfart |
| 17:00 |

| 10 September 2019 | Varde IF (4) | 3–4 | Thisted FC (3) | Sydbank Stadion, Varde |
| 17:15 |

| 10 September 2019 | B1908 (4) | 2–5 | Hvidovre IF (2) | Sundby Idrætspark, København |
| 18:15 |

| 10 September 2019 | FC Sønderborg (6) | 0–4 | Viborg FF (2) | Sønderborg Stadion, Sønderborg |
| 18:30 |

| 10 September 2019 | Vendsyssel FF (2) | 1–0 | Vejle BK (2) | Nord Energi Arena, Hjørring |
| 19:00 |

| 11 September 2019 | Nørresundby FB (5) | 0–8 | AaB (1) | Lindholm Høje Stadion, Nørresundby |
| 17:15 |

| 11 September 2019 | Marstal IF (5) | 2–6 | AGF (1) | Marstal Stadion, Marstal |
| 17:15 |

| 11 September 2019 | Fremad Amager (2) | 1–1 (a.e.t.) (5–4 p) | Lyngby BK (1) | Sundby Idrætspark, København |
| 20:00 |

== Third round ==
The draw was held on 12 September 2019.

There were

- 28 teams from the 2nd round (winners)
- 4 teams from the 3F Superliga (1st–4th placed)

| 24 September 2019 | Otterup B&IK (4) | 0–2 | OB (1) | Nordfyns Bank Arena, Otterup |
| 16:30 |

| 25 September 2019 | BK Avarta (3) | 2–4 | FC Fredericia (2) | Espelundens Idrætsanlæg, Rødovre |
| 16:30 |

| 25 September 2019 | Vejgaard BK (3) | 0–6 | AaB (1) | Soffy Road, Aalborg |
| 16:30 |

| 25 September 2019 | Hillerød Fodbold (3) | 1–1 (a.e.t.) (2–4 p) | F.C. København (1) | Hillerød Stadion, Hillerød |
| 16:30 | | FCK Summary | | Attendance: 3.247; Referee: Anders Poulsen |

| 25 September 2019 | Boldklubben Marienlyst (4) | 2–5 | Esbjerg fB (1) | Marienlystcentret, Odense |
| 18:00 |

| 25 September 2019 | Akademisk Boldklub (3) | 3–1 (a.e.t.) | Viborg FF (2) | Gladsaxe Stadium, Søborg |
| 18:00 |

| 25 September 2019 | Hvidovre IF (2) | 2–4 | SønderjyskE (1) | Hvidovre Stadium, Hvidovre |
| 18:30 |

| 25 September 2019 | HB Køge (2) | 1–0 | Nykøbing FC (2) | Capelli Sport Stadion, Køge |
| 19:00 |

| 25 September 2019 | Skive IK (2) | 2–3 (a.e.t.) | Brøndby IF (1) | Hancock Arena, Skive |
| 19:30 |

| 26 September 2019 | VSK Aarhus (3) | 1–3 | AGF (1) | Vejlby-Risskov Idrætscenter, Aarhus |
| 16:30 |

| 26 September 2019 | FC Roskilde (2) | 1–2 | Randers FC (1) | Roskilde Idrætspark, Roskilde |
| 18:00 |

| 26 September 2019 | Fremad Amager (2) | 1–0 | FC Midtjylland (1) | Sundby Idrætspark, København |
| 19:15 |

| 1 October 2019 | Viby IF (4) | 1–0 | Vanløse IF (3) | Viby Idrætspark, Viby J |
| 16:00 |

| 2 October 2019 | HIK (3) | 0–1 | Silkeborg IF (1) | Gentofte Sportspark, Gentofte |
| 18:30 |

| 3 October 2019 | Thisted FC (3) | 1–2 | AC Horsens (1) | Sparekassen Thy Arena, Thisted |
| 18:30 |

| 9 October 2019 | Vendsyssel FF (2) | 0–2 | FC Nordsjælland (1) | Nord Energi Arena, Hjørring |
| 19:00 |

== Fourth round ==
The draw was held after the match Fremad Amager-FC Midtjylland, 26 September 2019.

There were 16 winners from the previous round.

| 11 October 2019 | FC Fredericia (2) | 3–4 (a.e.t.) | Silkeborg IF (1) | Monjasa Park, Fredericia |
| 18:30 | Holvad 7', 23' Ritter 90+2' | | Lesniak 42' Schwartz 61', 103' Heimer 90+3' | Attendance: 948 |

| 30 October 2019 | Brøndby IF (1) | 0–1 | SønderjyskE (1) | Brøndby Stadion, Brøndby |
| 18:00 (20:00 postponed) | | | Lieder 84' | Attendance: 6,582 |

| 30 October 2019 | Viby IF (4) | 0–2 | Randers FC (1) | Cepheus Park Randers, Randers |
| 19:00 | Mattias Pedersèn (yellow card) 70' (yellow-red card) 89' | | Riis Jakobsen 66' Jørgensen 85' (o.g.) Kamara (red card) 70' | Attendance: 1,649 |

| 31 October 2019 | F.C. København (1) | 4–1 | FC Nordsjælland (1) | Telia Parken, København |
| 17:30 | Bendtner 24' Daramy 66', 75' Sotiriou 66' | FCK Summary | Rasmussen 2' | Attendance: 9,238 |

| 31 October 2019 | AGF (1) | 1–0 | OB (1) | Ceres Park, Aarhus |
| 20:15 | Ankersen 86' | | | Attendance: 3,160 |

| 6 November 2019 | Fremad Amager (2) | 0–3 | AC Horsens (1) | Sundby Idrætspark, København |
| 18:00 | | | Ludwig 39' Andreasen 58' Therkildsen 74' | Attendance: 2,019 |

| 6 November 2019 | AB (3) | 1–2 | Esbjerg fB (1) | Gladsaxe Stadium, Søborg |
| 18:00 | Rohde 37' | | Yuriy Yakovenko 89' Sørensen 90' |

| 27 November 2019 | HB Køge (2) | 0–3 | AaB (1) | Capelli Sport Stadion, Køge |
| 18:00 | | | Abildgaard 24' Fossum 59' van Weert 86' |

== Quarter-finals ==
| 3 March 2020 Quarterfinals | Esbjerg fB (1) | 1–4 | AGF (1) | Blue Water Arena, Esbjerg |
| 18:30 | Erceg (yellow card) 32'; Kauko 58' | AGF Report | Bundu 11' 28'; Blume 63' 87'; Amini (yellow card) 72' | Attendance: 3,134; Referee: Mads-Kristoffer Kristoffersen |

| 4 March 2020 Quarterfinals | AaB (1) | 2–0 | F.C. København (1) | Nordjyske Arena, Aalborg |
| 18:30 | Thelander (yellow card) 15'; Olsen (yellow card) 23'; Ross 43' (Olsen); Klitten 49' (Kusk); Fossum (yellow card) 71'; Ahlmann (yellow card) 78' | FCK Highlights | Santos (yellow card) 18'; Bartolec (yellow card) 75' | Attendance: 7,739; Referee: Jens Maae |

| 5 March 2020 Quarterfinals | Randers FC (1) | 1–2 | SønderjyskE (1) | Cepheus Park Randers, Randers |
| 17:45 | Greve 5'; Lauenborg (yellow card) 40'; Kehinde (yellow card) 70' | Horsens Highlights | Bah (yellow card) 44'; Jacobsen 67'; Ólafsson (yellow card) 82'; Frederiksen 89' (yellow card) 90+5' | Attendance: 1,919; Referee: Peter Kjærsgaard-Andersen |

| 5 March 2020 Quarterfinals | AC Horsens (1) | 1–1 (a.e.t.) (8–7 p) | Silkeborg IF (1) | CASA Arena Horsens, Horsens |
| 20:00 | Frantsen 22' (Hanson); Okosun (yellow card) 88'; Thorsen (yellow card) 90+2'; Andreasen (yellow card) 103' | | Ibsen (yellow card) 65'; Madsen 71' (Crone); Lesniak (yellow card) 73'; Brumado (yellow card) 85'; Vallys (yellow card) 120' | Attendance: Horsens; Referee: Jakob Kehlet |
| | Penalties |
| | Andreasean (penalty missed); Okosun (penalty scored); Jeppe Kjær (penalty scored); Drost (penalty scored); Mašović (penalty scored); Jacobsen (penalty scored); Thorsen (penalty scored); Ludwig (penalty scored); Therkildsen (penalty scored) | | Holten (penalty scored); Lind (penalty missed); Gertsen (penalty scored); Hagelskjær (penalty scored); Madsen (penalty scored); Carstensen (penalty scored); Vallys (penalty scored); Møller (penalty scored); Lesniak (penalty missed) |

== Semi-finals ==
| 10 June 2020 Semi-finals | SønderjyskE (1) | 2–1 | AC Horsens (1) | Sydbank Park, Haderslev |
| 18:00 | Ekani (yellow card) 51'; Eskesen 63' (Bah); Jónsson (yellow card) 81'; Jacobsen 89' | AC Horsens Report | Okosun 53' (Prip) | Attendance: 0 Referee: Jakob Kehlet |

| 10 June 2020 Semi-finals | AaB (1) | 3–2 | AGF (1) | Aalborg Portland Park |
| 20:45 | Fossum 35' (van Weert) 54'; Andersen 50' (Pallesen); Ross (yellow card) 90+3'; Olsen (yellow card) 90+6' | AaB Report | Blume 77' (Hvidt); Helenius 90' (Þorsteinsson); Backman (yellow card) 90+3'; Þorsteinsson (yellow card) 90+3' | Attendance: 280; Referee: Sandi Putros |

== Final ==
1 July 2020
20:00

| SønderjyskE (1) | 2–0 | AaB (1) |
|---|---|---|
| Eskesen (yellow card) 23' (yellow-red card) 65'; Jónsson (yellow card) 32'; Jacobsen 38', 56'; Bah (yellow card) 46'; Jakobsen (yellow card) 49'; Banggaard (yellow card) 75' | Report | Okore (yellow card) 13'; Christensen (yellow card) 21'; Ross (yellow card) 71' |

Blue Water Arena, Esbjerg
Attendance: 1,750
Referee: Jørgen Daugbjerg Burchardt
