= Sønderjyske Fodbold =

Danish association football club based in Haderslev

Sønderjyske
- Full name: Sønderjyske Fodbold
- Short name: SE, SJF, Sønderjyske
- Founded: 1 January 2004; 22 years ago
- Ground: Sydbank Park, Haderslev
- Capacity: 10,000 (5,100 seated)
- Owner(s): Davidsen Family & MKH Fodbold A/S
- Chairman: Søren Davidsen
- Head coach: vacant
- League: Superliga
- 2025–26: Superliga, 6th of 12
- Website: soenderjyskefodbold.dk
Home colours	Away colours

Sønderjyske Fodbold is a professional football club. The club plays in the Danish Superliga, the top tier of the Danish football league system. Their home is Sydbank Park in Haderslev.

They are part of the general sports club SønderjyskE, which also has a handball and ice hockey team.

== History ==
=== Club names ===
- Haderslev FK (14 July 1906 – 31 December 2000)
- HFK Sønderjylland ("Southern Jutland", 1 January 2001 – 31 December 2003)
- SønderjyskE Fodbold ("Southern Jutlandic Football", 1 January 2004 – 14 October 2022, under Sønderjysk Elitesport A/S)
- Sønderjyske Fodbold ("Southern Jutlandic Football", 15 October 2022 – Present)

=== Progenitors ===
Haderslev Fodboldklub (Haderslev FK / HFK) was founded on 14 July 1906. At the time, Haderslev was a part of the German Empire as a part of Schleswig-Holstein. The club had both Danish and German members, and in the initial years there were disagreement over if the club should be called Haderslev Fodboldklub (in Danish) or Haderslebener Fussball Club (in German). In the first many years the team had trouble assembling a proper match squad due to lack of members. In 1908 they became South Jutland champions for the first time beating Sønderborg 11–1 in the final.

For the first many years the club did not have their own field and instead played at barracks. Their first proper football ground was built in 1930.

In 1958 HFK were promoted to the 4th division (Jyllandsserien), and in 1965 they were promoted to the 3rd Division. In 1992 they were promoted to the Danish 2nd Division and in 1996 they were promoted to the second tier, Danish 1st Division, for the first time.

In 2000 the team, which was now called HFK Sønderjylland, were promoted to the Superligaen, the first team from Southern Jutland to ever do so. They were however relegated the following season. The team also moved into a new stadium, hosting 10,000 spectators.

=== The creation of SønderjyskE ===
After teams from Sønderjylland in both football, ice hockey and handball started to have success, the company Sønderjysk Elitesport A/S was founded on 1 January 2004 to promote professional sports in Southern Jutland. It was a union of the handball club TM Tønder (who later left the initiative), HFK, the Ice Hockey club Vojens Ishockeyklub, and the women's football team IK Sønderjylland.

SønderjyskE was promoted to the Superligaen again in 2005, but once again it would only be for a single season.

In 2008 they returned to the Superliga, and after finishing 10th they managed to survive for the first time ever. The following three seasons they improved on their best ever league finishes with a 9th, a 7th and a 6th-place finish.

In the 2012–13 season, SønderjyskE achieved the unfortunate European record of missing 7 penalty kicks in a row.

==== Second place and qualification to Europe ====
In 2016-17 the club played continental games for the first time ever, after finishing second in the 2015-16 Danish Superliga and their coach Jakob Michelsen was named Danish coach of the year. Here they beat Norwegian Strømgodset in the Europa League qualification 2–1. It was followed up by beating Polish Zagłębie Lubin. In the last qualification match against Sparta Prague they managed a 0–0 draw at home, and went up 2–0 in the return fixture, but Sparta Prague would go on to win 3–2.

==== The Danish Cup and club sale ====
In 2020 SønderjyskE won their first ever trophy, the DBU Pokalen, when they beat AaB in the final 2–0.

In September 2020 the club was bought by the American investor Robert Michael Platek for an unknown fee.

In 2021 they reached the cup final for the second time in a row, after beating FC Midtjylland in the semi-final. They would however lose to Randers FC in the final 4–0.

The season afterwards the team was relegated to the Danish 1st Division for the first time ince 2007–08, winning just 4 matches the entire season. The new ownership faced heavy criticism for their management of the club, and in August 2022 the team was sold back to local ownership. Following the sale the club was administratively separated from the other sports teams in SønderjyskE and changed their name from SønderjyskE to Sønderjyske. They did however share some administrative coordination regarding sponsors, logo and sales.

Two seasons later the team was promoted to the Superliga again by winning the Danish 1st Division.

== Fan culture ==
The official fanclub is called SønderjyskE Fodbold Support, and was founded in 2004. The number of members is unknown. The fan section is called "Blue Section".

The supporters have often referenced their German past with banners in German such as "Deutsche Kvalitet, Dänische Mentalitet" (German quality, Danish mentality).

== Players ==
=== Current squad ===
As of 7 September 2026

Note: Flags indicate national team as defined under FIFA eligibility rules; some limited exceptions apply. Players may hold more than one non-FIFA nationality.

No.	Pos.	Nation	Player
1	GK	DEN	Nicolai Flø
3	DF	DEN	Alexander Munksgaard
5	DF	ISL	Rúnar Þór Sigurgeirsson
6	MF	DEN	Rasmus Vinderslev (captain)
7	MF	MKD	Sefer Emini
8	MF	GUI	Mohamed Cherif Haidara
9	FW	USA	Matthew Hoppe
10	MF	LUX	Mathias Olesen
11	FW	GUY	Osaze De Rosario (on loan from Seattle Sounders)
12	DF	FRA	Maxime Soulas
13	DF	NZL	Dalton Wilkins
14	FW	NOR	Teodor Berg Haltvik
15	FW	MKD	Lirim Qamili
16	GK	DEN	Marcus Bundgaard
17	MF	DEN	Anders Hoeg

No.	Pos.	Nation	Player
18	FW	DEN	Omran Khatar
19	DF	DEN	Pachanga Kristensen
20	DF	DEN	Tobias Klysner
21	DF	BUL	Stefan Velkov
22	MF	DEN	Andreas Oggesen
23	DF	NGR	Ebube Duru
24	GK	BEL	Nick Shinton
25	DF	ISL	Brynjar Ingi Bjarnason
26	FW	GAM	Bubacarr Tambedou
28	MF	DEN	Anders Bergholt
30	DF	DEN	Gustav Wagner
31	FW	FRA	Ismaïl Seydi
32	FW	GHA	David Boison
33	MF	DEN	Jacob Steen Christensen (on loan from Molde)
38	GK	TUR	Berkant Bayrak

=== Youth players in use 2026-27 ===
Note: Flags indicate national team as defined under FIFA eligibility rules; some limited exceptions apply. Players may hold more than one non-FIFA nationality.

No.	Pos.	Nation	Player
34	MF	DEN	Enis Zeqiri
36	MF	DEN	Elias Hjort-Pedersen

No.	Pos.	Nation	Player
-	MF	DEN	Lasse Mandal

=== Out on loan ===
Note: Flags indicate national team as defined under FIFA eligibility rules; some limited exceptions apply. Players may hold more than one non-FIFA nationality.

No.	Pos.	Nation	Player
29	FW	KOS	Albert Rrahmani (at Nykøbing FC until 30 June 2027)

== Honours ==
- Danish Cup
  - Winners (1): 2019–20
  - Runners-up (1): 2020–21
- Danish Superliga
  - Runners-up (1): 2015–16
- Danish 1st Division
  - Winners (2): 2004–05, 2023–24
  - Runners-up (1): 2007–08
- 14 seasons in the Highest Danish League
- 8 seasons in the Second Highest Danish League
- 5 seasons in the Third Highest Danish League

== Recent history ==
Season		Pos.	Pl.	W	D	L	GS	GA	P	Cup	Notes
2000–01	SL	12	33	1	8	24	30	88	11	Fourth round	Relegated
2001–02	1D	3	30	17	4	9	61	50	55	Fourth round	
2002–03	1D	6	30	13	8	9	64	54	47	Fourth round	
2003–04	1D	6	30	15	6	9	72	51	51	Third round	
2004–05	1D	1	30	19	7	4	75	31	64	Fifth round	Promoted
2005–06	SL	11	33	6	8	19	41	72	26	Fourth round	Relegated
2006–07	1D	3	30	16	5	9	57	34	53	Fourth round	
2007–08	1D	2	30	17	10	3	55	32	61	Fourth round	Promoted
2008–09	SL	10	33	5	13	15	30	56	28	Third round	
2009–10	SL	9	33	11	8	14	37	43	41	Quarter-finals	
2010–11	SL	7	33	11	6	16	32	46	39	Second round	
2011–12	SL	6	33	11	11	11	48	51	44	Semi-finals	
2012–13	SL	8	33	12	5	16	53	57	41	Fourth round	
2013–14	SL	10	33	10	8	15	41	53	38	Third round	
2014–15	SL	10	33	7	16	10	35	44	37	Semi-finals	
2015–16	SL	2	33	19	5	9	56	36	62	Quarter-finals	
2016–17	SL	6	36	12	10	14	44	54	46	Fourth round	
2017–18	SL	8	32	11	8	13	42	40	41	Quarter-finals	
2018–19	SL	10	32	9	8	15	37	45	35	Fourth round	
2019–20	SL	10	32	9	11	12	37	49	38	Winners	
2020–21	SL	8	32	13	5	14	45	48	44	Runners-up	
2021–22	SL	12	32	4	11	17	28	54	23	Semi-finals	Relegated
2022–23	1D	3	32	16	8	8	60	45	56	Quarter-finals	
2023–24	1D	1	32	20	8	4	71	29	68	Second round	Promoted
2024–25	SL	9	32	10	7	15	47	64	37	Fourth round	
2025–26	SL	6	32	12	8	12	44	49	44	Fourth round	

== Sønderjyske in Europe ==
Season	Competition	Round	Club	Home	Away	Agg
2016–17	UEFA Europa League	2Q	(Norway) Strømsgodset	2–1	2–2 (aet)	4–3
2016–17	UEFA Europa League	3Q	(Poland) Zagłębie Lubin	1–1	2–1	3–2
2016–17	UEFA Europa League	PO	(Czech Republic) Sparta Prague	0–0	2–3	2–3
2020–21	UEFA Europa League	3Q	(Czech Republic) Viktoria Plzeň	—N/a	0–3	—N/a

== Managers ==
- (Denmark) Poul Hansen (1989–96)
- (Denmark) Knud Nørregaard (1996)
- (Denmark) Frank Andersen (1997–03)
- (Denmark) Søren Kusk (1 January 2004 – 26 August 2005)
- (Denmark) Morten Bruun (2005–06)
- (Denmark) Ole Schwennesen (2006–07)
- (Denmark) Carsten Broe (24 April 2007 – 30 June 2009)
- (Denmark) Michael Hemmingsen (1 July 2009 – 17 September 2009)
- (Denmark) Frank Andersen (18 September 2009 – 31 December 2009)
- (Denmark) Michael Hemmingsen (1 January 2010 – 30 June 2011)
- (Denmark) Lars Søndergaard (1 July 2011 – 30 June 2015)
- (Denmark) Jakob Michelsen (1 July 2015 – 31 December 2016)
- (Denmark) Claus Nørgaard (5 January 2017 – 17 December 2018)
- (Denmark) Glen Riddersholm (1 February 2019 – 26 May 2021)
- (Germany) Michael Boris (19 June 2021 – 1 November 2021)
- (Denmark) Henrik Hansen (16 December 2021 – 5 November 2022)
- (Denmark) Thomas Nørgaard (15 December 2022 – 10 June 2026)
- (Denmark) Fatah Abdirahman (19 June 2026 – 6 November 2026)
