= 2021–22 AaB season =

AaB
2021–22 season
- Sports director: Inge André Olsen
- Head coach: Martí Cifuentes
- Stadium: Aalborg Portland Park
- Danish Superliga: 3rd
- Danish Cup: 4th round
- Top goalscorer: League: Iver Fossum (5); All: Iver Fossum (8)
- Highest home attendance: 8,123
- Lowest home attendance: 3,784 (Note: The capacity of Aalborg Portland Park limited to prevent the spread of COVID-19)
- Average home league attendance: 6,662

The 2021–22 season is AaB's 39th consecutive season in the top flight of Danish football, 32nd consecutive season in the Danish Superliga, and 136th year in existence as a football club.

== Club ==
=== Coaching staff ===
Position	Staff
Head coach	(Spain) Martí Cifuentes
Assistant coaches	(Denmark) Rasmus Würtz (Sweden) Oscar Hiljemark
Head of football	(Denmark) Søren Krogh
Goalkeeping coach	(Denmark) Poul Buus
Analyst	(Denmark) Jim Holm Larsen
Psychological consultant	(Denmark) Martin Langagergaard
Team leader	(Denmark) Ernst Damborg
Doctor	(Denmark) Jens Lykkegaard Olesen
Physiotherapist	(Denmark) Morten Skjoldager
Physical trainer	(England) Ashley Tootle (until 31 July 2021) (Spain) Javier Durán

Source: AaB Fodbold

=== Other information ===
Owner	(Denmark) AaB A/S
Chief executive	(Denmark) Thomas Bælum
Chief commercial officer	(Denmark) Jesper Elkjær
Sports director	(Norway) Inge André Olsen
Head of press and communications	(Denmark) Brian Andersen
Head of experience	(Denmark) Martin Stigaard Skammelsen
Head of sales	(Denmark) Morten Brinkmann
Head of talents	(Denmark) Anders Damgaard
Head of security	(Denmark) Kim Kyst
Ground (capacity and dimensions)	Aalborg Portland Park (13,997 / 105x70 metres)
Training ground	AaB Training Ground

Source: AaB Fodbold

== Squad ==
=== First team squad ===
This squad list includes any first team squad player who has been available for the line-up during the season.

No.	Pos.	Nation	Player
1	GK	(Sweden) SWE	Jacob Rinne
2	DF	(Denmark) DEN	Kristoffer Pallesen
3	DF	(Denmark) DEN	Jakob Ahlmann
4	DF	(Denmark) DEN	Mathias Ross
5	DF	(Norway) NOR	Daniel Granli
6	MF	(Portugal) POR	Pedro Ferreira
7	FW	(North Macedonia) MKD	Aleksandar Trajkovski (from 31 August 2021)
8	MF	(Norway) NOR	Iver Fossum
9	FW	(Serbia) SRB	Milan Makarić
10	FW	(Denmark) DEN	Lucas Andersen (captain)
11	FW	(Sweden) SWE	Tim Prica
14	MF	(Denmark) DEN	Malthe Højholt
15	DF	(Denmark) DEN	Anders Hagelskjær
16	MF	(Denmark) DEN	Magnus Christensen

No.	Pos.	Nation	Player
17	FW	(Denmark) DEN	Kasper Kusk
18	MF	(Denmark) DEN	Louka Prip
19	FW	(Denmark) DEN	Anosike Ementa
20	MF	(Denmark) DEN	Oliver Klitten (until 22 July 2021)
22	GK	(Denmark) DEN	Andreas Hansen
23	MF	(Uganda) UGA	Robert Kakeeto (until 31 August 2021)
24	DF	(Serbia) SRB	Vladimir Prijović
25	MF	(Denmark) DEN	Frederik Børsting
26	DF	(Denmark) DEN	Rasmus Thelander (Vice-captain)
28	MF	(Denmark) DEN	Jeppe Pedersen (until 29 July 2021)
29	FW	(Denmark) DEN	Oliver Børsting (until 24 July 2021)
30	FW	(Spain) ESP	Rufo
32	DF	(Denmark) DEN	Casper Gedsted
35	FW	(Denmark) DEN	Marcus Hannesbo

Source: AaB Fodbold website

=== Youth players in use ===
This list includes any youth player from AaB Academy who has been used in the season.

No.	Pos.	Nation	Player
39	FW	(Denmark) DEN	Oliver Ross (from AaB U19)

== Transfers and loans ==
=== In ===
==== Summer ====
Squad #	Position	Player	Transferred from	Date	Source
15	DF	(Denmark) Anders Hagelskjær	(Denmark) Silkeborg IF	17 June 2021	
19	FW	(Denmark) Anosike Ementa	(Denmark) AaB Academy	17 June 2021	
29	FW	(Denmark) Oliver Børsting	(Denmark) AaB Academy	17 June 2021	
32	DF	(Denmark) Casper Gedsted	(Denmark) AaB Academy	17 June 2021	
18	MF	(Denmark) Louka Prip	(Denmark) AC Horsens	18 June 2021	
9	FW	(Serbia) Milan Makarić	(Serbia) FK Radnik Surdulica	16 July 2021	

=== Out ===
==== Summer ====
Squad #	Position	Player	Transferred to	Date	Source
7	MF	(Sweden) Oscar Hiljemark	Retirement	16 June 2020	
15	DF	(Denmark) Lukas Klitten	(Italy) Frosinone Calcio	18 June 2021	
9	FW	(Netherlands) Tom van Weert	(Greece) Volos F.C.	1 July 2021	

=== Loan in ===
Squad #	Position	Player	Loaned from	Start	End	Source
7	FW	(North Macedonia) Aleksandar Trajkovski	(Spain) RCD Mallorca	31 August 2021	30 June 2022	

=== Loan out ===
Squad #	Position	Player	Loaned to	Start	End	Source
20	MF	(Denmark) Oliver Klitten	(Denmark) Hobro IK	22 July 2021	30 June 2022	
19	MF	(Denmark) Oliver Børsting	(Denmark) Skive IK	24 July 2021	30 June 2022	
28	MF	(Denmark) Jeppe Pedersen	(Denmark) Vendsyssel FF	29 July 2021	30 June 2022	
23	MF	(Uganda) Robert Kakeeto	(Denmark) Skive IK	31 August 2021	30 June 2022	

== Friendlies ==
=== Pre-season ===
24 June 2021 Friendly	Hobro IK (Denmark)	1 – 0	AaB	Hobro, Denmark
13:00 CEST	Elkær 82'	Report		Stadium: Hobro IK training ground

26 June 2021 Friendly	AaB	2 – 2	(Denmark) Viborg FF	Aalborg, Denmark
14:00 CEST	Prica 51' (pen.); Ferreira 69'	Report	Grønning 60'; Berger 86'	Stadium: AaB training ground

30 June 2021 Friendly	AaB	0 – 0	(Denmark) Esbjerg fB	Aalborg, Denmark
14:00 CEST		Report		Stadium: AaB training ground Referee: Mikkel Redder

3 July 2021 Friendly	Vejle Boldklub (Denmark)	1 – 1	AaB	Vejle, Denmark
14:30 CEST	Schoop 63'; Høllsberg (red card) 70'	Report	Prip 63'	Stadium: Vejle Stadium; Attendance: 425; Referee: Sandi Putros

9 July 2021 Friendly	AaB	1 – 0	(Denmark) AGF	Aalborg, Denmark
16:00 CEST	Kusk 90+2'	Report		Stadium: AaB training ground

== Competitions ==
=== Competition record ===
Competition	Record							
Competition	G	W	D	L	GF	GA	GD	Win %
Superliga	11	6	3	2	18	9	+9	54.55
Danish Cup	2	2	0	0	17	0	+17	100.00
Total	13	8	3	2	35	9	+26	61.54

=== Superliga ===
==== Results summary ====
Overall								Home						Away					
Pld	W	D	L	GF	GA	GD	Pts	W	D	L	GF	GA	GD	W	D	L	GF	GA	GD
32	13	6	13	47	45	+2	45	6	2	8	24	23	+1	7	4	5	23	22	+1

Last updated: 22 May 2022.
Source: Competitive matches

==== Regular season ====
Pos	Team	Pld	W	D	L	GF	GA	GD	Pts	Qualification
2	Midtjylland	22	13	3	6	37	22	+15	42	Qualification for the Championship round
3	Brøndby	22	11	7	4	30	24	+6	40	Qualification for the Championship round
4	AaB	22	11	5	6	36	26	+10	38	Qualification for the Championship round
5	Randers	22	9	6	7	26	25	+1	33	Qualification for the Championship round
6	Silkeborg	22	7	10	5	34	21	+13	31	Qualification for the Championship round

Source: Danish Football Association (in Danish), Soccerway
Rules for classification: 1) Points; 2) Goal difference; 3) Goals scored; 4) Away goals scored; 5) Play-off (played on neutral ground if determining teams for different rounds); 6) Draw.

===== Matches =====
18 July 2021 1	F.C. København	2 – 2	AaB	Copenhagen
16:00 CEST	Wilczek 38'; Daramy 47'; Boilesen (red card) 73'	Report	Prip 37'; Kusk 69'	Stadium: Parken; Attendance: 13,326; Referee: Mads-Kristoffer Kristoffersen

24 July 2021 2	AaB	0 – 1	FC Midtjylland	Aalborg
18:00 CEST		Report	Brumado 29'	Stadium: Aalborg Portland Park; Attendance: 3,784; Referee: Jakob Kehlet

1 August 2021 3	Silkeborg IF	0 – 0	AaB	Silkeborg
14:00 CEST		Report		Stadium: JYSK Park; Attendance: 3,360; Referee: Sandi Putros

8 August 2021 4	AaB	2 – 0	AGF	Aalborg
18:00 CEST	Fossum 32'; M. Ross 51'	Report		Stadium: Aalborg Portland Park; Attendance: 7,903; Referee: Jørgen Daugbjerg Burchardt

16 August 2021 5	Vejle Boldklub	0 – 1	AaB	Vejle
19:00 CEST		Report	Fossum 33'	Stadium: Vejle Stadion; Attendance: 4,350; Referee: Jakob Kehlet

22 August 2021 6	Randers FC	1 – 1	AaB	Randers
14:00 CEST	Hammershøj-Mistrati 24' (pen.)	Report	Makarić 19'	Stadium: Cepheus Park Randers; Attendance: 4,906; Referee: Mikkel Redder

27 August 2021 7	AaB	2 – 1	FC Nordsjælland	Aalborg
19:00 CEST	Thelander 13'; Fossum 49'	Report	Diomande 1'	Stadium: Aalborg Portland Park; Attendance: 5,416; Referee: Aydin Uslu

12 September 2021 8	Viborg FF	2 – 3	AaB	Viborg
14:00 CEST	Lauritsen 10'; Grønning 83'	Report	Ferreira 44', 53'; Kusk 86'	Stadium: Energi Viborg Arena; Attendance: 6,014; Referee: Peter Kjærsgaard

17 September 2021 9	AaB	2 – 0	OB	Aalborg
19:00 CEST	Thelander 70'; Hagelskjær 84'	Report		Stadium: Aalborg Portland Park; Attendance: 8,123; Referee: Jens Maae

26 September 2021 10	Brøndby IF	2 – 1	AaB	Brøndbyvester
18:00 CEST	Uhre 49', 76'	Report	Prip 27'	Stadium: Brøndby Stadion; Attendance: 18,154; Referee: Sandi Putros

3 October 2021 11	AaB	4 – 0	SønderjyskE	Aalborg
14:00 CEST	Fossum 10', 57'; Makarić 41'; Prip 53'	Report		Stadium: Aalborg Portland Park; Attendance: 8,085; Referee: Mikkel Redder

18 October 2021 12	AGF	1 – 0	AaB	Aarhus
19:00 CET	Þorsteinsson (yellow card) 4'; Poulsen (yellow card) 24'; Brandhof 45+6' (yellow card) 90+6'	Report	Ross (yellow card) 21'; Granli (yellow card) 26'; Pedro Ferreira (yellow card) 76'	Stadium: Ceres Park; Attendance: 19,143; Referee: (Denmark) Jakob Sundberg

25 October 2021 13	AaB	2 – 5	Viborg FF	Aalborg
19:00 CET	Prip 45+4'; Makarić 76'	Report	Jacob Bonde 9' (pen.); Bakiz 45+1'; Lonwijk 51'; Leemans 68'; Lauritsen 79'	Stadium: Aalborg Portland Park; Attendance: 7,322; Referee: (Denmark) Michael Tykgaard

31 October 2021 14	FC Nordsjælland	0 – 2	AaB	Farum
14:00 CET	Frese (yellow card) 54'; Thychosen (yellow card) 70'; Bredahl (yellow card) 90+6'	Report	Christensen (yellow card) 45+2'; Fossum 45+4' (pen.); Prica 71'	Stadium: Right to Dream Park; Attendance: 2,511; Referee: (Denmark) Anders Poulsen (referee)

7 November 2021 15	AaB	1 – 1	Randers FC	Aalborg
14:00 CET	Makarić 1'; Pedro Ferreira (yellow card) 90+1' (yellow-red card) 90+2'	Report	Kamara 56' (yellow card) 87'; Piesinger (yellow card) 90+6'	Stadium: Aalborg Portland Park; Attendance: 7,266; Referee: (Denmark) Jonas Hansen

22 November 2021 16	SønderjyskE	1 – 3	AaB	Haderslev
19:00 CET	Holm 35' (pen.) (yellow card) 72'	Report	Rinne (yellow card) 34'; Thelander (yellow card) 34'; Prip 38' 90'; Kusk 54'	Stadium: Sydbank Park; Attendance: 3,873; Referee: (Denmark) Peter Kjærsgaard-Andersen

28 November 2021 17	AaB	1 – 3	F.C. København	Aalborg
18:00 CET	Prip 16'; Pedro Ferreira (yellow card) 45+1'; Ross (yellow card) 49'; Pallesen (yellow card) 87'	Report	Lerager 15' (yellow card) 30'; Pep Biel (yellow card) 18'; Bardghji 31'; Bøving 41'; Khocholava (yellow card) 63'; Kristiansen (yellow card) 85'; Grabara (yellow card) 87'	Stadium: Aalborg Portland Park; Attendance: 10,254; Referee: (Denmark) Jakob Kehlet

20 February 2022 18	FC Midtjylland	0 – 2	AaB	Herning
14:00 CET	Sviatchenko (yellow card) 6'; Charles (yellow card) 23'; Fraulo (yellow card) 90'	Report	Pallesen (yellow card) 12'; Granli 28'; Højholt (yellow card) 33'; Høgh 56'; Hagelskjær (yellow card) 90+4'	Stadium: MCH Arena; Attendance: 9,004; Referee: (Denmark) Morten Krogh

27 February 2022 19	AaB	1 – 4	Silkeborg IF	Aalborg
14:00 CET	Børsting (yellow card) 26'; Rufo (yellow card) 69'; Høgh 83'	Report	Helenius 66' 69' (pen.) 78'; Jørgensen 72'; Gojani (red card) 90+1'	Stadium: Aalborg Portland Park; Attendance: 7,142; Referee: (Denmark) Mikkel Redder

6 March 2022 20	AaB	0 – 0	Vejle Boldklub	Aalborg
16:00 CET	Hagelskjær (yellow card) 31'; Christensen (yellow card) 49'; Ementa (yellow card) 90+3'; Granli (yellow card) 90+7'	Report	Albentosa (yellow card) 33'; Gundelund (yellow card) 61'; Albornoz (yellow card) 90+2'; Ofori (yellow card) 90+5'; Drammeh (yellow card) 90+7'	Stadium: Aalborg Portland Park; Attendance: 7,340; Referee: (Denmark) Sandi Putros

14 March 2022 21	OB	2 – 3	AaB	Odense
19:00 CET	Jebali 15'; Fenger 53'	Report	Høgh 3'; Thelander (yellow card) 7'; Højholt (yellow card) 39'; Makarić 62'; Kusk 77'; Pallesen (yellow card) 81'	Stadium: Nature Energy Park; Attendance: 6,153; Referee: (Denmark) Jakob Sundberg

20 March 2022 22	AaB	3 – 0	Brøndby IF	Aalborg
14:30 CET	Prip 34' (pen.) 61' (pen.); Makarić 70'; Granli (yellow card) 90+1'	Report	Heggheim (red card) 59'; Ben Slimane (yellow card) 67'; Björk (yellow card) 81'	Stadium: Aalborg Portland Park; Attendance: 11,083; Referee: (Denmark) Jens Maae

==== Championship Round ====
3 April 2022 23	AaB	–	FC Copenhagen	Aalborg
CET				Stadium: Aalborg Portland Park

8 April 2022 24	AaB	–	Randers	Aalborg
CET				Stadium: Aalborg Portland Park

14 April 2022 25	Brøndby	–	AaB	Brøndbyvester
CET				Stadium: Brøndby Stadium

18 April 2022 26	Midtjylland	–	AaB	Herning
CET				Stadium: MCH Arena

24 April 2022 27	AaB	–	Silkeborg	Aalborg
CET				Stadium: Aalborg Portland Park

=== Danish Cup ===
31 August 2021 2nd round	FIUK/Odense (7)	0 – 13	AaB	Odense
18:00 CEST		Report	Kusk 1', 23', 35', 76'; O. Ross 10', 17'; Makarić 60', 64'; Fossum 66', 83'; Hagelskjær 70'; Hannesbo 72'; Prip 75'	Stadium: Odense Atletikstadion; Referee: Mads-Kristoffer Kristoffersen

21 September 2021 3rd round	Lyngby BK (2)	0 – 4	AaB	Kongens Lyngby
18:30 CEST		Report	Fossum 22'; Makarić 31'; Børsting 48'; Hannesbo 84'	Stadium: Lyngby Stadion; Attendance: 2,361; Referee: Jakob Sundberg

28 October 2021 4th round	FC Midtjylland (1)	3 – 1 (a.e.t.)	AaB	Herning
19:45 CET	Sisto (yellow card) 45+3'; Andersson 56'; Lössl (yellow card) 90+2'; Evander 102'; Isaksen 110' (yellow card) 111'	Report	Ross (yellow card) 45+3'; Højholt (yellow card) 45+4'; Prip 90+3'; Thelander (yellow card) 118'	Stadium: MCH Arena; Attendance: 0 Referee: (Denmark) Peter Kjærsgaard-Andersen

== Statistics ==
=== Appearances ===
As of 3 October 2021

This includes all competitive matches. The list is sorted by shirt number when appearances are equal.

Rnk	Pos	No.	Player	Superliga	Danish Cup	Total
1	DF	2	(Denmark) Kristoffer Pallesen	11	2	13
1	MF	8	(Norway) Iver Fossum	11	2	13
1	MF	14	(Denmark) Malthe Højholt	11	2	13
1	FW	18	(Denmark) Louka Prip	11	2	13
1	MF	25	(Denmark) Frederik Børsting	11	2	13
6	DF	3	(Denmark) Jakob Ahlmann	10	2	12
6	DF	5	(Norway) Daniel Granli	10	2	12
6	FW	9	(Serbia) Milan Makarić	10	2	12
6	DF	26	(Denmark) Rasmus Thelander	11	1	12
10	GK	1	(Sweden) Jacob Rinne	11	0	11
10	FW	11	(Sweden) Tim Prica	10	1	11
12	DF	4	(Denmark) Mathias Ross	10	0	10
12	MF	6	(Portugal) Pedro Ferreira	9	1	10
12	DF	15	(Denmark) Anders Hagelskjær	8	2	10
12	MF	16	(Denmark) Magnus Christensen	8	2	10
12	FW	35	(Denmark) Marcus Hannesbo	8	2	10
17	FW	17	(Denmark) Kasper Kusk	7	2	9
18	FW	7	(North Macedonia) Aleksandar Trajkovski	4	1	5
19	GK	22	(Denmark) Andreas Hansen	0	2	2
19	MF	30	(Spain) Rufo	2	0	2
21	DF	32	(Denmark) Casper Gedsted	0	1	1
21	FW	39	(Denmark) Oliver Ross	0	1	1

=== Goalscorers ===
As of 3 October 2021

This includes all competitive matches. The list is sorted by shirt number when total goals are equal.

Rnk	Pos	No.	Player	Superliga	Danish Cup	Total
1	MF	8	(Norway) Iver Fossum	5	3	8
1	FW	17	(Denmark) Kasper Kusk	2	4	6
3	FW	9	(Serbia) Milan Makarić	2	3	5
4	FW	18	(Denmark) Louka Prip	3	1	4
5	MF	6	(Portugal) Pedro Ferreira	2	0	2
5	DF	15	(Denmark) Anders Hagelskjær	1	1	2
5	DF	26	(Denmark) Rasmus Thelander	2	0	2
5	FW	35	(Denmark) Marcus Hannesbo	0	2	2
5	FW	39	(Denmark) Oliver Ross	0	2	2
10	DF	4	(Denmark) Mathias Ross	1	0	1
10	MF	25	(Denmark) Frederik Børsting	0	1	1
TOTALS				18	17	35

=== Assists ===
As of 3 October 2021

This includes all competitive matches. The list is sorted by shirt number when total assists are equal.

Rnk	Pos	No.	Player	Superliga	Danish Cup	Total
1	MF	8	(Norway) Iver Fossum	4	3	7
2	DF	2	(Denmark) Kristoffer Pallesen	5	0	5
3	FW	9	(Serbia) Milan Makarić	2	2	4
4	MF	25	(Denmark) Frederik Børsting	3	0	3
5	MF	14	(Denmark) Malthe Højholt	0	2	2
5	FW	17	(Denmark) Kasper Kusk	0	2	2
7	DF	3	(Denmark) Jakob Ahlmann	1	0	1
7	FW	7	(North Macedonia) Aleksandar Trajkovski	0	1	1
7	FW	18	(Denmark) Louka Prip	1	0	1
TOTALS				16	10	26

=== Clean sheets ===
As of 3 October 2021

This includes all competitive matches. The list is sorted by shirt number when total clean sheets are equal.

Rnk	Pos	No.	Player	Superliga	Danish Cup	Total
1	GK	1	(Sweden) Jacob Rinne	5	0	5
2	GK	22	(Denmark) Andreas Hansen	0	2	2
TOTALS				5	2	7

=== Disciplinary record ===
As of 3 October 2021

This includes all competitive matches. The list is sorted by shirt number when total cards are equal.

Rnk	Pos.	No.	Player	Superliga		Danish Cup		Total	
Rnk	Pos.	No.	Player	Booked	Sent off (straight red)	Booked	Sent off (straight red)	Booked	Sent off (straight red)
1	DF	3	(Denmark) Jakob Ahlmann	4	0	0	0	4	0
1	MF	6	(Portugal) Pedro Ferreira	4	0	0	0	4	0
2	DF	4	(Denmark) Mathias Ross	3	0	0	0	3	0
2	MF	14	(Denmark) Malthe Højholt	3	0	0	0	3	0
2	MF	16	(Denmark) Magnus Christensen	3	0	0	0	3	0
2	MF	25	(Denmark) Frederik Børsting	2	0	1	0	3	0
2	DF	26	(Denmark) Rasmus Thelander	3	0	0	0	3	0
8	DF	2	(Denmark) Kristoffer Pallesen	2	0	0	0	2	0
9	MF	8	(Norway) Iver Fossum	0	0	1	0	1	0
9	FW	9	(Serbia) Milan Makarić	1	0	0	0	1	0
9	DF	15	(Denmark) Anders Hagelskjær	1	0	0	0	1	0
9	Physical trainer	–	(Spain) Javier Durán	1	0	0	0	1	0
TOTALS				27	0	2	0	29	0

=== Suspensions ===
As of 3 October 2021

This includes all competitive matches. The list is sorted by shirt number when total matches suspended are equal.

Rnk	Pos	No.	Player	Superliga	Danish Cup	Total
1	DF	3	(Denmark) Jakob Ahlmann	1	0	1
1	MF	6	(Portugal) Pedro Ferreira	1	0	1
TOTALS				2	0	2

== Awards ==
=== Team ===
Award	Month	Source

=== Individual ===
No.	Player	Award	Month	Source
Physio	(Denmark) Morten Skjoldager	UEFA President's Award	August 2021	
