= 2023 Danish Cup final =

2023 Pokalen final
- Event: 2022–23 Danish Cup
AaB	Copenhagen
0	1
- Date: 18 May 2023
- Venue: Parken, Copenhagen
- Referee: Jakob A. Sundberg
- Attendance: 34,937
- Weather: 13°C, sunny, 55% humidity

The 2023 Danish Cup final was played on 18 May 2023 between AaB and Copenhagen at Parken, Copenhagen. The final match will the culmination of the 2022–23 Danish Cup, the 69th season of the Pokalen. Copenhagen triumphed thanks to a 48th minute goal from Diogo Gonçalves. It is the 9th Cup title for the Lions.

AaB appeared in its 13th Cup final, having won three previous titles, the most recent in 2014. Copenhagen, an 8-time champion, competed in its 13th final.

By virtue of its win, Copenhagen earned an automatic berth into the playoff round of the 2023–24 UEFA Europa League.

== Teams ==
Team	Previous finals appearances (bold indicates winners)
AaB	12 (1966, 1967, **1970**, 1987, **1991**, 1993, 1999, 2000, 2004, 2009, **2014**, 2020)
Copenhagen	12 (**1995**, **1997**, 1998, 2002, **2004**, 2007, **2009**, **2012**, 2014, **2015**, **2016**, **2017**)

== Venue ==
The final was played in Parken Stadium in Copenhagen, the 28th time Parken has hosted the Pokalen final.

== Route to the final ==
Note: In all results below, the score of the finalist is given first (H: home; A: away).

AaB		Round	Copenhagen	
Opponent	Result		Opponent	Result
Bye		First round	Bye	
Bye		Second round	Bye	
Vanløse IF	1–3 (a.e.t.) (A)	Third round	Hobro IK	1–1 (a.e.t.) (A); 3–5 pen.
Middelfart BK	1–2 (A)	Fourth round	Thisted FC	1–3 (a.e.t) (A)
Viborg FF	**2–1 (agg.)**; 0–1 (A) / 2–0 (H)	Quarterfinals	Vejle BK	**2–0 (agg.)**; 0–0 (A) / 2–0 (H)
Silkeborg IF	**5–2 (agg.)**; 1–1 (A) / 4–1 (H)	Semifinals	FC Nordsjælland	**7–6 (agg.)**; 2–3 (A) / 5–3 (H)

== Match ==
=== Details ===
18 May 2023
17:00
Final

AaB (1)	0–1	Copenhagen (1)
Jørgensen (yellow card) 49'; Thelander (yellow card) 79'; Ementa (yellow card) 90+3'	Report	Gonçalves 48'; Jelert (yellow card) 82'; Haraldsson (yellow card) 86'; Grabara (yellow card) 90+3'; Claesson (yellow card) 90+6'

Parken, Copenhagen
Attendance: 34,937
Referee: Jakob A. Sundberg

**AaB**	**Copenhagen**

GK	40	(Germany) Nico Mantl
CB	26	(Denmark) Rasmus Thelander (yellow card) 79'
LB	5	(Norway) Daniel Granli (substituted off) 74'
CB	4	(Norway) Lars Kramer
RB	20	(Denmark) Kasper Jørgensen (yellow card) 49' (substituted off) 85'
MF	8	(Norway) Iver Fossum
MF	6	(Portugal) Pedro Ferreira (substituted off) 75'
MF	14	(Denmark) Malthe Højholt
MF	10	(Denmark) Lucas Andersen
MF	23	(Denmark) Younes Bakiz (substituted off) 85'
FW	17	(Denmark) Nicklas Helenius (substituted off) 75'
Substitutes:
DF	3	(Denmark) Jakob Ahlmann (substituted on) 74'
MF	18	(Denmark) Louka Prip (substituted on) 75'
FW	19	(Denmark) Anosike Ementa (substituted on) 75' (yellow card) 90+3'
FW	38	(Denmark) Oliver Ross (substituted on) 85'
DF	32	(Germany) Kilian Ludewig (substituted on) 85'
GK	22	(Denmark) Theo Sander
DF	24	(Norway) Jonas Skulstad
FW	7	(Brazil) Allan Sousa
DF	34	(Denmark) Sebastian Otoa
Coach:
(Sweden) Oscar Hiljemark

GK	1	(Poland) Kamil Grabara (yellow card) 90+3'
LB	6	(Denmark) Christian Sørensen
CB	3	(Slovakia) Denis Vavro
CB	27	(Denmark) Valdemar Lund
RB	19	(Denmark) Elias Jelert (yellow card) 82'
MF	33	(Denmark) Rasmus Falk (substituted off) 38'
MF	7	(Sweden) Viktor Claesson (yellow card) 90+6'
MF	9	(Portugal) Diogo Gonçalves 48' (substituted off) 70'
MF	36	(Denmark) William Clem
MF	25	(Sweden) Jordan Larsson
FW	30	(Iceland) Hákon Arnar Haraldsson (substituted off) 89'
Substitutes:
MF	40	(Sweden) Roony Bardghji (substituted on) 38' (substituted off) 89'
MF	35	(New Zealand) Marko Stamenić (substituted on) 70'
MF	8	(Iceland) Ísak Bergmann Jóhannesson (substituted on) 89'
DF	2	(Netherlands) Kevin Diks (substituted on) 89'
FW	29	(France) Mamoudou Karamoko
GK	21	(Sweden) Karl-Johan Johnsson
FW	15	(Denmark) Mohamed Daramy
DF	22	(Denmark) Peter Ankersen
MF	17	(Nigeria) Paul Mukairu
Coach:
(Denmark) Jacob Neestrup

Assistant referees: Dennis Rasmussen, Victor Skytte
Fourth Official: Mikkel Redder

**Match rules**

- 90 minutes.
- 30 minutes of extra time if necessary.
- Penalty shoot-out if scores still level.
- Seven named substitutes, of which up to five may be used.
