= 2022–23 Brøndby IF season =

57th season in existence of Brøndby IF

Brøndby
2022–23 season
- Chairman: Jan Bech Andersen
- Head coach: Niels Frederiksen (until 14 November); Jesper Sørensen (from 2 January)
- Stadium: Brøndby Stadium
- Danish Superliga: 5th
- Danish Cup: Third round
- UEFA Europa Conference League: Third qualifying round
- Top goalscorer: League: Ohi Omoijuanfo (13); All: Ohi Omoijuanfo (13)
Home colours	Away colours

The 2022–23 Brøndby IF season was Brøndby IF's 42nd consecutive season in top-division of the Danish football league, the 33rd consecutive in Danish Superliga, and the 57th as a football club. Besides the Superliga, the club also competed in the Danish Cup and this season's editions of the UEFA Europa Conference League. It was the fourth season with head coach Niels Frederiksen, after he replaced caretaker manager Martin Retov during the 2019–20 campaign.

The team started the season poorly and by the end of August were in the lower realms of the league table, where they remained until the winter break. As a result of the disappointing results, head coach Niels Frederiksen was sacked in November, and replaced by his former assistant Jesper Sørensen. By the end of March, results had improved somewhat and being in sixth place, they secured a spot in the championship round. The mixed results continued, and Brøndby finished the season in fifth place in the league table, missing out on European play-offs by a margin of seven points.

Brøndby also competed in two knock-out competitions, the UEFA Europa Conference League, and the Danish Cup. In Europe, they were eliminated in the third qualifying round to Basel after a penalty-shootout, and in the Danish Cup they suffered a humiliating 4–0 defeat to third tier Aarhus Fremad, also in the third round.

== Season summary ==
=== July–August ===
After winning the championship in 2021, head coach Niels Frederiksen had to watch his team slowly disintegrate. One key player after another had left (Jesper Lindstrøm to Eintracht Frankfurt in July 2021, Morten Frendrup to Genoa and Mikael Uhre to Philadelphia Union in January 2022), and the cohesive unit that had won the club's first championship in 16 years had transformed into a significantly different and more fragile entity by the start of the 2022–23 season. On the opening matchday of the 2022–23 season, which took place on 17 July 2023 against AGF, Frederiksen made a notable change in his team's formation. He shifted from the previously successful 3–5–2 formation to a 4–3–3 setup, introducing academy players Mathias Kvistgaarden and the 16-year-old Oscar Schwartau into the attacking lineup. However, the previously solid defensive structure seemed to have vanished, leading to an increased number of opportunities for their opponents. Subsequent matches were marred by tactical confusion as Frederiksen experimented with a 4–4–2 diamond formation; without improvement. The team continued to allow too many scoring opportunities to their rivals while struggling to create chances of their own.

Part of the tactical confusion stemmed from a shortage of players capable of executing their roles within the system. The reinforcements that the squad had been craving arrived too late in the transfer window, which had immediate consequences for the results. This included an early exit from the UEFA Europa Conference League: after comfortably defeating Polish side Pogoń Szczecin 5–1 on aggregate, they were eliminated on penalties by Basel in the third qualification round. In the league, Brøndby had also faced challenges, seeing them in 10th place in the league table at the end of August, after winning just two games and losing five in July and August, including a 4–1 loss to FC Copenhagen in the Copenhagen Derby on 7 August. The derby was marred by hooliganism, including incidents of pyrotechnics, vandalism, and objects being thrown both before and during the match. Both teams were penalised with a DKK 300,000 and 150,000 fine, respectively, by the Football Disciplinary Board of the Danish Football Association (DBU).

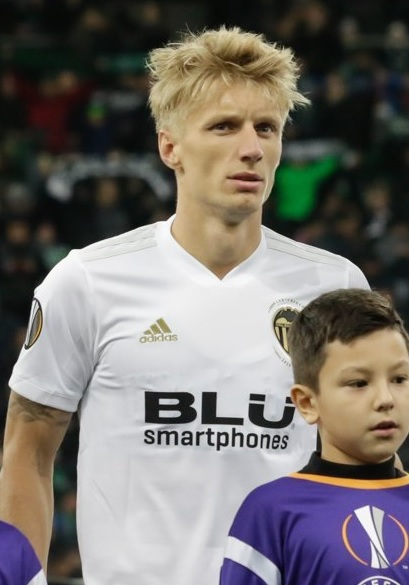
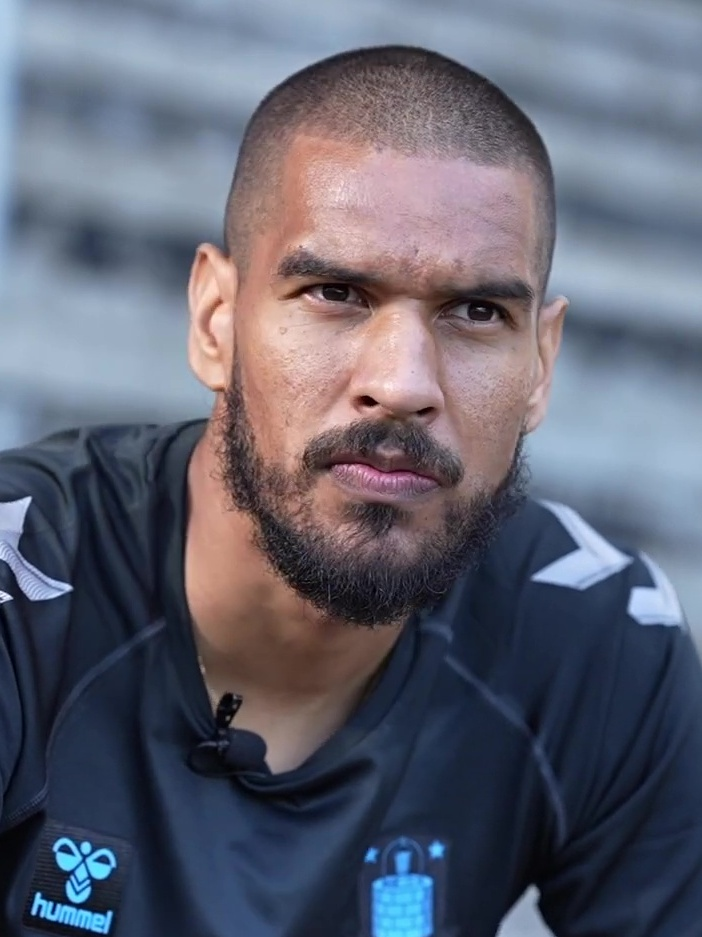
Late in the transfer window, Brøndby secured the services of high-profile signings Daniel Wass (left) and Ohi Omoijuanfo (right)

On 12 August 2022, just a day after their elimination from European competition, Brøndby made a significant announcement regarding the return of Daniel Wass to the club. This move had been surrounded by rumours for years, as fans eagerly anticipated his return to his childhood club. Brøndby reportedly paid a fee of €1.7 million to La Liga club Atlético Madrid to secure his services, and Wass signed a three-year contract with the club. Shortly before the transfer window closed, Brøndby also signed Ohi Omoijuanfo, a renowned target forward and prolific goal-scorer, from Red Star Belgrade. This signing was aimed at strengthening their offensive capabilities. Brøndby also welcomed Nicolai Vallys from Silkeborg to their squad, a player known for his ability to operate between the opponent's lines, using his exceptional vision to both create assists and score goals.

=== September–December ===
After strengthening the team at the end of the summer transfer window, there was a noticeable improvement in results. Particularly, Omoijuanfo's clinical finishing enhanced the team's attacking play, leading to Brøndby going undefeated in the league throughout September and October. Nevertheless, during these eight games, the team drew five times, often experiencing defensive lapses late in matches as Frederiksen attempted to secure victories. Consequently, they dropped points in the closing stages against teams such as Randers, Lyngby, and Copenhagen. One of the key challenges for Brøndby was in their build-up play, as they struggled to find a player capable of efficiently transitioning the ball from defense to attack. Frederiksen primarily relied on Josip Radošević in that role, but his strengths didn't align with moving the ball forward and executing short passing. Additionally, the contributions from the full-back positions in possession were lacking consistency. Jens Martin Gammelby was in and out of the starting lineup, Daniel Wass transitioned from midfielder to right-back, and midfielder Christian Cappis had to cover the left-back position in the absence of Blas Riveros, who was sidelined due to injury.

Things took a turn for the worse in Brøndby's Danish Cup match against third-tier club Aarhus Fremad on 19 October. Described as a "sensation," the team from Aarhus N secured a surprising 4–0 victory over Brøndby. During the match, Brøndby was outplayed, and Aarhus Fremad led 3–0 at halftime. The humiliating defeat has drawn comparisons to other historic "giant-killing" upsets in Danish Cup history.

Due to Brøndby's poor performance in the first half of the season, head coach Niels Frederiksen was dismissed on 14 November, the day following the final game before the winter break, a 2–0 loss to Viborg.

=== Global Football Holdings ownership ===
Alongside disappointing on-field performances, the club ownership situation was also marked by turbulence. Amidst rumors of chairman and top shareholder Jan Bech Andersen's potential sale to the American investment company Global Football Holdings (GFH), who already owned shares in other clubs including Beveren, FC Augsburg, Estoril, ADO Den Haag and Real Salt Lake, a press conference was scheduled for 28 October. During the press conference, GFH announced their plans to initiate a tender offer to acquire slightly over 50% of Brøndby's shares. Following this acquisition, they intended to inject up to DKK 223 million (€30 million) into the club as a convertible loan. Bech Andersen would retain his role as chairman of the club and remain a major shareholder.

The takeover of the club caused a division among supporters. Some welcomed the new financial and sporting ambitions it brought to the club, while others, particularly the vocal Alpha ultras group, opposed it vehemently. They believed that multi-club ownership went against the core values of Brøndby. By this point, Alpha had already suspended their matchday activities, creating a void in the game-day atmosphere.

Protest movements emerged in response to the takeover, easily identifiable by their distinctive orange attire, in contrast to Brøndby's traditional yellow and blue colours. These protests underscored the deep divide within the fan base. Anti-ownership chants became a common occurrence, and the club's amateur branch, competing in the lower tiers of Danish football, experienced a surge in popularity, with many ultras shifting their support to these games.

Amidst this tension, Fanafdelingen (lit. 'The Fan Department'), represented by its chairman, Lars B. Petersen, and one of the new owners, Scott Krase, worked together to draft a legally binding "value agreement." This agreement aimed to uphold Brøndby's cultural identity and was approved by a significant majority of the 1,087 voters who participated in the 11 June 2023, vote.

=== January–June ===
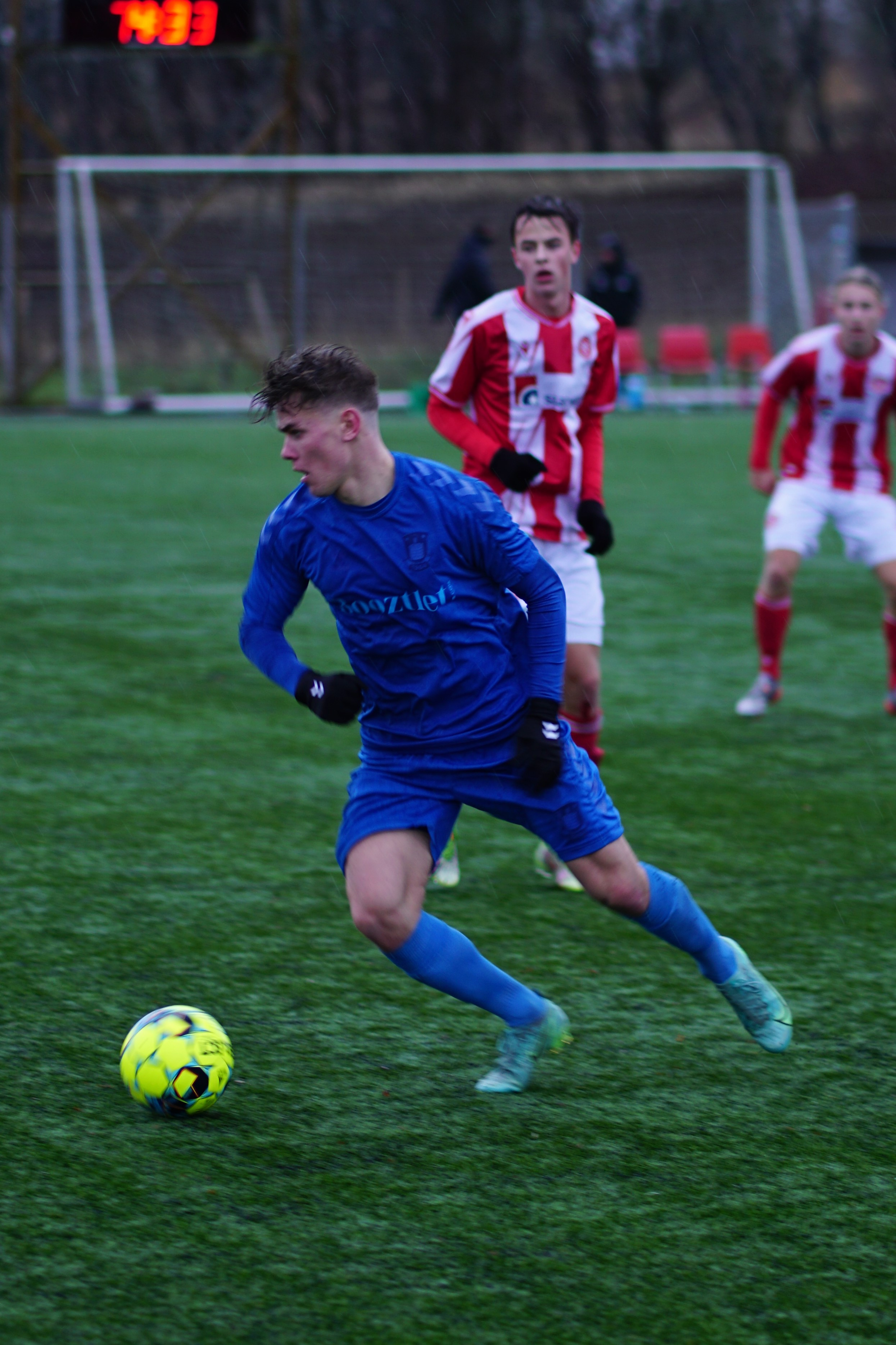
Mathias Kvistgaarden scored six goals in six games during the championship round.

On 2 January 2023, Brøndby announced Jesper Sørensen, formerly Frederiksen's assistant coach, as their new head coach. In January 2023, the club made three signings: Håkon Evjen from AZ and Rasmus Lauritsen from Dinamo Zagreb on permanent deals, as well as bringing in Frederik Winther from FC Augsburg on a short-term loan. On the other hand, captain Andreas Maxsø departed the club, as well as other first-team regular Sigurd Rosted.

Under Sørensen's leadership, Brøndby had a strong start to 2023, defeating Horsens 5–2 on 19 February and securing a 1–0 away victory against Midtjylland on 27 February. These victories propelled them from 10th to 5th place in the league table. However, the rest of the spring season posed more challenges, with two losses and a single win. Brøndby only managed to secure a spot in the championship round on the final matchday of the regular season due to Midtjylland and Silkeborg's draw. Despite a 2–1 away loss to Nordsjælland, Brøndby finished in sixth place as the league split into two.

The away loss to Nordsjælland cast a shadow over Brøndby's first few games in the championship round. A 3–0 home loss to Viborg on 2 April and another 2–1 away loss to Nordsjælland deepened their concerns. However, the worst was yet to come when the team suffered a crushing 4–0 defeat at home to Randers on 23 April. After this low point, the spring season took a positive turn for Brøndby as they lost only one game out of the remaining six. Particularly impressive during this period was Mathias Kvistgaarden, who scored six goals in six appearances. Brøndby finished the season in 5th place in the table, seven points below the European play-off match.

== Players ==
=== Squad information ===
Notes:

- Players and squad numbers last updated on 31 January 2023.
  Note: Flags indicate national team as has been defined under FIFA eligibility rules. Players may hold more than one non-FIFA nationality. Age as of 30 June 2023.
- Appearances and goals last updated on 9 June 2023, including all competitions for senior teams.
- Flags indicate national team as defined under FIFA eligibility rules. Players may hold more than one non-FIFA nationality.
- Player^{*} – Player who joined the club permanently or on loan during the season.
- Player^{†} – Player who departed the club permanently or on loan during the season.

No.	Player	Nat.	Position(s)	Date of birth (age)	Signed in	Contract ends	Signed from	Transfer fee	Apps.	Goals
Goalkeepers
1	Mads Hermansen	(Denmark)	GK	11 July 2000 (aged 22)	2019	2025	(Denmark) Brøndby Masterclass	N/A	70	0
16	Thomas Mikkelsen	(Denmark)	GK	27 August 1983 (aged 39)	2021	2023	(Denmark) Lyngby	Free	12	0
40	Jonathan Ægidius	(Denmark)	GK	22 April 2002 (aged 21)	2020	2025	(Denmark) Lyngby	N/A	0	0
Defenders
2	Sebastian Sebulonsen	(Norway)	RB	28 January 2000 (aged 23)	2022	2026	(Norway) Viking	€1.2M	24	1
3	Henrik Heggheim^{†}	(Norway)	CB	22 April 2001 (aged 22)	2021	2025	(Norway) Viking	€1.2M	28	1
4	Sigurd Rosted^{†}	(Norway)	CB	22 July 1994 (aged 28)	2019	2023	(Belgium) Gent	€0.8M	101	5
4	Frederik Winther^{*}	(Denmark)	CB	4 January 2001 (aged 22)	2023	2023	(Germany) FC Augsburg	Loan	15	0
5	Andreas Maxsø (captain)^{†}	(Denmark)	CB	18 March 1994 (aged 29)	2019	2023	Unattached	Free	112	7
5	Rasmus Lauritsen^{*}	(Denmark)	CB	27 February 1996 (aged 27)	2023	2027	(Croatia) Dinamo Zagreb	€2.5M	9	0
14	Kevin Mensah	(Denmark)	RB / LB	15 May 1991 (aged 32)	2017	2023	(Denmark) Esbjerg fB	€0.2M	136	6
15	Blas Riveros	(Paraguay)	LB	3 February 1998 (aged 25)	2020	2024	(Switzerland) Basel	€0.7M	57	2
18	Kevin Tshiembe	(Denmark)	CB	31 March 1997 (aged 26)	2021	2025	(Denmark) Lyngby	€0.5M	58	0
28	Jens Martin Gammelby^{†}	(Denmark)	RB	5 February 1995 (aged 28)	2018	2023	(Denmark) Silkeborg	€1.5M	67	2
32	Frederik Alves	(Denmark)	CB	8 November 1999 (aged 23)	2022	2026	(England) West Ham United	€1.0M	23	0
Midfielders
6	Joe Bell	(New Zealand)	DM / CM	27 April 1999 (aged 24)	2022	2026	(Norway) Viking	€1.1M	38	0
7	Nicolai Vallys	(Denmark)	AM / LW	4 September 1996 (aged 26)	2022	2026	(Denmark) Silkeborg	€3.0M	25	6
8	Mathias Greve	(Denmark)	AM / RW	11 February 1995 (aged 28)	2021	2025	(Denmark) Randers FC	€0.9M	64	1
10	Daniel Wass	(Denmark)	CM / RB	31 May 1989 (aged 34)	2022	2025	(Spain) Atlético Madrid	€1.8M	123	11
11	Håkon Evjen^{*}	(Norway)	CM / RW	14 February 2000 (aged 23)	2023	2027	(Netherlands) AZ	€2.2M	15	3
19	Bertram Kvist	(Denmark)	AM	19 March 2005 (aged 18)	2022	2025	(Denmark) Brøndby Masterclass	N/A	1	0
22	Josip Radošević	(Croatia)	DM / CM	3 April 1994 (aged 29)	2018	2025	(Croatia) Hajduk Split	€1.8M	170	7
23	Christian Cappis	(United States)	CM	13 August 1999 (aged 23)	2021	2025	(Denmark) Hobro	€0.3M	61	8
25	Anis Ben Slimane	(Tunisia)	CM / AM	16 March 2001 (aged 22)	2019	2024	(Denmark) AB	Free	121	9
29	Peter Bjur^{†}	(Denmark)	AM / LB	2 February 2000 (aged 23)	2019	2023	(Denmark) Brøndby Masterclass	N/A	36	1
39	Marinus Larsen	(Denmark)	CM	30 December 2003 (aged 19)	2022	2023	(Denmark) Brøndby Masterclass	N/A	0	0
Forwards
9	Ohi Omoijuanfo	(Norway)	ST	10 January 1994 (aged 29)	2022	2025	(Serbia) Red Star Belgrade	€1.4M	25	13
12	Carl Björk	(Sweden)	CF / LW	19 January 2000 (aged 23)	2022	2026	(Sweden) IFK Norrköping	€0.5M	14	0
20	Oskar Fallenius^{†}	(Sweden)	LW / CF / AM	11 November 2001 (aged 21)	2021	2024	(Sweden) IF Brommapojkarna	€0.2M	13	2
24	Marko Divković	(Croatia)	CF / RW	11 June 1999 (aged 24)	2022	2026	(Slovakia) Dunajská Streda	€1.0M	44	5
27	Simon Hedlund	(Sweden)	CF / RW	11 March 1993 (aged 30)	2019	2023	(Germany) Union Berlin	€1.0M	158	27
36	Mathias Kvistgaarden	(Denmark)	ST	15 April 2002 (aged 21)	2020	2025	(Denmark) Brøndby Masterclass	N/A	60	14
41	Oscar Schwartau	(Denmark)	CF / AM	17 May 2006 (aged 17)	2022	2025	(Denmark) Brøndby Masterclass	N/A	21	4

== Transfers ==
=== In ===
No.	Pos	Player	Transferred from	Fee	Date	Source
24	FW	(Croatia) Marko Divković	(Slovakia) Dunajská Streda	€1.0 million	3 March 2022 (Note: The transfer was announced on 3 March, and would become official on 1 July once the transfer window opened)	
2	DF	(Norway) Sebastian Sebulonsen	(Norway) Viking	€1.2 million	14 July 2022	
10	MF	(Denmark) Daniel Wass	(Spain) Atlético Madrid	€1.8 million	12 August 2022	
9	FW	(Norway) Ohi Omoijuanfo	(Serbia) Red Star Belgrade	€1.4 million	30 August 2022	
7	MF	(Denmark) Nicolai Vallys	(Denmark) Silkeborg IF	€3.0 million	31 August 2022	
11	MF	(Norway) Håkon Evjen	(Netherlands) AZ	€2.2 million	17 January 2023	
5	DF	(Denmark) Rasmus Lauritsen	(Croatia) Dinamo Zagreb	€2.5 million	30 January 2023	
4	DF	(Denmark) Frederik Winther	(Germany) FC Augsburg	Loan	31 January 2023	

=== Out ===
No.	Pos	Player	Transferred to	Fee	Date	Source
16	FW	(Croatia) Ante Erceg	(Hungary) Debrecen	End of contract	25 May 2022	
21	DF	(Sweden) Rasmus Wikström	(Denmark) SønderjyskE	Loan	16 June 2022	
31	FW	(Denmark) Jagvir Singh	(Denmark) FC Fredericia	Free	7 July 2022	
34	MF	(Denmark) Andreas Pyndt	(Denmark) Hvidovre IF	Loan	14 July 2022	
40	GK	(Denmark) Jonathan Ægidius	(Denmark) HIK	Loan	18 July 2022	
17	DF	(Denmark) Andreas Bruus	(France) Troyes	€1.5 million	18 July 2022	
9	FW	(Serbia) Andrija Pavlović	Unattached	Free	19 July 2022	
38	FW	(Denmark) Yousef Salech	(Denmark) HB Køge	Loan	31 August 2022	
37	DF	(Denmark) Christian Friedrich	(Denmark) Fremad Amager	Loan	31 August 2022	
29	MF	(Denmark) Peter Bjur	(Denmark) AGF	Undisclosed	27 January 2023	
5	DF	(Denmark) Andreas Maxsø	(United States) Colorado Rapids	Undisclosed	27 January 2023	
4	DF	(Norway) Sigurd Rosted	(Canada) Toronto FC	Undisclosed	31 January 2023	
2	DF	(Denmark) Jens Martin Gammelby	(Norway) HamKam	Undisclosed	14 February 2023	
20	FW	(Sweden) Oskar Fallenius	(Sweden) Djurgårdens IF	Undisclosed	27 February 2023	
3	DF	(Norway) Henrik Heggheim	(Norway) Vålerenga	Loan	14 March 2023	

== Competitions ==
=== Danish Superliga ===
==== League table ====
Pos	Team	Pld	W	D	L	GF	GA	GD	Pts	Qualification
4	AGF	22	10	5	7	26	20	+6	35	Qualification for the Championship round
5	Randers	22	8	8	6	28	30	−2	32	Qualification for the Championship round
6	Brøndby	22	8	6	8	32	34	−2	30	Qualification for the Championship round
7	Silkeborg	22	8	5	9	34	35	−1	29	Qualification for the Qualification round
8	Midtjylland	22	6	10	6	32	29	+3	28	Qualification for the Qualification round

Source: Danish Football Association (in Danish), Soccerway
Rules for classification: 1) Points; 2) Goal difference; 3) Goals scored; 4) Away goals scored; 5) Play-off (played on neutral ground if determining teams for different rounds); 6) Draw.

==== Results by round – Regular season ====
Matchday	1	2	3	4	5	6	7	8	9	10	11	12	13	14	15	16	17	18	19	20	21	22
Ground	H	H	A	A	H	A	H	A	H	A	H	A	H	A	H	A	H	H	A	A	H	A
Result	W	L	L	L	W	L	L	W	D	D	D	W	D	D	W	D	L	W	W	L	W	L
Position	3	7	9	9	9	9	10	9	9	10	10	9	8	10	9	10	10	9	5	8	5	6

Source: http://www.superliga.dk/
A = Away; H = Home; W = Win; D = Draw; L = Loss

==== Championship round ====
Pos	Team	Pld	W	D	L	GF	GA	GD	Pts	Qualification	COP	NOR	AGF	VIB	BRO	RAN
2	Nordsjælland	32	15	10	7	50	35	+15	55	Qualification for the Europa Conference League third qualifying round	3–2	—	0–1	0–0	2–1	3–1
3	AGF	32	14	9	9	42	31	+11	51	Qualification for the Europa Conference League second qualifying round	0–0	1–1	—	3–0	3–3	1–1
4	Viborg	32	14	9	9	44	35	+9	51	Qualification for the European play-off match	1–2	1–0	0–1	—	1–1	3–1
5	Brøndby	32	12	8	12	48	52	−4	44		1–3	5–1	1–0	0–3	—	0–4
6	Randers	32	10	11	11	40	47	−7	41		1–0	1–1	1–3	0–2	1–3	—

Source: Danish Football Association (in Danish), Soccerway
Legend: Blue = home team win; Yellow = draw; Red = away team win.
Rules for classification: 1) Points; 2) Goal difference; 3) Goals scored; 4) Away goals scored; 5) Play-off (played on neutral ground if determining teams for different rounds); 6) Draw.

==== Results by round – Championship round ====
Matchday	1	2	3	4	5	6	7	8	9	10
Ground	H	A	H	H	A	A	H	A	H	A
Result	L	L	W	L	W	W	L	D	W	D
Position	6	6	6	6	6	6	6	6	5	5

Source: http://www.superliga.dk/
A = Away; H = Home; W = Win; D = Draw; L = Loss

==== Regular season ====
17 July 2022 1	Brøndby	1–0	AGF	Brøndbyvester
18:00 CEST	Slimane 79'	Report	Hausner (yellow card) 7'; Anderson (yellow card) 27'	Stadium: Brøndby Stadium; Attendance: 17,022; Referee: Sandi Putros

24 July 2022 2	Brøndby	1–3	Nordsjælland	Brøndbyvester
18:00 CEST	Radošević (yellow card) 41', (goal) 56' (pen.); Kvistgaarden (yellow card) 78'; Bell (yellow card) 90+5'	Report	Nuamah 3', (yellow card) 37'; Bidstrup (yellow card) 55'; Schjelderup 71'; Nygren 74'	Stadium: Brøndby Stadium; Attendance: 17,001; Referee: Jørgen Daugbjerg

31 July 2022 3	Silkeborg	2–0	Brøndby	Silkeborg
18:00 CEST	Helenius 7'; Salquist 83'; Kaalund (yellow card) 85'	Report	Hedlund (yellow card) 40'; Slimane (yellow card) 56'; Salech (yellow card) 89'	Stadium: JYSK Park; Attendance: 7,028; Referee: Mads Kristoffersen

7 August 2022 4	Copenhagen	4–1	Brøndby	Copenhagen
16:00 CEST	Khocholava 13'; Biel 32', 44', 64'; Lerager (yellow card) 43'; Zeca (yellow card) 90+5'	Report	Cappis 18'; Tshiembe (yellow card) 43'; Heggheim (yellow card) 76'; Kvistgaarden (yellow card) 88'	Stadium: Parken Stadium; Attendance: 32,630; Referee: Jakob Sundberg

14 August 2022 5	Brøndby	2–0	OB	Brøndbyvester
18:00 CEST	Radošević 12' (pen.); Schwartau 31'; Divković (yellow card) 61'; Wass (yellow card) 65'	Report	Paulsen (yellow card) 12'; King (yellow card) 43'; Þrándarson (yellow card) 69'; Mickelson (yellow card) 74'	Stadium: Brøndby Stadium; Attendance: 17,946; Referee: Jonas Hansen

21 August 2022 6	AaB	2–1	Brøndby	Aalborg
18:00 CEST	Sousa 10'; Ludewig (yellow card) 27'; Ross (yellow card) 55', (goal) 87'; Ementa (yellow card) 60'; Posavec (yellow card) 97'	Report	Kvistgaarden 58'	Stadium: Aalborg Portland Park; Attendance: 8,754; Referee: Peter Kjærsgaard

29 August 2022 7	Brøndby	0–2	Midtjylland	Brøndbyvester
19:00 CEST	Cappis (yellow card) 10'; Maxsø (yellow card) 13'; Kvistgaarden (yellow card) 43'; Slimane (yellow card) 80'; Wass (yellow card) 89'	Report	Evander 14' (pen.), (yellow card) 89'; Paulinho (yellow card) 18'; Sisto 26'; Sviatchenko (yellow card) 62'; Isaksen (yellow card) 90+4'	Stadium: Brøndby Stadium; Attendance: 16,622; Referee: Mikkel Redder

4 September 2022 8	Horsens	0–2	Brøndby	Horsens
16:00 CEST	Jensen (yellow card) 24'; Gemmer (yellow card) 60'	Report	Omoijuanfo 52'; Hedlund 63'	Stadium: CASA Arena Horsens; Attendance: 8,014; Referee: Aydin Uslu

11 September 2022 9	Brøndby	2–2	Randers	Brøndbyvester
16:00 CEST	Omoijuanfo 1'; Radošević (yellow card) 31'; Wass (yellow card) 54'; Vallys 83'	Report	Graves (yellow card) 36'; Lauenborg (yellow card) 39'; H. Andersson 45+1'; Egho (yellow card) 60'; Kopplin 90+4'	Stadium: Brøndby Stadium; Attendance: 22,325; Referee: Morten Krogh

18 September 2022 10	Viborg	0–0	Brøndby	Viborg
16:00 CEST	Grot (yellow card) 34'	Report	Gammelby (yellow card) 60'	Stadium: Energi Viborg Arena; Attendance: 8,632; Referee: Jakob Sundberg

2 October 2022 11	Brøndby	3–3	Lyngby	Brøndbyvester
16:00 CEST	Slimane 16'; Vallys 18'; Schwartau 75'; Radošević (yellow card) 81'	Report	Gytkjær 8'; Jørgensen 60'; Gregor (yellow card) 68'; Winther (yellow card) 72'; Magnússon 88'	Stadium: Brøndby Stadium; Attendance: 19,046; Referee: Jakob Kehlet

9 October 2022 12	Randers	2–3	Brøndby	Randers
18:00 CEST	H. Andersson (yellow card) 44', (goal) 45+3'; Høegh 66'	Report	Maxsø 45' (pen.); Tshiembe (yellow card) 63' (yellow-red card) 78'; Hedlund 68'; Kopplin 73' (o.g.)	Stadium: Cepheus Park Randers; Attendance: 7,134; Referee: Mads Kristoffersen

16 October 2022 13	Brøndby	1–1	Copenhagen	Brøndbyvester
14:00 CEST	Omoijuanfo 10'; Hedlund (yellow card) 38'; Rosted (yellow card) 41' (yellow-red card) 90+5'; Cappis (yellow card) 78'; Slimane (yellow card) 85'	Report	Jóhannesson (yellow card) 15'; Kristiansen (yellow card) 40'; Bardghji 90+8'	Stadium: Brøndby Stadium; Attendance: 23,245; Referee: Morten Krogh

23 October 2022 14	AGF	2–2	Brøndby	Aarhus
18:00 CEST	Duin 15'; Mortensen 79'	Report	Radošević (yellow card) 35'; Omoijuanfo 61', (yellow card) 71'; Maxsø (yellow card) 84'; Cappis 68'	Stadium: Ceres Park; Attendance: 15,219; Referee: Mikkel Redder

30 October 2022 15	Brøndby	3–2	AaB	Brøndbyvester
18:00 CEST	Gammelby 2'; Slimane 12'; Wass (yellow card) 69'; Schwartau 90+3'	Report	Bakiz 44', 64'; Ferreira (yellow card) 63'	Stadium: Brøndby Stadium; Attendance: 18,667; Referee: Jakob Kehlet

6 November 2022 16	OB	1–1	Brøndby	Odense
18:00 CEST	Tongya (yellow card) 45'; Sabbi 83'	Report	Greve (yellow card) 8'; Omoijuanfo 33'; Riveros (yellow card) 89'	Stadium: Nature Energy Park; Attendance: 14,546; Referee: Michael Tykgaard

13 November 2022 17	Brøndby	0–2	Viborg	Brøndbyvester
16:00 CEST	Maxsø (yellow card) 52'; Tshiembe (yellow card) 59'; Wass (yellow card) 63'; Slimane (yellow card) 90'	Report	Grot 24'; Achouri (yellow card) 27'; Lauritsen (yellow card) 40'; Bürgy (yellow card) 59'; Leemans 64'	Stadium: Brøndby Stadium; Attendance: 21,020; Referee: Jakob Sundberg

19 February 2023 18	Brøndby	5–2	Horsens	Brøndbyvester
18:00 CEST	Vallys 31', 75', 83'; Wass 54'; Omoijuanfo 56'	Report	Bell 40' (o.g.); Opondo 45'	Stadium: Brøndby Stadium; Attendance: 19,345; Referee: Jørgen Daugbjerg

27 February 2023 19	Midtjylland	0–1	Brøndby	Herning
19:00 CEST	Selmani (yellow card) 1'; Heiselberg (yellow card) 90+5'	Report	Hedlund (yellow card) 12'; Omoijuanfo 57'; Vallys (yellow card) 82'; Tshiembe (yellow card) 83'	Stadium: MCH Arena; Attendance: 9,865; Referee: Mikkel Redder

5 March 2023 20	Lyngby	1–0	Brøndby	Kongens Lyngby
16:00 CEST	Magnússon (yellow card) 56'; Finnbogason 64'; Chukwuani (yellow card) 80'; Gytkjær (yellow card) 85'; Kristensen (yellow card) 90+3'; Kikkenborg (yellow card) 90+5'	Report	Tshiembe (yellow card) 79'; Cappis (yellow card) 86'	Stadium: Lyngby Stadium; Attendance: 10,023; Referee: Sandi Putros

12 March 2023 21	Brøndby	2–1	Silkeborg	Brøndbyvester
18:00 CEST	Vallys 31'; Omoijuanfo 79'	Report	Jørgensen (yellow card) 37'; Sonne 66'	Stadium: Brøndby Stadium; Attendance: 19,232; Referee: Jakob Kehlet

19 March 2023 22	Nordsjælland	2–1	Brøndby	Farum
15:00 CEST	Nuamah 52', 90+1'	Report	Winther (yellow card) 3'; Vallys (yellow card) 37'; Evjen 39'; Hermansen (yellow card) 90+5'	Stadium: Right to Dream Park; Attendance: 9,551; Referee: Mads Kristoffersen

==== Championship round ====
2 April 2023 23	Brøndby	0–3	Viborg	Brøndbyvester
16:00 CEST		Report	Achouri 10'; Westergaard 71'; Paulinho 79'	Stadium: Brøndby Stadium; Attendance: 17,803; Referee: Jacob Karlsen

10 April 2023 24	Nordsjælland	2–1	Brøndby	Farum
18:00 CEST	Nuamah 12'; Frese 29', (yellow card) 90+2'; Christensen (yellow card) 49'; Hansen (yellow card) 77'	Report	Vallys (yellow card) 43'; Kvistgaarden (yellow card) 72'; Omoijuanfo 76' (pen.), (yellow card) 77'; Slimane (yellow card) 87'	Stadium: Right to Dream Park; Attendance: 6,555; Referee: Morten Krogh

16 April 2023 25	Brøndby	1–0	AGF	Brøndbyvester
18:00 CEST	Sebulonsen 37', (yellow card) 90+3'	Report	Bjur (yellow card) 86'; Daghim (yellow card) 90+1'	Stadium: Brøndby Stadium; Attendance: 16,138; Referee: Jakob Sundberg

23 April 2023 26	Brøndby	0–4	Randers	Brøndbyvester
16:00 CEST	Cappis (yellow card) 90+1'	Report	Odey 27', (yellow card) 30'; Klysner 39'; Nordli 62', 70'; Pedersen (yellow card) 74'; Enggård (yellow card) 90'	Stadium: Brøndby Stadium; Attendance: 17,113; Referee: Jakob Kehlet

30 April 2023 27	Copenhagen	0–1	Brøndby	Copenhagen
16:00 CEST	Lund (yellow card) 35'; Diks (yellow card) 87'; Jelert (yellow card) 90+3'	Report	Mensah (yellow card) 29'; Vallys (yellow card) 43'; Omoijuanfo 80'; Slimane (yellow card) 85'; Hedlund (yellow card) 90+3'; Kvistgaarden (yellow card) 90+3'	Stadium: Parken Stadium; Attendance: 35,057; Referee: Sandi Putros

7 May 2023 28	Randers	1–3	Brøndby	Randers
16:00 CEST	H. Andersson (yellow card) 28'; Odey 50'	Report	Evjen 23', (yellow card) 42'; Kvistgaarden 29', 44'; Wass (yellow card) 52'	Stadium: Cepheus Park Randers; Attendance: 7,206; Referee: Jens Maae

14 May 2023 29	Brøndby	1–3	Copenhagen	Brøndbyvester
16:00 CEST	Winther (yellow card) 25'; Omoijuanfo 57' (pen.); Wass (red card) 82'; Tshiembe (yellow card) 83'	Report	Claesson (yellow card) 3', (goal) 18'; Lund (yellow card) 17'; Ankersen (yellow card) 55'; Larsson 73'; Haraldsson (yellow card) 82'; Stamenic (yellow card) 83'; Sørensen 84'	Stadium: Brøndby Stadium; Attendance: 24,478; Referee: Mikkel Redder

21 May 2023 30	Viborg	1–1	Brøndby	Viborg
16:05 CEST	Achouri (yellow card) 13'; Leemans 81'	Report	Evjen 40'	Stadium: Energi Viborg Arena; Attendance: 9,342; Referee: Peter Kjærsgaard

29 May 2023 31	Brøndby	5–1	Nordsjælland	Brøndbyvester
18:00 CEST	Omoijuanfo 2'; Kvistgaarden 24', 49', 76'; Tshiembe (yellow card) 45+2'; Schwartau 90+3'	Report	Nuamah 72'	Stadium: Brøndby Stadium; Attendance: 19,259; Referee: Sandi Putros

4 June 2023 32	AGF	3–3	Brøndby	Aarhus
17:00 CEST	Yakob (red card) 37'; Duin 74', 85', (yellow card) 86'; Mortensen 81' (pen.)	Report	Omoijuanfo 11', (yellow card) 90+6'; Radošević 38'; Lauritsen (yellow card) 52'; Kvistgaarden 67'; Mensah (red card) 80'; Vallys (yellow card) 84'	Stadium: Ceres Park; Attendance: 19,414; Referee: Jens Maae

=== Danish Cup ===
19 October 2022 Third round	Aarhus Fremad	4–0	Brøndby	Aarhus N
14:30	From 11'; Fechtenburg 31'; Andreasen 46'; Kubel 84'	DBU Summary		Stadium: Riisvangen Stadium; Attendance: 3,892; Referee: Sandi Putros

=== UEFA Europa Conference League ===
21 July 2022 Second round 1st leg	Pogoń Szczecin (Poland)	1–1	(Denmark) Brøndby	Stadion Miejski im. Floriana Krygiera, Szczecin
18:30	Zahović 85'	Report	Riveros 28'	Attendance: 8,753; Referee: Nenad Minaković (Serbia)

28 July 2022 Second round 2nd leg	Brøndby (Denmark)	4–0 (5–1 agg.)	(Poland) Pogoń Szczecin	Brøndby Stadium, Brøndbyvester
20:00	Hedlund 17' (pen.), 33'; Kvistgaarden 52'; Divković 62'	Report		Attendance: 15,417; Referee: Alexandre Boucaut (Belgium)

4 August 2022 Third round 1st leg	Brøndby (Denmark)	1–0	(Switzerland) Basel	Brøndby Stadium, Brøndbyvester
20:30	Divković 74'	Report		Attendance: 15,015; Referee: Filip Glova (Slovakia)

11 August 2022 Third round 2nd leg	Basel (Switzerland)	2–1 (a.e.t.) (3–1 p)	(Denmark) Brøndby	St. Jakob-Park, Basel
19:15	Frei 40' (pen.); Zeqiri 45+5'	Report	Kvistgaarden 45+1'	Attendance: 20,064; Referee: Christian Dingert (Germany)
	Penalties
	Diouf (penalty scored); Ndoye (penalty scored); Szalai (penalty missed); Males (penalty scored)		(penalty missed) Radošević; (penalty missed) Salech; (penalty scored) Greve; (penalty missed) Bjur

== Statistics ==
=== Goalscorers ===
Rank	Player	Danish Superliga	Danish Cup	Europa Conference League	Total
1	(Norway) Ohi Omoijuanfo	13	0	0	13
2	(Denmark) Mathias Kvistgaarden	7	0	2	9
3	(Denmark) Nicolai Vallys	6	0	0	6
4	(Denmark) Oscar Schwartau	4	0	0	4
4	(Sweden) Simon Hedlund	2	0	2	4
6	(Norway) Håkon Evjen	3	0	0	3
6	(Tunisia) Anis Ben Slimane	3	0	0	3
6	(Croatia) Josip Radošević	3	0	0	3
9	(United States) Christian Cappis	2	0	0	2
9	(Croatia) Marko Divković	0	0	2	2
11	(Norway) Sebastian Sebulonsen	1	0	0	1
11	(Denmark) Jens Martin Gammelby	1	0	0	1
11	(Denmark) Andreas Maxsø	1	0	0	1
11	(Denmark) Daniel Wass	1	0	0	1
11	(Paraguay) Blas Riveros	0	0	1	1
Total		47	0	7	54

== Awards ==
- Danish Superliga Player of the Month (February): Nicolai Vallys
- Danish Superliga Young Player of the Month (May): Mathias Kvistgaarden
- Danish Superliga Goal of the Month (February): Ohi Omoijuanfo
- Danish Superliga Goal of the Month (May): Oscar Schwartau
