= Annisse Nord =

- Village
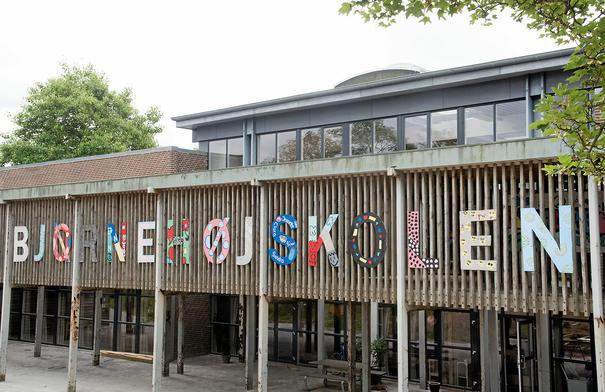

- Location within Denmark Location within Capital Region
- Coordinates: 55°59′55″N 12°11′20″E
- Country: Denmark
- Region: Capital (Hovedstaden)
- Municipality: Gribskov

Area
  - Urban: 1.16 km^{2} (0.45 sq mi)

Population (2026)
  - Urban: 1,621
  - Urban density: 1,400/km^{2} (3,620/sq mi)
- Website: annisse.dk/

Annisse Nord is a town in the Gribskov Municipality in North Zealand, Denmark. It is located two kilometers north of Annisse, three kilometers south of Helsinge and 15 kilometers northwest of Hillerød. As of 2026, it has a population of 1,621.

The Bjørnehøjskolen school is located in the town.
