= Kaick =

Brazilian footballer (born 2005)

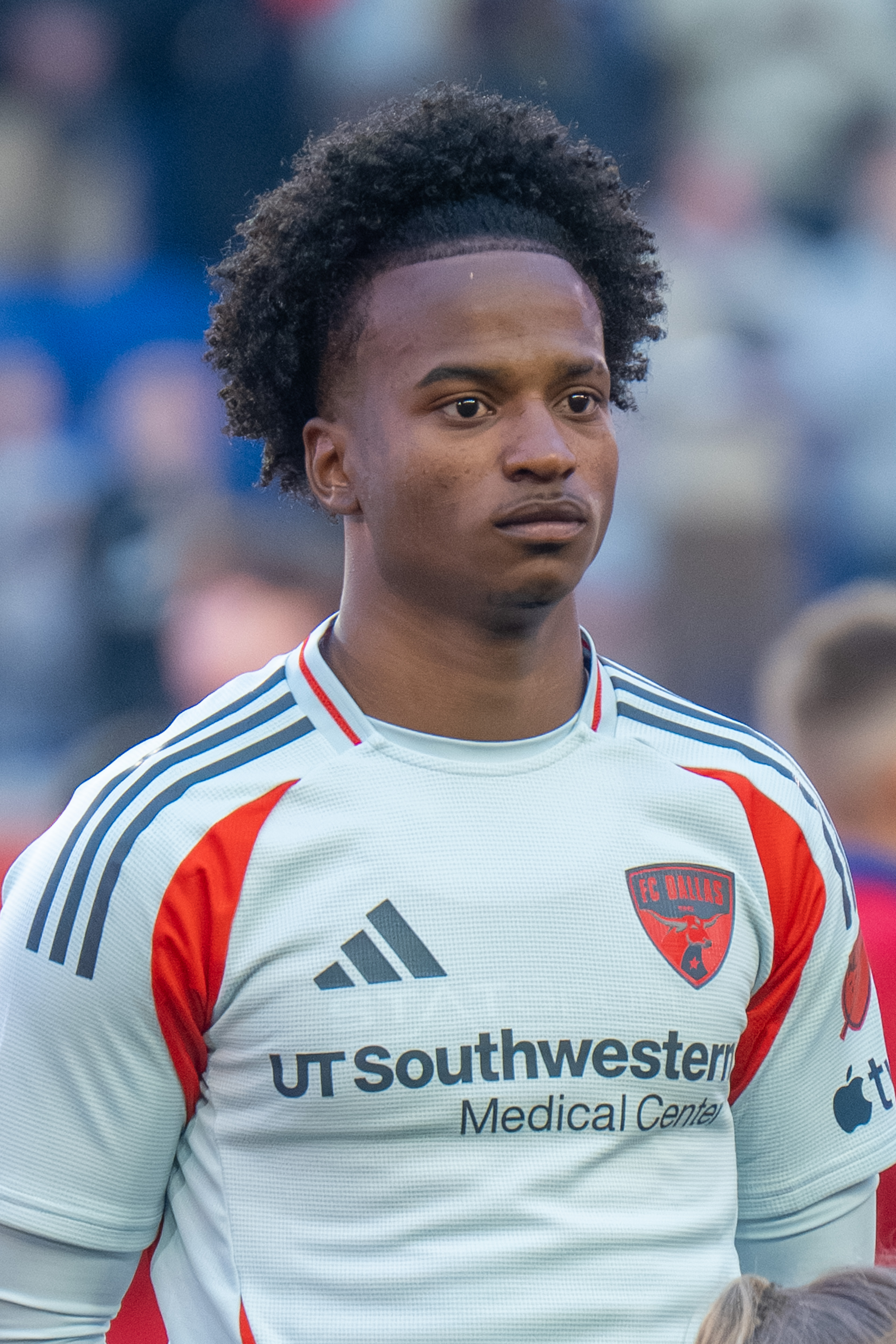
- Kaick with FC Dallas in 2026

Personal information
- Full name: Kaick da Silva Ferreira
- Date of birth: 29 November 2005 (age 20)
- Place of birth: Rio de Janeiro, Brazil
- Height: 1.75 m (5 ft 9 in)
- Position: Defensive midfielder

Team information
- Current team: FC Dallas
- Number: 55

Youth career
- 2022–2025: Grêmio

Senior career*
Years	Team	Apps	(Gls)
2025	Grêmio	1	(0)
2025–	FC Dallas	60	(7)
- * Club domestic league appearances and goals as of 22:21, 13 August 2026 (UTC)

Kaick da Silva Ferreira (born 29 November 2005), commonly known as Kaick, is a Brazilian professional footballer who plays as a defensive midfielder for FC Dallas in Major League Soccer.

== Club career ==
Kaick made his senior team debut for Grêmio in the 2025 Campeonato Gaúcho against Ypiranga on 25 February 2025, appearing as an 82nd-minute substitute. Kaick spent the majority of this time at Grêmio with their under-20 squad, scoring three goals in 33 matches from 2022 to 2025. In 2023, Kaick won the Campeonato Gaúcho under-20 title with Grêmio's U20 side. On 5 March 2025, Kaick was transferred to Major League Soccer side FC Dallas on a four-year deal for a reported fee of $4 million.
