= Christian Cappis =

American soccer player (born 1999)

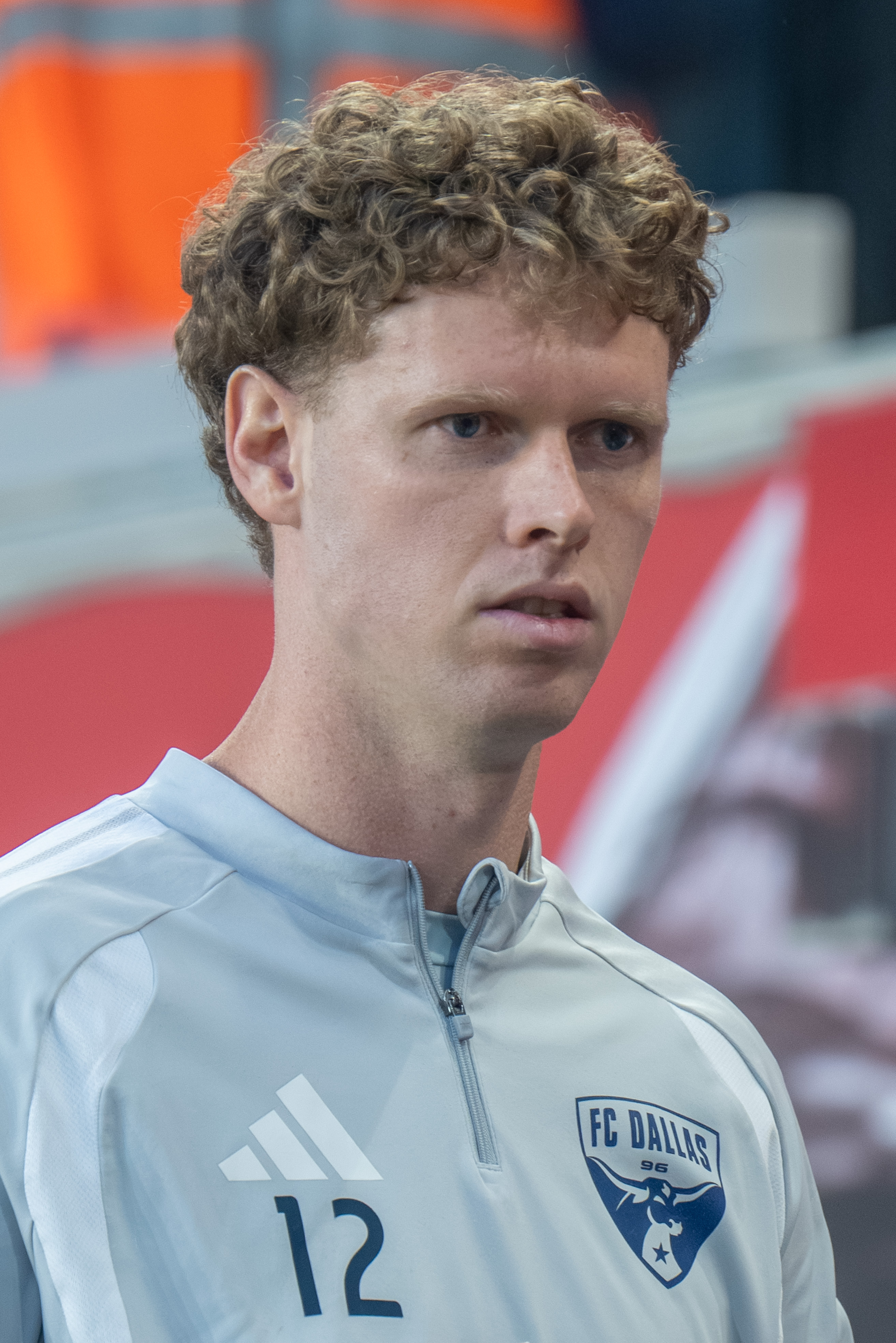
- Cappis with FC Dallas in 2026

Personal information
- Full name: Christian Jaeger Cappis
- Date of birth: August 13, 1999 (age 27)
- Place of birth: Katy, Texas, U.S.
- Height: 6 ft 1 in (1.85 m)
- Position: Central midfielder

Team information
- Current team: FC Dallas
- Number: 12

Youth career
- 2015–2017: Texans SC Houston
- 2017–2018: FC Dallas

Senior career*
Years	Team	Apps	(Gls)
2018–2021	Hobro	62	(1)
2021–2024	Brøndby	49	(6)
2023	→ Molde 2 (loan)	1	(0)
2023	→ Molde (loan)	2	(0)
2024–2025	Viking	26	(0)
2024	Viking 2	2	(0)
2025–	FC Dallas	1	(0)

International career
2019	United States U20	2	(2)
- * Club domestic league appearances and goals as of July 27, 2025

Christian Jaeger Cappis (born August 13, 1999) is an American professional soccer player who plays as a central midfielder for Major League Soccer club FC Dallas.

== Club career ==
=== FC Dallas ===
Cappis started to play soccer for academy club, Texans SC. In 2017, his club won the "2016–17 US Developmental Academy U17/18 Championship" with him being named "Central Conference Player of the Year".

As a result of his performance on this tournament, he and Chris Richards, who was also part of the team, were approached by FC Dallas's academy and in the same year, they signed with the club. After several good performances at the Dallas Academy, the club showed interest in sign him a professional contract. However, the move was prevented by MLS due to the Homegrown Player Rule which prevents academy players from signing with clubs far from their native town. As Cappis is from Greater Houston, Houston Dynamo was supposed to have priority in signing the player.

=== Hobro ===
However, instead of signing with any team on MLS, Cappis went to trial with several clubs in Europe. On November 6, 2018, he signed his first professional contract with Danish Superliga team, Hobro IK. On the same day, he debuted for the team in a match against OB at the 2018–19 Danish Cup. Cappis started the game and provided an assist in his team's 4–2 defeat, before he was replaced in the 56th minute by Edgar Babayan. On February 10, 2019, Cappis debuted in the Danish Superliga when he replaced Martin Mikkelsen at the 88th minute of a match against AC Horsens. Cappis scored his first goal on March 8, 2020, for Hobro.

At the end of the 2019–20 season, Hobro was relegated to the Danish 1st Division. In December, Hobro failed to renew Cappis' work permit and lead to Cappis' passport being revoked and at facing deportation form Denmark.

=== Brøndby ===
Cappis signed a four-year contract with Danish Superliga club Brøndby in February 2021 starting July 1, 2021. He joined the club ahead of the 2021–22 season. He made his debut against AGF on July 18, coming on as a second-half substitute for Rezan Corlu in a 1–1 draw. Cappis scored his first goal for Brøndby in a 2–2 draw against Vejle on August 1.

On September 1, 2023, Cappis joined Norwegian Eliteserien club Molde on loan for the remainder of the year. He made just four appearances, totaling 45 minutes of play, before returning to Brøndby at the end of the year.

=== Viking ===
On August 13, 2024, Cappis signed a three-and-a-half-year contract with Norwegian Eliteserien club Viking.

=== Return to FC Dallas ===
On July 24, 2025, Cappis returned to his former youth club FC Dallas, signing a contract through 2027 with an option for the 2028 season. He made his club debut the following day, appearing as a second-half substitute in a 4–3 MLS defeat to New York City FC.

== International career ==
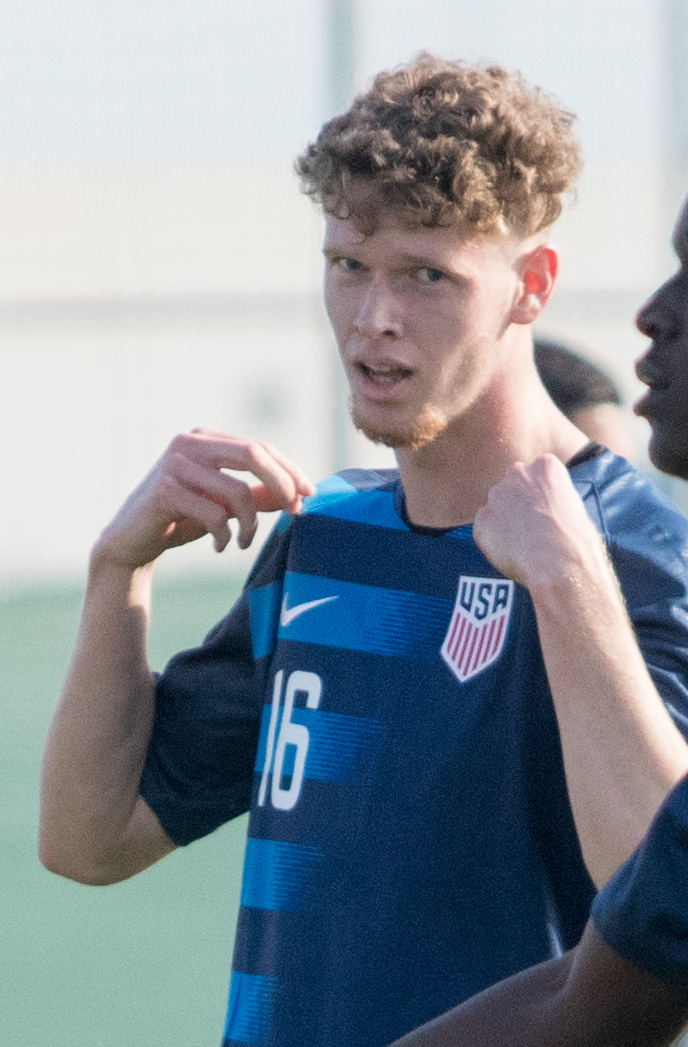
Cappis with the United States U20 in 2019

Cappis was called up to the United States senior squad in January 2020 for a friendly against Costa Rica but did not appear in the match. He received another call-up in March 2021 for two friendly matches against Jamaica and Northern Ireland, respectively, with both games taking place in Europe.

== Career statistics ==
=== Club ===
As of match played July 25, 2025

Appearances and goals by club, season and competition
Club	Season	League			National cup		Continental		Other		Total	
Club	Season	Division	Apps	Goals	Apps	Goals	Apps	Goals	Apps	Goals	Apps	Goals
Hobro IK	2018–19	Danish Superliga	3	0	1	0	—		4 (Note: Appearances in Danish Superliga play-offs)	0	8	0
Hobro IK	2019–20	Danish Superliga	30	1	1	0	—		—		31	1
Hobro IK	2020–21	Danish 1st Division	25	0	0	0	—		—		25	0
Hobro IK	Total		58	1	2	0	0	0	4	0	64	1
Brøndby IF	2021–22	Danish Superliga	27	4	4	2	6 (Note: Appearances in UEFA Europa League)	0	—		37	6
Brøndby IF	2022–23	Danish Superliga	19	2	1	0	4 (Note: Appearance(s) in UEFA Conference League)	0	—		24	2
Brøndby IF	2023–24	Danish Superliga	2	0	0	0	—		—		2	0
Brøndby IF	2024–25	Danish Superliga	1	0	0	0	1	0	—		2	0
Brøndby IF	Total		49	6	5	2	11	0	0	0	65	8
Molde 2 (loan)	2023	Norwegian Third Division	1	0	—		—		—		1	0
Molde (loan)	2023	Eliteserien	2	0	0	0	2	0	—		4	0
Viking	2024	Eliteserien	12	0	0	0	—		—		12	0
Viking	2025	Eliteserien	14	0	4	1	—		—		18	1
Viking	Total		26	0	4	1	—		—		30	1
Viking 2	2024	Norwegian Second Division	2	0	—		—		—		2	0
FC Dallas	2025	MLS	1	0	—		—		—		1	0
Career total			139	7	11	3	13	0	4	0	167	10
