= Anders Hagelskjær =

Danish footballer (born 1997)

- Hagelskjær in 2026

Personal information
- Full name: Anders Hagelskjær
- Date of birth: 16 February 1997 (age 29)
- Place of birth: Bernstorffsminde, Denmark
- Height: 1.92 m (6 ft 4 in)
- Position: Centre-back

Team information
- Current team: Wycombe Wanderers
- Number: 45

Youth career
- Midtjylland

Senior career*
Years	Team	Apps	(Gls)
2017	Midtjylland	0	(0)
2017	→ Skive (loan)	13	(0)
2017–2018	Skive	29	(0)
2018–2021	Silkeborg	65	(3)
2021–2023	AaB	32	(2)
2022	→ Sarpsborg 08 (loan)	10	(0)
2023–2025	Molde	40	(1)
2025–	Wycombe Wanderers	5	(0)

International career
2015	Denmark U18	1	(0)
- * Club domestic league appearances and goals as of 4 December 2024

Anders Hagelskjær (born 16 February 1997) is a Danish professional footballer who plays for EFL League One Club Wycombe Wanderers.

== Career ==
On 9 January 2025, Hagelskjær signed for EFL League One side Wycombe Wanderers.

== Career statistics ==
As of 10 January 2025

Appearances and goals by club, season and competition
Club	Season	League			National cup (Note: Includes Danish Cup, Norwegian Cup)		Europe		Total	
Club	Season	Division	Apps	Goals	Apps	Goals	Apps	Goals	Apps	Goals
Skive	2016-17	1. Division	13	0	0	0	—		13	0
Skive	2017-18	NordicBet Liga	29	0	0	0	—		29	0
Skive	Total		42	0	0	0	—		42	0
Silkeborg	2018-19	NordicBet Liga	31	1	0	0	—		31	1
Silkeborg	2019-20	Danish Superliga	24	2	2	0	—		26	2
Silkeborg	2020-21	NordicBet Liga	19	0	0	0	—		19	0
Silkeborg	Total		74	3	2	0	—		76	3
AaB	2021-22	Danish Superliga	29	1	3	1	—		32	2
AaB	2022-23	Danish Superliga	3	1	0	0	—		3	1
AaB	Total		32	2	3	1	—		35	3
Sarpsborg 08 (loan)	2022	Eliteserien	10	0	0	0	—		10	0
Molde	2023	Eliteserien	21	0	8	0	8 (Note: Four appearances in UEFA Champions League, four appearances in UEFA Europa League)	0	37	0
Molde	2024	Eliteserien	19	0	2	1	14 (Note: Appearances in UEFA Europa Conference League)	0	35	1
Molde	Total		40	0	10	1	22	0	72	1
Career total			198	5	15	2	22	0	235	7

== Honours ==
Silkeborg

- NordicBet Liga: 2018-19

Molde

- Norwegian Cup: 2023
