= Lukas Klitten =

Danish footballer (born 2000)

Personal information
- Full name: Lukas Sparre Klitten
- Date of birth: 1 May 2000 (age 26)
- Place of birth: Aalborg, Denmark
- Height: 1.93 m (6 ft 4 in)
- Position: Left-back

Team information
- Current team: Hobro
- Number: 27

Youth career
- Skalborg Sportsklub
- AaB

Senior career*
Years	Team	Apps	(Gls)
2019–2021	AaB	28	(0)
2021–2023	Frosinone	0	(0)
2022–2023	→ Silkeborg (loan)	9	(0)
2023–	Hobro	88	(5)

International career
2017	Denmark U17	3	(0)
2017–2018	Denmark U18	7	(1)
2018–2019	Denmark U19	19	(2)
2020	Denmark U21	6	(0)
- * Club domestic league appearances and goals as of 2 June 2026

Lukas Sparre Klitten (born 1 May 2000) is a Danish professional footballer who plays as a left-back for Hobro IK.

== Club career ==
=== AaB ===
On 20 September 2017, Klitten got his debut for the first team of AaB, where he came on the pitch from the bench with two minutes left for the final whistle. Klitten also sat on the bench in the Danish Superliga two times in that season. In the winter 2018, Klitten also participated in the first team training camp in Spain alongside his twin brother Oliver Klitten.

Klitten got his Danish Superliga debut for AaB on 22 April 2019, in a match against Randers FC. Klitten played the whole 90 minutes of the game, and was also noted for an assist in the game, which they won 2–0.

Klitten and his twin brother, Oliver, was promoted to the first team squad for the 2019–20 season. In April 2021, Klitten revealed to the media, that he would like to leave the club because he felt that AaB didn't believe in him. On 21 May 2021 it was confirmed, that he would leave the club on 30 June 2021, as his contract expired.

=== Frosinone ===
On 18 June 2021, Klitten signed a four-year deal with Italian Serie B club Frosinone. In his first six months at his new club, Klitten failed to make a single first-team appearance instead playing sparingly for the U19s in Campionato Primavera 2.

On 4 July 2022, Klitten returned to his homeland, when he signes a one-year loan deal with Danish Superliga club Silkeborg IF. Klitten left Silkeborg at the end of the season, with a total of 13 appearances. His contract with Frosinone was terminated by mutual consent on 31 August 2023.

=== Hobro IK ===
On 1 September 2023, Klitten signed with Hobro IK, joining his twin brother Oliver.

== Personal life ==
Lukas' twin brother, Oliver Klitten, is also a professional football player.
