= Anosike Ementa =

Danish footballer (born 2002)

Personal information
- Full name: Anosike Victor Ementa
- Date of birth: 3 May 2002 (age 24)
- Place of birth: Annisse, Denmark
- Height: 2.02 m (6 ft 8 in)
- Position: Forward

Team information
- Current team: Zulte Waregem
- Number: 18

Youth career
- Annisse IF
- Helsingør
- 2021–2022: AaB

Senior career*
Years	Team	Apps	(Gls)
2020–2021	Helsingør	3	(0)
2021–2023	AaB	33	(0)
2023–2025	Viborg	62	(12)
2025–	Zulte Waregem	40	(5)
- * Club domestic league appearances and goals as of 12:51, 21 October 2026 (UTC)

Anosike Victor Ementa (born 3 May 2002) is a Danish professional footballer who plays as a forward for Belgian Pro League club Zulte Waregem.

== Early life and career ==
The son of a Danish mother and a Nigerian father, Ementa grew up in Annisse, Gribskov Municipality. Brought up by his Danish mother alongside two siblings, Ementa's father returned to Nigeria when he was around six or seven years old. His father had limited involvement in their upbringing and Ementa has minimal contact with him. While he has expressed curiosity about visiting Nigeria, he feels a stronger connection to his Danish identity and aspires to represent the Denmark national team. He grew up a fan of Dennis Bergkamp and West Ham United.

== Career ==
=== Helsingør ===
Ementa started playing football at local club Annisse IF at youth level, before transitioning to FC Helsingør's youth academy. He was initially positioned as a defensive midfielder before changing position to forward.

Ementa already made his debut in the Danish reserve league at the age of 15 against the reserve team of Copenhagen in August 2017. In November 2019, Ementa signed a new contract with Helsingør. He made his official debut for the club on 4 July 2020 in a Danish 2nd Division promotion play-off match against Jammerbugt.

Helsingør was promoted to the Danish 1st Division for the 2020–21 season. Ementa made two appearances in December 2020 before leaving.

=== AaB ===
On 27 January 2021 Danish Superliga club AaB confirmed, that they had signed Ementa on a deal until the end of 2023. Ementa was initially to be intended for a role on the club's under-19 team. However, he did not manage to make his debut for the under-19 team in his first season, after he in April 2021 had to undergo surgery for a fatigue fracture in his little toe.

Still, in the June 2021, he was promoted to the first team squad. On 22 November 2021, Ementa made his official debut for AaB against SønderjyskE in the Danish Superliga. Ementa came on the pitch 89th minute and managed to make the assist for AaB's last goal.

=== Viborg ===
On 10 July 2023, Ementa signed a three-year contract with Viborg.

=== Zulte Waregem ===
On 7 August 2025, Ementa was sold to Belgian Pro League club Zulte Waregem, signing a deal until June 2028 with an option for one further year.

== Personal life ==
Born in Denmark, Ementa is of Nigerian descent.

== Career statistics ==
As of match played on 4 April 2026

Club statistics
Club	Season	League			National Cup		Other		Total	
Club	Season	Division	Apps	Goals	Apps	Goals	Apps	Goals	Apps	Goals
FC Helsingør	2019–20	Danish 2nd Divisions	1	0	0	0	—		1	0
FC Helsingør	2020–21	Danish 1st Division	2	0	0	0	—		2	0
FC Helsingør	Total		3	0	0	0	0	0	3	0
AaB	2021–22	Danish Superliga	13	0	0	0	1 (Note: Appearance in the 2021–22 Danish Superliga European play-offs)	0	14	0
AaB	2022–23	Danish Superliga	20	0	3	0	—		23	0
AaB	Total		33	0	3	0	1	0	37	0
Viborg	2023–24	Danish Superliga	31	8	2	1	—		33	9
Viborg	2024–25	Danish Superliga	28	3	7	1	—		35	4
Viborg	2025–26	Danish Superliga	3	1	0	0	—		3	1
Viborg	Total		62	12	9	2	0	0	71	14
Zulte Waregem	2025–26	Belgian Pro League	27	3	1	0	—		28	3
Career totals			125	15	12	2	1	0	139	17

== Honours ==
Individual

- Danish Superliga Team of the Month: March 2024
