= Casper Gedsted =

Danish footballer (born 2002)

Personal information
- Full name: Casper Gedsted Hansen
- Date of birth: 4 February 2002 (age 24)
- Place of birth: Farsø, Denmark
- Position: Right-back

Team information
- Current team: 07 Vestur
- Number: 11

Youth career
- Farsø/Ullits IK
- AaB

Senior career*
Years	Team	Apps	(Gls)
2021–2022	AaB	6	(0)
2022	Krasava Ypsonas	13	(0)
2023–2024	HB Køge	20	(0)
2025–	07 Vestur	51	(8)

International career
2017–2018	Denmark U16	7	(0)
2018	Denmark U17	4	(0)
- * Club domestic league appearances and goals as of 1 November 2026

Casper Gedsted Hansen (born 4 February 2002) is a Danish professional footballer, who plays as a right-back for Faroese club 07 Vestur.

== Career ==
=== AaB ===
Born in Farsø, Gedsted started his career at Farsø/Ullits IK, before moving to AaB at the age of 13. In the summer 2021, Gedsted was promoted to the first team squad, after signing a professional five-year deal with the club.

On 31 August 2021, Gedsted got his official debut for the club in a Danish Cup game against FIUK, which Gedsted and co. won 13–0. On 20 March 2022, Gedsted got his debut in the Danish Superliga against Brøndby IF.

On 25 May 2022 AaB confirmed, that Gedsted's contract had been terminated by mutual consent, with following message: We made a long deal with Casper last year because we saw and still see potential in him. However, Casper has expressed impatience for more playing time, which we can't promise, and therefore we've agreed that the best solution right now is to terminate the agreement.

On 17 July 2022 it was reported, that Gedsted would go on a trial at Dutch Eerste Divisie club VVV-Venlo.

=== Ypsonas ===
On 17 August 2022 it was confirmed, that Gedsted had joined newly promoted Cypriot Second Division side Krasava Ypsonas. He got his debut for the club on 10 September 2022 against MEAP Nisou. He made a total of 13 appearances for the club, before returning to Denmark.

=== HB Køge ===
On 18 January 2023, Gedsted returned to Denmark, signing with Danish 1st Division side HB Køge, signing a deal until June 2024.

On 24 May 2024 Køge confirmed that Gedsted left the club at the end of the season.

=== Later clubs ===
In January 2025, Gedsted joined Faroese club 07 Vestur.
