= Robert Kakeeto =

Ugandan footballer (born 1995)

Personal information
- Date of birth: 19 May 1995 (age 31)
- Place of birth: Kampala, Uganda
- Height: 1.77 m (5 ft 10 in)
- Position: Midfielder

Team information
- Current team: Middelfart
- Number: 6

Youth career
- 2013–2015: Nordjyllands Idrætshøjskole

Senior career*
Years	Team	Apps	(Gls)
2015–2023	AaB	37	(0)
2018–2019	→ Jammerbugt (loan)	10	(0)
2019	→ HIFK (loan)	6	(0)
2021–2022	→ Skive (loan)	19	(0)
2022–2023	→ Middelfart (loan)	30	(2)
2023–	Middelfart	90	(1)

International career^{‡}
2017	Uganda	2	(0)
- * Club domestic league appearances and goals as of 20:35, 3 October 2026 (UTC) ‡ National team caps and goals as of 01:03, 25 September 2017 (UTC)

Robert Kakeeto (born 19 May 1995) is a Ugandan international professional footballer who plays as a midfielder for Danish 2nd Division club Middelfart.

== Club career ==
Kakeeto moved from Uganda to Denmark in 2013 to play for Nordjyllands Idrætshøjskole. In September 2015 he signed a contract until June 2018 with AaB.

Kakeeto was loaned out on 31 August 2018 to Jammerbugt FC in the Danish 2nd Division for the rest of the season.

On 13 August 2019, Kakeeto was loaned out to Finnish club HIFK until the end of November. On 31 August 2021, he was loaned out again, this time to Danish 2nd Division club Skive for the rest of the 2021–22 season. On 27 July 2022, he was once again loaned out, to Middelfart Boldklub for the upcoming season.

At the end of the 2022-23 season, Kakeeto left AaB as his contract expired. On 13 July 2023, he signed a permanent deal with Middelfart.

== International career ==
He made his international debut for Uganda on 2 June 2017, in a friendly match against Ethiopia.
