= Mads Lauritsen =

Danish footballer (born 1993)

Personal information
- Date of birth: 14 April 1993 (age 33)
- Place of birth: Holstebro, Denmark
- Height: 1.95 m (6 ft 5 in)
- Position: Centre-back

Youth career
- 1998–2005: Mejdal-Halgård Fodbold
- 2005–2008: Holstebro BK
- 2008–2012: Viborg

Senior career*
Years	Team	Apps	(Gls)
2012–2013	Viborg FF	1	(0)
2013–2017	Thisted	5	(1)
2018–2021	Vejle	37	(2)
2020–2021	→ Viborg (loan)	31	(2)
2021–2024	Viborg	40	(4)
- * Club domestic league appearances and goals

Mads Lauritsen (born 14 April 1993) is a Danish former professional footballer who played as a centre-back.

== Career ==
Lauritsen joined Vejle from Thisted in the summer of 2017. In May 2019, he signed a new contract with Vejle through the summer of 2021.

On 24 August 2020, Lauritsen returned to Viborg on a loan deal until the end of the season. On 22 February 2021, he signed a permanent deal with Viborg until June 2022.

Lauritsen announced his retirement from football on 9 May 2024. He attributed the decision due to a history of injuries.

== Honours ==
Viborg

- Danish 1st Division: 2020–21
