= Louka Prip =

Danish footballer (born 1997)

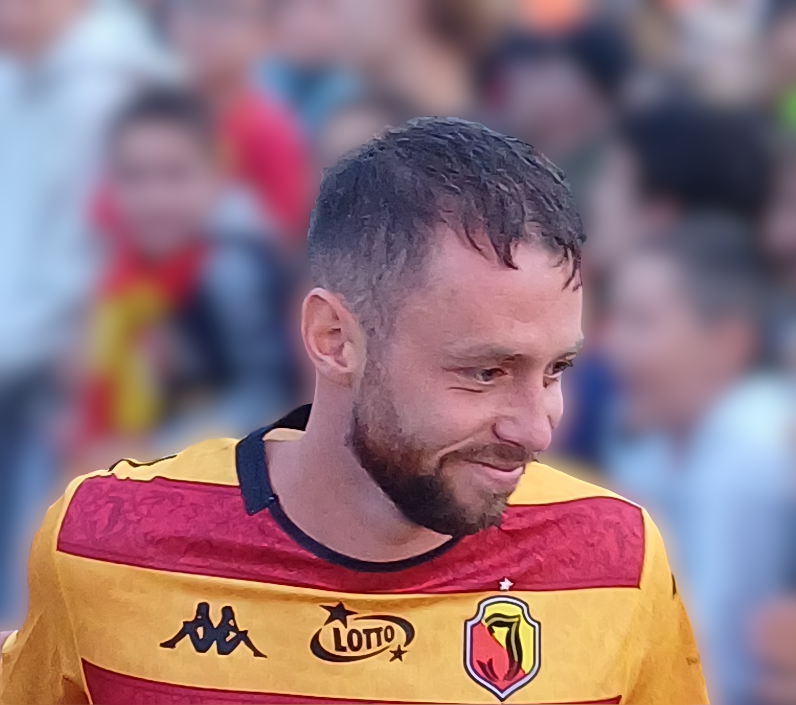
- Prip with Jagiellonia Białystok in 2025

Personal information
- Full name: Louka Daniel Prip Andreasen
- Date of birth: 29 June 1997 (age 29)
- Place of birth: Hvidovre, Denmark
- Height: 1.82 m (6 ft 0 in)
- Position: Winger

Team information
- Current team: Hvidovre
- Number: 7

Youth career
- Avarta
- Brøndby
- Hvidovre

Senior career*
Years	Team	Apps	(Gls)
2015–2019	Hvidovre	77	(15)
2019–2021	Horsens	77	(13)
2021–2023	AaB	68	(15)
2023–2025	Konyaspor	56	(7)
2025–2026	Jagiellonia Białystok	8	(0)
2026–	Hvidovre	14	(2)
- * Club domestic league appearances and goals as of 2 June 2026

Louka Daniel Prip Andreasen (born 29 June 1997) is a Danish professional footballer who plays as a winger for Danish 1st Division club Hvidovre.

== Career ==
On 3 June 2015, Prip made his debut for Hvidovre against Avedøre at the age of 17. He was on a trial at Danish Superliga club AaB in November 2017, but a move never materialised.

On 14 January 2019, AC Horsens announced the signing of Prip on a contract until 31 December 2022. Prip made his debut for Horsens on 10 February 2019 in a match against Hobro IK, replacing Thomas Kortegaard in the 57th minute.

After playing for AaB, he signed for Turkish club Konyaspor in August 2023.

On 30 June 2025, Polish club Jagiellonia Białystok signed Prip to a two-year contract, with a one-year option.

On 27 January 2026, he returned to his boyhood club Hvidovre.
