= Pedro Ferreira (footballer, born 1998) =

Portuguese footballer (born 1998)

Personal information
- Full name: Pedro Miguel Dinis Ferreira
- Date of birth: 5 January 1998 (age 28)
- Place of birth: Marinha Grande, Portugal
- Height: 1.83 m (6 ft 0 in)
- Position: Midfielder

Team information
- Current team: Santa Clara
- Number: 8

Youth career
- 2006–2010: Vieirense
- 2010–2011: União de Leiria
- 2011–2017: Sporting

Senior career*
Years	Team	Apps	(Gls)
2017–2019	Sporting CP	0	(0)
2018–2019	→ Mafra (loan)	29	(0)
2019–2020	Varzim	19	(0)
2020–2024	AaB	82	(5)
2024–	Santa Clara	85	(1)

International career
2013	Portugal U15	2	(0)
2013–2014	Portugal U16	13	(1)
2014–2015	Portugal U17	17	(2)
2015–2016	Portugal U18	6	(0)
- * Club domestic league appearances and goals as of 20 September 2026

Pedro Miguel Dinis Ferreira (born 5 January 1998) is a Portuguese professional footballer who plays as a midfielder for Primeira Liga club Santa Clara.

== Club career ==
=== Sporting CP ===
Born in Marinha Grande, Leiria District, Ferreira developed at Vieirense and União de Leiria before joining the ranks of Sporting CP in 2011. In July 2018, having not made a senior appearance for Sporting or their reserves, he joined LigaPro club Mafra on a season-long loan. He made his debut on 12 August in a 1–0 win at Varzim as a 76th-minute substitute for Bruninho. He played 29 times for the team from Lisbon District, split almost evenly between starts and appearances from the bench.

=== Varzim ===
In July 2019, Ferreira cancelled his Sporting contract to enable him to sign for Varzim on a free transfer. His previous employers retained 50% of his economic rights, however.

=== AaB ===
Ferreira joined Danish Superliga club AaB on 19 August 2020, signing a four-year deal. He made his debut on 13 September, on the first matchday of the 2020–21 season, in a 0–0 draw against Lyngby Boldklub.

He scored his first two professional goals on 12 September 2021 in a league game against Viborg FF, helping his team to a 3–2 away win.

=== Santa Clara ===
On 3 January 2024, Ferreira returned to Portugal, signing a contract until June 2026 with Liga Portugal 2 club Santa Clara.

== Career statistics ==
As of match played 20 September 2026

Appearances and goals by club, season and competition
Club	Season	League			Cup		League cup		Other		Total	
Club	Season	Division	Apps	Goals	Apps	Goals	Apps	Goals	Apps	Goals	Apps	Goals
Sporting CP	2017–18	Primeira Liga	0	0	0	0	0	0	0	0	0	0
Mafra (loan)	2018–19	Liga Portugal 2	29	0	0	0	0	0	—		29	0
Varzim	2019–20	Liga Portugal 2	19	0	4	0	0	0	—		23	0
AaB	2020–21	Danish Superliga	28	0	1	0	—		1 (Note: Appearances in Danish Superliga play-offs)	0	30	0
AaB	2021–22	Danish Superliga	17	2	2	0	—		—		19	2
AaB	2022–23	Danish Superliga	27	2	6	0	—		—		33	2
AaB	2023–24	Danish 1st Division	10	1	3	0	—		—		13	1
AaB	Total		82	5	12	0	—		1	0	95	5
Santa Clara	2023–24	Liga Portugal 2	16	1	1	0	0	0	—		17	1
Santa Clara	2024–25	Primeira Liga	32	0	2	0	1	0	—		36	0
Santa Clara	2025–26	Primeira Liga	30	0	3	0	1	0	6 (Note: Appearances in UEFA Conference League)	0	40	0
Santa Clara	2026–27	Primeira Liga	7	0	0	0	0	0	—		7	0
Santa Clara	Total		85	1	6	0	2	0	6	0	99	1
Career total			215	6	22	0	2	0	7	0	247	5
