= Annisse =

- Village
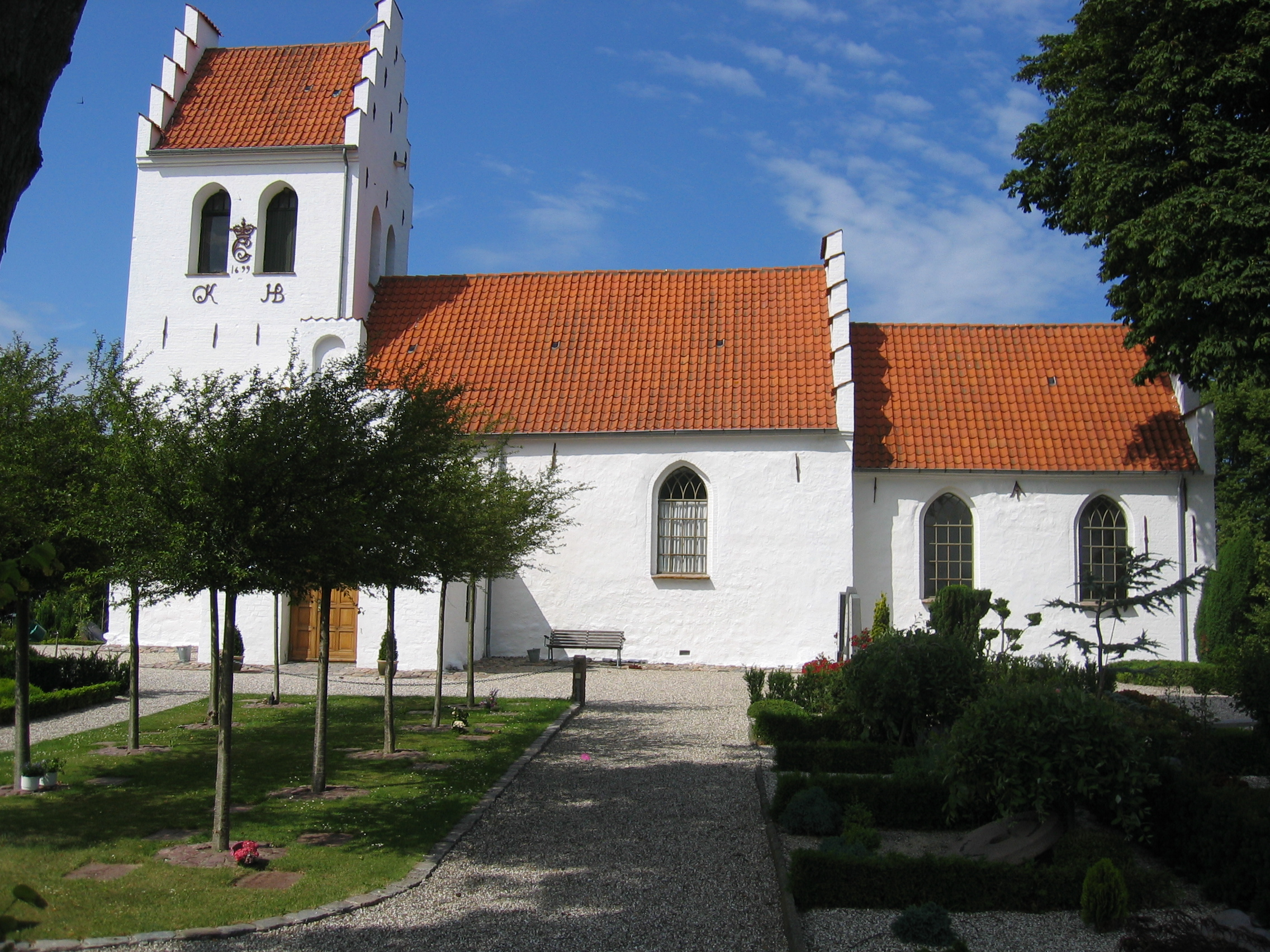
- Annisse Church

- Location within Denmark Location within Capital Region
- Coordinates: 55°58′55″N 12°10′22″E
- Country: Denmark
- Region: Capital (Hovedstaden)
- Municipality: Gribskov

Population (2026)
  - Urban: 313
- Website: annisse.dk/

Annisse is a town in the Gribskov Municipality in North Zealand, Denmark. It is located five kilometers south of Helsinge and 13 kilometers northwest of Hillerød. As of 2026, it has a population of 313.

The sports club Annisse IF is based in the town.
