= Malthe Højholt =

Danish footballer (born 2001)

Personal information
- Date of birth: 16 April 2001 (age 25)
- Place of birth: Hjørring, Denmark
- Height: 1.82 m (6 ft 0 in)
- Position: Midfielder

Team information
- Current team: Górnik Zabrze
- Number: 8

Youth career
- Hjørring IF
- 2013–2020: AaB

Senior career*
Years	Team	Apps	(Gls)
2020–2024	AaB	105	(1)
2024–2026	Pisa	47	(0)
2026–	Górnik Zabrze	0	(0)

International career
2018	Denmark U17	2	(0)
2018–2019	Denmark U18	5	(0)
2020	Denmark U19	2	(0)
- * Club domestic league appearances and goals as of 25 May 2026

Malthe Højholt (born 16 April 2001) is a Danish professional footballer who plays as a midfielder for Ekstraklasa club Górnik Zabrze.

== Club career ==
Højholt was born in Hjørring, Denmark, and progressed through the youth teams of Hjørring IF before joining the AaB academy at under-13 level. He made his Danish Superliga debut for AaB on 20 June 2020 in a game against FC Nordsjælland.

On 13 August 2024, Højholt moved to Serie B side Pisa on a long-term deal.

On 2 September 2026, Højholt joined Polish club Górnik Zabrze on a three-year contract, for an undisclosed fee.
