= 2025–26 Silkeborg IF season =

Danish football club season

Silkeborg
2025–26 season
- Owner: Trivela Group
- Chairman: Kent Madsen
- Manager: Kent Nielsen
- Stadium: JYSK Park
- Danish Superliga: 9th
- Danish Cup: Fourth round
- UEFA Conference League: Third qualifying round
- Top goalscorer: League: Tonni Adamsen (14); All: Tonni Adamsen (19)
- Highest home attendance: 6,879 v Copenhagen (10 May 2026, Superliga)
- Lowest home attendance: 2,733 v Viborg (8 February 2026, Superliga)
- Average home league attendance: 4,568
- Biggest win: 5–0 v Kolding Boldklub (17 September 2025, Danish Cup)
- Biggest defeat: 0–7 v Copenhagen (5 April 2026, Superliga)
Home colours	Away colours	Third colours

The 2025–26 season was the 109th season in the history of Silkeborg Idrætsforening and the club's fifth consecutive season in the top flight of Danish football. In addition to the domestic league, the team participated in the Danish Cup, as well as the UEFA Conference League qualifying phase.

== First‑team squad ==
As of 19 February 2026

No.	Player	Position	Nationality	Date of birth (age)	Signed from	Date signed	Fee	Contract end
Goalkeepers
1	Nicolai Larsen (C)	GK	(Denmark)	9 March 1991 (age 35)	(France) Guingamp	1 July 2021	Undisclosed	2026
16	Bastian Holm	GK	(Denmark)	13 February 2005 (age 21)	Academy	1 July 2025	—N/a	2026
30	Aske Andrésen	GK	(Denmark)	12 July 2005 (age 21)	Academy	1 July 2023	—N/a	2029
Defenders
2	Andreas Poulsen	LB	(Denmark)	13 October 1999 (age 27)	AaB	1 July 2024	Undisclosed	2027
3	Robin Østrøm	RB / CB	(Norway)	9 August 2002 (age 24)	OB	23 August 2022	Undisclosed	2028
4	Pedro Ganchas	CB	(Portugal)	31 May 2000 (age 26)	(Portugal) Paços de Ferreira	2 July 2024	€400k	2028
15	Melker Jonsson	CB	(Sweden)	10 September 2002 (age 24)	(Sweden) Landskrona BoIS	29 January 2026	Free transfer	2026
19	Jens Martin Gammelby	RB	(Denmark)	5 February 1995 (age 31)	(Norway) HamKam	1 January 2024	€100k	2026
24	Alexander Priesborg Madsen	CB	(Denmark)	14 May 2005 (age 21)	Academy	1 July 2024	—N/a	2028
25	Pontus Rödin	CB	(Sweden)	16 August 2000 (age 26)	(Sweden) Brage	29 January 2024	€200k	2027
28	Simon Stüker	RB	(Denmark)	23 April 2007 (age 19)	Academy	1 July 2025	—N/a	2027
40	Alexander Busch	CB	(Denmark)	25 July 2003 (age 23)	Academy	15 January 2024	—N/a	2027
Midfielders
6	Adam Wikman	CM	(Sweden)	15 December 2003 (age 22)	(Sweden) IK Sirius	16 January 2026	Loan	2026
7	Villads Westh	CM	(Denmark)	25 April 2004 (age 22)	Kolding IF	1 September 2025	Undisclosed	2029
8	Jeppe Andersen	CM	(Denmark)	6 December 1992 (age 33)	(Norway) Sarpsborg 08	18 July 2024	Undisclosed	2026
14	Sofus Berger	CM	(Denmark)	2 June 2003 (age 23)	Viborg	1 February 2025	€300k	2028
20	Mads Larsen	CM	(Denmark)	20 September 2001 (age 25)	Esbjerg fB	17 January 2024	€135k	2027
22	Rami Al Hajj	AM	(Sweden)	17 September 2001 (age 25)	(England) Plymouth Argyle	11 July 2025	Undisclosed	2029
26	Mikkel Øxenberg	DM	(Denmark)	25 January 2007 (age 19)	Academy	1 July 2025	—N/a	2030
27	William Kirk	AM	(Denmark)	13 January 2007 (age 19)	Academy	1 January 2026	—N/a	?
33	Mads Freundlich	CM	(Denmark)	25 March 2003 (age 23)	Hobro	16 July 2024	€535k	2029
36	Julius Lorents	CM	(Denmark)	26 April 2006 (age 20)	Academy	1 July 2025	—N/a	2029
Forwards
9	Alexander Simmelhack	CF	(Denmark)	9 November 2005 (age 21)	Copenhagen	21 August 2024	€350k	2027
10	Younes Bakiz	LW	(Denmark)	5 February 1999 (age 27)	AaB	1 July 2024	€400k	2028
11	Oliver Ross	LW / CF / AM	(Denmark)	10 October 2004 (age 22)	AaB	2 February 2026	Undisclosed	2029
17	Callum McCowatt	RW	(New Zealand)	30 April 1999 (age 27)	Helsingør	4 July 2023	€269k	2027
23	Tonni Adamsen	ST	(Denmark)	15 November 1994 (age 31)	Helsingør	6 August 2022	€200k	2026

== Transfers ==
=== In ===
Pos.	Player	Transferred from	Fee	Date	Source
DF	(Denmark) Oscar Fuglsang	(Denmark) Fredericia	Loan return	30 June 2025	
FW	(Denmark) Asbjørn Bøndergaard	(Denmark) Fredericia	Loan return	30 June 2025	
DF	(Denmark) Leonel Montano	(Denmark) Esbjerg fB	Free transfer	1 July 2025	
MF	(Sweden) Rami Al Hajj	(England) Plymouth Argyle	Undisclosed	11 July 2025	
MF	(Denmark) Villads Westh	(Denmark) Kolding IF	Undisclosed	1 September 2025	
DF	(Denmark) Benjamin Clemmensen	(Denmark) Vendsyssel	Loan	1 September 2025	
MF	(Sweden) Adam Wikman	(Sweden) IK Sirius	Loan	16 January 2026	
DF	(Sweden) Melker Jonsson	(Sweden) Landskrona BoIS	Free transfer	29 January 2026	
FW	(Denmark) Oliver Ross	(Denmark) AaB	Undisclosed	2 February 2026	

=== Out ===
Pos.	Player	Transferred to	Fee	Date	Source
DF	(Denmark) Oscar Fuglsang	Retired	N/A	1 July 2025	
MF	(Kazakhstan) Ramazan Orazov	(Kazakhstan) Yelimay	Loan	9 July 2025	
MF	(Denmark) Anders Klynge	(Norway) Bodø/Glimt	Free transfer	12 July 2025	
MF	(Denmark) Fredrik Carlsen	(Germany) FC Ingolstadt	Undisclosed	24 July 2025	
MF	(Denmark) Pelle Mattsson	(England) Norwich City	Undisclosed	29 August 2025	
MF	(Kazakhstan) Ramazan Orazov	(Kazakhstan) Yelimay	Undisclosed	13 December 2025	
DF	(Denmark) Benjamin Clemmensen	(Denmark) Vendsyssel	End of loan	31 December 2025	
MF	(Denmark) Oskar Boesen	(Norway) Stabæk	Loan	20 January 2026	
FW	(Denmark) Asbjørn Bøndergaard	(Denmark) Lyngby	Undisclosed	21 January 2026	
FW	(Denmark) Sebastian Biller	(Norway) Hødd	Loan	30 January 2026	
DF	(Denmark) Leonel Montano	(Finland) HJK	Loan	19 February 2026	
GK	(Denmark) Nicolai Larsen	(Denmark) Vejle	Undisclosed	19 May 2026	

== Pre-season and friendlies ==
The pre-season schedule was announced by the club on 4 June 2025. The dates of three more training matches were revealed on 25 June. On 11 July, an additional friendly match at JYSK Park against Danish 2nd Division club Thisted was added to the pre-season schedule. On 8 October, it was announced that a training match against Kolding IF would take place on 9 October, during the international break. On 15 December, three friendly matches were scheduled for the winter break. On 7 January 2026, it was announced that a friendly match against Thisted would be played on 17 January.

27 June 2025 Friendly	Midtjylland (Denmark)	2–0	(Denmark) Silkeborg	Ikast
12:00 CEST	Djú 33', 40'	Report		Stadium: Træningsbanen, Dream99

4 July 2025 Friendly	Silkeborg (Denmark)	1–3	(Denmark) Aarhus Fremad	Silkeborg
12:00 CEST	Gammelby 10'	Report	Kaastrup 47'; Kubel 70', 86'	Stadium: JYSK Park

6 July 2025 Friendly	Horsens (Denmark)	2–0	(Denmark) Silkeborg	Horsens
12:00 CEST	Pingel 35'; Olsen 46'	Report		Stadium: Field 6, Nordstern Arena Horsens

12 July 2025 Friendly	Silkeborg (Denmark)	3–1	(Denmark) Thisted	Silkeborg
11:30 CEST	Bøndergaard 61'; Simmelhack 72'; Stüker 89'	Report	66'	Stadium: JYSK Park

15 July 2025 Friendly	Silkeborg (Denmark)	1–4	(Germany) FC St. Pauli	Malente, Germany
16:00 CEST	Adamsen 24'; Andersen (yellow card) 67'	Report	Ceesay 5'; Afolayan 20'; Pereira Lage 54'; Hountondji 83'	Stadium: Am Stadion 4, Uwe Seeler Football Park

9 October 2025 Friendly	Silkeborg (Denmark)	5–2	(Denmark) Kolding IF	Silkeborg
12:00 CEST	Adamsen 16'; Berger 19', 31'; Bakiz 22' (pen.); Bøndergaard 58'	Report	Morozov 5'; Tånnander 73'	Stadium: JYSK Park

13 November 2025 Friendly	Holstein Kiel (Germany)	3–2	(Denmark) Silkeborg	Kiel, Germany
13:00 CET	Köster 58'; Harres 64', 67'	Report	Adamsen 42'; Simmelhack 55'	Stadium: Citti Fussball Park; Attendance: 159; Referee: Ben Uhrig (Germany)

17 January 2026 Friendly	Silkeborg (Denmark)	6–0	(Denmark) Thisted	Silkeborg
11:00 CET	Kirk 13'; Adamsen 14'; Lorents 23'; Berger 28'; McCowatt 88'; Westh 89'	Report		Stadium: JYSK Park; Attendance: ~400

23 January 2026 Friendly	Silkeborg (Denmark)	1–3	(Denmark) Esbjerg fB	Silkeborg
13:00 CET	Bakiz 71'	Report	Kruse 48'; Brajanac 58'; Lucena 64'	Stadium: JYSK Park

25 January 2026 Friendly	Silkeborg (Denmark)	8–2	(Denmark) Middelfart	Silkeborg
12:00 CET	Adamsen 16', 57' (pen.); Gammelby 42'; Bakiz 46'; Montano 47'; Biller 73'; Østrøm 80'; Simmelhack 89'	Report	Wielzen 37'; Zjajo 51'	Stadium: JYSK Park; Attendance: ~300

30 January 2026 Friendly	Sirius (Sweden)	2–1	(Denmark) Silkeborg	Uppsala, Sweden
13:00 CET	Bjerkebo 44', 57'	Report	Simmelhack 90+2'	Stadium: Studenternas IP

6 March 2026 Friendly	Brøndby (Denmark)	2–0	(Denmark) Silkeborg	Brøndby
12:00 CET	Ambæk 13'; Lahdo 33'	Report		Stadium: Brøndby Stadium

26 March 2026 Friendly	AGF (Denmark)	1–1	(Denmark) Silkeborg	Aarhus
13:00 CET	Mortensen 73'	Report	Hansen 84'	Stadium: Fredensvang

31 March 2026 Friendly	Midtjylland (Denmark)	1–1	(Denmark) Silkeborg	Herning
12:00 CEST	Júnior Brumado 34'	Report	Berger 50'	Stadium: Herning Fremad training facility

== Competitions ==
=== Overall record ===
Competition	First match	Last match	Starting round	Final position	Record							
Competition	First match	Last match	Starting round	Final position	Pld	W	D	L	GF	GA	GD	Win %
Superliga	20 July 2025	17 May 2026	Matchday 1	9th	32	10	6	16	41	67	−26	31.25
Danish Cup	3 September 2025	30 October 2025	Second round	Fourth round	3	2	0	1	7	5	+2	66.67
UEFA Conference League	23 July 2025	14 August 2025	Second qualifying round	Third qualifying round	4	1	2	1	6	6	+0	25.00
Total					39	13	8	18	54	78	−24	33.33

Source: Soccerway

=== Superliga ===
==== League table ====
Pos	Team	Pld	W	D	L	GF	GA	GD	Pts	Qualification
8	OB	22	7	6	9	36	46	−10	27	Qualification for the Relegation round
9	Randers	22	7	5	10	22	27	−5	26	Qualification for the Relegation round
10	Fredericia	22	7	3	12	30	49	−19	24	Qualification for the Relegation round
11	Silkeborg	22	5	4	13	24	45	−21	19	Qualification for the Relegation round
12	Vejle	22	3	5	14	26	45	−19	14	Qualification for the Relegation round

Source: Danish Football Association (in Danish), Soccerway
Rules for classification: 1) Points; 2) Goal difference; 3) Goals scored; 4) Away goals scored; 5) Play-off (played on neutral ground if determining teams for different rounds); 6) Draw.

==== Results summary ====
Overall								Home						Away					
Pld	W	D	L	GF	GA	GD	Pts	W	D	L	GF	GA	GD	W	D	L	GF	GA	GD
32	10	6	16	41	67	−26	36	5	4	7	18	26	−8	5	2	9	23	41	−18

Source: Soccerway

==== Results by round – regular season ====
Matchday	1	2	3	4	5	6	7	8	9	10	11	12	13	14	15	16	17	18	19	20	21	22
Ground	A	H	A	H	A	A	H	H	A	H	A	H	A	H	A	H	H	A	H	A	H	A
Result	L	L	L	W	W	L	L	W	D	D	L	W	W	L	D	L	D	L	L	L	L	L
Position	12	12	12	12	9	11	11	10	10	10	11	9	6	9	8	10	10	10	10	10	11	11
Points	0	0	0	3	6	6	6	9	10	11	11	14	17	17	18	18	19	19	19	19	19	19

Source: http://www.superliga.dk/
A = Away; H = Home; W = Win; D = Draw; L = Loss

==== Regular season ====
The match schedule for the first seven rounds was released on 6 June 2025. On 7 August, four more matches were scheduled. On 5 September, the remaining seven fixtures from the autumn calendar were revealed.

20 July 2025 1	Brøndby	3–0	Silkeborg	Brøndbyvester
20:00 CEST	Bundgaard 23', 61'; Vallys 86'	Report	Andersen (yellow card) 90+3'	Stadium: Brøndby Stadium; Attendance: 21,523; Referee: Jacob Karlsen

27 July 2025 2	Silkeborg	0–2	Fredericia	Silkeborg
16:00 CEST		Report	Marcussen 25'; Kudsk (yellow card) 42'; Simonsen 44'	Stadium: JYSK Park; Attendance: 3,554; Referee: Mikkel Redder

3 August 2025 3	Randers	1–0	Silkeborg	Randers
14:00 CEST	Toure 20' (pen.); Pedersen (yellow card) 39'	Report	Montano (yellow card) 19'	Stadium: Cepheus Park Randers; Attendance: 5,751; Referee: Jonas Hansen

10 August 2025 4	Silkeborg	4–2	Nordsjælland	Silkeborg
16:00 CEST	Adamsen 12' (pen.), (penalty missed) 79', 80', 90+1'; Bakiz 15'; Mattsson (yellow card) 50'	Report	Amoako Junior (yellow card) 22'; Røjkjær (yellow card) 34'; Lähteenmäki 45+5'; Berthelsen (yellow card) 51'; Busch 64' (o.g.); Yirenkyi (yellow card) 78'	Stadium: JYSK Park; Attendance: 3,516; Referee: Jakob Kehlet

17 August 2025 5	Viborg	2–3	Silkeborg	Viborg
16:00 CEST	Søndergaard 18', (yellow card) 72'; Vester 38'; Jørgensen (yellow card) 57'	Report	Busch 2'; Adamsen 11'; Mattsson (yellow card) 62'; Gammelby 90+1' (pen.)	Stadium: Energi Viborg Arena; Attendance: 6,387; Referee: Jacob Karlsen

24 August 2025 6	Midtjylland	4–2	Silkeborg	Herning
14:00 CEST	Djú 35'; Şimşir 51'; Osorio 64'; Gogorza (yellow card) 69', (goal) 81'; Brumado (yellow card) 72'	Report	Ólafsson 32' (o.g.); Freundlich (yellow card) 65'; McCowatt 70'	Stadium: MCH Arena; Attendance: 9,379; Referee: Mads-Kristoffer Kristoffersen

31 August 2025 7	Silkeborg	0–2	Sønderjyske	Silkeborg
14:00 CEST		Report	Hyseni (yellow card) 41'; Jensen (yellow card) 49'; Ingason 53'; Lyng 57'; Haidara (yellow card) 87'	Stadium: JYSK Park; Attendance: 4,513; Referee: Frederik Svendsen

14 September 2025 8	Silkeborg	2–1	OB	Silkeborg
18:00 CEST	McCowatt 42'; Adamsen 79'; Ganchas (yellow card) 85'	Report	Ganaus 1'; Bojang (yellow card) 54' (yellow-red card) 69'	Stadium: JYSK Park; Attendance: 4,024; Referee: Jakob Kehlet

21 September 2025 9	Copenhagen	3–3	Silkeborg	Copenhagen
16:00 CEST	Larsson 9'; Claesson 33'; Elyounoussi 46', (yellow card) 86'; López (yellow card) 49'; Hatzidiakos (yellow card) 62'; Huescas (yellow card) 90+2'	Report	McCowatt 3', 58', 74'	Stadium: Parken Stadium; Attendance: 28,928; Referee: Michael Tykgaard

28 September 2025 10	Silkeborg	1–1	Vejle	Silkeborg
16:00 CEST	Adamsen 22', (yellow card) 90'; Bakiz (yellow card) 55'; Ganchas (yellow card) 80'; Montano (yellow card) 90+1'	Report	Velkov (yellow card) 72', (goal) 73'; Tabatadze (yellow card) 77'	Stadium: JYSK Park; Attendance: 4,690; Referee: Jens Grabski Maae

5 October 2025 11	AGF	3–1	Silkeborg	Aarhus
16:00 CEST	Poulsen (yellow card) 7'; Arnstad 10'; Yakob 27'; Bech 65'	Report	McCowatt 32'; Westh (yellow card) 58'	Stadium: Ceres Park; Attendance: 8,849; Referee: Jonas Hansen

17 October 2025 12	Silkeborg	3–1	Copenhagen	Silkeborg
19:00 CEST	McCowatt 27'; Bakiz 29'; Gammelby 41'	Report	Chatzidiakos (yellow card) 55'; Claesson 60'	Stadium: JYSK Park; Attendance: 6,429; Referee: Jacob Karlsen

26 October 2025 13	Vejle	1–2	Silkeborg	Vejle
14:00 CET	Gammelgaard 8'; Velkov (yellow card) 40'	Report	Adamsen 19'; Ganchas 31'	Stadium: Vejle Stadium; Attendance: 6,209; Referee: Mikkel Redder

2 November 2025 14	Silkeborg	0–2	Brøndby	Silkeborg
20:00 CET	Freundlich (yellow card) 42'	Report	M. Larsen 7' (o.g.); Nartey 44'	Stadium: JYSK Park; Attendance: 5,146; Referee: Jens Grabski Maae

7 November 2025 15	OB	1–1	Silkeborg	Odense
19:00 CET	Grot (yellow card) 21'; Ganaus 79'	Report	McCowatt 39'	Stadium: Odense Stadium; Attendance: 7,207; Referee: Lasse Graagaard

21 November 2025 16	Silkeborg	0–2	AGF	Silkeborg
19:00 CET		Report	Carstensen 34'; Solbakken 79'	Stadium: JYSK Park; Attendance: 6,173; Referee: Jakob Sundberg

30 November 2025 17	Silkeborg	0–0	Randers	Silkeborg
14:00 CET	Al Hajj (yellow card) 48'; Freundlich (yellow card) 58'	Report	Toure (yellow card) 57'; Izzo (yellow card) 89'	Stadium: JYSK Park; Attendance: 3,165; Referee: Frederik Svendsen

7 December 2025 18	Nordsjælland	5–0	Silkeborg	Farum
14:00 CET	Walker (yellow card) 4'; Solbakken 18', 45+3'; Norheim 24'; Brink (yellow card) 31'; Ankersen 41', (yellow card) 74'; Nene (yellow card) 67'; Lind 68'	Report	Østrøm (red card) 17'; Freundlich (yellow card) 36'	Stadium: Right to Dream Park; Attendance: 2,167; Referee: Svend Funder

8 February 2026 19	Silkeborg	0–1	Viborg	Silkeborg
15:00 CET	Lorents (yellow card) 82'	Report	Kuzmić 60'; Mbom (yellow card) 85'	Stadium: JYSK Park; Attendance: 2,733; Referee: Mikkel Redder

16 February 2026 20	Sønderjyske	2–1	Silkeborg	Haderslev
20:00 CET	Emini (yellow card) 23'; Hyseni 77'; Qamili 84'	Report	Adamsen 6', (yellow card) 24'; Bakiz (yellow card) 38'; N. Larsen (yellow card) 74'; Gammelby (yellow card) 89'	Stadium: Sydbank Park; Attendance: 2,849; Referee: Jonas Hansen

22 February 2026 21	Silkeborg	0–4	Midtjylland	Silkeborg
17:00 CET	McCowatt (yellow card) 33'; Poulsen (yellow card) 45+2'; Ganchas (yellow card) 90+7'	Report	Şimşir 29', 66'; Mbabu (yellow card) 47'; Castillo 48'; Júnior Brumado 73'	Stadium: JYSK Park; Attendance: 4,077; Referee: Sandi Putros

1 March 2026 22	Fredericia	2–1	Silkeborg	Fredericia
18:00 CET	Crone 46'; Johannesen 68'	Report	M. Larsen (yellow card) 8'; Gammelby 44'	Stadium: Monjasa Park; Attendance: 2,557; Referee: Svend Funder

==== Relegation round ====
The match schedule for the relegation round was revealed on 6 March 2026, with the final two fixtures' dates being announced on 10 March.

Pos	Team	Pld	W	D	L	GF	GA	GD	Pts	
1	Copenhagen (O)	32	15	6	11	67	44	+23	51	Qualification for the European play-off match
2	OB	32	11	8	13	51	60	−9	41	
3	Silkeborg	32	10	6	16	41	67	−26	36	
4	Randers	32	9	8	15	33	47	−14	35	
5	Fredericia (R)	32	9	7	16	45	68	−23	34	Relegation to 1st Division

Source: Danish Football Association (in Danish), Soccerway
Rules for classification: 1) Points; 2) Goal difference; 3) Goals scored; 4) Away goals scored; 5) Play-off (played on neutral ground if determining teams for different rounds); 6) Draw.
(O) Play-off winners; (R) Relegated

==== Results by round - Relegation round ====
Matchday	1	2	3	4	5	6	7	8	9	10
Ground	H	A	A	H	H	A	H	A	H	A
Result	D	W	L	W	D	W	W	W	L	L
Position	5	5	5	5	5	5	3	3	3	3
Points	20	23	23	26	27	30	33	36	36	36

Source: http://www.superliga.dk/
A = Away; H = Home; W = Win; D = Draw; L = Loss

16 March 2026 23	Silkeborg	1–1	Vejle	Silkeborg
19:00 CET	Adamsen 79'; Kirk (yellow card) 83'; Oliver Ross (yellow card) 90+4'	Report	Bach 7'; Gammelgaard (yellow card) 35'; Sørensen (yellow card) 78'	Stadium: JYSK Park; Attendance: 3,202; Referee: Jakob Kehlet

22 March 2026 24	Randers	0–3	Silkeborg	Randers
14:00 CET	Pedersen (yellow card) 24'; Hansen (yellow card) 68'	Report	Adamsen 28'; McCowatt 33'; Poulsen 74'	Stadium: Cepheus Park Randers; Attendance: 3,815; Referee: Mikkel Redder

5 April 2026 25	Copenhagen	7–0	Silkeborg	Copenhagen
18:00 CEST	Moukoko 6', 25', 51'; Silva 13', 62'; Clem 17'; Jørgensen (yellow card) 57'; Larsson 78'	Report	McCowatt (yellow card) 57'	Stadium: Parken Stadium; Attendance: 20,372; Referee: Svend Funder

12 April 2026 26	Silkeborg	3–1	Odense	Silkeborg
14:00 CEST	Ganchas 67'; Ross 71'; Adamsen 89'; McCowatt (yellow card) 90'	Report	Berthel Askou (yellow card) 18'; McCoy 27'; Bürgy (yellow card) 90'	Stadium: JYSK Park; Attendance: 5,670; Referee: Jacob Karlsen

19 April 2026 27	Silkeborg	2–2	Fredericia	Silkeborg
14:00 CEST	McCowatt 23'; Adamsen 29'; Ross (yellow card) 33'	Report	Lindekilde 78', 90+3'	Stadium: JYSK Park; Attendance: 4,906; Referee: Jens Grabski Maae

22 April 2026 28	Vejle	1–2	Silkeborg	Vejle
18:00 CEST	Nielsen (yellow card) 14' (yellow-red card) 89'; Enggård (yellow card) 60'; Faghir 73'; Lund (yellow card) 90+2'	Report	McCowatt (yellow card) 60', (goal) 70'; Simmelhack (yellow card) 80'; Adamsen 90'	Stadium: Vejle Stadium; Attendance: 3,196; Referee: Aydin Uslu

26 April 2026 29	Silkeborg	2–0	Randers	Silkeborg
14:00 CEST	Simmelhack 8'; Lorents 89'; Østrøm (yellow card) 90+5'	Report	Dammers (yellow card) 41'; Björkengren (yellow card) 81'	Stadium: JYSK Park; Attendance: 4,422; Referee: Jonas Hansen

3 May 2026 30	Odense	2–3	Silkeborg	Odense
14:00 CEST	Ganaus 41'; Bürgy (red card) 67'; Martin 90+4'	Report	Gammelby 18', 85'; Adamsen 53'	Stadium: Odense Stadium; Attendance: 8,763; Referee: Svend Funder

10 May 2026 31	Silkeborg	0–4	Copenhagen	Silkeborg
16:00 CEST	Oliver Ross (yellow card) 75'	Report	Daðason 1'; Delaney 36'; Moukoko 81'; Claesson 85'	Stadium: JYSK Park; Attendance: 6,879; Referee: Jakob Kehlet

17 May 2026 32	Fredericia	4–1	Silkeborg	Fredericia
14:00 CEST	Kudsk (yellow card) 25'; Crone 26'; Jessen 33'; Lindekilde 41'; Johannesen 74'	Report	Stüker (yellow card) 78'; Kirk 79'	Stadium: Monjasa Park; Attendance: 2,536; Referee: Frederik Svendsen

=== Danish Cup ===
Silkeborg entered the Danish Cup in the second round, and were drawn against Danish 1st Division side Middelfart. In the third round, they were drawn against Jyllandsserien side Kolding Boldklub. They were drawn against fellow Danish Superliga side Midtjylland in the fourth round.

3 September 2025 Second round	Middelfart	1–2	Silkeborg	Middelfart
17:00 CEST	Hansen 43'; Boyum (yellow card) 78'	Report	Montano (yellow card) 30'; Adamsen 54', 86'	Stadium: Middelfart Stadium; Attendance: 1,000; Referee: Aydin Uslu

17 September 2025 Third round	Kolding Boldklub	0–5	Silkeborg	Kolding
18:30 CEST		Report	Ganchas 17'; Al Hajj 29'; Bøndergaard 68', 70'; Clemmensen 85'	Stadium: Mosevejs Sportsplads; Attendance: 1,436; Referee: Sandi Putros

30 October 2025 Fourth round	Midtjylland	4–0	Silkeborg	Herning
17:45 CET	Castillo 70'; Bak Jensen 72'; Djú 77'; Freundlich 84' (o.g.)	Report	Westh (yellow card) 57'	Stadium: MCH Arena; Attendance: 8,104; Referee: Mads-Kristoffer Kristoffersen

=== UEFA Conference League ===
==== Second qualifying round ====
The draw was held on 18 June 2025.

23 July 2025 First leg	Silkeborg (Denmark)	1–1	(Iceland) KA	Silkeborg
19:00 CEST	Simmelhack (yellow card) 24'; McCowatt 38'; Mattsson (yellow card) 67'; Andersen (yellow card) 70'	Report	H. M. Steingrímsson 90+1'	Stadium: JYSK Park; Attendance: 3,514; Referee: Bram Van Driessche (Belgium)

31 July 2025 Second leg	KA (Iceland)	2–3 (a.e.t.) (3–4 agg.)	(Denmark) Silkeborg	Akureyri, Iceland
20:00 CEST	Aðalsteinsson (yellow card) 20'; H. M. Steingrímsson 34' (pen.); Rømer (yellow card) 59'; Sigurgeirsson (yellow card) 78'; Kjartansson 86'	Report	Adamsen (penalty missed) 6', 54', 62', 114'; N. Larsen (yellow card) 33'	Stadium: KA Vollur; Attendance: 495; Referee: Peiman Simani (Finland)

==== Third qualifying round ====
7 August 2025 First leg	Silkeborg (Denmark)	0–1	(Poland) Jagiellonia Białystok	Silkeborg
19:00 CEST	Mattsson (yellow card) 50'; Østrøm (yellow card) 60'	Report	Vital 15', (yellow card) 87'; Romanczuk (yellow card) 71'; Pululu (yellow card) 72'	Stadium: JYSK Park; Attendance: 4,289; Referee: Jamie Robinson (Northern Ireland)

14 August 2025 Second leg	Jagiellonia Białystok (Poland)	2–2 (3–2 agg.)	(Denmark) Silkeborg	Białystok, Poland
20:15 CEST	Wojtuszek (yellow card) 23'; Imaz 29', 35'; Romanczuk (yellow card) 44'	Report	Berger 87'; Gammelby 90+5'; Freundlich (yellow card) 90+5'	Stadium: Stadion Miejski; Attendance: 17,369; Referee: Eric Wattellier (France)

== Statistics ==
=== Overall ===
Players with no appearances are not included on the list.

No.	Pos	Nat	Player	Total		Danish Superliga		Danish Cup		Conference League	
No.	Pos	Nat	Player	Apps	Goals	Apps	Goals	Apps	Goals	Apps	Goals
1	GK	(Denmark) DEN	Nicolai Larsen	37	0	31+0	0	2+0	0	4+0	0
2	DF	(Denmark) DEN	Andreas Poulsen	28	1	23+1	1	1+1	0	2+0	0
3	DF	(Norway) NOR	Robin Østrøm	37	0	31+0	0	3+0	0	3+0	0
4	DF	(Portugal) POR	Pedro Ganchas	34	2	28+0	1	3+0	1	3+0	0
6	MF	(Sweden) SWE	Adam Wikman	13	0	13+0	0	0+0	0	0+0	0
7	MF	(Denmark) DEN	Villads Westh	25	0	14+8	0	2+1	0	0+0	0
8	MF	(Denmark) DEN	Jeppe Andersen	16	0	2+11	0	1+0	0	0+2	0
9	FW	(Denmark) DEN	Alexander Simmelhack	20	1	3+12	1	1+1	0	1+2	0
10	MF	(Denmark) DEN	Younes Bakiz	29	2	20+4	2	2+0	0	3+0	0
11	FW	(Denmark) DEN	Oliver Ross	13	1	4+9	1	0+0	0	0+0	0
14	MF	(Denmark) DEN	Sofus Berger	22	1	7+13	0	0+1	0	0+1	1
15	DF	(Sweden) SWE	Melker Jonsson	2	0	1+1	0	0+0	0	0+0	0
17	MF	(New Zealand) NZL	Callum McCowatt	37	12	30+2	11	0+1	0	4+0	1
19	DF	(Denmark) DEN	Jens Martin Gammelby	39	6	32+0	5	3+0	0	3+1	1
20	MF	(Denmark) DEN	Mads Larsen	38	0	23+9	0	2+0	0	2+2	0
22	MF	(Sweden) SWE	Rami Al Hajj	29	1	12+10	0	3+0	1	3+1	0
23	FW	(Denmark) DEN	Tonni Adamsen	37	19	30+1	14	2+0	2	4+0	3
24	DF	(Denmark) DEN	Alexander Priesborg Madsen	3	0	3+0	0	0+0	0	0+0	0
27	MF	(Denmark) DEN	William Kirk	13	1	10+3	1	0+0	0	0+0	0
28	DF	(Denmark) DEN	Simon Stüker	6	0	2+4	0	0+0	0	0+0	0
29	FW	(Denmark) DEN	Malthe Hansen	1	0	0+1	0	0+0	0	0+0	0
30	GK	(Denmark) DEN	Aske Andrésen	3	0	1+1	0	1+0	0	0+0	0
33	MF	(Denmark) DEN	Mads Freundlich	28	0	16+6	0	2+0	0	3+1	0
36	MF	(Denmark) DEN	Julius Lorents	29	0	5+19	0	2+1	0	2+0	0
40	DF	(Denmark) DEN	Alexander Busch	9	1	2+4	1	0+0	0	0+3	0
Players who left the club or were loaned out during the season
6	MF	(Denmark) DEN	Pelle Mattsson	10	0	6+0	0	0+0	0	4+0	0
15	FW	(Denmark) DEN	Asbjørn Bøndergaard	8	2	0+4	0	1+2	2	0+1	0
18	DF	(Denmark) DEN	Leonel Montano	21	0	4+10	0	2+1	0	3+1	0
21	DF	(Denmark) DEN	Benjamin Clemmensen	3	1	0+1	0	0+2	1	0+0	0
35	FW	(Denmark) DEN	Sebastian Biller	3	0	0+1	0	0+1	0	0+1	0
41	MF	(Denmark) DEN	Oskar Boesen	13	0	2+6	0	0+2	0	0+3	0

=== Goals ===
Rank	Pos.	No.	Player	Danish Superliga	Danish Cup	Conference League	Total
1	FW	23	(Denmark) Tonni Adamsen	14	2	3	19
2	MF	17	(New Zealand) Callum McCowatt	11	0	1	12
3	DF	19	(Denmark) Jens Martin Gammelby	5	0	1	6
4	DF	4	(Portugal) Pedro Ganchas	2	1	0	3
5	FW	10	(Denmark) Younes Bakiz	2	0	0	2
5	FW	15	(Denmark) Asbjørn Bøndergaard	0	2	0	2
7	DF	2	(Denmark) Andreas Poulsen	1	0	0	1
7	FW	9	(Denmark) Alexander Simmelhack	1	0	0	1
7	FW	11	(Denmark) Oliver Ross	1	0	0	1
7	MF	14	(Denmark) Sofus Berger	0	0	1	1
7	DF	21	(Denmark) Benjamin Clemmensen	0	1	0	1
7	MF	22	(Sweden) Rami Al Hajj	0	1	0	1
7	MF	27	(Denmark) William Kirk	1	0	0	1
7	MF	36	(Denmark) Julius Lorents	1	0	0	1
7	DF	40	(Denmark) Alexander Busch	1	0	0	1
Own goals				1	0	0	1
Total				41	7	6	54

=== Hat-tricks ===
Player	Against	Result	Date	Competition	Ref.
(Denmark) Tonni Adamsen	(Iceland) KA (A)	3–2 (a.e.t.)	31 July 2025	UEFA Conference League	
(Denmark) Tonni Adamsen	Nordsjælland (H)	4–2	10 August 2025	Danish Superliga	
(New Zealand) Callum McCowatt	Copenhagen (A)	3–3	21 September 2025	Danish Superliga	

=== Clean sheets ===
The list is sorted by shirt number when total clean sheets are equal. Numbers in parentheses represent matches where both goalkeepers participated and both kept a clean sheet; the number in parentheses is awarded to the goalkeeper who was substituted on, whilst a full clean sheet is awarded to the goalkeeper who was on the field at the start of play.

Rank	No.	Player	Matches played	Goals against	Clean sheets				
Rank	No.	Player	Matches played	Goals against	Danish Superliga	Danish Cup	Conference League	Total	Clean sheet %
1	1	(Denmark) Nicolai Larsen	37	76	3	0	0	3	8.1%
2	30	(Denmark) Aske Andrésen	2	2	0	1	0	1	50.0%
Total			39	78	3	1	0	4	10.3%

=== Disciplinary record ===
No.	Pos.	Player	Danish Superliga			Danish Cup			Conference League			Total		
No.	Pos.	Player	Yellow card	(yellow card) (yellow-red card)	Red card	Yellow card	(yellow card) (yellow-red card)	Red card	Yellow card	(yellow card) (yellow-red card)	Red card	Yellow card	(yellow card) (yellow-red card)	Red card
1	GK	(Denmark) Nicolai Larsen	1	0	0	0	0	0	1	0	0	2	0	0
2	DF	(Denmark) Andreas Poulsen	1	0	0	0	0	0	0	0	0	1	0	0
3	DF	(Norway) Robin Østrøm	1	0	1	0	0	0	1	0	0	2	0	1
4	DF	(Portugal) Pedro Ganchas	3	0	0	0	0	0	0	0	0	3	0	0
7	MF	(Denmark) Villads Westh	1	0	0	1	0	0	0	0	0	2	0	0
8	MF	(Denmark) Jeppe Andersen	1	0	0	0	0	0	1	0	0	2	0	0
9	FW	(Denmark) Alexander Simmelhack	1	0	0	0	0	0	1	0	0	2	0	0
10	MF	(Denmark) Younes Bakiz	2	0	0	0	0	0	0	0	0	2	0	0
11	MF	(Denmark) Oliver Ross	4	0	0	0	0	0	0	0	0	4	0	0
17	FW	(New Zealand) Callum McCowatt	4	0	0	0	0	0	0	0	0	4	0	0
19	DF	(Denmark) Jens Martin Gammelby	1	0	0	0	0	0	0	0	0	1	0	0
20	MF	(Denmark) Mads Larsen	1	0	0	0	0	0	0	0	0	1	0	0
22	MF	(Sweden) Rami Al Hajj	1	0	0	0	0	0	0	0	0	1	0	0
23	FW	(Denmark) Tonni Adamsen	2	0	0	0	0	0	0	0	0	2	0	0
27	MF	(Denmark) William Kirk	1	0	0	0	0	0	0	0	0	1	0	0
28	DF	(Denmark) Simon Stüker	1	0	0	0	0	0	0	0	0	1	0	0
33	MF	(Denmark) Mads Freundlich	4	0	0	0	0	0	1	0	0	5	0	0
36	MF	(Denmark) Julius Lorents	1	0	0	0	0	0	0	0	0	1	0	0
Players who left the club or were loaned out during the season
6	MF	(Denmark) Pelle Mattsson	2	0	0	0	0	0	2	0	0	4	0	0
18	DF	(Denmark) Leonel Montano	2	0	0	1	0	0	0	0	0	3	0	0
Total			34	0	1	2	0	0	7	0	0	43	0	1
