= 2026–27 Silkeborg IF season =

Danish football club season

Silkeborg
2026–27 season
- Owner: Trivela Group
- Chairman: Kent Madsen
- Manager: Morten Dahm Kjærgaard
- Stadium: JYSK Park
- Danish Superliga: 9th
- Danish Cup: Second round
- Top goalscorer: League: Oliver Ross (7); All: Oliver Ross (7)
- Highest home attendance: 6,897 v Copenhagen (2 August 2026, Superliga)
- Lowest home attendance: 3,539 v Lyngby (6 November 2026, Superliga)
- Average home league attendance: 4,787
- Biggest win: 4–0 v Lyngby (18 September 2026, Superliga)
- Biggest defeat: 0–4 v Sønderjyske (18 October 2026, Superliga)
Home colours	Away colours
- All statistics correct as of 22 November 2026.

The 2025–26 season is the 110th season in the history of Silkeborg Idrætsforening and the club's sixth consecutive season in the top flight of Danish football. In addition to the domestic league, the team participated in the Danish Cup.

== First‑team squad ==
As of 15 September 2026

No.	Player	Position	Nationality	Date of birth (age)	Signed from	Date signed	Fee	Contract end
Goalkeepers
1	Aske Andrésen	GK	(Denmark)	12 July 2005 (age 21)	Academy	1 July 2023	—N/a	2029
16	Bastian Holm	GK	(Denmark)	13 February 2005 (age 21)	Academy	1 July 2025	—N/a	2029
30	Thomas Mikkelsen	GK	(Denmark)	27 August 1983 (age 43)	Brøndby	2 September 2026	Free	2026
Defenders
2	Andreas Poulsen	LB	(Denmark)	13 October 1999 (age 27)	AaB	1 July 2024	Undisclosed	2027
3	Robin Østrøm	RB / CB	(Norway)	9 August 2002 (age 24)	OB	23 August 2022	Undisclosed	2028
4	Pedro Ganchas	CB	(Portugal)	31 May 2000 (age 26)	(Portugal) Paços de Ferreira	2 July 2024	€400k	2028
6	Maël de Gevigney	CB	(France)	25 July 2003 (age 23)	(England) Barnsley	18 August 2026	Undisclosed	2029
15	Melker Jonsson	CB	(Sweden)	10 September 2002 (age 24)	(Sweden) Landskrona BoIS	29 January 2026	Free transfer	2026
19	Jens Martin Gammelby	RB	(Denmark)	5 February 1995 (age 31)	(Norway) HamKam	1 January 2024	€100k	2028
24	Alexander Priesborg Madsen	CB	(Denmark)	14 May 2005 (age 21)	Academy	1 July 2024	—N/a	2028
25	Pontus Rödin	CB	(Sweden)	16 August 2000 (age 26)	(Sweden) Brage	29 January 2024	€200k	2027
28	William Møller	CB	(Denmark)	9 January 2008 (age 18)	Academy	1 July 2026	—N/a	2028
40	Alexander Busch	CB	(Denmark)	25 July 2003 (age 23)	Academy	15 January 2024	—N/a	2027
Midfielders
7	Villads Westh	CM	(Denmark)	25 April 2004 (age 22)	Kolding IF	1 September 2025	Undisclosed	2029
14	Sofus Berger	CM	(Denmark)	2 June 2003 (age 23)	Viborg	1 February 2025	€300k	2028
20	Mads Larsen	CM	(Denmark)	20 September 2001 (age 25)	Esbjerg fB	17 January 2024	€135k	2027
22	Rami Al Hajj	AM	(Sweden)	17 September 2001 (age 25)	(England) Plymouth Argyle	11 July 2025	Undisclosed	2029
26	Mikkel Øxenberg	DM	(Denmark)	25 January 2007 (age 19)	Academy	1 July 2025	—N/a	2030
27	William Kirk	AM	(Denmark)	13 January 2007 (age 19)	Academy	1 January 2026	—N/a	?
33	Mads Freundlich	CM	(Denmark)	25 March 2003 (age 23)	Hobro	16 July 2024	€535k	2029
36	Julius Lorents	CM	(Denmark)	26 April 2006 (age 20)	Academy	1 July 2025	—N/a	2029
Forwards
8	Kristian Kirkegaard	RW	(Denmark)	2 October 1997 (age 29)	Horsens	1 September 2026	€400k	2030
11	Oliver Ross	LW / CF / AM	(Denmark)	10 October 2004 (age 22)	AaB	2 February 2026	Undisclosed	2029
21	Lucas Riisgaard	RW	(Denmark)	26 March 2004 (age 22)	Aarhus Fremad	15 July 2026	Undisclosed	2031
23	Malthe Emil Hansen	ST	(Denmark)	21 November 2007 (age 19)	Academy	1 July 2026	—N/a	2031

== Transfers ==
=== In ===
Pos.	Player	Transferred from	Fee	Date	Source
MF	(Denmark) Oskar Boesen	(Norway) Stabæk	Loan return	30 June 2026	
DF	(Denmark) Lucas Riisgaard	(Denmark) Aarhus Fremad	Undisclosed	15 July 2026	
DF	(France) Maël de Gevigney	(England) Barnsley	Undisclosed	18 August 2026	
FW	(Denmark) Kristian Kirkegaard	(Denmark) Horsens	€400,000	1 September 2026	
GK	(Denmark) Thomas Mikkelsen	(Denmark) Brøndby	Free transfer	2 September 2026	

=== Out ===
Pos.	Player	Transferred to	Fee	Date	Source
MF	(Denmark) Oskar Boesen	(Denmark) Esbjerg fB	Undisclosed	1 July 2026	
GK	(Denmark) Nicolai Larsen	(Denmark) Vejle	Free transfer	1 July 2026	
MF	(Denmark) Jeppe Andersen	Free agent	End of contract	1 July 2026	
FW	(Denmark) Tonni Adamsen	(Austria) Rapid Wien	Free transfer	1 July 2026	
DF	(Denmark) Simon Stüker	(Denmark) Randers	Undisclosed	29 August 2026	
FW	(Denmark) Alexander Simmelhack	(Sweden) IFK Göteborg	Undisclosed	31 August 2026	
FW	(New Zealand) Callum McCowatt	(Denmark) AGF	Undisclosed	1 September 2026	
FW	(Denmark) Younes Bakiz	(Morocco) Raja CA	Loan	15 September 2026	

== Pre-season and friendlies ==
4 July 2026 Friendly	Midtjylland (Denmark)	4–2	(Denmark) Silkeborg	Herning
13:00 CEST	Gogorza 3'; Osorio 16'; Iheanacho 65'; Bunten 73'	Report	Al Hajj 53'; Berger 68'

8 July 2026 Friendly	Aarhus Fremad (Denmark)	1–0	(Denmark) Silkeborg	Aarhus
12:00 CEST	Yusuf Abdullahi 14'	Report		Stadium: Riisvangen Stadium

11 July 2026 Friendly	Silkeborg (Denmark)	6–0	(Denmark) Thisted	Silkeborg
12:00 CEST	Priesborg Madsen 36'; Ross 41'; Hansen 53', 87'; Lorents 68'; Jonsson 90'	Report		Stadium: JYSK Park

17 July 2026 Friendly	AaB (Denmark)	1–2	(Denmark) Silkeborg	Aalborg
12:00 CEST	Kubel 69'	Report	Al Hajj 3'; Westh 16'	Stadium: Aalborg Stadium

2 October 2026 Friendly	(Denmark) Esbjerg fB	0–2	(Denmark) Silkeborg	Esbjerg
13:00 CEST		Report	Gammelby 33'; Hansen 81'	Stadium: Jens Peder Hansens Vej

== Competitions ==
=== Overall record ===
Competition	First match	Last match	Starting round	Final position	Record							
Competition	First match	Last match	Starting round	Final position	Pld	W	D	L	GF	GA	GD	Win %
Superliga	27 July 2026		Matchday 1		15	3	6	6	19	27	−8	20.00
Danish Cup	27 August 2026		Second round	Second round	1	0	0	1	0	3	−3	0.00
Total					16	3	6	7	19	30	−11	18.75

Last updated: 22 November 2026
Source: Soccerway

=== Superliga ===
==== League table ====
Pos	Team	Pld	W	D	L	GF	GA	GD	Pts	Qualification
7	Horsens	15	5	4	6	26	24	+2	19	Qualification for the Relegation round
8	AGF	15	4	6	5	21	22	−1	18	Qualification for the Relegation round
9	Silkeborg	15	3	6	6	19	27	−8	15	Qualification for the Relegation round
10	Randers	15	3	3	9	14	27	−13	12	Qualification for the Relegation round
11	Lyngby	15	2	5	8	20	31	−11	11	Qualification for the Relegation round

Updated to match(es) played on 22 November 2026. Source: Danish Football Association (in Danish), Soccerway
Rules for classification: 1) Points; 2) Goal difference; 3) Goals scored; 4) Away goals scored; 5) Play-off (played on neutral ground if determining teams for different rounds); 6) Draw.

==== Results summary ====
Overall								Home						Away					
Pld	W	D	L	GF	GA	GD	Pts	W	D	L	GF	GA	GD	W	D	L	GF	GA	GD
15	3	6	6	19	27	−8	15	2	4	1	9	9	0	1	2	5	10	18	−8

Last updated: 22 November 2026.
Source: Soccerway

==== Results by round – regular season ====
Matchday	1	2	3	4	5	6	7	8	9	10	11	12	13	14	15	16	17	18	19	20	21	22
Ground	A	H	H	A	A	H	A	H	A	H	A	H	A	H	A	H	A	H	A	H	A	H
Result	D	L	W	L	L	D	D	D	W	D	L	D	L	W	L							
Position	9	9	7	7	8	9	9	10	7	7	8	8	9	9	9							
Points	1	1	4	4	4	5	6	7	10	11	11	12	12	15	15							

Updated to match(es) played on 22 November 2026. Source: http://www.superliga.dk/
A = Away; H = Home; W = Win; D = Draw; L = Loss

==== Regular season ====
27 July 2026 1	Randers	1–1	Silkeborg	Randers
20:00 CEST	Themsen 10'; Pedersen (yellow card) 37'	Report	Ross (yellow card) 45'	Stadium: Cepheus Park Randers; Attendance: 5,009; Referee: Jacob Karlsen

2 August 2026 2	Silkeborg	1–3	Copenhagen	Silkeborg
19:00 CEST	Ross (yellow card) 25'; Møller (yellow card) 50'; Riisgaard (yellow card) 90+1'	Report	Elyounoussi (yellow card) 36', (goal) 42', 46', 62'; López (yellow card) 60'	Stadium: JYSK Park; Attendance: 6,897; Referee: Lasse Graagaard

10 August 2026 3	Silkeborg	1–0	OB	Silkeborg
20:00 CEST	McCowatt 51', (yellow card) 67'	Report	Jenssen (yellow card) 58'; Andersen (yellow card) 84'; Askou (yellow card) 90+7'	Stadium: JYSK Park; Attendance: 3,981; Referee: Svend Funder

16 August 2026 4	Nordsjælland	1–0	Silkeborg	Farum
15:00 CEST	Markmann (yellow card) 15'; Adel 80', (yellow card) 90+4'	Report	McCowatt (yellow card) 15'; Østrøm (yellow card) 90+3'	Stadium: Right to Dream Park; Attendance: 3,917; Referee: Sandi Putros

24 August 2026 5	Brøndby	3–1	Silkeborg	Brøndbyvester
20:00 CEST	Köhlert (yellow card) 6'; Binks (yellow card) 17', (goal) 87'; Vanlerberghe 51'; Fenger 54'; Frøkjær-Jensen (yellow card) 68'	Report	Møller (yellow card) 32'; McCowatt 44', (yellow card) 90+3'; Priesborg Madsen (yellow card) 86'	Stadium: Brøndby Stadium; Attendance: 20,950; Referee: Aydin Uslu

30 August 2026 6	Silkeborg	1–1	Midtjylland	Silkeborg
15:00 CEST	Kirk 13'	Report	Emefile (red card) 57'; Iheanacho 66'	Stadium: JYSK Park; Attendance: 5,447; Referee: Jacob Karlsen

5 September 2026 7	AGF	2–2	Silkeborg	Risskov
19:00 CEST	Serra 80', 90+3'; Anderson (yellow card) 90+1'	Report	Al Hajj 29' (pen.); Riisgaard 39'	Stadium: Ceres Park Vejlby; Attendance: 8,577; Referee: Lasse Graagaard

13 September 2026 8	Silkeborg	1–1	Viborg	Silkeborg
15:00 CEST	Riisgaard 11'; Westh (yellow card) 90+2'	Report	Bundgaard (yellow card) 5'; Beck 56'	Stadium: JYSK Park; Attendance: 5,112; Referee: Michael Tykgaard

18 September 2026 9	Lyngby	0–4	Silkeborg	Kongens Lyngby
20:00 CEST	Thomasen (yellow card) 7'; Colyn (yellow card) 36' (yellow-red card) 69'; Hebo (yellow card) 90+2'	Report	Priesborg Madsen 39'; Ross 52'; Westh 72'; Hansen 85'; Gammelby (yellow card) 89'; Freundlich (yellow card) 90+2'	Stadium: Lyngby Stadium; Attendance: 4,438; Referee: Sandi Putros

11 October 2026 10	Silkeborg	3–3	Horsens	Silkeborg
15:00 CEST	Ross 48' (pen.), 63', 71'; Bøgild (yellow card) 90+4'	Report	Saine 8', 90+5'; Bonde 23', (yellow card) 59'; Moro (yellow card) 47'; Tauriainen (yellow card) 90+1'	Stadium: JYSK Park; Attendance: 4,489; Referee: Jakob Kehlet

18 October 2026 11	Sønderjyske	4–0	Silkeborg	Haderslev
15:00 CEST	Wilkins 1'; Velkov 22'; Haidara 32'; Munksgaard (yellow card) 65'; Haltvik 78'	Report	Westh (red card) 18'; Freundlich (yellow card) 29'	Stadium: Sydbank Park; Attendance: 4,855; Referee: Svend Funder

25 October 2026 12	Silkeborg	1–1	Nordsjælland	Silkeborg
15:00 CET	De Gevigney (yellow card) 25'; Ross (yellow card) 34', (goal) 38'; Priesborg (yellow card) 67'; Freundlich (yellow card) 90+1'; Bøgild (yellow card) 90+4'	Report	Brink (yellow card) 32'; Salquist (yellow card) 33'; Lind 55'	Stadium: JYSK Park; Attendance: 4,046; Referee: Jonas Hansen

1 November 2026 13	OB	4–1	Silkeborg	Odense
15:00 CET	Gammelgaard 37', 65'; Arp 55'; Pauli 68'	Report	Gammelby 16'; Ross (yellow card) 46'; Priesborg (yellow card) 66'; Ganchas (yellow card) 84'	Stadium: Nature Energy Park; Attendance: 7,339; Referee: Mads-Kristoffer Kristoffersen

6 November 2026 14	Silkeborg	1–0	Lyngby	Silkeborg
20:00 CET	Gammelby 57'; Freundlich (yellow card) 68'; Priesborg (yellow card) 85'; Westh (yellow card) 90+1'	Report	Sertdemir (yellow card) 80'	Stadium: JYSK Park; Attendance: 3,539; Referee: Frederik Svendsen

22 November 2026 15	Horsens	3–1	Silkeborg	Horsens
15:00 CET	Ouorou 26', (yellow card) 74'; Körkkö 62'; Jørgensen 90'; Batigi (yellow card) 90+1'	Report	Møller (red card) 53'; Riisgaard (yellow card) 70'; Westh 81'	Stadium: Hybel Arena Horsens; Attendance: 2,832; Referee: Mikkel Redder

29 November 2026 16	Silkeborg	v	AGF	Silkeborg
19:00 CET		Report		Stadium: JYSK Park

6 December 2026 17	Midtjylland	v	Silkeborg	Herning
15:00 CET		Report		Stadium: MCH Arena

=== Danish Cup ===
Silkeborg entered the Danish Cup in the second round, and were drawn against Danish 1st Division side Vejle.

27 August 2026 Second round	Vejle	3–0	Silkeborg	Vejle
19:30 CEST	Edjeodji 10'; Camara 75'; Marcussen 90'	Report	De Gevigney (yellow card) 18'	Stadium: Vejle Stadium; Attendance: 3,066; Referee: Mads-Kristoffer Kristoffersen

== Statistics ==
As of match played 22 November 2026

=== Overall ===
Players with no appearances are not included on the list.

No.	Pos	Nat	Player	Total		Danish Superliga		Danish Cup	
No.	Pos	Nat	Player	Apps	Goals	Apps	Goals	Apps	Goals
1	GK	(Denmark) DEN	Aske Andrésen	16	0	15+0	0	1+0	0
2	DF	(Denmark) DEN	Andreas Poulsen	6	0	1+4	0	0+1	0
3	DF	(Norway) NOR	Robin Østrøm	16	0	15+0	0	1+0	0
4	DF	(Portugal) POR	Pedro Ganchas	7	0	2+4	0	1+0	0
6	DF	(France) FRA	Maël de Gevigney	7	0	2+4	0	1+0	0
7	MF	(Denmark) DEN	Villads Westh	13	2	13+0	2	0+0	0
8	MF	(Denmark) DEN	Kristian Kirkegaard	7	0	4+3	0	0+0	0
11	FW	(Denmark) DEN	Oliver Ross	16	7	14+1	7	1+0	0
14	MF	(Denmark) DEN	Sofus Berger	11	0	0+10	0	1+0	0
15	DF	(Sweden) SWE	Melker Jonsson	1	0	0+1	0	0+0	0
19	DF	(Denmark) DEN	Jens Martin Gammelby	16	2	15+0	2	1+0	0
20	MF	(Denmark) DEN	Mads Larsen	16	0	15+0	0	1+0	0
21	FW	(Denmark) DEN	Lucas Riisgaard	16	2	12+3	2	0+1	0
22	MF	(Sweden) SWE	Rami Al Hajj	13	1	9+4	1	0+0	0
23	FW	(Denmark) DEN	Malthe Hansen	5	1	0+4	1	0+1	0
24	DF	(Denmark) DEN	Alexander Priesborg Madsen	16	1	14+1	1	0+1	0
26	MF	(Denmark) DEN	Mikkel Øxenberg	3	0	0+3	0	0+0	0
27	MF	(Denmark) DEN	William Kirk	16	1	13+2	1	1+0	0
29	DF	(Denmark) DEN	William Møller	9	0	9+0	0	0+0	0
33	MF	(Denmark) DEN	Mads Freundlich	6	0	2+4	0	0+0	0
36	MF	(Denmark) DEN	Julius Lorents	12	0	3+9	0	0+0	0
42	FW	(Denmark) DEN	Kristian Bøgild	8	0	1+6	0	0+1	0
Players who left the club or were loaned out during the season
9	FW	(Denmark) DEN	Alexander Simmelhack	4	0	0+4	0	0+0	0
10	MF	(Denmark) DEN	Younes Bakiz	6	0	0+5	0	1+0	0
17	FW	(New Zealand) NZL	Callum McCowatt	5	2	5+0	2	0+0	0

=== Goals ===
Rank	Pos.	No.	Player	Danish Superliga	Danish Cup	Total
1	FW	11	(Denmark) Oliver Ross	7	0	7
2	FW	17	(New Zealand) Callum McCowatt	2	0	2
2	DF	19	(Denmark) Jens Martin Gammelby	2	0	2
2	FW	21	(Denmark) Lucas Riisgaard	2	0	2
2	MF	7	(Denmark) Villads Westh	2	0	2
6	DF	24	(Denmark) Alexander Priesborg Madsen	1	0	1
6	MF	22	(Sweden) Rami Al Hajj	1	0	1
6	FW	23	(Denmark) Malthe Hansen	1	0	1
6	MF	27	(Denmark) William Kirk	1	0	1
Total				19	0	19

=== Hat-tricks ===
Player	Against	Result	Date	Competition	Ref.
(Denmark) Oliver Ross	AC Horsens (H)	3–3	11 October 2026	Danish Superliga	

=== Clean sheets ===
The list is sorted by shirt number when total clean sheets are equal. Numbers in parentheses represent matches where both goalkeepers participated and both kept a clean sheet; the number in parentheses is awarded to the goalkeeper who was substituted on, whilst a full clean sheet is awarded to the goalkeeper who was on the field at the start of play.

Rank	No.	Player	Matches played	Goals against	Clean sheets			
Rank	No.	Player	Matches played	Goals against	Danish Superliga	Danish Cup	Total	Clean sheet %
1	30	(Denmark) Aske Andrésen	16	30	3	0	3	18.8%
Total			16	30	3	0	3	18.8%

=== Disciplinary record ===
No.	Pos.	Player	Danish Superliga			Danish Cup			Total		
No.	Pos.	Player	Yellow card	(yellow card) (yellow-red card)	Red card	Yellow card	(yellow card) (yellow-red card)	Red card	Yellow card	(yellow card) (yellow-red card)	Red card
3	DF	(Norway) Robin Østrøm	1	0	0	0	0	0	1	0	0
4	DF	(Portugal) Pedro Ganchas	1	0	0	0	0	0	1	0	0
6	DF	(France) Maël de Gevigney	1	0	0	1	0	0	2	0	0
7	MF	(Denmark) Villads Westh	2	0	1	0	0	0	2	0	1
11	FW	(Denmark) Oliver Ross	2	0	0	0	0	0	2	0	0
19	DF	(Denmark) Jens Martin Gammelby	1	0	0	0	0	0	1	0	0
21	FW	(Denmark) Lucas Riisgaard	2	0	0	0	0	0	2	0	0
24	DF	(Denmark) Alexander Priesborg Madsen	4	0	0	0	0	0	4	0	0
29	DF	(Denmark) William Møller	2	0	1	0	0	0	2	0	1
33	MF	(Denmark) Mads Freundlich	4	0	0	0	0	0	4	0	0
42	FW	(Denmark) Kristian Bøgild	2	0	0	0	0	0	2	0	0
Players who left the club or were loaned out during the season
17	FW	(New Zealand) Callum McCowatt	3	0	0	0	0	0	3	0	0
Total			25	0	2	1	0	0	26	0	2
