= List of Danish football transfers winter 2025–26 =

This is a list of Danish football transfers for the 2025–26 winter transfer window. Only transfers featuring Superliga and 1. Division are listed.

== Superliga ==
Note: Flags indicate national team as has been defined under FIFA eligibility rules. Players may hold more than one non-FIFA nationality.

=== Copenhagen ===
In:

No.	Pos.	Nation	Player
17	DF	POR	Aurélio Buta (from (Germany) Eintracht Frankfurt)
18	DF	CRC	Kenay Myrie (from (Costa Rica) Saprissa)
23	MF	MAR	Amir Richardson (on loan from (Italy) Fiorentina)
25	DF	DEN	Zanka (free agent)

Out:

No.	Pos.	Nation	Player
4	DF	ZIM	Munashe Garananga (on loan to (Scotland) Hibernian)
12	MF	DEN	Lukas Lerager (to (Poland) Widzew Łódź)
22	DF	FRA	Yoram Zague (loan return to (France) Paris Saint-Germain)
23	MF	POL	Dominik Sarapata (on loan to (Poland) Wisła Płock)
—	FW	ALG	Amin Chiakha (on loan to (Norway) Rosenborg, previously on loan at Vejle)

=== Midtjylland ===
In:

No.	Pos.	Nation	Player
17	FW	DEN	Mikael Uhre (from (United States) Philadelphia Union)
39	FW	SUI	Arlet Junior Zé (on loan from (Switzerland) Basel)

Out:

No.	Pos.	Nation	Player
80	MF	POR	Dani Silva (on loan to (Cyprus) Pafos)
90	FW	NGR	Friday Etim (to Fredericia)

=== Brøndby ===
In:

No.	Pos.	Nation	Player
14	DF	ENG	Ben Godfrey (on loan from (Italy) Atalanta, previously on loan at (England) Sheffield United)
17	FW	NGR	Emmanuel Dennis (free agent)
22	FW	SEN	Ousmane Sow (from (Poland) Górnik Zabrze)
23	FW	SWE	Mayckel Lahdo (on loan from (Netherlands) AZ, previously on loan at (France) Nantes)
29	MF	DEN	Mads Frøkjær-Jensen (from (England) Preston North End)
99	MF	POL	Bartosz Slisz (from (United States) Atlanta United)

Out:

No.	Pos.	Nation	Player
6	MF	NED	Stijn Spierings (to (United States) Real Salt Lake)
9	FW	AUT	Michael Gregoritsch (on loan to (Germany) FC Augsburg)
17	DF	USA	Justin Che (to (United States) New York Red Bulls)
18	FW	JPN	Kōtarō Uchino (on loan to (Japan) Vissel Kobe)
21	FW	AUS	Marcus Younis (on loan to (Australia) Melbourne City)
35	MF	DEN	Noah Nartey (to (France) Lyon)

=== Randers ===
In:

No.	Pos.	Nation	Player
10	FW	MAD	Warren Caddy (from (Switzerland) Stade Lausanne Ouchy)
15	DF	NOR	Martin Sjølstad (from (Norway) Sogndal)
23	DF	SWE	Benjamin Örn (from (Sweden) Helsingborg)
30	FW	TOG	Thibault Klidjé (on loan from (Scotland) Hibernian)
33	FW	GHA	Cyril Edudzi (from (Georgia (country)) Dila Gori)

Out:

No.	Pos.	Nation	Player
7	FW	AUS	Mohamed Touré (to (England) Norwich City)
10	FW	NGR	Norman Campbell (to (Japan) V-Varen Nagasaki)
23	DF	SWE	Elias Andersson (to (Sweden) Nordic United)
27	DF	DEN	Oliver Olsen (to (Germany) VfL Bochum)
90	FW	NGR	Stephen Odey (free agent)
—	MF	SYR	Noah Shamoun (reloan to (Sweden) Värnamo)

=== Nordsjælland ===
In:

No.	Pos.	Nation	Player
14	FW	EGY	Ibrahim Adel (on loan from (United Arab Emirates) Al Jazira)
22	GK	DEN	Andreas Gülstorff (from (Norway) Jerv)
37	MF	SEN	Lamine Sadio (from (Ghana) Right to Dream)

Out:

No.	Pos.	Nation	Player
15	DF	DEN	Erik Marxen (retired)
30	DF	GHA	Issaka Seidu (on loan to (Sweden) Ljungskile)
31	GK	DEN	Andreas Søndenbroe (on loan to Næstved)
38	GK	DEN	William Lykke (on loan to (Sweden) Halmstad)
41	FW	DEN	Villum Dalsgaard (on loan to (Norway) Hødd)
—	MF	FRA	Rocco Ascone (to (Sweden) Halmstad, previously on loan)

=== AGF ===
In:

No.	Pos.	Nation	Player
4	MF	NOR	Magnus Knudsen (from (Germany) Holstein Kiel)
21	GK	NOR	Mads Hedenstad Christiansen (from (Norway) Lillestrøm)

Out:

No.	Pos.	Nation	Player
15	FW	SEN	Youssouph Badji (on loan to (Greece) Panetolikos)
22	GK	SWE	Leopold Wahlstedt (to (Norway) Rosenborg)
32	GK	DEN	Jonathan Hutters (to Middelfart)
—	DF	DEN	Aksel Halsgaard (to Næstved, previously on loan)

=== Silkeborg ===
In:

No.	Pos.	Nation	Player
6	MF	SWE	Adam Wikman (on loan from (Sweden) Sirius)
11	FW	DEN	Oliver Ross (from AaB)
15	DF	SWE	Melker Jonsson (from (Sweden) Landskrona)

Out:

No.	Pos.	Nation	Player
15	FW	DEN	Asbjørn Bøndergaard (to Lyngby)
18	DF	DEN	Leonel Montano (on loan to (Finland) HJK)
21	DF	DEN	Benjamin Clemmensen (loan return to Vendsyssel)
35	FW	DEN	Sebastian Biller (on loan to (Norway) Hødd)
41	MF	DEN	Oskar Boesen (on loan to (Norway) Stabæk)
—	MF	KAZ	Ramazan Orazov (to (Kazakhstan) Elimai, previously on loan)

=== Viborg ===
In:

No.	Pos.	Nation	Player
14	FW	ISL	Ísak Andri Sigurgeirsson (on loan from (Sweden) Norrköping)
17	FW	DEN	Osman Addo (from B.93)

Out:

No.	Pos.	Nation	Player
37	MF	DEN	Jakob Vester (to (Norway) Sandefjord)

=== Sønderjyske ===
In:

No.	Pos.	Nation	Player

Out:

No.	Pos.	Nation	Player
10	FW	ISL	Kristall Máni Ingason (to (Norway) Brann)
18	MF	MKD	Ivan Nikolov (to (Bosnia and Herzegovina) Radnik Bijeljina)
25	FW	DEN	Mads Agger (to (Poland) Pogoń Szczecin)
27	GK	DEN	Benicio Peña (free agent)
32	DF	DEN	Alberto Vogtmann (on loan to Roskilde)
—	DF	DEN	Gustav Wagner (on loan to Thisted, previously on loan at Brønshøj)
—	FW	CMR	Ivan Djantou (to (Norway) Aalesund, previously on loan at (Norway) Odd)

=== Vejle ===
In:

No.	Pos.	Nation	Player
15	DF	GEO	Luka Latsabidze (on loan from (Ukraine) Shakhtar Donetsk, previously on loan at (Georgia (country)) Dinamo Tbilisi)
28	FW	GHA	Ransford Amoo (from (Ghana) True Life)

Out:

No.	Pos.	Nation	Player
22	DF	DEN	Anders Sønderskov (to Esbjerg)
25	DF	CRO	Luka Hujber (to (Bosnia and Herzegovina) Sarajevo)
28	MF	DEN	Tobias Lykkebak (to AB)
29	FW	ALG	Amin Chiakha (loan return to Copenhagen)

=== OB ===
In:

No.	Pos.	Nation	Player
10	MF	FIN	Anssi Suhonen (from (Germany) Hamburger SV, previously on loan at (Sweden) Öster)

Out:

No.	Pos.	Nation	Player
26	FW	DEN	Elias Hansborg-Sørensen (to Fredericia)

=== Fredericia ===
In:

No.	Pos.	Nation	Player
25	FW	NGR	Friday Etim (from Midtjylland)
29	FW	DEN	Elias Hansborg-Sørensen (from OB)
90	GK	DEN	Valdemar Birksø (from (Norway) Fredrikstad)

Out:

No.	Pos.	Nation	Player
1	GK	FRO	Mattias Lamhauge (to (Norway) Strømsgodset)
2	DF	DEN	Daniel Thøgersen (on loan to Skive)
22	FW	DEN	Martin Huldahl (to Hobro)

== 1. Division ==
Note: Flags indicate national team as has been defined under FIFA eligibility rules. Players may hold more than one non-FIFA nationality.

=== Lyngby ===
In:

No.	Pos.	Nation	Player
12	DF	USA	Neil Pierre (on loan from (United States) Philadelphia Union)
15	DF	DEN	Nicklas Mouritsen (from B.93)
16	FW	DEN	Asbjørn Bøndergaard (from Silkeborg)
18	MF	DEN	Jens Jakob Thomasen (from (Sweden) Elfsborg)
25	DF	BEL	Renzo Tytens (from (Belgium) Club NXT)
30	DF	DEN	Mikkel Fischer (from (Norway) Haugesund)

Out:

No.	Pos.	Nation	Player
4	DF	DEN	Luka Racic (loan return to (Norway) Rosenborg)
16	DF	DEN	Johan Meyer (to (Norway) Start)
18	FW	DEN	Jesper Cornelius (to (Norway) Start)
22	MF	DEN	Peter Langhoff (to (Sweden) Djurgården)
25	DF	DEN	Gustav Mortensen (to (Belgium) Standard Liège)

=== AaB ===
In:

No.	Pos.	Nation	Player
14	FW	DEN	Mathias Kubel (from Aarhus Fremad)

Out:

No.	Pos.	Nation	Player
10	FW	DEN	Oliver Ross (to Silkeborg)
21	MF	DEN	Mads Bomholt (to (Norway) Rosenborg)
39	FW	DEN	Bertram Skovgaard (on loan to (Italy) Lecce Primavera)

=== Horsens ===
In:

No.	Pos.	Nation	Player
15	FW	FRO	Adrian Justinussen (from Hillerød)
21	FW	SEN	Mansour Samb (from (France) Les Sables VF)

Out:

No.	Pos.	Nation	Player
11	FW	DEN	Sebastian Pingel (to (Norway) Strømsgodset)
19	FW	COD	Aime Azende (to (Republic of Ireland) Bray Wanderers)
—	GK	DEN	Andreas Hermansen (to (Sweden) GAIS, previously on loan at (Norway) Egersund)

=== Kolding ===
In:

No.	Pos.	Nation	Player
1	GK	CZE	Jakub Trefil (on loan from (Czech Republic) Sigma Olomouc)
2	DF	DEN	Lasse Laursen (from Skive)
11	FW	PAK	Abdul Arshad (from Brønshøj)
19	MF	DEN	Hans Høllsberg (from Fremad Amager)

Out:

No.	Pos.	Nation	Player
2	DF	DEN	Jakob Vadstrup (to (Norway) Odd)
11	MF	DEN	Abdoulie Njai (to Helsingør)
13	DF	NZL	Dalton Wilkins (loan return to Sønderjyske)
14	MF	DEN	Christoffer Palm (retired)
15	MF	ISL	Jóhannes Kristinn Bjarnason (to (Iceland) Víkingur)
19	FW	DEN	Casper Holmelund (to Helsingør)
77	FW	SWE	Samuel Burakovsky (loan return to (Norway) Bodø/Glimt)
99	GK	GER	Lennart Moser (to (Japan) Fagiano Okayama)
—	FW	FIN	Momodou Sarr (to (Finland) Lahti, previously on loan at (Finland) Inter Turku)

=== Hvidovre ===
In:

No.	Pos.	Nation	Player
7	FW	DEN	Louka Prip (from (Poland) Jagiellonia Białystok)

Out:

No.	Pos.	Nation	Player
10	MF	DEN	Martin Spelmann (retired)
12	MF	DEN	Frederik Holst (to Fremad Amager)
16	FW	SWE	Adam Larsson (to (Finland) Mariehamn)
26	MF	DEN	Emil Borella (to Brønshøj)

=== Esbjerg ===
In:

No.	Pos.	Nation	Player
5	DF	DEN	Jonathan Foss (from (Netherlands) Roda JC)
15	DF	DEN	Anders Sønderskov (from Vejle)
25	DF	RSA	Waylon Renecke (on loan from Copenhagen U19, previously on loan at (Sweden) Örgryte)

Out:

No.	Pos.	Nation	Player
2	DF	DEN	Jacob Buus (to (Norway) Odd)
5	DF	DEN	Andreas Troelsen (to (Sweden) Brommapojkarna)
9	FW	DEN	Jakob Ankersen (retired)
15	DF	DEN	Tobias Stagaard (to (Sweden) Brage)
34	GK	DEN	Emil Jørgensen (on loan to (Norway) Skeid)

=== Hillerød ===
In:

No.	Pos.	Nation	Player
9	FW	DEN	Frederik Heiselberg (from (Norway) Aalesund)
13	DF	DEN	Sebastian Larsen (from Køge)
17	DF	DEN	Mads Julø (from Fremad Amager)
19	MF	DEN	Rezan Corlu (free agent)
23	FW	FRO	Pætur Petersen (from (Faroe Islands) B36 Tórshavn)

Out:

No.	Pos.	Nation	Player
2	DF	DEN	Rasmus Møller (to (Norway) Haugesund)
9	FW	DEN	Jannik Pohl (free agent)
17	FW	FRO	Adrian Justinussen (to Horsens)
24	DF	DEN	Victor Dedes (to (Norway) Strømsgodset)
27	DF	DEN	Jonas Lyshøj (to Fremad Amager)
34	MF	ITA	Alessio Alicino (to HIK)

=== Hobro ===
In:

No.	Pos.	Nation	Player
14	MF	DEN	Lukas Falk (free agent)
22	FW	DEN	Martin Huldahl (from Fredericia)
29	DF	DEN	Mathias Haarup (from Vendsyssel)

Out:

No.	Pos.	Nation	Player
10	FW	DEN	Villads Rasmussen (to (Norway) Odd)
22	DF	DEN	Max Nielsen (to (Sweden) Mjällby)

=== B.93 ===
In:

No.	Pos.	Nation	Player
4	DF	SWE	Wilhelm Nilsson (from (Sweden) Helsingborg)
14	FW	DEN	Lulian Jakupi (from Næstved)
18	DF	DEN	Christoffer Henriksen (from HIK)
19	DF	GHA	Joseph Kinful (from Ishøj)

Out:

No.	Pos.	Nation	Player
3	DF	DEN	Nicklas Mouritsen (to Lyngby)
4	DF	DEN	Osvald Søe (to (United States) San Diego FC)
10	FW	DEN	Osman Addo (to Viborg)
19	FW	DEN	Andreas Bredahl (to Fremad Amager)
27	MF	DEN	Nicolaj Thomsen (retired)

=== Køge ===
In:

No.	Pos.	Nation	Player
9	FW	DEN	Tobias Thomsen (from (Iceland) Breiðablik)
27	MF	DEN	Marcel Rømer (from (Iceland) KA)

Out:

No.	Pos.	Nation	Player
3	DF	DEN	Sebastian Larsen (to Hillerød)
27	FW	DEN	Ifenna Dorgu (free agent)
30	MF	DEN	Lukas Schmidt (to Vejgaard)

=== Aarhus Fremad ===
In:

No.	Pos.	Nation	Player
—	FW	DEN	Lucas Riisgaard (from Næstved)
—	GK	DEN	Viktor de Paoli (on loan from AGF U19)
—	FW	NGR	Yusuf Abdullahi (from (Nigeria) Sporting Lagos)
—	MF	DEN	Marcus Ryberg (from (Finland) Gnistan)

Out:

No.	Pos.	Nation	Player
17	FW	DEN	Mathias Kubel (to AaB)
22	FW	DEN	Sebastian Buch (to VSK Aarhus)
23	DF	DEN	Oliver Andreasen (to Thisted)

=== Middelfart ===
In:

No.	Pos.	Nation	Player
2	DF	GER	Peter Matiebel (from (Germany) Hertha BSC II)
8	MF	DEN	Matthias Præst (from (Iceland) KR)
16	GK	DEN	Jonathan Hutters (from AGF)
20	MF	DEN	Rasmus Koch (from Vejle U19)
71	DF	DEN	Victor Laursen (free agent)

Out:

No.	Pos.	Nation	Player
2	DF	DEN	Søren Reese (retired)
8	MF	ALB	Bardhec Bytyqi (free agent)
16	GK	DEN	Albert Gaub-Jakobsen (to Næstved)
20	MF	DEN	Lukas Eg Jørgensen (to Marienlyst)
22	DF	DEN	Christian Boyum (to (Germany) OSC Bremerhaven)
23	MF	DEN	Valdemar Kwasniak (to Marienlyst)

== See also ==
- 2025–26 Danish Superliga
- 2025–26 Danish 1st Division
