= 2026 IL Hødd season =

Hødd
2026 season
- Chairman: Jan Arild Roppen
- Head coach: Ivan Poulsen
- Stadium: Høddvoll
- 1. divisjon: 11th
- 2026–27 Norwegian Cup: Pre-season
Home colours	Away colours	Third colours

The 2026 season is the 107th season in the history of Idrottslaget Hødd and the second consecutive season in the Norwegian First Division. In addition, the club will participate in the 2026–27 Norwegian Football Cup.

== Transfers ==
=== In ===
Pos.	Player	Transferred from	Fee	Date	Source
MF	(Norway) Ola Lerheim Olsen	(Norway) Fjøra		29 December 2025	
FW	(Denmark) Sebastian Biller	(Denmark) Silkeborg	Loan	30 January 2026	
FW	(Norway) Sean Nilsen-Modebe	(Norway) Tromsø IL	Loan	30 January 2026	
FW	(Denmark) Villum Dalsgaard	(Denmark) Nordsjælland	Loan	17 February 2026	
GK	(Norway) Aksel Bergsvik	(Norway) Viking		11 February 2026	
GK	(Norway) Thomas Kinn	(Finland) AC Oulu		25 February 2026	
FW	(Sweden) Cameron Streete	(Sweden) Landskrona BoIS		31 March 2026	

=== Out ===
Pos.	Player	Transferred to	Fee	Date	Source
FW	(Norway) Magnus Holte	(Norway) Rosenborg	Loan return	31 December 2025	
MF	(Norway) Ola Visted	(Norway) Viking	Loan return	31 December 2025	
DF	(Norway) Tage Johansen			1 January 2026	
GK	(Norway) Ole-Monrad Alme	(Norway) Hareid IL		20 January 2026	
GK	(Norway) Marius Ulla	(Norway) Stabæk		20 January 2026	
FW	(Norway) Sebastian Haugland	(Iceland) Þór Akureyri		27 March 2026	
DF	(Norway) Noah Jenssen Riise	(Norway) Pors Fotball	Loan	14 May 2026	

== Pre-season and friendlies ==
23 January 2026	Kristiansund (Norway)	0–0	(Norway) Hødd

30 January 2026	Hødd (Norway)	0–2	(Norway) Brattvåg

6 February 2026	Hødd (Norway)	0–2	(Norway) Aalesund

11 February 2026	Hødd (Norway)	1–0	(Norway) Træff

17 February 2026	Juventud Torremolinos (Spain)	3–1	(Norway) Hødd

28 February 2026	Hødd (Norway)	1–5	(Norway) Sogndal

21 March 2026	Åsane (Norway)	0–1	(Norway) Hødd

1 April 2026	Aalesund (Norway)	1–1	(Norway) Hødd

== Competitions ==
=== Overall record ===
Competition	First match	Last match	Starting round	Record							
Competition	First match	Last match	Starting round	Pld	W	D	L	GF	GA	GD	Win %
Norwegian First Division	7 April 2026		Matchday 1	11	4	2	5	14	15	−1	36.36
2026–27 Norwegian Football Cup				0	0	0	0	0	0	+0	—
Total				11	4	2	5	14	15	−1	36.36

Source: Competitions

=== Norwegian First Division ===
Pos	Team	Pld	W	D	L	GF	GA	GD	Pts
9	Egersund	12	5	1	6	19	21	−2	16
10	Bryne	12	5	1	6	18	20	−2	16
11	Hødd	12	4	3	5	14	15	−1	15
12	Sogndal	12	3	3	6	20	29	−9	12
13	Raufoss	12	3	1	8	16	28	−12	10

Updated to match(es) played on 21 June 2026. Source: OBOS-ligaen (in Norwegian)
Rules for classification: 1) Points; 2) Goal difference; 3) Goals scored; 4) Head-to-head points; 5) Head-to-head goal difference; 6) Head-to-head goals scored.

==== Results summary ====
Overall								Home						Away					
Pld	W	D	L	GF	GA	GD	Pts	W	D	L	GF	GA	GD	W	D	L	GF	GA	GD
0	0	0	0	0	0	0	0	0	0	0	0	0	0	0	0	0	0	0	0

==== Results by round ====
Round	1	2	3	4	5	6	7	8	9	10
Ground	H	A	H	A	H	A	H	A	H	A
Result	W	L	L	D	W	W	D	L	W	L
Position										

A = Away; H = Home; W = Win; D = Draw; L = Loss

==== Matches ====
The match schedule was issued on 19 December 2025.

7 April 2026 1	Hødd	2–1	Sandnes Ulf

12 April 2026 2	Moss	1–0	Hødd

18 April 2026 3	Hødd	0–2	Haugesund

26 April 2026 4	Raufoss	1–1	Hødd

1 May 2026 5	Hødd	1–0	Åsane

10 May 2026 6	Strømmen	1–2	Hødd

16 May 2026 7	Hødd	2–2	Sogndal

20 May 2026 8	Ranheim	3–2	Hødd

25 May 2026 9	Hødd	3–1	Egersund

31 May 2026 10	Bryne	1–0	Hødd

14 June 2026 11	Hødd	1–2	Kongsvinger	Ulsteinvik
16:00				Stadium: Høddvoll Stadion

21 June 2026 12	Odd	0–0	Hødd	Skien
16:00				Stadium: Skagerak Arena

4 July 2026 14	Hødd	4–3	Strømsgodset	Ulsteinvik
16:00

=== Norwegian Football Cup ===
22–23 August 2026 First round	Spjelkavik	v	Hødd
