= Callum McCowatt =

New Zealand footballer (born 1999)

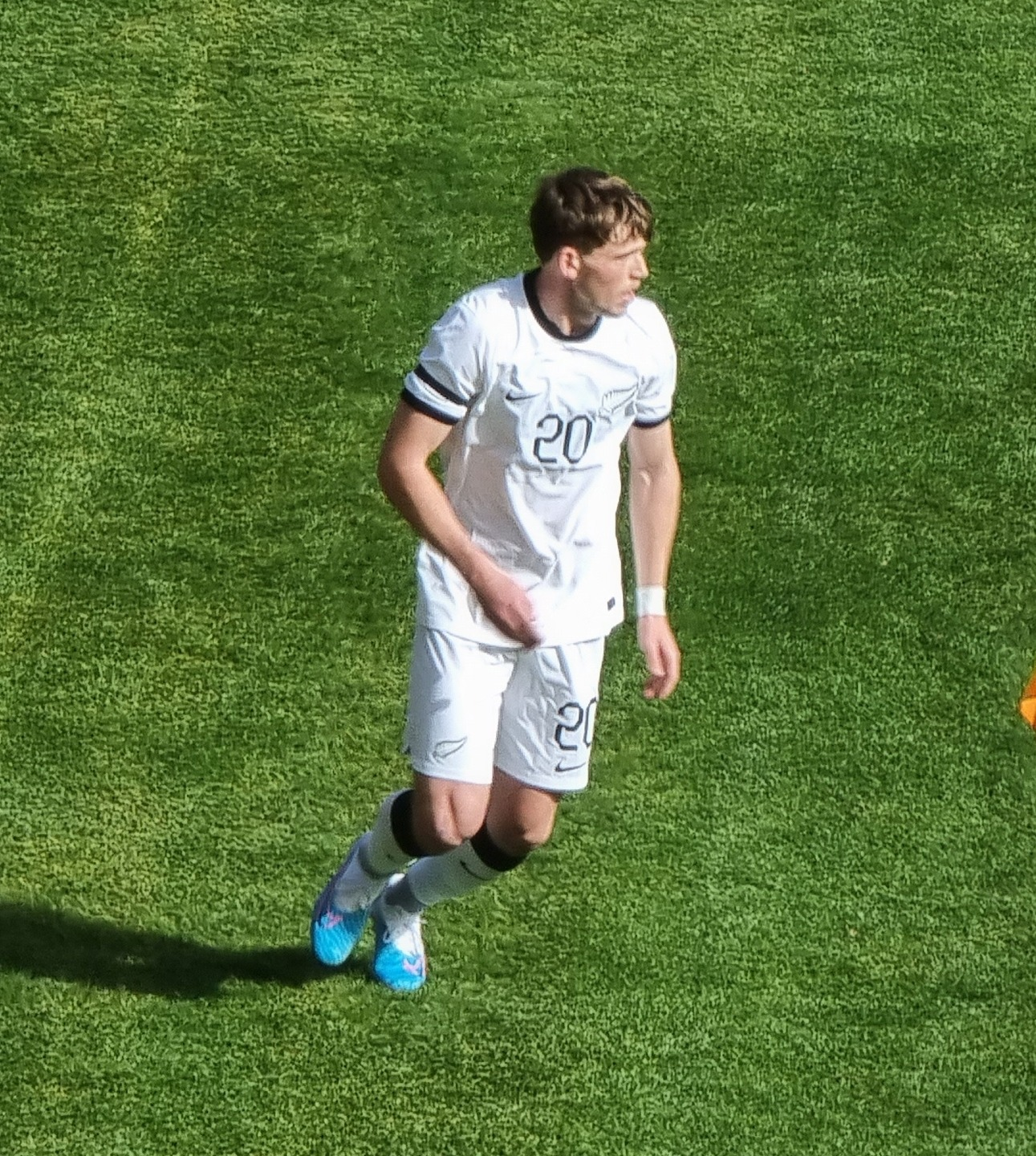
- McCowatt with New Zealand in 2023

Personal information
- Full name: Callum William McCowatt
- Date of birth: 30 April 1999 (age 27)
- Place of birth: Auckland, New Zealand
- Height: 1.79 m (5 ft 10 in)
- Position: Left winger

Team information
- Current team: AGF
- Number: 18

Youth career
- –2012: Greenhithe
- 2013: Forrest Hill Milford United
- 2013–2014: East Coast Bays
- 2016: Team Wellington

Senior career*
Years	Team	Apps	(Gls)
2015–2018	Western Suburbs	55	(30)
2017–2018	Auckland City	20	(9)
2018–2019	Eastern Suburbs	16	(21)
2019–2020	Wellington Phoenix	25	(1)
2020–2023	Helsingør	81	(18)
2023–2026	Silkeborg	91	(23)
2026–	AGF	3	(1)

International career^{‡}
2015	New Zealand U17	4	(0)
2017–2019	New Zealand U20	5	(0)
2021	New Zealand U23	6	(0)
2019–	New Zealand	37	(4)
- * Club domestic league appearances and goals as of 09:50, 24 September 2026 (UTC) ‡ National team caps and goals as of 17:38, 28 September 2026 (UTC)

Callum William McCowatt (born 30 April 1999) is a New Zealand professional footballer who plays as a left winger for Danish Superliga club AGF and the New Zealand national team.

== Club career ==
Following his graduation from Westlake Boys High School, McCowatt joined the Olé Football Academy in early 2015, playing league football for Olé-affiliated club Western Suburbs. During his time with the academy, McCowatt was named in the youth squad of Team Wellington for the 2016 National Youth League season.

=== Auckland City ===
Following his time at Western Suburbs, McCowatt moved to ISPS Handa Premiership club Auckland City along with fellow Olé graduates Dalton Wilkins and Owen Parker-Price on 26 September 2017. Though he was originally intended for the youth team, McCowatt eventually started every game Auckland City played that season, including the FIFA Club World Cup and OFC Champions League campaigns. McCowatt scored the only goal in the grand final as Auckland City defeated Team Wellington 1–0 to lift the league title.

Following McCowatt's success in his debut season, in which he formed an attacking trio with Ryan de Vries and Emiliano Tade, he earned a trial with Eredivisie club Sparta Rotterdam, but was not offered a contract.

=== Eastern Suburbs ===
On 21 November 2018, McCowatt continued his relationship with the Olé academy, signing with affiliated club Eastern Suburbs. He scored 21 goals in 16 appearances in the 2018–19 season, including a hat-trick in the grand final against Team Wellington which his team won 3–0. He was awarded the Steve Sumner Trophy for player of the match.

=== Wellington Phoenix ===
On 26 June 2019, it was announced that McCowatt signed with the Wellington Phoenix who play in the A-League on a one-year deal. McCowatt scored his first goal for the Phoenix in their FFA Cup lost to the Brisbane Strikers before he made his professional debut in a 0–1 loss to Western United in the Phoenix season opener.

=== Helsingør ===
On 6 September 2020, McCowatt signed a contract with Helsingør who play in the Danish 1st Division. On 18 October 2020, McCowatt made his debut for FC Helsingør, when he was substituted on in the 70th minute. McCowatt scored his first goal for the club against HB Køge in the Danish 1st Division promotion group match.

=== Silkeborg ===
After three seasons at Helsingør, Danish Superliga club Silkeborg confirmed on 4 July 2023, that McCowatt had joined the club on a deal until the end of 2027. McCowatt made his Silkeborg debut on 23 July 2023 in the season opener against Brøndby, being substituted on in the 82nd minute. On 4 August 2023, McCowatt scored his first goal for Silkeborg in a 2–1 league win over Vejle.

On 21 September 2025, McCowatt scored his first hat-trick for Silkeborg in a 3–3 away draw against Copenhagen in the Superliga. On 9 December, he was named Silkeborg Player of the Year for 2025.

=== AGF ===
On 1 September 2026, McCowatt signed for fellow Danish Superliga club AGF on a contract until the summer of 2030.

== International career ==
McCowatt got his first international call-up for the New Zealand U17 team for the 2015 FIFA U-17 World Cup. He played four matches, starting in one. McCowatt was named in the New Zealand U20 squad for the 2019 FIFA U-20 World Cup. He was named in the starting lineup in 3 matches but failed to score.

McCowatt made his senior international debut on 15 November 2019, starting for New Zealand in a friendly against Ireland. McCowatt opened the scoring, marking his first ever goal for the national team, before New Zealand went on to lose 1–3.

On 25 June 2021, McCowatt was called up to the Tokyo 2020 Olympics with the New Zealand U23s. He made his Olympics debut on 22 July 2021 in the OlyWhites' first ever Olympic win, a 1–0 victory against South Korea.

On 14 May 2026, McCowatt was selected in the 26-man squad for the 2026 FIFA World Cup.

== Career statistics ==
=== Club ===
As of match played 20 September 2026

Appearances and goals by club, season and competition
Club	Season	League			National cup (Note: Includes Australia Cup, Danish Cup)		Continental		Other		Total	
Club	Season	Division	Apps	Goals	Apps	Goals	Apps	Goals	Apps	Goals	Apps	Goals
Auckland City	2017–18	Premiership	18	7	—		6 (Note: Appearances in OFC Champions League)	2	3 (Note: Two appearances and two goals in New Zealand Football Championship play-offs, one appearance in FIFA Club World Cup)	2	27	11
Eastern Suburbs	2018–19	Premiership	14	18	—		—		2 (Note: Appearances in New Zealand Football Championship play-offs)	3	16	21
Wellington Phoenix Reserves	2019–20	Premiership	1	0	—		—		—		1	0
Wellington Phoenix	2019–20	A-League	25	1	1	1	—		1 (Note: Appearance in A-League Finals)	0	27	2
Helsingør	2020–21	Danish 1st Division	24	3	—		—		—		24	3
Helsingør	2021–22	Danish 1st Division	27	6	2	0	—		—		29	6
Helsingør	2022–23	Danish 1st Division	30	9	3	1	—		—		33	10
Helsingør	Total		81	18	5	1	—		—		86	19
Silkeborg	2023–24	Danish Superliga	32	5	8	3	—		—		40	8
Silkeborg	2024–25	Danish Superliga	22	5	6	2	0	0	1 (Note: Appearance in Danish Superliga European play-off match)	1	29	8
Silkeborg	2025–26	Danish Superliga	32	11	1	0	4 (Note: Appearances in UEFA Conference League)	1	—		37	12
Silkeborg	2026–27	Danish Superliga	5	2	0	0	—		—		5	2
Silkeborg	Total		91	23	15	5	4	1	1	1	111	30
AGF	2026–27	Danish Superliga	3	1	1	2	0	0	—		4	3
Career total			233	68	22	9	10	3	7	6	272	86

=== International ===
As of match played 28 September 2026

Appearances and goals by national team and year
National team	Year	Apps	Goals
New Zealand	2019	1	1
New Zealand	2021	3	0
New Zealand	2022	6	0
New Zealand	2023	7	1
New Zealand	2024	4	2
New Zealand	2025	7	0
New Zealand	2026	9	0
Total		37	4

As of match played on 14 October 2025
New Zealand score listed first, score column indicates score after each McCowatt goal

List of international goals scored by Callum McCowatt
No.	Cap	Date	Venue	Opponent	Score	Result	Competition
1	1	14 November 2019	Aviva Stadium, Dublin, Republic of Ireland	Republic of Ireland	1–0	1–3	Friendly
2	12	16 June 2023	Friends Arena, Stockholm, Sweden	Sweden	1–0	1–4	Friendly
3	20	15 November 2024	Waikato Stadium, Hamilton, New Zealand	Vanuatu	8–1	8–1	2026 FIFA World Cup qualification
4	21	18 November 2024	Mount Smart Stadium, Auckland, New Zealand	Samoa	1–0	8–0	2026 FIFA World Cup qualification

== Honours ==
Auckland City

- New Zealand Football Championship Premiership: 2017–18
- New Zealand Football Championship Championship: 2017–18

Eastern Suburbs

- New Zealand Football Championship Championship: 2018–19

Silkeborg

- Danish Cup: 2023–24

Individual

- League top-goalscorer: New Zealand Football Championship 2018–19
- Steve Sumner Trophy: 2017–18, 2018–19
- Silkeborg Player of the Year: 2025
