= Mads Larsen =

Mads Larsen may refer to:

- Mads Larsen (boxer)
- Mads Larsen (footballer)
- Mads Mensah Larsen, Danish handball player
