= Robin Østrøm =

Norwegian footballer (born 2002)

Personal information
- Full name: Robin Dahl Østrøm
- Date of birth: 9 August 2002 (age 24)
- Place of birth: Copenhagen, Denmark
- Height: 1.85 m (6 ft 1 in)
- Positions: Right-back; centre-back

Team information
- Current team: Silkeborg
- Number: 3

Youth career
- 2009–2016: AB Tårnby
- 2016–2020: B.93
- 2020–2021: OB

Senior career*
Years	Team	Apps	(Gls)
2020–2022	OB	30	(1)
2022–	Silkeborg	106	(0)

International career
2020	Denmark U19	1	(0)
2022	Norway U20	4	(1)
2021–2024	Norway U21	13	(2)
- * Club domestic league appearances and goals as of 16:07, 15 November 2026 (UTC)

Robin Dahl Østrøm (born 9 August 2002) is a professional footballer who plays as a right-back or centre-back for and captains Danish Superliga club Silkeborg. Born in Denmark, he represents the Norway national under-21 team.

== Club career ==
Østrøm made his senior debut for Odense Boldklub, before joining Silkeborg in 2022. In December 2024 he extended his contract with Silkeborg until January 2028.

== International career ==
Østrøm was born in Denmark to a Norwegian father and Ugandan mother. He earned one cap for Denmark at under-19 level, before switching his allegiance and opting to play for Norway in 2021. He has been capped for them at U20 and U21 levels.

== Personal life ==
Østrøm was born in Denmark to a Ugandan mother and a Norwegian father. He grew up in Copenhagen.

== Career statistics ==
As of match played 6 November 2026

Appearances and goals by club, season and competition
Club	Season	League			Cup		Continental		Other		Total		
Club	Season	Division	Apps	Goals	Apps	Goals	Apps	Goals	Apps	Goals	Apps	Goals	
OB	2019–20	Danish Superliga	6	0	0	0	—		—		6	0	
OB	2020–21	Danish Superliga	12	0	4	0	—		—		16	0	
OB	2021–22	Danish Superliga	11	0	4	0	—		—		15	0	
OB	2022–23	Danish Superliga	1	1	0	0	—		—		1	1	
OB	Total		30	1	8	0	—		—		38	1	
Silkeborg	2022–23	Danish Superliga	11	0	6	0	2 (Note: Appearances in UEFA Europa Conference League)	0	—		19	0	
Silkeborg	2023–24	Danish Superliga	20	0	4	0	—		—		24	0	
Silkeborg	2024–25	Danish Superliga	31	0	5	0	4 (Note: Two appearances in UEFA Europa League, two appearances in UEFA Conference League)	0	1 (Note: Appearance in Danish Superliga European play-off match)	0	41	0	
Silkeborg	2025–26	Danish Superliga	30	0	3	0	3 (Note: Appearances in UEFA Conference League)	0	0	0	36	0	
Silkeborg	2026–27	Danish Superliga	14	0	1	0	—		0	0	0	15	0
Silkeborg	Total		106	0	19	0	9	0	1	0	135	0	
Career total			136	1	27	0	9	0	1	0	173	1	

== Honours ==
Silkeborg

- Danish Cup: 2023–24
