= Sofus Berger =

Danish footballer (born 2003)

Personal information
- Full name: Sofus Berger Brix
- Date of birth: 2 June 2003 (age 23)
- Place of birth: Viborg, Denmark
- Height: 1.75 m (5 ft 9 in)
- Position: Midfielder

Team information
- Current team: Silkeborg
- Number: 14

Youth career
- 2008–2014: Overlund GF
- 2014–2019: Viborg

Senior career*
Years	Team	Apps	(Gls)
2019–2025	Viborg	79	(2)
2023–2024	→ Fredericia (loan)	29	(4)
2025–	Silkeborg	37	(0)

International career
2020	Denmark U18	2	(0)
2021–2022	Denmark U19	6	(0)
- * Club domestic league appearances and goals as of 16:10, 15 November 2026 (UTC)

Sofus Berger Brix (born 2 June 2003) is a Danish professional footballer who plays as a midfielder for Danish Superliga club Silkeborg.

== Career ==
=== Viborg ===
Born in Viborg, Berger began playing for Overlund GF at age 5 before moving to the Viborg FF academy at U13 level.

On 6 August 2019, Berger made his senior debut in the first round of the Danish Cup in a 2–1 away win after extra-time over Jammerbugt. He made his league debut in the Danish 1st Division – the second tier of Danish football – a few days later on 11 August in a 0–0 draw against HB Køge, coming on as a substitute in the 80th minute for Mikkel Agger. He scored his first goal on 19 July 2020 in a 1–1 draw against Vejle.

Being part of the Viborg team winning promotion to the Danish Superliga in the 2020–21 season, Berger made his debut at the highest level on 18 July 2021 as a starter in a 2–1 away win over Nordsjælland.

He made his European debut on 21 July 2022, coming on as a late substitute in the UEFA Europa Conference League qualifier against Sūduva and slotting home to 1–0 winner shortly after.

On 4 August 2023, Viborg confirmed that Berger - in pursuit of more playing time - moved to Fredericia on a season-long loan deal. At the same time, he extended his contract with Viborg until the end of 2025. In the summer of 2024, Berger was back in Viborg.

=== Silkeborg ===
On 1 February 2025, Danish Superliga side Silkeborg announced the signing of Berger on a contract until the end of 2028. On 14 August, he scored his first goal for the club in a 2–2 away draw against Jagiellonia Białystok in the UEFA Conference League third qualifying round.

== Career statistics ==
As of match played 6 November 2026

Appearances and goals by club, season and competition
Club	Season	League			Danish Cup		Europe		Other		Total	
Club	Season	Division	Apps	Goals	Apps	Goals	Apps	Goals	Apps	Goals	Apps	Goals
Viborg	2019–20	Danish 1st Division	15	1	3	0	—		—		18	1
Viborg	2020–21	Danish 1st Division	25	1	1	0	—		—		26	1
Viborg	2021–22	Danish Superliga	22	0	0	0	—		—		22	0
Viborg	2022–23	Danish Superliga	13	0	4	0	5 (Note: Appearance(s) in UEFA Europa Conference League/UEFA Conference League)	1	—		22	1
Viborg	2023–24	Danish Superliga	1	0	—		—		—		1	0
Viborg	2024–25	Danish Superliga	3	0	2	1	—		—		5	1
Viborg	Total		79	2	10	1	5	1	—		94	4
Fredericia (loan)	2023–24	Danish 1st Division	29	4	7	2	—		—		36	6
Silkeborg	2024–25	Danish Superliga	8	0	0	0	—		0	0	8	0
Silkeborg	2025–26	Danish Superliga	20	0	1	0	1	1	—		22	1
Silkeborg	2026–27	Danish Superliga	9	0	1	0	—		0	0	10	0
Silkeborg	Total		37	0	2	0	1	1	0	0	40	1
Career total			145	6	19	3	6	2	0	0	170	11

== Honours ==
Viborg

- Danish 1st Division: 2020–21
