= Pedro Ganchas =

Portuguese footballer (born 2000)

Personal information
- Full name: Pedro Luís Machado Ganchas
- Date of birth: 31 May 2000 (age 26)
- Place of birth: Lisbon, Portugal
- Height: 1.90 m (6 ft 3 in)
- Position: Centre-back

Team information
- Current team: Silkeborg
- Number: 4

Youth career
- 2008–2011: Carregado
- 2011–2022: Benfica
- 2015–2016: → Carregado (loan)
- 2016–2018: → Sacavenense (loan)

Senior career*
Years	Team	Apps	(Gls)
2020–2022	Benfica B	32	(4)
2022–2024	Paços de Ferreira	36	(2)
2024–	Silkeborg	60	(3)

International career
2017	Portugal U17	2	(0)
2018	Portugal U18	2	(0)
2019	Portugal U19	4	(0)
2019	Portugal U20	1	(0)
- * Club domestic league appearances and goals as of 16:08, 15 November 2026 (UTC)

Pedro Luís Machado Ganchas (born 31 May 2000) is a Portuguese professional footballer who plays as a centre-back for Danish Superliga club Silkeborg.

== Club career ==
On 31 January 2022, Ganchas left Benfica B and signed a three-and-a-half-year contract for Primeira Liga club Paços de Ferreira.

On 2 July 2024, Danish Superliga club Silkeborg confirmed that Ganchas had joined the club on a deal until the end of 2028. On 25 September, he scored his first goal for the club in a 3–1 away win against Roskilde in the Danish Cup third round. On 25 October, he scored his first goal in the Danish Superliga in a 1–1 home draw against AaB.

On 17 September 2025, Ganchas scored in Silkeborg's 5–0 away win against Kolding Boldklub in the Danish Cup.

== Career statistics ==
As of match played 6 November 2026

Club	Season	League			National Cup		League Cup		Europe		Other		Total	
Club	Season	Division	Apps	Goals	Apps	Goals	Apps	Goals	Apps	Goals	Apps	Goals	Apps	Goals
Benfica B	2020–21	Liga Portugal 2	21	3	—		—		—		—		21	3
Benfica B	2021–22	Liga Portugal 2	11	1	—		—		—		—		11	1
Benfica B	Total		32	4	—		—		—		—		32	4
Paços Ferreira	2021–22	Primeira Liga	2	0	—		—		—		—		2	0
Paços Ferreira	2022–23	Primeira Liga	5	0	—		1	0	—		—		6	0
Paços Ferreira	2023–24	Liga Portugal 2	29	2	1	0	0	0	—		—		30	2
Paços Ferreira	Total		36	2	1	0	1	0	—		—		38	2
Silkeborg	2024–25	Danish Superliga	25	1	7	1	—		4 (Note: Two appearances in UEFA Europa League, two appearances in UEFA Conference League)	0	1 (Note: Appearance in Danish Superliga European play-off match)	0	37	2
Silkeborg	2025–26	Danish Superliga	29	2	3	1	—		3 (Note: Appearances in UEFA Conference League)	0	0	0	35	3
Silkeborg	2026–27	Danish Superliga	6	0	1	0	—		—		0	0	7	0
Silkeborg	Total		60	3	11	2	—		7	0	1	0	79	5
Career total			128	9	12	2	1	0	7	0	1	0	149	11
