= Adam Wikman =

Swedish footballer (born 2003)

Personal information
- Full name: Adam Oscar Magnus Wikman
- Date of birth: 15 December 2003 (age 22)
- Height: 1.78 m (5 ft 10 in)
- Position: Midfielder

Team information
- Current team: Silkeborg (on loan from IK Sirius)
- Number: 6

Youth career
- Danmarks IF
- –2021: IK Sirius

Senior career*
Years	Team	Apps	(Gls)
2021–	IK Sirius	68	(3)
2026	→ Silkeborg (loan)	13	(0)

International career
2023	Sweden U20	3	(0)
- * Club domestic league appearances and goals as of 19 May 2026

Adam Wikman (born 15 December 2003) is a Swedish professional footballer who plays as a midfielder for Allsvenskan club IK Sirius.

== Club career ==
Wikman started his youth career in Danmarks IF. He played youth football for IK Sirius and was given an apprenticeship with the senior team in September 2021. He then made his Allsvenskan debut in July 2021 against Malmö.

During the 2022 Allsvenskan, Wikman did not play at all, until suddenly starting the match against Hammarby in October. In November 2022 he signed a five-year contract, touted as a "new Jamie Roche".

On 16 January 2026, Danish Superliga club Silkeborg announced the signing of Wikman on a loan deal until the end of the 2025–26 season.

== International career ==
In May 2023, Wikman was called up for the first time to a Swedish youth national team, facing Liechtenstein. Later that year he played against Denmark twice.

== Personal life ==
Wikman is a son of Magnus Wikman, footballer and manager. Adam's brother Samuel made his Sirius debut before him, but later left Sirius. In the 2022–23 Svenska Cupen the brothers faced each other for the first time, as Samuel played for Sirius' opponent Dalkurd.
