= Alexander Simmelhack =

Danish footballer (born 2005)

Personal information
- Full name: Alexander Illum Simmelhack
- Date of birth: 11 November 2005 (age 20)
- Place of birth: Roskilde, Denmark
- Height: 1.88 m (6 ft 2 in)
- Position: Centre-forward

Team information
- Current team: IFK Göteborg
- Number: 7

Youth career
- –2021: Roskilde
- 2021–2022: Randers
- 2022–2024: Copenhagen
- 2023–2024: → AC Milan (loan)

Senior career*
| Years | Team | Apps | (Gls) |
| 2022 | Randers | 2 | (0) |
| 2024–2026 | Silkeborg | 42 | (6) |
| 2026– | IFK Göteborg | 3 | (2) |

International career^{‡}
| 2022 | Denmark U17 | 7 | (3) |
| 2022–2023 | Denmark U18 | 10 | (6) |
| 2024 | Denmark U19 | 7 | (3) |
| 2025 | Denmark U20 | 2 | (1) |
- * Club domestic league appearances and goals as of 18:59, 19 September 2026 (UTC) ‡ National team caps and goals as of 14:02, 10 June 2025 (UTC)

Alexander Illum Simmelhack (born 11 November 2005) is a Danish professional footballer who plays as a centre-forward for Allsvenskan club IFK Göteborg.

== Club career ==
=== Early career ===
Born in Roskilde, Alexander Simmelhack started his career local side FC Roskilde's youth team, where he played until the age of 15.

=== Randers ===
On 25 June 2021, Simmelhack was signed by Randers on a 3-year youth contract. On 24 June 2022, after one season with the youth team and two appearances for the senior side in the Danish Superliga, his contract was terminated after he expressed a desire to leave the club.

=== Copenhagen ===
Less than a month after leaving Randers, on 16 July 2022, Simmelhack joined fellow Danish Superliga club Copenhagen on a contract until 2025. During the 2022–23 season, he played for the Copenhagen under-19 and reserves.

==== Loan to AC Milan ====
On 30 August 2023, he was loaned out to AC Milan's youth team for the duration of the 2023–24 season, with an option for the deal to be made permanent. While at AC Milan, he reached the final of the UEFA Youth League, where his team lost 3–0 to Olympiacos.

=== Silkeborg ===
On 21 August 2024, Danish Superliga club Silkeborg announced the signing of Simmelhack on a contract until the end of 2027. He made his debut for the club on 25 August against Vejle in the Superliga, when he came on as a substitute for Younes Bakiz in the 87th minute, scoring the third goal of the match six minutes later to seal a 3–1 victory. In a match during the Superliga relegation round against Sønderjyske on 11 May 2025, he scored the only goal leading to Silkeborg's victory.

=== IFK Göteborg ===
On 31 August 2026, Allsvenskan club IFK Göteborg announced the signing of Simmelhack on a four-year deal. On 7 September, he scored on his debut for the club in a 4–1 away victory against Mjällby.

== Career statistics ==
As of match played 7 September 2026

Appearances and goals by club, season and competition
| Club | Season | League | | | Cup | | Continental | | Other | | Total | |
| Club | Season | Division | Apps | Goals | Apps | Goals | Apps | Goals | Apps | Goals | Apps | Goals |
|---|---|---|---|---|---|---|---|---|---|---|---|---|
| Randers | 2021–22 | Danish Superliga | 2 | 0 | 0 | 0 | — | | — | | 2 | 0 |
| Copenhagen | 2022–23 | Danish Superliga | 0 | 0 | 0 | 0 | — | | — | | 0 | 0 |
| Copenhagen | 2023–24 | Danish Superliga | 0 | 0 | 0 | 0 | — | | — | | 0 | 0 |
| Copenhagen | Total | | 0 | 0 | 0 | 0 | — | | — | | 0 | 0 |
| Silkeborg | 2024–25 | Danish Superliga | 23 | 5 | 5 | 1 | — | | 1 (Note: Appearance in Danish Superliga European play-off match) | 0 | 29 | 6 |
| Silkeborg | 2025–26 | Danish Superliga | 15 | 1 | 2 | 0 | 3 (Note: Appearances in UEFA Conference League) | 0 | 0 | 0 | 20 | 1 |
| Silkeborg | Total | | 38 | 6 | 7 | 1 | 3 | 0 | 1 | 0 | 49 | 7 |
| IFK Göteborg | 2026 | Allsvenskan | 1 | 1 | 0 | 0 | — | | — | | 1 | 1 |
| Career total | | | 41 | 7 | 7 | 1 | 3 | 0 | 1 | 0 | 52 | 8 |
