= Anders Sønderskov =

Danish footballer (born 2006)

Personal information
- Full name: Anders Sønderskov
- Date of birth: 11 April 2006 (age 20)
- Place of birth: Aabyhøj, Aarhus, Denmark
- Height: 1.87 m (6 ft 2 in)
- Position: Centre-back

Team information
- Current team: Esbjerg
- Number: 15

Youth career
- 2013–2019: Aabyhøj IF
- 2019–2022: AGF
- 2022–2025: Vejle

Senior career*
Years	Team	Apps	(Gls)
2023–2026	Vejle	6	(0)
2026–	Esbjerg	11	(0)
- * Club domestic league appearances and goals as of 2 June 2026

Anders Sønderskov (born 11 April 2006) is a Danish professional footballer who plays as a centre-back for Danish 1st Division club Esbjerg fB.

== Career ==
=== Vejle Boldklub ===
Born and raised in Aabyhøj, a neighborhood in Aarhus, Sønderskov started his career at Aabyhøj IF before later, as a U14 player, moving to AGF, where he spent a few years. In 2022, as a U17 player, he then transferred to Vejle Boldklub.

On November 1, 2023, 17-year-old Sønderskov made his official debut for Vejle when he was in the starting lineup for the Danish Cup match against AB. In the 2024 winter training camp, young Sønderskov joined the first team for a training camp in Turkey. After the break, he was also on the bench for the first time in the first Danish Superliga match after the break.

In May 2024, he extended his contract until June 2028 and was simultaneously permanently promoted to the first-team squad ahead of the upcoming 2024–25 season.

On May 24, 2025, Sønderskov made his official debut when he replaced Stefan Velkov in the 53rd minute.

=== Esbjerg fB ===
On 2 February 2026, Sønderskov signed a long-term contract with Danish 1st Division side Esbjerg fB until June 2029.

== Honours ==
Vejle

- Danish 1st Division: 2022–23
