= Asbjørn Bøndergaard =

Danish footballer (born 2004)

Personal information
- Full name: Asbjørn Johnsen Bøndergaard
- Date of birth: 5 May 2004 (age 22)
- Place of birth: Hvide Sande, Denmark
- Height: 1.84 m (6 ft 0 in)
- Position: Forward

Team information
- Current team: Lyngby
- Number: 16

Youth career
- –2019: Ringkøbing
- 2019–2024: Silkeborg

Senior career*
Years	Team	Apps	(Gls)
2023–2026	Silkeborg	9	(0)
2024–2025	→ Fredericia (loan)	23	(12)
2026–	Lyngby	13	(5)

International career
2020	Denmark U-16	5	(2)
2020	Denmark U-17	1	(0)
2021–2022	Denmark U-18	8	(3)
2022–2023	Denmark U-19	5	(2)
- * Club domestic league appearances and goals as of 2 June 2026

Asbjørn Johnsen Bøndergaard (born 5 May 2004) is a Danish professional footballer who plays as a forward for Danish Superliga club Lyngby.

== Career ==
=== Silkeborg ===
In the summer 2019, Bøndergaard joined Silkeborg from Ringkøbing. However, Bøndergaard played, already a year before the switch, on a so-called 'double license', where he trained 1-2 times a week in Silkeborg while still playing for Ringkøbing.

After joining the first team squad for a training camp in Spain in February 2023, Bøndergaard made his official debut for Silkeborg on 6 April 2023, when he came on for the last few minutes in a cup match against Sønderjyske. On 29 May 2023, he made his Danish Superliga debut in a match against FC Midtjylland. On 10 August 2023, Bøndergaard extended his deal with Silkeborg until June 2027.

In June 2024, Bøndergaard, along with teammate Oscar Fuglsang, was loaned out to Danish 1st Division club Fredericia for the upcoming season. In his first six games for Fredericia, Bøndergaard scored nine goals in all tournaments. After a season in which Bøndergaard helped Fredericia earn promotion to the 2025–26 Danish Superliga with 12 league goals, he returned to Silkeborg following the end of his loan spell.

On 17 September 2025, Bøndergaard scored a brace in Silkeborg's 5–0 away victory against Kolding Boldklub in the Danish Cup third round.

=== Lyngby ===
On 21 January 2026, Danish 1st Division club Lyngby announced the signing of Bøndergaard on a five-year contract. On 27 February, he marked his debut for the club with a goal against Kolding IF in the league.

== Honours ==
Silkeborg

- Danish Cup: 2023–24

Lyngby

- Danish 1st Division: 2025–26
