= Julius Berthel Askou =

Danish footballer (born 2006)

Personal information
- Full name: Julius Berthel Askou Harvey
- Date of birth: 27 May 2006 (age 20)
- Place of birth: Silkeborg, Denmark
- Height: 1.90 m (6 ft 3 in)
- Position: Centre-back

Team information
- Current team: OB
- Number: 13

Youth career
- –2022: Silkeborg
- 2022–2024: OB

Senior career*
Years	Team	Apps	(Gls)
2024–	OB	38	(2)

International career^{‡}
2023	Denmark U-17	2	(0)
2024	Denmark U-18	1	(0)
2024–2025	Denmark U-19	5	(0)
2025–	Denmark U-21	4	(0)
- * Club domestic league appearances and goals as of 19 May 2026 ‡ National team caps and goals as of 20:42, 25 January 2026 (UTC)

Julius Berthel Askou Harvey (born 27 May 2006) is a Danish professional footballer who plays as a centre-back for Danish Superliga club Odense Boldklub.

== Club career ==
Berthel Askou began his youth career at Silkeborg IF before joining OB in June 2022, signing a youth contract with the club at the age of 16.

After progressing through OB's youth ranks, Askou was promoted to the first-team squad in May 2024, signing a new three-year deal with the club also.

Berthel Askou made his first-team debut for OB on 27 October 2024, coming on as a substitute in OB's 2–1 win over Esbjerg fB in the Danish 1st Division.

Berthel Askou was part of the Odense Boldklub squad during the 2024–25 Danish 1st Division season, in which the club secured promotion back to the 2025–26 Danish Superliga. On 20 July 2025, in the opening league match of the season, Askou made his Danish Superliga debut, playing 35 minutes in a match against FC Midtjylland.

== International career ==
At international level, Askou has represented Denmark at various youth levels, including under-17, under-18, under-19 and under-21.

== Personal life ==
Julius Berthel Askou is the son of former professional footballer and coach Jens Berthel Askou.

== Honours ==
OB

- Danish 1st Division: 2024–25
