= Jeppe Kudsk =

Danish footballer (born 2003)

Personal information
- Full name: Jeppe Kudsk Pedersen
- Date of birth: 25 February 2003 (age 23)
- Place of birth: Holstebro, Denmark
- Height: 1.88 m (6 ft 2 in)
- Position: Centre-back

Team information
- Current team: Fredericia
- Number: 4

Youth career
- Holstebro
- 2018–2023: Randers

Senior career*
Years	Team	Apps	(Gls)
2023–2024	Randers	10	(0)
2024–	Fredericia	50	(3)

International career
2022	Denmark U-19	1	(0)
- * Club domestic league appearances and goals as of 19 May 2026

Jeppe Kudsk Pedersen (born 25 February 2003) is a Danish professional footballer who plays as a centre-back for Danish Superliga club Fredericia.

== Career ==
=== Randers ===
Kudsk joined Randers FC from Holstebro Boldklub in January 2018. Kudsk fought his way up through the youth ranks at Randers and made his debut for the club's first team on 27 October 2021, in a Danish Cup match against Middelfart Boldklub.

After his debut, Kudsk made no further appearances for Randers' first team until his Danish Superliga debut on 15 May 2023, where he played all 90 minutes against Viborg FF. Kudsk also played the following match against FC Nordsjælland.

In June 2023, Kudsk signed a two-year extension with Randers and was permanently promoted to the first team squad.

=== FC Fredericia ===
On 13 May 2024 the Danish 1st Division club FC Fredericia confirmed that Kudsk joined the club from the upcoming season on a deal until June 2027. In his first season he helped the club getting promoted to the Danish Superliga for the first time in club history existence.
