= Alexander Busch =

Danish footballer (born 2003)

Personal information
- Full name: Alexander Magnus Busch
- Date of birth: 25 July 2003 (age 23)
- Place of birth: Resenbro, Denmark
- Height: 1.90 m (6 ft 3 in)
- Position: Centre-back

Team information
- Current team: Silkeborg
- Number: 40

Youth career
- –2012: Resenbro UIF
- 2012–2021: Silkeborg

Senior career*
Years	Team	Apps	(Gls)
2021–	Silkeborg	46	(2)

International career
2022	Denmark U19	1	(0)
2022–2023	Denmark U20	3	(0)
2023	Denmark U21	2	(0)
- * Club domestic league appearances and goals as of 17:55, 10 December 2025 (UTC)

Alexander Magnus Busch (born 25 July 2003) is a Danish professional footballer who plays as a centre-back for Danish Superliga club Silkeborg.

== Career ==
=== Silkeborg ===
Busch joined Silkeborg in 2012 from Resenbro UIF at the age of 9. He signed his first three-year youth contract with the club in May 2020.

On 15 May 2021, Busch got his official debut for Silkeborg in the Danish 1st Division against HB Køge. He made a total of three appearances in that season, helping Silkeborg with promotion to the 2021–22 Danish Superliga. Busch was then promoted to the first team squad in the summer 2021. He made his Danish Superliga debut on 31 October against Sønderjyske. On 19 January 2022, Busch signed a new contract with Silkeborg until June 2026.

In February 2024, Busch suffered a groin injury, returning to action in September of the same year. He made his first start after recovering from injury, coming on as a late substitute in a 2–2 draw against Lyngby on 29 September in the Superliga.

On 10 July 2025, Busch signed a new contract with Silkeborg, extending his stay with the club until the end of 2027.

== Honours ==
Silkeborg

- Danish Cup: 2023–24

Individual

- Danish Superliga Team of the Month: October 2023
