= Laurits Pedersen =

Danish footballer (born 2006)

Personal information
- Full name: Laurits Raun Pedersen
- Date of birth: 25 January 2006 (age 20)
- Place of birth: Over Hornbæk, Denmark
- Height: 1.81 m (5 ft 11 in)
- Position: Midfielder

Team information
- Current team: Randers
- Number: 8

Youth career
- Hornbæk SF
- Randers Freja
- Randers

Senior career*
Years	Team	Apps	(Gls)
2024–	Randers	46	(0)

International career^{‡}
2022	Denmark U17	5	(0)
2025–	Denmark U19	3	(0)
- * Club domestic league appearances and goals as of 19 May 2026 ‡ National team caps and goals as of 18:29, 8 February 2026 (UTC)

Laurits Raun Pedersen (born 25 January 2006) is a Danish professional footballer who plays as a midfielder for Danish Superliga club Randers FC.

== Club career ==
=== Randers ===
Born and raised in Over Hornbæk, a district of Randers, Pedersen started his career in the local club Hornbæk SF before later joining Randers FC. Here he worked his way up through the club's youth academy, all the way to the first team. On his 15th birthday, he also signed his first youth contract.

On April 15, 2023, Randers confirmed that Pedersen was permanently promoted to the first team squad from the 2023–24 season. Just two days later, he made his first appearance on the bench for Randers in a Danish Superliga match against FC Nordsjælland. In the 2023–24 season, Pedersen continued to play primarily for the club's U19 team, while also sitting on the bench in a few first team matches.

Laurits made his official Randers FC debut in a home match against Sønderjyske in the Danish Superliga on August 18, 2024. After six more appearances after his debut, it was confirmed in December 2024 that Pedersen had signed a contract extension until the end of 2027.

== Personal life ==
Laurits Pedersen is the son of former footballer Søren Pedersen, who played over 180 matches for Randers FC and later became assistant coach and director of football at the same club.
