= Mads Freundlich =

Danish footballer (born 2003)

Personal information
- Full name: Mads Lautrup Freundlich
- Date of birth: 25 March 2003 (age 23)
- Place of birth: Aars, Denmark
- Height: 1.77 m (5 ft 10 in)
- Position: Midfielder

Team information
- Current team: Silkeborg
- Number: 33

Youth career
- Aars IK
- –2019: AaB
- 2019–2022: Hobro

Senior career*
Years	Team	Apps	(Gls)
2020–2024	Hobro	61	(5)
2024–	Silkeborg	54	(1)
- * Club domestic league appearances and goals as of 16:12, 15 November 2026 (UTC)

Mads Lautrup Freundlich (born 25 March 2003) is a Danish professional footballer who plays as a midfielder for Danish Superliga club Silkeborg.

== Club career ==
=== Early career ===
Raised in Aars, Freundlich started playing for Aars IK and later for AaB, before joining Hobro IK as an U16 player in 2019.

=== Hobro ===
Freundlich played his way up through the youth ranks and already made his official debut for Hobro's first team in September 2020, in a cup match against IF Lyseng. On 27 May 2021, Freundlich also made his debut in the Danish 1st Division in a match against Hvidovre IF. In the following 2021–22 season Freundlich played just one match for Hobro's first team. Despite this, 18-year-old Freundlich extended his contract in January 2022 until June 2024. In the 2022–23 season Freundlich became a profile for Hobro, and in January 2023 he also signed a new contract until the end of 2026.

=== Silkeborg ===
On 16 July 2024, Danish Superliga club Silkeborg confirmed that they had bought Freundlich, who signed a contract until June 2029. On 21 July, he made his debut against Sønderjyske when he came on the pitch with just under five minutes left. On 10 November, Freundlich scored his first goal for the club in a 1–0 home win against Randers in the Danish Superliga.
