= Aske Andrésen =

Danish footballer (born 2005)

Personal information
- Full name: Aske Leth Andrésen
- Date of birth: 12 July 2005 (age 21)
- Place of birth: Aarhus, Denmark
- Height: 1.94 m (6 ft 4 in)
- Position: Goalkeeper

Team information
- Current team: Silkeborg
- Number: 30

Youth career
- Ry Fodbold
- Silkeborg

Senior career*
Years	Team	Apps	(Gls)
2022–	Silkeborg	18	(0)

International career
2020–2021	Denmark U-16	2	(0)
2021–2022	Denmark U-17	4	(0)
2022–2023	Denmark U-18	6	(0)
2023–2024	Denmark U-19	10	(0)
- * Club domestic league appearances and goals as of 16:05, 15 November 2026 (UTC)

Aske Leth Andrésen (born 12 July 2005) is a Danish professional footballer who plays as a goalkeeper for Danish Superliga club Silkeborg.

== Career ==
=== Silkeborg ===
Andrésen came to Silkeborg from Ry Fodbold as U13 player. He worked his way up through the youth ranks and on 24 October 2021, 16-year old Andrésen was called up for his first professional game; a Danish Superliga game against OB. However, he remained on the bench for the whole game. Andrésen got his official debut on 2 October 2022 against AC Horsens, after first choice goalkeeper, Nicolai Larsen, got injured shortly before the break. 17-year-old Andrésen became the youngest goalkeeper ever in the Danish Superliga history.

On 28 May 2024, he extended his contract with Silkeborg until 30 June 2029.
