= Julius Lorents =

Danish footballer (born 2006)

Personal information
- Full name: Julius Lorents Nielsen
- Date of birth: 26 April 2006 (age 20)
- Place of birth: Silkeborg, Denmark
- Position: Midfielder

Team information
- Current team: Silkeborg
- Number: 36

Youth career
- Resenbro UIF
- Silkeborg

Senior career*
Years	Team	Apps	(Gls)
2024–	Silkeborg	55	(1)

International career
2022	Denmark U16	1	(0)
2022–2023	Denmark U17	9	(1)
2023–2024	Denmark U18	7	(0)
2024–2025	Denmark U19	12	(0)
- * Club domestic league appearances and goals as of 16:13, 15 November 2026 (UTC)

Julius Lorents Nielsen (born 26 April 2006) is a Danish professional footballer who plays as a midfielder for Danish Superliga club Silkeborg.

== Career ==
=== Club career ===
Lorents grew up in Resenbro, a suburb of Silkeborg, and started his football career in the local club Resenbro UIF. At the age of nine, he moved to Silkeborg IF, and in April 2022, sixteen-year-old Nielsen signed a trainee contract with the club.

In February 2024, Lorents joined the first team squad for a training camp in Portugal. In April, he was called up for the first time for the squad for a Danish Superliga match against Nordsjælland, but was an unused substitute. A month later, on 16 May, Lorents signed a new contract until June 2029, where he would become a full-time professional in the summer of 2025 and be promoted to the first team squad.

On 28 July 2024, in the second round of the 2024–25 Danish Superliga, Lorents made his official debut for Silkeborg when he replaced Tonni Adamsen after 69 minutes of play.

On 26 April 2026, he scored his first senior goal for the club in a 2–0 victory over Randers in the 2025–26 Danish Superliga relegation round.
