= Oskar Boesen =

Danish footballer (born 2005)

Personal information
- Full name: Oskar Adam Rudkjøbing Boesen
- Date of birth: 5 May 2005 (age 21)
- Place of birth: Valencia, Spain
- Height: 1.75 m (5 ft 9 in)
- Position: Midfielder

Team information
- Current team: Esbjerg

Youth career
- Valencia
- Hvidovre
- Silkeborg

Senior career*
Years	Team	Apps	(Gls)
2023–2026	Silkeborg	35	(0)
2026	→ Stabæk (loan)	4	(0)
2026–	Esbjerg	0	(0)

International career
2023	Denmark U18	2	(0)
2024	Denmark U19	2	(0)
- * Club domestic league appearances and goals as of 10:44, 2 July 2026 (UTC)

Oskar Adam Rudkjøbing Boesen (born 5 May 2005) is a Danish professional footballer who plays as a midfielder for Danish 1st Division club Esbjerg.

== Club career ==
=== Youth career ===
Oskar Boesen was born to Danish parents, but was born in Spain, where he lived for his first 15 years. During his time in Spain, Boesen played for Valencia. He then went to a boarding school in Brøndby and played for Hvidovre, from where he joined Silkeborg in the summer 2022.

=== Silkeborg ===
In the winter of 2023, 17-year-old Boesen was selected for Silkeborg's training camp squad to go to Spain. In March 2023, 17-year old Boesen signed a 'trainee contract' with Silkeborg.

On 6 April 2023, Boesen got his official debut for Silkeborg in a Danish Cup game against Sønderjyske, where he came on for the last few minutes. About a month later, he also got his Danish Superliga debut in a 0–3 defeat against Midtjylland.

On 14 August 2023, Silkeborg confirmed that Boesen had signed a full-time contract and had been promoted to the first team squad, signing a deal until June 2027. On 1 November 2023, Boesen scored his first goal for Silkeborg in a Danish Cup game against Hvidovre.

On 20 January 2026, Boesen was loaned out to Norwegian First Division club Stabæk until the end of the season.

=== Esbjerg ===
On 29 June 2026, Danish 1st Division side Esbjerg announced the signing of Boesen on a four-year deal.

== Honours ==
Silkeborg

- Danish Cup: 2023–24
