= Christian Gammelgaard =

Danish footballer (born 2003)

Personal information
- Full name: Christian William Gammelgaard Grøndal
- Date of birth: 10 March 2003 (age 23)
- Place of birth: Vejle, Denmark
- Position: Right winger

Team information
- Current team: Vejle
- Number: 7

Youth career
- Vejle

Senior career*
Years	Team	Apps	(Gls)
2021–	Vejle	80	(10)
2024	→ Fredericia (loan)	14	(2)

International career
2022	Denmark U19	2	(1)
- * Club domestic league appearances and goals as of 19 May 2026

Christian William Gammelgaard Grøndal (born 10 March 2003) is a Danish professional footballer who plays as a right winger for Danish Superliga club Vejle Boldklub.

== Career ==
=== Vejle ===
Gammelgaard is a product of the Vejle academy. In March 2021, Gammelgaard signed a new contract with the club until June 2022.

Gammelgaard got his official debut for Vejle on 22 October 2021 in a Danish Superliga game against Nordsjælland, where he came in from the bench to the last couple of minutes. On 26 January 2022 Vejle confirmed, that Gamelgaard had signed a new two-year deal running from the summer 2022, which also secured him a promotion to the first team squad.

In August 2023, Gamelgaard signed a new contract with Vejle until June 2026. After a six-month break due to a foot injury, more precisely, a fatigue fracture, Gammelgaard made his comeback in a reserve team match on 2 October 2023.

In pursuit of more playing time, on 31 January 2024, Gammelgaard was loaned to Danish 1st Division club Fredericia until the end of the season.

== Personal life ==
Gammelgaard is the son of former Danish footballer Niels Ejnar Gammelgaard, who also played for Vejle between 1993 and 1996.

He has a younger brother, Nicolas (b. 2008), who similarly went on to play football in the youth sector of Vejle.

== Honours ==
Vejle

- Danish 1st Division: 2022–23
