= Mads Larsen (footballer) =

Danish footballer (born 2001)

Personal information
- Full name: Mads Larsen
- Date of birth: 20 September 2001 (age 25)
- Place of birth: Esbjerg, Denmark
- Height: 1.83 m (6 ft 0 in)
- Position: Midfielder

Team information
- Current team: Silkeborg
- Number: 20

Youth career
- Tarp BK
- Andrup IF
- Esbjerg fB

Senior career*
Years	Team	Apps	(Gls)
2017–2024	Esbjerg fB	104	(12)
2024–	Silkeborg	93	(1)

International career
2016–2017	Denmark U16	6	(0)
2018	Denmark U17	3	(0)
2018	Denmark U18	4	(0)
- * Club domestic league appearances and goals as of 16:11, 15 November 2026 (UTC)

Mads Larsen (born 20 September 2001) is a Danish professional footballer who plays as a midfielder for Danish Superliga club Silkeborg.

== Career ==
=== Esbjerg ===
Larsen signed his first youth contract on his 15th birthday. Larsen took the step from the U17 squad directly to the first team squad. On 19 November 2017, Larsen got his official debut for Esbjerg fB in the Danish 1st Division, making him the youngest debutant in the history of the club, with his 16 years and two months of age. He came on the pitch from the bench with half an hour left of a game against Brabrand. Larsen played eight league games and scored one goal in the 2017/18 season and helped the team gain promotion to the Danish Superliga. He was permanently promoted to the first team squad for the 2018/19 season.

On 19 August 2018, he made his debut in the Danish Superliga for Esbjerg, making him the youngest debutant in the Superliga in the history of the club in a 1–0 victory against Brøndby IF.

On 24 July 2021, Larsen was appointed new team captain by head coach Peter Hyballa. Four days later, on 28 July, 21 of Esbjerg's first-team players including Larsen sent an open letter to club management, expressing "strong distrust" to Hyballa. The letter, which was also published in several media outlets, mentions several episodes where Hyballa had physically or mentally abused players. As a result, he was benched for the next game against Helsingør on 31 July, with Nicklas Strunck taking over as captain. In the following game on 7 August against Lyngby, Larsen returned as team captain.

=== Silkeborg ===
On 17 January 2024, Larsen signed a four-year contract with Danish Superliga club Silkeborg.

== Honours ==
Silkeborg

- Danish Cup: 2023–24
