= Sebastian Biller =

Danish footballer (born 2006)

Personal information
- Full name: Sebastian Biller Mikkelsen
- Date of birth: 1 November 2006 (age 20)
- Place of birth: Hvinningdal, Silkeborg, Denmark
- Height: 1.70 m (5 ft 7 in)
- Position: Left winger

Team information
- Current team: Hødd (on loan from Silkeborg)
- Number: 19

Youth career
- HA85
- Silkeborg

Senior career*
Years	Team	Apps	(Gls)
2025–	Silkeborg	4	(0)
2026–	→ Hødd (loan)	29	(3)

International career^{‡}
2022	Denmark U16	2	(2)
2022–2023	Denmark U17	11	(6)
2023–2024	Denmark U18	7	(1)
2024–	Denmark U19	5	(1)
- * Club domestic league appearances and goals as of 14 November 2026 ‡ National team caps and goals as of 10:23, 10 August 2025 (UTC)

Sebastian Biller Mikkelsen (born 1 November 2006) is a Danish professional footballer who plays as a left winger for Norwegian First Division club Hødd, on loan from Danish Superliga club Silkeborg.

== Career ==
=== Silkeborg ===
Biller, who grew up in Hvinningdal, a small neighborhood in the western part of the city of Silkeborg, started his football career at local club HA85 before moving to Silkeborg IF at the age of 9. He fought his way up through the club's academy, where he also scored many goals and played numerous matches for various Danish youth national teams along the way.

In the winter of 2024, 17-year-old Biller joined the first team for a training camp in Portugal, and three months later, in May 2024, he signed a long-term agreement with Silkeborg, which would see him transition to a full-time contract from the summer of 2025.

Leading up to his debut, Biller had been on the bench several times. However, he had to wait to get on the pitch until 4 May 2025, when he came on as a substitute for Jeppe Andersen in the final minutes of a Danish Superliga match against Vejle.

On 30 January 2026, Biller was loaned out to Norwegian First Division club Hødd until the end of the year.
