= Melker Jonsson =

Swedish footballer (born 2002)

Personal information
- Full name: Melker Olle Jonsson
- Date of birth: 10 September 2002 (age 24)
- Place of birth: Helsingborg, Sweden
- Height: 1.86 m (6 ft 1 in)
- Position: Centre-back

Team information
- Current team: Silkeborg
- Number: 15

Youth career
- –2019: IFK Lidingö
- 2019–2020: Djurgårdens IF

Senior career*
Years	Team	Apps	(Gls)
2020–2022	Djurgårdens IF	3	(0)
2022	→ Landskrona BoIS (loan)	4	(0)
2022–2026	Landskrona BoIS	82	(2)
2026–	Silkeborg	3	(0)

International career
2019	Sweden U19	2	(0)
- * Club domestic league appearances and goals as of 16:54, 2 October 2026 (UTC)

Melker Olle Jonsson (born 10 July 2002) is a Swedish professional footballer who plays as a centre-back for Danish Superliga club Silkeborg.

== Career ==
On 29 January 2026, Danish Superliga club Silkeborg announced the signing of Jonsson on a one-year contract.

== Personal life ==
Melker is the son of former Sweden striker Mattias Jonson.
