= Silkeborg IF =

Association football club in Denmark

Silkeborg
- Full name: Silkeborg Idrætsforening
- Short name: SIF
- Founded: 1917; 109 years ago
- Ground: JYSK Park
- Capacity: 10,000 (6,000 seated)
- Owner: Trivela Group
- Chairman: Kent Madsen
- Head coach: Morten Dahm Kjærgaard
- League: Superliga
- 2025–26: Superliga, 9th of 12
- Website: www.silkeborgif.com
Home colours	Away colours

Silkeborg Idrætsforening, (pronounced [ˈse̝lkəˌpɒˀ ˈitʁætsfɒˌe̝ˀne̝ŋ]; commonly known as Silkeborg IF or SIF in short) is a professional football club based in Silkeborg, Denmark. The club was founded in 1917, reached the highest level of Danish football in 1987, and afterwards became one of the most successful football clubs in Denmark. They won the 1993–94 Danish Superliga, finished third in 1994–95, 2000–01, and 2021–22, second in 1997–98, and won the Danish Cup in 2001 and 2024. Silkeborg has participated in European competitions several times, winning the UEFA Intertoto Cup in 1996.

== History ==
Founded in 1917, the football section of Silkeborg IF played in the top ranks of Jutland until a short visit in the third division in 1962. In 1966, however the team was promoted to the 2nd division of Danish football. In 1982, the club took the decisive step towards the Danish top football, as the company SIF Football Support A / S was founded, a professional company that would be responsible for professional football in Silkeborg. This resulted in a rise in 1987 to the country's top row, the 1st division. This came as a large surprise to most football enthusiasts and a reporter from the Danish newspaper Politiken wrote, "It will be a surprise if Silkeborg will win a corner kick." The team, however, played well and already in the third game of the season Silkeborg defeated Denmark's dominant team, Brøndby with a 1–0 win at home.

=== 1994 championship ===
There were many vital matches in the 1993–94 season, but perhaps the most important game for Silkeborg was the tournament's third round match at home against Brøndby. Just before the game, the team's big name Jakob Kjeldberg had been sold to Chelsea, and when Brøndby put themselves ahead 2–0 early in the game, it looked difficult for the home team. But Silkeborg totally turned the match upside down and won 4–2 in front of an enthusiastic audience. During the rest of autumn, SIF delivered one attractive game after another. The team lost only 2 of 18 matches and finished the autumn in 1st place.

The playoffs were a thrilling affair. The superior play in the autumn was followed by a more calculating style. Away from home, SIF ran into a few serious defeats, but, in turn, Silkeborg Stadion was a fortress. Here, SIF won six out of seven games and conceded only one goal. In the second-to-last round, SIF could secure the championship with an away win against the only remaining competitor, Copenhagen. Silkeborg fans flocked to the national arena, Parken Stadium, where the match was witnessed by the largest crowd in history of the Danish Superliga, namely 26,679. The many visiting SIF fans, however, witnessed SIF scoring the first goal of the match but eventually losing 4–1.

The situation before the final round was that SIF should provide a better result than Copenhagen to become champions. At home, SIF played AaB and won 2–0, thanks to two goals by leading scorer Heine Fernandez. In Odense, OB obtained a lead over Copenhagen in the 2nd half and won 3–2 on a goal in injury time, securing SIF the championship.

The 11 starters of the final in the 2000–01 Danish Cup

=== 2001 cup winners and relegation ===
In 2001, Silkeborg won the Danish Cup with a 4–1 victory against league rivals AB. Behind 0–1 at half-time, the team scored 4 times in the second half of the match by Brian Pedersen, Thomas Poulsen and 2 from Henrik Pedersen. Steven Lustü, who later would become a prominent player for Silkeborg, played the entire game for AB. The following years' results were not very impressive. After the cup victory, the club sold Henrik Pedersen to Bolton Wanderers, Peter Kjær to Beşiktaş and Thomas Røll to Copenhagen. At the same time, Morten Bruun, the player with most caps to his name in the club history, retired. In 2003, the team was relegated to the 1st Division, but returned to the Superliga the following year. For two consecutive seasons, the team finished eighth in the league with 12 teams, but in 2007 the team was again relegated. When former player Troels Bech returned to the club as head coach in 2009, however, he transformed the team and helped the club to promotion. Silkeborg finished fifth in the league in 2011, their best result in 15 years.

=== 2018–19 1st Division Title ===
In the 2018–19 Danish 1st Division Silkeborg were crowned champions of the First Division for a third time, ensuring a return to the Danish Superliga for the 2019–20 season following a one-year absence.

Danish Striker Ronnie Schwartz was the league's top scorer for Silkeborg with 17 league goals registered; sharing the golden boot with Roskilde's Emil Nielsen.

They secured the league title with 61 points, only 1 point clear of nearest rivals Viborg, ensuring an automatic return to the Superliga.

=== From promotion to Europe ===
As Silkeborg won promotion to the Danish Superliga in 2021, many experts expected the club to continue its status as a yo-yo club and be in a relegation battle, but head coach Kent Nielsen managed to impress this time in the top division. His attacking style of play with focus on possession and short passing game meant that the club qualified for the championship play-offs for the first time in the club's recent history. Especially the attacking trio, Nicolai Vallys, Sebastian Jørgensen and Nicklas Helenius – often referred to as "VHS" – impressed with many goals and assists.

One of the reasons for Silkeborg's success was seen as their ability to hold on to key players during the 2021–22 winter break, despite interest for Tobias Salquist and Rasmus Carstensen. In the play-offs, Silkeborg managed to beat both Copenhagen and Brøndby in historic fashion during the same week. Brøndby were defeated 3–0 and Copenhagen, who had not lost the previous eight games, were beaten 3–1. Ultimately, the season finished in third place and their first bronze medals since 2000–01, as Silkeborg were considered the most "entertaining" and "well-playing" team in the Superliga.

Due to the 2022 Russian invasion of Ukraine, all Russian teams were excluded from European tournaments by UEFA. This meant that the Danish Cup winners entered the final qualifying round for the UEFA Europa League. When Midtjylland won the 2021–22 Danish Cup, and at the same time finished in second place in the Superliga, which now gave access to UEFA Champions League qualification, Silkeborg secured Europa League qualification by virtue of their third-place Superliga finish.

On 9 May 2024, Silkeborg won their second Danish Cup, having previously won it in 2001, with Oliver Sonne scoring the only goal in the final against AGF at Parken Stadium in Copenhagen.

== Honours ==
=== League ===
- Superliga
  - Champions (1): 1993–94
  - Runners-up (1): 1997–98
  - Third (3): 1994–95, 2000–01, 2021–22
- 1st Division
  - Champions (4): 1987, 2003–04, 2013–14, 2018–19

=== Cups ===
- Danish Cup
  - Winners (2): 2000–01, 2023–24
  - Runners-up (2): 2017–18, 2024–25

=== International ===
- Intertoto Cup
  - Winners (1): 1996
- The Atlantic Cup
  - Winners (1): 2024

== Players ==
=== Current squad ===
As of 15 September 2026

Note: Flags indicate national team as defined under FIFA eligibility rules; some limited exceptions apply. Players may hold more than one non-FIFA nationality.

No.	Pos.	Nation	Player
1	GK	DEN	Aske Andrésen
2	DF	DEN	Andreas Poulsen
3	DF	NOR	Robin Østrøm
4	DF	POR	Pedro Ganchas
6	DF	FRA	Maël de Gevigney
7	MF	DEN	Villads Westh
8	MF	DEN	Kristian Kirkegaard
11	FW	DEN	Oliver Ross
14	MF	DEN	Sofus Berger
15	DF	SWE	Melker Jonsson
16	GK	DEN	Bastian Holm
19	DF	DEN	Jens Martin Gammelby
20	MF	DEN	Mads Larsen

No.	Pos.	Nation	Player
21	FW	DEN	Lucas Riisgaard
22	MF	SWE	Rami Al Hajj
23	FW	DEN	Malthe Hansen
24	DF	DEN	Alexander Priesborg Madsen
25	DF	SWE	Pontus Rödin
26	MF	DEN	Mikkel Øxenberg
27	MF	DEN	William Kirk
29	DF	DEN	William Møller
30	GK	DEN	Thomas Mikkelsen
33	MF	DEN	Mads Freundlich
36	MF	DEN	Julius Lorents
40	DF	DEN	Alexander Busch

=== Youth players in use 2026–27 ===
Note: Flags indicate national team as defined under FIFA eligibility rules; some limited exceptions apply. Players may hold more than one non-FIFA nationality.

No.	Pos.	Nation	Player
42	FW	DEN	Kristian Bloch

=== Out on loan ===
Note: Flags indicate national team as defined under FIFA eligibility rules; some limited exceptions apply. Players may hold more than one non-FIFA nationality.

No.	Pos.	Nation	Player
10	FW	DEN	Younes Bakiz (at Raja CA until 30 June 2027)
18	DF	DEN	Leonel Montano (at HJK until 31 December 2026)

No.	Pos.	Nation	Player
35	FW	DEN	Sebastian Biller (at Hødd until 31 December 2026)

== Staff ==
=== Non-playing staff ===
Position	Staff
Manager	(Denmark) Morten Dahm Kjærgaard
Assistant managers	(Denmark) Peder Knudsen (Denmark) Anders Holvad
Goalkeeping coach	(Denmark) Oliver Rosengren
Transition coach	(Denmark) Kim Leth Andersen
Fitness coach	(Denmark) Rasmus Hansen
Physiotherapist	(Denmark) Michael Larsen (Denmark) Rasmus Linneberg
Masseur	(Denmark) Nina Schack
Doctor	(Denmark) Kaspar Saxtrup
Team leader	(Denmark) Flemming Møldrup
Head of scouting	(Denmark) Arun Rajkumar
Sporting director	(Denmark) Jesper Stücker

Last updated: 19 August 2026

=== Managerial history ===
- Viggo Jensen (1987–92)
- Bo Johansson (1992–94)
- Bo Nielsson (1994)
- Frank Petersen (1995)
- Preben Elkjær (1995–96)
- Sepp Piontek (1997–99)
- Benny Johansen (1999–01)
- Morten Bruun (2001–02)
- Viggo Jensen (July 2002–October 2006)
- Peder Knudsen (October 2006–December 2008)
- Preben Lundbye (2007)
- Troels Bech (January 2009–June 2012)
- Keld Bordinggaard (July 2012–November 2012)
- Viggo Jensen (November 2012–June 2013)
- Jesper Sørensen (July 2013–December 2014)
- Kim Poulsen (December 2014–September 2015)
- Peter Sørensen (September 2015–August 2018)
- Michael Hansen (August 2018–May 2019)
- Kent Nielsen (June 2019–June 2026)
- Morten Dahm Kjærgaard (July 2026–present)

== Silkeborg in European competitions ==
Season	Cup	Round	Opponent	Home	Away	Aggregate
1991	Intertoto Cup	Group 4	(Sweden) Hammarby IF	4–1	3–1	2nd
1991	Intertoto Cup	Group 4	(Germany) Energie Cottbus	4–1	1–0	2nd
1991	Intertoto Cup	Group 4	(Czechoslovakia) Dukla Banksá Bystrica	1–3	0–2	2nd
1993	Intertoto Cup	Group 6	(Switzerland) Zürich	N/A	0–2	5th
1993	Intertoto Cup	Group 6	(Germany) VfL Bochum	2–2	N/A	5th
1993	Intertoto Cup	Group 6	(Austria) Tirol	1–1	N/A	5th
1993	Intertoto Cup	Group 6	(Czechoslovakia) Slovan Bratislava	N/A	1–2	5th
1994	Intertoto Cup	Group 1	(Sweden) Halmstads BK	N/A	0–2	5th
1994	Intertoto Cup	Group 1	(Israel) Maccabi Netanya	0–0	N/A	5th
1994	Intertoto Cup	Group 1	(Czech Republic) Sparta Prague	N/A	1–4	5th
1994	Intertoto Cup	Group 1	(Bulgaria) Lokomotiv Sofia	7–2	N/A	5th
1994–95	Champions League	1Q	(Ukraine) Dynamo Kyiv	0–0	1–3	1–3
1995–96	UEFA Cup	1Q	(Northern Ireland) Crusaders	4–0	1–2	5–2
1995–96	UEFA Cup	2Q	(Czech Republic) Sparta Prague	1–2	0–1	1–3
1996	Intertoto Cup	Group 4	(Belgium) Sporting Charleroi	N/A	4–2	1st
1996	Intertoto Cup	Group 4	(Poland) Zagłębie Lubin	0–0	N/A	1st
1996	Intertoto Cup	Group 4	(Austria) SV Ried	N/A	3–0	1st
1996	Intertoto Cup	Group 4	(Wales) Conwy United	3–0	N/A	1st
1996	Intertoto Cup	SF	(Russia) Uralmash	0–1	2–1	2–2 (a)
1996	Intertoto Cup	F	(Croatia) Segesta Sisak	0–1	2–1	2–2 (a)
1996–97	UEFA Cup	Q	(Russia) Spartak Moscow	1–2	2–3	3–5
1997	Intertoto Cup	Group 2	(Austria) Grazer AK	N/A	0–2	3rd
1997	Intertoto Cup	Group 2	(Croatia) Hrvatski Dragovoljac	5–0	N/A	3rd
1997	Intertoto Cup	Group 2	(France) Bastia	N/A	0–1	3rd
1997	Intertoto Cup	Group 2	(Wales) Ebbw Vale	6–1	N/A	3rd
1998–99	UEFA Cup	1Q	(Slovenia) Mura	2–0	0–0	2–0
1998–99	UEFA Cup	R1	(Italy) Roma	0–2	0–1	0–3
2000	Intertoto Cup	R1	(Belarus) Dnepr Mogilev	1–2	1–2	2–4
2001–02	UEFA Cup	1R	(Spain) Real Zaragoza	1–2	0–3	1–5
2022–23	UEFA Europa League	PO	(Finland) HJK	1–1	0–1	1–2
2022–23	UEFA Europa Conference League	Group B	(Belgium) Anderlecht	0–2	0–1	3rd
2022–23	UEFA Europa Conference League	Group B	(England) West Ham United	2–3	0–1	3rd
2022–23	UEFA Europa Conference League	Group B	(Romania) FCSB	5–0	5–0	3rd
2024–25	UEFA Europa League	2Q	(Norway) Molde	3–2	1–3	4–5
2024–25	UEFA Conference League	3Q	(Belgium) Gent	2–2	2–3	4–5
2025–26	UEFA Conference League	2Q	(Iceland) KA	1–1	3–2 (a.e.t.)	4–3
2025–26	UEFA Conference League	3Q	(Poland) Jagiellonia Białystok	0–1	2–2	2–3

== Former notable players ==
=== Top goalscorers ===
Competitive matches only. To matches played 22 March 2017.

#	Name	Career	Goals
1	(Denmark) Henrik Pedersen	1995–2001 and 2008–2012	96
2	(Denmark) Heine Fernandez	1990–1998	96
3	(Denmark) Rajko Lekić	2003–2004 and 2008–2011	76
4	(Faroe Islands) Christian Holst	2008–2014	47
5	(Denmark) Jesper Thygesen	1994–1998 and 2000–2003	45
6	(Denmark) Iddi Alkhag	2001–2007	41
7	(Denmark) Michael Hansen	1991–1996 and 2006–2007	39
8	(Denmark) Morten Bruun	1988–2001	35
9	(Denmark) Ole Skov	1988–1992	35
10	(Denmark) Nocko Joković	1996–1999	33
11	(Denmark) Peter Lassen	1999–2000	33
12	(Denmark) Allan Reese	1991–1997	32
13	(Denmark) Hans Erfurt	1987–1994	31
14	(Germany) Marvin Pourie	2011–2013	29
15	(Denmark) Jesper Bech	2004–2014	28

=== Top appearances ===
Competitive matches only. To matches played 22 March 2017.

#	Name	Career	Appearances
1	(Denmark) Morten Bruun	1988–2001	424
2	(Denmark) Bjarne Jensen		348
3	(Denmark) Dennis Flinta	2005–2007 and 2009–present	329
4	(Denmark) Ingvar Johansen	1979–1993	325
5	(Denmark) Arne Skovbo		308
6	(Denmark) Kurt Nielsen		307
7	(Denmark) Peter Kjær	1993–2001	291
8	(Denmark) Christian Duus	1991–2005	283
9	(Denmark) Henrik Pedersen	1995–2001 and 2008–2012	270
10	(Denmark) Michael Larsen	1992–2003	269
11	(Denmark) Thomas Poulsen	1997–2006	255
12	(Denmark) Brian Skaarup	−1991	254
13	(Denmark) Heine Fernandez	1990–1998	246
14	(Denmark) Jørgen Hansen		245
15	(Denmark) Jesper Thygesen	1994–1998 and 2000–2003	245
