= 2024–25 Danish Cup =

70th season of the Danish Cup

Pokalen (The Cup)
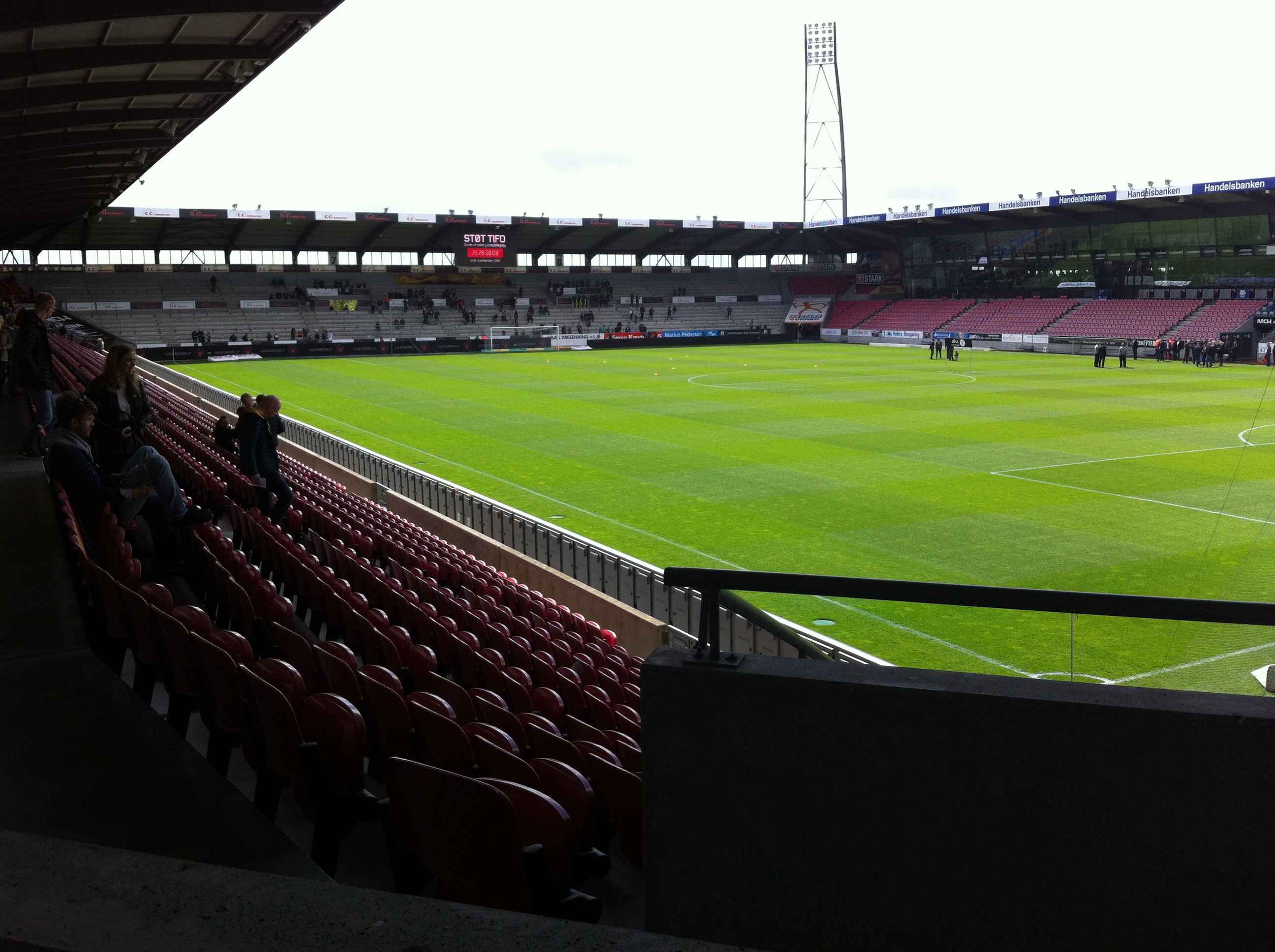
- MCH Arena hosted the final

Tournament details
- Country: Denmark
- Teams: 104

Final positions
- Champions: Copenhagen (10th title)
- Runners-up: Silkeborg

Tournament statistics
- Matches played: 109
- Goals scored: 434 (3.98 per match)
- Attendance: 11,048 (101 per match)
- Top goal scorer: Mathias Jørgensen (6 goals)

The 2024–25 Danish Cup, also known as Oddset Pokalen, was the 71st season of the Danish Cup competition.

The winner of the competition earned a place in the first qualifying round of the 2025–26 UEFA Europa League.

Silkeborg were the defending champions but were defeated by Copenhagen in the final at MCH Arena on 29 May 2025. Copenhagen achieved a record-setting tenth Danish Cup trophy.

== Structure ==
92 teams will participate in the first round, coming from all levels of competition. Six additional teams join in the second round, while the top six teams from the 2023–24 Danish Superliga enter in the third round.

Round	Date	Number of fixtures	Clubs remaining	New entries this round	Teams entering this round
Qualifying matches	Dates TBD		→ 56		Danmarks serien teams and Teams from Tier 6 to 9
First Round	6-8 August 2024	46	92 → 46	36	12 NordicBetLiga teams 12 2nd Division teams 12 3rd Division teams
Second Round	3–5 September 2024	26	52 → 26	6	6 Superliga teams (7-12)
Third Round	24–26 September 2024	16	32 → 16	6	6 Superliga teams (1-6)
Fourth Round	29–31 October 2024	8	16 → 8	None	None
Quarter-Finals	7–8 December/14–15 December 2024	4(8)	8 → 4	None	None
Semi-Finals	30 April–1 May/7–8 May 2025	2(4)	4 → 2	None	None
Final	29 May 2025	1	2 → 1	None	None

== Participants ==
104 teams will compete for the Danish Cup. All teams from the top four divisions in 2024–25 were automatically entered, while 54 teams from lower division teams qualified through qualifying matches to enter the competition proper.

== First round ==
In the first round of the tournament, 92 teams will compete, including 56 clubs from the various levels of the Denmark Series and below, all teams from 2023-24 Danish 3rd Division and 2023-24 Danish 2nd Division, the 3rd-12th placed teams from the 2023-24 Danish 1st Division and the 11th-12th placed teams from the 2023-24 Danish Superliga. Teams are split into three regions:

- Zealand/Bornholm/Falster/Lolland
- Fyn/Southern Jutland
- Middle/Northern Jutland

Number of teams per tier still in competition
3F Superliga (tier 1)	NordicBet Liga (tier 2)	2. Division; (tier 3)	3. Division; (tier 4)	Danmarksserien (tier 5)	Regionalseries (tier 6)	Serie 1 & 2 (tier 7 & 8)	Total
12 / 12	12 / 12	12 / 12	12 / 12	18 / 18	23 / 23	15 / 15	104 / 104

=== Zealand/Bornholm/Falster/Lolland ===
5 August 2024	Karlslunde IF (5)	0–1	B.93 (2)	Karlslunde Stadion
18:00			Nnamani 90+1'

5 August 2024	HIK (3)	0–2	FC Roskilde (2)	Gentofte Sportspark Vest
18:00			Başkaya 65', 72'

6 August 2024	NB Bornholm (6)	3–2	IF Skjold Birkerød (6)	Nexø Stadion
16:45	Olsen 35' (pen.); Chaviv 42'; Olsen 81'		Nejstgaard 84'; Madsen 86'

6 August 2024	Ringsted IF (5)	1–2	Brønshøj (4)	Ringsted Stadion
18:00	Heinz 34'		Bill 44'; Kiilerich 60'

6 August 2024	Svebølle BI 2016 (6)	0–1	Nykøbing FC (3)	Svebølle stadion
18:00			Lohse 42'

6 August 2024	Bagsværd BK (6)	1–6	BK Frem (3)	Bagsværd Stadion
18:00	Williamson 4'		Gernsøe 15', 54', 69'; Callaku 26'; Aliji 32' (pen.); Seeger-Hansen 82'

6 August 2024	Gørslev IF (5)	3–1	Sundby BK (4)	Gørslev Stadion
18:00	Koertz 12'; Larsen 58'; Schousboe 69'		Eriksen 90+1'

6 August 2024	B1960 (6)	0–3	Allerød FK (5)	Grønnemosen
19:00

6 August 2024	FA 2000 (4)	1–5	HB Køge (2)	Jens Jessens vej
18:30			Jensen 53'; Rothmann 63', 77'; Arias 81', 87'

6 August 2024	Kastrup BK (6)	1–2	Hvidovre IF (2)	Kastrup IA ved Røllikevej
18:30	Sommer 43'		Adjei-Broni 9'; Meibom 32'

6 August 2024	FC ESPM (8)	0–5	Fremad Amager (3)	Sundby Idrætspark
19:00			Lauritsen 44'; Petræus 56'; Al-Atlassi 89'; Ørneborg 90+1'; Belmaillah 90+2'

6 August 2024	Vigerslev BK (6)	0–1	Herlev IF (5)	Valby Idrætspark
19:00			Blixt 47'

7 August 2024	LUIF (6)	0-10	Vanløse IF (5)	LUIF's anlæg
18:00			Pedersen 4'; Bodholdt-Larsen 23' (pen.); Lauritzen 36'; Bagger 51'; Sonne 55'; Paludan 63' (pen.), 72', 90'; Brondum 73'; Barlach 87'

7 August 2024	NFB (6)	0-6	Ishøj IF (3)	KL Køleteknik Arena
18:00

7 August 2024	Jyllinge FC (7)	1-10	Holbæk B&I (4)	Spraglehøj idrætsanlæg
18:00

7 August 2024	FC Gladsaxe (6)	0-2	BK Avarta (4)	Skovbrynet Skole
18:00

7 August 2024	Herlufsholm GF (6)	0-4 (a.e.t.)	Hørsholm-Usserød (5)	Seiffert Arena
18:00

7 August 2024	Næstved (3)	0-3	Hillerød (2)	Tintshop Park
18:00

7 August 2024	AB Tårnby (5)	1-3	FC Helsingør (3)	Tårnby Stadion
19:00

8 August 2024	Solrød FC (6)	4-1	FC Nakskov (6)	Solrød Idrætcenter
18:00

13 August 2024	FB (6)	0-4	AB (3)	Jens Jessens Vej
19:00

14 August 2024	Nerashté, Ballerup (7)	0-1	B1908 (5)	Ballerup Idrætspark
17:30

=== Fyn & Southern Jutland ===
6 August 2024	Middelfart G&BK (3)	0–0 (a.e.t.) (7–6 p)	OB (2)	Middelfart Stadion
18:00

6 August 2024	ØB (6)	1–5	Næsby (4)	ØB's anlæg
18:00	Hou 85'		Dauerhöj 34', 54'; Lorentzen 58'; Uhd 75'; Stoustrup 88'

6 August 2024	Skjern GF (8)	0–4	OKS (5)	Skjern Idrætspark
18:00			Stockholm 42'; Nygaard 48'; Lykkeberg 68'; Qvortrup 89'

6 August 2024	Varde (6)	0–6	Kolding IF (2)	Vestjysk Bank Stadion
18:00			Møller 70', 80'; Ngongo 71', 74', 79'; Holmelund 83'

6 August 2024	Fredericia fF (7)	0–8	Esbjerg fB (2)	Madsby Enge
18:00			Andersen 9'; Flaskager 44', 63', 71', 86'; Hansen 52', 73'; Meyer 68'

6 August 2024	Kolding B (7)	1–1 (a.e.t.) (5–3 p)	Dalum IF (6)	Mosevej Sportsplads
18:00	Karabek 30' (pen.)		Schmidt 26'

6 August 2024	Ringkøbing (5)	1–9	FC Fredericia (2)	Green Arena
18:00	Egelund 53'		Bøndergaard 5', 15', 17', 33', 57'; Egelund 40'; Muçolli 72', 78', 86'

6 August 2024	MorudVeflinge (6)	3–2	Tarup-Paarup (5)	Morud Stadion
18:00	Søndergaard 10', 17'; Skov 62'		Dongsted 14'; Plougmand 83'

7 August 2024	Sønderborg Fremad (7)	1-7	B 1913 (5)	Bygma Park
18:00

8 August 2024	FC BiH Odense (8)	1-4	Sædding G&IF (8)	Ejby Skole
18:00

8 August 2024	BBB (6)	1-2	Give Fremad (6)	Billinge Stadion
19:00

13 August 2024	B 1909 (5)	3-1	SfB-Oure FA (5)	3F Gillested Park
18:00

=== Middle & Northern Jutland ===
6 August 2024	Christiansbjerg IF (7)	1–3	Brabrand IF (4)	Christiansbjerg idrætsanlæg
18:00	Johansen 81'		Faester 63'; Juul 78', 84'

6 August 2024	Odder (4)	0–2	VSK Aarhus (4)	Spectrum Odder
18:00			Istrefi 4'; Yderholm 16'

6 August 2024	Ålborg Chang (6)	0–3	Skive IK (3)	Sparkassen Danmark Park
18:00

6 August 2024	LBK/Gistrup (8)	2–3	ACFC (7)	Gistrup Idrætscenter
18:00	Bovbjerg 14'; Christensen 43'		Zaabout 62' (pen.); Hundawi 90'; Osman 90+2'

6 August 2024	Gug B (7)	0–3	Hobro (2)	Skøjt Arena
18:00			Nielsen 7'; Compaoré 9'; Sneftrup 74'

6 August 2024	IF Lyseng (4)	0–1	Vendsyssel (2)	Lyseng idrætsanlæg
18:00			Olsen 90+1'

7 August 2024	Lemming IF (7)	1-10	Holstebro BK (4)	Lemming Stadion
18:00

7 August 2024	Ålborg Freja (6)	1-4	Vejgaard BK (5)	Steka bolig park
18:00

7 August 2024	Kjellerup (5)	0-5	AC Horsens (2)	Bjergets idrætsanlæg
18:00

7 August 2024	Nørresundby FB (5)	1-4	Young Boys FD (4)	Nordjyske Bank Arena
18:15

7 August 2024	Vatanspor (7)	0-2	Aarhus Fremad (3)	Sødalskolen
18:15

13 August 2024	ASA (6)	1–2	Thisted FC (3)	Koncenton Park
18:00

== Second round ==
The draw was made on 9 August 2024. Theres was 52 teams:

- 46 teams from the 1st round

New entries:

- 4 teams from the 2023–24 Danish Superliga (7th–10th placed)
- 2 teams from the 2023–24 Danish 1st Division (1st and 2nd placed)

Number of teams per tier still in competition
3F Superliga (tier 1)	NordicBet Liga (tier 2)	2. Division; (tier 3)	3. Division; (tier 4)	Danmarksserien (tier 5)	Regional-series (tier 6)	Serie 1 & 2 (tier 7 & 8)	Total
6 / 6 6 / 6	11 / 12	10 / 12	8 / 12	10 / 18	4 / 23	3 / 15	58 / 104

=== East ===
3 September 2024	NB Bornholm (6)	0–3	FC Helsingør (3)	Nexø Stadium
16:30			Dhaflaoui 65'; Stukonis 81' (o.g.); Drost 86'

3 September 2024	Gørslev IF (5)	1–2 (a.e.t.)	Hvidovre IF (2)	Gørslev Stadium
17:00	Skærlund 71'		Olsen 87'; Aby 120'

3 September 2024	OKS (5)	1–3	Hillerød (2)	OKSON Park
17:00	Sörensen 45'		Bagou 23'; Karlsen 28'; Almosawe 34'

3 September 2024	Brønshøj (4)	1–1 (a.e.t.) (5–4 p)	Vejle (1)	Tingbjerg Idrætspark
18:30	Öcal 2'		Emmanouilidis 64'
	Penalties
	Holden (penalty scored); Larsen (penalty missed); Chang-Andersen (penalty scored); Porsgruun (penalty scored); Teglers (penalty scored); Lynge (penalty scored)		(penalty scored) Emmanouilidis; (penalty missed) Elvius; (penalty scored) Lauritsen; (penalty scored) Čolina; (penalty scored) Yeboah; (penalty missed) Flø

3 September 2024	Vanløse IF (5)	1–2 (a.e.t.)	FC Roskilde (2)	Vanløse Idrætspark
18:30	Paludan 9'		Fæster 45', 93'

3 September 2024	Hørsholm-Usserød (5)	1–2	BK Avarta (4)	Hørsholm Stadium
18:30	Jensen 74' (pen.)		Balck 13'; Eslund 60'

3 September 2024	BK Frem (3)	4–1	Lyngby (1)	Valby Idrætspark
19:00	Aliji 31', 50'; Drammeh 65', 67'		Amon 24'

3 September 2024	Herlev IF (5)	1–4	Ishøj IF (3)	Herlev Stadium
19:00	Damgaard 7'		Moussa 9'; Maretti 32'; El Idrissi 52'; Azaquoun 56'

4 September 2024	Solrød FC (6)	0–7	Sønderjyske (1)	Solrød Idrætspark
17:00			Dal Hende 36'; Haidara 44'; Gallegos 53'; Hyseni 59'; Lyng 66'; Djantou 81' (pen.); Rrahmani 83'

4 September 2024	Allerød FK (5)	0–2	HB Køge (2)	Allerød Idrætpark
17:00			Arias 22' (pen.); Larsen 53'

10 September 2024	Nykøbing FC (3)	2–2 (a.e.t.) (4–5 p)	Fremad Amager (3)	Lollands Bank Park
19:00

10 September 2024	Holbæk B&I (4)	2–0	AB (3)	Holbæk Sportsby
19:00

11 September 2024	B1908 (5)	1–4	B.93 (2)	Sundby Idrætspark
19:00

=== West ===
3 September 2024	Sædding G&IF (8)	1–4	Kolding IF (2)	Guldager Idrætscenter
17:00

3 September 2024	Give Fremad (6)	0–5	Skive IK (3)	Give Stadium
17:00			Kudsk 12', 18'; Jensen 60'; Dieudonne 74'; Huldahl 81'

3 September 2024	Young Boys FD (4)	1–3	Holstebro BK (4)	Søholt Idrædtspark
17:00	Nybro 45+3'		Damtoft 7'; Kildsgaard 29'; Poulsen 36'

3 September 2024	Kolding B (7)	1–2	Vendsyssel (2)	Mosevej Sportsplads
18:30	Jessen 35'		Steffensen 38'; Borgelin 45'

3 September 2024	VSK Aarhus (4)	2–1	Aarhus Fremad (3)	Vejlby(Aarhus)
18:30	Nemec 35'; Eskildsen 57'		Torp 65'

4 September 2024	B 1913 (5)	0–10	Randers (1)	Campus Road
17:00			Odey 3', 10', 43'; Danho 17', 23', 45+3'; Touré 49'; Sulemana 56'; Rømer 78'; Andersen 81'

4 September 2024	Vejgaard BK (5)	1–3	Esbjerg fB (2)	Spar Nord Arena
17:00	Axelsson 23'		Bjur 69'; Meyer 72'; Strunck 77'

4 September 2024	B 1909 (5)	0–4	FC Fredericia (2)	3F Gillested Park
17:00			Egelund 4', 9', 84'; Buch 22'

4 September 2024	MorudVeflinge (6)	0–7	AaB (1)	Morud VVS-EL Stadium
18:15			Helenius 4', 35' (pen.); Kramer 24'; Adedeji 50'; Bomholt 54'; Iredale 61'; Jørgensen 82'

4 September 2024	AC Horsens (2)	0–4	Viborg (1)	Nordstern Arena
19:00			Radić 22'; Renato Júnior 41'; Westergaard 78'; Serginho 89'

10 September 2024	ACFC (7)	1–10	Næsby (4)	Arena Vest (Aarhus)
17:00

10 September 2024	Middelfart G&BK (3)	3–2	Hobro (2)	Middelfart Stadium
17:00

10 September 2024	Brabrand IF (4)	3–0	Thisted FC (3)	Brabrand Idrætsanlæg
17:00

== Third round ==
There was 32 teams:

- 26 teams from the 2nd round

New entries:

- 6 teams from the 2023–24 Danish Superliga (1st–6th placed)

Number of teams per tier still in competition
3F Superliga (tier 1)	NordicBet Liga (tier 2)	2. Division; (tier 3)	3. Division; (tier 4)	Denmark series (tier 5)	Regional-series (tier 6)	Serie 1 & 2 (tier 7 & 8)	Total
4 / 6 6 / 6	9 / 12	6 / 12	7 / 12	0 / 18	0 / 23	0 / 15	32 / 104

17 September 2024	Hillerød (2)	1–4	FC Midtjylland (1)	MCH Arena
17:00	Justinussen 61'	Report	Kuchta 18'; Şimşir 31'; Djú 89'; Chilufya 90+4'	Attendance: 3,500; Referee: Aydin Uslu

19 September 2024	FC Fredericia (2)	0–4	AaB (1)	Monjasa Park
18:00

24 September 2024	Næsby (4)	2–1	B.93 (2)	ALPI Arena
16:00	Stoustrup 48'; Nielsen 90+2'		Mouritz 90+7' (pen.)

24 September 2024	Skive IK (3)	5–0	FC Helsingør (3)	Hancock Arena
17:00	Trương Quốc Minh 48'; Sloth 52'; Huldahl 70', 81'; Østergaard 77'

24 September 2024	Brønshøj (4)	0–3	BK Frem (3)	Tingbjerg Idrætspark
19:00			Gernsoe 17'; Drammeh 45+2' (pen.); Bey 59'

25 September 2024	Brabrand IF (4)	1–0	Randers FC (1)	Brabrandt's Idrætsanlæg
16:00

25 September 2024	Ishøj IF (3)	2–3	SønderjyskE (1)	Ishøj Idrætscenter
16:00

25 September 2024	Middelfart G&BK (3)	2–2 (a.e.t.) (4–6 p)	Viborg FF (1)	Middelfart Stadion
16:00

25 September 2024	VSK Aarhus (4)	0–2	AGF (1)	Ceres Park
17:00

25 September 2024	FC Roskilde (2)	1–3	Silkeborg IF (1)	Roskilde Idrætspark
18:30

25 September 2024	Holbæk B&I (4)	2–1	Holstebro BK (4)	Holbæk Sportsby
18:30

25 September 2024	Fremad Amager (3)	0–5	FC Nordsjælland (1)	Sundby Idrætspark
19:00

25 September 2024	Vendsyssel FF (2)	0–5	Brøndby IF (1)	Nord Energi Arena
19:30

26 September 2024	BK Avarta (4)	2–3	Esbjerg fB (2)	Tømrermester Jim Jensens Park
16:00	Blank 20'; Vinterberg 85'		Lausen 11'; Ladefoged 37', 45'

26 September 2024	HB Køge (2)	0–2	FC København (1)	Herfølge Stadium
19:00			Lerager 81'; Hatzidiakos 90+3'	Attendance: 6,641; Referee: Jacob Karlsen

2 October 2024	Hvidovre IF (2)	1–2	Kolding IF (2)	Pro Ventilation Arena
16:00

== Fourth round ==
The draw was made on 26 September 2024, There will be 16 teams.

Number of teams per tier still in competition
3F Superliga (tier 1)	NordicBet Liga (tier 2)	2. Division; (tier 3)	3. Division; (tier 4)	Denmark series (tier 5)	Regional-series (tier 6)	Serie 1 & 2 (tier 7 & 8)	Total
9 / 12	2 / 12	2 / 12	3 / 12	0 / 18	0 / 23	0 / 15	16 / 104

23 October 2024	Brabrand IF (4)	1−1 (a.e.t.) (10−9 p)	FC Nordsjælland (1)	Brabrandt's Idrætsanlæg
15:00	Frandsen 68'	Report	Nene 8'	Referee: Lasse Graagaard

29 October 2024	BK Frem (3)	0−2	Kolding IF (2)	Valby Idrætspark
18:00			Christian Enemark 50'; Sterling Yatéké 69'

29 October 2024	Holbæk B&I (4)	0−6	Silkeborg IF (1)	JYSK Park
20:00			Bakiz 18'; McCowatt 35'; Mattsson 48'; M. Larsen 54'; Gammelby 57', 77'

30 October 2024	Esbjerg fB (2)	0–2	AaB (1)	Blue Water Arena
17:00			Jørgensen 24', 73'

30 October 2024	SønderjyskE (1)	1–2	FC København (1)	Sydbank Park
20:00	Vinderslev 18'		Soulas 68' (o.g.); Claesson 90+2'

31 October 2024	Næsby (4)	1–4	Viborg FF (1)	ALPI Arena
17:00	Dauerhöj 90+2'		Nouck 19'; Grønning 41'; Kirkegaard 43'; Renato Júnior 88'

31 October 2024	Brøndby IF (1)	1–0	FC Midtjylland (1)	Brøndby Stadium
20:00	Rajović 18'

7 November 2024	Skive IK (3)	2–3 (a.e.t.)	AGF (1)	Hancock Arena
18:30	Vesterholm 21'; Huldahl 88' (pen.)		Badji 52'; Madsen 90+5'; Links 104'

== Quarter-finals ==
There will be 8 teams from the 4th round (winners) playing two legs:

Number of teams per tier still in competition
3F Superliga (tier 1)	NordicBet Liga (tier 2)	2. Division; (tier 3)	3. Division; (tier 4)	Denmark series (tier 5)	Regional series (tier 6)	1 & 2 series (tier 7 & 8)	Total
6 / 12	1 / 12	0 / 12	1 / 12	0 / 18	0 / 23	0 / 15	8 / 104

7 December 2024	Kolding (2)	1–3	Copenhagen (1)	Kolding
14:00 CET	Beck 79'	Report	Delaney 9'; Clem 38'; Chiakha 76'	Stadium: Autocentral Park; Referee: Jakob Kehlet

15 December 2024	Copenhagen (1)	1–0 (4–1 agg.)	Kolding (2)	Copenhagen
14:00 CET	Robert 51'	Report		Stadium: Parken; Referee: Michael Tykgaard

8 December 2024	Brabrand (4)	1–1	Viborg (1)	Brabrand
13:00 CET	Berwald 31'	Report	Nouck Horneman 39'	Stadium: Brabrand Stadion; Referee: Aydin Uslu

13 December 2024	Viborg (1)	6–0 (7–1 agg.)	Brabrand (4)	Viborg
19:00 CET	Westergaard 25'; Bürgy 30'; Jensen 50'; Damkjer 57'; Berger 68'; Ementa 86'	Report		Stadium: Energi Viborg Arena; Referee: Jacob Karlsen

8 December 2025	AGF (1)	1–0	Brøndby (1)	Aarhus
18:30 CET	Links 74'	Report		Stadium: Ceres Park; Referee: Mads-Kristoffer Kristoffersen

15 December 2024	Brøndby (1)	4–2 (4–3 agg.)	AGF (1)	Brøndby
19:00 CET	Wass 11' (pen.); Kvistgaarden 30'; Vallys 57'; Nartey 77'	Report	Mortensen 80'; Duelund 85'	Stadium: Brøndby Stadium; Referee: Jakob Alexander Sundberg

8 December 2024	Silkeborg IF (1)	2–2	AaB (1)	Silkeborg
15:30 CET	Simmelhack 81'; Sonne 83'	Report	Jørgensen 62'; Kramer 90+2'	Stadium: JYSK Park; Referee: Jens Grabski Maae

16 December 2024	AaB (1)	1–2 (3–4 agg.)	Silkeborg IF (1)	Aalborg
19:00 CET	Jørgensen 1'	Report	Bakiz 38' (pen.); Bakiz 58'	Stadium: Aalborg Portland Park

== Semi-finals ==
There are 4 teams from the Quarter-finals playing two legs. Draw for the semi-finals was held on 16 December 2024.

Number of teams per tier still in competition
3F Superliga (tier 1)	NordicBet Liga (tier 2)	2. Division; (tier 3)	3. Division; (tier 4)	Denmark series (tier 5)	Regional series (tier 6)	1 & 2 series (tier 7 & 8)	Total
4 / 12	0 / 12	0 / 12	0 / 12	0 / 18	0 / 23	0 / 15	4 / 104

1 May 2025	Viborg	0–1	Copenhagen	Viborg
19:30		Report	Larsson 58'	Stadium: Energi Viborg Arena; Attendance: 8,513; Referee: Sandi Putros

8 May 2025	Copenhagen	1–0 (2–0 agg.)	Viborg	Copenhagen
19:00	Lerager 32'	Report		Stadium: Parken; Attendance: 26,441; Referee: Morten Krogh

30 April 2025	Brøndby	3–3	Silkeborg IF	Brøndby
18:30	Divković 57'; Kvistgaarden 81', 83'	Report	Poulsen 8'; Vanlerberghe 34' (o.g.); Adamsen 45+1'	Stadium: Brøndby Stadium; Referee: Mikkel Redder

7 May 2025	Silkeborg IF	2–1 (5–4 agg.)	Brøndby	Silkeborg
18:30	McCowatt 16'; Gammelby 66'	Report	Rajovic 47'	Stadium: JYSK Park; Referee: Jakob Kehlet

== Final ==
The winner will qualify for the second qualifying round of 2025–26 Europa League. The match was planned to be played at Brøndby Stadium, but will be played on MCH Arena instead.

29 May 2025	Silkeborg	0−3	Copenhagen	Herning
17:00			Larsson 3'; Lerager 34'; Elyounoussi 38'	Stadium: MCH Arena; Attendance: 11,048; Referee: Jacob Karlsen
