= List of Danish football transfers summer 2022 =

This is a list of Danish football transfers for the 2022 winter transfer window. Only transfers featuring Danish Superliga are listed.

== Danish Superliga ==
Note: Flags indicate national team as has been defined under FIFA eligibility rules. Players may hold more than one non-FIFA nationality.

=== Copenhagen ===
In:

No.	Pos.	Nation	Player
3	DF	SVK	Denis Vavro (from (Italy) Lazio, previously on loan)
12	MF	DEN	Lukas Lerager (from (Italy) Genoa, previously on loan)

Out:

No.	Pos.	Nation	Player
—	DF	DEN	Andreas Bjelland (to Lyngby, previously on loan)
—	DF	GRE	Marios Oikonomou (End of Contract)
6	MF	DEN	Jens Stage (to (Germany) Werder Bremen)
18	MF	ISL	Andri Baldursson (loan return to (Italy) Bologna)
—	FW	DEN	Mikkel Kaufmann (on loan to (Germany) Karlsruher SC, previously on loan at (Germany) Hamburger SV)

=== Midtjylland ===
In:

No.	Pos.	Nation	Player
4	DF	DEN	Stefan Gartenmann (from SønderjyskE)
19	MF	CIV	Chris Kouakou (from (Tunisia) Sfaxien)

Out:

No.	Pos.	Nation	Player
8	MF	GER	Max Meyer (loan return to (Turkey) Fenerbahçe)
36	FW	DEN	Anders Dreyer (loan return to (Russia) Rubin Kazan)
54	MF	DEN	Oscar Fraulo (to (Germany) Borussia Mönchengladbach)
90	GK	DEN	Valdemar Birksø (on loan to Fredericia)
—	DF	DEN	Tobias Anker (to Vendsyssel, previously on loan at Fredericia)
—	MF	DEN	Victor Torp (to (Norway) Sarpsborg 08, previously on loan at (Belgium) Kortrijk)
—	MF	DEN	Christian Tue Jensen (to (Finland) KuPS, previously on loan at Fredericia)
—	FW	AUS	Awer Mabil (to (Spain) Cádiz, previously on loan at (Turkey) Kasımpaşa)

=== Silkeborg ===
In:

No.	Pos.	Nation	Player
25	DF	DEN	Lukas Klitten (on loan from (Italy) Frosinone)
29	MF	DEN	Lukas Engel (from Vejle, previously on loan)

Out:

No.	Pos.	Nation	Player
16	GK	NED	Stan van Bladeren (to Helsingør)
23	FW	DEN	Nicklas Røjkjær (to Fredericia)

=== Brøndby ===
In:

No.	Pos.	Nation	Player
24	FW	CRO	Marko Divković (from (Slovakia) Dunajská Streda, previously on loan)

Out:

No.	Pos.	Nation	Player
21	DF	SWE	Rasmus Wikström (on loan to SønderjyskE)
—	FW	CRO	Ante Erceg (to (Hungary) Debrecen, previously on loan at (Croatia) Osijek)

=== AaB ===
In:

No.	Pos.	Nation	Player
1	GK	CRO	Josip Posavec (from (Croatia) Hajduk Split)
7	FW	BRA	Allan Sousa (from Vejle)
21	DF	NED	Lars Kramer (from Viborg)
25	DF	DEN	Andreas Poulsen (from (Germany) Borussia Mönchengladbach, previously on loan at (Germany) FC Ingolstadt 04)
32	DF	GER	Kilian Ludewig (on loan from (Austria) Salzburg, previously on loan at (Netherlands) Willem II)

Out:

No.	Pos.	Nation	Player
1	GK	SWE	Jacob Rinne (to (Saudi Arabia) Al-Fateh)
26	DF	DEN	Rasmus Thelander (to (Hungary) Ferencváros)
—	GK	DEN	Andreas Hansen (to Nordsjælland, previously on loan)

=== Randers ===
In:

No.	Pos.	Nation	Player
8	DF	SWE	Adam Andersson (on loan from (Norway) Rosenborg)
11	FW	ARM	Edgar Babayan (from Vejle)
90	FW	NGR	Stephen Odey (from (Belgium) Genk, previously on loan)

Out:

No.	Pos.	Nation	Player
8	DF	AUT	Simon Piesinger (to (Austria) Wolfsberg)
20	MF	DEN	Vito Hammershøy-Mistrati (to (Romania) Cluj)
—	MF	NGR	Vincent Onovo (to (Hungary) Újpest, previously on loan)

=== Viborg ===
In:

No.	Pos.	Nation	Player
4	DF	SUI	Nicolas Bürgy (from (Switzerland) Young Boys, previously on loan)

Out:

No.	Pos.	Nation	Player
4	DF	RSA	Lorenzo Gordinho (to HB Køge)
5	DF	IRQ	Frans Putros (to (Thailand) Port)
6	DF	NED	Lars Kramer (to AaB)
33	MF	DEN	Frederik Christensen (to Fredericia)

=== OB ===
In:

No.	Pos.	Nation	Player
14	DF	DEN	Gustav Grubbe (from (Germany) RB Leipzig)
—	FW	GUI	Mohamed Kanté (on loan from (Guinea) Hafia)

Out:

No.	Pos.	Nation	Player
17	DF	THA	Jonathan Khemdee (on loan to Næstved)
18	DF	DEN	Mathias Brems (to Helsingør)
21	MF	DEN	Tarik Ibrahimagic (to Næstved)
26	FW	DEN	Mikkel Hyllegaard (to SønderjyskE)
28	DF	DEN	Christian Vestergaard (on loan to Kolding)
—	MF	UGA	Moses Opondo (to Horsens, previously on loan)

=== Nordsjælland ===
In:

No.	Pos.	Nation	Player
13	GK	DEN	Andreas Hansen (from AaB, previously on loan)

Out:

No.	Pos.	Nation	Player
1	GK	GER	Dudu (loan return to (Germany) Werder Bremen)
3	DF	GHA	Maxwell Woledzi (to (Portugal) Vitória de Guimarães)
8	MF	DEN	Magnus Kofod Andersen (to (Italy) Venezia)
17	FW	CIV	Simon Adingra (to (England) Brighton & Hove Albion)
20	FW	DEN	Andreas Bredahl (to Vejle)
45	MF	DEN	Tochi Chukwuani (to (Italy) Hellas Verona)
—	FW	DEN	Emeka Nnamani (to Nykøbing, previously on loan)
—	FW	DEN	Joachim Rothmann (to HB Køge, previously on loan)

=== AGF ===
In:

No.	Pos.	Nation	Player
4	DF	GER	Yann Aurel Bisseck (from (Germany) 1. FC Köln, previously on loan)
7	MF	DEN	Mads Emil Madsen (from (Czech Republic) Slavia Prague)
14	DF	DEN	Tobias Mølgaard (from Vejle)
—	MF	SWE	Marco Olsson Valdés (from (Sweden) Brommapojkarna)

Out:

No.	Pos.	Nation	Player
7	FW	SLE	Mustapha Bundu (loan return to (Belgium) Anderlecht)
17	MF	ISL	Jón Dagur Þorsteinsson (to (Belgium) OH Leuven)
25	FW	DEN	Eskild Dall (loan return to (Netherlands) Jong Ajax)

=== Horsens ===
In:

No.	Pos.	Nation	Player
6	MF	UGA	Moses Opondo (from OB, previously on loan)
26	FW	NGR	Samson Iyede (from Fredericia)

Out:

No.	Pos.	Nation	Player

=== Lyngby ===
In:

No.	Pos.	Nation	Player
2	DF	DEN	Mikkel Juhl (from Nykøbing)
6	DF	DEN	Andreas Bjelland (from Copenhagen, previously on loan)
9	FW	DEN	Mathias Kristensen (from Nykøbing)

Out:

No.	Pos.	Nation	Player
1	GK	ISL	Frederik Schram (to (Iceland) Valur)
9	DF	DEN	Lasse Fosgaard (to Avarta)
16	FW	DEN	Christian Jakobsen (to Hvidovre)

== See also ==
- 2022–23 Danish Superliga
