= 2020–21 FC Nordsjælland season =

Nordsjælland
2020–21 season
- Chairman: Tom Vernon
- Head coach: Flemming Pedersen
- Stadium: Right to Dream Park
- Danish Superliga: 5th
- Danish Cup: Third round
- Top goalscorer: League: Kamaldeen Sulemana (10 goals); All: Kamaldeen Sulemana (10 goals)
Home colours	Away colours	Third colours

The 2020–21 season was Nordsjælland's 24th season in existence as a football club, 17th under the current name, and 19th consecutive season in the Superliga, the top-flight of football in the country. In addition to the domestic league, the club also competed in this season's edition of the Danish Cup, losing out in the third round to second division side Hvidovre.

== Players ==
As of 1 January 2021

Note: Flags indicate national team as defined under FIFA eligibility rules; some limited exceptions apply. Players may hold more than one non-FIFA nationality.

No.	Pos.	Nation	Player
1	GK	DEN	Peter Vindahl Jensen
2	DF	DEN	Mads Døhr Thychosen
3	DF	NOR	Ulrik Yttergård Jenssen
4	DF	DEN	Kian Hansen
6	MF	DEN	Jacob Steen Christensen
8	MF	DEN	Magnus Kofod Andersen
10	FW	GHA	Kamaldeen Sulemana
12	FW	GHA	Isaac Atanga
14	MF	CIV	Mohammed Diomande
17	FW	CIV	Simon Adingra
19	FW	DEN	Oliver Tølbøll Rimmen
20	FW	DEN	Andreas Bredahl
21	FW	DEN	Emeka Nnamani
22	MF	DEN	Victor Jensen (on loan from Ajax)

No.	Pos.	Nation	Player
23	DF	DEN	Oliver Villadsen
24	FW	USA	Jonathan Amon
25	DF	SVK	Ivan Mesík
28	DF	SUI	Johan Djourou
29	FW	DEN	Joachim Rothmann
30	GK	SVK	Martin Vantruba (on loan from Slavia Prague)
31	GK	DEN	Andreas Gülstorff
32	MF	NOR	Andreas Schjelderup
34	FW	DEN	Martin Frese
36	DF	GHA	Maxwell Woledzi
37	FW	GHA	Ibrahim Sadiq
41	MF	GHA	Abu Francis
42	MF	FIN	Oliver Antman
45	MF	DEN	Tochi Chukwuani

== Transfers ==
=== In ===
No.	Pos	Player	Transferred from	Fee	Date	Source
32	MF	(Norway) Andreas Schjelderup	(Norway) Bodø/Glimt	Free	8 July 2020	
30	GK	(Slovakia) Martin Vantruba	(Czech Republic) Slavia Prague	Loan	18 August 2020	
28	DF	(Switzerland) Johan Djourou	(Switzerland) Neuchâtel Xamax	Free	5 October 2020	
22	MF	(Denmark) Victor Jensen	(Netherlands) Ajax	Loan	1 February 2021	

=== Out ===
No.	Pos	Player	Transferred to	Fee	Date	Source
7	MF	(Denmark) Mikkel Rygaard	(Poland) ŁKS Łódź	Undisclosed	25 December 2020	
12	FW	(Ghana) Isaac Atanga	(United States) FC Cincinnati	Undisclosed	31 March 2021	

== Non-competitive friendlies ==
Win Draw Loss Fixtures

== Competitions ==
=== Overview ===
Competition	First match	Last match	Starting round	Final position	Record							
Competition	First match	Last match	Starting round	Final position	Pld	W	D	L	GF	GA	GD	Win %
Superliga	13 September 2020	10 May 2021	Matchday 1	5th	29	10	10	9	48	45	+3	34.48
Danish Cup	8 October 2020	12 November 2020	Second round	Third round	2	1	0	1	5	3	+2	50.00
Total					31	11	10	10	53	48	+5	35.48

Last updated: 10 May 2021
Source: Weltfussball

=== Danish Superliga ===
==== Results by matchday ====
Matchday	1	2	3	4	5	6	7	8	9	10	11	12	13	14	15	16	17	18	19	20	21	22
Ground	A	A	H	A	H	A	H	H	A	H	A	H	A	H	H	A	A	H	A	H	A	H
Result	L	D	W	L	W	D	W	D	D	W	L	L	L	L	L	D	D	D	W	D	W	W
Position	9	9	5	7	7	6	6	7	7	4	5	8	8	8	10	10	10	10	8	10	8	6

Updated to match(es) played on 21 March 2021. Source: Weltfussball
A = Away; H = Home; W = Win; D = Draw; L = Loss

==== Regular season ====
Pos	Team	Pld	W	D	L	GF	GA	GD	Pts	Qualification
4	Copenhagen	22	10	5	7	39	35	+4	35	Qualification for the Championship round
5	Randers	22	9	5	8	31	21	+10	32	Qualification for the Championship round
6	Nordsjælland	22	7	8	7	35	30	+5	29	Qualification for the Championship round
7	SønderjyskE	22	8	4	10	30	32	−2	28	Qualification for the Relegation round
8	OB	22	7	7	8	25	28	−3	28	Qualification for the Relegation round

Source: Danish Football Association (in Danish), Soccerway
Rules for classification: 1) Points; 2) Goal difference; 3) Goals scored; 4) Away goals scored; 5) Play-off (played on neutral ground if determining teams for different rounds); 6) Draw.

==== Championship round ====
Pos	Team	Pld	W	D	L	GF	GA	GD	Pts	Qualification	BRO	MID	COP	AGF	NOR	RAN
2	Midtjylland	32	18	6	8	57	33	+24	60	Qualification for the Champions League second qualifying round	1–0	—	4–1	4–0	3–0	1–1
3	Copenhagen	32	16	7	9	61	53	+8	55	Qualification for the Europa Conference League second qualifying round	2–1	4–2	—	3–2	2–2	2–1
4	AGF (O)	32	13	9	10	48	42	+6	48	Qualification for the European play-off match	1–2	1–4	1–2	—	3–1	2–0
5	Nordsjælland	32	11	10	11	51	51	0	43		0–3	3–2	2–2	2–0	—	2–1
6	Randers	32	11	7	14	43	38	+5	40	Qualification for the Europa League play-off round (Note: Randers qualified for the Europa League play-off round by winning the 2020–21 Danish Cup.)	4–2	0–0	2–1	0–1	3–4	—

Source: Danish Football Association (in Danish), Soccerway
Legend: Blue = home team win; Yellow = draw; Red = away team win.
Rules for classification: 1) Points; 2) Goal difference; 3) Goals scored; 4) Away goals scored; 5) Play-off (played on neutral ground if determining teams for different rounds); 6) Draw.
(O) Play-off winners

==== Matches ====
===== Regular season =====
13 September 2020 1	Brøndby	3–2	Nordsjælland	Brøndbyvester
16:00 CEST	Hedlund 47'; Vigen 75'; Rosted (yellow card) 77' (goal) 90+6'	Report	Diomande 12' (yellow card) 63'; Rygaard 38'; Hansen (yellow card) 60'	Stadium: Brøndby Stadium; Referee: Jens Maae

20 September 2020 2	OB	1–1	Nordsjælland	Odense
14:00 CEST	O. Lund (yellow card) 33'; Frøkjær-Jensen (yellow card) 41'; Sabbi 57'	Report	Atanga 55'; Frese (yellow card) 72'; Jenssen (yellow card) 90+3'; Thychosen (yellow card) 90+5'; Chukwuani (yellow card) 90+9'	Stadium: Nature Energy Park; Attendance: 300; Referee: Jonas Hansen

28 September 2020 3	Nordsjælland	4–1	Lygby	Farum
19:00 CEST	Jenssen 50'; Sulemana 54', 80'; Andersen 76'; Diomande (yellow card) 79'	Report	Jørgensen 40'; Gregor (yellow card) 56'	Stadium: Right to Dream Park; Attendance: 300; Referee: Peter Kjaersgaard-Andersen

4 October 2020 4	Copenhagen	3–2	Nordsjælland	Copenhagen
20:00 CEST	Boilsen 6'; Wind 30' 60' (pen.); Zeca (yellow card) 77'; Oviedo (yellow card) 90+6'	Report	Diomande 17'; Frese 48' (Thycosen); Rygaard (yellow card) 75'	Stadium: Telia Parken; Attendance: 220; Referee: Morten Krogh

19 October 2020 5	Nordsjælland	1–0	Randers	Farum
19:00 CEST	Jenssen 36'; Rygaard (yellow card) 68'; Diomande (yellow card) 73'; Hansen (yellow card) 80'; Amon 85'	Report	Kallesøe (yellow card) 37'; Rømer (yellow card) 69'; Sambou (yellow card) 89'	Stadium: Right to Dream Park; Attendance: 300; Referee: Benjamin Willaume-Jantzen

25 October 2020 6	Horsens	1–1	Nordsjælland	Horsens
14:00 CEST	Hansson 16'; Lange (yellow card) 24'; Ludwig (yellow card) 90+5'	Report	Djourou (yellow card) 50'; Francis 88'	Stadium: CASA Arena Horsens; Referee: Anders Poulsen

31 October 2020 7	Nordsjælland	4–1	Midtjylland	Farum
16:00 CEST	Francis 11' (Jenssen) 45' (Diomande); Frese 52' (Francis); Sulemana 70' (Hansen)	FCM Report	James (yellow card) 33'; Dreyer 34'	Stadium: Right to Dream Park; Attendance: 300; Referee: Jakob A. Sundberg

8 November 2020 8	Nordsjælland	1–1	Vejle	Farum
14:00 CET	Jensen 4'; Mesík (yellow card) 29'; Sulemana (yellow card) 39'	Report	Faghir 22'; Ezatolahi (yellow card) 56'	Stadium: Right to Dream Park; Referee: Aydin Uslu

22 November 2020 9	AaB	1–1	Nordsjælland	Aalborg
14:00 CET	Fossum 62'	Report	Diomande 29'	Stadium: Aalborg Portland Park; Attendance: 300; Referee: Jonas Hansen

29 November 2020 10	AGF	1–3	Nordsjælland	Aarhus
18:00 CET	Mortensen 10'; Hvidt (yellow card) 90+5'	Report	Atanga 2', 57'; Sulemana 3' (yellow card) 45' (yellow-red card) 77'; Jensen (yellow card) 40'; Jenssen (yellow card) 53'	Stadium: Ceres Park; Attendance: 300; Referee: Peter Kjærsgaard-Andersen

6 December 2020 11	SønderjyskE	2–1	Nordsjælland	Haderslev
14:00 CET	Bah (yellow card) 18'; Simonsen 44'; Wright 47'; Albæk (yellow card) 90+1'	Report	Abu 52' (yellow card) 90+1'	Stadium: Sydbank Park; Attendance: 300; Referee: Benjamin Willaume-Jantzen

13 December 2020 12	Nordsjælland	0–1	Copenhagen	Farum
16:00 CET	Jenssen (yellow card) 48'; Sadiq (yellow card) 90+4'	Report	Zeca (yellow card) 57'; Falk (yellow card) 62'; Biel 81'	Stadium: Right to Dream Park; Attendance: 300; Referee: Jakob A. Sundberg

21 December 2020 13	Midtjylland	3–1	Nordsjælland	Herning
16:00 CET	Dreyer 8'; Scholz 12' (Dreyer); Kaba 67' (Cools)	FCM Summary	Mesík (yellow card) 33'; Rygaard 45+3'	Stadium: MCH Arena; Referee: Mads-Kristoffer Kristoffersen

4 February 2021 14	Nordsjælland	0–1	Brøndby	Farum
20:00 CET	Jenssen (yellow card) 45'	Report	Hedlund 13'; Frendrup (yellow card) 90+2'	Stadium: Right to Dream Park; Referee: Jakob Kehlet

7 February 2021 15	Nordsjælland	0–2	OB	Farum
14:00 CET		Report	Tverskov 6'; Hyllegaard 75'	Stadium: Right to Dream Park; Attendance: 0 Referee: Jens Grabski Maae

14 February 2021 16	Vejle	2–2	Nordsjælland	Vejle
14:00 CET	Mucolli 37'; Ezatolahi (yellow card) 72'; Kolinger 90+1'	Report	Djourou (yellow card) 56'; Sadiq (yellow card) 70'; Jenssen 72'; Jensen 86'	Stadium: Vejle Stadium; Referee: Jonas Hansen

21 February 2021 17	Randers	1–1	Nordsjælland	Randers
14:00 CET	Kehinde 43'; Rømer (yellow card) 60'; Høgh (yellow card) 90'	Report	Andersen 52'; Nnamani (yellow card) 81'	Stadium: Cepheus Park Randers; Referee: Aydin Uslu

28 February 2021 18	Nordsjælland	2–2	AaB	Farum
14:00 CET	Chukwuani 5'; Woledzi 67' (yellow card) 68'	Report	Prica 22'; Rinne (yellow card) 32'; Nielsen (yellow card) 55'; Højholt (yellow card) 60'; Fossum 77' (pen.)	Stadium: Right to Dream Park; Attendance: 0 Referee: Sandi Putros

3 March 2021 19	AGF	0–1	Nordsjælland	Aarhus
18:00	Sanneh (red card) 6'	Report	Jenssen 13'	Stadium: Ceres Park; Attendance: 0 Referee: Morten Krogh

7 March 2021 20	Nordsjælland	2–2	Horsens	Farum
18:00 CET	Sulemana (yellow card) 19'; Thychosen (yellow card) 25'; Andersen 27'; Sadiq 46'; Jenssen (yellow card) 89'; Mesík (yellow card) 90+2'	Report	Prip 16' (pen.); Gomez (yellow card) 45+2'; Thorsen 69'; Jacobsen (yellow card) 88'	Stadium: Right to Dream Park; Attendance: 0 Referee: Jørgen Burchardt

12 March 2021 21	Lyngby	0–3	Nordsjælland	Lyngby
19:00 CET	Crone (yellow card) 19'; Kornvig (yellow card) 81'; Gregor (red card) 83'	Report	Sadiq 4'; Christensen (yellow card) 15'; Sulemana (yellow card) 41'; Svensson (yellow card) 44'; Chukwuani (yellow card) 61'; Atanga 88'; Schjelderup 90+4'	Stadium: Lyngby Stadium; Attendance: 0 Referee: Jonas Hansen

21 March 2021 22	Nordsjælland	2–1	SønderjyskE	Farum
17:00 CET	Schjelderup 16', 34'		Thychosen 57' (o.g.)	Stadium: Right to Dream Park; Attendance: 0

===== Championship round =====
4 April 2021 23	Nordsjaelland	2–0	AGF	Farum
18:05	Sulemana 18'; Antman 87'	Report		Stadium: Right to Dream Park; Referee: Jakob A. Sundberg

11 April 2021 24	Randers	3–4	Nordsjælland	Randers
14:00 CET	Egho 32'; Hammershøy-Mistrati 54', 87'	Report	Jensen 9', 71'; Sulemana 29', 42'	Stadium: Randers Stadium; Attendance: 0 Referee: Jakob Kehlet

18 April 2021 25	Copenhagen	2–2	Nordsjælland	Copenhagen
16:00 CET	Lerager 10' (yellow card) 24'; Boilesen (red card); Ankersen 60' (Wind) (yellow card) 74'	FCK Summary	Sulamana 45' (Villadsen) (yellow card) 77'; Kofod Andersen (yellow card) 50'; Thychosen (yellow card) 58'; Adingra 90' (Antman)	Stadium: Parken Stadium; Attendance: 0 Referee: Mads-Kristoffer Kristoffersen

26 April 2021 27	Nordsjælland	3–2	Midtjylland	Farum
19:00 CEST	Onyeka 29' (o.g.); Sulemana 66' (pen.) (yellow card) 89'; Frese (yellow card) 74'; Tyhcosen (yellow card) 80'; Villadsen (yellow card) 84'; Adingra 90' (Kofod Andersen) (yellow card) 90+6'	FCM Summary	Kaba 45' (Cajuste); Sisto 54' (Anderson); Scholz (yellow card) 73'; Lössl (yellow card) 83'	Stadium: Right to Dream Park; Attendance: 1,793; Referee: Aydin Uslu

2 May 2021 28	Midtjylland	3–0	Nordsjælland	Herning
18:00 CEST	Scholz 22' (pen.); Sisto 24' (Dreyer); Onyeka 77' (Kaba)	FCM Summary	Jenssen (yellow card) 85'	Stadium: MCH Arena; Attendance: 4,450; Referee: Jens Maae

10 May 2021 29	Nordsjælland	2–2	Copenhagen	Farum
19:00 CEST	Sulemana 49' (Christensen); Christensen (yellow card) 58'; Frese 68' (Villadsen)	FCK Summary	Zanka (yellow card) 23'; Ankersen (yellow card) 33'; Stage 51' (Wind) 71' (Falk); Boilsen (yellow card) 56'	Stadium: Right to Dream Park; Attendance: 2,103; Referee: Sandi Putros

=== Danish Cup ===
8 October 2020 Second round	FC Græsrødderne	1–5	Nordsjælland	Gentofte
	Pedersen	Report	Nnamani; Jensen; Antman; Rothmann; Atanga	Stadium: Gentofte Sportspark

12 November 2020 Third round	Hvidovre	2–0	Nordsjælland	Hvidovre
	Christensen 5'; Thomsen 12'	Report		Stadium: Hvidovre Stadium

== Statistics ==
=== Goalscorers ===
Rank	No.	Pos	Nat	Name	Superliga	Danish Cup	Total
1	10	FW	(Ghana)	Kamaldeen Sulemana	10	0	10
2	12	FW	(Ghana)	Isaac Atanga	4	1	5
3	7	MF	(Denmark)	Mikkel Rygaard	3	1	4
3	41	MF	(Ghana)	Abu Francis	4	0	4
5	3	DF	(Norway)	Ulrik Yttergård Jenssen	3	0	3
5	4	MF	(Ivory Coast)	Mohammed Diomande	3	0	3
5	8	MF	(Denmark)	Magnus Kofod Andersen	3	0	3
5	22	MF	(Denmark)	Victor Jensen	3	0	3
5	32	MF	(Norway)	Andreas Schjelderup	3	0	3
5	34	FW	(Denmark)	Martin Frese	3	0	3
11	17	FW	(Ivory Coast)	Simon Adingra	2	0	2
11	37	FW	(Ghana)	Ibrahim Sadiq	2	0	2
11	42	MF	(Finland)	Oliver Antman	1	1	2
14	21	FW	(Denmark)	Emeka Nnamani	0	1	1
14	24	FW	(United States)	Jonathan Amon	1	0	1
14	29	FW	(Denmark)	Joachim Rothmann	0	1	1
14	36	DF	(Ghana)	Maxwell Woledzi	1	0	1
14	45	MF	(Denmark)	Tochi Chukwuani	1	0	1
Own goals					1	0	1
Totals					48	5	53

Last updated: 10 May 2021

=== Clean sheets ===
Rank	No.	Pos	Nat	Name	Superliga	Danish Cup	Total
1	1	GK	(Denmark)	Peter Vindahl Jensen	4	0	4
Totals					4	0	4

Last updated: 10 May 2021
