= Oliver Villadsen =

Danish footballer (born 2001)

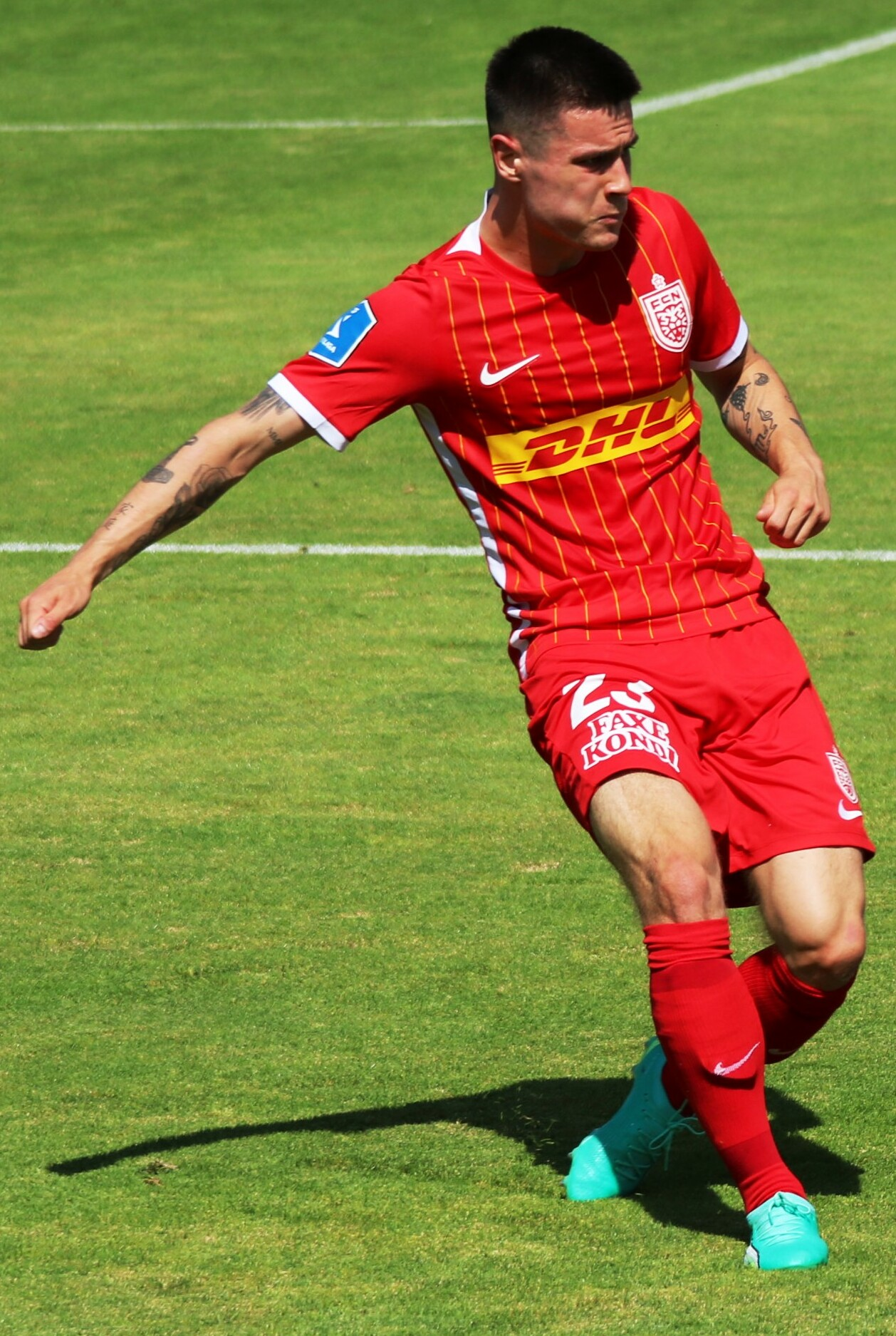
- Villadsen with Nordsjælland in 2023

Personal information
- Full name: Oliver Marc Rose-Villadsen
- Date of birth: 16 November 2001 (age 24)
- Place of birth: Allerød, Denmark
- Height: 1.73 m (5 ft 8 in)
- Position: Right-back

Team information
- Current team: Brøndby
- Number: 2

Youth career
- –2012: Blovstrød IF
- 2012–2013: Slangerup OIF
- 2013–2019: Nordsjælland

Senior career*
Years	Team	Apps	(Gls)
2019–2024	Nordsjælland	131	(6)
2024–2025	1. FC Nürnberg	26	(0)
2025–	Brøndby	41	(0)

International career
2016–2017	Denmark U16	6	(1)
2017–2018	Denmark U17	15	(1)
2018–2019	Denmark U18	7	(1)
2019–2020	Denmark U19	7	(0)
2021	Denmark U20	1	(0)
2021–2022	Denmark U21	3	(0)
- * Club domestic league appearances and goals as of 23 October 2026

Oliver Marc Rose-Villadsen (born 16 November 2001) is a Danish professional footballer who plays as a right-back for Danish Superliga club Brøndby.

Villadsen came through the FC Nordsjælland academy. He made his first-team debut in 2019 and went on to make 151 appearances for the club. He joined 2. Bundesliga club 1. FC Nürnberg in 2024 and returned to Denmark with Brøndby a year later. Villadsen won 39 caps for Denmark's youth teams from under-16 to under-21 level.

== Early life ==
Villadsen grew up in Allerød. He started playing football at his local club Blovstrød IF, where his father was a coach. He was later scouted by Nordsjælland. He first spent six months at Slangerup OIF to prepare for the move.

== Club career ==
=== Nordsjælland ===
Villadsen joined Nordsjælland in 2010. By 2015, he was playing for the club's under-15 team, while attending school at Bagsværd Kostskole. On his 15th birthday in November 2016, he signed a three-year youth contract with Nordsjælland. At the time, he played as a right winger for the under-17 team. By 2018, he was playing for the under-19 team while still eligible for under-17 football.

Villadsen extended his contract on 25 July 2019, keeping him at the club until the summer of 2022. He had been part of the squad for the opening match of the season against AC Horsens. On 11 August 2019, Villadsen made his Superliga debut in a 2–2 home draw with Silkeborg in the 2019–20 season, replacing Mohammed Kudus in the 75th minute.

On 2 August 2021, Villadsen scored his first Superliga goal in a 2–0 away win over SønderjyskE in the 2021–22 season; a rebound after his volley was saved. The win was Nordsjælland's first of the season. On 1 October 2021, he signed a new contract until the summer of 2025. He had made 44 Superliga appearances by then. Nordsjælland finished ninth that season.

The club finished as runners-up in the following season, qualifying them for European football. On 24 August 2023, Villadsen scored in a 5–0 home win over Partizan in the first leg of the 2023–24 UEFA Europa Conference League play-off round. On 21 September 2023, he scored in a 3–1 away defeat to Fenerbahçe in the group stage. Nordsjælland lost 1–0 away to Ludogorets in the final group match, knocking them out despite their ten points.

In July 2024, Nordsjælland agreed to sell Villadsen to 2. Bundesliga club 1. FC Nürnberg with one year left on his contract. All parties had agreed that he would stay until mid-August to help Nordsjælland start the 2024–25 season. Nordsjælland confirmed his departure on 12 August 2024. He left after 151 first-team appearances.

=== 1. FC Nürnberg ===
Villadsen joined Nürnberg on 12 August 2024 for a reported fee of around €1 million plus bonuses. He was handed the number 2 shirt. Nürnberg were coached by Miroslav Klose at the time. Villadsen made 26 league appearances and provided two assists in the 2024–25 season. He also played twice in the DFB-Pokal.

=== Brøndby ===
On 17 July 2025, Villadsen left Nürnberg's training camp in South Tyrol to join Brøndby with immediate effect. He signed a four-year contract running until the summer of 2029. He had reportedly agreed a return to Nordsjælland before Brøndby made their approach. Villadsen made his Brøndby debut as a substitute against Silkeborg in the opening match of the 2025–26 season.

In July 2026, Villadsen said he had struggled to find his best level at Brøndby. He said the playing style under head coach Steve Cooper had perhaps not suited his type of player. Head coach Thomas Nørgaard said Villadsen was in a markedly better place than when he took over from Cooper.

== International career ==
Villadsen was selected for the Denmark under-16 team in June 2016 after a four-day training camp in Vildbjerg. He played in both of the team's friendly wins over Hungary later that year. On 24 March 2018, he scored the winning goal in the 78th minute of a 2–1 win over France in the elite round of qualifying for the 2018 UEFA European Under-17 Championship. He was part of the Denmark squad at the final tournament in England. Denmark lost all three of their group matches and were eliminated.

Villadsen also played for the under-18, under-19 and under-20 teams. New under-21 head coach Jesper Sørensen named him in his first squad in August 2021. The squad was picked for a home friendly against Greece and a European Under-21 Championship qualifier away to Kazakhstan. Villadsen won three caps at under-21 level. In total, he made 39 appearances and scored three goals for Denmark's youth teams.

== Style of play ==
Villadsen played as a right winger in Nordsjælland's youth teams. He was converted into a deeper role during his time in the academy, and in 2018 the club's under-19 head coach Morten Karlsen said he had moved from the wing to wing-back. Karlsen called his pace extraordinary but said he still needed to improve technically. By October 2021 Nordsjælland were describing him as an attacking wing-back.

Assessments made after he left Denmark credited him with technique as well as speed. Nürnberg's sporting director Olaf Rebbe said he combined pace, intensity and aggression with creativity and technique, and on his arrival at Brøndby the club's director of football Benjamin Schmedes described him as a dynamic and attacking right-back. Villadsen himself has identified the defensive side of the position as his weakness, saying in July 2026 that defending had always been a problem for him and that he was working on it.

== Career statistics ==
As of match played 23 October 2026

Appearances and goals by club, season and competition
Club	Season	League			National cup (Note: Includes Danish Cup, DFB-Pokal)		Europe		Other		Total	
Club	Season	Division	Apps	Goals	Apps	Goals	Apps	Goals	Apps	Goals	Apps	Goals
Nordsjælland	2019–20	Danish Superliga	11	0	0	0	—		—		11	0
Nordsjælland	2020–21	Danish Superliga	23	0	2	0	—		—		25	0
Nordsjælland	2021–22	Danish Superliga	32	5	2	0	—		—		34	5
Nordsjælland	2022–23	Danish Superliga	31	0	5	0	—		—		36	0
Nordsjælland	2023–24	Danish Superliga	30	1	5	0	6 (Note: Appearance(s) in UEFA Conference League)	2	—		41	2
Nordsjælland	2024–25	Danish Superliga	4	0	0	0	—		—		4	0
Nordsjælland	Total		131	6	14	0	6	2	—		151	8
1. FC Nürnberg	2024–25	2. Bundesliga	26	0	2	0	—		—		28	0
Brøndby	2025–26	Danish Superliga	29	0	2	0	5	0	1 (Note: Appearance in Danish Superliga play-off)	0	37	0
Brøndby	2026–27	Danish Superliga	12	0	1	0	—		—		13	0
Brøndby	Total		41	0	3	0	5	0	1	0	50	0
Career total			198	6	19	0	11	2	1	0	229	8
