= Huldahl =

Huldahl is a surname. Notable people with the surname include:

- Jeppe Huldahl (born 1982), Danish golfer
- Martin Huldahl (born 2004), Danish footballer
