= Kamaldeen Sulemana =

Ghanaian footballer (born 2002)

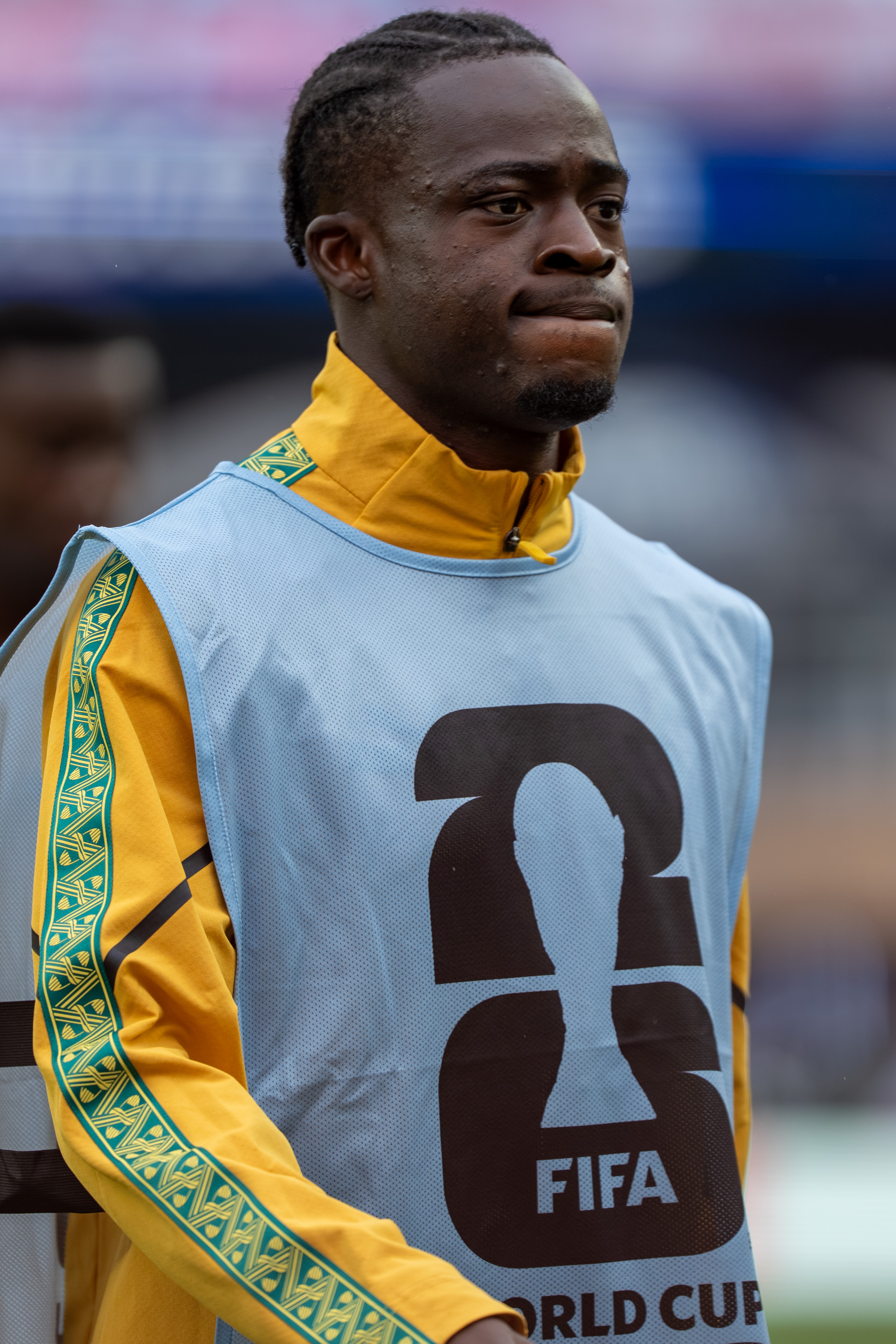
- Sulemana with Ghana in 2026

Personal information
- Full name: Kamaldeen Sulemana
- Date of birth: 15 February 2002 (age 24)
- Place of birth: Techiman, Ghana
- Height: 1.75 m (5 ft 9 in)
- Position: Forward

Team information
- Current team: Atalanta
- Number: 7

Youth career
- 2011–2013: Techiman Liberty FC
- 2013–2020: Right to Dream

Senior career*
Years	Team	Apps	(Gls)
2020–2021	Nordsjælland	42	(14)
2021–2023	Rennes	34	(5)
2023–2025	Southampton	69	(3)
2025–	Atalanta	27	(2)

International career^{‡}
2020–	Ghana	30	(1)
- * Club domestic league appearances and goals as of 06:33, 19 November 2026 (UTC) ‡ National team caps and goals as of 27 June 2026

Kamaldeen Sulemana (born 15 February 2002), also known simply as Kamaldeen, is a Ghanaian professional footballer who plays as a forward for Serie A club Atalanta and the Ghana national team.

== Club career ==
=== Nordsjælland ===
Born in Techiman, Bono East Region, Kamaldeen was a part of the Right to Dream Academy before joining its cooperative club in Denmark, Nordsjælland, in January 2020. He signed a five-year deal with the club on his 18th birthday and made his debut for the club a week later, 22 February 2020, against SønderjyskE in the Danish Superliga. Kamaldeen started on the bench, but replaced Mohammed Diomande in the 61st minute.

In August 2020, he was handed shirt number 10, after the departure of Mohammed Kudus to Ajax. He has been considered as one of the most promising young talents of the Danish Superliga, regarded for his technical ability, his dribbling and his speed, making him one of the most creative players in the league. During the 2020–21 winter transfer window, his name was linked with several European clubs interested in him, in particular Ajax and Bayer Leverkusen, without this amounting to a move.

After scoring five goals in five games, Kamaldeen was voted the Superliga Player of the Month for April 2021.

=== Rennes ===
On 16 July 2021, Kamaldeen signed a five-year contract with Ligue 1 club Rennes, for a reported €20 million. Thereby, he surpassed the former Danish leagues transfer record holder, Alexander Sørloth.

Kamaldeen made his full debut for Rennes on 8 August 2021 against Lens in the first game of the Ligue 1 season. He scored Rennes' only goal after 14 minutes in a game that ended 1–1.

=== Southampton ===
On 1 February 2023, Sulemana signed a four-and-a-half-year contract with Southampton. On 4 February 2023, he made his first Premier League appearance in a 3–0 defeat against Brentford, replacing Ibrahima Diallo at half-time. On 28 May 2023, Sulemana scored his first Premier League goals in a 4–4 draw with Liverpool.

On 15 September 2023, he was given a red card by Bobby Madley for a foul on James Justin in injury time during Southampton's 4–1 home defeat to Leicester City, with manager Russell Martin stating that he hoped the club "have grounds to appeal". The red card issued was subsequently rescinded. During a 1–0 victory against Bristol City on 29 November 2023, Sulemana suffered a hamstring injury and was expected to be sidelined until late January.

=== Atalanta ===
On 2 July 2025, he joined Serie A club Atalanta for a fee of around €17 million., reuniting with coach Ivan Jurić. He made his debut for the Bergamo-based club on 24 August, coming on as a substitute for Daniel Maldini in the second half of the opening league match, which ended in a 1–1 home draw against Pisa.

On 21 September, he scored his first goal for Atalanta in a 3–0 away victory over Torino. He made his UEFA Champions League debut on 30 September, coming off the bench in a 2–1 home win against Belgian club Club Brugge.

== International career ==
Kamaldeen received his first call-up for the Ghana national team on 25 September 2020 ahead of the game against Mali. He debuted with Ghana in a 3–0 friendly loss to Mali on 9 October 2020. Kamaldeen was also used in the friendly game against Qatar three days later, when he came on as a substitute for the last 30 minutes.

In December 2021, Sulemana was named in coach Milovan Rajevac's squad for the 2021 Africa Cup of Nations in Cameroon. On 14 November 2022, he was selected by Otto Addo to take part in the 2022 FIFA World Cup in Qatar.

Kamaldeen is part of the Ghana U-23 football team that will be participating at 2023 U-23 Africa Cup of Nations (AFCON) in Morocco.

On 2 June 2026, Sulemana was named in head coach Carlos Queiroz's 26-man squad for the 2026 FIFA World Cup.

== Personal life ==
Kamaldeen Sulemana is the older brother of Randers-player Abdul Hakim Sulemana. Their older brother, Abdul-Rauf Sulemana, also plays football and, like his two younger brothers, has also played football in Denmark.

Sulemana's father is Gonja and his mother is Dagomba. He is a Muslim.

== Career statistics ==
=== Club ===
As of match played 5 November 2026

Appearances and goals by club, season and competition
Club	Season	League			National cup (Note: Includes Danish Cup, Coupe de France, FA Cup, Coppa Italia)		League cup (Note: Includes EFL Cup)		Europe		Other		Total	
Club	Season	Division	Apps	Goals	Apps	Goals	Apps	Goals	Apps	Goals	Apps	Goals	Apps	Goals
Nordsjælland	2019–20	Danish Superliga	13	4	0	0	—		—		—		13	4
Nordsjælland	2020–21	Danish Superliga	29	10	1	0	—		—		—		30	10
Nordsjælland	Total		42	14	1	0	—		—		—		43	14
Rennes	2021–22	Ligue 1	20	4	1	0	—		6 (Note: Appearance(s) in UEFA Europa Conference League)	1	—		27	5
Rennes	2022–23	Ligue 1	14	1	1	0	—		4 (Note: Appearances in UEFA Europa League)	0	—		29	1
Rennes	Total		34	5	2	0	—		10	1	—		46	6
Rennes B	2021–22	CFA 3	1	0	—		—		—		—		1	0
Southampton	2022–23	Premier League	18	2	0	0	—		—		—		18	2
Southampton	2023–24	Championship	25	0	1	0	0	0	—		0	0	26	0
Southampton	2024–25	Premier League	26	1	2	1	2	0	—		—		30	2
Southampton	Total		69	3	3	1	2	0	—		0	0	74	4
Atalanta	2025–26	Serie A	25	2	3	1	—		9 (Note: Appearances in UEFA Champions League)	0	—		37	3
Atalanta	2026–27	Serie A	2	0	0	0	—		1	0	—		3	0
Atalanta	Total		27	2	3	1	—		10	0	—		40	3
Career total			173	24	9	2	2	0	20	1	0	0	204	27

=== International ===
As of match played 27 June 2026

Appearances and goals by national team and year
National team	Year	Apps	Goals
Ghana	2020	2	0
Ghana	2021	5	0
Ghana	2022	8	0
Ghana	2023	3	0
Ghana	2024	1	0
Ghana	2025	6	1
Ghana	2026	5	0
Total		30	1

Scores and results list Ghana's goal tally first, score column indicates score after each Sulemana goal.

List of international goals scored by Kamaldeen Sulemana
No.	Date	Venue	Opponent	Score	Result	Competition
1	8 October 2025	Ben M'Hamed El Abdi Stadium, El Jadida, Morocco	Central African Republic	5–0	5–0	2026 FIFA World Cup qualification

== Honours ==
Southampton

- EFL Championship play-offs: 2024
