= Andreas Schjelderup =

Norwegian footballer (born 2004)

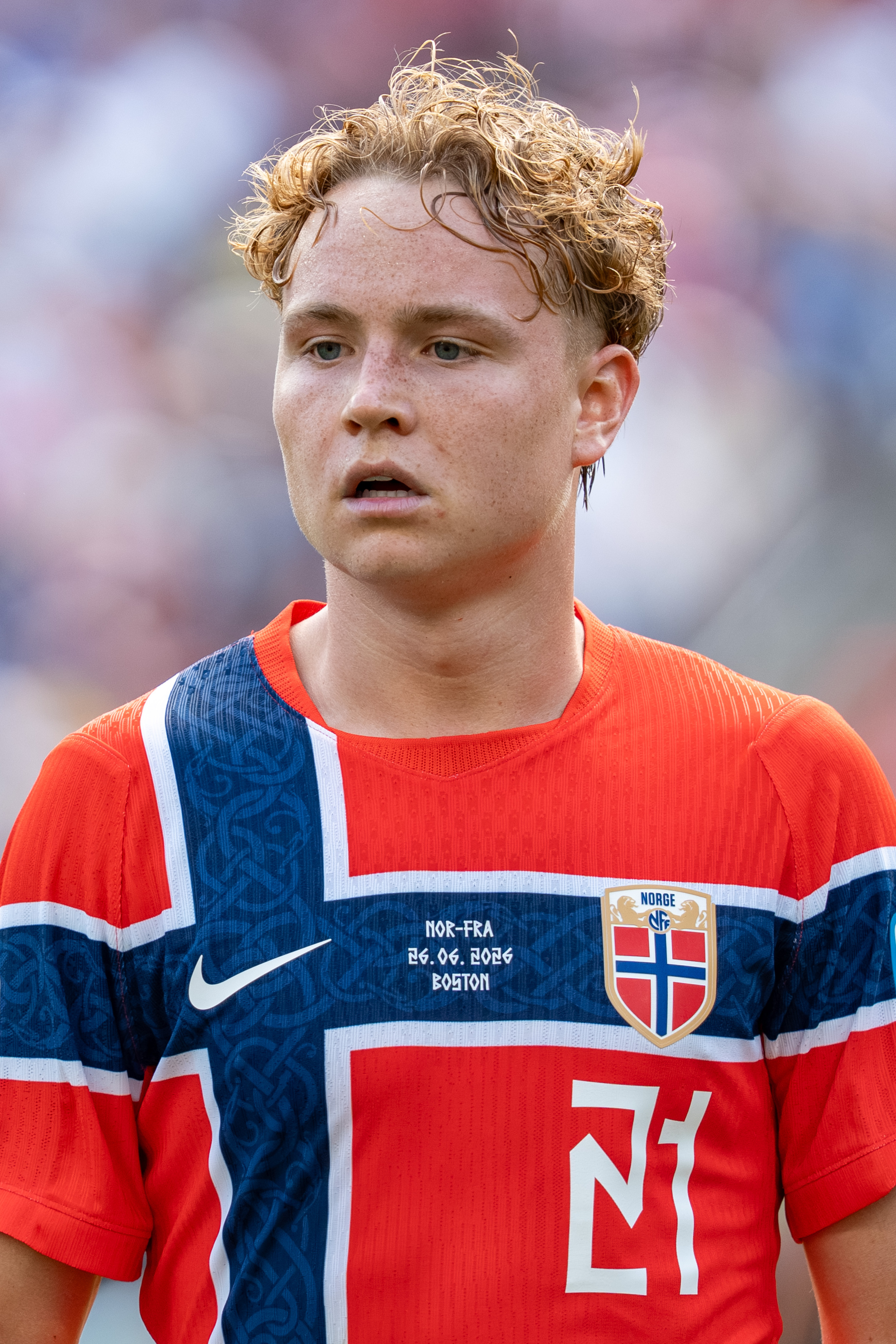
- Schjelderup with Norway in 2026

Personal information
- Full name: Andreas Rædergård Schjelderup
- Date of birth: 1 June 2004 (age 22)
- Place of birth: Bodø, Norway
- Height: 1.77 m (5 ft 10 in)
- Positions: Left winger; forward

Team information
- Current team: Benfica
- Number: 21

Youth career
- –2020: Bodø/Glimt
- 2020–2021: Nordsjælland

Senior career*
Years	Team	Apps	(Gls)
2021–2023	Nordsjælland	55	(17)
2023	Benfica B	5	(1)
2023–	Benfica	59	(9)
2023–2024	→ Nordsjælland (loan)	26	(9)

International career^{‡}
2019	Norway U15	8	(2)
2020	Norway U16	3	(0)
2021–2022	Norway U18	5	(0)
2022–2023	Norway U19	6	(2)
2021–2024	Norway U21	12	(8)
2024–	Norway	24	(3)
- * Club domestic league appearances and goals as of 20:26, 2 November 2026 (UTC) ‡ National team caps and goals as of 17 November 2026

Andreas Rædergård Schjelderup (born 1 June 2004) is a Norwegian professional footballer who plays as a left winger or forward for Primeira Liga club Benfica and the Norway national team.

== Club career ==
=== Early years ===
Born in Bodø, Norway, Schjelderup began his career in the youth sector at Bodø/Glimt. Schjelderup was coveted by many big clubs throughout Europe, including reported interest from clubs in top leagues in Italy, Spain and the Netherlands.

=== Nordsjælland ===
In July 2020, Schjelderup chose to move to Denmark to sign with Superliga club Nordsjælland. He was promoted to the Nordsjælland first team following the winter break during the 2020–21 season. He made his senior debut from the starting eleven, in a 2–0 defeat to OB on 7 February 2021. Aged 16 years and 248 days old, he became the 13th youngest player in Superliga history. He scored his first senior goal for the club in a 3–0 win over local rivals Lyngby on 12 March. In doing so, he became the club's record youngest goalscorer in Superliga history, edging out teammate Tochi Chukwuani's record set the previous season, and the fourth youngest overall in league history. On 21 March, the final day of the 2020–21 Danish Superliga regular season, Schjelderup scored both goals in Nordsjælland's 2–1 defeat of SønderjyskE, leapfrogging his club above SønderjyskE and into sixth place, securing the final spot in the Superliga championship play-offs.

=== Benfica ===
On 12 January 2023, Schjelderup signed a five-year contract with Primeira Liga side Benfica. The fee reported by Portuguese media was around €14 million. Danish media reported, however, that the fee was 105 million kroner (approximately €10 million), and Nordsjælland also secured 20% of a potential future sale. Schjelderup made his Benfica debut in the Primeira Liga, against Marítimo on 12 March 2023. Later on, Schjelderup made his UEFA Champions League debut against Italian side Inter Milan.

The Norwegian had a difficult start to his stay at Benfica. In the first six months, he only made two brief appearances for the first team, while he also made five appearances for the club's B team.

==== 2023–24 season: Return to Nordsjælland (loan) ====
On 2 September 2023, Nordsjælland announced that Schjelderup would be returning to the club on a season-long loan deal from Benfica, with the Danish club paying a €2.5 million loan fee. In May he was named the spring season's best player by Danish league managers.

==== 2024–25 season: First-team breakthrough ====
On 27 October 2024, Schjelderup scored his first goal for Benfica in a 5–0 win over Rio Ave in the Primeira Liga. On 11 January 2025, he scored in the final of the Taça da Liga as Benfica defeated Sporting on penalties following a 1–1 draw in normal time. Three days later, on 14 October 2024, he scored in the fifth round of the Taça de Portugal as Benfica won 1–3 away at Farense.

On 24 June 2025, he scored the only goal in a 1–0 victory over Bayern Munich, securing his club's first-ever win against the latter and top spot in Group C in the 2025 FIFA Club World Cup.

==== 2025–26 season ====
On 12 August 2025, he was in the starting eleven for Benfica against Nice in the Champions League third qualifying round. He assisted for the team's first goal and scored the second, helping secure a 2–0 win, 4–0 on aggregate, ensuring Benfica's sport in the play-off round. Later in the season, he completed an awards hat-trick after being named the Primeira Liga's Player of the Month, Forward of the Month and Young Player of the Month for April. He finished the campaign with a career-best return of 10 goals and six assists for the club across all competitions.

== International career ==
Schjelderup received his first call-up to the Norway under-21 national team in August 2021 by head coach Leif Gunnar Smerud. It was uncommon for a 17-year-old player to be selected for the under-21 squad, with Martin Ødegaard being the last to achieve the feat in 2014. He made his debut for the Norway under-21 national team on 3 September 2021 in a match against Austria. Norway won the match 3–1.

In May 2024, Schjelderup received his first call-up to the Norway national team by head coach Ståle Solbakken. He made his senior international debut during that international window on 5 June 2024 in a friendly against Kosovo, coming on as a substitute for Erling Haaland. Norway won the match 3–0.

On 21 May 2026, Schjelderup was named by Norway head coach Ståle Solbakken in the 26-man squad for the 2026 FIFA World Cup. In the Round of 16 against Brazil, he assisted both of Erling Haaland's goals in a 2–1 victory that sent his team to their first-ever World Cup quarter-final. He scored his first World Cup goal, opening the scoring with a left-footed shot from the left side of the penalty area in the quarter-final against England, which ended in a 2–1 defeat after extra time.

== Style of play ==
Schjelderup is regarded as a highly skillful and technical player capable of playing in several offensive positions, due to his versatility; throughout his career, he has been deployed occasionally as a striker or second striker, but even though his natural position is that of an attacking midfielder, he plays primarily as a left winger. Schjelderup tends to hug the touchline off the ball. He receives possession from teammates out wide before cutting inside and driving towards more central areas, thus ensuring that he can pick up the ball with space and time before looking to make a real impact. Schjelderup also has the ability to draw defenders toward him. That opens up space for his teammates to exploit. Another aspect of his game is his dribbling, Schjelderup has extremely quick feet and excellent agility in one-on-one duels. When making attacking runs off the ball, Schjelderup’s main objective is to create lateral separation. He very rarely tries to make runs in behind, and instead prefers to make runs out wide and receive in front of the defence. Schjelderup idolises Norwegians Martin Ødegaard and Erling Haaland, being compared to the latter due to his goalscoring abilities.

== Legal history ==
On 19 November 2025, Schjelderup was convicted in Denmark of "possession or sharing of sexual material which features people under the age of 18", after he admitted to forwarding a Snapchat video containing "sexual content" of two boys under the age of 18 to four of his friends. He was handed a 14-day sentence, suspended for 12 months. He had previously posted a statement about the incident, which happened when he was 19, calling it a "stupid mistake".

== Career statistics ==
=== Club ===
As of match played 5 November 2026

Appearances and goals by club, season and competition
Club	Season	League			National cup (Note: Includes Danish Cup, Taça de Portugal)		League cup (Note: Includes Taça da Liga)		Europe		Other		Total	
Club	Season	Division	Apps	Goals	Apps	Goals	Apps	Goals	Apps	Goals	Apps	Goals	Apps	Goals
Nordsjælland	2020–21	Danish Superliga	16	3	0	0	—		—		—		16	3
Nordsjælland	2021–22	Danish Superliga	22	4	1	0	—		—		—		23	4
Nordsjælland	2022–23	Danish Superliga	17	10	0	0	—		—		—		17	10
Nordsjælland	Total		55	17	1	0	—		—		—		56	17
Benfica B	2022–23	Liga Portugal 2	5	1	—		—		—		—		5	1
Benfica	2022–23	Primeira Liga	1	0	0	0	—		1 (Note: Appearance(s) in UEFA Champions League)	0	—		2	0
Benfica	2023–24	Primeira Liga	0	0	—		—		—		1 (Note: Appearance in Supertaça Cândido de Oliveira)	0	1	0
Benfica	2024–25	Primeira Liga	20	1	7	2	3	1	7	0	3 (Note: Appearances in FIFA Club World Cup)	1	40	5
Benfica	2025–26	Primeira Liga	28	7	4	0	1	0	10	3	0	0	43	10
Benfica	2026–27	Primeira Liga	10	1	0	0	1	0	9 (Note: Appearances in UEFA Europa League)	1	—		20	2
Benfica	Total		59	9	11	2	5	1	27	4	4	1	106	17
Nordsjælland (loan)	2023–24	Danish Superliga	26	9	6	1	—		6 (Note: Appearances in UEFA Europa Conference League)	0	—		38	10
Career total			145	36	18	3	5	1	33	4	4	1	205	45

=== International ===
As of match played 17 November 2026

Appearances and goals by national team and year
National team	Year	Apps	Goals
Norway	2024	1	0
Norway	2025	7	0
Norway	2026	16	3
Total		24	3

Norway score listed first, score column indicates score after each Schjelderup goal.

List of international goals scored by Andreas Schjelderup
No.	Date	Venue	Opponent	Score	Result	Competition
1	27 March 2026	Johan Cruyff Arena, Amsterdam, Netherlands	Netherlands	1–0	1–2	Friendly
2	11 July 2026	Hard Rock Stadium, Miami Gardens, United States	England	1–0	1–2 (a.e.t.)	2026 FIFA World Cup
3	14 November 2026	Ullevaal Stadion, Oslo, Norway	Wales	2–0	3–1	2026–27 UEFA Nations League

== Honours ==
Benfica

- Primeira Liga: 2022–23
- Taça da Liga: 2024–25
- Supertaça Cândido de Oliveira: 2023, 2025

Individual

- Primeira Liga Player of the Month: April 2026
