= List of Danish football transfers winter 2020–21 =

This is a list of Danish football transfers for the 2020-21 winter transfer window. Only moves featuring at least one Danish Superliga club are listed.

The winter transfer window opened on 1 January 2021. The window closed at midnight on 1 February 2021.

== Danish Superliga ==
=== AaB ===
In: Note: Flags indicate national team as defined under FIFA eligibility rules; some limited exceptions apply. Players may hold more than one non-FIFA nationality.

No.	Pos.	Nation	Player
18	MF	NOR	Martin Samuelsen (on loan from (England) Hull City)
20	MF	DEN	Oliver Klitten (loan return from (Norway) Haugesund)
30	FW	ESP	Rufo (from (Norway) Sandefjord)
31	DF	NOR	Daniel Granli (from (Sweden) AIK, previously on loan)
35	FW	DEN	Marcus Hannesbo (Promoted)
-	DF	DEN	Anders Hagelskjær (from Silkeborg, coming in the summer)

Out: Note: Flags indicate national team as defined under FIFA eligibility rules; some limited exceptions apply. Players may hold more than one non-FIFA nationality.

No.	Pos.	Nation	Player
5	DF	DEN	Jores Okore (to (China) Changchun Yatai)
28	MF	DEN	Jeppe Pedersen (on loan to Skive)
32	DF	DEN	Kasper Pedersen (to Esbjerg)
33	DF	DEN	Thomas Christansen (to Vendsyssel)

=== AGF ===
In: Note: Flags indicate national team as defined under FIFA eligibility rules; some limited exceptions apply. Players may hold more than one non-FIFA nationality.

No.	Pos.	Nation	Player
15	DF	GAM	Bubacarr Sanneh (on loan from (Belgium) Anderlecht)
19	MF	AUS	Daniel Arzani (on loan from (England) Manchester City)
23	FW	DEN	Mathias Jørgensen (on loan from (United States) New York Red Bulls)
38	FW	DEN	Alexander Ammitzbøll (loan return from (Norway) Haugesund)
-	MF	DEN	Frederik Brandhof (from Viborg, coming in the summer)

Out: Note: Flags indicate national team as defined under FIFA eligibility rules; some limited exceptions apply. Players may hold more than one non-FIFA nationality.

No.	Pos.	Nation	Player
-	DF	DEN	Mikkel Lassen (on loan to Skive)
-	MF	DEN	Magnus Kaastrup (to Lyngby)
-	FW	DEN	Nicklas Helenius (to Silkeborg)

=== Brøndby ===
In: Note: Flags indicate national team as defined under FIFA eligibility rules; some limited exceptions apply. Players may hold more than one non-FIFA nationality.

No.	Pos.	Nation	Player
12	DF	DEN	Michael Lumb (from Horsens)
20	MF	SWE	Oskar Fallenius (from (Sweden) Brommapojkarna)
-	MF	USA	Christian Cappis (from Hobro, coming in the summer)

Out: Note: Flags indicate national team as defined under FIFA eligibility rules; some limited exceptions apply. Players may hold more than one non-FIFA nationality.

No.	Pos.	Nation	Player
28	DF	DEN	Anton Skipper (on loan to Hobro)

=== Copenhagen ===
In: Note: Flags indicate national team as defined under FIFA eligibility rules; some limited exceptions apply. Players may hold more than one non-FIFA nationality.

No.	Pos.	Nation	Player
12	MF	DEN	Lukas Lerager (on loan from (Italy) Genoa)
28	FW	GAB	Mustapha Bundu (on loan from (Belgium) Anderlecht)

Out: Note: Flags indicate national team as defined under FIFA eligibility rules; some limited exceptions apply. Players may hold more than one non-FIFA nationality.

No.	Pos.	Nation	Player
3	DF	SWE	Pierre Bengtsson (on loan to Vejle)
24	MF	CRO	Robert Mudražija (on loan to (Croatia) Rijeka)
26	MF	DEN	Alexander Hjælmhof (to HIK)
27	DF	ISL	Ragnar Sigurðsson (to (Ukraine) Rukh Lviv)
-	DF	DEN	Jacob Haahr (to Fremad Amager)
-	MF	DEN	Ahmed Daghim (to Kolding)
-	FW	URU	Michael Santos (released)

=== Horsens ===
In: Note: Flags indicate national team as defined under FIFA eligibility rules; some limited exceptions apply. Players may hold more than one non-FIFA nationality.

No.	Pos.	Nation	Player
5	DF	DEN	Søren Reese (on loan from Midtjylland)
6	DF	DEN	Nikolas Dyhr (on loan from Midtjylland)
22	GK	DEN	Aleksandar Stankovic (from (Norway) Brattvåg)
24	DF	GAM	James Gomez (from (The Gambia) Real de Banjul, previously on loan)

Out: Note: Flags indicate national team as defined under FIFA eligibility rules; some limited exceptions apply. Players may hold more than one non-FIFA nationality.

No.	Pos.	Nation	Player
2	DF	DEN	Thor Lange (on loan to Fremad Amager)
22	GK	USA	Michael Lansing (to (Norway) Aalesund)
-	DF	DEN	Michael Lumb (to Brøndby)
-	DF	DEN	Peter Therkildsen (to (Norway) Haugesund, previously on loan)
-	MF	DEN	Mikkel Mena Qvist (on loan to HB Køge)

=== Lyngby ===
In: Note: Flags indicate national team as defined under FIFA eligibility rules; some limited exceptions apply. Players may hold more than one non-FIFA nationality.

No.	Pos.	Nation	Player
4	DF	DEN	Svenn Crone (from Silkeborg)
11	MF	DEN	Magnus Kaastrup (from AGF)
15	FW	DEN	Justin Shaibu (from Fredericia)

Out: Note: Flags indicate national team as defined under FIFA eligibility rules; some limited exceptions apply. Players may hold more than one non-FIFA nationality.

No.	Pos.	Nation	Player
-	DF	DEN	Nicolai Geertsen (to Helsingør)
-	MF	DEN	Emilio Simonsen (to Køge)
-	FW	DEN	André Riel (released)

=== Midtjylland ===
In: Note: Flags indicate national team as defined under FIFA eligibility rules; some limited exceptions apply. Players may hold more than one non-FIFA nationality.

No.	Pos.	Nation	Player
17	DF	BRA	Ailton (from (Germany) VfB Stuttgart)
49	GK	DEN	Jonas Lössl (from (England) Everton)

Out: Note: Flags indicate national team as defined under FIFA eligibility rules; some limited exceptions apply. Players may hold more than one non-FIFA nationality.

No.	Pos.	Nation	Player
89	FW	DEN	Ronnie Schwartz (to (England) Charlton Athletic)
-	DF	DEN	Nikolas Dyhr (on loan to Horsens)
-	DF	DEN	Søren Reese (on loan to Horsens)
-	MF	GHA	Michael Baidoo (to (Norway) Jerv, previously on loan, later sold to (Norway) Sandnes Ulf)
—	FW	DEN	Sebastian Buch Jensen (on loan to (Norway) Start)
-	MF	FIN	Kaan Kairinen (to (Norway) Lillestrøm, previously on loan)
-	MF	BUL	Bozhidar Kraev (on loan to (Portugal) Famalicão)
-	FW	NGA	Jibril Antala Abubakar (to (Norway) HamKam)
-	FW	CRC	Mayron George (on loan to (France) Pau, previously on loan at (Sweden) Kalmar)

=== Nordsjælland ===
In: Note: Flags indicate national team as defined under FIFA eligibility rules; some limited exceptions apply. Players may hold more than one non-FIFA nationality.

No.	Pos.	Nation	Player
22	MF	DEN	Victor Jensen (on loan from (Netherlands) Ajax)

Out: Note: Flags indicate national team as defined under FIFA eligibility rules; some limited exceptions apply. Players may hold more than one non-FIFA nationality.

No.	Pos.	Nation	Player
29	FW	DEN	Joachim Rothmann (on loan to (Norway) Tromsø)

=== OB ===
In: Note: Flags indicate national team as defined under FIFA eligibility rules; some limited exceptions apply. Players may hold more than one non-FIFA nationality.

No.	Pos.	Nation	Player
12	FW	DEN	Bashkim Kadrii (from (Saudi Arabia) Al Fateh)
16	DF	NOR	Jørgen Skjelvik (from (United States) LA Galaxy, previously on loan)

Out: Note: Flags indicate national team as defined under FIFA eligibility rules; some limited exceptions apply. Players may hold more than one non-FIFA nationality.

No.	Pos.	Nation	Player
10	FW	NOR	Sander Svendsen (on loan to (Norway) Odd, previously on loan at (Norway) Brann)
22	DF	DEN	Daniel Obbekjær (on loan to (Italy) SPAL)
24	DF	DEN	Marco Lund (to (Sweden) Norrköping)

=== Randers ===
In: Note: Flags indicate national team as defined under FIFA eligibility rules; some limited exceptions apply. Players may hold more than one non-FIFA nationality.

No.	Pos.	Nation	Player
16	MF	NOR	Lasse Berg Johnsen (from (Norway) Raufoss)

Out: Note: Flags indicate national team as defined under FIFA eligibility rules; some limited exceptions apply. Players may hold more than one non-FIFA nationality.

No.	Pos.	Nation	Player
6	DF	DEN	André Rømer (to (Sweden) Elfsborg)
24	MF	NIG	Issah Salou (to Jammerbugt)

=== SønderjyskE ===
In: Note: Flags indicate national team as defined under FIFA eligibility rules; some limited exceptions apply. Players may hold more than one non-FIFA nationality.

No.	Pos.	Nation	Player
3	DF	SWE	Emil Holm (from (Sweden) Göteborg)
11	FW	NOR	Bård Finne (from (Norway) Vålerenga)
18	MF	BFA	Adama Guira (from (Hong Kong) R&F)

Out: Note: Flags indicate national team as defined under FIFA eligibility rules; some limited exceptions apply. Players may hold more than one non-FIFA nationality.

No.	Pos.	Nation	Player
-	DF	DEN	Mads Steenberg (to Middelfart)
-	MF	DEN	Johan Absalonsen (retired)
-	MF	DEN	Alexander Bah (to (Czech Republic) Slavia Prague)
-	MF	NGA	Ogenyi Onazi (released)

=== Vejle ===
In: Note: Flags indicate national team as defined under FIFA eligibility rules; some limited exceptions apply. Players may hold more than one non-FIFA nationality.

No.	Pos.	Nation	Player
8	MF	DEN	Lukas Engel (from Fremad Amager)
13	FW	RUS	German Onugkha (on loan from (Russia) Krasnodar)
22	DF	CRO	Denis Kolinger (from (Croatia) Lokomotiva)
23	MF	FRA	Hugo Ekitike (on loan from (France) Reims)
24	DF	CRO	Dominik Kovačić (on loan from (Croatia) Lokomotiva)
33	DF	SWE	Pierre Bengtsson (on loan from Copenhagen)

Out: Note: Flags indicate national team as defined under FIFA eligibility rules; some limited exceptions apply. Players may hold more than one non-FIFA nationality.

No.	Pos.	Nation	Player
24	DF	SWE	Alexander Milošević (released)
-	DF	DEN	Malte Amundsen (to (United States) New York City)
-	MF	FIN	Joel Mattsson (on loan to (Finland) HIFK)
-	FW	DEN	Leonel Montano (on loan to Fredericia)
-	FW	BRA	Vitinho (released)
