= Tochi Chukwuani =

Danish footballer (born 2003)

Personal information
- Full name: Tochi Phil Chukwuani
- Date of birth: 24 March 2003 (age 23)
- Place of birth: Herlev, Denmark
- Height: 1.87 m (6 ft 2 in)
- Position: Defensive midfielder

Team information
- Current team: Rangers
- Number: 42

Youth career
- B1973 Herlev
- B.93
- Nordsjælland

Senior career*
Years	Team	Apps	(Gls)
2019–2022	Nordsjælland	33	(3)
2022–2024	Lyngby	54	(5)
2024–2026	Sturm Graz	43	(4)
2026–	Rangers	10	(2)

International career^{‡}
2018–2019	Denmark U16	6	(2)
2019–2020	Denmark U17	15	(0)
2020–2021	Denmark U19	7	(3)
2021	Denmark U20	1	(0)
2023–2025	Denmark U21	20	(2)
- * Club domestic league appearances and goals as of 12 April 2026 ‡ National team caps and goals as of 22 June 2025

Tochi Phil Chukwuani (born 24 March 2003) is a Danish professional footballer who plays as a defensive midfielder for Scottish Premiership club Rangers.

== Club career ==
=== Nordsjælland ===
Born in Herlev to Igbo Nigerian parents, Chukwuani started playing football in the youth at B1973 Herlev and later B.93 before moving to the youth academy of Superliga club FC Nordsjælland. He practiced with the first team at age 14, and head coach Flemming Pedersen stated that he was "one of the top players of the future". In July 2019, Chukwuani signed a three-year contract, keeping him in Nordsjælland until 2022.

On 22 September 2019, Chukwuani made his professional debut in the Superliga in a 2–1 home win over AaB, thereby becoming the sixth youngest player to appear in a game in the league. He came on as a substitute in the 82nd minute for Magnus Kofod Andersen. On 17 July 2020, Chukwuani scored his first senior goal in a 6–3 away loss to eventual champions Midtjylland. With the goal, he became the club's youngest scorer in league history, a record that was broken the following season by teammate Andreas Schjelderup at 16 years and 284 days. He finished the season with 9 total appearances his which he scored one goal.

On 5 April 2022, it was reported that Chukwuani had signed with Italian Serie A club Hellas Verona. Among others, the well-known transfer journalist Fabrizio Romano posted a picture of Chukwuani back in April, wearing a Verona jersey. However, according to an Italian newspaper on 14 July 2022, Chukwuani failed the medical check in Verona because the medical staff had found a minor heart defect and as there were strict rules in Italy regarding heart problems, the transfer was no longer possible.

=== Lyngby ===
After training with Lyngby Boldklub for several weeks, the club confirmed on 31 August 2022, that Chukwuani had signed a two-year deal with the newly promoted Danish Superliga team. He made his debut for the club on 4 September, starting in a 2–0 home loss to Randers. On 7 May 2023, he scored his first goal for De Kongeblå, opening the score in the second minute of a 2–1 league victory against Midtjylland.

=== Sturm Graz ===
On 20 March 2024, it was announced that Chukwuani would be joining Austrian club Sturm Graz from the summer.

=== Rangers ===
On 11 January 2026, Chukwuani was announced by Rangers on an initial three-and-a-half-year deal.

== International career ==
He is a youth international for Denmark.

== Career statistics ==
=== Club ===
As of match played 20 August 2026

Appearances and goals by club, season and competition
Club	Season	League			National cup (Note: Includes Danish Cup, Austrian Cup, Scottish Cup)		League cup (Note: Includes Scottish League Cup)		Europe		Total	
Club	Season	Division	Apps	Goals	Apps	Goals	Apps	Goals	Apps	Goals	Apps	Goals
Nordsjælland	2019–20	Danish Superliga	7	1	2	0	—		—		9	1
Nordsjælland	2020–21	Danish Superliga	26	2	1	0	—		—		27	2
Nordsjælland	2021–22	Danish Superliga	0	0	0	0	—		—		0	0
Nordsjælland	Total		33	3	3	0	—		—		36	3
Lyngby	2022–23	Danish Superliga	23	1	—		—		—		23	1
Lyngby	2023–24	Danish Superliga	31	4	4	0	—		—		18	2
Lyngby	Total		54	5	4	0	—		—		41	3
Sturm Graz	2024–25	Austrian Bundesliga	27	3	2	0	—		7 (Note: Appearances in UEFA Champions League)	0	36	3
Sturm Graz	2025–26	Austrian Bundesliga	16	1	3	0	—		7 (Note: Two appearances in UEFA Champions League, five appearances in UEFA Europa League)	0	26	1
Sturm Graz	Total		43	4	5	0	—		14	0	62	4
Rangers	2025–26	Scottish Premiership	15	2	3	1	—		—		18	3
Rangers	2026–27	Scottish Premiership	0	0	0	0	1	0	2 (Note: One appearance in UEFA Europa League, one appearance in UEFA Conference League)	0	3	0
Rangers	Total		15	2	3	1	1	0	2	0	21	3
Career total			130	12	13	1	1	0	16	0	160	13

== Honours ==
Sturm Graz

- Austrian Bundesliga: 2024–25
