= Johan Meyer (footballer) =

Danish footballer (born 2004)

Personal information
- Date of birth: 5 January 2004 (age 22)
- Place of birth: Hillerød, Denmark
- Height: 1.92 m (6 ft 4 in)
- Position: Centre-back

Team information
- Current team: Start
- Number: 4

Youth career
- 2008–2017: Hillerød
- 2017–2023: Nordsjælland
- 2023–2024: Lyngby

Senior career*
Years	Team	Apps	(Gls)
2023–2026	Lyngby	15	(0)
2024–2025	→ Esbjerg fB (loan)	26	(0)
2026–	Start	1	(0)

International career
2022	Denmark U-18	2	(0)
2023	Denmark U-19	1	(0)
- * Club domestic league appearances and goals as of 22 August 2026

Johan Meyer (born 5 January 2004) is a Danish footballer who plays as a centre-back for Eliteserien club IK Start.

== Career ==
Born and raised in Hillerød, Meyer took his first football steps in Hillerød Fodbold, where he started at the age of 4. In 2017, Meyer moved to FC Nordsjælland, where he joined the club's academy. Meyer played there until January 2023, where he - according to media reports - he turned down several offers from Italian clubs to move to Lyngby Boldklub on a contract until June 2023.

19-year-old Meyer spent the first six months with the club's U-19 team, but was also selected for a Danish Superliga match in May, where he had to stay on the bench for the entire match. On 20 June 2023, Meyer extended his contract with Lyngby until 2024 with an option to extend, and he was also permanently promoted to the first team squad.

On 6 August 2023, Meyer made his official debut for Lyngby, coming on for the final few minutes of the 4–1 win over FC Midtjylland in the Danish Superliga.

On August 1, 2024, in search of more playing time, Meyer was loaned out to newly promoted Danish 1st Division club Esbjerg fB for the entire 2024–25 season. He left the club at the end of the loan spell.

On 21 January 2026, Meyer joined newly promoted Eliteserien club IK Start, signing a three-year deal.
