= Jonathan Amon =

American soccer player (born 1999)

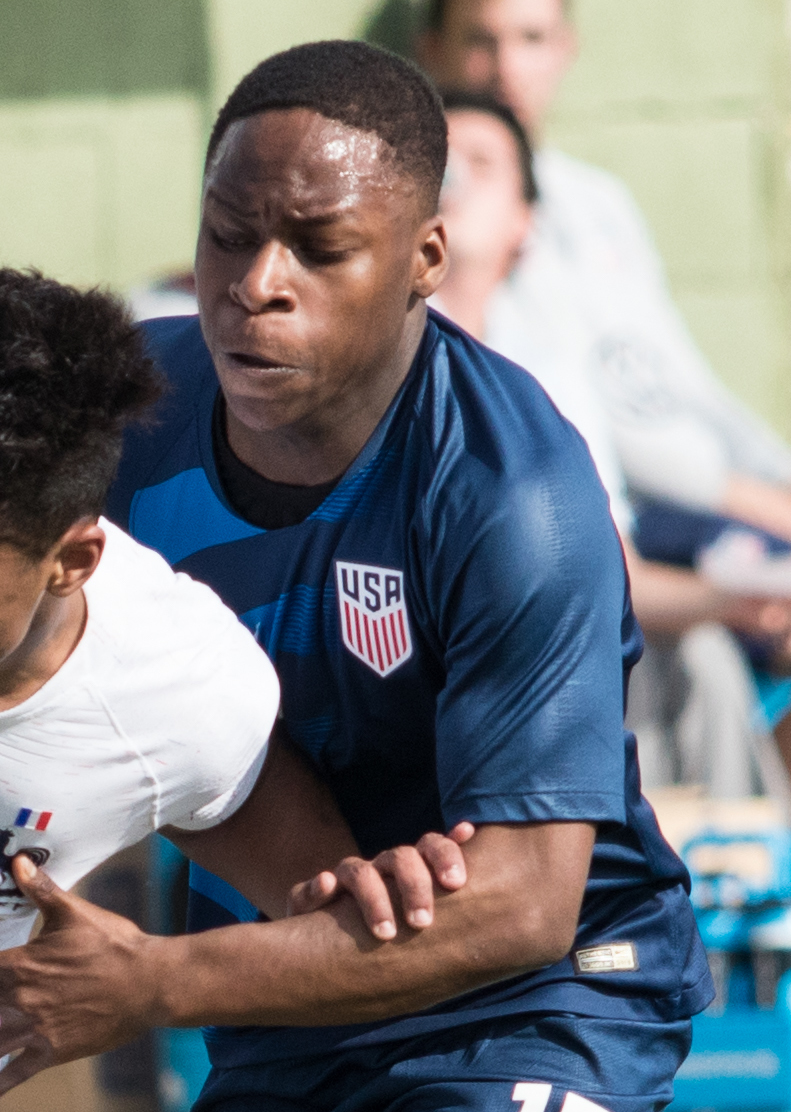
- Amon playing for the United States U20 against France U20 on March 22, 2019

Personal information
- Full name: Jonathan Oluwadara Amon
- Date of birth: April 30, 1999 (age 27)
- Place of birth: Summerville, South Carolina, United States
- Height: 5 ft 8 in (1.73 m)
- Position: Left winger

Team information
- Current team: SKN St. Pölten
- Number: 8

Youth career
- South Carolina Battery Academy
- 2014–2017: Nordsjælland

Senior career*
Years	Team	Apps	(Gls)
2017–2022	Nordsjælland	38	(7)
2023–2025	Lyngby	48	(3)
2025–2026	Vejle	10	(0)
2026–	SKN St. Pölten	6	(1)

International career
2019	United States U20	2	(0)
2018–2019	United States	2	(0)
- * Club domestic league appearances and goals as of September 19, 2026

Jonathan Oluwadara Amon (born April 30, 1999) is an American soccer player who plays as a left winger for 2. Liga club SKN St. Pölten.

== Youth career ==
Amon played three seasons with the U.S. Soccer Development Academy in Charleston, South Carolina, before getting selected to the U.S. Soccer U15 National Team Camp in 2014. Amon found his way to FC Nordsjaelland by virtue of a serendipitous chain of events that began with him being invited to attend a camp in Denmark at the invitation of scout Kenn Schmidt Nielsen of the Global Elite FC / Global Football School USA, Inc. While in Denmark, Scout Nielsen took him to tryouts at two clubs (Brøndby IF and FC Nordsjælland) and he grew to like the student and training environment at the KIES School, where the camp was held, and Scout Kenn helped him to enroll KIES. Soon after, Søren Krogh (teacher at Kies and assistant coach with FC Nordsjælland) offered Amon the opportunity to join FC Nordsjælland academy U17 team. In May 2017, Amon signed his first professional contract with FCN.

== Club career ==
Amon made his professional debut on November 4, 2017, in a tie against Lyngby. He replaced Ernest Asante at the game's 84th minute. On November 26, 2017, Amon started the match against AC Horsens. He played 80 minutes and scored his first goal as a professional player. In the 2018–2019 season, Amon had his strongest season, making 18 Superliga appearances and scoring 2 goals with 2 assists in 877 minutes.

During the 2019–2020 season, Amon suffered a fractured kneecap, which kept him out of play until October 2020. During his first game back, against Randers FC, Amon scored a goal, but after the game suffered more soreness in his knee. A scan two days later revealed that the knee had fractured a second time, leading to another 14-months out of the squad.

With zero official appearances since October 2020 due to injuries, Amon left Nordsjælland at the end of 2022.

On June 30, 2023, Amon signed a one-year contract with Danish Superliga club Lyngby Boldklub. On July 1, 2024, the day his contract expired, Amon signed a new contract with Lyngby until June 2026.

== International career ==
Amon was called up in January 2018 to the United States under-20 side for a training camp in Florida.

On November 4, 2018, Amon made his senior team debut with the national team in a friendly against Peru.

== Personal life ==
Amon's father is from Nigeria and emigrated to the United States at a young age to play soccer at the high school level. Amon has three brothers and one sister. His older brother, Joseph Amon, also played soccer and was named to the U.S. squad for the 2011 FIFA U-17 World Cup.

== Career statistics ==
As of match played April 11, 2025

Appearances and goals by club, season and competition
Club	Season	League			Danish Cup		Continental		Total	
Club	Season	Division	Apps	Goals	Apps	Goals	Apps	Goals	Apps	Goals
Nordsjælland	2017–18	Danish Superliga	10	2	0	0	—		10	2
Nordsjælland	2018–19	Danish Superliga	25	4	1	1	1 (Note: Appearance in UEFA Europa League)	1	27	6
Nordsjælland	2019–20	Danish Superliga	2	0	0	0	—		2	0
Nordsjælland	2020–21	Danish Superliga	1	1	1	0	—		2	1
Nordsjælland	Total		38	7	2	1	1	1	41	9
Lyngby	2023–24	Danish Superliga	25	0	3	0	—		28	0
Lyngby	2024–25	Danish Superliga	21	3	1	1	—		22	4
Lyngby	Total		46	3	4	1	—		50	4
Career total			84	10	6	2	1	1	91	13
