= Jeffrey Papa =

Danish footballer (born 2004)

Personal information
- Full name: Jeffrey Adjei-Broni
- Date of birth: 15 April 2004 (age 22)
- Place of birth: Rødovre, Danmark
- Position: Forward

Team information
- Current team: B.93
- Number: 11

Youth career
- Copenhagen
- Lyngby

Senior career*
Years	Team	Apps	(Gls)
2023–2025	Hvidovre	54	(3)
2025–2026	Kolding	17	(0)
2026–	B.93	4	(1)

International career^{‡}
2024	Denmark U20	1	(0)
- * Club domestic league appearances and goals as of 3 October 2026 ‡ National team caps and goals as of 26 March 2024

Jeffrey Adjei-Broni (born 15 April 2004), also known by his nickname, Jeffrey Papa, is a Danish footballer who plays as a forward for Danish 2nd Division club B.93.

== Career ==
Papa is a product of F.C. Copenhagen's youth academy, which he played for many years. In the summer of 2022, he made the move to Lyngby Boldklub, where he became part of the club's U-19 squad. After a very good season in Lyngby, where he scored 19 goals and 4 assists in 22 games, and a first place in the U-19 cup tournament, Papa left the club at the end of the season.

On 28 June 2023, it was confirmed that Papa had signed with newly promoted Danish Superliga club Hvidovre IF, putting his signature on a 3-year deal. Papa made his debut for Hvidovre, and in the top Danish league, on 21 July 2023, in a match against FC Midtjylland. In the first 17 games of the first half of the season, Papa played just 168 minutes in the league over 9 games and 224 minutes in the cup over 3 games, scoring one goal.

On transfer deadline day, September 1, 2025, Papa joined Danish 1st Division club Kolding IF on a deal until June 2028.

On transfer deadline the next year, Papa joined newly-relegated Danish 2nd Division side B.93 on three-year contract.

== Private life ==
Papa was born in Denmark, but has Ghanaian parents.
