= Emeka Nnamani (footballer) =

Danish footballer (born 2001)

Personal information
- Full name: Chukwuemeka Paul Nnamani
- Date of birth: 4 November 2001 (age 25)
- Place of birth: Rødovre, Denmark
- Position: Right winger

Team information
- Current team: Kalmar FF
- Number: 70

Youth career
- –2012: Islev BK
- 2012–2020: Nordsjælland

Senior career*
Years	Team	Apps	(Gls)
2020–2022	Nordsjælland	10	(0)
2022	→ Nykøbing (loan)	13	(1)
2022–2024	Nykøbing	40	(14)
2024–2025	B.93	30	(7)
2025–	Kalmar FF	18	(0)

International career
2018	Denmark U18	2	(0)
2020	Denmark U19	1	(0)
- * Club domestic league appearances and goals as of 8 July 2026

Chukwuemeka Paul "Emeka" Nnamani (born 4 November 2001) is a Danish professional footballer who plays for Allsvenskan club Kalmar FF.

== Club career ==
=== Nordsjælland ===
Nnamani was born in Rødovre, and joined the Nordsjælland academy at U11 level. He attended Bagsværd Kostskole og Gymnasium during his time at the academy where he graduated in 2020. He finished as the top goalscorer in the 2019–20 U19 League with 14 goals.

He made his Danish Superliga debut for Nordsjælland on 22 November 2020 in a game against AaB.

=== Nykøbing ===
On 1 February 2022, Nnamani joined 1st Division club Nykøbing on loan for the rest of the season. He made his competitive debut for the club on 25 February in a 2–0 loss away against Helsingør. Nnamani scored his first professional goal on 18 March in a 4–1 home loss to AC Horsens after coming on at half-time in a man of the match performance.

On 15 May 2022 Nykøbing confirmed, that Nnamani had signed a permanent deal with the club, until June 2025. On 1 February 2024, Nnamani moved to Danish 1st Division side B.93, signing a deal until June 2026.

=== Kalmar FF ===
After a season at Danish 1st Division side B.93, it was confirmed on 16 August 2025, that Nnamani had joined Superettan club Kalmar FF on a three-year deal.
