= Magnus Kofod Andersen =

Danish footballer (born 1999)

Personal information
- Date of birth: 10 May 1999 (age 27)
- Place of birth: Hundested, Denmark
- Height: 1.76 m (5 ft 9 in)
- Position: Midfielder

Team information
- Current team: Sparta Prague
- Number: 8

Youth career
- –2009: Hundested IK
- 2009–2018: Nordsjælland

Senior career*
Years	Team	Apps	(Gls)
2017–2022	Nordsjælland	163	(6)
2022–2025	Venezia	61	(1)
2025–	Sparta Prague	13	(1)

International career
2017	Denmark U18	2	(0)
2017–2018	Denmark U19	6	(0)
2018–2021	Denmark U21	25	(0)
- * Club domestic league appearances and goals as of 4 February 2026

Magnus Kofod Andersen (born 10 May 1999) is a Danish professional footballer who plays as a midfielder for Czech First League club Sparta Prague.

== Club career ==
Kofod started playing football at a local club called Hundested IK. Later, he got contacted by scouts from FC Nordsjælland, and joined the club at the age of 10.

Kofod's first senior experience was on 17 February 2017, where he sat on the bench for the whole game against Lyngby Boldklub. He got his debut for FC Nordsjælland on 17 July 2017. Kofod started on the bench, but replaced Mathias Jensen in the 74th minute in a 2–1 victory against OB in the Danish Superliga. Kofod plays with shirt number 38 for the senior team. Despite his young age, Kofod was nominated as the MOTM by Arbejdernes Landsbank after a victory against F.C. Copenhagen.

After 171 appearances for Nordsjælland, it was confirmed on 14 May 2022, that Kofod would leave the club at the end of the season, when his contract expired. On 26 May 2022, Kofod signed a three-year deal with an option for a fourth year, with newly relegated Italian Serie B-club Venezia.

On 12 January 2025, Kofod signed a multi-year contract with Czech First League club Sparta Prague.

== International career ==
In November 2020 he was called up to Kasper Hjulmand's senior squad for the friendly against Sweden due to several cancellations from, among others, the Danish national team players playing in England, due to the COVID-19 restrictions, as well as a case of COVID-19 in the squad, which had put several national team players in quarantine.

== Career statistics ==
As of match played on 1 March 2025

Club statistics
Club	Season	League			National Cup		Continental		Other		Total	
Club	Season	Division	Apps	Goals	Apps	Goals	Apps	Goals	Apps	Goals	Apps	Goals
Nordsjælland	2017–18	Danish Superliga	33	0	0	0	—		—		33	0
Nordsjælland	2018–19	Danish Superliga	31	0	1	0	4 (Note: Appearances in the UEFA Europa League)	1	—		36	1
Nordsjælland	2019–20	Danish Superliga	36	1	1	0	—		—		37	1
Nordsjælland	2020–21	Danish Superliga	32	4	0	0	—		—		32	4
Nordsjælland	2021–22	Danish Superliga	31	1	2	0	—		—		33	1
Nordsjælland	Total		163	6	4	0	4	1	0	0	171	7
Venezia	2022–23	Serie B	26	0	0	0	—		1 (Note: Appearance in the 2022–23 Serie B Promotion play-offs)	0	27	0
Venezia	2023–24	Serie B	19	0	1	0	—		—		20	0
Venezia	2024–25	Serie A	11	1	1	0	—		—		12	1
Venezia	Total		56	1	2	0	0	0	1	0	59	1
Sparta Prague	2024–25	Czech First League	5	0	1	0	—		—		6	0
Sparta Prague	Total		5	0	1	0	0	0	0	0	6	0
Career totals			224	7	7	0	4	1	1	0	236	8
