= Martin Huldahl =

Danish footballer (born 2004)

Personal information
- Full name: Martin Staghøj Huldahl
- Date of birth: 20 September 2004 (age 22)
- Place of birth: Holstebro, Denmark
- Position: Forward

Team information
- Current team: Hobro
- Number: 22

Youth career
- Midtjylland
- Holstebro
- Viborg

Senior career*
Years	Team	Apps	(Gls)
2022–2023	Viborg	1	(0)
2023	→ Skive (loan)	14	(1)
2023–2025	Skive	45	(21)
2025–2026	Fredericia	12	(0)
2026–	Hobro	13	(4)
- * Club domestic league appearances and goals as of 2 June 2026

Martin Staghøj Huldahl (born 20 September 2004) is a Danish footballer, who plays as a forward for Danish 1st Division club Hobro IK.

== Club career ==
=== Viborg FF ===
In his youth, Huldahl played for FC Midtjylland, before moving to Holstebro Boldklub in his hometown and later at the age of 15 to Viborg FF. Starting his career as a full-back, Huldahl was later retrained as a striker. In January 2022, Huldahl - who at the time was the topscorer of the Danish U-19 league - signed a contract with Viborg until June 2024. Per March 2022, as a retrained striker, Huldahl had already scored more than 50 goals as an U17 and U19 player in just a season and a half.

On 1 April 2022, 17-year old Huldahl got his official debut for Viborg FF, as he came on from the bench with 10 minutes left against SønderjyskE in the Danish Superliga. In the first half of the 2022–23 season, Huldahl scored 13 goals in 14 games for Viborg's U-19 squad. But on 30 January 2023, to gain some experience, Huldahl was loaned out to Danish 2nd Division club Skive IK. As he returned to Viborg at the end of the season, the club announced on 5 July 2023, that Huldahl's contract had been terminated by mutual consent.

=== Skive IK ===
On 6 July 2023, Huldahl returned to Danish 2nd Division club Skive IK, signing a one-year deal.

20-year-old Huldahl had a great start to the 2024–25 season, where he scored 7 goals after 8 games and was the league's top scorer in the 2024-25 Danish 2nd Division after the 8th round of play.

=== FC Fredericia ===
On January 31, it was confirmed that Huldahl moved to Danish 1st Division club FC Fredericia. According to rumors, Huldahl had already made a preliminary agreement with Fredericia before the announcement of the switch, valid from summer 2026, when his contract with Skive IK expired, but the parties agreed on an immediate transfer instead.

=== Hobro IK ===
On 2 February 2026, Danish 1st Division club Hobro IK signed Huldahl on a deal until the end of 2028.
