= Flemming Pedersen (football manager) =

Danish football manager (born 1963)

Personal information
- Full name: Flemming Steen Pedersen
- Date of birth: 6 June 1963 (age 63)
- Place of birth: Plejelt, Denmark

Team information
- Current team: Right to Dream (technical director)

Senior career*
Years	Team	Apps	(Gls)
- Tikøb IF
1980–1981	Helsingør		

Managerial career
- 1982–1985: Espergærde (youth)
- 1986–1988: Helsinge (youth)
- 1989–1990: Helsingør (youth)
- 1991: Sisimiut
- 1991–1993: Helsingør (youth)
- 1993–1996: Helsingør
- 1996–1998: Humlebæk
- 1998–2001: Copenhagen (reserves)
- 2001–2006: Helsingør
- 2006–2011: Nordsjælland (youth)
- 2011–2014: Nordsjælland (assistant)
- 2014–2015: Mainz 05 (assistant)
- 2016: Brentford B
- 2017–2019: Nordsjælland (technical director)
- 2019–2023: Nordsjælland
- 2023–: Right to Dream (technical director)
- * Club domestic league appearances and goals

Flemming Steen Pedersen (born 30 June 1963) is a Danish football manager who works as technical director of Danish Superliga club Nordsjælland and their Right to Dream Academy.

Pedersen was the manager of various clubs in Northern Zealand before joining Nordsjælland as youth coach in 2006. He later became Kasper Hjulmand's assistant in Nordsjælland and Mainz 05 and had a brief spell at Brentford in a backroom role and as B team head coach, before returning to Nordsjælland as technical director. In February 2019, it was announced that he would succeed Hjulmand as manager of Nordsjælland in the summer, but when Hjulmand left the club in March 2019, Pedersen was named manager immediately.

On 7 January 2023, Nordsjælland confirmed that Pedersen had decided to step down from his head coach position, despite Nordsjælland being in first place in the Danish Superliga. However, Pedersen would continue as part of Nordsjælland's coaching staff for the remainder of the season, in addition to being the technical director of the Right to Dream Academy.

== Managerial statistics ==
As of 13 November 2022

Managerial record by team and tenure
Team	From	To	Record							
Team	From	To	G	W	D	L	GF	GA	GD	Win %
Brentford B	1 July 2016	17 November 2016	0	0	0	0	0	0	+0	—
Nordsjælland	25 March 2019	7 January 2023	136	49	40	47	206	192	+14	36.03
Career total			136	49	40	47	206	192	+14	36.03
