= Bagsværd Kostskole og Gymnasium =

Coordinates: 55.7645°N 12.4514°E

- Bagsværd

Information
- Type: Primary school, gymnasium
- Established: 1908
- Staff: ~150
- Enrollment: 800 / 650+150
- Website: http://www.bagkost.dk

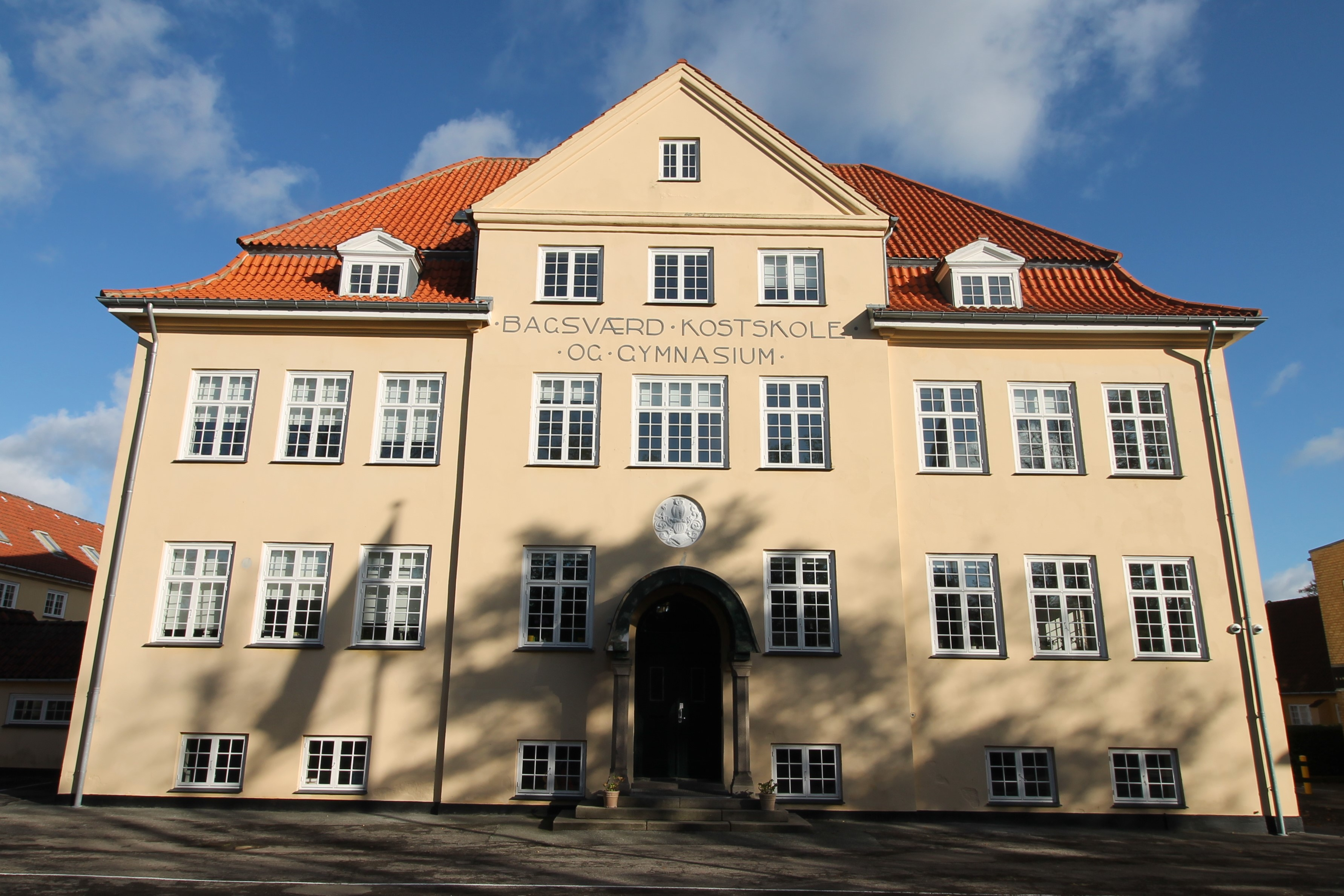
Bagsværd Kostskole, Aldershvilevej 138

Bagsværd Kostskole og Gymnasium (Eng: 'Bagsværd Boarding School and Gymnasium'), usually referred to among students, teachers etc. as simply BK, is a private day school, gymnasium, and boarding school situated in Bagsværd, a suburb of Copenhagen. The vast majority of the 800 pupils and students at BK commute to school every day; the boarding school (Haraldsgave, lit. "Harald's Gift", commonly known as Haga) only houses up to 60 students.

== History ==
The boarding school was established in 1908 on the site of the current day school, in the then rather rural area surrounding Bagsværd Sø; it was only later that this part of Northern Zealand was urbanized. The boarding school itself, located right next to Bagsværd Lake, was acquired in 1949 and has since been expanded, both through the construction of new buildings and the appropriation of neighbouring lots.

== Education ==
- Primary school: Up until the 7th grade, the primary school is divided into two lines, A and B. Due to an admittance of extra pupils at this point in the primary school, two new lines are established, whereupon all four lines are referred to as V, X, Y and Z, respectively. Earlier, the two new lines were dubbed C and D, and pupils were divided into these according to their choice of secondary foreign language - C was for those pupils who chose French, and D for those who chose German.
- Gymnasium: BK offers students four different branches of tuition, in accordance with the 2005 Educational Reform. These are divided into three main areas:
  - Mathematical/scientific:
    - Science: Mathematics A, physics B, chemistry B
    - Bio-tech: Biotechnology A, mathematics A, chemistry B
    - Digital: Programming B, communication/IT A
  - Linguistic/humanities:
    - Language and culture: English A, German/French/Spanish A, psychology C
  - Sociological:
    - Society and economics: Social sciences A, mathematics B, geography B

A, B, and C signify the level of difficulty of any given class, with A signifying an advanced level of education and C being an average difficulty suitable for a likewise average level of understanding.
