= Joachim Rothmann =

Danish footballer (born 2000)

Personal information
- Full name: Joachim Juhl Rothmann
- Date of birth: 29 June 2000 (age 26)
- Place of birth: Roskilde, Denmark
- Position: Forward

Youth career
- KFUM Roskilde
- Greve Fodbold
- 2012–2018: Nordsjælland

Senior career*
Years	Team	Apps	(Gls)
2018–2022	Nordsjælland	27	(0)
2021	→ Tromsø (loan)	7	(0)
2021–2022	→ HB Køge (loan)	24	(4)
2022–2025	HB Køge	45	(11)
2025	Kolding	2	(0)

International career
2016	Denmark U16	3	(0)
2016	Denmark U17	9	(1)
- * Club domestic league appearances and goals as of 17:37, 13 April 2025 (UTC)

Joachim Juhl Rothmann (born 29 June 2000) is a retired Danish professional footballer who played as a forward.

== Club career ==
=== FC Nordsjælland ===
Rothmann began his youth career at local club KFUM Roskilde, before moving to Greve Fodbold. Later, at the age of 12, Rothmann moved to FC Nordsjælland.

Rothmann's first senior experience was on 25 November 2018, when he was on the bench for the whole game against OB in the Danish Superliga. He got his official debut for FC Nordsjælland on 5 December 2018. Rothmann started on the bench, but replaced Mads Valentin in the 55th minute in a 0–1 defeat against Vendsyssel FF in the Danish Cup. He got his debut in the Danish Superliga five days later against AGF, where he played 17 minutes in a 1–0 victory. On 9 January 2019, Rothmann signed his first professional contract and would be permanently promoted to the first team squad ahead of the 2019–20 season.

On 12 May 2021 Nordsjælland confirmed, that Rothmann had signed a new deal until June 2022 and immediately would be loaned out to Norwegian Eliteserien club Tromsø IL for the rest of 2021. However, after a disappointing time at Tromsø, the loan spell was cut short, after Nordsjælland decided to recall him on 10 August 2021. At Tromsø, Rothmann only managed to play 98 minutes, spread over seven games.

On 29 August 2021, one year before his contract with Nordsjælland expired, Rothmann was once again sent out on loan, this time to Danish 1st Division club HB Køge for the rest of the season. The following day, he scored on his debut for Køge against Vendsyssel FF.

=== Permanent move to Køge ===
After a season on loan at Køge, scoring 4 goals in 24 matches, Rothmann completed a permanent move to HB Køge on 16 June 2022, signing a three-year deal with the club.

After an injury-plagued year for Rothmann, HB Køge confirmed on 7 January 2025 that the parties had agreed to terminate the striker's contract with immediate effect, six months before contract expiration.

In early January 2025, newly promoted Allsvenskan club Degerfors IF confirmed that Rothmann would be on trial for the next two weeks.

=== Kolding IF ===
On February 28, 2025, it was confirmed that Rothmann had signed a contract with the Danish 1st Division side Kolding IF.

On 16 May 2025 Kolding IF confirmed, that 24-year old Rothmann would retire at the end of the season due to a hip injury that had bothered him for an extended period.
