= 2024–25 Silkeborg IF season =

Danish football club season

Silkeborg
2024–25 season
- Owner: Trivela Group
- Chairman: Kent Madsen
- Manager: Kent Nielsen
- Stadium: JYSK Park
- Danish Superliga: 7th
- Danish Cup: Runners-up
- UEFA Europa League: Second qualifying round
- UEFA Conference League: Third qualifying round
- Top goalscorer: League: Tonni Adamsen (15); All: Tonni Adamsen (23)
- Highest home attendance: 8,881 v Brøndby (7 May 2025, Danish Cup)
- Lowest home attendance: 3,448 v Sønderjyske (11 May 2025, Superliga)
- Average home league attendance: 5,156
- Biggest win: 6–0 v Holbæk B&I (29 October 2024, Danish Cup)
- Biggest defeat: 0–3 v Copenhagen (29 May 2025, Danish Cup)
Home colours	Away colours

The 2024–25 season was the 108th season in the history of Silkeborg Idrætsforening and the club's fourth consecutive season in the top flight of Danish football. In addition to the domestic league, the team participated in the Danish Cup, as well as the UEFA Europa League qualifying phase and the UEFA Conference League qualifying phase.

Silkeborg ended the Danish Superliga regular season in seventh place, which meant that they would have to play the rest of their matches in the relegation round. They topped the relegation round table, earning a face-off against Randers for a place in the 2025–26 Conference League second qualifying round, which Silkeborg won 3–1. The club's campaign in the Danish Cup ended in defeat after a 3–0 result in the final against Copenhagen.

== Squad ==
Note: Flags indicate national team as defined under FIFA eligibility rules; some limited exceptions apply. Players may hold more than one non-FIFA nationality.

No.	Pos.	Nation	Player
1	GK	DEN	Nicolai Larsen (captain)
2	DF	DEN	Andreas Poulsen
3	DF	NOR	Robin Østrøm
4	DF	POR	Pedro Ganchas
6	MF	DEN	Pelle Mattsson
7	MF	KAZ	Ramazan Orazov
8	MF	DEN	Jeppe Andersen
9	FW	DEN	Alexander Simmelhack
10	FW	DEN	Younes Bakiz
11	MF	DEN	Fredrik Carlsen
14	MF	DEN	Sofus Berger

No.	Pos.	Nation	Player
17	FW	NZL	Callum McCowatt
19	DF	DEN	Jens Martin Gammelby
20	MF	DEN	Mads Larsen
21	MF	DEN	Anders Klynge
23	FW	DEN	Tonni Adamsen
24	DF	DEN	Alexander Madsen
25	DF	SWE	Pontus Rödin
30	GK	DEN	Aske Andrésen
33	MF	DEN	Mads Freundlich
40	DF	DEN	Alexander Busch
41	MF	DEN	Oskar Boesen

=== Youth players in use ===
Note: Flags indicate national team as defined under FIFA eligibility rules; some limited exceptions apply. Players may hold more than one non-FIFA nationality.

No.	Pos.	Nation	Player
26	MF	DEN	Mikkel Øxenberg
27	DF	DEN	Sebastian Laustsen

No.	Pos.	Nation	Player
35	FW	DEN	Sebastian Biller
36	MF	DEN	Julius Nielsen

=== Out on loan ===
Note: Flags indicate national team as defined under FIFA eligibility rules; some limited exceptions apply. Players may hold more than one non-FIFA nationality.

No. / Pos. / Nation / Player; 13 / DF / DEN / Oscar Fuglsang (at Fredericia until 30 June 2025)	No. / Pos. / Nation / Player; 15 / FW / DEN / Asbjørn Bøndergaard (at Fredericia until 30 June 2025)

== Transfers ==
=== In ===
Pos.	Player	Transferred from	Fee	Date	Source
FW	(Denmark) Frederik Carstensen	(Denmark) Fredericia	Loan return	30 June 2024	
MF	(Denmark) Andreas Pyndt	(Sweden) IFK Göteborg	Loan return	30 June 2024	
DF	(Denmark) Andreas Poulsen	(Denmark) AaB	Undisclosed	1 July 2024	
MF	(Kazakhstan) Ramazan Orazov	(Kazakhstan) Aktobe	Free	1 July 2024	
FW	(Denmark) Younes Bakiz	(Denmark) AaB	€400,000	1 July 2024	
DF	(Portugal) Pedro Ganchas	(Portugal) Paços de Ferreira	€400,000	2 July 2024	
MF	(Denmark) Mads Freundlich	(Denmark) Hobro	€535,000	16 July 2024	
MF	(Denmark) Jeppe Andersen	(Norway) Sarpsborg 08	Undisclosed	18 July 2024	
FW	(Denmark) Alexander Simmelhack	(Denmark) Copenhagen	Undisclosed	21 August 2024	
DF	(Denmark) Rasmus Thelander	(Denmark) AaB	Free	1 September 2024	
MF	(Denmark) Sofus Berger	(Denmark) Viborg	Undisclosed	1 February 2025	

=== Out ===
Pos.	Player	Transferred to	Fee	Date	Source
DF	(Zambia) Lubambo Musonda	(Denmark) Horsens	Loan return	30 June 2024	
DF	(Denmark) Andreas Poulsen	(Denmark) AaB	Loan return	30 June 2024	
DF	(Denmark) Frederik Rieper	(Denmark) Fredericia	End of contract	1 July 2024	
MF	(Denmark) Kasper Kusk	(Denmark) Vendsyssel	End of contract	1 July 2024	
DF	(Denmark) Joel Felix	(Germany) Arminia Bielefeld	End of contract	1 July 2024	
FW	(Denmark) Asbjørn Bøndergaard	(Denmark) Fredericia	Loan	1 July 2024	
DF	(Denmark) Oscar Fuglsang	(Denmark) Fredericia	Loan	1 July 2024	
MF	(Iceland) Stefán Teitur Þórðarson	(England) Preston North End	Undisclosed	9 July 2024	
FW	(Denmark) Frederik Carstensen	(Norway) Sarpsborg 08	Undisclosed	23 July 2024	
FW	(Denmark) Alexander Lind	(Italy) Pisa	€4,000,000	12 August 2024	
MF	(Denmark) Andreas Pyndt	(Sweden) Sirius	Undisclosed	19 August 2024	
GK	(Denmark) Jacob Pryts	(Norway) Start	Undisclosed	23 August 2024	
MF	(Denmark) Mark Brink	(Denmark) Nordsjælland	Undisclosed	2 September 2024	
DF	(Peru) Oliver Sonne	(England) Burnley	Undisclosed	1 January 2025	
DF	(Denmark) Anders Dahl	(Denmark) Fredericia	Undisclosed	13 January 2025	
DF	(Denmark) Rasmus Thelander	Released	N/A	31 December 2024	

== Pre-season and friendlies ==
The pre-season programme was revealed by the club on 13 June 2024.

The programme for the mid-season training camp in Spain was announced on 25 January 2025.

27 June 2024 Friendly	Copenhagen (Denmark)	1–0	(Denmark) Silkeborg	Frederiksberg
13:00 CEST	Chiakha 61'	Report		Stadium: Nummer 10; Referee: Simon Duerlund Rasmussen

30 June 2024 Friendly	Silkeborg (Denmark)	2–2	(Norway) Haugesund	Silkeborg
13:00 CEST	Þórðarson 8'; Lind 17'	Report	Krusnell 2'; Bærtelsen 74'	Stadium: JYSK Park

6 July 2024 Friendly	Utrecht (Netherlands)	2–2	(Denmark) Silkeborg	Utrecht, Netherlands
14:00 CEST	Descotte 46'; Okkels 48'	Report	Adamsen 31' (pen.), 53'	Stadium: Sportpark USV Elinkwijk

9 July 2024 Friendly	PEC Zwolle (Netherlands)	1–3	(Denmark) Silkeborg	Putten, Netherlands
14:00 CEST	Fontana 47'	Report	Lind 27'; Orazov 31' (pen.); Adamsen 32'	Stadium: Sportpark SDC PUTTEN

12 July 2024 Friendly	Silkeborg (Denmark)	1–4	(Denmark) Vendsyssel	Silkeborg
13:00 CEST	Andersen 78'	Report	Jensen 9'; Kusk 45+7'; Greve 55'; Steffensen 57'	Stadium: JYSK Park

10 October 2024 Friendly	Holstein Kiel (Germany)	5–0	(Denmark) Silkeborg	Kiel, Germany
13:00 CET	Freundlich 5' (o.g.); Pichler 20'; Bernhardsson 22'; Erras 44'; Arp 55'	Report		Stadium: Citti Fussball Park

22 January 2025 Friendly	Silkeborg (Denmark)	1–1	(Denmark) Brabrand	Silkeborg
19:00 CET				Stadium: JYSK Park

24 January 2025 Friendly	Silkeborg (Denmark)	2–2	(Denmark) OB	Silkeborg
13:00 CET	Bakiz 5'; Gammelby 44'	Report	Kjerrumgaard 14'; Ejdum 86'	Stadium: JYSK Park

29 January 2025 Friendly	Silkeborg (Denmark)	0–0	(Spain) Real Murcia	Murcia, Spain
11:00 CET		Report		Stadium: Pinatar Arena

1 February 2025 Friendly	Copenhagen (Denmark)	0–3	(Denmark) Silkeborg	Murcia, Spain
16:00 CET		Report	Larsson 43', 59'; Claesson 77'	Stadium: Pinatar Arena

5 February 2025 Friendly	Silkeborg (Denmark)	1–0	(Sweden) Sirius	Murcia, Spain
12:00 CET	McCowatt 63'	Report		Stadium: Pinatar Arena

8 February 2025 Friendly	Silkeborg (Denmark)	2–1	(Denmark) Hillerød	Silkeborg
13:00 CET	Andersen; McCowatt	Report	Etim	Stadium: JYSK Park

== Competitions ==
=== Overall record ===
Competition	First match	Last match	Starting round	Final position	Record							
Competition	First match	Last match	Starting round	Final position	Pld	W	D	L	GF	GA	GD	Win %
Superliga	21 July 2024	24 May 2025	Matchday 1	7th	32	13	10	9	56	41	+15	40.63
European play-off match	1 June 2025		Europa playoff	Winners	1	1	0	0	3	1	+2	100.00
Danish Cup	25 September 2024	29 May 2025	Third round	Runners-up	7	4	2	1	18	11	+7	57.14
UEFA Europa League	25 July 2024	1 August 2024	Second qualifying round	Second qualifying round	2	1	0	1	4	5	−1	50.00
UEFA Conference League	8 August 2024	15 August 2024	Third qualifying round	Third qualifying round	2	0	1	1	4	5	−1	0.00
Total					44	19	13	12	85	63	+22	43.18

Source: Soccerway

=== Superliga ===
==== League table ====
Pos	Team	Pld	W	D	L	GF	GA	GD	Pts	Qualification
5	Nordsjælland	22	10	5	7	39	36	+3	35	Qualification for the Championship round
6	Brøndby	22	8	9	5	42	32	+10	33	Qualification for the Championship round
7	Silkeborg	22	8	9	5	38	29	+9	33	Qualification for the Relegation round
8	Viborg	22	7	7	8	38	39	−1	28	Qualification for the Relegation round
9	AaB	22	5	6	11	23	41	−18	21	Qualification for the Relegation round

Source: Danish Football Association (in Danish), Soccerway
Rules for classification: 1) Points; 2) Goal difference; 3) Goals scored; 4) Away goals scored; 5) Play-off (played on neutral ground if determining teams for different rounds); 6) Draw.

==== Results summary ====
Overall								Home						Away					
Pld	W	D	L	GF	GA	GD	Pts	W	D	L	GF	GA	GD	W	D	L	GF	GA	GD
32	13	10	9	56	41	+15	49	7	5	4	26	19	+7	6	5	5	30	22	+8

Source: Soccerway

==== Results by round – regular season ====
Matchday	1	2	3	4	5	6	7	8	9	10	11	12	13	14	15	16	17	18	19	20	21	22
Ground	H	A	H	A	H	A	H	A	H	A	H	A	H	A	H	A	H	H	A	A	H	A
Result	W	L	W	W	W	W	L	D	D	D	D	D	D	D	W	L	D	L	W	W	L	D
Position	4	5	5	3	1	1	3	3	4	4	4	4	5	6	4	6	6	6	6	6	7	7
Points	3	3	6	9	12	15	15	16	17	18	19	20	21	22	25	25	26	26	29	32	32	33

Source: http://www.superliga.dk/
A = Away; H = Home; W = Win; D = Draw; L = Loss

==== Relegation round ====
Pos	Team	Pld	W	D	L	GF	GA	GD	Pts	
1	Silkeborg (O)	32	13	10	9	56	41	+15	49	Qualification for the European play-off match
2	Viborg	32	12	11	9	57	50	+7	47	
3	Sønderjyske	32	10	7	15	47	64	−17	37	
4	Vejle	32	7	7	18	37	64	−27	28	
5	Lyngby (R)	32	5	12	15	26	43	−17	27	Relegation to 1st Division

Source: Danish Football Association (in Danish), Soccerway
Rules for classification: 1) Points; 2) Goal difference; 3) Goals scored; 4) Away goals scored; 5) Play-off (played on neutral ground if determining teams for different rounds); 6) Draw.
(O) Play-off winners; (R) Relegated

==== Results by round - Relegation round ====
Matchday	1	2	3	4	5	6	7	8	9	10
Ground	A	H	A	H	A	A	H	H	A	H
Result	L	W	L	W	W	L	D	W	W	L
Position	1	1	2	1	1	1	1	1	1	1
Points	33	36	36	39	42	42	43	46	49	49

Source: http://www.superliga.dk/
A = Away; H = Home; W = Win; D = Draw; L = Loss

==== Regular season ====
The matches were released on 7 June 2024.

21 July 2024 1	Silkeborg	1–0	Sønderjyske	Silkeborg
14:00 CEST	Mattsson 77'	Report	Gallegos (yellow card) 84'	Stadium: JYSK Park; Attendance: 4,394; Referee: Mads-Kristoffer Kristoffersen

28 July 2024 2	AaB	2–1	Silkeborg	Aalborg
16:00 CEST	Jørgensen 18'; Højholt 52'; Jasson (yellow card) 90+1'	Report	Sonne 90'; Brink (red card) 90+4'; Sonne (yellow card) 90+6'	Stadium: Aalborg Stadium; Attendance: 9,439; Referee: Jakob Kehlet

4 August 2024 3	Silkeborg	3–2	Viborg	Silkeborg
14:00 CEST	Pyndt 9'; Bakiz 12', (yellow card) 59'; Adamsen (yellow card) 35'; Rödin 40'	Report	Anyembe 47'; Grønning 52' (pen.); Westergaard (yellow card) 90+5'	Stadium: JYSK Park; Attendance: 4,712; Referee: Aydin Uslu

11 August 2024 4	Randers	0–2	Silkeborg	Randers
14:00 CEST		Report	Ganchas (yellow card) 27'; Orazov 52'; Bakiz 66'; McCowatt (yellow card) 84'	Stadium: Cepheus Park Randers; Attendance: 4,558; Referee: Simon Duerlund Rasmussen

18 August 2024 5	Silkeborg	4–1	Nordsjælland	Silkeborg
14:00 CEST	Sonne 33'; Bakiz 35'; Adamsen 71' (pen.), 74'	Report	Nygren 31'; Hansen (yellow card) 59'	Stadium: JYSK Park; Attendance: 4,473; Referee: Mikkel Redder

25 August 2024 6	Vejle	1–3	Silkeborg	Vejle
14:00 CEST	Emmanouilidis (yellow card) 56'; Gammelgaard (yellow card) 88'; Barry 89'	Report	Adamsen 57', 73'; Poulsen (yellow card) 90+1'; Simmelhack 90+3'	Stadium: Vejle Stadium; Attendance: 7,363; Referee: Simon Duerlund Rasmussen

1 September 2024 7	Silkeborg	1–3	Midtjylland	Silkeborg
16:00 CEST	Adamsen 29'; Andersen (yellow card) 39'	Report	Osorio 4'; Djú 44'; Diao 77'	Stadium: JYSK Park; Attendance: 7,924; Referee: Sandi Putros

15 September 2024 8	AGF	1–1	Silkeborg	Aarhus
14:00 CEST	Poulsen 29', (yellow card) 63'; Madsen (yellow card) 72'; Arnstad (yellow card) 74'	Report	Adamsen 22'; Andersen (yellow card) 75'	Stadium: Ceres Park; Attendance: 15,627; Referee: Jacob Karlsen

22 September 2024 9	Silkeborg	3–3	Brøndby	Silkeborg
18:00 CEST	Andersen 13'; Adamsen 57', 73' (pen.)	Report	Suzuki 23'; Bischoff (yellow card) 54'; Wass 63'; Rajović 67'; Lauritsen (red card) 71'	Stadium: JYSK Park; Attendance: 7,239; Referee: Aydin Uslu

29 September 2024 10	Lyngby	2–2	Silkeborg	Lyngby
16:00 CEST	Winther 59'; Warming (yellow card) 84'; Opoku 90+4'	Report	Bakiz 28', (yellow card) 58'; Poulsen (yellow card) 61'; Carlsen 84'	Stadium: Lyngby Stadium; Attendance: 4,347; Referee: Sandi Putros

6 October 2024 11	Silkeborg	2–2	Copenhagen	Silkeborg
20:00 CEST	Bakiz 6', (yellow card) 70'; Andersen 28'; Freundlich (yellow card) 61'; Sonne (yellow card) 89'	Report	Mattsson (yellow card) 37'; Delaney (yellow card) 45+3'; Cornelius (yellow card) 59'; Claesson 71'; Pereira 85'; Diks (yellow card) 89'	Stadium: JYSK Park; Attendance: 5,468; Referee: Jakob Kehlet

20 October 2024 12	Nordsjælland	1–1	Silkeborg	Farum
16:00 CEST	Ankersen (yellow card) 54'; K. Hansen (yellow card) 56'; Sonne 75' (o.g.)	Report	Andersen 3'; Thelander (yellow card) 67'	Stadium: Right to Dream Park; Attendance: 4,752; Referee: Jakob Sundberg

25 October 2024 13	Silkeborg	1–1	AaB	Silkeborg
19:00 CEST	Pedro Ganchas 90+2'	Report	Iredale 8'; Jasson (yellow card) 27'; Ross (yellow card) 41'; Bruus (yellow card) 59'; Pudel (yellow card) 66'	Stadium: JYSK Park; Attendance: 5,123; Referee: Jens Maae

4 November 2024 14	Copenhagen	2–2	Silkeborg	Copenhagen
19:00 CET	Cornelius 2'; Diks 90+1'; Hatzidiakos (yellow card) 90+10'	Report	Adamsen 45+3' (pen.); Gammelby (yellow card) 90'; Freundlich (yellow card) 90+6'; Simmelhack 90+9'	Stadium: Parken Stadium; Attendance: 20,785; Referee: Jakob Kehlet

10 November 2024 15	Silkeborg	1–0	Randers	Silkeborg
14:00 CET	Ganchas (yellow card) 20'; Freundlich 72'; Adamsen (yellow card) 83'	Report	Bany (yellow card) 36'; Björkengren (yellow card) 51'	Stadium: JYSK Park; Attendance: 5,127; Referee: Jonas Hansen

25 November 2024 16	Midtjylland	1–0	Silkeborg	Herning
19:00 CET	Buksa 36'; Mbabu (yellow card) 69'; Andersson (yellow card) 90+5'	Report	Sonne (yellow card) 15'	Stadium: MCH Arena; Attendance: 8,703; Referee: Jakob Sundberg

1 December 2024 17	Silkeborg	1–1	AGF	Silkeborg
18:00 CET	Mattsson (yellow card) 23'; Sonne 73'; Freundlich (yellow card) 81'	Report	Mortensen 82' (pen.); Kahl (yellow card) 90+1'; Power (yellow card) 90+4'	Stadium: JYSK Park; Attendance: 6,859; Referee: Lasse Graagaard

16 February 2025 18	Silkeborg	0–1	Vejle	Silkeborg
14:00 CET	Gammelby (yellow card) 11'; Mattsson (yellow card) 76'	Report	Flø (yellow card) 39'; Onugkha 50'; Kirkegaard (yellow card) 70'	Stadium: JYSK Park; Attendance: 4,656; Referee: Jakob Kehlet

24 February 2025 19	Viborg	1–4	Silkeborg	Viborg
19:00 CET	Näsberg 5'; Ementa (yellow card) 70'	Report	M. Larsen 30'; Bakiz 37'; Andersson 83' (o.g.); McCowatt 86'	Stadium: Energi Viborg Arena; Attendance: 5,208; Referee: Michael Tykgaard

2 March 2025 20	Sønderjyske	1–3	Silkeborg	Haderslev
14:00 CET	Djantou (yellow card) 8'; Klysner 35'; Hoppe (yellow card) 72'	Report	Bakiz 16'; Klynge (yellow card) 28'; McCowatt 67'; Østrøm (yellow card) 87'; Orazov 90+7'	Stadium: Sydbank Park; Attendance: 4,032; Referee: Sandi Putros

9 March 2025 21	Silkeborg	0–1	Lyngby	Silkeborg
14:00 CET	Mattsson (yellow card) 39'; Andersen (yellow card) 74'; Bakiz (yellow card) 90+4'	Report	Thelander 31'; Magnússon (yellow card) 36'; Jensen (yellow card) 57'; Abubakari (yellow card) 80'; Lissens (yellow card) 90+4'; Amon (yellow card) 90+7'	Stadium: JYSK Park; Attendance: 5,310; Referee: Jonas Hansen

16 March 2025 22	Brøndby	2–2	Silkeborg	Brøndbyvester
17:00 CET	Klaiber (yellow card) 13'; Vallys 26'; Nartey (yellow card) 46'; Alves 77'; Wass (yellow card) 90+5'	Report	Adamsen 11'; Mattsson (yellow card) 17'; Gammelby 36'; Busch (yellow card) 44'	Stadium: Brøndby Stadium; Attendance: 24,056; Referee: Michael Tykgaard

==== Relegation round ====
The match schedule for the relegation round was revealed on 19 March 2025.

30 March 2025 23	Sønderjyske	2–1	Silkeborg	Haderslev
14:00 CEST	Sommer 5'; Agger 44'; Vinderslev (yellow card) 72'	Report	Bakiz 6'; Andersen (yellow card) 90'	Stadium: Sydbank Park; Attendance: 3,075; Referee: Mads-Kristoffer Kristoffersen

6 April 2025 24	Silkeborg	2–1	Lyngby	Silkeborg
14:00 CEST	Bakiz 8'; Adamsen 15' (pen.); Mattsson (yellow card) 59'	Report	Opoku (yellow card) 7', (goal) 30'; Klassen (yellow card) 40'; Jensen (yellow card) 44'; Magnússon (penalty missed) 51'; Langhoff (yellow card) 90+1'	Stadium: JYSK Park; Attendance: 3,744; Referee: Simon Duerlund Rasmussen

13 April 2025 25	Viborg	2–1	Silkeborg	Viborg
14:00 CEST	Grønning (yellow card) 7'; Jensen 74', 89'	Report	Rödin 25'	Stadium: Energi Viborg Arena; Attendance: 6,002; Referee: Mikkel Redder

16 April 2025 26	Silkeborg	4–0	Aab	Silkeborg
19:00 CEST	McCowatt 8', 14'; Adamsen 22'; Gammelby 33'; Mattsson (yellow card) 90'	Report		Stadium: JYSK Park; Attendance: 4,636; Referee: Aydin Uslu

21 April 2025 27	Vejle	0–4	Silkeborg	Vejle
14:00 CEST	Hetemi (yellow card) 80'	Report	McCowatt 17'; Klynge 51'; Bakiz 56'; Simmelhack 85'	Stadium: Vejle Stadium; Attendance: 7,331; Referee: Jacob Karlsen

27 April 2025 28	Lyngby	2–0	Silkeborg	Lyngby
14:00 CEST	Cornelius 19'; Magnússon 67'; Lissens (yellow card) 79'	Report		Stadium: Lyngby Stadium; Attendance: 5,243; Referee: Lasse Graagaard

4 May 2025 29	Silkeborg	1–1	Vejle	Silkeborg
14:00 CEST	Adamsen 9'	Report	Kirkegaard (yellow card) 21'; Emmanouilidis 35'	Stadium: JYSK Park; Attendance: 4,550; Referee: Jakob Sundberg

11 May 2025 30	Silkeborg	1–0	Sønderjyske	Silkeborg
14:00 CEST	Simmelhack 48'; Østrøm (yellow card) 55'	Report	Hyseni (yellow card) 41'	Stadium: JYSK Park; Attendance: 3,448; Referee: Sandi Putros

18 May 2025 31	Aab	2–3	Silkeborg	Aalborg
14:00 CEST	Østrøm 36' (o.g.); Helenius 61'; Hernes (yellow card) 87'; Jørgensen (yellow card) 90+2'	Report	Adamsen 45+5' (pen.), 90+5'; Mattsson (yellow card) 86'; Simmelhack 90'	Stadium: Aalborg Stadium; Attendance: 9,276; Referee: Mads-Kristoffer Kristoffersen

24 May 2025 32	Silkeborg	1–2	Viborg	Silkeborg
15:00 CEST	Carlsen 19'; Ganchas (yellow card) 29'	Report	Njoh 23'; Jensen 30' (pen.); Renato Júnior (yellow card) 54'; Søndergaard (yellow card) 56'; Näsberg (yellow card) 72'	Stadium: JYSK Park; Attendance: 4,838; Referee: Jorgen Burchardt

==== European play-off match ====
1 June 2025 Europa playoff	Randers	1–3	Silkeborg	Aarhus
18:30 CEST	Mahmoud 39'; Björkengren (yellow card) 44'; Greve (yellow card) 69'	Report	Mattsson 8'; McCowatt 26'; Busch (yellow card) 49'; Østrøm (yellow card) 62'; Andersen 71', (yellow card) 75'; Adamsen (penalty missed) 90+2'	Stadium: Ceres Park Vejlby; Attendance: 3,027; Referee: Jakob Sundberg

=== Danish Cup ===
Silkeborg entered the Danish Cup in the third round, and were drawn against Danish 1st Division side Roskilde.

25 September 2024 Third round	Roskilde	1–3	Silkeborg	Roskilde
18:30 CEST	Arabaci 45+1', (yellow card) 60'; Maarup (yellow card) 85'	Report	Ganchas 27'; Adamsen 62'; Mattsson (yellow card) 74'; Orazov 90+2'	Stadium: Roskilde Idrætspark; Attendance: 1,338; Referee: Jakob Sundberg

29 October 2024 Fourth round	Holbæk B&I	0–6	Silkeborg	Silkeborg
20:00 CET	Oseni (yellow card) 70'	Report	Bakiz 18'; McCowatt 34'; Mattsson 49'; M. Larsen 54'; Gammelby 58'	Stadium: JYSK Park; Attendance: 2,513; Referee: Mads-Kristoffer Kristoffersen

8 December 2024 Quarter-finals first leg	Silkeborg	2–2	AaB	Silkeborg
15:30 CET	Poulsen (yellow card) 68'; Mattsson (yellow card) 72'; Simmelhack 81'; Sonne 83'	Report	Jimenez (yellow card) 55'; Jørgensen 62'; Kramer 90+2'	Stadium: JYSK Park; Attendance: 3,477; Referee: Jens Maae

16 December 2024 Quarter-finals second leg	AaB	1–2 (3–4 agg.)	Silkeborg	Aalborg
19:00 CET	Jørgensen 1'; Pudel (yellow card) 24'; Adedeji (yellow card) 65'; Ross (yellow card) 86'; Müller (yellow card) 86'	Report	Bakiz 38' (pen.), 57', (yellow card) 86'; Orazov (yellow card) 77'; Larsen (yellow card) 88'; Mattsson (yellow card) 88'	Stadium: Aalborg Portland Park; Attendance: 7,026; Referee: Sandi Putros

30 April 2025 Semi-finals first leg	Brøndby	3–3	Silkeborg	Brøndbyvester
18:30 CEST	Divković 57'; Suzuki (yellow card) 63'; Kvistgaarden 81', 83'; Nartey (yellow card) 87'	Report	Poulsen 8'; Vanlerberghe 34' (o.g.); Adamsen 45+1'; Klynge (yellow card) 63'; Larsen (yellow card) 68'	Stadium: Brøndby Stadium; Referee: Mikkel Redder

7 May 2025 Semi-finals second leg	Silkeborg	2–1 (5–4 agg.)	Brøndby	Silkeborg
18:30 CEST	McCowatt 17'; Gammelby 66'	Report	Rajović 48'; Bischoff (yellow card) 53'	Stadium: JYSK Park; Attendance: 8,881; Referee: Jakob Kehlet

29 May 2025 Final	Copenhagen	3–0	Silkeborg	Herning
17:00 CEST	Larsson 3'; Lerager 34'; Elyounoussi 38'; Claesson (yellow card) 45+6'; Achouri (yellow card) 57'; Falk (yellow card) 77'	Report		Stadium: MCH Arena; Attendance: 11,048; Referee: Jacob Karlsen

=== UEFA Europa League ===
==== Second qualifying round ====
The draw was held on 19 June 2024.

25 July 2024 First leg	Molde (Norway)	3–1	(Denmark) Silkeborg	Molde, Norway
19:00 CEST	Kaasa 2'; Wolff Eikrem 45+1'; Eriksen 49'; Hagelskjær (yellow card) 89'	Report	Lind 35', (yellow card) 72'; Adamsen (yellow card) 50'; Sonne (yellow card) 89'	Stadium: Aker Stadion; Attendance: 3,900; Referee: Adam Ladebäck (Sweden)

1 August 2024 Second leg	Silkeborg (Denmark)	3–2 (4–5 agg.)	(Norway) Molde	Silkeborg
19:15 CEST	Adamsen 3' (pen.), 57'; Orazov (red card) 78'; Bakiz 88'	Report	Breivik 22'; Kaasa 81'	Stadium: JYSK Park; Attendance: 4,731; Referee: Luka Bilbija (Bosnia and Herzegovina)

=== UEFA Conference League ===
==== Third qualifying round ====
8 August 2024 First leg	Silkeborg (Denmark)	2–2	(Belgium) Gent	Silkeborg
18:30 CEST	Adamsen 49' (pen.), 90+5'	Report	Fortuna (yellow card) 50'; Ganchas 61' (o.g.); Guðjohnsen (yellow card) 65'; Gerkens (yellow card) 80'; Dean 90+3'	Stadium: JYSK Park; Attendance: 3,712; Referee: Christian-Petru Ciochirca (Austria)

15 August 2024 Second leg	Gent (Belgium)	3–2 (a.e.t.) (5–4 agg.)	(Denmark) Silkeborg	Ghent, Belgium
20:30 CEST	Dean 38'; Gandelman 90+3', 118', (yellow card) 119'; Delorge (yellow card) 109'	Report	Adamsen 33' (pen.), 51'; Andersen (yellow card) 62'; Ganchas (yellow card) 66'; Brink (yellow card) 66'; Freundlich (yellow card) 112'	Stadium: Planet Group Arena; Attendance: 8,769; Referee: José Luis Munuera Montero (Spain)
