= 2024 Danish Cup final =

2024 Pokalen final
- Event: 2023–24 Danish Cup
Silkeborg	AGF
1	0
- Date: 9 May 2024
- Venue: Parken, Copenhagen
- Man of the Match: Stefán Teitur Þórðarson
- Referee: Mikkel Redder
- Weather: 16°C, cloudy, 63% humidity, wind 19km/h

The 2024 Danish Cup final was played on 9 May 2024 between Silkeborg and AGF at Parken, Copenhagen. The final match was the culmination of the 2023–24 Danish Cup, the 70th season of the Pokalen.

Silkeborg appeared in just its 3rd cup final, 2001 being its lone championship. AGF is a 9-time Pokalen champion, its most recent title coming in 1996. Silkeborg prevailed and won its 2nd ever Pokalen title.

== Teams ==
Team	Previous finals appearances (bold indicates winners)
Silkeborg	2 (**2001**, 2018)
AGF	12 (**1955**, **1957**, 1959, **1960**, **1961**, **1965**, **1987**, **1988**, 1990, **1992**, **1996**, 2016)

== Venue ==
The final was played in Parken Stadium in Copenhagen, the 29th time Parken has hosted the Pokalen final.

== Route to the final ==
Note: In all results below, the score of the finalist is given first (H: home; A: away).

Silkeborg		Round	AGF	
Opponent	Result		Opponent	Result
Bye		First round	Bye	
Bye		Second round	Bye	
Nykøbing FC	0–1 (A)	Third round	Thisted FC	1–3 (A)
Hvidovre IF	1–5 (A)	Round of 16	Ishøj IF	0–4 (A)
F.C. Copenhagen	**3–2 (agg.)**; 0–2 (A) / 1–2 (H)	Quarter-finals	Brøndby IF	**3–2 (agg.)**; 1–2 (A) / 2–0 (H)
FC Fredericia	**6–3 (agg.)**; 0–2 (A) / 6–1 (H)	Semi-finals	FC Nordsjælland	**4–2 (agg.)**; 2–3 (A) / 1–0 (H)

== Match ==
=== Details ===
9 May 2024
17:00
Final

Silkeborg IF (1)	1–0	AGF (1)
Sonne 38' (Adamsen) (yellow card) 48'; Brink (yellow card) 68'; Klynge (yellow card) 75'; Þórðarson (yellow card) 90+2'	Report	Madsen (yellow card) 47'; Beijmo (yellow card) 75'; Jensen-Abbew (yellow card) 90'

Parken, Copenhagen
Attendance: 36,300
Referee: Mikkel Redder

GK	1	(Denmark) Nicolai Larsen
LB	2	(Denmark) Andreas Poulsen (substituted off) 74'
CB	4	(Denmark) Joel Felix
CB	25	(Sweden) Pontus Rödin
RB	5	(Peru) Oliver Sonne 38' (yellow card) 48' (substituted off) 89'
MF	14	(Denmark) Mark Brink (yellow card) 68'
MF	8	(Iceland) Stefán Teitur Þórðarson (yellow card) 90+2'
MF	6	(Denmark) Pelle Mattsson
MF	21	(Denmark) Anders Klynge (yellow card) 75'
MF	9	(Denmark) Alexander Lind (substituted off) 74'
FW	23	(Denmark) Tonni Adamsen (substituted off) 90+6'
Substitutes:
DF	24	(Zambia) Lubambo Musonda (substituted on) 74'
DF	19	(Denmark) Jens Martin Gammelby (substituted on) 74'
DF	29	(Denmark) Frederik Rieper (substituted on) 89'
MF	41	(Denmark) Oskar Boesen (substituted on) 90+6'
MF	20	(Denmark) Mads Larsen
DF	3	(Norway) Robin Østrøm
GK	16	(Denmark) Jacob Pryts
FW	17	(New Zealand) Callum McCowatt
FW	7	(Denmark) Kasper Kusk
Coach:
(Denmark) Kent Nielsen

GK	1	(Northern Ireland) Bailey Peacock-Farrell
RB	2	(Sweden) Felix Beijmo (yellow card) 75'
LB	3	(Netherlands) Mats Knoester (substituted off) 90+2'
CB	5	(Denmark) Frederik Tingager (substituted off) 86'
MF	6	(Denmark) Nicolai Poulsen (substituted off) 69'
MF	7	(Denmark) Mads Emil Madsen (yellow card) 47'
MF	19	(Sweden) Eric Kahl (substituted off) 69'
MF	11	(South Africa) Gift Links
MF	8	(Iceland) Mikael Anderson
FW	9	(Denmark) Patrick Mortensen
FW	31	(Denmark) Tobias Bech (substituted off) 85'
Substitutes:
MF	29	(Denmark) Frederik Brandhof (substituted on) 69'
DF	40	(Denmark) Jonas Jensen-Abbew (substituted on) 69' (yellow card) 90'
FW	13	(Germany) Janni Serra (substituted on) 85'
DF	4	(Denmark) Tobias Anker (substituted on) 86'
MF	15	(Norway) Magnus Knudsen (substituted on) 90+2'
DF	26	(Denmark) Jacob Andersen
MF	23	(Denmark) Tobias Bach
MF	33	(Denmark) Luka Callø
GK	1	(Denmark) Jesper Hansen
Coach:
(Germany) Uwe Rösler

Assistant referees: Lars Hummelgaard, Jesper Dahl
Fourth Official: Jacob Karlsen

**Match rules**

- 90 minutes.
- 30 minutes of extra time if necessary.
- Penalty shoot-out if scores still level.
- Seven named substitutes, of which up to five may be used.

== Broadcast ==
The game was broadcast on DR1, Denmark's national broadcaster, like previous years, as well as Viaplay, who becomes the exclusive broadcaster from 2024–25. Viaplay aired an alternate broadcast of the Final known as "Manager Mode", with presentations similar to football videogames like EA Sports FC.
