= Younes Bakiz =

Danish footballer (born 1999)

Personal information
- Full name: Younes Bakiz
- Date of birth: 5 February 1999 (age 27)
- Place of birth: Albertslund, Denmark
- Height: 1.86 m (6 ft 1 in)
- Position: Winger

Team information
- Current team: Raja CA (on loan from Silkeborg)
- Number: 14

Youth career
- –2012: Brøndby
- 2012–2014: Holbæk B&I
- 2014: HB Køge
- 2015–2016: Brøndby
- 2016–2018: Roskilde

Senior career*
Years	Team	Apps	(Gls)
2018–2020	Roskilde	39	(11)
2020–2022	Viborg	47	(5)
2022–2024	AaB	48	(11)
2024–	Silkeborg	54	(12)
2026–	→ Raja CA (loan)	1	(0)
- * Club domestic league appearances and goals as of 18:12, 8 October 2026 (UTC)

Younes Bakiz (born 5 February 1999) is a Danish professional footballer who plays as a winger for Botola club Raja CA, on loan from Danish Superliga club Silkeborg.

== Career ==
=== Early years ===
Growing up in Vestegnen to Moroccan parents, Bakiz played football as a youth for Brøndby IF, Holbæk B&I and HB Køge before making his breakthrough as part of FC Roskilde in 2018.

=== Viborg ===
After having made 43 appearances for Roskilde, in which he scored 13 goals, Bakiz signed a three-year contract with Viborg FF in June 2020. In his first season, he won the second-tier 1st Division with the club and secured promotion to the Danish Superliga. He made 21 appearances and scored three goals.

On 18 July 2021, Bakiz made his Superliga-debut in a 2–1 away win over Nordsjælland. Starting on the left wing, he scored the 1–1 equaliser in the 41st minute of the game, before being substituted by Jeff Mensah in the 78th minute.

=== AaB ===
On deadline day, 31 August 2022, Bakiz joined fellow league club AaB on a deal until June 2026. He made his competitive debut for the club four days later, coming on as a substitute in the 74th minute for Allan Sousa in a 2–0 away win over Midtjylland. On 14 October, he scored his first goals for AaB, a brace, which secured a 2–0 victory against Lyngby. He scored another brace on 30 October against his former side Brøndby in AaB's 3–2 away loss.

=== Silkeborg ===
On 12 June 2024, Danish Superliga club Silkeborg announced the signing of Bakiz on a four-year contract. On 21 April 2025, Bakiz scored his 10th league goal and provided his 8th league assist of the season in a 4–0 away win against Vejle.

==== Loan to Raja CA ====
On 13 September 2026, he joined Moroccan club Raja CA on a €50,000 loan-deal, with a €250,000 option to buy at the end of the season.

== Career statistics ==
As of match played 3 October 2026

Appearances and goals by club, season and competition
Club	Season	League			National cup (Note: Includes Danish Cup, Throne Cup)		Continental		Other		Total	
Club	Season	Division	Apps	Goals	Apps	Goals	Apps	Goals	Apps	Goals	Apps	Goals
Roskilde	2018–19	Danish 1st Division	15	4	2	0	—		—		17	4
Roskilde	2019–20	Danish 1st Division	24	7	2	2	—		—		26	9
Roskilde	Total		39	11	4	2	—		—		43	13
Viborg	2020–21	Danish 1st Division	20	2	1	1	—		—		21	3
Viborg	2021–22	Danish Superliga	27	3	0	0	—		1 (Note: Appearance in Danish Superliga European play-off match)	0	28	3
Viborg	Total		47	5	1	1	—		1	0	49	6
AaB	2022–23	Danish Superliga	21	6	5	1	—		—		26	7
AaB	2023–24	Danish 1st Division	27	5	2	0	—		—		29	5
AaB	Total		48	11	7	1	—		—		55	12
Silkeborg	2024–25	Danish Superliga	25	10	4	3	3 (Note: One appearance and one goal in UEFA Europa League, two appearances in UEFA Conference League)	1	0	0	32	14
Silkeborg	2025–26	Danish Superliga	25	2	1	0	3 (Note: Appearances in UEFA Conference League)	0	—		29	2
Silkeborg	2026–27	Danish Superliga	5	0	1	0	—		—		6	0
Silkeborg	Total		55	12	6	3	6	1	0	0	67	16
Raja CA (loan)	2026–27	Botola Pro	1	0	0	0	0	0	—		1	0
Career total			190	39	18	7	6	1	1	0	215	47

== Honours ==
Viborg

- Danish 1st Division: 2020–21
