= 2025 Danish Cup final =

2025 Pokalen final
- Event: 2024–25 Danish Cup
Copenhagen	Silkeborg
3	0
- Date: 29 May 2025
- Venue: MCH Arena, Herning
- Referee: Jacob Karlsen
- Attendance: 11,048

The 2025 Danish Cup final was played on 29 May 2025 between Copenhagen and Silkeborg at MCH Arena in Herning. The final match was the culmination of the 2024–25 Danish Cup, the 71st season of the Pokalen.

Heading into the final, Copenhagen had won the Danish Cup nine times, their most recent title being in 2023. Silkeborg appeared in their fourth final, having previously won the trophy in 2001 and 2024.

Copenhagen were victorious, becoming the first club to win ten Danish Cups, and securing a league and cup double.

== Teams ==
Team	Previous finals appearances (bold indicates winners)
Silkeborg	3 (**2001**, 2018, **2024**)
Copenhagen	13 (**1995**, **1997**, 1998, 2002, **2004**, 2007, **2009**, **2012**, 2014, **2015**, **2016**, **2017**, **2023**)

== Venue ==
The final was played in MCH Arena in Herning, the first time MCH Arena has hosted the Pokalen final.

== Route to the final ==
Note: In all results below, the score of the finalist is given first (H: home; A: away).

Copenhagen		Round	Silkeborg	
Opponent	Result		Opponent	Result
Bye		First round	Bye	
Bye		Second round	Bye	
HB Køge	0–2 (A)	Third round	Sønderjyske	1–2 (A)
Roskilde	1–3 (A)	Round of 16	Holbæk B&I	0–6 (A)
Kolding	**4–1 (agg.)**; 1–3 (A) / 1–0 (H)	Quarter-finals	AaB	**4–3 (agg.)**; 1–2 (A) / 2–2 (H)
Viborg	**2–0 (agg.)**; 0–1 (A) / 1–0 (H)	Semi-finals	Brøndby	**5–4 (agg.)**; 3–3 (A) / 2–1 (H)

== Match ==
=== Details ===
29 May 2025
17:00
Final

Copenhagen (1)	3–0	Silkeborg (1)
Larsson 3' (Elyounoussi); Lerager 34' (Larsson); Elyounoussi 38'; Claesson (yellow card) 45+6'; Achouri (yellow card) 57'; Falk (yellow card) 77'	Report

MCH Arena, Herning
Attendance: 11,048
Referee: Jacob Karlsen

Assistant referees: Deniz Yurdakul, Steffen Bramsen
Fourth Official: Lasse Graagaard

**Match rules**

- 90 minutes.
- 30 minutes of extra time if necessary.
- Penalty shoot-out if scores still level.
- Seven named substitutes, of which up to five may be used.

== Broadcast ==
Unlike previous years, the match was exclusively broadcast on Viaplay Sport News, after the video streaming service's 2024 acquisition of the rights to the Danish Cup until 2030.
