= Oliver Sonne =

Peruvian footballer (born 2000)

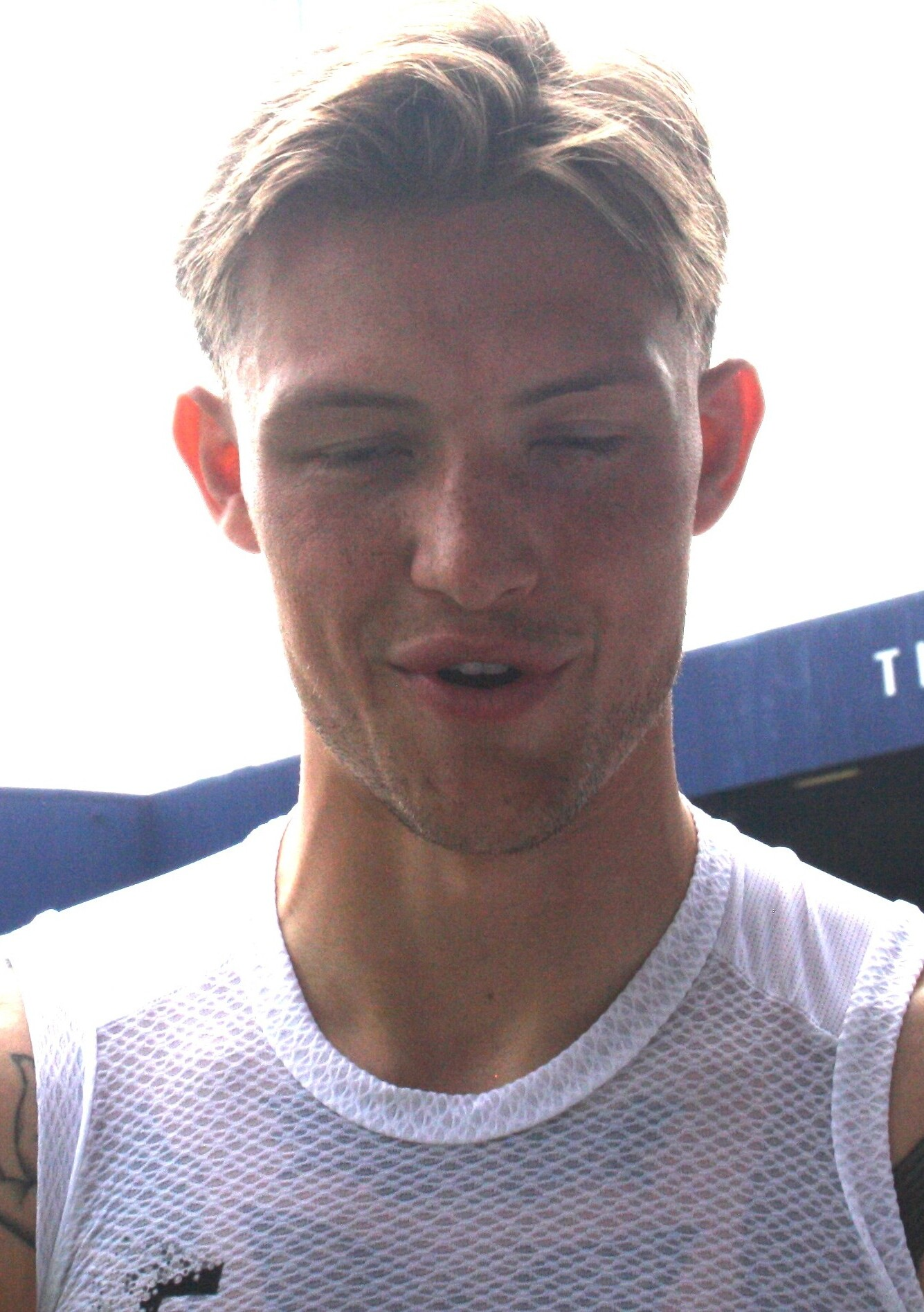
- Sonne in 2025

Personal information
- Full name: Oliver Sonne Christensen
- Date of birth: 10 November 2000 (age 26)
- Place of birth: Herfølge, Denmark
- Height: 1.84 m (6 ft 0 in)
- Position: Right-back

Team information
- Current team: Burnley
- Number: 22

Youth career
- Ejby IF Fodbold
- Rishøj IF
- HB Køge
- 2018–2019: Copenhagen

Senior career*
Years	Team	Apps	(Gls)
2019–2021	HB Køge	30	(0)
2021–2025	Silkeborg	91	(8)
2025–	Burnley	20	(1)
2026	→ Sparta Prague (loan)	15	(2)

International career^{‡}
2024–	Peru	20	(0)
- * Club domestic league appearances and goals as of 09:49, 8 November 2026 (UTC) ‡ National team caps and goals as of 19:28, 3 October 2026 (UTC)

Oliver Sonne Christensen (born 10 November 2000) is a professional footballer who plays as a right-back for EFL Championship club Burnley. Born in Denmark, he plays for the Peru national team.

An academy product of various Danish clubs, Sonne began his professional career at HB Køge, where he spent two seasons. In 2021, he joined Silkeborg, winning the Danish Cup in his third season with the club, before joining English side Burnley in 2025.

Sonne represents Peru at international level, being eligible through his maternal grandmother. He represented the nation at the 2024 Copa América.

== Club career ==
=== Early career ===
Sonne started playing football at Ejby IF Fodbold, and later also played for Rishøj IF and HB Køge. After being spotted by scouts on the app Tonsser, he was invited to club trials with Marseille and Copenhagen. The French club wanted to see him again, but Sonne decided to stay in Denmark and signed a 18-month contract with Copenhagen in February 2018, where he played for the U19 and reserve teams.

In June 2019, Sonne returned to HB Køge, where he signed a two-year professional deal with his former club. Sonne played in Køge for two years, where he made a total of 34 appearances.

=== Silkeborg ===
On 11 May 2021, Sonne was sold to newly promoted Danish Superliga club Silkeborg, signing a two-year contract. Sonne made his official debut on 29 August against Randers in the league. On 7 December, Sonne signed a contract extension until June 2026.

Sonne scored his first professional goal on 18 September 2022, scoring after being assisted by Kasper Kusk.

He was named in the Superliga Team of the Month for September 2023. On 9 May 2024, Sonne scored the only goal of the 2024 Danish Cup final against AGF in the 38th minute, sealing Silkeborg's second ever Danish Cup title.

=== Burnley ===
On 31 December 2024, EFL Championship club Burnley announced the signing of Sonne on a four-and-a-half-year deal. On 11 January 2025, Sonne made his debut for the club in a 3–1 victory over Reading in the FA Cup third round. On 29 August, he scored his first goal for Burnley, a stoppage time winner against Derby County, to send his team through to the 2025–26 EFL Cup third round.

==== Loan to Sparta Prague ====
On 29 January 2026, Sonne joined Czech First League club Sparta Prague on a half-year loan deal.

== International career ==
Sonne is of Peruvian descent through his maternal grandmother; the Peruvian Football Federation and then-manager Juan Reynoso began talks with Sonne around May 2023 and he began applying for Peruvian citizenship. Sonne was part of the Peru squad in the matches against Chile and Argentina for the 2026 FIFA World Cup qualifiers.

Sonne made his debut for Peru in a friendly against Nicaragua on 22 March 2024, appearing as a substitute for Miguel Trauco.

== Personal life ==
Sonne is the nephew of the Danish supermodel and photographer Helena Christensen. Beside football, Sonne also worked as a fashion model, like his aunt.

== Career statistics ==
=== Club ===
As of match played 7 November 2026

Appearances and goals by club, season and competition
Club	Season	League			National cup (Note: Includes Danish Cup, FA Cup, Czech Cup)		League cup (Note: Includes EFL Cup)		Europe		Total	
Club	Season	Division	Apps	Goals	Apps	Goals	Apps	Goals	Apps	Goals	Apps	Goals
HB Køge	2019–20	Danish 1st Division	10	0	2	0	—		—		12	0
HB Køge	2020–21	Danish 1st Division	20	1	2	0	—		—		22	1
HB Køge	Total		30	1	4	0	—		—		34	1
Silkeborg	2021–22	Danish Superliga	15	0	1	0	—		—		16	0
Silkeborg	2022–23	Danish Superliga	29	4	6	1	—		7 (Note: Two appearances in UEFA Europa League, five appearances in UEFA Europa Conference League)	0	42	2
Silkeborg	2023–24	Danish Superliga	31	1	5	2	—		—		36	3
Silkeborg	2024–25	Danish Superliga	16	3	2	1	—		4 (Note: Two appearances in UEFA Europa League, two appearances in UEFA Conference League)	0	22	4
Silkeborg	Total		91	8	14	4	—		11	0	116	12
Burnley	2024–25	Championship	2	0	3	0	—		—		5	0
Burnley	2025–26	Premier League	7	1	1	0	2	1	—		10	2
Burnley	2026–27	Championship	11	0	0	0	1	0	—		12	0
Burnley	Total		20	1	4	0	3	1	—		27	2
Sparta Prague (loan)	2025–26	Czech First League	15	2	1	0	—		2 (Note: Appearances in UEFA Europa Conference League)	0	18	2
Career totals			156	12	23	4	2	1	13	0	194	17

=== International ===
As of match played 3 October 2026

Appearances and goals by national team and year
National team	Year	Apps	Goals
Peru	2024	10	0
Peru	2025	3	0
Peru	2026	7	0
Total		20	0

== Honours ==
Silkeborg

- Danish Cup: 2023–24

Individual

- Superliga Team of the Month: September 2023, October 2023
