= Mark Brink =

Danish footballer (born 1998)

Personal information
- Full name: Mark Brink Christensen
- Date of birth: 15 March 1998 (age 28)
- Place of birth: Esbjerg, Denmark
- Height: 1.74 m (5 ft 9 in)
- Position: Midfielder

Team information
- Current team: Nordsjælland
- Number: 6

Youth career
- 2002–2015: Esbjerg fB

Senior career*
Years	Team	Apps	(Gls)
2015–2020	Esbjerg fB	89	(6)
2020–2024	Silkeborg	137	(2)
2024–	Nordsjælland	63	(1)

International career
2013–2014	Denmark U16	7	(4)
2014–2015	Denmark U17	12	(4)
2015–2016	Denmark U18	5	(0)
2015–2017	Denmark U19	9	(2)
2017–2019	Denmark U20	6	(1)
- * Club domestic league appearances and goals as of 18 October 2026

Mark Brink Christensen (born 15 March 1998) is a Danish professional footballer who plays as a midfielder for and captains Danish Superliga club Nordsjælland.

== Club career ==
=== Esbjerg fB ===
Born in Esbjerg, Denmark, Brink is a product of Esbjerg fB and has played for the club his entire youth career. He was the captain of the under-17 team and was promoted to the under-19 team at age 17. was promoted to the first team squad in the autumn of 2015 at the age of 17.

In March 2015, Brink won the Under-17 Talent of the Year 2015 award by the Danish Football Association. He made his debut on 1 October 2015 in Danish Cup match against amateur side, Søhus Stige BK, where Brink played the full ninety minutes in a 9–0 victory.

Brink made his league debut for Esbjerg on 4 April 2016 at the age of 18. Brink started on the pitch, but was replaced by Lasse Rise in the 62nd minute in a 1–0 victory against Viborg FF in the Danish Superliga. A few days later, he extended his contract until 2019.

After an individual successful period, his contract was extended once again in April 2017 until 2021.

On 25 July 2019, Brink made his European debut, starting in a 2–0 away loss to Belarusian club Shakhtyor Soligorsk in the second qualifying round of the UEFA Europa League.

=== Silkeborg ===
On transfer deadline day, 31 January 2020, Brink joined Silkeborg IF on a three-year contract.

He made his competitive debut for the club on 16 February, replacing Vegard Moberg in the 84th minute of a 2–0 home loss to AaB. Silkeborg suffered relegation to the Danish 1st Division at the end of the 2019–20 season, bottom of the league.

On 11 September 2020, Brink scored his first goal for Silkeborg in the 92nd minute of a 4–2 away loss to FC Helsingør on the first matchday of the 2020–21 Danish 1st Division. Silkeborg bounced back to the Danish Superliga that season, finishing second in the league with Brink as a starter. He made 29 appearances, scoring the one goal.

With Brink as one of the key players in midfield, Silkeborg was one of the positive surprises of the 2021–22 season, impressing with an attacking and entertaining style of play under head coach Kent Nielsen. Due to the 2022 Russian invasion of Ukraine, all Russian teams were excluded from European tournaments by UEFA. This meant that the Danish Cup winners entered the final qualifying round for the UEFA Europa League. When FC Midtjylland won the 2021–22 Danish Cup, and at the same time finished in second place in the Superliga, which now gave access to UEFA Champions League qualification, Silkeborg secured Europa League qualification by virtue of their third-place Superliga finish. Brink finished the season with 34 appearances in which he scored one goal.

=== Nordsjælland ===
On 2 September 2024, Nordsjælland announced the signing of Brink on a contract until June 2027.

== Career statistics ==
As of match played 18 October 2026

Appearances and goals by club, season and competition
Club	Season	League			Danish Cup		Continental		Other		Total	
Club	Season	Division	Apps	Goals	Apps	Goals	Apps	Goals	Apps	Goals	Apps	Goals
Esbjerg fB	2015–16	Danish Superliga	6	1	1	0	—		—		7	1
Esbjerg fB	2016–17	Danish Superliga	12	0	0	0	—		2 (Note: Appearances in the Danish Superliga promotion/relegation play-offs)	0	14	0
Esbjerg fB	2017–18	Danish 1st Division	31	5	1	0	—		2	0	35	5
Esbjerg fB	2018–19	Danish Superliga	30	0	4	0	—		—		34	0
Esbjerg fB	2019–20	Danish Superliga	10	0	0	0	2 (Note: Appearances in UEFA Europa League)	0	—		12	0
Esbjerg fB	Total		89	6	5	0	2	0	4	0	100	6
Silkeborg	2019–20	Danish Superliga	10	0	0	0	—		—		10	0
Silkeborg	2020–21	Danish 1st Division	29	1	2	0	—		—		31	1
Silkeborg	2021–22	Danish Superliga	32	1	2	0	—		—		34	1
Silkeborg	2022–23	Danish Superliga	29	0	4	0	7 (Note: Appearances in UEFA Europa League and UEFA Europa Conference League)	0	—		40	0
Silkeborg	2023–24	Danish Superliga	32	0	7	0	—		—		39	0
Silkeborg	2024–25	Danish Superliga	5	0	0	0	4	0	—		9	0
Silkeborg	Total		137	2	15	0	11	0	—		163	2
Nordsjælland	2024–25	Danish Superliga	24	0	2	0	—		—		26	0
Nordsjælland	2025–26	Danish Superliga	29	0	4	0	—		—		33	0
Nordsjælland	2026–27	Danish Superliga	10	1	1	0	6 (Note: Appearances in UEFA Conference League)	0	—		17	1
Nordsjælland	Total		63	1	7	0	6	0	—		76	1
Career total			285	9	27	0	19	0	4	0	335	9

== Honours ==
Silkeborg

- Danish Cup: 2023–24
