= Bjarne Pudel =

German footballer (born 2001)

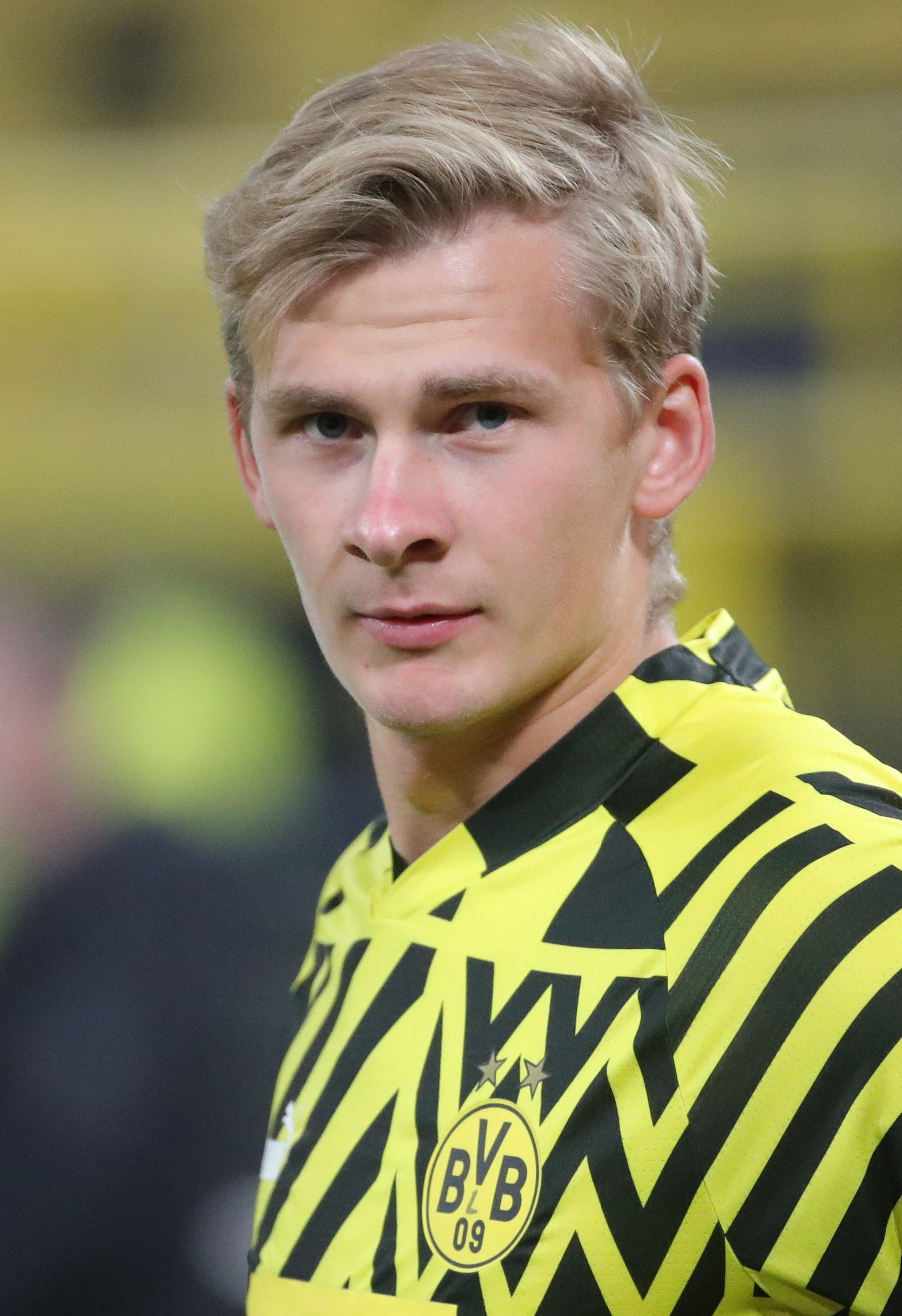
- Pudel in 2022

Personal information
- Date of birth: 9 May 2001 (age 25)
- Place of birth: Versmold, Germany
- Height: 1.88 m (6 ft 2 in)
- Position: Centre-back

Team information
- Current team: AaB
- Number: 13

Youth career
- SG Oesterweg
- Spvg Versmold
- –2017: VfL Theesen
- 2017–2020: Arminia Bielefeld

Senior career*
Years	Team	Apps	(Gls)
2020–2022	SC Wiedenbrück	75	(0)
2022–2024	Borussia Dortmund II	29	(2)
2024–	AaB	24	(1)
- * Club domestic league appearances and goals as of 7 October 2025

Bjarne Pudel (born 9 May 2001) is a German professional footballer who plays as a centre-back for Danish 1st Division club AaB.

== Early life ==
Pudel grew up in Versmold, Germany. He played handball as a child. As a youth player, he joined the youth academy of German side Arminia Bielefeld, where he captained the club.

== Career ==
Pudel started his career with SC Wiedenbrück. He was regarded as one of the club's most important players. On 5 September 2020, he debuted for the club during a 1–1 draw with Rot-Weiss Essen. On 13 March 2021, he scored his first goal for the club during a 2–0 win over Fortuna Köln. In 2023, he signed for Borussia Dortmund II. On 10 October 2022, he debuted for the club during a 0–0 draw with Hallescher FC. On 26 March 2023, he scored his first goal for the club during a 4–1 win over 1860 Munich.

On 11 July 2024, newly promoted Danish Superliga club AaB confirmed that Pudel joined the club on a contract until June 2028.

== Style of play ==
Pudel mainly operates as a defender.

== Personal life ==
Pudel has regarded Germany international Mats Hummels as his football idol.
