= Oliver Drost =

Danish footballer (born 1995)

Personal information
- Full name: Oliver Vugrin Flindt Drost
- Date of birth: 4 November 1995 (age 31)
- Place of birth: Helsingør, Denmark
- Height: 1.87 m (6 ft 2 in)
- Position: Forward

Team information
- Current team: Helsingør (assistant)

Youth career
- Snekkersten
- Helsingør
- 2009–2010: B.93
- 2010–2013: Helsingør
- 2013–2014: Søllerød-Vedbæk

Senior career*
Years	Team	Apps	(Gls)
2014–2016	B.93	67	(25)
2016–2017	Vejle	10	(0)
2017	→ Horsens (loan)	4	(2)
2018–2019	Horsens	35	(4)
2019–2020	Kolding IF	3	(0)
2020	Horsens	6	(0)
2020–2021	Kolding	28	(10)
2021–2024	Helsingør	75	(9)
2024	Bengaluru	9	(0)
2024–2025	Helsingør	25	(9)
Total		262	(59)

International career
2014	Denmark U19	2	(0)
2016	Denmark U20	1	(0)

Managerial career
- 2025–: Helsingør (assistant)
- * Club domestic league appearances and goals

Oliver Vugrin Flindt Drost (born 4 November 1995) is a Danish retired professional footballer who played as a forward. He is currently assistant manager of FC Helsingør.

== Career ==
=== B.93 ===
In the spring 2014, Drost returned to his former youth club, B.93, where he joined the senior squad at the age of 18, signing a two-year contract and immediately debuted in the Danish 2nd Division against Næstved BK.

In the spring of 2014, Drost played 14 games, eight of them starting from the bench. In the following season, he played 26 games, scoring 8 goals. He left the club in the summer 2016, joining Vejle Boldklub.

=== AC Horsens ===
On 31 August 2017 AC Horsens announced, that they had loaned Drost from Vejle for the rest of the year. Horsens bought him free at the end of the loan spell.

=== Kolding IF ===
On 23 October 2019, Drost joined Kolding IF on a free agent on a contract for the rest of the year. The club announced on 4 January 2020, that he wouldn't get his contract extended.

=== AC Horsens ===
After a few weeks on trial, Drost returned to AC Horsens and signed a contract for the rest of the season. The club confirmed on 21 July 2020, that Drost would leave at the end of his contract.

=== Return to Kolding ===
On 8 September 2020, Drost returned to Kolding IF as a free agent, signing a one-year contract.

=== Return to Helsingør ===
On 11 January 2021, Drost signed a pre-contract, in effect from 1 July 2021, with his former youth club FC Helsingør.

=== Bengaluru FC ===
On 22 January 2024, Indian Super League club Bengaluru FC announced the signing of Drost until the end of the 2023–24 season.

=== Return to Helsingør ===
On July 10, 2024, FC Helsingør confirmed Drost's return to the club, which had just been relegated to the Danish 2nd Division.

On August 15, 2025, 29-year-old Drost revealed in an interview that he had retired from football due to knee arthritis.

== Coaching career ==
After retiring, FC Helsingør confirmed on 19 August 2025, that Drost would continue at the club as an assistant manager.

== Personal life ==
Drost's father is from Croatia, while his mother is Danish. He is also the cousin of Emil Berggreen, who also is a footballer. Drost actually went on a trial at his cousins former club, Mainz 05, where Berggreen was playing for at the time. Oliver's sister, Olivia, is also a footballer and has also played for the Danish youth national teams.
