= Fredrik Carlsen (Danish footballer) =

Danish footballer (born 2001)

Personal information
- Full name: Fredrik Bennedsgaard Carlsen
- Date of birth: 1 December 2001 (age 24)
- Place of birth: Vesterbro, Copenhagen, Denmark
- Height: 1.93 m (6 ft 4 in)
- Position: Midfielder

Team information
- Current team: FC Ingolstadt
- Number: 8

Youth career
- Brøndby
- B.93
- Hvidovre

Senior career*
Years	Team	Apps	(Gls)
2020–2023	Hvidovre	68	(16)
2023–2025	Silkeborg	20	(2)
2025–	FC Ingolstadt	34	(5)
- * Club domestic league appearances and goals as of 29 May 2026

Fredrik Bennedsgaard Carlsen (born 1 December 2001) is a Danish professional footballer who plays as a midfielder for 3. Liga club FC Ingolstadt.

== Club career ==
Before moving to Hvidovre, Carlsen played youth football in B.93 and Brøndby.

In October 2020, 18-year-old Carlsen made his debut for Hvidovre's first team in a Danish Cup match against KFUMs Boldklub. In February and March 2021, Carlsen also made three appearances for Hvidovre in the Danish 1st Division. In his final season in Hvidovre, Carlsen scored 10 goals and 6 assists in 29 games, helping Hvidovre secure promotion to the 2023–24 Danish Superliga.

On 3 May 2023, Danish Superliga club Silkeborg confirmed that they had signed Carlsen on a deal until the end of 2027. On 23 July, he made his debut for the club in a league match against Brøndby. In total, he made 28 appearances for Silkeborg during the two seasons he spent with the club.

On 24 July 2025, Carlsen joined 3. Liga club FC Ingolstadt. On 2 August, he made his debut for the club in a 1–1 home draw against Jahn Regensburg, coming on as a substitute in the second half. On 30 August, he scored his first goal for FC Ingolstadt in a 1–1 away draw against Energie Cottbus.
