= Pelle Mattsson =

Danish footballer (born 2001)

Personal information
- Full name: Pelle Elkjær Mattsson
- Date of birth: 4 August 2001 (age 25)
- Place of birth: Marstal, Denmark
- Height: 1.84 m (6 ft 0 in)
- Position: Midfielder

Team information
- Current team: Norwich City
- Number: 7

Youth career
- Marstal IF
- ØBG Fodbold
- 2014–2019: Silkeborg

Senior career*
Years	Team	Apps	(Gls)
2019–2025	Silkeborg	120	(4)
2025–	Norwich City	37	(3)

International career
2019	Denmark U19	3	(0)
- * Club domestic league appearances and goals as of 2 September 2026 (UTC)

Pelle Elkjær Mattsson (born 4 August 2001) is a Danish professional footballer who plays as a midfielder for EFL Championship club Norwich City.

== Club career ==
=== Silkeborg ===
Mattsson joined Silkeborg IF at the age of 11 from local partner club ØBG Fodbold. On 7 February 2019, 17-year-old Mattson signed a trainee-contract with Silkeborg, after good performances for the first team in training and in friendly games. Mattsson was supposed to continue on the club's U19 team and occasionally train with the first team. However, Mattsson was called up for three first team games, before he got his official debut for the team on 21 April against Hvidovre in the Danish 1st Division. Mattsson started on the bench, before replacing Ronnie Schwartz in the 89th minute.

Silkeborg won promotion to the Danish Superliga for the 2019–20 season. Mattsson made his debut in the highest football league in Denmark on 8 July 2020, the same day he signed his first four-and-a-half-year professional contract with Silkeborg.

=== Norwich City ===
On 29 August 2025, EFL Championship club Norwich City announced the signing of Mattsson on a contract until 2028. On 20 September, he made his debut for the club in a 3–2 home defeat to Wrexham in the league. On 21 March 2026, Mattsson scored his first goal for the club in a 1‍–‍0 away win against Charlton Athletic at The Valley.

== Personal life ==
Pelle's older brother, Magnus Mattsson, is also a footballer, playing for Copenhagen. Their father, Joakim Mattsson, who is from Sweden, is a football manager.

== Career statistics ==
=== Club ===
As of match played 8 August 2026

Appearances and goals by club, season and competition
Club	Season	League			National cup (Note: Includes Danish Cup, FA Cup)		League cup (Note: Includes EFL Cup)		Europe		Other		Total	
Club	Season	Division	Apps	Goals	Apps	Goals	Apps	Goals	Apps	Goals	Apps	Goals	Apps	Goals
Silkeborg	2018–19	Danish 1st Division	1	0	0	0	—		—		—		1	0
Silkeborg	2019–20	Danish Superliga	1	0	0	0	—		—		—		1	0
Silkeborg	2020–21	Danish 1st Division	17	0	1	0	—		—		—		18	0
Silkeborg	2021–22	Danish Superliga	18	0	2	0	—		—		—		20	0
Silkeborg	2022–23	Danish Superliga	24	1	5	0	—		2 (Note: One appearance in UEFA Europa League, one appearance in UEFA Europa Conference League)	0	—		31	1
Silkeborg	2023–24	Danish Superliga	28	2	6	1	—		—		—		34	3
Silkeborg	2024–25	Danish Superliga	25	1	7	1	—		1 (Note: Appearance in UEFA Europa League)	0	1 (Note: Appearance in Danish Superliga European play-off match)	1	34	3
Silkeborg	2025–26	Danish Superliga	6	0	—		—		4 (Note: Appearances in UEFA Conference League)	0	—		10	0
Silkeborg	Total		120	4	21	2	0	0	7	0	1	1	149	7
Norwich City	2025–26	Championship	33	3	1	0	—		—		—		34	3
Norwich City	2026–27	Championship	0	0	0	0	1	0	—		—		1	0
Norwich City	Total		33	3	1	0	1	0	0	0	0	0	35	3
Career total			153	7	22	2	1	0	7	0	1	1	184	10

== Honours ==
Silkeborg

- Danish 1st Division: 2019–20
- Danish Cup: 2023–24
