= Pontus Rödin =

Swedish footballer (born 2000)

Personal information
- Full name: Pontus Anders Rödin
- Date of birth: 16 August 2000 (age 26)
- Place of birth: Linköping, Sweden
- Height: 1.89 m (6 ft 2 in)
- Position: Centre-back

Team information
- Current team: Silkeborg
- Number: 25

Youth career
- BK Derby
- MB United
- –2016: AFK Linköping

Senior career*
Years	Team	Apps	(Gls)
2016–2017	AFK Linköping	19	(1)
2018–2019	Linköping City	38	(0)
2018	→ AFK Linköping (loan)	1	(0)
2019–2021	AFC Eskilstuna	46	(1)
2022–2024	Brage	52	(3)
2024–	Silkeborg	27	(2)

International career
2021	Sweden U-19	2	(0)
- * Club domestic league appearances and goals as of 16:40, 21 April 2025 (UTC)

Pontus Anders Rödin (born 16 August 2000) is a Swedish professional footballer who plays as a centre-back for Danish Superliga club Silkeborg.

== Honours ==
Silkeborg

- Danish Cup: 2023–24
