= Andreas Poulsen =

Danish footballer (born 1999)

Personal information
- Full name: Andreas Poulsen
- Date of birth: 13 October 1999 (age 27)
- Place of birth: Ikast, Denmark
- Height: 1.88 m (6 ft 2 in)
- Position: Left-back

Team information
- Current team: Silkeborg
- Number: 2

Youth career
- Ikast KFUM
- Herning Fremad
- Midtjylland

Senior career*
| Years | Team | Apps | (Gls) |
| 2016–2018 | Midtjylland | 8 | (0) |
| 2018–2022 | Borussia Mönchengladbach II | 24 | (0) |
| 2018–2022 | Borussia Mönchengladbach | 0 | (0) |
| 2020 | → Austria Wien (loan) | 5 | (0) |
| 2021 | → Austria Wien (loan) | 11 | (0) |
| 2021–2022 | → FC Ingolstadt (loan) | 6 | (1) |
| 2022–2024 | AaB | 20 | (1) |
| 2023–2024 | → Silkeborg (loan) | 16 | (0) |
| 2024– | Silkeborg | 50 | (1) |

International career
| 2014 | Denmark U16 | 2 | (0) |
| 2015–2016 | Denmark U17 | 14 | (2) |
| 2016 | Denmark U18 | 2 | (0) |
| 2017–2018 | Denmark U19 | 10 | (5) |
| 2018–2021 | Denmark U21 | 17 | (1) |
- * Club domestic league appearances and goals as of 16:06, 15 November 2026 (UTC)

Andreas Poulsen (born 13 October 1999) is a Danish professional footballer who plays as a left-back for Danish Superliga club Silkeborg.

== Club career ==
=== Midtjylland ===
Poulsen started his career in the local football club, Ikast KFUM. He made his professional debut in the Danish Superliga for Midtjylland on 1 December 2016 in a game against Silkeborg, where he played the whole game on the left back.

Poulsen won the 'Academy Player of The Year' award at FC Midtjylland for the 2017–18 season.

=== Borussia Mönchengladbach ===
After a great 2017–18 season for Poulsen with 12 games played for the first team, Poulsen was sold to Borussia Mönchengladbach for 34 million Danish kroner (€4.5 million) which could further increase to 50 million kroner (€6.7 million). This made him the most expensive teenager in Danish football history. Poulsen signed a five-year contract with the German club.

=== Austria Wien ===
On 3 January 2020, it was announced that Poulsen had been loaned to Austria Wien of the Austrian Bundesliga for the remainder of the season.

On 8 February 2021, Poulson moved for a second time to Austria Wien, on a loan deal until the end of the season.

=== FC Ingolstadt ===
On 19 August 2021, it was announced that Poulsen had been loaned to 2. Bundesliga side FC Ingolstadt 04, until the end of the season.

=== AaB ===
At the end of June 2022 it was confirmed that Poulsen had returned to his homeland, signing a deal until June 2026 with Danish Superliga side AaB.

=== Silkeborg ===
At the end of August 2023, Poulsen joined Silkeborg on a one-year loan deal. After the season, the deal was made permanent, with Poulsen signing a three-year contract.

== Honours ==
Silkeborg

- Danish Cup: 2023–24
