= Tonni Adamsen =

Danish footballer (born 1994)

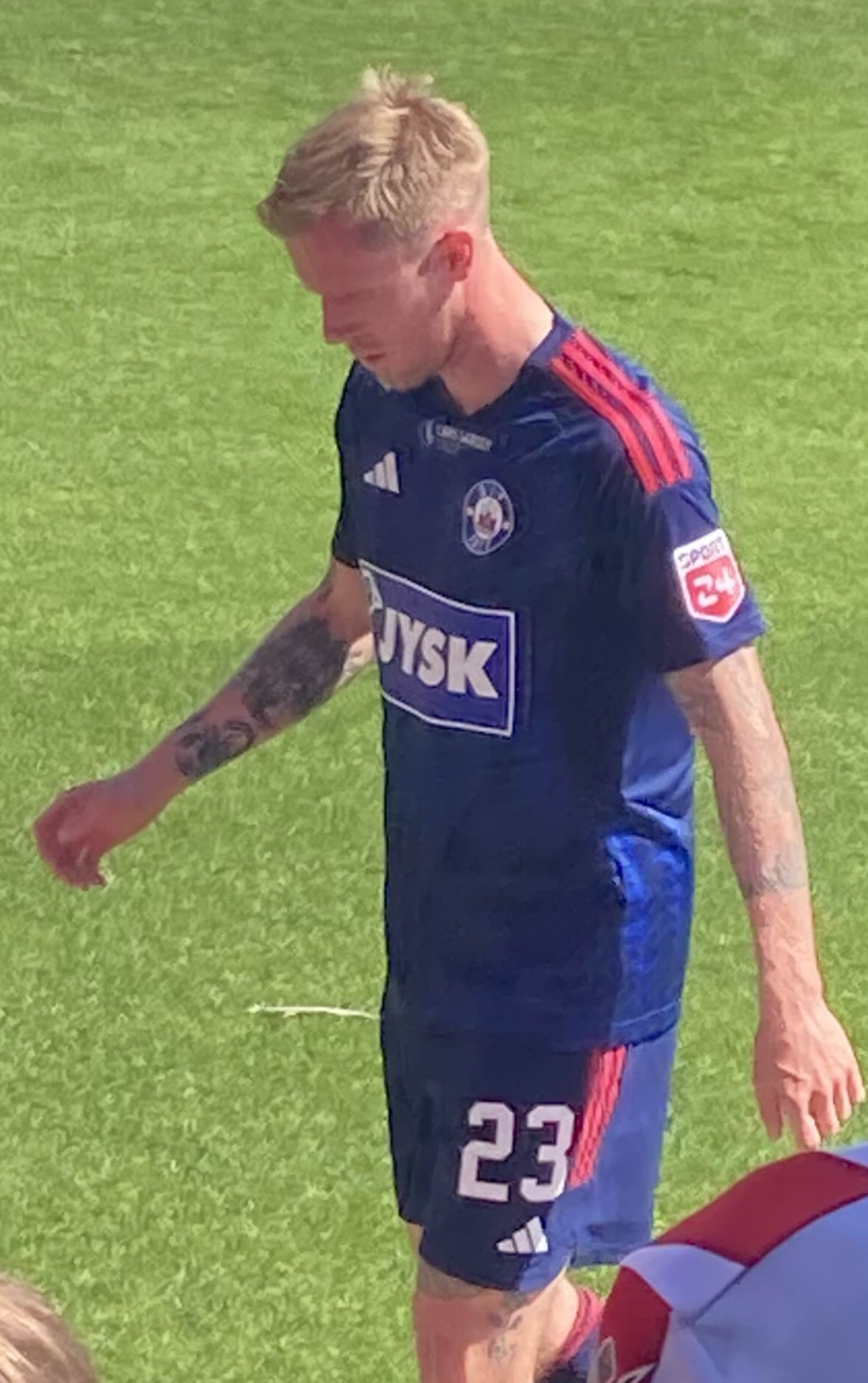
- Adamsen with Silkeborg in 2025

Personal information
- Full name: Tonni Adamsen
- Date of birth: 15 November 1994 (age 31)
- Place of birth: Taastrup, Denmark
- Height: 1.80 m (5 ft 11 in)
- Position: Striker

Team information
- Current team: Rapid Wien
- Number: 8

Youth career
- –2009: Brøndby

Senior career*
Years	Team	Apps	(Gls)
2009–2018	Taastrup FC		
2018–2021	Frem	61	(22)
2021–2022	Helsingør	45	(19)
2022–2026	Silkeborg	119	(44)
2026–	Rapid Wien	12	(5)
- * Club domestic league appearances and goals as of 17:30, 12 November 2026 (UTC)

Tonni Adamsen (born 15 November 1994) is a Danish professional footballer who plays as a striker for Austrian Bundesliga side Rapid Wien.

Adamsen began his senior career with Taastrup FC, moving to Danish 2nd Division side Frem in 2018. He spent two and a half seasons with the Copenhagen-based club, before signing for Helsingør in the Danish 1st Division in January 2021, where he played two full seasons. In August 2022, he joined Silkeborg and went on to win the 2023–24 Danish Cup, while also being named Silkeborg Player of the Year for 2024.

== Club career ==
=== Early career ===
Born in Taastrup, Tonni Adamsen started his career at local club Taastrup FC after spending a period in Brøndby's academy.

=== Frem ===
In the summer of 2018, Adamsen joined Frem in the Danish 2nd Division. After impressing during the first half of the season, on 2 January 2019, the club announced that his contract would be extended. On 4 April, a new contract extension was confirmed by the club. On 17 August, he scored directly from a corner in a 2–1 home defeat to Slagelse B&I in the league. On 21 November 2020, in his final game for the club, Adamsen scored a hat-trick in a 5–3 win against SfB-Oure FA. In January 2021, after the expiry of his contract, Adamsen chose not to renew it and left the club.

=== Helsingør ===
On 19 January 2021, Adamsen was signed by Danish 1st Division side Helsingør on a one-year contract. On 22 June, his contract with the club was extended for another year and a half, until the summer of 2023. On 24 March 2022, Adamsen's contract was extended once again, this time until the summer of 2025. On 14 May, he assisted all three goals in a 3–3 away draw in the league against Horsens. On 2 August, in what would be his final match for Helsingør, Adamsen scored a brace in a 4–2 away win against Hvidovre in the 2022–23 Danish Cup first round.

=== Silkeborg ===
On 6 August 2022, Danish Superliga club Silkeborg announced the signing of Adamsen on a contract until the summer of 2026. Just two days later, on 8 August, he marked his debut for the club with a goal, capping off a 3–1 home victory over AaB in the Superliga. On 29 March 2024, Adamsen scored his first hat-trick for Silkeborg in their 6–1 home win in the 2023–24 Danish Cup semi-final first leg against Fredericia.

After a prolific start to the 2024–25 season, scoring eight goals in the first ten matches, Adamsen won back-to-back Danish Superliga Player of the Month awards for August and September. On 3 December, he was named Silkeborg's Player of the Year for 2024. On 17 March 2025, Adamsen scored his tenth league goal of the campaign on the final day of the regular season in a 2–2 away draw against Brøndby, which saw Silkeborg finish outside of the top six and go on to play in the relegation round. On 18 May, he scored a brace in Silkeborg's 3–2 away victory over AaB, securing the seventh position for his team and a place in the European play-off match.

On 31 July 2025, Adamsen scored a hat-trick in a 3–2 away victory over KA in the UEFA Conference League second qualifying round, sending Silkeborg to the next round of the qualifying stage with a 4–3 win on aggregate. On 10 August, he scored his second hat-trick of the season in a 4–2 home victory against Nordsjælland in the Superliga. On 3 September, Adamsen scored both goals in a 2–1 away win against Middelfart to send Silkeborg through to the 2025–26 Danish Cup third round.

=== Rapid Wien ===
On 27 May 2026, Austrian Bundesliga club Rapid Wien announced the signing of Adamsen on a two-year deal. He scored his first league goals for the club on 16 August 2026, scoring four goals in a 8–0 win over Grazer AK.

== Career statistics ==
As of match played 6 November 2026

Appearances and goals by club, season and competition
Club	Season	League			National cup (Note: Includes Danish Cup, Austrian Cup)		Europe		Other		Total	
Club	Season	Division	Apps	Goals	Apps	Goals	Apps	Goals	Apps	Goals	Apps	Goals
Frem	2018–19	Danish 2nd Division	28	8	2	2	—		—		30	10
Frem	2019–20	Danish 2nd Division	22	10	2	0	—		—		24	10
Frem	2020–21	Danish 2nd Division	11	4	0	0	—		—		11	4
Frem	Total		61	22	4	2	—		—		65	24
Helsingør	2020–21	Danish 1st Division	12	4	0	0	—		—		12	4
Helsingør	2021–22	Danish 1st Division	32	15	1	0	—		—		33	15
Helsingør	2022–23	Danish 1st Division	1	0	1	2	—		—		2	2
Helsingør	Total		45	19	2	2	—		—		47	21
Silkeborg	2022–23	Danish Superliga	28	10	6	3	7 (Note: One appearance in UEFA Europa League, six appearances and one goal in UEFA Europa Conference League)	1	—		35	13
Silkeborg	2023–24	Danish Superliga	28	5	7	4	—		2 (Note: Appearances in The Atlantic Cup)	2	43	12
Silkeborg	2024–25	Danish Superliga	32	15	6	2	4 (Note: Two appearances and two goals in UEFA Europa League, two appearances and four goals in UEFA Conference League)	6	1 (Note: Appearance in Danish Superliga European play-off match)	0	43	23
Silkeborg	2025–26	Danish Superliga	31	14	2	2	4 (Note: Appearances in UEFA Conference League)	3	—		37	19
Silkeborg	Total		119	44	21	11	15	10	3	2	158	67
Rapid Wien	2026–27	Austrian Bundesliga	12	5	3	2	5	0	—		20	7
Career total			237	90	30	17	20	10	3	2	291	119

== Honours ==
Silkeborg

- Danish Cup: 2023–24
- The Atlantic Cup: 2024

Individual

- Danish Superliga Player of the Month: August 2024, September 2024
- Silkeborg Player of the Year: 2024
- Danish Superliga Team of the Year: 2025–26
