= Joel Felix (footballer) =

Danish footballer (born 1998)

Personal information
- Full name: Joel Rasmus Felix
- Date of birth: 13 January 1998 (age 28)
- Place of birth: Sint Maarten
- Height: 1.90 m (6 ft 3 in)
- Position: Centre-back

Team information
- Current team: Arminia Bielefeld
- Number: 3

Youth career
- Vanløse
- B.93
- Copenhagen

Senior career*
| Years | Team | Apps | (Gls) |
| 2017–2019 | Jong Twente | 34 | (1) |
| 2019–2020 | Næstved | 30 | (1) |
| 2020–2024 | Silkeborg | 72 | (1) |
| 2024– | Arminia Bielefeld | 42 | (3) |

International career
| 2015 | Denmark U-18 | 2 | (0) |
| 2016–2017 | Denmark U-19 | 5 | (0) |
- * Club domestic league appearances and goals as of 18 May 2026

Joel Rasmus Felix (born 13 January 1998) is a Danish professional footballer who plays as a centre-back for 2. Bundesliga club Arminia Bielefeld.

== Career ==
=== Youth years ===
Felix is the son of a Saint Lucian father and Danish mother. He moved to Denmark as a child with his family, and started playing football at Vanløse IF and later at B.93. He later ended up joining F.C. Copenhagen.

=== Senior career ===
Felix sat on the bench for one Danish Superliga game for F.C. Copenhagen in March 2016, but never got his official debut for the club, before he was sold to Dutch club FC Twente on 26 July 2017, where he was going to play for the reserve team, Jong FC Twente. Felix signed a two-year contract with an option for one further year.

After two years in the Netherlands, Felix returned to Denmark in the summer 2019, after signing with Danish 1st Division club Næstved Boldklub. He became a regular starter at the club and played 30 games during his spell at the club, but Næstved ended the season with relegation to the Danish 2nd Division.

On 20 August 2020, Felix signed a four-year deal with Danish 1st Division club Silkeborg IF. He got his debut on 27 September 2020 against FC Fredericia. He made 19 appearances throughout the season and helped Silkeborg with promotion to the 2021-22 Danish Superliga.

On 5 June 2024, Felix joined German 3. Liga club Arminia Bielefeld. He made his debut on 4 August 2024 against FC Energie Cottbus.

== Honours ==
Silkeborg

- Danish Cup: 2023–24

Arminia Bielefeld

- 3. Liga: 2024–25
- DFB-Pokal
  - Runners-up: 2024–25
