= Anders Klynge =

Danish footballer (born 2000)

Personal information
- Full name: Anders Ferslev Klynge
- Date of birth: 14 October 2000 (age 26)
- Place of birth: Odense, Denmark
- Height: 1.75 m (5 ft 9 in)
- Position: Midfielder

Team information
- Current team: Jagiellonia Białystok
- Number: 19

Youth career
- OKS
- OB

Senior career*
Years	Team	Apps	(Gls)
2020	OB	6	(0)
2020–2025	Silkeborg	137	(8)
2025–2026	Bodø/Glimt	15	(1)
2026–	Jagiellonia Białystok	6	(0)
- * Club domestic league appearances and goals as of 18:54, 20 September 2026 (UTC)

Anders Ferslev Klynge (born 14 October 2000) is a Danish professional footballer who plays as a midfielder for Ekstraklasa club Jagiellonia Białystok.

== Career ==
=== OB ===
Klynge started playing football at OKS when he was four years old and later joined OB as a U-15 player.

Klynge got his official and professional debut for OB on 26 June 2020 against Lyngby Boldklub in the Danish Superliga. He started on the bench, but replaced Moses Opondo at halftime. However, he was substituted again in the 90th minute, as he received a yellow card two minutes into his debut. Klynge did also play in the following five league matches.

On 13 July 2020, OB's sporting director confirmed, that Klynge would leave the club at the end of the season, as his contract was expiring.

=== Silkeborg ===
On 3 August 2020, Klynge signed a three-year deal with Danish 1st Division club Silkeborg. He made his debut on 3 September 2020 against St. Restrup IF in the Danish Cup. Klynge helped Silkeborg achieve promotion to the Danish Superliga for the 2020–21 season, playing 30 league games for the club, in which he scored two goals and made six assists.

=== Bodø/Glimt ===
On 12 June 2025, Eliteserien club Bodø/Glimt announced the signing of Klynge on a deal until the summer of 2028. On 16 July, he made his debut for the club in a 1–0 away victory against Fredrikstad in the league.

=== Jagiellonia Białystok ===
On 28 July 2026, Klynge moved to Polish Ekstraklasa club Jagiellonia Białystok on a three-year deal, with an option for a fourth year.

== Career statistics ==
As of match played 20 September 2026

Appearances and goals by club, season and competition
Club	Season	League			National cup (Note: Includes Danish Cup, Norwegian Football Cup)		Europe		Total	
Club	Season	Division	Apps	Goals	Apps	Goals	Apps	Goals	Apps	Goals
OB	2019–20	Danish Superliga	6	0	0	0	—		6	0
Silkeborg	2020–21	Danish 1st Division	30	2	0	0	—		30	2
Silkeborg	2021–22	Danish Superliga	31	2	1	0	—		32	2
Silkeborg	2022–23	Danish Superliga	29	1	4	0	8 (Note: Two appearances in UEFA Europa League, six appearances and two goals in UEFA Conference League)	2	41	3
Silkeborg	2023–24	Danish Superliga	28	2	7	2	—		35	4
Silkeborg	2024–25	Danish Superliga	19	1	3	0	2 (Note: One appearances in UEFA Europa League, one appearances in UEFA Conference League)	0	24	1
Silkeborg	Total		137	8	15	2	10	2	162	12
Bodø/Glimt	2025	Eliteserien	9	0	1	0	4 (Note: Four appearances in UEFA Champions League)	0	14	0
Bodø/Glimt	2026	Eliteserien	6	1	3	0	1 (Note: Appearance in UEFA Champions League)	0	10	1
Bodø/Glimt	Total		15	1	4	0	5	0	24	1
Jagiellonia Białystok	2026–27	Ekstraklasa	6	0	0	0	5 (Note: Appearances in UEFA Europa League)	1	11	1
Career total			164	9	19	2	20	3	203	14

== Honours ==
Silkeborg

- Danish Cup: 2023–24

Bodø/Glimt

- Norwegian Football Cup: 2025–26

Individual

- Superliga Team of the Month: September 2023, October 2023
