= 2023–24 Danish Cup =

70th season of the Danish Cup

Pokalen (The Cup)
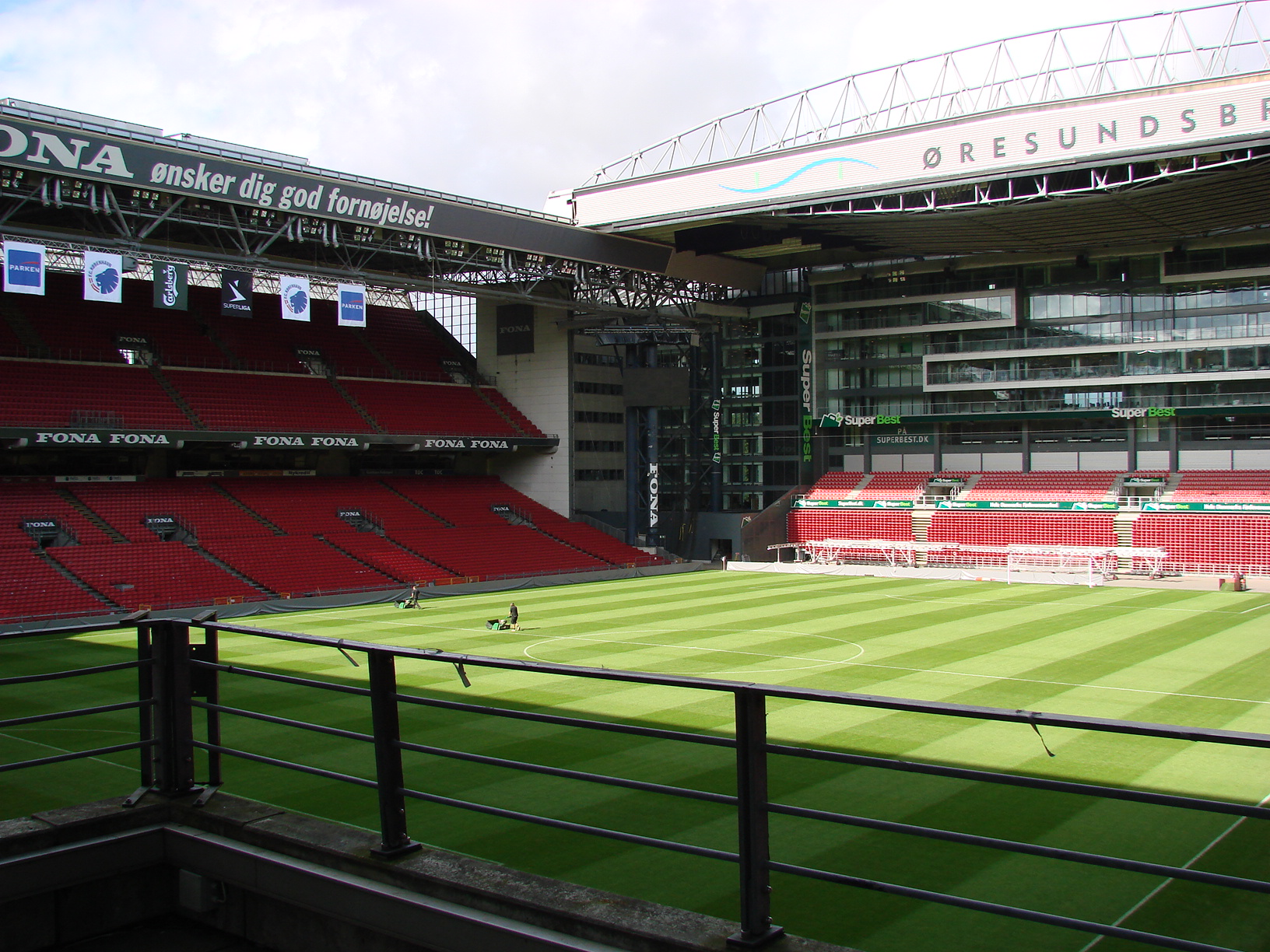
- Parken Stadium hosted the final

Tournament details
- Country: Denmark
- Teams: 104

Final positions
- Champions: Silkeborg (2nd title)
- Runners-up: AGF

Tournament statistics
- Matches played: 109
- Goals scored: 575 (5.28 per match)
- Top goal scorer(s): Jeppe Erenbjerg; Nicklas Røjkjær; Gustav Callø; Ahmad Gero (6 goals each)
- All statistics correct as of 9 May 2024.

The 2023–24 Danish Cup, also known as Oddset Pokalen, was the 70th season of the Danish Cup competition.

The winner of the competition qualified for the second qualifying round of the 2024–25 UEFA Europa League .

Copenhagen were the defending champions, but were eliminated by eventual winners Silkeborg in the quarter-finals.

The final was played at Parken Stadium on 9 May 2024 between Silkeborg and AGF. Silkeborg secured their second title following a 1–0 win, courtesy of Oliver Sonne's first-half goal.

== Structure ==
92 teams participated in the first round, coming from all levels of competition. Six additional teams joined in the second round, while the top six teams from the 2022–23 Danish Superliga entered in the third round.

Round	Date	Number of fixtures	Clubs remaining	New entries this round	Teams entering this round
Qualifying matches	June–July 2023		→ 56		Danmarks serien teams and Teams from Tier 6 to 9
First Round	8–15 August 2023	46	92 → 46	36	12 NordicBetLiga teams 12 2nd Division teams 12 3rd Division teams
Second Round	5–12 September 2023	26	52 → 26	6	6 Superliga teams (7-12)
Third Round	26–28 September 2023	16	32 → 16	6	6 Superliga teams (1-6)
Fourth Round	31 October–2 November 2023	8	16 → 8	None	None
Quarter-Finals	First leg 5–7 December 2023 Second leg 9–11 December 2023	4(8)	8 → 4	None	None
Semi-Finals	First leg 9–11 April 2024 Second leg 23–25 April 2024	2(4)	4 → 2	None	None
Final	9 May 2024	1	2 → 1	None	None

== Participants ==
104 teams will compete for the Danish Cup. All teams from the top three divisions in 2022–23 were automatically entered, while 54 teams from lower division teams qualified through qualifying matches to enter the competition proper.

== First round ==
In the first round of the tournament, 92 teams took part, including 56 clubs from the various levels of the Denmark Series and below, all teams from 2022-23 Danish 3rd Division and 2022-23 Danish 2nd Division, the 3rd-12th placed teams from the 2022-23 Danish 1st Division and the 11th-12th placed teams from the 2022-23 Danish Superliga. Teams are split into three regions:

- Zealand/Bornholm/Falster/Lolland
- Fyn/Southern Jutland
- Middle/Northern Jutland

Number of teams per tier still in competition
3F Superliga (tier 1)	NordicBet Liga (tier 2)	2. Division; (tier 3)	3. Division; (tier 4)	Danmarksserien (tier 5)	Regional-series (tier 6)	Serie 1, 2 & 3 (tier 7, 8 & 9)	Total
12 / 12	12 / 12	12 / 12	10 / 10	24 / 24	20 / 20	14 / 14	104 / 104

=== Zealand/Bornholm/Falster/Lolland ===
5 August 2023	NB Bornholm (6)	1–3	Bagsværd BK (6)	Nexø Stadium
14:15	Olsen 41'	Report	Jørgensen 67', 70'	Referee: Patrick Stenzel Rasmussen

8 August 2023	Amager FF (8)	2–3 (a.e.t.)	IF Skjold Birkerød (6)	Kastrup IA ved diget
18:00	Schjølin 38' 41'; Petersen		Nielsen 9'; Bennett-Larsen 18', 111'	Referee: Sebastian Friis Aagerup

8 August 2023	LUIF (7)	0–16	B93 (2)	LUIF's Anlæg
18:00			Isaki 10' 25'; Bustamante 16'; Clemmensen 22' 43' 54'; Fredericksen 26' 81'; Mathys 28' 44' 52'; Søe 32'; Minerba 62'; Mouritz 74'; Erenbjerg 76'; Ogude 78'	Referee: Benjamin Helm Svedborg

8 August 2023	HIK (3)	2–1	Fremad Amager (3)	Gentofte Sports Park
18:00	F. Andersen 68'; Veltz 90+5'		Huzaifa 74'	Referee: Anders Skjodt Voergaard

8 August 2023	Greve (5)	1–2	Nykøbing FC (3)	Greve Idræts Center
18:00	Pedersen 69'		Nnamani 59' 72'	Referee: Jesper Nielsen

8 August 2023	Taastrup FC (6)	3–2	Glostrup (5)	Tåstrup Idrætspark
18:00

8 August 2023	Allerød FK (5)	0–2	Vanløse (4)	Allerød Idrædtspark
18:00

8 August 2023	BSF (5)	1–8	Hillerød Fodbold (2)	Ballerup Idrætspark
18:00

8 August 2023	Tårnby FF (5)	1–3	HB Køge (2)	Vestamager Idrætspark
18:00

8 August 2023	Dragør BK (7)	0–4	FC Helsingør (2)	Dragør
18:00

8 August 2023	Bispebjerg BK (7)	1–4	Ringsted IF (6)	Lersøparken
18:30

8 August 2023	KFUM Roskilde (5)	1–4	Brønshøj BK (5)	Lillevang Idrædtscenter
18:30

8 August 2023	Gørslev IF (5)	2–0	B.1960 (5)	Gørslev Stadion
18:30

8 August 2023	FC Nakskov (6)	1–8	FA2000 (3)	OK+ Stadion
19:00

8 August 2023	B1908 (5)	1–0	FC Roskilde (3)	Sundby Idrætspark
19:00

8 August 2023	Frederiksholm Sydhavnen (7)	0–4	Skjold (5)	Valby Idrætspark
18:00

9 August 2023	Ledøje-Smørum (5)	1–2	AB (3)	Smørum Idrætscenter
18:00

9 August 2023	Køge Union (9)	0–2	AB Tårnby (5)	Ellemarkens baner
18:00

9 August 2023	Vallensbæk IF (8)	0–6	Ishøj IF (4)	Vallensbæk Idrætscenter
18:00

9 August 2023	Frem (4)	0–1	Næstved BK (2)	Valby Idrætspark
19:00

10 August 2023	Tune IF (6)	4–1	B Frem (6)	Tune Stadium
18:00

=== Fyn/Southern Jutland ===
8 August 2023	Dalum IF (6)	3–1	OKS (5)	Rema1000 Park, Dalum
18:00

8 August 2023	Kolding B (6)	4–0	Varde IF (5)	Mosevej Sportsplads
18:00

8 August 2023	KFUM Odense (7)	0–6	Middelfart Boldklub (3)	KFUM parken, Odense
18:00

8 August 2023	B1909 (5)	2–2 (a.e.t.) (4–5 p)	Fjordager IF (5)	3F Gillested Park
18:00

8 August 2023	FC Avrasya (8)	1–19	Kolding IF (2)	Odense Atletikstadion
18:45

9 August 2023	Morud-Veflinge (6)	1–5	Næsby BK (4)	MORUD VVS-EL Stadium
18:00

9 August 2023	Otterup B&IK (6)	2–4	SfB-Oure FA (4)	Intersport Arena Otterup
18:00

9 August 2023	AC Horsens (2)	1–2	Sønderjyske Fodbold (2)	Nordstren Arena Horsen
18:00

9 August 2023	KRFK (7)	1–8	Esbjerg FB (3)	Krogsbølle stadium
18:30

10 August 2023	Tåsinge fB (7)	1–2	Aabenraa BK (7)	SEF energi Arena
18:00

15 August 2023	Bredballe IF (6)	0–8	FC Fredericia (2)	BAUHAUS Park
18:00			Holvad 5' 31'; Røjkjær 8' 38' 45'; Dall 43'; Juhl 52'; Simonsen 53'	Referee: Mads-Kristoffer Kristoffersen

=== Middle/Northern Jutland ===
8 August 2023	Odder (5)	0–1	Skive IK (3)	Spektrum Odder
18:00

8 August 2023	Viby IF (5)	5–2	Holstebro BK (4)	Viby Idrædstpark
18:30

8 August 2023	Højslev IF (7)	1–6	VRI (5)	Højslev Stadion
18:30

8 August 2023	Ringkøbing IF (5)	1–0	Kjellerup IF (5)	Green Arena
19:00

8 August 2023	ASA Fodbold (6)	2–4	IF Lyseng (4)	Koncenton Park
19:00

8 August 2023	Thisted FC (3)	4–3	Brabrand IF (3)	Sparkassen Thy Arena
19:00

9 August 2023	Nibe BK (8)	v	w/o (5)	N/A
00:00				Attendance: N/A; Referee: N/A

9 August 2023	Jetsmark IF (6)	2–3	VSK Aarhus (4)	Sparkassen Danmark Arena
18:00

9 August 2023	tst Fodbold (6)	2–2 (a.e.t.) (3–1 p)	Vejgaard BK (4)	Tilst Idrætsanlæg
18:00

9 August 2023	Søften GF (6)	3–2	Gug BK (6)	Søften Idrætsanlæg
18:00

10 August 2023	Young Boys FD (4)	2–1	Vendsyssel FF (2)	JYSK Park
18:00

10 August 2023	Aarhus 1900 (6)	0–3	Hobro IK (2)	Fort Langenæs
1800

15 August 2023	Egen UI (6)	0–8	AaB (2)	Guderup Idrætsanlæg
17:00		Report	Prica 15' 46' 71' 87'; Pedersen 30'; Prip 37' 49'; Widell 75'	Attendance: 1,720; Referee: Jørgen Daugberg Burchardt

15 August 2023	Nørresundby BK (5)	1–7	Aarhus Fremad (3)	Nordjysk Bank Arena
18:00

== Second round ==
There were 52 teams:

- 46 teams from the 1st round

New entries:

- 4 teams from the 2022–23 Danish Superliga (7th–10th placed)
- 2 teams from the 2022–23 Danish 1st Division (1st and 2nd placed)

Number of teams per tier still in competition
3F Superliga (tier 1)	NordicBet Liga (tier 2)	2. Division; (tier 3)	3. Division; (tier 4)	Danmarksserien (tier 5)	Regional-series (tier 6)	Serie 1, 2 & 3 (tier 7, 8 & 9)	Total
12 / 12	10 / 12	9 / 12	7 / 10	9 / 24	9 / 20	2 / 14	58 / 104

=== East ===
5 September 2023	IF Skjold Birkerød (6)	0–2	Vanløse (4)	Birkerød Stadium
17:00			Pedersen 66'; Fenwick 88'

5 September 2023	Taastrup FC (6)	0–5	FA2000 (3)	Tåstrup Idrætspark
17:00			Jalal 10'; Toftdahl 21', 40'; Elsayed 90+1', 90+4'

5 September 2023	Gørslev IF (5)	1–2	Ishøj IF (4)	Gørslev Stadium
17:00

5 September 2023	SfB-Oure FA (4)	3–4 (a.e.t.)	AB Gladsaxe (3)	Høje Bøge Stadium
17:00

5 September 2023	Brønshøj BK (5)	0–5	B93 (2)	Tingbjerg Idrætspark
18:30			Erenbjerg 31', 42' (pen.), 45+2'; Clemmensen 50'; Mathys 64'

5 September 2023	B1908 (5)	1–2 (a.e.t.)	HIK (3)	Sundby Idrætspark
19:00

6 September 2023	Fjordager IF (5)	0–8	Hvidovre (1)	Fjordager idrætsanlæg
17:00			Makienok 19' Papuga 31'; Jakobsen 35' report =

6 September 2023	Skjold (5)	2–5	FC Helsingør (2)	Østerbro Stadium
18:00	Fink-Jensen 65'; Lykke 67'		Christensen 6', 73'; Drost 17', 59'; Lindén 89'

6 September 2023	Hillerød Fodbold (2)	0–2	Lyngby (1)	Hillerød Stadium
18:00			Gytkjær 78' 83' (pen.)

6 September 2023	AB Tårnby (5)	0–2	Nykøbing FC (3)	Tårnby Stadium
19:00			Nyman 10'; Nnamani 81'	Referee: Jonas Hansen

7 September 2023	Tune IF (6)	0–5	OB (1)	Tune Idræts center
17:00			Turay 19'; Owusu 66'; Al Haff 67'; Selvén 69'; Mouritsen 79'	Referee: Benjamin Helm Svedborg

7 September 2023	Bagsværd BK (6)	0–7	Næstved BK (2)	Bagsværd Stadium
17:00			Mikkelsen 15', 23', 51'; Harslund 27' (o.g.); Dhaflaoui 66'; Ladefoged 68'; Ellegaard 78'	Referee: Mathias Lykke

7 September 2023	Ringsted IF (6)	1–3 (a.e.t.)	HB Køge (2)	Ringsted Stadium
17:00	Jensen 65'		Madsen 13'; Dorgu 94'; Semovski 117'	Referee: Frida Nielsen

=== West ===
5 September 2023	Nibe BK (8)	1–2	Esbjerg FB (3)	Nibe Stadion
17:00	Rasmussen 15'		Bytyqi 13'; Lausen 78'	Referee: Mikkel Redder

5 September 2023	Skive IK (3)	1–3	Thisted FC (3)	Hancock Arena
19:00	Yao 75'		Gero 27', 39'; Andreasen 80'	Referee: Patrick Remon Gammelholm

6 September 2023	Aabenraa BK (7)	0–13	Midtjylland (1)	Aabenraa Stadion
17:00			Rømer 8'; Gabriel 9'; Iheanacho 35' 43' 53' 65'; Brynhildsen 37'; Marrony 40'; Pedersen 59' (o.g.); Fossum 66'; Voldby 76'; Charles 83' 90'	Referee: Mads-Kristoffer Kristoffersen

6 September 2023	Dalum IF (6)	1–8	FC Fredericia (2)	Dalum Stadion
17:00	Mikkslesen 90'		Gertsen 2'; Dall 20', 38'; Jessen 25'; Røjkjær 28', 51'; Berger 61'; Christensen 73'	Referee: Jonas Bøgelund

6 September 2023	IF Lyseng (4)	3–1	Middelfart BK (3)	Lyseng Idrætscenter
17:00

6 September 2023	Viby IF (5)	2–0	VSK Aarhus (4)	Viby Idrætspark
17:00

6 September 2023	Ringkøbing IF (5)	0–4	Kolding IF (2)	Green Arena
18:00			Kudsk 18'; Mikkelsen 48'; Iversen 79'; Palm 83'

6 September 2023	VRI (5)	0–6	AaB (2)	NES Park
18:30

6 September 2023	Kolding B (6)	0–2	Hobro IK (2)	Mosevej Sportsplads
19:00

6 September 2023	Sønderjyske (2)	0–1	Vejle (1)	Sydbank Park
20:00

7 September 2023	Søften GF (6)	1–8	Aarhus Fremad (3)	Søften Idrætsanlæg
17:00

12 September 2023	tst Fodbold (6)	3–2	Næsby BK (4)	Tilst Idrætsanlæg
17:00

12 September 2023	Young Boys FD (4)	0–1	Silkeborg (1)	Søholt Idrætsanlæg
18:30

== Third round ==
There were 32 teams:

- 26 teams from the 2nd round

New entires

- 6 teams from the 2022–23 Danish Superliga (1st–6th placed)

Number of teams per tier still in competition
3F Superliga (tier 1)	NordicBet Liga (tier 2)	2. Division; (tier 3)	3. Division; (tier 4)	Denmark series (tier 5)	Regional-series (tier 6)	Serie 1, 2 & 3 (tier 7, 8 & 9)	Total
12 / 12	8 / 12	7 / 12	3 / 10	1 / 24	1 / 20	0 / 14	32 / 104

26 September 2023	tst Fodbold (6)	0–7	Vejle (1)	Vejle Stadion
18:00		Report	N'Gbakoto 10', 45'; Assehnoun 21', 72'; Kirkegaard 50'; Juwara 66'; Lauritsen 77'	Referee: Jakob Kehlet

26 September 2023	HB Køge (2)	2–4 (a.e.t.)	Lyngby (1)	Køge Idrætspark
18:00	Seehusen 23'; Gudmann 90'	Report	Guðjohnsen 49', 95'; Corlu 55'; Gregor 111'	Referee: Sebastian Aagerup

26 September 2023	AaB (2)	2–3	Fredericia (2)	Aalborg Stadium
18:00	Widell 47'; Caballo 80'		Simonsen 26'; Jakobsen 83'; Bach 66'	Referee: Michael Rasmussen

26 September 2023	Vanløse (4)	1–3 (a.e.t.)	Ishøj IF (4)	Vanløse Idrætspark
19:00	Nøhr 33'		Azaquoun 29'; Bagou 96'; Warlo 103'	Referee: Jesper Nielsen

26 September 2023	FA2000 (3)	2–3 (a.e.t.)	AB Gladsaxe (3)	Frederiksberg Idrætspark
19:30	Toftdahl 10' (pen.); Derrar 40'		Namli 92'; Ndukwu 73'; Wagner 76'	Referee: Mathias Lykke

27 September 2023	Aarhus Fremad (3)	1–2	Helsingør (2)	Riisvangen Stadium
16:00	From 77' (pen.)		Drost 29'; Hasani 47'	Referee: Jacob Stausgaard Kobberrød

27 September 2023	Hobro IK (2)	0–1	OB (1)	Hobro Stadium
18:00			Turay 23'	Referee: Morten Krogh

27 September 2023	Næstved BK (2)	0–2	FC Midtjylland (1)	Næstved Stadium
18:00			Charles 8'; Djú 90+2'	Referee: Jonas Hansen

27 September 2023	B93 (2)	4–4 (a.e.t.) (3–5 p)	Randers (1)	Østerbro Stadium
18:00	Erenbjerg 1', 40'; Bustamante 45'; Kroner 117'		Agyiri 20'; Kamara 47'; Bundgaard 52' (pen.); Nordli 101'	Referee: Jacob Karlsen
	Penalties
	Mourtiz (penalty scored); Heimer (penalty scored); Mathys (penalty missed); Erenbjerg (penalty scored)		(penalty scored) Albæk; (penalty scored) Nordli; (penalty scored) Pedersen; (penalty scored) Dammers; (penalty scored) Kopplin

27 September 2023	HIK (3)	0–3	Brøndby (1)	Brøndby Stadium
18:00			Suzuki 19'; Schwartau 21'; Ogura 63' (o.g.)	Referee: Jorgen Daugberg Burchardt

27 September 2023	Thisted FC (3)	1–3	Silkeborg IF (1)	Sparekassen Thy Arena
19:00	Gero 18'		Salquist 19'; Tengstedt 22', 42'	Referee: Lasse Label Graagaard

27 September 2023	Esbjerg FB (3)	3–4	Viborg FF (1)	Blue Water Arena
19:00	Jørgensen 51' (Jonsson); Sørensen 64' (Holten); Holten 70'		Ementa 39' (Mbom); Bonde; Grønning 80' (Kuzmić); Thomas 90+3'	Referee: Sandi Putros

27 September 2023	IF Lyseng (4)	0–9	Copenhagen (1)	Lyseng Idrætscenter, Højbjerg
19:45			Sahsah 3'; Elyounoussi 12'; Óskarsson 14', 20'; Bardghji 28'; Lerager 79', 84'; Froholdt 90'; Vavro 90+5'	Referee: Aydin Uslu

28 September 2023	Kolding IF (2)	2–2 (a.e.t.) (2–3 p)	Nordsjælland (1)	Kolding Stadium
18:00	Beck 46'; Tånnander 54'		Nygren 48'; Frese 71'	Referee: Mikkel Redder
	Penalties
	Kudsk (penalty scored); Denius (penalty missed); Mikkselsen (penalty scored); Nørager (penalty missed); Ngongo (penalty missed)		(penalty missed) Ingvartsen; (penalty scored) Nagalo; (penalty scored) Nygren; (penalty scored) Schjelderup

28 September 2023	Nykøbing FC (3)	0–1	AGF (1)	Lollands Bank Park
19:00			Kahl; Beijmo 64'	Referee: Simon Rasmussen

4 October 2023	Viby IF (5)	0–2	Hvidovre IF (1)	Viby Idrætspark
16:00			Smed 56'; Andreasen 83'	Referee: Mads-Kristoffer Kristoffersen

== Round of 16 ==
There were 16 teams. The draw was held on 28 September 2023.

Number of teams per tier still in competition
3F Superliga (tier 1)	NordicBet Liga (tier 2)	2. Division; (tier 3)	3. Division; (tier 4)	Denmark series (tier 5)	Regional-series (tier 6)	Serie 1, 2 & 3 (tier 7, 8 & 9)	Total
12 / 12	2 / 12	1 / 12	1 / 10	0 / 24	0 / 20	0 / 14	16 / 104

31 October 2023	Helsingør (2)	2–2 (a.e.t.) (4–5 p)	Lyngby (1)	Helsingør Stadium
18:00	Johansson 29'; M. Christensen 86'		Sigurðsson 31' (pen.), 45'	Referee: Jakob A. Sundberg
	Penalties
	Brems (penalty scored); F. Christensen (penalty scored); Lindén (penalty scored); M. Christensen (penalty missed); Drost (penalty scored)		(penalty scored) Magnússon; (penalty scored) Gregor; (penalty scored) Winther; (penalty scored) Finnsson; (penalty scored) Rømer

31 October 2023	Copenhagen (1)	1–0	Midtjylland (1)	Parken
20:15	Bardghji 77'			Referee: Morten Krogh

1 November 2023	Hvidovre (1)	1–5	Silkeborg (1)	Pro Ventilation Park
18:00	Makienok 70'		McCowatt 3' 31'; Sonne 49' (Felix); Adamsen 71' (Carlsen); Boesen 81'	Referee: Sandi Putros

1 November 2023	Viborg (1)	2–3	Nordsjælland (1)	Viborg Stadium
18:00	Grønning 31'; Søndergaard 64'		Rasmussen 45+1', 54', 57'	Referee: Mads-Kristoffer Kristoffersen

1 November 2023	AB Gladsaxe (3)	1–1 (a.e.t.) (3–2 p)	Vejle (1)	Gladsaxe Stadium
19:00	Gomez 16'		Freriks 77' (o.g.)	Referee: Jakob Kehlet
	Penalties
	Walatee (penalty missed); Ilsøe (penalty scored); Wagner (penalty missed); Garly (penalty scored); Sighaoui (penalty scored)		(penalty scored) Velkov; (penalty missed) Arsić; (penalty missed) Rólantsson; (penalty scored) Juwara; (penalty missed) Eskildsen

1 November 2023	Fredericia (2)	3–1	OB (1)	Monjasa Park
20:00	Røjkjær 8'; Jakobsen 28'; Bach 52'		Owusu 90+4'	Referee: Jacob Karlsen

2 November 2023	Ishøj (4)	0–4	AGF (1)	Ishøj Idrætscenter
18:00			Anderson 73'; Beijmo 46'; Sauer 72', 90'	Referee: Lasse Label Graagaard

2 November 2023	Randers (1)	0–1	Brøndby (1)	Cepheus Park Randers
20:00			Suzuki 20'	Referee: Jorgen Daugberg Burchardt

== Quarter-finals ==
There were 8 teams from the 4th round (winners) playing two legs:

Number of teams per tier still in competition
3F Superliga (tier 1)	NordicBet Liga (tier 2)	2. Division; (tier 3)	3. Division; (tier 4)	Denmark series (tier 5)	Regional series (tier 6)	1, 2 & 3 series (tier 7, 8 & 9 )	Total
6 / 12	1 / 12	1 / 12	0 / 12	0 / 12	0 / 12	0 / 12	8 / 104

6 December 2023	Copenhagen (1)	0–2	Silkeborg (1)	Copenhagen
20:15			McCowatt 43'; Klynge 64'	Stadium: Parken; Attendance: 14,290; Referee: Jens Maae

9 December 2023	Silkeborg (1)	1–2 (3–2 agg.)	Copenhagen (1)	Silkeborg
19:00	Klynge (69])	Report	Østrøm 36' (o.g.); Sørensen 45+2'	Stadium: JYSK Park; Referee: Jakob Kehlet

6 December 2023	Nordsjælland (1)	3–0	AB Gladsaxe (3)	Farum
	Harder 48' 86'; Osman 70'			Stadium: Right to Dream Park; Attendance: 1,900; Referee: Jonas Hansen

9 December 2023	AB Gladsaxe (3)	1–2 (1–5 agg.)	Nordsjælland (1)	Gladsaxe
	Freriks 88'		Barslund 24'; Svensson 34' (pen.)	Stadium: Gladsaxe Stadium; Referee: Aydin Uslu

7 December 2023	AGF (1)	2–0	Brøndby (1)	Aarhus
	Serra 42'; Tingager 65'			Stadium: Ceres Park; Attendance: 9,869; Referee: Peter Kjærsgaard-Andersen

10 December 2023	Brøndby (1)	2–1 (2–3 agg.)	AGF (1)	Brøndbyvester
	Kvistgaarden 25', 43'		Mortensen 49'	Stadium: Brøndby Stadium; Referee: Morten Krogh

7 December 2023	Fredericia (2)	3–2	Lyngby (1)	Fredericia
	Bach 19'; Berger 27'; Marcussen 40'		Magnússon 45+2'; Gytkjær 70'	Stadium: Monjasa Park; Referee: Mads-Kristoffer Kristoffersen

10 December 2023	Lyngby (1)	0–1 (2–4 agg.)	Fredericia (2)	Lyngby
			Marcussen 10'	Stadium: Lyngby Stadion; Referee: Jacob Karsen

== Semi-finals ==
There were 4 teams from the Quarter-finals playing two legs:

Number of teams per tier still in competition
3F Superliga (tier 1)	NordicBet Liga (tier 2)	2. Division; (tier 3)	3. Division; (tier 4)	Denmark series (tier 5)	Regional series (tier 6)	1, 2 & 3 series (tier 7, 8 & 9 )	Total
3 / 12	1 / 12	0 / 12	0 / 12	0 / 12	0 / 12	0 / 12	4 / 104

29 March 2024	Silkeborg (1)	6–1	Fredericia (2)	Silkeborg
19:00	Þórðarson 15', 24'; Adamsen 19', 63' (pen.); 69' (pen.); Mattsson 49'	Report	Carstensen 52'	Stadium: JYSK Park; Referee: Jakob Kehlet

11 April 2024	Fredericia (2)	2–0 (3–6 agg.)	Silkeborg (1)	Fredericia
18:00	Carstensen 7', 26'	Report		Stadium: Monjasa Park; Referee: Mads-Kristoffer Kristoffersen

29 March 2024	Nordsjælland (1)	2–3	AGF (1)	Farum
18:00	Osman 44'; Schjelderup 61'	Report	Links 33'; Bech 45+2'; Tingager 79'	Stadium: Right to Dream Park; Referee: Jens Maae

11 April 2024	AGF (1)	1–0 (4–2 agg.)	Nordsjælland (1)	Aarhus
20:00	Links 90+2'	Report		Stadium: Ceres Park; Referee: Morten Krogh

== Final ==
The winner qualified for the second qualifying round of 2024–25 Europa League.

9 May 2024	Silkeborg (1)	1–0	AGF (1)	Copenhagen
17:00	Sonne 38'			Stadium: Parken; Attendance: 36,300; Referee: Mikkel Redder
