= JYSK Park =

Football stadium in Silkeborg, Denmark

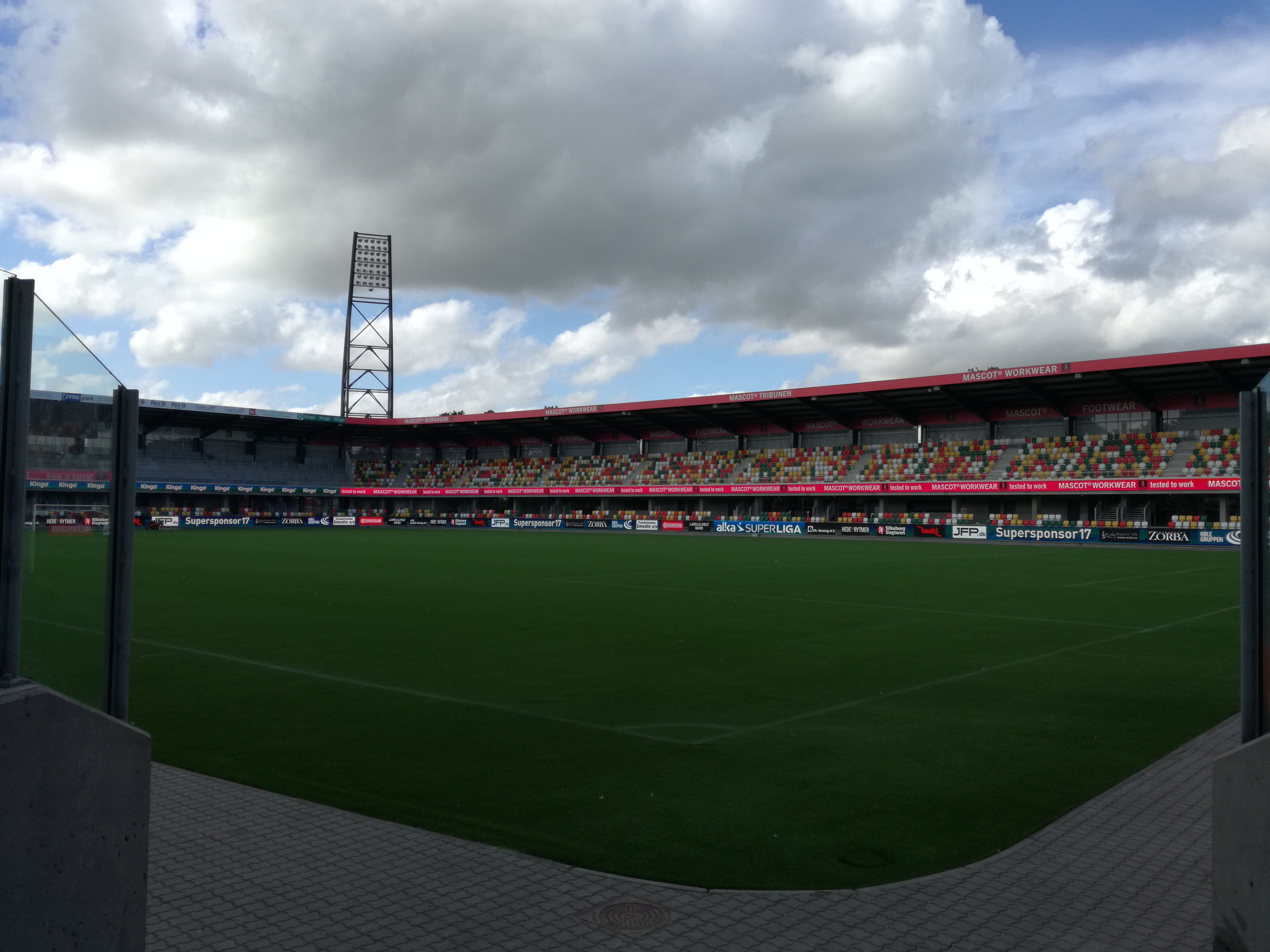
- Interactive map of JYSK Park
- Location: Silkeborg, Denmark
- Coordinates: 56°11′03″N 9°34′32″E
- Owner: Silkeborg Municipality
- Operator: Silkeborg IF
- Capacity: 10,000 (6,000 seats)
- Surface: Artificial Turf
- Record attendance: 9,411

Construction
- Groundbreaking: 2015
- Opened: 31 July 2017
- Cost: 130,000,000 DKK (17,470,300 €)
- Architect: Årstiderne Arkitekter

Tenants
- Silkeborg IF (2017–present); Young Boys FD (2021–present)

JYSK Park is a football stadium in Silkeborg, Denmark. The stadium is home to Silkeborg IF and Young Boys FD and has capacity for 10,000 spectators. The construction of JYSK Park began in 2015 and was completed in the summer of 2017. It was opened on July 31, 2017 for a match between Silkeborg IF and AGF, where the home team won 2–1 in front of 9,411 fans. Silkeborg IF’s Gustaf Nilsson became the first goal scorer in the stadium in a 2–1 win over AGF.

The stadium is located in Søhøjlandet next to the JYSK Arena. The construction of the stadium was a collaboration between Silkeborg IF ownership and Silkeborg Municipality, with an estimated cost of 130 Million kroner. The municipality funded 60 million of the construction with the club contributing the remaining 70 million.

The track at JYSK Park consists of artificial turf.

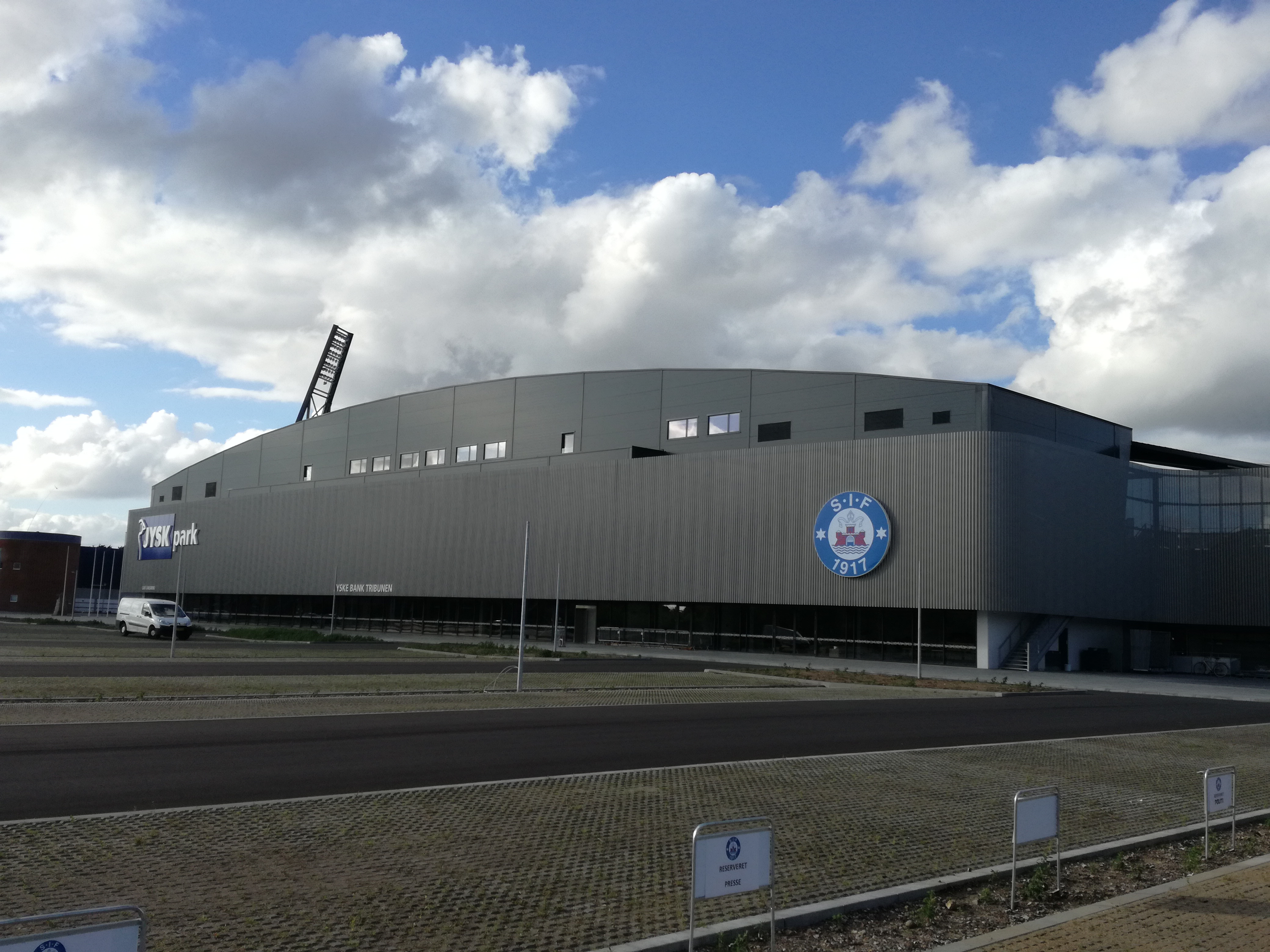
External view of the Stadium
