= 2023 UEFA European Under-19 Championship qualification =

Tournament details
- Dates: Qualifying round: 21 September – 23 November 2022; Elite round: 22 – 28 March 2023
- Teams: 54 (from 1 confederation)

Tournament statistics
- Matches played: 117
- Goals scored: 353 (3.02 per match)
- Top scorer(s): (Luxembourg) Leon Elshan (Iceland) Orri Óskarsson (6 goals each)

The 2023 UEFA European Under-19 Championship qualifying competition was a men's under-19 football competition that determined the seven teams joining the automatically qualified hosts Malta in the 2023 UEFA European Under-19 Championship final tournament. Players born on or after 1 January 2004 were eligible to participate.

Russia were originally scheduled to participate in the competition before being excluded due to the ongoing invasion of Ukraine, while Liechtenstein opted not to participate. This meant that the tournament featured 52 of the remaining 54 UEFA member association national teams. Qualification consisted of a qualifying round in autumn 2022 followed by an elite round in spring 2023.

== Format ==
The qualifying competition consisted of the following two rounds:

- Qualifying Round: Apart from Portugal, which received a bye to the elite round as the team with the highest seeding coefficient, the remaining 51 teams were drawn in twelve groups of four teams and one group of three teams. Each group was played in single round-robin format at one of the teams selected as hosts after the draw. The thirteen group winners, thirteen runners-up, and the third placed team with the best record against the first and second-placed teams in their group advanced to the elite round.
- Elite Round: The 28 teams were drawn into seven groups of four teams. Each group was played in single round-robin format at one of the teams selected as hosts after the draw. The seven group winners qualified for the final tournament.

The schedule of each group was as follows, with two rest days between each matchday (Regulations Article 20.04):

Group Schedule

Matchday	Matches
Matchday 1	1 v 4, 3 v 2
Matchday 2	1 v 3, 2 v 4
Matchday 3	2 v 1, 4 v 3

=== Tiebreakers ===
In the qualifying and elite round, teams were ranked according to points (3 points for a win, 1 point for a draw, 0 points for a loss), and if tied on points, the following tiebreaking criteria were applied, in the order given, to determine the rankings (Regulations Articles 14.01 and 14.02):

1. Points in head-to-head matches among tied teams
2. Goal difference in head-to-head matches among tied teams
3. Goals scored in head-to-head matches among tied teams
4. If more than two teams were tied, and after applying all head-to-head criteria above, a subset of teams were still tied, all head-to-head criteria above were reapplied exclusively to this subset of teams:
5. Goal difference in all group matches
6. Goals scored in all group matches
7. Penalty shoot-out if only two teams had the same number of points, and they met in the last round of the group and were tied after applying all criteria above (not used if more than two teams had the same number of points, or if their rankings were not relevant for qualification for the next stage)
8. Disciplinary points (red card = 3 points, yellow card = 1 point, expulsion for 2 yellow cards in one match = 3 points)
9. UEFA coefficient ranking for the qualifying round draw

To determine the best third-placed team from the qualifying round, the results against the teams in fourth place were discarded. The following criteria were applied (Regulations Articles 15.01 and 15.02):

1. Points
2. Goal difference
3. Goals scored
4. Disciplinary points (total 3 matches)
5. UEFA coefficient ranking for the qualifying round draw

== Qualifying round ==
=== Draw ===
The draw for the qualifying round was held on 8 December 2021, at the UEFA headquarters in Nyon, Switzerland.

The teams were seeded according to their coefficient ranking, calculated based on the following:

- 2016 UEFA European Under-19 Championship final tournament and qualifying competition (qualifying round and elite round)
- 2017 UEFA European Under-19 Championship final tournament and qualifying competition (qualifying round and elite round)
- 2018 UEFA European Under-19 Championship final tournament and qualifying competition (qualifying round and elite round)
- 2019 UEFA European Under-19 Championship final tournament and qualifying competition (qualifying round and elite round)

Each group contained one team from Pot A, one team from Pot B, one team from Pot C, and one team from Pot D. Based on the decisions taken by the UEFA Emergency Panel, the following pairs of teams could not be drawn in the same group: Spain and Gibraltar, Ukraine and Russia, Serbia and Kosovo, Russia and Kosovo, Bosnia and Herzegovina and Kosovo, Azerbaijan and Armenia.

Final tournament hosts: Team / Coeff. / Rank; **Malta** / 2.333 / —	Bye to elite round: Team / Coeff. / Rank; **Portugal** / 29.389 / 1

Teams entering qualifying round

Pot A
Team	Coeff.	Rank
**France**	23.778	2
**England**	23.000	3
**Italy**	21.889	4
Netherlands	16.778	5
**Czech Republic**	16.722	6
**Spain**	16.222	7
**Germany**	15.833	8
**Ukraine**	14.389	9
**Republic of Ireland**	13.278	10
**Norway**	12.611	11
**Turkey**	12.611	12
Austria	11.833	13
**Croatia**	11.611	14

Pot B
Team	Coeff.	Rank
**Greece**	11.000	15
**Belgium**	10.667	16
**Sweden**	10.278	17
**Serbia**	10.167	18
**Slovakia**	10.167	19
**Poland**	10.167	20
Scotland	9.833	21
**Israel**	9.833	22
Bulgaria	9.722	23
**Hungary**	9.167	24
**Romania**	8.833	25
**Denmark**	8.833	26
**Slovenia**	8.167	27

Pot C
Team	Coeff.	Rank
Georgia	7.833	28
Russia	7.333	29
Finland	7.333	30
Switzerland	7.000	31
Bosnia and Herzegovina	6.667	32
Cyprus	5.333	33
Wales	5.000	34
**Latvia**	4.667	35
**Iceland**	4.667	36
Azerbaijan	4.500	37
North Macedonia	4.333	38
**Northern Ireland**	4.333	39
Belarus	4.333	40

Pot D
Team	Coeff.	Rank
Armenia	3.667	41
Montenegro	3.333	42
Kosovo	3.167	43
Albania	2.000	44
Kazakhstan	1.667	45
Andorra	1.667	46
**Luxembourg**	1.667	47
Moldova	1.333	48
**Estonia**	1.333	49
Faroe Islands	1.333	50
Lithuania	1.000	51
Gibraltar	0.333	52
San Marino	0.000	53

Notes

- Teams marked in **bold** qualified for the final tournament.

Did not enter
Liechtenstein

=== Groups ===
==== Group 1 ====
Pos	Team	Pld	W	D	L	GF	GA	GD	Pts	Qualification
1	Greece	3	2	1	0	6	1	+5	**7**	Elite round
2	Czech Republic	3	2	1	0	7	3	+4	**7**	Elite round
3	Switzerland (H)	3	1	0	2	4	5	−1	**3**	
4	Andorra	3	0	0	3	0	8	−8	**0**	

Source: UEFA
Rules for classification: Tiebreakers
(H) Hosts
21 September 2022
14:00

Czech Republic	3–0	Andorra
Mašek 25'; Beran 55'; Kubr 64'	Report

Stade des Arbères, Meyrin
Referee: Amine Kourgheli (Belarus)
21 September 2022
18:30

Switzerland	0–2	Greece
	Report	Spyrakos 20'; Koutsias 84'

Colovray Sports Centre, Nyon
Referee: Henrik Nalbandyan (Armenia)

24 September 2022
14:00

Greece	3–0	Andorra
Tsikos 9'; Koutsias 36'; Kyriopoulos 75'	Report

Stade des Arbères, Meyrin
Referee: Sandi Putros (Denmark)
24 September 2022
18:30

Czech Republic	3–2	Switzerland
Šmiga 15'; Ševínský 27'; Mašek 29'	Report	Toggenburger 71', 84'

Colovray Sports Centre, Nyon
Referee: Amine Kourgheli (Belarus)

27 September 2022
18:30

Greece	1–1	Czech Republic
Spyrakos 75'	Report	Šmiga 64'

Stade des Arbères, Meyrin
Referee: Henrik Nalbandyan (Armenia)
27 September 2022
18:30

Andorra	0–2	Switzerland
	Report	Crescenti 34'; Gebreyesus 72'

Colovray Sports Centre, Nyon
Referee: Sandi Putros (Denmark)

==== Group 2 ====
Pos	Team	Pld	W	D	L	GF	GA	GD	Pts	Qualification
1	Turkey	3	1	2	0	10	6	+4	**5**	Elite round
2	Luxembourg	3	1	2	0	5	4	+1	**5**	Elite round
3	Bulgaria (H)	3	1	2	0	2	1	+1	**5**	
4	Azerbaijan	3	0	0	3	1	7	−6	**0**	

Source: UEFA
Rules for classification: Tiebreakers
(H) Hosts
21 September 2022
12:00 (13:00 EEST)

Turkey	4–4	Luxembourg
İnce 23', 76'; Satılmış 37'; Önal 61'	Report	Elshan 4', 13', 68'; Rodrigues 73'

Albena 1, Albena
Referee: Daniele Chiffi (Italy)
21 September 2022
16:00 (17:00 EEST)

Azerbaijan	0–1	Bulgaria
	Report	Stoyanov 90+4' (pen.)

Albena 1, Albena
Referee: Joonas Jaanovits (Estonia)

24 September 2022
12:00 (13:00 EEST)

Turkey	5–1	Azerbaijan
Karapo 8'; Akman 10', 83'; İnce 28' (pen.); Ortakaya 76'	Report	Akhundzade 44' (pen.)

Albena 1, Albena
Referee: Helgi Mikael Jonásson (Iceland)
24 September 2022
16:00 (17:00 EEST)

Bulgaria	0–0	Luxembourg
	Report

Albena 1, Albena
Referee: Joonas Jaanovits (Estonia)

27 September 2022
16:00 (17:00 EEST)

Bulgaria	1–1	Turkey
Karapo 66' (o.g.)	Report	Pavlov 70' (o.g.)

Stadion Spartak, Varna
Referee: Daniele Chiffi (Italy)
27 September 2022
16:00 (17:00 EEST)

Luxembourg	1–0	Azerbaijan
Elshan 7' (pen.)	Report

Albena 1, Albena
Referee: Helgi Mikael Jonásson (Iceland)

==== Group 3 ====
Pos	Team	Pld	W	D	L	GF	GA	GD	Pts	Qualification
1	Ukraine	3	3	0	0	7	1	+6	**9**	Elite round
2	Sweden (H)	3	1	1	1	3	2	+1	**4**	Elite round
3	Cyprus	3	0	2	1	1	4	−3	**2**	
4	Kosovo	3	0	1	2	0	4	−4	**1**	

Source: UEFA
Rules for classification: Tiebreakers
(H) Hosts
17 November 2022
13:00

Ukraine	1–0	Kosovo
Yarmolyuk 90+5'	Report

Nya Parken, Norrköping
Referee: Ishmael Barbara (Malta)
17 November 2022
18:30

Cyprus	0–0	Sweden
	Report

Nya Parken, Norrköping
Referee: Michal Ocenáš (Slovakia)

20 November 2022
13:00

Ukraine	4–1	Cyprus
Varfolomeyev 10'; Tsarenko 66', 69'; Fedor 79'	Report	Savva 20'

Nya Parken, Norrköping
Referee: Ion Orlic (Moldova)
20 November 2022
13:00

Sweden	3–0	Kosovo
Swedberg 39'; Ahmed 67', 73'	Report

Nya Parken, Norrköping
Referee: Ishmael Barbara (Malta)

23 November 2022
18:00

Sweden	0–2	Ukraine
	Report	Yarmolyuk 58'; Kholod 77'

Nya Parken, Norrköping
Referee: Michal Ocenáš (Slovakia)
23 November 2022
18:00

Kosovo	0–0	Cyprus
	Report

Linköping Arena, Linköping
Referee: Ion Orlic (Moldova)

==== Group 4 ====
Pos	Team	Pld	W	D	L	GF	GA	GD	Pts	Qualification
1	Republic of Ireland	3	3	0	0	9	0	+9	**9**	Elite round
2	Hungary	3	1	1	1	8	1	+7	**4**	Elite round
3	Wales (H)	3	1	1	1	9	4	+5	**4**	
4	Gibraltar	3	0	0	3	2	23	−21	**0**	

Source: UEFA
Rules for classification: Tiebreakers
(H) Hosts
21 September 2022
18:00 (17:00 BST)

Republic of Ireland	6–0	Gibraltar
O'Mahony 12', 55', 58'; Lonergan 75'; Fraser 76'; Grehan 90+1'	Report

Central Park, Denbighshire
Referee: Andrei Chivulete (Romania)
21 September 2022
18:00 (17:00 BST)

Wales	0–0	Hungary
	Report

Nantporth Stadium, Bangor
Referee: Igor Pajac (Croatia)

24 September 2022
14:00 (13:00 BST)

Hungary	8–0	Gibraltar
Dragoner 4', 9'; Berki 30', 32'; Gruber 56'; Tuboly 60'; Kiss 64'; Jurek 88'	Report

Central Park, Denbighshire
Referee: Igor Pajac (Croatia)
24 September 2022
14:00 (13:00 BST)

Republic of Ireland	2–0	Wales
Ferizaj 87'; Umeh 90+3'	Report

Nantporth Stadium, Bangor
Referee: Vitālijs Spasjoņņikovs (Latvia)

27 September 2022
19:00 (18:00 BST)

Gibraltar	2–9	Wales
Huart 44'; Emrani 58' (pen.)	Report	Hanks 9'; Popov 23', 90+4' (pen.); Lloyd 37'; Wigley 38'; Crole 70'; Congreve 79'; Williams 84'; Colwill 88'

Racecourse Ground, Wrexham
Referee: Vitālijs Spasjoņņikovs (Latvia)
27 September 2022
19:00 (18:00 BST)

Hungary	0–1	Republic of Ireland
	Report	Lonergan 27'

Nantporth Stadium, Bangor
Referee: Andrei Chivulete (Romania)

==== Group 5 ====
Pos	Team	Pld	W	D	L	GF	GA	GD	Pts	Qualification
1	Poland (H)	3	2	0	1	4	1	+3	**6 (Note: Head-to-head results: Italy 0–2 Estonia, Poland 2–0 Estonia, Poland 0–1 Italy. Head-to-head standings: Poland: 3 pts, +1 GD (2 GF, 1 GA); Estonia: 3 pts, 0 GD (2 GF, 2 GA); Italy: 3 pts, −1 GD (1 GF, 2 GA))**	Elite round
2	Estonia	3	2	0	1	5	4	+1	**6**	Elite round
3	Italy	3	2	0	1	4	4	0	**6**	Elite round
4	Bosnia and Herzegovina	3	0	0	3	4	8	−4	**0**	

Source: UEFA
Rules for classification: Tiebreakers
(H) Hosts
Notes:
21 September 2022
12:00

Italy	0–2	Estonia
	Report	Švedovski 90'; Õunapuu 90+3'

Stadion Miejski w Rumii, Rumia
Referee: Arda Kardeşler (Turkey)
21 September 2022
18:00

Bosnia and Herzegovina	0–2	Poland
	Report	Kowalczyk 40'; Michalski 88'

Stadion Miejski w Gdyni, Gdynia
Referee: Matthew de Gabriele (Malta)

24 September 2022
12:00

Italy	3–2	Bosnia and Herzegovina
Vignato 2' (pen.), 63' (pen.); Hasa 88'	Report	Šakota 38'; Prskalo 74'

Stadion Miejski w Rumii, Rumia
Referee: Miloš Milanović (Serbia)
24 September 2022
17:00

Poland	2–0	Estonia
Pleńko 65' (pen.), 68'	Report

Stadion Miejski w Gdyni, Gdynia
Referee: Matthew de Gabriele (Malta)

27 September 2022
13:00

Estonia	3–2	Bosnia and Herzegovina
Lehtmets 56'; Luts 86'; Õunapuu 90+4'	Report	Kahvić 25'; Prskalo 30'

Stadion Miejski w Rumii, Rumia
Referee: Miloš Milanović (Serbia)
27 September 2022
13:00

Poland	0–1	Italy
	Report	Vignato 90+4' (pen.)

Stadion Miejski w Gdyni, Gdynia
Referee: Arda Kardeşler (Turkey)

==== Group 6 ====
Pos	Team	Pld	W	D	L	GF	GA	GD	Pts	Qualification
1	Romania (H)	3	1	2	0	2	0	+2	**5**	Elite round
2	Latvia	3	1	2	0	1	0	+1	**5**	Elite round
3	Austria	3	1	1	1	2	2	0	**4**	
4	Lithuania	3	0	1	2	0	3	−3	**1**	

Source: UEFA
Rules for classification: Tiebreakers
(H) Hosts
21 September 2022
14:00 (15:00 EEST)

Austria	2–0	Lithuania
Reischl 44'; Wels 61'	Report

Football Centre FRF, Buftea
Attendance: 60
Referee: Genc Nuza (Kosovo)
21 September 2022
19:00 (20:00 EEST)

Latvia	0–0	Romania
	Report

Football Centre FRF, Buftea
Attendance: 200
Referee: David Munro (Scotland)

24 September 2022
14:00 (15:00 EEST)

Austria	0–0	Latvia
	Report

Football Centre FRF, Buftea
Attendance: 29
Referee: Ashot Ghaltakhchyan (Armenia)
24 September 2022
19:00 (20:00 EEST)

Romania	0–0	Lithuania
	Report

Stadionul Anghel Iordănescu, Voluntari
Attendance: 400
Referee: David Munro (Scotland)

27 September 2022
15:00 (16:00 EEST)

Romania	2–0	Austria
Burnete 41'; Rădăslăvescu 75'	Report

Stadionul Anghel Iordănescu, Voluntari
Attendance: 300
Referee: Genc Nuza (Kosovo)
27 September 2022
15:00 (16:00 EEST)

Lithuania	0–1	Latvia
	Report	Lizunovs 77'

Football Centre FRF, Buftea
Attendance: 20
Referee: Ashot Ghaltakhchyan (Armenia)

==== Group 7 ====
Pos	Team	Pld	W	D	L	GF	GA	GD	Pts	Qualification
1	Spain	2	1	1	0	5	0	+5	**4**	Elite round
2	Belgium (H)	2	1	1	0	3	1	+2	**4**	Elite round
3	Albania	2	0	0	2	1	8	−7	**0**	
4	Russia	0	0	0	0	0	0	0	**0**	Banned due to invasion of Ukraine

Source: UEFA
Rules for classification: Tiebreakers
(H) Hosts
21 September 2022
16:00

Albania	1–3	Belgium
Daka 51'	Report	Sadiki 47'; Stroeykens 64'; Vermant 90+6'

Stedelijk Sportstadion, Hasselt
Referee: Luka Bilbija (Bosnia and Herzegovina)
21 September 2022

Spain	Cancelled	Russia
	Report

24 September 2022
16:00

Spain	5–0	Albania
Morán 8'; Gharbi 18'; Gasiorowski 29'; Martínez 74'; Barberà 82'	Report

Bocholter, Bocholt
Referee: Ivar Orri Kristjansson (Iceland
24 September 2022

Russia	Cancelled	Belgium
	Report

27 September 2022
16:00

Belgium	0–0	Spain
	Report

Cegeka Arena, Genk
Referee: Damian Sylwestrzak (Poland)
27 September 2022

Albania	Cancelled	Russia
	Report

==== Group 8 ====
Pos	Team	Pld	W	D	L	GF	GA	GD	Pts	Qualification
1	France	3	3	0	0	12	1	+11	**9**	Elite round
2	Iceland	3	2	0	1	5	3	+2	**6**	Elite round
3	Scotland (H)	3	1	0	2	6	6	0	**3**	
4	Kazakhstan	3	0	0	3	3	16	−13	**0**	

Source: UEFA
Rules for classification: Tiebreakers
(H) Hosts

16 November 2022
15:00 (14:00 GMT)

France	7–0	Kazakhstan
Tel 20' (pen.), 59', 90+1'; Diop 33', 75' (pen.); Ugochukwu 55'; Mokwa Ntusu 89'	Report

Cappielow, Greenock
Referee: Georgi Davidov (Bulgaria)
16 November 2022
20:30 (19:30 GMT)

Iceland	1–0	Scotland
Óskarsson 70'	Report

Firhill Stadium, Glasgow
Referee: Dumitri Muntean (Moldova)

19 November 2022
16:00 (15:00 GMT)

France	2–0	Iceland
de Lima 10'; Kore 69'	Report

Cappielow, Greenock
Referee: Snir Levy (Israel)
19 November 2022
16:00 (15:00 GMT)

Scotland	5–2	Kazakhstan
Ure 5', 63'; Anderson 41'; Adam 78'; Awokoya-Mebude 90+2'	Report	Trufanov 28'; Askarov 62'

Somerset Park, Ayr
Referee: Georgi Davidov (Bulgaria)

22 November 2022
14:00 (13:00 GMT)

Kazakhstan	1–4	Iceland
Popov 43' (pen.)	Report	Óskarsson 4', 28'; Birgisson 13'; Mikaelsson 45'

Rangers Training Centre, Milngavie
Referee: Snir Levy (Israel)
22 November 2022
20:30 (19:30 GMT)

Scotland	1–3	France
Carse 78' (pen.)	Report	Tel 20', 29' (pen.); Diop 31'

Somerset Park, Ayr
Referee: Dumitri Muntean (Moldova)

==== Group 9 ====
Pos	Team	Pld	W	D	L	GF	GA	GD	Pts	Qualification
1	England	3	3	0	0	12	2	+10	**9**	Elite round
2	Denmark (H)	3	2	0	1	11	6	+5	**6**	Elite round
3	Montenegro	3	1	0	2	4	9	−5	**3**	
4	Georgia	3	0	0	3	2	12	−10	**0**	

Source: UEFA
Rules for classification: Tiebreakers
(H) Hosts
21 September 2022
14:00

Georgia	1–3	Denmark
Gotsiridze 87'	Report	Ross 37'; Bundgaard 40'; Christensen 67'

Hjørring Stadium, Hjørring
Referee: Cesar Soto Grado (Spain)
21 September 2022
18:00

England	2–0	Montenegro
Chambers 61'; Perkins 76'	Report

Hobro Stadium, Hobro
Referee: Marian Alexandru Barbu (Romania)

24 September 2022
14:00

England	6–0	Georgia
Perkins 9', 19' (pen.), 41'; Cannonier 51', 90+4'; Forson 58'	Report

Hjørring Stadium, Hjørring
Referee: Kristoffer Hagenes (Norway)
24 September 2022
18:00

Denmark	6–1	Montenegro
Bøndergaard 3'; Christensen 8', 27'; Dorgu 37'; Horneman 53'; Lyng 79'	Report	Ðukanović 67' (pen.)

Hjørring Stadium, Hjørring
Referee: Marian Alexandru Barbu (Romania)

27 September 2022
14:00

Denmark	2–4	England
Ross 51', 76'	Report	Perkins 49'; Hall 54'; Forson 54'; Gyabi 90+3'

Hjørring Stadium, Hjørring
Referee: Cesar Soto Grado (Spain)
27 September 2022
14:00

Montenegro	3–1	Georgia
Pavićević 43'; Đukanović 73', 77'	Report	Tskhovrebashvili 54'

Hjørring Stadium, Hjørring
Referee: Kristoffer Hagenes (Norway)

==== Group 10 ====
Pos	Team	Pld	W	D	L	GF	GA	GD	Pts	Qualification
1	Serbia	3	3	0	0	8	1	+7	**9**	Elite round
2	Norway	3	2	0	1	8	4	+4	**6**	Elite round
3	North Macedonia (H)	3	1	0	2	5	8	−3	**3**	
4	San Marino	3	0	0	3	0	8	−8	**0**	

Source: UEFA
Rules for classification: Tiebreakers
(H) Hosts
17 November 2022
13:00

Norway	2–0	San Marino
Flataker 56', 88' (pen.)	Report

Gjorče Petrov Stadium, Skopje
Referee: Mohammad Al-Emara (Finland)
17 November 2022
13:00

North Macedonia	1–2	Serbia
Zenku 86'	Report	Lazetić 35' (pen.), 80'

Petar Miloševski Training Centre, Skopje
Referee: Christian-Petru Ciochirca (Austria)

20 November 2022
13:00

Norway	6–2	North Macedonia
Nusa 10', 32'; Hansen-Aarøen 16', 40'; Eng 57'; Gjengaar 70'	Report	Zenku 6'; Trajkov 20'

Petar Miloševski Training Centre, Skopje
Referee: Mohammad Al-Emara (Finland)
20 November 2022
13:00

Serbia	4–0	San Marino
Leković 23'; Kabić 67'; Mijatović 77'; Simić 87'	Report

Gjorče Petrov Stadium, Skopje
Referee: Rob Hennessy (Ireland)

23 November 2022
13:00

Serbia	2–0	Norway
Lazetić 56'; U. Miladinović 86'	Report

Gjorče Petrov Stadium, Skopje
Referee: Christian-Petru Ciochirca (Austria)
23 November 2022
13:00

San Marino	0–2	North Macedonia
	Report	Trajkov 36'; Nazifi 90+5'

Petar Miloševski Training Centre, Skopje
Referee: Rob Hennessy (Ireland)

==== Group 11 ====
Pos	Team	Pld	W	D	L	GF	GA	GD	Pts	Qualification
1	Croatia (H)	3	2	0	1	10	2	+8	**6 (Note: Head-to-head results: Finland 0–4 Israel, Croatia 1–2 Finland, Israel 0–3 Croatia. Head-to-head standings: Croatia: 3 pts, +2 GD (4 GF, 2 GA), Israel: 3 pts, +1 GD (4 GF, 3 GA), Finland: 3 pts, –3 GD (2 GF, 5 GA))**	Elite round
2	Israel	3	2	0	1	6	3	+3	**6**	Elite round
3	Finland	3	2	0	1	7	6	+1	**6**	
4	Faroe Islands	3	0	0	3	1	13	−12	**0**	

Source: UEFA
Rules for classification: Tiebreakers
(H) Hosts
Notes:
16 November 2022
12:00

Finland	0–4	Israel
	Report	Binyamin 18'; Lugassy 21', 65', 90'

Stadion Branko Čavlović-Čavlek, Karlovac
Referee: Robert Ian Jenkins (Wales)
16 November 2022
12:00

Croatia	6–0	Faroe Islands
Rukavina 38'; Brajković 39', 55', 60'; Johannessen 53' (o.g.); Brkljača 82'	Report

Sport Centre Rudes, Zagreb
Referee: Igor Stojchevski (North Macedonia)

19 November 2022
11:00

Israel	2–0	Faroe Islands
Feingold 60'; Binyamin 90+4'	Report

Stadion Sv. Josip Radnik, Sesvete
Referee: Philip Farrugia (Malta)
19 November 2022
12:00

Croatia	1–2	Finland
Prpić 24'	Report	Bushara 18'; Vidjeskog 21'

Sport Centre Rudes, Zagreb
Referee: Robert Ian Jenkins (Wales)

22 November 2022
12:00

Israel	0–3	Croatia
	Report	Zvonarek 2', 34'; Brajković 12'

Sport Centre Rudes, Zagreb
Referee: Igor Stojchevski (North Macedonia)
22 November 2022
12:00

Faroe Islands	1–5	Finland
Sorensen 2'	Report	Talvitie 4'; Bushara 11'; Lotjonen 32', 40'; Liimatta 36'

Stadion Branko Čavlović-Čavlek, Karlovac
Referee: Philip Farrugia (Malta)

==== Group 12 ====
Pos	Team	Pld	W	D	L	GF	GA	GD	Pts	Qualification
1	Germany (H)	3	3	0	0	11	1	+10	**9**	Elite round
2	Slovakia	3	1	1	1	3	2	+1	**4**	Elite round
3	Belarus	3	0	2	1	3	7	−4	**2**	
4	Armenia	3	0	1	2	1	8	−7	**1**	

Source: UEFA
Rules for classification: Tiebreakers
(H) Hosts
21 September 2022
12:00

Germany	5–0	Armenia
Gruda 24'; Damar 32'; Topp 69' (pen.), 79'; Ullrich 90'	Report

GWG-Stadion, Gifhorn
Referee: Darren England (England)
21 September 2022
17:00

Belarus	1–1	Slovakia
Shumansky 46'	Report	Gajdoš 53'

GWG-Stadion, Gifhorn
Referee: Balázs Berke (Hungary)

24 September 2022
11:00

Slovakia	2–0	Armenia
Gajdoš 71'; Masaryk 77'	Report

Konrad-Koch-Stadion, Braunschweig
Referee: Darren England (England)
24 September 2022
16:00

Germany	5–1	Belarus
Damar 24', 74' (pen.); Topp 79', 86'; Ullrich 90+4'	Report	Shumansky 60'

Konrad-Koch-Stadion, Braunschweig
Referee: Jamie Robinson (Northern Ireland)

27 September 2022
16:00

Slovakia	0–1	Germany
	Report	Tohumcu 59' (pen.)

Konrad-Koch-Stadion, Braunschweig
Referee: Balázs Berke (Hungary)
27 September 2022
16:00

Armenia	1–1	Belarus
Tovmasyan 64'	Report	Aheyeu 60'

GWG-Stadion, Gifhorn
Referee: Jamie Robinson (Northern Ireland)

==== Group 13 ====
Pos	Team	Pld	W	D	L	GF	GA	GD	Pts	Qualification
1	Slovenia	3	1	2	0	6	2	+4	**5**	Elite round
2	Northern Ireland	3	1	2	0	4	2	+2	**5**	Elite round
3	Netherlands (H)	3	1	2	0	2	0	+2	**5**	
4	Moldova	3	0	0	3	0	8	−8	**0**	

Source: UEFA
Rules for classification: Tiebreakers
(H) Hosts
21 September 2022
19:30

Netherlands	2–0	Moldova
Strijdonck 67'; Haen 87'	Report

Sportpark De Boshoek, Hardenberg
Referee: Joni Hyytiä (Finland)
21 September 2022
19:30

Northern Ireland	2–2	Slovenia
Kelly 33', 39'	Report	Kuzmic 76'; Potocnik 90'

Sportpark Marsdijk, Assen
Referee: Sayat Karabayev (Kazakhstan)

24 September 2022
15:00

Netherlands	0–0	Northern Ireland
	Report

Sportpark Marsdijk, Assen
Referee: Vitor Ferreira (Portugal)
24 September 2022
15:00

Slovenia	4–0	Moldova
Potocnik 21' (pen.), 63'; Černe 29'; Turudija 74'	Report

Sportpark De Boshoek, Hardenberg
Referee: Sayat Karabayev (Kazakhstan)

27 September 2022
19:30

Slovenia	0–0	Netherlands
	Report

Sportpark De Boshoek, Hardenberg
Referee: Vitor Ferreira (Portugal)
27 September 2022
19:30

Moldova	0–2	Northern Ireland
	Report	Marshall 72'; Scannell 84'

Sportpark Marsdijk, Assen
Referee: Joni Hyytiä (Finland)

=== Ranking of third-placed teams ===
To determine the best third-placed team from the qualifying round which advanced to the elite round, only the results of the third-placed teams against the first and second-placed teams in their group were taken into account.

Pos	Grp	Team	Pld	W	D	L	GF	GA	GD	Pts	Qualification
1	5	Italy	2	1	0	1	1	2	−1	3	Elite round
2	11	Finland	2	1	0	1	2	5	−3	3	
3	2	Bulgaria	2	0	2	0	1	1	0	2	
4	13	Netherlands	2	0	2	0	0	0	0	2	
5	6	Austria	2	0	1	1	0	2	−2	1 (Note: Ranked on disciplinary points: Austria −4, Wales −6.)	
6	4	Wales	2	0	1	1	0	2	−2	1	
7	3	Cyprus	2	0	1	1	1	4	−3	1	
8	12	Belarus	2	0	1	1	2	6	−4	1	
9	1	Switzerland	2	0	0	2	2	5	−3	0	
10	8	Scotland	2	0	0	2	1	4	−3	0	
11	10	North Macedonia	2	0	0	2	3	8	−5	0	
12	9	Montenegro	2	0	0	2	1	8	−7	0 (Note: Ranked on disciplinary points: Montenegro −2, Albania −7.)	
13	7	Albania	2	0	0	2	1	8	−7	0	

Updated to match(es) played on 23 November 2022. Source: UEFA
Rules for classification: 1) points; 2) goal difference; 3) goals scored; 4) disciplinary points; 5) coefficient; 6) drawing of lots.

== Elite round ==
=== Draw ===
The draw for the elite round was held on 8 December 2022, at the UEFA headquarters in Nyon, Switzerland.

Pos	Grp	Team	Pld	W	D	L	GF	GA	GD	Pts	Seeding
1	—	Portugal	0	0	0	0	0	0	0	0	Pot A
2	12	Germany	2	2	0	0	6	1	+5	6	Pot A
3	3	Ukraine	2	2	0	0	6	1	+5	6	Pot A
4	9	England	2	2	0	0	6	2	+4	6	Pot A
5	8	France	2	2	0	0	5	1	+4	6	Pot A
6	10	Serbia	2	2	0	0	4	1	+3	6	Pot A
7	4	Republic of Ireland	2	2	0	0	3	0	+3	6	Pot A
8	7	Spain	2	1	1	0	5	0	+5	4	Pot B
9	1	Greece	2	1	1	0	3	1	+2	4	Pot B
10	6	Romania	2	1	1	0	2	0	+2	4	Pot B
11	11	Croatia	2	1	0	1	4	2	+2	3	Pot B
12	5	Poland	2	1	0	1	2	1	+1	3	Pot B
13	2	Turkey	2	0	2	0	5	5	0	2	Pot B
14	13	Slovenia	2	0	2	0	2	2	0	2	Pot B
15	7	Belgium	2	1	1	0	3	1	+2	4	Pot C
16	1	Czech Republic	2	1	1	0	4	3	+1	4	Pot C
17	9	Denmark	2	1	0	1	8	5	+3	3	Pot C
18	10	Norway	2	1	0	1	6	4	+2	3	Pot C
19	11	Israel	2	1	0	1	4	3	+1	3	Pot C
20	5	Estonia	2	1	0	1	2	2	0	3	Pot C
21	8	Iceland	2	1	0	1	1	2	−1	3	Pot C
22	2	Luxembourg	2	0	2	0	4	4	0	2	Pot D
23	13	Northern Ireland	2	0	2	0	2	2	0	2	Pot D
24	6	Latvia	2	0	2	0	0	0	0	2	Pot D
25	12	Slovakia	2	0	1	1	1	2	−1	1	Pot D
26	4	Hungary	2	0	1	1	0	1	−1	1	Pot D
27	3	Sweden	2	0	1	1	0	2	−2	1	Pot D
28	5	Italy	2	1	0	1	1	2	−1	3	Pot D

Source: UEFA
Rules for classification: 1) group position; 2) points; 3) goal difference; 4) goals scored; 5) disciplinary points; 6) coefficient ranking; 7) drawing of lots.

=== Groups ===
==== Group 1 ====
Pos	Team	Pld	W	D	L	GF	GA	GD	Pts	Qualification
1	Norway	3	3	0	0	11	3	+8	9	Final tournament
2	France (H)	3	2	0	1	6	4	+2	6	
3	Romania	3	1	0	2	5	9	−4	3	
4	Northern Ireland	3	0	0	3	3	9	−6	0	

Source: UEFA
Rules for classification: Qualification tiebreakers
(H) Hosts
22 March 2023
15:00

Norway	4–0	Romania
Hansen-Aarøen 4'; Flataker 14'; Schjelderup 25'; Riisnæs 90+4'	Report

Stade Jacques-Mazzuca, Saran
Referee: Ante Čulina (Croatia)
22 March 2023
18:00

France	1–0	Northern Ireland
Odobert 15'	Report

Stade de la Source, Orléans
Referee: Miloš Gigovic (Bosnia and Herzegovina)

25 March 2023
15:00

Romania	3–1	Northern Ireland
Borza 43', 75'; Mazilu 90'	Report	Marshall 90' (pen.)

Stade Jacques-Mazzuca, Saran
Referee: Ante Čulina (Croatia)
25 March 2023
18:00

France	1–2	Norway
Ben Seghir 8'	Report	Roaldsøy 36'; Nusa 81'

Stade de la Source, Orléans
Referee: Sven Jablonski (Germany)

28 March 2023
15:00

Northern Ireland	2–5	Norway
Marshall 38', 59'	Report	Murugesapillai 17'; Eng 45+1', 61'; Flataker 56' (pen.), 89' (pen.)

Stade Jacques-Mazzuca, Saran
Referee: Miloš Gigovic (Bosnia and Herzegovina)
28 March 2023
15:00

Romania	2–4	France
Pop 30'; Trică 77'	Report	Diop 13'; Efekele 15'; Doué 43'; Ben Seghir 81' (pen.)

Stade de la Source, Orléans
Referee: Sven Jablonski (Germany)

==== Group 2 ====
Pos	Team	Pld	W	D	L	GF	GA	GD	Pts	Qualification
1	Italy	3	1	2	0	5	4	+1	5	Final tournament
2	Germany (H)	3	1	1	1	6	4	+2	4	
3	Belgium	3	0	3	0	3	3	0	3	
4	Slovenia	3	0	2	1	0	3	−3	2	

Source: UEFA
Rules for classification: Qualification tiebreakers
(H) Hosts
22 March 2023
12:00

Germany	2–3	Italy
Damar 53'; Kabadayi 59'	Report	Pisilli 18', 67'; D'Andrea 24'

Weserstadion Platz 11, Bremen
Referee: Atilla Karaoglan (Turkey)
22 March 2023
16:00

Belgium	0–0	Slovenia
	Report

BSA Obervieland, Bremen
Referee: Ivo Torres (Luxembourg)

25 March 2023
12:00

Slovenia	0–0	Italy
	Report

BSA Obervieland, Bremen
Referee: Andreas Argyrou (Cyprus)
25 March 2023
16:00

Germany	1–1	Belgium
Topp 15'	Report	Vermant 30' (pen.)

Sportplatz Vinnenweg, Bremen
Referee: Ivo Torres (Luxembourg)

28 March 2023
12:00

Slovenia	0–3	Germany
	Report	Tresoldi 26'; Ullrich 37' (pen.); Diehl 68'

Weserstadion Platz 11, Bremen
Referee: Andreas Argyrou (Cyprus)
28 March 2023
12:00

Italy	2–2	Belgium
D'Andrea 45+1' (pen.); Esposito 51' (pen.)	Report	Bassette 8'; Stroeykens 85' (pen.)

Sportplatz Vinnenweg, Bremen
Referee: Atilla Karaoglan (Turkey)

==== Group 3 ====
Pos	Team	Pld	W	D	L	GF	GA	GD	Pts	Qualification
1	Spain (H)	3	2	1	0	8	0	+8	7	Final tournament
2	Denmark	3	2	1	0	6	2	+4	7	
3	Luxembourg	3	1	0	2	3	9	−6	3	
4	Ukraine	3	0	0	3	2	8	−6	0	

Source: UEFA
Rules for classification: Qualification tiebreakers
(H) Hosts
22 March 2023
17:00

Denmark	0–0	Spain
	Report

Francisco de la Hera, Almendralejo
Referee: Erkan Özdamar (Turkey)
22 March 2023
20:00

Ukraine	1–2	Luxembourg
Horbach 12'	Report	Elshan 17', 59'

Estadio Municipal Villanovense, Badajoz
Referee: Damian Sylwestrzak (Poland)

25 March 2023
16:00

Ukraine	1–2	Denmark
Tsarenko 31'	Report	Dorgu 45'; Sertdemir 51'

Francisco de la Hera, Almendralejo
Referee: David Šmajc (Slovenia)
25 March 2023
18:00

Spain	4–0	Luxembourg
Palacios 6'; Alarcón 28', 90+1'; Barberà 60'	Report

Estadio Municipal Villanovense, Badajoz
Referee: Damian Sylwestrzak (Poland)

28 March 2023
18:00

Luxembourg	1–4	Denmark
Dardari 20'	Report	Sertdemir 14'; Bundgaard 78', 80'; Ross 82'

Francisco de la Hera, Almendralejo
Referee: David Šmajc (Slovenia)
28 March 2023
18:00

Spain	4–0	Ukraine
Palacios 3'; Alarcón 7'; Rodríguez 22'; Barberà 59'	Report

Estadio Municipal Villanovense, Badajoz
Referee: Erkan Özdamar (Turkey)

==== Group 4 ====
Pos	Team	Pld	W	D	L	GF	GA	GD	Pts	Qualification
1	Portugal (H)	3	3	0	0	7	0	+7	9	Final tournament
2	Czechia	3	2	0	1	6	6	0	6	
3	Sweden	3	0	1	2	3	5	−2	1	
4	Croatia	3	0	1	2	2	7	−5	1	

Source: UEFA
Rules for classification: Qualification tiebreakers
(H) Hosts
22 March 2023
12:00

Czechia	3–1	Croatia
Ambros 32'; Šín 56'; Šmiga 86'	Report	Matić 29'

Sports Center CF Fão, Fão
Referee: Oleksii Derevinskyi (Ukraine)
22 March 2023
19:00

Portugal	1–0	Sweden
Neves 90+3'	Report

Estádio do FC Vizela, Vizela
Referee: Evangelos Manouchos (Greece)

25 March 2023
14:00

Croatia	1–1	Sweden
Antunović 4'	Report	Swedberg 31'

Estádio do FC Vizela, Vizela
Referee: Evangelos Manouchos (Greece)
28 March 2023
18:00

Portugal	3–0	Czechia
Brás 5'; Félix 49', 81'	Report

Estádio Cidade de Barcelos, Barcelos
Referee: Robert Jones (England)

28 March 2023
18:00

Croatia	0–3	Portugal
	Report	Sá 15'; D. Moreira 54'; Félix 76'

Estádio Cidade de Barcelos, Barcelos
Referee: Robert Jones (England)
28 March 2023
18:00

Sweden	2–3	Czechia
Odefalk 66'; Ahmed 85'	Report	Špatenka 55'; Šín 79'; Ambros 88'

Sports Center CF Fão, Fão
Referee: Oleksii Derevinskyi (Ukraine)

==== Group 5 ====
Pos	Team	Pld	W	D	L	GF	GA	GD	Pts	Qualification
1	Greece	3	2	1	0	5	1	+4	7	Final tournament
2	Slovakia	3	2	1	0	6	3	+3	7	
3	Republic of Ireland (H)	3	1	0	2	2	3	−1	3	
4	Estonia	3	0	0	3	1	7	−6	0	

Source: UEFA
Rules for classification: Qualification tiebreakers
(H) Hosts
22 March 2023
16:30

Republic of Ireland	1–2	Slovakia
Lonergan 90+6'	Report	Gajdoš 81'; Griger 90+4'

Ferrycarrig Park, Wexford
Referee: Sander van der Eijk (Netherlands)
22 March 2023
20:30

Estonia	0–3	Greece
	Report	Tzimas 21', 27' (pen.); Nikolaou 90+6'

Waterford Regional Sports Centre, Waterford
Referee: Ivar Orri Kristjansson (Iceland)

25 March 2023
16:30

Republic of Ireland	1–0	Estonia
Zefi 66' (pen.)	Report

Ferrycarrig Park, Wexford
Referee: Luca Cibelli (Switzerland)
25 March 2023
20:30

Greece	1–1	Slovakia
Koutsias 67'	Report	Gajdoš 50'

Waterford Regional Sports Centre, Waterford
Referee: Ivar Orri Kristjansson (Iceland)

28 March 2023
20:30

Slovakia	3–1	Estonia
Gajdoš 56', 89'; Sauer 67'	Report	Õunapuu 87'

Waterford Regional Sports Centre, Waterford
Referee: Luca Cibelli (Switzerland)
28 March 2023
20:30

Greece	1–0	Republic of Ireland
Smyrlis 48'	Report

Ferrycarrig Park, Wexford
Referee: Sander van der Eijk (Netherlands)

==== Group 6 ====
Pos	Team	Pld	W	D	L	GF	GA	GD	Pts	Qualification
1	Poland (H)	3	1	2	0	6	3	+3	5	Final tournament
2	Israel	3	1	2	0	5	3	+2	5	
3	Serbia	3	1	1	1	4	5	−1	4	
4	Latvia	3	0	1	2	1	5	−4	1	

Source: UEFA
Rules for classification: Qualification tiebreakers
(H) Hosts
22 March 2023
11:00

Serbia	1–0	Latvia
Leković 90+3'	Report

RKS Garbarnia Kraków, Kraków
Attendance: 50
Referee: Miguel Nogueira (Portugal)
22 March 2023
14:00

Israel	1–1	Poland
Binyamin 25'	Report	Koperski 10'

Cracovia Training Center, Rączna
Attendance: 538
Referee: Elchin Masiyev (Azerbaijan)

25 March 2023
11:00

Serbia	1–3	Israel
Đurđević 76'	Report	Abed 24', 33' (pen.); Salman 69'

RKS Garbarnia Kraków, Kraków
Attendance: 102
Referee: John Brooks (England)
25 March 2023
14:00

Poland	3–0	Latvia
Urbański 49', 86'; Pieńko 78'	Report

Cracovia Training Center, Rączna
Attendance: 498
Referee: Miguel Nogueira (Portugal)

28 March 2023
14:00

Poland	2–2	Serbia
Simić 77' (o.g.); Matyjewicz 87'	Report	Petković 32' (pen.); Mimović 59'

Cracovia Training Center, Rączna
Attendance: 492
Referee: John Brooks (England)
28 March 2023
14:00

Latvia	1–1	Israel
Lizunovs 28'	Report	Khalaily 45'

RKS Garbarnia Kraków, Kraków
Attendance: 30
Referee: Elchin Masiyev (Azerbaijan)

==== Group 7 ====
Pos	Team	Pld	W	D	L	GF	GA	GD	Pts	Qualification
1	Iceland	3	2	1	0	5	2	+3	7	Final tournament
2	England (H)	3	2	0	1	3	1	+2	6	
3	Turkey	3	0	2	1	3	5	−2	2	
4	Hungary	3	0	1	2	1	4	−3	1	

Source: UEFA
Rules for classification: Qualification tiebreakers
(H) Hosts
22 March 2023
15:00

Iceland	2–2	Turkey
Óskarsson 34' (pen.); Hlynsson 90'	Report	Karapo 19'; Akar 48'

St George's Park - Pitch 4, Burton-on-Trent
Referee: Luca Pairetto (Italy)
22 March 2023
20:30

England	1–0	Hungary
Webster 33'	Report

Bescot Stadium, Walsall
Referee: Adam Ladebäck (Sweden)

25 March 2023
15:00

England	0–1	Iceland
	Report	Óskarsson 50'

New York Stadium, Rotherham
Referee: Jakob Alexander Sundberg (Denmark)
25 March 2023
20:30

Turkey	1–1	Hungary
Demir 85'	Report	Jurek 73'

St George's Park - Pitch 4, Burton-on-Trent
Referee: Luca Pairetto (Italy)

28 March 2023
20:30

Turkey	0–2	England
	Report	Cozier-Duberry 47'; Hall 64'

Proact Stadium, Chesterfield
Referee: Adam Ladebäck (Sweden)
28 March 2023
20:30

Hungary	0–2	Iceland
	Report	Óskarsson 67'; Mikaelsson 90+5'

St George's Park - Pitch 4, Burton-on-Trent
Referee: Jakob Alexander Sundberg (Denmark)

== Qualified teams ==
The following eight teams qualified for the final tournament.

Team	Qualified as	Qualified on	Previous appearances in Under-19 Euro^{1} only U-19 era (since 2002)
Malta	Hosts	19 April 2021	0 (debut)
Norway	Elite round Group 1 winners	25 March 2023	5 (2002, 2003, 2005, 2018, 2019)
Portugal	Elite round Group 4 winners	25 March 2023	11 (2003, 2006, 2007, 2010, 2012, 2013, 2014, 2016, 2017, **2018**, 2019)
Italy	Elite round Group 2 winners	28 March 2023	8 (**2003**, 2004, 2008, 2010, 2016, 2018, 2019, 2022)
Spain	Elite round Group 3 winners	28 March 2023	12 (**2002**, **2004**, **2006**, **2007**, 2008, 2009, 2010, **2011**, **2012**, 2013, **2015**, **2019**)
Greece	Elite round Group 5 winners	28 March 2023	6 (2005, 2007, 2008, 2011, 2012, 2015)
Poland	Elite round Group 6 winners	28 March 2023	2 (2004, 2006)
Iceland	Elite round Group 7 winners	28 March 2023	0 (debut)

^{1} Bold indicates champions for that year. Italic indicates hosts for that year.

== Goalscorers ==
In the qualifying round, there were 235 goals scored in 75 matches, for an average of 3.13 goals per match. In the elite round, there were 118 goals scored in 42 matches, for an average of 2.81 goals per match. In total, there were 191 goals scored in 63 matches, for an average of 3.03 goals per match.

5 goals

- (England) Sonny Perkins

4 goals

- (Germany) Keke Topp
- (Iceland) Orri Óskarsson
- (Luxembourg) Leon Elshan
- (Norway) Erik Flataker

3 goals

- (Croatia) Roko Brajković
- (Denmark) Gustav Christensen
- (Denmark) Oliver Ross
- (France) Mathys Tel
- (Germany) Muhammed Damar
- (Israel) Ariel Lugassy
- (Italy) Samuele Vignato
- (Montenegro) Viktor Ðukanović
- (Norway) Antonio Nusa
- (Norway) Isak Hansen-Aarøen
- (Norway) Jacob Eng
- (Republic of Ireland) Mark O'Mahony
- (Slovenia) Jaka Cuber Potocnik
- (Turkey) Burak İnce
- (Ukraine) Anton Tsarenko

2 goals

- (Belarus) Artem Shumansky
- (Bosnia and Herzegovina) Antonio Prskalo
- (Czech Republic) Lukáš Mašek
- (Czech Republic) Daniel Šmiga
- (England) Oakley Cannonier
- (England) Omari Forson
- (Estonia) Egert Õunapuu
- (France) Edan Diop
- (Germany) Lukas Ullrich
- (Greece) Georgios Koutsias
- (Greece) Nikolaos Spyrakos
- (Hungary) Marcell Berki
- (Hungary) Aron Matyas Dragoner
- (Israel) Ran Binyamin
- (Northern Ireland) Patrick Kelly
- (Poland) Tomasz Pieńko
- (Republic of Ireland) Tom Lonergan
- (Scotland) Robbie Ure
- (Serbia) Marko Lazetić
- (Slovakia) Artur Gajdoš
- (Switzerland) Nando Toggenburger
- (Turkey) Hamza Akman
- (Ukraine) Yehor Yarmolyuk
- (Wales) Chris Popov

1 goal

- (Albania) Dario Daka
- (Armenia) Vardan Tovmasyan
- (Austria) Luka Reischl
- (Austria) Mortiz Wels
- (Azerbaijan) Nariman Akhundzade
- (Belarus) Arseni Aheyeu
- (Belgium) Noah Sadiki
- (Belgium) Mario Stroeykens
- (Belgium) Romeo Vermant
- (Bosnia and Herzegovina) Aleksandar Kahvić
- (Bosnia and Herzegovina) Matej Šakota
- (Bulgaria) Antoan Stoyanov
- (Croatia) Marko Brkljača
- (Croatia) Dominik Prpić
- (Croatia) Gabrijel Rukavina
- (Czech Republic) Štěpán Beran
- (Czech Republic) Lucas Kubr
- (Czech Republic) Adam Sevinsky
- (Denmark) Asbjørn Bøndergaard
- (Denmark) Filip Bundgaard
- (Denmark) Patrick Dorgu
- (Denmark) Charly Horneman
- (Denmark) Alexander Lyng
- (England) Luke Chambers
- (England) Darko Gyabi
- (England) Lewis Hall
- (Estonia) Gregor Lehtmets
- (Estonia) Daniel Luts
- (Estonia) Aleksander Švedovski
- (Finland) Badreddine Bushara
- (Finland) Isak Vidjeskog
- (France) Marvin de Lima
- (France) Wakis Kore
- (France) David Mokwa Ntusu
- (France) Lesley Ugochukwu
- (Georgia (country)) Davit Gotsiridze
- (Georgia (country)) Nikolozi Tskhovrebashvili
- (Germany) Brajan Gruda
- (Germany) Umut Tohumcu
- (Gibraltar) Rafi Emrani
- (Gibraltar) Francis Huart
- (Greece) Georgios Kyriopoulos
- (Greece) Zisis Tsikos
- (Hungary) Zsombor Gruber
- (Hungary) Gábor Jurek
- (Hungary) Norbert Kiss
- (Hungary) Máté Tuboly
- (Israel) Ilay Feingold
- (Italy) Luis Hasa
- (Kazakhstan) Sultan Askarov
- (Kazakhstan) Yan Trufanov
- (Latvia) Valerijs Lizunovs
- (Luxembourg) James Alves Rodrigues
- (Montenegro) Bojan Pavićević
- (Netherlands) Devin Haen
- (Netherlands) Bayron Strijdonck
- (North Macedonia) Shaban Zenku
- (Northern Ireland) Callum Marshall
- (Northern Ireland) Conor Scannell
- (Poland) Mateusz Kowalczyk
- (Poland) Szymon Michalski
- (Republic of Ireland) Justin Ferizaj
- (Republic of Ireland) Nathan Fraser
- (Republic of Ireland) Sean Grehan
- (Republic of Ireland) Franco Umeh
- (Romania) Rareș Burnete
- (Romania) Eduard Rădăslăvescu
- (Scotland) Josh Adam
- (Scotland) Matthew Anderson
- (Scotland) Adedire Awokoya-Mebude
- (Slovakia) Andy Masaryk
- (Slovenia) Gašper Černe
- (Slovenia) Srdjan Kuzmic
- (Slovenia) Luka Turudija
- (Spain) Víctor Barberà
- (Spain) Yarek Gasiorowski
- (Spain) Ismaël Gharbi
- (Spain) Roger Martínez
- (Spain) Manuel Ángel Morán
- (Switzerland) Federico Crescenti
- (Switzerland) Esey Gebreyesus
- (Turkey) Ayberk Karapo
- (Turkey) Başar Önal
- (Turkey) Emir Ortakaya
- (Turkey) Sami Satılmış
- (Ukraine) Oleh Fedor
- (Ukraine) Ihor Horbach
- (Ukraine) Vitaliy Kholod
- (Ukraine) Ivan Varfolomeyev
- (Wales) Joel Colwill
- (Wales) Cameron Congreve
- (Wales) James Crole
- (Wales) Justin Hanks
- (Wales) Ben Lloyd
- (Wales) Morgan Wigley
- (Wales) Zac Williams

1 own goal

- (Bulgaria) Todor Pavlov (against Turkey)
- (Faroe Islands) Sølvi Johannessen (against Croatia)
- (Turkey) Ayberk Karapo (against Bulgaria)

Source: UEFA.com
