= Jan Guzyk =

Polish con artist (1875–1928)

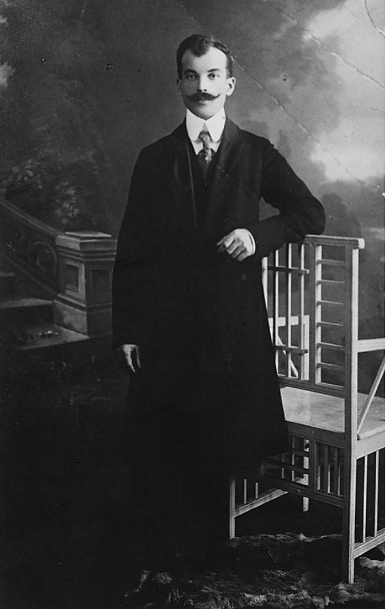
- Born: 1875; Rączna
- Died: 1928
- Occupation: Spiritualist medium

Jan Guzyk (1875–1928), also known as Jan Guzik, was a Polish spiritualist medium known for his alleged ability of psychokinesis. Guzyk was exposed as a fraud by psychical researchers Harry Price and Max Dessoir.

== Biography ==
Guzyk was born in the village of Rączna, near Kraków. He was the son of a weaver. He became a medium at the age of fifteen. It was alleged he could materialize spirits and perform levitation and psychokinesis of objects. Guzyk was endorsed by the psychical researcher Gustav Geley who attended his séances.

== Investigations ==
Skeptical investigator Paul Heuzé and a professional illusionist known as Professor Dicksonn suspected that Guzyk was fraudulent and that Geley and other psychical researchers had been duped by trickery. In November 1923, Heuzé organized five scientists, including French physicist Paul Langevin to observe Guzyk during a series of séances at Sorbonne. Objects were moved but only in close reach of the medium. They committee concluded that he had freed one of his legs to perform the phenomena. When tighter controls were introduced, nothing happened. Their report published in the L'Année Psychologique, stated that fraud was "complete and without reserve".

Guzyk was said to have utilized his elbows and legs to move objects around the room and touch the sitters. He was caught cheating by the psychical researcher Harry Price. According to Price the "man was clever, especially with his feet, which were almost as useful to him as his hands in producing phenomena." Price also noted that Guzyk impersonated a "spirit" animal during a séance by placing his hand in a stocking to stimulate the illusion of a snapping jaw.

Psychologist Max Dessoir wrote that the trick of Guzyk was to use his "foot for psychic touches and sounds". He was investigated many times and his mediumship was detected in fraud. At a séance in Kraków in December 1924 a photograph showed him moving a curtain with his hand. Walter Franklin Prince who attended séances with Guzyk came to the conclusion he had no paranormal ability. The psychical researcher Paul Tabori has written that it was established beyond doubt that Guzyk had cheated at his séances.
