= Max Dessoir =

German philosopher (1867–1947)

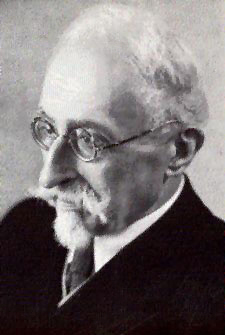
- Born: 8 February 1867; Berlin, Kingdom of Prussia, North German Confederation
- Died: 19 July 1947 (aged 80); Königstein im Taunus, Allied-occupied Germany
- Occupations: Philosopher, psychologist, parapsychologist

Education
- Education: University of Berlin (Dr. phil., 1889); University of Würzburg (Dr. med., 1892)
- Theses: Karl Philipp Moritz als Aesthetiker (Karl Philipp Moritz as an aesthetician) (1889); Zur Physiologie des Temperatursinnes (On the Physiology of the Sense of Temperature) (1892)
- Academic advisors: Wilhelm Dilthey, Adolf Eugen Fick

Philosophical work
- Institutions: University of Berlin (1897–1933)
- Doctoral students: Heidrun Kaupen-Haas

Maximilian Dessoir (8 February 1867 – 19 July 1947) was a German philosopher, psychologist and theorist of aesthetics.

== Career ==
Dessoir was born in Berlin, into a German Jewish family, his parents being Ludwig Dessoir (1810-1874), "Germany's most admired Shakespearean actor", and Ludwig's third wife Auguste Grünemeyer (died about 1924). Max earned doctorates from the universities of Berlin (philosophy, 1889) and Würzburg (medicine, 1892). He was a professor at Berlin from 1897 until 1933, when the Nazis forbade him to teach.

An associate of Pierre Janet and Sigmund Freud, Dessoir published in 1890 a book on The Double Ego, describing the mind as divided into two layers, each with its own associative links - its own chain of memory. He considered that the 'underconsciousness' (Unterbewusstein) emerged in such phenomena as dreams, hypnosis, and dual personality. His work was built on by Otto Rank in his study of the Doppelgänger.

In an article of 1894, Dessoir published an account of the evolution of the sex instinct from undifferentiated to differentiated, which was taken up by Albert Moll and Sigmund Freud. Freud cites it approvingly in his Three Essays on the Theory of Sexuality.

Considered a Neo-Kantian philosopher Max Dessoir founded the Zeitschift für Ästhetik und allgemeine Kunstwissenschaft, which he edited for many years, and published the work Ästhetik und allgemeine Kunstwissenschaft in which he formulated five primary aesthetic forms: the beautiful, the sublime, the tragic, the ugly, and the comic.

Dussoir was married to soprano Susanne Dessoir. He died in Königstein im Taunus at the age of 80.

== Parapsychology ==
In 1889, in an article in the German periodical Sphinx, Dessoir coined the term 'parapsychology' (actually in its German equivalent, 'Parapsychologie'): "If one ... characterizes by para- something going beyond or besides the ordinary, than one could perhaps call the phenomena that step outside the usual process of the inner life parapsychical, and the science dealing with them parapsychology. The word is not nice, yet in my opinion it has the advantage to denote a hitherto unknown fringe area between the average and the pathological states; however, more than the limited value of practical usefulness such neologisms do not demand."

Dessoir was a member of the Society for Psychical Research. He was highly skeptical of physical mediumship. He was the author of the book Vom Jenseits der Seele: Die Geheimwissenschaften in kritischer Betrachtung (The "beyond" of the soul: occult sciences critically examined) that went through six editions. The book contained skeptical information on the mediums Jan Guzyk, Franek Kluski, Henry Slade and many others. The 1930 sixth edition (reprinted in 1967) contained an exposure of the alleged poltergeist victim Eleonore Zugun. According to Dessoir she had performed the phenomena fraudulently.

== Magic ==
Dessoir was an amateur magician who had used the pseudonym "Edmund W. Rells". He was interested in the history and psychology of magic. He published a series of articles entitled The Psychology of Legerdemain, which were printed in five weekly installments for the Open Court journal from 23 March – 20 April 1893.

His article Psychology of the Art of Conjuring was included in H. J. Burlingame's book Around the World with a Magician and a Juggler (1891).

== Publications ==
- Bibliographie des modernen Hypnotismus (1888)
- Karl Philipp Moritz als Aesthetiker (1889)
- Geschichte der neueren deutschen Psychologie (1902)
- Zeitschrift für Ästhetik und allgemeine kunstwissenschaft (1906)
- Outlines of the History of Psychology (1912)
- Vom Jenseits der Seele: Die Geheimwissenschaften in kritischer Betrachtung (1917, 1920, 1930, reprinted in 1967)

On magic

- Psychology of the Art of Conjuring (1891)
- Psychologische Skizzen (1893, Edmund W. Rells [pseud.])
- Dessoir, M. (1893). The Psychology of Legerdemain. The Open Court 7: 3599-3602.

Translations to English

- Aesthetics and theory of art : Ästhetik und allgemeine Kunstwissenschaft / Translated by Stephen A. Emery. With a foreword by Thomas Munro (1970)

== See also ==
- Albert Moll
