= Albert Moll (German psychiatrist) =

German psychiatrist (1862–1939)

Albert Moll (German: [mɔl]; 4 May 1862 – 23 September 1939) was a neurologist, psychologist, sexologist, and ethicist. Alongside Iwan Bloch and Magnus Hirschfeld, he is considered the founder of medical psychology and sexology. Although Moll was a pioneer of sexology, his contemporaries such as Magnus Hirschfeld and Sigmund Freud eclipsed his work, primarily due to the bitter rivalry between them. Moll accused Freud of selection bias, and Freud claimed Moll could not handle constructive criticism after their first meeting.

Moll believed human sexual nature involved two entirely distinct parts: sexual stimulation and sexual attraction.

== Biography ==
Born in Lissa (then part of Prussia) to a Jewish tradesman, Moll attended Catholic school in the Silesian city of Glogau before studying medicine in Breslau, Freiburg, Jena, and Berlin. In 1885, Moll completed his doctorate, having researched the consequences of the long-term immobilization of joints in laboratory animals.

On a tour of Salpêtrière Hospital in Paris, Moll observed the now-famous demonstrations of hysteria and hypnosis by Jean-Martin Charcot. Returning to Berlin in 1887, Moll opened a private practice for nervous diseases where he used association therapy for patients with nervous complaints and aberrant sexual behavior.

Moll was one of the first members of the Berlin Society for Experimental Psychology. In 1913, he founded the International Society for Sexual Research. He planned an international conference on this theme, but it was ultimately delayed due to World War I.

In 1926, Moll organized and chaired the week-long International Congress for Sexology in Berlin, the first international scientific congress in Germany since the war. In the early 1920s, he founded a private Institute for Practical Psychology, performing psychological tests and rendering career advice.

Moll often served as an expert witness in court, especially in cases concerning sexual offenses. Moll believed that psychologists should not be used as forensic experts in court, but rather courts should consult with psychiatrists with training in psychology, as they would have a medical expert's opinion to add to a case. He worked until 1938 when the Nazi administration revoked his medical license due to his Jewish heritage.

He died unmarried only one year later, in September 1939.

== Rivalries ==
=== Sigmund Freud ===
Moll's publication Das Sexualleben des Kindes (1908) enraged Sigmund Freud for its criticism of psychoanalysis. Moll believed that Freud's definition of infant sexuality lacked precision and an adequate foundation. Moll remained unconvinced of Freud's case studies, suggesting the symbolic representations he made were guided only by his assumptions and not empirical evidence, meaning they had no scientific use in determining the theory's soundness.

Moll believed that Freud influenced his patients' memories through therapist suggestion and that he overstated the influence of sexuality in the etiology of neuroses. Moll added that he attempted to use Freud's therapeutic method to treat neurotic patients but found that sexuality played no prominent role, in opposition to Freud's claims.

Freud disparaged Moll among his colleagues even before Das Sexualleben appeared. Moll was a prominent physician in Berlin. Freud and his contemporaries were defensive as physicians historically viewed psychoanalysis with skepticism or open hostility. Freud questioned Moll's credentials and defamed his character, even accusing Moll of plagiarism for not crediting Freud in his criticisms of infant sexuality and psychoanalytical technique.

After a visit by Moll, Freud wrote in a letter to Carl Jung that "in short, [Moll] is a beast, basically not a doctor; he has the intellectual and moral constitution of a pettifogger … He has polluted my room like the devil himself, and I have not … put him in his place firmly enough. Now, of course, we have to expect the nastiest attacks from him."

=== Magnus Hirschfeld ===
Albert Moll and Magnus Hirschfeld are among the most prominent sexologists and medical psychologists of the 20th century. Neither Moll nor Hirschfeld ever married and neither had, as far as we know, any children. Both published their first sexological work on homosexuality. This is where their similarities end.

Moll regarded himself as a pure scientist free of political interests while Hirschfeld identified less with the medical profession and more as a scientific humanitarian. Hirschfeld is often recognized as the first champion of the homosexual movement. He never wrote about his own sexual orientation but was commonly identified as a homosexual. Historians speculate on Moll's interior life and note he was a lifelong bachelor. Moll affirmed that Hirschfeld had a "problematic nature". He perceived him as effeminate and questioned his objectivity, particularly in the cases of sexual perversion and criminal sexual offences. Hirschfeld, in turn, disputed Moll's skill and expertise as an expert witness in court on such matters.

Moll would later ferociously denounce Hirschfeld in matters of homosexuality. Moll eviscerated Hirschfeld's Scientific-Humanitarian Committee's position on homosexuality as a "poison" for each homosexual seeking a "cure." He felt the committee emphasized agitation and manipulated science to glorify deviant sexual behavior. Moll went as far as threatening to publish evidence of Hirschfeld's "problematic nature".

In the end, Moll never published this "evidence". Hirschfeld had moved to Paris, exiled by the Nazis. In January 1934, Moll sent a letter to the dean of the Parisian medical faculty and German foreign secretary. In his letter, Moll claimed that Hirschfeld's reputation as a physician and scientist was marred by his politics and personal convictions. He went on to describe Hirschfeld as a "duplicitous opportunist", portraying himself as a militarist until his political associations were unveiled on the day of the revolution in Berlin. As a result, Hirschfeld was banned from practising medicine in France. One year later, he died in exile.

== Views on homosexuality ==
Moll's constantly changing views on homosexuality were based around real homosexual relations he saw around him, his conflicting feelings on the impact sexology had on society, his feuds with Freud and Hirschfeld, and his own career initiatives. His works on homosexuality mainly consisted of case studies and biographical accounts from patients of his, which was customary for the time. His own reflections and comments on those studies were considered to be much more in depth than some other sexologists of the time, including Krafft-Ebing whom Moll admired (as a matter of fact, he completely revised and updated his famous Psychopathia sexualis, issuing in 1924 its 16th-17th edition).

Moll believed that Western European male homosexuality may have experienced a shift from attraction to younger boys to attraction to adult men during the 1800s. He argued this due to the ancient system of "boy love" (paiderastia) in Greece gave away to love between adult men during this time period.

Moll did not believe that homosexuality was a result of masturbation or seduction, he believed if they did play a role, it was simply to reveal preexisting feelings. He originally argued that because it was something innate in people, homosexuality should not be illegal nor considered immoral. Contradictory to most sexologists at the time, Moll believed female homosexuality was just as prevalent as male homosexuality.

Despite his previous defenses of homosexuality, later in his career he posted a work that homosexuality was a sign of degeneration. He stated that homosexuality was pathological and that only heterosexual sex is natural.

=== Criminalization of homosexuality ===
In the 1920s, a shift in German public opinion led to harsher punishment of sexual crimes despite no changes to the law. Imperial Penal Code 175 prohibited an "unnatural sex act committed between persons of male sex or by humans with animals" under threat of imprisonment and loss of civil rights. Courts broadly interpreted this code to harshly punish all perceived sexual deviancy. German sexologists and medical psychologists, often called as expert witnesses in such cases, responded with a petition for the legal equivalence of homosexual and heterosexual acts between consenting adults. Moll was one of the first to sign the petition, drafted by Hirschfeld's Scientific–Humanitarian Committee, to the German parliament.

However, Moll later turned against the Committee, arguing as a moral objectivist. He argued that one rarely regards one's own behavior as pathological or disordered. Moll saw other advocates for repeal as exalting homosexuality. Moll claimed that self-guilt or abhorrence were negligible from a medical point of view, as was the question of homosexual heredity. Moll endorsed treatment for homosexuality, comparing it to physical deformities such as the cleft palate. In conclusion, Moll advised the "decently thinking homosexual" to ignore any vestiges of pride in homosexuality should he expect sympathy from heterosexual society. Moll opposed harsh legal penalties for consensual homosexual acts while also promoting conversion therapy, a practice now considered harmful.

== Sexual theories ==
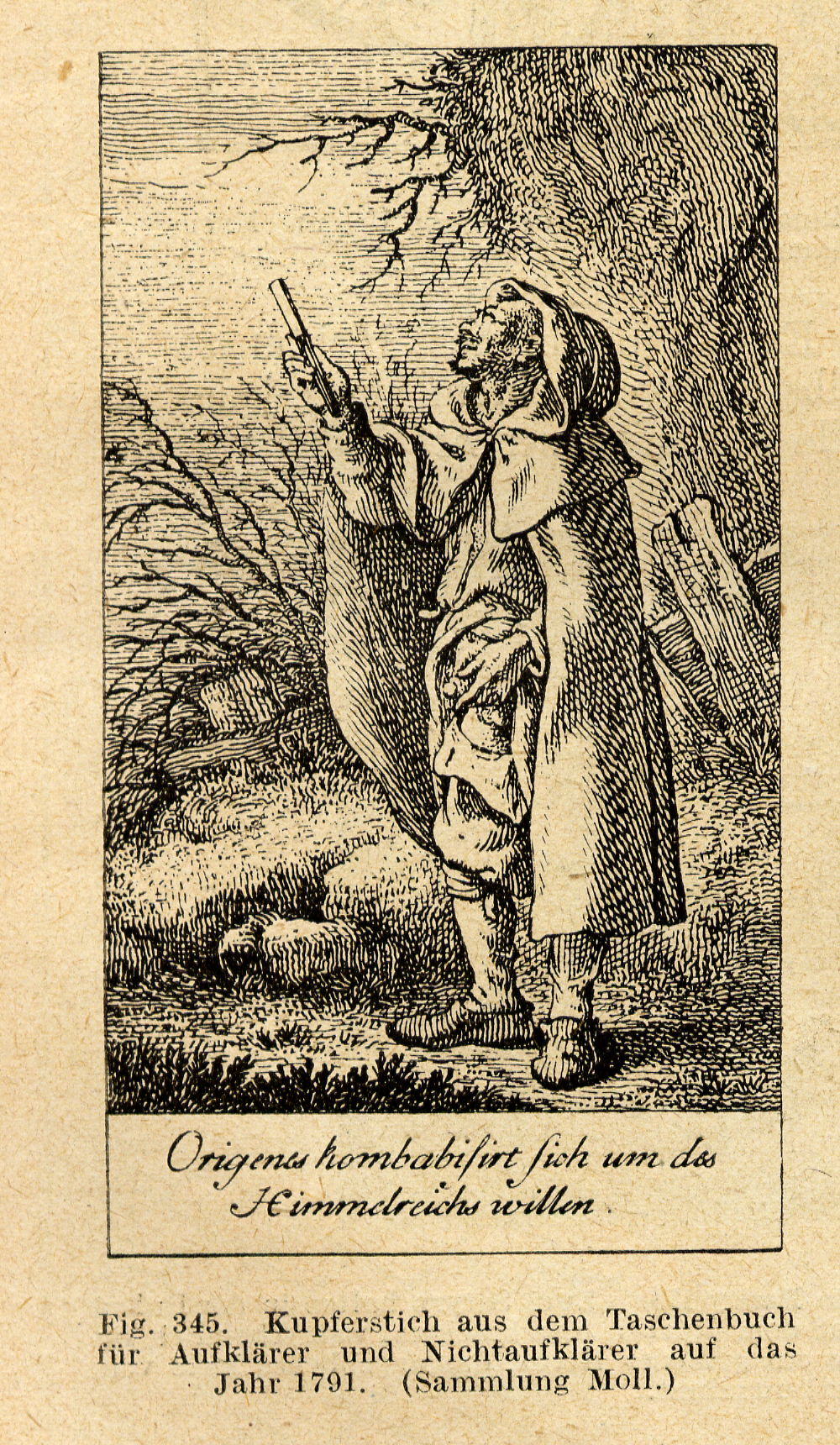
From the book Handbuch der Sexualwissenschaften: an 18th-century picture of Origen castrating himself

Moll wrote one of the earliest works on the normal practice of childhood sexuality when it comes to development of the child. Moll's analysis of infant sexuality emphasized the boundary between normal and abnormal sexual development. In his case studies, he found that healthy and "perverted" individuals varied little in their reports of childhood sexual conflicts. Numerous sexual drives and actions, including masturbation, attraction to those of the same sex or different ages, and other fetishistic inclinations, were not uncommon in childhood and did not necessarily indicate the development of perversion in adulthood. Moll's assertions leaned on his experience of participating in mutual masturbation at his all-boys boarding school. Moll described such activities as characteristic of sexual development between age 8–10 and the end of puberty at 20. He stated that the maturation of the sex organs would expose distinct sexual drives, mental associations, and habits.

While most adults will develop heterosexual drives and urges, a minority display homosexual or bisexual tendencies. Sexual deviancy can emerge in both heterosexual and homosexual individuals. Moll argued that psychological and environmental triggers preventing the natural transformation of infantile sexual urges are the determinants of perversion.

Moll divided the sexual response into four phases:

1. The onset
2. The equable voluptuous sensation
3. The voluptuous acme
4. The sudden diminution and cessation of the voluptuous sensation

In The Sexual Life of the Child, he encouraged parents to provide sex education to their children.

== Hypnotism ==
Moll was a leading researcher on subject of hypnotism.

Moll was a member of a group of doctors in West Berlin that treated different psychological illnesses using hypnotism, focusing on addiction and sexual ailments—including homosexuality, which was considered a perversion at the time.

Moll believed in the power of hypnotism, but only if it was used by a medical professional, as such he tried to convince professionals that it was an effective therapeutic method. He argued that it was useful in two ways, as a therapeutic tactic and a way to bring attention to the study of psychotherapy. He argued hypnotism could improve memory, helping a patient remember the cause of an obsessive behavior while also working to correct the behavior.

Moll published his account of the history of hypnotism and his own experiments in Hypnotism (1889), assisted by Auguste Forel and Max Dessoir.

== Psychic research ==
Moll was a strong critic of mysticism, occultism, and spiritualism. Although he studied parapsychical research, he was critical of it and offered naturalistic psychological explanations for paranormal phenomena. He frequently indulged in the unmasking of mediums and séances.

His book Christian Science, Medicine, and Occultism (1902) is an early text on anomalistic psychology. In the book, Moll criticized practices such as Christian Science, spiritualism, and occultism, claiming they were the result of fraud and hypnotic suggestion. He argued that suggestion explained the cures of Christian Science and the apparently supernatural rapport between magnetisers and their somnambulists. He wrote that fraud and hypnotism could explain mediums. According Heather Wolffram, "[Moll] argued that the hypnotic atmosphere of the darkened séance room and the suggestive effect of the experimenters' social and scientific prestige could be used to explain why seemingly rational people vouchsafed occult phenomena."

In 1903, Moll tested Clever Hans and was the first to suggest the horse was not psychically gifted but was reacting to unconscious signs.

Moll was involved in a legal dispute with the spiritualist medium Maria Vollhardt who he considered a fraud.

== Publications ==
- Hypnotism (1890)
- Les perversions l'instinct génital : Étude sur l'inversion sexuelle basée sur des documents officiels (1897)
- Untersuchungen über die libido sexualis (1898)
- Christian Science, Medicine, and Occultism (1902)
- Das Sexualleben des Kindes (1908)
