= Davit Gotsiridze =

Georgian footballer (born 2004)

Personal information
- Date of birth: 6 September 2004 (age 22)
- Place of birth: Georgia
- Position: Forward

Team information
- Current team: Kolkheti 1913
- Number: 8

Youth career
- Dinamo Tbilisi
- Saburtalo

Senior career*
Years	Team	Apps	(Gls)
2022–	Dinamo Tbilisi	13	(0)
2023–2024	→ Dinamo Tbilisi-2	44	(10)
2025	→ Gagra (loan)	34	(6)
2026	Dila	11	(0)
2026–	Kolkheti 1913	0	(0)

International career^{‡}
2020–2022	Georgia U18	9	(2)
2022–2023	Georgia U19	3	(1)
2024	Georgia U20	1	(0)
2024–	Georgia U21	11	(0)
- * Club domestic league appearances and goals as of 26 July 2026 ‡ National team caps and goals as of 8 December 2025

Davit Gotsiridze (Georgian: დავით გოცირიძე; born 6 September 2004) is a Georgian professional footballer who plays as a striker for Erovnuli Liga 2 club Kolkheti 1913.

He has won the Erovnuli Liga and Supercup and represented his country in the national youth teams.

== Club career ==
Gotsiridze passed through a selection process at Dinamo Tbilisi academy at the age of 7 in May 2012 and initially joined it as a goalkeeper. Later, he changed position to become a striker while being at Saburtalo.

Gotsiridze made a debut for the reserve team in the 2nd division in a 3–1 win over Locomotive on 5 March 2023 and opened his goal-scoring account twelve days later against WIT Georgia.

Overall, during the two seasons for Dinamo's reserves Gotsiridze scored ten times in 44 league appearances. In 2024, he joined the senior team and, apart from making 13 league appearances, helped them beat Dinamo Batumi in the Georgian Cup tournament with a winner.

In February 2025, Gotsiridze was loaned to Gagra on a season-long deal.

In January 2026, Gotsiridze joined the reigning cup holders Dila, although left the club in the summer to sign for 2nd division side Kolkheti 1913.

== International career ==
Gotsiridze has played for Georgia's four national youth teams. He was called up to the U18 team for two friendlies against Hungary in February 2022. Four months later, he netted in a 5–1 friendly win over Armenia in Rustavi.

Gotsiridze took part in all three ties of the 2023 UEFA European Under-19 Championship qualification campaign, scoring against Denmark.

As the U21 team started preparations for decisive matches in their 2025 UEFA European Under-21 Championship qualification round in October 2024, Gotsiridze made his debut against Sweden. After Georgia reached the final stage of the championship, Gotsiridze joined the team for friendly games against Finland and Serbia in March 2025.

On 22 January 2026, Gotsiridze moved to Dila, the runners-up of the previous league season.

== Career statistics ==
As of 22 June 2026

Appearances and goals by club, season and competition
Club	Season	League			National cup		European		Other		Total	
Club	Season	Division	Apps	Goals	Apps	Goals	Apps	Goals	Apps	Goals	Apps	Goals
Dinamo Tbilisi	2024	Erovnuli Liga	13	0	1	1	—		—		14	1
Dinamo Tbilisi-2	2023	Erovnuli Liga 2	31	6	—		—		—		31	6
Dinamo Tbilisi-2	2024	Erovnuli Liga 2	13	4	1	1	—		—		14	5
Dinamo Tbilisi-2	Total		44	10	1	1	0	0	0	0	45	11
Gagra (loan)	2025	Erovnuli Liga	34	6	—		—		—		34	6
Dila	2026	Erovnuli Liga	11	0	—		—		—		11	0
Career total			102	16	2	2	0	0	0	0	104	18

== Honours ==
Dinamo Tbilisi

- Erovnuli Liga: 2022
- Georgian Super Cup: 2023

== Personal life ==
Davit Gotsiridze is the son of ex-footballer Revaz Gotsiridze and grandson of Georgian football legend Ramaz Shengelia.
