= Susanne Dessoir =

German soprano

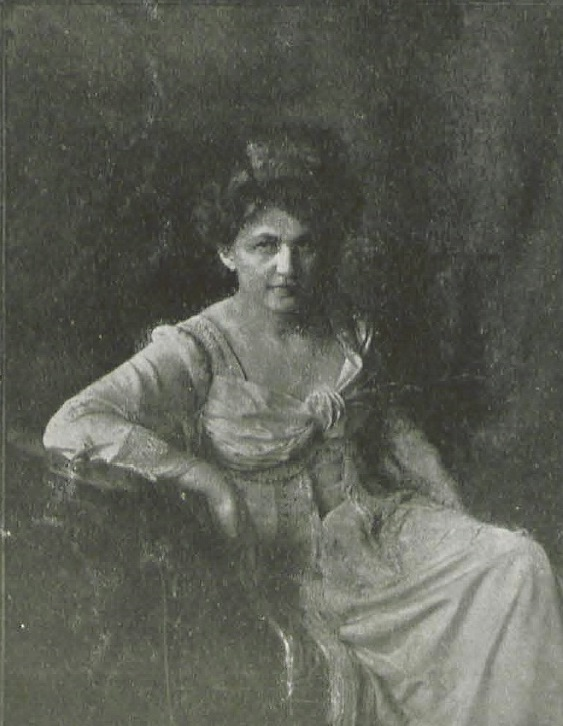
Susanne Dessoir, 1906. photo: Atelier Wertheim.

Susanne Dessoir, née Susanne Triepel (23 July 1869 – 24 June 1953) was a German operatic soprano.

== Life ==
Born in Zielona Góra, Silesia, Dessoir was a student of Amalie Joachim and Etelka Gerster. She performed mainly as a song and oratorio singer.

In 1899 she married the well-known psychologist and philosopher Max Dessoir. At least until 1912, she continued to perform as a concert singer. After her withdrawal from the stage she became involved with young artists, mainly composers (Max Reger for example).

In 1912, together with Bruno Hinze-Reinhold, she published the so-called Dessoir albums, collections of folk and children's songs as well as songs from the time before Schubert. These were reissued after the Second World War.

Dessoir died in Königstein im Taunus at the age of 83.
