= Bruno Hinze-Reinhold =

German Pianist and Music Scholar

Bruno Hinze-Reinhold (20 October 1877 – 26 December 1964) was a German pianist and music scholar. From 1916 to 1933, he was director of the music school and the Hochschule für Musik Franz Liszt, Weimar.

== Life ==
Hinze-Reinhold was born in Danzig in 1877 as the son of a doctor. From 1895, he received his piano training with Bruno Zwintscher, Robert Teichmüller and Alfred Reisenauer at the University of Music and Theatre Leipzig. In 1901, he moved to Berlin, where he taught at the Stern Conservatory and the Eichelberg Conservatory. He also became active as a chamber musician and piano accompanist. Together with the singer Susanne Dessoir, he published the Dessoir albums in 1912.

In 1913, he became head of a piano training class at the Grand Ducal Music School in Weimar. In 1916, he became interim head of the institution. In the same year, he received the title of professor and became director. Under his direction the music school was transformed into the Hochschule für Musik Franz Liszt, Weimar in 1930. In 1933, he was removed from office by the State government of the Thuringia under National Socialism. Thereupon, he moved back to Berlin and became a freelancer. Only in 1947 did he return to Weimar. Hinze-Reinhold was an important Liszt interpreter. He also included works by Schubert, Schumann and Chopin in his repertoire. In 1927, he formed, together with Max Strub (violinist) and Walter Schulz (cellist), the Weimar Trio.

Hinze-Reinhold died in Weimar at the age of 87. His estate is located in the Thüringisches Landesmusikarchiv in Weimar.

== Writings ==
- Lebenserinnerungen. (Edition Musik und Wort der Hochschule für Musik Franz Liszt Weimar. Vol. 1). Ed. by Michael Berg. Universitätsverlag, Weimar 1997, ISBN 3-86068-069-2.

== Literature ==
- Karl Heller: Hinze-Reinhold, Bruno. In Friedrich Blume (ed.): Die Musik in Geschichte und Gegenwart (MGG). First edition, volume 16 (Supplement 2: Eardsen - Zweibrücken). Bärenreiter/Metzler, Kassel et al. 1976, DNB 550439609
- Wolfram Huschke: Hinze-Reinhold, Bruno. In Gitta Günther, Wolfram Huschke, Walter Steiner (ed.): Weimar: Lexikon zu Stadtgeschichte. Metzler, Weimar 1998, ISBN 3-7400-0807-5, p. 204.
- Wolfram Huschke: Zukunft Musik: Eine Geschichte der Hochschule für Musik Franz Liszt Weimar. Böhlau, Cologne among others 2006, ISBN 3-412-30905-2, pp. 126ff., 200ff.
