= H. J. Burlingame =

American magician and magic historian

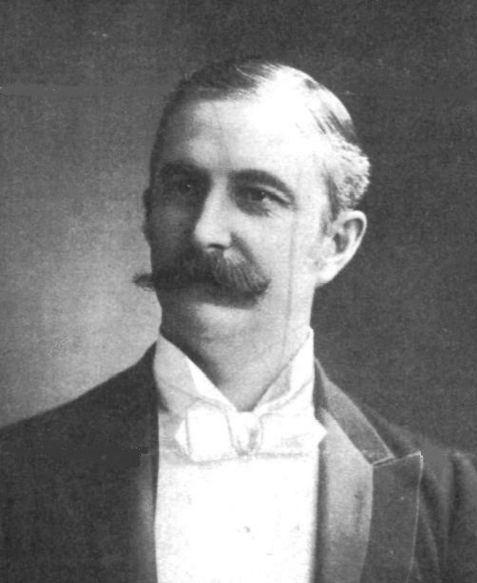
H. J. Burlingame in an 1898 publication

Hardin Jasper Burlingame (1852–1915) was an American magician and magic historian.

Burlingame had taken lessons from the magician David Tobias Bamberg. He later used the stage name "Jasper Bamberg" when he performed in Chicago.

Burlingame is most well known for his book Hermann the Magician (1897), a biography of the magician Alexander Herrmann.

He also wrote a biography of Baron Hartwig Seeman, a noted Swedish magician.

== Publications ==
- Tricks in Magic, Illusions, and Mental Phenomena (1895)
- Herrmann the Great: The Famous Magician's Wonderful Tricks (1897). Reprinted as Herrmann the Magician: His Life, His Secrets (1897)
- How To Read People's Minds (1905)
- Around the World With a Magician and a Juggler (1891)
- Leaves from Conjurers' Scrap books: Or, Modern Magicians and Their Works (1891)
- History of Magic and Magicians (1895)
- Magician's Handbook: Tricks and Secrets of the World's Greatest Magician, Herrmann the Great (1942)
