= Oliver Ross (footballer) =

Danish footballer (born 2004)

Personal information
- Date of birth: 10 October 2004 (age 22)
- Place of birth: Aalborg, Denmark
- Height: 1.86 m (6 ft 1 in)
- Positions: Forward; attacking midfielder

Team information
- Current team: Silkeborg
- Number: 11

Youth career
- Aalborg KFUM
- AaB

Senior career*
Years	Team	Apps	(Gls)
2022–2026	AaB	111	(12)
2026–	Silkeborg	27	(8)

International career
2020	Denmark U17	1	(0)
2021–2022	Denmark U18	9	(2)
2022–2023	Denmark U19	7	(4)
2023–2024	Denmark U20	7	(1)
2023	Denmark U21	1	(0)
- * Club domestic league appearances and goals as of 16:14, 15 November 2026 (UTC)

Oliver Ross (born 10 October 2004) is a Danish professional footballer who plays as a forward or an attacking midfielder for Danish Superliga club Silkeborg. He is the younger brother of Mathias Ross.

== Career ==
=== AaB ===
Oliver Ross, like his older brother Mathias Ross, came to AaB from partner club Aalborg KFUM. He worked his way up through the youth ranks and made his debut for the first team in a Danish Cup game against FIUK on 31 August 2021, scoring two goals in a 13–0 victory. Later in that season, on 20 March 2022, he got his Danish Superliga debut against Brøndby IF. Ross also played in 10 of the last 11 games of the season for AaB.

On 22 June 2022, Ross signed a new deal with AaB until June 2025 and was permanently promoted to the first team squad. In August 2022, it was rumoured that Italian giants AC Milan had put in a bid for Ross. But AaB's price tag probably meant that the deal never came off and Ross therefore stayed at AaB.

On 4 July 2024, AaB confirmed that they had extended their partnership with Ross until June 2027.

=== Silkeborg ===
On 2 February 2026, Danish Superliga club Silkeborg signed Ross on a contract running until 31 December 2029. On 12 April, he scored his debut goal in a 3–1 home league win against OB. On 11 October, he scored his first hat-trick for the club in a 3–3 home draw against AC Horsens in the Superliga.
