= Daniel Šmiga =

Czech footballer

Personal information
- Date of birth: 2 January 2004 (age 22)
- Place of birth: Czech Republic
- Position: Forward

Team information
- Current team: Zlín

Youth career
- 2011–2012: Finstal Lučina
- 2012–2017: Frýdek-Místek
- 2017–2021: Baník Ostrava

Senior career*
Years	Team	Apps	(Gls)
2021–2022	Baník Ostrava	4	(0)
2022–2026	Slavia Prague	3	(0)
2022–2026	Slavia Prague B	37	(15)
2023–2024	→ S&B Vlašim (loan)	18	(2)
2024–2025	→ Zlaté Moravce (loan)	20	(1)
2025–2026	→ Příbram (loan)	28	(6)
2026–	Zlín	0	(0)

International career^{‡}
2018–2019	Czech Republic U15	10	(9)
2019	Czech Republic U16	6	(1)
2020	Czech Republic U17	3	(1)
2021–	Czech Republic U18	11	(3)
- * Club domestic league appearances and goals as of 15 June 2025 ‡ National team caps and goals as of 18:00, 13 April 2021 (UTC)

Daniel Šmiga (born 2 January 2004) is a Czech professional footballer who plays as a forward for Czech side Zlín.

== Club career ==
Šmiga began his career at Finstal Lučina and Frýdek-Místek, before joining Baník Ostrava in 2017. On 1 May 2021, at the age of 17 years and 119 days, Šmiga made his debut for Baník Ostrava in a 1–1 draw against Zbrojovka Brno, becoming the youngest player in Baník Ostrava's history. On 22 February 2022, Šmiga signed for Slavia Prague. On 29 May 2026, Šmiga signed a contract with Zlín as a free agent.

== International career ==
Šmiga has represented the Czech Republic at under-15, under-16, under-17 and under-18 level.
