= Baron Hartwig Seeman =

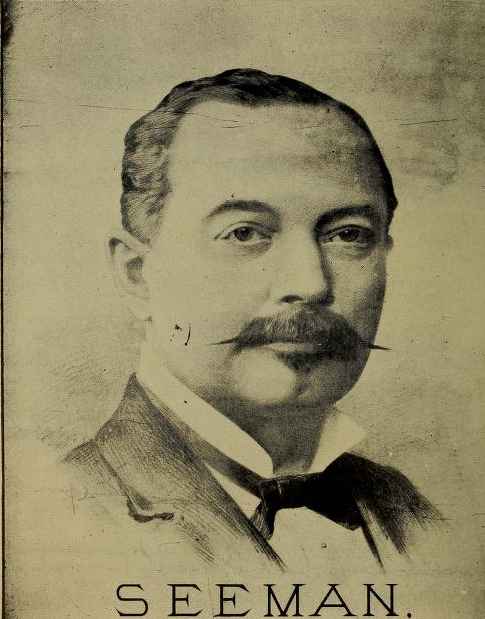
Baron Hartwig Seeman

Hartwig Seeman (3 June 1833 – 25 March 1886) was a Swedish magician. He died while on a tour of the southwestern United States in Kosse, Texas.

His father was a high-ranking officer in the Swedish army. His mother had died when he was ten years old. In his youth Seeman had developed an interest in magic trickery. Early in his career he worked as an artist and poet in Berlin, Germany. In 1860, he started performing professional magic. He had toured throughout Germany as a successful conjurer. He saved his money and travelled around Sweden and Norway, he became famous for performing an illusion known as "The Sphinx". He has been described by magic historians as the "foremost magician of Sweden".

On June 24, 1872, Seeman travelled to Benares in India to learn the tricks of fakirs. Whilst in India, Seeman observed a levitation trick that involved a young girl floating into the air.

In 1880, Seeman performed an "electra" illusion at the Academy of Music (New York City). It is considered to be an early suspension trick.

His son Adolph Seeman was also a magician.
