= Nikolaos Spyrakos =

Greek footballer

Personal information
- Date of birth: 23 February 2004 (age 22)
- Place of birth: Preveza, Greece
- Height: 1.79 m (5 ft 10 in)
- Position: Winger

Team information
- Current team: Kalamata (on loan from PAOK B)
- Number: 77

Youth career
- 2019–2022: PAOK

Senior career*
Years	Team	Apps	(Gls)
2022–	PAOK B	60	(5)
2025–	→ Kalamata (loan)	9	(0)

International career^{‡}
2021–2023	Greece U19	10	(3)
- * Club domestic league appearances and goals as of 18 January 2026 ‡ National team caps and goals as of 10 July 2023

Nikolaos Spyrakos (Greek: Νικόλαος Σπυράκος; born 23 February 2004) is a Greek professional footballer who plays as a winger for Super League 2 club Kalamata, on loan from PAOK B.
