= Badreddine Bushara =

Finnish footballer (born 2004)

Personal information
- Date of birth: 4 January 2004 (age 22)
- Place of birth: Finland
- Height: 1.73 m (5 ft 8 in)
- Position: Forward

Team information
- Current team: KPV
- Number: 21

Youth career
- Ilves

Senior career*
Years	Team	Apps	(Gls)
2020–2023	Ilves II	46	(13)
2022–2023	Ilves	17	(0)
2023	→ JäPS (loan)	3	(0)
2024	MP	0	(0)
2024–	KPV	22	(4)

International career^{‡}
2019	Finland U15	3	(1)
2019	Finland U16	4	(0)
2021–2022	Finland U18	5	(3)
2022–	Finland U19	6	(2)
- * Club domestic league appearances and goals as of 5 January 2025 ‡ National team caps and goals as of 28 December 2022

Badreddine Bushara (born 4 January 2004) is a Finnish professional footballer who plays as a forward for KPV.

== Club career ==
Bushara signed a new contract with Ilves in July 2022.

On 28 February 2024, Bushara signed with Ykkönen club Kokkolan Palloveikot (KPV).

== International career ==
Born in Finland, Bushara is of Sudanese descent. He has represented Finland from under-15 to under-19 level.

== Career statistics ==
As of 5 January 2025

Appearances and goals by club, season and competition
Club	Season	League			National cup (Note: Appearances in the Finnish Cup)		League cup		Other		Total	
Club	Season	Division	Apps	Goals	Apps	Goals	Apps	Goals	Apps	Goals	Apps	Goals
Ilves II	2020	Kakkonen	3	0	–		–		–		3	0
Ilves II	2021	Kakkonen	17	2	–		4 (Note: Appearances in the Kakkonen Cup)	2	–		21	4
Ilves II	2022	Kakkonen	19	10	–		–		–		19	10
Ilves II	2023	Kakkonen	7	1	–		–		–		7	1
Ilves II	Total		46	13	0	0	4	2	0	0	50	15
Ilves	2022	Veikkausliiga	11	0	2	0	4 (Note: Appearances in the Finnish League Cup)	0	–		17	0
Ilves	2023	Veikkausliiga	6	0	5	1	4	0	–		15	1
Ilves	Total		17	0	7	1	8	0	0	0	32	1
JäPS (loan)	2023	Ykkönen	3	0	0	0	–		–		3	0
MP	2024	Ykkösliiga	0	0	0	0	1	1	–		1	1
KPV	2024	Ykkönen	22	4	4	0	-		–		26	4
Career total			93	17	7	1	13	3	0	0	113	21

== Honours ==
Ilves

- Finnish Cup: 2023

KPV

- Ykkönen runner-up: 2024
