= Todor Pavlov (footballer) =

Bulgarian footballer (born 2004)

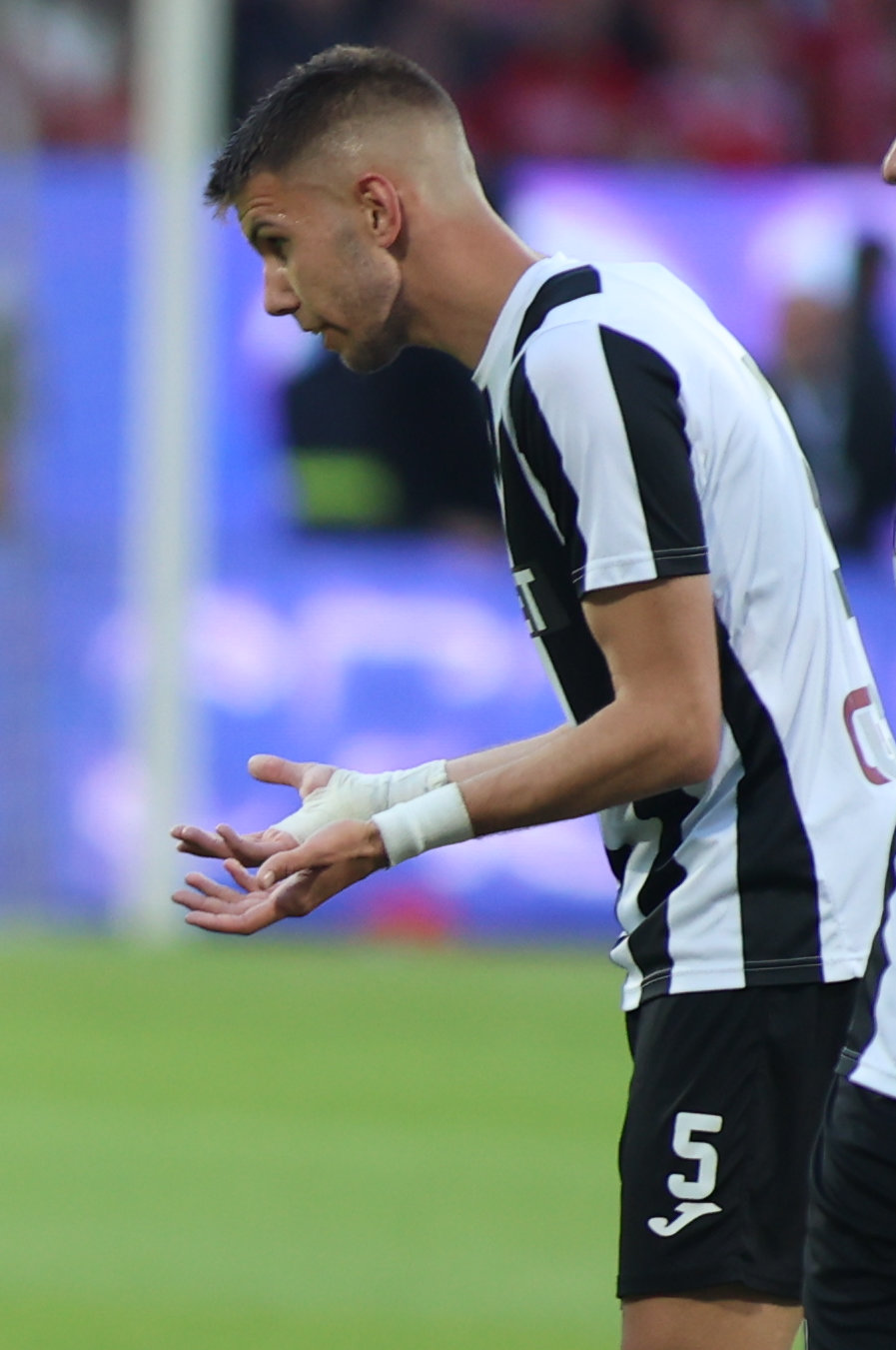

Personal information
- Full name: Todor Vasilev Pavlov
- Date of birth: 31 July 2004 (age 22)
- Place of birth: Plovdiv, Bulgaria
- Height: 1.90 m (6 ft 3 in)
- Position: Centre-back

Team information
- Current team: Lokomotiv Plovdiv
- Number: 5

Youth career
- –2012: Vekta Plovdiv
- 2012–2021: Lokomotiv Plovdiv

Senior career*
Years	Team	Apps	(Gls)
2021–2024	Lokomotiv Plovdiv II	51	(3)
2022–	Lokomotiv Plovdiv	75	(2)

International career^{‡}
2022	Bulgaria U19	5	(0)
2023–	Bulgaria U21	3	(0)
- * Club domestic league appearances and goals as of 31 May 2026 ‡ National team caps and goals as of 21:14, 1 September 2025 (UTC)

Todor Vasilev Pavlov (Bulgarian: Тодор Василев Павлов; born 31 July 2004) is a Bulgarian professional footballer who plays as a centre-back for First League club Lokomotiv Plovdiv.

== Career ==
Pavlov joined the Lokomotiv Plovdiv Youth Academy in 2012, and worked his way up through the junior levels. He made his senior debut with Lokomotiv on 9 July 2022, in a 2–1 First League win against Pirin Blagoevgrad.

On 2 February 2023, he signed his first professional contract with Lokomotiv, keeping him at the club until 2026. Pavlov scored his first goal on 21 April 2024, in a 1–1 league draw against CSKA 1948. On 29 March 2025, he signed a two-year contract extension, keeping him at Lokomotiv until 30 June 2027.

== Career statistics ==
=== Club ===
As of match played 31 May 2026

Appearances and goals by club, season and competition
Club	Season	League			National cup (Note: Includes Bulgarian Cup)		Continental		Other		Total	
Club	Season	Division	Apps	Goals	Apps	Goals	Apps	Goals	Apps	Goals	Apps	Goals
Lokomotiv Plovdiv II	2021–22	Third League	30	1	—		—		—		30	1
Lokomotiv Plovdiv II	2022–23	Third League	10	2	—		—		—		10	2
Lokomotiv Plovdiv II	2023–24	Third League	3	0	—		—		—		3	0
Lokomotiv Plovdiv II	2024–25	Third League	8	0	—		—		—		8	0
Lokomotiv Plovdiv II	Total		51	3	0	0	0	0	0	0	51	3
Lokomotiv Plovdiv	2022–23	First League	13	0	0	0	—		—		13	0
Lokomotiv Plovdiv	2023–24	First League	13	1	0	0	—		—		13	1
Lokomotiv Plovdiv	2024–25	First League	21	0	2	0	—		1 (Note: Appearance in Relegation play-off)	0	24	0
Lokomotiv Plovdiv	2025–26	First League	28	1	6	0	—		1 (Note: Appearance in Conference League play-off)	0	35	1
Lokomotiv Plovdiv	Total		75	2	8	0	0	0	2	0	85	2
Career total			126	5	8	0	0	0	2	0	136	5
