= Ayberk Karapo =

Turkish footballer (born 2004)

Personal information
- Date of birth: 21 July 2004 (age 22)
- Place of birth: Manisa, Turkey
- Height: 1.86 m (6 ft 1 in)
- Position: Centre-back

Team information
- Current team: Kasımpaşa
- Number: 45

Youth career
- 2014–2018: Altınordu
- 2018–2022: Manisa

Senior career*
Years	Team	Apps	(Gls)
2022–2026	Manisa	80	(5)
2024–2025	→ Çaykur Rizespor (loan)	7	(0)
2026–	Kasımpaşa	8	(0)

International career^{‡}
2022–2023	Turkey U20	8	(2)
2023–	Turkey U21	21	(0)
- * Club domestic league appearances and goals as of 18 October 2026 ‡ National team caps and goals as of 6 October 2026

Ayberk Karapo (born 21 July 2004) is a Turkish professional footballer who plays as a centre-back for Süper Lig club Kasımpaşa.

== Club career ==
Karapo is a product of the youth academies of Altınordu and Manisa. On 9 August 2022, he signed his first professional contract with Manisa for 5 years and debuted in the TFF 1. League. On 13 September 2024, he was loaned to the Süper Lig club Çaykur Rizespor for the 2024–25 season.

== International career ==
Karapo was called up to the Turkey U21s for a set of friendlies on 10 June 2023.
