= Federico Crescenti =

Swiss footballer (born 2004)

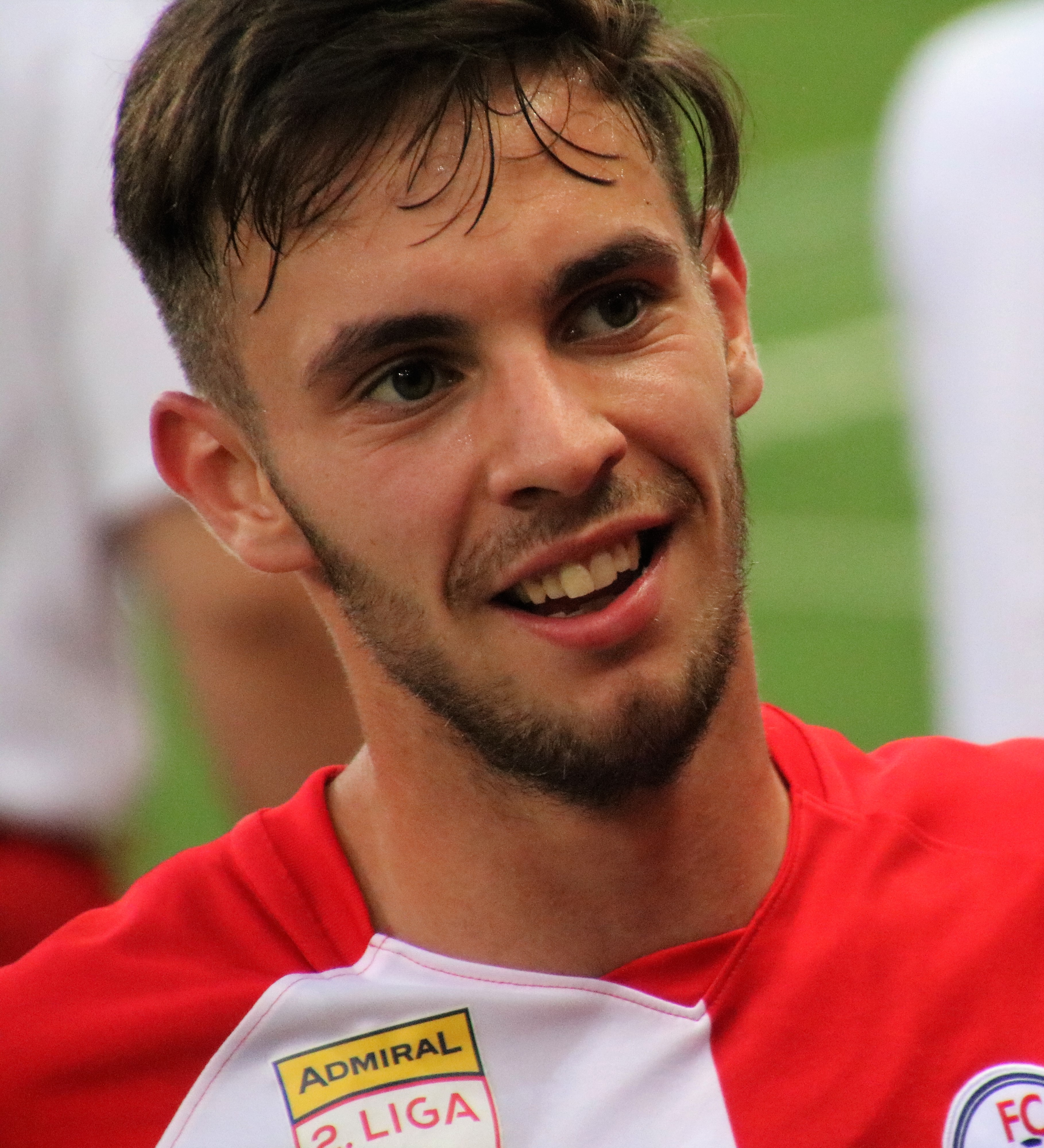
- Crescenti with FC Liefering in 2021

Personal information
- Full name: Federico Leandro Crescenti
- Date of birth: 13 July 2004 (age 22)
- Place of birth: Dornbirn, Austria
- Height: 1.73 m (5 ft 8 in)
- Position: Forward

Youth career
- FC Rheineck
- –2020: FC St. Gallen
- 2020–2021: Red Bull Salzburg

Senior career*
Years	Team	Apps	(Gls)
2021–2024	FC Liefering	20	(2)
2024–2025	Red Bull Salzburg	0	(0)
2024	→ Schwarz-Weiß Bregenz (loan)	11	(3)
2024–2025	→ Vaduz (loan)	6	(0)
2025	→ FC Rapperswil-Jona (loan)	3	(0)

International career^{‡}
2019	Switzerland U15	2	(0)
2019	Switzerland U17	5	(0)
2021	Switzerland U18	3	(0)
2021–2022	Switzerland U19	6	(1)
- * Club domestic league appearances and goals as of 15 March 2025 ‡ National team caps and goals as of 27 September 2022

Federico Leandro Crescenti (born 13 July 2004) is a professional footballer who plays as a forward. Born in Austria, he represents Switzerland internationally.

== Club career ==
On 1 February 2024, Crescenti was loaned to 2. Liga club Schwarz-Weiß Bregenz.

In June 2024, Crescenti joined Swiss Challenge League club Vaduz in Liechtenstein, on a one-year loan deal. On 16 January 2025, the loan to Vaduz was terminated early and Cresenti was sent on a new loan to FC Rapperswil-Jona in Swiss Promotion League.

== International career ==
Crescenti was born in Austria, raised in Switzerland, and is of Italian descent. He holds dual Swiss-Italian citizenship. He is a youth international for Switzerland, having played up to the Switzerland U19s.

== Career statistics ==
As of match played 15 March 2025

Appearances and goals by club, season and competition
Club	Season	League			National cup (Note: Includes Liechtenstein Cup)		Continental		Other		Total	
Club	Season	Division	Apps	Goals	Apps	Goals	Apps	Goals	Apps	Goals	Apps	Goals
FC Liefering	2021–22	2. Liga	6	0	0	0	—		0	0	6	0
FC Liefering	2022–23	2. Liga	11	2	0	0	—		0	0	11	2
FC Liefering	2023–24	2. Liga	3	0	0	0	—		0	0	3	0
FC Liefering	Total		20	2	0	0	—		0	0	20	2
Schwarz-Weiß Bregenz (loan)	2023–24	2. Liga	11	3	—		—		0	0	11	3
Vaduz (loan)	2024–25	Swiss Challenge League	6	0	2	1	—		0	0	8	1
FC Rapperswil-Jona (loan)	2024–25	Swiss Promotion League	3	0	—		—		0	0	3	0
Career total			40	5	2	1	0	0	0	0	42	6
