= Rączna =

- Village
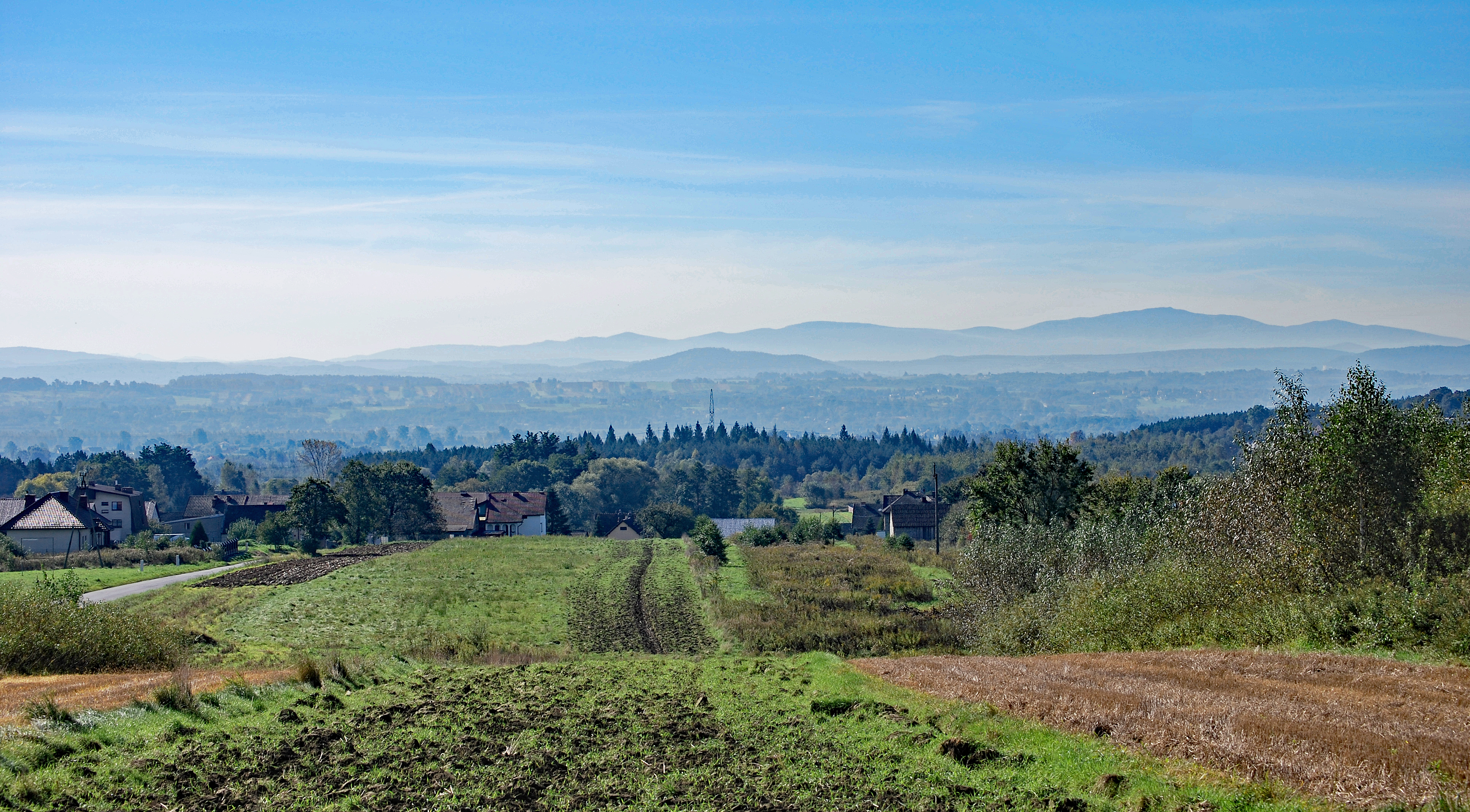

- Location within Poland
- Coordinates: 50°0′38″N 19°45′41″E
- Country: Poland
- Voivodeship: Lesser Poland
- County: Kraków
- Gmina: Liszki
- Population: 2,051

Rączna [ˈrɔnt͡ʂna] is a village in the administrative district of Gmina Liszki, within Kraków County, Lesser Poland Voivodeship, in southern Poland.
